= 1934 Wimbledon Championships – Mixed doubles =

Mixed doubles
- 1934 Wimbledon Championships

Final
- Champions: (Japan) Ryuki Miki (United Kingdom) Dorothy Round
- Runners-up: (United Kingdom) Bunny Austin (United Kingdom) Dorothy Shepherd-Barron
- Score: 3–6, 6–4, 6–0

Details
- Draw: 80 (5Q)
- Seeds: 4

Events
Singles	men	women		boys	girls
Doubles	men	women	mixed	boys	girls
- Wimbledon Championships

Gottfried von Cramm and Hilde Sperling were the defending champions, but lost in the third round to Ian Collins and Gwyn Corbett, Lady Rowallan.

Ryuki Miki and Dorothy Round defeated Bunny Austin and Dorothy Shepherd-Barron in the final, 3–6, 6–4, 6–0 to win the mixed doubles tennis title at the 1934 Wimbledon Championships.

== Seeds ==
1. (Germany) Gottfried von Cramm / (Denmark) Hilde Sperling (third round)
2. (United States) George Lott / (United States) Sarah Palfrey (quarterfinals)
3. (Spain) Enrique Maier / (United States) Elizabeth Ryan (second round)
4. (France) Jean Borotra / (United Kingdom) Betty Nuthall (first round)

Click on the seed number of a player to go to their draw section.

== Draw ==
Key

- Q = Qualifier
- WC = Wild card
- LL = Lucky loser
- Alt = Alternate
- ITF = ITF entry
- PR = Protected ranking
- SR = Special ranking
- SE = Special exempt
- JE = Junior exempt
- JR = Junior Accelerator Programme entrant
- CO = College Accelerator Programme entrant
- NG = Next Gen Accelerator Program entrant
- w/o = Walkover
- r = Retired
- d = Defaulted

=== Finals ===
Quarterfinals
(United Kingdom) Harry Lee (United Kingdom) Freda James	4	8	6
(France) Jacques Brugnon (United Kingdom) Doris Howard	6	6	4
(Japan) Iwao Aoki (United Kingdom) Mary Hardwick	2	2
(Japan) Ryuki Miki (United Kingdom) Dorothy Round	6	6
2	(United States) George Lott (United States) Sarah Palfrey	2	4
(United Kingdom) Bunny Austin (United Kingdom) Dorothy Shepherd-Barron	6	6
(United Kingdom) Charles Kingsley (United Kingdom) Kitty Godfree	2	4
(United Kingdom) John Olliff (United Kingdom) Joan Ingram	6	6

Semifinals
(United Kingdom) Harry Lee (United Kingdom) Freda James	3	2
(Japan) Ryuki Miki (United Kingdom) Dorothy Round	6	6
(United Kingdom) Bunny Austin (United Kingdom) Dorothy Shepherd-Barron	6	6
(United Kingdom) John Olliff (United Kingdom) Joan Ingram	4	1

Final
(Japan) Ryuki Miki (United Kingdom) Dorothy Round	3	6	6
(United Kingdom) Bunny Austin (United Kingdom) Dorothy Shepherd-Barron	6	4	0

=== Top half ===
==== Section 1 ====
First round
1	(Germany) Gottfried von Cramm (Denmark) Hilde Sperling	6	6
Q	(United Kingdom) Richard Turnbull (United Kingdom) Helen Turnbull	3	3
(France) Marcel Bernard (France) Ida Adamoff	6	6	6
(Germany) Henner Henkel (United Kingdom) Phyllis Satterthwaite	8	3	1

Second round
1	(Germany) G von Cramm (Denmark) H Sperling	6	6
(Japan) Hideo Nishimura (United Kingdom) Gethyn Harry	3	3
(United Kingdom) Ian Collins (United Kingdom) Lady Rowallan	6	8	8
(Hungary) Emil Gábori (United Kingdom) Phyllis Covell	2	10	6
(France) M Bernard (France) I Adamoff	3	1
(United Kingdom) Harry Lee (United Kingdom) Freda James	6	6
(United Kingdom) Pat Sherwood (United Kingdom) Margaret Mellows	6	6
(United Kingdom) Ted Avory (United Kingdom) Monica Ricketts	2	3

Third round
1	(Germany) G von Cramm (Denmark) H Sperling	7	7
(United Kingdom) I Collins (United Kingdom) Lady Rowallan	9	9
(United Kingdom) H Lee (United Kingdom) W James	6	7	6
(United Kingdom) P Sherwood (United Kingdom) M Mellows	3	9	3

Fourth round
(United Kingdom) I Collins (United Kingdom) Lady Rowallan	2	4
(United Kingdom) H Lee (United Kingdom) W James	6	6

==== Section 2 ====
First round
(France) Jacques Brugnon (United Kingdom) Doris Howard	6	6
(Australia) Joseph Clynton-Reed (United Kingdom) Alex McOstrich	3	1
(Australia) Harry Hopman (Netherlands) Madzy Couquerque	6	6
(United Kingdom) GA Pratt (United Kingdom) J Strettell	2	3

Second round
(France) J Brugnon (United Kingdom) D Howard	6	6
(Republic of Ireland) Henry Purcell (Republic of Ireland) Josephine Harman	3	3
(United Kingdom) Charles Hare (United Kingdom) Joan Strawson
(Switzerland) Hector Fisher (Switzerland) Lolette Payot	w/o
(Australia) H Hopman (Netherlands) M Couquerque	6	8	5
(France) André Martin-Legeay (France) Sylvie Henrotin	8	6	7
(Germany) Hans Denker (Germany) Marie Horn	w/o
(United Kingdom) Gwyn Tuckett (United Kingdom) Freda Scott

Third round
(France) J Brugnon (United Kingdom) D Howard	11	6
(United Kingdom) C Hare (United Kingdom) J Strawson	9	4
(France) A Martin-Legeay (France) S Henrotin
(United Kingdom) G Tuckett (United Kingdom) F Scott	w/o

Fourth round
(France) J Brugnon (United Kingdom) D Howard
(France) A Martin-Legeay (France) S Henrotin	w/o

==== Section 3 ====
First round
3	(Spain) Enrique Maier (United States) Elizabeth Ryan	6	11
(Denmark) Anker Jacobsen (Hungary) Magda Baumgarten	1	9
(United Kingdom) Eric Peters (United Kingdom) Effie Peters	7	6
Q	(United Kingdom) RC Wackett (United Kingdom) Penny Weekes	5	0

Second round
3	(Spain) E Maier (United States) E Ryan	w/o
(United States) Lester Stoefen (United States) Carolin Babcock
Q	GE Bean (United Kingdom) CJ Tyrrell	6	4	6
Q	(United Kingdom) Basil Lawrence (United Kingdom) Mrs BR Lawrence	2	6	3
(United Kingdom) E Peters (United Kingdom) E Peters	4	6
(Japan) Iwao Aoki (United Kingdom) Mary Hardwick	6	8
(Soviet Union) Sergei Rodzianko (United Kingdom) Gladys Clarke-Jervoise	w/o
(Netherlands) Josef Knottenbelt (United Kingdom) Davinia Townsend

Third round
(United States) L Stoefen (United States) C Babcock	6	6
GE Bean (United Kingdom) CJ Tyrrell	2	3
(Japan) I Aoki (United Kingdom) M Hardwick
(Netherlands) J Knottenbelt (United Kingdom) D Townsend	w/o

Fourth round
(United States) L Stoefen (United States) C Babcock	6	5
(Japan) I Aoki (United Kingdom) M Hardwick	8	7

The nationality of GE Bean is unknown.

==== Section 4 ====
First round
(Czechoslovakia) Friedrich von Rohrer; Mrs F von Rohrer	1	1
(Japan) Ryuki Miki (United Kingdom) Dorothy Round	6	6
(Australia) Adrian Quist (France) Colette Rosambert	6	6
(United Kingdom) Norman Latchford (United Kingdom) Sybil Edwards	4	2

Second round
(Japan) T Miki (United Kingdom) D Round	6	6
(United Kingdom) Douglas Freshwater (Australia) Esna Robertson	1	3
(Egypt) Pierre Grandguillot (United States) Dorothy Andrus
(Switzerland) Charles Aeschlimann (United Kingdom) Joan Ridley	w/o
(Australia) A Quist (France) C Rosambert	w/o
(Belgium) Léopold de Borman (Belgium) Nelly Adamson
(Australia) Vivian McGrath (Australia) Joan Hartigan	8	6
(United Kingdom) Nigel Sharpe (United Kingdom) J McAlpine	6	1

Third round
(Japan) T Miki (United Kingdom) D Round	6	6
(Egypt) P Grandguillot (United States) D Andrus	3	4
(Belgium) L de Borman (Belgium) N Adamson	3	3
(Australia) V McGrath (Australia) J Hartigan	6	6

Fourth round
(Japan) T Miki (United Kingdom) D Round	7	7
(Australia) V McGrath (Australia) J Hartigan	5	5

The nationality of Mrs F von Rohrer is unknown.

=== Bottom half ===
==== Section 5 ====
First round
2	(United States) George Lott (United States) Sarah Palfrey
(Australia) Jack Crawford (Australia) Marjorie Crawford	w/o
(United States) David Jones (United Kingdom) Helen Dyson	5	6	6
(South Africa) Vernon Kirby (United Kingdom) Mary Heeley	7	4	4

Second round
2	(United States) G Lott (United States) S Palfrey	5	6	6
(Japan) Jiro Fujikura (United Kingdom) Patricia Brazier	7	3	4
(Japan) Jiro Yamagishi (United Kingdom) Ermyntrude Harvey
(United Kingdom) Ian Bailey (United Kingdom) Eileen Fearnley-Whittingstall	w/o
(United States) D Jones (United Kingdom) H Dyson	6	6
(Austria) Hermann Artens (Spain) Bella Pons	1	4
(United Kingdom) Bob Tinkler (United Kingdom) Nancy Lyle	5	6
(United Kingdom) Frank Wilde (United Kingdom) Phyllis King	7	8

Third round
2	(United States) G Lott (United States) S Palfrey	6	8
(Japan) J Yamagishi (United Kingdom) E Harvey	4	6
(United States) D Jones (United Kingdom) H Dyson	0	1
(United Kingdom) F Wilde (United Kingdom) P King	6	6

Fourth round
2	(United States) G Lott (United States) S Palfrey	6	6
(United Kingdom) F Wilde (United Kingdom) P King	4	3

==== Section 6 ====
First round
(Poland) Ignacy Tłoczyński (Poland) Jadwiga Jędrzejowska	7	4	4
(United Kingdom) Raymond Tuckey (United Kingdom) Peggy Scriven	5	6	6
(United Kingdom) Bunny Austin (United Kingdom) Dorothy Shepherd-Barron	6	6
(France) Pierre Henri Landry (France) Jacqueline Gallay	4	2

Second round
(United Kingdom) R Tuckey (United Kingdom) M Scriven	6	0	6
(New Zealand) Cam Malfroy (United Kingdom) Kay Stammers	4	6	3
(Austria) Georg von Metaxa (Austria) Gabriele Szapáry	6	7
(India) Mohammed Sleem (United Kingdom) Audrey Wright	3	5
(United Kingdom) H Austin (United Kingdom) D Shepherd-Barron	8	6
(United Kingdom) Laddie Wheatcroft (United Kingdom) Christabel Wheatcroft	6	2
(Czechoslovakia) Ladislav Hecht (Italy) Lucia Valerio	2	2
(United Kingdom) Guy Cooper (United Kingdom) Evelyn Dearman	6	6

Third round
(United Kingdom) R Tuckey (United Kingdom) M Scriven	6	6
(Austria) G von Metaxa (Austria) G Szapáry	3	4
(United Kingdom) H Austin (United Kingdom) D Shepherd-Barron	6	6
(United Kingdom) G Cooper (United Kingdom) E Dearman	3	3

Fourth round
(United Kingdom) R Tuckey (United Kingdom) M Scriven	2	7
(United Kingdom) H Austin (United Kingdom) D Shepherd-Barron	6	9

==== Section 7 ====
First round
4	(France) Jean Borotra (United Kingdom) Betty Nuthall	4	4
(Czechoslovakia) Roderich Menzel (United Kingdom) MA Thomas	6	6
(Monaco) Vladimir Landau (United Kingdom) Jeanette Morfey	6	0	2
(United Kingdom) George Godsell (United Kingdom) Madge Slaney	1	6	6

Second round
(Czechoslovakia) R Menzel (United Kingdom) MA Thomas	6	6
(United Kingdom) Brian Gilbert (United Kingdom) Mary Whitmarsh	4	2
(New Zealand) Alan Stedman (Australia) Nell Hopman	6	9
(United Kingdom) Kenneth Gandar-Dower (United Kingdom) Susan Noel	4	7
(United Kingdom) G Godsell (United Kingdom) M Slaney	2	2
(United Kingdom) Charles Kingsley (United Kingdom) Kitty Godfree	6	6
(India) Donald Rutnam (United Kingdom) Joy Mowbray-Green	7	6
(Germany) Werner Menzel (France) Elizabeth Macready	5	4

Third round
(Czechoslovakia) R Menzel (United Kingdom) MA Thomas	6	6	6
(New Zealand) A Stedman (Australia) E Hopman	2	8	2
(United Kingdom) C Kingsley (United Kingdom) K Godfree	6	3	7
(India) D Rutnam (United Kingdom) J Mowbray-Green	4	6	5

Fourth round
(Czechoslovakia) R Menzel (United Kingdom) MA Thomas	5	4
(United Kingdom) C Kingsley (United Kingdom) K Godfree	7	6

==== Section 8 ====
First round
(Hungary) Béla von Kehrling (United States) Virginia Rice	6	6
(France) Antoine Gentien (France) Jacqueline Goldschmidt	4	2
(United Kingdom) Billy Collins (United Kingdom) Elsa Haylock	2	4
(United Kingdom) John Olliff (United Kingdom) Joan Ingram	6	6

Second round
(Hungary) B von Kehrling (United States) V Rice	3	2
(France) Jean Lesueur (France) Simonne Mathieu	6	6
(United Kingdom) Jack Lysaght (United Kingdom) Billie Yorke
(United Kingdom) Pat Hughes (United States) Josephine Cruickshank	w/o
(United Kingdom) J Olliff (United Kingdom) J Ingram	6	6	6
(Australia) Don Turnbull (Germany) Cilly Aussem	8	3	3
(Belgium) Pierre Geelhand de Merxem (Belgium) Miriamme de Borman	4	4
(United Kingdom) Bobby Meredith (United Kingdom) Ruth Kirk	6	6

Third round
(France) J Lesueur (France) S Mathieu	5	6	6
(United Kingdom) J Lysaght (United Kingdom) A Yorke	7	1	4
(United Kingdom) J Olliff (United Kingdom) J Ingram	6	4	6
(United Kingdom) G Meredith (United Kingdom) R Kirk	4	6	3

Fourth round
(France) J Lesueur (France) S Mathieu	w/o
(United Kingdom) J Olliff (United Kingdom) J Ingram
