= 1935 French Championships – Women's singles =

Women's singles
- 1935 French Championships

Final
- Champion: (Germany) Hilde Sperling
- Runner-up: (France) Simonne Mathieu
- Score: 6–2, 6–1

Details
- Seeds: 8

Events
| Singles | men | women |
| Doubles | men | women |
| ← 1934 · | French Championships | · 1936 → |

Hilde Sperling defeated Simonne Mathieu 6–2, 6–1 in the final to win the women's singles tennis title at the 1935 French Championships.

== Seeds ==
The seeded players are listed below. Hilde Sperling is the champion; others show the round in which they were eliminated.

1. (United Kingdom) Margaret Scriven (semifinals)
2. (United States) Helen Jacobs (semifinals)
3. (Germany) Hilde Sperling (champion)
4. (France) Simonne Mathieu (finalist)
5. (Switzerland) Lolette Payot (quarterfinals)
6. (United Kingdom) Kay Stammers (first round)
7. (France) Sylvie Henrotin (quarterfinals)
8. (Netherlands) Madzy Rollin Couquerque (quarterfinals)

== Draw ==
=== Key ===
- Q = Qualifier
- WC = Wild card
- LL = Lucky loser
- r = Retired

=== Finals ===
Quarterfinals
1 | (United Kingdom) Margaret Scriven | 6 | 6
8 | (Netherlands) Madzy Rollin Couquerque | 0 | 3
4 | (France) Simonne Mathieu | 7 | 6
5 | (Switzerland) Lolette Payot | 5 | 4
(France) Simone Iribarne | 2 | 2
3 | (Germany) Hilde Sperling | 6 | 6
7 | (France) Sylvie Henrotin | 4 | 2
2 | (United States) Helen Jacobs | 6 | 6

Semifinals
1 | (United Kingdom) Margaret Scriven | 6 | 1
4 | (France) Simonne Mathieu | 8 | 6
3 | (Germany) Hilde Sperling | 7 | 6
2 | (United States) Helen Jacobs | 5 | 3

Finals
4 | (France) Simonne Mathieu | 2 | 1
3 | (Germany) Hilde Sperling | 6 | 6

=== Earlier rounds ===
==== Section 1 ====
First round

Second round
1 | (United Kingdom) Scriven | 6 | 6
(France) Pillette | 3 | 2
(France) Adamoff
(France) Row
8 | (Netherlands) Couquerque | 6 | 6
(United Kingdom) Norman | 2 | 1
(Italy) Valerio | 6 | 6
(France) Goronitchenko | 4 | 3

Third round
1 | (United Kingdom) Scriven | 6 | 6
(France) Adamoff | 4 | 1
8 | (Netherlands) Couquerque | 6 | 6 | 6
(Italy) Valerio | 8 | 4 | 2

Quarterfinals
1 | (United Kingdom) Scriven | 6 | 6
8 | (Netherlands) Couquerque | 0 | 3

==== Section 2 ====
First round
(Italy) Tonolli | 6 | 9
(France) Gallay | 4 | 7
(France) Kleinadel | 10 | 2
(France) Adamson | 12 | 6
5 | (Switzerland) Payot | 6 | 6
(France) Horner | 3 | 3
(France) Belliard | 6 | 7
(United Kingdom) Whitmarsh | 4 | 5
(Germany) Horn | 3 | 7 | 6
(France) Neufeld | 6 | 5 | 0
(France) Peyre | 6 | 6
(United Kingdom) Hardwick | 3 | 4

Second round
4 | (France) Mathieu | 6 | 6
Luzzatti | 1 | 0
(Italy) Tonolli | 3 | 6 | 1
(France) Adamson | 6 | 3 | 6
5 | (Switzerland) Payot | 6 | 7
(France) Belliard | 2 | 5
(Germany) Horn | 4 | 4
(France) Peyre | 6 | 6

Third round
4 | (France) Mathieu | 8 | 6
(France) Adamson | 6 | 0
5 | (Switzerland) Payot | 5 | 6 | 6
(France) Peyre | 7 | 1 | 3

Quarterfinals
4 | (France) Mathieu | 7 | 6
5 | (Switzerland) Payot | 5 | 4

==== Section 3 ====
First round
(United States) Andrus
(France) Charpenel
(Chile) Lizana | 6 | 6
(France) Rosambert | 3 | 2
(France) Iribarne | 7 | 6
(Czech Republic) Cepkova | 5 | 1
(France) Pannetier | 6 | 6
6 | (United Kingdom) Stammers | 3 | 4
(United Kingdom) Thomas | 7 | 6
Saoutchik | 5 | 0
(France) Goldschmidt | 6 | 6
(Spain) De Alvarez | 1 | 2
(Australia) Hopman | 6 | 6
(France) Olivieri | 1 | 1

Second round
(United States) Andrus | 5 | 1
(Chile) Lizana | 7 | 6
(France) Iribarne | 5 | 6 | 6
(France) Pannetier | 7 | 2 | 2
(United Kingdom) Thomas | 3 | 2
(France) Goldschmidt | 6 | 6
(Australia) Hopman | 0 | 3
3 | (Germany) Sperling | 6 | 6

Third round
(Chile) Lizana | 3 | 2
(France) Iribarne | 6 | 6
(France) Goldschmidt | 1 | 3
3 | (Germany) Sperling | 6 | 6

Quarterfinals
(France) Iribarne | 2 | 2
3 | (Germany) Sperling | 6 | 6

==== Section 4 ====
First round

Second round
(France) Varin | 4 | 0
(United Kingdom) Yorke | 6 | 6
(Greece) Xydis | 6 | 1 | 4
7 | (France) Henrotin | 3 | 6 | 6
(France) Wyns-Speranza | 6 | 0 | 0
(France) Orlandini | 4 | 6 | 6
(France) Barbier | 2 | 2
2 | (United States) Jacobs | 6 | 6

Third round
(United Kingdom) Yorke | 1 | 6 | 5
7 | (France) Henrotin | 6 | 3 | 7
(France) Orlandini | 2 | 0
2 | (United States) Jacobs | 6 | 6

Quarterfinals
7 | (France) Henrotin | 4 | 2
2 | (United States) Jacobs | 6 | 6

| Preceded by 1935 Australian Championships – Women's singles | Grand Slam women's singles | Succeeded by 1935 Wimbledon Championships – Women's singles |
