= 1937 Wimbledon Championships – Mixed doubles =

Mixed doubles
- 1937 Wimbledon Championships

Final
- Champions: (United States) Don Budge (United States) Alice Marble
- Runners-up: (France) Yvon Petra (France) Simonne Mathieu
- Score: 6–4, 6–1

Details
- Draw: 80 (5Q)
- Seeds: 4

Events
Singles	men	women		boys	girls
Doubles	men	women	mixed	boys	girls
- Wimbledon Championships

Fred Perry and Dorothy Round were the defending champions, but Perry was ineligible to compete after turning professional at the end of the 1936 season. Round partnered with Don Butler but lost in the third round to Don Budge and Alice Marble.

Budge and Marble defeated Yvon Petra and Simonne Mathieu in the final, 6–4, 6–1 to win the mixed doubles tennis title at the 1937 Wimbledon Championships.

== Seeds ==
1. (United States) Don Budge / (United States) Alice Marble (champions)
2. (France) Yvon Petra / (France) Simonne Mathieu (final)
3. (United Kingdom) Frank Wilde / (United Kingdom) Mary Whitmarsh (fourth round)
4. (South Africa) Norman Farquharson / (United Kingdom) Kay Stammers (third round)

Click on the seed number of a player to go to their draw section.

== Draw ==
Key

- Q = Qualifier
- WC = Wild card
- LL = Lucky loser
- Alt = Alternate
- ITF = ITF entry
- PR = Protected ranking
- SR = Special ranking
- SE = Special exempt
- JE = Junior exempt
- JR = Junior Accelerator Programme entrant
- CO = College Accelerator Programme entrant
- NG = Next Gen Accelerator Program entrant
- w/o = Walkover
- r = Retired
- d = Defaulted

=== Finals ===
Quarterfinals
1	(United States) Don Budge (United States) Alice Marble	6	6
(United Kingdom) Raymond Tuckey (United Kingdom) Peggy Scriven	2	2
(United Kingdom) Bob Tinkler (United Kingdom) Margot Lumb	1	2
(United States) Gene Mako (Poland) Jadwiga Jędrzejowska	6	6
(Germany) Daniel Prenn (United Kingdom) Evelyn Dearman	6	9
(Japan) Jiro Yamagishi (United Kingdom) Betty Nuthall	2	7
(France) Jean Borotra (France) Colette Boegner	1	6
2	(France) Yvon Petra (France) Simonne Mathieu	6	8

Semifinals
1	(United States) Don Budge (United States) Alice Marble	6	6
(United States) Gene Mako (Poland) Jadwiga Jędrzejowska	3	2
(Germany) Daniel Prenn (United Kingdom) Evelyn Dearman	2	4
2	(France) Yvon Petra (France) Simonne Mathieu	6	6

Final
1	(United States) Don Budge (United States) Alice Marble	6	6
2	(France) Yvon Petra (France) Simonne Mathieu	4	1

=== Top half ===
==== Section 1 ====
First round

Second round
1	(United States) Don Budge (United States) Alice Marble	6	2	6
(United Kingdom) GI Bayley (United Kingdom) Audrey Wright	2	6	2
(United Kingdom) Don Butler (United Kingdom) Dorothy Round	6	6
(Republic of China (1912–1949)) Ho Jin (United Kingdom) Sheila Paterson	4	0
(United Kingdom) Jack Harrison (United Kingdom) Mary Burrows	2	3
(France) Jacques Brugnon (United States) Dorothy Andrus	6	6
(United Kingdom) Donald MacPhail (United Kingdom) Dorothy Shepherd-Barron	6	6
(Republic of Ireland) Henry Purcell (United Kingdom) Mona Riddell	4	3

Third round
1	(United States) D Budge (United States) A Marble	6	4	6
(United Kingdom) D Butler (United Kingdom) D Round	2	6	1
(France) J Brugnon (United States) D Andrus	6	6
(United Kingdom) D MacPhail (United Kingdom) D Shepherd-Barron	3	2

Fourth round
1	(United States) D Budge (United States) A Marble	6	6
(France) J Brugnon (United States) D Andrus	1	1

==== Section 2 ====
First round

Second round
(United Kingdom) Raymond Tuckey (United Kingdom) Peggy Scriven	6	6
(United Kingdom) John Olliff (United Kingdom) Freda James	1	3
(United Kingdom) Eric Attewell (United Kingdom) Rosemary Smith	2	5
(United Kingdom) Henry Billington (United Kingdom) Joan Ingram	6	7
(United States) Leslie Hall (United Kingdom) Joan Marquis	6	4	8
(United Kingdom) Ian Collins (United Kingdom) Lady Rowallan	3	6	10
(United Kingdom) Colin Ritchie (United Kingdom) Penny Weekes	6	2	3
(Netherlands) Hans van Swol (Netherlands) Truid Terwindt	2	6	6

Third round
(United Kingdom) R Tuckey (United Kingdom) M Scriven	6	6
(United Kingdom) H Billington (United Kingdom) J Ingram	4	3
(United Kingdom) I Collins (United Kingdom) Lady Rowallan	6	5	6
(Netherlands) A van Swol (Netherlands) G Terwindt	4	7	2

Fourth round
(United Kingdom) R Tuckey (United Kingdom) M Scriven	6	6
(United Kingdom) I Collins (United Kingdom) Lady Rowallan	1	3

==== Section 3 ====
First round

Second round
4	(South Africa) Norman Farquharson (United Kingdom) Kay Stammers	6	6
(Republic of Ireland) George McVeagh (United Kingdom) Patience Thomson	3	3
(France) Marcel Bernard (France) Sylvie Henrotin	6	6
(South Africa) Colin Eedes (United Kingdom) Vere King	3	1
(Belgium) André Lacroix (France) Lilí de la Valdène	w/o
(United Kingdom) Ralph Nichols (United Kingdom) Betty Uber
(United Kingdom) George Godsell (United Kingdom) Gertrude Valentine-Brown	1	10
(United Kingdom) Bob Tinkler (United Kingdom) Margot Lumb	6	12

Third round
4	(South Africa) N Farquharson (United Kingdom) K Stammers	4	6	2
(France) M Bernard (France) S Henrotin	6	2	6
(United Kingdom) R Nichols (United Kingdom) E Uber	2	3
(United Kingdom) R Tinkler (United Kingdom) M Lumb	6	6

Fourth round
(France) M Bernard (France) S Henrotin	3	2
(United Kingdom) R Tinkler (United Kingdom) M Lumb	6	6

==== Section 4 ====
First round
(Kingdom of Yugoslavia) Josip Palada (United Kingdom) Gaby Curtis	4	9	6
GE Bean (United Kingdom) Mrs W Merricks	6	7	4
(Netherlands) Tod Hughan (Hungary) Magda Baumgarten	1	5
(Switzerland) Max Ellmer (United Kingdom) Peggy Pleydell Bouverie	6	7
(United Kingdom) Jack Lysaght (United Kingdom) Billie Yorke	6	6	7
(Sweden) Karl Schröder (United Kingdom) Jean Saunders	4	8	9
(Austria) Georg von Metaxa (Germany) Marie Horn	8	4
(South Africa) Eustace Fannin (United Kingdom) Phyllis King	10	6
(United Kingdom) Charles Hare (United Kingdom) Mary Hardwick	6	9
(Belgium) Jack Van den Eynde (United Kingdom) Madie Pearson	4	7
(South Africa) Vernon Kirby (United Kingdom) Mary Heeley	6	6
(Switzerland) Charles Aeschlimann (United Kingdom) Patsy O'Connell	1	2
(United Kingdom) Herman David (United Kingdom) Elsie Pittman	9	10
Q	(United Kingdom) John Wright (United Kingdom) Peggy Knight	7	8
(United States) Gene Mako (Poland) Jadwiga Jędrzejowska	6	6
(Switzerland) Hector Fisher (France) Elizabeth Macready	1	2

Second round
(Kingdom of Yugoslavia) J Palada (United Kingdom) G Curtis	6	6
(Switzerland) M Ellmer (United Kingdom) M Pleydell Bouverie	3	1
(Sweden) K Schröder (United Kingdom) J Saunders	6	6
(South Africa) E Fannin (United Kingdom) P King	0	2
(United Kingdom) C Hare (United Kingdom) M Hardwick	6	2	6
(South Africa) V Kirby (United Kingdom) M Heeley	4	6	1
(United Kingdom) H David (United Kingdom) E Pittman	5	4
(United States) G Mako (Poland) J Jędrzejowska	7	6

Third round
(Kingdom of Yugoslavia) J Palada (United Kingdom) G Curtis	1	6	4
(Sweden) K Schröder (United Kingdom) J Saunders	6	2	6
(United Kingdom) C Hare (United Kingdom) M Hardwick	6	4	3
(United States) G Mako (Poland) J Jędrzejowska	4	6	6

Fourth round
(Sweden) K Schröder (United Kingdom) J Saunders	6	6	1
(United States) G Mako (Poland) J Jędrzejowska	4	8	6

The nationality of GE Bean is unknown.

=== Bottom half ===
==== Section 5 ====
First round
(United Kingdom) Eric Filby (United Kingdom) Freda Underwood	6	6	6
(Norway) Fritz Jenssen (United Kingdom) Mrs CP Brutton	8	3	2
(United Kingdom) Harry Lee (United Kingdom) Nancy Dickin	3	6	6
(New Zealand) Dennis Coombe (United Kingdom) Nancy Lyle	6	4	4
(United Kingdom) Brian Sturgeon (United Kingdom) Pamela Morison	3	4
(United Kingdom) John Collins (United Kingdom) Gladys Southam	6	6
(United Kingdom) Maurice Lucking (United Kingdom) Gladys Osborne	6	3	2
(Kingdom of Yugoslavia) Franjo Kukuljević (Netherlands) Madzy Couquerque	3	6	6
(United Kingdom) Billy Collins (United Kingdom) Olga MacInnes	6	7
(United States) Wayne Sabin (United States) Katherine Winthrop	4	5
(Germany) Daniel Prenn (United Kingdom) Evelyn Dearman	6	6
(Denmark) Helge Plougmann (Denmark) Else Hollis	1	2
Q	(United Kingdom) Cecil Betts (United Kingdom) Yvonne Allnatt	6	6
(United Kingdom) Laddie Wheatcroft (United Kingdom) Christabel Wheatcroft	2	2
(United Kingdom) Bobby Meredith (United Kingdom) Ruth Kirk	7	6
(United Kingdom) Edmund David (United Kingdom) Betty Hobson	5	2

Second round
(United Kingdom) E Filby (United Kingdom) F Underwood	7	2	3
(United Kingdom) H Lee (United Kingdom) N Dickin	5	6	6
(United Kingdom) J Collins (United Kingdom) G Southam	2	6	2
(Kingdom of Yugoslavia) F Kukuljević (Netherlands) M Couquerque	6	4	6
(United Kingdom) W Collins (United Kingdom) O MacInnes	7	4
(Germany) D Prenn (United Kingdom) E Dearman	9	6
Q	(United Kingdom) C Betts (United Kingdom) Y Allnatt	2	1
(United Kingdom) G Meredith (United Kingdom) R Kirk	6	6

Third round
(United Kingdom) H Lee (United Kingdom) N Dickin	7	3	6
(Kingdom of Yugoslavia) F Kukuljević (Netherlands) M Couquerque	5	6	3
(Germany) D Prenn (United Kingdom) E Dearman	6	8
(United Kingdom) G Meredith (United Kingdom) R Kirk	2	6

Fourth round
(United Kingdom) H Lee (United Kingdom) N Dickin	4	6	3
(Germany) D Prenn (United Kingdom) E Dearman	6	4	6

==== Section 6 ====
First round

Second round
(United Kingdom) Bob Riseley (Austria) Rosl Kraus	2	2
(Japan) Jiro Yamagishi (United Kingdom) Betty Nuthall	6	6
(South Africa) Eustace Fannin (Republic of Ireland) Josephine Harman	6	14
(United Kingdom) Jimmy Reddall (United Kingdom) Helen Burr	0	12
(United Kingdom) Ted Avory (United Kingdom) Joan Strawson	6	1	1
(United Kingdom) Ronnie Shayes (United Kingdom) Ermyntrude Harvey	1	6	6
(Kingdom of Yugoslavia) Franjo Punčec (Republic of Ireland) Joy Myerscough	6	3	2
3	(United Kingdom) Frank Wilde (United Kingdom) Mary Whitmarsh	1	6	6

Third round
(Japan) J Yamagishi (United Kingdom) B Nuthall	6	7
(South Africa) E Fannin (Republic of Ireland) J Harman	3	5
(United Kingdom) R Shayes (United Kingdom) E Harvey	3	6	3
3	(United Kingdom) F Wilde (United Kingdom) M Whitmarsh	6	3	6

Fourth round
(Japan) J Yamagishi (United Kingdom) B Nuthall	6	6
3	(United Kingdom) F Wilde (United Kingdom) M Whitmarsh	3	4

==== Section 7 ====
First round

Second round
(United Kingdom) Murray Deloford (United Kingdom) Nina Brown	7	6
(Greece) Georgios Nikolaides (Greece) Phyllis Xydis	5	2
(France) Jean Borotra (France) Colette Boegner	6	10
(United Kingdom) Guy Cooper (United Kingdom) Sheila Chuter	2	8
(United Kingdom) Pat Sherwood (United Kingdom) Elsa Haylock	3	6	6
(United Kingdom) John Comery (United Kingdom) Rita Jarvis	6	4	4
Q	(Australia) Leonard King (United Kingdom) Mary Norman	3	6
(Belgium) Léopold de Borman (United Kingdom) Madge Slaney	6	8

Third round
(United Kingdom) M Deloford (United Kingdom) N Brown	6	2	2
(France) J Borotra (France) C Boegner	3	6	6
(United Kingdom) P Sherwood (United Kingdom) E Haylock	10	7	6
(Belgium) L de Borman (United Kingdom) M Slaney	8	9	2

Fourth round
(France) J Borotra (France) C Boegner	6	6
(United Kingdom) P Sherwood (United Kingdom) E Haylock	3	4

==== Section 8 ====
First round

Second round
Q	(United Kingdom) Wilfred Freeman (United Kingdom) Mildred Freeman	6	7
(Switzerland) Boris Maneff (United Kingdom) Margaret Mellows	3	5
(United Kingdom) Dickie Ritchie (United Kingdom) Valerie Scott	6	7
(United Kingdom) Jimmy Hunt (United Kingdom) Yvonne Law	3	5
(United Kingdom) Eric Peters (United Kingdom) Effie Peters	6	6
Q	(United Kingdom) Gerry France; M Parr	1	3
(United Kingdom) Bill Manby (United Kingdom) Cecily Marriott	3	4
2	(France) Yvon Petra (France) Simonne Mathieu	6	6

Third round
Q	(United Kingdom) W Freeman (United Kingdom) M Freeman	6	5	3
(United Kingdom) R Ritchie (United Kingdom) V Scott	2	7	6
(United Kingdom) E Peters (United Kingdom) E Peters	3	10
2	(France) Y Petra (France) S Mathieu	6	12

Fourth round
(United Kingdom) R Ritchie (United Kingdom) V Scott	0	3
2	(France) Y Petra (France) S Mathieu	6	6

The nationality of Miss M Parr is unknown.
