= 1933 Wimbledon Championships – Women's singles =

Women's singles
- 1933 Wimbledon Championships

Final
- Champion: (United States) Helen Moody
- Runner-up: (United Kingdom) Dorothy Round
- Score: 6–4, 6–8, 6–3

Details
- Draw: 96 (10Q)
- Seeds: 8

Events
Singles	men	women		boys	girls
Doubles	men	women	mixed	boys	girls
- Wimbledon Championships

Helen Moody successfully defended her title, defeating Dorothy Round in the final, 6–4, 6–8, 6–3 to win the ladies' singles tennis title at the 1933 Wimbledon Championships.

== Seeds ==
1. (United States) Helen Moody (champion)
2. (United Kingdom) Dorothy Round (final)
3. (United Kingdom) Peggy Scriven (quarterfinals)
4. (France) Simonne Mathieu (quarterfinals)
5. (United States) Helen Jacobs (semifinals)
6. (Germany) Hilde Krahwinkel (semifinals)
7. (Poland) Jadwiga Jędrzejowska (third round)
8. (Switzerland) Lolette Payot (quarterfinals)

Click on the seed number of a player to go to their draw section.

== Draw ==
Key

- Q = Qualifier
- WC = Wild card
- LL = Lucky loser
- Alt = Alternate
- ITF = ITF entry
- PR = Protected ranking
- SR = Special ranking
- SE = Special exempt
- JE = Junior exempt
- JR = Junior Accelerator Programme entrant
- CO = College Accelerator Programme entrant
- NG = Next Gen Accelerator Program entrant
- w/o = Walkover
- r = Retired
- d = Defaulted

=== Finals ===
Quarterfinals
2	(United Kingdom) Dorothy Round	6	6
(Italy) Lucia Valerio	3	2
4	(France) Simonne Mathieu	1	6	2
5	(United States) Helen Jacobs	6	1	6
6	(Germany) Hilde Krahwinkel	6	3	6
3	(United Kingdom) Peggy Scriven	4	6	1
8	(Switzerland) Lolette Payot	4	1
1	(United States) Helen Moody	6	6

Semifinals
2	(United Kingdom) Dorothy Round	4	6	6
5	(United States) Helen Jacobs	6	4	2
6	(Germany) Hilde Krahwinkel	4	3
1	(United States) Helen Moody	6	6

Final
2	(United Kingdom) Dorothy Round	4	8	3
1	(United States) Helen Moody	6	6	6

=== Top half ===
==== Section 1 ====
First round

Second round
2	(United Kingdom) Dorothy Round	6	6
(United Kingdom) Jeanette Morley	2	3
(United Kingdom) Billie Yorke	8	4
(Greece) Helene Nicolopoulos	10	6
Q	(United Kingdom) Madie Moss	6	10
(Republic of Ireland) Josephine Harman	2	8
(United Kingdom) Sybil Edwards	7	2	6
(United Kingdom) Mary Whitmarsh	5	6	2

Third round
2	(United Kingdom) D Round	6	6
(Greece) H Nicolopoulos	4	3
Q	(United Kingdom) M Moss	1	4
(United Kingdom) S Edwards	6	6

Fourth round
2	(United Kingdom) DE Round	6	6
(United Kingdom) S Edwards	4	2

==== Section 2 ====
First round

Second round
7	(Poland) Jadwiga Jędrzejowska	3	6	6
(United Kingdom) Mrs G Maclean	6	0	2
(Germany) Marie Horn	2	7	10
(France) Jacqueline Goldschmidt	6	5	8
(United Kingdom) Florence Ford	6	6
(United Kingdom) Alex McOstrich	3	1
(Italy) Lucia Valerio	6	6
(United Kingdom) Elsa Haylock	2	2

Third round
7	(Poland) J Jędrzejowska	3	3
(Germany) M Horn	6	6
(United Kingdom) F Ford	2	6	1
(Italy) L Valerio	6	3	6

Fourth round
(Germany) M Horn	3	6
(Italy) L Valerio	6	8

==== Section 3 ====
First round
4	(France) Simonne Mathieu	6	6
(United Kingdom) Joan Ingram	1	2
Q	(United Kingdom) Barbara Drew	3	1
(United Kingdom) Mary Hardwick	6	6
(United Kingdom) Ermyntrude Harvey	6	6
(Belgium) Nelly Adamson	4	0
(United Kingdom) Beatrice Feltham	9	7
(United Kingdom) Yvonne Law	7	5
Q	(United Kingdom) Dora Beazley	1	6
(United Kingdom) Gethyn Harry	6	8
(Spain) Bella Pons	1	6	8
(United Kingdom) Dorothy Anderson	6	2	6
(United Kingdom) Phyllis Covell	1	2
(United Kingdom) Kay Stammers	6	6
(United Kingdom) Joan Strawson	6	6
(United Kingdom) Joy Mowbray-Green	4	2

Second round
4	(France) S Mathieu	6	4	6
(United Kingdom) M Hardwick	3	6	3
(United Kingdom) E Harvey	2	1
(United Kingdom) B Feltham	6	6
(United Kingdom) G Harry	4	6	6
(Spain) B Pons	6	4	2
(United Kingdom) K Stammers	6	6
(United Kingdom) J Strawson	3	3

Third round
4	(France) S Mathieu	4	8	6
(United Kingdom) B Feltham	6	6	2
(United Kingdom) G Harry	1	6
(United Kingdom) K Stammers	6	8

Fourth round
4	(France) S Mathieu	6	6
(United Kingdom) K Stammers	4	0

==== Section 4 ====
First round
5	(United States) Helen Jacobs	6	6
Q	(United Kingdom) Sheila Chuter	2	1
(United Kingdom) Margaret Mellows	4	7	2
(United Kingdom) Jean Saunders	6	5	6
(United Kingdom) Mary Knapp	7	5	2
(United Kingdom) Naomi Trentham	5	7	6
(United Kingdom) Christabel Wheatcroft	2	1
(Netherlands) Madzy Couquerque	6	6
(United Kingdom) Phyllis Whitley	10	7
(United Kingdom) Nora Martin	8	5
(United Kingdom) Peggy Michell	6	6
(United Kingdom) Gladys Southwell	3	4
(United Kingdom) Andree Lucas	3	6	2
Q	(United Kingdom) Dorothy Crichton	6	2	6
(United Kingdom) Violet Owen	7	6	1
(United States) Dorothy Burke	9	4	6

Second round
5	(United States) H Jacobs	6	6
(United Kingdom) J Saunders	1	3
(United Kingdom) N Trentham	6	1	9
(Netherlands) M Couquerque	3	6	7
(United Kingdom) P Whitley	3	3
(United Kingdom) M Michell	6	6
Q	(United Kingdom) D Crichton	4	4
(United States) D Burke	6	6

Third round
5	(United States) H Jacobs	6	6
(United Kingdom) N Trentham	2	1
(United Kingdom) M Michell	6	3	2
(United States) D Burke	3	6	6

Fourth round
5	(United States) H Jacobs	6	6
(United States) D Burke	0	4

=== Bottom half ===
==== Section 5 ====
First round
(United Kingdom) Phyllis King	6	6
(United Kingdom) Effie Peters	2	1
(United Kingdom) Freda Scott	4	3^{r}
(United Kingdom) Olga Webb	6	3
(France) Ida Adamoff	w/o
(United Kingdom) Ruth Kirk
(United Kingdom) Elsie Pittman	7	5	6
(United Kingdom) Susan Noel	5	7	2
(United Kingdom) Dorothy Shepherd-Barron	6	10
(United Kingdom) NC Case	1	8
(United Kingdom) Vera Montgomery	1	8	4
(United Kingdom) Freda James	6	6	6
(United Kingdom) JL Seymour	6	6
Q	(United Kingdom) Daphne White	2	3
Q	(United Kingdom) KE Robertson	2	1
6	(Germany) Hilde Krahwinkel	6	6

Second round
(United Kingdom) P King	6	6
(United Kingdom) O Webb	1	1
(United Kingdom) R Kirk	6	6
(United Kingdom) E Pittman	1	4
(United Kingdom) D Shepherd-Barron	5	3
(United Kingdom) W James	7	6
(United Kingdom) JL Seymour	3	3
6	(Germany) H Krahwinkel	6	6

Third round
(United Kingdom) P King	6	6
(United Kingdom) R Kirk	0	1
(United Kingdom) W James	3	4
6	(Germany) H Krahwinkel	6	6

Fourth round
(United Kingdom) P King	2	5
6	(Germany) H Krahwinkel	6	7

==== Section 6 ====
First round
Q	(United Kingdom) Betty Soames	6	2	1
Q	(United Kingdom) Mie Johnstone	1	6	6
(United Kingdom) Joan Ridley	6	6
Q	(United Kingdom) Audrey Wright	0	1
(United Kingdom) Betty Nuthall	6	6
(United Kingdom) Madge Slaney	2	2
(United Kingdom) MA Thomas	6	6
(Australia) Margaret Wilson	0	3
(United Kingdom) Nancy Lyle	6	6
(United Kingdom) Marjorie Stork	0	2
(United Kingdom) Joy Cunningham	8	0	4
(United Kingdom) Evelyn Goldsworth	6	6	6
(United Kingdom) Kitty Godfree	5	6	6
(France) Colette Rosambert	7	2	4
(Belgium) Josane Sigart	5	5
3	(United Kingdom) Peggy Scriven	7	7

Second round
Q	(United Kingdom) M Johnstone	1	4
(United Kingdom) J Ridley	6	6
(United Kingdom) B Nuthall	6	6
(United Kingdom) MA Thomas	4	2
(United Kingdom) N Lyle	6	6
(United Kingdom) E Goldsworth	1	2
(United Kingdom) K Godfree	2	6	3
3	(United Kingdom) M Scriven	6	1	6

Third round
(United Kingdom) J Ridley	1	3
(United Kingdom) B Nuthall	6	6
(United Kingdom) N Lyle	6	1	7
3	(United Kingdom) M Scriven	4	6	9

Fourth round
(United Kingdom) B Nuthall	6	0	4
3	(United Kingdom) M Scriven	3	6	6

==== Section 7 ====
First round

Second round
(United Kingdom) Evelyn Dearman	3	6	6
(United Kingdom) Helen Dyson	6	2	0
(United Kingdom) Eileen Fearnley-Whittingstall	6	6
(United Kingdom) Mildred Nonweiler	0	2
(United Kingdom) Edie Rudd	5	6
(United Kingdom) Winnie Mason	7	8
(United Kingdom) Winifred Bower	0	3
8	(Switzerland) Lolette Payot	6	6

Third round
(United Kingdom) E Dearman	3	6	2
(United Kingdom) E Fearnley-Whittingstall	6	4	6
(United Kingdom) W Mason	5	5
8	(Switzerland) L Payot	7	7

Fourth round
(United Kingdom) E Fearnley-Whittingstall	6	7	5
8	(Switzerland) L Payot	8	5	7

==== Section 8 ====
First round

Second round
(United States) Virginia Rice	4	4
(Germany) Marga von Ende-Pflügner	6	6
(United Kingdom) Phyllis Satterthwaite	3	0
(France) Sylvie Henrotin	6	6
(United Kingdom) Mary Heeley	6	6
(United Kingdom) Patricia Brazier	1	1
(France) Elizabeth Macready	0	0
1	(United States) Helen Moody	6	6

Third round
(Germany) M von Ende-Pflügner	5	1
(France) S Henrotin	7	6
(United Kingdom) M Heeley	2	1
1	(United States) H Moody	6	6

Fourth round
(France) S Henrotin	3	0
1	(United States) H Moody	6	6

Preceded by 1933 French Championships	Grand Slams; Women's Singles	Succeeded by 1933 U.S. National Championships
