= 1933 French Championships – Women's singles =

Women's singles
- 1933 French Championships

Final
- Champion: (United Kingdom) Margaret Scriven
- Runner-up: (France) Simonne Mathieu
- Score: 6–2, 4–6, 6–4

Details
- Seeds: 8

Events
| Singles | men | women |
| Doubles | men | women |
| ← 1932 · | French Championships | · 1934 → |

Margaret Scriven defeated Simonne Mathieu in the final, 6–2, 4–6, 6–4 to win the women's singles tennis title at the 1933 French Championships. It was the only time an unseeded player won the title until Jeļena Ostapenko did so in 2017.

== Seeds ==
The seeded players are listed below. Margaret Scriven is the champion; others show the round in which they were eliminated.

1. (Switzerland) Lolette Payot (third round)
2. (United States) Helen Jacobs (semifinals)
3. (France) Simonne Mathieu (finalist)
4. (Germany) Hilde Krahwinkel (second round)
5. (United Kingdom) Mary Heeley (quarterfinals)
6. (United Kingdom) Eileen Fearnley Whittingstall (quarterfinals)
7. (Belgium) Josane Sigart (second round)
8. (France) Ida Adamoff (second round)

== Draw ==
=== Key ===
- Q = Qualifier
- WC = Wild card
- LL = Lucky loser
- r = Retired

=== Finals ===
Quarterfinals
(United Kingdom) Betty Nuthall | 6 | 6
(United States) Dorothy Burke | 3 | 1
(United Kingdom) Margaret Scriven | 6 | 6
5 | (United Kingdom) Mary Heeley | 2 | 4
6 | (United Kingdom) Eileen Fearnley Whittingstall | 2 | 0
3 | (France) Simonne Mathieu | 6 | 6
(France) Jacqueline Goldschmidt | 6 | 1 | 3
2 | (United States) Helen Jacobs | 1 | 6 | 6

Semifinals
(United Kingdom) Betty Nuthall | 2 | 6 | 3
(United Kingdom) Margaret Scriven | 6 | 4 | 6
3 | (France) Simonne Mathieu | 8 | 6
2 | (United States) Helen Jacobs | 6 | 3

Finals
(United Kingdom) Margaret Scriven | 6 | 4 | 6
3 | (France) Simonne Mathieu | 2 | 6 | 4

=== Earlier rounds ===
==== Section 1 ====
First round

Second round
1 | (Switzerland) Payot | 6 | 6
(United Kingdom) Satterthwaite | 2 | 4
(United Kingdom) Nuthall | 6 | 6
(France) Belliard | 3 | 0
8 | (France) Adamoff | 3 | 6 | 3
(United States) Burke | 6 | 0 | 6
(United Kingdom) Wilson | 6 | 6
(France) Macready | 4 | 2

Third round
1 | (Switzerland) Payot | 2 | 2
(United Kingdom) Nuthall | 6 | 6
(United States) Burke | 6 | 1 | 7
(United Kingdom) Wilson | 3 | 6 | 5

Quarterfinals
(United Kingdom) Nuthall | 6 | 6
(United States) Burke | 3 | 1

==== Section 2 ====
First round
4 | (Germany) Krahwinkel | 7 | 6
(Poland) Jędrzejowska | 5 | 2
(United Kingdom) Scriven | 6 | 6
(Hungary) Baumgarten | 0 | 3
(France) Henrotin | 7 | 6 | 6
(Netherlands) Couquerque | 9 | 2 | 4
(France) Golding
(France) Neufeld
5 | (United Kingdom) Heeley | 6 | 6
(France) Pillette | 0 | 3
(Italy) Valerio | 6 | 6
(France) Aubert | 3 | 4
(United States) Ryan
Wolfrom
(France) Goronitchenko
(Australia) Crawford

Second round
4 | (Germany) Krahwinkel | 6 | 3 | 3
(United Kingdom) Scriven | 2 | 6 | 6
(France) Henrotin | 7 | 6
(France) Golding | 5 | 2
5 | (United Kingdom) Heeley | 6 | 6
(Italy) Valerio | 2 | 0
Wolfrom | 6 | 7
(Australia) Crawford | 3 | 5

Third round
(United Kingdom) Scriven | 6 | 8
(France) Henrotin | 2 | 6
5 | (United Kingdom) Heeley | 6 | 6
Wolfrom | 2 | 0

Quarterfinals
(United Kingdom) Scriven | 6 | 6
5 | (United Kingdom) Heeley | 2 | 4

==== Section 3 ====
First round
(France) Wyns-Speranza | 3 | 3
(United States) Ingram | 6 | 6
(France) Kleinadel | 2 | 2
(United Kingdom) Thomas | 6 | 6
(France) Barbier | 6 | 6
(France) Freville | 2 | 4
(France) Morel-Deville
6 | (United Kingdom) Whittingstall
(United Kingdom) Dyson | 3 | 2
(France) Gautier | 6 | 6
(Spain) Pons | 4 | 2
(France) Saoutchik | 6 | 6
(Italy) Riboli | 4 | 6 | 9
(France) Gallay | 6 | 2 | 7
(Netherlands) Dros-Canters | 0 | 2
3 | (France) Mathieu | 6 | 6

Second round
(United States) Ingram | 6 | 6
(United Kingdom) Thomas | 2 | 4
(France) Barbier | 6 | 1
6 | (United Kingdom) Whittingstall | 8 | 6
(France) Gautier | 2 | 0
Saoutchik | 6 | 6
(Italy) Riboli | 4 | 2
3 | (France) Mathieu | 6 | 6

Third round
(United States) Ingram | 5 | 4
6 | (United Kingdom) Whittingstall | 7 | 6
(France) Saoutchik | 3 | 2
3 | (France) Mathieu | 6 | 6

Quarterfinals
6 | (United Kingdom) Whittingstall | 2 | 0
3 | (France) Mathieu | 6 | 6

==== Section 4 ====
First round
(United Kingdom) James | 2 | 4
(France) Rosambert | 6 | 6

Second round
(France) Rosambert | 6 | 1 | 6
(Germany) Aussem | 3 | 6 | 4
(France) Goldschmidt | 6 | 6
7 | (Belgium) Sigart | 4 | 3
(France) Pannetier | 2 | 3
(United Kingdom) Stammers | 6 | 6
(France) Fournier | 3 | 0
2 | (United States) Jacobs | 6 | 6

Third round
(France) Rosambert | 6 | 4
(France) Goldschmidt | 8 | 6
(United Kingdom) Stammers | 3 | 6 | 4
2 | (United States) Jacobs | 6 | 3 | 6

Quarterfinals
(France) Goldschmidt | 6 | 1 | 3
2 | (United States) Jacobs | 1 | 6 | 6

| Preceded by 1933 Australian Championships – Women's singles | Grand Slam women's singles | Succeeded by 1933 Wimbledon Championships – Women's singles |
