= 1932 Wimbledon Championships – Women's singles =

Women's singles
- 1932 Wimbledon Championships

Final
- Champion: (United States) Helen Moody
- Runner-up: (United States) Helen Jacobs
- Score: 6–3, 6–1

Details
- Draw: 96 (10Q)
- Seeds: 8

Events
Singles	men	women		boys	girls
Doubles	men	women	mixed	boys	girls
- Wimbledon Championships

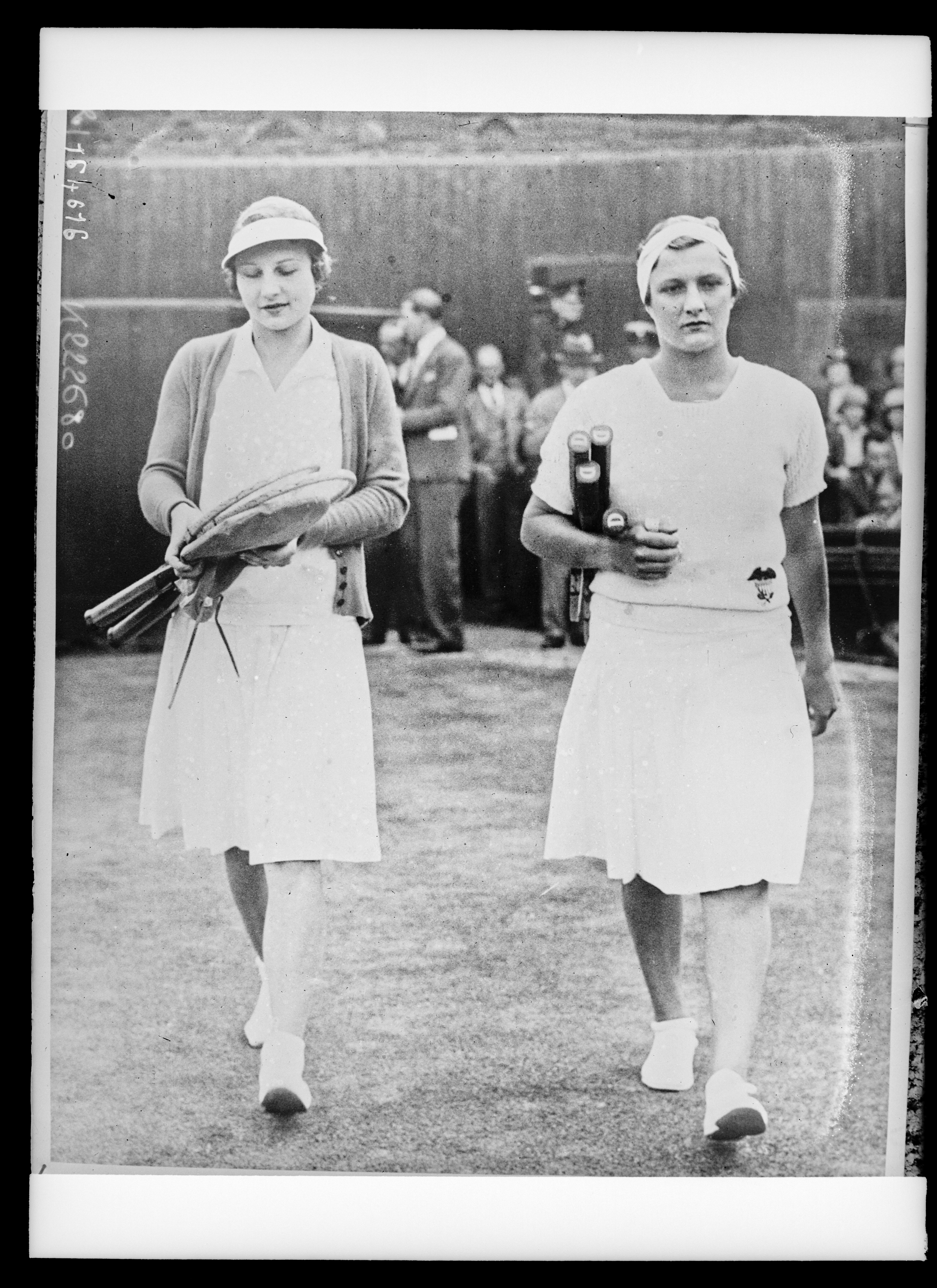
Finalists Helen Moody and Helen Jacobs

Helen Moody defeated Helen Jacobs in the final, 6–3, 6–1 to win the ladies' singles tennis title at the 1932 Wimbledon Championships.

Cilly Aussem was the defending champion, but withdrew before the first round.

== Seeds ==
1. (United States) Helen Moody (champion)
2. (France) Simonne Mathieu (semifinals)
3. (Germany) Hilde Krahwinkel (quarterfinals)
4. (United Kingdom) Eileen Fearnley-Whittingstall (quarterfinals)
5. (United States) Helen Jacobs (final)
6. (United Kingdom) Betty Nuthall (quarterfinals)
7. (Switzerland) Lolette Payot (third round)
8. (United Kingdom) Dorothy Round (quarterfinals)

Click on the seed number of a player to go to their draw section.

== Draw ==
Key

- Q = Qualifier
- WC = Wild card
- LL = Lucky loser
- Alt = Alternate
- ITF = ITF entry
- PR = Protected ranking
- SR = Special ranking
- SE = Special exempt
- JE = Junior exempt
- JR = Junior Accelerator Programme entrant
- CO = College Accelerator Programme entrant
- NG = Next Gen Accelerator Program entrant
- w/o = Walkover
- r = Retired
- d = Defaulted

=== Finals ===
Quarterfinals
1	(United States) Helen Moody	6	6
8	(United Kingdom) Dorothy Round	0	1
4	(United Kingdom) Eileen Fearnley-Whittingstall	6	4	0
(United Kingdom) Mary Heeley	3	6	6
5	(United States) Helen Jacobs	6	6
3	(Germany) Hilde Krahwinkel	2	4
6	(United Kingdom) Betty Nuthall	0	3
2	(France) Simonne Mathieu	6	6

Semifinals
1	(United States) Helen Moody	6	6
(United Kingdom) Mary Heeley	2	0
5	(United States) Helen Jacobs	7	6
2	(France) Simonne Mathieu	5	1

Final
1	(United States) Helen Moody	6	6
5	(United States) Helen Jacobs	3	1

=== Top half ===
==== Section 1 ====
First round

Second round
1	(United States) Helen Moody	6	6
(Netherlands) Madzy Couquerque	1	1
(United Kingdom) Joan Couchman	4	4
(United Kingdom) Winfred Bower	6	6
(United Kingdom) Dorothy Anderson	1	2
(United Kingdom) Mrs HA Lewis	6	6
(United Kingdom) Elsa Haylock	2	8	3
(United Kingdom) Kitty Godfree	6	6	6

Third round
1	(United States) H Moody	6	6
(United Kingdom) W Bower	1	0
(United Kingdom) Mrs HA Lewis	4	2
(United Kingdom) K Godfree	6	6

Fourth round
1	(United States) H Moody	6	6
(United Kingdom) K Godfree	3	0

==== Section 2 ====
First round

Second round
8	(United Kingdom) Dorothy Round	6	6
(Belgium) Josane Sigart	2	0
(United Kingdom) Madge Slaney	6	6
(United Kingdom) MA Thomas	3	2
(United Kingdom) Mabel Clayton	7	1	2
(France) Doris Metaxa	5	6	6
(United States) Dorothy Burke	6	4	6
Q	(United Kingdom) Helen Dyson	2	6	2

Third round
8	(United Kingdom) D Round	6	6
(United Kingdom) M Slaney	3	3
(France) D Metaxa	4	6	6
(United States) D Burke	6	3	3

Fourth round
8	(United Kingdom) D Round	6	6
(France) D Metaxa	1	3

==== Section 3 ====
First round
4	(United Kingdom) Eileen Fearnley-Whittingstall	9	4	6
(United Kingdom) Nancy Lyle	7	6	0
LL	(United Kingdom) Sybil Edwards	6	6
(United Kingdom) Patricia Brazier	3	2
(United Kingdom) Margaret Mellows	6	0	6
(France) Jacqueline Goldschmidt	2	6	1
(United Kingdom) Grace Vaughton	4	1
(United Kingdom) Beatrice Feltham	6	6
Q	(United Kingdom) Betty Boas	0	2
(United Kingdom) Peggy Scriven	6	6
(United Kingdom) Vera Montgomery	6	6
(United Kingdom) Jeanette Morfey	0	3
(United Kingdom) Elsie Pittman	6	6
(United Kingdom) Effie Peters	3	4
(United Kingdom) Joan Lycett	7	6
(Australia) Marjorie Crawford	5	2

Second round
4	(United Kingdom) E Fearnley-Whittingstall	6	4	6
LL	(United Kingdom) S Edwards	3	6	0
(United Kingdom) M Mellows	6	4	3
(United Kingdom) B Feltham	4	6	6
(United Kingdom) M Scriven	6	3	5
(United Kingdom) V Montgomery	3	6	7
(United Kingdom) E Pittman	6	7
(United Kingdom) J Lycett	3	5

Third round
4	(United Kingdom) E Fearnley-Whittingstall	6	6
(United Kingdom) B Feltham	2	2
(United Kingdom) V Montgomery	1	6
(United Kingdom) E Pittman	6	8

Fourth round
4	(United Kingdom) E Fearnley-Whittingstall	10	6
(United Kingdom) E Pittman	8	2

==== Section 4 ====
First round
7	(Switzerland) Lolette Payot	6	6
(United Kingdom) Mildred Nonweiler	2	4
(United Kingdom) Naomi Trentham	6	7
(Germany) Marie Horn	4	5
Q	(United Kingdom) Marjorie Stork	6	8
(United Kingdom) Christabel Wheatcroft	3	6
(United States) Anna Harper	6	0	5
(United Kingdom) Kay Stammers	1	6	7
Q	(United Kingdom) Mrs P Thomas	1	2
(United Kingdom) Ermyntrude Harvey	6	6
(United Kingdom) Peggy Michell	6	3	6
(United Kingdom) Betty Dix	3	6	3
(United States) Elizabeth Ryan	w/o
(United Kingdom) Mary Heeley
(United Kingdom) Sheila Hewitt	2	2
(South Africa) Irene Peacock	6	6

Second round
7	(Switzerland) L Payot	7	6
(United Kingdom) N Trentham	5	4
Q	(United Kingdom) M Stork	5	3
(United Kingdom) K Stammers	7	6
(United Kingdom) E Harvey	0	1
(United Kingdom) M Michell	6	6
(United Kingdom) M Heeley	6	6
(South Africa) I Peacock	3	1

Third round
7	(Switzerland) L Payot	6	1
(United Kingdom) K Stammers	8	6
(United Kingdom) M Michell	2	6	2
(United Kingdom) M Heeley	6	4	6

Fourth round
(United Kingdom) K Stammers	4	3
(United Kingdom) M Heeley	6	6

=== Bottom half ===
==== Section 5 ====
First round
(United Kingdom) Phyllis Satterthwaite	6	7
(United Kingdom) Joan Ingram	1	5
(United Kingdom) Evelyn Goldsworth	9	6	0
(United Kingdom) Enid Clarke	11	4	0^{r}
(France) Colette Rosambert	6	6
(United Kingdom) Betty Uber	4	4
(United Kingdom) Dorothy Jameson	6	6
(United Kingdom) Freda Scott	4	4
(France) Elizabeth Macready	6	6
Q	(United Kingdom) Enid Broadbridge	0	2
(United Kingdom) Dorothy Shepherd-Barron	6	6
(United Kingdom) Betty Soames	0	1
(United Kingdom) Madge List	1	1^{r}
(United Kingdom) Phyllis Covell	6	2
Q	(United Kingdom) Gladys Southwell	1	1
5	(United States) Helen Jacobs	6	6

Second round
(United Kingdom) P Satterthwaite	6	6
(United Kingdom) E Goldsworth	2	2
(France) C Rosambert	3	1
(United Kingdom) D Jameson	6	6
(France) E Macready	0	3
(United Kingdom) D Shepherd-Barron	6	6
(United Kingdom) P Covell	1	2
5	(United States) H Jacobs	6	6

Third round
(United Kingdom) P Satterthwaite	5	5
(United Kingdom) D Jameson	7	7
(United Kingdom) D Shepherd-Barron	2	2
5	(United States) H Jacobs	6	6

Fourth round
(United Kingdom) D Jameson	1	2
5	(United States) H Jacobs	6	6

==== Section 6 ====
First round
(United Kingdom) Violet Owen	3	5
(United Kingdom) Gladys Seel	6	7
(United Kingdom) HM Brooke	6	6
Q	(United Kingdom) Dora Beazley	1	3
(United Kingdom) Freda James
(Germany) Cilly Aussem	w/o
Q	(United Kingdom) Betty Holly	2	1
(United Kingdom) Nora Martin	6	6
(Poland) Jadwiga Jędrzejowska	6	6
(United Kingdom) Yvonne Law	3	4
(United Kingdom) Davinia Townsend	6	4	2
(United Kingdom) Joan Ridley	2	6	6
(United Kingdom) Gwen Sterry	8	4	6
(United Kingdom) Ruth Kirk	6	6	4
(United Kingdom) Phyllis King	2	3
3	(Germany) Hilde Krahwinkel	6	6

Second round
(United Kingdom) G Seel	6	6
(United Kingdom) HM Brooke	4	3
(United Kingdom) W James	6	6
(United Kingdom) N Martin	2	1
(Poland) J Jędrzejowska	6	6
(United Kingdom) J Ridley	2	4
(United Kingdom) G Sterry	6	5	0
3	(Germany) H Krahwinkel	4	7	6

Third round
(United Kingdom) G Seel	2	2
(United Kingdom) W James	6	6
(Poland) J Jędrzejowska	4	4
3	(Germany) H Krahwinkel	6	6

Fourth round
(United Kingdom) W James	4	2
3	(Germany) H Krahwinkel	6	6

==== Section 7 ====
First round

Second round
(United Kingdom) Evelyn Dearman	8	4	1
(United States) Sarah Palfrey	6	6	6
(United Kingdom) Olga Webb	6	6
(Netherlands) E Belzer	4	2
(United Kingdom) Andree Lucas	3	4
(United Kingdom) Susan Noel	6	6
(United Kingdom) Sonia Mavrogordato	1	1
6	(United Kingdom) Betty Nuthall	6	6

Third round
(United States) S Palfrey	6	6
(United Kingdom) O Webb	2	3
(United Kingdom) S Noel	2	6	2
6	(United Kingdom) B Nuthall	6	4	6

Fourth round
(United States) S Palfrey	6	7
6	(United Kingdom) B Nuthall	8	9

==== Section 8 ====
First round

Second round
(United Kingdom) Doris Eastley	6	2	6
Q	(United Kingdom) Molly Hargreaves	0	6	4
(Spain) Bella Pons	4	6	8
(South Africa) Mrs WG Lowe	6	2	10
(Canada) Olive Wade	w/o
(Italy) Lucia Valerio
Q	(United Kingdom) Dorothy Crichton	1	1
2	(France) Simonne Mathieu	6	6

Third round
(United Kingdom) D Eastley	5	3
(South Africa) Mrs WG Lowe	7	6
(Italy) L Valerio	7	1	2
2	(France) S Mathieu	5	6	6

Fourth round
(South Africa) Mrs WG Lowe	4	6
2	(France) S Mathieu	6	8

Preceded by 1932 French Championships	Grand Slams; Women's Singles	Succeeded by 1932 U.S. National Championships
