= 1935 French Championships (tennis) =

- Date: 21 May – 2 June 1935
- Edition: 40th
- Category: 11th Grand Slam (ITF)
- Surface: Clay
- Location: Paris (XVI^{e}), France
- Venue: Stade Roland Garros

Champions

Men's singles
- (United Kingdom) Fred Perry

Women's singles
- (Germany) Hilde Sperling

Men's doubles
- (Australia) Jack Crawford / (Australia) Adrian Quist

Women's doubles
- (United Kingdom) Margaret Scriven / (United Kingdom) Kay Stammers

Mixed doubles
- (France) Lolette Payot / (France) Marcel Bernard
← 1934 ·	French Championships	· 1936 →

The 1935 French Championships (now known as the French Open) was a tennis tournament that took place on the outdoor clay courts at the Stade Roland-Garros in Paris, France. The tournament ran from 21 May until 2 June. It was the 40th staging of the French Championships and the second Grand Slam tournament of the year. Fred Perry and Hilde Sperling won the singles titles.

== Finals ==
=== Men's singles ===
(United Kingdom) Fred Perry (GBR) defeated (Germany) Gottfried von Cramm (GER) 6–3, 3–6, 6–1, 6–3

=== Women's singles ===
(Germany) Hilde Sperling (GER) defeated (France) Simonne Mathieu (FRA) 6–2, 6–1

=== Men's doubles ===
(Australia) Jack Crawford / (Australia) Adrian Quist defeated (Australia) Vivian McGrath / (Australia) Don Turnbull 6–1, 6–4, 6–2

=== Women's doubles ===
(United Kingdom) Margaret Scriven / (United Kingdom) Kay Stammers defeated (France) Ida Adamoff / (Germany) Hilde Krahwinkel Sperling 6–4, 6–0

=== Mixed doubles ===
(France) Lolette Payot / (France) Marcel Bernard defeated (France) Sylvie Jung Henrotin / (France) André Martin-Legeay 4–6, 6–2, 6–4

Preceded by 1935 Australian Championships	Grand Slams	Succeeded by 1935 Wimbledon Championships
