= 1934 French Championships (tennis) =

- Date: 23 May – 2 June 1934
- Edition: 39th
- Category: 10th Grand Slam (ITF)
- Surface: Clay
- Location: Paris (XVI^{e}), France
- Venue: Stade Roland Garros

Champions

Men's singles
- (Germany) Gottfried von Cramm

Women's singles
- (United Kingdom) Margaret Scriven

Men's doubles
- (France) Jean Borotra / (France) Jacques Brugnon

Women's doubles
- (France) Simonne Mathieu / (United States) Elizabeth Ryan

Mixed doubles
- (France) Colette Rosambert / (France) Jean Borotra
← 1933 ·	French Championships	· 1935 →

The 1934 French Championships (now known as the French Open) was a tennis tournament that took place on the outdoor clay courts at the Stade Roland-Garros in Paris, France. The tournament ran from 23 May until 2 June. It was the 39th staging of the French Championships and the second Grand Slam tournament of the year. Gottfried von Cramm and Margaret Scriven won the singles titles.

== Finals ==
=== Men's singles ===
(Germany) Gottfried von Cramm (GER) defeated (Australia) Jack Crawford (AUS) 6–4, 7–9, 3–6, 7–5, 6–3

=== Women's singles ===
(United Kingdom) Margaret Scriven (GBR) defeated (United States) Helen Jacobs (USA) 7–5, 4–6, 6–1

=== Men's doubles ===
(France) Jean Borotra / (France) Jacques Brugnon defeated (Australia) Jack Crawford / (Australia) Vivian McGrath 11–9, 6–3, 2–6, 4–6, 9–7

=== Women's doubles ===
(France) Simonne Mathieu / (United States) Elizabeth Ryan defeated (United States) Helen Jacobs / (United States) Sarah Palfrey Cooke 3–6, 6–4, 6–2

=== Mixed doubles ===
(France) Colette Rosambert / (France) Jean Borotra defeated (United States) Elizabeth Ryan / (Australia) Adrian Quist 6–2, 6–4

Preceded by 1934 Australian Championships	Grand Slams	Succeeded by 1934 Wimbledon Championships
