= 1934 French Championships – Women's singles =

Women's singles
- 1934 French Championships

Final
- Champion: (United Kingdom) Margaret Scriven
- Runner-up: (United States) Helen Jacobs
- Score: 7–5, 4–6, 6–1

Details
- Seeds: 8

Events
| Singles | men | women |
| Doubles | men | women |
- French Championships

Margaret Scriven defeated Helen Jacobs 7–5, 4–6, 6–1 in the final to win the women's singles tennis title at the 1934 French Championships.

== Seeds ==
The seeded players are listed below. Margaret Scriven is the champion; others show the round in which they were eliminated.

1. (United States) Helen Jacobs (finalist)
2. (United Kingdom) Margaret Scriven (champion)
3. (United States) Alice Marble (second round)
4. (United Kingdom) Betty Nuthall (third round)
5. (France) Simonne Mathieu (semifinals)
6. (United Kingdom) Kay Stammers (quarterfinals)
7. (France) Sylvie Henrotin (second round)
8. (Switzerland) Lolette Payot (quarterfinals)

== Draw ==
=== Key ===
- Q = Qualifier
- WC = Wild card
- LL = Lucky loser
- r = Retired

=== Finals ===
Quarterfinals
1 | (United States) Helen Jacobs | 6 | 1 | 8
8 | (Switzerland) Lolette Payot | 3 | 6 | 6
(Italy) Lucia Valerio | 3 | 2
5 | (France) Simonne Mathieu | 6 | 6
6 | (United Kingdom) Kay Stammers | 4 | 2
(Germany) Cilly Aussem | 6 | 6
(United Kingdom) Nancy Lyle | 1 | 1
2 | (United Kingdom) Margaret Scriven | 6 | 6

Semifinals
1 | (United States) Helen Jacobs | 6 | 6
5 | (France) Simonne Mathieu | 2 | 2
(Germany) Cilly Aussem | 5 | 3
2 | (United Kingdom) Margaret Scriven | 7 | 6

Finals
1 | (United States) Helen Jacobs | 5 | 6 | 1
2 | (United Kingdom) Margaret Scriven | 7 | 4 | 6

=== Earlier rounds ===
==== Section 1 ====
First round
(France) Pannetier | 6 | 10
(Australia) Hopman | 1 | 8
(France) Rosambert
(Germany) Prenn
(United Kingdom) Dearman | 6 | 6
(France) Orlandini | 2 | 3

Second round
1 | (United States) Jacobs | 6 | 6
(United Kingdom) Yorke | 3 | 1
(Greece) Xydis | 3 | 3
(United Kingdom) Hardwick | 6 | 6
8 | (Switzerland) Payot | 6 | 6
(France) Pannetier | 3 | 0
(France) Rosambert | 6 | 6
(United Kingdom) Dearman | 3 | 1

Third round
1 | (United States) Jacobs | 6 | 6
(United Kingdom) Hardwick | 0 | 1
8 | (Switzerland) Payot | 7 | 4 | 6
(France) Rosambert | 5 | 6 | 4

Quarterfinals
1 | (United States) Jacobs | 6 | 1 | 8
8 | (Switzerland) Payot | 3 | 6 | 6

==== Section 2 ====
First round
4 | (United Kingdom) Nuthall | 6 | 6
(France) Varin | 4 | 4
(Hungary) Baumgarten | 3 | 3
(France) Adamson | 6 | 6
(Italy) Valerio | 6 | 6
(France) Iribarne | 3 | 2
(United Kingdom) Thomas | 5 | 2
(France) Howard | 7 | 6
(United Kingdom) Wheatcroft
5 | (France) Mathieu
(France) Row | 4 | 8
(United States) Andrus | 6 | 10
(United States) Babcock | 6 | 6
(France) Wyns-Speranza | 0 | 2
(France) Goronitchenko | 1 | 5
(Germany) Horn | 6 | 7

Second round
4 | (United Kingdom) Nuthall | 6 | 6
(France) Adamson | 4 | 4
(Italy) Valerio | 6 | 6
(France) Howard | 2 | 3
5 | (France) Mathieu | 6 | 6
(United States) Andrus | 1 | 1
(United States) Babcock | 4 | 1
(Germany) Horn | 6 | 6

Third round
4 | (United Kingdom) Nuthall | 6 | 4
(Italy) Valerio | 8 | 6
5 | (France) Mathieu | 6 | 7
(Germany) Horn | 3 | 5

Quarterfinals
(Italy) Valerio | 3 | 2
5 | (France) Mathieu | 6 | 6

==== Section 3 ====
First round
(United States) Cruickshank | 6 | 6
(France) Barbier | 0 | 2
(Australia) Hartigan | 6 | 6
(France) Goldschmidt | 4 | 4
(United Kingdom) Noel | 6 | 6
(France) Peyre | 4 | 2
(France) Adamoff | 3 | 6 | 2
6 | (United Kingdom) Stammers | 6 | 4 | 6
(Poland) Jędrzejowska | 6 | 6
Luzzatti | 4 | 3
(France) Charnelet
(United Kingdom) Satterthwaite
(France) Gallay | 1 | 1
(Germany) Aussem | 6 | 6
(France) Morel-Deville | 1 | 1
3 | (United States) Marble | 6 | 6

Second round
(United States) Cruickshank | 6 | 5 | 3
(Australia) Hartigan | 1 | 7 | 6
(United Kingdom) Noel | 3 | 4
6 | (United Kingdom) Stammers | 6 | 6
(Poland) Jędrzejowska | 8 | 6
(France) Charnelet | 6 | 1
(Germany) Aussem
3 | (United States) Marble

Third round
(Australia) Hartigan | 3 | 4
6 | (United Kingdom) Stammers | 6 | 6
(Poland) Jędrzejowska | 6 | 4 | 6
(Germany) Aussem | 3 | 6 | 8

Quarterfinals
6 | (United Kingdom) Stammers | 4 | 2
(Germany) Aussem | 6 | 6

==== Section 4 ====
First round
(France) Aubert | 6 | 6
(United Kingdom) McAlpine | 4 | 2
(United States) Ryan
(United Kingdom) Lyle
(Australia) Molesworth | 6 | 6
(Italy) Manzutto | 2 | 3

Second round
(France) Aubert | 1 | 3
(United Kingdom) Lyle | 6 | 6
(Australia) Molesworth
7 | (France) Henrotin
(France) Horner | 4 | 3
(United States) Palfrey | 6 | 6
(Netherlands) Couquerque | 6 | 4 | 3
2 | (United Kingdom) Scriven | 2 | 6 | 6

Third round
(United Kingdom) Lyle | 6 | 6
(Australia) Molesworth | 4 | 2
(United States) Palfrey | 4 | 4
2 | (United Kingdom) Scriven | 6 | 6

Quarterfinals
(United Kingdom) Lyle | 1 | 1
2 | (United Kingdom) Scriven | 6 | 6

| Preceded by 1934 Australian Championships – Women's singles | Grand Slam women's singles | Succeeded by 1934 Wimbledon Championships – Women's singles |
