= 1933 French Championships (tennis) =

- Date: 25 May – 5 June 1933
- Edition: 38th
- Category: 9th Grand Slam (ITF)
- Surface: Clay
- Location: Paris (XVI^{e}), France
- Venue: Stade Roland Garros

Champions

Men's singles
- (Australia) Jack Crawford

Women's singles
- (United Kingdom) Margaret Scriven

Men's doubles
- (United Kingdom) Pat Hughes / (United Kingdom) Fred Perry

Women's doubles
- (France) Simonne Mathieu / (United States) Elizabeth Ryan

Mixed doubles
- (United Kingdom) Margaret Scriven / (Australia) Jack Crawford
← 1932 ·	French Championships	· 1934 →

The 1933 French Championship (now known as the French Open) was a tennis tournament that took place on the outdoor clay courts at the Stade Roland-Garros in Paris, France. The tournament ran from 25 May until 5 June. It was the 38th edition of the French Championships and the second Grand Slam tournament of the year. Jack Crawford and Margaret Scriven won the singles title. Jack Crawford was the first non-Frenchman to win the French Open men's singles title.

== Finals ==
=== Men's singles ===
(Australia) Jack Crawford (AUS) defeated (France) Henri Cochet (FRA) 8–6, 6–1, 6–3

=== Women's singles ===
(United Kingdom) Margaret Scriven (GBR) defeated (France) Simonne Mathieu (FRA) 6–2, 4–6, 6–4

=== Men's doubles ===
(United Kingdom) Pat Hughes / (United Kingdom) Fred Perry defeated (Australia) Adrian Quist / (Australia) Vivian McGrath 6–2, 6–4, 2–6, 7–5

=== Women's doubles ===
(France) Simonne Mathieu / (United States) Elizabeth Ryan defeated (France) Sylvie Jung Henrotin / (France) Colette Rosambert 6–1, 6–3

=== Mixed doubles ===
(United Kingdom) Margaret Scriven / (Australia) Jack Crawford defeated (United Kingdom) Betty Nuthall / (United Kingdom) Fred Perry 6–2, 6–3

Preceded by 1933 Australian Championships	Grand Slams	Succeeded by 1933 Wimbledon Championships
