= 1936 French Championships (tennis) =

- Date: 24 May – 1 June 1936
- Edition: 41st
- Category: 12th Grand Slam (ITF)
- Surface: Clay
- Location: Paris (XVI^{e}), France
- Venue: Stade Roland Garros

Champions

Men's singles
- (Germany) Gottfried von Cramm

Women's singles
- (Denmark) Hilde Sperling

Men's doubles
- (France) Jean Borotra / (France) Marcel Bernard

Women's doubles
- (France) Simonne Mathieu / (United Kingdom) Billie Yorke

Mixed doubles
- (United Kingdom) Billie Yorke / (France) Marcel Bernard
← 1935 ·	French Championships	· 1937 →

The 1936 French Championships (now known as the French Open) was a tennis tournament that took place on the outdoor clay courts at the Stade Roland-Garros in Paris, France. The tournament ran from 24 May until 1 June. It was the 41st staging of the French Championships and the second Grand Slam tournament of the year.

== Finals ==
=== Men's singles ===
(Germany) Gottfried von Cramm defeated (United Kingdom) Fred Perry 6–0, 2–6, 6–2, 2–6, 6–0

=== Women's singles ===
(Denmark) Hilde Sperling defeated (France) Simonne Mathieu 6–3, 6–4

=== Men's doubles ===
(France) Jean Borotra / (France) Marcel Bernard defeated (United Kingdom) Charles Tuckey / (United Kingdom) Pat Hughes 6–2, 3–6, 9–7, 6–1

=== Women's doubles ===
(France) Simonne Mathieu / (United Kingdom) Billie Yorke defeated (United Kingdom) Susan Noel / (Poland) Jadwiga Jędrzejowska 2–6, 6–4, 6–4

=== Mixed doubles ===
(United Kingdom) Billie Yorke / (France) Marcel Bernard defeated (France) Sylvie Jung Henrotin / (France) André Martin-Legeay 7–5, 6–8, 6–3

Preceded by 1936 Australian Championships	Grand Slams	Succeeded by 1936 Wimbledon Championships
