= 1937 French Championships (tennis) =

- Date: 18–30 May 1937
- Edition: 42nd
- Category: 13th Grand Slam (ITF)
- Surface: Clay
- Location: Paris (XVI^{e}), France
- Venue: Stade Roland Garros

Champions

Men's singles
- (Germany) Henner Henkel

Women's singles
- (Denmark) Hilde Sperling

Men's doubles
- (Germany) Gottfried von Cramm / (Germany) Henner Henkel

Women's doubles
- (France) Simonne Mathieu / (United Kingdom) Billie Yorke

Mixed doubles
- (France) Simonne Mathieu / (France) Yvon Petra
← 1936 ·	French Championships	· 1938 →

The 1937 French Championships (now known as the French Open) was a tennis tournament that took place on the outdoor clay courts at the Stade Roland-Garros in Paris, France. The tournament ran from 18 May until 30 May. It was the 42nd staging of the French Championships and the second Grand Slam tournament of the year.

== Finals ==
=== Men's singles ===
(Germany) Henner Henkel defeated (United Kingdom) Bunny Austin 6–1, 6–4, 6–3

=== Women's singles ===
(Denmark) Hilde Sperling defeated (France) Simonne Mathieu 6–2, 6–4

=== Men's doubles ===
(Germany) Gottfried von Cramm / (Germany) Henner Henkel defeated (South Africa) Vernon Kirby / (South Africa) Norman Farquharson 6–4, 7–5, 3–6, 6–1

=== Women's doubles ===
(France) Simonne Mathieu / (United Kingdom) Billie Yorke defeated (United States) Dorothy Andrus / (France) Sylvie Jung Henrotin 3–6, 6–2, 6–2

=== Mixed doubles ===
(France) Simonne Mathieu / (France) Yvon Petra defeated (Germany) Marie-Luise Horn / (France) Roland Journu 7–5, 7–5

Preceded by 1937 Australian Championships	Grand Slams	Succeeded by 1937 Wimbledon Championships
