= Sylvie Jung Henrotin =

French tennis player

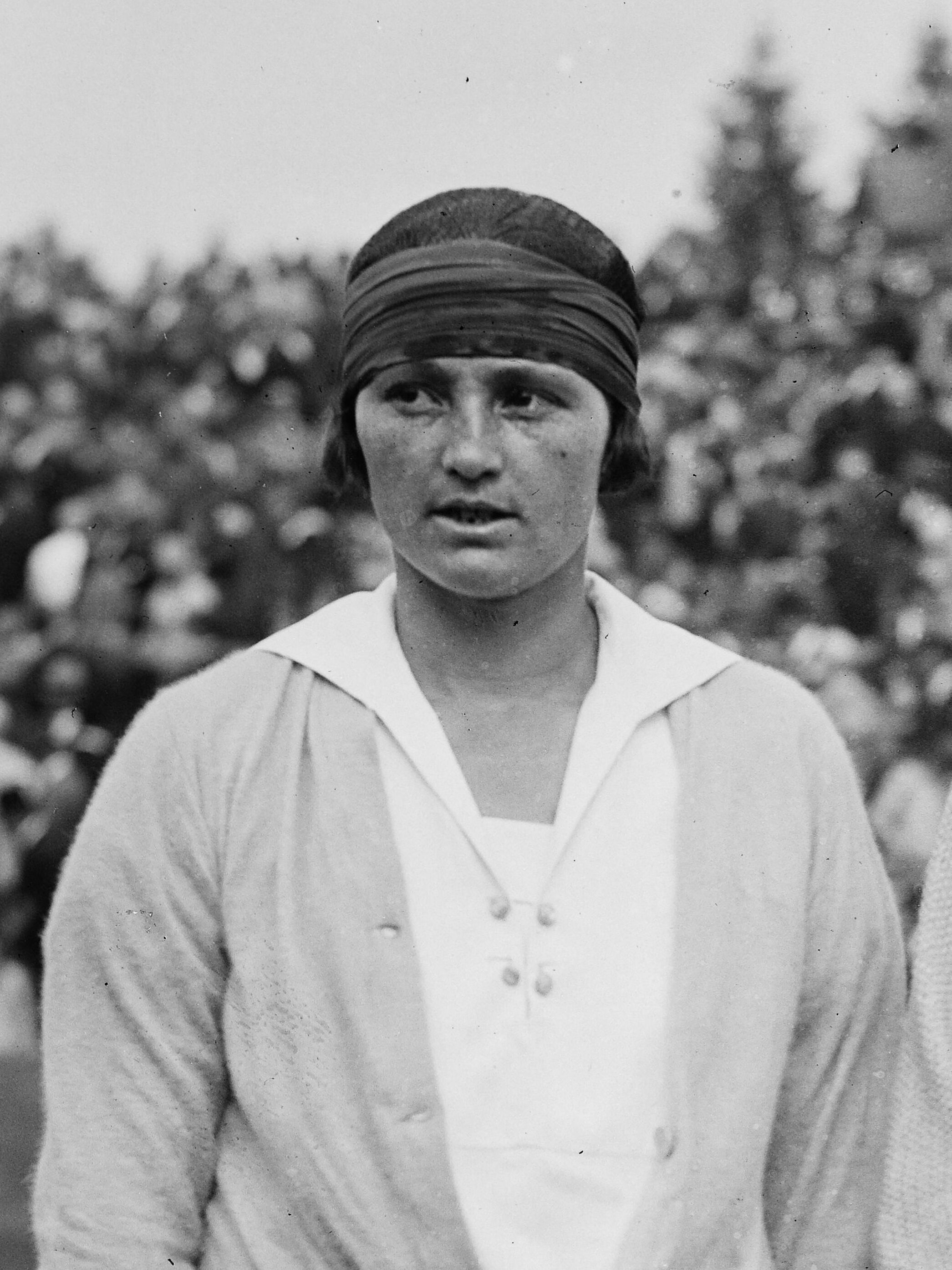
- Country (sports): France
- Born: 10 July 1904; Le Havre, France
- Died: 15 December 1970 (aged 66); Lake Placid, New York, US

Singles

Grand Slam singles results
- French Open: QF (1929, 1935, 1936, 1937, 1938)
- Wimbledon: 3R (1933, 1939)

Doubles

Grand Slam doubles results
- French Open: F (1928, 1933, 1937)
- Wimbledon: F (1934)

Grand Slam mixed doubles results
- French Open: F (1935, 1936)
- Wimbledon: QF (1936)
- US Open: F (1937)

Sylvie Jung Henrotin (née Jung; French pronunciation: [silvi ɑ̃ʁɔˈtɛ̃] German pronunciation: [jʊŋ];10 July 1904 – 15 December 1970) was a French tennis player who was active during the late 1920 and the 1930s. She had her best results in the doubles event, finishing runner-up in seven Grand Slam doubles and mixed-doubles competitions.

She participated in the singles event of the Wimbledon Championships from 1930 to 1939, and her best result during this period was reaching the fourth round in 1933 and 1939. Henrotin also took part in the French Championships, reaching the quarterfinals in the singles on five occasions (1929, 1935, 1936, 1937, 1938).

She was a runner-up in the singles event of the 1933 German Championships after losing the final in straight-sets loss to Hilde Krahwinkel.

In August 1936, she won the singles title at the Eastern Grass Court Championships in Rye, New York with victories against Alice Marble and Helen Pedersen in the semifinals and final respectively. In January 1937, she won the singles, doubles and mixed-doubles title at the U.S. Indoor Championships.

== Grand Slam tournament finals ==
=== Doubles: 4 (4 runner-ups) ===
Result	Year	Championship	Surface	Partner	Opponents	Score
Loss	1928	French Championships	Clay	(France) Suzanne Devé	(France) Eileen Bennett (France) Phoebe Holcroft	0–6, 2–6
Loss	1933	French Championships	Clay	(France) Colette Rosambert	(France) Simonne Mathieu (United States) Elizabeth Ryan	1–6, 3–6
Loss	1933	Wimbledon	Grass	(United States) Dorothy Andrus	(France) Simonne Mathieu (United States) Elizabeth Ryan	3–6, 3–6
Loss	1937	French Championships	Clay	(United States) Dorothy Andrus	(France) Simonne Mathieu (United Kingdom) Billie Yorke	6–3, 2–6, 2–6

=== Mixed doubles: 3 (3 runner-ups) ===
Result	Year	Championship	Surface	Partner	Opponents	Score
Loss	1935	French Championships	Clay	(France) André Martin-Legeay	(Switzerland) Lolette Payot (France) Marcel Bernard	6–4, 2–6, 4–6
Loss	1936	French Championships	Clay	(France) André Martin-Legeay	(United Kingdom) Billie Yorke (France) Marcel Bernard	5–7, 8–6, 3–6
Loss	1937	US Championships	Grass	(France) Yvon Petra	(United States) Sarah Palfrey (United States) Don Budge	2–6, 10–8, 0–6

== Grand Slam tournament timelines ==
Key
W	F	SF	QF	#R	RR	Q#	DNQ	A	NH

(W) winner; (F) finalist; (SF) semifinalist; (QF) quarterfinalist; (#R) rounds 4, 3, 2, 1; (RR) round-robin stage; (Q#) qualification round; (DNQ) did not qualify; (A) absent; (NH) not held; (SR) strike rate (events won / competed); (W–L) win–loss record.

=== Singles ===
Tournament	1928	1929	1930	1931	1932	1933	1934	1935	1936	1937	1938	1939	1940	Career SR
Australian Open	A	A	A	A	A	A	A	A	A	A	A	A	A	0 / 0
French Championships	2R	QF	1R	3R	3R	3R	2R	QF	QF	QF	QF	A	A	0 / 11
Wimbledon	A	A	1R	A	A	4R	3R	2R	3R	2R	2R	4R	A	0 / 8
US Championships	A	A	A	A	A	A	A	A	A	1R	1R	A	A	0 / 2
SR	0 / 1	0 / 1	0 / 2	0 / 1	0 / 1	0 / 2	0 / 2	0 / 2	0 / 2	0 / 3	0 / 3	0 / 1	0 / 0	0 / 21

=== Doubles ===
Tournament	1928	1929	1930	1931	1932	1933	1934	1935	1936	1937	1938	1939	1940	Career SR
Australian Open	A	A	A	A	A	A	A	A	A	A	A	A	A	0 / 0
French Championships	F	SF	QF	SF	2R	F	SF	SF	QF	F	2R	A	A	0 / 11
Wimbledon	A	A	SF	A	A	3R	F	3R	SF	SF	SF	1R	A	0 / 8
US Championships	A	A	A	A	A	A	A	A	SF	3R	QF	SF	QF	0 / 5
SR	0 / 1	0 / 1	0 / 2	0 / 1	0 / 1	0 / 2	0 / 2	0 / 2	0 / 3	0 / 3	0 / 3	0 / 2	0 / 1	0 / 24
