= Margaret Scriven =

British tennis player

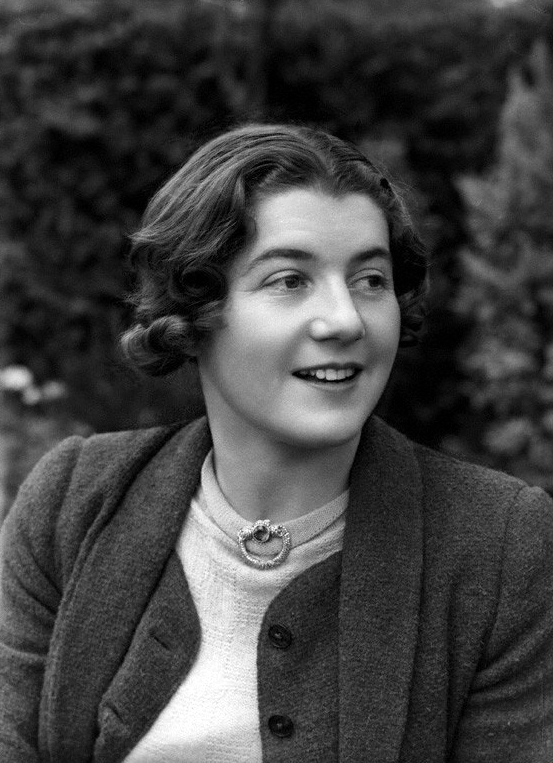
- Full name: Margaret Croft Scriven-Vivian
- Country (sports): United Kingdom
- Born: 12 August 1912 Leeds, England
- Died: 25 January 2001 (aged 88) Haslemere, England
- Plays: Left-handed (one-handed backhand)
- Int. Tennis HoF: 2016 (member page)

Singles
- Highest ranking: No. 5 (1933, A. Wallis Myers)

Grand Slam singles results
- French Open: W (1933, 1934)
- Wimbledon: QF (1931, 1933, 1934, 1937)

Doubles

Grand Slam doubles results
- French Open: W (1935)
- Wimbledon: SF ( 1934)
- US Open: QF (1933)

Grand Slam mixed doubles results
- French Open: W (1933)
- Wimbledon: QF (1937)
- US Open: SF (1933)

Margaret Croft Scriven-Vivian (née Scriven; 17 August 1912 – 25 January 2001) was a British tennis player and the first woman from that country to win the singles title at the French Championships in 1933. She also won the singles title at the 1934 French Championships, defeating Helen Jacobs in the final. She was ranked No. 5 in the world in 1933 and 1934.

== Early life ==
Margaret Scriven was born on 18 August 1912 at Chapel Allerton, Leeds. She was educated at home. Her parents were club level tennis players and she played the game from an early age, playing on holiday and entering local tournaments. According to one source, there was a tennis court at her family home and she was coached by her father, Edgar Scriven and by her mother.

== Career ==
Scriven won the British Junior Championships held at Wimbledon in September 1929. In the final, Scriven defeated Miss P. Burt from Nottingham, 6–1, 6–3.

In June 1930, Scriven played at the Wimbledon Championships for the first time, where she was beaten in the first round by Miss K. le Messurier.

At Wimbledon in 1931, Scriven, was far more successful than at first attempt in the previous year. She reached the quarterfinals where she was beaten by the French player Simonne Mathieu in the sets.

In 1932 she won the singles title at the British Covered Court Championships, played on the wooden courts at the Queen's Club, defeating Kay Stammers in the final.

For the 1933 French Championships, Scriven was not selected to go with the official British touring party. Instead, she travelled to Paris independently. After beating top British players Mary Heeley and Betty Nuthall on her way to the final, Scriven won the tournament, beating Simonne Mathieu in the final. She also triumphed in the mixed doubles, partnered by the Australian player, Jack Crawford. In early August 1933, Scriven was part of the losing British team in the Wightman Cup held at Forest Hills, New York. Later in the same month, Scriven was at Forest Hills for the U.S. Championships. In the singles, she reached the last 16 of the tournament, being knocked out by the American, Josephine Cruickshank. She also competed in the doubles and mixed doubles at the championships. Partnered by the Australian player Jack Crawford, Scriven reached the semi-finals of the mixed doubles.

In May 1934, Scriven was back at the French Championships, this time as part of the official British team. On 3 June 1934, Scriven retained her French title, beating Helen Jacobs of America, 7–5, 4–6, 6–1. The final started at the late time of 6.30pm and, after two sets had been played, both players appealed against the light. The appeal was turned down, however, and the match continued in twilight. After 3 more games, with Scriven leading 2–1, Jacobs appealed again against the light but was turned down. Scriven went on to win all the remaining games.

At the French Championships in 1935, Scriven was unable to win the singles title for the third time, losing in the semifinals to Mathieu. She did win the doubles with Katherine Stammers.

Scriven was the last British woman to win the same Grand Slam singles tournament for two consecutive years. In addition, she was the first left-handed woman to win a Grand Slam singles title and was the only unseeded woman ever to win the French Championships or French Open until the 2017 singles title was won by Jeļena Ostapenko.

She played for the British Wightman Cup team in 1933, 1934, and 1938.

According to A. Wallis Myers of The Daily Telegraph and the Daily Mail, Scriven-Vivian was ranked in the world top 10 from 1933 through 1935, reaching a career high of World No. 5 in 1933 and 1934.

== Personal life ==
Scriven married Harvey Vivian on 28 November 1940 who was a house master and a wartime RAF officer. The couple had a son and a daughter.

== Grand Slam finals ==
=== Singles (2 titles) ===
Result	Year	Championship	Surface	Opponent	Score
Win	1933	French Championships	Clay	(France) Simonne Mathieu	6–2, 4–6, 6–4
Win	1934	French Championships (2)	Clay	(United States) Helen Jacobs	7–5, 4–6, 6–1

=== Doubles (1 title) ===
Result	Year	Championship	Surface	Partner	Opponents	Score
Win	1935	French Championships	Clay	(United Kingdom) Kay Stammers	(France) Ida Adamoff (Denmark) Hilde Krahwinkel Sperling	6–4, 6–0

=== Mixed doubles (1 title) ===
Result	Year	Championship	Surface	Partner	Opponents	Score
Win	1933	French Championships	Clay	(Australia) Jack Crawford	(United Kingdom) Betty Nuthall (United Kingdom) Fred Perry	6–2, 6–3

== Grand Slam singles tournament timeline ==
Key
W	F	SF	QF	#R	RR	Q#	DNQ	A	NH

(W) winner; (F) finalist; (SF) semifinalist; (QF) quarterfinalist; (#R) rounds 4, 3, 2, 1; (RR) round-robin stage; (Q#) qualification round; (DNQ) did not qualify; (A) absent; (NH) not held; (SR) strike rate (events won / competed); (W–L) win–loss record.

Tournament	1930	1931	1932	1933	1934	1935	1936	1937	1938	1939	1940	1941–1944	1945	1946^{1}	1947^{1}	Career SR
Australian Championships	A	A	A	A	A	A	A	A	A	A	A	NH	NH	A	A	0 / 0
French Championships	A	A	2R	W	W	SF	2R	QF	A	A	NH	R	A	A	A	2 / 6
Wimbledon	1R	QF	2R	QF	QF	3R	1R	QF	4R	4R	NH	NH	NH	4R	3R	0 / 12
US Championships	A	A	A	3R	A	A	A	A	A	A	A	A	A	A	A	0 / 1
SR	0 / 1	0 / 1	0 / 2	1 / 3	1 / 2	0 / 2	0 / 2	0 / 2	0 / 1	0 / 1	0 / 0	0 / 0	0 / 0	0 / 1	0 / 1	2 / 19

R = tournament restricted to French nationals and held under German occupation.

^{1}In 1946 and 1947, the French Championships were held after Wimbledon.

== See also ==
- Performance timelines for all female tennis players since 1978 who reached at least one Grand Slam final
