= Kay Stammers =

British tennis player (1914–2005)

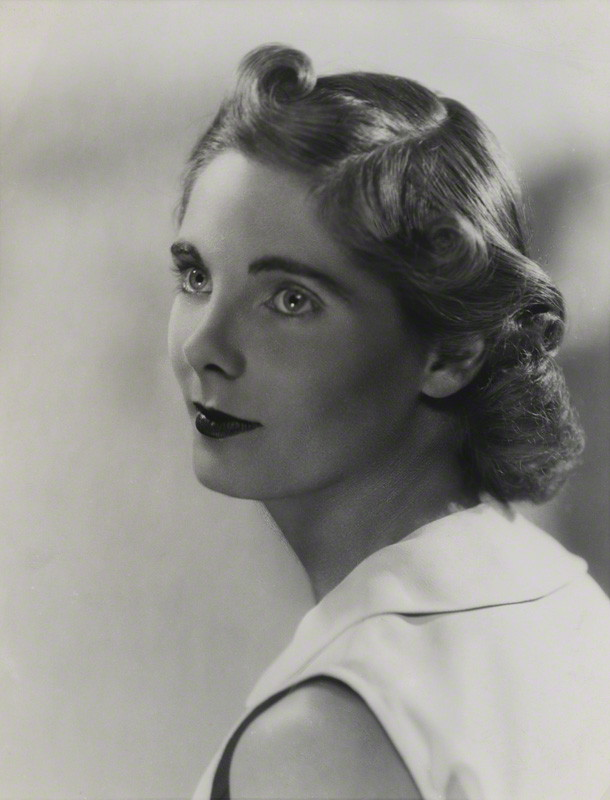
- Full name: Katherine Esther Stammers
- Country (sports): United Kingdom
- Born: 3 April 1914 St Albans, Hertfordshire, England
- Died: 23 December 2005 (aged 91) Louisville, Kentucky, U.S.
- Turned pro: 1930 (amateur)
- Retired: 1949
- Plays: Left-handed

Singles
- Career record: 418-111 (79.0%)
- Career titles: 44
- Highest ranking: No. 2 (1939)

Grand Slam singles results
- French Open: QF (1934)
- Wimbledon: F (1939)
- US Open: SF (1935, 1936, 1939)

Doubles

Grand Slam doubles results
- French Open: W (1935)
- Wimbledon: W (1935, 1936)
- US Open: F (1939)

Grand Slam mixed doubles results
- US Open: F (1935)

Katherine "Kay" Esther Stammers (3 April 1914 – 23 December 2005) was a tennis player from the United Kingdom.

== Career ==
Stammers was born on 3 April 1914 in St Albans, United Kingdom where her parents taught her to play tennis on the grass court at their family home. Left-handed and with a good forehand, Stammers played an attacking style of tennis and was trained by Dan Maskell.

Stammers played when Helen Wills Moody, Helen Jacobs, Alice Marble, and Pauline Betz dominated. But Stammers defeated Jacobs in the semifinals of the 1939 Wimbledon Championships and in singles matches at the 1935 and 1936 Wightman Cup. At the 1935 Kent Championships in Beckenham, England, Stammers became the first British player to beat Wills Moody in 11 years.

According to A. Wallis Myers and John Olliff of The Daily Telegraph and the Daily Mail, Stammers was ranked in the world top ten in 1935, 1936, 1938, 1939, and 1946, reaching a career high of world No. 2 in those rankings in 1939.

Stammers won the women's doubles title at the Wimbledon Championships in 1935 and 1936 with partner Freda James. She also won the women's doubles title at the 1935 French International Championships with partner Peggy Scriven. Her best performances in women's doubles at the U. S. National Championships were in 1936, 1937, and 1938 when she reached the semifinals and in 1939 when she reached the final. In the 1936 semifinal, she and partner Marble were defeated by Jacobs and Sarah Palfrey Fabyan 6–2, 21–19. In the 1939 final, she and partner Freda James Hammersley lost to Marble and Palfrey Fabyan 6–1, 6–2.

Her other career singles highlights include winning the Surrey Hard Court Championships on clay courts four times (1932–1934, 1936), the Aldeburgh Open Hard Courts (1931).

== Appearance ==
Stammers' physical appearance ensured that she attracted more than the usual interest from the press and public. In 1936, for example, an article in Time magazine described her as "pretty Kay Stammers, whom English critics like to describe as the 'typical' British girl tennist, and who likes lacrosse, cricket, lump sugar and planters' punches." Stammers' tennis clothes were much detailed in the newspapers. She designed her own shorts in uncrushable linen cut full to four inches above the knee and wore them with an open-necked shirt. While playing on the west coast of the United States, Stammers visited Hollywood studios and had a screen test. She dated John F. Kennedy and was photographed with him at the Kennedy family's Hyannis Port compound. She said that JFK was "spoilt by women. I think he could snap his fingers and they'd come running. And of course he was terribly attractive and rich and unmarried – a terrific catch really ... I thought he was divine."

== Personal life ==
31 Jan 1940 in Westminster, England, Stammers married Michael Menzies, then in the Welsh Guards. During World War II, Stammers played exhibition matches on behalf of the Red Cross and served as an ambulance driver. When the war ended, she captained Britain's Wightman Cup team for a couple of years. In 1949, she and her husband moved to South Africa, where Menzies set up Hill Samuel's South African operation. They remained there for nearly 20 years, until he was transferred to New York City to head the office there. She had two sons and a daughter with him.

After her divorce from Menzies in 1974, she married lawyer Thomas Walker Bullitt, whom she had met on the American tennis circuit. Bullitt had been educated in England, came from one of Kentucky's oldest families, and had been an aide to Field Marshal Bernard Montgomery during World War II. The couple lived at Oxmoor Farm, near Louisville, Kentucky, which had been in the Bullitt family for ten generations. Stammers laid out and maintained an English garden and indulged her passion for racehorses. She helped run the annual steeplechases on the estate course in aid of a children's charity and, under the Oxmoor Charities Corporation, helped to plan schooling for event riders and summer concerts.

Stammers continued to be interested in tennis throughout her life and attended Wimbledon annually until her age made it impossible to travel. She died at her home in Louisville, Kentucky on 23 December 2005 and was buried in the family cemetery on 28 December 2005.

== Grand Slam tournament finals ==
=== Singles: (1 runner-up) ===
Result	Year	Championship	Surface	Opponent	Score
Loss	1939	Wimbledon Championships	Grass	(United States) Alice Marble	2–6, 0–6

=== Women's doubles: (3 titles, 1 runner-up) ===
Result	Year	Championship	Surface	Partner	Opponents	Score
Win	1935	French Championships	Clay	(United Kingdom) Margaret Scriven	(France) Ida Adamoff (Denmark) Hilde Krahwinkel Sperling	6–4, 6–0
Win	1935	Wimbledon Championships	Grass	(United Kingdom) Freda James	(France) Simonne Mathieu (Germany) Hilde Krahwinkel Sperling	6–1, 6–4
Win	1936	Wimbledon Championships	Grass	(United Kingdom) Freda James	(United States) Helen Jacobs (United States) Sarah Palfrey Fabyan	6–2, 6–1
Loss	1939	U. S. National Championships	Grass	(United Kingdom) Freda Hammersley	(United States) Sarah Palfrey Fabyan (United States) Alice Marble	5–7, 6–8

=== Mixed doubles: (1 runner-up) ===
Result	Year	Championship	Surface	Partner	Opponents	Score
Loss	1935	U. S. National Championships	Grass	(Czechoslovakia) Roderich Menzel	(United States) Sarah Palfrey Fabyan (Spain) Enrique Maier	4–6, 6–4, 3–6

== Grand Slam singles tournament timeline ==
Key
W	F	SF	QF	#R	RR	Q#	DNQ	A	NH

(W) winner; (F) finalist; (SF) semifinalist; (QF) quarterfinalist; (#R) rounds 4, 3, 2, 1; (RR) round-robin stage; (Q#) qualification round; (DNQ) did not qualify; (A) absent; (NH) not held; (SR) strike rate (events won / competed); (W–L) win–loss record.

Tournament	1931	1932	1933	1934	1935	1936	1937	1938	1939	1940	1941 – 1944	1945	1946^{1}	1947^{1}	Career SR
Australia	A	A	A	A	A	A	A	A	A	A	NH	NH	A	A	0 / 0
France	A	A	3R	QF	1R	A	A	A	A	NH	R	A	A	A	0 / 3
Wimbledon	2R	4R	4R	3R	QF	QF	4R	QF	F	NH	NH	NH	QF	QF	0 / 11
United States	A	A	A	QF	SF	SF	QF	QF	SF	A	A	A	3R	A	0 / 7
SR	0 / 1	0 / 1	0 / 2	0 / 3	0 / 3	0 / 2	0 / 2	0 / 2	0 / 2	0 / 0	0 / 0	0 / 0	0 / 2	0 / 1	0 / 21

R = tournament restricted to French nationals and held under German occupation.

^{1}In 1946 and 1947, the French Championships were held after Wimbledon.

== See also ==
- Performance timelines for all female tennis players since 1978 who reached at least one Grand Slam final
