= Ida Adamoff =

French tennis player

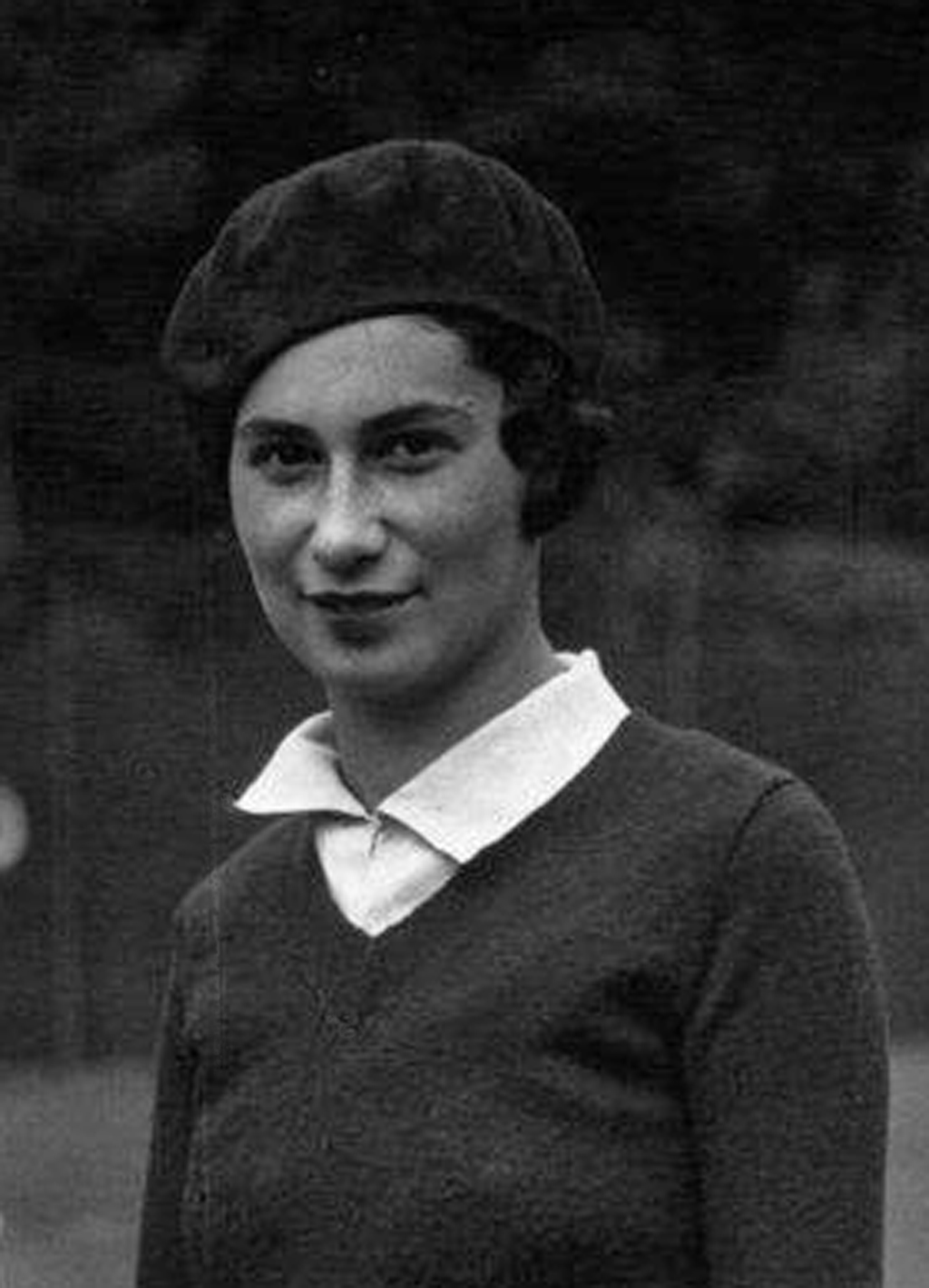
- Full name: Ida Vartanovna Adamiantz-Adamoff; Russian: Ида Вартановна Адамьянц-Адамова
- Country (sports): France
- Born: 26 June 1910 Moscow, Russian Empire
- Died: 5 June 1993 (aged 82) Paris, France

Singles
- Highest ranking: No. 13 (1931)(Zürich Sport))

Grand Slam singles results
- French Open: 3R (1929, 1931, 1932, 1935)
- Wimbledon: 3R (1934)

Grand Slam doubles results
- French Open: F (1935)
- Wimbledon: 1R (1931, 1934)

Grand Slam mixed doubles results
- French Open: 2R (1930)
- Wimbledon: QF (1931)

Ida Adamoff (Russian: Ида Адамова, IPA: [ˈidə ɐˈdaməvə]: 26 June [O.S. 13 June] 1910 – 5 June 1993) was a French tennis player active in the 1930s.

Adamoff reached the doubles final at the 1935 French Championships with Hilde Krahwinkel Sperling, losing to Margaret Scriven and Kay Stammers. Her best singles performance at a Grand Slam tournament was reaching the third round at the French Championships, in 1929, 1931, 1932 and 1935, and at the Wimbledon Championships in 1934. In 1931 she reached the quarterfinals of the mixed doubles event at Wimbledon with Enrique Maier.

In 1930 Adamoff won the singles title at the Championships of Spain and successfully defended her title in 1931. She defeated Cilly Aussem and Lucia Valerio at the Lenz Cup in Merano, Italy in October. In June 1931, she won the singles event at the Berlin Championships followed up in July with a victory at the Dutch Championships in Noordwijk where she beat Toni Schomburgk in the final. In 1932 she won the Romanian and Italian Championships singles titles. In July 1933, Adamoff won the doubles title at the Dutch Championships with Mrs. Burke.

In 1930, she was ranked no. 2 in France behind Simonne Mathieu.

She married Claude Bourdet in 1935 and had two sons and a daughter.

== Grand Slam finals ==
=== Doubles ===
Runners-up (1)

Result	Year	Championship	Partner	Opponents	Score
Loss	1935	French Championships	(Germany) Hilde Krahwinkel Sperling	(United Kingdom) Margaret Scriven (United Kingdom) Kay Stammers	4–6, 0–6
