= Lucia Valerio =

Italian tennis player (1905–1996)

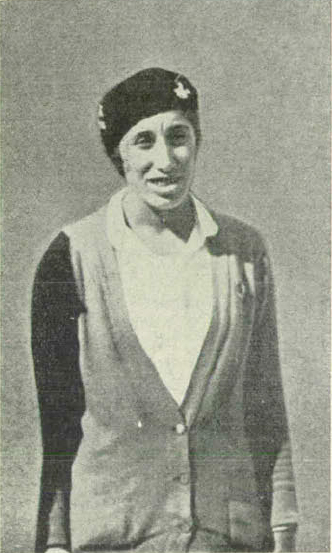
- Country (sports): Italy
- Born: 28 February 1905 Milan, Italy
- Died: 26 September 1996 (aged 91) Milan, Italy
- Retired: 1940
- Plays: Right-handed

Grand Slam singles results
- French Open: QF (1931, 1934, 1935)
- Wimbledon: QF (1933)

Grand Slam doubles results
- French Open: 3R (1932)
- Wimbledon: 3R (1933)

Grand Slam mixed doubles results
- French Open: 3R (1932, 1933, 1934)
- Wimbledon: QF (1935)

Lucia Valerio (Italian pronunciation: [luˈtʃiːa vaˈlɛːrjo]; 28 February 1905 – 26 September 1996) was an Italian female tennis player who was active from the late 1920s through 1940.

Valerio's father taught her to play tennis on the court at their home. Before settling on tennis, she practiced fencing, horse riding, and skiing. Her favorite strokes were forehand passing shots and her cut service.

From 1928 through 1938, she participated in seven Wimbledon Championships. Her best result in singles was the quarterfinals of the 1933 Wimbledon Championships where she lost to second-seeded Dorothy Round, the eventual runner-up. That same year, she partnered with Madzy Rollin Couquerque to reach the third round of the women's doubles competition. In the 1935 mixed doubles competition, she and partner Don Turnbull lost to the top-seeded pair of Hilde Krahwinkel Sperling and Gottfried Von Cramm in the quarterfinals.

In 1930, Valerio played against Phyllis Satterthwaite in the final of the Bordighera Championship on the Italian Riviera. Satterthwaite was a baseline player, and the game was based on safety and keeping the ball in play. Her determination not to make an error at the match point resulted in a rally lasting 450 strokes. Satterthwaite won that point and the match.

At the French International Championships, she reached the quarterfinals in 1931, 1934 (losing to Simonne Mathieu), and 1935. On her way to winning the 1935 title, Cilly Aussem defeated Valerio in straight sets.

In 1931, Valerio won the singles title at the Italian Championships in Milan, defeating Dorothy Andrus in the three-set final. She also won the mixed doubles title with Pat Hughes. She was the runner-up in singles at the inaugural 1930 Italian Championships and at the 1932, 1934, and 1935 editions.

Valerio was part of the Italian team that toured India in 1932, and, during that trip, she won the singles title at the East India Championships and Western India Championships.

== Tournament finals ==
=== Singles: 7 (2 titles, 5 runners-up) ===
Result	Year	Tournament	Opponent	Score
Loss	1930	Italian Championships	(Spain) Lilí Álvarez	6–3, 6–8, 0–6
Win	1930	Villa d'Este Championship	(France) Ida Adamoff	6–3, 6–4
Win	1931	Italian Championships	(United States) Dorothy Andrus	2–6, 6–2, 6–2
Loss	1931	Swiss International Championships	(Switzerland) Lolette Payot	4–6, 7–5, 3–6
Loss	1932	Italian Championships	(France) Ida Adamoff	4–6, 5–7
Loss	1934	Italian Championships	(United States) Helen Jacobs	3–6, 0–6
Loss	1935	Italian Championships	(Denmark) Hilde Krahwinkel Sperling	4–6, 1–6
