= Simonne Mathieu =

French tennis player (1908–1980)

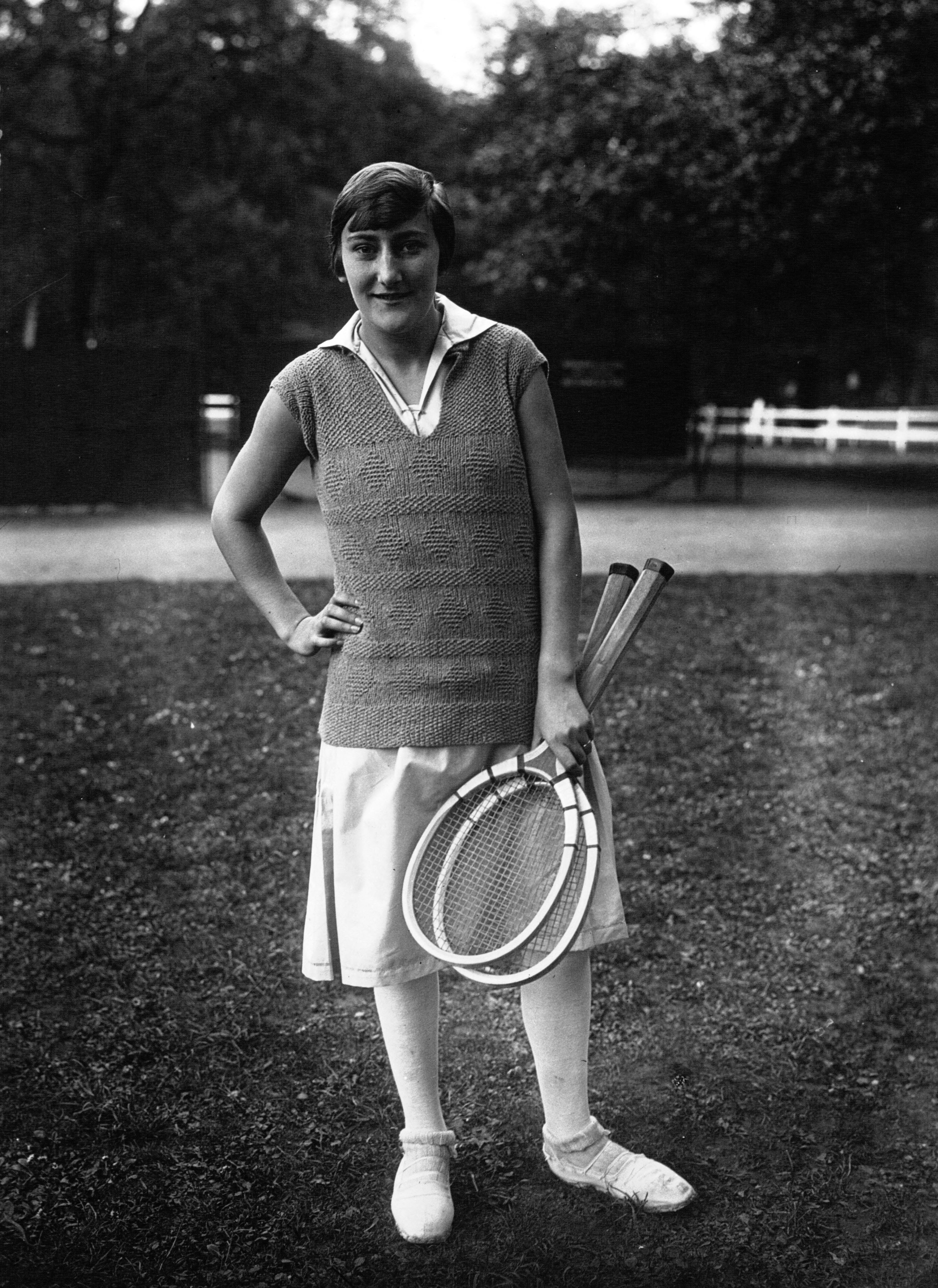
- Full name: Simonne Emma Henriette Passemard-Mathieu
- Country (sports): France
- Born: 31 January 1908 Neuilly-sur-Seine, Hauts-de-Seine, France
- Died: 7 January 1980 (aged 71) Chatou, France
- Plays: Right–handed (one-handed backhand)
- Int. Tennis HoF: 2006 (member page)

Singles
- Career record: 510-94 (84.4%)
- Career titles: 147
- Highest ranking: No. 3 (1932, A. Wallis Myers)

Grand Slam singles results
- French Open: W (1938, 1939)
- Wimbledon: SF (1930, 1931, 1932, 1934, 1936, 1937)
- US Open: QF (1938)

Doubles

Grand Slam doubles results
- French Open: W (1933, 1934, 1936, 1937, 1938, 1939)
- Wimbledon: W (1933, 1934, 1937)
- US Open: F (1938)

Grand Slam mixed doubles results
- French Open: W (1937, 1938)
- Wimbledon: F (1937)

Simonne Mathieu (Note: Also spelled "Simone" in several sources.) (French pronunciation: [simɔn matjø] née Passemard;) (31 January 1908 – 7 January 1980) was a tennis player from France, born in Neuilly-sur-Seine, Hauts-de-Seine, who was active in the 1930s. She won the French Championships singles title in 1938 and 1939.

During World War II, she created and led the Corps of French Volunteers in the Free French Forces, the first female unit in the military history of France.

== Tennis career ==
Mathieu is best remembered for winning two major singles titles at the French Championships (in 1938 and 1939), and for reaching the final of that tournament an additional six times, in 1929, 1932, 1933, 1935, 1936, and 1937. In those finals, she lost three times to Hilde Krahwinkel Sperling, twice to Helen Wills Moody, and once to Margaret Scriven.

Mathieu won 11 Grand Slam doubles championships: three women's doubles titles at Wimbledon (1933–34, 1937), six women's doubles titles at the French Championships (1933–34, 1936–39), and two mixed-doubles titles at the French Championships (1937–38). She completed the rare triple at the French Championships in 1938, winning the singles, women's doubles, and mixed-doubles titles.

Mathieu's 13 Grand Slam titles are second only to Suzanne Lenglen's 21 among French women.

According to A. Wallis Myers and John Olliff of The Daily Telegraph and the Daily Mail respectively, Mathieu was ranked in the world top 10 from 1929 through 1939 (no rankings were issued from 1940 through 1945), reaching a career high of world No. 3 in 1932.

The winners' trophy of the women's doubles event at the French Open is named in her honour as the Coupe Simonne-Mathieu.

== World War II ==
During World War II, Captain Mathieu was founder of the Corps Féminin Français, the women's volunteer branch of the Free French Forces, similar to the British Auxiliary Territorial Service. Mathieu was succeeded in that position by Captain Hélène Terré. For their service, each woman was named an Officer of the Legion of Honour.

== Honours ==
She was inducted into the International Tennis Hall of Fame in 2006.

In November 2017, the French Tennis Federation (FFT) announced that the third show-court at Roland Garros will be named Court Simonne-Mathieu in her honor.

== Grand Slam finals ==
=== Singles: 8 (2 titles, 6 runner-ups) ===
Result	Year	Championship	Surface	Opponent	Score
Loss	1929	French Championships	Clay	(United States) Helen Wills	3–6, 4–6
Loss	1932	French Championships	Clay	(United States) Helen Wills	5–7, 1–6
Loss	1933	French Championships	Clay	(United Kingdom) Margaret Scriven	2–6, 6–4, 4–6
Loss	1935	French Championships	Clay	(Nazi Germany) Hilde Krahwinkel	2–6, 1–6
Loss	1936	French Championships	Clay	(Nazi Germany) Hilde Krahwinkel	3–6, 4–6
Loss	1937	French Championships	Clay	(Nazi Germany) Hilde Krahwinkel	2–6, 4–6
Win	1938	French Championships	Clay	(France) Nelly Landry	6–0, 6–3
Win	1939	French Championships	Clay	(Second Polish Republic) Jadwiga Jędrzejowska	6–3, 8–6

=== Doubles: 13 (9 titles, 4 runner-ups) ===
Result	Year	Championship	Surface	Partner	Opponents	Score
Loss	1930	French Championships	Clay	(France) Simone Barbier	(United States) Elizabeth Ryan (United States) Helen Wills	3–6, 1–6
Win	1933	French Championships	Clay	(United States) Elizabeth Ryan	(France) Sylvie Jung Henrotin (France) Colette Rosambert	6–1, 6–3
Win	1933	Wimbledon Championships	Grass	(United States) Elizabeth Ryan	(United Kingdom) Freda James (United Kingdom) Billie Yorke	6–2, 9–11, 6–4
Win	1934	French Championships	Clay	(United States) Elizabeth Ryan	(United States) Helen Jacobs (United States) Sarah Palfrey	3–6, 6–4, 6–2
Win	1934	Wimbledon Championships	Grass	(United States) Elizabeth Ryan	(United States) Dorothy Andrus (France) Sylvie Jung Henrotin	6–3, 6–3
Loss	1935	Wimbledon Championships	Grass	(Germany) Hilde Krahwinkel	(United Kingdom) Freda James (United Kingdom) Kay Stammers	1–6, 4–6
Win	1936	French Championships	Clay	(United Kingdom) Billie Yorke	(Poland) Jadwiga Jędrzejowska (United Kingdom) Susan Noel	2–6, 6–4, 6–4
Win	1937	French Championships	Clay	(United Kingdom) Billie Yorke	(United States) Dorothy Andrus (France) Sylvie Jung Henrotin	3–6, 6–2, 6–2
Win	1937	Wimbledon Championships	Grass	(United Kingdom) Billie Yorke	(United Kingdom) Phyllis King (United Kingdom) Elsie Goldsack	6–3, 6–3
Win	1938	French Championships	Clay	(United Kingdom) Billie Yorke	(France) Nelly Adamson (France) Arlette Halff	6–3, 6–3
Loss	1938	Wimbledon Championships	Grass	(United Kingdom) Billie Yorke	(United States) Sarah Palfrey (United States) Alice Marble	2–6, 3–6
Loss	1938	US Championships	Grass	(Poland) Jadwiga Jędrzejowska	(United States) Sarah Palfrey (United States) Alice Marble	8–6, 4–6, 3–6
Win	1939	French Championships	Clay	(Poland) Jadwiga Jędrzejowska	(Kingdom of Yugoslavia) Alice Florian (Kingdom of Yugoslavia) Hella Kovac	7–5, 7–5

=== Mixed doubles: 4 (2 titles, 2 runner-ups) ===
Result	Year	Championship	Surface	Partner	Opponents	Score
Win	1937	French Championships	Clay	(France) Yvon Petra	(Germany) Marie-Luise Horn (France) Roland Journu	7–5, 7–5
Loss	1937	Wimbledon Championships	Grass	(France) Yvon Petra	(United States) Alice Marble (United States) Don Budge	1–6, 4–6
Win	1938	French Championships	Clay	(Kingdom of Yugoslavia) Dragutin Mitić	(Australia) Nancye Wynne Bolton (France) Christian Boussus	2–6, 6–3, 6–4
Loss	1939	French Championships	Clay	(Kingdom of Yugoslavia) Franjo Kukuljević	(United States) Sarah Palfrey (United States) Elwood Cooke	6–4, 1–6, 5–7

== Grand Slam singles performance timeline ==
Key
W	F	SF	QF	#R	RR	Q#	DNQ	A	NH

(W) winner; (F) finalist; (SF) semifinalist; (QF) quarterfinalist; (#R) rounds 4, 3, 2, 1; (RR) round-robin stage; (Q#) qualification round; (DNQ) did not qualify; (A) absent; (NH) not held; (SR) strike rate (events won / competed); (W–L) win–loss record.

Tournament	1925	1926	1927	1928	1929	1930	1931	1932	1933	1934	1935	1936	1937	1938	1939	1940	1941 – 1944	1945	1946^{1}	Career SR
Australian Open	A	A	A	A	A	A	A	A	A	A	A	A	A	A	A	A	NH	NH	A	0 / 0
French Championships	QF	QF	3R	A	F	QF	QF	F	F	SF	F	F	F	W	W	NH	R	A	A	2 / 14
Wimbledon	A	1R	2R	A	3R	SF	SF	SF	QF	SF	QF	SF	SF	QF	QF	NH	NH	NH	1R	0 / 14
US Championships	A	A	A	A	A	A	A	A	A	A	A	A	A	QF	1R	A	A	A	A	0 / 2
SR	0 / 1	0 / 2	0 / 2	0 / 0	0 / 2	0 / 2	0 / 2	0 / 2	0 / 2	0 / 2	0 / 2	0 / 2	0 / 2	1 / 3	1 / 3	0 / 0	0 / 0	0 / 0	0 / 1	2 / 30

R = tournament restricted to French nationals and held under German occupation.

^{1}In 1946, the French Championships were held after Wimbledon.

== See also ==
- Performance timelines for all female tennis players since 1978 who reached at least one Grand Slam final
