= Lolette Payot =

Swiss-French tennis player

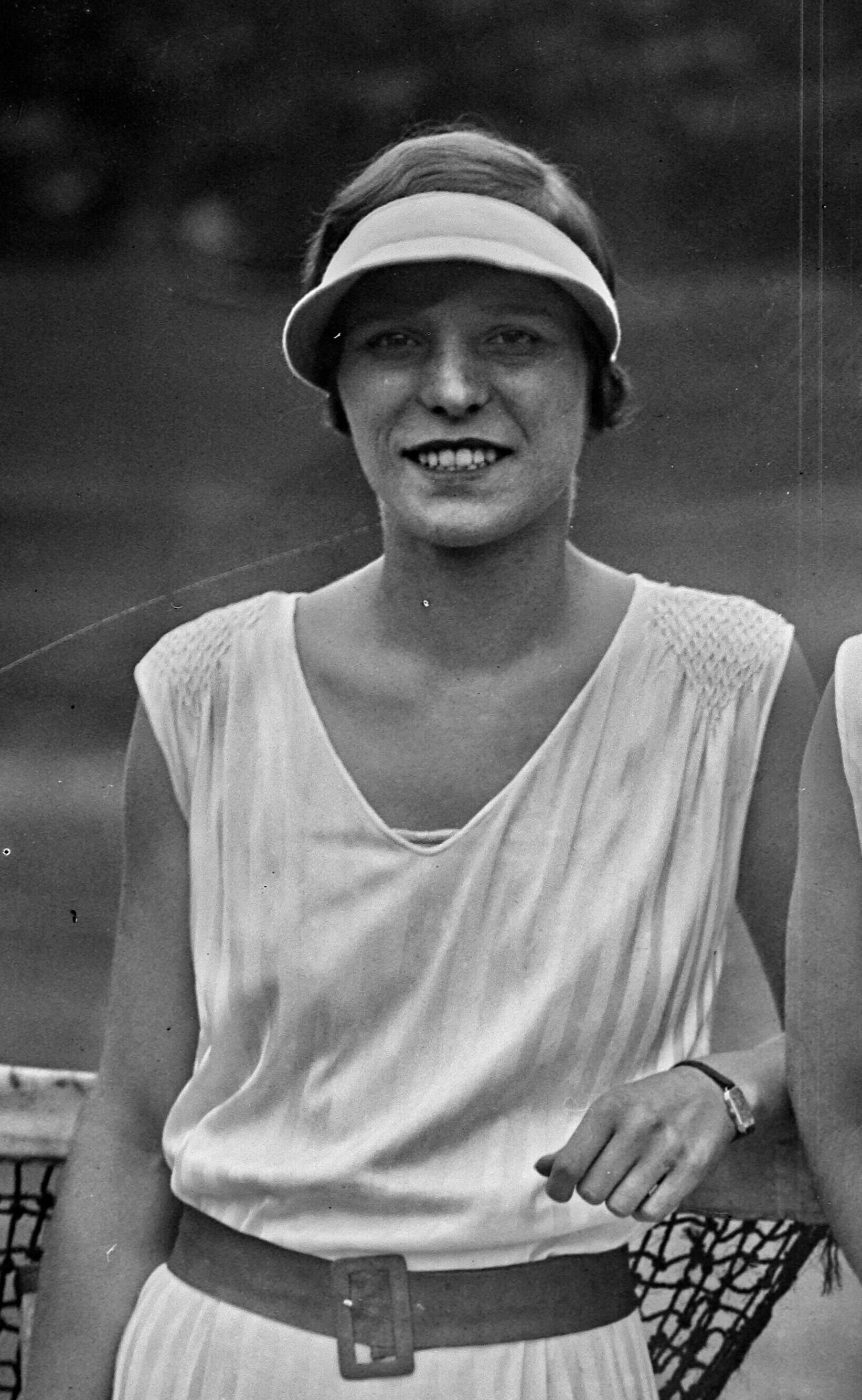
- Lolette Payot (1929)
- Full name: Lolette Payot-Dodille
- Country (sports): Switzerland; France (since 1937)
- Born: 17 April 1910 Lausanne, Switzerland
- Died: February 1988 (aged 77)

Singles
- Career record: 225–66 (77.3%)
- Career titles: 71
- Highest ranking: No. 4 (1932, A. Wallis Myers)

Grand Slam singles results
- French Open: QF (1932, 1934, 1935)
- Wimbledon: QF (1931, 1933, 1934)

Grand Slam doubles results
- French Open: SF (1933)
- Wimbledon: SF (1932, 1934)

Grand Slam mixed doubles results
- French Open: W (1935)
- Wimbledon: 3R (1930, 1933)

Lolette Payot-Dodille (English: /pɑːˈjoʊ/ pah-YOH, French: [lɔlɛt pajo]; 17 April 1910 – February 1988) was a Swiss-French tennis player.

== Biography ==
Payot was born on 17 April 1910 at Lausanne. She learned to play tennis age 8 on the courts of the Montchoisi tennis club. At the age of 13, she won the Swiss national championships for the first time.

Payot competed at the Wimbledon Championships from 1929 to 1935, reaching the singles quarterfinals in 1931, 1933 and 1934. At the French Championships, she reached the quarterfinals in 1932, 1934 and 1935. In 1935, she won the mixed doubles title partnering Marcel Bernard at Paris. She was ranked world number 4 by A. Wallis Myers in 1932.

In August 1932 she won the singles title at the German Championships in Hamburg after a three-sets victory in the final against Hilde Krahwinkel.

Payot won the Swiss national championships seven times in a row from 1929 to 1935. During the Swiss championships in July 1935, Payot fell seriously ill. It took her a year to recover, and she decided to retire from the amateur tennis circuit. She then opened a tennis school and worked as a coach at Montchoisi. In January 1937, she married French Robert Dodille at Lausanne and took French citizenship.

By 1943, Payot had begun to play tournaments again. In August 1945, she won the singles title at the French championships. The title, however, isn't recognized by the Fédération Française de Tennis and the International Tennis Federation.

Payot continued to work as a coach and as a secretary at Montchoisi tennis club until 1982. She died at the age of 77 in February 1988.

== Tournament titles ==
=== Doubles ===
Result	Year	Championship	Surface	Partner	Opponents	Score
Win	1932	Italian Championships	Clay	(France) Colette Rosambert	(United States) Dorothy Andrus (Italy) Lucia Valerio	7–5, 6–3

=== Mixed doubles ===
Result	Year	Championship	Surface	Partner	Opponents	Score
Win	1935	French Championships	Clay	(France) Marcel Bernard	(France) Sylvie Jung Henrotin (France) André Martin-Legeay	4–6, 6–2, 6–4
