= Hilde Krahwinkel Sperling =

German-Danish tennis player

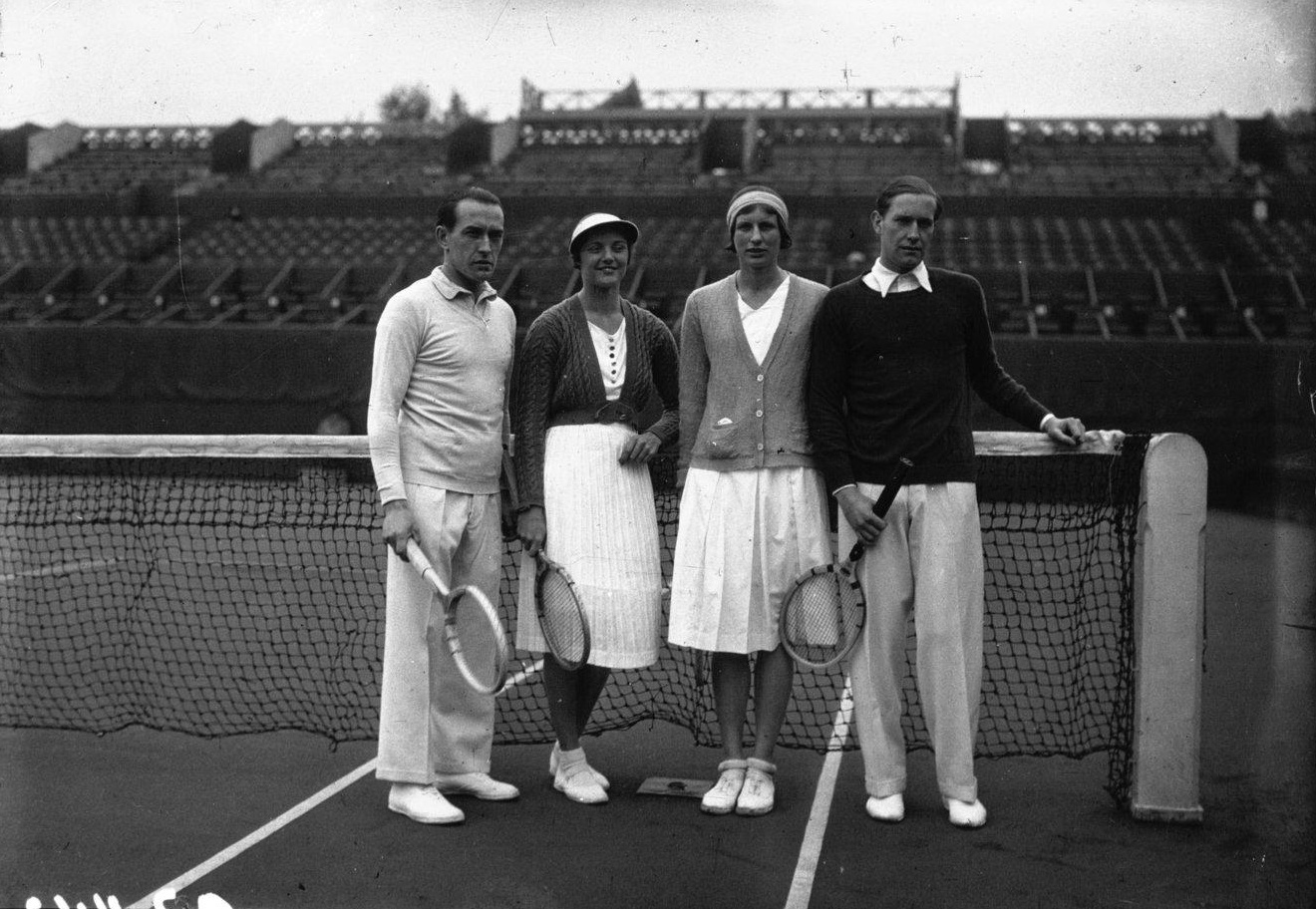
- Henri Cochet, Eileen Bennett Whittingstall, Hilde Krahwinkel and Gottfried von Cramm, Roland Garros 1932
- Country (sports): Germany; Denmark
- Born: 26 March 1908 Essen, Germany
- Died: 7 March 1981 (aged 72) Helsingborg, Sweden
- Plays: Right-handed
- Int. Tennis HoF: 2013 (member page)

Singles
- Career record: 331-41 (89.0%)
- Career titles: 90
- Highest ranking: No. 1 (1936, Ned Potter)

Grand Slam singles results
- French Open: W (1935, 1936, 1937)
- Wimbledon: F (1931, 1936)

Doubles

Grand Slam doubles results
- French Open: F (1935)
- Wimbledon: F (1935)

Grand Slam mixed doubles results
- French Open: 2R (1929, 1930)
- Wimbledon: W (1933)

Hildegard Krahwinkel Sperling (née Krahwinkel; 26 March 1908 – 7 March 1981) was a German-Danish tennis player. She won three consecutive singles titles at the French Championships from 1935 to 1937. Krahwinkel Sperling is generally regarded as the second-greatest female German tennis player in history, behind Steffi Graf. Sperling played a counterpunching game, predicated on speed, and wore down opponents. Helen Jacobs once wrote that Sperling was the third-best player she ever played, behind Helen Wills Moody and Suzanne Lenglen.

She became a dual-citizen after marrying a Dane, Svend Sperling, in December 1933. (Note: After the marriage she represented Denmark, according to the Danish tennis federation in 2015, but to others, including the French Championships and Tennis Hall of Fame there was never a mid-career switch and she remained a German athlete. She declared in January 1934, shortly after her marriage, that she would be representing Denmark and had become a member of the Hellerup Idrætsklub.)

== Career ==
According to A. Wallis Myers and John Olliff of The Daily Telegraph and the Daily Mail, Sperling was ranked in the world top 10 from 1930 through 1939 (no rankings issued from 1940 through 1945), reaching a career high of world no. 2 in these rankings in 1936. However, according to Ned Potter of American Lawn Tennis, Sperling was the top-ranked player for 1936.

From 1935 through 1937, Sperling won three consecutive singles titles at the French Championships. She is one of only five women in history to do so. The others are Moody (1928–1930), Monica Seles (1990–1992), Justine Henin (2005–2007) and Iga Świątek (2022–2024).

Sperling's only loss on a clay court from 1935 through 1939 was to Simonne Mathieu at a tournament in Beaulieu, France in 1937. The score was 7–5, 6–1, and the two sets took 2 hours and 45 minutes to play. Two games lasted an hour. It was Mathieu's only victory versus Sperling in over 20 career matches.

Sperling twice reached the singles final at Wimbledon but never won the title. In 1931, she lost to her compatriot Cilly Aussem. In 1936, she lost to Jacobs. However, Sperling won the mixed doubles title that year, playing with Gottfried von Cramm.

From 1933 through 1939, Sperling won the singles title at the German Championships six consecutive times (the tournament was not held in 1936 because of the Berlin Olympics). This record stood for five decades until Graf won the tournament nine times (but not more than four consecutively). Sperling also won the singles title at the Italian Championships in 1935 and defeated Moody in the semifinals of the 1938 Queens Club London championships, just before Moody won her eighth Wimbledon singles title. Sperling's last international singles title was at the 1950 Scandinavian Covered Courts Championships in Copenhagen, Denmark when she was age 41. Sperling won several championships in Denmark while that country was occupied by Germany during World War II. Sperling never entered the U.S. Championships because of scheduling conflicts with the German Championships.

In recognition of her winning the French Championships three times, being a Wimbledon finalist twice, reaching the semifinals of the French Championships and Wimbledon an additional six times, and being ranked in the top 10 for 10 consecutive years, Sperling was inducted into the International Tennis Hall of Fame in 2013.

== Grand Slam finals ==
=== Singles (3 titles, 2 runners-up) ===
Result	Year	Championship	Surface	Opponent	Score
Loss	1931	Wimbledon	Grass	(Germany) Cilly Aussem	2–6, 5–7
Win	1935	French Championships	Clay	(France) Simonne Mathieu	6–2, 6–1
Win	1936	French Championships (2)	Clay	(France) Simonne Mathieu	6–3, 6–4
Loss	1936	Wimbledon	Grass	(United States) Helen Jacobs	2–6, 6–4, 5–7
Win	1937	French Championships (3)	Clay	(France) Simonne Mathieu	6–2, 6–4

=== Doubles (0 titles, 2 runners-up) ===
Result	Year	Championship	Surface	Partner	Opponents	Score
Loss	1935	French Championships	Clay	(United Kingdom) Margaret Scriven	(France) Ida Adamoff (United Kingdom) Kay Stammers	4–6, 0–6
Loss	1935	Wimbledon	Grass	(United Kingdom) Freda James Hammersley	(France) Simonne Mathieu (United Kingdom) Kay Stammers	1–6, 4–6

=== Mixed doubles (1 title, 1 runner-up) ===
Result	Year	Championship	Surface	Partner	Opponents	Score
Loss	1930	Wimbledon	Grass	(Germany) Daniel Prenn	(United States) Elizabeth Ryan (Australia) Jack Crawford	1–6, 3–6
Win	1933	Wimbledon	Grass	(Germany) Gottfried von Cramm	(United Kingdom) Mary Heeley (South Africa) Norman Farquharson	7–5, 8–6

== Grand Slam singles tournament timeline ==
Key
W	F	SF	QF	#R	RR	Q#	DNQ	A	NH

(W) winner; (F) finalist; (SF) semifinalist; (QF) quarterfinalist; (#R) rounds 4, 3, 2, 1; (RR) round-robin stage; (Q#) qualification round; (DNQ) did not qualify; (A) absent; (NH) not held; (SR) strike rate (events won / competed); (W–L) win–loss record.

Tournament	1929	1930	1931	1932	1933	1934	1935	1936	1937	1938	1939	Career SR
Australian Championships	A	A	A	A	A	A	A	A	A	A	A	0 / 0
French Championships	2R	3R	SF	SF	2R	A	W	W	W	A	A	3 / 8
Wimbledon	A	2R	F	QF	SF	4R	SF	F	QF	SF	SF	0 / 10
U.S. Championships	A	A	A	A	A	A	A	A	A	A	A	0 / 0
SR	0 / 1	0 / 2	0 / 2	0 / 2	0 / 2	0 / 1	1 / 2	1 / 2	1 / 2	0 / 1	0 / 1	3 / 18

== See also ==
- List of female tennis players
- Grand Slam women's singles champions
- Performance timelines for all female tennis players since 1978 who reached at least one Grand Slam final
