= Colette Rosambert =

French tennis player

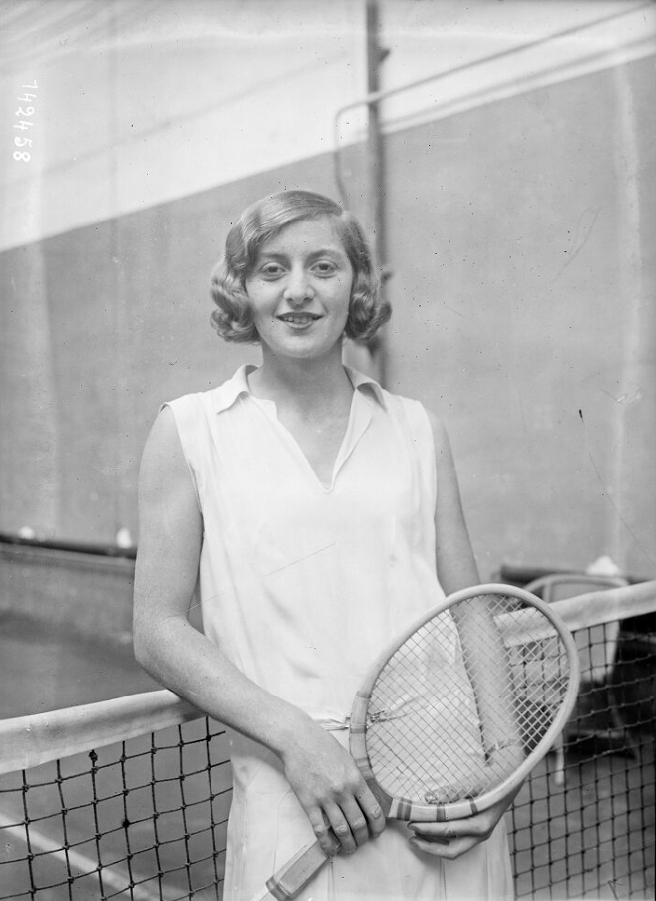
- Rosambert in 1929
- Full name: Colette Rosambert-Boegner
- Country (sports): France
- Born: 10 December 1910 Paris, France
- Died: 17 April 1987 (aged 76) Paris, France

Singles

Grand Slam singles results
- French Open: 3R (1933, 1934, 1937, 1948)
- Wimbledon: 3R (1946–49)

Doubles

Grand Slam doubles results
- French Open: F (1933)
- Wimbledon: QF (1948)

Grand Slam mixed doubles results
- French Open: W (1934)
- Wimbledon: QF (1937)

Colette Rosambert-Boegner (French pronunciation: [kɔ.lɛt rozamˈbɛʁ]; née Rosenberg; 10 December 1910 – 17 April 1987) was a French tennis player.

Rosambert was the daughter of Polish Jewish emigrant Willy Rosenberg from Gdańsk and American Madeleine Sinauer, born in New York to protestant German immigrants.

Rosambert learnt to play tennis from the professional Albert Burke in Deauville.

She notably reached the final of the women's doubles at the French Open in 1933, with her compatriot Sylvie Jung Henrotin. The following year, she won the mixed-doubles tournament there, with Jean Borotra. She won the All England Plate in 1933, a tennis competition held at the Wimbledon Championships which consisted of players who were defeated in the first or second rounds of the singles competition.

In 1934, she won the singles title at the French Covered Court Championships.

She was married to journalist Philippe Boegner, son of Marc Boegner.

== Grand Slam finals ==
=== Doubles ===
Result	Year	Championship	Surface	Partner	Opponents	Score
Loss	1933	French Championships	Clay	(France) Sylvie Jung Henrotin	(France) Simonne Mathieu (United States) Elizabeth Ryan	1–6, 3–6

=== Mixed doubles ===
Result	Year	Championship	Surface	Partner	Opponents	Score
Win	1934	French Championships	Clay	(France) Jean Borotra	(United States) Elizabeth Ryan (Australia) Adrian Quist	6–2, 6–4
