= 1936 Wimbledon Championships – Women's doubles =

Women's doubles
- 1936 Wimbledon Championships

Final
- Champions: (United Kingdom) Freda James (United Kingdom) Kay Stammers
- Runners-up: (United States) Sarah Fabyan (United States) Helen Jacobs
- Score: 6–2, 6–1

Details
- Draw: 48 (5Q)
- Seeds: 4

Events
Singles	men	women		boys	girls
Doubles	men	women	mixed	boys	girls
- Wimbledon Championships

Freda James and Kay Stammers successfully defended their title, defeating Sarah Fabyan and Helen Jacobs in the final, 6–2, 6–1 to win the ladies' doubles tennis title at the 1936 Wimbledon Championships.

== Seeds ==
1. (United Kingdom) Freda James / (United Kingdom) Kay Stammers (champions)
2. (United States) Sarah Fabyan / (United States) Helen Jacobs (final)
3. (France) Simonne Mathieu / (United Kingdom) Billie Yorke (quarterfinals)
4. (Poland) Jadwiga Jędrzejowska / (United Kingdom) Susan Noel (quarterfinals)

Click on the seed number of a player to go to their draw section.

== Draw ==
Key

- Q = Qualifier
- WC = Wild card
- LL = Lucky loser
- Alt = Alternate
- ITF = ITF entry
- PR = Protected ranking
- SR = Special ranking
- SE = Special exempt
- JE = Junior exempt
- JR = Junior Accelerator Programme entrant
- CO = College Accelerator Programme entrant
- NG = Next Gen Accelerator Program entrant
- w/o = Walkover
- r = Retired
- d = Defaulted

=== Finals ===
Quarterfinals
2	(United States) Sarah Fabyan (United States) Helen Jacobs	6	6
(United Kingdom) Sonia Mavrogordato (United Kingdom) Madie Moss	2	2
4	(Poland) Jadwiga Jędrzejowska (United Kingdom) Susan Noel	5	6	3
(United Kingdom) Joan Ingram (United Kingdom) Phyllis King	7	3	6
(United States) Dorothy Andrus (France) Sylvie Henrotin	7	6
3	(France) Simonne Mathieu (United Kingdom) Billie Yorke	5	2
(France) Edith Belliard (France) Jacqueline Goldschmidt	3	4
1	(United Kingdom) Freda James (United Kingdom) Kay Stammers	6	6

Semifinals
2	(United States) Sarah Fabyan (United States) Helen Jacobs	6	6
(United Kingdom) Joan Ingram (United Kingdom) Phyllis King	4	3
(United States) Dorothy Andrus (France) Sylvie Henrotin	0	4
1	(United Kingdom) Freda James (United Kingdom) Kay Stammers	6	6

Final
2	(United States) Sarah Fabyan (United States) Helen Jacobs	2	1
1	(United Kingdom) Freda James (United Kingdom) Kay Stammers	6	6

=== Top half ===
==== Section 1 ====
First round

Second round
2	(United States) Sarah Fabyan (United States) Helen Jacobs	6	6
(United Kingdom) Elsie Pittman (United Kingdom) Mary Whitmarsh	0	2
(Netherlands) Madzy Couquerque (Netherlands) Truid Terwindt	6	7
(United Kingdom) Joan Marquis (United Kingdom) Mona Riddell	1	5
Q	Clara Black (United Kingdom) Lady Rowallan	4	1
(United Kingdom) Sonia Mavrogordato (United Kingdom) Madie Moss	6	6
(United Kingdom) Helen Burr (United Kingdom) Yvonne Law	w/o
Q	Mrs GL Baker; Mrs EA Kemp

Third round
2	(United States) S Fabyan (United States) H Jacobs	6	7
(Netherlands) M Couquerque (Netherlands) G Terwindt	2	5
(United Kingdom) S Mavrogordato (United Kingdom) M Moss	6	6
Q	Mrs GL Baker; Mrs EA Kemp	0	2

Quarterfinals
2	(United States) S Fabyan (United States) H Jacobs	6	6
(United Kingdom) S Mavrogordato (United Kingdom) M Moss	2	2

The nationalities of Mrs Clara Black, Mrs GL Baker and Mrs EA Kemp are unknown.

==== Section 2 ====
First round
4	(Poland) Jadwiga Jędrzejowska (United Kingdom) Susan Noel	6	8
(Germany) Marie Horn (Chile) Anita Lizana	3	6
(United Kingdom) Elsa Haylock (United Kingdom) Ruth Kirk	6	6
(United Kingdom) Jeanette Morfey (United Kingdom) Sheila Paterson	1	2
Q	(United Kingdom) Lucy Pennycuick (United Kingdom) Mie Trentham	0	5
(United Kingdom) Nancy Dickin (United Kingdom) Patsy O'Connell	6	7
(United Kingdom) Betty Hobson (United Kingdom) Audrey Wright	7	6	6
(United Kingdom) Cecily Marriott (United Kingdom) Madge Slaney	9	3	3
(United Kingdom) Joan Ingram (United Kingdom) Phyllis King	6	6
(United Kingdom) Joy Cunningham (United Kingdom) Joan Strawson	0	2
(United Kingdom) Dora Beazley (United Kingdom) Molly Hargreaves	4	6
(United Kingdom) Nancy Fontes (United Kingdom) Rosemary Smith	6	8
(United Kingdom) Gladys Clarke-Jervoise (United Kingdom) Mildred Freeman	3	8
(United Kingdom) Mary Heeley (United Kingdom) Dorothy Round	6	10
(United Kingdom) Nina Brown (United Kingdom) Rita Jarvis	4	4
(United Kingdom) Evelyn Dearman (United Kingdom) Nancy Lyle	6	6

Second round
4	(Poland) J Jędrzejowska (United Kingdom) S Noel	6	8
(United Kingdom) E Haylock (United Kingdom) R Kirk	1	6
(United Kingdom) N Dickin (United Kingdom) P O'Connell	1	6	3
(United Kingdom) B Hobson (United Kingdom) A Wright	6	4	6
(United Kingdom) J Ingram (United Kingdom) P King	7	6
(United Kingdom) N Fontes (United Kingdom) R Smith	5	3
(United Kingdom) M Heeley (United Kingdom) D Round	7	2	6
(United Kingdom) E Dearman (United Kingdom) N Lyle	5	6	2

Third round
4	(Poland) J Jędrzejowska (United Kingdom) S Noel	6	6
(United Kingdom) B Hobson (United Kingdom) A Wright	2	1
(United Kingdom) J Ingram (United Kingdom) P King	6	6
(United Kingdom) M Heeley (United Kingdom) D Round	1	4

Quarterfinals
4	(Poland) J Jędrzejowska (United Kingdom) S Noel	5	6	3
(United Kingdom) J Ingram (United Kingdom) P King	7	3	6

=== Bottom half ===
==== Section 3 ====
First round
(United Kingdom) Mary Hardwick (United Kingdom) Ermyntrude Harvey	6	3	6
(United Kingdom) Mrs CTC Ennals (United Kingdom) Betty Uber	1	6	2
(Belgium) Nelly Adamson (Belgium) Josane de Meulemeester	6	6
(United Kingdom) Madge List (United Kingdom) Gladys Southwell	2	4
(United Kingdom) Mary Bowden (United Kingdom) Joan O'Meara	6	3
(United States) Dorothy Andrus (France) Sylvie Henrotin	8	6
(United Kingdom) Sylvia Mayne (United Kingdom) Christabel Wheatcroft	2	4
Q	M Parr; WE Sargeant	6	6
(United Kingdom) Alex McOstrich (United Kingdom) Jean Saunders	1	7	6
(Republic of Ireland) Norma Stoker (Republic of Ireland) Hilda Wallis	6	5	3
(South Africa) Audrey Allister (United Kingdom) Betty Nuthall	6	3	6
(United States) Carolin Babcock (United States) Marjorie Van Ryn	4	6	3
(United Kingdom) Gaby Curtis (United Kingdom) Andree Lucas	6	7
(Hungary) Magda Baumgarten (Austria) Rosl Kraus	3	5
Q	(United Kingdom) Phyllis Grover (United Kingdom) Gladys Osborne	3	2
3	(France) Simonne Mathieu (United Kingdom) Billie Yorke	6	6

Second round
(United Kingdom) M Hardwick (United Kingdom) E Harvey	7	6
(Belgium) N Adamson (Belgium) J de Meulemeester	5	4
(United States) D Andrus (France) S Henrotin	6	6
Q	M Parr; WE Sargeant	2	1
(United Kingdom) A McOstrich (United Kingdom) J Saunders	9	6
(South Africa) A Allister (United Kingdom) B Nuthall	7	2
(United Kingdom) G Curtis (United Kingdom) A Lucas	3	6
3	(France) S Mathieu (United Kingdom) A Yorke	6	8

Third round
(United Kingdom) M Hardwick (United Kingdom) E Harvey	6	2	3
(United States) D Andrus (France) S Henrotin	3	6	6
(United Kingdom) A McOstrich (United Kingdom) J Saunders	1	2
3	(France) S Mathieu (United Kingdom) A Yorke	6	6

Quarterfinals
(United States) D Andrus (France) S Henrotin	7	6
3	(France) S Mathieu (United Kingdom) A Yorke	5	2

The nationalities of M Parr and WE Sargeant are unknown.

==== Section 4 ====
First round

Second round
(France) Edith Belliard (France) Jacqueline Goldschmidt	4	6	6
(United Kingdom) Margaret Mellows (United Kingdom) CJ Tyrrell	6	2	2
(United Kingdom) Valerie Scott (Greece) Phyllis Xydis	6	6	6
(United Kingdom) Sheila Chuter (United Kingdom) Penny Weekes	0	8	8
(United Kingdom) Mary Burrows (United Kingdom) Edie Rudd	3	6	3
(United Kingdom) Betty Couper (United Kingdom) Joy Mowbray-Green	6	3	6
(United Kingdom) Gethyn Harry (United Kingdom) Effie Peters	1	2
1	(United Kingdom) Freda James (United Kingdom) Kay Stammers	6	6

Third round
(France) E Belliard (France) J Goldschmidt	3	6	6
(United Kingdom) S Chuter (United Kingdom) P Weekes	6	1	0
(United Kingdom) B Couper (United Kingdom) J Mowbray-Green	2	6	3
1	(United Kingdom) W James (United Kingdom) K Stammers	6	1	6

Quarterfinals
(France) E Belliard (France) J Goldschmidt	3	4
(United Kingdom) W James (United Kingdom) K Stammers	6	6
