= 1934 Wimbledon Championships – Women's doubles =

Women's doubles
- 1934 Wimbledon Championships

Final
- Champions: (France) Simonne Mathieu (United States) Elizabeth Ryan
- Runners-up: (United States) Dorothy Andrus (France) Sylvie Henrotin
- Score: 6–3, 6–3

Details
- Draw: 48 (5Q)
- Seeds: 4

Events
| Singles | men | women | | boys | girls |
| Doubles | men | women | mixed | boys | girls |
- Wimbledon Championships

Simonne Mathieu and Elizabeth Ryan successfully defended their title, defeating Dorothy Andrus and Sylvie Henrotin in the final, 6–3, 6–3 to win the ladies' doubles tennis title at the 1934 Wimbledon Championships.

== Seeds ==
1. (France) Simonne Mathieu / (United States) Elizabeth Ryan (champions)
2. (United States) Helen Jacobs / (United States) Sarah Palfrey (quarterfinals)
3. (United Kingdom) Freda James / (United States) Betty Nuthall (third round)
4. (United Kingdom) Evelyn Dearman / (Belgium) Nancy Lyle (quarterfinals)

Click on the seed number of a player to go to their draw section.

== Draw ==
Key

- Q = Qualifier
- WC = Wild card
- LL = Lucky loser
- Alt = Alternate
- ITF = ITF entry
- PR = Protected ranking
- SR = Special ranking
- SE = Special exempt
- JE = Junior exempt
- JR = Junior Accelerator Programme entrant
- CO = College Accelerator Programme entrant
- NG = Next Gen Accelerator Program entrant
- w/o = Walkover
- r = Retired
- d = Defaulted

=== Finals ===
Quarterfinals
1 | (France) Simonne Mathieu (United States) Elizabeth Ryan | 6 | 3 | 6
(United Kingdom) Mary Heeley (United Kingdom) Dorothy Round | 3 | 6 | 3
4 | (United Kingdom) Evelyn Dearman (United Kingdom) Nancy Lyle | 4 | 2
(Switzerland) Lolette Payot (United Kingdom) MA Thomas | 6 | 6
2 | (United States) Helen Jacobs (United States) Sarah Palfrey | 3 | 6 | 1
(United States) Dorothy Andrus (France) Sylvie Henrotin | 6 | 4 | 6
(United Kingdom) Kitty Godfree (United Kingdom) Peggy Scriven | 6 | 6
(United Kingdom) Elsa Haylock (United Kingdom) Ruth Kirk | 3 | 4

Semifinals
1 | (France) Simonne Mathieu (United States) Elizabeth Ryan | 7 | 6
(Switzerland) Lolette Payot (United Kingdom) MA Thomas | 5 | 0
(United States) Dorothy Andrus (France) Sylvie Henrotin | 6 | 12
(United Kingdom) Kitty Godfree (United Kingdom) Peggy Scriven | 3 | 10

Final
1 | (France) Simonne Mathieu (United States) Elizabeth Ryan | 6 | 6
(United States) Dorothy Andrus (France) Sylvie Henrotin | 3 | 3

=== Top half ===
==== Section 1 ====
First round
1 | (France) Simonne Mathieu (United States) Elizabeth Ryan | 6 | 6
(Austria) Gabriele Szapáry (United Kingdom) Mary Whitmarsh | 2 | 1
(United Kingdom) Nora Martin (United Kingdom) Gladys Southwell | 5 | 6 | 3
Q | (United Kingdom) Thelma Jarvis (United Kingdom) Audrey Wright | 7 | 2 | 6
(France) Ida Adamoff (France) Jacqueline Goldschmidt | 1 | 6
(United Kingdom) Mary Heeley (United Kingdom) Dorothy Round | 6 | 8
(Australia) Nell Hopman (United Kingdom) Phyllis Satterthwaite | 6 | 0 | 6
Q | (United Kingdom) Joan Marshall (United Kingdom) Jeanette Morfey | 4 | 6 | 3

Second round
1 | (France) S Mathieu (United States) E Ryan
(Germany) Cilly Aussem (Germany) Marie Horn | w/o
Q | (United Kingdom) T Jarvis (United Kingdom) A Wright | 6 | 8
(United Kingdom) Helen Burr (United Kingdom) Yvonne Law | 8 | 10
(United Kingdom) M Heeley (United Kingdom) D Round
(United Kingdom) Lucy Pennycuick (United Kingdom) Mie Trentham | w/o
(Australia) E Hopman (United Kingdom) P Satterthwaite | 6 | 6
(United Kingdom) Elsie Pittman (United Kingdom) Joan Ridley | 2 | 4

Third round
1 | (France) S Mathieu (United States) E Ryan | 6 | 8
(United Kingdom) H Burr (United Kingdom) Y Law | 4 | 6
(United Kingdom) M Heeley (United Kingdom) D Round | 6 | 6
(Australia) E Hopman (United Kingdom) P Satterthwaite | 2 | 2

Quarterfinals
1 | (France) S Mathieu (United States) E Ryan | 6 | 3 | 6
(United Kingdom) M Heeley (United Kingdom) D Round | 3 | 6 | 3

==== Section 2 ====
First round
4 | (United Kingdom) Evelyn Dearman (United Kingdom) Nancy Lyle | 6 | 6
(United States) Virginia Rice (Denmark) Hilde Sperling | 2 | 2
(Netherlands) Madzy Couquerque (Italy) Lucia Valerio | 6 | 6
Q | (South Africa) Dulcie Kitson (United Kingdom) J McAlpine | 1 | 1
(United Kingdom) Cecily Marriott (United Kingdom) Madge Slaney | 6 | 6 | 6
(United Kingdom) Joy Cunningham (United Kingdom) Evelyn Honeyman | 1 | 8 | 3
(Switzerland) Lolette Payot (United Kingdom) MA Thomas
(United States) Carolin Babcock (United States) Josephine Cruickshank | w/o

Second round
4 | (United Kingdom) E Dearman (United Kingdom) N Lyle | 7 | 6
(United Kingdom) Joy Mowbray-Green (United Kingdom) Jean Saunders | 5 | 0
(Netherlands) M Couquerque (Italy) L Valerio | 3 | 6 | 4
(United Kingdom) Phyllis Covell (United Kingdom) Dorothy Shepherd-Barron | 6 | 4 | 6
(United Kingdom) C Marriott (United Kingdom) M Slaney | 6 | 5 | 6
Q | (United Kingdom) Dora Beazley (United Kingdom) Barbara Drew | 3 | 7 | 8
(Switzerland) L Payot (United Kingdom) MA Thomas | 6 | 6
(United Kingdom) Margaret Mellows (United Kingdom) Joan Strawson | 4 | 2

Third round
4 | (United Kingdom) E Dearman (United Kingdom) N Lyle | 4 | 6 | 6
(United Kingdom) P Covell (United Kingdom) D Shepherd-Barron | 6 | 4 | 3
Q | (United Kingdom) D Beazley (United Kingdom) B Drew | 4 | 1
(Switzerland) L Payot (United Kingdom) MA Thomas | 6 | 6

Quarterfinals
4 | (United Kingdom) E Dearman (United Kingdom) N Lyle | 4 | 2
(Switzerland) L Payot (United Kingdom) MA Thomas | 6 | 6

=== Bottom half ===
==== Section 3 ====
First round
2 | (United States) Helen Jacobs (United States) Sarah Palfrey | 6 | 6
(United Kingdom) Susan Noel (United Kingdom) Beatrice Russell | 3 | 4
(Poland) Jadwiga Jędrzejowska (United Kingdom) Vera Montgomery | 3 | 3
(United Kingdom) Eileen Fearnley-Whittingstall (United Kingdom) Billie Yorke | 6 | 6
Q | (United Kingdom) Phyllis Grover (United Kingdom) Penny Weekes | 3 | 1
(United Kingdom) Joan Ingram (United Kingdom) Freda Scott | 6 | 6
(United Kingdom) Florence Ford (United Kingdom) Sylvia Mayne | 4 | 2
(United Kingdom) Phyllis King (United Kingdom) Kay Stammers | 6 | 6

Second round
2 | (United States) H Jacobs (United States) S Palfrey
(United Kingdom) Doris Howard (France) Colette Rosambert | w/o
(United Kingdom) E Fearnley-Whittingstall (United Kingdom) A Yorke | 6 | 6
(United Kingdom) Gaby Curtis (United Kingdom) Andree Lucas | 2 | 0
(United Kingdom) J Ingram (United Kingdom) F Scott | 2 | 6
(United States) Dorothy Andrus (France) Sylvie Henrotin | 6 | 8
(United Kingdom) P King (United Kingdom) K Stammers | 6 | 4 | 6
(United Kingdom) Gethyn Harry (United Kingdom) Effie Peters | 2 | 6 | 2

Third round
2 | (United States) H Jacobs (United States) S Palfrey | 6 | 3 | 6
(United Kingdom) E Fearnley-Whittingstall (United Kingdom) A Yorke | 2 | 6 | 4
(United States) D Andrus (France) S Henrotin | 1 | 6 | 6
(United Kingdom) P King (United Kingdom) K Stammers | 6 | 2 | 3

Quarterfinals
2 | (United States) H Jacobs (United States) S Palfrey | 3 | 6 | 1
(United States) D Andrus (France) S Henrotin | 6 | 4 | 6

==== Section 4 ====
First round
3 | (United Kingdom) Freda James (United Kingdom) Betty Nuthall | 6 | 6
(United Kingdom) Sybil Edwards (United Kingdom) Betty Uber | 2 | 4
(United Kingdom) Mary Hardwick (United Kingdom) Ermyntrude Harvey | 7 | 2 | 2
(United Kingdom) Kitty Godfree (United Kingdom) Peggy Scriven | 5 | 6 | 6
(Belgium) Nelly Adamson (Belgium) Miriamme de Borman | 2 | 6
(United Kingdom) Gladys Clarke-Jervoise (United Kingdom) Mildred Nonweiler | 6 | 8
(United Kingdom) Mary Burgess-Smith (Australia) Esna Robertson | 6 | 5 | 6
(United Kingdom) Dorothy Crichton (United Kingdom) Madie Moss | 2 | 7 | 1

Second round
3 | (United Kingdom) W James (United Kingdom) B Nuthall | 4 | 6 | 6
(United Kingdom) Patricia Brazier (United Kingdom) Christabel Wheatcroft | 6 | 2 | 4
(United Kingdom) K Godfree (United Kingdom) M Scriven | 8 | 6
(Hungary) Magda Baumgarten (Spain) Josefa de Chavarri | 6 | 3
(United Kingdom) G Clarke-Jervoise (United Kingdom) M Nonweiler | 3 | 4
(United Kingdom) Elsa Haylock (United Kingdom) Ruth Kirk | 6 | 6
(United Kingdom) M Burgess-Smith (Australia) E Robertson | 6 | 6 | 0
(Australia) Joan Hartigan (Australia) Maud Molesworth | 8 | 4 | 6

Third round
(United Kingdom) W James (United Kingdom) B Nuthall | 3 | 5
(United Kingdom) K Godfree (United Kingdom) M Scriven | 6 | 7
(United Kingdom) E Haylock (United Kingdom) R Kirk | 6 | 3 | 6
(Australia) J Hartigan (Australia) M Molesworth | 4 | 6 | 2

Quarterfinals
(United Kingdom) K Godfree (United Kingdom) M Scriven | 6 | 6
(United Kingdom) E Haylock (United Kingdom) R Kirk | 3 | 4
