= 1936 Wimbledon Championships – Mixed doubles =

Mixed doubles
- 1936 Wimbledon Championships

Final
- Champions: (United Kingdom) Fred Perry (United Kingdom) Dorothy Round
- Runners-up: (United States) Don Budge (United States) Sarah Fabyan
- Score: 7–9, 7–5, 6–4

Details
- Draw: 80 (5Q)
- Seeds: 4

Events
Singles	men	women		boys	girls
Doubles	men	women	mixed	boys	girls
- Wimbledon Championships

Fred Perry and Dorothy Round successfully defended their title, defeating Don Budge and Sarah Fabyan in the final, 7–9, 7–5, 6–4 to win the mixed doubles tennis title at the 1936 Wimbledon Championships.

== Seeds ==
1. (United Kingdom) Fred Perry / (United Kingdom) Dorothy Round (champions)
2. (United States) Don Budge / (United States) Sarah Fabyan (final)
3. (France) Jean Borotra / (United Kingdom) Susan Noel (fourth round)
4. (New Zealand) Cam Malfroy / (Denmark) Hilde Sperling (semifinals)

Click on the seed number of a player to go to their draw section.

== Draw ==
Key

- Q = Qualifier
- WC = Wild card
- LL = Lucky loser
- Alt = Alternate
- ITF = ITF entry
- PR = Protected ranking
- SR = Special ranking
- SE = Special exempt
- JE = Junior exempt
- JR = Junior Accelerator Programme entrant
- CO = College Accelerator Programme entrant
- NG = Next Gen Accelerator Program entrant
- w/o = Walkover
- r = Retired
- d = Defaulted

=== Finals ===
Quarterfinals
2	(United States) Don Budge (United States) Sarah Fabyan	6	6
(Kingdom of Yugoslavia) Franjo Kukuljević (France) Lilí de la Valdène	0	2
4	(New Zealand) Cam Malfroy (Denmark) Hilde Sperling	7	6
(France) André Martin-Legeay (France) Sylvie Henrotin	5	3
(United Kingdom) John Olliff (United Kingdom) Betty Nuthall	6	10	1
(United Kingdom) Frank Wilde (United Kingdom) Mary Whitmarsh	4	12	6
(France) Yvon Petra (France) Simonne Mathieu	4	5
1	(United Kingdom) Fred Perry (United Kingdom) Dorothy Round	6	6

Semifinals
2	(United States) Don Budge (United States) Sarah Fabyan	6	6
4	(New Zealand) Cam Malfroy (Denmark) Hilde Sperling	4	3
(United Kingdom) Frank Wilde (United Kingdom) Mary Whitmarsh	4	6	3
1	(United Kingdom) Fred Perry (United Kingdom) Dorothy Round	6	1	6

Final
2	(United States) Don Budge (United States) Sarah Fabyan	9	5	4
1	(United Kingdom) Fred Perry (United Kingdom) Dorothy Round	7	7	6

=== Top half ===
==== Section 1 ====
First round

Second round
2	(United States) Don Budge (United States) Sarah Fabyan	6	7
(Republic of Ireland) George McVeagh (Republic of Ireland) Hilda Wallis	1	5
(Austria) Adam Baworowski (United Kingdom) Madge Slaney	2	6	4
(United Kingdom) Charles Fawcus (United Kingdom) Margot Lumb	6	3	6
(United Kingdom) W Filmer Sankey (United Kingdom) Audrey Wright	4	3
(United Kingdom) Bobby Meredith (United Kingdom) Ruth Kirk	6	6
(United Kingdom) Bunny Austin (United Kingdom) Kay Stammers
(Republic of Ireland) Henry Purcell (United Kingdom) Nancy Dickin	w/o

Third round
2	(United States) D Budge (United States) S Fabyan	6	6
(United Kingdom) C Fawcus (United Kingdom) M Lumb	3	1
(United Kingdom) G Meredith (United Kingdom) R Kirk	0	6	3
(United Kingdom) H Austin (United Kingdom) K Stammers	6	4	6

Fourth round
2	(United States) D Budge (United States) S Fabyan	7	6	6
(United Kingdom) H Austin (United Kingdom) K Stammers	9	3	1

==== Section 2 ====
First round

Second round
(United Kingdom) John Leader (United Kingdom) Andree Lucas	6	6
(Canada) Robert Murray (Hungary) Magda Baumgarten	0	4
(Belgium) Jack Van den Eynde (Belgium) Beatrice Watson	3	4
(Kingdom of Yugoslavia) Franjo Kukuljević (France) Lilí de la Valdène	6	6
(United Kingdom) Jimmy Hunt (United Kingdom) Yvonne Law	6	16
(United Kingdom) Charles Kingsley (United Kingdom) Penny Weekes	3	14
(United Kingdom) George Ewart Bean (United Kingdom) CJ Tyrrell	4	1
(United Kingdom) Ted Avory (United Kingdom) Joan Strawson	6	6

Third round
(United Kingdom) J Leader (United Kingdom) A Lucas	1	1
(Kingdom of Yugoslavia) F Kukuljević (France) E de la Valdène	6	6
(United Kingdom) J Hunt (United Kingdom) Y Law	9	4	6
(United Kingdom) E Avory (United Kingdom) J Strawson	7	6	2

Fourth round
(Kingdom of Yugoslavia) F Kukuljević (France) E de la Valdène	5	6	6
(United Kingdom) J Hunt (United Kingdom) Y Law	7	2	4

==== Section 3 ====
First round

Second round
4	(New Zealand) Cam Malfroy (Denmark) Hilde Sperling	5
(United Kingdom) Pat Sherwood (United Kingdom) Helen Burr	0^{r}
(United States) Bill Robertson (Sweden) Marianne Wittenström	6	6
(United Kingdom) Don Butler (United Kingdom) Elsie Pittman	1	3
(United Kingdom) David Williams (United Kingdom) Joy Mowbray-Green	6	1	6
(Netherlands) Josef Knottenbelt (Netherlands) Truid Terwindt	4	6	0
(United States) David Jones (United Kingdom) Helen Dyson	7	3
(France) Jacques Brugnon (Poland) Jadwiga Jędrzejowska	9	6

Third round
4	(New Zealand) C Malfroy (Denmark) H Sperling	6	6
(United States) W Robertson (Sweden) M Wittenström	1	0
(United Kingdom) D Williams (United Kingdom) J Mowbray-Green	2	4
(France) J Brugnon (Poland) J Jędrzejowska	6	6

Fourth round
4	(New Zealand) C Malfroy (Denmark) H Sperling	6	6
(France) J Brugnon (Poland) J Jędrzejowska	3	3

==== Section 4 ====
First round
(France) Jean Lesueur (United Kingdom) Elsa Haylock	4	4
(United States) John Van Ryn (United States) Marjorie Van Ryn	6	6
(United Kingdom) Dickie Ritchie (United Kingdom) Ermyntrude Harvey	3	3
(Spain) Enrique Maier (United Kingdom) Joan Ingram	6	6
(New Zealand) Alan Stedman (United Kingdom) Mary Heeley	6	6
(United Kingdom) Henry Billington (United Kingdom) Betty Hobson	0	2
(Germany) Daniel Prenn (United Kingdom) Evelyn Dearman	6	6
(United Kingdom) Pat Hughes (United Kingdom) Nancy Lyle	3	4
(United Kingdom) Laddie Wheatcroft (United Kingdom) Christabel Wheatcroft	3	9	4
(United States) Hal Surface (United States) Dorothy Andrus	6	7	6
(Netherlands) Hans van Swol (United Kingdom) Sheila Paterson	6	7
(United Kingdom) RC Wackett (United Kingdom) Cecily Marriott	1	5
(United Kingdom) Murray Deloford (United Kingdom) Nina Brown	2	6	7
Q	(United Kingdom) Jimmy Jones (United Kingdom) Pat Owen	6	4	5
(France) André Martin-Legeay (France) Sylvie Henrotin	6	6
Q	(United Kingdom) Maurice Lucking (United Kingdom) Gladys Osborne	3	4

Second round
(United States) J Van Ryn (United States) M Van Ryn	6	6
(Spain) E Maier (United Kingdom) J Ingram	1	0
(New Zealand) A Stedman (United Kingdom) M Heeley	3	6	1
(Germany) D Prenn (United Kingdom) E Dearman	6	4	6
(United States) H Surface (United States) D Andrus	2	6	3
(Netherlands) A van Swol (United Kingdom) S Paterson	6	3	6
(United Kingdom) M Deloford (United Kingdom) N Brown	0	3
(France) A Martin-Legeay (France) S Henrotin	6	6

Third round
(United States) J Van Ryn (United States) M Van Ryn	8	6
(Germany) D Prenn (United Kingdom) E Dearman	6	3
(Netherlands) A van Swol (United Kingdom) S Paterson	3	4
(France) A Martin-Legeay (France) S Henrotin	6	6

Fourth round
(United States) J Van Ryn (United States) M Van Ryn	1	5
(France) A Martin-Legeay (France) S Henrotin	6	7

=== Bottom half ===
==== Section 5 ====
First round
(United Kingdom) John Olliff (United Kingdom) Betty Nuthall	6	4	7
Q	(United Kingdom) Ronnie Shayes (United Kingdom) Irene Cater	3	6	5
(United Kingdom) Harry Lee (United Kingdom) Freda James	6	6
(Norway) Johan Haanes (France) Elizabeth Macready	2	2
(United Kingdom) Donald MacPhail (United Kingdom) Mary Hardwick	6	4	6
(France) Pierre Pellizza (France) Edith Belliard	1	6	3
(United Kingdom) Guy Cooper (United Kingdom) Valerie Scott	4	6	3
(United Kingdom) Bob Tinkler (United Kingdom) Valerie King	6	1	6
(Austria) Richard von Planner (Austria) Rosl Kraus	6	6
Q	(United Kingdom) Frederick Melland (United Kingdom) Denise Huntbach	1	2
(United States) Gerry Stratford (United Kingdom) Mrs CP Brutton	6	7
(Japan) Eikishi Ito (United Kingdom) Betty Couper	4	5
(United Kingdom) George Godsell (United Kingdom) Gethyn Harry	w/o
(United Kingdom) Herman David (United Kingdom) Effie Peters
(United Kingdom) Eric Attewell (United Kingdom) Rosemary Smith	6	2	9
(Switzerland) Charles Aeschlimann (United Kingdom) Patsy O'Connell	3	6	11

Second round
(United Kingdom) J Olliff (United Kingdom) B Nuthall	4	6	7
(United Kingdom) H Lee (United Kingdom) W James	6	2	5
(United Kingdom) D MacPhail (United Kingdom) M Hardwick	7	4	6
(United Kingdom) R Tinkler (United Kingdom) V King	5	6	3
(Austria) R von Planner (Austria) R Kraus
(United States) G Stratford (United Kingdom) Mrs CP Brutton	w/o
(United Kingdom) H David (United Kingdom) E Peters	9	6	2
(Switzerland) C Aeschlimann (United Kingdom) P O'Connell	11	4	6

Third round
(United Kingdom) J Olliff (United Kingdom) B Nuthall	7	6
(United Kingdom) D MacPhail (United Kingdom) M Hardwick	5	2
(Austria) R von Planner (Austria) R Kraus	2	6	7
(Switzerland) C Aeschlimann (United Kingdom) P O'Connell	6	2	5

Fourth round
(United Kingdom) J Olliff (United Kingdom) B Nuthall	6	7
(Austria) R von Planner (Austria) R Kraus	2	5

==== Section 6 ====
First round

Second round
(United Kingdom) John Comery (United Kingdom) Mona Riddell	6	4	6
Q	(United Kingdom) Stanley Hawkins (United Kingdom) T Kingsbury	3	6	2
(United Kingdom) Ian Collins (Belgium) Josane de Meulemeester	4	2
(United Kingdom) Frank Wilde (United Kingdom) Mary Whitmarsh	6	6
(United Kingdom) Colin Ritchie (United Kingdom) Joan O'Meara
(Canada) Laird Watt; Mrs JC Bouch	w/o
(Belgium) Léopold de Borman (Belgium) Nelly Adamson	6	1	6
3	(France) Jean Borotra (United Kingdom) Susan Noel	0	6	8

Third round
(United Kingdom) J Comery (United Kingdom) M Riddell	1	2
(United Kingdom) F Wilde (United Kingdom) M Whitmarsh	6	6
(United Kingdom) C Ritchie (United Kingdom) J O'Meara	0	5
3	(France) J Borotra (United Kingdom) S Noel	6	7

Fourth round
(United Kingdom) F Wilde (United Kingdom) M Whitmarsh	2	6	6
3	(France) J Borotra (United Kingdom) S Noel	6	1	3

The nationality of Mrs JC Bouch is unknown.

==== Section 7 ====
First round

Second round
(Switzerland) Boris Maneff (United Kingdom) Margaret Mellows	2	6	7
(South Africa) Eustace Fannin (Republic of Ireland) Norma Stoker	6	4	5
(United States) Merrimon Cuninggim (United Kingdom) Alex McOstrich	6	6
(Hungary) Emil Gábori (United Kingdom) Gaby Curtis	4	1
(Germany) Kay Lund (Germany) Marie Horn	4	8
(France) Yvon Petra (France) Simonne Mathieu	6	10
(United Kingdom) Raymond Tuckey (United Kingdom) Peggy Scriven
(France) Jacques Jamain (United Kingdom) Sylvia Mayne	w/o

Third round
(Switzerland) B Maneff (United Kingdom) M Mellows	2	1
(United States) M Cuninggim (United Kingdom) A McOstrich	6	6
(France) Y Petra (France) S Mathieu	3	7	7
(United Kingdom) R Tuckey (United Kingdom) M Scriven	6	5	5

Fourth round
(United States) M Cuninggim (United Kingdom) A McOstrich	4	5
(France) Y Petra (France) S Mathieu	6	7

==== Section 8 ====
First round

Second round
(Netherlands) Hendrik Timmer (Netherlands) Madzy Couquerque
(United States) Gene Mako (United States) Carolin Babcock	w/o
(Czechoslovakia) Josef Caska (United Kingdom) Joy Cunningham	4	6	3
(United Kingdom) Jack Lysaght (United Kingdom) Billie Yorke	6	4	6
(United Kingdom) Charles Hare (United Kingdom) Jean Saunders	4	6	3
(South Africa) Pat Spence (South Africa) Audrey Allister	6	3	6
(Greece) Georgios Nikolaides (Greece) Phyllis Xydis	w/o
1	(United Kingdom) Fred Perry (United Kingdom) Dorothy Round

Third round
(Netherlands) H Timmer (Netherlands) M Couquerque	5	6	6
(United Kingdom) J Lysaght (United Kingdom) A Yorke	7	3	2
(South Africa) P Spence (South Africa) A Allister	2	3
1	(United Kingdom) F Perry (United Kingdom) D Round	6	6

Fourth round
(Netherlands) H Timmer (Netherlands) M Couquerque	7	6	2
1	(United Kingdom) F Perry (United Kingdom) D Round	9	4	6
