= 1936 Wimbledon Championships – Women's singles =

Women's singles
- 1936 Wimbledon Championships

Final
- Champion: (United States) Helen Jacobs
- Runner-up: (Denmark) Hilde Sperling
- Score: 6–2, 4–6, 7–5

Details
- Draw: 96 (10Q)
- Seeds: 8

Events
Singles	men	women		boys	girls
Doubles	men	women	mixed	boys	girls
- Wimbledon Championships

Helen Jacobs defeated Hilde Sperling in the final, 6–2, 4–6, 7–5 to win the ladies' singles tennis title at the 1936 Wimbledon Championships. Helen Moody was the defending champion, but did not compete.

== Seeds ==
1. (United Kingdom) Dorothy Round (quarterfinals)
2. (United States) Helen Jacobs (champion)
3. (United States) Sarah Fabyan (first round)
4. (United Kingdom) Kay Stammers (quarterfinals)
5. (Denmark) Hilde Sperling (final)
6. (France) Simonne Mathieu (semifinals)
7. (Poland) Jadwiga Jędrzejowska (semifinals)
8. (Chile) Anita Lizana (quarterfinals)

Click on the seed number of a player to go to their draw section.

== Draw ==
Key

- Q = Qualifier
- WC = Wild card
- LL = Lucky loser
- Alt = Alternate
- ITF = ITF entry
- PR = Protected ranking
- SR = Special ranking
- SE = Special exempt
- JE = Junior exempt
- JR = Junior Accelerator Programme entrant
- CO = College Accelerator Programme entrant
- NG = Next Gen Accelerator Program entrant
- w/o = Walkover
- r = Retired
- d = Defaulted

=== Finals ===
Quarterfinals
2	(United States) Helen Jacobs	6	1	6
8	(Chile) Anita Lizana	2	6	4
4	(United Kingdom) Kay Stammers	2	3
7	(Poland) Jadwiga Jedrzejowska	6	6
6	(France) Simonne Mathieu	7	6
(Germany) Marie Horn	5	3
5	(Denmark) Hilde Sperling	6	8
1	(United Kingdom) Dorothy Round	3	6

Semifinals
2	(United States) Helen Jacobs	6	6
7	(Poland) Jadwiga Jedrzejowska	4	2
6	(France) Simonne Mathieu	3	2
5	(Denmark) Hilde Sperling	6	6

Final
2	(United States) Helen Jacobs	6	4	7
5	(Denmark) Hilde Sperling	2	6	5

=== Top half ===
==== Section 1 ====
First round

Second round
2	(United States) Helen Jacobs	6	6
Q	(United Kingdom) Marjorie Cable	1	0
(France) Jacqueline Goldschmidt	6	6
(United Kingdom) Nancy Lyle	3	2
(Greece) Phyllis Xydis	0	6
(United Kingdom) Mrs EWA Luxton	6	8
(United Kingdom) Ruth Kirk	3	2
(France) Lilí de la Valdène	6	6

Third round
2	(United States) H Jacobs	6	6
(France) J Goldschmidt	1	0
(United Kingdom) E Luxton	2	1
(France) E de la Valdène	6	6

Fourth round
2	(United States) H Jacobs	6	6
(France) E de la Valdène	4	3

==== Section 2 ====
First round

Second round
8	(Chile) Anita Lizana	6	6
(Hungary) Magda Baumgarten	1	1
(Sweden) Marianne Wittenström	4	0
(Republic of Ireland) Hilda Wallis	6	6
(United Kingdom) Elsa Haylock	3	4
(United Kingdom) Mary Heeley	6	6
(United Kingdom) Nancy Dickin	6	6
(United Kingdom) Sonia Mavrogordato	1	1

Third round
8	(Chile) A Lizana
(Republic of Ireland) H Wallis	w/o
(United Kingdom) M Heeley	6	2
(United Kingdom) N Dickin	3	2^{r}

Fourth round
8	(Chile) A Lizana	6	6
(United Kingdom) M Heeley	3	3

==== Section 3 ====
First round
4	(United Kingdom) Kay Stammers	6	6
(United Kingdom) Vere King	1	2
(United Kingdom) Rosemary Smith	4	2
(United Kingdom) Audrey Wright	6	6
(Belgium) Josane de Meulemeester	6	8	8
(France) Edith Belliard	1	10	6
(United States) Marjorie Van Ryn	3	4
(United Kingdom) Billie Yorke	6	6
(United Kingdom) Jean Saunders	6	1	6
(United Kingdom) Peggy Scriven	4	6	2
(United Kingdom) Rita Jarvis	6	6
(United Kingdom) Joy Cunningham	2	4
(United Kingdom) Yvonne Law	4	3
(United Kingdom) Freda James	6	6
(United Kingdom) Mollie Trouncer	2	6	3
(United Kingdom) Penny Weekes	6	2	6

Second round
4	(United Kingdom) K Stammers	6	6
(United Kingdom) A Wright	3	0
(Belgium) J de Meulemeester	6	6
(United Kingdom) A Yorke	4	1
(United Kingdom) J Saunders	4	6	6
(United Kingdom) R Jarvis	6	4	1
(United Kingdom) W James	7	6	6
(United Kingdom) P Weekes	9	3	2

Third round
4	(United Kingdom) K Stammers	6	6
(Belgium) J de Meulemeester	4	0
(United Kingdom) J Saunders	6	4	3
(United Kingdom) W James	3	6	6

Fourth round
4	(United Kingdom) K Stammers	7	6
(United Kingdom) W James	5	2

==== Section 4 ====
First round
7	(Poland) Jadwiga Jędrzejowska	6	6
(United Kingdom) Mona Riddell	4	4
(United Kingdom) Joy Mowbray-Green	6	6
(United Kingdom) Patience Thomson	4	1
(United Kingdom) Alex McOstrich	3	6	7
(United Kingdom) Florence Ford	6	4	5
Q	(United Kingdom) L Green	1	1
(United Kingdom) Phyllis King	6	6
(South Africa) Audrey Allister	3	1
(United Kingdom) Susan Noel	6	6
(United Kingdom) Madge Slaney	6	6
(United Kingdom) Thelma Kingsbury	3	1
(United Kingdom) Gladys Southwell	4	6	6
(Netherlands) Truid Terwindt	6	1	4
Q	(United Kingdom) Pat Owen	5	6
(United Kingdom) Margot Lumb	7	8

Second round
7	(Poland) J Jędrzejowska	6	6
(United Kingdom) J Mowbray-Green	2	2
(United Kingdom) A McOstrich	0	6	3
(United Kingdom) P King	6	4	6
(United Kingdom) S Noel	6	6
(United Kingdom) M Slaney	2	2
(United Kingdom) G Southwell	3	3
(United Kingdom) M Lumb	6	6

Third round
7	(Poland) J Jędrzejowska	6	6
(United Kingdom) P King	3	2
(United Kingdom) S Noel
(United Kingdom) M Lumb	w/o

Fourth round
7	(Poland) J Jędrzejowska	6	4	6
(United Kingdom) S Noel	1	6	2

=== Bottom half ===
==== Section 5 ====
First round
(Netherlands) Ada Werring	w/o
(United Kingdom) Molly Hargreaves
(United Kingdom) Nina Brown	6	0	3
(United Kingdom) Andree Lucas	1	6	6
(United Kingdom) Mary Hardwick	6	6
Q	(United Kingdom) Denise Huntbach	1	2
(Republic of Ireland) Norma Stoker	3	5
(United Kingdom) Joan Ingram	6	7
Q	(United Kingdom) Mary Bowden	6	6
Q	(United Kingdom) Enid Broadbridge	2	3
(United Kingdom) Gethyn Harry	4	6
(United States) Dorothy Andrus	6	8
(United Kingdom) Sheila Chuter	2	4
(United Kingdom) Evelyn Dearman	6	6
(United Kingdom) Ermyntrude Harvey	0	1
6	(France) Simonne Mathieu	6	6

Second round
(United Kingdom) M Hargreaves	3	2
(United Kingdom) A Lucas	6	6
(United Kingdom) M Hardwick	6	7
(United Kingdom) J Ingram	1	5
Q	(United Kingdom) M Bowden	4	5
(United States) D Andrus	6	7
(United Kingdom) E Dearman	3	2
6	(France) S Mathieu	6	6

Third round
(United Kingdom) A Lucas	6	3
(United Kingdom) M Hardwick	8	6
(United States) D Andrus	4	6	3
6	(France) S Mathieu	6	4	6

Fourth round
(United Kingdom) M Hardwick	2	6	5
6	(France) S Mathieu	6	4	7

==== Section 6 ====
First round
(United Kingdom) Joan Strawson	4	6	6
Q	(United Kingdom) Edie Rudd	6	2	2
(United Kingdom) Elsie Pittman	6	8
(United Kingdom) Betty Couper	2	6
(United Kingdom) Sheila Paterson	2	6	2
(United Kingdom) Gaby Curtis	6	4	6
(United Kingdom) Cristobel Wheatcroft	3	3
(United Kingdom) Effie Peters	6	6
(Netherlands) Madzy Couquerque	6	6
(United Kingdom) Dora Beazley	0	4
(United Kingdom) Joan O'Meara	8	3	2
(United Kingdom) Jeanette Morfey	6	6	6
(United Kingdom) Madie Moss	4	3
(United Kingdom) Valerie Scott	6	6
(Germany) Marie Horn	6	7
3	(United States) Sarah Fabyan	3	5

Second round
(United Kingdom) J Strawson	3	5
(United Kingdom) E Pittman	6	7
(United Kingdom) G Curtis	6	6
(United Kingdom) E Peters	2	3
(Netherlands) M Couquerque	6	6
(United Kingdom) J Morfey	4	1
(United Kingdom) V Scott	6	2
(Germany) M Horn	8	6

Third round
(United Kingdom) E Pittman	3	5
(United Kingdom) G Curtis	6	7
(Netherlands) M Couquerque	3	0
(Germany) M Horn	6	6

Fourth round
(United Kingdom) G Curtis	3	3
(Germany) M Horn	6	6

==== Section 7 ====
First round

Second round
(France) Sylvie Henrotin	6	6
(United Kingdom) Gaby Osborne	4	2
(United Kingdom) Madge List	3	3
(Belgium) Nelly Adamson	6	6
(United States) Carolin Babcock	6	6
Q	(United Kingdom) Nancy Fontes	2	3
(United Kingdom) Patsy O'Connell	5	2
5	(Denmark) Hilde Sperling	7	6

Third round
(France) S Henrotin	4	6	7
(Belgium) N Adamson	6	4	9
(United States) C Babcock	5	1
5	(Denmark) H Sperling	7	6

Fourth round
(Belgium) N Adamson	1	0
5	(Denmark) H Sperling	6	6

==== Section 8 ====
First round

Second round
(United Kingdom) Mary Whitmarsh	2	6	6
Q	(United Kingdom) Mie Trentham	6	1	2
(United Kingdom) Betty Hobson	6	7
Q	(United States) Anne Page	0	5
(United Kingdom) Pamela Morison	5	5
(Austria) Rosl Kraus	7	7
(United Kingdom) Betty Nuthall	7	3
1	(United Kingdom) Dorothy Round	9	6

Third round
(United Kingdom) M Whitmarsh	6	7
(United Kingdom) B Hobson	3	5
(Austria) R Kraus	1	3
1	(United Kingdom) D Round	6	6

Fourth round
(United Kingdom) M Whitmarsh	4	2
1	(United Kingdom) D Round	6	6

Preceded by 1936 French Championships	Grand Slams; Women's Singles	Succeeded by 1936 U.S. National Championships
