= 1934 U.S. National Championships – Women's singles =

Women's singles
- 1934 U.S. National Championships

Final
- Champion: (United States) Helen Jacobs
- Runner-up: (United States) Sarah Palfrey
- Score: 6–1, 6–4

Events
| Singles | men | women |
| Doubles | men | women |
| ← 1933 · | U.S. National Championships | · 1935 → |

First-seeded Helen Jacobs defeated second-seeded Sarah Palfrey 6–1, 6–4 in the final to win the women's singles tennis title at the 1934 U.S. National Championships.

== Seeds ==
The tournament used two lists of four players for seeding the women's singles event; one for U.S. players and one for foreign players. Helen Jacobs is the champion; others show in brackets the round in which they were eliminated.

1. (United States) Helen Jacobs (champion)
2. (United States) Sarah Palfrey (finalist)
3. (United States) Carolin Babcock (semifinals)
4. (United States) Dorothy Andrus (semifinals)
5. (United Kingdom) Betty Nuthall (second round)
6. (United Kingdom) Kay Stammers (quarterfinals)
7. (United Kingdom) ?
8. (United Kingdom) Freda James (quarterfinals)

== Draw ==
=== Final eight ===
Quarterfinals
2 | (United States) Sarah Palfrey | 6 | 3 | 6
(4) | (United Kingdom) Freda James | 3 | 6 | 1
4 | (United States) Dorothy Andrus | 6 | 6
(United States) Maud Rosenbaum | 1 | 4
2 | (United States) Helen Jacobs | 6 | 6
(United States) Elizabeth Ryan | 1 | 0
3 | (United States) Carolin Babcock | 6 | 2 | 6
(1) | (United Kingdom) Kay Stammers | 3 | 6 | 4

Semifinals
2 | (United States) Sarah Palfrey | 6 | 6
4 | (United States) Dorothy Andrus | 3 | 4
1 | (United States) Helen Jacobs | 7 | 6
3 | (United States) Carolin Babcock | 5 | 0

Finals
2 | (United States) Sarah Palfrey | 1 | 4
1 | (United States) Helen Jacobs | 6 | 6

| Preceded by 1934 Wimbledon Championships – Women's singles | Grand Slam women's singles | Succeeded by 1935 Australian Championships – Women's singles |
