= 1934 Wimbledon Championships – Women's singles =

Women's singles
- 1934 Wimbledon Championships

Final
- Champion: (United Kingdom) Dorothy Round
- Runner-up: (United States) Helen Jacobs
- Score: 6–2, 5–7, 6–3

Details
- Draw: 96 (10Q)
- Seeds: 8

Events
Singles	men	women		boys	girls
Doubles	men	women	mixed	boys	girls
- Wimbledon Championships

Dorothy Round defeated Helen Jacobs in the final, 6–2, 5–7, 6–3 to win the ladies' singles tennis title at the 1934 Wimbledon Championships.

Helen Moody was the defending champion, but did not compete.

== Seeds ==
1. (United States) Helen Jacobs (final)
2. (United Kingdom) Dorothy Round (champion)
3. (United States) Sarah Palfrey (quarterfinals)
4. (Denmark) Hilde Sperling (fourth round)
5. (United Kingdom) Peggy Scriven (quarterfinals)
6. (Switzerland) Lolette Payot (quarterfinals)
7. (Germany) Cilly Aussem (quarterfinals)
8. (France) Simonne Mathieu (semifinals)

Click on the seed number of a player to go to their draw section.

== Draw ==
Key

- Q = Qualifier
- WC = Wild card
- LL = Lucky loser
- Alt = Alternate
- ITF = ITF entry
- PR = Protected ranking
- SR = Special ranking
- SE = Special exempt
- JE = Junior exempt
- JR = Junior Accelerator Programme entrant
- CO = College Accelerator Programme entrant
- NG = Next Gen Accelerator Program entrant
- w/o = Walkover
- r = Retired
- d = Defaulted

=== Finals ===
Quarterfinals
2	(United Kingdom) Dorothy Round	6	6
6	(Switzerland) Lolette Payot	4	2
3	(United States) Sarah Palfrey	3	8	2
8	(France) Simonne Mathieu	6	6	6
1	(United States) Helen Jacobs	6	6
7	(Germany) Cilly Aussem	0	2
(Australia) Joan Hartigan	3	6	6
5	(United Kingdom) Peggy Scriven	6	3	1

Semifinals
2	(United Kingdom) Dorothy Round	6	5	6
8	(France) Simonne Mathieu	4	7	2
1	(United States) Helen Jacobs	6	6
(Australia) Joan Hartigan	2	2

Final
2	(United Kingdom) Dorothy Round	6	5	6
1	(United States) Helen Jacobs	2	7	3

=== Top half ===
==== Section 1 ====
First round
2	(United Kingdom) Dorothy Round	6	6
(United Kingdom) Joan Ridley	2	0
(United Kingdom) Mary Heeley	6	6
(United Kingdom) Patricia Brazier	3	2
(Netherlands) Madzy Couquerque	6	7
(Australia) Maud Molesworth	4	5
Q	(United Kingdom) Molly Hargreaves	0	1
(United Kingdom) Phyllis King	6	6

Second round
2	(United Kingdom) D Round	6	6
(United Kingdom) Vera Montgomery	0	1
(United Kingdom) M Heeley	6	6
(United Kingdom) Helen Dyson	2	2
(Netherlands) M Couquerque	4	6	6
(United Kingdom) Joy Mowbray-Green	6	4	3
(United Kingdom) P King	6	6
Q	(United Kingdom) BE Frye	2	0

Third round
2	(United Kingdom) D Round	6	6
(United Kingdom) M Heeley	3	0
(Netherlands) M Couquerque	4	3
(United Kingdom) P King	6	6

Fourth round
2	(United Kingdom) D Round	6	2	6
(United Kingdom) P King	3	6	3

==== Section 2 ====
First round
6	(Switzerland) Lolette Payot	3	6	6
(United Kingdom) Nancy Lyle	6	3	1
(France) Sylvie Henrotin	7	1	6
(United Kingdom) Elsa Haylock	5	6	2
(Spain) Josefa de Chavarri
(United States) Josephine Cruickshank	w/o
Q	(United Kingdom) Joy Cunningham	1	0
(United Kingdom) Doris Metaxa	6	6

Second round
6	(Switzerland) L Payot	6	8
(United Kingdom) Sheila Chuter	1	6
(France) S Henrotin	6	6
(Italy) Lucia Valerio	3	4
(Spain) J de Chavarri	2	3
(United Kingdom) Billie Yorke	6	6
(United Kingdom) D Howard	6	6
(United Kingdom) Christabel Wheatcroft	4	1

Third round
6	(Switzerland) L Payot	4	6	6
(France) S Henrotin	6	3	4
(United Kingdom) A Yorke
(United Kingdom) D Howard	w/o

Fourth round
6	(Switzerland) L Payot	6	6
(United Kingdom) A Yorke	3	0

==== Section 3 ====
First round
3	(United States) Sarah Palfrey	6	6
Q	(United Kingdom) Rosemary Smith	3	1
(United Kingdom) Kitty Godfree	6	8
(United Kingdom) Jean Saunders	3	6
(United Kingdom) Mary Hardwick	6	7
(United Kingdom) Gethyn Harry	3	5
(United Kingdom) Madie Moss	6	6
Q	(United Kingdom) Gladys Clarke-Jervoise	2	4

Second round
3	(United States) S Palfrey	6	6
(United Kingdom) Evelyn Dearman	3	2
(United Kingdom) K Godfree	6	6
(United Kingdom) Florence Ford	1	0
(United Kingdom) M Hardwick	6	6
(United Kingdom) Jeanette Morfey	4	1
(United Kingdom) M Moss	4	4
(Poland) Jadwiga Jędrzejowska	6	6

Third round
3	(United States) S Palfrey	6	6
(United Kingdom) K Godfree	3	1
(United Kingdom) M Hardwick	6	6	6
(Poland) J Jędrzejowska	8	3	8

Fourth round
3	(United States) S Palfrey	6	6
(Poland) J Jędrzejowska	2	2

==== Section 4 ====
First round
8	(France) Simonne Mathieu	6	6
(Australia) Esna Robertson	4	0
(Australia) Nell Hopman	6	6
Q	(United Kingdom) Nancy Dickin	3	1
(Germany) Marie Horn	7	6
(United Kingdom) Madge Slaney	5	4
(United Kingdom) Betty Nuthall	6	3	4
(United Kingdom) Eileen Fearnley-Whittingstall	2	6	6

Second round
8	(France) S Mathieu	6	6
(United Kingdom) Patience Thomson	0	2
(Australia) E Hopman	6	10
(United States) Virginia Rice	4	8
(Germany) M Horn	6	6
(United Kingdom) Susan Noel	2	2
(United Kingdom) E Fearnley-Whittingstall	0	7	1
(United Kingdom) Freda Scott	6	5	6

Third round
8	(France) S Mathieu	3	6	6
(Australia) E Hopman	6	1	3
(Germany) M Horn	5	6	6
(United Kingdom) F Scott	7	0	2

Fourth round
8	(France) S Mathieu	7	6
(Germany) M Horn	5	2

=== Bottom half ===
==== Section 5 ====
First round
1	(United States) Helen Jacobs	6	6
(United Kingdom) Effie Peters	1	1
(United Kingdom) Phyllis Satterthwaite	0	3
(United Kingdom) Joan Ingram	6	6
(United Kingdom) MA Thomas	6	7
(United Kingdom) Sonia Mavrogordato	2	5
(United Kingdom) Betty Uber	6	1	5
(United Kingdom) Edie Rudd	4	6	7

Second round
1	(United States) H Jacobs	6	6
(United States) Dorothy Andrus	2	1
(United Kingdom) J Ingram	3	6	6
(United Kingdom) Beatrice Russell	6	4	1
(United Kingdom) MA Thomas	4	0
(France) Jacqueline Goldschmidt	6	6
(United Kingdom) E Rudd	1	1
(United Kingdom) Kay Stammers	6	6

Third round
1	(United States) H Jacobs	4	6	6
(United Kingdom) J Ingram	6	4	1
(France) J Goldschmidt	7	9
(United Kingdom) K Stammers	5	7

Fourth round
1	(United States) H Jacobs	6	6
(France) J Goldschmidt	2	3

==== Section 6 ====
First round
7	(Germany) Cilly Aussem	6	6
(United Kingdom) Phyllis Whitley	0	0
(United Kingdom) Mildred Nonweiler	6	6
(United Kingdom) Elsie Pittman	8	8
(United Kingdom) Freda James	6	1	6
(United Kingdom) Evelyn Honeyman	0	6	3
(United Kingdom) Joan Strawson	2	6	6
(United Kingdom) Andree Lucas	6	3	3

Second round
7	(Germany) C Aussem	6	6
Q	(United Kingdom) Helen Turnbull	0	1
(United Kingdom) E Pittman	3	6	3
(United Kingdom) Ermyntrude Harvey	6	3	6
(United Kingdom) W James	6	6
(United Kingdom) Mary Whitmarsh	3	4
(United Kingdom) J Strawson	6	3	6
(United Kingdom) Monica Ricketts	2	6	1

Third round
7	(Germany) C Aussem	6	6
(United Kingdom) E Harvey	1	0
(United Kingdom) W James	6	8
(United Kingdom) J Strawson	1	6

Fourth round
7	(Germany) C Aussem	6	6
(United Kingdom) W James	2	1

==== Section 7 ====
First round
4	(Denmark) Hilde Sperling	6	6
(United Kingdom) Dorothy Crichton	2	2
(United Kingdom) Sybil Edwards	4	6	7
(United Kingdom) Mona Riddell	6	4	5
(United Kingdom) Gladys Southwell	6	8	2
(India) Leela Row	4	10	6
Q	(United Kingdom) Audrey Wright	3	5
(Australia) Joan Hartigan	6	7

Second round
4	(Denmark) H Sperling	6	8
(United Kingdom) Mary Chamberlain	4	6
(United Kingdom) S Edwards	7	7	8
(United Kingdom) Dorothy Shepherd-Barron	9	5	6
(India) L Row	3	7	4
(France) Ida Adamoff	6	5	6
(Australia) J Hartigan	7	6
(Hungary) Magda Baumgarten	5	2

Third round
4	(Denmark) H Sperling	6	6
(United Kingdom) S Edwards	2	4
(France) I Adamoff	5	4
(Australia) J Hartigan	7	6

Fourth round
4	(Denmark) H Sperling	4	7	4
(Australia) J Hartigan	6	5	6

==== Section 8 ====
First round
5	(United Kingdom) Peggy Scriven	6	6
(United Kingdom) Gladys Osborne	1	2
(United Kingdom) Alex McOstrich	7	8
(South Africa) Dulcie Kitson	5	6
(United Kingdom) Margaret Mellows	6	8
(Austria) Gabriele Szapáry	1	6
Q	(United Kingdom) Mary Burgess-Smith	1	3
(France) Colette Rosambert	6	6

Second round
5	(United Kingdom) M Scriven	6	6
(United Kingdom) Ruth Kirk	0	1
(United Kingdom) A McOstrich	4	7	1
(United Kingdom) Yvonne Law	6	5	6
(United Kingdom) M Mellows	6	6
(Belgium) Nelly Adamson	1	2
(France) C Rosambert	5	2
(United States) Carolin Babcock	7	6

Third round
5	(United Kingdom) M Scriven	6	6
(United Kingdom) Y Law	3	2
(United Kingdom) M Mellows	1	3
(United States) C Babcock	6	6

Fourth round
5	(United Kingdom) M Scriven	9	6	6
(United States) C Babcock	7	8	2

Preceded by 1934 French Championships	Grand Slams; Women's Singles	Succeeded by 1934 U.S. National Championships
