= 1936 Wightman Cup =

International women's tennis competition

Details
- Edition: 14th

Champion
- Winning nation: United States

The 1936 Wightman Cup was the 14th edition of the annual women's team tennis competition between the United States and Great Britain. The event was held at the All England Lawn Tennis and Croquet Club in London, United Kingdom.

Great Britain
3
All England Lawn Tennis and Croquet Club, London, England, United Kingdom
1936
Grass

United States
4

			1	2	3
1	(United Kingdom) (United States)	Kay Stammers; Helen Jacobs	12; 10	6; 1
2	(United Kingdom) (United States)	Dorothy Round; Sarah Palfrey Fabyan	6; 4	6; 3
3	(United Kingdom) (United States)	Kay Stammers; Sarah Palfrey Fabyan	3; 6	4; 6
4	(United Kingdom) (United States)	Dorothy Round; Helen Jacobs	6; 3	6; 3
5	(United Kingdom) (United States)	Mary Hardwick; Carolin Babcock	4; 6	6; 4	2; 6
6	(United Kingdom) (United States)	Nancy Lyle / Evelyn Dearman; Carolin Babcock / Marjorie Gladman Van Ryn	2; 6	6; 1	3; 6
7	(United Kingdom) (United States)	Kay Stammers / Freda James; Helen Jacobs / Sarah Palfrey Fabyan	6; 1	3; 6	5; 7
