= 1934 U.S. National Championships (tennis) =

- Date: September 1–12 (M); August 13–18 (W)
- Edition: 54th
- Category: Grand Slam (ITF)
- Surface: Grass / Outdoor
- Location: Forest Hills, Queens; New York City, New York
- Venue: West Side Tennis Club

Champions

Men's singles
- (United Kingdom) Fred Perry

Women's singles
- (United States) Helen Jacobs

Men's doubles
- (United States) George Lott / (United States) Lester Stoefen

Women's doubles
- (United States) Helen Jacobs / (United States) Sarah Palfrey Cooke

Mixed doubles
- (United States) Helen Jacobs / (United States) George Lott
← 1933 ·	U.S. National Championships	· 1935 →

The 1934 U.S. National Championships (now known as the US Open) was a tennis tournament that took place on the outdoor grass courts at the West Side Tennis Club, Forest Hills in New York City, New York. The tournament ran from September 1 until September 12. It was the 54th staging of the U.S. National Championships and the fourth Grand Slam tennis event of the year. The men's and women's doubles events were held in Longwood Cricket Club in Chestnut Hill, Massachusetts.

== Finals ==
=== Men's singles ===
(United Kingdom) Fred Perry defeated (United States) Wilmer Allison 6–4, 6–3, 1–6, 8–6

=== Women's singles ===
(United States) Helen Jacobs defeated (United States) Sarah Palfrey Cooke 6–1, 6–3

=== Men's doubles ===
(United States) George Lott / (United States) Lester Stoefen defeated (United States) Wilmer Allison / (United States) John Van Ryn 6–4, 9–7, 3–6, 6–4

=== Women's doubles ===
(United States) Helen Jacobs / (United States) Sarah Palfrey Cooke defeated (United States) Carolin Babcock / (United States) Dorothy Andrus 4–6, 6–3, 6–4

=== Mixed doubles ===
(United States) Helen Jacobs / (United States) George Lott defeated (United States) Elizabeth Ryan / (United States) Lester Stoefen 4–6, 13–11, 6–2

Preceded by 1934 Wimbledon Championships	Grand Slams	Succeeded by 1935 Australian Championships
