= 1933 U.S. National Championships – Women's singles =

Women's singles
- 1933 U.S. National Championships

Final
- Champion: (United States) Helen Jacobs
- Runner-up: (United States) Helen Wills Moody
- Score: 8–6, 3–6, 3–0 ret.

Details
- Draw: 64
- Seeds: 12

Events
Singles	men	women
Doubles	men	women
- U.S. National Championships

Second-seeded Helen Jacobs defeated first-seeded Helen Wills Moody 8–6, 3–6, 3–0 ret. in the final to win the 'Women's Singles tennis title at the 1933 U.S. National Championships at the Forest Hills Tennis Stadium in Queens. At 0–3 in the final set Wills Moody retired citing a back injury. The loss ended Wills Moody's 45-match winning streak at the U.S. Championships. The final was played on August 26, 1933, in front of a crowd of 8,000 spectators.

== Seeds ==
The tournament used two lists of six players for seeding the women's singles event; one for U.S. players and one for foreign players. Helen Jacobs is the champion; others show in brackets the round in which they were eliminated.

1. (United States) Helen Wills Moody (finalist, retired)
2. (United States) Helen Jacobs (champion)
3. (United States) Alice Marble (quarterfinals)
4. (United States) Sarah Palfrey (quarterfinals)
5. (United States) Carolin Babcock ()
6. (United States) Josephine Cruickshank (quarterfinals)
1. (United Kingdom) Dorothy Round (semifinals)
2. (United Kingdom) Betty Nuthall (semifinals)
3. (United Kingdom) Mary Heeley (quarterfinals)
4. (United Kingdom) Peggy Scriven ()
5. (United Kingdom) Joan Ridley ()
6. (United Kingdom) Freda James ()

== Draw ==
=== Final eight ===
Quarterfinals
1	(United States) Helen Wills Moody	6	6
(3)	(United Kingdom) Mary Heeley	0	2
3	(United States) Alice Marble	8	0	5
(2)	(United Kingdom) Betty Nuthall	6	6	7
2	(United States) Helen Jacobs	11	6
6	(United States) Josephine Cruickshank	9	4
4	(United States) Sarah Palfrey	4	7
(1)	(United Kingdom) Dorothy Round	6	9

Semifinals
1	(United States) Helen Wills Moody	2	6	6
(2)	(United Kingdom) Betty Nuthall	6	3	2
2	(United States) Helen Jacobs	6	5	6
(1)	(United Kingdom) Dorothy Round	4	7	2

Finals
1	(United States) Helen Wills Moody	6	6	0^{r}
2	(United States) Helen Jacobs	8	3	3

Preceded by 1933 Wimbledon Championships – Women's singles	Grand Slam women's singles	Succeeded by 1934 Australian Championships – Women's singles
