= 1934 Wimbledon Championships – Men's doubles =

Men's doubles
- 1934 Wimbledon Championships

Final
- Champions: (United States) George Lott (United States) Lester Stoefen
- Runners-up: (France) Jean Borotra (France) Jacques Brugnon
- Score: 6–2, 6–3, 6–4

Details
- Draw: 64 (5Q)
- Seeds: 4

Events
Singles	men	women		boys	girls
Doubles	men	women	mixed	boys	girls
- Wimbledon Championships

George Lott and Lester Stoefen defeated the defending champions Jean Borotra and Jacques Brugnon in the final, 6–2, 6–3, 6–4 to win the gentlemen's doubles tennis title at the 1934 Wimbledon Championship.

== Seeds ==
1. (France) Jean Borotra / (France) Jacques Brugnon (final)
2. (United States) George Lott / (United States) Lester Stoefen (champions)
3. (United Kingdom) Pat Hughes / (United Kingdom) Fred Perry (second round)
4. (Australia) Jack Crawford / (Australia) Adrian Quist (second round)

Click on the seed number of a player to go to their draw section.

== Draw ==
Key

- Q = Qualifier
- WC = Wild card
- LL = Lucky loser
- Alt = Alternate
- ITF = ITF entry
- PR = Protected ranking
- SR = Special ranking
- SE = Special exempt
- JE = Junior exempt
- JR = Junior Accelerator Programme entrant
- CO = College Accelerator Programme entrant
- NG = Next Gen Accelerator Program entrant
- w/o = Walkover
- r = Retired
- d = Defaulted

=== Finals ===
Quarterfinals
2	(United States) George Lott (United States) Lester Stoefen	6	13	6
(Germany) Hans Denker (Germany) Henner Henkel	1	11	1
(Australia) Harry Hopman (Germany) Daniel Prenn	4	10	6	6
(Australia) Vivian McGrath (Australia) Don Turnbull	6	8	4	4
1	(France) Jean Borotra (France) Jacques Brugnon	8	6	6
(United States) R. Norris Williams (United States) Sidney Wood	6	2	3
(South Africa) Vernon Kirby (Japan) Ryuki Miki	2	5	2
(United Kingdom) Ian Collins (United Kingdom) Frank Wilde	6	7	6

Semifinals
2	(United States) George Lott (United States) Lester Stoefen	6	4	6	8
(Australia) Harry Hopman (Germany) Daniel Prenn	4	6	3	6
1	(France) Jean Borotra (France) Jacques Brugnon	7	3	6	6
(United Kingdom) Ian Collins (United Kingdom) Frank Wilde	5	6	2	4

Final
2	(United States) George Lott (United States) Lester Stoefen	6	6	6
1	(France) Jean Borotra (France) Jacques Brugnon	2	3	4

=== Top half ===
==== Section 1 ====
First round
2	(United States) George Lott (United States) Lester Stoefen	6	6	4	6
(United Kingdom) Bob Tinkler (United Kingdom) Raymond Tuckey	4	2	6	2
(United Kingdom) Jock Findlay (United Kingdom) Jimmy Reddall	3	5	2
(Czechoslovakia) Ladislav Hecht (Czechoslovakia) Roderich Menzel	6	7	6
(France) Jean Lesueur (France) André Martin-Legeay
(United States) Henry Culley (United States) Wilmer Hines	w/o
(United Kingdom) Kenneth Gandar-Dower (New Zealand) Cam Malfroy	3	6	6	12	6
(Japan) Iwao Aoki (Japan) Jiro Fujikura	6	3	0	14	3
(Belgium) Léopold de Borman (Belgium) André Lacroix	14	5	6	7	10
(Germany) Hans Denker (Germany) Henner Henkel	16	7	4	5	12
(United Kingdom) John Olliff (United Kingdom) Laddie Wheatcroft	7	4	6	6
(United Kingdom) George Gibbs (United Kingdom) Bill Latham	5	6	0	2
(United Kingdom) Herman David (South Africa) Pat Spence
(Switzerland) Charles Aeschlimann (Switzerland) Hector Fisher	w/o
(United Kingdom) Wilfred Freeman (Netherlands) DP van Meurs	2	0	6
(United Kingdom) Guy Cooper (Spain) Enrique Maier	6	6	6

Second round
2	(United States) G Lott (United States) L Stoefen
(Czechoslovakia) L Hecht (Czechoslovakia) R Menzel	w/o
(France) J Lesueur (France) A Martin-Legeay	2	6	7	4
(United Kingdom) K Gandar-Dower (New Zealand) C Malfroy	6	4	9	6
(Germany) H Denker (Germany) H Henkel	6	6	11	5	6
(United Kingdom) J Olliff (United Kingdom) I Wheatcroft	8	4	9	7	4
(United Kingdom) H David (South Africa) P Spence	2	3	2
(United Kingdom) G Cooper (Spain) E Maier	6	6	6

Third round
2	(United States) G Lott (United States) L Stoefen	6	6	6	6
(United Kingdom) K Gandar-Dower (New Zealand) C Malfroy	4	4	8	4
(Germany) H Denker (Germany) H Henkel
(United Kingdom) G Cooper (Spain) E Maier	w/o

Quarterfinals
2	(United States) G Lott (United States) L Stoefen	6	13	6
(Germany) H Denker (Germany) H Henkel	1	11	1

==== Section 2 ====
First round
3	(United Kingdom) Pat Hughes (United Kingdom) Fred Perry	6	6	6
Q	(United Kingdom) JDF Fisher (United Kingdom) Ronald MacInnes	2	0	4
(Australia) Harry Hopman (Germany) Daniel Prenn	6	6	6
Q	(United Kingdom) Brian Gilbert (United Kingdom) Harry Lewis-Barclay	3	4	1
(United States) Teddy Burwell (United States) David Jones
(Egypt) Pierre Grandguillot (France) Pierre Henri Landry	w/o
(United Kingdom) Jimmy Hunt (United Kingdom) Colin Ritchie	6	3	6	6
(United Kingdom) Alan Brown (United Kingdom) Lewis Michell	2	6	3	3
(Netherlands) Josef Knottenbelt (Netherlands) Gerard Leembruggen	4	0	2
(United Kingdom) Nigel Sharpe (United States) Frank Shields	6	6	6
(United Kingdom) John Collins (United Kingdom) Grady Frank	11	6	6
Q	(United Kingdom) Teddy Higgs (United Kingdom) Richard Turnbull	9	4	1
(New Zealand) Buster Andrews (New Zealand) Alan Stedman
(Italy) Alberto del Bono (Italy) Emanuele Sertorio	w/o
(Australia) Vivian McGrath (Australia) Don Turnbull	6	6	6
(United Kingdom) Jack Hillyard (Monaco) Vladimir Landau	1	3	4

Second round
3	(United Kingdom) P Hughes (United Kingdom) F Perry	4	6	2	4
(Australia) H Hopman (Germany) D Prenn	6	3	6	6
(United States) T Burwell (United States) D Jones	7	6	9
(United Kingdom) J Hunt (United Kingdom) C Ritchie	5	2	7
(United Kingdom) N Sharpe (United States) F Shields	4	6	6	6
(United Kingdom) J Collins (United Kingdom) G Frank	6	2	3	2
(New Zealand) E Andrews (New Zealand) A Stedman	6	2	6	1
(Australia) V McGrath (Australia) D Turnbull	9	6	0	6

Third round
(Australia) H Hopman (Germany) D Prenn	11	9	6
(United States) T Burwell (United States) D Jones	9	7	2
(United Kingdom) N Sharpe (United States) F Shields	3	4	4
(Australia) V McGrath (Australia) D Turnbull	6	6	6

Quarterfinals
(Australia) H Hopman (Germany) D Prenn	4	10	6	6
(Australia) V McGrath (Australia) D Turnbull	6	8	4	4

=== Bottom half ===
==== Section 3 ====
First round
1	(France) Jean Borotra (France) Jacques Brugnon	3	6	8	6
(France) Marcel Bernard (France) André Merlin	6	1	6	3
(United Kingdom) Jack Lysaght (United Kingdom) Donald MacPhail	6	10	6
(United Kingdom) Eric Attewell (United Kingdom) Henry Burrows	4	8	0
Q	(United Kingdom) Brian Sturgeon (United Kingdom) Norman Taylor	2	3	3
(United Kingdom) Charles Kingsley (United Kingdom) Gwyn Tuckett	6	6	6
(Poland) Józef Hebda (Poland) Ignacy Tłoczyński	w/o
(Belgium) Pierre Geelhand de Merxem (Belgium) Jack Van den Eynde
(United Kingdom) Billy Collins (United Kingdom) Edward Dearman	6	6	2	5
(United Kingdom) Claude Metcalf (United Kingdom) Arthur Vinall	8	1	6	7
(Austria) Hermann Artens (Austria) Georg von Metaxa	6	6	6	9
(Sweden) Curt Östberg (Sweden) Karl Schröder	4	3	8	7
(Czechoslovakia) Friedrich Rohrer (Czechoslovakia) Josef Šíba	w/o
(United Kingdom) Colin Higgins (United Kingdom) Adam Hulton
(Japan) Hideo Nishimura (Japan) Jiro Yamagishi	6	6	2	2	3
(United States) R. Norris Williams (United States) Sidney Wood	4	2	6	6	6

Second round
1	(France) J Borotra (France) J Brugnon	6	6	6
(United Kingdom) J Lysaght (United Kingdom) D MacPhail	2	1	2
(United Kingdom) C Kingsley (United Kingdom) G Tuckett	6	6	6
(Belgium) P Geelhand de Merxem (Belgium) J Van den Eynde	4	4	2
(United Kingdom) C Metcalf (United Kingdom) A Vinall	1	4	4
(Austria) H Artens (Austria) G von Metaxa	6	6	6
(United Kingdom) C Higgins (United Kingdom) A Hulton	3	3	3
(United States) RN Williams (United States) S Wood	6	6	6

Third round
1	(France) J Borotra (France) J Brugnon	6	4	6	6
(United Kingdom) C Kingsley (United Kingdom) G Tuckett	1	6	0	1
(Austria) H Artens (Austria) G von Metaxa	7	6	4	1
(United States) RN Williams (United States) S Wood	9	2	6	6

Quarterfinals
1	(France) J Borotra (France) J Brugnon	8	6	6
(United States) RN Williams (United States) S Wood	6	2	3

==== Section 4 ====
First round
4	(Australia) Jack Crawford (Australia) Adrian Quist
(United Kingdom) Cyril Fletcher (United Kingdom) John Fletcher	w/o
(South Africa) Vernon Kirby (Japan) Ryuki Miki	5	6	6	5	6
(United Kingdom) Charles Hare (United Kingdom) Keats Lester	7	1	3	7	1
(Netherlands) Ody Koopman (Netherlands) Hendrik Timmer	6	7	6	6
(Denmark) Fritz Gleerup (Denmark) Anker Jacobsen	4	9	2	2
(Hungary) Emil Gábori (Hungary) Béla von Kehrling	6	4	10	6
(United Kingdom) Laurie Shaffi (India) Mohammed Sleem	3	6	8	4
(Germany) Heinrich Kleinschroth (Germany) Werner Menzel	1	4	4
(United States) Bill Breese (Australia) Joseph Clynton-Reed	6	6	6
Q	(United Kingdom) JC Hudson (United Kingdom) Gerald King	0	2	3
(United Kingdom) Harry Lee (United Kingdom) Eric Peters	6	6	6
(France) Christian Boussus (France) Antoine Gentien	3	2	8	7	6
(United Kingdom) Ted Avory (United Kingdom) Dickie Ritchie	6	6	6	5	3
(United Kingdom) Stanley Grossmith (United Kingdom) W Pyemont	1	12	3
(United Kingdom) Ian Collins (United Kingdom) Frank Wilde	6	14	6

Second round
(Australia) J Crawford (Australia) A Quist	6	4	3	6
(South Africa) V Kirby (Japan) T Miki	4	6	6	8
(Netherlands) O Koopman (Netherlands) H Timmer	4	6	6	9
(Hungary) E Gábori (Hungary) B von Kehrling	6	4	2	7
(United States) W Breese (Australia) J Clynton-Reed	10	5	9	10
(United Kingdom) H Lee (United Kingdom) E Peters	8	7	7	8
(France) C Boussus (France) A Gentien	1	6	4	1
(United Kingdom) I Collins (United Kingdom) F Wilde	6	3	6	6

Third round
(South Africa) V Kirby (Japan) T Miki	6	8	6
(Netherlands) O Koopman (Netherlands) H Timmer	1	6	0
(United States) W Breese (Australia) J Clynton-Reed	7	1	3	6	2
(United Kingdom) I Collins (United Kingdom) F Wilde	5	6	6	4	6

Quarterfinals
(South Africa) V Kirby (Japan) T Miki	2	5	2
(United Kingdom) I Collins (United Kingdom) F Wilde	6	7	6
