= 1933 U.S. National Championships (tennis) =

- Date: September 2–10 (M); August 14–19 (W)
- Edition: 53rd
- Category: Grand Slam (ITF)
- Surface: Grass / Outdoor
- Location: Forest Hills, Queens; New York City, New York
- Venue: West Side Tennis Club

Champions

Men's singles
- (United Kingdom) Fred Perry

Women's singles
- (United States) Helen Jacobs

Men's doubles
- (United States) George Lott / (United States) Lester Stoefen

Women's doubles
- (United Kingdom) Betty Nuthall / (United Kingdom) Freda James

Mixed doubles
- (United States) Elizabeth Ryan / (United States) Ellsworth Vines
- U.S. National Championships

The 1933 U.S. National Championships (now known as the US Open) was a tennis tournament that took place on the outdoor grass courts at the West Side Tennis Club, Forest Hills in New York City. The tournament ran from September 2 through September 10 for the men's tournament and August 14 through August 19 for the women's tournament. It was the 53rd staging of the U.S. National Championships and the fourth Grand Slam tennis event of the year.

Earlier in the year Jack Crawford had won the Australian Championships, the French Championships and the Wimbledon title, but his defeat in the finals against Fred Perry did not let him become the first tennis player to win the Grand Slam. This honor would go to Don Budge who won all four Grand Slam tournaments in 1938.

Helen Wills Moody's retirement in the finals to Helen Jacobs was her first loss at a Grand Slam tournament since Kitty McKane defeated her in the final of the 1924 Wimbledon Championships.

== Finals ==
=== Men's singles ===
(United Kingdom) Fred Perry defeated (Australia) Jack Crawford 6–3, 11–13, 4–6, 6–0, 6–1

=== Women's singles ===
(United States) Helen Jacobs defeated (United States) Helen Wills Moody 8–6, 3–6, 3–0, ret.

=== Men's doubles ===
(United States) George Lott / (United States) Lester Stoefen defeated (United States) Frank Shields / (United States) Frank Parker 11–13, 9–7, 9–7, 6–3

=== Women's doubles ===
(United Kingdom) Betty Nuthall / (United Kingdom) Freda James defeated (United States) Helen Wills Moody / (United States) Elizabeth Ryan default

=== Mixed doubles ===
(United States) Elizabeth Ryan / (United States) Ellsworth Vines defeated (United States) Sarah Palfrey / (United States) George Lott 11–9, 6–1

Preceded by 1933 Wimbledon Championships	Grand Slams	Succeeded by 1934 Australian Championships
