= 1936 Wimbledon Championships – Men's doubles =

Men's doubles
- 1936 Wimbledon Championships

Final
- Champions: (United Kingdom) Pat Hughes (United Kingdom) Raymond Tuckey
- Runners-up: (United Kingdom) Charles Hare (United Kingdom) Frank Wilde
- Score: 6–4, 3–6, 7–9, 6–1, 6–4

Details
- Draw: 64 (5Q)
- Seeds: 4

Events
Singles	men	women		boys	girls
Doubles	men	women	mixed	boys	girls
- Wimbledon Championships

Jack Crawford and Adrian Quist were the defending champions, but lost in the third round to Jean Borotra and Jacques Brugnon.

Pat Hughes and Raymond Tuckey defeated Charles Hare and Frank Wilde in the final, 6–4, 3–6, 7–9, 6–1, 6–4 to win the gentlemen's doubles tennis title at the 1936 Wimbledon Championship.

== Seeds ==
1. (Australia) Jack Crawford / (Australia) Adrian Quist (third round)
2. (United States) Wilmer Allison / (United States) John Van Ryn (semifinals)
3. (United States) Don Budge / (United States) Gene Mako (third round)
4. (United Kingdom) Pat Hughes / (United Kingdom) Raymond Tuckey (champions)

Click on the seed number of a player to go to their draw section.

== Draw ==
Key

- Q = Qualifier
- WC = Wild card
- LL = Lucky loser
- Alt = Alternate
- ITF = ITF entry
- PR = Protected ranking
- SR = Special ranking
- SE = Special exempt
- JE = Junior exempt
- JR = Junior Accelerator Programme entrant
- CO = College Accelerator Programme entrant
- NG = Next Gen Accelerator Program entrant
- w/o = Walkover
- r = Retired
- d = Defaulted

=== Finals ===
Quarterfinals
(France) Jean Borotra (France) Jacques Brugnon	6	6	5	6
(United States) Merrimon Cuninggim (Japan) Eikishi Ito	2	5	7	2
(United Kingdom) Jimmy Jones (United Kingdom) Ronnie Shayes	2	2	5
(United Kingdom) Charles Hare (United Kingdom) Frank Wilde	6	6	7
(New Zealand) Cam Malfroy (New Zealand) Alan Stedman	1	1	6	0
4	(United Kingdom) Pat Hughes (United Kingdom) Raymond Tuckey	6	6	3	6
(Australia) Vivian McGrath (Australia) Clifford Sproule	4	3	4
2	(United States) Wilmer Allison (United States) John Van Ryn	6	6	6

Semifinals
(France) Jean Borotra (France) Jacques Brugnon	1	6	1	4
(United Kingdom) Charles Hare (United Kingdom) Frank Wilde	6	4	6	6
4	(United Kingdom) Pat Hughes (United Kingdom) Raymond Tuckey	7	6	3	11
2	(United States) Wilmer Allison (United States) John Van Ryn	5	4	6	9

Final
(United Kingdom) Charles Hare (United Kingdom) Frank Wilde	4	6	9	1	4
4	(United Kingdom) Pat Hughes (United Kingdom) Raymond Tuckey	6	3	7	6	6

=== Top half ===
==== Section 1 ====
First round
1	(Australia) Jack Crawford (Australia) Adrian Quist	6	6	7
(Czechoslovakia) Josef Caska (Czechoslovakia) Ladislav Hecht	3	3	5
(Republic of China (1912–1949)) Kho Sin-Kie (Republic of China (1912–1949)) Lum Pao-Hua	6	6	6
(United Kingdom) George Godsell (Republic of Ireland) Henry Purcell	3	4	0
(United Kingdom) Charles Kingsley (United Kingdom) Jack Lysaght	2	2	6	4
(Switzerland) Hector Fisher (Kingdom of Yugoslavia) Franjo Kukuljević	6	6	2	6
(France) Jean Borotra (France) Jacques Brugnon	6	6	6
Q	(United Kingdom) Claude Lister (United Kingdom) Norman Taylor	3	2	2
(United Kingdom) Guy Cooper (United Kingdom) Bob Tinkler	6	6	6
(United States) Bill Breese; AW Patterson	2	1	3
(United States) David Jones (Germany) Daniel Prenn	6	6	6
(United Kingdom) Dennis Cook (United Kingdom) Eric Filby	4	2	2
(United Kingdom) Jimmy Hunt (United Kingdom) Colin Ritchie	4	4	2
(United Kingdom) Ian Collins (United States) Hal Surface	6	6	6
(United States) Merrimon Cuninggim (Japan) Eikishi Ito	6	6	6
(Belgium) Léopold de Borman (Belgium) Jack Van den Eynde	1	3	4

Second round
1	(Australia) J Crawford (Australia) A Quist	6	6	6
(Republic of China (1912–1949)) S-K Kho (Republic of China (1912–1949)) P-H Lum	1	2	4
(Switzerland) H Fisher (Kingdom of Yugoslavia) F Kukuljević	2	5	13
(France) J Borotra (France) J Brugnon	6	7	15
(United Kingdom) G Cooper (United Kingdom) R Tinkler	6	6	6	6
(United States) D Jones (Germany) D Prenn	8	4	3	4
(United Kingdom) I Collins (United States) H Surface	6	2	6	3	4
(United States) M Cuninggim (Japan) E Ito	4	6	4	6	6

Third round
1	(Australia) J Crawford (Australia) A Quist	6	5	6	7	2
(France) J Borotra (France) J Brugnon	3	7	2	9	6
(United Kingdom) G Cooper (United Kingdom) R Tinkler	4	6	3	6	4
(United States) M Cuninggim (Japan) E Ito	6	4	6	0	6

Quarterfinals
(France) J Borotra (France) J Brugnon	6	6	5	6
(United States) M Cuninggim (Japan) E Ito	2	5	7	2

The nationality of AW Patterson is unknown.

==== Section 2 ====
First round
3	(United States) Don Budge (United States) Gene Mako	6	13	6
(France) Christian Boussus (France) Bernard Destremau	3	11	4
(United Kingdom) Donald MacPhail (United Kingdom) Pat Sherwood	6	6	6
Q	(United Kingdom) Gerald King (United Kingdom) Bill Latham	2	0	2
(Germany) Heinrich Kleinschroth (United Kingdom) Nigel Sharpe	2	0	2
(United Kingdom) Jimmy Jones (United Kingdom) Ronnie Shayes	6	6	6
(Argentina) Lucilo del Castillo (Argentina) Adriano Zappa	6	6	6
Q	(United Kingdom) Jack Antrobus (United Kingdom) Stanley Stewart	3	4	4
(Netherlands) Josef Knottenbelt (Netherlands) Hendrik Timmer	4	6	7
(United Kingdom) Henry Billington (United Kingdom) Bobby Meredith	6	8	9
(United Kingdom) Eric Attewell (United Kingdom) Jack Harrison	5	4	3
(United Kingdom) Charles Hare (United Kingdom) Frank Wilde	7	6	6
(Germany) Kay Lund (Spain) Enrique Maier	6	6	4	6
(United Kingdom) John Leader (Republic of Ireland) George McVeagh	1	3	6	3
(New Zealand) Buster Andrews (United Kingdom) Eric Peters	3	2	6	2
(Austria) Adam Baworowski (Austria) Georg von Metaxa	6	6	4	6

Second round
3	(United States) D Budge (United States) G Mako	6	8	7
(United Kingdom) D MacPhail (United Kingdom) P Sherwood	4	6	5
(United Kingdom) C Jones (United Kingdom) R Shayes
(Argentina) L del Castillo (Argentina) A Zappa	w/o
(United Kingdom) H Billington (United Kingdom) G Meredith	4	2	3
(United Kingdom) C Hare (United Kingdom) F Wilde	6	6	6
(Germany) K Lund (Spain) E Maier	7	4	6	6
(Austria) A Baworowski (Austria) G von Metaxa	5	6	3	4

Third round
3	(United States) D Budge (United States) G Mako	w/o
(United Kingdom) C Jones (United Kingdom) R Shayes
(United Kingdom) C Hare (United Kingdom) F Wilde	6	7	6
(Germany) K Lund (Spain) E Maier	4	5	4

Quarterfinals
(United Kingdom) C Jones (United Kingdom) R Shayes	2	2	5
(United Kingdom) C Hare (United Kingdom) F Wilde	6	6	7

=== Bottom half ===
==== Section 3 ====
First round
(United Kingdom) Kenneth Gandar-Dower (United Kingdom) Laddie Wheatcroft	6	6	6
(Republic of China (1912–1949)) Choy Wai-Chuen (Republic of China (1912–1949)) Ho Jin	4	3	3
(United Kingdom) Murray Deloford (United Kingdom) Richard Turnbull	11	6	8	3	6
(United Kingdom) Wilfred Freeman (United Kingdom) Harvey Hillier	9	8	6	6	3
(United Kingdom) Don Butler (United Kingdom) Dickie Ritchie	6	6	6
(Canada) Robert Murray (Canada) Laird Watt	2	0	1
(United Kingdom) Ted Avory (United Kingdom) Harry Lee	3	5	2
(New Zealand) Cam Malfroy (New Zealand) Alan Stedman	6	7	6
Q	(United Kingdom) Cliff Hovell (United Kingdom) John Wright	1	2	3
(United States) Bryan Grant (United States) Gerry Stratford	6	6	6
(Netherlands) Tod Hughan (Netherlands) Hans van Swol	6	6	6
(United States) Bill Robertson (Czechoslovakia) Josef Šíba	4	1	1
(Greece) Georgios Nikolaides (Greece) Lazaros Stalios
(France) Antoine Gentien (France) Pierre Henri Landry	w/o
(Norway) Johan Haanes (Norway) Fritz Jenssen	4	2	0
4	(United Kingdom) Pat Hughes (United Kingdom) Raymond Tuckey	6	6	6

Second round
(United Kingdom) K Gandar-Dower (United Kingdom) I Wheatcroft	6	6	12
(United Kingdom) M Deloford (United Kingdom) R Turnbull	0	1	10
(United Kingdom) D Butler (United Kingdom) R Ritchie	7	1	5	4
(New Zealand) C Malfroy (New Zealand) A Stedman	5	6	7	6
(United States) B Grant (United States) G Stratford	4	6	6	5	9
(Netherlands) T Hughan (Netherlands) A van Swol	6	4	3	7	7
(Greece) G Nikolaides (Greece) L Stalios	2	1	3
4	(United Kingdom) P Hughes (United Kingdom) R Tuckey	6	6	6

Third round
(United Kingdom) K Gandar-Dower (United Kingdom) I Wheatcroft	1	4	3
(New Zealand) C Malfroy (New Zealand) A Stedman	6	6	6
(United States) B Grant (United States) G Stratford	5	8	2	5
4	(United Kingdom) P Hughes (United Kingdom) R Tuckey	7	6	6	7

Quarterfinals
(New Zealand) C Malfroy (New Zealand) A Stedman	1	1	6	0
4	(United Kingdom) P Hughes (United Kingdom) R Tuckey	6	6	3	6

==== Section 4 ====
First round
(United Kingdom) Freddie Della Porta (United Kingdom) Leslie Walter	6	2	4	4
(Switzerland) Charles Aeschlimann (Switzerland) Max Ellmer	3	6	6	6
(United Kingdom) John Olliff (South Africa) Pat Spence	3	7	2	6	2
(Australia) Vivian McGrath (Australia) Cliff Sproule	6	5	6	1	6
(France) Jean Lesueur (France) André Martin-Legeay	7	6	6	6
(United Kingdom) Jock Findlay (United Kingdom) Jimmy Reddall	9	3	1	3
(United Kingdom) Edmund David (United Kingdom) Herman David	4	7	6	3	6
(Switzerland) Boris Maneff (Denmark) Helge Plougmann	6	5	2	6	4
(United Kingdom) John Anderson (United Kingdom) John Collins	0	4	2
(Germany) Gottfried von Cramm (Germany) Henner Henkel	6	6	6
(Poland) Józef Hebda (France) Jacques Jamain	3	6	4	4
(United Kingdom) Stan Clark (United Kingdom) Bill Manby	6	2	6	6
Q	(United Kingdom) Ralph Nichols (United Kingdom) David Williams	0	4	1
(France) Pierre Pellizza (France) Yvon Petra	6	6	6
(Hungary) Emil Gábori (Austria) Richard von Planner	2	3	2
2	(United States) Wilmer Allison (United States) John Van Ryn	6	6	6

Second round
(Switzerland) C Aeschlimann (Switzerland) M Ellmer	2	6	3	1
(Australia) V McGrath (Australia) C Sproule	6	4	6	6
(France) J Lesueur (France) A Martin-Legeay	6	3	6	4	6
(United Kingdom) E David (United Kingdom) H David	4	6	4	6	2
(Germany) G von Cramm (Germany) H Henkel	6	6	7
(United Kingdom) S Clark (United Kingdom) N Manby	0	2	5
(France) P Pellizza (France) Y Petra	1	5	3
2	(United States) W Allison (United States) J Van Ryn	6	7	6

Third round
(Australia) V McGrath (Australia) C Sproule	6	8	4	1	7
(France) J Lesueur (France) A Martin-Legeay	4	6	6	6	5
(Germany) G von Cramm (Germany) H Henkel	6	8	4	6	5^{r}
2	(United States) W Allison (United States) J Van Ryn	4	10	6	3	4

Quarterfinals
(Australia) V McGrath (Australia) C Sproule	4	3	4
2	(United States) W Allison (United States) J Van Ryn	6	6	6
