= 1935 U.S. National Championships (tennis) =

- Date: August 29 – September 12
- Edition: 55th
- Category: Grand Slam (ITF)
- Surface: Grass / outdoor
- Location: Forest Hills, Queens; New York City, New York
- Venue: West Side Tennis Club

Champions

Men's singles
- (United States) Wilmer Allison

Women's singles
- (United States) Helen Jacobs

Men's doubles
- (United States) Wilmer Allison / (United States) John Van Ryn

Women's doubles
- (United States) Helen Jacobs / (United States) Sarah Palfrey Cooke

Mixed doubles
- (United States) Sarah Palfrey Cooke / (Spain) Enrique Maier
← 1934 ·	U.S. National Championships	· 1936 →

The 1935 U.S. National Championships (now known as the US Open) was a tennis tournament that took place on the outdoor grass courts at the West Side Tennis Club, Forest Hills in New York City, New York. The tournament ran from August 29 until September 12. It was the 55th staging of the U.S. National Championships and the fourth Grand Slam tennis event of the year.

== Finals ==
=== Men's singles ===
(United States) Wilmer Allison defeated (United States) Sidney Wood 6–2, 6–2, 6–3

=== Women's singles ===
(United States) Helen Jacobs defeated (United States) Sarah Palfrey Cooke 6–2, 6–4

=== Men's doubles ===
(United States) Wilmer Allison / (United States) John Van Ryn defeated (United States) Don Budge / (United States) Gene Mako 6–2, 6–3, 2–6, 3–6, 6–1

=== Women's doubles ===
(United States) Helen Jacobs / (United States) Sarah Palfrey Cooke defeated (United States) Carolin Babcock / (United States) Dorothy Andrus 6–4, 6–2

=== Mixed doubles ===
(United States) Sarah Palfrey Cooke / (Spain) Enrique Maier defeated (United Kingdom) Kay Stammers / (Czechoslovakia) Roderich Menzel 6–4, 4–6, 6–3

Preceded by 1935 Wimbledon Championships	Grand Slams	Succeeded by 1936 Australian Championships
