= 1936 Wimbledon Championships =

- Date: 22 June – 4 July
- Edition: 56th
- Category: Grand Slam
- Surface: Grass
- Location: Church Road; SW19, Wimbledon, London, United Kingdom
- Venue: All England Lawn Tennis and Croquet Club

Champions

Men's singles
- (United Kingdom) Fred Perry

Women's singles
- (United States) Helen Jacobs

Men's doubles
- (United Kingdom) Pat Hughes / (United Kingdom) Raymond Tuckey

Women's doubles
- (United Kingdom) Freda James / (United Kingdom) Kay Stammers

Mixed doubles
- (United Kingdom) Fred Perry / (United Kingdom) Dorothy Round
← 1935 ·	Wimbledon Championships	· 1937 →

The 1936 Wimbledon Championships took place on the outdoor grass courts at the All England Lawn Tennis and Croquet Club in Wimbledon, London, United Kingdom. The tournament was held from Monday 22 June until Saturday 4 July 1936. It was the 56th edition of the Wimbledon Championships, and the third Grand Slam of Year. Fred Perry and Helen Jacobs won the gentlemen's and ladies' singles titles.

This was the first and only Wimbledon tournament during the reign of King Edward VIII.

== Finals ==
=== Men's singles ===
(United Kingdom) Fred Perry defeated (Germany) Gottfried von Cramm, 6–1, 6–1, 6–0

=== Women's singles ===
(United States) Helen Jacobs defeated (Denmark) Hilde Sperling, 6–2, 4–6, 7–5

=== Men's doubles ===
(United Kingdom) Pat Hughes / (United Kingdom) Raymond Tuckey defeated (United Kingdom) Charles Hare / (United Kingdom) Frank Wilde, 6–4, 3–6, 7–9, 6–1, 6–4

=== Women's doubles ===
(United Kingdom) Freda James / (United Kingdom) Kay Stammers defeated (United States) Sarah Fabyan / (United States) Helen Jacobs, 6–2, 6–1

=== Mixed doubles ===
(United Kingdom) Fred Perry / (United Kingdom) Dorothy Round defeated (United States) Don Budge / (United States) Sarah Fabyan, 7–9, 7–5, 6–4

Preceded by 1936 French Championships	Grand Slams	Succeeded by 1936 U.S. National Championships
