= 1935 U.S. National Championships – Women's singles =

Women's singles
- 1935 U.S. National Championships

Final
- Champion: (United States) Helen Jacobs
- Runner-up: (United States) Sarah Fabyan
- Score: 6–2, 6–4

Details
- Draw: 64
- Seeds: 7

Events
Singles	men	women
Doubles	men	women
- U.S. National Championships

First-seeded Helen Jacobs defeated second-seeded Sarah Fabyan 6–2, 6–4 in the final to win the women's singles tennis title at the 1935 U.S. National Championships. The tournament was played on outdoor grass courts and held from August 29, through September 12, 1935 at the West Side Tennis Club in Forest Hills, Queens, New York. The tournament was completed late due to rain. Jacobs won the tournament without losing a set.

The draw consisted of 64 players of which seven were seeded.

== Seeds ==
The eight seeded U.S. players are listed below. Helen Jacobs is the champion; others show in brackets the round in which they were eliminated.

1. (United States) Helen Jacobs (champion)
2. (United States) Sarah Fabyan (finalist)
3. (United States) Carolin Babcock (quarterfinals)
4. (United States) Marjorie Van Ryn (quarterfinals)
5. (United States) Gracyn Wheeler (third round)
6. (United States) Catherine Wolf (third round)
7. (United States) Dorothy Andrus (third round)

== Draw ==
=== Final eight ===
Quarterfinals
1	(United States) Helen Jacobs	6	6
(United Kingdom) Nancy Lyle	4	0
4	(United States) Marjorie Van Ryn	2	0
(United Kingdom) Phyllis Mudford King	5	6
2	(United States) Sarah Fabyan	7	5	6
(United Kingdom) Freda James	5	7	4
3	(United States) Carolin Babcock	7	3	2
(United Kingdom) Kay Stammers	5	6	6

Semifinals
1	(United States) Helen Jacobs	6	6
(United Kingdom) Phyllis Mudford King	4	3
2	(United States) Sarah Fabyan	9	6
(United Kingdom) Kay Stammers	7	5

Finals
1	(United States) Helen Jacobs	6	6
3	(United States) Sarah Fabyan	2	4

Preceded by 1935 Wimbledon Championships – Women's singles	Grand Slam women's singles	Succeeded by 1936 Australian Championships – Women's singles
