= 1934 Wimbledon Championships =

- Date: 25 June – 7 July
- Edition: 54th
- Category: Grand Slam
- Surface: Grass
- Location: Church Road; SW19, Wimbledon, London, United Kingdom
- Venue: All England Lawn Tennis and Croquet Club

Champions

Men's singles
- (United Kingdom) Fred Perry

Women's singles
- (United Kingdom) Dorothy Round

Men's doubles
- (United States) George Lott / (United States) Lester Stoefen

Women's doubles
- (France) Simonne Mathieu / (United States) Elizabeth Ryan

Mixed doubles
- (Japan) Ryuki Miki / (United Kingdom) Dorothy Round
← 1933 ·	Wimbledon Championships	· 1935 →

The 1934 Wimbledon Championships took place on the outdoor grass courts at the All England Lawn Tennis and Croquet Club in Wimbledon, London, United Kingdom. The tournament was held from Monday 25 June until Saturday 7 July 1934. It was the 54th staging of the Wimbledon Championships, and the third Grand Slam tennis event of 1934. Fred Perry and Dorothy Round won the singles titles.

== Finals ==
=== Men's singles ===
(United Kingdom) Fred Perry defeated (Australia) Jack Crawford, 6–3, 6–0, 7–5

=== Women's singles ===
(United Kingdom) Dorothy Round defeated (United States) Helen Jacobs, 6–2, 5–7, 6–3

=== Men's doubles ===
(United States) George Lott / (United States) Lester Stoefen defeated (France) Jean Borotra / (France) Jacques Brugnon, 6–2, 6–3, 6–4

=== Women's doubles ===
(France) Simonne Mathieu / (United States) Elizabeth Ryan defeated (United States) Dorothy Andrus / (France) Sylvie Henrotin, 6–3, 6–3

=== Mixed doubles ===
(Japan) Ryuki Miki / (United Kingdom) Dorothy Round defeated (United Kingdom) Bunny Austin / (United Kingdom) Dorothy Shepherd Barron, 3–6, 6–4, 6–0

Preceded by 1934 French Championships	Grand Slams	Succeeded by 1934 U.S. National Championships
