= Lester Stoefen =

American tennis player

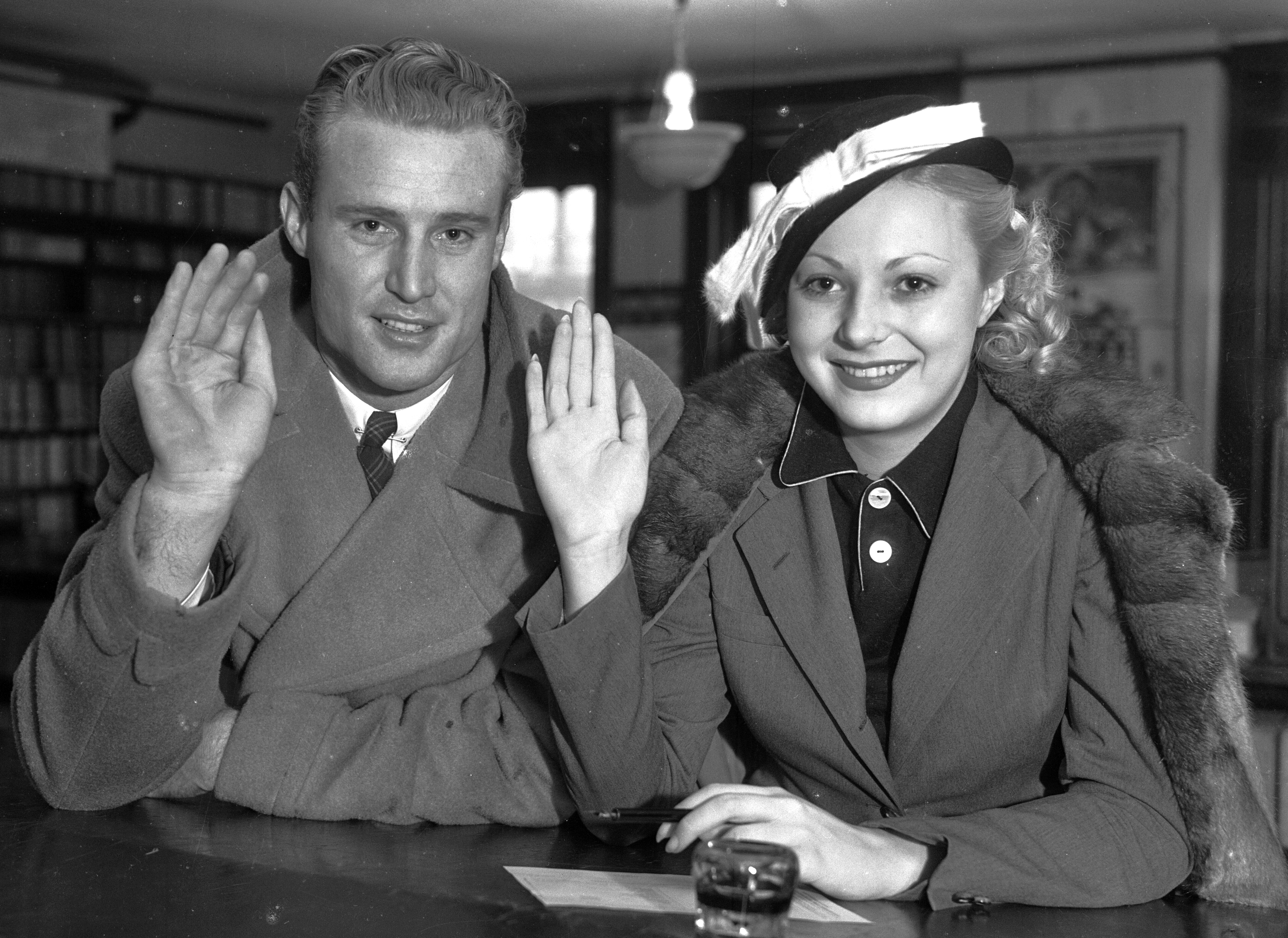
- Stoefen (left) with fianceé Ruth Henrietta Moody. 1936
- Full name: Lester Rollo Stoefen
- Country (sports): United States
- Born: March 30, 1911; Des Moines, Iowa, U.S.
- Died: February 8, 1970 (aged 58); La Jolla, CA, U.S.
- Height: 6 ft 6 in (1.98 m)
- Turned pro: 1935 (amateur from 1930)
- Retired: 1942

Singles
- Highest ranking: No. 9 (1933, Pierre Gillou)

Grand Slam singles results
- Wimbledon: QF (1933, 1934)
- US Open: SF (1933)
- Professional majors
- US Pro: SF (1935)
- Wembley Pro: SF (1935, 1937)
- French Pro: SF (1936, 1939)

Doubles

Grand Slam doubles results
- Wimbledon: W (1933)
- US Open: W (1933, 1934)

Mixed doubles

Grand Slam mixed doubles results
- Wimbledon: 4R (1934)
- US Open: F (1934)

Team competitions
- Davis Cup: F (1934^{Ch})

Lester Rollo Stoefen (March 30, 1911 – February 8, 1970) was an American tennis player of the 1930s.

== Career ==
Stoefen, partnering with compatriot George Lott, won three Grand Slam doubles titles: 1934 Wimbledon Championships, 1933 and 1934 U.S. National Championships. In 1933 he was ranked world No. 9 by Pierre Gillou (president of the Fédération Française de Tennis) and World No. 10 by A. Wallis Myers of The Daily Telegraph. Stoefen reached the semifinals of the U. S. Championships singles in 1933, losing to Fred Perry in straight sets.

In 1934 he played for the US Davis Cup team and won all his six matches, including the only match the US won in their defeat in the final against Great Britain. Also in 1934 Stoefen won the U.S. Indoor Tennis Championships singles event, defeating Gregory Mangin in the final in three straight sets.

Stoefen signed a professional contract in November 1934 with promoter Bill O'Brien. In January 1935, at Madison Square Garden, he started a series of head-to-head matches against Ellsworth Vines and by March trailed him 1–25.

== Personal life ==
He was the cousin of basketball player Art Stoefen, although they were commonly mistaken for brothers, and both attended Los Angeles High School.

On February 6, 1936, he married actress Ruth Moody in Hollywood.

He died in La Jolla, California on February 8, 1970, of liver cirrhosis.

== Grand Slam finals ==
=== Doubles (3 titles) ===
Result	Year	Championship	Surface	Partner	Opponents	Score
Win	1933	U.S. National Championships	Grass	(United States) George Lott	(United States) Frank Shields (United States) Frank Parker	11–13, 9–7, 9–7, 6–3
Win	1934	Wimbledon	Grass	(United States) George Lott	(France) Jean Borotra (France) Jacques Brugnon	6–2, 6–3, 6–4
Win	1934	U.S. National Championships	Grass	(United States) George Lott	(United States) Wilmer Allison (United States) John Van Ryn	6–4, 9–7, 3–6, 6–4

=== Mixed doubles (1 runner-up) ===
Result	Year	Championship	Surface	Partner	Opponents	Score
Loss	1934	U.S. National Championships	Grass	(United States) Elizabeth Ryan	(United States) Helen Jacobs (United States) George Lott	6–4, 11–13, 2–6
