= Guy Cooper (tennis) =

British tennis player (1907–1962)

- Full name: Harry Guy Nugent Cooper
- Country (sports): (United Kingdom) Great Britain
- Born: 1907 Surbiton, Surrey, England
- Died: 15 February 1962 Guildford, Surrey, England

Singles

Grand Slam singles results
- Wimbledon: 3R (1934, 1936)

Doubles

Grand Slam doubles results
- Wimbledon: 3R (1931, 1934, 1936, 1937)

Grand Slam mixed doubles results
- Wimbledon: 4R (1933)

Harry Guy Nugent Cooper (1907–1962) was a British surgeon and amateur tennis player.

The eldest son of a general practitioner, Cooper was born in Surbiton, Surrey, and was a nephew of five–time Wimbledon champion Charlotte Sterry (née Cooper). He was educated at Rugby School and during the late 1920s attended Oriel College, Oxford, before further studies at Guy's Hospital.

Cooper competed at the Wimbledon Championships between 1928 and 1950, twice reaching the singles third round. His only fourth round appearance came partnering Evelyn Dearman in mixed doubles. He gained full Oxford blues as captain of their 1929 tennis team and in the 1930s twice claimed the singles title at the Brockenhurst Open. During World War II, Cooper served in the army and attained the rank of lieutenant-colonel. He continued briefly in tennis after the war and was a British top 10 ranked player at the age of 41.

Post war, Cooper held positions at Royal Surrey County Hospital and was a visiting surgeon at Surbiton Hospital.
