= Hilda Wallis =

Irish tennis player

- Full name: Mabel Hilda Wallis
- Country (sports): Ireland
- Born: 12 November 1900; Ireland
- Died: 8 December 1979 (aged 79); Bray, County Wicklow, Ireland

Singles

Grand Slam singles results
- Wimbledon: 3R (1936)

Other tournaments
- Olympic Games: 1R (1924)

Doubles

Grand Slam doubles results
- Wimbledon: 2R (1924)

Other doubles tournaments
- Olympic Games: 1R (1924)

Mixed doubles

Grand Slam mixed doubles results
- Wimbledon: 2R (1936)

Other mixed doubles tournaments
- Olympic Games: QF (1924)

Mabel Hilda Wallis (12 November 1900 – 8 December 1979) was an Irish tennis player.

Wallis reached the final of the Irish Championships at Dublin for the first time in 1921 where she lost to Elizabeth Ryan. She won the Irish title in 1924, 1926, 1930 and 1933.

She participated twice in Wimbledon. In 1924, she lost her second round match against Dorothy Shepherd Barron 0–6, 1–6. Twelve years later, in 1936, she reached the third round but had to pull out of the tournament.

Wallis participated in the 1924 Summer Olympics at Paris where she reached the quarterfinals in mixed doubles alongside Edwin McCrea.
