= Carolin Babcock =

American tennis player (1912–1987)

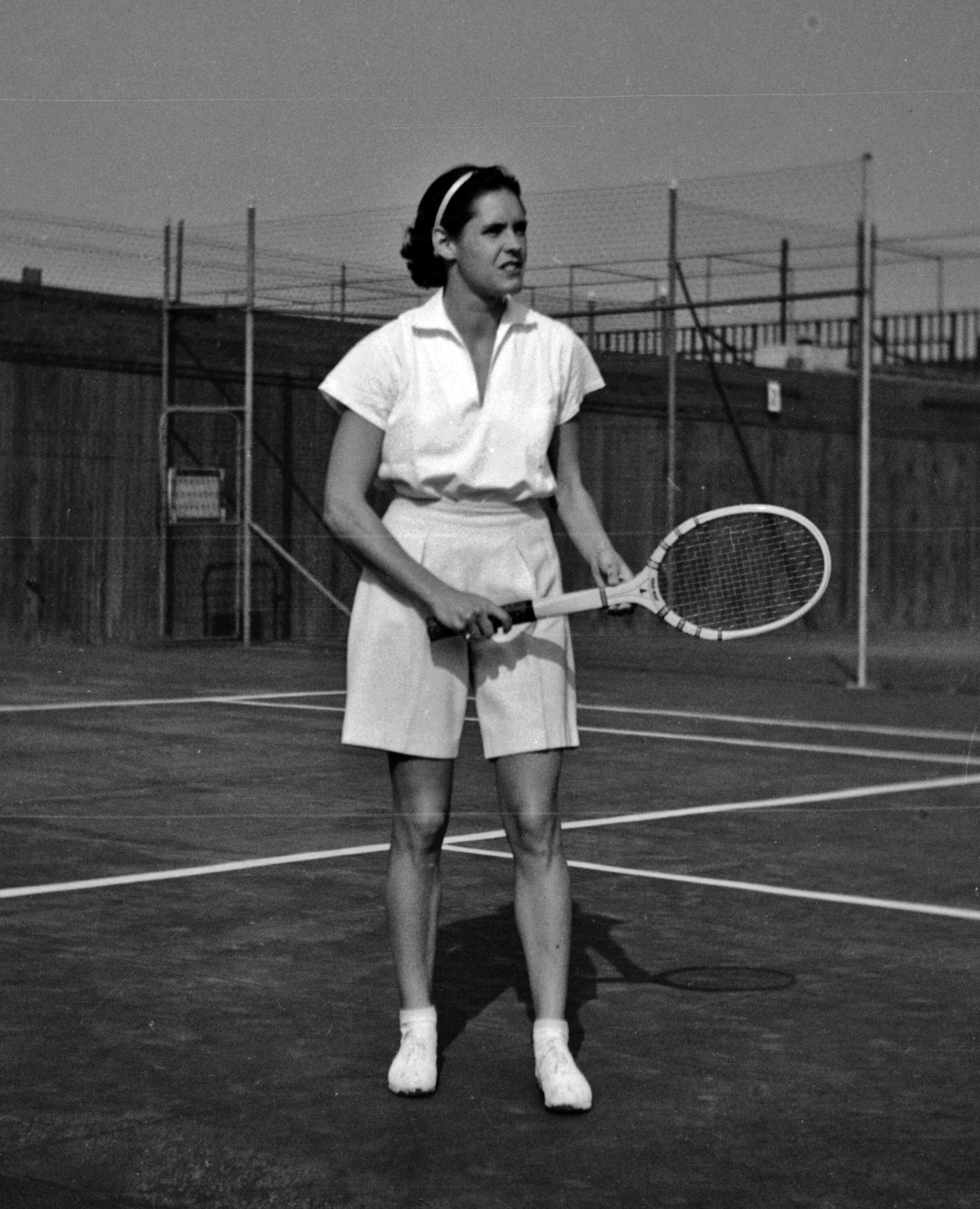
- Babcock in 1936
- Full name: Carolin Antoinette Babcock Stark
- Country (sports): United States
- Born: May 26, 1912 Billings, Montana, U.S.
- Died: March 25, 1987 (aged 74) New York, New York, U.S.
- Plays: Right-handed

Singles
- Highest ranking: No. 10 (1934)

Grand Slam singles results
- French Open: 2R (1934)
- Wimbledon: 4R (1934)
- US Open: F (1932)

Doubles

Grand Slam doubles results
- Wimbledon: 1R (1934, 1936)
- US Open: W (1936)

Grand Slam mixed doubles results
- Wimbledon: 4R (1934)

Team competitions
- Wightman Cup: (1933, 1934)

Carolin Babcock Stark (née Babcock; May 26, 1912 – March 25, 1987) was a tennis player from the United States. She won the women's doubles title with Marjorie Van Ryn at the 1936 U.S. Championships. Babcock was the runner-up in singles at the 1932 U.S. Championships, losing to Helen Hull Jacobs in straight sets. Stark also was the runner-up in women's doubles at the 1934, 1935, and 1937 editions of that tournament.

According to A. Wallis Myers of The Daily Telegraph and the Daily Mail, Babcock was ranked in the world top 10 in 1934 and 1936, both years being ranked world No. 10. She was included in the year-end top ten rankings issued by the United States Tennis Association from 1932 through 1937. She was the third-ranked U.S. player in 1932 and 1934.

Babcock was born in Billings, Montana and graduated from the Marlborough School in Los Angeles in 1934. In 1937, she married Richard Salisbury Stark. She died aged 74 at Southampton (Long Island) Hospital, New York, two days after suffering a stroke at her home in the North Haven section of Sag Harbor.

== Grand Slam finals ==
=== Singles (1 runner-up) ===
Result	Year	Championship	Surface	Opponent	Score
Loss	1932	U.S. Championships	Grass	(United States) Helen Jacobs	2–6, 2–6

=== Doubles (1 title, 3 runner-ups) ===
Result	Year	Championship	Surface	Partner	Opponents	Score
Loss	1934	U.S. National Championships	Grass	(United States) Dorothy Andrus	(United States) Helen Jacobs (United States) Sarah Palfrey Cooke	6–4, 3–6, 4–6
Loss	1935	U.S. National Championships	Grass	(United States) Dorothy Andrus	(United States) Helen Jacobs (United States) Sarah Palfrey Cooke	4–6, 2–6
Win	1936	U.S. National Championships	Grass	(United States) Marjorie Gladman Van Ryn	(United States) Helen Jacobs (United States) Sarah Palfrey Cooke	9–7, 2–6, 6–4
Loss	1937	U.S. National Championships	Grass	(United States) Marjorie Gladman Van Ryn	(United States) Alice Marble (United States) Sarah Palfrey Cooke	5–7, 4–6

== Grand Slam singles tournament timeline ==
Key
W	F	SF	QF	#R	RR	Q#	DNQ	A	NH

(W) winner; (F) finalist; (SF) semifinalist; (QF) quarterfinalist; (#R) rounds 4, 3, 2, 1; (RR) round-robin stage; (Q#) qualification round; (DNQ) did not qualify; (A) absent; (NH) not held; (SR) strike rate (events won / competed); (W–L) win–loss record.

Tournament	1929	1930	1931	1932	1933	1934	1935	1936	1937	Career SR
Australian Championships	A	A	A	A	A	A	A	A	A	0 / 0
French Championships	A	A	A	A	A	2R	A	A	A	0 / 1
Wimbledon	A	A	A	A	A	4R	A	3R	A	0 / 2
U.S. Championships	1R	2R	A	F	3R	SF	QF	QF	3R	0 / 8
SR	0 / 1	0 / 1	0 / 0	0 / 1	0 / 1	0 / 3	0 / 1	0 / 2	0 / 1	0 / 11

== See also ==
- Performance timelines for all female tennis players since 1978 who reached at least one Grand Slam final
