= Mary Heeley =

British tennis player

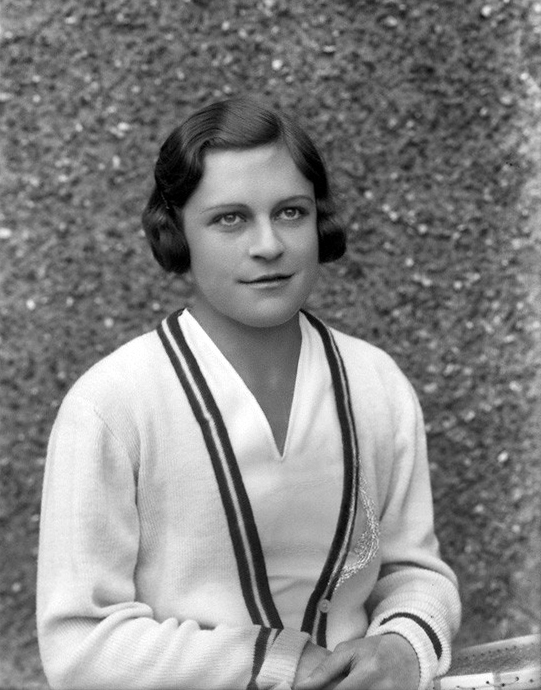
- Full name: Gertrude Mary Cartwright Heeley
- Country (sports): United Kingdom
- Born: March 30, 1911 Birmingham, England
- Died: 2002 (aged 90–91)
- Plays: Right–handed

Singles
- Highest ranking: No. 6 (1932)

Grand Slam singles results
- Wimbledon: SF (1932)
- US Open: QF (1933)

Doubles

Grand Slam doubles results
- Wimbledon: SF (1930)
- US Open: SF (1933)

Grand Slam mixed doubles results
- Wimbledon: F (1933)

Mary Cartwright Heeley was a British female tennis player.

== Career ==
Heeley was born on 30 March 1911 in Birmingham and was educated at the Edgbaston High School. In 1928 she won the Junior Championships of Great Britain.

Heeley reached the doubles final at the 1933 Wimbledon Championships with Norman Farquharson but were defeated in the final by Hilde Krahwinkel Sperling and Gottfried von Cramm in two straight sets. Her best singles performance at a Grand Slam tournament was reaching the semifinal at the 1932 Wimbledon Championships which she lost in straight sets to eventual champion Helen Wills Moody.

In May 1929 she was a runner–up at the British Hard Court Championships losing the final in straight sets to Simonne Mathieu. In 1931 she defeated Jeanette Morfey in the final of the British Covered Court Championships, played on wood courts at the Queen's Club in London, with the loss of just one game. In 1932 she won the Kent Championships after a three–sets victory in the final over Freda James. That year she was ranked No.1 in Britain.

She was part of the British team that lost the 1933 Wightman Cup against the United States at the West Side Tennis Club in New York. She played a doubles match with Dorothy Round which they lost in straight sets to Helen Jacobs and Sarah Palfrey. That same year she won the doubles title with Round at the Pacific Coast Championships. One of her most successful tournaments was the North of England Championships which she won five times (1930–31, 1935–37).

Mary Heeley died in 2002.

== Grand Slam finals ==
=== Mixed doubles (1 runner-up) ===
| Result | Year | Championship | Surface | Partner | Opponents | Score |
|---|---|---|---|---|---|---|
| Loss | 1933 | Wimbledon | Grass | (South Africa) Norman Farquharson | (Germany) Gottfried von Cramm (Germany) Hilde Krahwinkel Sperling | 5–7, 6–8 |
