= Phyllis Mudford King =

English tennis player

- Country (sports): United Kingdom
- Born: 23 August 1905 Wallington, Surrey, England, UK
- Died: 27 January 2006 (aged 100) Horley, Surrey, England, UK

Singles
- Career record: 462-103 (81.8%)
- Career titles: 61
- Highest ranking: No. 7 (1930)

Grand Slam singles results
- French Open: 3R (1930)
- Wimbledon: QF (1930)
- US Open: SF (1935)

Grand Slam doubles results
- Wimbledon: W (1931)

Grand Slam mixed doubles results
- Wimbledon: SF (1930)

Phyllis Mudford King (née Mudford; 23 August 1905 – 27 January 2006) was an English female tennis player and the oldest living Wimbledon champion when she died at age 100.

Phyllis Evelyn Mudford was born in 1905 in Wallington, Surrey. She was educated at Sutton High School, where she was Captain of Tennis, and one of the school's four houses is named in her honour. She won the Wimbledon Ladies' Doubles Championship in 1931 with partner Dorothy Shepherd-Barron, and last took part in the tournament in 1953.

In 1931, she won the singles title at the Kent Championships after defeating Dorothy Round in the final in straight sets. In 1934, she again won the title beating Joan Hartigan in the final. She played for Britain in the Wightman Cup in 1930, 1931, 1932 and 1935.

In a codicil to her will, dated 14 February 1983, King left a legacy to the All England Club Wimbledon for "a Trophy to be competed for annually".

== Marriage ==
Mudford married Maurice Richard King at St Mark with St Philip, Reigate on 30 April 1932.

== Grand Slam finals ==
=== Doubles (1 title, 1 runner-up) ===
Result	Year	Championship	Surface	Partner	Opponents	Score
Win	1931	Wimbledon	Grass	(United Kingdom) Dorothy Shepherd-Barron	(France) Doris Metaxa (Belgium) Josane Sigart	3–6, 6–3, 6–4
Loss	1937	Wimbledon	Grass	(United Kingdom) Elsie Pittman	(France) Simonne Mathieu (United Kingdom) Billie Yorke	3–6, 3–6
