= Helen Jacobs =

American tennis player (1908–1997)

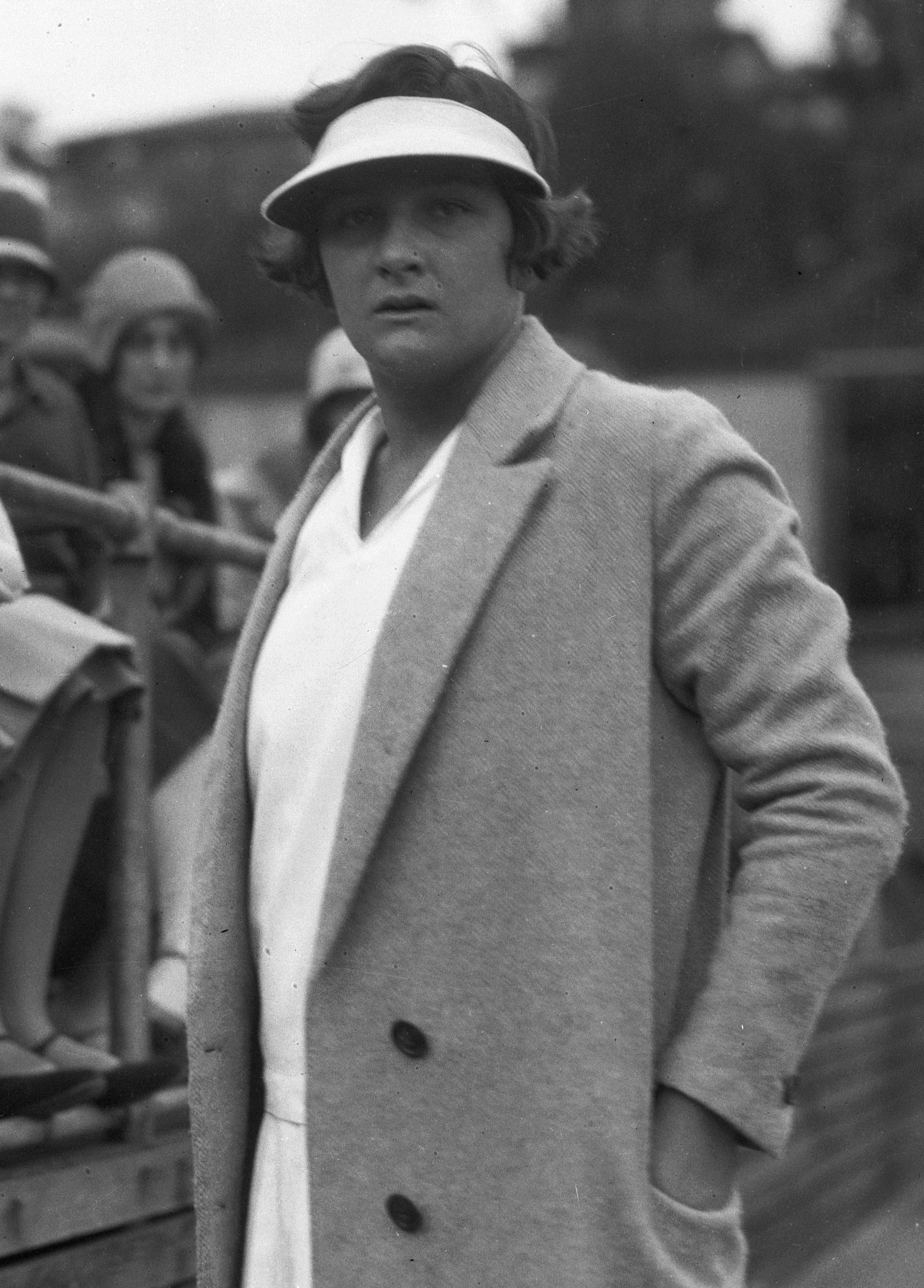
- Jacobs c. 1928
- Full name: Helen Hull Jacobs
- Country (sports): United States
- Born: August 6, 1908 Globe, Arizona, U.S.
- Died: June 2, 1997 (aged 88) East Hampton, New York, U.S.
- Retired: 1947
- Int. Tennis HoF: 1962 (member page)

Singles
- Highest ranking: No. 1 (1936, A. Wallis Myers)

Grand Slam singles results
- French Open: F (1930, 1934)
- Wimbledon: W (1936)
- US Open: W (1932, 1933, 1934, 1935)

Grand Slam doubles results
- French Open: F (1934)
- Wimbledon: F (1932, 1936, 1939)
- US Open: W (1932, 1934, 1935)

Grand Slam mixed doubles results
- US Open: W (1934)

Team competitions
- Wightman Cup: (1927, 1929, 1931, 1932, 1933, 1934, 1935, 1936, 1937, 1939)

Helen Hull Jacobs (August 6, 1908 – June 2, 1997) was an American tennis player who won nine Grand Slam titles. In 1936 she was ranked No. 1 in singles by A. Wallis Myers.

== Early life ==
Jacobs was born in Globe, Arizona, and was Jewish. Her parents, Roland (a mining executive, and then a newspaper advertising executive) and Eula Jacobs, moved the family to San Francisco in 1914. She was the best-known Jewish female player of the interwar period.

== Tennis career ==
Jacobs had a powerful serve and overhead smash and a sound backhand, but she never learned to hit a flat forehand, despite her friendship with, and some coaching from, Bill Tilden. Like both her Wightman Cup coach Hazel Hotchkiss Wightman and her archrival Helen Wills Moody, she grew up in Berkeley, California, learned the game at the Berkeley Tennis Club, pursued her undergraduate degree at the University of California, Berkeley, and was inducted into the Cal Sports Hall of Fame.

Jacobs won five Grand Slam singles titles and was an eleven-time Grand Slam singles runner-up. Six of those losses were to Helen Wills Moody. Jacobs's only victory over Moody was in the final of the 1933 U.S. Championships. Moody retired from the match with a back injury while trailing 3–0 in the third set to a chorus of boos from the audience who believed that Moody quit the match merely to deny Jacobs the satisfaction of finishing out her victory. It was reported by many witnesses after the match that Moody still planned to play her doubles match later that afternoon but was advised against it. Years later, Moody confirmed her injury, saying, "My back is kind of funny. The vertebra between the fourth and fifth disk is thin. When the disk slips around, it's intolerable. It rained the whole week before that final match. I lay in bed, and that was bad because it stiffened worse. I just couldn't play any longer, but I didn't say anything because it would look like an excuse." Jacobs almost defeated Moody again when she had match point at 6–3, 3–6, 5–3 in the 1935 Wimbledon Championships singles final but a mishit on a short lob, which she decided to let bounce, cost her the point and four games later the match. In the 1938 Wimbledon final against Moody, Jacobs turned her ankle at 4–4 in the first set and hobbled around the court for the remainder of the match, with Moody winning the final eight games and the second set lasting a mere eight minutes. When asked after the match why she did not accept Hazel Wightman's on-court advice to quit the match after the injury, Jacobs said that continuing was the sporting thing to do so that Moody could enjoy the full taste of victory, an obvious allusion to Moody's retirement from the 1933 U.S. final. Moody said, "I was very sorry about Helen's ankle. But it couldn't be helped, could it? I thought there was nothing I could do but get it over as quickly as possible." In total, Jacobs lost 14 of the 15 career singles matches she played against Moody.

Jacobs won three Grand Slam women's doubles titles and one in mixed doubles. She was the runner-up at six Grand Slam women's doubles tournaments and one Grand Slam mixed doubles tournament. She won the singles and women's doubles titles at the Italian Championships in 1934.

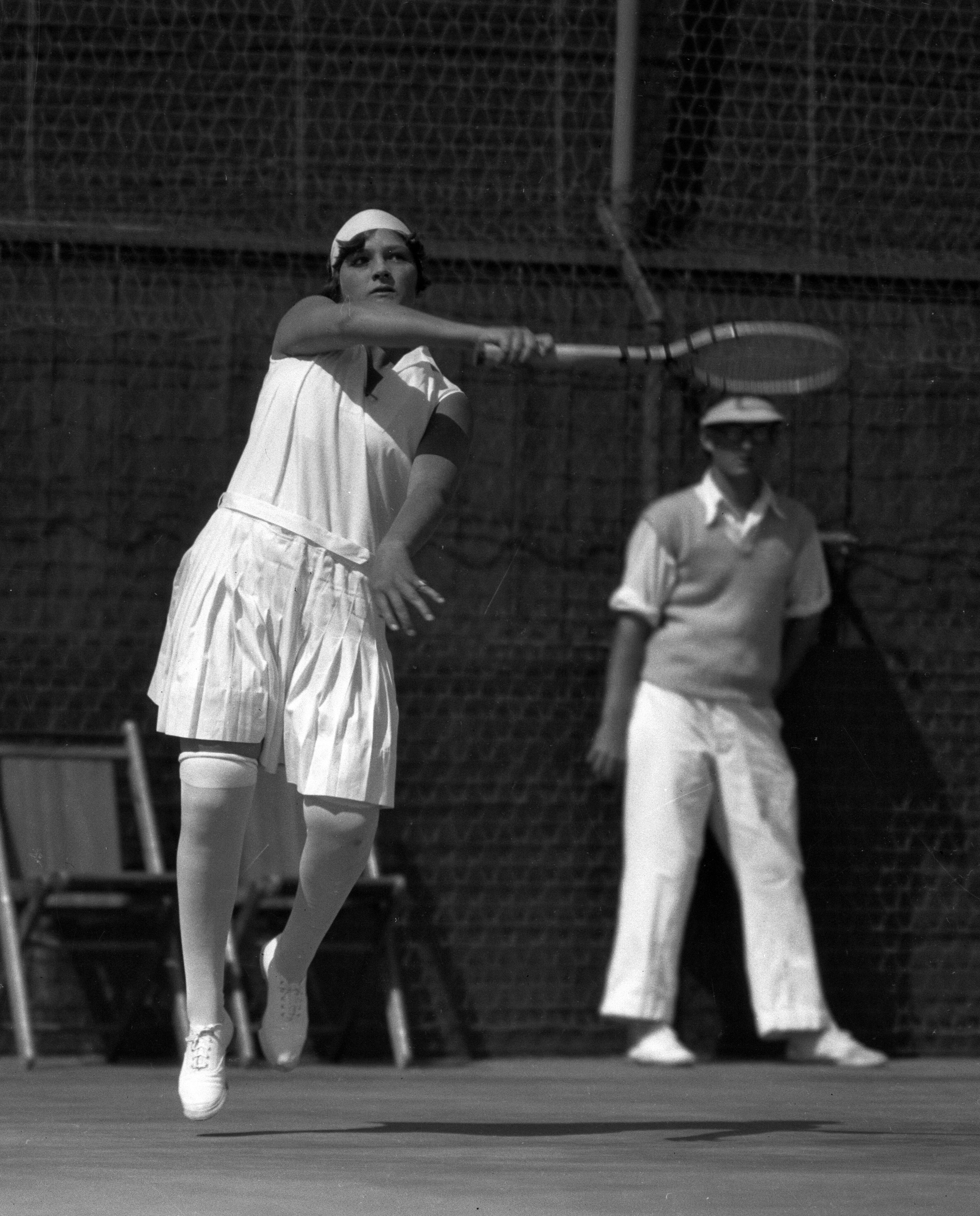
Jacobs at the 1928 Davis Cup

According to A. Wallis Myers and John Olliff of The Daily Telegraph and the Daily Mail, Jacobs was ranked in the world top 10 from 1928 through 1939 (no rankings issued from 1940 through 1945), reaching a career high of World No. 1 in those rankings in 1936. With the exceptions of 1930 and 1938, Jacobs was included in the year-end top 10 rankings by the United States Tennis Association from 1927 through 1941. She was the top-ranked U.S. player from 1932 through 1935.

Jacobs was a member of the U.S. Wightman Cup team from 1927 through 1937 and again in 1939. Her lifetime record was 19–11.

In 1933, Jacobs became the first woman to break with tradition by wearing man-tailored shorts at Wimbledon.

While she was still playing tennis, Jacobs became a writer. Her first books were Modern Tennis (1933) and Improve Your Tennis (1936). She also wrote fictional works, such as Storm Against the Wind (1944). Her autobiography Beyond the Game appeared in 1936. In 1949, she published Gallery of Champions, a collection of biographies of female players, which she dedicated to Molla Mallory.

=== Honors and awards ===
Jacobs was named Associated Press Female Athlete of the Year in 1933. She was inducted into the International Tennis Hall of Fame in 1962. In 2015, she was inducted into the National Gay and Lesbian Sports Hall of Fame.

== World War II and personal life ==
Jacobs served as a commander in the U.S. Navy intelligence during World War II, one of only five women to achieve that rank in the Navy.

Long known to have been lesbian, she was in a relationship from 1934 to 1943 with Henrietta Bingham, daughter of Louisville publisher and ambassador to England Robert Bingham. Her partner in later life was Virginia Gurnee. Jacobs died of heart failure in East Hampton, New York on June 2, 1997, where she had been living.

== Grand Slam finals ==
=== Singles (5 titles, 11 runners-up) ===
Result	Year	Championship	Surface	Opponent	Score
Loss	1928	U.S. National Championships	Grass	(United States) Helen Wills	2–6, 1–6
Loss	1929	Wimbledon	Grass	(United States) Helen Wills	1–6, 2–6
Loss	1930	French Championships	Clay	(United States) Helen Wills Moody	2–6, 1–6
Loss	1932	Wimbledon	Grass	(United States) Helen Wills Moody	3–6, 1–6
Win	1932	U.S. National Championships	Grass	(United States) Carolin Babcock	6–2, 6–2
Win	1933	U.S. National Championships (2)	Grass	(United States) Helen Wills Moody	8–6, 3–6, 3–0 retired
Loss	1934	French Championships	Clay	(United Kingdom) Margaret Scriven	5–7, 6–4, 1–6
Loss	1934	Wimbledon	Grass	(United Kingdom) Dorothy Round	2–6, 7–5, 3–6
Win	1934	U.S. National Championships (3)	Grass	(United States) Sarah Palfrey	6–1, 6–4
Loss	1935	Wimbledon	Grass	(United States) Helen Wills Moody	3–6, 6–3, 5–7
Win	1935	U.S. National Championships (4)	Grass	(United States) Sarah Palfrey Fabyan	6–2, 6–4
Win	1936	Wimbledon	Grass	(Nazi Germany) Hilde Krahwinkel Sperling	6–2, 4–6, 7–5
Loss	1936	U.S. National Championships	Grass	(United States) Alice Marble	6–4, 3–6, 2–6
Loss	1938	Wimbledon	Grass	(United States) Helen Wills	4–6, 0–6
Loss	1939	U.S. National Championships	Grass	(United States) Alice Marble	0–6, 10–8, 4–6
Loss	1940	U.S. National Championships	Grass	(United States) Alice Marble	2–6, 3–6

=== Doubles (3 titles, 6 runner-ups) ===
Result	Year	Championship	Surface	Partner	Opponents	Score
Loss	1931	U.S. National Championships	Grass	(United Kingdom) Dorothy Round	(United Kingdom) Betty Nuthall (United Kingdom) Eileen Bennett Whittingstall	2–6, 4–6
Loss	1932	Wimbledon	Grass	(United States) Elizabeth Ryan	(France) Doris Metaxa (Belgium) Josane Sigart	4–6, 3–6
Win	1932	U.S. National Championships	Grass	(United States) Sarah Palfrey	(United States) Alice Marble (United States) Marjorie Morrill	8–6, 6–1
Loss	1934	French Championships	Clay	(United States) Sarah Palfrey	(France) Simonne Mathieu (United States) Elizabeth Ryan	6–3, 4–6, 2–6
Win	1934	U.S. National Championships	Grass	(United States) Sarah Palfrey	(United States) Carolin Babcock (United States) Dorothy Andrus	4–6, 6–3, 6–4
Win	1935	U.S. National Championships	Grass	(United States) Sarah Palfrey Fabyan	(United States) Carolin Babcock (United States) Dorothy Andrus	6–4, 6–2
Loss	1936	Wimbledon	Grass	(United States) Sarah Palfrey Fabyan	(United Kingdom) Freda James (United Kingdom) Kay Stammers	2–6, 1–6
Loss	1936	U.S. National Championships	Grass	(United States) Sarah Palfrey Fabyan	(United States) Marjorie Gladman Van Ryn (United States) Carolin Babcock	7–9, 6–2, 4–6
Loss	1939	Wimbledon	Grass	(United Kingdom) Billie Yorke	(United States) Alice Marble (United States) Sarah Palfrey Fabyan	1–6, 0–6

=== Mixed doubles (1 title, 1 runner-up) ===
Result	Year	Championship	Surface	Partner	Opponents	Score
Loss	1932	U.S. National Championships	Grass	(United States) Ellsworth Vines	(United States) Sarah Palfrey (United Kingdom) Fred Perry	3–6, 5–7
Win	1934	U.S. National Championships	Grass	(United States) George Lott	(United States) Elizabeth Ryan (United States) Lester Stoefen	4–6, 13–11, 6–2

== Grand Slam singles tournament timeline ==
Key
W	F	SF	QF	#R	RR	Q#	DNQ	A	NH

(W) winner; (F) finalist; (SF) semifinalist; (QF) quarterfinalist; (#R) rounds 4, 3, 2, 1; (RR) round-robin stage; (Q#) qualification round; (DNQ) did not qualify; (A) absent; (NH) not held; (SR) strike rate (events won / competed); (W–L) win–loss record.

R = tournament restricted to French nationals and held under German occupation.

Tournament	1925	1926	1927	1928	1929	1930	1931	1932	1933	1934	1935	1936	1937	1938	1939	1940	1941	Career SR
Australian Championships	A	A	A	A	A	A	A	A	A	A	A	A	A	A	A	A	NH	0 / 0
French Championships	A	A	A	A	A	F	QF	QF	SF	F	SF	A	QF	A	A	NH	R	0 / 7
Wimbledon	A	A	A	3R	F	QF	SF	F	SF	F	F	W	QF	F	QF	NH	NH	1 / 12
U.S. Championships	2R	A	SF	F	SF	A	QF	W	W	W	W	F	SF	3R	F	F	SF	4 / 15
SR	0 / 1	0 / 0	0 / 1	0 / 2	0 / 2	0 / 2	0 / 3	1 / 3	1 / 3	1 / 3	1 / 3	1 / 2	0 / 3	0 / 2	0 / 2	0 / 1	0 / 1	5 / 34

== Bibliography ==
- Modern Tennis (1933)
- Improve Your Tennis (1936)
- Beyond the game: an autobiography (1936)
- "By your leave, sir" : the story of a WAVE (1943)
- Storm Against the Wind (1944)
- Laurel for Judy (1945)
- Adventure in Blue Jeans (1947)
- Gallery of Champions (1949)
- Center Court (1950)
- Proudly she serves! The realistic story of a tennis champion who becomes a Wave (1953)
- The young sportsman's guide to tennis (1961)
- Beginner's Guide to Winning Tennis (1961)
- Judy, Tennis Ace (1961)
- Better physical fitness for girls (1964)
- Courage to Conquer (1967)
- The Tennis Machine (1972)
- Famous modern American women athletes (1975)

== See also ==
- Performance timelines for all female tennis players who reached at least one Grand Slam final
- List of select Jewish tennis players
