= Freda James =

British tennis player

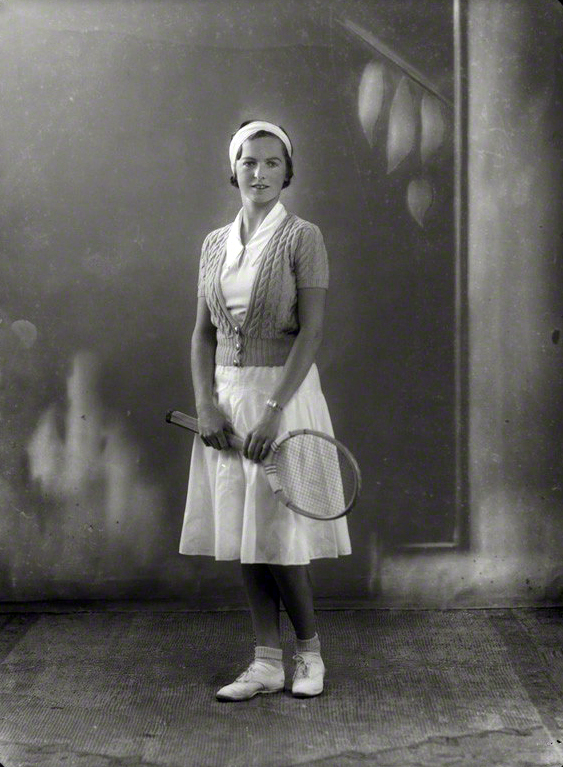
- Full name: Winifred Alice James Hammersley
- Country (sports): United Kingdom
- Born: 11 January 1911 Nottingham, England
- Died: 27 December 1988 (aged 77)
- Plays: Right-handed

Singles

Grand Slam singles results
- Wimbledon: 4R (1930, 1932, 1934, 1936, 1949)
- US Open: QF (1934, 1935)

Doubles

Grand Slam doubles results
- French Open: QF (1932, 1933)
- Wimbledon: W (1935, 1936)
- US Open: W (1933)

Grand Slam mixed doubles results
- Wimbledon: SF (1934, 1938)

Winifred Alice "Freda" James (married name Hammersley, 11 January 1911 – 27 December 1988) was a British female tennis player of the 1930s.

She won the women's doubles in Grand Slam events three times: in 1933 at the US Women's National Championship (with Betty Nuthall), and twice at Wimbledon in 1935 and 1936 (with Kay Stammers).

From 1931 to 1939, she was part of the British team in the Wightman Cup.

== Grand Slam finals ==
=== Doubles (3 titles, 2 runner-ups) ===
Result	Year	Championship	Surface	Partner	Opponents	Score
Loss	1933	Wimbledon	Grass	(United Kingdom) Billie Yorke	(France) Simonne Mathieu (United States) Elizabeth Ryan	2–6, 11–9, 4–6
Win	1933	U.S. National Championships	Grass	(United Kingdom) Betty Nuthall	(United States) Helen Wills (United States) Elizabeth Ryan	Forfeit
Win	1935	Wimbledon	Grass	(United Kingdom) Kay Stammers	(France) Simonne Mathieu (Germany) Hilde Krahwinkel Sperling	6–1, 6–4
Win	1936	Wimbledon	Grass	(United Kingdom) Kay Stammers	(United States) Sarah Palfrey Cooke (United States) Helen Hull Jacobs	6–2, 6–1
Loss	1939	U.S. National Championships	Grass	(United Kingdom) Kay Stammers	(United States) Sarah Palfrey Cooke (United States) Alice Marble	5–7, 6–8
