= Dorothy Andrus =

American tennis player

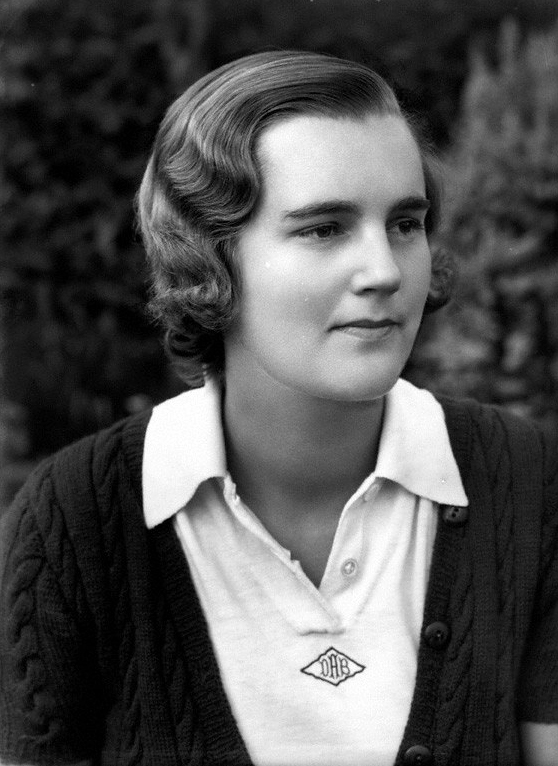
- Andrus in 1938
- Full name: Dorothy Bourne Andrus Voorhees
- Country (sports): United States
- Born: June 14, 1908; New York, New York, U.S.
- Died: September 28, 1989 (aged 81); Sarasota, Florida, U.S.
- Plays: Right-handed

Singles

Grand Slam singles results
- French Open: QF (1933)
- Wimbledon: 4R (1933, 1937)
- US Open: SF (1934)

Doubles

Grand Slam doubles results
- French Open: F (1934)
- Wimbledon: F (1934)
- US Open: F (1934, 1935)

Grand Slam mixed doubles results
- Wimbledon: 4R (1937, (1938)

Dorothy Bourne Andrus Voorhees (June 14, 1908 – September 28, 1989) was an American female tennis player who ranked No. 10 among the U.S. amateurs in 1932.

She was the granddaughter of New York Congressman John Emory Andrus.

She twice reached the final of the women's doubles competition at the U.S. National Championships (now US Open). In 1934 she partnered with Carolin Babcock and lost the final in three sets against Helen Jacobs and Sarah Palfrey Cooke. A year later, 1935, exactly the same final was played and this time she lost in two straight sets. Her best singles performance at a Grand Slam tournament came in 1934 when she reached the semifinals at the U.S. National Championships but lost in two sets to Sarah Palfrey Cooke.

In August 1931, she married Walter Anthony Burke, and the couple divorced, remarried, then ended their marriage permanently.

She later married Charles Voorhees and remained married until her death in 1989. They had two sons together, John and Charles.

== Grand Slam finals ==
=== Doubles (2 runner-ups) ===
Result	Year	Championship	Surface	Partners	Opponents	Score
Loss	1934	U.S. National Championships	Grass	(United States) Carolin Babcock	(United States) Helen Jacobs (United States) Sarah Palfrey	6–4, 3–6, 4–6
Loss	1935	U.S. National Championships	Grass	(United States) Carolin Babcock	(United States) Helen Jacobs (United States) Sarah Palfrey Fabyan	4–6, 2–6
