= Elizabeth Ryan career statistics =

American tennis player career statistics

This is a list of the main career statistics of professional American tennis player Elizabeth Ryan.

== Grand Slam finals ==
=== Singles: 5 (5 runner-ups) ===
Included: (*) Denotes All-Comers Final

Result	Year	Championship	Surface	Opponent	Score
Loss	1914 *	Wimbledon	Grass	(United Kingdom) Ethel Thomson Larcombe	3–6, 2–6
Loss	1920 *	Wimbledon	Grass	(United Kingdom) Dorothea Chambers	2–6, 1–6
Loss	1921	Wimbledon	Grass	(France) Suzanne Lenglen	2–6, 0–6
Loss	1926	U.S. National Championships	Grass	(United States) Molla Mallory	6–4, 4–6, 7–9
Loss	1930	Wimbledon	Grass	(United States) Helen Wills	2–6, 2–6

=== Women's doubles: 21 (17 titles, 4 runner-ups) ===
Included:

Result	Year	Championship	Surface	Partner	Opponents	Score
Win	1914	Wimbledon	Grass	(United Kingdom) Agnes Morton	(United Kingdom) Edith Hannam (United Kingdom) Ethel Thomson Larcombe	6–1, 6–3
Win	1919	Wimbledon	Grass	(France) Suzanne Lenglen	(United Kingdom) Dorothea Lambert Chambers (United Kingdom) Ethel Thomson Larcombe	4–6, 7–5, 6–3
Win	1920	Wimbledon	Grass	(France) Suzanne Lenglen	(United Kingdom) Dorothea Lambert Chambers (United Kingdom) Ethel Thomson Larcombe	6–4, 6–0
Win	1921	Wimbledon	Grass	(France) Suzanne Lenglen	(United Kingdom) Geraldine Beamish (South Africa) Irene Bowder Peacock	6–1, 6–2
Win	1922	Wimbledon	Grass	(France) Suzanne Lenglen	(United Kingdom) Kathleen McKane Godfree (United Kingdom) Margaret McKane Stocks	6–0, 6–4
Win	1923	Wimbledon	Grass	(France) Suzanne Lenglen	(United Kingdom) Joan Austin (United Kingdom) Evelyn Colyer	6–3, 6–1
Win	1925	Wimbledon	Grass	(France) Suzanne Lenglen	(United Kingdom) Kathleen Lidderdale (United Kingdom) Mary McIlquham	6–2, 6–2
Loss	1925	U.S. Championships	Grass	(United States) May Sutton	(United States) Mary Browne (United States) Helen Wills	4–6, 3–6
Win	1926	Wimbledon	Grass	(United States) Mary Browne	(United Kingdom) Evelyn Colyer (United Kingdom) Kathleen McKane Godfree	6–1, 6–1
Win	1926	U.S. Championships	Grass	(United States) Eleanor Goss	(United States) Mary Browne (United States) Charlotte Hosmer Chapin	3–6, 6–4, 12–10
Win	1927	Wimbledon	Grass	(United States) Helen Wills	(South Africa) Bobbie Heine (South Africa) Irene Bowder Peacock	6–3, 6–2
Win	1930	French Championships	Clay	(United States) Helen Wills	(France) Simone Barbier (France) Simonne Mathieu	6–3, 6–1
Win	1930	Wimbledon	Grass	(United States) Helen Wills	(United Kingdom) Edith Cross (United States) Sarah Palfrey	6–2, 9–7
Loss	1931	French Championships	Clay	(Germany) Cilly Aussem	(United Kingdom) Eileen Bennett Whittingstall (United Kingdom) Betty Nuthall	7–9, 2–6
Win	1932	French Championships	Clay	(United States) Helen Wills	(United Kingdom) Eileen Bennett Whittingstall (United Kingdom) Betty Nuthall	6–1, 6–3
Loss	1932	Wimbledon	Grass	(United States) Helen Jacobs	(France) Doris Metaxa (Belgium) Josane Sigart	4–6, 3–6
Win	1933	French Championships	Clay	(France) Simonne Mathieu	(France) Sylvie Jung Henrotin (France) Colette Rosambert	6–1, 6–3
Win	1933	Wimbledon	Grass	(France) Simonne Mathieu	(United Kingdom) Freda James (United Kingdom) Billie Yorke	6–2, 9–11, 6–4
Loss	1933	U.S. Championships	Grass	(United States) Helen Wills	(United Kingdom) Freda James (United Kingdom) Betty Nuthall	default
Win	1934	French Championships	Clay	(France) Simonne Mathieu	(United States) Helen Jacobs (United States) Sarah Palfrey	3–6, 6–4, 6–2
Win	1934	Wimbledon	Grass	(France) Simonne Mathieu	(United Kingdom) Dorothy Andrus (France) Sylvie Jung Henrotin	6–3, 6–3

=== Mixed doubles: 14 (9 titles, 5 runner-ups) ===
Included:

Result	Year	Championship	Surface	Partner	Opponents	Score
Win	1919	Wimbledon	Grass	(United Kingdom) Randolph Lycett	(United Kingdom) Dorothea Chambers (United Kingdom) Albert Prebble	6–0, 6–0
Loss	1920	Wimbledon	Grass	(United Kingdom) Randolph Lycett	(France) Suzanne Lenglen (Australia) Gerald Patterson	5–7, 3–6
Win	1921	Wimbledon	Grass	(United Kingdom) Randolph Lycett	(United Kingdom) Phyllis Howkins (United Kingdom) Max Woosnam	6–3, 6–1
Loss	1922	Wimbledon	Grass	(United Kingdom) Randolph Lycett	(France) Suzanne Lenglen (Australia) Pat O'Hara Wood	4–6, 3–6
Win	1923	Wimbledon	Grass	(United Kingdom) Randolph Lycett	(United Kingdom) Dorothy Shepherd-Barron (British Raj) Lewis Deane	6–4, 7–5
Loss	1925	Wimbledon	Grass	(Italy) Umberto de Morpurgo	(France) Suzanne Lenglen (France) Jean Borotra	3–6, 3–6
Win	1926	U.S. Championships	Grass	(France) Jean Borotra	(United States) Hazel Hotchkiss Wightman (France) René Lacoste	6–4, 7–5
Win	1927	Wimbledon	Grass	(United States) Frank Hunter	(United Kingdom) Kathleen McKane Godfree (United Kingdom) Leslie Godfree	8–6, 6–0
Win	1928	Wimbledon	Grass	(South Africa) Patrick Spence	(Australia) Daphne Akhurst (Australia) Jack Crawford	7–5, 6–4
Win	1930	Wimbledon	Grass	(Australia) Jack Crawford	(Germany) Hilde Krahwinkel (Germany) Daniel Prenn	6–1, 6–3
Win	1932	Wimbledon	Grass	(Spain) Enrique Maier	(Belgium) Josane Sigart (Australia) Harry Hopman	7–5, 6–2
Win	1933	U.S. Championships	Grass	(United States) Ellsworth Vines	(United States) Sarah Palfrey (United States) George Lott	11–9, 6–1
Loss	1934	French Championships	Clay	(Australia) Adrian Quist	(France) Colette Rosambert (France) Jean Borotra	2–6, 4–6
Loss	1934	U.S. Championships	Grass	(United States) Lester Stoefen	(United States) Helen Jacobs (United States) George Lott	6–4, 11–13, 2–6

== World Championship finals ==
=== Singles: 1 (1 runner up) ===
Result	Year	Tournament	Surface	Opponent	Score
Loss	1922	World Hard Court Championships	Clay	(France) Suzanne Lenglen	3–6, 2–6

== Career finals ==
Notes:Ryans career began in 1905 with her first singles title coming in 1912. During a 19-year run within that career she won an incredible 659 titles in singles, doubles and mixed doubles. Her final singles title came in 1934.

=== Singles: 299, (244 titles, 55 runners up) ===
(*) Denotes All-Comers final (w.o.) denotes walkover. NY denotes (New Year)

Category + (Titles)
Grand Slam/World Championship (0)
National (8)
Regular (236)

Titles by Surface
Clay – Outdoor (146)
Grass – Outdoor (92)
Hard – Outdoor (2)
Unknown – Outdoor (1)
Carpet – Indoor (0)
Wood – Indoor (3)

No	Result	Date	Tournament	Surface	Opponent	Score
1.	Win	1-Jun-1912	Stratford-upon-Avon Open	Grass	(United States) Alice Ryan	default
2.	Win	10-Jul-1912	Winchester Open	Grass	(United Kingdom) Mrs Lynch-Talbot	2–6, 6–2, 6–3
3.	Win	22-Jul-1912	Westcliff-on-sea Open	Grass	(United Kingdom) ?	?
4.	Win	5-Aug-1912	Suffolk Championships	Grass	(United Kingdom) Agnes Morton	divided title
5.	Win	10-Aug-1912	Essex Championships	Grass	(United Kingdom) Jessie Coles	6–3, 6–4
1.	Loss	7-Sep-1912	Dinard International	Clay	(United Kingdom) Agnes Morton	2–6, 3–6
2.	Loss	23-Sep-1912	Kent Coast Championships	Grass	(United Kingdom) Winifred McNair	6–3, 1–6, 3–6
6.	Win	9-Feb-1913	Beaulieu Championships (Note: Organised by Beaulieu LTC early editions staged at the Hotel Bristoll, Also known as the Bristol Tournament, later known as the Beaulieu International Championship, Beaulieu-sur-Mer, France.)	Clay	(United Kingdom) M. Towler	6–2, 6–1
7.	Win	15-Feb-1913	Côte d'Azur Championships	Clay	(United Kingdom) Dagmar von Krohn	4–6 6–2 6–0
3.	Loss	22-Feb-1913	Championships of the Italian Riviera	Clay	(United Kingdom) Jessie Tripp	6–4, 4–6, 4–6
4.	Loss	1-Mar-1913	Monte Carlo Championships	Clay	(United Kingdom) Madeline O'Neill	3–6, 6–8
8.	Win	24-Mar-1913	Cannes Métropole Hotel Championship	Clay	(United Kingdom) Mrs Perrett	5–7 6–1 10–8
9.	Win	13-Apr-1913	International Championships of Barcelona	Clay	(France) Marie Décugis	6–3, 6–2
10.	Win	20-Apr-1913	Madrid Nuevo Club	Clay	(France) Marie Décugis	6–1, 6–2
11.	Win	28-Apr-1913	Bordeaux International	Clay	(France) Marie Décugis	6–3, 6–1
12.	Win	9-Jul-1913	Winchester Open	Grass	(United Kingdom) Marguerite Sudgen Pearce	6–2, 6–2
5.	Loss	12-Jul-1913	Leicestershire Championships	Grass	(United Kingdom) Gladys Lamplough	1–6, 4–6
6.	Loss	26-Jul-1913	Midland Counties Championships	Grass	(United Kingdom) Edith Hannam	0–6, 4–6
7.	Loss	16-Aug-1913	East of England Championships	Grass	(United Kingdom) Winifred McNair	5–7, 5–7
13.	Win	23-Aug-1913	North of England Championships	Grass	(United Kingdom) Ethel Thomson Larcombe	6–3, 6–3
8.	Loss	7-Sep-1913	Dinard International	Clay	(United Kingdom) Agnes Morton	1–6, 1–6
9.	Loss	9-Feb-1914	Championships of Hyères	Clay	(United Kingdom) E. White	1–5, retd.
10.	Loss	16-Feb-1914	Hôtel Bristol Championship	Clay	(United Kingdom) Jessie Tripp	4–6, 11–9,1 4–6
14.	Win	22-Feb-1914	Côte d'Azur Championships	Clay	(United Kingdom) M. Ward	6–4, 6–0
11.	Loss	3-Mar-1914	Monte Carlo Championships	Clay	(United Kingdom) Dorothea Lambert-Chambers	4–6, 1–6
12.	Loss	7-Mar-1914	Riviera Championships	Clay	(United Kingdom) Dorothea Lambert-Chambers	2–6, 1–6
15.	Win	30-Mar-1914	Championships of Cannes	Clay	(United Kingdom) Jessie Tripp	6–2, 6–1
16.	Win	6-Apr-1914	Cannes Métropole Hotel Championship	Clay	(United Kingdom) Jessie Tripp	4–6, 6–3, 6–4
12.	Loss	12-Apr-1914	Cannes Carlton Club Championship (Note: Also known as the Cannes Carlton Club Second Meeting)	Clay	(France) Suzanne Lenglen	3–6, 6–3, 2–6
17.	Win	20-Apr-1914	International Championships of Barcelona	Clay	(Spain) Luisa Marnet	6–3, 6–4
18.	Win	27-Apr-1914	Madrid Country Club Championship	Clay	(Spain) Maria de Irujo	6–0, 6–2
19.	Win	7-May-1914	City of Paris Championships	Clay	(France) Kate Fenwick	3–6, 6–4, 6–1
20.	Win	14-May-1914	Wiesbaden International	Clay	(Germany) Nelly Bamberger	6–2, 6–2
21.	Win	26-May-1914	Championships of Lower Austria	Clay	(Austria-Hungary) Marie Amende	6–3, 6–0
13.	Loss	6-Jul-1914	Wimbledon Championships *	Grass	(United Kingdom) Ethel Thomson Larcombe	3–6, 2–6
22.	Win	13-Jul-1914	Russian Empire Championships	Clay	(Russia) Natalia Sievers	6–3, 6–1
23.	Win	30-Jul-1914	Moscow International (2nd Meeting)	Clay	(Russia) ?	?
14.	Loss	7‑Apr‑1919 *	British Covered Court Championships	Wood (i)	(United Kingdom) Dorothea Lambert-Chambers	2–6, 1–6
?.	Win	19‑Apr‑1919	Roehampton Hard Court Tournament (2nd) (Note: The Roehampton Club staged a second edition of its women's invitation meeting usually in the autumn.)	Clay	(United Kingdom) Aurea Edgington	6–3, 6–1
24.	Win	19‑May‑1919	Surrey Grass Court Championships	Grass	(United Kingdom) Dorothea Lambert-Chambers	w.o.
25.	Win	26‑May‑1919	Middlesex Championships	Grass	(United Kingdom) Winifred Beamish	6–2, 4–6, 6–4
26.	Win	9‑Jun‑1919	Kent Championships	Grass	(United Kingdom) Dorothea Lambert-Chambers	2–6, 7–5, 6–4
27.	Win	14‑Jul‑1919	Irish Lawn Tennis Championships	Grass	(Republic of Ireland) Janet Jackson	6–0, 6–1
28.	Win	21‑Jul‑1919	County Dublin Championships	Grass	(Republic of Ireland) Janet Jackson	6–0, 6–1
29.	Win	28‑Jul‑1919	Northumberland Championships	Grass	(United Kingdom) Ethel Thomson Larcombe	6–3, 3–6, 6–1
30.	Win	11‑Aug‑1919	Derbyshire Championships	Grass	(United Kingdom) Ethel Thomson Larcombe	3–6, 6–4, 7–5
31.	Win	18‑Aug‑1919	North of England Championships	Grass	(United Kingdom) Leslie Cadle	6–2, 6–1
32.	Win	8‑Sep‑1919	South of England Championships	Grass	(United Kingdom) Phyllis Satterthwaite	6–1, 6–2
33.	Win	8‑Sep‑1919	Hendon Autumn Hard Courts (Note: Also known as the London Country Club Tournament)	Clay	(United Kingdom) Dorothy Holman	7–9, 6–2, 6–1
34.	Win	23‑Sep‑1919	Roehampton Invitation Tournament (2nd) (Note: The Roehampton Club staged a second edition of its women's invitation meeting)	Grass	(United Kingdom) Ethel Thomson Larcombe	divided title
15.	Loss	12‑Jan‑1920	Cannes Carlton Club (NY Meeting)	Clay	(France) Suzanne Lenglen	0–6, 1–6
35.	Win	16‑Feb‑1920	Cannes Carlton Club Championship (Note: Also known as the Cannes Carlton Club Second Meeting)	Clay	(United Kingdom) Geraldine Beamish	6–0, 6–1
16.	Loss	23‑Feb‑1920	Beaulieu Championships	Clay	(France) Suzanne Lenglen	2–6, 0–6 9
17.	Loss	1‑Mar‑1920	Monte Carlo Championships	Clay	(France) Suzanne Lenglen	1–6, 2–6
36.	Win	23‑Mar‑1920	Côte d'Azur Championships	Clay	(United Kingdom) Geraldine Beamish	4–6, 6–2, 6–2
37.	Win	29‑Mar‑1920	Cannes Championships	Clay	(United Kingdom) Geraldine Beamish	6–2, 6–2
38.	Win	7‑Apr‑1920	British Covered Court Championships	Wood (i)	(United Kingdom) Doris Craddock	6–4, 6–2
39.	Win	19‑Apr‑1920	Surrey Hard Court Championships	Clay	(United Kingdom) Doris Craddock	6–1, 6–0
40.	Win	3‑May‑1920	Hendon Spring Hard Courts (Note: Also known as the London Country Club Tournament)	Clay	(United Kingdom) Dorothy Holman	6–3, 6–3
41.	Win	10‑May‑1920	Roehampton Invitation Tournament	Grass	(United Kingdom) Madeline O'Neill	9-7, 6-3
18.	Loss	17‑May‑1920	Surrey Grass Court Championships	Grass	(United Kingdom) Dorothea Lambert-Chambers	4–6, 2–6
42.	Win	24‑May‑1920	Middlesex Championships	Grass	(United Kingdom) Dorothea Lambert-Chambers	7-5, 6-2
43.	Win	1‑Jun‑1920	Northern Championships	Grass	(United Kingdom) Aurea Edgington	6-1, 6-2
44.	Win	8‑Jun‑1920	Kent Championships	Grass	(United Kingdom) Winifred McNair	divided title
19.	Loss	23‑Jun‑1920	Wimbledon Championships *	Grass	(United Kingdom) Dorothea Lambert-Chambers	2–6, 1–6
45.	Win	12‑Jul‑1920	Irish Lawn Tennis Championships	Grass	(United Kingdom) Geraldine Beamish	6–2, 6–2
46.	Win	19‑Jul‑1920	County Dublin Championships	Grass	(United Kingdom) Geraldine Beamish	1–6, 6–3, 7–5
47.	Win	26‑Jul‑1920	Northumberland Championships	Grass	(United Kingdom) Dorothy Shepherd	6–1, 6–2
48.	Win	9‑Aug‑1920	Derbyshire Championships	Grass	(United Kingdom) Ethel Tanner	6–1, 6–2
49.	Win	16‑Aug‑1920	North of England Championships	Grass	(United Kingdom) Eleanor Rose	6–1, 6–3
50.	Win	30‑Aug‑1920	Budleigh Salterton Open	Grass	(United Kingdom) Phyllis Satterthwaite	6–3, 6–2
51.	Win	6‑Sep‑1920	Sussex Championships	Grass	(United Kingdom) Dorothy Holman	6–2, 2–6, 6–2
52.	Win	13‑Sep‑1920	South of England Championships	Grass	(United Kingdom) Geraldine Beamish	6–2, 4–6, 6–1
53.	Win	20‑Sep‑1920	Hendon Autumn Hard Courts (2nd) (Note: The London Country Club staged a second autumn edition of its women's event)	Clay	(United Kingdom) Dorothy Holman	6–4, 6–2
20.	Loss	10‑Jan‑1921	Cannes Carlton Club (NY Meeting)	Clay	(France) Suzanne Lenglen	0–6, 1–6
54.	Win	17‑Jan‑1921	Cannes Lawn Tennis Club Tournament	Clay	(United Kingdom) Phyllis Satterthwaite	1–6, 6–1, 6–2
20.	Loss	7‑Feb‑1921	Nice Championships	Clay	(France) Suzanne Lenglen	0–6, 2–6
21.	Loss	14‑Feb‑1921	Cannes Carlton Club Championship	Clay	(France) Suzanne Lenglen	6–0, 6–2
55.	Win	17‑Feb‑1921	Beaulieu Championships (Note: Organised by Beaulieu LTC early editions staged at the Hotel Bristoll, Also known as the Bristol Tournament, later known as the Beaulieu International Championships, Beaulieu-sur-Mer, France.)	Clay	(United Kingdom) Phyllis Satterthwaite	6–0, retd.
22.	Loss	28‑Feb‑1921	Monte Carlo Championships (Note: Played at the La Festa Club, Monte Carlo)	Clay	(France) Suzanne Lenglen	6–2, 6–0
56.	Win	7‑Mar‑1921	Riviera Championships	Clay	(United Kingdom) Phyllis Satterthwaite	6–4, 6–3
57.	Win	21‑Mar‑1921	Côte d'Azur Championships	Clay	(United Kingdom) Phyllis Satterthwaite	7–5, 6–2
58.	Win	18‑Apr‑1921	Surrey Hard Court Championships	Clay	(India) Irene Peacock	6–4, 6–1
59.	Win	25‑Apr‑1921	Hendon Spring Hard Courts (Note: Also known as the London Country Club Tournament)	Clay	(South Africa) Dorothy Kemmis Betty	6–2, 6–2
60.	Win	16‑May‑1921	Surrey Grass Court Championships	Grass	(United Kingdom) Dorothy Holman	6–0, 6–0
61.	Win	23‑May‑1921	Middlesex Championships	Grass	(United Kingdom) Geraldine Beamish	6–3, 6–4
62.	Win	30‑May‑1921	Northern Championships	Grass	(United Kingdom) Kitty Godfree	7–5, 6–4
63.	Win	6‑Jun‑1921	Kent Championships	Grass	(United Kingdom) Geraldine Beamish	9–7, 6–4
23.	Loss	20‑Jun‑1921	Wimbledon Championships	Grass	(United Kingdom) Phyllis Satterthwaite	6–1, 6–0
64.	Win	7‑Jul‑1921	Leicestershire Championships	Grass	(United Kingdom) Mabel Clayton	6–2, 6–3
65.	Win	11‑Jul‑1921	Irish Lawn Tennis Championships	Grass	(Republic of Ireland) Hilda Wallis	6–2, 6–1
66.	Win	18‑Jul‑1921	County Dublin Championships	Grass	(Republic of Ireland) Hilda Wallis	6–4, 6–0
67.	Win	25‑Jul‑1921	Northumberland Championships	Grass	(United Kingdom) Lesley Cadle	6–0, 6–1
68.	Win	1‑Aug‑1921	Angmering-on-Sea Open	Grass	(United Kingdom) Phyllis Satterthwaite	6–2, 6–1
69.	Win	8‑Aug‑1921	Derbyshire Championships	Grass	(United Kingdom) Muriel A. Wright	6-3, 6-2
70.	Win	15‑Aug‑1921	North of England Championships	Grass	(United Kingdom) Winifred McNair	6–3, 8–6
71.	Win	22‑Aug‑1921	Exmouth Open	Grass	(United States) Vandy Cape	6–1, 6–2
72.	Win	29‑Aug‑1921	Budleigh Salterton Open	Grass	(United Kingdom) Phyllis Satterthwaite	6–1, 6–2
73.	Win	5‑Sep‑1921	Le Touquet International Championship (Note: Also known as the Le Touquet First Meeting)	Clay	(United Kingdom) Madeline O'Neill	6–1, 6–5
74.	Win	12‑Sep‑1921	South of England Championships	Grass	(India) Irene Peacock	6–0, 6–3
75.	Win	26‑Sep‑1921	Hendon Autumn Hard Courts	Clay	(United Kingdom) Kitty Godfree	3–6, 7–5, 8–6
76.	Win	2‑Jan‑1922	Cannes Beau-Site (New Year Meeting) (Note: Also known as the Cannes Beau-Site First Meeting two editions played in succession this event from January 2–8)	Clay	(United Kingdom) Phyllis Satterthwaite	6–1, 6–1
77.	Win	9‑Jan‑1922	Cannes Beau-Site (NY Meeting) (Note: Also known as the Cannes Beau-Site First Meeting two editions played in succession this event from January 9–15)	Clay	(France) Sylvie Jung	6–3, 6–4
78.	Win	16‑Jan‑1922	Cannes Carlton Club (New Year Meeting)	Clay	(United Kingdom) Phyllis Satterthwaite	6–4, Retd.
79.	Win	6‑Feb‑1922	Nice New Year Meeting (Note: Also known as the Nice First Meeting.)	Clay	(United Kingdom) Phyllis Satterthwaite	6–2, 6–0
80.	Win	13‑Feb‑1922	Cannes Carlton Club Championship (Note: Also known as the Cannes Carlton Club Second Meeting)	Clay	(United Kingdom) Geraldine Beamish	3–6, 6–3, 6–2
81.	Win	20‑Feb‑1922	Beaulieu Championships (Note: Organised by Beaulieu LTC early editions staged at the Hotel Bristoll, Also known as the Bristol Tournament, later known as the Beaulieu International Championships, Beaulieu-sur-Mer, France.)	Clay	(United Kingdom) Geraldine Beamish	7–5, 8–6
82.	Win	27‑Feb‑1922	Monte Carlo Championships	Clay	(United Kingdom) Geraldine Beamish	6–2, 6–1
83.	Win	6‑Mar‑1922	Riviera Championships	Clay	Phyllis Satterthwaite	6–3, 6–3
84.	Win	13‑Mar‑1922	South of France Championships	Clay	(United Kingdom) Geraldine Beamish	3–6, 6–3, 6–1
85.	Win	20‑Mar‑1922	Côte d'Azur Championshipss	Clay	(United Kingdom) Geraldine Beamish	6–4, 6–3
86.	Win	27‑Mar‑1922	Cannes Championships	Clay	(United Kingdom) Geraldine Beamish	6–4, 6–4
87.	Win	17‑Apr‑1922	International Championships of Barcelona	Clay	(Spain) Isabel Fonrodona	6–1, 7–5
24.	Loss	13‑May‑1922	World Hard Court Championships	Clay	(France) Suzanne Lenglen	3–6, 2–6
88.	Win	22‑May‑1922	Surrey Grass Court Championships	Grass	(India) Irene Peacock	10–8, 6–2
89.	Win	6‑Jun‑1922	Northern Championships	Grass	(United Kingdom) Kitty Godfree	6–2, 8–6
25.	Loss	12‑Jun‑1922	Kent Championships	Grass	(United Kingdom) Kitty Godfree	6–3, 6–3
90.	Win	12‑Jul‑1922	Leicestershire Championships	Grass	(United Kingdom) Mabel Clayton	6–1, 6–4
91.	Win	24‑Jul‑1922	County Dublin Championships	Grass	(Republic of Ireland) Phoebe Blair-White	6–3, 6–1
92.	Win	7‑Aug‑1922	Angmering-on-Sea Open	Grass	(United Kingdom) Peggy Ingram	6–3, 6–2
93.	Win	14‑Aug‑1922	West Worthing Open	Grass	(United Kingdom) Ada Hollick	6–1, 6–2
26.	Loss	21‑Aug‑1922	North of England Championships	Grass	(United Kingdom) Kitty Godfree	2–6, 2–6
94.	Win	4‑Sep‑1922	Le Touquet International Championship (Note: Also known as the Le Touquet First Meeting)	Clay	(United Kingdom) Edith Hannam	6–3, 6–0
95.	Win	11‑Sep‑1922	Le Touquet (2nd Meeting)	Clay	(United Kingdom) Aurea Edgington	6–2, 6–4
96.	Win	2‑Oct‑1922	Hendon Autumn Hard Courts (2nd) (Note: The London Country Club staged a second autumn edition of its women's event)	Clay	(United Kingdom) Aurea Edgington	6–4, 4–6, 6–1
97.	Win	7‑Jan‑1923	Cannes Carlton Club (NY Meeting)	Clay	(United Kingdom) Phyllis Satterthwaite	9–7, 6–2
98.	Win	22‑Jan‑1923	Cannes Lawn Tennis Club Tournament (Note: Event for Cannes Lawn Tennis Club members only)	Clay	(United Kingdom) Madeline O'Neill	6–0, 6–0
27.	Loss	5‑Feb‑1923	Nice (New Year Meeting) (Note: Also known as the Nice First Meeting)	Clay	(France) Suzanne Lenglen	w.o.
28.	Loss	12‑Feb‑1923	Cannes Carlton Club Championship (Note: Also known as the Cannes Carlton Club Second Meeting)	Clay	(France) Suzanne Lenglen	6–3, 6–1
29.	Loss	20‑Feb‑1923	Beaulieu Championships (Note: Organised by Beaulieu LTC early editions staged at the Hotel Bristoll, Also known as the Bristol Tournament, later known as the Beaulieu International Championships, Beaulieu-sur-Mer, France.)	Clay	(United Kingdom) Geraldine Beamish	4–6, 3–6
30.	Loss	26‑Feb‑1923	Monte Carlo Championships	Clay	(United Kingdom) Kitty Godfree	5–7, 6–4, 2–6
31.	Loss	12‑Mar‑1923	South of France Championships	Clay	(France) Suzanne Lenglen	1–6, 0–6
99.	Win	2‑Apr‑1923	Cannes Metropole Hotel Championship	Clay	(United Kingdom) Phyllis Satterthwaite	w.o.
100.	Win	21‑May‑1923	Surrey Grass Court Championships	Grass	(United Kingdom) Eleanor Rose	3–6, 6–3, 6–2
101.	Win	28‑May‑1923	West of England Championships	Grass	(United Kingdom) Doris Craddock	8–6, 6–4
102.	Win	4‑Jun‑1923	Northern Championships	Grass	(United Kingdom) Dorothy Holman	6–3, 6–3
103.	Win	11‑Jun‑1923	Kent Championships	Grass	(United Kingdom) Phyllis Satterthwaite	6–3, 3–6, 6–3
104.	Win	18‑Jun‑1923	London Championships	Grass	(United Kingdom) Geraldine Beamish	6–3, 1–6, 6–2
105.	Win	9‑Jul‑1923	Ashby-de-la-Zouch Open Championships	Grass	(United Kingdom) Mary Mcilquham	6–2, 6–3
106.	Win	16‑Jul‑1923	Irish Lawn Tennis Championships	Grass	(Republic of Ireland) Mrs F W Price	6–1, 6–1
107.	Win	23‑Jul‑1923	County Dublin Championships	Grass	(Republic of Ireland) Phoebe Blair-White	7–5, 6–3
108.	Win	6‑Aug‑1923	Sandown Open	Grass	(United Kingdom) Violet Southam	6–3 6–1
109.	Win	13‑Aug‑1923	West Worthing Open	Grass	(United Kingdom) Phoebe Holcroft Watson	6–4, 6–2
110.	Win	20‑Aug‑1923	West Sussex Challenge Cup (Note: Event later became known as the West Sussex Championships held at Bognor Regis, England.)	Grass	(United Kingdom) Christine Tyrrell	6–2, 6–0
111.	Win	27‑Aug‑1923	Budleigh Salterton Open	Grass	(United States) Edith Clarke	6–3, 6–0
112.	Win	3‑Sep‑1923	Le Touquet International Championship	Clay	(United Kingdom) Phyllis Satterthwaite	6–3, 6–0
113.	Win	10‑Sep‑1923	Le Touquet (2nd Meeting)	Clay	(United Kingdom) Phyllis Satterthwaite	w.o.
114.	Win	24‑Dec‑1923	Monaco Championships	Clay	(United Kingdom) Phyllis Satterthwaite	3–6, 6–4, 6–4
115.	Win	31‑Dec‑1923	Cannes Beau-Site (NY Meeting)	Clay	(United Kingdom) Lesley Cadle	6–2, 6–4
116.	Win	7‑Jan‑1924	Cannes Carlton Club (New Year Meeting)	Clay	(United Kingdom) Phyllis Satterthwaite	6–3, 6–0
117.	Win	14‑Jan‑1924	Italian Riviera Championships	Clay	(United Kingdom) Phyllis Satterthwaite	6–3, 6–0
118.	Win	21‑Jan‑1924	Cannes Gallia Club Championship	Clay	(United Kingdom) Lesley Cadle	6–3, 6–2
119.	Win	11‑Feb‑1924	Cannes Carlton Club Championship	Clay	(United Kingdom) Phyllis Satterthwaite	6–2, 7–5
120.	Win	18‑Feb‑1924	Beaulieu Championships (Note: Organised by Beaulieu LTC early editions staged at the Hotel Bristol, Also known as the Bristol Tournament, later known as the Beaulieu International Championships, Beaulieu-sur-Mer, France.)	Clay	(United Kingdom) Phyllis Satterthwaite	6–4, retired.
121.	Win	25‑Feb‑1924	Monte Carlo Championships	Clay	(United Kingdom) Phyllis Satterthwaite	6–2, 6–2
32.	Loss	3‑Mar‑1924	Riviera Championships	Clay	(France) Suzanne Lenglen	5–7, 1–6
122.	Win	17‑Mar‑1924	Côte d'Azur Championships	Clay	(Spain) Lilí de Álvarez	6–3, 6–3
123.	Win	24‑Mar‑1924	Cannes Championships	Clay	(Spain) Lilí de Álvarez	w.o.
124.	Win	21‑Apr‑1924	British Hard Court Championships	Clay	(United Kingdom) Geraldine Beamish	6–2, 6–2
125.	Win	12‑May‑1924	Hendon Spring Hard Courts	Clay	(United Kingdom) Honor Woolrych	6–4, 3–6, 6–2
126.	Win	19‑May‑1924	Surrey Grass Court Championships	Grass	(United Kingdom) Aurea Edgington	6–3, 6–4
33.	Loss	26‑May‑1924	Middlesex Championships	Grass	(United Kingdom) Kathleen McKane Godfree	6–4, 6–4
127.	Win	2‑Jun‑1924	North London Championships	Grass	(United Kingdom) Phyllis Covell	6–2, 6–2
128.	Win	9‑Jun‑1924	Kent Championships	Grass	(United Kingdom) Kitty Godfree	6–8, 6–1, 6–1
129.	Win	16‑Jun‑1924	London Championships	Grass	(United Kingdom) Doris Craddock	6–1, 6–4
130.	Win	7‑Jul‑1924	Welsh Championships	Grass	(United Kingdom) Edith Hannam	6–3, 6–3
131.	Win	15‑Jul‑1924	Nottinghamshire Championships	Grass	(United Kingdom) Geraldine Beamish	6–3, 6–1
132.	Win	22‑Jul‑1924	Midland Counties Championships	Grass	(United Kingdom) Phyllis Satterthwaite	6–2, 6–4
133.	Win	28‑Jul‑1924	Shanklin Open	Grass	(United Kingdom) Joyce Coote	6–1, 6–3
134.	Win	4‑Aug‑1924	Sandown Open	Grass	(United Kingdom) Evelyn Dewhurst	6–1, 6–1
135.	Win	11‑Aug‑1924	West Worthing Open	Grass	(United Kingdom) Phoebe Holcroft Watson	6–2, 6–0
136.	Win	18‑Aug‑1924	West Sussex Championships	Grass	(United Kingdom) N. Harries	6–1, 6–1
137.	Win	25‑Aug‑1924	Budleigh Salterton Open	Grass	(United Kingdom) Dorothy Shepherd	6–2, 6–2
34.	Loss	1‑Sep‑1924	Le Touquet International Championship	Clay	(Spain) Lilí de Álvarez	1–6, 1–6
138.	Win	8‑Sep‑1924	Le Touquet (Second Meeting)	Clay	(Spain) Lilí de Álvarez	7–5, 6–1
35.	Loss	15‑Sep‑1924	Gleneagles Hard Court Championships	Clay	(United Kingdom) Dorothy Shepherd	6–1, 6–8, 4–6
139.	Win	27‑Sep‑1924	Felixstowe Hard Courts Championship	Clay	(United Kingdom) Ermyntrude Harvey	6–0, 7–5
140	Win	6‑Oct‑1924	Torquay Open (2nd)	Clay	(United Kingdom) Ermyntrude Harvey	6–4, 6–1
141.	Win	18‑Oct‑1924	Torbay Country Club Tournament	Clay	(India) Nora Polley	6–4, 6–2
142.	Win	22‑Dec‑1924	Cannes Metropole Hotel Championship (2nd)	Clay	(United Kingdom) Phyllis Satterthwaite	6–2, 6–4
143.	Win	29‑Dec‑1924	Cannes Beau-Site (NY Meeting)	Clay	(United Kingdom) Margaret Tripp	6–2, 6–4
144.	Win	5‑Jan‑1925	Cannes Carlton Club (NY Meeting)	Clay	(United Kingdom) Betty Crundall-Punnett	6–2, 6–3
145.	Win	12‑Jan‑1925	Cannes Club Tournament	Clay	(Switzerland) Leslie Aeschlimann	6–3, 6–3
146.	Win	19‑Jan‑1925	Cannes Gallia Club Championship	Clay	(United Kingdom) Geraldine Beamish	8–6, 6–3
147.	Win	26‑Jan‑1925	Cannes Metropole Hotel Championship	Clay	(United Kingdom) Geraldine Beamish	7–5, 6–3
148.	Win	9‑Feb‑1925	Cannes Carlton Club Championship	Clay	(United Kingdom) Geraldine Beamish	6–3, 7–5
149.	Win	16‑Feb‑1925	Beaulieu Championships (Note: Organised by Beaulieu LTC early editions staged at the Hotel Bristoll, Also known as the Bristol Tournament, later known as the Beaulieu International Championships, Beaulieu-sur-Mer, France.)	Clay	(United Kingdom) Geraldine Beamish	6–0, 6–1
150.	Win	2‑Mar‑1925	Riviera Championships	Clay	(United Kingdom) Honor Woolrych	3–6, 6–0, 6–2
151.	Win	13‑Apr‑1925	British Hard Court Championships	Clay	(United Kingdom) Joan Fry	6–2, 6–2
152.	Win	27‑Apr‑1925	West Side Country Club Hard Courts	Clay	(United Kingdom) Madge List	6–1, 6–1
153.	Win	4‑May‑1925	London Botanical Society Tournament	Clay	(United Kingdom) Joan Fry	6–0, 7–5
154.	Win	18‑May‑1925	Surrey Grass Court Championships	Grass	(United Kingdom) Kitty Godfree	7–9, 6–1, 6–3
155.	Win	1-Jun‑1925	Northern Championships	Grass	(United Kingdom) Joan Strawson	6–4, 6–3
156.	Win	8‑Jun‑1925	Kent Championships	Grass	(United Kingdom) Geraldine Beamish	4–6, 6–3, 6–2
157.	Win	15‑Jun‑1925	London Championships	Grass	(United Kingdom) Ermyntrude Harvey	6–0, 6–1
158.	Win	27‑Jul‑1925	Seabright Invitational Tournament	Grass	(United States) Helen Wills	6–3, 6–3
159.	Win	25‑Aug‑1925	Longwood Invitational	Grass	(United Kingdom) Joan Fry	6–1, 6–1
160.	Win	1‑Oct‑1925	Longwood Bowl (Fall Open)	Grass	(United States) Anna Godfrey	6–2, 6–2
161.	Win	5‑Oct‑1925	Hot Springs Fall Tournament	Hard	(United States) Grace Leroy	6–0, 6–1
162.	Win	24‑Oct‑1925	Mexican Championships	Clay	(United States) Molla Mallory	6–8, 6–3, 6–2
163.	Win	1‑Mar‑1926	Women's Championships of Florida	Clay	(United States) Mary Browne	6–4, 6–0
164.	Win	7‑Mar‑1926	Dixie Championships	Clay	(United States) Mary Browne	6–3, 8–6
165.	Win	15‑Mar‑1926	U.S. Covered Court Championships	(Wood i)	(United States) Marion Jessup	1–6, 6–2, 6–3
166.	Win	29‑Mar‑1926	South Atlantic States Championships		(United States) Charlotte Hosmer	4–6, 6–3, 6–4
167.	Win	21‑Jul‑1926	Longwood Invitational	Grass	(United States) Martha Bayard	6–0, 3–6, 6–3
168.	Win	26‑Jul‑1926	Essex Women's Championships	Grass	(United States) Eleanor Goss	6–0, 6–3
169.	Win	2‑Aug‑1926	Seabright Invitational Tournament	Grass	(United States) Helen Wills	6–4, 6–1
36.	Loss	15‑Aug‑1926	U.S. National Championships	Grass	(Norway) Molla Mallory	4–6, 6–4, 9–7
170.	Win	6‑Sep‑1926	Middle States Championships	Grass	(United States) Hazel Hotchkiss Wightman	6–3, 6–2
171.	Win	27‑Sep‑1926	Longwood Autumn Tournament	Grass	(United States) Hazel Hotchkiss Wightman	6–3, 6–4
37.	Loss	4‑Oct‑1926	Hot Springs Fall Tournament	Hard	(Norway) Molla Mallory	7–5, 5–7, 6–3
172.	Win	24‑Jan‑1927	Cannes New Courts Club International	Clay	(United Kingdom) Phyllis Satterthwaite	6–3, 10–8
173.	Win	31‑Jan‑1927	Cannes Gallia Club Championship	Clay	(United Kingdom) Eileen Bennett	4–6, 6–4, 6–3
174.	Win	14‑Feb‑1927	Beaulieu Championships (Note: Organised by Beaulieu LTC early editions staged at the Hotel Bristol, Also known as the Bristol Tournament, later known as the Beaulieu International Championships, Beaulieu-sur-Mer, France.)	Clay	(United Kingdom) Phyllis Satterthwaite	6–4, 6–4
175.	Win	21‑Feb‑1927	Monte Carlo Championships	Clay	(United Kingdom) Phyllis Satterthwaite	6–3, 6–4
176.	Win	28‑Feb‑1927	Riviera Championships	Clay	(United Kingdom) Dorothy Shaw	6–4, 7–5
177.	Win	7‑Mar‑1927	Bordighera Championship	Clay	(United Kingdom) Sylvia Lumley Ellis	6–3, 6–3
178.	Win	23‑May‑1927	Middlesex Championships	Grass	(United Kingdom) Joan Fry	6–0, 4–6, 6–2
38.	Loss	30‑May‑1927	North London Championships	Grass	(United States) Helen Wills	2–6, 2–6
179.	Win	4‑Jul‑1927	Leicestershire Championships	Grass	(United Kingdom) Elsa Haylock	6–0, 6–1
180.	Win	18‑Jul‑1927	Winchester Open	Grass	(United Kingdom) Phyllis Satterthwaite	default
181.	Win	25‑Jul‑1927	Shanklin Open	Grass	(United Kingdom) Katherine Lewis	6–0, 6–0
182.	Win	22‑Aug‑1927	Wimereux International	Clay	(France) Simone Barbier	6–3, 6–3
183.	Win	6‑Sep‑1927	Venice Lido Tournament	Clay	(United States) Maud Levi	6–0, 6–1
184.	Win	16‑Sep‑1927	Stresa International	Clay	(Italy) Rosetta Gagliardi	6–3, 6–1
185.	Win	23‑Sep‑1927	Cernobbio Tournament	Clay	(Italy) Giulia Perelli	6–0, 6–0
186.	Win	6‑Oct‑1927	Merano International	Clay	(Germany) Ilse Friedleben	6–0, 6–1
187.	Win	2‑Jan‑1928	Juan-les-Pins Championship	Clay	(United Kingdom) Thelma Cazelet	6–1, 6–1
39.	Loss	16‑Jan‑1928	Cannes New Courts Club Tournament	Clay	(United Kingdom) Eileen Bennett	4–6, 2–6
188.	Win	23‑Jan‑1928	Cannes Metropole Championship	Clay	(United Kingdom) Phyllis Satterthwaite	6–1, 6–1
40.	Loss	31‑Jan‑1928	Cannes Gallia Club Championship	Clay	(United Kingdom) Eileen Bennett	6–8, 3–6
189.	Win	6‑Feb‑1928	Cannes Carlton Club International	Clay	(France) Hélène Contostavlos	6–3, 1–6, 6–0
190.	Win	13‑Feb‑1928	Nice	Clay	(United Kingdom) Eileen Bennett	6–4, 6–2
191.	Win	20‑Feb‑1928	Beaulieu Championships (Note: Organised by Beaulieu LTC early editions staged at the Hotel Bristoll, Also known as the Bristol Tournament, later known as the Beaulieu International Championships, Beaulieu-sur-Mer, France.)	Clay	(United Kingdom) Phyllis Satterthwaite	6–2, 6–0
192.	Win	12‑Mar‑1928	Bordighera Championship	Clay	(Italy) Lucia Valerio	6–4, 6–1
193.	Win	19‑Mar‑1928	Italian Riviera Championships	Clay	(Italy) Lucia Valerio	6–4 6–4
194.	Win	26‑Mar‑1928	Cannes Championships	Clay	(Germany) Cilly Aussem	6-0 6-2
195.	Win	16‑Apr‑1928	Melbury Club Hard Court Tournament	Clay	(United Kingdom) Geraldine Beamish	6–1, 6–1
196.	Win	7‑May‑1928	Royal Botanic Society Hard Court Tournament	Clay	(United Kingdom) Sylvia Lumley Ellis [GBR]	6–2, 6–1
197.	Win	14‑May‑1928	West Kensington Hard Court Tournament	Clay	(United Kingdom) Ermyntrude Harvey	6–1, 6–2
198.	Win	25‑May‑1928	Berlin International Championships	Clay	(Germany) Toni Schomburgk	6–3, 6–3
199.	Win	4‑Jun‑1928	North London Championships	Grass	(Australia) Esna Boyd	6–3, 6–0
200.	Win	11‑Jun‑1928	Kent Championships	Grass	(United Kingdom) Violet Chamberlain	6–2, 10–8
201.	Win	9‑Jul‑1928	Championships of Bavaria	Clay	(Germany) Ilse Friedleben	6–0, 2–6, 6–4
41.	Loss	16‑Jul‑1928	Düsseldorf International	Clay	(Germany) Cilly Aussem	5-7, 4-6
202.	Win	23‑Jul‑1928	Pforzheim International	Clay	(Germany) Ilse Friedleben	6–0, 6–4
203.	Win	20‑Aug‑1928	Wimereux International	Clay	(France) Simone Barbier	6–2, 7–5
39.	Loss	3‑Sep‑1928	Le Touquet International Championship	Clay	(Spain) Lilí de Álvarez	0–6, 3–6
42.	Loss	11‑Feb‑1929	All India Championships	Grass	(India) Jenny Sandison	w.o.
43.	Loss	13‑May‑1929	West Kensington Hard Court Tournament	Clay	(United Kingdom) Phoebe Holcroft Watson	3–6, 1–6
44.	Loss	20‑May‑1929	Surrey Grass Court Championships	Grass	(United Kingdom) Betty Nuthall	5–7, 1–6
204.	Win	7‑Jun‑1929	London Championships	Grass	(United Kingdom) Elsie Pittman	6–2, 2–6, 6–2
205.	Win	15‑Jul‑1929	Nottinghamshire Championships	Grass	(United Kingdom) Geraldine Beamish	6–4, 6–0
206.	Win	3‑Sep‑1929	Le Touquet International Championship	Clay	(Belgium) Josane Sigart	6–1, 6–2
207.	Win	9‑Sep‑1929	Venice Lido Tournament	Clay	(France) Simone Barbier	6–3, 6–4
208.	Win	23‑Dec‑1929	Cannes Beau-Site (New Year Meeting)		(France) Sylvia Henrotin	6–3, 1–6, 6–3
209.	Win	30‑Dec‑1930	Cannes Metropole Hotel Championship	Clay	(United Kingdom) Phyllis Satterthwaite	6–2, 2–5, retd.
210.	Win	6‑Jan‑1930	Monaco Championships	Clay	(United Kingdom) Phyllis Satterthwaite	6–3, 6–4
211.	Win	13‑Jan‑1930	Monte Carlo Club Championships	Clay	(United Kingdom) Phyllis Satterthwaite	6–3, 6–0
212.	Win	20‑Jan‑1930	Cannes New Courts Club Championship	Clay	(Italy) Lucia Valerio	6–2, 2–6, 6–0
213.	Win	27‑Jan‑1930	Cannes Gallia Club Championship	Clay	(France) Sylvia Henrotin	6–3, 6–2
214.	Win	3‑Feb‑1930	Cannes Carlton Club Championship	Clay	(France) Sylvia Henrotin	w.o.
45.	Loss	10‑Mar‑1930	Nice Lawn Tennis Club Championships	Clay	(France) Simonne Mathieu	4–6, 5–7
215.	Win	31‑Mar‑1930	Saint Raphael Lawn Tennis Club Championship	Clay	(Czechoslovakia) Albina Korotvičková	6–0, 6–1
216.	Win	7‑Apr‑1930	Juan-les-Pins Championship	Clay	(Germany) Cilly Aussem	6–2, 7–5
46.	Loss	22‑Apr‑1930	Lake Geneva Championships	Clay	(Germany) Cilly Aussem	w.o.
.	?	28‑Apr‑1930	Montreux-Palace LTC Championships	Clay	(Germany) Hilde Krahwinkel	(Note: Organised by Montreux-Palace LTC. Montreux, Switzerland Ryan defeated Anne Peitz (Ger) 7-5, 6-2 in her semi final, Krahwinkel defeated Lolette Payot (SUI) in her semi final results of final not known.)
217.	Win	5‑May‑1930	Zurich International	Clay	(Switzerland) Lolette Payot	4–6, 6–3, 6–3
218.	Win	12‑May‑1930	Lucerne International	Clay	(Germany) Ilse Friedleben	6–2, 6–3
219.	Win	2‑Jun‑1930	North London Championships	Grass	(United States) Sarah Palfrey Cooke	6–1, 8–6
47.	Loss	23‑Jun‑1930	Wimbledon Championships	Grass	(United States) Helen Wills	2–6, 2–6
220.	Win	11‑Jul‑1930	Bavarian Championships	Clay	(Germany) Klara Beutter Hammer	6–3, 6–3
221.	Win	14‑Jul‑1930	Semmering International	Clay	(Germany) Toni Schomburgk	6–2, 6–0
222.	Win	1‑Sep‑1930	Le Touquet International Championship	Clay	(France) Colette Bernard	6–0, 6–1
223.	Win	8‑Sep‑1930	Le Touquet (2nd Meeting)	Clay	(United Kingdom) Olga Haycraft	6–1, 6–0
48.	Loss	22‑Dec‑1930	Juan-les-Pins International Championships	Clay	(United Kingdom) Muriel Thomas	2–6, 1–6
224.	Win	29‑Dec‑1930	Cannes Beau-Site (NY Meeting)	Clay	(United Kingdom) Phyllis Satterthwaite	4–6, 8–6, 6–1
225.	Win	2‑Feb‑1931	Cannes Carlton Club International Championship	Clay	(United Kingdom) Phyllis Satterthwaite	6–2, 6–4
226.	Win	6‑Apr‑1931	Genoa Championships	Clay	(Czechoslovakia) Greta Deutschová	6–4, 6–3
49.	Loss	4‑May‑1931	London Hard Court Championships	Clay	(United Kingdom) Elsie Pittman	9–11, 4–6
227.	Win	8‑Sep‑1931	Monte Carlo Country Club (Summer Tournament)	Clay	(United Kingdom) Muriel Thomas	8–6 6–1
228.	Win	14‑Sep‑1931	Cannes New Courts (Summer Tournament)	Clay	(Netherlands) V.B. Taunay	6–1, 6–1
229.	Win	28‑Sep‑1931	Provençal LTC Summer Tournament	Clay	(United Kingdom) Muriel Thomas	6–2, 6–0
230.	Win	11‑Jan‑1932	Monegasque Championships	Clay	(United Kingdom) Phyllis Satterthwaite	6–1, 6–3
231.	Win	18‑Jan‑1932	Prince de Kutch Cup (Note: It was a sub-tournament within the Mediterranean Championships that were played at the Cannes New Courts Club. It featured only 4 players who played for the Kutch Cup)	Clay	(United Kingdom) Muriel Thomas	6–2, 6–1
232.	Win	25‑Jan‑1932	Cannes Gallia Club Championship	Clay	(Italy) Lucia Valerio	6–3, 6–3
233.	Win	1‑Feb‑1932	Cannes Carlton Club International	Clay	(Italy) Elsa Riboli	6–2, 6–1
234.	Win	9‑Feb‑1932	South France Championships	Clay	(United Kingdom) Phyllis Satterthwaite	6–3, 1–6, 6–2
235.	Win	15‑Feb‑1932	Beaulieu Championships	Clay	(United Kingdom) Phyllis Satterthwaite	6–0, 6–4
236.	Win	1‑Aug‑1932	Livorno International	Clay	(United Kingdom) Rosie Berthet	7–5, 6–4
50.	Loss	1‑Aug‑1932	Salzburg International Championships	Clay	(Weimar Republic) Paula von Reznicek	6–8, 6–4, 4–6
237.	Win	14‑Aug‑1932	Rimini International	Clay	(Italy) Vittoria Tonolli	6–3, 6–1
51.	Loss	20‑Feb‑1933	Beaulieu Championships	Clay	(United Kingdom) Peggy Scriven-Vivian	3–6, 13–11, 4–6
238.	Win	25‑Mar‑1933	Alassio International	Clay	(Italy) Ucci Manzutto	6–2, 6–0
52.	Loss	2‑Apr‑1933	Internazionale di Rapollo (Note: Played at the Circolo Golf e Tennis.)	Clay	(Germany) Marie Louise Horn	7–5, 6–4
53.	Loss	10‑Apr‑1933	Rome Championships (Note: Played at the TC Parioli.)	Clay	(Germany) Lolette Payot	4–6, 1–6
239.	Win	17‑Apr‑1933	Naples International Championships	Clay	(France) Ida Adamoff	6–2, 6–4
240.	Win	1‑May‑1933	Internazionale di Firenze	Clay	(Italy) Anna Luzzatti	6–2, 6–2
241.	Win	9‑May‑1933	International Italian Championships	Clay	(France) Ida Adamoff	6–1, 6–1
242.	Win	26‑Mar‑1934	Alassio International	Clay	(Germany) Cilly Aussem	6–3, 6–4
243.	Win	9‑Apr‑1934	Internazionale di Rapollo	Clay	(Germany) Cilly Aussem	6–1, 6–2
54.	Loss	16‑Apr‑1934	Italian International Championships	Clay	(Germany) Cilly Aussem	3–6, 6–4, 2–6
244.	Win	29‑Apr‑1934	Czechoslovakian International Championships	Clay	(Czechoslovakia) Lola Merhautová	6–3, 6–3
55.	Loss	16‑May‑1934	Berlin International Championships	Clay	(Germany) Marie Louise Horn	2–6, 3–6

== Career splits ==
Split	Matches	W–L	%	Sets	W–L	%	Games	W–L	%
Hard Courts	3	2–1	66.7%	7	5–2	71.4%	66	40-26	60.6%
Clay Courts	631	571–60	90.5%	1293	1147–146	88.7%	10632	7469–3163	70.3%
Grass courts	441	415–26	94.1%	926	836-90	90.3%	7907	5395–2152	90.3%
Wood courts (i)	13	11–2	84.6%	29	23–6	79.3%	248	159-89	64.1%
Majors	76	59–17	77.6%	172	26–46	73.3%	1519	911–608	60.0%
Finals	299	244–55	81.6%	551	431–120	78.2%	4771	2998–1773	62.8%
Career	1158	1064–94	91.9%	2399	2140–259	89.2%	19623	13883–5740	70.7%
