= Vladimir Landau =

Monegasque tennis player (1902–1971)

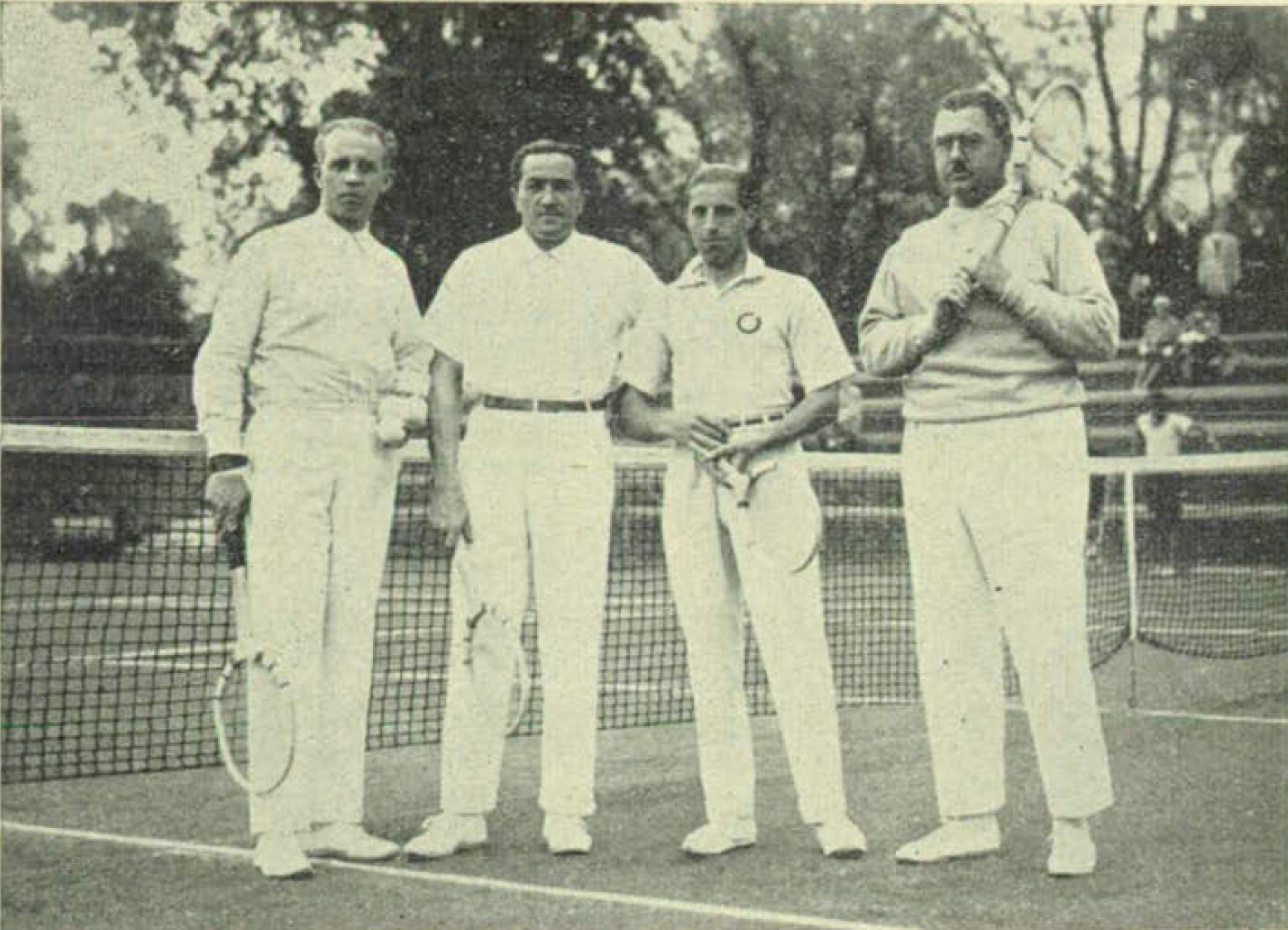
- From left: Jenő Pétery, Béla von Kehrling, Landau and René Gallèpe in the Hungary-Monaco 1929 Davis Cup tie
- Country (sports): Monaco
- Born: March 29, 1902; Petrograd, Russian Empire
- Died: September 24, 1971 (aged 69); Hannover, West Germany
- Plays: right-handed

Singles

Grand Slam singles results
- French Open: 3R (1929, 1930)
- Wimbledon: 2R (1930)

Doubles

Grand Slam doubles results
- French Open: 2R (1929, 1934)
- Wimbledon: 2R (1931)

Mixed doubles

Grand Slam mixed doubles results
- Wimbledon: 3R (1930)

Team competitions
- Davis Cup: Europe QF (1947)
- Last updated on: November 15, 2012.

Vladimir Maximilianovich Landau (Russian: Владимир Максимилиа́нович Ланда́у, IPA: [vlɐˈdʲimʲɪr məksʲɪmʲɪlʲɪˈanəvʲɪtɕ lɐnˈdaʊ]; March 29 [O.S. March 16] 1902 – September 24, 1971) was a Russian-born Monegasque tennis player. In 1931 he was the 14th on the French rankings, which included players of all nationality provided that they played in and represented a French sports club.

== Early life and family ==
Vladimir Landau was born on March 29, 1902, in Petrograd to Maximilien Landau and Anna Herzenberg. He had a sister Alice who was a ballet dancer under the pseudonym Alice Nikitina. After World War I the family moved to Monaco.

== Tennis career ==
In 1928 Landau reached the quarterfinal of the doubles tournament at the Monaco Championships alongside Ludwig von Salm Hoogstraten. The next year he was defeated in the doubles final of the Beaulieu LTC tournament, partnering with László Dörner of Romania. In the same year he played a major part in the first ever Davis Cup tie. After a Monaco team victory against the Swiss team, he advanced into the second round where he faced Hungary in Budapest. Although the team lost, Landau scored both victories for his team. In the 1930 French Championships he was the eleventh seed and was eliminated in the third round. At the Beausite Club de Cannes Cup in January 1931, he won the doubles contest with his teammate Hillyard. A month later he won a triple crown at the Monte Carlo Country Club tournament, beating Hillyard in singles, partnering with him for the doubles victory against Garcia and Chastel, and clinching the mixed doubles with the British Phyllis Satterthwaite against Garcia and Richards. In March he was a runner-up in the Bordighera Championship doubles, partnering with Béla von Kehrling and only losing to the Irish-Italian duo of George Lyttleton-Rogers and Alberto del Bono. In May, in an unofficial challenge between the Davis Cup teams of Monaco and the Netherlands, his team claimed a win with Landau's back-to-back victories over Jan van der Heide and Ody Koopman in two singles and a doubles.

In the first tournament of the 1932 season in Beaulieu, Landau and Irish champion Lyttleton-Rogers earned the doubles title after a five-set battle. In 1934 he ceded the Monegasque Championships to Charles Aeschlimann in straight sets. In 1936 at the Menton tournament, he lost to Norcross Tilney in the semifinals. In January 1937 he won the Beausite LTC doubles trophy with Kho Sin Kie, but lost to Kho in the singles final after a five-set battle, with Kho ending the match with a love-set. He also reached the final of the mixed doubles with Simonne Mathieu. In February at the Carlton-Cannes tournaments, he aligned with Merricks and lost the mixed semifinals to Weiwers and Karstend. In September in Menton, in the semifinal encounter between him and compatriot Gaston Médécin, he was beaten in two sets. Landau and Médécin also won the doubles title together.

In the Davis Cup, Landau played 15 ties between 1929 and 1947, and compiled an 11 to 30 win record.

== Controversies ==
In April 1947 Landau was summoned to court and to testify in the case of an English woman named Edna Clayton, who was accused of breaching the Defence Finance regulations. While Clayton was vacationing in Monte Carlo, she ran out of money, and after borrowing some from her host friend she still needed to pay for her trip back to England. The friend called for Landau who offered to lend her money. Although her cheque was post-dated, he gave her £50 at an unusually high exchange rate. This deception was revealed to be related to Max Intrator or "Palestine Max", an international warrant smuggler and cheque fraud who was arrested in the same month, and who indirectly cashed cheques worth more than £75, the limit that the post-war UK Treasury allowed to be spent abroad. People who accepted cheques from British subjects in Europe on behalf of Intrator were believed to be aware of the currency crime circle and thus were prosecuted.

== Personal life ==
After World War II, Landau worked as a secretary of the Monte Carlo Tennis Club. He married Janine Marie-Louise Regnart on January 26, 1945, in Paris. The same year their son Patrick Landau was born, who later also became a tennis player and member of the Monaco Davis Cup team. Later Patrick was drafted to the US Junior Davis Cup team, where he was coached by his father who was the team captain. He studied at Brigham Young University where he trained with the BYU Cougars. There he was the Western Athletic Conference tennis singles and team champion. He was also the singles and doubles champion of Monaco, Durham doubles champion and runner-up in the French Junior Championships. Vladimir died on September 24, 1971, in Hannover and was buried in Monaco five weeks later.
