= Cannes Championships =

Cannes Championships Championnats de Cannes

Defunct tennis tournament
- Tour: ILTF Circuit
- Founded: 1897; 129 years ago
- Abolished: 1975; 51 years ago
- Location: Cannes, France
- Venue: Beau Site TC (1897–1939); Cannes LTC (1944–1975)
- Surface: Clay

The Cannes Championships or Championnats de Cannes also known as the Championships of Cannes was a tennis event held from 1897 originally played on outside tennis courts at the Beau Site Tennis Club at the Hôtel Beau Site in Cannes, France, following World War II it was moved to the Cannes Lawn Tennis Club due the hotel being sold for redevelopment. From 1947 the tournament occasionally carried the joint denomination of Cannes International Championships or just Cannes International the tournament ran until 1975. It was one of the main tournaments of the French Riviera tennis circuit.

== History ==
In 1868 the Hôtel Beau Site was opened it was owned by George Henri Gougoltz the original courts were grass. In 1880/1881 Renshaw brothers Ernest and William would train during the winter at the hotel. The Renshaws persuaded the owner of the Beau-Site to let them redesign the court in order to protect the lawn from the wear and tear that came with their constant play, and new clay tennis courts were also installed in the grounds of Hôtel Beau Site. In 1897 Championships of Cannes were established. From 1897 through 1939 it was originally played on outside tennis courts at the Beau Site Tennis Club at the Hôtel Beau Site in Cannes, France, following World War II it was moved to the Cannes Lawn Tennis Club due the hotel being sold for redevelopment. It continued to be held annually until 1975.

== Finals ==
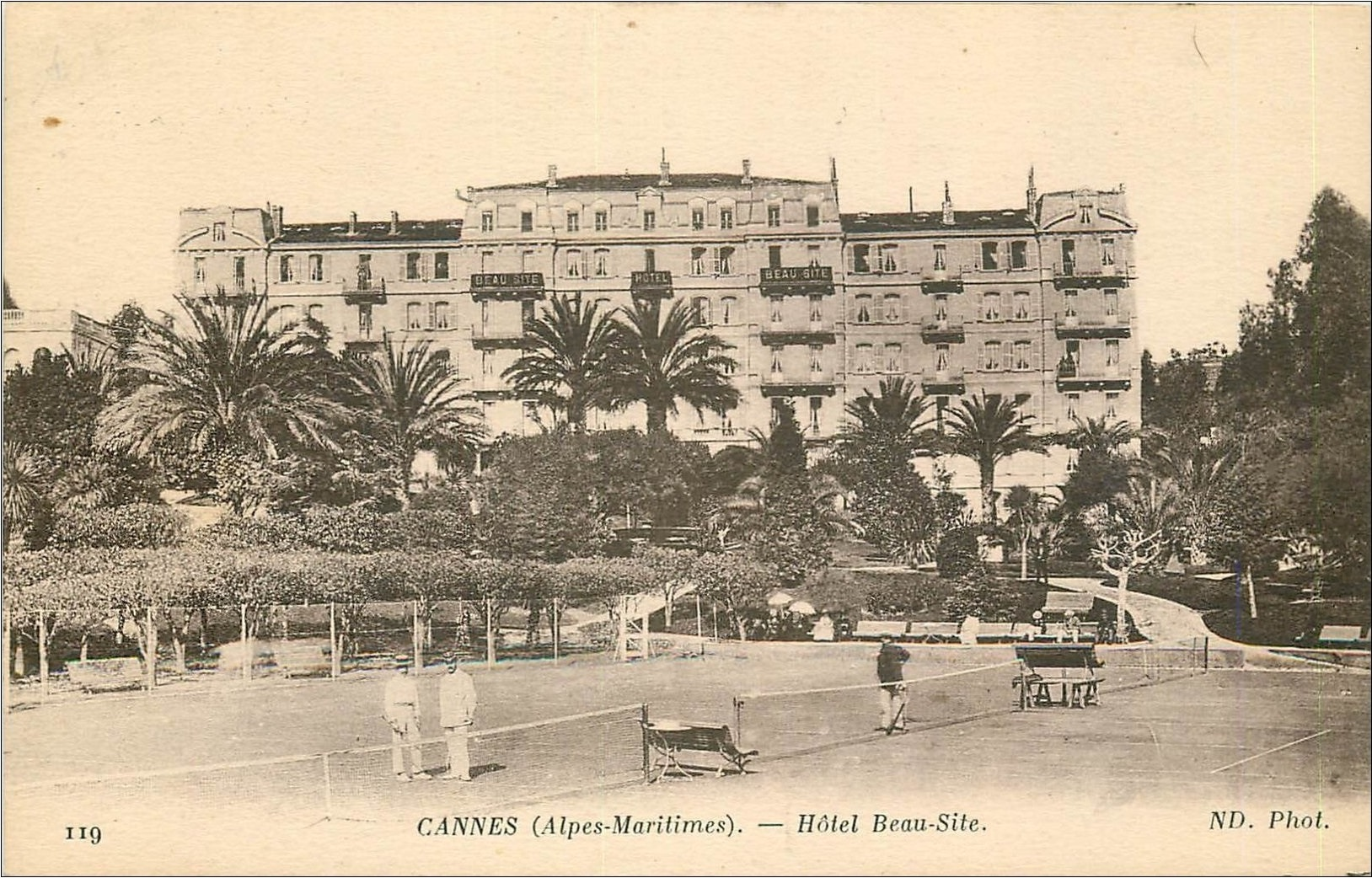
Hotel Beau Site Cannes in 1900 venue for the championships

=== Men's singles ===
In 1936 the Beau Site Tennis Club staged two Cannes Championships (for men) the first from 23 to 29 March and the second from 30 March to 5 April.

(incomplete list)

Championships of Cannes
Year	Champion	Runner-up	Score
↓ French Riviera Circuit ↓
1897	(United Kingdom) Reginald Doherty	(France) M.G. Gongoltz	6–2, 6–4, 6–3
1901	(United Kingdom) Laurence Doherty	(United Kingdom) George Hillyard	6–3, 6–3, ret.
1904	(United Kingdom) Laurence Doherty (2)	(United Kingdom) Major Ritchie	6–1, 6–4, 6–1
1905	(United Kingdom) Major Ritchie	(United Kingdom) Laurence Doherty	w.o.
1906	(New Zealand) Anthony Wilding	(United Kingdom) Wilberforce Eaves	6-2 6-1 6-3
1907	(United Kingdom) Major Ritchie (2)	(United Kingdom) Dunstan Rhodes	6-4, 6-2 ret.
1908	(New Zealand) Anthony Wilding (2)	(United Kingdom) Major Ritchie	6–3, 6–4, 6–0
1909	(United Kingdom) Major Ritchie (3)	(Germany) Friedrich Wilhelm Rahe	6–1, 4–6, 6–2, 6–2
1910	(United Kingdom) Major Ritchie (4)	(France) Max Decugis	4–6, 4–6, 8–6 ret.
1911	(New Zealand) Anthony Wilding (3)	(Germany) Friedrich Wilhelm Rahe	6–1, 6–4, 6–2
1912	(France) Max Decugis	(France) Maurice Germot	6–1, 6–2, 6–4
1913	(Germany) Friedrich Wilhelm Rahe	(Germany) Robert Kleinschroth	6–3, 6–2, 1–6 3–6, 6-0
↓ ILTF World Circuit ↓
1914	(New Zealand) Anthony Wilding (4)	(Australia) Norman Brookes	6–4, 6–2, 6–1
1915/1918	Not held (due to world war one)		
Cannes Championships
1919	(Romania) Nicolae Mishu	(France) Max Decugis	6–8, 6–4, 4–6, 6–3, 6–0
1920	(Australia) Harry Lewis-Barclay	(Australia) Frank Fisher	6–2, 7–5, 3–6, 7–9, 6–1
1921	(Italy) Mino Balbi Di Robecco	(France) Alain L. A. Resuge	6–3, 4–6, 6–1, 2–6, 7–5
1922	(France) Jean Borotra	(United Kingdom) D.L. Morgan	7–5, 6–4, 2–6, 3–6, 7–5
1923	(Canada) Henry George Mayes	(United Kingdom) Jack Hillyard	6–2, 6–1, 5–7, 6–4
1924	(France) Henri Cochet	(France) René Lacoste	7–5, 6–4, 6–4
1926	(Switzerland) Charles Aeschlimann	(United Kingdom) Gordon Lowe	6-1, 6-2
1927	(Canada) Henry George Mayes (2)	(Switzerland) Charles Aeschlimann	3–6, 6–0, 6–3, 6–1
1928	(Canada) Henry George Mayes (3)	(France) Henri Cochet	w.o.
1929	(France) Emmanuel du Plaix	(France) Paul Féret	7–5, 6–1, 4–6, 6–2
1930	(United States) Bill Tilden	(United States) Wilbur Coen	divided title
1931	(Japan) Hyotaro Sato	(Republic of Ireland) George Lyttleton-Rogers	3–6, 6–4, 6–1, 8–6
1932	(Republic of Ireland) George Lyttleton-Rogers	(Weimar Republic) Louis Haensch	2–6, 6–4, 1–6, 8–6, 9–7
1933	(Austria) Franz Matejka	(Republic of Ireland) George Lyttleton-Rogers	8–6, 3–6, 2–6, 6–3, 6–4
1934	(Italy) Giorgio de Stefani	(Switzerland) Max Ellmer	3–6, 6–1, 7–5, 6–2
1935	(Switzerland) Max Ellmer	(Austria) Franz Matejka	6–2, 6–1, 6–3
1936	(United Kingdom) Fred Perry	(Switzerland) Max Ellmer	6–2, 6–4, 6–8, 6–3
1937	(Austria) Adam Baworowski	(Switzerland) Max Ellmer	5–7, 5–7, 7–5, 6–0, 6–1
1938	(Republic of Ireland) George Lyttleton-Rogers (2)	(Sweden) Kalle Schröder	6–4, 6–3, 6–3
1939	(Poland) Adam Baworowski (2)	(France) Jean Lesueur	6–3, 4–6, 6–8, 6–1, 6–1
1940/1943	Not held (due to world war one)		
1944	(France) Pierre Pellizza	(Belgium) Jacques Peten	8-6, 6-4
1946	(France) Henri Cochet (2)	(Italy) Gianni Cucelli	6–4, 4–6, 9–7, 7–5
Cannes International Championships
1947	(Romania) Vinicius Rurac	(Romania) Cristea Caralulis	6–1, 6–4, 6–3
1948	(Hungary) József Asbóth	(United States) Sidney Wood	6–3, 6–1, 6–0
1949	(Poland) Władysław Skonecki	(Sweden) Bengt Axelsson	6–0, 6–3, 6–2
1950	(France) Philippe Chatrier	(Romania) Gheorghe Michel Sturdza	6–3, 1–6, 6–3
1951	(France) Paul Rémy	(Socialist Federal Republic of Yugoslavia) Milan Branović	4–6, 6–4, 7–5, 6–3
1952	(France) Pierre Paccard	(Spain) Jaime Bartrolí	6-4, 6-4
1953	(Hungary) József Asbóth (2)	(Brazil) Armando Vieira	7–5, 2–6, 6–1, 6–3
1954	(Southern Rhodesia) Donald Black	(Australia) Peter Molloy	6-3 6-4
1955	(United States) Tony Vincent	(France) Jean-Noël Grinda	2–6, 7–5, 6–4
1956	(United States) Budge Patty	(United States) Hugh Stewart	6–4, 6–2, 0–6, 6–3
1957	(Spain) Andrés Gimeno	(Hungary) András Ádám-Stolpa	6-3, 6-1
1958	(Egypt) Jaroslav Drobný	(France) Paul Rémy	6–4, 6–2, 3–6, 9–7
1959	(Belgium) Jacques Brichant	(United Kingdom) Billy Knight	6–4, 3–6, 0–6, 6–3, 6–3
1960	(Australia) Barry Phillips-Moore	(France) Jean Pierre Bergerat	6-1, 6-1
1961	(Colombia) Pato Álvarez	(United Kingdom) Alan Mills	3–6, 6–3, 6–3
1962	(Hungary) István Gulyás	(South Africa) Robin Sanders	6-2 4-6 7-5 6-1
1963	(Hungary) István Gulyás (2)	(Australia) Barry Geraghty	6-4, 6-0
1964	(New Zealand) Ron McKenzie	(Poland) Andrzej Licis	6-4, 6-3
1965	(Hungary) István Gulyás (3)	(Australia) Colin Stubs	6–2, 1–6, 6–0, 6–1
1966	(Australia) John Brown	(France) Jean-Loup Rouyer	7-5, 6-4
1967	(Czechoslovakia) Jan Kodeš	(Romania) Ilie Năstase	6-0, 6-1
1968	(Romania) Ion Țiriac	(Soviet Union) Alex Metreveli	6-1, 6-3
↓ Open era ↓
↓ ILTF Independent Circuit ↓
1972	(West Germany) Attila Korpás	(Hungary) Géza Varga	6-4, 7-5
1973	(Australia) Barry Phillips-Moore	(France) Patrice Beust	6-4, 6-4
1975	(Hungary) János Benyik	(Hungary) Róbert Machán	6–2, 3–6, 8–6

=== Women's singles ===
(incomplete list)
In 1951 the Cannes Lawn Tennis Club staged two Cannes International Championships (for women) the first in March denoted as (*) and the second in April denoted as (**).

nb: This is incorrect. The March event was the Cote d'Azur Championships and the April Event was the Carlton Club Championships. The Cannes International event did not happen at all in 1951.

Championships of Cannes
Year	Champion	Runner-up	Score
↓ French Riviera Circuit ↓
1904	(United Kingdom) Ruth Winch	(Germany) Clara von der Schulenburg	6-2, 7-5
1905	(United Kingdom) Connie Wilson	(Germany) Clara von der Schulenburg	6-3, 6-3
1906	(United Kingdom) Toupie Lowther	(Germany) Antonie Kusenberg Popp	6-4, 6-4
1907	(United Kingdom) Ruth Winch	(United Kingdom) Toupie Lowther	6-0, 6-1
1908	(United Kingdom) Dorothea Douglass Chambers	(United Kingdom) Melita Dillon	6-1, 6-4
1909	(Germany) Clara von der Schulenburg	(United Kingdom) Ruth Winch	w.o.
1910	(United Kingdom) Rosamund Salusbury	(United Kingdom) Ruth Winch	6-1, 6-4
1911	(Germany) Hedwig Neresheimer	(United Kingdom) Rosamund Salusbury	6–4, 8–10, 7-5
1912	(United Kingdom) Jessie Tripp	(Germany) Mieken Rieck	6-3, 6-1
1913	(United Kingdom) Jessie Tripp (2)	(United Kingdom) Miss. E. White	6–3, 4–1, ret.
↓ ILTF World Circuit ↓
1914	(United States) Elizabeth Ryan	(United Kingdom) Jessie Tripp	6-2, 6-1
1915/1918	Not held (due to world war one)		
Cannes Championships
1919	(France) Suzanne Lenglen	(France) Elisabeth d'Ayen	6-0,6-0
1920	(United States) Elizabeth Ryan (2)	(United Kingdom) Geraldine Beamish	6-2, 6-2
1921	(United Kingdom) Phyllis Howkins	(United Kingdom) Phyllis Satterthwaite	2–6, 6–1, 6–2
1922	(United States) Elizabeth Ryan (3)	(United Kingdom) Geraldine Beamish	6-4, 6-4
1923	(United Kingdom) Kitty Mckane	(United Kingdom) Geraldine Beamish	6-2, 6-2
1924	(United States) Elizabeth Ryan (4)	(Spain) Lili de Alvarez	default
1925	Abandoned (due to rain)		
1926	(Spain) Lili de Alvarez	(United Kingdom) Heather Woolrych	6-4, 6-2
1927	(Spain) Lili de Alvarez (2)	(Greece) Hélène Contostavlos	6-2, 6-3
1928	(United States) Elizabeth Ryan (5)	(Weimar Republic) Cilly Aussem	6-0, 6-2
1929	(France) Sylvia Jung Lafaurie	(United Kingdom) Phyllis Satterthwaite	6-3, 6-3
1930	(United States) Elizabeth Ryan (6)	(Weimar Republic) Paula von Reznicek	divided title
1931	(Weimar Republic) Cilly Aussem	(Switzerland) Lolette Payot	6-3, 6-3
1932	(Switzerland) Lolette Payot	(Poland) Jadwiga Jędrzejowska	9-7, 7-5
1933	(Switzerland) Lolette Payot (2)	(France) Simonne Mathieu	6–3, 4–6, 6–4
1934	(France) Jacqueline Goldschmidt	(France) Simonne Mathieu	6-4, 11-9
1935	(France) Simonne Mathieu	(United Kingdom) Kay Stammers	6-3, 6-3
1936	(France) Simonne Mathieu (2)	(France) Paulette M. de Saint-Ferreol	6-3, 6-1
1937	(Luxembourg) Alice Weiwers	(Czechoslovakia) Grete Deutschova	6-0, 6-1
1938	(Poland) Jadwiga Jędrzejowska	(Luxembourg) Alice Weiwers	6-1, 8-6
1939	(France) Simonne Mathieu (3)	(Austria) Elfi von Kriegs-Au	6-1, 6-2
1942	(Luxembourg) Alice Weiwers (2)	(France) Cosette Saint-Omer-Roy	6-4, 6-4
1943	Not held (due to world war two)		
Cannes International Championships
1947	(Romania) Magda Rurac	(Czechoslovakia) Helena Straubeova	6-3, 4-6, 6-1
1949	(Italy) Lucia Manfredi	(Luxembourg) Alice Weiwers	6-3, 6-0
1950	(Italy) Lucia Manfredi (2)	(France) Gilberte Jamain	2-6, 7-5, 6-4
1951 *	(Australia) Thelma Coyne Long	(United States) Barbara Scofield	6-3, 2-6, 6-2
1951 **	(Austria) Hella Strecker	(Czechoslovakia) Helena Matous	6-1, 6-4
1952	(United Kingdom) Joan Curry	(United Kingdom) Susan Partridge	6-3, 6-2
1954	(United Kingdom) Shirley Bloomer	(United Kingdom) Joan Curry	4-6, 7-5, 6-0
1954	(France) Anne-Marie Seghers	(France) Annie Soisbault	6-0, 6-2
1955	(Austria) Ilse Schuh Proxauf	(France) C. Triboullier	5-7, 8-6, 10-8
1956	(United Kingdom) Shirley Bloomer (2)	(West Germany) Edda Buding	6-4, 4-6, 6-4
1958	(France) Florence de la Courtie-Billat	(Belgium) Christiane Mercelis	6-3, 6-8, 8-6
1959	(Hungary) Suzy Kormozcy	(France) Florence de la Courtie-Billat	7-5, 6-1
1960	(United Kingdom) Sheila Armstrong	(United Kingdom) Vivienne Cox	6-4, 6-2
1961	(United Kingdom) Elizabeth Starkie	(United Kingdom) Pauline Titchener Roberts	8-6, 6-1
1962	(West Germany) Helga Schultze	(United Kingdom) Deidre Catt	4-6, 7-5, 6-4
1963	(France) Françoise Dürr	(United Kingdom) Carole Rosser	1-6, 6-2, 6-2
1964	(France) Jacqueline Rees-Lewis	(Italy) Roberta Beltrame	6-1, 6-2
1965	(Australia) Faye Toyne	(Australia) Trish McClenaughan	8-6, 6-0
1966	(Belgium) Ingrid Loeys	(United Kingdom) Alex Soady	6-2, 6-2
1967	(United Kingdom) Winnie Shaw	(France) Johanne Venturino	3-6, 6-3, 6-1
1967	(United States) Kathy Harter	(Sweden) Ingrid Lofdahl	6-3, 6-2
1968	(Italy) Roberta Beltrame	(Australia) Helen Gourlay	6-2, 6-4
↓ Open era ↓
1969	(Netherlands) Marijke Schaar	(Netherlands) Betty Stöve	4-6, 6-2, 6-0
1970	(United Kingdom) Jill Cooper	(United Kingdom) Veronica Burton	6-3, 6-0
1972	(France) Odile de Roubin	(Hungary) Judith Szorenyi	4-6, 6-0, 6-2

== 2nd Meeting ==
The Beau Site Tennis Club staged a second Cannes Championships from 30 March to 5 April 1936.

=== Men's singles ===
(incomplete list)

Year	Champion	Runner-up	Score
1936	(United Kingdom) Fred Perry (2)	(Switzerland) Max Ellmer	10–8, 6–2, 4–6, 6–3

== Other Beau Site tournaments ==
The Hôtel Beau Site also staged other tournaments including the Beau-Site Hotel New Year Meeting or Beau-Site Hotel First Meeting that usually ran December to January, and the Beau-Site Hotel Spring Meeting also called the Beau-Site Hotel Second Meeting that was staged in May.
