= Monaco Championships =

Championnats de Monaco Championnats Monégasques

Defunct tennis tournament
- Tour: ILTF Circuit
- Founded: 1922; 103 years ago
- Abolished: 1982; 43 years ago
- Location: Monte Carlo, Monaco
- Venue: La Festa Country Club (1922-28); Monte Carlo Country Club (1929-30); La Condamine Club (1931-60)
- Surface: Clay

The Monaco Championships or Monaco International Championships also known as the Monegasque Championships was a men's and women's clay court tennis tournament first established in 1922. The championships were first held on courts at the La Festa Country Club in Monte Carlo, Monaco. The tournament ran until 1982.

== History ==
In 1922 the Monaco Championships were established at the La Festa Country Club in Monte Carlo, Monaco, with the event being played in late December or early January as part of the French Riviera Winter Circuit. It remained at the same venue through till 1928. In 1929 the tournament was moved to the Monte Carlo Country Club until 1930. In 1931 the tournaments names was changed to the Monegasque Championships, and was moved to a new venue the La Condamine Club where it remained until 1982.

Previous winners of the men's singles title included; Jacques Brugnon, Henry George Mayes, Uberto De Morpurgo, Bill Tilden, Enrique Maier, Vladimir Landau, Kho Sin-Kie, Jean Borotra and Bernard Balleret.

== Finals ==
=== Men's singles ===
(Incomplete Roll)

Monaco Championships
Year	Champions	Runners-up	Score
1924	(India) Charles J. Brierley	(United States) Arthur M. Lovibond	6–2, 1–6, 7–5, 6–3
1925	(France) Jacques Brugnon	(United Kingdom) Donald Greig	6–4, 1–6, 6–3, 6–3
1926	(France) Jacques Brugnon (2)	(Denmark) Erik Worm	6–1, 6–1, 4–6, 4–6, 6–1
1927	(Canada) Henry Mayes	(Switzerland) Charles Aeschlimann	6–1, 6–1, 9–7
1928	Not held		
1929	(Italy) Umberto De Morpurgo	(France) Jacques Brugnon	6–3, 6–2, 6–2
1930	(United States) Bill Tilden II	(Republic of Ireland) George Lyttleton Rogers	7–5, 6–1, 6–8, 6–0
Monegasque Championships
1931	(Spain) Enrique Maier	(Austria) Hermann Artens	6–2, 5–7, 6–1, 6–3
1932	(Republic of Ireland) George Lyttleton Rogers	(Switzerland) Max Ellmer	6–4, 2–6, 9–7, 6–2
1933	(Monaco) Vladimir Landau	(France) Edmond Edouard Lotan	w.o.
1934	(Switzerland) Charles Aeschlimann	(Monaco) Vladimir Landau	6–4, 6–0, 6–4
1935	(Monaco) Vladimir Landau (2)	(Switzerland) Gaby Mercier-Odier	5–7, 6–3, 6–0, 6–4
1936	(Monaco) Gaston Médécin	(Monaco) Vladimir Landau	8–10, 6–4, 6–4, 2–6, 6–2
1937	(Republic of China (1912–1949)) Kho Sin-Kie	(Monaco) Gaston Médécin	6–3, 6–2, 6–3
1938	(Republic of China (1912–1949)) Kho Sin-Kie (2)	(Monaco) Gaston Médécin	6–1 6–0 6–3
1939	(France) Jean Borotra	(Romania) Constantin Tănăsescu	6–3, 11–9
1940	(France) Jean Borotra (2)	(Kingdom of Yugoslavia) Dragutin Mitić	6–1, 6–8, 7–5
1943	(Monaco) Alexandre-Athenase Noghès	(Monaco) Gaston Médécin	6–1, 6–8, 7–5
1944	(Monaco) Alexandre-Athenase Noghès (2)	(Belgium) Jacques Peten	2–6, 6–2, 6–4
1950	(Monaco) Alexandre-Athenase Noghès (3)	(Monaco) Georges Pasquier	6–3, 6–0, 6–0
1953	(Socialist Federal Republic of Yugoslavia) Josip Palada	(France) Pierre Forget	2–6, 6–4, 6–3
1956	(Tunisia) Mustapha Belkhodja	(France) Gil de Kermadec	2–6, 6–3, 3–6, 6–0
1960	(Monaco) Georges Pasquier	(Monaco) Roland Borghini	6–4, 5–7, 6–0, 7–5
↓ Open era ↓
1981	(Monaco) Jacques Vincileoni	(Monaco) Eric Carlier	6–4, 7–6, 6–1
1982	(Monaco) Bernard Balleret	(Monaco) Louis Borfiga	6–3, 6–4, 6–3

=== Women's singles ===
(Incomplete Roll)

Monaco Championships
Year	Champions	Runners-up	Score
1922	(United Kingdom) Phyllis Satterthwaite	(United Kingdom) Madeline Fisher O'Neill	7-5, 6-3
1923	(United Kingdom) Phyllis Satterthwaite (2)	(United Kingdom) Madeline Fisher O'Neill	w.o.
1923	(United States) Elizabeth Ryan	(United Kingdom) Phyllis Satterthwaite	3-6, 6-4, 6-4
1924	(Spain) Lili de Alvarez	(United Kingdom) Phyllis Satterthwaite	6-0, 6-1
1925	(United Kingdom) Phyllis Satterthwaite (3)	(France) Elizabeth d'Ayen Macready	divided prizes
1926	(United Kingdom) Phyllis Satterthwaite (4)	(United Kingdom) Madge Slaney	6-4, 6-3
1927	(Spain) Lili de Alvarez (2)	(United Kingdom) Phyllis Satterthwaite	w.o.
1928	Not held		
1929	(Australia) Esna Boyd	(United Kingdom) Phyllis Satterthwaite	7-5, 6-3
1930	(United States) Elizabeth Ryan (2)	(United Kingdom) Phyllis Satterthwaite	6-3, 6-4
Monegasque Championships
1931	(France) Simone Passermard Mathieu	(Germany) Cilly Aussem	7-5, 3-6, 6-4
1932	(United States) Elizabeth Ryan (3)	(United Kingdom) Phyllis Satterthwaite	6-1, 6-3
1933	(United Kingdom) Phyllis Satterthwaite (5)	(France) Edith Belliard	6-4, 7-5
1934	(France) Cosette Saint-Omer-Roy	(Monaco) Mme Lermitte	6-3, 7-5
1935	(France) Simone Passermard Mathieu	(France) Paulette de Saint-Ferréol	6-0, 6-2
1936	(France) Simone Passermard Mathieu (2)	(United Kingdom) Ida Hutchings	6-1, 6-0
1937	(France) Simone Passermard Mathieu (3)	(Bermuda) Gladys Hutchings	6-1, 6-3
1938	(France) Jeanette Poncelet	(United Kingdom) Ida Hutchings	2-6, 6-3, 6-0
1939	(Luxembourg) Alice Weiwers	(United Kingdom) Iris Hutchings	6-0, 6-3
1943	(Monaco) Mlle Rebuttati	(France) Daisy Speranza Wyns	6-4, 6-4, 6-2
1946	(Belgium) Yvonne Hoyaux Vincart	(Italy) Manuela Bologna	6–3, 6–2
1950	(Monaco) Juliette Martin Borghini	(France) Daisy Speranza Wyns	6-2, 6-3
1951	(Monaco) Juliette Martin Borghini (2)	(France) Daisy Speranza Wyns	1-6, 6-2, 6-4
1952	(Monaco) Juliette Martin Borghini (3)	(France) Daisy Speranza Wyns	6-2, 6-4
1960	(Monaco) Juliette Martin Borghini (4)	(Monaco) Monique Pasquier	6-0, 3-6, 6-3

== See also ==
- Category:National and multi-national tennis tournaments
