= Championships of Hyères =

Tennis tournament in France (1910–1930)

Championships of Hyères Championnats de Hyères

Defunct tennis tournament
- Tour: French Riviera Circuit
- Founded: 1910; 115 years ago
- Abolished: 1930; 95 years ago
- Location: Hyères, France
- Venue: Hyères Lawn Tennis Club, Hyères New Courts Tennis Club
- Surface: Clay

The Championships of Hyères or Championnats de Hyères was a men's and women's international clay court tennis tournament founded in 1910. The tournament was played at the Hyères Lawn Tennis Club, Hyères, France, as part of the French Riviera Circuit. It was played annually until 1930 when it was discontinued.

== History ==
The first Championships of Hyères were played between 31 March and 6 April 1910 at the Hyères Lawn Tennis Club located within the Golf Hôtel, Hyères, France. The championships continued to be held annually at the Hyères LTC until 1927 when it was relocated to the Hyères New Courts Tennis Club for the duration of its run in 1930 when it was discontinued.

The first winner of the men's singles title was Englands's John Mason Flavelle. The first winner of the women's singles was the Greek then later French international Régine Lidoriki Vlasto. The finals men's singles champion was Germany's Johann Philip Buss, and the final women's singles champion was France's Doris Metaxa

== Finals ==
=== Men's singles ===
(incomplete list)

Year	Champion	Runner-up	Score
1910	(United Kingdom) John Mason Flavelle	(France) Antoine P. Vlasto	6–2, 6–4 ret.
1911	(United Kingdom) Fredric Samuel Warburg	(France) Pierre Blanchenay	w.o.
1912	(Austria-Hungary) Ludwig von Salm-Hoogstraeten	(France) Henri Armand Resuge	8–6, 6–4, 6–2
1913	(United Kingdom) Hope Crisp	(France) Alain Léon André Resuge	6–0, 6–1
1914	(United Kingdom) Francis Gordon Lowe	(United Kingdom) Arthur Wallis Myers	w.o.
1915/1919	Not held (due to world war one)		
1920	(United Kingdom) Francis Gordon Lowe (2)	(France) Alain Gerbault	6–4, 6–0, 6–1
1921	(United Kingdom) Francis Gordon Lowe (3)	(United Kingdom) Jack Montagu Hillyard	6–1, 6–0, 4–0, ret.
1922	(France) Alain Léon André Resuge	(United Kingdom) Jack Montagu Hillyard	6–1, 6–4, 8–6
1923	(United Kingdom) Jack Montagu Hillyard	(United Kingdom) Brame Hillyard	4–6, 6–3, 6–3, 6–3
1924	(United Kingdom) Jack Montagu Hillyard (2)	(United Kingdom) Ernest Talbot Thomas Lamb	4–6, 6–4, 3–6, 6–2, 6–4
1925	(France) Jean-Bernard Jauréguiberry	(United Kingdom) Eric Harvey	6–3, 5–7, 2–6, 6–3, 6–3
1926	Not held		
1928	(France) Jacques Brugnon	(Austria) Franz-Wilhelm Matejka	5–7, 4–6, 8–6, 6–4, 6–2
1929	(Germany) Johann Philip Buss	(France) Henri Reynaud	5–7, 6–2, 6–4, 6–2
1930	(Germany) Johann Philip Buss (2)	(France) Henri Reynaud	5–7, 6–2, 6–4, 6–2

=== Women's singles ===
(incomplete list)

Year	Champion	Runner-up	Score
1910	(France) Régine Lidoriki Vlasto	(United Kingdom) Mrs J.B. Perrett	4–6, 6–3, 6–1
1911	(United Kingdom) Emmeline Ward Warburg	(France) Régine Lidoriki Vlasto	6–4, 4–6, 6–2
1912	(United Kingdom) Mrs J.B. Perrett	(United Kingdom) Helen Reckitt Flavelle	6–4, 6–2
1913	(United Kingdom) E.M. White	(United Kingdom) M. Towler	6–2, 6–4
1914	(United Kingdom) E.M. White (2)	(United States) Elizabeth Ryan	5–1, retd.
1915/1919	Not held (due to world war one)		
1920	(United Kingdom) Geraldine Beamish	(United Kingdom) Mary Macartney	6–0, 6–0
1921	(United Kingdom) Blanche Colston	(United Kingdom) Phyllis Satterthwaite	default
1922	(United Kingdom) Phyllis Satterthwaite	(United Kingdom) Madeline Fisher O'Neill	6–2, 6–1
1923	(United Kingdom) Phyllis Satterthwaite (2)	(United Kingdom) Lesley Cadle	6–0, 6–1
1924	(United Kingdom) Phyllis Satterthwaite (3)	(United Kingdom) Phyllis Howkins Covell	6–3, 6–1
1925	(France) Cosette Saint-Omer-Roy	(France) Claude Garfit	6–3, 6–1
1926	Not held		
1927	(United Kingdom) Mary Harland	(United Kingdom) Betty Lewis	6–1, 6–1
1928	(Australia) Esna Boyd	(United Kingdom) Phyllis Satterthwaite	8–6 ret.
1929	(France) Doris Metaxa	(France) Régine Vlasto	6–3, 3–6, 6–2
