= Italian Riviera Championships =

Defunct tennis tournament
- Founded: 1903; 122 years ago
- Abolished: 1964; 61 years ago
- Location: San Remo, Liguria, Northern Italy
- Venue: Tennis Club Sanremo
- Surface: Clay

The Italian Riviera Championships also known as the San Remo International was a combined men's and women's clay court tennis tournament founded in 1903 at San Remo, Liguria, Northern Italy. The tournament was staged at the Tennis Club Sanremo (f.1897) until 1964, and was part of the Italian Riviera circuit of tennis tournaments.

== History ==
The Italian Riviera Championships (San Remo) were established in 1903. The championships were on regularly occasions the opening event at the start of the Italian clay court season. From 1956 until 1962 it was staged only twice. In 1964 the tournament was discontinued due to funding issues.

Former winners of the men's singles included; Major Ritchie (1903), Anthony Wilding (1908, 1912), Erik Worm (1927, 1930), Jean Lesueur (1931, 1933–1934), Gottfried von Cramm (1940), Dick Savitt (1951) Jaroslav Drobný (1955), and Nicola Pietrangeli (1960, 1963). The women's single was previously won by Dorothy Holman (1925), Elizabeth Ryan (1924, 1928), Lucia Valerio (1929, 1932), Pauline Betz (1947), Doris Hart (1951) Shirley Bloomer (1955), and Almut Sturm (1964).

== Venue ==
The Italian Riviera Championships was held at the Tennis and Bridge Club San Remo, (f.1897) today known as Tennis Sanremo.

== Finals ==
=== Men's singles ===
(incomplete roll)

Year	Winner	Runner-up	Score
1903	(United Kingdom) Major Ritchie	(United Kingdom) Roy Allen	6–3, 6–1, 6–3
1908	(New Zealand) Anthony Wilding	(United Kingdom) M. Turton	6–0, 6–0, 6–1
1909	(United States) Artemas Holmes	(United Kingdom) George S. Smythe	6–3, 6–3, 6–1
1910	(United States) Artemas Holmes (2)	(United Kingdom) Herbert Bird Routledge	6–0, 6–1, 6–0
1911	(New Zealand) Anthony Wilding (2)	(Germany) Friedrich Wilhelm Rahe	6-4, 2-,6 3–6, 6–4, 6–2
1912	(United Kingdom) Roy Allen	(United Kingdom) Mark Hick	6–2, 6–3, 6–2
1913	(United Kingdom) Roy Allen (2)	(United Kingdom) Arthur Wallis Myers	6–1, 6–2, 4–6, 6–4
1914	(United Kingdom) Gordon Lowe	(United States) Craig Biddle	6-4, 6-3
1915/1918	Not held (due to World War I)		
1924	(United Kingdom) George William Grounsell	(Italy) Pietro Malone	6–1, 6–2, 6–2
1927	(Denmark) Erik Worm	(India) Sri-Krishna Prasada	7–5, 6–3, 0–6, 7–5
1928	(Italy) Placido Gaslini	(Denmark) Erik Worm	6–2, 7–5, 2–6, 4–6, 7–5
1929	(United Kingdom) Pat Hughes	(United Kingdom) Eric Peters	6–2, 7–5, 3–6, 6–2
1930	(Denmark) Erik Worm (2)	(United Kingdom) Pat Hughes	3–6, 6–2, 6–4, 3–6, 6–3
1931	(France) Jean Lesueur	(France) Benny Berthet	8–6, 7–5, 1–6, 3–6, 6–2
1932	(Hungary) Béla von Kehrling	(Republic of Ireland) George Lyttleton Rogers	6–3, 6–3, 6–3
1933	(France) Jean Lesueur (2)	(Italy) Giovanni Palmieri	6–3, 6–4, 2–6, 6–1
1934	(France) Jean Lesueur (3)	(United States) Wilmer Hines	6–8, 6–3, 6–2, 6–3
1935	(Italy) Augusto Rado	(Czechoslovakia) Josef Caska	6–4, 4–6, 6–1, ret.
1936	(Italy) Giovanni Palmieri	(Italy) Augusto Rado	6–2, 6–3, 8–6
1937	(Czechoslovakia) Vojtěch Vodička	(Poland) Józef Hebda	6–2, 2–6, 6–3, 6–1
1939	(Socialist Federal Republic of Yugoslavia) Franjo Punčec	(Italy) Giorgio de Stefani	6–3, 6–3, 6–2
1940	(Germany) Gottfried von Cramm	(Italy) Francesco Romanoni	3–6, 3–6, 6–3, 7–5, 6–2
1941/1946	Not held (due to World War II)		
1947	(Hungary) József Asbóth	(Italy) Marcello del Bello	6–2, 6–4, 6–3
1948	(Spain) Pedro Masip	(France) Henri Cochet	6–1, 6–4, 9–7
1949	(Italy) Gianni Cucelli	(United States) Frank Parker	6–4, 3–6, 7–5, 7–5
1950	(Italy) Rolando Del Bello	(Sweden) Torsten Johansson	8–6, 6–2, 1–6, 7–5
1951	(United States) Dick Savitt	(United States) Budge Patty	6–4, 9–7, 4–6, 6–3
1952	(Egypt) Jaroslav Drobný	(Croatia) Milan Branović	6–3, 6–3, 6–2
1953	(Poland) Władysław Skonecki	(Italy) Gianni Cucelli	6–3, 6–1, 6–3
1954	(Italy) Fausto Gardini	(Argentina) Enrique Morea	6–1, 2–6, 6–3, 6–2
1955	(Egypt) Jaroslav Drobný (2)	(United States) Budge Patty	5–7, 6–2, 13–11, 6-2
1958	(Mexico) Mario Llamas	(Poland) Władysław Skonecki	6–4, 6–1, 1–6, 6–4
1960	(Italy) Nicola Pietrangeli	(Italy) Giuseppe Merlo	3–6, 6–2, 6–3, 6–4
1963	(Italy) Nicola Pietrangeli (2)	(Belgium) Jacques Brichant	6–2, 7–5, 7–5
1964	(Sweden) Jan-Erik Lundqvist	(Italy) Nicola Pietrangeli	11–9, 6–2, 6–4

=== Women's singles ===
(incomplete roll)

Year	Winner	Runner-up	Score
1908	(United Kingdom) Rosamund Salusbury	(United Kingdom) Evelyn Maude Froude Bellew	11-9, 6-1
1909	No women's event		
1910	(United Kingdom) Rosamund Salusbury(2)	(United Kingdom) Amy Ransome	6–3, 3–6, 6–4
1911	(United Kingdom) Rosamund Salusbury (3)	(United Kingdom) Miss Bridgewater	6-1, 6-0
1912	(United Kingdom) Jessie Tripp	(Germany) Mieken Rieck	6-1, 7-5
1913	(United Kingdom) Jessie Tripp (2)	(United States) Elizabeth Ryan	4–6, 6–4, 6–4
1914	(United Kingdom) Jessie Tripp (3)	(United Kingdom) Margaret Tripp	default
1915/1918	Not held (due to World War I)		
1924	(United States) Elizabeth Ryan	(United Kingdom) Phyllis Satterthwaite	6-3, 6-0
1926	(United Kingdom) Phyllis Satterthwaite	(Italy) Lucia Valerio	6–4, 4–6, 8–6
1927	(United Kingdom) Miss Hunt	?	?
1928	(United States) Elizabeth Ryan (2)	(Italy) Lucia Valerio	6-4, 6-4
1929	(Italy) Lucia Valerio	(United Kingdom) Phyllis Satterthwaite	0–6, 6–3, 6–3
1930	(United Kingdom) Phyllis Satterthwaite (2)	(Austria) Hilde Eisenmenger	6-0, 6-1
1931	(United Kingdom) Phyllis Satterthwaite (3)	(Italy) Lucia Valerio	5–7, 6–2, 6–2
1932	(Italy) Lucia Valerio (2)	(France) Ida Adamoff	6-3, 7-5
1933	(Germany) Cilly Aussem	(France) Simonne Mathieu	6-4, 6-0
1934	(Germany) Cilly Aussem (2)	(Italy) Lucia Valerio	6–4, 1–6, 6–1
1935	(Germany) Cilly Aussem (3)	(Italy) Lucia Valerio	8-6, 6-3
1936	(France) Ivana Orlandini	(France) Edith Belliard	6–1, 5–7, 7–5
1937	(Germany) Totta Zehden	(Poland) Jadwiga Jędrzejowska	4–6, 6–4, 6–3
1938	(Czechoslovakia) Minni Hein Müller	(Germany) Klara Hammer Beutter	6–2, 1–6, 11-9
1939	(France) Sylvia Jung Henrotin	(Germany) Rosl Kraus	6-4, 6-1
1940	(Socialist Federal Republic of Yugoslavia) Hella Kovac	(Germany) Anneliese Ullstein	4–6, 6–1, 6–1
1941/1946	Not held (due to World War II)		
1947	(United States) Pauline Betz	(Czechoslovakia) Helena Straubeova	6-2, 6-0
1948	(Italy) Annalisa Bossi	(Italy) Nicla Migliori	6-0, 6-3
1949	(Italy) Annalisa Bossi (2)	(Italy) Lucia Manfredi	6-2, 6-2
1950	(Italy) Annalisa Bossi (3)	(Italy) Nicla Migliori	2–6, 6–2, 6–1
1951	(United States) Doris Hart	(Italy) Annalisa Bellani	7-5, 6-1
1952	(United Kingdom) Joan Curry	(Italy) Annalisa Bellani	9-7, 6-3
1953	(Italy) Silvana Lazzarino	(United Kingdom) Joan Curry	6-3, 6-2
1954	(Italy) Silvana Lazzarino (2)	(West Germany) Totta Zehden	6–4, 6–1
1955	(United Kingdom) Shirley Bloomer	(United Kingdom) Elaine Watson	6-2, 6-0
1958	(Bermuda) Heather Brewer-Segal	(Mexico) Rosie Reyes	6-2, 6-4
1960	(Italy) Francesca Gordigiani	(Italy) Roberta Beltrame	6-1, 7-5
1963	(Italy) Silvana Lazzarino (3)	(West Germany) Almut Sturm	6-2, 6-1
1964	(West Germany) Almut Sturm	(Italy) Annalisa Bellani	4–6, 6–4, 6–4
