= Côte d'Azur Championships =

Côte d'Azur Championships Championnats de la Côte d'Azur

Defunct tennis tournament
- Tour: Mens Amateur Tour (1877–1912)
- Founded: 1910
- Abolished: 1939
- Location: Cannes, Provence-Alpes-Côte d'Azur, France
- Venue: Cannes Lawn tennis Club
- Surface: Clay (outdoor)

The Côte d'Azur Championships or Championnats de la Côte d'Azur also called the Championship of the Côte d'Azur was a men's and women's international clay court tennis tournament held at the Cannes Lawn Tennis Club, Cannes, Provence-Alpes-Côte d'Azur, France from 1910 through to 1939. It was one of the main tournaments on the French Riviera tennis circuit.

== History ==
Cannes Lawn Tennis Club, was formally established in 1907. In 1910 it began to host the Côte d'Azur Championships an international clay court tennis tournament that was staged until the start of World War II. It was one of the main tournaments that formed part of the French Riviera circuit.

== Finals ==
=== Men's Singles ===
| Year | Champions | Runners-up | Score |
|---|---|---|---|
| 1910 | (United States) Artimus Holmes | (United States) George Henry Nettleton | 4–6, 6–2, 7–5, 6–4 |
| 1911 | (Germany) Friedrich Wilhelm Rahe | (Australia) Rodney Heath | 6–4, 6–4, 7–9, 6–4 |
| 1912 | (Germany) Ferdinand Bölling | (United Kingdom) Arthur Wallis Myers | 4–6, 6–2, 7–5, 6–4 |
| 1913 | (Germany) Friedrich Wilhelm Rahe (2) | (Germany) Robert Kleinschroth | 6–3, 6–4, 6–2 |
| 1914 | (New Zealand) Anthony Wilding | (United Kingdom) Gordon Lowe | 6–3, 6–2, 6–4 |
| 1915/19 | Not held (due to World War One) | | |
| 1920 | (United Kingdom) Major Ritchie | (United Kingdom) Ambrose Dudley | 3–6, 6–0, 6–4, 5–7, 6–1 |
| 1921 | (Italy) Mino Balbi Di Robecco | (France) Félix Poulin | 6–2, 9–11, 6–3, 6–1 |
| 1922 | (France) Henri Cochet | (United Kingdom) D.L. Morgan | 8–6, 6–4, 6–2 |
| 1923 | (Canada) Henry Mayes | (United Kingdom) Alfred C. Hunter | 6–3, 6–2, 6–0 |
| 1924 | (Switzerland) Charles Aeschlimann | (United Kingdom) Brame Hillyard | 6–2, 6–1, 6–2 |
| 1925 | (France) René Lacoste | (United Kingdom) Gordon Lowe | 3–6, 6–0, 6–4, 5–7, 6–1 |
| 1926 | (France) Henri Cochet (2) | (Switzerland) Charles Aeschlimann | 6–4, 6–3, 6–0 |
| 1927 | (Canada) Henry Mayes (3) | (Germany) Otto Froitzheim | 1–6, 6–3, 2–6, 6–4, 2–0 ret. |
| 1928 | (France) Henri Cochet (4) | (Germany) Otto Froitzheim | w.o. |
| 1929 | (France) Emmanuelle du Plaix | (Germany) Fritz Kuhlmann Sr | 8–6, 6–2, 9–7 |
| 1930 | (United States) Bill Tilden | (Italy) Giorgio de Stefani | 6–4, 6–3, 6–4 |
| 1931 | (Republic of Ireland) George Lyttleton Rogers | (Switzerland) Charles Aeschlimann | 1-6, 6-2, 4-6, 6-1, 9-7 |
| 1932 | (Poland) Ignacy Tłoczyński | (Italy) Giorgio de Stefani | w.o. |
| 1933 | (Poland) Józef Hebda | (Poland) Ignacy Tłoczyński | 0–6, 6–4, 6–3, 6–3 |
| 1934 | (Italy) Giorgio de Stefani | (Austria) Franz Wilhelm Matejka | 6–1, 6–1, 5–7, 6–3 |
| 1935 | (France) Jacques Brugnon | (Italy) Giorgio de Stefani | 6–4, 6–3, 6–4 |
| 1936 | (Czechoslovakia) Josef Siba | (France) Christian Boussus | 6–3, 6–8, 6–2 |
| 1937 | (Poland) Kazimierz Tarlowski | (Sweden) Karl Schroder | 6–2, 3–6, 9–7, 6–4 |
| 1938 | (Austria) Adam Baworowski | (Sweden) Karl Schroder | 2–6, 6–3, 3–6, 6–1, 6–3 |
| 1939 | (France) Yvon Petra | (Poland) Adam Baworowski | 7–5, 7–5, 6–2 |

=== Women's Singles ===
| Year | Champions | Runners-up | Score |
|---|---|---|---|
| 1910 | (Germany) Clara von der Schulenburg | (United Kingdom) Eveline Maude Froude-Bellew | 6–4, 6–3 |
| 1911 | (Germany) Hedwig Neresheimer | (United Kingdom) Margaret Tripp | 6-0 6-2 |
| 1912 | (United Kingdom) Blanche Duddell Colston | (United Kingdom) Mrs Perrett | 6-2 6-4 |
| 1913 | (United States) Elizabeth Ryan | (Germany) Dagmar von Krohn | 4-6 6-2 6-0 |
| 1914 | (United States) Elizabeth Ryan (2) | (United Kingdom) M. Ward | 6-4 6-0 |
| 1915/19 | Not held (due to World War One) | | |
| 1920 | (United States) Elizabeth Ryan (3) | (United Kingdom) Geraldine Ramsey Beamish | 4–6, 6–2, 6–2 |
| 1921 | (United States) Elizabeth Ryan (4) | (United Kingdom) Phyllis Satterthwaite | 7–5, 6–2 |
| 1922 | (United States) Elizabeth Ryan (5) | (United Kingdom) Geraldine Ramsey Beamish | 6–4, 6–3 |
| 1923 | (United Kingdom) Phyllis Satterthwaite | (United Kingdom) Geraldine Ramsey Beamish | 8–6, 6–4 |
| 1924 | (United States) Elizabeth Ryan (6) | (Spain) Lili de Alvarez | 6–3, 6–3 |
| 1925 | (Spain) Lili de Alvarez | (United Kingdom) Cristobel Hardie | 6–0, 6–2 |
| 1926 | (United States) Helen Wills | (United Kingdom) Joan Ridley | default |
| 1927 | (Spain) Lili de Alvarez (2) | (Greece) Hélène Contostavlos | 6–3, 6–3 |
| 1928 | (Germany) Cilly Aussem | (United States) Elizabeth Barber Corbiere | 6–3, 6–0 |
| 1929 | (Spain) Lili de Alvarez (3) | (Germany) Paula von Reznicek | 6–4, 6–1 |
| 1930 | (Germany) Cilly Aussem (2) | (United Kingdom) Violet Owen | 6–0, 6–0 |
| 1931 | (United Kingdom) Phyllis Satterthwaite (2) | (Switzerland) Lolette Payot | 6–0, 6–0 |
| 1932 | (Poland) Jadwiga Jędrzejowska | (United Kingdom) Muriel Thomas | 6–3, 6–2 |
| 1933 | (Switzerland) Lolette Payot | (Nazi Germany) Grete Deutschova | 6–2, 6–3 |
| 1934 | (United Kingdom) Nancy Lyle | (France) Simonne Mathieu | 6–4, 6–4 |
| 1935 | (France) Simonne Mathieu | (United Kingdom) Kay Stammers | 6–1, 2–6, 6–0 |
| 1936 | (France) Simonne Mathieu (2) | (Poland) Jadwiga Jędrzejowska | 6–0, 5–7, 7–5 |
| 1937 | (Chile) Anita Lizana | (Poland) Jadwiga Jędrzejowska | 7–5, 5–7, 6–1 |
| 1938 | (Poland) Jadwiga Jędrzejowska (2) | (Luxembourg) Alice Weiwers | 6–2, 5–7, 6–4 |
| 1939 | (France) Simonne Mathieu (3) | (France) Simone Iribarne Lafargue | 8–6, 6–3 |

== Sources ==
- Albert Lejeune, ed. (March 31, 1930). "Tennis sur la Cote D'Azur" [Tennis at the Cote D'Azur]. Le Petit Niçois (in French). Nice, France.
- American Lawn Tennis. New York: American Lawn Tennis Publishing Company. 1939.
- Staff Writers. "1877 to 2012 Finals Results". Steve G Tennis. stevegtennis.com.
- Steinhart, J. (1925). Le Voyageur en France. Paris: French Government Tourist Office.
- TenX Tennis Directory. North Sydney, NSW, Australia: Tenx Pro.
