= Erik Worm =

Danish tennis player

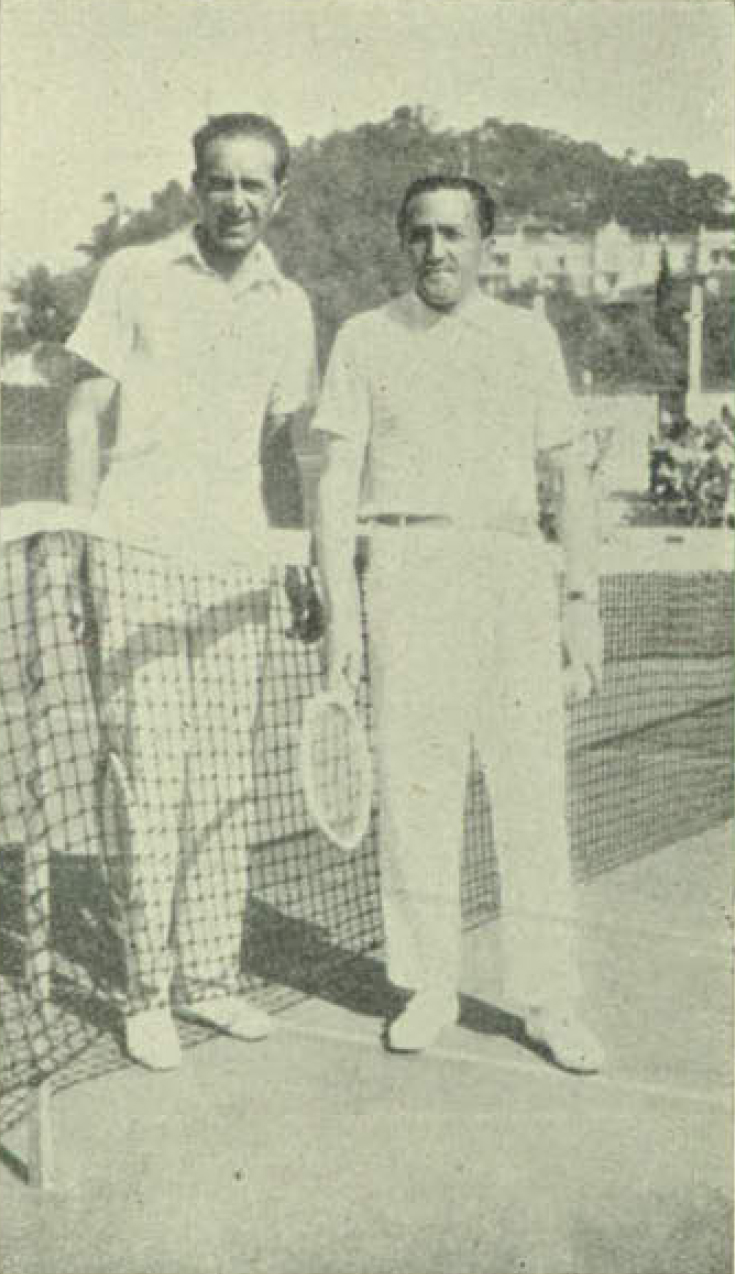
- from left:Erik Worm and Béla von Kehrling in Sanremo in 1929
- Full name: Erik Jean-Louis Worm
- Country (sports): Denmark
- Born: 26 April 1900 Copenhagen, Denmark
- Died: 17 October 1962 (aged 62) New York City, United States
- Plays: Right-handed (one-handed backhand)

Grand Slam singles results
- French Open: 1R (1926)

Other tournaments
- WHCC: 3R (1923)

Team competitions
- Davis Cup: SF^{Eu} (1924, 1931)

Erik Jean-Louis Worm (26 April 1900 – 17 October 1962) or simply Louis^{[a]} was a Danish tennis player. He was a three-time Danish national singles and mixed doubles champion (1922, 1923, 1924) and a two times doubles champion (1922, 1925) Apart from being a Danish champion he was the Austrian champion as well. In club level competitions he represented the Boldklubben af 1893. Worm was a runner-up for the Monte-Carlo Championships (now known as the Monte-Carlo Masters) in both singles and doubles.

== Early life ==
Erik Worm was born on April 26, 1900, in Copenhagen to Wilhelm Worm.

== Tennis career ==
1920-1930

Worm entered the last edition of the World Hard Court Championships in 1923 and advanced in the third round losing to count Manuel de Gomar. Between 1922 and 1925 he held the Danish Championships on numerous occasions collecting 8 titles altogether. In 1926 in his first oversees final in the Buffalo tennis and squash club invitational tournament he partnered with two-time singles champion Manuel Alonso for the doubles event, eventually falling to the home favorites Arnald Jones and George Lott. In February 1927 he reached the finals of the New Courts of Cannes mixed contest with Elizabeth Ryan. Next week at the Gallia L.T.C. of Cannes tournament came short in both doubles championship matches; in mixed with Ryan to Henri Cochet and Eileen Bennett and the men's with René Gallèpe to Cochet-Charles Aeschlimann. In June at the inaugural of the newly built Margaret Island courts of Budapest the Hungary Davis Cup team hosted an international meeting with Denmark with the latter team victorious. The score was 3–2, Worm beat Imre Takáts in four sets. In March 1928 at the Menton Cup he paired with Phyllis Satterthwaite and marched to the semifinal match against Cochet-Bennett with the latter team advancing to the final round. He took revenge on Cochet and his partner Salm in the doubles final where he and Kehrling won in straights The two of them went to the final of the singles where the Hungarian doubles partner beat him in a fierce fight.

In April 1928 he found success in several tournaments throughout Europe, the Beausite mixed trophy with Ryan from Cochet and Satterthwaite (Worm also was a contender for the men's doubles), the Beaulieu tournament against George Lyttleton-Rogers and the Pforzheim mixed doubles event in July again alongside Ryan. Next year he defended his Menton doubles title with Kehrling against the Italian duo of Giorgio de Stefani and Alberto del Bono. Although the defending champions split for the mixed and faced each other at the final with Kehrling making a good decision by choosing Cilly Aussem, while Worm and Satterthwaite finished second. In the April edition of the Monte-Carlo tournament Worm clinched the title by beating Junior Monaco champ Wilbur Coen. In mixed O'Connell and Elizabeth Ryan overcame Worm and Satterthwaite. In May George Lyttleton-Rogers had a clean victory over Worm in the singles last four of the L.T.C. Beaulieu tournament. He was more successful in the doubles where he and Jack Hillyard became the Riviera champions after eliminating the Austrian Davis-Cup partners Hermann Artens and Ludwig Salm-Hoogstraeten. And in the follow-up mixed rematch of O'Connell-Ryan and Worm-Satterthwaite the Danish-Briton team equalized the tally. O'Connell and Worm met again in the mixed final of the Montreux tournament at Switzerland, where they played with Muriel Thomas and the returning Cilly Aussem respectively, but the latter team hadn't found his form yet. Then he toured the Weimar Republic and brought home several titles including the ones from Wiesbaden in doubles with Hector Fisher (also a singles runner-up versus Fisher), the Berlin Blau—Weiss doubles with Fisher (also a singles runner-up versus Franz-Wilhelm Matejka).

1930

In January 1930 at the Monte Carlo Country Club Bill Tilden and Charles Kingsley started off the season with the Monegasque doubles title victory over Worm and Brame Hillyard. The same month at the New Courts of Cannes Worm and George Lyttleton-Rogers lost to Tilden and Kingsley again. The next week at Gallia L.T.C. Worm and Joan Ridley had a shot at the mixed title but were stopped again by Tilden and Aussem. Then in February at the Carlton L.T.C. of Cannes doubles contest Paul Barrelet de Ricou and Worm met and lost to the two members of the Four Musketeers Jacques Brugnon and Henri Cochet. In the quarterfinals of the mixed draw in an encounter between Satterthwaite-Worm and Aussem-Tilden, chair umpire A. Wallis Myers became so upset of Tilden's attitude towards him after he overruled a service that he left the court. Official organizers' efforts to find another umpire remained unsuccessful as the match continued without chair or line umpire. In the end Tilden's team won the match in three sets. In March in their second Menton title defense attempt Kehrling and Worm lost in the semis to Tamio Abe and Aeschlimann when the title-holders were already serving for the match. Hughes and Ryan prevented Worm and Satterthwaite in the mixed to claim their first Menton crown. In Beaulieu Worm and his recurring mixed partner Satterthwaite was unable to defend their title and ceded it to Pat Hughes and Violet Owen. In the South of France Championships the doubles were decided between Irishman Rogers and Worm and their opponents Tilden-Coen with the American visitors leaving with the title. In June he found a good partner in Tilden and became German Champions after winning the doubles at the Pfings-Turnier of the Rot-Weiss Club in Berlin.

Later years

Worm began the year 1931 with forming a new doubles team with Charles Aeschlimann with whom they were victors at the L.T.C. de Juan-les-Pins and Beausite L.T.C. Cannes. They met at the singles finals of the former championships where the Swiss champion defeated Worm in straights. Then Worm toured Switzerland, in Geneve singles final he was beaten by Antoine Gentien while in the Lucerne doubles final he and Georges Glasser were beaten by John Olliff and Jean Lesueur and last in the Basel international tournament he clinched the mixed title and almost attached the singles to it but lost to Hector Fisher. In June in Germany he was a two-times runner-up in mixed and men's doubles in Bad Neuenahr and a mixed runner-up in Wiesbaden. In the Monaco tournament Beaumont Trophy Worm and Hillyard were forfeited the game to Kehrling and Artens.

In the very first tournament of the year 1932 at the Beaulieu doubles title match George Lyttleton-Rogers and Vladimir Landau was triumphant after a five set meeting with Aeschlimann and Worm. In March at the Menton mixed doubles finals Worm and Satterthwaite failed for the fourth time and succumbed to the French couple of André Martin-Legeay and Simonne Mathieu .

== Personal life ==
In January 1923 Worm secretly married socialite Alice Macy Beers in New York City daughter of William Hanford Beers. The couple lived in Denmark between 1917 and 1924. Later they moved to the United States and until his death in 1962 he lived in New York City.

== Notes ==
- ^{a} Worm usually used the alias "Louis" when registering for tournaments.
