= Le Touquet International Championship =

Le Touquet International Championship Championnat International du Touquet

Defunct tennis tournament
- Tour: ILTF Circuit
- Founded: 1903; 123 years ago
- Abolished: 1983; 43 years ago
- Location: Le Touquet, France
- Venue: Le Touquet Tennis Club
- Surface: Clay

The Le Touquet International Championship or Championnat International du Touquet was a men's and women's clay court tennis founded in 1903. The tournament was played at the Le Touquet Tennis Club, Le Touquet, France. Also known as the Le Touquet Spa Championship it was usually held at the beginning of September and was played annually until 1983 when it was discontinued

== History ==
Le Touquet Tennis Club was founded in 1903 but did not have a premenant home until 1904 when the club was officially inaugurated by Baron Pierre de Coubertin. The Le Touquet International Championship was first played on 14 September 1903 and ended on 20 September 1903.

The first winner of the men's singles title was England's George Greville. The first winner of the women's singles was England's Edith Austin Greville. In 1913, Suzanne Lenglen, then aged 13, won the international tournament in Le Touquet, then did it again in 1920 when she was world champion. In 1936 the championship switched dates till July or sometimes in August. The final winner of the men's title was Peru's Pablo Arraya in 1983. The women's singles event ended in 1970 that was won by Australia's Lesley Hunt.

== Other tournaments ==
The club organised a series of other preceding tournaments to this event known as the Le Touquet July Tournament or Tournoi de juillet du Touquet and Le Touquet International Challenge Cup or Tournoi d'août du Touquet, and the Le Touquet Spa Second Meeting or Tournoi du Touquet (Deuxième rencontre) that followed immediately after this championship in mid to late September. In 1935 the club also staged the first Le Touquet Pro Tournament that ended in 1937. After the Second World War, in 1958, a second professional tennis tournament the Le Touquet Pro was held.
