= Bordighera Championship =

Defunct tennis tournament
- Founded: 1913
- Abolished: 1952
- Location: Bordighera, Liguria, Italy
- Venue: Bordighera LTC
- Surface: Clay

The Bordighera Championship was a combined clay court tennis tournament held at the Bordighera Lawn Tennis Club(f.1878), Bordighera, Liguria, Italy from 1913 to 1952.

== History ==
The Bordighera Lawn Tennis Club was formally established in 1878 with the help of the Bishop of London John Jackson who chaired a committee of British expatriates, who were resident in Bordighera at that time to provide funds for the construction of the tennis behind the English Church. (this was the first tennis club in Italy). In 1913 the Bordighera Championship was established.

In 1939 at the outset of World War II, the British community living in Bordighera left, and international players abandoned the tournament. Following the war the tournament continued as a local event for Italian players, and the championship was last staged in 1952, the men's singles was won by Orlando Sirola.

Notable winners of this tournament in the men's singles included Anthony Wilding (1914), Jack Hillyard (1922–1924), Erik Worm (1927–1928), Giorgio de Stefani (1928), George Lyttleton Rogers (1931), Giovanni Palmieri (1932, 1934, 1936–1937), Jean Le Sueur (1935, 1938) and Henner Henkel (1939).

Former notable winners of women's singles title included Phyllis Carr Satterthwaite (1922–1923, 1926, 1929), Elizabeth Ryan (1927–1928), Dorothy Holman (1925), Joan Ridley (1928–30), Ilse Friedleben (1931) and Simonne Mathieu (1935) and Gracyn Wheeler Kelleher (1939).

== Sources ==
- Bordighera Lawn Tennis Club 1878 - BLTC1878 - Il Tennis piu' antico d'Italia". www.tennisbordighera.it. Bordighera Lawn Tennis Club.
- Le Figaro Newspaper. (20 March 1931). Paris, France.
- Nieuwland, Alex. "Tournament – Bordighera". www.tennisarchives.com. Netherlands: Tennis Archives.
- The Badminton Magazine of Sports & Pastimes. London: Longmans, Green and Company. 1913.
- Whitehouse, Rosie (2013). Bradt Liguria. Chalfont Saint Peter, United Kingdom: Bradt Travel Guides. ISBN 978-1-84162-473-0.
