= Beaulieu Championships =

Beaulieu Championships Championnats de Beaulieu

Defunct tennis tournament
- Tour: French Riviera Circuit
- Founded: 1913; 113 years ago
- Abolished: 1975; 51 years ago
- Location: Beaulieu-sur-Mer, France
- Venue: Beaulieu Tennis Club
- Surface: Clay

The Beaulieu Championships or Championnats de Beaulieu and also known as the Championships of Beaulieu or the Beaulieu International Championships or the Bristol Tournament was a men's and women's clay court tennis founded in 1913. The tournament was played at the Beaulieu Tennis Club, Beaulieu-sur-Mer, France. It was usually held at the beginning of September and was played annually until 1983 when it was discontinued

== History ==
In 1899 the Hotel Bristol at Beaulieu-sur-Mer, France was opened by Sir John Blundell Maple, 1st Baronet an English business magnate. He established the Beaulieu Tennis Club that year on land he owned next to the hotel. The first Championships of Beaulieu were played on 3 February 1913 and ended on 9 February 1913 and were part of the French Riviera Tennis Circuit.

The first winner of the men's singles title was Germany's Friedrich Wilhelm Rahe. The first winner of the women's singles was America's Elizabeth Ryan. In 1920, Suzanne Lenglen played the international tournament. Between 1928 and 1931 two editions of the women's championship were staged. The championships were held annually until 1975, however the event was abandoned due to severe rain and the finalists of the men's Hungary's Géza Varga and France's Patrice Beust, and finalist of the women's singles Italy's Antonella Rosa and Hungary's Beatrix Klein divided the title between themselves.
