= Henry Mayes =

British-Canadian tennis player

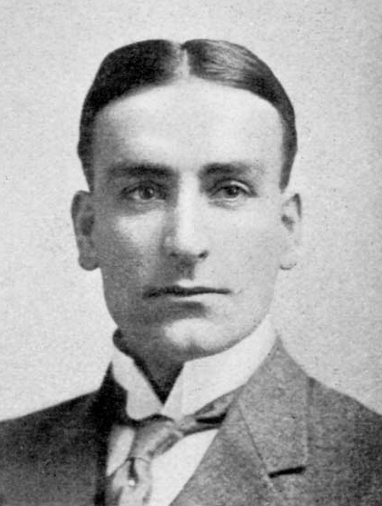
- Full name: Henry George Mayes
- Country (sports): Canada
- Born: 14 February 1880 Northampton, England
- Died: 1928 (aged 47–48)
- Turned pro: 1906 (amateur)
- Retired: 1928

Singles
- Career record: 253–58, (81.35%)
- Career titles: 51

Grand Slam singles results
- Wimbledon: QF (1921)

Other tournaments
- WCCC: QF (1920)

Grand Slam doubles results
- Wimbledon: 3R (1913, 1927)

Grand Slam mixed doubles results
- Wimbledon: 2R (1926)

Team competitions
- Davis Cup: F (1913)

Henry George Mayes, MBE (14 February 1880 – 1928) was a British-Canadian tennis player, military figure and businessman. He was a quarter finalist at the 1920 World Covered Court Championships, and the 1921 Wimbledon Championships. He was active from 1906 to 1928 and won 51 career singles titles.

== Biography ==
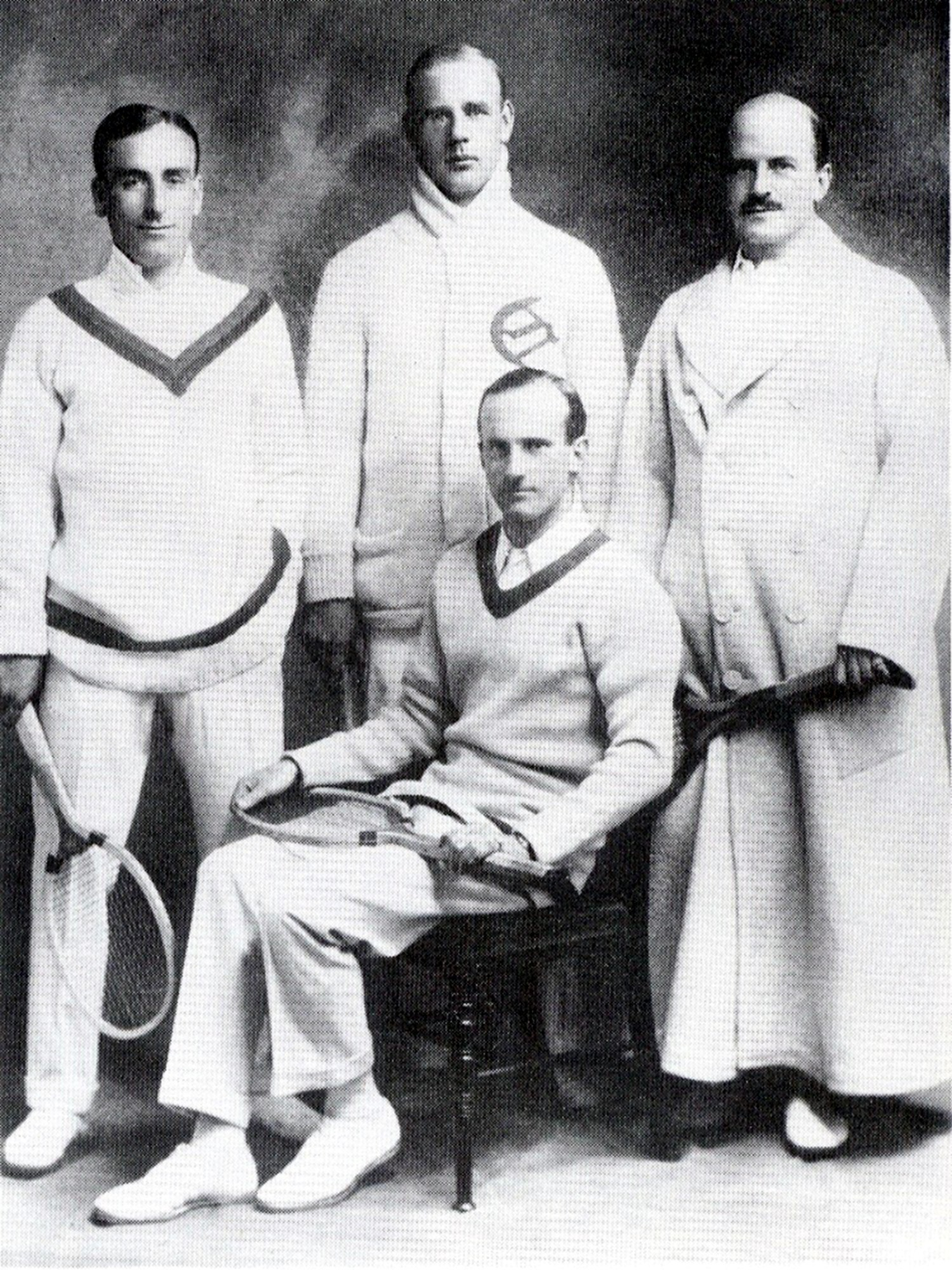
Mayes (standing left) with other players of the 1913 Canadian Davis Cup Team

Born in Northampton, Mayes was educated at Northampton Grammar School. He served in the Boer War in 1898, joining the Natal Horse as a trooper. He was promoted to a captain and was awarded the King's and Queen's medals. In 1908, he resigned his commission after marrying Frances Hazard of Long Island, and moved to Winnipeg, Manitoba, Canada in 1909. There he founded a tanning company with business associates. However, he was called to military duty against with the outbreak of World War I and was a founding member of The Fort Garry Horse, serving under the Canadian forces on the Western Front from 1914 to 1916 in France, during which he was promoted from captain to major. After the war he was again promoted to lieutenant-colonel and was the head of Bayonet Fighting. His sporting expertise saw him appointed head of physical training with the Canadian Air Force and in the same position in the UK for the RAF, which saw him awarded an MBE in January 1918. He later became based in Victoria, British Columbia and London. Mayes was a good all-round sportsman, participating in polo, tennis, and shooting on an international level. He excelled at tennis, and his hard-court play was reported to be his strongest surface and he enjoyed much popularity as a tennis player.

Mayes was on the 1913 Canadian Davis Cup team along with J. F. Foulkes, Robert Powell and Bernie Schwengers. It was Canada's first entry into the Davis Cup and they reached the final of the Cup only to be defeated by the United States in the summer of 1913 at Wimbledon where the Cup was being held.

His career singles highlights include winning the Manitoba Championships in 1910 and again in 1912. In 1926 he won the North London Championships at the Gipsy Lawn Tennis Club, Stamford Hill, London, England against Gordon Lowe. He won the London Championships in 1922, 1926 and 1927, defeating Donald Greig in four sets, Arthur Lowe in straight sets and D.M. Evans in straight sets respectively. He was also a competitor at the Wimbledon Championships. Mayes also won the Côte d'Azur Championships at Cannes, France two times (1923. 1927), and the Monaco Championships (1927). Winning his last championship at the age of 47, when most modern players have long since been retired, he died just a year after his last win in London in 1928 of blood poisoning, aged 48. According to the United States Lawn Tennis Association, Mayes was reported to have still been in peak physical shape before his death, "approaching a half century".
