= Rothmans Grass Court Invitation Roehampton =

Defunct tennis tournament
- Founded: 1919; 107 years ago
- Abolished: 1967; 59 years ago
- Location: Roehampton, London, England
- Venue: Roehampton Club
- Surface: Grass

The Rothmans Grass Court Invitation Roehampton originally called the Roehampton Grass Courts was a tennis tournament established in 1919. It was staged at the Roehampton Club, Roehampton, London, England and ran through until 1967 when it was abolished.

== History ==
The first edition of this tournament was held in July 1919 with the final edition taking place in May 1967. Former winners of the men's singles included Frank Fisher, Gordon Lowe, Francis Hunter, Brian Norton, Athar-Ali Fyzee, Tony Mottram, John Barrett, Tony Roche. The women's singles title had been won by Elizabeth Ryan, Molla Bjurstedt Mallory, Geraldine Beamish, Marion Zinderstein and Esna Boyd

== Sponsorship ==
In 1967 the tobacco company Rothmans International took over sponsorship of the event for one year only.
