= French Riviera tennis circuit =

French Riviera Circuit

Defunct tennis tournament
- Tour: French Riviera Circuit
- Location: Beaulieu-sur-Mer; Cannes; Hyères; Menton; Nice; Monte Carlo
- Surface: Clay (outdoor)

The French Riviera Circuit also called the French Riviera Winter Circuit was a series of international amateur tennis tournaments held on the French Riviera usually beginning at the end of the preceding year around late December through the end of April the following year.

== History ==
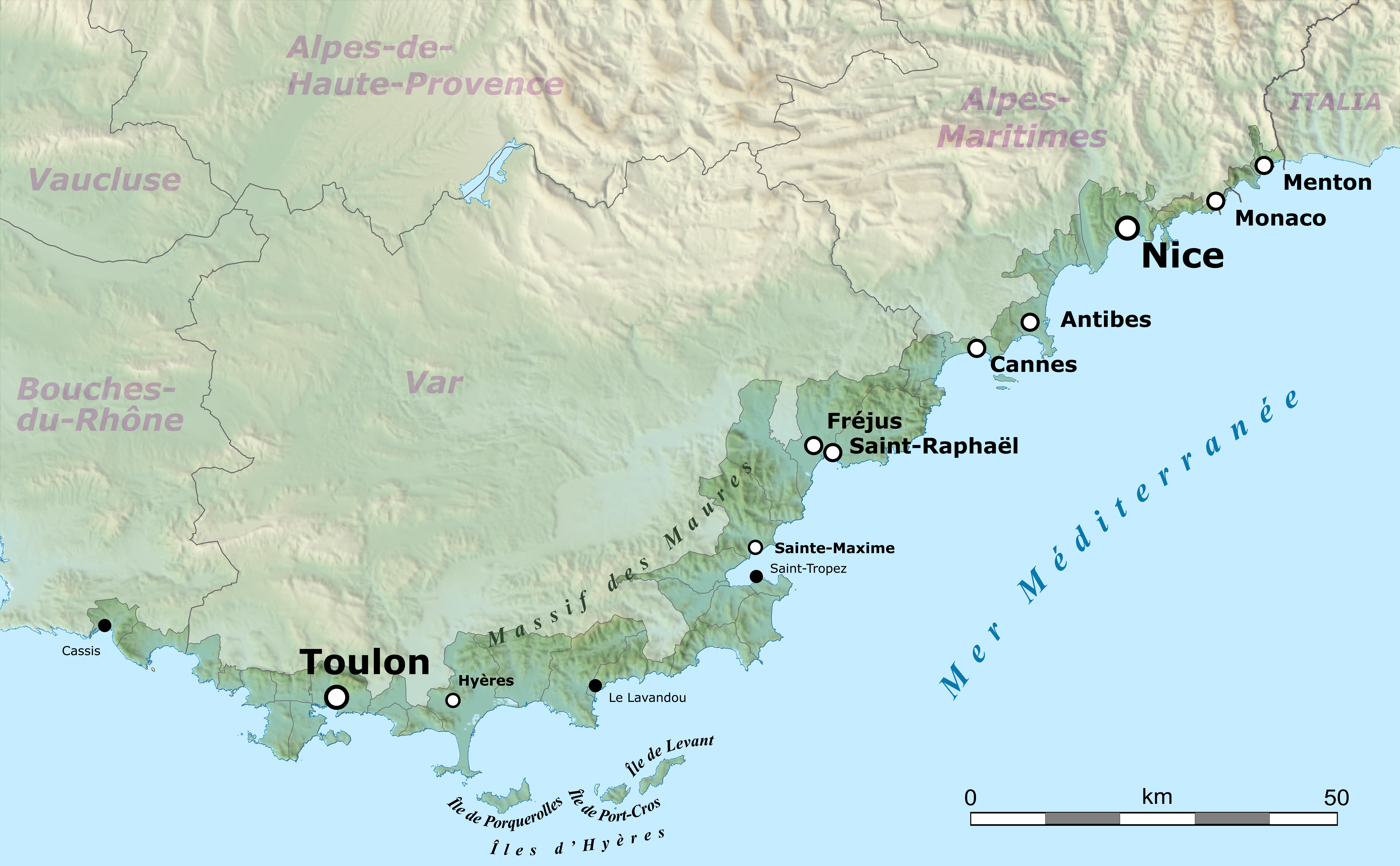
Map of the French Riviera

These tournaments began with the Beau Site tournament in Cannes in 1890 and were continued by the South of France Championships in Nice from 1895, the Monte Carlo Championships tournament from 1897, the Riviera Championships held at Menton from 1902, the Côte d'Azur Championships held at Cannes LTC, Cannes (f. 1910–1928), and many others. They arose from leading British tennis players Ernest and William Renshaw regularly travelling to the Riviera beginning in 1880 to have the opportunity to play tennis in the winter at a time of year when it was too cold to play outdoors in Britain. Many other British players followed suit, including Reginald and Laurence Doherty. In time, international tournaments began to be held weekly on the Riviera. Although they were held in France, the bulk of the players participating were British and the language of these tournaments was English.

== Sources ==
- Engelmann, Larry (1988). The Goddess and the American Girl: The Story of Suzanne Lenglen and Helen Wills. New York: Oxford University Press. ISBN 978-0195043631.
- Little, Alan (2007). Suzanne Lenglen: Tennis Idol of the Twenties. The Wimbledon Lawn Tennis Museum. ISBN 978-0906741436.
- Little, Alan (2014). The Golden Days of Tennis on the French Riviera, 1874-1939. London: The Wimbledon Lawn Tennis Museum. ISBN 978-0906741542.
