= Phyllis Satterthwaite =

British tennis player (1886–1962)

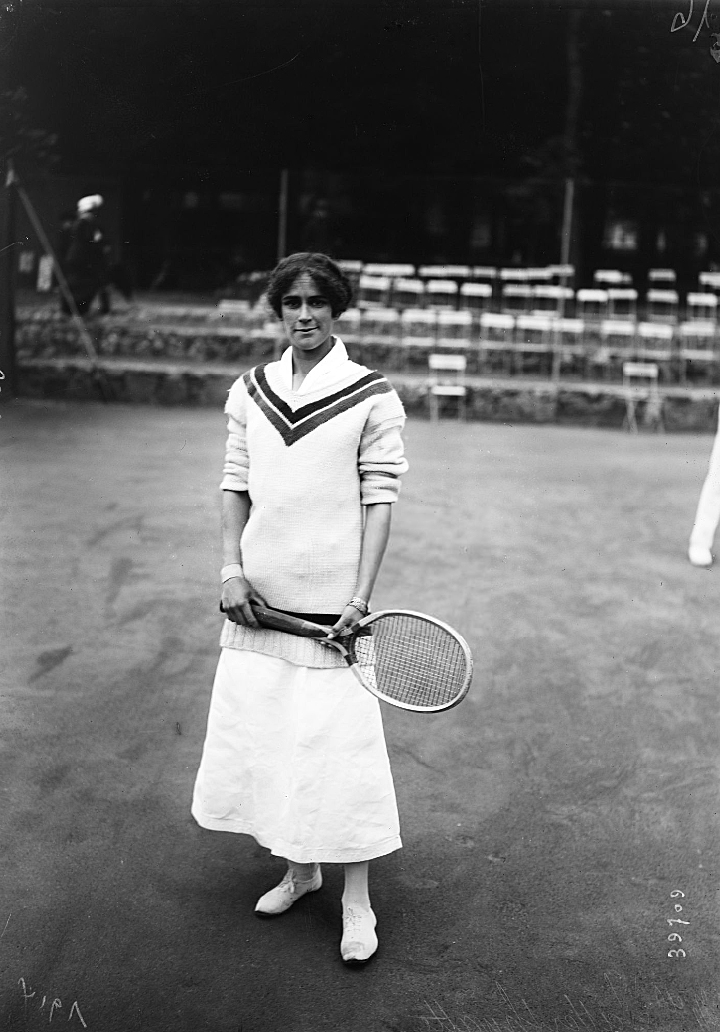
- Phyllis Satterthwaite in 1914
- Full name: Phyllis Helen Carr Satterthwaite
- Country (sports): Great Britain
- Born: 26 January 1886 London, England
- Died: 20 January 1962 (aged 75) London, England
- Turned pro: 1919 (amateur)
- Retired: 1937

Singles
- Career record: 537-182 (74.7%)
- Career titles: 77
- Highest ranking: 8 (1924)

Grand Slam singles results
- French Open: 2R (1930, 1933)
- Wimbledon: F (1919, 1921) (All Comers')

Doubles

Grand Slam doubles results
- Wimbledon: QF (1913, 1914, 1919, 1920)
- WHCC: W (1920)

Grand Slam mixed doubles results
- Wimbledon: QF (1921, 1923, 1925)

Phyllis Helen Satterthwaite (née Carr; 26 January 1886 – 20 January 1962) was a female tennis player from Great Britain who was active from the early 1910s until the late 1930s.

== Tennis career ==
In 1911, she participated for the first time in the Wimbledon Championships. In 1919, she reached the final of the All-Comers competition in which she was defeated by eventual champion Suzanne Lenglen in two sets. Two years later, in 1921, she again made it to the final of the All-Comers competition, but this time lost to American Elizabeth Ryan in two straight sets. In total she competed in 20 Wimbledon Championships between 1911 and 1935.

In 1920, she won the women's doubles title at the World Hard Court Championships in Paris. Playing alongside her compatriot Dorothy Holman they defeated the French team Germaine Golding and Jeanne Vaussard. She was selected to play in the 1923 Wightman Cup but was unable to participate. In 1924, she participated in the Olympic Games in Paris. Via a bye in the first round and a walkover in the second she reached the third round in the singles competition which she lost in straight sets to Helen Wills who would go on to win the gold medal.

In 1919, 1920, and 1921, she won three consecutive singles titles at the Welsh Covered Court Championships.

Satterthwaite was a baseline player with a game based on safety and keeping the ball in play. In 1930, she played against Lucia Valerio in the final of the Bordighera Championship tournament on the Italian Riviera. At match point her determination not to make an error resulted in a rally which lasted 450 strokes. (Note: In Ayres' Lawn Tennis Almanack 1930 editor A. Wallis Myers mentions "the ball travelling over the net more than 200 times".) Satterthwaite won the point and the match.

In 1931, she competed in several Riviera open championships, reaching the final on 13 occasions and winning eight titles, defeating among others Cilly Aussem and Betty Nuthall. including the South of France Championships.

== World Championships finals ==
=== Doubles (1 title) ===
Result	Year	Championship	Surface	Partner	Opponents	Score
Win	1920	World Hard Court Championships	Clay	(United Kingdom) Dorothy Holman	(France) Germaine Golding (France) Jeanne Vaussard	6–3, 6–1

== Personal life ==
She married Clement Richard Satterthwaite on 13 April 1912. Satterthwaite lived in London with her husband until April 1923 when she divorced and moved to Cannes and resided on the French Riviera. She wrote tennis reports to magazines for a living. In 1928, she visited England where he was charged by the King's Bench for tax evasion.

In 1924, she published a book titled Lawn Tennis for Women. The following year she published Tips for Tennis Players.

== Death and legacy ==
Satterthwaite died on 20 January 1962, aged 75, in the London borough of Westminster. Upon her death, her estate was valued at £50,000 net . She had instructed the executor of her estate to make her will on the basis that she “hated all human beings and would leave her money to animals”, and told him to write a list of animal charities selected from the phone book, between whom her estate should be divided. This led to litigation (which concluded in the Court of Appeal), because one of the named beneficiaries, the London Animal Hospital, was not a charity. Competing claims to a share of the estate by a private individual who operated a business under that name, and by Blue Cross (which had operated a hospital known informally as the London Animals Hospital) failed, and Lords Justice Harman and Russell ordered that a scheme cy-pres be set up. (Lord Justice Diplock’s concurring judgment read in its entirety: “With that humility which is becoming in a common law lawyer when confronted with such an arcane branch of the Chancery law, I agree with the judgments which have been delivered”.)

== Bibliography ==
- Lawn Tennis for Women Renwick of Otley, London 1924.
- Tips for Tennis Players 1925.
