= 1931 men's and women's ILTF tennis circuit =

1930 men's and women's ILTF tennis circuit
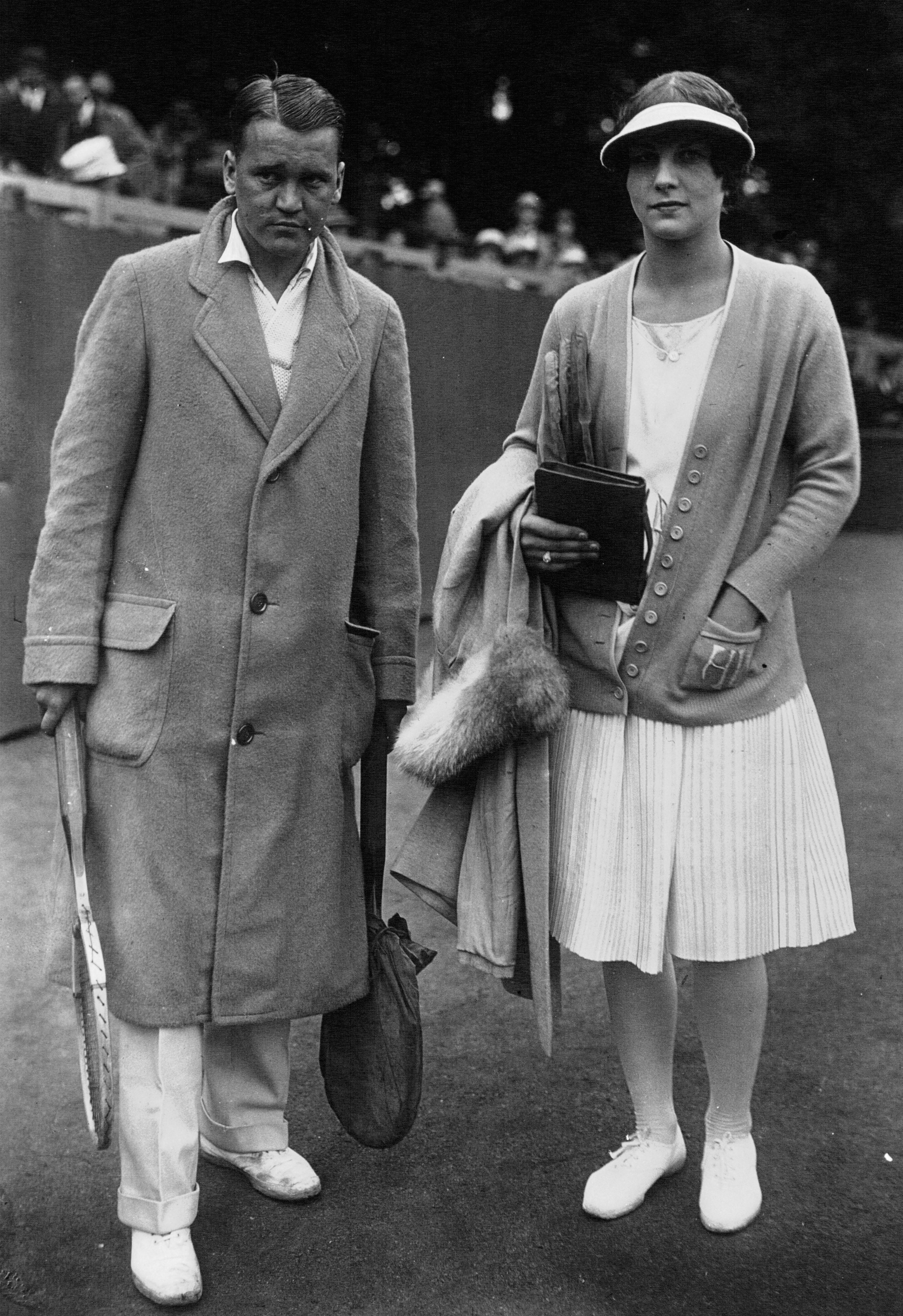
- Vincent Richards, the defending 1930 Pro World Champion after having defeated Karel Koželuh for the title, and Helen Wills, the top ranked amateur female player of 1931

Details
- Duration: December 24, 1930 – December 18, 1931
- Tournaments: 160
- Categories: Grand Slam (4); Pro Majors (3); National championships (20); International championships (135); Team events (20); Pro Tour (10)

Achievements (singles)
- Most titles: (United States) Ellsworth Vines (10) (Weimar Republic) Cilly Aussem (9)
- Most finals: (Republic of Ireland) George Lyttleton-Rogers (14) (Weimar Republic) Cilly Aussem (11)

The year 1931 in tennis was a complex mixture of mainly amateur tournaments composed of international, invitational, national, exhibition, team (city leagues, country leagues, international knock-out tournaments) events and joined by an up-and-coming Pro Tour both on competitive and exhibitional levels.

At the end of the pro season the champion title was awarded. Bill Tilden held the title at the end of the year. He also ran his own pro organization called the Tilden Tennis Tours and toured the world with a series of pro exhibition-like matches. The European professionals of Germany, France, Britain, Austria, the Netherlands and Switzerland founded the International Federation of Professionists and Professionals headed by Roman Najuch to represent their interest against the International Lawn Tennis Federation (ILTF). There were a few occasional professionals against amateur challenges as well held in team competition format. The amateur events were almost all co-educated thus the majority included a mixed title contest. Irishman George Lyttleton-Rogers dominated the European scene winning eight singles titles, all of which were confined to French and Italian championships. Ellsworth Vines was the dominant male player on the North American tour. The women's most successful players were Miss Elizabeth Ryan in North America and Cilly Aussem in Europe and in South America. Australian tennis life was figureheaded by Jack Crawford.

The most prestigious team cups were the Wightman Cup for ladies and the Davis Cup (called the International Lawn Tennis Challenge) for men. The 1931 Wightman Cup was its 9th edition and was organized by the United States Tennis Association between the teams of Great Britain and the United States. The 1931 International Lawn Tennis Challenge was its 26th edition and was organized by the ILTF. The Americas Zone was split into the North/Central American Zone and the South American Zone. The winner of each sub-zone would play to determine who moved to the Inter-Zonal round. 22 teams entered the Europe Zone, while 7 participated in the Americas Zone. The United States defeated Argentina in the American Zone, but would then lose to Great Britain in the Inter-Zonal play-off. France defeated Great Britain in the Challenge Round, giving France their fifth straight title. The final was played at Stade Roland Garros in Paris, France, on 24–26 July.

== Legend ==
Pro Majors
National championships
International championships
Team events
Pro tour

Key

- Q = Qualifier
- WC = Wild card
- LL = Lucky loser
- Alt = Alternate
- ITF = ITF entry
- PR = Protected ranking
- SR = Special ranking
- SE = Special exempt
- JE = Junior exempt
- JR = Junior Accelerator Programme entrant
- CO = College Accelerator Programme entrant
- NG = Next Gen Accelerator Program entrant
- w/o = Walkover
- r = Retired
- d = Defaulted

This list includes men and women international tournaments (where at least several different nations were represented), main (annual) national championships, professional tour events and the Davis Cup

== Pre-tournament season ==
- Italy beat Monaco and the team of São Paulo in international team challenges four to one in both matches.
- In the Paris – Stockholm club competition, the French troupe led by Jacques Brugnon and Christian Boussus beat the Swedish squadron four to one.
- The Czechoslovak professionals headed by Karel Koželuh and Pavel Macenauer toured South Africa where they scored two draws against the home team twice in Durban and Port Elizabeth.
- Vincent Richards retired and dropped his World Pro title as of the start of the year to handle his business affairs, although he came back to playing during the season.
- Emmett Paré turned professional and later joined the Tilden Tennis Tours.

== January ==
- Bill Tilden turned professional as of this season after violating the amateur rules by signing a three-picture contract with Metro Goldwyn Mayer and thus was expelled from the ILTF.
- Frank Hunter turned professional in mid-January.
- Harry Hopman wins all three titles at the Sydney Metropolitan Championship.
- The simultaneous use of two racquets by one player was officially banned as of this season.
- Jean Schopfer, the second ever champion of the French Championships, died.
- In the Berlin – Paris city club competition on 10 and 11 January, the French team led by Borotra, Boussous and Brugnon beat the German team led by Von Cramm, Kleinschroth and Prenn by eleven to two.
- A British team led by Bunny Austin and John Olliff toured British India.

Week	Event	Men		Women		Mixed	
Week	Event	Champions	Runner-up	Champions	Runner-up	Champions	Runner-up
22–28 Dec	L.T.C. Juan-les-Pins Championship; Juan-les-Pins, France	(Switzerland) Charles Aeschlimann; 6–4, 6–2, 6–1	(Denmark) Erik Worm	(United Kingdom) Muriel Thomas; 6–2, 6–1	(United States) Elizabeth Ryan	(Switzerland) Aeschlimann (United Kingdom) Thomas; 6–0, 6–2	(United States) Hunter (United States) Ryan
24 Dec-1 Jan	New Zealand Lawn Tennis Championships; Christchurch, New Zealand	(New Zealand) Alan Stedman; 7–5, 6–1, 6–3	(New Zealand) H.A. Barnett	(New Zealand) May Dykes; 6–1, 9–7	(New Zealand) Marjorie Macfarlane		
24 Dec-1 Jan	New Zealand Lawn Tennis Championships; Christchurch, New Zealand	(New Zealand) Charles Angas; Ivan Seay; 6–3, 6–3, 6–3	France / France	(New Zealand) Melody; May Myers; N/A	N/A	(New Zealand) Ivan Seay; May Andrew; 7–5, 3–6, 7–5	Thomson / Wilson
29 Dec – 4 Jan	Beausite – L. T. C. de Cannes Championship; Cannes, France	(Republic of Ireland) George Lyttleton-Rogers; 8–6, 6–1, 3–6, 7–5	(Switzerland) Charles Aeschlimann	(United States) Elizabeth Ryan; 4–6, 8–6, 6–1	(United Kingdom) Phyllis Satterthwaite		
29 Dec – 4 Jan	Beausite – L. T. C. de Cannes Championship; Cannes, France	(Switzerland) Aeschlimann (Denmark) Erik Worm; 6–3, 9–7, 6–2	(Republic of Ireland) Rogers (United Kingdom) Hillyard	(United Kingdom) Thomas; Taunay; 8–10, 6–2, 6–2	(United Kingdom) Satterthwaite (United States) Ryan	(Switzerland) Aeschlimann (United Kingdom) Thomas; 4–6, 6–3, 6–3	(Republic of Ireland) Rogers (United States) Ryan
5–11 Jan	Métropole Club de Cannes Beausite; Cannes, France	(Republic of Ireland) George Lyttleton-Rogers; 8–10, 7–5, 4–6, 6–4, 6–2	(France) Paul Féret	(Greece) Hélène Contostavlos; 6–2, 6–3	(United Kingdom) Phyllis Satterthwaite		
5–11 Jan	Métropole Club de Cannes Beausite; Cannes, France	(United Kingdom) Hillyard (Monaco) Landau; 7–5, 6–4, 6–8, 2–6, 4–6	(Republic of Ireland) Rogers (France) Féret	(United Kingdom) Satterthwaite (United States) Ryan; 6–1, 6–2	(United Kingdom) Thomas; Taunay	(Republic of Ireland) Rogers (United States) Ryan; 6–3, 6–3	(Denmark) Worm (United Kingdom) Satterthwaite
10–17 Jan	Bristol Cup; Menton, France	(Czechoslovakia) Karel Koželuh; 6–1, 6–3, 5–7, 6–4	(Republic of Ireland) Albert Burke				
10–17 Jan	Bristol Cup; Menton, France	(Republic of Ireland) Burke (France) Plaa; 6–2, 3–6, 3–6, 7–5, 6–3	(Czechoslovakia) Koželuh (Weimar Republic) Najuch				
12–19 Jan	Italian Riviera championships Sanremo, Italy	(France) Jean Lesueur; 8–6, 7–5, 1–6, 3–6, 6–2	(France) Benny Berthet	(United Kingdom) Phyllis Satterthwaite; 5–7, 6–2, 6–2	(Italy) Lucia Valerio		
12–19 Jan	Italian Riviera championships Sanremo, Italy	(Italy) de Martino (France) Lesueur; 6–0, 7–5, 6–0	(Italy) Serventi (Italy) de Minerbi	(Italy) Valerio (United Kingdom) Soames; 6–3, 2–6, 6–3	(Italy) Riboli; Meunier	(Switzerland) Aeschlimann (United States) Ryan; 6–3, 2–6, 6–1	(Italy) de Stefani (Italy) Valerio
12–19 Jan	Nice L.T.C. Championships; Nice, France	(Republic of Ireland) George Lyttleton-Rogers; 6–4, 6–4, 8–6	(France) Edmond Lotan	(France) Rosie Berthet; 6–3, 7–5	(France) P. Marjollet		
12–19 Jan	Nice L.T.C. Championships; Nice, France	(Republic of Ireland) Rogers (France) Lotan; 7–5, 6–3, 6–4	Capt. Price; Poligny			(Republic of Ireland) Rogers (France) Berthet; 6–1, 6–0	J. Franks (Russia) Sumarokov
19–25 Jan	New Courts L.T.C. de Cannes; Cannes, France	(Switzerland) Max Ellmer; 6–3, 7–5	(United Kingdom) Brame Hillyard	(United Kingdom) Muriel Thomas; 6–1, 6–0	(France) Cosette St. Omer Roy		
19–25 Jan	New Courts L.T.C. de Cannes; Cannes, France	(United Kingdom) Hillyard; Minchin; 6–4, 6–2	(Switzerland) Ellmer; Natason			(United Kingdom) Thomas; Natason; 6–3, 6–4	(Switzerland) Ellmer (France) Omer Roy
Jan	Mannheim International Covered Courts tournament Mannheim, Weimar Republic			(Weimar Republic) Cilly Aussem; 6–2, 6–4	(Weimar Republic) Ilse Friedleben	(Weimar Republic) Aussem (Weimar Republic) Nourney; 12–10, 8–6	(Weimar Republic) Friedleben; Buss
Jan	Coupe de Noël; Paris, France	(France) René de Buzelet; 6–1, 6–3	(France) André Merlin	(France) Simone Barbier; 3–6, 6–2, 6–2	(France) Arlette Neufeld		
Jan	Coupe de Noël; Paris, France	(France) Glasser; Borotra; 6–3, 6–1, 6–4	(France) Gentien; Féret	(France) Guillier; Gallay; 6–4, 7–5	(France) Charnelet; Gallay	(France) Lesueur (United Kingdom) Noel; 6–4, 2–6, 8–6	(Spain) Maier (France) Adamoff
Jan	Sydney Metropolitan Club Championship; Sydney, Australia	(Australia) Harry Hopman; 6–2, 3–6, 6–0	(Australia) Jack Crawford				
Jan	Sydney Metropolitan Club Championship; Sydney, Australia	(Australia) Hopman (Australia) Crawford; 4–6, 6–2, 6–4	(Australia) Dunlop (Australia) Sproule			(Australia) Hopman (Australia) Eleanor Mary Hall; 6–2, 6–4	(Australia) Crawford (Australia) Crawford
26–31 Jan	Canadian Covered Court Championships; Montreal, Quebec, Canada	(United States) George Lott; 6–2, 5–7, 1–6, 6–3	(United States) John Van Ryn				
26–31 Jan	Canadian Covered Court Championships; Montreal, Quebec, Canada	(United States) Lott (United States) Van Ryn; 18–16, 6–3, 6–1	(United States) Gilbert Hall (Canada) Ch. W. Leslie				
24–31 Jan	New South Wales Championships; Sydney, Australia	(Australia) Jack Crawford; 3–6, 6–3, 6–4, 6–4	(Australia) Harry Hopman	(Australia) Marjorie Cox Crawford; 7–5, 6–2	(Australia) Ula Valkenburg		
24–31 Jan	New South Wales Championships; Sydney, Australia	(Australia) Crawford (Australia) Hopman; 6–2, 6–3, 3–6, 6–3	(Australia) Willard; Thompson	(Australia) Crawford (Australia) Cozens; 6–1, 8–6	(Australia) Valkenburg; Dingle	(Australia) Willard; Pinckerton; 6–4, 6–2	(Australia) Crawford (Australia) Crawford
19–26 Jan	New Court Lawn Tennis Club II. Cannes, France	(Republic of Ireland) George Lyttleton-Rogers; 6–0, 6–4, 6–4	(France) Benny Berthet	(United Kingdom) Phyllis Satterthwaite; 6–3, 10–8	(Italy) Lucia Valerio		
19–26 Jan	New Court Lawn Tennis Club II. Cannes, France	(Republic of Ireland) Lyttleton-Rogers (United Kingdom) Hillyard; 2–6, 6–2, 6–2, 3–6, 8–6	(France) Berthet (Czechoslovakia) Hecht	(United States) Ryan (United Kingdom) Satterthwaite; 6–1, 6–2	(Italy) Valerio (Netherlands) Mrs. Taunay	(Switzerland) Aeschlimann (United Kingdom) Thomas w/o	(Republic of Ireland) Lyttleton-Rogers (United States) Ryan
-31 Jan	All-India national championships Allahabad, India	(British Raj) Dip Narain Kapoor		(British Raj) Leila Row; N/A	(British Raj) Lena McKenna		
-31 Jan	All-India national championships Allahabad, India	(British Raj) E. Vivian Bobb (British Raj) Ahad Hussain; N/A, N/A, 6–3	(British Raj) Edwards (British Raj) Michelmore			(British Raj) Bobb (British Raj) Miss Roberts Sandison; 10–8, N/A, N/A	(British Raj) Ahad Hussain (British Raj) Leila Row

== February ==
- Dutch player Hendrik Timmer was hit by a disease and missed the season. Two Dutch female players announced their engagements and subsequently their retirement from professional sports. Netherlands' number one Kea Bouman married in Almelo and moved to Java while second ranked Margaretha Dros-Canters married and decided to dedicate herself solely to her marriage after the season.
- The strike of the German tennis players continued from last month and caused a major setback on the indoor tournaments. Thus the German International Covered Courts tournament field was dominated by foreign and senior players such as World War I French veteran Eugene Broquedis who reached the semifinal of the singles and the final of the doubles competition despite being 45 years old and having his right shoulder and two fingers paralyzed in the war.
- Newcomer young German tennis player Harry Schwenker shocked the tennis world by defeating Italian champion Umberto De Morpurgo in the semifinals of the Berlin Covered Court Championships. He went on to defeat Austrian champion Hermann Artens in the final of his debut tournament. The match lasted until midnight.
- Jack Crawford won his first Australian Championships singles and mixed doubles title (partnering his wife Marjorie Cox Crawford). He defeated last year's runner-up Harry Hopman for the singles title and teamed up with him for the doubles. He didn't succeed in defending his doubles title losing to Donohoe/Dunlap in the final.
- The team of England played Denmark in Copenhagen as part of their North Europe indoors exhibition tour and drew 4–4.
- Takeichi Harada announced he will skip the Davis Cup due to his business affairs.
- Jacques Brugnon swept all possible titles at the Gallia L. T. C. de Cannes.

Month	Event	Men		Women		Mixed	
Month	Event	Champions	Runner-up	Champions	Runner-up	Champions	Runner-up
20 January – February 1	Gallia L. T. C. de Cannes; Cannes, France	(France) Jacques Brugnon; 6–8, 6–0, 6–4. 4–6, 6–0	(Republic of Ireland) George Lyttleton-Rogers	(United Kingdom) Phyllis Satterthwaite; 5–7, 7–5, 10–8	(Italy) Lucia Valerio		
20 January – February 1	Gallia L. T. C. de Cannes; Cannes, France	(France) Brugnon (France) du Plaix; 6–2, 6–2, 6–3	(United Kingdom) Hillyard (Denmark) Worm	(United States) Ryan (Italy) Valerio; 6–1, 10–8	(United Kingdom) Satterthwaite (United Kingdom) Thomas	(France) Brugnon (United States) Ryan; 6–2, 1–6, 6–4	(Italy) Del Bono (Italy) Valerio
January–February 1	Berlin International Covered Courts tournament Berlin, Weimar Republic	(Weimar Republic) Harry Schwenker; 8–10, 6–1, 6–3, 6–1	(Austria) Hermann Artens	(Weimar Republic) Hilde Krahwinkel; 6–2, 2–6, 7–5	(Weimar Republic) Irmgard Rost		
January–February 1	Berlin International Covered Courts tournament Berlin, Weimar Republic	(Hungary) Kehrling (Italy) Morpurgo; 1–6, 14–12, 4–6, 6–3, 6–4	(Austria) Artens (Weimar Republic) Kleinschroth	(Weimar Republic) Krahwinkel (Weimar Republic) Rost; N/A	(Weimar Republic) Strauch; Kuhlmann	(Weimar Republic) Krahwinkel (Hungary) Kehrling; N/A	(Weimar Republic) Henkel; Löwenthal
January 24 – February 2	French Covered Court Championships; Paris, France	(France) Jean Borotra; 6–3, 11–9, 5–7, 6–4	(France) Jean Lesueur	(France) Germaine Golding; 6–2, 2–6, 6–0	(France) Arlette Neufeld		
January 24 – February 2	French Covered Court Championships; Paris, France	(France) Boussus (France) de Buzelet; 8–6, 6–3, 9–7	(Sweden) Östberg (France) Thurneyssen	(France) Barbier (France) Neufeld; 6–3, 6–2	(France) Conquet (France) Culbert	(France) Féret (France) le Besnerais; 7–5, 6–4	(France) Martin-Legeay (France) Guillier
2–8 February	Carlton L. T. C. de Cannes; Cannes, France	(Republic of Ireland) George Lyttleton-Rogers; 6–3, 6–3, 6–2	(Czechoslovakia) Ladislav Hecht	(United States) Elizabeth Ryan; 6–4, 6–2	(United Kingdom) Phyllis Satterthwaite		
2–8 February	Carlton L. T. C. de Cannes; Cannes, France	(France) Cochet (France) Brugnon; 4–6, 7–5, 6–3, 11–9	(Republic of Ireland) Rogers (Switzerland) Aeschlimann	(United Kingdom) Satterthwaite; Thomas w/o	(United States) Ryan (Weimar Republic) Aussem	(Italy) Del Bono (United Kingdom) Soames w/o	(United Kingdom) Hillyard (United States) Ryan
2–8 February	German International Covered Courts tournament Bremen, Weimar Republic	(France) Pierre Henri Landry; 6–3, 6–0, 2–6, 6–3	(Denmark) Einer Ulrich	(Weimar Republic) Hilde Krahwinkel; 6–2, 6–3	(Weimar Republic) Irmgard Rost	Consolation Men singles champion (Weimar Republic) Friedrich Frenz	Consolation Women singles champion (Denmark) Else Dam
2–8 February	German International Covered Courts tournament Bremen, Weimar Republic	(Sweden) Östberg (Denmark) Ulrich; 6–4, 6–4, 6–3	(France) Landry (France) Broquedis	(Weimar Republic) Krahwinkel; Peitz; 6–2, 6–4	(Norway) Werring; Anderssen	(Weimar Republic) H. Macenthum; Hoffmann; 6–2, 6–1	(Weimar Republic) L. Lorentz (Denmark) Hilde Sperling
February	Belgian International Covered Courts tournament Belgium	(Belgium) André Lacroix; 3–6, 6–4, 6–1	(Belgium) André Ewbank	(Belgium) Emile Dupont; 7–5, 6–2	(Belgium) Leonie Lhoest		
February	Belgian International Covered Courts tournament Belgium	(Belgium) de Borman; Van Zuylen; 6–0, 9–7, 6–1	Borin; Jacques	(Belgium) Sigart (Belgium) Dupont; 6–0, 6–0	Parentini; Portilije	(Belgium) Lacroix (Belgium) Sigart; 6–4, 6–2	de la Mare/Pennart
February	Czechoslovakia pros vs. South Africa amateurs third meeting Cape Town, South Africa; 0–6	(South Africa) Louis Raymond; 6–2, 6–4	(Czechoslovakia) Karel Koželuh				
February	Czechoslovakia pros vs. South Africa amateurs third meeting Cape Town, South Africa; 0–6	(South Africa) Louis Raymond; 6–4, 6–3	(Czechoslovakia) Pavel Macenauer				
February	Czechoslovakia pros vs. South Africa amateurs third meeting Cape Town, South Africa; 0–6	(South Africa) Vernon Kirby; 2–6, 6–3, 6–0	(Czechoslovakia) Pavel Macenauer				
February	Czechoslovakia pros vs. South Africa amateurs third meeting Cape Town, South Africa; 0–6	(South Africa) Vernon Kirby; 6–2, 3–6, 8–6	(Czechoslovakia) Karel Koželuh				
February	Czechoslovakia pros vs. South Africa amateurs third meeting Cape Town, South Africa; 0–6	(South Africa) Raymond (South Africa) Condon; 7–5, 6–2	(Czechoslovakia) Macenauer (Czechoslovakia) Koželuh				
February	Czechoslovakia pros vs. South Africa amateurs third meeting Cape Town, South Africa; 0–6	(South Africa) Raymond (South Africa) Condon; 6–4, 6–3	(Czechoslovakia) Macenauer (Czechoslovakia) Koželuh				
February	Monegasque International Championships; Monte Carlo, Monaco	(Spain) Enrique Maier; 6–2, 5–7, 6–1, 6–3	(Austria) Hermann Artens	(France) Simonne Mathieu; 7–5, 3–6, 6–3	(Weimar Republic) Cilly Aussem		
February	Monegasque International Championships; Monte Carlo, Monaco	(France) Boussus (France) Lesueur; 6–3, 3–6, 4–6, 6–2, 6–4	(Italy) Del Bono (Italy) Gaslini	(Weimar Republic) Aussem (Italy) Valerio; 6–4, 7–5	(France) Barbier (France) Mathieu		
February 9–16	South of France Championships; Nice, France	(Republic of Ireland) George Lyttleton-Rogers; 4–6, 0–6, 6–3, 6–4, 5–0 ret.	(France) Christian Boussus	(United Kingdom) Phyllis Satterthwaite; 6–1, 6–3	(France) Paulette Marjollet		
February 9–16	South of France Championships; Nice, France	(France) Boussus (France) du Plaix; 6–3, 1–6, 2–6, 11–9, 6–3	(Denmark) Worm (Switzerland) Aeschlimann	(United Kingdom) Satterthwaite (United Kingdom) Thomas; 6–1, 6–1	(France) Marjollet; J. Martin	(United Kingdom) Hillyard (United Kingdom) Thomas; 6–2, 6–4	(France) Boussus (Weimar Republic) Aussem
February 17–24	St. Moritz Covered Courts Championship; St. Moritz, Switzerland	(France) Georges Glasser; 6–2, 4–6, 6–1	(France) Paul Barrelet de Ricou	(France) Arlette Neufeld; 6–3, 9–11, 6–0	(Weimar Republic) Ilse Friedleben		
February 17–24	St. Moritz Covered Courts Championship; St. Moritz, Switzerland	(France) Glasser (France) Gentien; 4–6, 6–4, 7–5, 6–3	(Weimar Republic) Buss (Weimar Republic) Oppenheimer			(France) Glasser (France) Neufeld; 6–1, 6–3	(Weimar Republic) Buss (Weimar Republic) Friedleben
February 16–22	Hotel Bristol Championships; Beaulieu, France	(Republic of Ireland) George Lyttleton-Rogers; 6–1, 10–8, 3–6, 5–7, 6–3	(France) Emmanuel Du Plaix	(United Kingdom) Phyllis Satterthwaite; 6–2, 6–1	(United Kingdom) Mary Heeley		
February 16–22	Hotel Bristol Championships; Beaulieu, France	(Kingdom of Yugoslavia) Šefer; Kukuljevic; 6–1, 1–6, 7–5, 3–6, 6–l	(Republic of Ireland) Rogers (United Kingdom) Olliff	(United States) Andrus (United States) Ryan; 6–4, 6–2	(United Kingdom) Satterthwaite/Thomas	(United Kingdom) Hillyard (United Kingdom) Heeley; 2–6, 6–4, 6–4	(United Kingdom) Olliff (United Kingdom) Nuthall
February 18; February 19; February 20; February 22; February 23; February 24; February 25; February 28; March 2	World's Indoor Professional Championship; New York, United States; Baltimore, United States; Boston, United States; Cincinnati, United States; Youngstown, United States; Columbus, United States; Chicago, United States; Detroit, United States; Omaha, United States	(United States) Bill Tilden; 6–2, 6–4, 6–1	(Czechoslovakia) Karel Koželuh				
February 18; February 19; February 20; February 22; February 23; February 24; February 25; February 28; March 2	World's Indoor Professional Championship; New York, United States; Baltimore, United States; Boston, United States; Cincinnati, United States; Youngstown, United States; Columbus, United States; Chicago, United States; Detroit, United States; Omaha, United States	(United States) Bill Tilden; 6–4, 6–2, 6–4	(Czechoslovakia) Karel Koželuh				
February 18; February 19; February 20; February 22; February 23; February 24; February 25; February 28; March 2	World's Indoor Professional Championship; New York, United States; Baltimore, United States; Boston, United States; Cincinnati, United States; Youngstown, United States; Columbus, United States; Chicago, United States; Detroit, United States; Omaha, United States	(United States) Bill Tilden; 6–4, 2–6, 6–2, 7–5	(Czechoslovakia) Karel Koželuh				
February 18; February 19; February 20; February 22; February 23; February 24; February 25; February 28; March 2	World's Indoor Professional Championship; New York, United States; Baltimore, United States; Boston, United States; Cincinnati, United States; Youngstown, United States; Columbus, United States; Chicago, United States; Detroit, United States; Omaha, United States	(United States) Bill Tilden; 8–6, 6–3	(Czechoslovakia) Karel Koželuh				
February 18; February 19; February 20; February 22; February 23; February 24; February 25; February 28; March 2	World's Indoor Professional Championship; New York, United States; Baltimore, United States; Boston, United States; Cincinnati, United States; Youngstown, United States; Columbus, United States; Chicago, United States; Detroit, United States; Omaha, United States	(United States) Bill Tilden; 6–3, 6–4	(Czechoslovakia) Karel Koželuh				
February 18; February 19; February 20; February 22; February 23; February 24; February 25; February 28; March 2	World's Indoor Professional Championship; New York, United States; Baltimore, United States; Boston, United States; Cincinnati, United States; Youngstown, United States; Columbus, United States; Chicago, United States; Detroit, United States; Omaha, United States	(United States) Bill Tilden; 0–6, 6–2, 6–3	(Czechoslovakia) Karel Koželuh				
February 18; February 19; February 20; February 22; February 23; February 24; February 25; February 28; March 2	World's Indoor Professional Championship; New York, United States; Baltimore, United States; Boston, United States; Cincinnati, United States; Youngstown, United States; Columbus, United States; Chicago, United States; Detroit, United States; Omaha, United States	(United States) Bill Tilden; 7–5, 2–6, 6–3, ret.	(Czechoslovakia) Karel Koželuh				
February 18; February 19; February 20; February 22; February 23; February 24; February 25; February 28; March 2	World's Indoor Professional Championship; New York, United States; Baltimore, United States; Boston, United States; Cincinnati, United States; Youngstown, United States; Columbus, United States; Chicago, United States; Detroit, United States; Omaha, United States	(United States) Bill Tilden; 5–7, 6–4, 6–2, 10–8	(Czechoslovakia) Karel Koželuh				
February 18; February 19; February 20; February 22; February 23; February 24; February 25; February 28; March 2	World's Indoor Professional Championship; New York, United States; Baltimore, United States; Boston, United States; Cincinnati, United States; Youngstown, United States; Columbus, United States; Chicago, United States; Detroit, United States; Omaha, United States	(United States) Bill Tilden; 4–6, 2–6, 6–2, 6–4, 8–6	(Czechoslovakia) Karel Koželuh				
February 23–28	Bermuda International Championships; Hamilton, Bermuda	(United States) John Doeg; 6–4, 2–6, 6–1, 6–3	(United States) Berkeley Bell	(United States) Sarah Palfrey; 8–6, 6–2	(United States) Marjorie Morrill		
February 23–28	Bermuda International Championships; Hamilton, Bermuda	(United States) Sutter (United States) Bell; 6–3, 2–6, 4–6, 6–2, 6–3	(United States) Doeg (United States) Bowman	(United States) Morrill (United States) Anderson; 6–2, 6–2	(United States) Rice (United States) Harland	(United States) Bowman (United States) Palfrey; 6–3, 3–6, 7–5	(United States) Bell (United States) Rice
February 27	1931 Australian Championships; Sydney, Australia; Men's singles – Women's singles	(Australia) Jack Crawford; 6–4, 6–2, 2–6, 6–1	(Australia) Harry Hopman	(Australia) Coral McInnes Buttsworth; 1–6, 6–3, 6–4	(Australia) Marjorie Cox Crawford		
February 27	1931 Australian Championships; Sydney, Australia; Men's singles – Women's singles	(Australia) Donohoe (Australia) Dunlop; 8–6, 6–2, 5–7, 7–9, 6–4	(Australia) Crawford (Australia) Hopman	(Australia) Bickerton (Australia) Cozens; 6–0, 6–4	(Australia) Lloyd (Australia) Utz	(Australia) Crawford (Australia) Crawford; 7–5, 6–4	(Australia) Willard (Australia) Westacott

== March ==
- The city of London wins the 16th annual London-Paris tennis club competition (14–7).
- Béla von Kehrling repeated his 1929 feat by winning the triple crown again in the French Riviera Championships.
- George Lott won the Canadian Championships for the fourth time of his career.
- The team of Bremen defeated the players of Amsterdam by 10 to 7.
- The Fédération Française de Tennis issued legal proceedings against Henri Cochet because of a suspected breach of amateur tennis regulations.
- The legal proceedings against German Daniel Prenn ended with the conclusion that the accusations were misled by the confusion of similar family names.
- Nineteen-year-old national junior champion György Drjetomszky won his first Men's trophy at the Hungarian Covered Courts tournament and thus was invited to the Hungary Davis Cup team and to their first round match against Italy.
- Hamburg defeated Rhine Valley 6–5 in Hamburg.
- En route to Europe the Japanese Davis Cup team, headed by Jiro Sato and Hyotaro Sato, played exhibition matches in Singapore.
- The team of England defeated Sweden in their North Europe indoors exhibition tour 5–1, and Norway 9–0 two times in a row.
- René Lacoste and his doubles partner Jacques Brugnon both had appendicitis surgeries and subsequently missed the upcoming tournaments.
- Colin Gregory and Harry Lee announced they will miss the Davis Cup first round rubbers due to their business affairs.
- Iwao Aoki won a triple crown in the Surrey Grass Court Championships.
- Harry Hopman was victorious at the singles, doubles and mixed doubles event at the South Australian Championship.
- On 20 March in the assembly of the International Tennis Federation in Paris the Norges Tennisforbund (Norway Tennis Association) was granted membership into the ITF.
- The team of France defeated the United States team 3–2 in a five–match indoors competition played at the Seventh Regiment Armory in New York from March 23 through March 25.

Month	Event	Men		Women		Mixed	
Month	Event	Champions	Runner-up	Champions	Runner-up	Champions	Runner-up
– March 14	Southern Professional Championships; Palm Beach, United States	(United States) Paul Heston; 6–1, 6–2, 6–3	James Kenney				
– March 14	Southern Professional Championships; Palm Beach, United States	(United States) Aguther (United States) Heston; 6–2, 6–2, 6–4	(United States) Kenney (United States) Rogers				
February 23 – March 1	Monte Carlo Cups; Monte Carlo, Monaco	(France) Henri Cochet; 7–5, 6–2, 6–4	(Republic of Ireland) George Lyttleton-Rogers	(France) Simonne Mathieu; 4–6, 6–4, 7–5	(United Kingdom) Phyllis Satterthwaite		
February 23 – March 1	Monte Carlo Cups; Monte Carlo, Monaco	(Hungary) Kehrling (Austria) Artens; 6–4, 7–5, 6–2	(Denmark) Worm (United Kingdom) Hillyard	(United Kingdom) Nuthall / (United Kingdom) Thomas vs. (United States) Andrus / (Italy) Valerio		(France) Cochet (United Kingdom) Benett; 6–0, 0–6, 6–3	(United Kingdom) Olliff (United Kingdom) Nuthall
February 23 – March 1	Monte Carlo Cups; Monte Carlo, Monaco	Butler Trophy (Spain) Maier / (Spain) Sindreu def. (Hungary) Kehrling / (Hungary) Gabrovitz; 6–4, 6–4, 6–2		Beaumont Trophy (United Kingdom) Nuthall / (United Kingdom) Benett def. (United Kingdom) Heeley / (United Kingdom) Thomas; 6–2, 6–3			
February 23 – March 3	Pan-American Tennis Championships; Miami Beach United States	(United States) George Lott; 6–2, 1–6, 6–2, 6–4	(United States) John Van Ryn				
February 23 – March 3	Pan-American Tennis Championships; Miami Beach United States	(United States) Lott (United States) Van Ryn; 6–2, 4–6, 6–2, 6–1	(United States) Hall (United States) Rainville				
March 2–8	French Riviera Championships and Nations Cup; Menton, France	(Hungary) Béla von Kehrling; 7–5, 6–2, 6–4	(Republic of Ireland) George Lyttleton-Rogers	(United Kingdom) Phyllis Satterthwaite; 7–5, 6–4	(France) Simonne Mathieu		
March 2–8	French Riviera Championships and Nations Cup; Menton, France	(Hungary) Kehrling (Republic of Ireland) Rogers; 6–2, 6–2, 9–7	(Socialist Federal Republic of Yugoslavia) Šefer (Socialist Federal Republic of Yugoslavia) Kukuljevic	(United Kingdom) Heeley (United Kingdom) Nuthall; 6–3, 6–1	(United States) Andrus; Hilleary	(Hungary) Kehrling (Weimar Republic) Aussem; 4–6, 6–3, 6–4	(Switzerland) Aeschlimann (United Kingdom) Nuthall
March 4–8	Hungarian Covered Courts tournament Budapest, Hungary	(Hungary) György Drjetomszky; N/A	(Hungary) György Bánó	(Hungary) Mrs. Schréder Lászlóné; N/A	(Hungary) Eszter Demko		
March 4–8	Hungarian Covered Courts tournament Budapest, Hungary	(Hungary) Straub (Hungary) Straub; 6–3, 6–2, 6–3	(Hungary) Balázs (Hungary) Vásárhelyi	N/A	N/A	(Hungary) Silbersdorf (Hungary) Mrs. Schréder; N/A	(Hungary) Balás (Hungary) Sárkány
March 9–15	Parc Imperial L.T.C. de Nice; Nice, France	(France) Léonce Aslangul; 0–6, 2–6, 6–3, 6–3, 6–2	(Switzerland) Charles Aeschlimann	(United Kingdom) Betty Nuthall; 6–0, 3–6, 8–6	(France) Simonne Mathieu		
March 9–15	Parc Imperial L.T.C. de Nice; Nice, France	(Switzerland) Aeschlimann (United Kingdom) Hillyard; 6–2, 6–1, 6–0	(Socialist Federal Republic of Yugoslavia) Šefer (Socialist Federal Republic of Yugoslavia) Kukuljevic			(France) Lesueur (France) Mathieu; 6–2, 6–2	(Socialist Federal Republic of Yugoslavia) Šefer (United Kingdom) Nuthall
March 9–18	Bordighera Championships; Bordighera, Italy	(Republic of Ireland) George Lyttleton-Rogers; 1–6, 6–3, 6–4, 0–6, 6–4	(Hungary) Béla von Kehrling	(Weimar Republic) Ilse Friedleben; 5–7, 6–4, 6–4	(United Kingdom) Phyllis Satterthwaite		
March 9–18	Bordighera Championships; Bordighera, Italy	(Republic of Ireland) Rogers (Italy) Del Bono; 6–3, 6–4, 2–6, 6–2	(Hungary) Kehrling (Monaco) Landau	(United States) Andrus; Hilleary; 6–3, 3–6, 6–3	(Weimar Republic) Friedleben (United Kingdom) Satterthwaite	(Italy) Del Bono (United States) Andrus; 6–3, 6–3	(Hungary) Kehrling (United Kingdom) Satterthwaite
March	Canadian International Championships; Montreal, Quebec, Canada	(United States) George Lott; 6–3, 6–3, 6–4	(United States) Berkeley Bell				
March	Canadian International Championships; Montreal, Quebec, Canada	(United States) Van Ryn (United States) Lott; 6–2, 6–1, 6–2	(Canada) Laframboise (Canada) Wright				
March	Santa Marguerita Tournament; Santa Marguerita, Italy			(Germany) Ilse Friedleben; 6–4, 6–8, ret.	(Germany) Nelly Neppach		
March	Santa Marguerita Tournament; Santa Marguerita, Italy					(Germany) Neppach; Buss; 6–3, 6–2	(Germany) Friedleben; Galindez
March	Negresco hotel Championships; Nice, France			(Hungary) Magda Baumgarten; N/A	N/A		
March	Surrey Grass Court Championships; London, Great Britain	(Empire of Japan) Iwao Aoki; N/A	N/A				
March	Surrey Grass Court Championships; London, Great Britain	(Empire of Japan) Iwao Aoki; N/A	N/A	(Empire of Japan) Iwao Aoki; N/A	N/A		
March	Bengal Lawn Tennis Championship; Calcutta, British India	(United Kingdom) Patrick Hughes; 4–6, 6–1, 6–1, 6–0	(United Kingdom) George Perkins				
14–21 March	American Covered Court Championships; New York, United States (men); Brookline, United States (women)	(France) Jean Borotra; 6–1, 3–6, 6–4, 3–6, 6–4	(United States) Berkeley Bell	(United States) Marjorie Sachs; 6–3, 7–5	(United States) Sarah Palfrey		
14–21 March	American Covered Court Championships; New York, United States (men); Brookline, United States (women)	(France) Borotra (France) Boussus; 7–5, 6–4, 5–7, 6–4	(France) Landry (United States) Sutter	(United States) Palfrey (United States) Wightman; 7–5, 6–0	(United States) Blake (United States) Fuller Hubbard	(United States) Palfrey; Rice; 6–4, 6–4	(United States) Mrs. Guild (United States) Guild
16–22 March	Côte d'Azur Championships; Cannes, France	(Republic of Ireland) George Lyttleton-Rogers; 1–6, 6–2, 4–6, 6–1, 9–7	(Switzerland) Charles Aeschlimann	(United Kingdom) Phyllis Satterthwaite; 6–2, 6–0	(Switzerland) Lolette Payot		
16–22 March	Côte d'Azur Championships; Cannes, France	(Republic of Ireland) Rogers (United Kingdom) Hillyard; 10–8, 6–4, 9–7	(Switzerland) Aeschlimann; Chiesa	(United States) Ryan (Weimar Republic) Aussem; 6–0, 6–3	(United Kingdom) Satterthwaite (United Kingdom) Thomas	(Switzerland) Aeschlimann (Switzerland) Payot; 6–2, 4–6, 6–2	(Republic of Ireland) Holmes; Mme Belliad
-22 March	South Australian Championships; Adelaide, Australia	(Australia) Harry Hopman; 6–2, 6–3, 6–3	(Australia) Adrian Quist	(Australia) Frances Hoddle-Wrigley; 6–3, 6–2	(Australia) Kathleen Le Messurier		
-22 March	South Australian Championships; Adelaide, Australia	(Australia) Hopman (Australia) Patterson; 6–2, 9–11, 9–11, 8–6, 7–5	(Australia) Schlesinger (Australia) Hone	(Australia) Le Messurier (Australia) Weston; 6–4, 6–2	(Australia) Wood (Australia) Toyne	(Australia) Hopman (Australia) Wood; 6–1, 6–3	(Australia) Gatfey (Australia) Toyne
26–28 March	Davis Cup South America first round Asunción, Paraguay	First round winners Argentina 5–0	First round losers Paraguay				
23–29 March	Beausite Club de Cannes second meeting Cannes, France	(Empire of Japan) Hyotaro Sato; 3–6, 6–4, 6–1, 8–6	(Republic of Ireland) George Lyttleton-Rogers	(Weimar Republic) Cilly Aussem; 6–3, 6–3	(Switzerland) Lolette Payot		
23–29 March	Beausite Club de Cannes second meeting Cannes, France	(Empire of Japan) Sato (Empire of Japan) Sato; 6–1, 6–4, 6–4	(Czechoslovakia) Menzel (Weimar Republic) Haensch	(United States) Ryan (Weimar Republic) Aussem; 6–0, 6–2	(United Kingdom) Satterthwaite (United Kingdom) Thomas	(Republic of Ireland) Lyttleton-Rogers (United States) Ryan; 6–4, 4–6, 6–3	(United Kingdom) Hillyard (United Kingdom) Satterthwaite|
23–29 March	Hampstead tournament Hampstead, Great Britain	(United Kingdom) Herman David; 6–4, 3–6, 7–5	(United Kingdom) Keats Lester	(United Kingdom) Eileen Bennett Whittingstall; 6–3, 6–1	(United Kingdom) Betty Nuthall		

== April ==
- A British-only 16–men and 16 women trials was held at the Queen's Club by the Lawn Tennis Association to decide who was about to represent the Great Britain Davis Cup team in the 1931 Davis Cup. The final was played by Bunny Austin and Fred Perry. Bunny Austin won the contest three sets to two (3–6, 4–6, 8–6, 6–1, 7–5). Both went on to be selected in the upcoming Davis Cup rubbers.
- France won the friendly Davis Cup preparation match against the United States three to two.
- In an internationals tennis club challenge FC Lyon beats Uhlenhorster Klipper (4:3).
- Berlin overcame Prague in the two cities' tennis challenge (8–1).
- Ohye and Spier won the men's and women's singles title at the Java Championships.
- Japan beat Austria in a friendly Davis Cup match.
- Heinz Landmann missed Germany's Davis Cup first round because of his office duties.
- Hyotaro Sato won all three titles in the St. Raphaël T.C. Championships.

Month	Event	Men		Women		Mixed	
Month	Event	Champions	Runner-up	Champions	Runner-up	Champions	Runner-up
27 March – 4 April	Mid-Pacific Invitation Tennis Championships; Honolulu, Hawaii, United States	(United States) Wilmer Allison; 6–4, 6–2, 6–2	(United States) Gilbert Hall				
27 March – 4 April	Mid-Pacific Invitation Tennis Championships; Honolulu, Hawaii, United States	(United States) Allison (United States) Hall; 6–2, 0–6, 6–2, 6–4	(Empire of Japan) Kuwabara (Empire of Japan) Akimoto				
30 March – 5 April	St. Raphaël T.C. Championships; Saint-Raphaël, France	(Empire of Japan) Hyotaro Sato; 6–3, 8–6, 6–4	(Weimar Republic) Ludwig Haensch	(France) Ida Adamoff; 6–3, 6–0	(Czechoslovakia) Korotvickova		
30 March – 5 April	St. Raphaël T.C. Championships; Saint-Raphaël, France	(Empire of Japan) Sato (Empire of Japan) Sato; 6–2, 2–6, 6–4, 6–4	(Czechoslovakia) Menzel (Weimar Republic) Haensch	(United States) Ryan (United Kingdom) Thomas; 6–4, 6–4	(Greece) Nicolopoulo (France) Adamoff	(Empire of Japan) Sato (United Kingdom) Thomas; 9–7, 4–6, 6–4	(Switzerland) Aeschlimann (United States) Ryan
5 April	Swedish Indoors Championships; Stockholm, Sweden	(Sweden) Curt Östberg; 3 sets to 1	(Sweden) Ingvar Garell	(Sweden) Eyvor Aquilon; 2 sets to 1	(Sweden) Sigrid Fick		
5 April	Swedish Indoors Championships; Stockholm, Sweden	(Sweden) Östberg (Sweden) Ramberg; 3 sets to 1	(Sweden) A. Thorén; Garell	(Sweden) Fick (Sweden) Aquilon; 2 sets to 0	(Sweden) Ehrnfelt; Cederholm	(Sweden) Östberg (Sweden) Fick; 2 sets to 0	(Sweden) Ramberg; Ramberg
2–4 April	Davis Cup South America Semifinals; Buenos Aires, Argentina; Not held	Semifinals winners Argentina 5–0; Chile	Semifinals losers Uruguay; Brazil				
30 March – 5 April	New Orleans Country Club Invitational Tournament; New Orleans, United States	(United States) George Lott; 6–4, 6–2, 4–6, 1–6, 6–4	(United States) Clifford Sutter				
30 March – 5 April	New Orleans Country Club Invitational Tournament; New Orleans, United States	(United States) Sutter (United States) Vines; 6–3, 6–1, 4–6. 4–6, 6–3	(United States) Van Ryn (United States) Lott				
6–12 April	Beausoleil Cup; Monte Carlo, Monaco	(Empire of Japan) Jiro Sato; 6–4, 6–2, 6–2	(France) Alain Bernard	(Weimar Republic) Cilly Aussem; 6–1, 6–4	(Spain) Lilí de Álvarez		
6–12 April	Beausoleil Cup; Monte Carlo, Monaco	(France) Gentien (France) Lesueur; 6–4, 6–4, 6–4	(Empire of Japan) Sato (Empire of Japan) Sato	(United Kingdom) Satterthwaite (France) Henrotin; 6–4, 0–6, 6–1	(France) Neufeld (France) Adamoff	(France) Lesueur (France) Mathieu; 2–6, 6–1, 6–3	(United Kingdom) Satterthwaite (United Kingdom) Hillyard
6–13 April	River Oaks Invitational Tournament; Houston, United States	(United States) Ellsworth Vines; 6–3, 6–4, 7–5	(United States) Bruce Barnes				
6–13 April	River Oaks Invitational Tournament; Houston, United States	(United States) Lott (United States) Coen; 7–5, 6–1, 6–1	(United States) Barnes; Taylor				
April	Tripolis L. T. C. International Championships; Tripoli, Italian Tripolitania	(Italy) Giorgio de Stefani; 6–3, 6–4, 4–6, 6–3	(Italy) Alberto Del Bono	(Italy) Ucci Manzutto; 4–6, 6–2, 6–2	(Italy) Elisabetta Riboli		
April	Tripolis L. T. C. International Championships; Tripoli, Italian Tripolitania	(Italy) de Stefani; Del Bono; 2–6, 6–0, 7–5, 6–4	(Italy) Bonzi; Serventi			(Italy) Giorgi; Bonzi; 4–6, 6–0, 6–2	(Italy) Manzutto (Italy) Fé d'Ostiani
April	Monaco Championships; Nice, France	(France) Léonce Aslangul; 0–6, 2–6, 6–3, 6–3, 6–2	(Switzerland) Charles Aeschlimann	(United Kingdom) Betty Nuthall; 6–0, 3–6, 8–6	(France) Simonne Mathieu		
April	Monaco Championships; Nice, France			(United States) Ryan (Weimar Republic) Aussem; 6–2, 6–4	(United Kingdom) Satterthwaite (United Kingdom) Thomas	(France) Lesueur (France) Mathieu; 6–2, 6–2	(United Kingdom) Nuthall (Socialist Federal Republic of Yugoslavia) Šefer
April	Moncean Club Covered Court Championships; Paris, France	(France) Cochet (France) Féret; 6–2, 3–6, 6–l	(France) Laurentz; Thurneyssen			(France) Cochet|Rosambert; 3–6, 6–1, 6–5	(France) Thurneyssen; Gallay
April	South African Championships; Johannesburg, South Africa	(South Africa) Louis Raymond; 6–3, 4–6, 6–4, 6–2	(South Africa) Maxwell Bertram	(South Africa) Bobbie Heine; 6–3, 6–3	(South Africa) Ruth Miller		
April	South African Championships; Johannesburg, South Africa	(South Africa) Kirby (South Africa) Farquharson; N/A	N/A			(South Africa) Lowe; Miller; 6–4, 6–2	(South Africa) Farquharson (South Africa) Heine
April	Danish Covered Court Championships; Copenhagen, Denmark	(France) Henri Cochet; 2–6, 6–0, 6–4, 8–6	(Denmark) Einer Ulrich	(France) Jacqueline Gallay; 6–4, 3–6, 6–4	(Denmark) Else Dam		
April	Danish Covered Court Championships; Copenhagen, Denmark	(Denmark) Gleerup/Henriksen; 3–6, 2–6, 6–2, 6–3, 8–6	(Denmark) Ulrich; Winther	(France) Gallay (France) Barbier; 6–0, 6–2	(Denmark) Dam; Støckel	(France) Cochet (France) Barbier; 4–6, 6–2, 6–2	(France) Bernard (France) Gallay
April	Spanish Championships; Barcelona, Spain	(Spain) Enrique Maier; 6–4, 5–7, 7–5, 6–2, 6–1	(Spain) Manuel Alonso	(Spain) Bella Duttón de Pons; N/A	(Spain) Josefa Chávarri		
April	Spanish Championships; Barcelona, Spain	(Spain) Flaquer/Durall; N/A	(Spain) Tejada (Spain) Alfredo Riera	(Spain) de Pons; Torres; N/A	(Spain) L.E. Benet; Y. Chailly	(Spain) Maier; Torres; N/A	(Spain) Saprissa; Y. Chailly
April	Kensington L. T. C London, Great Britain	(Empire of Japan) Iwao Aoki; 3–6, 6–1, 6–3	(United Kingdom) John Olliff	(United Kingdom) Dorothy Round; 6–4, 6–2	(United Kingdom) Joan Ridley		
April	Kensington L. T. C London, Great Britain	(Empire of Japan) Aoki; Miki; 6–2, 9–7	(United Kingdom) Austin (United Kingdom) Olliff				
19–26 April	Eastern Mediterranean Championship; Athens, Greece	(Weimar Republic) Gottfried von Cramm; 7–5, 4–6, 8–6, 6–1	(France) Benny Berthet	(Weimar Republic) Irmgard Rost; 6–4, 6–3	(Weimar Republic) Nelly Neppach		
19–26 April	Eastern Mediterranean Championship; Athens, Greece	(Weimar Republic) Cramm; Kleinschrott; 7–9, 6–3, 6–2, 6–4	(Egypt) Grandguillot; Shukry	(Greece) Vlasto/Lenos; 6–1, 6–1	(Greece) Campbell (Weimar Republic) Neppach	(Egypt) Grandguillot (Greece) Vlasto; 6–2, 4–6, 6–3	(Greece) Balli/Lenos
24–26 April	Davis Cup South America Final; Santiago, Chile	Final winners Argentina 3–0	Final losers Chile				
20–26 April	Miramar L.T.C. Juan-les-Pins, France	(Empire of Japan) Hyotaro Sato; 6–3, 6–2, 5–7, 3–6, 6–3	(Empire of Japan) Jiro Sato	(Weimar Republic) Cilly Aussem; 6–2, 6–0	(France) Sylvie Jung Henrotin		
20–26 April	Miramar L.T.C. Juan-les-Pins, France	(Empire of Japan) Sato; Kawachi; 9–11, 6–4, 6–4, 6–4	(United Kingdom) Hillyard (Switzerland) Aeschlimann	(Weimar Republic) Aussem (France) Henrotin; 7–5, 6–3	(United Kingdom) Satterthwaite (United Kingdom) Thomas	(Denmark) Worm (France) Henrotin; 6–1, 6–3	(Empire of Japan) Sato (Weimar Republic) Aussem
23–26 April	Ojai Tennis Tournament; Ojai, CA, United States	(United States) Ellsworth Vines; 5–7, 6–2, 6–2	(United States) Lester Stoefen	(United States) Dorothy Weisel Hack; 7–5, 6–0	(United States) Ethel Burkhardt		
23–26 April	Ojai Tennis Tournament; Ojai, CA, United States	(United States) Tidball; Bartosh; 6–4, 7–5	(United States) Vines (United States) Casey			(United States) Wills Moody (United States) Neer; 6–2, 6–3	(United States) Weisel (United States) Hall
23–30 April	Ceylon Championships; Colombo, Ceylon	(Dominion of Ceylon) Nicholas; 5–7, 7–5, 5–7, 7–5, 6–2	(Dominion of Ceylon) Churchill Hector Gunasekara	(Dominion of Ceylon) Steiger; 6–3, 7–5	(Dominion of Ceylon) Nedra Obeysekera		
23–30 April	Ceylon Championships; Colombo, Ceylon	(Dominion of Ceylon) O. Manuel Lisboa Pinto/Nicholas; 4–6, 6–4, 7–5, 6–3	Gunasekara/Rennie	(Dominion of Ceylon) Norman/Wright; 6–2, 6–3	(Dominion of Ceylon) Doreen Sansoni; Pat Weinman	(Dominion of Ceylon) Rennie/Norman; 6–2, 6–4	(Dominion of Ceylon) de Saram; Pieris

== May ==
- Roderich Menzel moved to Berlin to work at the publisher Ullstem Verlag and pursue tennis at the Rot-Weiss Tennis Club.
- George Lyttleton-Rogers won the 31st edition of the Parthenopean Championship. He was also a runner-up for the doubles, which was won by De Stefani/Del Bono team.
- Mrs. Schréder was granted a double prize at the Balkan Cup. Along with the annual porcelain cup awarded to the winner exceptionally she received the silver traveling trophy as well (awarded permanently only to three times champions).

Month	Event	Men		Women		Mixed	
Month	Event	Champions	Runner-up	Champions	Runner-up	Champions	Runner-up
1–3 May; 1–3 May; 16–18 April; 1–3 May; 1–3 May; 26–28 March; April; May	Davis Cup Europe First Round; Budapest, Kingdom of Hungary; Montreux, Switzerland; Athens, Greece; Düsseldorf, Weimar Republic; Mexico City, Mexico; Plymouth, Great Britain; Prague, Czechoslovakia	First Round winners Italy 4–1; Ireland 5–0; Greece 3–2; South Africa 5–0; United States 5–0; Great Britain 5–0; Czechoslovakia 3–2	First Round losers Hungary; Switzerland; Austria; Germany; Mexico; Monaco; Spain				
27 April – 2 May	British Hard Court Championships; Bournemouth, Great Britain	(France) Christian Boussus; 8–6, 6–4, 4–6, 6–2	(United Kingdom) Patrick Hughes	(France) Simonne Mathieu; 6–4, 6–4	(United Kingdom) Mary Heeley		
27 April – 2 May	British Hard Court Championships; Bournemouth, Great Britain	(United Kingdom) Austin; Kingsley; 10–8, 9–7, 6–1	(United Kingdom) Perry; Olliff	(United Kingdom) Nuthall (United States) Ryan; 6–2, 6–3	(United Kingdom) Shepherd-Barron (United Kingdom) Mudford	(United Kingdom) Perry (United Kingdom) Heeley; 3–6, 9–7, 7–5	(South Africa) Spence (United Kingdom) Nuthall
3–10 May	Austrian Championships; Vienna, Austria	(Austria) Franz Wilhelm Matejka; 8–6, 6–2, 6–4	(Austria) Hermann Artens				
May	Austrian International Championships; Vienna, Austria	(France) Henri Cochet; 4–6, 6–1, 6–1, 6–4	(Czechoslovakia) Roderich Menzel	(Weimar Republic) Cilly Aussem; 6–4, 6–2	(Weimar Republic) Irmgard Rost		
May	Austrian International Championships; Vienna, Austria	(Spain) Maier (Spain) Alonso; 6–4, 5–7, 6–4, 6–4	(France) Cochet (France) Merlin	(United States) Andrus (United States) Hilleary; 7–6, 6–3	(Weimar Republic) Aussem (Italy) Valerio	(Spain) Maier (Weimar Republic) Aussem; 6–1, 6–2	(Weimar Republic) Rost (Hungary) Kehrling
May	Campionato Partenopeo; Naples, Italy	(Republic of Ireland) George Lyttleton-Rogers; 8–6, 3–6, 8–6, 6–1	(Italy) Giorgio de Stefani	(France) Simone Barbier; 6–0, 6–1	(France) Jacqueline Gallay		
May	Campionato Partenopeo; Naples, Italy	(Italy) de Stefani (Italy) Del Bono; 6–0, 6–4, 3–6, 5–7, 10–8	(Italy) Martino (Republic of Ireland) Rogers	(France) Barbier; Gallay; 6–2, 6–0	(Italy) Manzutto/de Simone	(France) Bernard (France) Barbier; 6–1, 6–3	(France) Barrelet de Ricou (France) Gallay
May	L. T. C. di Rome International Championships; Rome, Italy	(Italy) Giorgio de Stefani; 4–6, 8–6, 7–5, 6–2	(Republic of Ireland) George Lyttleton-Rogers				
May	South Indian International Championships; British India	(British Raj) Manek Mehta; 6–2, 6–1	Roy				
May	South Indian International Championships; British India	(British Raj) Mehta/S.J. Matthews; 6–4, 7–5	(British Raj) Neilson/Ratnam				
May	Shambazar L. T. C. British India	(United Kingdom) George Perkins; 6–4, 6–2, 6–1	Matthews				
May	Northern Championships; Manchester, Great Britain	(United Kingdom) John Olliff; 6–3, 3–6, 7–9, 6–3 ret.	(United Kingdom) Nigel Sharpe	(United Kingdom) Evelyn Goldsworth; 8–10, 6–4, 6–3	(Egypt) E. Alexandroff		
May	Northern Championships; Manchester, Great Britain	(United Kingdom) Olliff (United Kingdom) Sharpe; 12–10, 6–4, 6–3	(United Kingdom) Soni / Hyatt	(United Kingdom) Lycett; Stevens; 6–3, 6–2	(United Kingdom) Hellewell (United Kingdom) Rudd	(United Kingdom) Burrows (United Kingdom) Lycett; 7–5, 2–6, 6–4	(British Raj) Soni (United Kingdom) Goldsworth
May 9 May 12; May 14; May 17	Professional World Champion title defense series New York, United States; Boston, United States; Philadelphia, United States; Chicago, United States	(United States) Bill Tilden (c); 5–7, 6–0, 6–1, 6–3	(United States) Vincent Richards				
May 9 May 12; May 14; May 17	Professional World Champion title defense series New York, United States; Boston, United States; Philadelphia, United States; Chicago, United States	(United States) Bill Tilden (c); 6–3, 3–6, 6–1, 1–6, 6–3	(United States) Vincent Richards				
May 9 May 12; May 14; May 17	Professional World Champion title defense series New York, United States; Boston, United States; Philadelphia, United States; Chicago, United States	(United States) Bill Tilden (c); 6–4, 7–5, 5–7, 6–2	(United States) Vincent Richards				
May 9 May 12; May 14; May 17	Professional World Champion title defense series New York, United States; Boston, United States; Philadelphia, United States; Chicago, United States	(United States) Bill Tilden (c); 3 sets to 2	(United States) Vincent Richards				
5–12 May	Italian Championships; Milan, Italy	(United Kingdom) George Patrick Hughes; 6–4, 6–3, 6–2	(France) Henri Cochet	(Italy) Lucia Valerio; 6–2, 2–6, 6–2	(United States) Dorothy Andrus		
5–12 May	Italian Championships; Milan, Italy	(United Kingdom) Hughes (Italy) Del Bono; 3–6, 8–6, 4–6, 6–4, 6–3	(France) Cochet (France) Merlin	(Italy) Gagliardi (Italy) Luzzatti; 6–3, 1–6, 6–3	(Italy) Valerio (United States) Andrus	(United Kingdom) Hughes (Italy) Valerio; 6–0, 6–1	(Italy) Del Bono (United States) Andrus
14–17 May	Belgian National Championships; Brussels, Belgium	(Belgium) Leopold de Borman; 2–6, 6–8, 6–2, 6–1, 6–4	(Belgium) André Ewbank	(Belgium) Josane Sigart; 6–0, 6–0	(Belgium) Marguerite de Monceau		
14–17 May	Belgian National Championships; Brussels, Belgium	(Belgium) de Borman (Belgium) Brouwet; 3–6, 9–7, 6–2, 6–2	(Belgium) Bemden/Derrider	(Belgium) Isaac (Belgium) Sigart; N/A	(Belgium)	(Belgium) Laloux (Belgium) Dupont	N/A
8–17 May	Bob Club's International Balkan Cup; Belgrade, Kingdom of Serbs, Croats and Slovenes	(Czechoslovakia) Ferenc Marsalek; N/A	(Weimar Republic) Heinz Eichner	(Hungary) Mrs. Schréder; 6–4, 2–6, 7–5	(Czechoslovakia) Anna Blanarova		
8–17 May	Bob Club's International Balkan Cup; Belgrade, Kingdom of Serbs, Croats and Slovenes	(Weimar Republic) Eichner (Weimar Republic) Henkel; N/A	(Czechoslovakia) Marsalek (Czechoslovakia) Siba	not contested		(Czechoslovakia) Marsalek (Czechoslovakia) Blanarova; 6–2, 6–3	(Hungary) László Silbersdorf; Mrs Schréder
8–17 May	Davis Cup Second Round; Helsinki, Finland; Zagreb, Yugoslavia; Brussels, Belgium; Dublin, Ireland; Athens, Greece; Turin, Italy; Oslo, Norway; Copenhagen, Denmark	Second Round winners Egypt 4–1; Japan 5–0; Great Britain 5–0; South Africa 4–1; Czechoslovakia 4–1; Italy 3–0; Poland 3–0; Denmark 5–0	Second Round losers Finland; Yugoslavia; Belgium; Ireland; Greece; Netherlands; Norway; Romania				
21–23 May	Davis Cup North/Central America Final; Montreal, Quebec, Canada	Final winners United States 4–1	Final losers Canada				
28–30 May	Davis Cup Americas Inter-Zonal round play-off Chevy Chase, United States	Final winners United States 5–0	Final losers Argentina				
17–31 May	1931 French Championships; Paris, France; Men's singles – Women's singles	(France) Jean Borotra; 2–6, 6–4, 7–5, 6–4	(France) Christian Boussus	(Weimar Republic) Cilly Aussem; 8–6, 6–1	(United Kingdom) Betty Nuthall		
17–31 May	1931 French Championships; Paris, France; Men's singles – Women's singles	(United States) Lott (United States) Van Ryn; 6–4, 6–3, 6–4	(South Africa) Kirby (South Africa) Farquharson	(United Kingdom) Bennett Whittingstall (United Kingdom) Nuthall; 9–7, 6–2	(Weimar Republic) Aussem (United States) Ryan	(South Africa) Spence (United Kingdom) Nuthall; 6–3, 5–7, 6–3	(United Kingdom) Austin (United Kingdom) Barron

== June ==
- Ernest Black, competitor for the first ever Davis Cup representing Great Britain, died.
- The Hungary-Yugoslavia friendly match was suspended due to rules interpretation differences.
- Daniel Prenn was suspended for six months by the German Tennis Union for charges that he demanded payment from racket manufacturer Hammer & Co. for using their equipment.
- The T. C. Barcelona—Rot-Weiss Tennis Club of Berlin interclub match was suspended due to heavy rain.
- Béla von Kehrling gave up the final of the Romanian Championships due to his bruised fingers.
- The United States Davis Cup team beat Austria by 5–0 in a friendly match played at the Vienna Park Club on 5–7 June.
- The United States Davis Cup team beat Germany by 5–0 in a friendly match played at the Blau-Weiss Tennis Club in Berlin on 12–14 June.
- Several US states held its national championships. Among them were:
  - The state tennis championships of Maryland was won by Berkeley Bell in three straight sets.
  - The state tennis championships of California was held in Berkeley from June 6 though June 14. The men's singles title was won by Ellsworth Vines and the doubles by Vines and Keith Gledhill. The women's singles was won by Alice Marble and the doubles by Marble and Dorothy Weisel.
  - The state tennis championships of Delaware was won by Wilmer Allison both in singles and in mixed doubles partnering Florence Lebontillier. Berkeley Bell and Eddie Jacobs were victorious in doubles. Marion Jessup won the ladies title.

Month	Event	Men		Women		Mixed	
Month	Event	Champions	Runner-up	Champions	Runner-up	Champions	Runner-up
20 May – 6 June	Davis Cup Quarterfinals; Paris, France; Eastbourne, England; Prague, Czechoslovakia; Copenhagen, Denmark	Quarterfinal winners Japan 5–0; Great Britain 5–0; Czechoslovakia 3–0; Denmark 3–2	Quarterfinal losers Egypt; South Africa; Italy; Poland				
4–7 June	Romanian International Championships; Bucharest, Romania	(Czechoslovakia) Josef Malacek; 0–6, 8–6, 3–6, 6–2, ret.	(Hungary) Béla von Kehrling	(Czechoslovakia) Anna Blanarova; 6–3, 6–2	(Hungary) Magda Baumgarten		
4–7 June	Romanian International Championships; Bucharest, Romania	(Czechoslovakia) Marsalek/Siba; 7–5, 5–7, 6–4, 6–3	(Socialist Federal Republic of Yugoslavia) Šefer/Kukuljevic	(Hungary) Baumgarten/Mrs. Schréder; 7–5, 6–2	(Czechoslovakia) Stavelova/Blanarova	(Czechoslovakia) Marsalek/Blanarova; 6–3, 4–6, 6–4	(Hungary) Kehrling/Mrs. Schréder
1–8 June	Brooklyn Championships; New York, United States	(United States) Edward Burns; 6–8, 6–3, 6–3, 6–3	(United States) Percy Kynaston				
1–8 June	Brooklyn Championships; New York, United States	(United States) Rockafellow/Aydelotte; 6–1, 6–0, 6–2	(United States) Burns (United States) Bell				
8–14 June	Czechoslovakian Championships; Prague, Czechoslovakia	(Empire of Japan) Hyotaro Sato; 5–7, 6–3, 6–1, 6–1	(Empire of Japan) Minoru Kawachi	(Weimar Republic) Hilde Krahwinkel; 6–4, 6–3	(France) Simonne Mathieu		
8–14 June	Czechoslovakian Championships; Prague, Czechoslovakia	(Czechoslovakia) Macenauer/Marsalek; 6–4, 6–1, 6–1	(Czechoslovakia) Hecht/Josef Malacek			(France) Glasser/Mathieu; 6–4, 6–4	(Czechoslovakia) Siba (Weimar Republic) Krahwinkel
June	Budapest International Championships; Budapest, Hungary	(Hungary) Béla von Kehrling; 6–0, 6–2, 6–1	(Hungary) Emil Gabrovitz	(Hungary) Magda Baumgarten; N/A	(Hungary) Mrs. Schréder		
June	Budapest International Championships; Budapest, Hungary	(Hungary) Kehrling/Gabrovitz; N/A	(Hungary) Balázs/Zichy	(Hungary) Mrs. Schréder/Mrs. Brandenburg	(Hungary) Baumgarten/Mrs. Herbst	(Hungary) Kehrling/Szapáry; N/A	(Hungary) Zichy/Jankovich
June	Warsaw International Championships; Warsaw, Poland	(Czechoslovakia) Ferenc Marsalek; 6–4, 6–2, 6–1	(Czechoslovakia) Josef Siba	(Poland) Elzbieta Lilpopovna; 6–2, 3–6, 6–4	(Poland) Ada Pozowska		
June	Warsaw International Championships; Warsaw, Poland	(Czechoslovakia) Marsalek/Siba; 6–3, 2–6, 6–1, 3–6, 6–4	(Hungary) Balázs/Zichy			(Czechoslovakia) Marsalek/Grenzanka; 6–4, 6–4	(Hungary) Balás/ (Poland) Pozowska
June	Wiesbaden International Championships; Wiesbaden, Weimar Republic	(Weimar Republic) Gottfried von Cramm; 6–4, 4–6, 4–6, 6–2, 6–2	(Monaco) René Gallepe	(France) Simonne Mathieu; 2–6, 6–1, 6–2	(Weimar Republic) Anne Peitz		
June	Wiesbaden International Championships; Wiesbaden, Weimar Republic					(Monaco) Gallepe/ (France) Mathieu; 6–2, 6–0	(Denmark) Worm/ (Weimar Republic) von Reznicek
June	Gelb-Weiss T.C. International Championships; Berlin, Weimar Republic	(Spain) Enrique Maier; 6–2, 6–0, 6–0	(Weimar Republic) Harry Schwenker	(Weimar Republic) Kallmeyer; 6–1, 6–4	(Weimar Republic) Nelly Neppach		
June	Gelb-Weiss T.C. International Championships; Berlin, Weimar Republic	(Weimar Republic) Frenz/Rahe; 6–3, 3–6, 10–8	(Weimar Republic) Hartz/Jänecke				
6–14 June	Tri-State Tennis Tournament; Cincinnati, United States	(United States) Cliff Sutter; 6–3, 6–3, 2–6, 6–3	(United States) Bruce Barnes	(United States) Clara Louise Zinke; 6–1. 6–1	(United States) Ruth Riese		
6–14 June	Tri-State Tennis Tournament; Cincinnati, United States	(United States) Barnes/Kamrath; 6–3, 6–0, 3–6, 6–2	(United States) Sutter/Bayon				
8–24 June	Singapore International Championships; Singapore, Straits Settlements	(Straits Settlements) Lim Bong Soo; 11–9, 6–0	(Empire of Japan) Shoyo Matsukawa				
12–18 June	Davis Cup Semifinals; Copenhagen, Denmark; Eastbourne, England	Semifinal winners Czechoslovakia 5–0; Great Britain 5–0	Semifinal losers Denmark; Japan				
12–18 June	Berlin International Championships; Berlin, Weimar Republic	(Czechoslovakia) Roderich Menzel; 6–4, 6–2, 6–1	(Weimar Republic) Daniel Prenn	(France) Ida Adamoff; 3–6, 6–0, 6–4	(Weimar Republic) Ilse Friedleben		
12–18 June	Berlin International Championships; Berlin, Weimar Republic	(Czechoslovakia) R. Menzel (Weimar Republic) Prenn; 6–1, 6–1, 7–5	(Weimar Republic) W. Menzel/Haensch	(Weimar Republic) Krahwinkel/Peitz; 6–4, 6–4	(Weimar Republic) Neppach (Poland) Jędrzejowska	(Weimar Republic) Cramm (France) Adamoff w/o	(France) Brugnon (France) Mathieu
−20 June	West Kensington tournament London, Great Britain	(United Kingdom) Harry Lee; 6–4, 4–6, 7–5	(Empire of Japan) Iwao Aoki				
June	White Sulphur Springs Championships; White Sulphur Springs, United States	(United States) Cliff Sutter; 7–5, 2–6, 6–1, 3–6, 6–4	(United States) George Lott	(United States) Marjorie Gladman Van Ryn; 3–6, 6–2, 6–l	(United States) Virginia Rice		
June	White Sulphur Springs Championships; White Sulphur Springs, United States	(United States) Van Ryn (United States) Lott; 6–3, 6–3, 6–2	(Canada) Rainville; Wright			(United States) Sutter; Rice; 6–4, 6–2	(United States) Van Ryn (United States) Van Ryn
June	Hungarian National Championships; Budapest, Hungary	(Hungary) Béla von Kehrling; 6–2, 6–4, 3–6, 6–1^{[a]}	(Hungary) Lehel Bánó	(Hungary) Magda Baumgarten; 6–2, 6–3	(Hungary) Jolán W. Soós		
June	Hungarian National Championships; Budapest, Hungary	(Hungary) Zichy/Gabrovitz; 7–5, 6–2, 6–1^{[a]}	(Hungary) Kirchmäyr/Krepuska	(Hungary) Baumgarten/Soós; 8–6, 6–3	(Hungary) Mrs. Schréder/Mrs. Brandenburg	(Hungary) Gabrovitz/Mrs. Gönczi; N/A	(Hungary) Jacobi/Mrs. Wiener
June	North Germany Pro Championships; Weimar Republic	(Weimar Republic) Hans Nüsslein; 6–4, 6–4, 3–6, 6–1	(Weimar Republic) Roman Najuch				
June	French Pro Championship; Paris, France; Singles	(France) Martin Plaa; 6–3, 6–1, 3–6, 6–2	(France) Robert Ramillon				
June	Pinehurst Country Club Championships; Pinehurst, United States	(United States) John Van Ryn; 7–5, 6–3, 6–1	(United States) Cliff Sutter	(United States) Marion Zinderstein Jessup; 7–5, 6–2	(United States) Marjorie Gladman Van Ryn		
June	Pinehurst Country Club Championships; Pinehurst, United States	(United States) Van Ryn (United States) Shields; 6–3, 9–7, 7–5	(Canada) Rainville/Wright			(United States) Van Ryn (United States) Van Ryn; 6–3, 3–6, 8–6	(United States) Sutter (United States) Rice
June	Kent Championships; Beckenham, Great Britain	(United Kingdom) Colin Gregory; 3–6, 6–3, 7–9, 6–3, 6–0	(United Kingdom) John Olliff	(United Kingdom) Phyllis Mudford; 6–1, 6–2	(United Kingdom) Dorothy Round		
June	Queen's Club Championships; London, Great Britain	(United Kingdom) John Olliff; 3–6, 6–4, 6–2	(United Kingdom) Edward Avory	(United Kingdom) Elsie Pittman; 4–6, 6–4, 6–l	(Weimar Republic) Hilde Krahwinkel		
June	Queen's Club Championships; London, Great Britain	(Weimar Republic) Cramm (France) Brugnon; 4–6, 6–4, 10–8, 4–6, 7–5	(Argentina) Boyd (Argentina) Zappa	(United States) Harper (United States) Van Ryn; 7–5, 6–4	(United Kingdom) Godfree; Stocks	(United Kingdom) Wheatley/Lyle; 6–2, 5–7, 6–3	(Weimar Republic) Cramm (Weimar Republic) Aussem
28 June	Laurels in Apawamis Invitational Tournament; United States			(United States) Dorothy Andrus; 6–4, 10–8	(United States) Maud Levi		

== July ==
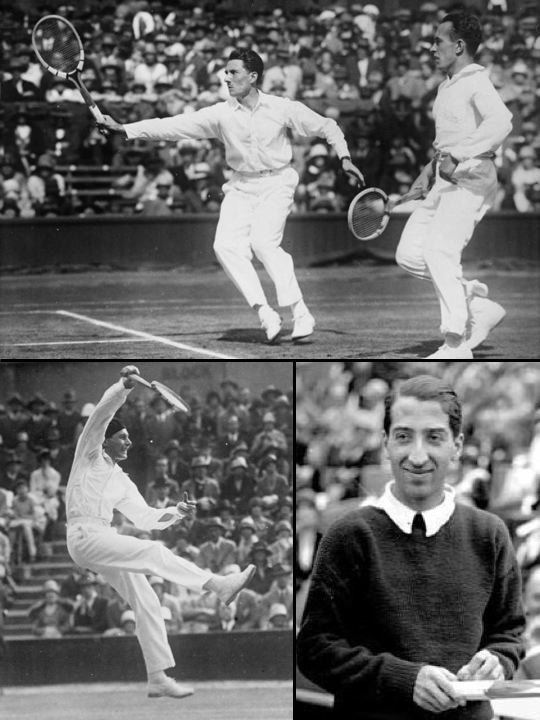
Jacques Brugnon, Henri Cochet (up), Jean Borotra (down-left) and René Lacoste (down-right), the defending and 1931 champion French Davis Cup team

- Hungary Davis Cup team permanent member between 1924 and 1931 and five time Hungarian Covered court champion (1924–29), Imre Takáts died.
- Jean Borotra was officially excluded from the doubles competition at Wimbledon.
- The Wimbledon Juniors' Championship was won by Charles Edgar Hare, while the girls' champion was Sheila Hewitt beating Kay Stammers.
- The English women players won all eight matches against the German women.
- Germany beat South Africa in a nine-rubber challenge allowing their opponents to win only one of them.
- Argentine beat Canada in a friendly national team competition.
- Several federal championships were held throughout the Weimar Republic. These include:
  - The Württemberg Championships in Stuttgart was won by Philipp Buss (singles, doubles with Oppenheimer) and Frau Hammer (singles, mixed with Lorentz), the Chemnitz's Championships won by Ludwig Haensch (singles, doubles with Bergmann) and Frau Deutsch, the South Germany Championships in Karlsruhe also by Haensch, Buss/Oppenheimer in doubles and Frau Friedleben in singles and paired with Buss in mixed, and in Düsseldorf Fritz Kuhlmann won over Remmert.
  - At the Rhine valley Championships in Duisburg Béla von Kehrling won a triple title.
  - In Warnemünde Kuhlmann was granted a walkover in the final, Friedrich Frenz won the doubles with Friedrich-Wilhelm Rahe and the mixed doubles with Frau Ewen.
  - In the Heringsdorf Championship Men's singles Henner Henkel scored the win when his opponents, Rau retired in the fourth set. They teamed up for the doubles but lost in the final match to Hans-Georg Lindenstaedt and Herr Bräuer. Nelly Neppach earned a clean victory losing one game in the final. The singles champions teamed up and successfully took the prize in the mixed event.
  - The Zoppot tournament champions were Heinz Pietzner, Frau Hammer and Friedrich Frenz/Friedrich-Wilhelm Rahe.
  - The Sudeten Germans beat the Austrian national team in Marienbad.
- French Davis Cup team beat Belgium in Le Touquet on a preparation match.
- Keith Gledhill defeated Ellsworth Vines in straight sets in the final of the Rhode Island state tennis championships.

Month	Event	Men		Women		Mixed	
Month	Event	Champions	Runner-up	Champions	Runner-up	Champions	Runner-up
22 June – 4 July	Wimbledon Championships; London, Great Britain; Men's singles – Women's singles	(United States) Sidney Wood w/o^{[i]}	(United States) Frank Shields	(Weimar Republic) Cilly Aussem; 6–2, 7–5	(Weimar Republic) Hilde Krahwinkel	All England Plate (South Africa) Vernon Kirby def. (Republic of Ireland) George Lyttleton-Rogers; 2–6, 6–3, 6–3	
22 June – 4 July	Wimbledon Championships; London, Great Britain; Men's singles – Women's singles	(United States) Lott (United States) Van Ryn; 6–2, 10–8, 9–11, 3–6, 6–3	(France) Cochet (France) Brugnon	(United Kingdom) Shepherd-Barron (United Kingdom) Mudford; 3–6, 6–3, 6–3	(France) Metaxa (Belgium) Sigart	(United States) Lott (United States) Harper; 6–3, 1–6, 6–1	(United Kingdom) Collins (United Kingdom) Ridley
–6 July	American National Clay Court Championship; St. Louis, United States	(United States) Ellsworth Vines; 6–3, 6–3, 6–3	(United States) Keith Gledhill				
–6 July	American National Clay Court Championship; St. Louis, United States	(United States) Vines (United States) Gledhill; 6–3, 7–9, 10–8, 9–7	(United States) Barnes (United States) Bell				
–6 July	US Pro Championships; New York, United States	(United States) Bill Tilden; 7–5, 6–2, 6–1	(United States) Vinnie Richards				
–6 July	US Pro Championships; New York, United States	(United States) Kinsey (United States) Richards; 7–9, 7–5, 3–6, 6–4, 6–3	(United States) Tilden (United States) Hunter				
July	Pro Championships of Great Britain; London, Great Britain	(United Kingdom) Dan Maskell; N/A	N/A				
July	Arrange L. T. C. Invitational Championships; United States	(United States) John Doeg; 6–1, 6–3, 6–2	(United States) Berkeley Bell				
July	Swiss Championships; Basel, Switzerland	(Switzerland) Hector Fisher; 7–5, 3–6, 6–1, 6–3	(Denmark) Erik Worm	Fehlmann; 6–1, 6–4	Charmelet		
July	Swiss Championships; Basel, Switzerland	(Switzerland) Aeschlimann/Fisher; 6–4, 6–2, 6–1	(Switzerland) Wuarin/Maneff			(Denmark) Worm/Weihe; 9–7, 7–5	(Switzerland) Fisher/Jacky
6–11 July	Northumberland Championships; Newcastle, Great Britain	(Socialist Federal Republic of Yugoslavia) Franjo Šefer; 7–5, 9–7, 1–6, 4–6, 6–2	(Socialist Federal Republic of Yugoslavia) Franjo Kukuljevic	(United Kingdom) Mary McIlquham; 7–5, 6–3	Stephens		
6–11 July	Northumberland Championships; Newcastle, Great Britain	(Socialist Federal Republic of Yugoslavia) Šefer/Kukuljevic; 6–2, 6–3	Watson/Brown	(United Kingdom) McIlquham/Mrs Stephens; 6–8, 6–3, 6–1	Alexander/Watson	(Socialist Federal Republic of Yugoslavia) Kukuljevic/ (United Kingdom) Watson; 6–2, 7–5	(Socialist Federal Republic of Yugoslavia) Šefer/ (United Kingdom) Alexander
5–15 July	Dutch Championships; Noordwijk, Netherlands	(Weimar Republic) Fritz Kuhlmann; 8–10, 6–2, 7–5, 6–2	(Empire of Japan) Minoru Kawachi	(France) Ida Adamoff; 6–2, 6–3	(Weimar Republic) Toni Schomburgk		
5–15 July	Dutch Championships; Noordwijk, Netherlands	(Empire of Japan) Kawachi/Sato; 6–1 ret.	(Weimar Republic) Kuhlmann/Haensch	(France) Henrotin/ (Belgium) Sigart; 6–4, 6–1	(Netherlands) Dros/ (Italy) Valerio	(Argentina) Zappa/ (France) Henrotin; 4–6, 6–4, 10–8	(Argentina) Boyd/ (Netherlands) Dros
9–11 July	Davis Cup Europe Zone Final; Prague, Czechoslovakia	Final winners Great Britain 4–1	Final losers Czechoslovakia				
13–18 July	Welsh Championships; Newport, Great Britain	(Empire of Japan) Sato; 6–4, 6–3, 6–1	(United Kingdom) David H. Williams	(United Kingdom) Emma Hemmant; 6–3, 5–7, 6–3	(United Kingdom) Jeanette Morfey		
13–18 July	Welsh Championships; Newport, Great Britain	(Empire of Japan) Sato/Takasu; 6–3, 10–8	(United Kingdom) Nuthall / Tuckett	(United Kingdom) Dyson/Hemmant; 7–5, 6–4	(United Kingdom) Mrs Crawshay-Williams/Morfey	(Switzerland) Payot/ (Empire of Japan) Sato/ (United Kingdom) Hemmant; 3–6, 6–2, 6–2	(United Kingdom) DH Williams/Dyson
13–18 July	Longwood Bowl Tournament; Longwood Cricket Club; Chestnut Hill, United States	(United States) Ellsworth Vines; 4–6, 6–3, 6–3, 3–6, 6–3	(United States) John Doeg	(United States) Dorothy Andrus; 6–2, 1–6, 6–4	(United States) Sarah Palfrey		
13–18 July	Longwood Bowl Tournament; Longwood Cricket Club; Chestnut Hill, United States	(United States) Vines (United States) Gledhill; 3–6, 6–1, 6–3, 6–1	(United States) Doeg (United States) Coen	(United States) Wills Moody / Wightman; 2–6, 6–4, 6–3	(United States) Palfrey (United States) Palfrey		
–18 July	Scottish Championships; Peebles, Scotland	(South Africa) Vernon Kirby; 6–2, 13–11	(South Africa) Norman Farquharson	(United Kingdom) Gwen Sterry; 7–5, 6–4	(Australia) Esna Boyd Robertson		
–18 July	Scottish Championships; Peebles, Scotland	(South Africa) Farquharson/Kirby; 6–3, 6–4, 13–11	(United Kingdom) Sharpe/Olliff	(United Kingdom) Sterry/Trentham; 6–3, 6–4	(United Kingdom) Mason/Alexander	(South Africa) Farquharson/ (United Kingdom) Sterry; 4–6, 6–1, 6–4	(South Africa) Raymond/ (United Kingdom) Watson
17–19 July	Davis Cup Inter-Zonal Zone Final; Paris, France	Final winners Great Britain 3–2	Final losers United States				
20–25 July	Irish Championships; Dublin, Ireland	(Republic of Ireland) Edward McGuire; 6–2, 6–2, 6–3	(Republic of Ireland) Harry Cronin	(Republic of Ireland) Rosetta Phoebe Blair-White; 6–4, 6–3	(Republic of Ireland) Norma Stoker		
20–25 July	Irish Championships; Dublin, Ireland	(Republic of Ireland) McGuire/Scroope; 6–4, 6–4, 6–3	(Republic of Ireland) McVeagh/Smith				
24–26 July	Davis Cup Challenge Round Final; Paris, France	France (c) 3–2	Great Britain				
21–26 July	Grand Hotel Panhans Championships; Semmering, Austria	(Empire of Japan) Minoru Kawachi; 6–4, 6–3, 6–2	(Czechoslovakia) Josef Siba	(Weimar Republic) Imrgard Rost; 6–3, 8–6	(Italy) Lucia Valerio		
21–26 July	Grand Hotel Panhans Championships; Semmering, Austria	(Argentina) del Castillo/ (Spain) Maier; 3–6, 6–3, 6–2, 7–9, 6–3	(Czechoslovakia) Rohrer/Gottlieb			(Empire of Japan) Sato (Italy) Valerio; 6–4, 6–3	(Spain) Maier/ (Weimar Republic) Rost
July	Bavarian International Championships; Munich, Weimar Republic	(Empire of Japan) Hyotaro Sato; 7–5, 4–6, 7–5, 6–1	(Spain) Enrique Maier	(Italy) Lucia Valerio; 6–2, 7–5	(Weimar Republic) Marie Horn		
July	Bavarian International Championships; Munich, Weimar Republic	(Weimar Republic) L. Lorenz/Daller; 4–6, 6–4, 6–1, 3–6, 8–6	(Empire of Japan) Sato/Kawachi			(Spain) Enrique Maier (Italy) Valerio; 6–4, 5–7, 6–2	(Weimar Republic) Kuhlmann/v. Ende
July	Strasbourg International Championships; Strasbourg, France	(France) Paul Féret; 6–1, 6–1	(France) Jean Lesueur	(Weimar Republic) Ilse Friedleben; 6–2, 6–2	Holzschuh		
July	Strasbourg International Championships; Strasbourg, France	(France) Brugnon/Féret; 4–6, 6–3, 6–2	(Egypt) Grandguillot/Grandguillot			(Weimar Republic) Buss/Friedleben; 6–1, 5–7, 6–4	(Weimar Republic) Kuhlmann/ (Egypt) Grandguillot/Meunier
July	Midlands International Championships; Edgbaston, Great Britain	(Empire of Japan) Jiro Sato; 7–5, 6–4	(United Kingdom) Herman David	(Switzerland) Lolette Payot; 6–4, 4–6, 6–4	(United Kingdom) Mary Heeley		
July	Midlands International Championships; Edgbaston, Great Britain	(United Kingdom) Lester/Olliff; 6–4, 6–2, 8–10, 2–6, 6–3	(Empire of Japan) Sato/Miki			(Empire of Japan) Sato/ (United Kingdom) James; 6–3, 7–5	(France) Gentien/ (Switzerland) Payot
July	East of England Championships; Felixstowe, Great Britain	(Austria) Franz Wilhelm Matejka; 6–2, 6–3	(Republic of Ireland) Simon Scroope	(United Kingdom) Elsie Pittman; 6–2, 6–2	(United Kingdom) Joan Ridley		
July	East of England Championships; Felixstowe, Great Britain	(Republic of Ireland) Scroope/ (United Kingdom) Crole-Rees; 5–7, 6–2, 6–2, 6–3	(Austria) Matejka/ (United Kingdom) Wilde				

== August ==
Month	Event	Men		Women		Mixed	
Month	Event	Champions	Runner-up	Champions	Runner-up	Champions	Runner-up
27 July−1 August	Seabright Invitational Women's tournament New Jersey, United States	(United States) Ellsworth Vines; 10–12, 6–3, 6–8, 8–6, 6–1	(United States) John Doeg	(United States) Helen Wills Moody; 6–0, 6–0	(United States) Helen Jacobs		
27 July−1 August	Seabright Invitational Women's tournament New Jersey, United States	(United States) Allison / (United States) Van Ryn; 7–5, 6–2, 6–4	(United States) Bell / (United States) Mangin	(United States) Cruickshank / (United States) Van Ryn; 9–7, 0–6, 6–4	(United States) Levi / (United States) Harper	(United States) Van Ryn / (United States) Van Ryn; 6–3, 6–4	(United States) Cruickshank / (United States) Vines
-3 August	Canadian National Championships; Vancouver, British Columbia, Canada	(Canada) Jack Wright; 6–3, 6–4, 6–2	(Canada) Gilbert Nunns	(United States) Edith Cross; 6–2, 6–2	(Canada) Marjory Leeming		
-3 August	Canadian National Championships; Vancouver, British Columbia, Canada	(Canada) Wright / (Canada) Rainville; 7–5, 9–7, 7–5	(United States) Prusoff / (United States) Driscoll	(United States) Cross / (United States) Perow; 6–2, 6–0		(United States) Driscoll / (United States) Cross; 6–3, 1–6, 6–1	(United States) Perow / Nordstrom
8–16 August	Eastern Grass Court Championship; Westchester Country Club; Rye, United States	(United Kingdom) Fred Perry; 6–2, 6–2, 6–4	(United States) Gilbert Hall	(United Kingdom) Elsie Goldsack Pittman; 6–3, 4–6 unfinished	(United Kingdom) Joan Ridley		
8–16 August	Eastern Grass Court Championship; Westchester Country Club; Rye, United States	(United States) Vines / Gledhill; 4–6, 6–3, 6–3, 11–9	(United States) Lott/Ryn	(United Kingdom) Pittman/ (United Kingdom) Ridley; 13–11, 4–6, 6–3	(United States) Van Ryn / Cruickshank		
2–August	Maidstone's Women's Invitation Tournament; Maidstone Club; East Hampton, NY, United States			(United States) Marjorie Gladman Van Ryn; 6–2, 6–4	(United States) Dorothy Shepherd-Barron		
2–August	Maidstone's Women's Invitation Tournament; Maidstone Club; East Hampton, NY, United States			(United Kingdom) Nuthall / (United Kingdom) Mudford; 5–7, 7–5, 6–2	(United States) Round / Whittingstall		
2–9 August	German Championships; Hamburg, Weimar Republic	(Czechoslovakia) Roderich Menzel^{[b]} 6–2, 6–2, 6–1	(Weimar Republic) Gustav Jaenecke^{[b]}	(Weimar Republic) Cilly Aussem; 6–1, 6–2	(Weimar Republic) Imrgard Rost		
2–9 August	German Championships; Hamburg, Weimar Republic	(Weimar Republic) Dessart / Nourney; 6–3, 6–3, 5–7, 4–6, 6–0	(France) Buzelet / Boussus	(United Kingdom) Godfree/Trentham; 6–3, 6–2	(United Kingdom) James / Heeley	(Switzerland) Payot / (Switzerland) Fisher; 8–6, 6–4	(Weimar Republic) Dessart / Krahwinkel
3–8 August	Southampton Invitation Tournament; Southampton, NY, United States	(United States) George Lott; 6–3, 3–6, 2–6, 6–3, 6–1	(United States) Clifford Sutter				
3–8 August	Southampton Invitation Tournament; Southampton, NY, United States	(United States) Vines / (United States) Gledhill; 17–15, 6–2, 6–4	(United States) Bell / Mangin			(United States) Weeks / (United States) Vines; 7–5, 5–7, 7–5	(United States) Taubele / McCauliff
27 July – 4 August	Le Touquet Spa Championships; Le Touquet, France	(France) Marcel Bernard; 8–6, 6–2, 6–4	(France) Christian Boussus	(France) Simonne Mathieu; 6–3, 6–4	(Italy) Lucia Valerio		
27 July – 4 August	Le Touquet Spa Championships; Le Touquet, France	(France) Bernard / Cochet; 6–4, 6–4, 7–5	(Republic of Ireland) Rogers / (Argentina) del Castillo	(United States) Ryan / (France) Mathieu w/o	(Italy) Valerio / (France) Adamoff	(France) Bernard / Mathieu; 6–4, 8–6	(France) Legeay/Ms. Lesueur
30 July – 8 August	Malayan Lawn Tennis Championships; Kuala Lumpur, Federated Malay States	(Straits Settlements) Lim Bong Soo; N/A	N/A	(United Kingdom) Elizabeth Millicent Oldfield; N/A	N/A		
30 July – 8 August	Malayan Lawn Tennis Championships; Kuala Lumpur, Federated Malay States	(Empire of Japan) Matsukawa/Kawajiri; N/A	N/A	(United Kingdom) Oldfield/Mrs. Drew	N/A		
7–8 August	Wightman Cup; Forest Hills, United States			United States 5–2	(United Kingdom) Great Britain		
8–16 August	Spanish International Championships; Santander, Spain	(France) Jean Lesueur; 6–3, 6–3 6–4	(Spain) Eduardo Flaquer	Bella Pons; N/A	N/A		
8–16 August	Spanish International Championships; Santander, Spain	(France) Lesueur / Combemale; N/A	(Spain) Flaquer / Sindreu	(Spain) Pons / Estrada; 7–5, 0–6, 7–5	(Spain) Teresa/Guadalupa	(Spain) Flaquer / Pons; 7–5, 6–4	(France) Lesueur / (Spain) Acebo
17–22 August	North England Championships; Scarborough, Great Britain	(South Africa) Vernon Kirby; 6–3, 6–3	Chamberlain	(United Kingdom) Mary Heeley; 2–6, 6–1, 6–2	(United Kingdom) Freda James		
17–22 August	North England Championships; Scarborough, Great Britain	(New Zealand) Malfroy / (South Africa) Kirby; 6–1, 6–1, 5–7, 6–4	(United Kingdom) Avory/Nuthall				
24–30 August	Swedish Championships; Stockholm, Sweden	(Sweden) Harry Ramberg; 1—6, 7–5, 6–3, 6—2	(Sweden) Curt Östberg	(Sweden) S. Fick; 6—1, 6—2	(Sweden) E. Cederholm		
24–30 August	Swedish Championships; Stockholm, Sweden	(Sweden) Östberg / Ramberg; 6—1, 6–2, 9—7	(Sweden) G. Lindgren / C. E. Pettersson	(Sweden) Fick / S. Wennerholm; 6—2, 6—2	(Sweden) R. Ramberg / G. Roberg	(Sweden) Östberg / S. Fick; 6—4, 6—0	(Sweden) Ramberg / Ramberg
August	Newport Casino Invitational; Newport, United States	(United States) Ellsworth Vines; 6–2, 6–4, 6–8, 6–2	(United Kingdom) Fred Perry				
August	Newport Casino Invitational; Newport, United States	(United States) Gledhill/Vines; 3–6, 6–3, 5–7, 13–11, 6–4	(United States) Doeg/Lott				
August	15th ATA All-Black National Championships; Alabama, United States	(United States) Reginald Weir; 6–1, 6–4, 3–6, 4–6, 8–6	(United States) Douglas Turner	(United States) Ora Washington; 6–3, 6–3	(United States) Blanche Winston		
August	15th ATA All-Black National Championships; Alabama, United States	(United States) F. Jackson / (United States) Jackson; 6–2, 3–6, 6–4, 3–6, 6–4	(United States) Wier / (United States) Norman	(United States) Winston / (United States) Washington; 6–2, 6–4	(United States) Demery / (United States) Hill	(United States) Thompson / (United States) Roberts; 6–3, 6–1	(United States) Moss / (United States) Stallworth

== September ==
- Béla von Kehrling won his 27th title of the year at the Oradean Championships.
- The U.S. Junior Championships was won by Jack Lynch against Jay Cohn
- An international team event between France, Great Britain and the United States was held at the Germantown Cricket Club in Philadelphia from 2–4 September. The final score was Great Britain (4 wins), United States (3 wins) and France (2 wins).

Week	Event	Men		Women		Mixed	
Week	Event	Champions	Runner-up	Champions	Runner-up	Champions	Runner-up
15 Aug; 12 Sep	US National Championships; Forest Hills, United States	(United States) Ellsworth Vines; 7–9, 6–3, 9–7, 7–5	(United States) George Lott^{[c]}	(United States) Helen Wills Moody^{[c]} 6–4, 6–1	(United Kingdom) Eileen Bennett Whittingstall		
15 Aug; 12 Sep	US National Championships; Forest Hills, United States	(United States) Allison / Van Ryn^{[c]} 6–4, 8–6, 6–3	(United States) Bell / Mangin	(United Kingdom) Nuthall / Whittingstall^{[c]} 6–2, 6–4	(United Kingdom) Round / (United States) Jacobs	(United States) Lott / (United Kingdom) Nuthall^{[c]} 6–3, 6–3	(United States) Allison / Harper
-5 Sep-	City of Sydney Championships; Sydney, Australia	(Australia) Jack Crawford; 6–3, 6–1, 6–3	(Australia) Aubrey Willard				
-5 Sep-	City of Sydney Championships; Sydney, Australia	(Australia) Hopman / (Australia) Crawford; 1–6, 6–3, 7–5, 6–2	(Australia) Dunlop / Donohoe			(Australia) Crawford / Crawford; N/A	N/A
18–28 Sep	Pacific Southwest Championships; Los Angeles, United States	(United States) Ellsworth Vines; 8–10, 6–3, 4–6, 7–5, 6–2	(United Kingdom) Fred Perry	(United States) Anna Harper; 3–6, 6–3, 6–4	(United States) Josephine Cruickshank		
18–28 Sep	Pacific Southwest Championships; Los Angeles, United States	(United States) Gledhill (United States) Vines; 6–4, 6–3, 7–5	(United States) Van Ryn (United States) Allison	(United States) Anna Harper; Cross; 6–2, 4–6, 6–4	(United States) Cruickshank (United States) Van Ryn	(United States) Allison / Cross; 7–5, 2–6, 7–5	(United States) Van Ryn (United States) Anna Harper
2–11 Sep	Hungarian International Championships; Budapest, Hungary	(Hungary) Béla von Kehrling; 6–3, 6–2, 5–7, 6–2	(Empire of Japan) Hyotaro Sato	(Weimar Republic) Klara Hammer; 3–6, 6–3, 9–7	(Poland) Jadwiga Jędrzejowska		
2–11 Sep	Hungarian International Championships; Budapest, Hungary	(Hungary) Zichy / Gabrovitz; 11–13, 6–3, 6–2, 1–6, 7–5	(Hungary) Kehrling / (Socialist Federal Republic of Yugoslavia) Šefer	(Poland) Jędrzejowska / (Austria) Eisenmenger; 6–3, 6–3	(Hungary) Mrs. Deutsch/Mrs. Csont	(Hungary) Zichy / (Romania) Zizovits w/o	(Hungary) Kehrling/Mrs. Deutch
Sep	Polish International Championships; Warsaw, Poland	(France) Benny Berthet; 5 sets	(Poland) Ignacy Tłoczyński	(Poland) Jadwiga Jędrzejowska; 6–0, 6–1	(Hungary) Mrs. Deutsch		
Sep	Polish International Championships; Warsaw, Poland	(Poland) M. Stolarow / J. Stolarow; N/A	(Austria) Brosch / Eifermann	(France) Berthet/ (Hungary) Mrs. Deutsch; N/A	N/A	(France) Berthet/Berthet; 3 sets	(Poland) Tłoczyński / Jędrzejowska
Sep	Dutch National Championships; Hilversum, Netherlands	(Netherlands) Jan van der Heide; N/A	N/A	(Netherlands) Els Belzer; 2 sets	(Netherlands) Margaretha Dros-Canters		
Sep	Dutch National Championships; Hilversum, Netherlands	(Netherlands) Koopman / Knottenbelt; N/A	N/A	(Netherlands) Soquiere/Bonimij; N/A	N/A	(Netherlands) Knottenbelt / Belzer; N/A	N/A
Sep	German Pro Championships; Berlin, Weimar Republic	(Weimar Republic) Hans Nüsslein; 6–1, 6–4, 6–3	(Weimar Republic) Roman Najuch				
Sep	German Pro Championships; Berlin, Weimar Republic	(France) Ramillon / Plaa; 3–6, 6–1, 6–0, 6–2	(Weimar Republic) Najuch/H. Bartel				
Sep	Meadow Club Invitational Championships; Forest Hills, United States	(United States) George Lott; 6–3, 3–6, 2–6, 6–3, 6–1	(United States) Cliff Sutter				
Sep	Meadow Club Invitational Championships; Forest Hills, United States	(United States) Gledhill / Vines; 17–15, 6–2, 6–4	(United States) Bell / Mangin			(United States) Vines/Weeks; 7–5, 5–7, 7–5	(United States) McCauliff / Taubele
Sep	North American Championships; Harrison, United States	(United Kingdom) Fred Perry; 6–3, 6–2, 6–4	(United States) Gilbert Hall	(United Kingdom) Elsie Pittman vs. (United Kingdom) Joan Ridley; 3–6, 6–4 suspended			
Sep	North American Championships; Harrison, United States	(United States) Gledhill / Vines; 4–6, 6–3, 6–3	(United States) Van Ryn / Lott				
Sep	Bad Homburg Championships; Bad Homburg, Weimar Republic	(Czechoslovakia) Roderich Menzel; 6–1, 6–1, 4–6, 6–0	(Weimar Republic) Fritz Kuhlmann	(Weimar Republic) Anne Peitz	(Weimar Republic) Marie Horn; 6–3, 7–5		
Sep	Bad Homburg Championships; Bad Homburg, Weimar Republic	(Weimar Republic) Buss/Oppenheimer; 9–11, 6–2, 6–3, 6–1	(Czechoslovakia) Menzel/W. Menzel			Fuchs/Fischer vs. Menzel/Mrs. Menzel; No contest^{[d]}	
Sep	Livorno International Championships; Livorno, Italy	(France) Jacques Bonte; 8–6, 6–2, 0–6, 1–6, 6–3	(Italy) Oscar De Minerbi	(Italy) Manzutto; 6–0, 6–4	(Italy) Orlandini		
Sep	Livorno International Championships; Livorno, Italy	(France) Bonte / (France) Glasser; 6–2, 6–3, 6–4	(Italy) Minerbi / Serventi			(Italy) de Stefani/Manzutto; 6–2, 6–3	(Italy) Supino/Orlandini
Sep	Luzern International Championships; Lucerne, Switzerland	(Italy) Emanuele Sertorio sets: 1–1, suspended	(United Kingdom) John Olliff	(France) Simone Barbier; 1–6, 8–6, 6–2	(Switzerland) Lolette Payot		
Sep	Luzern International Championships; Lucerne, Switzerland	(United Kingdom) Olliff / Lesueur; 8–6, 6–1, 1–6, 6–3	(France) Glasser / (Denmark) Worm			(France) Glasser / (Switzerland) Payot; 6–0, 6–2	(Egypt) Grandguillot / (France) Barbier
Sep	Swiss International Championships; Geneve, Switzerland	(France) Georges Glasser w/o	(France) Antoine Gentien	(Switzerland) Lolette Payot; 7–5, 3–6, 6–3	(Weimar Republic) Ilse Friedleben		
Sep	Polish National Championships; Lemberg, Poland	(Poland) Ignacy Tłoczyński; 6–4, 4–6, 6–1, 6–4	(Poland) Maximilian Stolarow	(Poland) Jadwiga Jędrzejowska; 6–2, 6–1	(Poland) Gertruda Volkmer		
Sep	Polish National Championships; Lemberg, Poland	(Poland) M. Stolarow / J. Stolarow; 7–5, 1–6, 6–3, 7–5	(Poland) Horain / Wittmann	(Poland) Dubieńska / Jędrzejowska; 6–2, 6–2	(Poland) Volkmer/Rudowska	(Poland) Popławski/Volkmer; 7–5, 6–1	(Poland) Tłoczyński / Dubieńska
14–20 Sep	Swiss Championships; Montreux, Switzerland	(Italy) Giorgio de Stefani; 6–1, 6–2, 6–3	(Italy) Emanuele Sertorio	(Switzerland) Lolette Payot; 6–4, 5–7, 6–3	(Italy) Lucia Valerio		
14–20 Sep	Swiss Championships; Montreux, Switzerland	(France) Martin-Legeay / Gajan; 2–6, 6–3, 6–1, 6–3	(Switzerland) Aeschlimann / Fisher	(France) Barbier / Payot; 6–3, 6–4	(Belgium) Sigart / (Italy) Valerio	(Switzerland) Fisher / Payot; 8–6, 3–6, 6–3	(Switzerland) Aeschlimann / (Belgium) Sigart
Sep	Oradean Championships; Oradea, Romania	(Hungary) Béla von Kehrling; 6–4, 6–4, 7–5	(Hungary) Bánó	(Hungary) Mrs. Schréder; 3–6, 7–5, 8–6	(Poland) Gertruda Volkmer		
Sep	Oradean Championships; Oradea, Romania	(Hungary) Zichy / Kehrling; 3–6, 6–0, 6–2, 6–2	(Poland) Popławski/Stolarow			(Poland) Stolarow/Volkmer; 3–6, 6–4, 6–4	(Hungary) Bánó/Mrs. Schréder

== October ==
- Former US top 10 player Frederic Mercur was reinstated by the USLTA and was allowed to play as of 1 October.
- Bruce Barnes turned professional and signed with the Tilden Tennis Tours.

Week	Event	Men		Women		Mixed	
Week	Event	Champions	Runner-up	Champions	Runner-up	Champions	Runner-up
-4 Oct	Pacific Coast Championships; San Francisco, United States (Men); Berkeley, United States (Women)	(United States) Ellsworth Vines; 6–3, 21–19, 6–0?^{[g]} 6–3, 2–6, 11–9, 6–3?^{[h]}	(United Kingdom) Fred Perry	(United States) Edith Cross; 6–4, 2–6, 7–5	(United States) Dorothy Weisel		
-4 Oct	Pacific Coast Championships; San Francisco, United States (Men); Berkeley, United States (Women)	(United States) Wood/Stoeffen; 6–4, 7–5, 6–3?^{h} 6–4, 6–4, 6–3?^{g}	(United Kingdom) Perry/Hughes			(United States) Lott/ Moody; 6–3, 3–6, 6–0	(United States) Hughes/Cross
-5 Oct	Coupe Porée; Paris, France	(France) Paul Féret; 6–3, 6–1, 2–6, 4–6, 6–4	(France) André Merlin	(France) Simon Mathieu; 4–6, 6–4, 6–4	(Belgium) Josane Sigart		
-5 Oct	Coupe Porée; Paris, France	(France) Borotra/Brugnon; 1–6, 5–7, 6–4, 6–1, 6–3	(France) Bernard / (Spain) Maier	(France) Metaxa / (Belgium) Sigart; 1–6, 6–4, 6–1.	(France) Adamoff / (France) Claude-Anet	(France) Borotra / (Belgium) Sigart; 6–2, 4–6, 9–7	(Switzerland) Fisher / (Switzerland) Payot
1 Oct-	Tatra International Tournament; Rimavská Sobota, Czechoslovakia	(Czechoslovakia) Roderich Menzel; 6–3, 6–1, 6–1	(Austria) Franz Wilhelm Matejka				
1 Oct-	Tatra International Tournament; Rimavská Sobota, Czechoslovakia	(Czechoslovakia) Menzel/Klein retired^{[f]}	(Austria) Matejka/ (Hungary) Zichy			(Czechoslovakia) Blabol, Mrs. Weidenhoffer w/o^{[f]}	(Poland) Wittmann/Jędrzejowska
9 Oct-	Baltimore Hotel Invitational Tournament; Santa Barbara, United States	(United States) Keith Gledhill; 3–6, 6–1, 6–0	(United States) Ellsworth Vines	(United States) Marjorie Gladman Van Ryn; 2–6, 6–4, 6–4	(United States) Josephine Cruickshank		
9 Oct-	Baltimore Hotel Invitational Tournament; Santa Barbara, United States	(United States) Stoefen / (United States) Tidball; 6–3, 6–3	(United States) Neer / Stradford			(United States) Babcock / Culley; 6–3, 6–3	Bartosh / Robbins
-22 Oct	Chinese National Championships; Shanghai, China	(Straits Settlements) Lim Bong Soo; 6–3, 5–7, 5–7, 6–4, 6–4	(Republic of China (1912–1949)) Khoo Hooi Hye				
-22 Oct	Chinese National Championships; Shanghai, China	(Straits Settlements) Soo/Yong cancelled	(Republic of China (1912–1949)) Khoo/Kong				
Oct	Merano Championships; Merano, Italy	(Czechoslovakia) Roderich Menzel; 6–2, 6–1, 6–0	(Weimar Republic) Ludwig Haensch	(Weimar Republic) Hilde Krahwinkel; 3 points to 2^{[e]}	(Switzerland) Lolette Payot		
Oct	Merano Championships; Merano, Italy	(Switzerland) Fisher/ (France) Lesueur; 6–3, 6–2, 1–6, 6–3	(France) Glasser/ (France) du Plaix	(Weimar Republic) Krahwinkel/Friedleben; N/A	(Weimar Republic) Reznicek/ (Weimar Republic) Horn	(Switzerland) Fisher/Payot w/o	(France) Glasser/ (United Kingdom) Dyson
28 Sep – 3 Oct	West of England Championships; London, Great Britain	(Empire of Japan) Jiro Sato; 6–3, 6–4	(United Kingdom) David H. Williams	(United Kingdom) Phyllis Mudford; 7–5, 2–6, 6–3	(United Kingdom) Dorothy Round		
28 Sep – 3 Oct	West of England Championships; London, Great Britain	(Empire of Japan) Sato/Miki; 7–5, 5–7, 7–5	(United Kingdom) Avory/ (South Africa) Spence	(United Kingdom) Nuthall/Whittingstall; 6–4, 6–3	(United Kingdom) Mudford/Round	(Empire of Japan) Miki/ (United Kingdom) Round; 2–6, 6–1, 6–4	(United Kingdom) Avory/Mudford
5–10 Oct	West Hants Club Championships; Bournemouth, Great Britain	(United Kingdom) Jack Lysaght; 6–3, 6–3	(Republic of Ireland) Cecil Campbell	(United Kingdom) Kathleen Godfree; 6–4, 6–4	(United Kingdom) Nancy Lyle		
12–20 Oct	British Covered Court Championships; London, Great Britain	(France) Jean Borotra; 10–8, 6–3, 0–6, 6–3	(Empire of Japan) Jiro Sato	(United Kingdom) Mary Heeley; 6–1, 6–0	(United Kingdom) Jeanette Morfey		
Oct	Villa d'Este Championships; Villa d'Este, Italy	(France) Georges Glasser; 0–6, 6–4, 6–3, 6–3	(Italy) Emanuele Sertorio	(Italy) Lucia Valerio; 8–6, 6–1	(Belgium) Josane Sigart		
Oct	Villa d'Este Championships; Villa d'Este, Italy	(France) Glasser/ (Austria) Salm-Hoogstraten; 6–2, 6–2, 6–1	(Weimar Republic) Kleinschroth/ (United Kingdom) Hillyard	(Belgium) Sigart/ (Italy) Valerio; 6–1, 6–2	(United Kingdom) Dyson/Hemmant	(Weimar Republic) Kleischrott/ (Italy) Valerio; 6–4, 4–6, 6–4	(United Kingdom) Hillyard/Satterthwaite
Oct	Cumberland Club Alvanley Garden Championship; Hampstead, England	(Empire of Japan) Jiro Sato; 6–4, 6–3	(United Kingdom) Edward Avory				
Oct	Cumberland Club Alvanley Garden Championship; Hampstead, England	(Empire of Japan) Sato/Miki; 6–4, 6–2, 6–2	(United Kingdom) Ritchie/Avory			(Empire of Japan) Sato/ (United Kingdom) Ingram; 6–1, 8–6	(United Kingdom) Avory/Ms. Scott

== November ==
- Jack Crawford was granted the Queensland Cup after winning the Queensland Championships for the third time.
- Active Mexican Davis Cup member and second ranked national tennis player Manuel Llano died.

Month	Event	Men		Women		Mixed	
Month	Event	Champions	Runner-up	Champions	Runner-up	Champions	Runner-up
-23 November	Argentine International II. Buenos Aires, Argentine			(Weimar Republic) Cilly Aussem; 6–1, 6–4	(Weimar Republic) Irmgard Rost		
-23 November	Argentine International II. Buenos Aires, Argentine					(Argentina) Boyd/ (Weimar Republic) Aussem; N/A	N/A
November	Sport Club Italia Championships; Milan, Italy	(Italy) Stefano Mangold; 7–5, 6–4, 6–4	(Italy) Placido Gaslini				
November	Sport Club Italia Championships; Milan, Italy	(Italy) Martino/Gaslini; 6–4, 5–7, 6–2, 6–2	(Italy) Bonzi/Rado				
November	Bolzano International Championships; Bolzano, Italy	(Austria) Heinrich Eifermann; 5–7, 6–4, 7–5, 6–1	(Italy) Ferruccio Quintavalle	(Weimar Republic) Paula von Reznicek; 6–3, 2–6, 6–4	(Italy) Elisabetta Riboli		
November	Queensland Championships; Queensland, Australia	(Australia) Jack Crawford; 6–3, 6–4, 7–5	(Australia) Harry Hopman				
November	Queensland Championships; Queensland, Australia	(Australia) Edgar Moon/ (Australia) Crawford; 2–6, 6–4, 6–2, 3–6, 6–3	(Australia) Hopman/Willard				

== December ==
- 1912 US Open contestant Harold Braley was killed in a car.
- After winning two titles and an exhibition in Buenos Aires Cilly Aussem had to cut off her South American tour and return to Germany because of a liver infection.
- John Lim gave up the S.C.R.C. final because of a blistered finger.
- In December, the professional players living in Germany, France, Britain, Austria, the Netherlands and Switzerland formed the "Fédération internationale des Professeurs et Professionels" to represent their interest against the ITF. Roman Najuch was elected its president.

Month	Event	Men		Women		Mixed	
Month	Event	Champions	Runner-up	Champions	Runner-up	Champions	Runner-up
5 December	Chile International Championships; Santiago, Chile			(Weimar Republic) Cilly Aussem; 8–6, 6–2	(Weimar Republic) Irmgard Rost		
13 December	Victorian Championships; Melbourne, Australia	(Australia) Jack Crawford; 7–5, 0–6, 6–3, 6–4	(Australia) Harry Hopman	(United Kingdom) Esna Boyd-Robertson; 6–1, 6–1	(Australia) Kathleen Le Messurier		
13 December	Victorian Championships; Melbourne, Australia	(Australia) Patterson / Hopman; 2–6, 7–5, 8–6, 6–2	(Australia) Quist / Turnbull	O'Hara Wood / Toyne; 2–6, 8–6, 8–6	(Australia) Le Mesurier / Hoddle-Wrigley	(Australia) Crawford/Crawford; 8–6, 6–8, 6–4	(Australia) Hopman/ (Australia) Eleanor Mary Hall
29 November – 15 December	Catalonia Championships; Barcelona, Spain	(Spain) Enrique Maier; 6–4, 6–8, 6–3	(Spain) Antonio Juanico	(Spain) Yolanda Chailly; 6–1, 6–0	(Spain) Rosa Torras		
29 November – 15 December	Catalonia Championships; Barcelona, Spain	(Spain) Maier/Sindreu; 13–11, 6–4, 6–4	(Spain) Flaquer/Saprissa	(Spain) Pons/Torras; 6–3, 6–2	(Spain) Herberg/Fontrodona	(Spain) Maier/Torras; 8–6, 7–5	(Spain) Flaquer/Pons
−18 December	Straits Chinese Recreation Club Championships; Singapore, Straits Settlements	(Straits Settlements) Chua Choon Leong	John Lim; 6–4, 6–8, 4–0 ret.				

== Tilden Tennis Tours ==
Pro tour events in a Tilden-Kozeluh retrospective
Date	Location (Europe)	Tilden	Koželuh
21–22 October	Paris (France)	6–3, 6–2, 7–5	
24–25 October	Brussels (Belgium)	6–4, 11–9	
24–25 October	Amsterdam (Netherlands)		9–7, 6–1
27–28 October	Hamburg (Weimar)	8–6, 10–8, 1–6, 6–3	
	Cologne (Weimar)	(with Hunter) 8–6, 6–2	(with Burke)
30 October – 1 November	Berlin (Weimar)	6–4, 3–6, 8–6	
9 November	Paris II. (France)	no head-to-head	no head-to-head

Pro tour events in a Tilden-Kozeluh retrospective
Date	Location (USA)	Tilden	Koželuh
18 February – 5 May	Los Angeles	3–6, 6–4, 8–10, 6–2, 6–3	
18 February – 5 May	Los Angeles (LATC)		4–6, 6–2, 3–6, 6–4, 6–l
18 February – 5 May	Los Angeles II. (LATC)		6–4, 6–4, 6–1
18 February – 5 May	Alhambra	4–6, 8–6, 6–3	
18 February – 5 May	San Diego	6–3, 9–7	
18 February – 5 May	San Francisco	7–5, 6–3, 3–6, 6–3	
18 February – 5 May	Berkeley		4–6, 6–3, 7–5, 6–2
18 February – 5 May	Los Angeles III. (LATC)		7–5, 10–8
18 February – 5 May	Long Beach	6–3, 6–2	
18 February – 5 May	Huntingdon		10–8, 8–6
18 February – 5 May	San Francisco II.	6–4, 6–0, 6–3	
18 February – 5 May	Denver	7–5, 6–4, 14–12	
18 February – 5 May	Lincoln	6–4, 6–2, 6–3	
18 February – 5 May	Madison	6–3, 6–3, 7–5	
18 February – 5 May	Minneapolis	10–8, 3–6, 4–6, 6–1, 6–3	
18 February – 5 May	St. Louis	6–3, 6–3, 6–4	
18 February – 5 May	Dayton	7–5, 6–3	
18 February – 5 May	Cleveland	8–6, 6–3, 6–2	
18 February – 5 May	Buffalo	8–6, 6–3. 6–4	
18 February – 5 May	Rochester	6–3, 6–3	
18 February – 5 May	Rochester II.	6–3, 6–3	
18 February – 5 May	Albany	6–4, 6–4, 7–5	
18 February – 5 May	New Haven		1–6, 6–2, 6–2, 6–3
18 February – 5 May	Toronto	6–2, 6–4, 6–2	
18 February – 5 May	Montreal	6–1, 6–3, 6–2	

== Unknown date ==
Event	Men		Women		Mixed	
Event	Champions	Runner-up	Champions	Runner-up	Champions	Runner-up
Finnish Championships; Helsinki, Finland	(Finland) Bo Grotenfelt; N/A	N/A	(Weimar Republic) Hilde Krahwinkel; N/A	N/A		
Finnish Championships; Helsinki, Finland	(Finland) Bo Grotenfelt/ (Estonia) Conni Kupsch; N/A	N/A	(Finland) Elna Lindfors/ (Weimar Republic) Hilde Krahwinkel; N/A	N/A	(Estonia) Conni Kupsch/ (Weimar Republic) Hilde Krahwinkel; N/A	N/A
Finnish Covered Court Championships; Helsinki, Finland	(Weimar Republic) Henner Henkel; N/A	N/A	(Finland) Anita Brunou; N/A	N/A		
Finnish Covered Court Championships; Helsinki, Finland	(Weimar Republic) Heinz Eichner/Henner Henkel; N/A	N/A	(Finland) Anita Brunou/Elna Lindfors; N/A	N/A	(Finland) Bo Grotenfelt/Anita Brunou; N/A	N/A
Greek National Championships; Athens, Greece	(Greece) Augustos Zerlendis; N/A	N/A	(Greece) Miss Kasimati; N/A	N/A		
Greek National Championships; Athens, Greece	(Greece) Georgios Nikolaides/Stefanos Xydis; N/A	N/A	N/A; N/A	N/A	N/A; N/A	N/A
Danish Championships; Denmark	(Denmark) Einer Ulrich; N/A	N/A	(Denmark) Else Støckel; N/A	N/A		
Danish Championships; Denmark	(Denmark) Fritz Gleerup/Povl Henriksen; N/A	N/A	(Denmark) Ida Mølmark Jensen/Hilda Klee; N/A	N/A	(Denmark) Aase Vibe-Hastrup/Einer Ulrich; N/A	N/A
Italian National Championships; Rome, Italy	(Italy) Oscar de Minerbi; N/A	N/A	(Italy) Lucia Valerio; N/A	N/A		
Italian National Championships; Rome, Italy	(Italy) Sertorio / (Italy) Gaslini; N/A	N/A	(Italy) Gagliardi / (Italy) Luzatti; N/A	N/A	(Italy) Gaslini / (Italy) Valerio; N/A	N/A
Peruvian National Championship; Peru	(Peru) Alberto Gallo; N/A	N/A	(Peru) Adriana Alfajeme	N/A		

Event	Mixed	
Event	Champions	Runner-up
New Court Lawn Tennis Club III. Cannes, France	(France) du Plaix/ (United Kingdom) Thomas; 9–7, 6–3	(Russia) Sumarokov/ (France) d'Ayen
Cannes Lawn Tennis Club; Cannes, France	(Monaco) Gallepe/ (Netherlands) Taunay; 1–6, 6–3, 6–4	(Russia) Sumarokov/ (United Kingdom) Thomas
Portuguese Championship; Portugal	Men	
Portuguese Championship; Portugal	(Portugal) Rodrigo de Castro Pereira; N/A	N/A
Norwegian Championship; Norway	(Norway) Rolf Christoffersen; N/A	N/A
Yugoslavian Championship; Kingdom of Serbs, Croats and Slovenes	(Socialist Federal Republic of Yugoslavia) Franjo Šefer; N/A	N/A

== Rankings ==
These are the rankings compiled published in the Swiss newspaper Züricher Sport in October 1931, a second list based upon the ranks of Pierre Gillou, President of the Fédération Française de Tennis, and a third by A Wallis Myers, founder of the International Lawn Tennis Club of Great Britain.

=== Men's singles ===
Sport's World singles rankings, as of October 1931
#	Player	RG	Wi	US
1	Henri Cochet (FRA)	A	W(d)	A
2	Bunny Austin (GBR)	F(x)	QF	A
3	Ellsworth Vines (USA)	A	A	W
4	George Lott (USA)	W(d)	W(d)	W(x)
5	Frank Shields (USA)	A	F	QF
6	Fred Perry (GBR)	SF(d)	SF	SF
7	Jean Borotra (FRA)	W	SF	A
8	Sidney Wood (USA)	A	W	3R
9	Jiro Satoh (JPN)	SF	QF	A
10	John Van Ryn (USA)	W(d)	W(d)	W(d)

Gillou's World singles rankings, as of October 1931
#	Player
1	Henri Cochet (FRA)
2	Ellsworth Vines (USA)
3	Bunny Austin (GBR)
4	Frank Shields (USA)
5	Fred Perry (GBR)
6	Jean Borotra (FRA)
7	George Lott (USA)
8	Eighth entry missing
9	Sidney Wood (USA)
10	Jiro Satoh (JPN)

Myers' World singles rankings, as of November 1931
#	Player
1	Henri Cochet (FRA)
2	Bunny Austin (GBR)
3	Ellsworth Vines (USA)
4	Fred Perry (GBR)
5	Frank Shields (USA)
6	Sidney Wood (USA)
7	Jean Borotra (FRA)
8	George Lott (USA)
9	Jiro Satoh (JPN)
10	John Van Ryn (USA)

Sport's European singles rankings, as of April 1931
#	Player
1	Henri Cochet (FRA)
2	Jean Borotra (FRA)
3	Umberto de Morpurgo (ITA)
4	Christian Boussus (FRA)
5	Bunny Austin (GBR)
6	Roderich Menzel (TCH)
7	Hendrik Timmer (NED)
8	Colin Gregory (GBR)
9	Jacques Brugnon (FRA)
10	Harry Lee (GBR)
11	Giorgio de Stefani (ITA)
12	Franz Wilhelm Matejka (AUT)
13	Daniel Prenn (GER)
14	Emanuelle du Plaix (FRA)
15	Béla von Kehrling (HUN)

Sport's European singles rankings, as of October 1931
#	Player	RG	Wi	US
1	Henri Cochet (FRA)	A	W(d)	A
2	Bunny Austin (GBR)	F(x)	QF	A
3	Fred Perry (GBR)	SF(d)	SF	SF
4	Jean Borotra (FRA)	W	SF	A
5	Roderich Menzel (TCH)	4R	A	
6	Christian Boussus (FRA)	F	4R	4R
7	Pat Hughes (GBR)	SF	SF(d)	3R
8	Giorgio de Stefani (ITA)	QF	A	A
9	Franz Wilhelm Matejka (AUT)	A	3R	A
10	Béla von Kehrling (HUN)	3R	4R(x)	A

Legend
A : Absent
Wi : Wimbledon
RG : French Open
US : Us National Championships
W/F/SF/QF/R : Won/Finalist/Semi,-QuarterFinals/Rounds
(d) (x) : Only the best result is shown for each tournament in one of the competitions of the given order; singles is the default, then the doubles and mixed doubles.

=== Women's singles ===
Gillou's World singles rankings, as of October 1931
#	Player
1	Helen Moody-Wills (USA)
2	Cilly Aussem (GER)
3	Betty Nuthall (GBR)
4	Helen Jacobs (USA)
5	Hilde Krahwinkel (GER)
6	Simonne Mathieu (FRA)
7	Eileen Fearnley Whittingstall (GBR)
8	Phyllis Mudford (GBR)
9	Lolette Payot (SWI)
10	Anna Harper (USA)

Myers' World singles rankings, as of November 1931
#	Player
1	Helen Moody-Wills (USA)
2	Cilly Aussem (GER)
3	Eileen Fearnley Whittingstall (GBR)
4	Helen Jacobs (USA)
5	Betty Nuthall (GBR)
6	Hilde Krahwinkel (GER)
7	Simonne Mathieu (FRA)
8	Lilí de Álvarez (ESP)
9	Phyllis Mudford (GBR)
10	Elsie Pittman (GBR)

Sport's European singles rankings, as of April 1931
#	Player
1	Cilly Aussem (GER)
2	Simonne Mathieu (FRA)
3	Phoebe Holcroft Watson (GBR)
4	Betty Nuthall (GBR)
5	Lilí de Álvarez (ESP)
6	Phyllis Mudford (GBR)
7	Joan Ridley (GBR)
8	Hilde Krahwinkel (GER)
9	Elsie Pittman (GBR)
10	Jaqueline Foy (FRA)
11	Josane Sigart (BEL)
12	Lolette Payot (SWI)
13	Ida Adamoff (FRA)
14	Ilse Friedleben (GER)
15	Arlette Neufeld (FRA)

== Notes ==
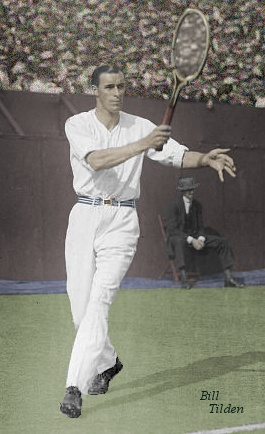
1931 Pro tour champion Bill Tilden

- ^{a} The men, women and mixed contests were held at different locations at different dates. The final was suspended due to Béla von Kehrling's schedule conflict (he travelled to Wimbledon), and was finished later. The same reason forced him to withdraw from the doubles and mixed doubles draws as well.
- ^{b} Both Roderich Menzel and Gustav Jaenecke reached the main draw from the qualifying rounds.
- ^{c} The men's, women's and mixed contests were held at different locations at different dates. The West Side Tennis Club of Forest Hill, California, organized the men's (September 5–12), women's singles and doubles (17–22 August) while the men's and mixed doubles took place in Chestnut Hill, Massachusetts, from 24 to 29 August.
- ^{d} The mixed doubles final of the Bad Homburg Championship remained unplayed. The prize money was halved between the finalists.
- ^{e} The women's championships were played in a round-robin format (meaning players played against all the other players in their group).
- ^{f} Several matches were suspended and cancelled due to hailstorms and blizzards. Many players travelled home and granted walkovers to their opponents.
- ^{g}^{h} Sources differ regarding the scores of certain finals of this event. Tennisz és Golf of Budapest (g) and The Argus of Melbourne (h) claim the men's singles and doubles scores differently though they both agree on their outcome.
- ^{i} Frank Shields wasn't able to compete in the final of the Wimbledon Championships because of a twisted knee, which was injured in the ninth game of the fourth set of his semifinal match against Jean Borotra.

== See also ==
- Grand Slam (tennis)#Three-Quarter Slam
