= 1934 Wightman Cup =

International women's tennis competition

Details
- Edition: 12th

Champion
- Winning nation: United States

The 1934 Wightman Cup was the 12th edition of the annual women's team tennis competition between the United States and Great Britain. It was held at the All England Lawn Tennis and Croquet Club in London in England in the United Kingdom.

Great Britain
2
All England Lawn Tennis and Croquet Club, London, England, United Kingdom
1934
Grass

United States
5

			1	2	3
1	(United Kingdom) (United States)	Dorothy Round; Sarah Palfrey	3; 6	6; 3	6; 8
2	(United Kingdom) (United States)	Margaret Scriven; Helen Jacobs	1; 6	1; 6
3	(United Kingdom) (United States)	Dorothy Round; Helen Jacobs	4; 6	4; 6
4	(United Kingdom) (United States)	Margaret Scriven; Sarah Palfrey	6; 4	2; 6	6; 8
5	(United Kingdom) (United States)	Betty Nuthall; Carolin Babcock	5; 7	6; 3	6; 4
6	(United Kingdom) (United States)	Nancy Lyle / Evelyn Dearman; Carolin Babcock / Josephine Cruickshank	7; 5	7; 5
7	(United Kingdom) (United States)	Kathleen McKane Godfree / Betty Nuthall; Helen Jacobs / Sarah Palfrey	7; 5	3; 6	2; 6

== See also ==
- 1934 Davis Cup
