= Nuvia Vega =

Ecuadorian politician (born c. 1996)

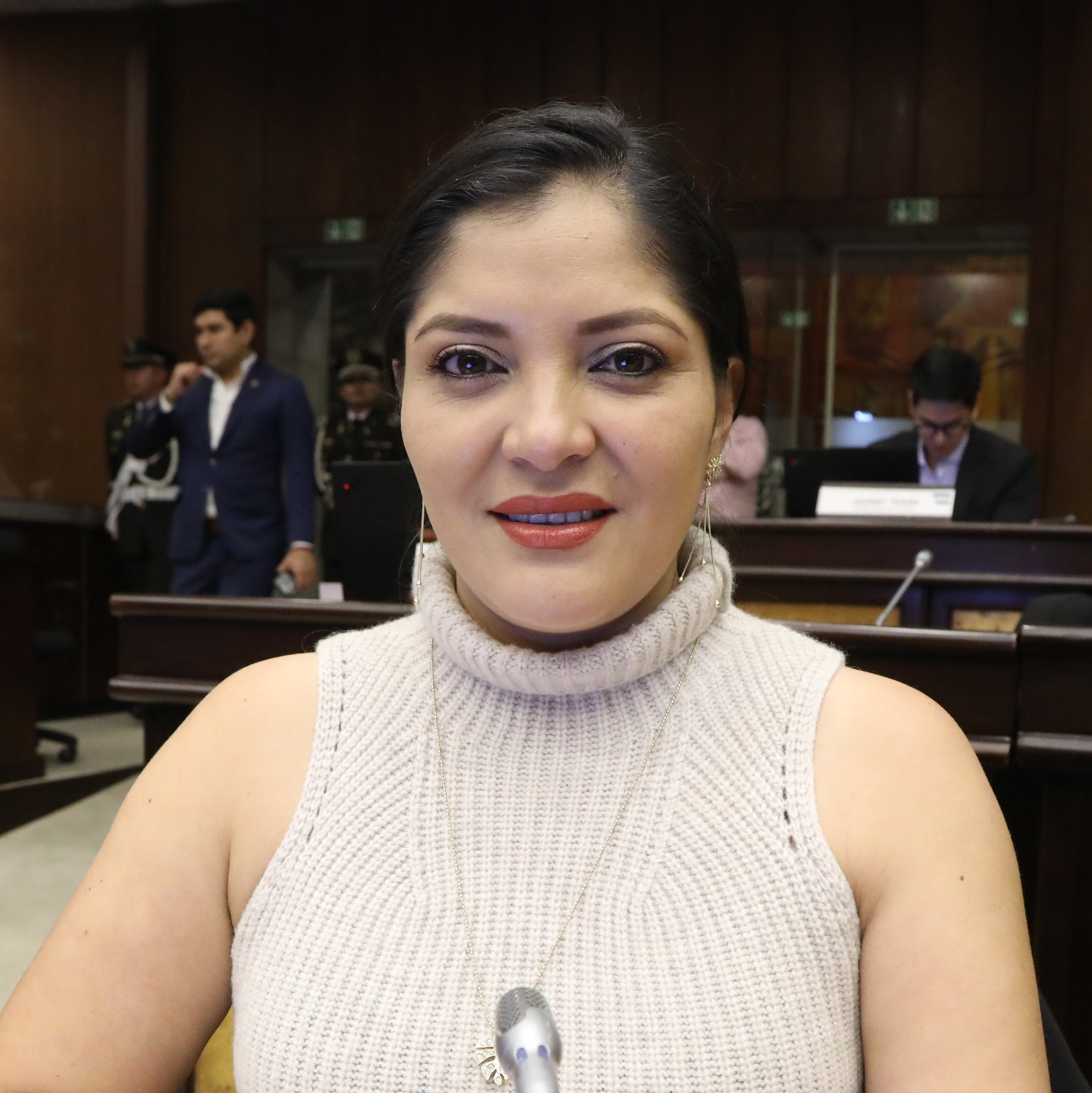
- Vega in 2025
- Occupation: politician
- Known for: member of the National Assembly
- Political party: National Democratic Action

Nuvia Rocío Vega Morillo (born c.1996) is an Ecuadorian politician who became a member of the National Assembly in 2025.

== Life ==
Vega was the governor of Orellana before she was replaced by Alexandra Maricela Villavicencio Quezada who became an acting governor after being appointed by Daniel Noboa in October 2024. Noboa announced that four governors would be replaced and she was one of them.

She joined the party started and led by was intrigued by Daniel Noboa and she was elected to the National Assembly.

She was elected on 16 May 2025, as a member of the National Assembly. She represents the Province of Orellana and her substitute is Romero Torres Alex Michael. She joined the Assembly's Justice and State Structure Commission which is led by Rosa Torres. The other commissioners include assembly members, Maria Gabriela Molina Menéndez, Eliana Correa González and Anelisse Josebeth Jaramillo Rodríguez. She proposed that two amendments to the law on tenancy should be merged to reduce the time required to bring them to law.
