= Wanda Dubieńska =

Polish fencer (1895–1968)

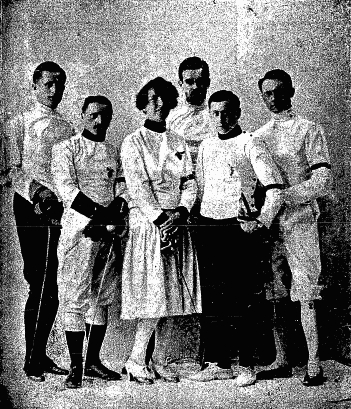
- Wanda Dubieńska third from left 1922

Personal information
- Born: 12 June 1895 Kraków, Austria-Hungary
- Died: 28 November 1968 (aged 73) Rząska, Poland

Sport
- Sport: Fencing

Wanda Dubieńska born Nowak (12 June 1895 – 28 November 1968) was a Polish fencer, tennis player, cross-country skier and sport celebrity and the daughter of Julian Nowak. She competed in the women's individual foil event at the 1924 Summer Olympics. She was the first woman to represent Poland at the Olympics. Dubieńska was buried in the Rakowicki Cemetery.

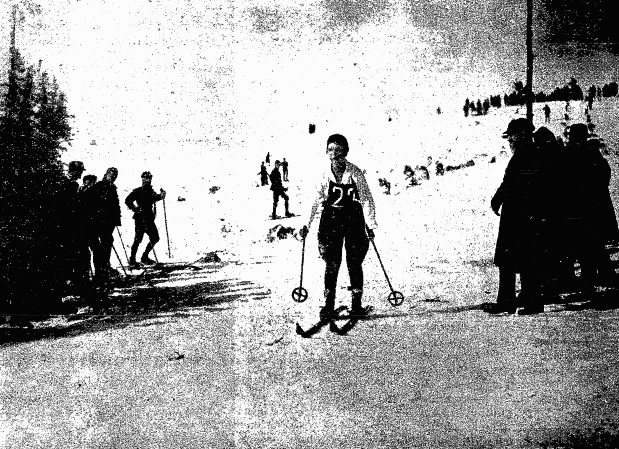
Wanda Dubieńska in Zakopane, 1922
