= Rosa Torres =

Ecuadorian parliamentary member

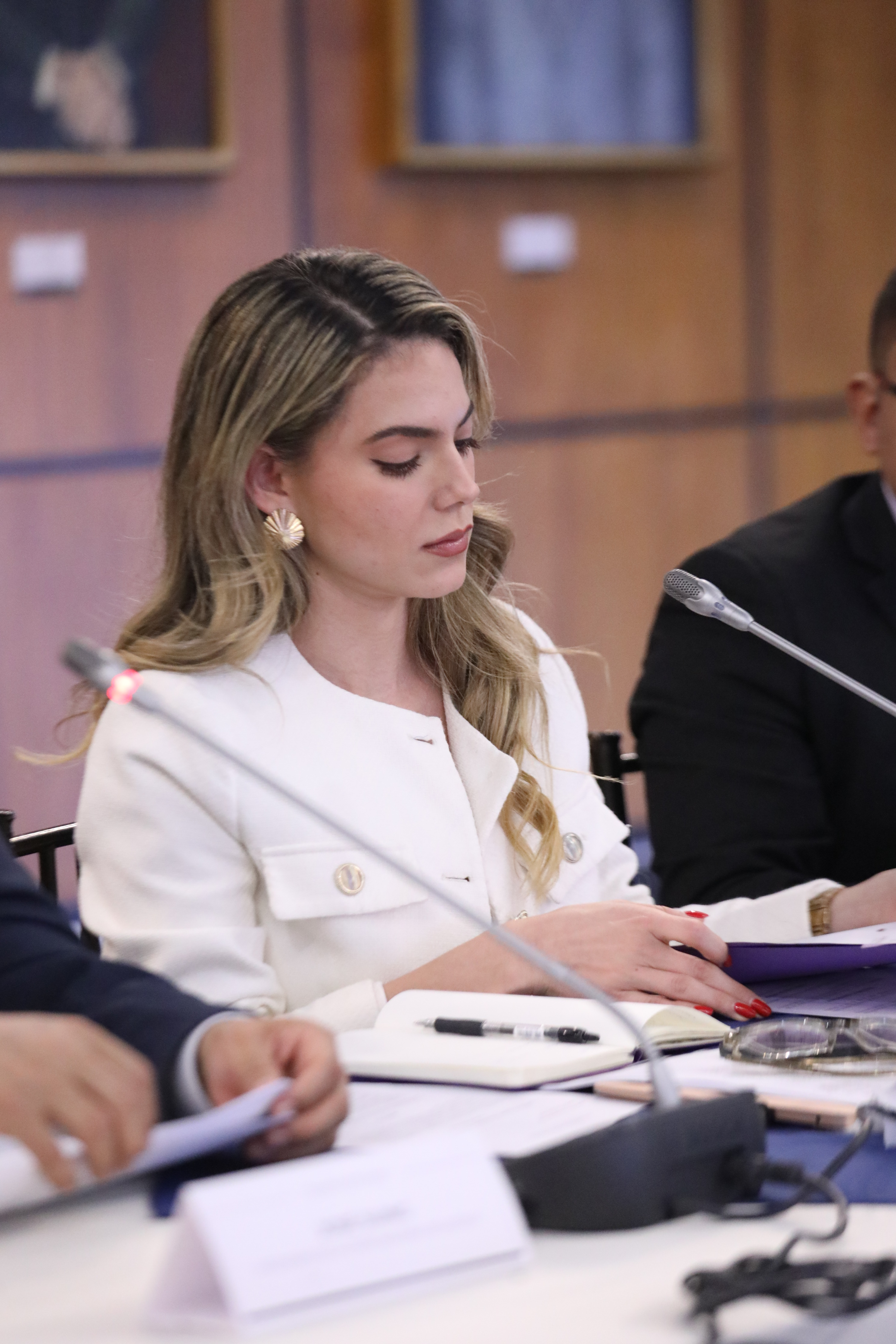
- Chairing the Justice Commission in 2025
- Born: c.1996 Quevedo, Ecuador
- Occupations: lawyer and politician
- Political party: National Democratic Action (Ecuador)

Rosa Alegría Torres Cadena (born c.1996) is an Ecuadorian former Miss Ecuador contestant, current member of the National Assembly since 2025.

== Life ==
Torres was born in the 1990s in Quevedo. Her father, Lusgardo Torres, was a teacher who became a deputy mayor of Quevedo canton. She says he gave her a work ethic. A street in her town is named for her father. She trained to be a lawyer and worked in the public sector.

In 2017 she was a contestant in that year's Miss Ecuador contest. In 2025 Torres became a member of the National Assembly representing her home Province of Los Ríos. She was a member of the National Democratic Action party.

She was intrigued by Daniel Noboa and she was an early fan, joining his new party. His party is known for trusting younger people and she is one of them. She notes that Noboa's father gained his riches by working in her province.

Torres was elected on 16 May 2025, as the president of the National Assembly's Justice and State Structure Commission. She will serve for two years. The other commissioners include assembly members, Maria Gabriela Molina Menéndez, Eliana Correa González, Anelisse Josebeth Jaramillo Rodríguez and Nuvia Rocío Vega Morillo.
