= Josephine Cruickshank =

America tennis player

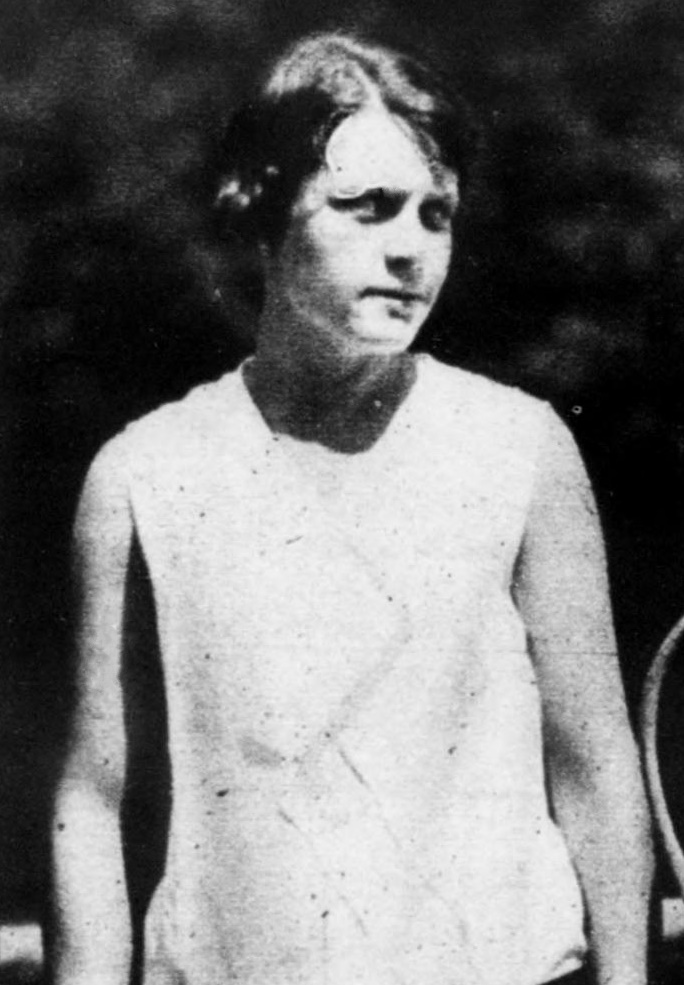
- Cruickshank in 1929
- Country (sports): United States
- Born: January 18, 1909 Santa Ana, California, United States
- Died: March 12, 1997 (aged 88) United States
- Plays: Right-handed

Singles

Grand Slam singles results
- French Open: 2R (1934)
- US Open: QF (1933)

Team competitions
- Wightman Cup: W (1934)

Josephine Cruickshank (January 18, 1909 – March 12, 1997) was a female tennis player from the United States who was active in the 1930s.

Cruickshank grew up in Tustin, California where she learned to play tennis on the tennis court her father had installed at their home and he was also her instructor. She played tennis at nearby Santa Ana High School. Cruikshank was educated at the University of California, Berkeley where she was trained by Pop Fuller of the Berkeley Tennis Club.

She became the girls national doubles champion in 1927 partnering Marjorie Gladman after a victory in the final against Clara Louise Zinke and Lee Palfrey.

At the 1933 U.S. Championships Cruickshank defeated world No. 5 Margaret Scriven to reach the quarterfinals of the singles event, which she lost in straight sets to eventual champion Helen Jacobs. In 1933 she won the singles title at the Southern California Championships, held at the Los Angeles Tennis Club. At the Pacific Southwest Championships she was a singles runner-up in 1931, losing in the final to Anna McCune Harper. At the Seabright Invitational grass court tournament she reached the singles final in 1930 and 1932 but lost both times, to McCune Harper and Helen Jacobs respectively.

Cruickshank was the No. 5 ranked women's singles player in the United States in 1930 and 1932 and No. 6 in 1933.

In 1934, she was a member of the United States team on the Wightman Cup against Great Britain, held at the All England Lawn Tennis and Croquet Club in London. The United States won 5–2 but Cruickshank lost her doubles match partnering Carolin Babcock in two sets to Nancy Lyle and Evelyn Dearman.

Cruickshank was inducted into the Orange County Sports Hall of Fame in 1994.
