= 1931 Wimbledon Championships – Mixed doubles =

Mixed doubles
- 1931 Wimbledon Championships

Final
- Champions: (United States) George Lott (United States) Anna Harper
- Runners-up: (United Kingdom) Ian Collins (United Kingdom) Joan Ridley
- Score: 6–3, 1–6, 6–1

Details
- Draw: 80 (5Q)
- Seeds: 4

Events
Singles	men	women		boys	girls
Doubles	men	women	mixed	boys	girls
- Wimbledon Championships

Jack Crawford and Elizabeth Ryan were the defending champions, but did not participate.

George Lott and Anna Harper defeated Ian Collins and Joan Ridley in the final, 6–3, 1–6, 6–1 to win the mixed doubles tennis title at the 1931 Wimbledon Championships.

== Seeds ==
1. (France) Henri Cochet / (United Kingdom) Eileen Fearnley-Whittingstall (fourth round)
2. (South Africa) Pat Spence / (United Kingdom) Betty Nuthall (semifinals)
3. (South Africa) Vernon Kirby / (Belgium) Josane Sigart (quarterfinals)
4. (United Kingdom) Pat Hughes / (United Kingdom) Ermyntrude Harvey (fourth round)

Click on the seed number of a player to go to their draw section.

== Draw ==
Key

- Q = Qualifier
- WC = Wild card
- LL = Lucky loser
- Alt = Alternate
- ITF = ITF entry
- PR = Protected ranking
- SR = Special ranking
- SE = Special exempt
- JE = Junior exempt
- JR = Junior Accelerator Programme entrant
- CO = College Accelerator Programme entrant
- NG = Next Gen Accelerator Program entrant
- w/o = Walkover
- r = Retired
- d = Defaulted

=== Finals ===
Quarterfinals
2	(South Africa) Pat Spence (United Kingdom) Betty Nuthall	6	6
(Japan) Iwao Aoki (United Kingdom) Beatrice Feltham	4	2
(United Kingdom) Ian Collins (United Kingdom) Joan Ridley	6	8	7
(United Kingdom) Colin Gregory (United Kingdom) Elsie Pittman	4	6	5
(Spain) Enrique Maier (France) Ida Adamoff	2	6	3
(United States) George Lott (United States) Anna Harper	6	4	6
3	(South Africa) Vernon Kirby (Belgium) Josane Sigart	8	3	8
(United Kingdom) Fred Perry (United Kingdom) Mary Heeley	6	6	10

Semifinals
2	(South Africa) Pat Spence (United Kingdom) Betty Nuthall	6	4	4
(United Kingdom) Ian Collins (United Kingdom) Joan Ridley	4	6	6
(United States) George Lott (United States) Anna Harper	1	3
(United Kingdom) Fred Perry (United Kingdom) Mary Heeley	6	4^{r}

Final
(United Kingdom) Ian Collins (United Kingdom) Joan Ridley	3	6	1
(United States) George Lott (United States) Anna Harper	6	1	6

=== Top half ===
==== Section 1 ====
First round

Second round
2	(South Africa) Pat Spence (United Kingdom) Betty Nuthall	6	6
(United Kingdom) Patrick Wheatley (United Kingdom) Nancy Lyle	3	3
(United Kingdom) Guy Cooper (United Kingdom) Gwen Sterry	10	11
(United Kingdom) CH Watson (United Kingdom) Eleanor Rose	8	9
(France) Christian Boussus (United Kingdom) Joan Lycett	6	8
(United Kingdom) Teddy Higgs (United Kingdom) Doreen Busby	3	6
(Germany) Gottfried von Cramm (Germany) Cilly Aussem	6	6
(Japan) Jiro Sato (Poland) Jadwiga Jędrzejowska	3	4

Third round
2	(South Africa) P Spence (United Kingdom) B Nuthall	4	8	6
(United Kingdom) G Cooper (United Kingdom) G Sterry	6	6	3
(France) C Boussus (United Kingdom) J Lycett	8	6
(Germany) G von Cramm (Germany) C Aussem	6	4

Fourth round
2	(South Africa) P Spence (United Kingdom) B Nuthall	6	6
(France) C Boussus (United Kingdom) J Lycett	1	2

==== Section 2 ====
First round

Second round
(United Kingdom) Eric Peters (United Kingdom) Effie Hemmant	1	8	4
(Kingdom of Yugoslavia) Franjo Kukuljević (United Kingdom) Winifred Beamish	6	6	6
(United Kingdom) Alan Brown (United Kingdom) CJ Tyrrell	8	6	4
(United Kingdom) Raymond Tuckey (United Kingdom) Agnes Tuckey	10	3	6
(Netherlands) Ody Koopman (Netherlands) Mence Dros-Canters	8	4	4
(Japan) Iwao Aoki (United Kingdom) Beatrice Feltham	6	6	6
(France) Raymond Rodel (United Kingdom) Ruth Kirk	w/o
(United Kingdom) Brian Gilbert (Germany) Anne Peitz

Third round
(Kingdom of Yugoslavia) F Kukuljević (United Kingdom) W Beamish	6	6
(United Kingdom) R Tuckey (United Kingdom) A Tuckey	4	4
(Japan) I Aoki (United Kingdom) B Feltham	7	6
(United Kingdom) B Gilbert (Germany) A Peitz	5	1

Fourth round
(Kingdom of Yugoslavia) F Kukuljević (United Kingdom) W Beamish	8	2	4
(Japan) I Aoki (United Kingdom) B Feltham	6	6	6

==== Section 3 ====
First round

Second round
4	(United Kingdom) Pat Hughes (United Kingdom) Ermyntrude Harvey	6	8
(United Kingdom) Alfred Ingram (United Kingdom) Peggy Pleydell-Bouverie	3	6
(United Kingdom) Arthur Vinall (United Kingdom) Dorothy Jameson	6	3	4
Q	(United Kingdom) Henry Burrows (United Kingdom) J Lawson	3	6	6
(United Kingdom) Roy Poland (United Kingdom) Sybil Johnson	4	6	6
(United Kingdom) William Powell (United Kingdom) Enid Clarke	6	3	2
(United Kingdom) Ian Collins (United Kingdom) Joan Ridley	6	3	6
(France) Jean Lesueur (France) Simonne Mathieu	4	6	2

Third round
4	(United Kingdom) P Hughes (United Kingdom) E Harvey
Q	(United Kingdom) H Burrows (United Kingdom) J Lawson	w/o
(United Kingdom) R Poland (United Kingdom) S Johnson	6	2	3
(United Kingdom) I Collins (United Kingdom) J Ridley	4	6	6

Fourth round
4	(United Kingdom) P Hughes (United Kingdom) E Harvey	2	6
(United Kingdom) I Collins (United Kingdom) J Ridley	6	8

==== Section 4 ====
First round
(United Kingdom) Colin Gregory (United Kingdom) Elsie Pittman	6	6	6
(United Kingdom) Billy Collins (United Kingdom) Margaret Stocks	8	3	2
(South Africa) Norman Farquharson (United States) Helen Jacobs	15	1
(United Kingdom) Harry Lee (United Kingdom) Phyllis Mudford	17	6
(United Kingdom) Norman Latchford (United Kingdom) Madge List	0	1
(United Kingdom) Ted Avory (United Kingdom) Joan Strawson	6	6
(Denmark) Helge Plougmann (United Kingdom) R Watson
(France) Pierre Goldschmidt (France) Edith Belliard	w/o
Q	(United Kingdom) David Williams (United Kingdom) Helen Dyson	0	5
(Czechoslovakia) Ferenc Maršálek (United Kingdom) Joan Ingram	6	7
(United Kingdom) Brian Helmore (United Kingdom) Dorothy Hill	6	3	5
(France) André Merlin (France) Violette Gallay	4	6	7
(Egypt) Pierre Grandguillot (Egypt) E Alexandroff
(United Kingdom) Edward Dearman (United Kingdom) Evelyn Dearman	w/o
(France) Benny Berthet (France) Rosie Berthet	4	3
(South Africa) Louis Raymond (United Kingdom) Dorothy Shepherd-Barron	6	6

Second round
(United Kingdom) C Gregory (United Kingdom) E Pittman	14	6
(United Kingdom) H Lee (United Kingdom) P Mudford	12	10
(United Kingdom) E Avory (United Kingdom) J Strawson
(Denmark) H Plougmann (United Kingdom) R Watson	w/o
(Czechoslovakia) F Maršálek (United Kingdom) J Ingram	6	6
(France) A Merlin (France) V Gallay	0	2
(Egypt) P Grandguillot (Egypt) E Alexandroff	4	2
(South Africa) L Raymond (United Kingdom) D Shepherd-Barron	6	6

Third round
(United Kingdom) C Gregory (United Kingdom) E Pittman	10	2	6
(United Kingdom) E Avory (United Kingdom) J Strawson	8	6	3
(Czechoslovakia) F Maršálek (United Kingdom) J Ingram	w/o
(South Africa) L Raymond (United Kingdom) D Shepherd-Barron

Fourth round
(United Kingdom) C Gregory (United Kingdom) E Pittman	8	6
(South Africa) L Raymond (United Kingdom) D Shepherd-Barron

=== Bottom half ===
==== Section 5 ====
First round
1	(France) Henri Cochet (United Kingdom) Eileen Bennett Whittingstall	6	6
(Denmark) Bent Panker (United Kingdom) Madge Slaney	2	1
(Japan) Ryuki Miki (United Kingdom) Dorothy Round	6	6
(India) Hira-Lal Soni (United Kingdom) Helen Burr	3	2
(Japan) Hyotaro Sato (United Kingdom) MA Thomas	6	6
(Germany) Eberhard Nourney (Germany) Hilde Krahwinkel	3	3
(New Zealand) Cam Malfroy (United Kingdom) Billie Yorke	1	3
(France) Pierre Henri Landry (France) Arlette Neufeld	6	6
(United Kingdom) John Olliff (United Kingdom) Kitty Godfree	4	6	6
Q	(United Kingdom) Laddie Wheatcroft (United Kingdom) Christabel Wheatcroft	6	3	3
(France) Emmanuel du Plaix (United Kingdom) JE Stevens	3	3
(Spain) Enrique Maier (France) Ida Adamoff	6	6
(France) Antoine Gentien (France) Doris Metaxa	2	4
(Japan) Minoru Kawachi (France) Jacqueline Gallay	6	6
Q	(United Kingdom) Douglas Hodges (France) Elizabeth Macready	8	6
(Kingdom of Yugoslavia) Franjo Schaeffer (United Kingdom) Kathleen Bridge	6	4

Second round
1	(France) H Cochet (United Kingdom) E Fearnley-Whittingstall	6	6
(Japan) T Miki (United Kingdom) D Round	3	3
(Japan) H Sato (United Kingdom) MA Thomas	1	6	6
(France) PH Landry (France) A Neufeld	6	1	4
(United Kingdom) J Olliff (United Kingdom) K Godfree	3	5
(Spain) E Maier (France) I Adamoff	6	7
(Japan) M Kawachi (France) J Gallay	3	4
Q	(United Kingdom) D Hodges (France) E Macready	6	6

Third round
1	(France) H Cochet (United Kingdom) E Fearnley-Whittingstall	6	6
(Japan) H Sato (United Kingdom) MA Thomas	1	4
(Spain) E Maier (France) I Adamoff	6	4	8
Q	(United Kingdom) D Hodges (France) E Macready	4	6	6

Fourth round
1	(France) H Cochet (United Kingdom) E Fearnley-Whittingstall	8	10	2
(Spain) E Maier (France) I Adamoff	6	12	6

==== Section 6 ====
First round

Second round
(Austria) Hermann Artens (Greece) Helene Nicolopoulos	6	3
(United States) George Lott (United States) Anna Harper	8	6
(Soviet Union) Sergei Rodzianko (Spain) Bella Pons	w/o
(United Kingdom) Cyril Eames (France) Jacqueline Goldschmidt
(United Kingdom) Lewis Michell (United Kingdom) Peggy Michell	5	6	6
(United Kingdom) Jimmy Nuthall (United States) Marjorie Van Ryn	7	3	1
(Hungary) Béla von Kehrling (United Kingdom) Phyllis Satterthwaite
(United Kingdom) Gordon Crole-Rees (United Kingdom) Grace Vaughton	w/o

Third round
(United States) G Lott (United States) A Harper	6	6	6
(United Kingdom) C Eames (France) J Goldschmidt	1	8	0
(United Kingdom) L Michell (United Kingdom) M Michell	3	4
(Hungary) B von Kehrling (United Kingdom) P Satterthwaite	6	6

Fourth round
(United States) G Lott (United States) A Harper	6	6
(Hungary) B von Kehrling (United Kingdom) P Satterthwaite	3	4

==== Section 7 ====
First round

Second round
3	(South Africa) Vernon Kirby (Belgium) Josane Sigart	6	6
(United Kingdom) Keats Lester (United Kingdom) Freda James	4	4
(United Kingdom) Frank Wilde (United Kingdom) Naomi Trentham	6	7
Q	(United Kingdom) LHA Hankey (United Kingdom) Olga Webb	1	5
(United Kingdom) Charles Kingsley (United Kingdom) Phoebe Watson	6	6
(India) Janmeja Charanjiva (United Kingdom) Margery Elton	3	3
(United Kingdom) Donald Greig (United Kingdom) Mie Johnstone	2	6	6
(South Africa) Gerald Sherwell (United Kingdom) Vera Montgomery	6	1	2

Third round
3	(South Africa) V Kirby (Belgium) J Sigart	9	6
(United Kingdom) F Wilde (United Kingdom) N Trentham	7	0
(United Kingdom) C Kingsley (United Kingdom) P Watson	6	9
(United Kingdom) D Greig (United Kingdom) M Johnstone	1	7

Fourth round
3	(South Africa) V Kirby (Belgium) J Sigart	6	10
(United Kingdom) C Kingsley (United Kingdom) P Watson	3	8

==== Section 8 ====
First round

Second round
(Czechoslovakia) Ladislav Hecht (United Kingdom) Davinia Townsend	7	2	6
(United Kingdom) Herman David (United Kingdom) Elsa Haylock	5	6	2
(France) Jean Borotra; Miss Partner	w/o
(Republic of Ireland) Charles Scroope (United Kingdom) Betty Dix
(France) Jacques Brugnon (Germany) Edith Sander	w/o
(Switzerland) Edward Flury (Switzerland) Lolette Payot
(United Kingdom) Fred Perry (United Kingdom) Mary Heeley	6	6
(United Kingdom) Edward Buzzard (United Kingdom) Evelyn Goldsworth	3	2

Third round
(Czechoslovakia) L Hecht (United Kingdom) D Townsend	7	0
(Republic of Ireland) C Scroope (United Kingdom) B Dix	9	6
(Switzerland) E Flury (Switzerland) L Payot	6	2
(United Kingdom) F Perry (United Kingdom) M Heeley	8	6

Fourth round
(Republic of Ireland) C Scroope (United Kingdom) B Dix	3	7	5
(United Kingdom) F Perry (United Kingdom) M Heeley	6	5	7

The nationality of Miss Partner is unknown.
