= 1931 Wimbledon Championships – Men's doubles =

Tennis tournament

Men's doubles
- 1931 Wimbledon Championships

Final
- Champions: (United States) George Lott (United States) John Van Ryn
- Runners-up: (France) Jacques Brugnon (France) Henri Cochet
- Score: 6–2, 10–8, 9–11, 3–6, 6–3

Details
- Draw: 64 (5Q)
- Seeds: 4

Events
Singles	men	women		boys	girls
Doubles	men	women	mixed	boys	girls
- Wimbledon Championships

Wilmer Allison and John Van Ryn were the defending champions, but Allison did not compete. Van Ryn partnered with George Lott, and defeated Jacques Brugnon and Henri Cochet in the final, 6–2, 10–8, 9–11, 3–6, 6–3 to win the gentlemen's doubles tennis title at the 1931 Wimbledon Championship.

== Seeds ==
1. (United States) George Lott / (United States) John Van Ryn (champions)
2. (France) Jacques Brugnon / (France) Henri Cochet (final)
3. (United Kingdom) Pat Hughes / (United Kingdom) Fred Perry (semifinals)
4. (United Kingdom) Ian Collins / (United Kingdom) Colin Gregory (quarterfinals)

Click on the seed number of a player to go to their draw section.

== Draw ==
Key

- Q = Qualifier
- WC = Wild card
- LL = Lucky loser
- Alt = Alternate
- ITF = ITF entry
- PR = Protected ranking
- SR = Special ranking
- SE = Special exempt
- JE = Junior exempt
- JR = Junior Accelerator Programme entrant
- CO = College Accelerator Programme entrant
- NG = Next Gen Accelerator Program entrant
- w/o = Walkover
- r = Retired
- d = Defaulted

=== Finals ===
Quarterfinals
2	(France) Jacques Brugnon (France) Henri Cochet	4	6	8	6
(Japan) Minoru Kawachi (Japan) Jiro Sato	6	2	6	4
4	(United Kingdom) Ian Collins (United Kingdom) Colin Gregory	6	3	6	4	3
(United States) Frank Shields (United States) Sidney Wood	3	6	3	6	6
1	(United States) George Lott (United States) John Van Ryn	6	6	7
(France) Pierre Henri Landry (United States) Gregory Mangin	0	2	5
3	(United Kingdom) Pat Hughes (United Kingdom) Fred Perry	4	6	6	1	9
(South Africa) Norman Farquharson (South Africa) Vernon Kirby	6	4	2	6	7

Semifinals
2	(France) Jacques Brugnon (France) Henri Cochet	6	7	6
(United States) Frank Shields (United States) Sidney Wood	4	5	2
1	(United States) George Lott (United States) John Van Ryn	6	11	8
3	(United Kingdom) Pat Hughes (United Kingdom) Fred Perry	4	9	6

Final
2	(France) Jacques Brugnon (France) Henri Cochet	2	8	11	6	3
1	(United States) George Lott (United States) John Van Ryn	6	10	9	3	6

=== Top half ===
==== Section 1 ====
First round
2	(France) Jacques Brugnon (France) Henri Cochet	6	10	6
(Japan) Iwao Aoki (Japan) Ryuki Miki	4	8	3
(Switzerland) Edward Flury (Monaco) Vladimir Landau
(French Indochina) Giao Van Huynh (French Indochina) Chim Van Nguyen	w/o
(United Kingdom) GA Barber (United Kingdom) CH Watson	1	0	4
(France) Antoine Gentien (France) Jean Lesueur	6	6	6
(Germany) Heinrich Kleinschroth (Spain) Enrique Maier	4	2	2
Q	(United Kingdom) GR Ashton (United Kingdom) Laddie Wheatcroft	6	6	6
(Japan) Minoru Kawachi (Japan) Jiro Sato	7	6	6
(United Kingdom) Alan Brown (United Kingdom) Lewis Michell	5	4	1
Q	(United Kingdom) Harvey Hillier (United Kingdom) David Williams	4	6	4	6	5
(United Kingdom) Herman David (United Kingdom) Norman Latchford	6	2	6	4	7
(New Zealand) Frank Fisher (Argentina) Andrés Sissener	4	6	4
(India) Janmeja Charanjiva (India) Syed Mohammad Hadi	6	8	6
(United Kingdom) Edward Dearman (South Africa) Gerald Sherwell	0^{r}
(Germany) Gottfried von Cramm (Germany) Eberhard Nourney	2

Second round
2	(France) J Brugnon (France) H Cochet	6	6	4	6
(Switzerland) E Flury (Monaco) V Landau	3	6	2
(France) A Gentien (France) J Lesueur	7	7	7
Q	(United Kingdom) GR Ashton (United Kingdom) I Wheatcroft	5	5	5
(Japan) M Kawachi (Japan) J Sato	6	6	6
(United Kingdom) H David (United Kingdom) N Latchford	0	3	1
(India) J Charanjiva (India) SM Hadi	6	6	6
(Germany) G von Cramm (Germany) E Nourney	4	1	3

Third round
2	(France) J Brugnon (France) H Cochet	7	6	5	6
(France) A Gentien (France) J Lesueur	5	3	7	1
(Japan) M Kawachi (Japan) J Sato	6	6	6
(India) J Charanjiva (India) SM Hadi	4	2	2

Quarterfinals
2	(France) J Brugnon (France) H Cochet	4	6	8	6
(Japan) M Kawachi (Japan) J Sato	6	2	6	4

==== Section 2 ====
First round
4	(United Kingdom) Ian Collins (United Kingdom) Colin Gregory	9	6	4	6
(Czechoslovakia) Ladislav Hecht (Czechoslovakia) Josef Maleček	7	2	6	3
(United Kingdom) Bunny Austin (United Kingdom) Charles Kingsley	6	6	6
(Denmark) Bent Panker (Denmark) Helge Plougmann	4	0	2
(France) Pierre Goldschmidt (Egypt) Pierre Grandguillot	6	6	4	4	7
(United Kingdom) Guy Cooper (United Kingdom) Donald Greig	4	2	6	6	9
(United Kingdom) Kenneth Gandar-Dower (United Kingdom) William Powell	6	6	2	6
(Kingdom of Yugoslavia) Franjo Kukuljević (Kingdom of Yugoslavia) Franjo Schaeffer	4	2	6	3
(South Africa) Louis Raymond (South Africa) Pat Spence	5	4	6	8	6
(Argentina) Lucilo del Castillo (Austria) Franz Matejka	7	6	1	6	3
(United Kingdom) JH Frowen (United Kingdom) Jack Lysaght
(Romania) Nicolas Magaloff (Soviet Union) Sergei Rodzianko	w/o
(United Kingdom) Gordon Crole-Rees (United Kingdom) Cyril Eames	6	1	4	6	6
(United Kingdom) Teddy Higgs (United Kingdom) Frank Jarvis	3	6	6	4	2
(United States) Frank Shields (United States) Sidney Wood	6	6	3	6
(United Kingdom) Cyril Fletcher (United Kingdom) John Fletcher	3	3	6	2

Second round
4	(United Kingdom) I Collins (United Kingdom) C Gregory	8	6	3	6
(United Kingdom) H Austin (United Kingdom) C Kingsley	6	4	6	2
(United Kingdom) G Cooper (United Kingdom) D Greig	4	6	6	6
(United Kingdom) K Gandar-Dower (United Kingdom) W Powell	6	1	4	4
(South Africa) L Raymond (South Africa) P Spence
(United Kingdom) JH Frowen (United Kingdom) J Lysaght	w/o
(United Kingdom) G Crole-Rees (United Kingdom) C Eames	0	1	2
(United States) F Shields (United States) S Wood	6	6	6

Third round
4	(United Kingdom) I Collins (United Kingdom) C Gregory	6	9	8	4	7
(United Kingdom) G Cooper (United Kingdom) D Greig	2	7	10	6	5
(South Africa) L Raymond (South Africa) P Spence	7	6	4	2	0
(United States) F Shields (United States) S Wood	5	1	6	6	6

Quarterfinals
4	(United Kingdom) I Collins (United Kingdom) C Gregory	6	3	6	4	3
(United States) F Shields (United States) S Wood	3	6	3	6	6

=== Bottom half ===
==== Section 3 ====
First round
1	(United States) George Lott (United States) John Van Ryn
(France) Emmanuel du Plaix (France) Raymond Rodel	w/o
(United Kingdom) Jimmy Nuthall (United Kingdom) Raymond Tuckey	6	6	6
(United Kingdom) Philip Glover (United Kingdom) Dickie Ritchie	1	3	4
(Austria) Hermann Artens (Hungary) Béla von Kehrling	0	8	6	6
(Argentina) Ronaldo Boyd (Argentina) Adriano Zappa	6	6	4	1
(United Kingdom) Claude Metcalf (United Kingdom) Arthur Vinall	7	7	3	4
(United Kingdom) Leighton Crawford (United Kingdom) Geoffrey de Ste. Croix	9	5	6	6
(United Kingdom) Victor Cazalet (United Kingdom) John Cecil Masterman	7	2	6
Q	(United Kingdom) Freddie Della Porta (United Kingdom) Harold Gunn	9	6	8
(France) Pierre Henri Landry (United States) Gregory Mangin
(France) Jean Borotra (France) Christian Boussus	w/o
(United Kingdom) Henry Burrows (United Kingdom) JD Burrows	3	6	6	7
(France) Benny Berthet (France) André Merlin	6	3	8	9
(United Kingdom) Brian Gilbert (United Kingdom) Noel Turnbull	6	6	8	6
(United Kingdom) Billy Collins (United Kingdom) FR Scovel	4	4	10	2

Second round
1	(United States) G Lott (United States) J Van Ryn	6	6	10
(United Kingdom) J Nuthall (United Kingdom) R Tuckey	4	4	8
(Austria) H Artens (Hungary) B von Kehrling	0	6	6	8
(United Kingdom) FRL Crawford (United Kingdom) G de Ste. Croix	6	1	1	6
Q	(United Kingdom) A Della Porta (United Kingdom) H Gunn	3	4	10
(France) PH Landry (United States) G Mangin	6	6	12
(France) B Berthet (France) A Merlin	2	6	1	4
(United Kingdom) B Gilbert (United Kingdom) N Turnbull	6	3	6	6

Third round
1	(United States) G Lott (United States) J Van Ryn	6	6	6	6
(Austria) H Artens (Hungary) B von Kehrling	3	2	8	1
(France) PH Landry (United States) G Mangin	6	7	6
(United Kingdom) B Gilbert (United Kingdom) N Turnbull	1	5	3

Quarterfinals
1	(United States) G Lott (United States) J Van Ryn	6	6	7
(France) PH Landry (United States) G Mangin	0	2	5

==== Section 4 ====
First round
3	(United Kingdom) Pat Hughes (United Kingdom) Fred Perry	6	6	6
(United Kingdom) Brian Helmore (United Kingdom) Douglas Hodges	2	4	4
(United Kingdom) Nigel Sharpe (United Kingdom) Patrick Wheatley	7	7	6
(United Kingdom) Edward Buzzard (United Kingdom) Brian Finnigan	5	5	3
(Czechoslovakia) Ferenc Maršálek (Czechoslovakia) Jiří Novotný	6	3	3	4
(Netherlands) Josef Knottenbelt (Netherlands) Ody Koopman	4	6	6	6
(Republic of Ireland) Edward McGuire (Republic of Ireland) Charles Scroope	7	6	2	6	2
(Republic of Ireland) George Lyttleton-Rogers (Japan) Hyotaro Sato	9	0	6	4	6
(India) Atri Madan Mohan (India) Ranbir Singh	0	1	4
(United Kingdom) Harry Lee (United Kingdom) John Olliff	6	6	6
(United Kingdom) Eric Peters (United Kingdom) Roy Poland	6	6	6
Q	(United Kingdom) Lionel Alderson (United Kingdom) Graham Mathieson	1	3	2
(Poland) Ignacy Tłoczyński (United States) Watson Washburn	2	6	4	4
(South Africa) Norman Farquharson (South Africa) Vernon Kirby	6	2	6	6
(New Zealand) Cam Malfroy (United Kingdom) Frank Wilde	5	6	12	4	6
(United Kingdom) Ted Avory (United Kingdom) Keats Lester	7	3	10	6	4

Second round
3	(United Kingdom) P Hughes (United Kingdom) F Perry	6	6	6
(United Kingdom) N Sharpe (United Kingdom) P Wheatley	4	4	4
(Netherlands) J Knottenbelt (Netherlands) O Koopman	6	6	4	6	3
(Republic of Ireland) G Lyttleton-Rogers (Japan) H Sato	8	3	6	1	6
(United Kingdom) H Lee (United Kingdom) J Olliff	4	6	6	4	7
(United Kingdom) E Peters (United Kingdom) R Poland	6	2	0	6	5
(South Africa) N Farquharson (South Africa) V Kirby	3	2	6	6	6
(New Zealand) C Malfroy (United Kingdom) F Wilde	6	6	3	4	2

Third round
3	(United Kingdom) P Hughes (United Kingdom) F Perry	6	6	4	7
(Republic of Ireland) G Lyttleton-Rogers (Japan) H Sato	3	4	6	5
(United Kingdom) H Lee (United Kingdom) J Olliff	5	6	4	6	4
(South Africa) N Farquharson (South Africa) V Kirby	7	4	6	3	6

Quarterfinals
3	(United Kingdom) P Hughes (United Kingdom) F Perry	4	6	6	1	9
(South Africa) N Farquharson (South Africa) V Kirby	6	4	2	6	7
