= 1931 Wimbledon Championships – Women's doubles =

Women's doubles
- 1931 Wimbledon Championships

Final
- Champions: (United Kingdom) Phyllis Mudford (United Kingdom) Dorothy Shepherd-Barron
- Runners-up: (France) Doris Metaxa (Belgium) Josane Sigart
- Score: 3–6, 6–3, 6–4

Details
- Draw: 48 (5Q)
- Seeds: 4

Events
Singles	men	women		boys	girls
Doubles	men	women	mixed	boys	girls
- Wimbledon Championships

Elizabeth Ryan and Helen Wills Moody were the defending champions, but did not participate.

Phyllis Mudford and Dorothy Shepherd-Barron defeated Doris Metaxa and Josane Sigart in the final, 3–6, 6–3, 6–4 to win the ladies' doubles tennis title at the 1931 Wimbledon Championships.

== Seeds ==
1. (United Kingdom) Eileen Fearnley-Whittingstall / (United States) Betty Nuthall (semifinals)
2. (Germany) Cilly Aussem / (Germany) Hilde Krahwinkel (second round)
3. (United Kingdom) Peggy Michell / (United Kingdom) Phoebe Watson (third round)
4. (France) Doris Metaxa / (Belgium) Josane Sigart (final)

Click on the seed number of a player to go to their draw section.

== Draw ==
Key

- Q = Qualifier
- WC = Wild card
- LL = Lucky loser
- Alt = Alternate
- ITF = ITF entry
- PR = Protected ranking
- SR = Special ranking
- SE = Special exempt
- JE = Junior exempt
- JR = Junior Accelerator Programme entrant
- CO = College Accelerator Programme entrant
- NG = Next Gen Accelerator Program entrant
- w/o = Walkover
- r = Retired
- d = Defaulted

=== Finals ===
Quarterfinals
1	(United Kingdom) Eileen Fearnley-Whittingstall (United Kingdom) Betty Nuthall	3	7	6
(United States) Anna Harper (United States) Marjorie Van Ryn	6	5	3
4	(France) Doris Metaxa (Belgium) Josane Sigart	7	6
(United Kingdom) Joan Strawson (United Kingdom) Billie Yorke	5	0
(United Kingdom) Evelyn Dearman (United Kingdom) Olga Webb	1	2
(United Kingdom) Phyllis Mudford (United Kingdom) Dorothy Shepherd-Barron	6	6
(United Kingdom) Kitty Godfree (United Kingdom) Dorothy Round	6	6
(United Kingdom) Elsie Pittman (United Kingdom) Joan Ridley	2	1

Semifinals
1	(United Kingdom) Eileen Fearnley-Whittingstall (United Kingdom) Betty Nuthall	6	6	4
4	(France) Doris Metaxa (Belgium) Josane Sigart	4	8	6
(United Kingdom) Phyllis Mudford (United Kingdom) Dorothy Shepherd-Barron	7	3	6
(United Kingdom) Kitty Godfree (United Kingdom) Dorothy Round	5	6	3

Final
4	(France) Doris Metaxa (Belgium) Josane Sigart	6	3	4
(United Kingdom) Phyllis Mudford (United Kingdom) Dorothy Shepherd-Barron	3	6	6

=== Top half ===
==== Section 1 ====
First round

Second round
1	(United Kingdom) Eileen Fearnley-Whittingstall (United Kingdom) Betty Nuthall	6	6
(United Kingdom) Janet Dudley-Cox (United Kingdom) Gladys Seel	3	1
(United Kingdom) Phyllis Satterthwaite (United Kingdom) MA Thomas	7	6
(Netherlands) Mence Dros-Canters (France) Simonne Mathieu	5	0
(United Kingdom) Nancy Lyle (United Kingdom) Margaret Stocks	7	6
Mrs JC Bell (United Kingdom) Kathleen Bridge	5	2
(United Kingdom) Dorothy Alexander (United Kingdom) R Watson	4	3
(United States) Anna Harper (United States) Marjorie Van Ryn	6	6

Third round
1	(United Kingdom) E Fearnley-Whittingstall (United Kingdom) B Nuthall	6	7
(United Kingdom) P Satterthwaite (United Kingdom) MA Thomas	4	5
(United Kingdom) N Lyle (United Kingdom) M Stocks	6	1	3
(United States) A Harper (United States) M Van Ryn	3	6	6

Quarterfinals
1	(United Kingdom) E Fearnley-Whittingstall (United Kingdom) B Nuthall	3	7	6
(United States) A Harper (United States) M Van Ryn	6	5	3

The nationality of Mrs JC Bell is unknown.

==== Section 2 ====
First round
4	(France) Doris Metaxa (Belgium) Josane Sigart	5	8	6
(United Kingdom) Ermyntrude Harvey (United Kingdom) Mary McIlquham	7	6	0
(United Kingdom) Betty Dix (United Kingdom) Elsa Haylock	6	6
Q	(United Kingdom) J Lawson (United Kingdom) Mrs R Stephens	4	2
(France) Ida Adamoff (France) Arlette Neufeld	2	1
(United Kingdom) Mary Heeley (United Kingdom) Freda James	6	6
(United Kingdom) Freda Scott (United Kingdom) Mrs P Thomas	6	6
(France) Jacqueline Gallay (France) Violette Gallay	3	3
(United Kingdom) JL Colegate (United Kingdom) CJ Tyrrell	4	4
(United Kingdom) Cecily Marriott (United Kingdom) Madge Slaney	6	6
(United Kingdom) Mrs Bruce-May (United Kingdom) Enid Clarke	6	6
(United Kingdom) Dorothy Anderson (United Kingdom) Jeanette Morfey	4	2
(United Kingdom) KEC Lewis (United Kingdom) Betty Uber	7	6
(Egypt) E Alexandroff (Germany) Anne Peitz	5	4
(United Kingdom) Effie Hemmant (United Kingdom) Madge List	4	4
(United Kingdom) Joan Strawson (United Kingdom) Billie Yorke	6	6

Second round
4	(France) D Metaxa (Belgium) J Sigart	8	6
(United Kingdom) M Dix (United Kingdom) E Haylock	6	2
(United Kingdom) M Heeley (United Kingdom) W James	6	6
(United Kingdom) F Scott (United Kingdom) Mrs P Thomas	3	0
(United Kingdom) C Marriott (United Kingdom) M Slaney	1	6
(United Kingdom) Mrs Bruce-May (United Kingdom) E Clarke	6	8
(United Kingdom) KEC Lewis (United Kingdom) E Uber	2	6	5
(United Kingdom) J Strawson (United Kingdom) A Yorke	6	4	7

Third round
4	(France) D Metaxa (Belgium) J Sigart	8	3	6
(United Kingdom) M Heeley (United Kingdom) W James	6	6	3
(United Kingdom) Mrs Bruce-May (United Kingdom) E Clarke	0	10
(United Kingdom) J Strawson (United Kingdom) A Yorke	6	12

Quarterfinals
4	(France) D Metaxa (Belgium) J Sigart	7	6
(United Kingdom) J Strawson (United Kingdom) A Yorke	5	0

=== Bottom half ===
==== Section 3 ====
First round
2	(Germany) Cilly Aussem (Germany) Hilde Krahwinkel
(France) Rosie Berthet (Spain) Bella Pons	w/o
(Greece) Helene Nicolopoulos (Switzerland) Lolette Payot	6	6
Q	(United Kingdom) Doris Eastley (United Kingdom) Andree Lucas	3	4
(United Kingdom) Evelyn Dearman (United Kingdom) Olga Webb	7	4	6
(United Kingdom) Enid Broadbridge (United Kingdom) Davinia Townsend	5	6	0
(United Kingdom) Gwen Sterry (United Kingdom) Naomi Trentham	1	8	6
(United Kingdom) Winifred Beamish (United Kingdom) Dorothy Jameson	6	6	3
Q	(United Kingdom) Mary Hardwick (United Kingdom) Sheila Hewitt	1	4
(United Kingdom) Helen Burr (United Kingdom) Helen Dyson	6	6
(United Kingdom) Phyllis Mudford (United Kingdom) Dorothy Shepherd-Barron	6	9
LL	(United Kingdom) Joan Ingram (United Kingdom) Peggy Pleydell-Bouverie	0	7
Q	(United Kingdom) Margery Elton (United Kingdom) Mildred Nonweiler	3	6	6
(United Kingdom) Mie Johnstone (United Kingdom) Lucy Pennycuick	6	3	4
(United Kingdom) Dorothy Hill (United Kingdom) Joan Lycett	6	3	6
(United Kingdom) Beatrice Feltham (United Kingdom) Sybil Johnson	3	6	3

Second round
2	(Germany) C Aussem (Germany) H Krahwinkel	6	4	4
(Greece) H Nicolopoulos (Switzerland) L Payot	3	6	6
(United Kingdom) E Dearman (United Kingdom) O Webb	6	6
(United Kingdom) G Sterry (United Kingdom) N Trentham	2	4
(United Kingdom) H Burr (United Kingdom) H Dyson	3	7
(United Kingdom) P Mudford (United Kingdom) D Shepherd-Barron	6	9
Q	(United Kingdom) M Elton (United Kingdom) M Nonweiler	5	4
(United Kingdom) D Hill (United Kingdom) J Lycett	7	6

Third round
(Greece) H Nicolopoulos (Switzerland) L Payot	6	3	7
(United Kingdom) E Dearman (United Kingdom) O Webb	3	6	9
(United Kingdom) P Mudford (United Kingdom) D Shepherd-Barron	6	6
(United Kingdom) D Hill (United Kingdom) J Lycett	4	3

Quarterfinals
(United Kingdom) E Dearman (United Kingdom) O Webb	1	2
(United Kingdom) P Mudford (United Kingdom) D Shepherd-Barron	6	6

==== Section 4 ====
First round

Second round
3	(United Kingdom) Peggy Michell (United Kingdom) Phoebe Watson	6	6
(United Kingdom) Gethyn Harry (United Kingdom) JF Harry	3	4
(United Kingdom) Kitty Godfree (United Kingdom) Dorothy Round	6	6
(France) Jacqueline Goldschmidt (United Kingdom) Agnes Tuckey	0	1
(United Kingdom) Elsie Pittman (United Kingdom) Joan Ridley	6	6
(Poland) Jadwiga Jędrzejowska (United States) Marjorie Sachs	2	3
Q	(France) Elizabeth Macready (United Kingdom) Christabel Wheatcroft	4	6	6
(United Kingdom) Vera Montgomery (United Kingdom) Mrs WT Tucker	6	2	1

Third round
3	(United Kingdom) M Michell (United Kingdom) P Watson	4	4
(United Kingdom) K Godfree (United Kingdom) D Round	6	6
(United Kingdom) E Pittman (United Kingdom) J Ridley	6	6
Q	(France) E Macready (United Kingdom) C Wheatcroft	3	2

Quarterfinals
(United Kingdom) K Godfree (United Kingdom) D Round	6	6
(United Kingdom) E Pittman (United Kingdom) J Ridley	2	1
