= 1931 French Championships – Men's singles =

Men's singles
- 1931 French Championships

Final
- Champion: (France) Jean Borotra
- Runner-up: (France) Christian Boussus
- Score: 2–6, 6–4, 7–5, 6–4

Details
- Draw: 89
- Seeds: 16

Events
Singles	men	women
Doubles	men	women
- French Championships

First-seeded Jean Borotra defeated Christian Boussus 2–6, 6–4, 7–5, 6–4 in the final to win the men's singles tennis title at the 1931 French Championships.

== Seeds ==
The seeded players are listed below. Jean Borotra is the champion; others show the round in which they were eliminated.

1. (France) Jean Borotra (champion)
2. (United States) George Lott (quarterfinals)
3. (France) Christian Boussus (finalist)
4. (United Kingdom) Bunny Austin (third round)
5. (United States) John Van Ryn (quarterfinals)
6. (United Kingdom) Fred J. Perry (fourth round)
7. (South Africa) Vernon Kirby (fourth round)
8. (Republic of Ireland) George Lyttleton-Rogers (third round)
9. (South Africa) Louis Raymond (third round)
10. (United Kingdom) Patrick Hughes (semifinals)
11. (Italy) Giorgio de Stefani (quarterfinals)
12. (Czechoslovakia) Roderich Menzel (fourth round)
13. (Japan) Hyotaro Sato (fourth round)
14. (Hungary) Béla von Kehrling (third round)
15. (France) Emmanuel Du Plaix (third round)
16. (Austria) Hermann Artens (fourth round)

== Draw ==
=== Key ===
- Q = Qualifier
- WC = Wild card
- LL = Lucky loser
- r = Retired

=== Finals ===
Quarterfinals
1	(France) Jean Borotra	6	6	6
(France) Benny Berthet	2	3	1
(Japan) Jiro Sato	8	1	2	6	6
5	(United States) John Van Ryn	6	6	6	4	3
11	(Italy) Giorgio de Stefani	4	3	6	6	7
3	(France) Christian Boussus	6	6	3	2	9
10	(United Kingdom) Patrick Hughes	3	4	6	6	6
2	(United States) George Lott	6	6	2	2	4

Semifinals
1	(France) Jean Borotra	10	2	5	6	6
(Japan) Jiro Sato	8	6	7	1	2
3	(France) Christian Boussus	6	4	6	6
10	(United Kingdom) Patrick Hughes	1	6	2	3

Final
1	(France) Jean Borotra	2	6	7	6
3	(France) Christian Boussus	6	4	5	4

=== Earlier rounds ===
==== Section 1 ====
First round

Second round
1	(France) Borotra	6	6	6
(Annam (French protectorate)) Van Chim	4	3	3
(United Kingdom) Collins	6	6	4	6
(France) Rimet	4	3	6	2
16	(Austria) Artens	8	6	2	0	6
(Chile) Torralva-Ponsa	6	1	6	6	4
(Germany) Haensch	4	6	2	4
(France) George	6	1	6	6

Third round
1	(France) Borotra	6	7	8
(United Kingdom) Collins	4	5	6
16	(Austria) Artens	3	6	2	6	8
(France) George	6	0	6	1	6

Fourth round
1	(France) Borotra	6	7	6	6
16	(Austria) Artens	8	5	0	4

==== Section 2 ====
First round

Second round
8	(Republic of Ireland) Rogers Lyttelton	13	6	6
(France) Augustin	11	1	1
(France) Lesueur	6	7	6
(Russia) Rodzianko	2	5	4
9	(South Africa) Raymond	6	4	6	6
(France) Samazeuilh	1	6	3	1
(Italy) Del Bono	3	2	3
(France) Berthet	6	6	6

Third round
8	(Republic of Ireland) Rogers Lyttelton
(France) Lesueur
9	(South Africa) Raymond	5	6	6	4	4
(France) Berthet	7	4	3	6	6

Fourth round
(France) Lesueur	1	4	6	6	4
(France) Berthet	6	6	1	1	6

==== Section 3 ====
First round
(Japan) J Sato	6	6	6
(Chile) Torralva-Ponsa	0	0	3
(Italy) De Martino	6	6	8
(France) Thurneyssen	3	4	6
(France) Gentien	6	6	6
(South Africa) Lowe	3	3	0
(France) Grandguillot	6	6	6
(France) Danet	2	1	1

Second round
4	(United Kingdom) Austin	6	6	6
(France) Laurent	1	1	4
(Germany) Zander
(France) Glasser
(Japan) J Sato	6	6	6
(Italy) De Martino	0	0	3
(France) Gentien	4	4	6	6	6
(France) Grandguillot	6	6	2	1	2

Third round
4	(United Kingdom) Austin
(Germany) Zander
(Japan) J Sato	6	6	9
(France) Gentien	0	1	7

Fourth round
(Germany) Zander	2	3	6
(Japan) J Sato	6	6	8

==== Section 4 ====
First round
5	(United States) Van Ryn	8	6	6
(France) Vieillard	6	3	3
(France) Martin-Legeay
(Annam (French protectorate)) Van Giao
(Hungary) Gabrowitz	6	6	6
(France) Siguier	1	0	4
(France) Merlin	4	6	6	6
(Romania) Mishu	6	3	2	1
12	(Czechoslovakia) Menzel	9	6	6
(France) De Macedo	7	4	3
(France) Gerbault	6	6	4	2	1
(France) Leven	3	1	6	6	1r
(France) Rodel	6	6	6
(United Kingdom) Hillyard	4	2	0
(Egypt) Wahid	5	4	4
(France) Bernard	7	6	6

Second round
5	(United States) Van Ryn	6	6	7
(France) Martin-Legeay	3	2	5
(Hungary) Gabrowitz	3	1	9	6
(France) Merlin	6	6	7	8
12	(Czechoslovakia) Menzel	6	6	6
(France) Gerbault	3	1	3
(France) Rodel	6	1	6	r
(France) Bernard	4	6	8

Third round
5	(United States) Van Ryn	4	8	6	6
(France) Merlin	6	6	1	2
12	(Czechoslovakia) Menzel	6	6	6
(France) Bernard	4	2	2

Fourth round
5	(United States) Van Ryn	6	3	6	6
12	(Czechoslovakia) Menzel	2	6	1	2

==== Section 5 ====
First round
(Austria) Salm	1	5	2
(Monaco) Gallèpe	6	7	6
(Japan) Kawachi	6	4	6	6
(France) Landry	3	6	1	0
(France) Arago	3	9	5	3
(Switzerland) Aeschliman	6	7	7	6
(France) Terrier	5	3	5
11	(Italy) de Stefani	7	6	7
(Egypt) Shukry	1	1	1
(France) Bernard	6	6	6
(France) Barrelet De Ricou
(Germany) Kleinschroth
(Kingdom of Yugoslavia) Schäffer
(France) Goldschmidt
(France) Geraud
6	(United Kingdom) Perry

Second round
(Monaco) Gallèpe	2	4	4
(Japan) Kawachi	6	6	6
(Switzerland) Aeschliman	4	1	3
11	(Italy) de Stefani	6	6	6
(France) Bernard	6	5	6	6	6
(France) Barrelet De Ricou	2	7	8	2	2
(France) Goldschmidt	0	3	3
6	(United Kingdom) Perry	6	6	6

Third round
(Japan) Kawachi	3	1	2
11	(Italy) de Stefani	6	6	6
(France) Bernard	4	1	4
6	(United Kingdom) Perry	6	6	6

Fourth round
11	(Italy) de Stefani	6	6	5	7
6	(United Kingdom) Perry	3	4	7	5

==== Section 6 ====
First round
(Czechoslovakia) Novotný	6	3	4	2
(France) De Buzelet	4	6	6	6
(France) Combemale	2	2	4
13	(Japan) H Sato	6	6	6
(United Kingdom) Olliff	6	6	6
(France) Bonte	0	0	1
(France) Albarran
14	(Hungary) Von Kehrling
(India) Singh	0	0	2
(France) Aron	6	6	6

Second round
(France) De Buzelet	2	3	9	4
13	(Japan) H Sato	6	6	7	6
(United Kingdom) Olliff	6	6	1	0	6
14	(Hungary) Von Kehrling	4	2	6	6	8
(France) Aron
(South Africa) Farquharson
Ward
3	(France) Boussus

Third round
13	(Japan) H Sato	6	6	1	6
14	(Hungary) Von Kehrling	3	4	6	1
(South Africa) Farquharson	2	2	6	3
3	(France) Boussus	6	6	2	6

Fourth round
13	(Japan) H Sato	6	4	6	3	4
3	(France) Boussus	4	6	1	6	6

==== Section 7 ====
First round

Second round
(Switzerland) Ellmer	0	6	2
(France) Féret	6	8	6
(France) Joba	0	0	2
10	(United Kingdom) Hughes	6	6	6
(France) Aslangul	2	6	0	5
(Italy) de Minerbi	6	2	6	7
(Switzerland) Chiesa
7	(South Africa) Kirby

Third round
(France) Féret	6	10	6	5	1
10	(United Kingdom) Hughes	8	8	2	7	6
(Italy) de Minerbi	6	4	1	7	1
7	(South Africa) Kirby	2	6	6	5	6

Fourth round
10	(United Kingdom) Hughes	6	6	6
7	(South Africa) Kirby	1	4	2

==== Section 8 ====
First round

Second round
(France) Guillemot	7	4	4	3
(Germany) von Cramm	5	6	6	6
(Kingdom of Yugoslavia) Kukuljević
15	(France) Du Plaix
(France) Magaloff	6	8	4	0	3
(United Kingdom) Kingsley	3	6	6	6	6
(France) Piel	1	2	7
2	(United States) Lott	6	6	9

Third round
(Germany) von Cramm	8	3	4	6	6
15	(France) Du Plaix	6	6	6	1	4
(United Kingdom) Kingsley	0	1	4
2	(United States) Lott	6	6	6

Fourth round
(Germany) von Cramm	3	1	0
2	(United States) Lott	6	6	6

Preceded by 1931 Australian Championships – Men's singles	Grand Slam men's singles	Succeeded by 1931 Wimbledon Championships – Men's singles
