= 1931 Wimbledon Championships – Men's singles =

Men's singles
- 1931 Wimbledon Championships

Final
- Champion: (United States) Sidney Wood
- Runner-up: (United States) Frank Shields
- Score: walkover

Details
- Draw: 128 (10Q)
- Seeds: 8

Events
Singles	men	women		boys	girls
Doubles	men	women	mixed	boys	girls
- Wimbledon Championships

Sidney Wood was declared winner of the title by default over Frank Shields in capturing the gentlemen's singles tennis title at the 1931 Wimbledon Championships. Shields withdrew due to a knee injury sustained during his semi-final match against Jean Borotra. This made Wood the only player in the title's history to win without having to compete in the final. Bill Tilden was the defending champion, but did not compete.

== Seeds ==
1. (France) Jean Borotra (semifinals)
2. (France) Henri Cochet (first round)
3. (United States) Frank Shields (final)
4. (France) Christian Boussus (fourth round)
5. (United Kingdom) Fred Perry (semifinals)
6. (United Kingdom) Bunny Austin (quarterfinals)
7. (United States) Sidney Wood (champion)
8. (Japan) Jiro Sato (quarterfinals)

Click on the seed number of a player to go to their draw section.

== Draw ==
Key

- Q = Qualifier
- WC = Wild card
- LL = Lucky loser
- Alt = Alternate
- ITF = ITF entry
- PR = Protected ranking
- SR = Special ranking
- SE = Special exempt
- JE = Junior exempt
- JR = Junior Accelerator Programme entrant
- CO = College Accelerator Programme entrant
- NG = Next Gen Accelerator Program entrant
- w/o = Walkover
- r = Retired
- d = Defaulted

=== Finals ===
Quarterfinals
(United Kingdom) Pat Hughes	6	4	3	1
7	(United States) Sidney Wood	4	6	6	6
(United States) John Van Ryn	4	6	5
5	(United Kingdom) Fred Perry	6	8	7
1	(France) Jean Borotra	6	6	4	6
8	(Japan) Jiro Sato	2	3	6	4
3	(United States) Frank Shields	6	2	5	7	6
6	(United Kingdom) Bunny Austin	3	6	7	5	1

Semifinals
7	(United States) Sidney Wood	4	6	6	6
5	(United Kingdom) Fred Perry	6	2	4	2
1	(France) Jean Borotra	5	6	4	4
3	(United States) Frank Shields	7	3	6	6

Final
7	(United States) Sidney Wood
3	(United States) Frank Shields	w/o

=== Top half ===
==== Section 1 ====
First round
2	(France) Henri Cochet	1	3	2
(United Kingdom) Nigel Sharpe	6	6	6
(Republic of Ireland) Henry Purcell	6	6	9
Q	(United Kingdom) Errol Whitehouse	2	1	7
Q	(United Kingdom) Eric Attewell	3	0	1
(United Kingdom) Patrick Wheatley	6	6	6
(France) Pierre Goldschmidt	8	3	6	12	3
(United Kingdom) Jimmy Nuthall	6	6	2	14	6
(United Kingdom) Frank Wilde	6	6	2	6
(United Kingdom) Colin Gregory	3	3	6	2
(United Kingdom) Pat Hughes	6	6	6
(United Kingdom) Philip Glover	1	4	3
(Czechoslovakia) Ladislav Hecht	7	6	6	7
(United Kingdom) Orson Wright	5	8	3	5
(Argentina) Lucilo del Castillo	6	6	6
(United Kingdom) Freddie Della Porta	3	4	3

Second round
(United Kingdom) N Sharpe	6	6	6
(Republic of Ireland) H Purcell	0	3	2
(United Kingdom) P Wheatley	5	7	6	6
(United Kingdom) J Nuthall	7	5	2	2
(United Kingdom) C Gregory	6	6	2	3	2
(United Kingdom) P Hughes	3	1	6	6	6
(Czechoslovakia) L Hecht	5	4	7	6	2
(Argentina) L del Castillo	7	6	5	2	6

Third round
(United Kingdom) N Sharpe	6	7	6
(United Kingdom) P Wheatley	1	5	4
(United Kingdom) P Hughes	6	6	6
(Argentina) L del Castillo	4	2	2

Fourth round
(United Kingdom) N Sharpe	6	2	4	3
(United Kingdom) P Hughes	4	6	6	6

==== Section 2 ====
First round
7	(United States) Sidney Wood	6	6	6
(India) Ranbir Singh	3	4	3
(United Kingdom) JH Frowen	6	6	4	5
(United Kingdom) Tony Crossley	1	8	6	7
(Spain) Enrique Maier	9	6	5	4	6
(South Africa) Norman Farquharson	7	3	7	6	4
(United Kingdom) William Powell	6	6	6
(Denmark) Bent Panker	3	4	3
(United Kingdom) Victor Cazalet	3	7	1	4
Q	(United Kingdom) Colin Ritchie	6	5	6	6
(Switzerland) Edward Flury	6	4	1	6	2
(Netherlands) Ody Koopman	0	6	6	2	6
(Republic of Ireland) Noel Holmes	2	6	1	4
(United Kingdom) Stan Harris	6	4	6	6
(New Zealand) Cam Malfroy
(Soviet Union) Sergei Rodzianko	w/o

Second round
7	(United States) S Wood	6	6	6
(United Kingdom) A Crossley	3	1	2
(Spain) E Maier	6	5	6	1	8
(United Kingdom) W Powell	4	7	2	6	6
Q	(United Kingdom) C Ritchie	6	6	3	3	3
(Netherlands) O Koopman	4	2	6	6	6
(United Kingdom) S Harris	4	1	5
(New Zealand) C Malfroy	6	6	7

Third round
7	(United States) S Wood	8	6	6
(Spain) E Maier	6	3	2
(Netherlands) O Koopman	5	3	4
(New Zealand) C Malfroy	7	6	6

Fourth round
7	(United States) S Wood	6	10	10	6
(New Zealand) C Malfroy	3	12	8	4

==== Section 3 ====
First round
4	(France) Christian Boussus	7	6	8
(South Africa) Louis Raymond	5	0	6
(United Kingdom) Harry Lewis-Barclay	2	3	6	6	7
(United Kingdom) Roy Poland	6	6	3	4	5
Q	(United Kingdom) Wilfred Freeman	7	4	4	7
(Argentina) Andrés Sissener	5	6	6	9
(India) Athar-Ali Fyzee	0	0	4
(Japan) Minoru Kawachi	6	6	6
(United Kingdom) Jack Lysaght	6	6	6	3	3
(United Kingdom) David Williams	1	4	8	6	6
(United States) Watson Washburn	3	2	4
(Austria) Franz Matejka	6	6	6
(France) André Merlin	2	7	6	6
(Monaco) Vladimir Landau	6	5	3	2
(United States) John Van Ryn	6	6	6
(Kingdom of Yugoslavia) Franjo Schaeffer	0	2	1

Second round
4	(France) C Boussus	6	6	6
(United Kingdom) H Lewis-Barclay	3	1	3
(Argentina) A Sissener	2	0	1
(Japan) M Kawachi	6	6	6
(United Kingdom) D Williams	1	8	2
(Austria) F-W Matejka	6	10	6
(France) A Merlin	2	4	1
(United States) J Van Ryn	6	6	6

Third round
4	(France) C Boussus	6	6	6
(Japan) M Kawachi	3	3	4
(Austria) F-W Matejka	3	6	1	4
(United States) J Van Ryn	6	3	6	6

Fourth round
4	(France) C Boussus	2	6	2	1
(United States) J Van Ryn	6	1	6	6

==== Section 4 ====
First round
5	(United Kingdom) Fred Perry	6	6	6
Q	(United Kingdom) James Cummins	1	3	3
(Japan) Iwao Aoki	6	6	6
(France) Emmanuel du Plaix	3	3	3
(United Kingdom) Ted Avory	7	4	8	5	6
(Czechoslovakia) Ferenc Maršálek	5	6	6	7	1
(United Kingdom) George Godsell	1	5	3
(France) Antoine Gentien	6	7	6
(French Indochina) Nguyen Van Chim	w/o
(United Kingdom) Charles Kingsley
(United Kingdom) Dickie Ritchie	6	8	6
(India) Hira-Lal Soni	2	6	4
(Republic of Ireland) Charles Scroope	6	6	8
Q	(United Kingdom) Wilfred Smith	3	1	6
(Hungary) Béla von Kehrling	8	1	2	2
(Germany) Gottfried von Cramm	6	6	6	6

Second round
5	(United Kingdom) F Perry	7	6	6
(Japan) I Aoki	5	2	3
(United Kingdom) E Avory	6	3	2	1
(France) A Gentien	1	6	6	6
(United Kingdom) C Kingsley	4	4	6	6	6
(United Kingdom) R Ritchie	6	6	3	4	4
(Republic of Ireland) C Scroope	1	6	5	4
(Germany) G von Cramm	6	2	7	6

Third round
5	(United Kingdom) F Perry	6	6	8
(France) A Gentien	2	3	6
(United Kingdom) C Kingsley	5	4	2
(Germany) G von Cramm	7	6	6

Fourth round
5	(United Kingdom) F Perry	7	6	6
(Germany) G von Cramm	5	2	4

=== Bottom half ===
==== Section 5 ====
First round
1	(France) Jean Borotra	8	4	8	6
(United Kingdom) Arthur Smith	6	6	6	1
Q	(United States) Bernard Law	5	5	5
(United Kingdom) Alan Brown	7	7	7
Q	(United Kingdom) Will Legg
(French Indochina) Huynh Van Giao	w/o
(Japan) Ryuki Miki	6	6	6
(India) Syed Mohammad Hadi	3	4	2
(United Kingdom) Noel Turnbull	6	2	6	3	3
(Austria) Hermann Artens	2	6	4	6	6
(Czechoslovakia) Jiří Novotný	1	4	0
(United Kingdom) Guy Cooper	6	6	6
(United Kingdom) Oswald Jameson	6	6	6
(United Kingdom) Billy Collins	3	4	2
(Poland) Ignacy Tłoczyński	6	6	6
Q	(United Kingdom) Paul Partridge	2	1	1

Second round
1	(France) J Borotra	1	6	6	8
(United Kingdom) A Brown	6	4	1	6
Q	(United Kingdom) W Legg	7	2	6
(Japan) T Miki	9	6	8
(Austria) H Artens	9	6	6
(United Kingdom) G Cooper	7	2	3
(United Kingdom) O Jameson	7	4	4	4
(Poland) I Tłoczyński	5	6	6	6

Third round
1	(France) J Borotra	6	6	6
(Japan) T Miki	4	1	2
(Austria) H Artens	6	6	4	6
(Poland) I Tłoczyński	3	2	6	4

Fourth round
1	(France) J Borotra	6	6	6
(Austria) H Artens	4	2	3

==== Section 6 ====
First round
8	(Japan) Jiro Sato	6	6	6
(South Africa) Vernon Kirby	3	2	4
(Republic of Ireland) George Lyttleton-Rogers	0	8	6	6
(United States) Gregory Mangin	6	6	3	3
(United Kingdom) Norman Latchford	1	0	2
(India) Atri Madan Mohan	6	6	6
(United Kingdom) Kenneth Gandar-Dower	7	6	5	1
(Argentina) Ronaldo Boyd	9	2	7	6
(United Kingdom) Arthur Vinall	6	11	6
(United Kingdom) Geoffrey de Ste. Croix	3	9	4
Q	(United Kingdom) Max Callendar	2	6	2	6	1
(United Kingdom) Harry Lee	6	3	6	4	6
(United States) George Lott	3	6	6	6
(France) Benny Berthet	6	3	0	2
(United Kingdom) Henry Burrows	3	2	2
(France) Pierre Henri Landry	6	6	6

Second round
8	(Japan) J Sato	4	7	6	6
(Republic of Ireland) G Lyttleton-Rogers	6	5	3	2
(India) AM Mohan	6	6	6
(Argentina) R Boyd	1	2	1
(United Kingdom) A Vinall	5	3	3
(United Kingdom) H Lee	7	6	6
(United States) G Lott	6	11	6
(France) PH Landry	4	9	2

Third round
8	(Japan) J Sato	6	6	6
(India) AM Mohan	3	2	3
(United Kingdom) H Lee	7	7	7
(United States) G Lott	5	5	5

Fourth round
8	(Japan) J Sato	8	6	6
(United Kingdom) H Lee	6	4	3

==== Section 7 ====
First round
3	(United States) Frank Shields	6	6	6
(South Africa) Pat Spence	1	1	2
(United Kingdom) Jimmy Reddall	4	3	4
(United Kingdom) Herman David	6	6	6
(Egypt) Jacques Grandguillot	4	5	6	6	7
(Netherlands) Josef Knottenbelt	6	7	3	4	9
(Germany) Eberhard Nourney	6	6	6
(Denmark) Helge Plougmann	2	1	4
(Argentina) Adriano Zappa	2	2	7	6	1
(United Kingdom) Brian Gilbert	6	6	5	3	6
(United Kingdom) John Pennycuick	6	6	3	1
(France) Jean Lesueur	8	3	6	6
(United Kingdom) GR Ashton	6	6	0	0
(United Kingdom) John Olliff	8	1	6	6
(United Kingdom) Raymond Tuckey
(United Kingdom) Donald Greig	w/o

Second round
3	(United States) F Shields	2	6	6	6
(United Kingdom) H David	6	0	3	4
(Netherlands) J Knottenbelt	8	6	0	9
(Germany) E Nourney	10	2	6	11
(United Kingdom) B Gilbert	1	6	3	2
(France) J Lesueur	6	4	6	6
(United Kingdom) J Olliff	7	8	6	6
(United Kingdom) R Tuckey	5	10	2	4

Third round
3	(United States) F Shields	6	6	6
(Germany) E Nourney	1	1	2
(France) J Lesueur	2	4	5
(United Kingdom) J Olliff	6	6	7

Fourth round
3	(United States) F Shields	6	6	6
(United Kingdom) J Olliff	2	0	2

==== Section 8 ====
First round
6	(United Kingdom) Bunny Austin	6	6	6
(Czechoslovakia) Josef Maleček	3	1	4
(Japan) Hyotaro Sato
(Romania) Nicolas Magaloff	w/o
(United Kingdom) Keats Lester	9	4	6	5	3
(France) Jacques Brugnon	7	6	4	7	6
(United Kingdom) Eric Peters
(France) Raymond Rodel	w/o
(United Kingdom) Bob Tinkler	7	6	8
(India) Janmeja Charanjiva	5	4	6
(Kingdom of Yugoslavia) Franjo Kukuljević	6	0	3	6	7
(United Kingdom) Edward Buzzard	4	6	6	3	5
(Republic of Ireland) Edward McGuire	6	2	6	0
(United Kingdom) Teddy Higgs	4	6	3	0^{r}
(Germany) Heinrich Kleinschroth	3	2	0^{r}
(United Kingdom) Ian Collins	6	6	0

Second round
6	(United Kingdom) H Austin	6	6	6
(Japan) H Sato	1	3	0
(France) J Brugnon	6	8	6
(United Kingdom) E Peters	3	6	2
(United Kingdom) R Tinkler	10	1	6	6
(Kingdom of Yugoslavia) F Kukuljević	8	6	4	4
(Republic of Ireland) E McGuire	5	7	6	2	3
(United Kingdom) I Collins	7	5	3	6	6

Third round
6	(United Kingdom) H Austin	6	6	6
(France) J Brugnon	3	4	0
(United Kingdom) R Tinkler	6	1	3
(United Kingdom) I Collins	8	6	6

Fourth round
6	(United Kingdom) H Austin	6	6	6
(United Kingdom) I Collins	3	3	4

Preceded by 1931 French Championships	Grand Slams; Men's Singles	Succeeded by 1931 U.S. Championships
