= 1931 Wimbledon Championships =

- Date: 22 June – 4 July
- Edition: 51st
- Category: Grand Slam
- Surface: Grass
- Location: Church Road; SW19, Wimbledon, London, United Kingdom
- Venue: All England Lawn Tennis and Croquet Club

Champions

Men's singles
- (United States) Sidney Wood

Women's singles
- (Germany) Cilly Aussem

Men's doubles
- (United States) George Lott / (United States) John Van Ryn

Women's doubles
- (United Kingdom) Dorothy Shepherd-Barron / (United Kingdom) Phyllis Mudford

Mixed doubles
- (United States) George Lott / (United States) Anna Harper
| ← 1930 · | Wimbledon Championships | · 1932 → |

The 1931 Wimbledon Championships took place on the outdoor grass courts at the All England Lawn Tennis and Croquet Club in Wimbledon, London, United Kingdom. The tournament was held from Monday 22 June until Saturday 4 July 1931. It was the 51st staging of the Wimbledon Championships, and the third Grand Slam tennis event of 1931. Sidney Wood and Cilly Aussem won the singles titles.

== Finals ==
=== Men's singles ===
(United States) Sidney Wood defeated (United States) Frank Shields, walkover

=== Women's singles ===
(Germany) Cilly Aussem defeated (Germany) Hilde Krahwinkel, 6–2, 7–5

=== Men's doubles ===
(United States) George Lott / (United States) John Van Ryn defeated (France) Jacques Brugnon / (France) Henri Cochet, 6–2, 10–8, 9–11, 3–6, 6–3

=== Women's doubles ===
(United Kingdom) Dorothy Shepherd-Barron / (United Kingdom) Phyllis Mudford defeated (France) Doris Metaxa / (Belgium) Josane Sigart, 3–6, 6–3, 6–4

=== Mixed doubles ===
(United States) George Lott / (United States) Anna Harper defeated (United Kingdom) Ian Collins / (United Kingdom) Joan Ridley, 6–3, 1–6, 6–1

| Preceded by 1931 French Championships | Grand Slams | Succeeded by 1931 U.S. National Championships |
