= 1931 Wimbledon Championships – Women's singles =

Women's singles
- 1931 Wimbledon Championships

Final
- Champion: (Germany) Cilly Aussem
- Runner-up: (Germany) Hilde Krahwinkel
- Score: 6–2, 7–5

Details
- Draw: 96 (10Q)
- Seeds: 8

Events
Singles	men	women		boys	girls
Doubles	men	women	mixed	boys	girls
- Wimbledon Championships

Cilly Aussem defeated Hilde Krahwinkel in the final, 6–2, 7–5 to win the ladies' singles tennis title at the 1931 Wimbledon Championships.

Helen Moody was the defending champion, but did not participate.

== Seeds ==
1. (Germany) Cilly Aussem (champion)
2. (United Kingdom) Betty Nuthall (quarterfinals)
3. (France) Simonne Mathieu (semifinals)
4. (Germany) Hilde Krahwinkel (final)
5. (Spain) Lilí de Álvarez (third round)
6. (United States) Helen Jacobs (semifinals)
7. (United Kingdom) Phyllis Mudford (third round)
8. (United Kingdom) Eileen Fearnley-Whittingstall (fourth round)

Click on the seed number of a player to go to their draw section.

== Draw ==
Key

- Q = Qualifier
- WC = Wild card
- LL = Lucky loser
- Alt = Alternate
- ITF = ITF entry
- PR = Protected ranking
- SR = Special ranking
- SE = Special exempt
- JE = Junior exempt
- JR = Junior Accelerator Programme entrant
- CO = College Accelerator Programme entrant
- NG = Next Gen Accelerator Program entrant
- w/o = Walkover
- r = Retired
- d = Defaulted

=== Finals ===
Quarterfinals
1	(Germany) Cilly Aussem	2	6	6
(Switzerland) Lolette Payot	6	2	1
3	(France) Simonne Mathieu	1	6	7
(United Kingdom) Peggy Scriven	6	2	5
2	(United Kingdom) Betty Nuthall	2	3
6	(United States) Helen Jacobs	6	6
4	(Germany) Hilde Krahwinkel	7	6
(United Kingdom) Dorothy Round	5	3

Semifinals
1	(Germany) Cilly Aussem	6	2	6
3	(France) Simonne Mathieu	0	6	3
6	(United States) Helen Jacobs	8	6	4
4	(Germany) Hilde Krahwinkel	10	0	6

Final
1	(Germany) Cilly Aussem	6	7
4	(Germany) Hilde Krahwinkel	2	5

=== Top half ===
==== Section 1 ====
First round

Second round
1	(Germany) Cilly Aussem	6	6
(France) Jacqueline Goldschmidt	4	1
(United Kingdom) Gladys Seel	4	4
(Egypt) E Alexandroff	6	6
(France) Arlette Neufeld	4	6	7
(United Kingdom) Mrs P Thomas	6	3	5
(United Kingdom) Betty Soames	6	6
(United Kingdom) Joan Marshall	3	1

Third round
1	(Germany) C Aussem	6	6
(Egypt) E Alexandroff	2	3
(France) A Neufeld	6	6
(United Kingdom) B Soames	1	4

Fourth round
1	(Germany) C Aussem	6	6
(France) A Neufeld	0	2

==== Section 2 ====
First round

Second round
8	(United Kingdom) Eileen Fearnley-Whittingstall	6	6
Q	(United Kingdom) Mrs HA Lewis	1	2
(United Kingdom) Kathleen Bridge	3	4
(United Kingdom) Peggy Michell	6	6
(United Kingdom) Grace Vaughton	w/o
(United Kingdom) Freda Scott
(Switzerland) Lolette Payot	6	6
(United Kingdom) Margery Elton	4	2

Third round
8	(United Kingdom) E Fearnley-Whittingstall	6	6
(United Kingdom) M Michell	4	1
(United Kingdom) F Scott	4	4
(Switzerland) L Payot	6	6

Fourth round
8	(United Kingdom) E Fearnley-Whittingstall	2	2
(Switzerland) L Payot	6	6

==== Section 3 ====
First round
3	(France) Simonne Mathieu	6	7
(United Kingdom) Winifred Beamish	3	5
Q	(United Kingdom) Mrs R Stephens	1	2
(United Kingdom) Jeanette Morfey	6	6
(United Kingdom) Doris Eastley	4	6	4
(Germany) Edith Sander	6	4	6
Q	(United Kingdom) Helen Burr	0	6	2
(Greece) Helene Nicolopoulos	6	3	6
Q	(United Kingdom) Edie Rudd	4	6	0
(United Kingdom) Elsa Haylock	6	4	6
(United Kingdom) Enid Clarke	3	3
(United States) Marjorie Van Ryn	6	6
(United Kingdom) Freda James	6	7
(United Kingdom) Mary McIlquham	1	5
(United Kingdom) Naomi Trentham	6	6
(United Kingdom) Christabel Wheatcroft	3	2

Second round
3	(France) S Mathieu	6	6
(United Kingdom) J Morfey	2	4
(Germany) E Sander	3	2
(Greece) H Nicolopoulos	6	6
(United Kingdom) E Haylock	2	6	6
(United States) M Van Ryn	6	3	8
(United Kingdom) W James	1	6
(United Kingdom) N Trentham	6	8

Third round
3	(France) S Mathieu	6	6
(Greece) H Nicolopoulos	3	0
(United States) M Van Ryn	7	6
(United Kingdom) N Trentham	5	2

Fourth round
3	(France) S Mathieu	6	6
(United States) M Van Ryn	4	3

==== Section 4 ====
First round
7	(United Kingdom) Phyllis Mudford	6	6
(United Kingdom) Evelyn Dearman	0	2
(United Kingdom) Nancy Lyle	6	6
(United Kingdom) Dorothy Anderson	3	3
(United Kingdom) Betty Uber	3	2
(United Kingdom) Joan Ridley	6	6
(United Kingdom) Betty Dix	6	6
(United Kingdom) Enid Broadbridge	3	3
(United Kingdom) Dorothy Shepherd-Barron	6	6
Q	(United Kingdom) Joan Couchman	3	2
(United Kingdom) Mary Heeley	6	6
Q	(United Kingdom) Andree Lucas	2	4
(United Kingdom) Vera Montgomery	4	2
(United Kingdom) Ermyntrude Harvey	6	6
(Belgium) Josane Sigart	5	6	2
(United Kingdom) Peggy Scriven	7	0	6

Second round
7	(United Kingdom) P Mudford	6	6
(United Kingdom) N Lyle	3	1
(United Kingdom) J Ridley	6	6
(United Kingdom) B Dix	3	3
(United Kingdom) D Shepherd-Barron	5	5
(United Kingdom) M Heeley	7	7
(United Kingdom) E Harvey	7	4
(United Kingdom) M Scriven	9	6

Third round
7	(United Kingdom) P Mudford	8	6	4
(United Kingdom) J Ridley	10	1	6
(United Kingdom) M Heeley	4	6
(United Kingdom) M Scriven	6	8

Fourth round
(United Kingdom) J Ridley	1	4
(United Kingdom) M Scriven	6	6

=== Bottom half ===
==== Section 5 ====
First round
2	(United Kingdom) Betty Nuthall	6	6
(France) Rosie Berthet	0	2
(United Kingdom) Beatrice Feltham	6	6
(United Kingdom) Effie Hemmant	2	4
(Germany) Anne Peitz	6	6
(United Kingdom) Phyllis Satterthwaite	2	4
(United Kingdom) HM Brooke	2	8	7
(United Kingdom) R Watson	6	6	5
(United Kingdom) Vera Marshall	6	6
(France) Violette Gallay	4	2
(United Kingdom) MA Thomas	3	4
(United States) Anna Harper	6	6
(United Kingdom) Evelyn Goldsworth	0	8
(United Kingdom) Mildred Nonweiler	6	10
(United Kingdom) Olga Webb	2	6	6
(France) Jacqueline Gallay	6	4	1

Second round
2	(United Kingdom) B Nuthall	6	6
(United Kingdom) B Feltham	2	2
(Germany) A Peitz	6	1	6
(United Kingdom) HM Brooke	3	6	0
(United Kingdom) V Marshall	3	2
(United States) A Harper	6	6
(United Kingdom) M Nonweiler	3	13	5
(United Kingdom) O Webb	6	11	7

Third round
2	(United Kingdom) B Nuthall	4	6	6
(Germany) A Peitz	6	0	1
(United States) A Harper	6	6
(United Kingdom) O Webb	0	4

Fourth round
2	(United Kingdom) B Nuthall	6	6
(United States) A Harper	4	2

==== Section 6 ====
First round
6	(United States) Helen Jacobs
(Spain) Bella Pons	w/o
Q	(United Kingdom) Sheila Hewitt	2	1
(United Kingdom) Billie Yorke	6	6
(United Kingdom) Elsie Pittman	6	6
(United Kingdom) Gethyn Harry	1	2
(United Kingdom) J Lawson	4	6	6
(United Kingdom) Margaret Stocks	6	3	2
(Netherlands) Mence Dros-Canters	3	4
(United Kingdom) Ruth Kirk	6	6
(United Kingdom) Yvonne Law
(France) Edith Belliard	w/o
(United Kingdom) Kitty Godfree	2	6	6
(Poland) Jadwiga Jędrzejowska	6	4	3
Q	(Australia) Mrs AT Price	1	3
(France) Ida Adamoff	6	6

Second round
6	(United States) H Jacobs	6	7
(United Kingdom) A Yorke	2	5
(United Kingdom) E Pittman	6	6
(United Kingdom) J Lawson	0	4
(United Kingdom) R Kirk	6	5	7
(United Kingdom) Y Law	2	7	5
(United Kingdom) K Godfree	6	6
(France) I Adamoff	3	4

Third round
6	(United States) H Jacobs	6	6
(United Kingdom) E Pittman	3	4
(United Kingdom) R Kirk	2	0
(United Kingdom) K Godfree	6	6

Fourth round
6	(United States) H Jacobs	6	6
(United Kingdom) K Godfree	2	1

==== Section 7 ====
First round

Second round
4	(Germany) Hilde Krahwinkel	6	6
(United Kingdom) Madge Slaney	2	1
(United Kingdom) Davinia Townsend	5	5
(United Kingdom) Dorothy Jameson	7	7
(United Kingdom) Madge List	2	8
(France) Doris Metaxa	6	10
(United Kingdom) Gwen Sterry	6	6
(United Kingdom) Joan Strawson	2	4

Third round
4	(Germany) H Krahwinkel	6	6
(United Kingdom) D Jameson	3	4
(France) D Metaxa	5	6	3
(United Kingdom) G Sterry	7	4	6

Fourth round
4	(Germany) H Krahwinkel	8	6
(United Kingdom) G Sterry	6	0

==== Section 8 ====
First round

Second round
5	(Spain) Lilí de Álvarez	2	6	6
(United Kingdom) Joan Lycett	6	1	2
Q	(United Kingdom) Kay Stammers	0	4
(United Kingdom) Dorothy Round	6	6
(United Kingdom) Winifred Bower	0	6	3
(United Kingdom) Sybil Johnson	6	3	6
(United States) Marjorie Sachs	6	6
Q	(United Kingdom) Evelyn Perry	2	4

Third round
5	(Spain) E de Álvarez	3	3
(United Kingdom) D Round	6	6
(United Kingdom) S Johnson	6	3	7
(United States) M Sachs	2	6	5

Fourth round
(United Kingdom) D Round	6	6
(United Kingdom) S Johnson	0	1

Preceded by 1931 French Championships	Grand Slams; Women's Singles	Succeeded by 1931 U.S. National Championships
