= 1931 French Championships (tennis) =

- Date: 22–31 May 1931
- Edition: 36th
- Category: 7th Grand Slam (ITF)
- Surface: Clay
- Location: Paris (XVI^{e}), France
- Venue: Stade Roland Garros

Champions

Men's singles
- (France) Jean Borotra

Women's singles
- (Germany) Cilly Aussem

Men's doubles
- (United States) George Lott / (United States) John Van Ryn

Women's doubles
- (United Kingdom) Eileen Bennett Whittingstall / (United Kingdom) Betty Nuthall

Mixed doubles
- (United Kingdom) Betty Nuthall / (South Africa) Patrick Spence
← 1930 ·	French Championships	· 1932 →

The 1931 French Championships (now known as the French Open) was a tennis tournament that took place on the outdoor clay courts at the Stade Roland-Garros in Paris, France. The tournament ran from 22 May until 31 May. It was the 36th staging of the French Championships and the second Grand Slam tournament of the year. Jean Borotra and Cilly Aussem won the singles titles.

== Finals ==
=== Men's singles ===
(France) Jean Borotra defeated (France) Christian Boussus 2–6, 6–4, 7–5, 6–4

=== Women's singles ===
(Germany) Cilly Aussem defeated (United Kingdom) Betty Nuthall 8–6, 6–1

=== Men's doubles ===
(United States) George Lott / (United States) John Van Ryn defeated (South Africa) Vernon Kirby / (South Africa) Norman Farquharson 6–4, 6–3, 6–4

=== Women's doubles ===
(United Kingdom) Eileen Bennett Whittingstall / (United Kingdom) Betty Nuthall defeated (Germany) Cilly Aussem / (United States) Elizabeth Ryan 9–7, 6–2

=== Mixed doubles ===
(United Kingdom) Betty Nuthall / (South Africa) Patrick Spence defeated (United Kingdom) Dorothy Shepherd Barron / (United Kingdom) Bunny Austin 6–3, 5–7, 6–3

Preceded by 1931 Australian Championships	Grand Slams	Succeeded by 1931 Wimbledon Championships
