= 1931 French Championships – Women's singles =

Women's singles
- 1931 French Championships

Final
- Champion: (Germany) Cilly Aussem
- Runner-up: (United Kingdom) Betty Nuthall
- Score: 8–6, 6–1

Details
- Seeds: 8

Events
Singles	men	women
Doubles	men	women
- French Championships

Cilly Aussem defeated Betty Nuthall 8–6, 6–1 in the final to win the women's singles tennis title at the 1931 French Championships.

== Seeds ==
The seeded players are listed below. Cilly Aussem is the champion; others show the round in which they were eliminated.

1. (Germany) Cilly Aussem (champion)
2. (France) Simonne Mathieu (quarterfinals)
3. (United States) Helen Jacobs (quarterfinals)
4. (Spain) Lilly De Alvarez (semifinals)
5. (United States) Elizabeth Ryan (quarterfinals)
6. (United Kingdom) Betty Nuthall (finalist)
7. (Germany) Hilde Krahwinkel (semifinals)
8. (United Kingdom) Joan Ridley (third round)

== Draw ==
=== Key ===
- Q = Qualifier
- WC = Wild card
- LL = Lucky loser
- r = Retired

=== Finals ===
Quarterfinals
1	(Germany) Cilly Aussem	8	6
(Italy) Lucia Valerio	6	2
4	(Spain) Lilly De Alvarez	5	6	6
5	(United States) Elizabeth Ryan	7	3	4
6	(United Kingdom) Betty Nuthall	6	6
3	(United States) Helen Jacobs	3	2
7	(Germany) Hilde Krahwinkel	6	6
2	(France) Simonne Mathieu	4	3

Semifinals
1	(Germany) Cilly Aussem	6	7
4	(Spain) Lilly De Alvarez	0	5
6	(United Kingdom) Betty Nuthall	6	6
7	(Germany) Hilde Krahwinkel	1	2

Finals
1	(Germany) Cilly Aussem	8	6
6	(United Kingdom) Betty Nuthall	6	1

=== Earlier rounds ===
==== Section 1 ====
First round
(United Kingdom) Shepherd-Barron	4	3
(France) Rosambert	6	6
8	(United Kingdom) Ridley	6	6
(France) Charpenel	1	3
(France) Gallay	8	4
(United States) Burke	10	6
(France) Wyns-Speranza	2	3
(Italy) Valerio	6	6
(France) Gallay	6	0
Lowenthal	8	6

Second round
1	(Germany) Aussem	6	6
(France) Belliard	4	1
(France) Henrotin	6	1	6
(France) Rosambert	1	6	3
8	(United Kingdom) Ridley	6	6
(United States) Burke	0	3
(Italy) Valerio	6	6
Lowenthal	0	1

Third round
1	(Germany) Aussem	6	6	6
(France) Henrotin	8	2	4
8	(United Kingdom) Ridley	3	6	3
(Italy) Valerio	6	3	6

Quarterfinals
1	(Germany) Aussem	8	6
(Italy) Valerio	6	2

==== Section 2 ====
First round
4	(Spain) De Alvarez	6	6
(France) Marre	3	3
(France) Vlasto
(Spain) Pons
(United Kingdom) Satterthwaite
(France) Guillier
(Germany) Horn	5	7	8
(France) Anet	7	5	6
5	(United States) Ryan	6	6
(France) Bernard	2	2
(France) Vaussard	4	6	2
(Poland) Jędrzejowska	6	3	6
(United Kingdom) Whittingstall	7	4	6
(France) Charnelet	5	6	1
(Germany) Peitz	6	6
(France) Berthet	2	4

Second round
4	(Spain) De Alvarez	7	8
(Spain) Pons	5	6
(France) Guillier	6	6
(Germany) Horn	1	4
5	(United States) Ryan	2	9	6
(Poland) Jędrzejowska	6	7	3
(United Kingdom) Whittingstall	11	8	3
(Germany) Peitz	9	10	6

Third round
4	(Spain) De Alvarez	6	6
(France) Guillier	3	3
5	(United States) Ryan	1	6	6
(Germany) Peitz	6	3	1

Quarterfinals
4	(Spain) De Alvarez	5	6	6
5	(United States) Ryan	7	3	4

==== Section 3 ====
First round
(France) De Montebello	3	1
Hilleary	6	6
De Bruyn Kops
(France) Adamoff
(France) Lebesnerais	6	6
(United States) Barger Wallach	1	4
(France) Kleinadel	1	3
6	(United Kingdom) Nuthall	6	6
(France) Barbier	1	3
(Germany) Rost	6	6
(France) Metaxa	8	5	6
(Belgium) J. Sigart	6	7	3
(France) Macready	1	3
(Greece) Nicolopoulos	6	6
(France) Meunier	2	0
3	(United States) Jacobs	6	6

Second round
Hilleary	3	6	3
(France) Adamoff	6	4	6
(France) Lebesnerais	0	2
6	(United Kingdom) Nuthall	6	6
(Germany) Rost	2	3
(France) Metaxa	6	6
(Greece) Nicolopoulos	0	3
3	(United States) Jacobs	6	6

Third round
(France) Adamoff	2	3
6	(United Kingdom) Nuthall	6	6
(France) Metaxa	6	1	7
3	(United States) Jacobs	2	6	9

Quarterfinals
6	(United Kingdom) Nuthall	6	6
3	(United States) Jacobs	3	2

==== Section 4 ====
First round
(France) Goldschmidt	1	6	6
(United States) Gladman	6	3	0
(France) Peyre	4	2
(United Kingdom) Heeley	6	6
(France) Danet	1	0
(Italy) Riboli	6	6
(France) Neufeld	2	6	2
7	(Germany) Krahwinkel	6	1	6
(France) Row
(United Kingdom) Thomas
(France) Amaury	2	0
(Switzerland) Payot	6	6

Second round
(France) Goldschmidt	3	0
(United Kingdom) Heeley	6	6
(Italy) Riboli	3	1
7	(Germany) Krahwinkel	6	6
(United Kingdom) Thomas	2	2
(Switzerland) Payot	6	6
(France) Holzschuch	1	4
2	(France) Mathieu	6	6

Third round
(United Kingdom) Heeley	6	4	2
7	(Germany) Krahwinkel	3	6	6
(Switzerland) Payot	5	1
2	(France) Mathieu	7	6

Quarterfinals
7	(Germany) Krahwinkel	6	6
2	(France) Mathieu	4	3

Preceded by 1931 Australian Championships – Women's singles	Grand Slam women's singles	Succeeded by 1931 Wimbledon Championships – Women's singles
