= Edmund Owen Fearnley-Whittingstall =

English painter

Edmund Owen Fearnley-Whittingstall (1907-1971) was an English portrait painter. His works include portraits of John William Charles Wand, Bishop of Bath and Wells (hanging in the Bishop's Palace); Alice Mildred Cable, missionary, (in Cambridge University Library); Air Chief Marshal Sir Christopher Courtney (in the RAF Museum); and William Shepherd Morrison, a former speaker of the House of Commons, in the Palace of Westminster.

He was married in 1929 to tennis player Eileen Bennett Whittingstall and divorced in 1936.
