= Jean Lesueur (tennis) =

French tennis player

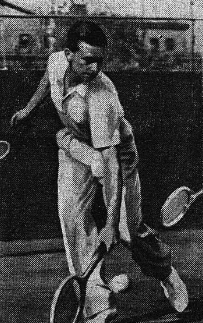
- Country (sports): France
- Born: 24 June 1910
- Died: 27 August 1969 (aged 59)
- Plays: Left-handed

Singles

Grand Slam singles results
- French Open: 4R (1931, 1937)
- Wimbledon: 3R (1931, 1936)

Jean Gustave Louis Lesueur (24 June 1910 – 27 August 1969) was a French tennis player.

A left-handed player from Dieppe, Lesueur was most active during the 1930s and won seven national titles.

Lesueur made the fourth round of the French Championships in both 1931 and 1937. His exit from the 1937 tournament was unusual in that he was forced to forfeit by the referee after chatting with his friends in the stands instead of arriving on court in time for his match against Bunny Austin.

In 1938 he featured in a Davis Cup tie against Germany in Berlin, where he and Yvon Petra lost a five set doubles rubber to Henner Henkel and Georg von Metaxa.

Lesueur was the father-in-law of French jazz musician Claude Bolling.

== See also ==
- List of France Davis Cup team representatives
