= Antoine Gentien =

French tennis player

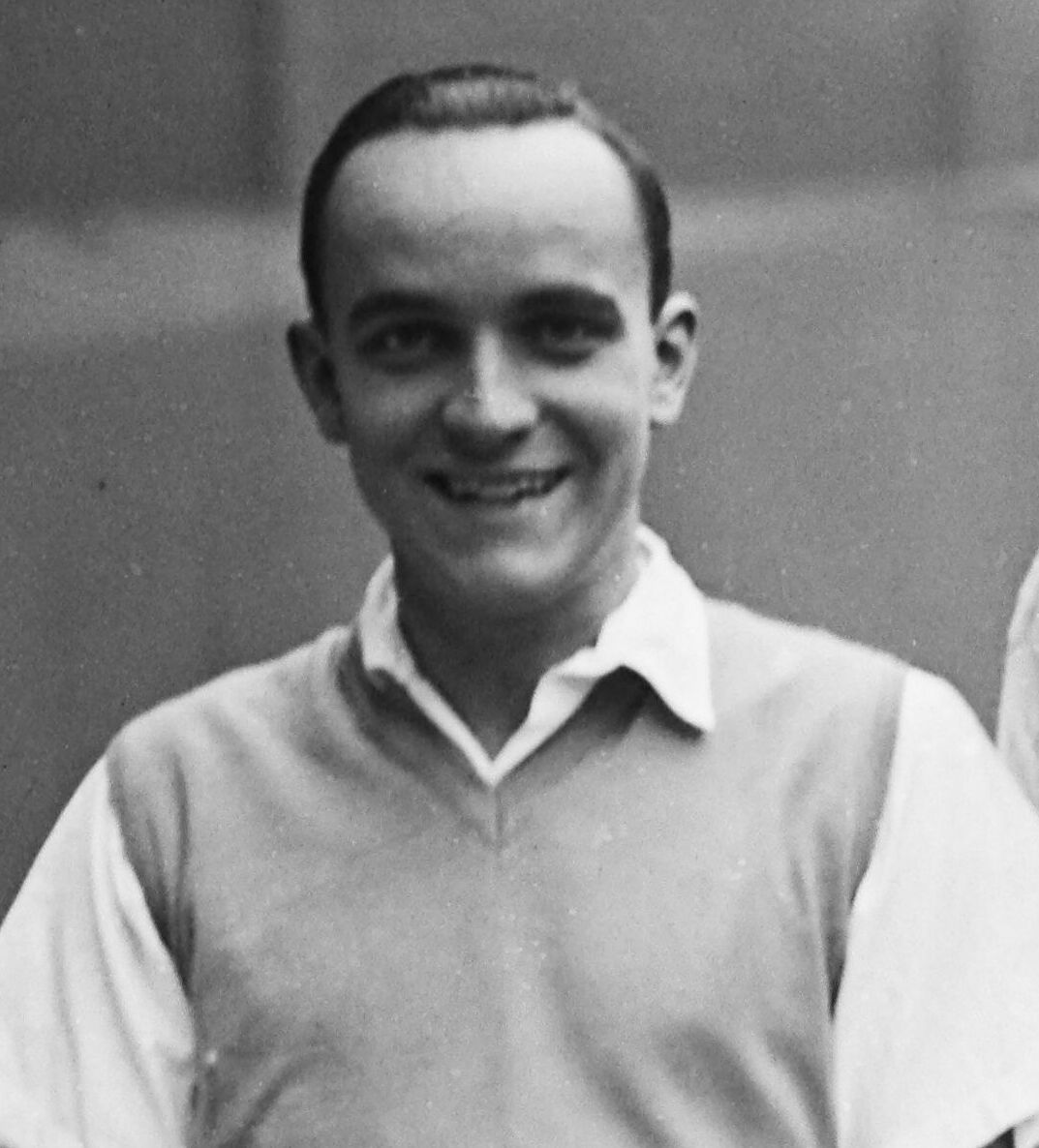
- Antoine Gentien (1930)
- Full name: Antoine "Coco" Gentien
- Country (sports): France
- Born: 13 June 1905 Paris, France
- Died: 2 September 1968 (aged 63) Paris, France
- Turned pro: 1921 (amateur tour)
- Retired: 1951

Singles

Grand Slam singles results
- French Open: QF (1927)
- Wimbledon: 3R (1931, 1932, 1933, 1935)

Doubles

Grand Slam doubles results
- Wimbledon: 3R (1931)

Grand Slam mixed doubles results
- Wimbledon: 3R (1932)

Antoine Gentien (13 June 1905 – 2 September 1968) was a French tennis player whose career lasted from 1921 to 1951.

He was the son of Antoinette Gillou and the nephew of Kate Gillou. Katie was four times French (closed) singles champion. Antoine was friends with Suzanne Lenglen. He won several tournaments in France, but at the French Championships his best result was reaching the quarterfinals in 1927. He made his Wimbledon debut in 1923 and lost in round one. Gentien made his debut at the French Championships in 1925 and lost in round two. He lost in round one at the French in 1926. In 1927 Gentien had one of the best wins of his career when he beat Jean Borotra at the French Championships, making the Bounding Basque run all over the court and lobbing Borotra if he came to the net. Gentien lost in the quarterfinals to Pat Spence. Gentien lost in round two of Wimbledon. At the first French Championships held at Roland Garros in 1928, Gentien lost in the last 16 to Jack Crawford. He lost in round one of Wimbledon. He lost early at Roland Garros and Wimbledon in 1929 and Roland Garros in 1930. He lost in round three of Roland Garros in 1931 and reached round three of Wimbledon, where Fred Perry beat him. Perry beat him in an early round at Roland Garros in 1932 and Sidney Wood beat him in round three at Wimbledon. In 1933, Gentien reached round three at Roland Garros (losing to Daniel Prenn) and Wimbledon (losing to Crawford). At Roland Garros 1934 Gentien lost in round three to Harry Hopman and at Wimbledon lost in round two to Roderich Menzel. At Roland Garros in 1935, Gentien lost in round two to Adrian Quist. At Wimbledon he lost in round three to Enrique Maier. Gentien lost in round one of the French Championships in 1936, but in 1937 reached the last 16 (losing to Christian Boussus). He continued playing at the French championships until 1950. Gentien had one of the longest spans ever in the French Open men's singles (Bernard Destremau had a 29-year span between 1934 and 1963).

== Bibliography ==
- Aventures d'un joueur de tennis (1953)
