= John Van Ryn =

American tennis player

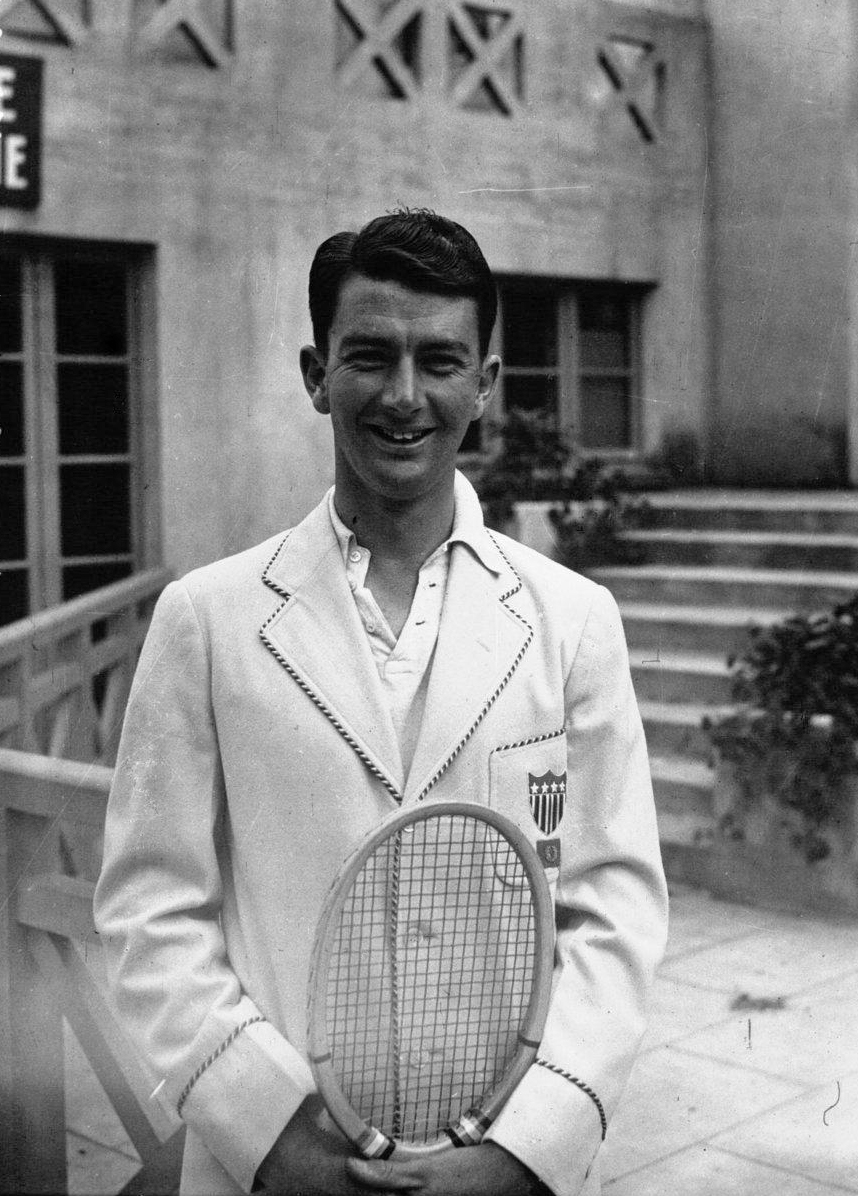
- Full name: John William Van Ryn
- Country (sports): United States
- Born: June 30, 1905 Newport News, Virginia, United States
- Died: August 7, 1999 (aged 94) Palm Beach, Florida, United States
- Turned pro: 1923 (amateur tour)
- Retired: 1945
- Plays: Right-handed (1-handed backhand)
- Int. Tennis HoF: 1963 (member page)

Singles
- Career record: 135-70
- Career titles: 10
- Highest ranking: No. 8 (1929, A. Wallis Myers)

Grand Slam singles results
- Australian Open: 2R (1933)
- French Open: QF (1931)
- Wimbledon: QF (1931)
- US Open: QF (1929, 1930, 1931, 1936, 1937)

Doubles

Grand Slam doubles results
- French Open: W (1931)
- Wimbledon: W (1929, 1930, 1931)
- US Open: W (1931, 1935)

Mixed doubles

Grand Slam mixed doubles results
- Wimbledon: 4R (1936)

John Van Ryn (June 30, 1905 – August 7, 1999) was an American tennis champion of the 1930s. He was primarily known as the doubles partner of Wilmer Allison.

Van Ryn won the Seabright Invitational in New Jersey in 1928, defeating Wilmer Allison in the final, Allison retiring at 10-10 in the fifth set. That same year he won the Pennsylvania Lawn Tennis Championships at the Merion Cricket club defeating Frank Shields in the final in three straight sets.

In 1929 he defeated Bill Tilden in the final of the Brooklyn Heights Casino Indoor Invitation in three straight sets.

In 1930 Van Ryn won the Mason & Dixon Tournament at The Greenbrier resort defeating Gregory Mangin in the quarterfinal in three straight sets, Frank Hunter in the semifinal in five sets, and Allison in the final in four sets.

He won the United North and South tournament at the Pinehurst Resort in 1931 defeating Clifford Sutter in the final in three straight sets. That same season he won the Brooklyn Heights Casino Indoor Invitation defeating Frank Shields in the final in three straight sets.

Van Ryn won the Men's Doubles at Wimbledon three straight years (1929–31). He took two of the titles with Wilmer Allison and won the third with George Lott. In 1931, he was also successful with Lott at the French Championships. He became the first male player to win the French, British and American doubles titles when he won the 1931 U.S. National Championships with Allison. Van Ryn had an excellent record when he competed for the United States in Davis Cup, winning 22 of 24 encounters in a period of eight years. He was inducted into the Tennis Hall of Fame in 1963.

On 22 October 1930 he married tennis player Midge Gladman.

== Grand Slam finals ==
=== Doubles (6 titles, 5 runners-up) ===
Result	Year	Championship	Surface	Partner	Opponents	Score
Win	1929	Wimbledon	Grass	(United States) Wilmer Allison	(United Kingdom) Ian Collins (United Kingdom) Colin Gregory	6–4, 5–7, 6–3, 10–12, 6–4
Win	1930	Wimbledon	Grass	(United States) Wilmer Allison	(United States) John Doeg (United States) George Lott	6–3, 6–3, 6–2
Loss	1930	US National Championships	Grass	(United States) Wilmer Allison	(United States) John Doeg (United States) George Lott	6–8, 3–6, 6–3, 15–13, 4–6
Win	1931	French Championships	Clay	(United States) George Lott	(South Africa) Vernon Kirby (South Africa) Norman Farquharson	6–4, 6–3, 6–4
Win	1931	Wimbledon	Grass	(United States) George Lott	(France) Jacques Brugnon (France) Henri Cochet	6–2, 10–8, 9–11, 3–6, 6–3
Win	1931	US National Championships	Grass	(United States) Wilmer Allison	(United States) Berkeley Bell (United States) Gregory Mangin	6–4, 6–3, 6–2
Loss	1932	US National Championships	Grass	(United States) Wilmer Allison	(Australia) Keith Gledhill (United States) Ellsworth Vines	4–6, 3–6, 2–6
Loss	1934	US National Championships	Grass	(United States) Wilmer Allison	(United States) George Lott (United States) Lester Stoefen	4–6, 7–9, 6–3, 4–6
Loss	1935	Wimbledon	Grass	(United States) Wilmer Allison	(Australia) Jack Crawford (Australia) Adrian Quist	3–6, 7–5, 2–6, 7–5, 5–7
Win	1935	US National Championships	Grass	(United States) Wilmer Allison	(United States) Don Budge (United States) Gene Mako	6–2, 6–3, 2–6, 3–6, 6–1
Loss	1936	US National Championships	Grass	(United States) Wilmer Allison	(United States) Don Budge (United States) Gene Mako	4–6, 2–6, 4–6
