= Betty Nuthall =

English tennis player (1911–1983)

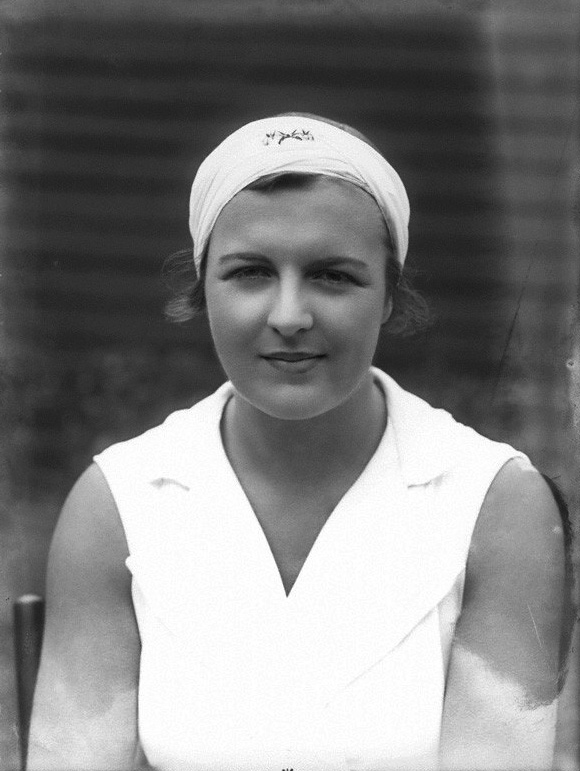
- Full name: Elizabeth May Nuthall Shoemaker
- Country (sports): United Kingdom
- Born: 23 May 1911 Surbiton, England
- Died: 8 November 1983 (aged 72) New York City, United States
- Plays: Right-handed
- Int. Tennis HoF: 1977 (member page)

Singles
- Highest ranking: No. 4 (1929)

Grand Slam singles results
- French Open: F (1931)
- Wimbledon: 4R (1933, 1937, 1938, 1946)
- US Open: W (1930)

Grand Slam doubles results
- French Open: W (1931)
- US Open: W (1930, 1931, 1933)

Grand Slam mixed doubles results
- French Open: W (1931, 1932)
- US Open: W (1929, 1931)

Team competitions
- Wightman Cup: (1928)

Betty May Nuthall Shoemaker (née Nuthall; 23 May 1911 – 8 November 1983) was an English tennis player. Known for her powerful forehand, according to Wallis Myers of The Daily Telegraph and the Daily Mail, Nuthall was ranked in the world's top 10 in 1927, 1929 through 1931, and 1933, reaching a career high of world no. 4 in 1929. In 1930, Nuthall won the women's singles title at the U.S. Championships.

== Early life ==
Betty Nuthall was born on 23 May 1911 in Surbiton and grew up in Richmond. She was the eldest child of Stuart Nuthall, who worked on the London and South Western Railway and later became a hotel proprietor, and his wife Mary, both of them keen tennis players.

== Career ==
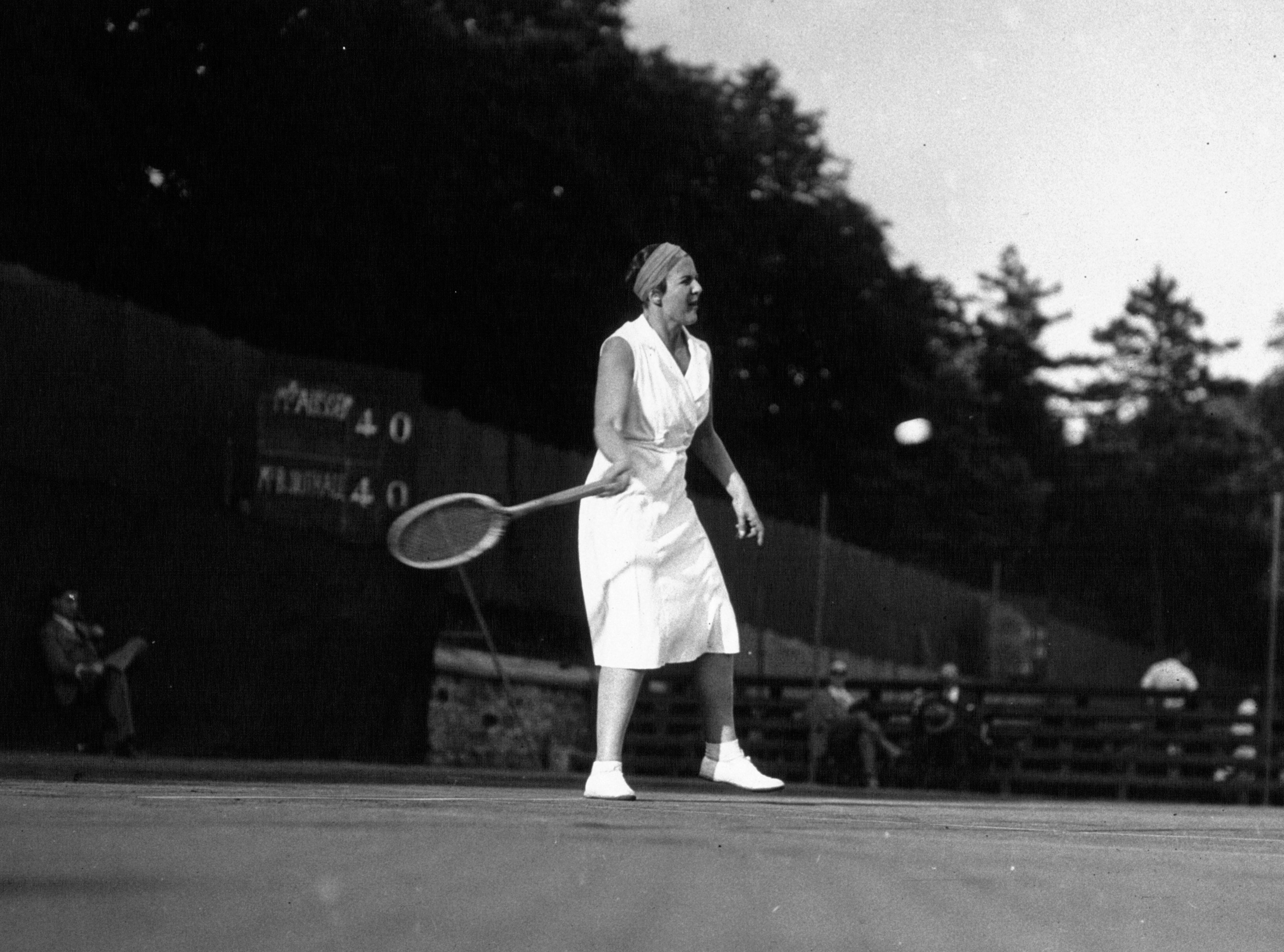
Betty Nuthall in 1932

Nuthall's father taught her tennis. She won the junior championships of Great Britain in 1924 (aged 13), 1925 and 1926.

In 1927 at the age of 16, Nuthall tied Elisabeth Moore as the then-youngest women's singles finalist ever at the U.S. National Championships. Nuthall lost the final to Helen Wills in straight sets while serving under-handed.

Also in 1927, Nuthall played on the British Wightman Cup team and defeated Helen Jacobs in her debut. She also represented Great Britain in the 1929 and 1931–34 Wightman Cup competitions.

In 1930, Nuthall became the first non-American since 1892 to win a women's singles title at the U.S. National Championships, defeating Anna McCune Harper in straight sets. She was the last British female player to win the title until Virginia Wade won in 1968. In 1931, she reached the singles final of the French International Championships but lost in two sets to top-seeded Cilly Aussem. Also in 1930, she won the mixed doubles with her recurring partner Pat Spence. Nuthall and he went for the British Hard Court Championships in April and were only eliminated in the final, while in May they won the mixed title at the French International Championships.

At the U.S. Championships in 1933, Nuthall won a quarterfinal versus Alice Marble 6–8, 6–0, 7–5 after being down two breaks of serve at 1–5 in the final set. In the semifinals versus Moody, Nuthall won the first set 6–2 in just 12 minutes, which was the first set Wills had lost at this tournament since 1926. Moody, however, turned around the match and won the last two sets 6–3, 6–2 despite losing her serve twice in the second set. Nuthall never again reached the quarterfinals of a Grand Slam singles tournament.

Nuthall won women's doubles titles at the 1930, 1931, and 1933 U.S. Championships and at the 1931 French Championships. She won mixed doubles championships at the 1929 and 1931 U.S. Championships and at the 1931 and 1932 French Championships.

Nuthall was inducted into the International Tennis Hall of Fame in 1977.

In 2025 the Museum of Richmond included her in their exhibition "Trailblazing Women – Richmond’s Sporting Superstars".

== Personal life ==
She and doubles partner Pat Spence were a couple off the court, and they won the French Open mixed doubles tournament in 1931. In 1954, she married Franklin Shoemaker, who died in 1982. On 8 November 1983, Nuthall died in New York City of a coronary arrest.

== Grand Slam finals ==
=== Singles: 3 (1 title, 2 runners-up) ===
Result	Year	Championship	Surface	Opponent	Score
Loss	1927	U.S. Championships	Grass	(United States) Helen Wills	1–6, 4–6
Win	1930	U.S. Championships	Grass	(United States) Anna McCune Harper	6–1, 6–4
Loss	1931	French Championships	Clay	(Weimar Republic) Cilly Aussem	6–8, 1–6

=== Doubles (4 titles, 2 runners-up) ===
Result	Year	Championship	Surface	Partner	Opponents	Score
Loss	1927	U.S. National Championships	Grass	(United Kingdom) Joan Fry	(United Kingdom) Kitty McKane (United Kingdom) Ermyntrude Harvey	1–6, 6–4, 4–6
Win	1930	U.S. National Championships	Grass	(United States) Sarah Palfrey	(United States) Edith Cross (United States) Anna McCune Harper	3–6, 6–3, 7–5
Win	1931	French Championships	Clay	(United Kingdom) Eileen Bennett Whittingstall	(Germany) Cilly Aussem (United States) Elizabeth Ryan	9–7, 6–2
Win	1931	U.S. National Championships	Grass	(United Kingdom) Eileen Bennett Whittingstall	(United States) Helen Jacobs (United Kingdom) Dorothy Round	6–2, 6–4
Loss	1932	French Championships	Clay	(United Kingdom) Eileen Bennett Whittingstall	(United States) Elizabeth Ryan (United States) Helen Wills	1–6, 3–6
Win	1933	U.S. National Championships	Grass	(United Kingdom) Freda James	(United States) Elizabeth Ryan (United States) Helen Wills	default

=== Mixed doubles (4 titles, 1 runner-up) ===
Result	Year	Championship	Surface	Partner	Opponents	Score
Win	1929	U.S. National Championships	Grass	(United States) George Lott	(United Kingdom) Phyllis Covell (United Kingdom) Bunny Austin	6–3, 6–3
Win	1931	French Championships	Clay	(South Africa) Patrick Spence	(United Kingdom) Dorothy Shepherd (United Kingdom) Bunny Austin	6–3, 5–7, 6–3
Win	1931	U.S. National Championships	Grass	(United States) George Lott	(United States) Anna McCune Harper (United States) Wilmer Allison	6–3, 6–3
Win	1932	French Championships	Clay	(United Kingdom) Fred Perry	(United States) Helen Wills (United States) Sidney Wood	6–4, 6–2
Loss	1933	French Championships	Grass	(United Kingdom) Fred Perry	(United Kingdom) Margaret Scriven (Australia) Jack Crawford	2–6, 3–6

== Grand Slam singles tournament timeline ==
Key
W	F	SF	QF	#R	RR	Q#	DNQ	A	NH

(W) winner; (F) finalist; (SF) semifinalist; (QF) quarterfinalist; (#R) rounds 4, 3, 2, 1; (RR) round-robin stage; (Q#) qualification round; (DNQ) did not qualify; (A) absent; (NH) not held; (SR) strike rate (events won / competed); (W–L) win–loss record.

Tournament	1926	1927	1928	1929	1930	1931	1932	1933	1934	1935	1936	1937	1938	1939	1940	1941 – 1944	1945	1946^{1}	Career SR
Australian Championships	A	A	A	A	A	A	A	A	A	A	A	A	A	A	A	NH	NH	A	0 / 0
French Championships	A	A	2R	A	A	F	SF	SF	3R	A	A	A	A	A	NH	R	A	A	0 / 5
Wimbledon	2R	QF	1R	3R	QF	QF	QF	4R	1R	A	2R	4R	4R	1R	NH	NH	NH	4R	0 / 14
U.S. Championships	A	F	A	QF	W	SF	A	SF	2R	A	A	A	A	3R	A	A	A	A	1 / 7
SR	0 / 1	0 / 2	0 / 2	0 / 2	1 / 2	0 / 3	0 / 2	0 / 3	0 / 3	0 / 0	0 / 1	0 / 1	0 / 1	0 / 2	0 / 0	0 / 0	0 / 0	0 / 1	1 / 26

R = tournament restricted to French nationals and held under German occupation.

^{1}In 1946, the French Championships were held after Wimbledon.

== See also ==
- Performance timelines for all female tennis players since 1978 who reached at least one Grand Slam final
