= Eileen Bennett Whittingstall =

British tennis player (1907–1979?)

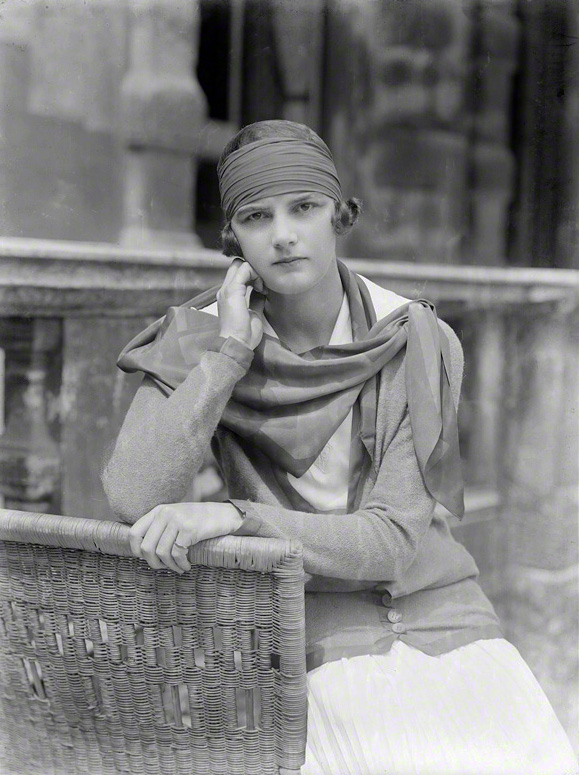
- Bennett in 1928
- Full name: Eileen Viviyen Bennett Fearnley-Whittingstall
- Country (sports): United Kingdom
- Born: 16 July 1907 Paddington, London, England
- Died: 18 August 1979 (aged 72)

Singles
- Highest ranking: No.3 (1931)

Grand Slam singles results
- French Open: F (1928)
- Wimbledon: QF (1928, 1932)
- US Open: F (1931)

Doubles

Grand Slam doubles results
- French Open: W (1928, 1931)
- Wimbledon: F (1928)
- US Open: W (1931)

Grand Slam mixed doubles results
- French Open: W (1928, 1929)
- Wimbledon: SF (1930, 1932)
- US Open: W (1927)

Eileen Bennett Whittingstall (née Bennett; 16 July 1907 – c. 18 August 1979, full name Eileen Viviyen Bennett Fearnley-Whittingstall) was a tennis player from the United Kingdom who won six Grand Slam doubles titles from 1927 to 1931.

== Career ==
Although most of her success was in women's doubles or mixed doubles, Whittingstall reached the singles final of the 1928 French Championships and the 1931 US Championships. She lost both of these finals in straight sets to Helen Wills Moody. She twice won the women's doubles title at the French Championships: in 1928 with Phoebe Holcroft Watson and in 1931 with Betty Nuthall. Whittingstall and Nuthall lost the 1932 final to the team of Moody and Elizabeth Ryan.

Whittingstall teamed with Ermyntrude Harvey to reach the 1928 women's doubles final at Wimbledon, losing to the team of Watson and Peggy Saunders 2–6, 3–6. She also teamed with Shoemaker to win the 1931 women's doubles title at the U.S. Championships, defeating Helen Jacobs and Dorothy Round Little in the final in two sets. Whittingstall twice partnered with Henri Cochet to win the mixed doubles title at the French Championships. In both 1928 and 1929, they defeated the team of Moody and Frank Hunter in the final. Whittingstall and Cochet lost the 1930 French final to the team of Bill Tilden and Cilly Aussem.

Whittingstall and Cochet won the mixed doubles title at the 1927 US Championships, defeating Hazel Wightman and René Lacoste in the final.

According to A. Wallis Myers of The Daily Telegraph and the Daily Mail, Whittingstall was ranked in the world top 10 in 1928, 1929, 1931, and 1932, reaching a career high of World No. 3 in those rankings in 1931.

Bennett is credited with first wearing an above-the-knee form of divided skirt for competitive tennis.

== Personal life ==
She was married on 19 November 1929 to Edmund Fearnley-Whittingstall, a painter, and divorced in 1936. She married Marcus Marsh, a racehorse trainer, on 28 September 1936 and gave birth to a daughter on 7 March 1937. She was divorced from Mr Marsh in early 1947 and married Mr Geoffrey Ackroyd in June 1947. She married for a fourth and final time in June 1957 to Mr Carl Vyvyan Forslind who outlived her.

== Grand Slam finals ==
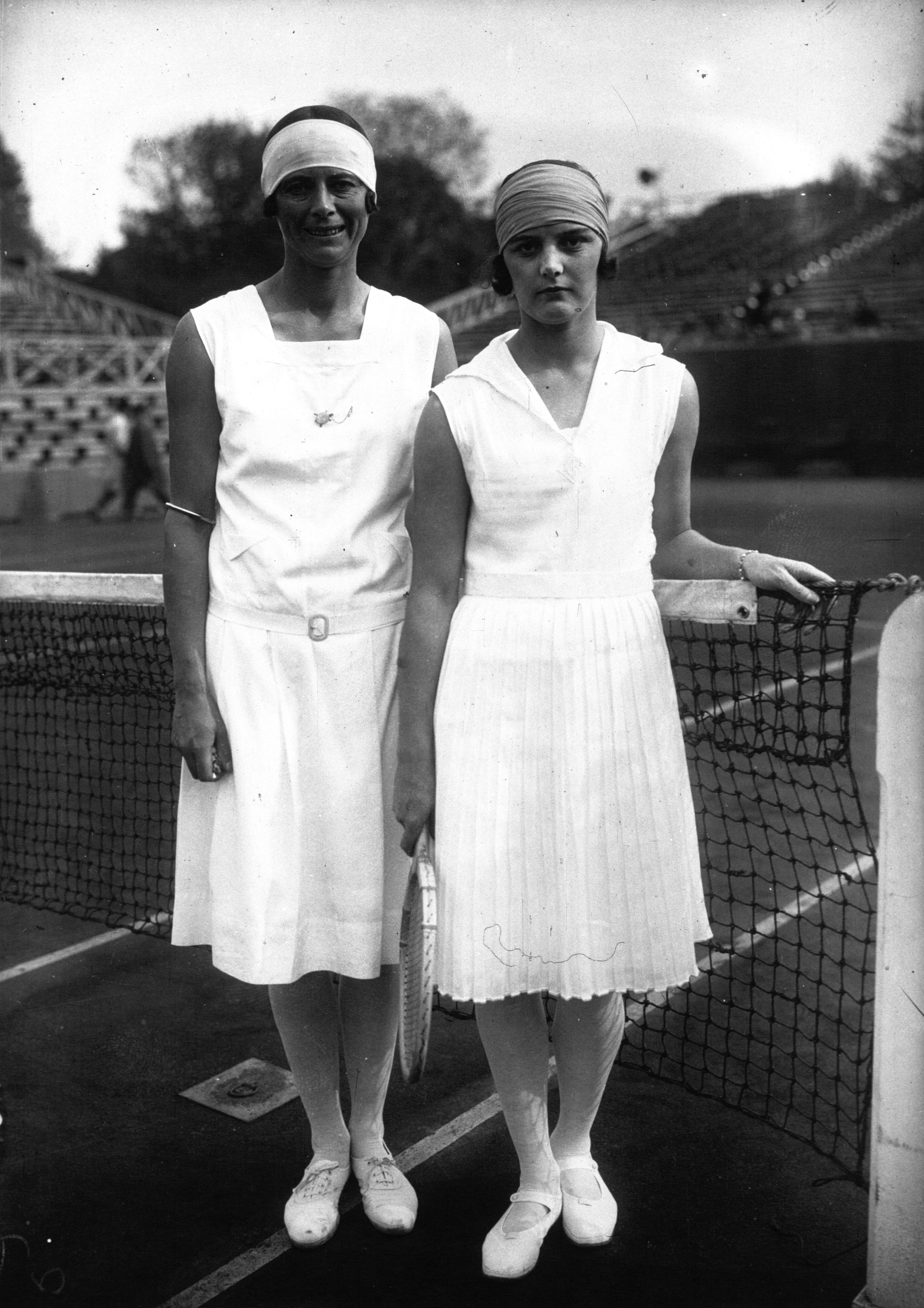
Bennett (r) and Phoebe Holcroft Watson at the 1928 French Championships

=== Singles (2 runners-up) ===
Result	Year	Championship	Surface	Opponent	Score
Loss	1928	French Championships	Clay	(United States) Helen Wills	1–6, 2–6
Loss	1931	U.S. National Championships	Grass	(United States) Helen Wills	4–6, 1–6

=== Doubles (3 titles, 2 runners-up) ===
Result	Year	Championship	Surface	Partner	Opponents	Score
Win	1928	French Championships	Clay	(United Kingdom) Phoebe Holcroft	(France) Suzanne Devé (France) Sylvie Jung	6–0, 6–2
Loss	1928	Wimbledon	Grass	(United Kingdom) Ermyntrude Harvey	(United Kingdom) Peggy Saunders (United Kingdom) Phoebe Holcroft	2–6, 3–6
Win	1931	French Championships	Clay	(United Kingdom) Betty Nuthall	(Germany) Cilly Aussem (United States) Elizabeth Ryan	9–7, 6–2
Win	1931	U.S. National Championships	Grass	(United Kingdom) Betty Nuthall	(United States) Helen Jacobs (United Kingdom) Dorothy Round	6–2, 6–4
Loss	1932	French Championships	Clay	(United Kingdom) Betty Nuthall	(United States) Elizabeth Ryan (United States) Helen Wills	1–6, 3–6

=== Mixed doubles (3 titles, 1 runner-up) ===
Result	Year	Championship	Surface	Partner	Opponents	Score
Win	1927	U.S. National Championships	Grass	(France) Henri Cochet	(United States) Hazel Hotchkiss Wightman (France) René Lacoste	6–2, 6–0, 6–3
Win	1928	French Championships	Clay	(France) Henri Cochet	(United States) Helen Wills (United States) Frank Hunter	6–2, 6–3
Win	1929	French Championships	Clay	(France) Henri Cochet	(United States) Helen Wills (United States) Frank Hunter	6–3, 6–2
Loss	1930	French Championships	Clay	(France) Henri Cochet	(Germany) Cilly Aussem (United States) Bill Tilden	4–6, 4–6

== Grand Slam singles tournament timeline ==
Key
W	F	SF	QF	#R	RR	Q#	DNQ	A	NH

(W) winner; (F) finalist; (SF) semifinalist; (QF) quarterfinalist; (#R) rounds 4, 3, 2, 1; (RR) round-robin stage; (Q#) qualification round; (DNQ) did not qualify; (A) absent; (NH) not held; (SR) strike rate (events won / competed); (W–L) win–loss record.

Tournament	1925	1926	1927	1928	1929	1930	1931	1932	1933	1934	1935	Career SR
Australian Championships	A	A	A	A	A	A	A	A	A	A	A	0 / 0
French Championships	A	A	SF	F	SF	2R	2R	QF	QF	A	A	0 / 7
Wimbledon	1R	2R	3R	QF	4R	2R	4R	QF	4R	2R	4R	0 / 11
US Championships	A	A	3R	A	A	A	F	A	A	A	A	0 / 2
SR	0 / 1	0 / 1	0 / 3	0 / 2	0 / 2	0 / 2	0 / 3	0 / 2	0 / 2	0 / 1	0 / 1	0 / 20

== See also ==
- Performance timelines for all female tennis players since 1978 who reached at least one Grand Slam final
