= Cilly Aussem =

German tennis player

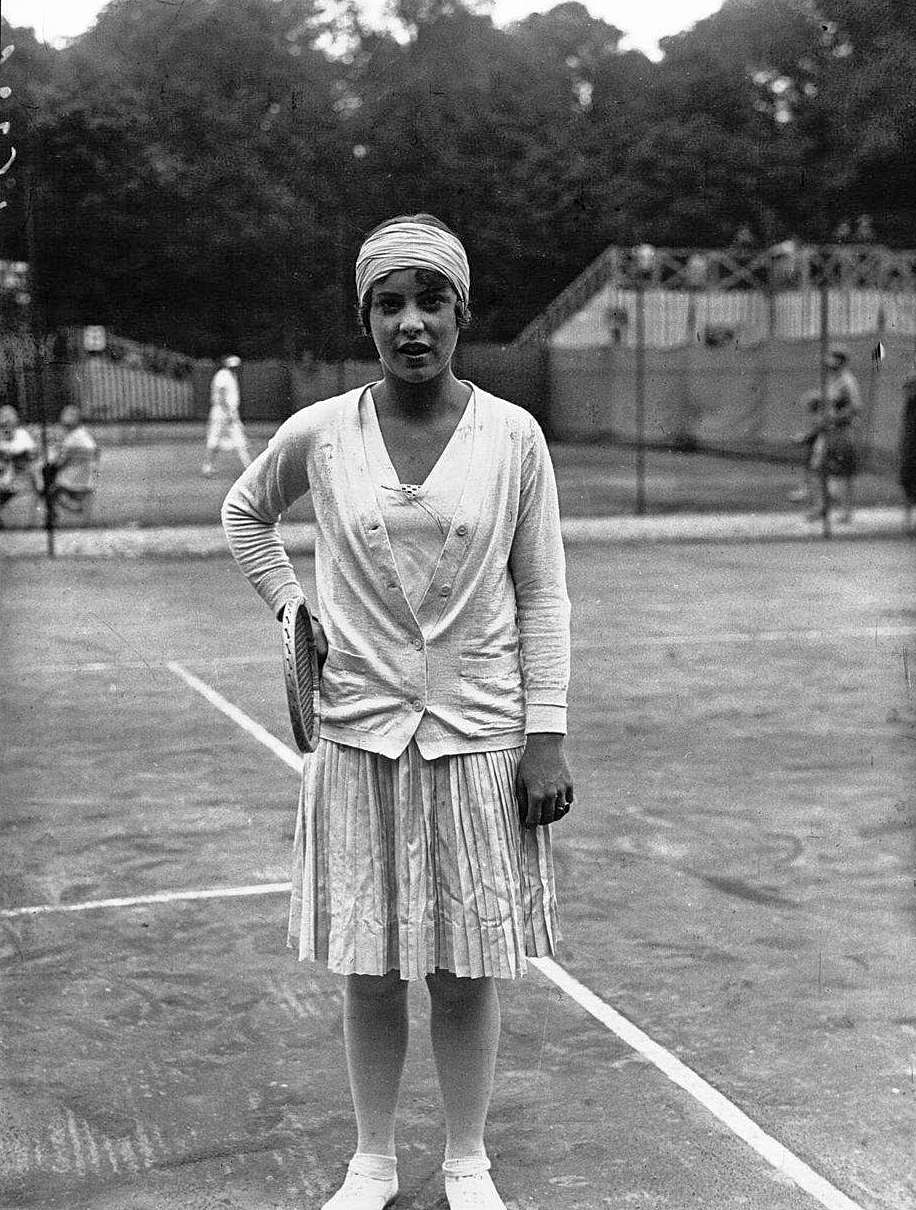
- Aussem in 1927
- Full name: Cäcilia Edith Aussem
- Country (sports): Weimar Republic; Nazi Germany (1933–1934)
- Born: 4 January 1909 Cologne, German Empire
- Died: 22 March 1963 (aged 54) Portofino. Italy
- Retired: 1935
- Plays: Right-handed (one-handed backhand)

Singles
- Career record: 240–71 (77.2%)
- Career titles: 45
- Highest ranking: No. 2 (1930)

Grand Slam singles results
- French Open: W (1931)
- Wimbledon: W (1931)

Doubles

Grand Slam doubles results
- French Open: F (1931)

Grand Slam mixed doubles results
- French Open: W (1930)
- Wimbledon: QF (1930)

Cilly Aussem (German pronunciation: [ˈʦiːli̯ə ˈaʊ̯sm]; 4 January 1909 – 22 March 1963) was a German tennis player.

She was the first German, male or female, to win the singles title at Wimbledon, which she did in 1931. She also won the women's single titles at the French Championships and German Championships in 1931. Aussem's coach and mixed doubles partner was Bill Tilden. They won the mixed doubles at the 1930 French Championships.

According to A. Wallis Myers of The Daily Telegraph and the Daily Mail, Aussem was ranked in the world top 10 in 1928, 1930, 1931, and 1934, reaching a career high of world no. 2 in these rankings in 1930 and 1931 behind Helen Wills Moody.

== Early years ==
Aussem was born in Cologne on 4 January 1909, the daughter of a wealthy salesman Johann Joseph 'Jean' Aussem and Ulrike Franziska 'Helen' Wisbaum. At the age of 14, she returned to Cologne after spending several years in Geneva getting a boarding school education. It was at this time that she started taking tennis lessons at the local club KTHC Stadion Rot-Weiss, driven by her mother, who was the first to notice her talent. She contacted Roman Najuch, the reigning world professional champion. Najuch referred Aussem to Willy Hanneman, a tennis coach from Cologne. Hannemann taught Aussem a sliced backhand, a precisely placed serve, and an effective drop shot. In 1925 she won the junior singles title at the German Championships in Erfurt and was ranked no. 6 nationally.

== Bill Tilden's advice ==
Aussem won the German Championships for the first time in 1927 when she was 18 years old. In Hamburg, she defeated reigning champion Ilse Friedleben in the final in straight sets. Aussem, who was described as a graceful, small, and psychologically sensitive girl, seemed incapable of withstanding the mental and physical pressures of competitive sports. Usually, the family traveled to exclusive places all over Europe. During the family's summer vacation at the French Riviera, Aussem's ambitious mother asked Bill Tilden, the world's best player, for advice. After having a look at small, shy Cilly, he replied: "My dear lady, Cilly will become a great champion if you take the next train back to Germany!"

Tilden became Aussem's coach and made her a world-class player. Aussem's trademark became her powerful, flat forehand. Newspapers wrote that Aussem had a great sliced backhand and effective drop shots. Her bst qualities were her precision, athletic conditioning, and fighting spirit.

== Breakthrough ==
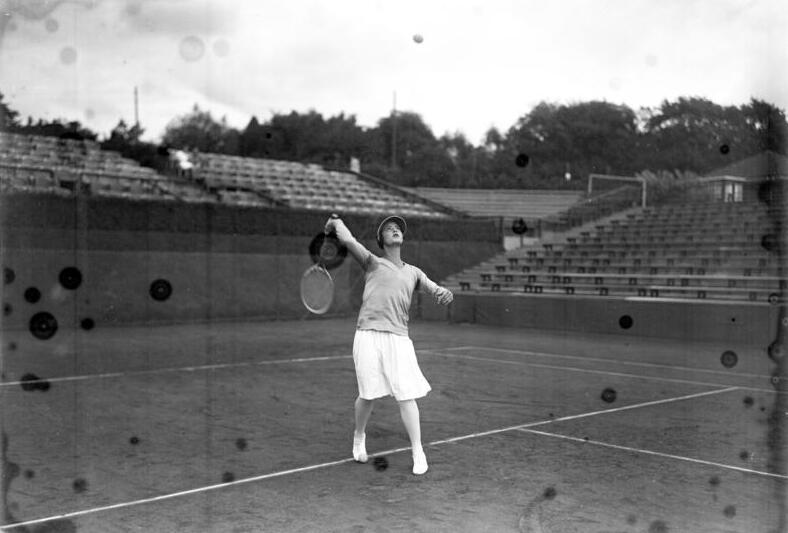
Cilly Aussem in 1930

In 1928, Aussem's mother claimed that Paula von Reznicek had twice beaten her daughter by using hypnotism, which led to a lawsuit in which Von Reznicek filed charges of defamation of character, and Aussem's mother charged her with "insulting assault". She lost her German Championships singles title in 1928 after a three-set defeat in the final to Daphne Akhurst.

Aussem suffered from eye inflammation throughout 1929, but in 1930, she had her breakthrough. With Tilden, she won all the titles for mixed doubles on the Riviera that season. At the French Championships, Aussem and Tilden defeated the world's top two mixed doubles teams, Elizabeth Ryan / Jean Borotra and Eileen Bennett Whittingstall / Henri Cochet, and took the French title. Aussem also reached a singles semifinal, losing to Helen Jacobs.

At Wimbledon, Aussem won against Jacobs in the quarterfinals and faced Ryan in the semifinals. The match ended unexpectedly. While running, Aussem tumbled, fell, twisted her ankle and lost consciousness. After that incident, health problems hampered the remainder of Aussem's tennis career. Her eyes became more sensitive, and she had to spend hours in a darkened room waiting for her matches to start.

In August 1930, she won her second German Championships singles title after a straight-sets victory in the final against compatriot Hilde Krahwinkel. At the end of 1930, three years after starting to play in international championships, she reached no. 2 in the world rankings.

== First German Wimbledon champion ==
1931 was Aussem's most successful year. She won the French Championships, defeating Betty Nuthall of the United Kingdom, and the German Championships after a win in the final against Irmgard Rost. Aussem also won the Wimbledon singles championship, defeating her compatriot Hilde Krahwinkel in the final in straight sets. She became the first German woman to do so. Aussem again was ranked world no. 2 behind Helen Wills Moody. An English newspaper described Aussem as follows: "There is a Paavo Nurmi of tennis from Germany, a beautiful young girl. Her quickness and her fighting spirit are singular!"

== Trip to South America, illness and Nazi party membership ==
All seemed to be prepared for a great international career when something happened that stopped Aussem's rapid rise. Celebrating the successful year of 1931, Aussem and her friend and teammate Irmgard Rost traveled to Argentina, Brazil and Chile. Aussem won some tournaments, but caught a serious liver inflammation. Back in Germany, she underwent surgery from which she recovered slowly.

She joined the Nazi Party on 1 May 1933 (membership number 3,526,491); her membership lapsed automatically when she moved to Italy three years later.

In 1933, Aussem returned to the courts, but was not able to regain her form. In 1934, she again reached ninth place in the world rankings, but started losing to players she always had beaten. She lost at Wimbledon to Helen Jacobs in the quarterfinals and quit the tour at age 25.

== Private life after tennis ==
During her winter holidays in Garmisch-Partenkirchen in 1935, Aussem met Italian Earl Fermo Murari dalla Corte Brà; they married in Munich on 11 March 1936, and the pair moved to Mombasa, Kenya. During her stay, she contracted malaria. Aussem spent the last two decades of her life mainly in her husband's castle in Portofino.

In 1963, she underwent another liver surgery, a late consequence of that trip to South America three decades before. Aussem did not recover. She died on 22 March 1963 at the age of 54.

German tennis player and writer Roderich Menzel wrote: "Everywhere where she swung her racket and warmed the spectators hearts with her magic smile, she unknowingly inspired young girls to play tennis the way she did. If we remember her today, we feel deep love in our hearts. And we confess proudly: She was our mistress of tennis."

Since 1965 the Junior Championships of the German Tennis Association are held under the name Grosse Cilly Aussem Spiele. However the proposal in 2018 to name a street after her in the city of her birth was rejected on the grounds of her Nazi Party membership.

== Grand Slam finals ==
=== Singles: 2 (2 titles) ===
| Result | Year | Championship | Surface | Opponent | Score |
|---|---|---|---|---|---|
| Win | 1931 | French Championships | Clay | (United Kingdom) Betty Nuthall | 8–6, 6–1 |
| Win | 1931 | Wimbledon | Grass | (Germany) Hilde Krahwinkel | 6–2, 7–5 |

=== Doubles: 1 (1 runner-up) ===
| Result | Year | Championship | Surface | Partner | Opponents | Score |
|---|---|---|---|---|---|---|
| Loss | 1931 | French Championships | Clay | (United States) Elizabeth Ryan | (United Kingdom) Eileen Bennett (United Kingdom) Betty Nuthall | 7–9, 2–6 |

=== Mixed doubles: 1 (1 title) ===
| Result | Year | Championship | Surface | Partner | Opponents | Score |
|---|---|---|---|---|---|---|
| Win | 1930 | French Championships | Clay | (United States) Bill Tilden | (United Kingdom) Eileen Bennett (France) Henri Cochet | 6–4, 6–4 |

== Grand Slam singles tournament timeline ==
Key
| W | F | SF | QF | #R | RR | Q# | DNQ | A | NH |

(W) winner; (F) finalist; (SF) semifinalist; (QF) quarterfinalist; (#R) rounds 4, 3, 2, 1; (RR) round-robin stage; (Q#) qualification round; (DNQ) did not qualify; (A) absent; (NH) not held; (SR) strike rate (events won / competed); (W–L) win–loss record.

| Tournament | 1927 | 1928 | 1929 | 1930 | 1931 | 1932 | 1933 | 1934 | Career SR |
|---|---|---|---|---|---|---|---|---|---|
| Australia | A | A | A | A | A | A | A | A | 0 / 0 |
| France | QF | 3R | SF | SF | W | QF | 2R | SF | 1 / 8 |
| Wimbledon | 2R | QF | 4R | SF | W | 1R^{1} | A | QF | 1 / 7 |
| United States | A | A | A | A | A | A | A | A | 0 / 0 |
| SR | 0 / 2 | 0 / 2 | 0 / 2 | 0 / 2 | 2 / 2 | 0 / 2 | 0 / 1 | 0 / 2 | 2 / 15 |

^{1} Aussem did not play. Her opponent got a walkover.

== See also ==
- Performance timelines for all female tennis players since 1978 who reached at least one Grand Slam final
