= George Lott =

American tennis player and coach (1906–1991)

- Full name: George Martin Lott
- Country (sports): United States
- Born: October 16, 1906 Springfield, Illinois, United States
- Died: December 3, 1991 (aged 85) Chicago, Illinois
- Turned pro: 1934 (amateur tour from 1924)
- Retired: 1946
- Plays: Right-handed (1-handed backhand)
- Int. Tennis HoF: 1964 (member page)

Singles
- Highest ranking: No. 4 (1931, Züricher Sport)

Grand Slam singles results
- French Open: QF (1931)
- Wimbledon: QF (1929, 1930, 1934)
- US Open: F (1931)

Other tournaments
- Professional majors
- US Pro: QF (1938)
- Wembley Pro: QF (1935)

Grand Slam doubles results
- French Open: W (1931)
- Wimbledon: W (1931, 1934)
- US Open: W (1928, 1929, 1930, 1933, 1934)

Grand Slam mixed doubles results
- Wimbledon: W (1931)
- US Open: W (1929, 1931, 1934)

Team competitions
- Davis Cup: F (1929, 1930, 1934)

George Martin Lott (October 16, 1906 – December 3, 1991) was an American tennis player and tennis coach who was born in Springfield, Illinois. Lott is mostly remembered as being one of the great doubles players of all time. He won the U.S. title five times with three different partners: John Hennessey in 1928; John Doeg in 1929 and 1930; and Les Stoefen in 1933 and 1934.

== Career ==
At the U.S. championships singles in 1928, Lott beat Christian Boussus and John Doeg then lost to Frank Hunter in the semifinals. In 1931, Lott beat defending champion Doeg in the semifinals, then lost to Ellsworth Vines in the final.

In five appearances at the Cincinnati Open, Lott amassed a 30-1 singles record and won four singles titles (1924, 1925, 1927 & 1932). His only loss came in the 1926 singles final where he fell to Bill Tilden, 4-6, 6-3, 7-9, 6-4, 6-3.

Lott won the Canadian Covered Court Championships four times. In 1927, he defeated Canadian Willard Crocker in a five-set final; in 1928, he defeated Frank Shields in straight sets in the final; in 1930, he defeated Frederic Mercur in a five-set final; and in 1931, he defeated Berkeley Bell in straight sets in the semifinals and John Van Ryn in a five-set final.

In 1928, he won the Pinehurst Resort title on clay, defeating Shields in the final in a five-set match.

In 1929 and 1930, he was ranked World No. 6 and No. 7 by A Wallis Myers; No. 6 by Pierre Gillon in 1930; and in 1931 was ranked No. 4 by Züricher Sport.

In 1934, Lott became a touring professional, giving up his amateur status and the ability to play in Grand Slam tournaments. He signed a professional contract in November 1934 with promoter Bill O'Brien and in January 1935 and started a series of head-to-head matches against Bill Tilden; by March, he trailed Tilden 5–26.

Lott was the men's tennis coach at [DePaul University from 1969 until his death in Chicago on December 3, 1991. He had been inducted into the school's Athletics Hall of Fame in 1984.

Lott was inducted into the International Tennis Hall of Fame in 1964.

== Grand Slam finals ==
=== Singles (1 runner-up) ===
| Result | Year | Championship | Surface | Opponent | Score |
|---|---|---|---|---|---|
| Loss | 1931 | U.S. National Championships | Grass | (United States) Ellsworth Vines | 9–7, 3–6, 7–9, 5–7 |

=== Doubles (8 titles, 1 runner-up) ===
| Result | Year | Championship | Surface | Partner | Opponents | Score |
|---|---|---|---|---|---|---|
| Win | 1928 | U.S. National Championships | Grass | (United States) John Hennessey | (Australia) Gerald Patterson (Australia) Jack Hawkes | 6–2, 6–1, 6–2 |
| Win | 1929 | U.S. National Championships | Grass | (United States) John Doeg | (United States) Berkeley Bell (United States) Lewis White | 10–8, 16–14, 6–1 |
| Loss | 1930 | Wimbledon | Grass | (United States) John Doeg | (United States) John Van Ryn (United States) Wilmer Allison | 3–6, 3–6, 2–6 |
| Win | 1930 | U.S. National Championships | Grass | (United States) John Doeg | (United States) John Van Ryn (United States) Wilmer Allison | 8–6, 6–3, 4–6, 13–15, 6–4 |
| Win | 1931 | French Championships | Clay | (United States) John Van Ryn | (South Africa) Vernon Kirby (South Africa) Norman Farquharson | 6–4, 6–3, 6–4 |
| Win | 1931 | Wimbledon | Grass | (United States) John Van Ryn | (France) Jacques Brugnon (France) Henri Cochet | 6–2, 10–8, 9–11, 3–6, 6–3 |
| Win | 1933 | U.S. National Championships | Grass | (United States) Lester Stoefen | (United States) Frank Shields (United States) Frank Parker | 11–13, 9–7, 9–7, 6–3 |
| Win | 1934 | Wimbledon | Grass | (United States) Lester Stoefen | (France) Jean Borotra (France) Jacques Brugnon | 6–2, 6–3, 6–4 |
| Win | 1934 | U.S. National Championships | Grass | (United States) Lester Stoefen | (United States) Wilmer Allison (United States) John Van Ryn | 6–4, 9–7, 3–6, 6–4 |

=== Mixed doubles (4 titles, 1 runner-up) ===
| Result | Year | Championship | Surface | Partner | Opponents | Score |
|---|---|---|---|---|---|---|
| Win | 1929 | U.S. National Championships | Grass | (United Kingdom) Betty Nuthall | (United Kingdom) Phyllis Covell (United Kingdom) Bunny Austin | 6–3, 6–3 |
| Win | 1931 | Wimbledon | Grass | (United States) Anna McCune Harper | (United Kingdom) Joan Ridley (United Kingdom) Ian Collins | 6–3, 1–6, 6–1 |
| Win | 1931 | U.S. National Championships | Grass | (United Kingdom) Betty Nuthall | (United States) Anna McCune Harper (United States) Wilmer Allison | 6–3, 6–3 |
| Loss | 1933 | U.S. National Championships | Grass | (United States) Sarah Palfrey | (United States) Elizabeth Ryan (United States) Ellsworth Vines | 9–11, 1–6 |
| Win | 1934 | U.S. National Championships | Grass | (United States) Helen Jacobs | (United States) Elizabeth Ryan (United States) Lester Stoefen | 4–6, 13–11, 6–2 |

== Other tennis achievements ==
- Davis Cup team member – 1928–31, 1933–34
- The first player, and one of only four (Bobby Riggs, Mats Wilander and Roger Federer being the other three), to win the Cincinnati Open four times: 1924, 1925, 1927 and 1932. Also won the doubles title in 1924 (with Jack Harris) and 1925 (with Thomas McGlinn) and was a singles finalist in 1926 and a doubles finalist (with Thomas Johnson) in 1927.
