= Pat Spence =

South African tennis player (1898–1983)

Patrick Spence
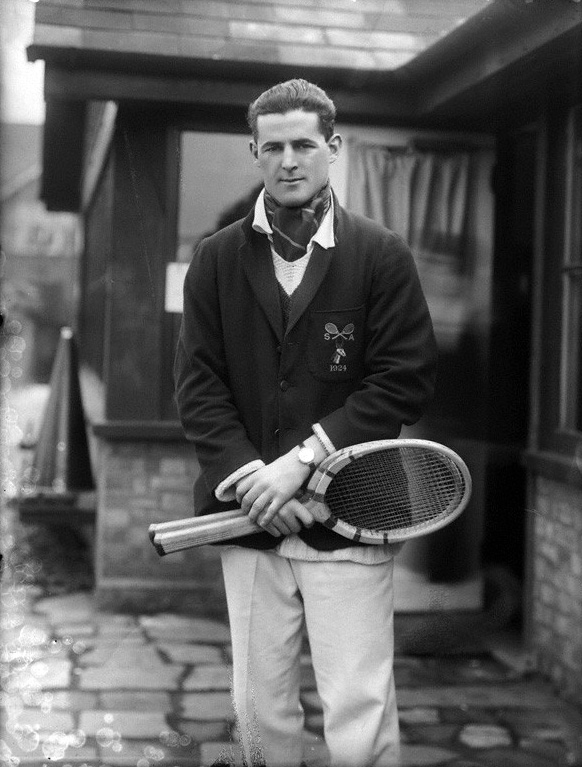
- Full name: Patrick Dennis Benham Spence
- Country (sports): South Africa
- Born: 11 February 1898 Queenstown, Cape Colony
- Died: 22 November 1983 (aged 85)
- Turned pro: 1922 (amateur tour)
- Retired: 1936
- Plays: Right-handed (one-handed backhand)

Singles
- Career titles: 14

Grand Slam singles results
- French Open: SF (1927)
- Wimbledon: QF (1926)

Other tournaments
- Olympic Games: 4R (1924)

Doubles

Grand Slam doubles results
- Wimbledon: SF (1924)

Mixed doubles

Grand Slam mixed doubles results
- French Open: W (1931)
- Wimbledon: W (1928)

Patrick Spence (11 February 1898 – 22 November 1983) was a South African tennis player. He was born in Queenstown, South Africa. He competed mainly in Great Britain and found his form in hard court tournaments. He notably won the mixed doubles championships at Wimbledon in 1928 with Elizabeth Ryan and at the French Open in 1931 with Betty Nuthall. He also competed at the 1924 Summer Olympics. He was active from 1922 to 1936 and won 14 career singles titles on grass and clay courts outdoors, as well as indoor wood courts.

== Tennis career ==
Patrick Spence began his tennis prominence in Great Britain in 1922 when he became Scottish champion after winning the local tournament. The next year he defended his title.

In 1924 he took the Middlesex Championships against compatriot Louis Raymond, with whom he also won the doubles title, but lost the mixed doubles title against him. He first became the covered courts champion at the Queen's Club the same year by beating reigning champion Patrick Wheatley in three sets.

In April 1925 he won the British Hard Court Championships over Charles Kingsley. He also won the mixed doubles with Evelyn Colyer. A week later, at the Surrey Hard Court Championships, he defeated Randolph Lycett of Australia in straight sets. At another hard court tournament in London he was defeated by Indian Sydney M. Jacob in five sets. He shared the doubles victory with Raymond and the mixed doubles with Colyer. In September he won the North London Hard Courts Championships on clay at the Gipsy Lawn Tennis Club, Stamford Hill against Harry Lewis-Barclay. In October he successfully defended his covered courts title against Edward Higgs. That month he failed to capture the Drive Club Open Tournament title.

In 1926 he was a finalist for the Kent Championships.

In 1927 Spence reached the semi-finals of the French championships, beating Frank Hunter before losing to René Lacoste. He met Lacoste for his second British Hard Court Championships trophy but was subdued in straight sets. He also lost the doubles against the French team of Lacoste and Brugnon. The next year they had their rematch also in the final and Lacoste overcame Spence for the second time.

In 1928, he was upset in the final of the Kent Championships for the second time. He also lost the Middlesex Championships to Randolph Lycett. However, he was more successful in his mixed doubles matches, including the final of the Nottingham Championships, which he won with Betty Nuthall. One of his bigger accomplishments came when he took the 1928 Wimbledon Championships mixed doubles contest with Elizabeth Ryan.

In 1930, as a member of the International Tennis Club of Great Britain, he participated in the team challenge against Rot-Weiss Club of Berlin, winning all of his four matches (two singles and two doubles) and defeating high-profile players such as Daniel Prenn and Heinrich Kleinschroth. Also in 1930 he lost the London Covered Courts Championships to Yoshiro Ohta, but as many times before he was triumphant in the mixed contest with his recurring partner Nuthall.

In 1931, he was a runner-up for the doubles tournament of the West-England Championships with Edward Avory, losing to the Japanese pair of Jiro Satoh and Ryuki Miki. He was also runner up in the Championship of London in doubles. As in his previous years his breakthrough came in the mixed doubles competitions; first he and Betty Nuthall went for the British Hard Court Championships in April and were only eliminated in the final, while in May they won the mixed title at the French Championships (now the French Open).

A couple of years later, in 1935, he reached the final of the Surrey Grass Court Championships, where he was stopped by New Zealand's Eskell D. Andrews. The importance of that particular match was the test of a new service rule implemented for the first time there, which allowed the server to swing his leg over the baseline on serve but introduced the service box. In 1936 he won the Queen's Club hard court doubles with John Olliff.

In the Davis Cup, he set a 14–7 match record (66% winning ratio) and represented South Africa from 1924 to 1931.

== Personal life ==
Patrick Spence was born 11 February 1898 in Queenstown, Cape Colony. He moved to Edinburgh after the First World War. He graduated from Edinburgh University with a doctorate in medicine. Apart from playing tennis, he was an amateur rugby player. He worked at Guy's Hospital in London and then in Richmond, London in 1930. Later with several colleagues, he was in private practice in Kingston-on-Thames as Howlett, Kemp, Carson and Spence, from which he retired in 1934. He formed a real-life couple with his 18-year-old doubles partner Betty Nuthall, with whom he won the French Open mixed doubles tournament in 1931. He married Joy Robson, a ballerina with Sadler Wells Ballet, and had four children: Mikael, Stephen, Mandy and Charles

== Playing style ==
British Davis Cup team member Nigel Sharpe described him as an attacking type of player. He preferred to pace the ball rather than give it a spin. He tended to go to the net, but his volley showed indecisiveness. He possessed a severe overhead shot. He had a long-swinged forehand, on which he applied a moderate topspin. His backhand was weak, and he always placed himself to receive the ball to his forehand side.

== Grand Slam finals ==
=== Mixed doubles (2 titles) ===
Result	Year	Championship	Surface	Partner	Opponents	Score
Win	1928	Wimbledon	Grass	(United States) Elizabeth Ryan	(Australia) Daphne Akhurst (Australia) Jack Crawford	7–5, 6–4
Win	1931	French Championships	Clay	(United Kingdom) Betty Nuthall	(United Kingdom) Dorothy Shepherd Barron (United Kingdom) Bunny Austin	6–3, 5–7, 6–3
