= 1930 U.S. National Championships – Men's singles =

Men's singles
- 1930 U.S. National Championships

Final
- Champion: (United States) John Doeg
- Runner-up: (United States) Frank Shields
- Score: 10–8, 1–6, 6–4, 16–14

Details
- Draw: 95
- Seeds: 16

Events
Singles	men	women		boys	girls
Doubles	men	women	mixed	boys	girls
← 1929 ·	U.S. National Championships	· 1931 →

John Doeg defeated Frank Shields 10–8, 1–6, 6–4, 16–14 in the final to win the men's singles tennis title at the 1930 U.S. National Championships. Reigning champion Bill Tilden lost to Doeg in the semifinals.

== Seeds ==
The tournament used two lists of eight players for seeding the men's singles event; one for U.S. players and one for foreign players. John Doeg is the champion; others show the round in which they were eliminated.

1. (United States) Bill Tilden (semifinals)
2. (United States) Wilmer Allison (fourth round)
3. (United States) George Lott (quarterfinals)
4. (United States) Sidney Wood (semifinals)
5. (United States) Clifford Sutter (quarterfinals)
6. (United States) John Doeg (champion)
7. (United States) Gregory Mangin (quarterfinals)
8. (United States) John Van Ryn (quarterfinals)
1. (France) Jean Borotra (first round)
2. (United Kingdom) Harry Lee (fourth round)
3. (United Kingdom) John Olliff (fourth round)
4. (United Kingdom) Fred Perry (fourth round)
5. (Republic of Ireland) George Lyttleton-Rogers (fourth round)
6. (Canada) Marcel Rainville (second round)
7. (United Kingdom) Ted Avory (third round)
8. (United Kingdom) Leslie Godfree (fourth round)

== Draw ==
=== Key ===
- Q = Qualifier
- WC = Wild card
- LL = Lucky loser
- Alt = Alternate
- ITF = ITF entry
- PR = Protected ranking
- SR = Special ranking
- SE = Special exempt
- JE = Junior exempt
- JR = Junior Accelerator Programme entrant
- CO = College Accelerator Programme entrant
- NG = Next Gen Accelerator Program entrant
- w/o = Walkover
- r = Retired
- d = Defaulted

=== Final eight ===
Quarterfinals
(United States) Frank Shields	3	6	6	6	6
(United States) Gregory Mangin	6	8	2	1	1
(United States) Sidney Wood	6	6	2	7
(United States) Clifford Sutter	4	3	6	5
(United States) Bill Tilden	4	6	6	6
(United States) John Van Ryn	6	2	4	4
(United States) Frank Hunter	13	4	6	2	4
(United States) John Doeg	11	6	3	6	6'

Semifinals
(United States) Frank Shields	6	6	4	6
(United States) Sidney Wood	2	3	6	3
(United States) Bill Tilden	8	3	6	10
(United States) John Doeg	10	6	3	12

Finals
(United States) Frank Shields	8	6	4	14
(United States) John Doeg	10	1	6	16

=== Earlier rounds ===
==== Section 1 ====
First round

Second round
2	(United States) Allison	6	6	6
(United States) Bryan	3	3	3
(United States) Murphy	8	6	6
(United States) Culley	6	1	3
(United States) Shields	6	6	6
(United States) Tarangioli	1	0	3
(United States) Griffin	6	0	2	6	6
(6)	(Canada) Rainville	4	6	6	2	4

Third round
2	(United States) Allison	4	6	6	6
(United States) Murphy	6	1	3	3
(United States) Shields	6	6	7
(United States) Griffin	4	4	5

Fourth round
2	(United States) Allison	4	6	2	6	3
(United States) Shields	6	4	6	1	6

==== Section 2 ====
First round

Second round
7	(United States) Mangin	6	6	6
(United States) Hammell	1	3	2
(United States) Neer	2	3	5
(United States) Hennessey	6	6	7
(United States) Werner	9	9	6
(United States) Washburn	7	7	3
(United States) Langlie
(3)	(United Kingdom) Olliff	w	o

Third round
7	(United States) Mangin	6	6	6
(United States) Hennessey	2	0	1
(United States) Werner	4	2	0
(3)	(United Kingdom) Olliff	6	6	6

Fourth round
7	(United States) Mangin	6	6	10
(3)	(United Kingdom) Olliff	2	3	8

==== Section 3 ====
First round
4	(United States) Wood	6	6	6
(United Kingdom) Evans	1	2	0
(United States) Seligson
(United States) Tidball	w/	o
(United States) Jennings	2	3	4
(United States) Coen	6	6	6
(United States) Hall	6	6	6
(United States) Bruneau	0	1	2
(United States) Grant	6	7	10
(United States) Major	1	5	8
(United States) Roll	3	6	6	1
(United States) Jones	6	3	8	6
(Canada) Morrice	1	2	2
(United States) Gilpin	6	6	6
(United States) Fowler	6	6	6
(8)	(United Kingdom) Godfree	1	3	2

Second round
4	(United States) Wood	4	2	6	6	6
(United States) Seligson	6	6	0	1	4
(United States) Coen	6	6	6	6
(United States) Hall	2	4	8	1
(United States) Grant	8	6	4	6
(United States) Jones	6	4	6	2
(United States) Gilpin	6	6	7
(United States) Fowler	3	1	5

Third round
4	(United States) Wood	6	1	6	6
(United States) Coen	2	6	1	1
(United States) Grant	2	6	9	6	4
(United States) Gilpin	6	4	11	3	6

Fourth round
4	(United States) Wood	6	6	6
(United States) Gilpin	3	2	3

==== Section 4 ====
First round
5	(United States) Sutter	5	6	6	2	6
(United States) MacPherson	7	4	2	6	1
(United States) Paré	6	6	6
(United States) Frame	1	1	3
(United States) Bowman	6	6	6
(United States) Fischer	0	0	1
(United States) Appel	1	6	3	3
(Canada) Leslie	6	3	6	6
(United States) Strachan	8	4	0	1
(United States) Lewis	6	6	6	6
(United States) MacGuffin	6	6	7
(United States) Dailey	3	2	5
(United States) Nordstrom	w/	o
(United States) Mercur
(United States) Bell	3	6	12	7
(1)	(France) Borotra	6	2	10	5

Second round
5	(United States) Sutter	6	6	8
(United States) Paré	2	0	6
(United States) Bowman	7	7	6	6
(Canada) Leslie	9	5	4	3
(United States) Lewis	6	6	6
(United States) MacGuffin	3	4	4
(United States) Mercur	1	2	6	4
(United States) Bell	6	6	1	6

Third round
5	(United States) Sutter	6	2	4	6	6
(United States) Bowman	1	6	6	3	3
(United States) Lewis	3	4	11
(United States) Bell	6	6	13

Fourth round
5	(United States) Sutter	7	6	6	2	8
(United States) Bell	9	4	1	6	6

==== Section 5 ====
First round
1	(United States) Tilden	6	6	6
(United States) Halberstadt	1	0	4
(United States) Armstrong
(United States) Harte	w/	o
(United States) DeLara	6	6	6
(United States) Fischer	3	2	4
(United States) Feibleman	6	6	8
(United States) Considine	4	2	6
(United States) Vines	6	7	6
(United States) DeMott	3	5	3
(United States) Barnes	6	6	3	10
(United States) Millen	3	3	6	8
(United States) Sheridan	6	1	1	1
(United States) Burns	2	6	6	6
(United States) Jenkins	1	6	3
(5)	(Republic of Ireland) Rogers	6	8	6

Second round
1	(United States) Tilden	6	6	6
(United States) Armstrong	1	1	0
(United States) DeLara	3	7	2
(United States) Feibleman	6	9	6
(United States) Vines	12	7	7
(United States) Barnes	10	5	5
(United States) Burns	9	6	5	9	2
(5)	(Republic of Ireland) Rogers	7	2	7	11	6

Third round
1	(United States) Tilden	6	6	6
(United States) Feibleman	1	1	0
(United States) Vines	6	6	4	1	4
(5)	(Republic of Ireland) Rogers	4	4	6	6	6

Fourth round
1	(United States) Tilden	6	6	6
(5)	(Republic of Ireland) Rogers	4	1	2

==== Section 6 ====
First round
8	(United States) Van Ryn	6	6	6
(United States) Jones	0	2	2
(United States) Clines	3	1	1
(United States) Reid	6	6	6
(United States) Bartosch	w/	o
(United States) Kynaston
(France) Gerbault	4	1	0
(United States) Gledhill	6	6	6
(United States) Jacobs	1	6	6	6
(United States) Boehmer	6	3	4	2
(United States) von Bernuth	4	6	4	2
(United States) Bowden	6	4	6	6
(United States) Bonneau	1	4	2
(Japan) Onda	6	6	6

Second round
8	(United States) Van Ryn	6	6	6
(United States) Reid	1	1	2
(United States) Kynaston	1	4	10	3
(United States) Gledhill	6	6	8	6
(United States) Jacobs	6	6	6
(United States) Bowden	1	4	1
(Japan) Onda	4	6	2	6	4
(4)	(United Kingdom) Perry	6	2	6	4	6

Third round
8	(United States) Van Ryn	6	6	6
(United States) Gledhill	2	4	1
(United States) Jacobs	2	3	3
(4)	(United Kingdom) Perry	6	6	6

Fourth round
8	(United States) Van Ryn	4	6	6	6
(4)	(United Kingdom) Perry	6	3	4	1

==== Section 7 ====
First round

Second round
3	(United States) Lott	9	5	5	1
(United States) Williams	7	7	7	6
(United States) Blauer	6	7	3	6
(Cuba) Upmann	0	5	6	2
(United States) Hunter	6	6	6
(United States) Phillips	2	0	2
(United States) McCauliff	1	1	1
(7)	(United Kingdom) Avory	6	6	6

Third round
(United States) Williams	6	6	6
(United States) Blauer	4	3	3
(United States) Hunter	4	8	6	6
(7)	(United Kingdom) Avory	6	6	2	2

Fourth round
(United States) Williams	5	2	4
(United States) Hunter	7	6	6

==== Section 8 ====
First round

Second round
6	(United States) Doeg	6	6	5	4	6
(United States) Wood	2	2	7	6	2
(United States) Watt	13	4	6	6
(United Kingdom) Nuttall	11	6	3	4
(United States) Lang	5	6	6	6
(United States) Martin	7	3	3	3
(United States) Smith	0	7	2	2
(2)	(United Kingdom) Lee	6	5	6	6

Third round
6	(United States) Doeg	6	4	6	6
(United States) Watt	4	6	2	4
(United States) Lang	3	4	2
(2)	(United Kingdom) Lee	6	6	6

Fourth round
6	(United States) Doeg	8	6	6
(2)	(United Kingdom) Lee	6	1	4

Preceded by 1930 Wimbledon Championships	Grand Slams; Men's Singles	Succeeded by 1931 Australian Championships
