= Fred Perry Grand Slam record =

This is British tennis player Fred Perry's record in the Grand Slams.

== Australian Championships ==
Year	Round	Opponent	Score
1934	Round 1	Bye	
1934	Round 2	(Australia) Les Poidevin	6–3, 6–2, 2–6, 6–2
1934	Round 3	(Australia) J. Rodgers	6–0, 8–6, 6–3
1934	Quarter-Final	(Australia) Harry Hopman	6–3, 6–4, 6–3
1934	Semi-Final	(Australia) Vivian McGrath	2–6, 5–7, 6–4, 6–4, 6–1
1934	Final	(Australia) Jack Crawford	6–3, 7–5, 6–1
1935	Round 1	Bye	
1935	Round 2	(Australia) E. Mahony	6–3, 6–4, 6–2
1935	Round 3	(South Africa) Roy Malcolm	6–2, 6–3, 6–0
1935	Quarter-Final	(Italy) Giorgio de Stefani	6–0, 6–0, 6–0
1935	Semi-Final	(Australia) Vivian McGrath	6–2, 6–3, 6–1
1935	Final	(Australia) Jack Crawford	6–2, 4–6, 4–6, 4–6

== French Championships ==
year	Round	Opponent	Score
1931	Round 1	(France) Louis Geraud	w/o
1931	Round 2	(France) Pierre Goldschmidt	6–0, 6–3, 6–3
1931	Round 3	(France) Marcel Bernard	6–4, 6–1, 6–4
1931	Round 4	(Italy) Giorgio de Stefani	3–6, 4–6, 7–5, 5–7
1932	Round 1	Bye	
1932	Round 2	(France) Andrú Contanson	6–2, 6–3, 6–3
1932	Round 3	(France) Antoine Gentien	14–12, 4–6, 6–2, 6–2
1932	Round 4	(Austria) Franz Matejka	6–4, 6–2, 6–2
1932	Quarter-Final	(Weimar Republic) Roderich Menzel	6–2, 1–6, 6–1, 3–6, 5–7
1933	Round 1	Bye	
1933	Round 2	(France) Robert Billaudot	6–1, 6–1, 6–2
1933	Round 3	(France) Jean Rimet	6–3, 6–3, 6–3
1933	Round 4	(Czechoslovakia) Josef Malacek	6–0, 4–6, 7–5, 6–3
1933	Quarter-Final	(Empire of Japan) Jiro Sato	6–1, 5–7, 4–6, 6–2, 2–6
1934	Round 1	Bye	
1934	Round 2	(France) Jean Augustin	6–4, 6–1, 6–1
1934	Round 3	(France) Franþois Merlin	6–2, 6–3, 6–4
1934	Round 4	(Australia) Harry Hopman	6–2, 6–3, 6–3
1934	Quarter-Final	(Italy) Giorgio de Stefani	2–6, 6–1, 7–9, 2–6
1935	Round 1	Bye	
1935	Round 2	(Monaco) Vladimir Landau	3–6, 6–4, 6–3, 6–2
1935	Round 3	(Spain) Enrique Maier	6–2, 6–4, 6–2
1935	Round 4	(Australia) Don Turnbull	6–3, 6–3, 6–3
1935	Quarter-Final	(France) Christian Boussus	6–1, 6–0, 6–4
1935	Semi-Final	(Australia) Jack Crawford	6–3, 8–6, 6–3
1935	Final	(Nazi Germany) Gottfried von Cramm	6–3, 3–6, 6–1, 6–3
1936	Round 1	Bye	
1936	Round 2	(France) Roger George	7–5, 8–6, 9–7
1936	Round 3	(France) Franþois Terrier	6–0, 6–4, 6–4
1936	Round 4	(France) Andrú Martin-Legeay	6–2, 6–3, 0–6, 6–3
1936	Quarter-Final	(Switzerland) Boris Maneff	9–7, 6–3, 4–6, 6–3
1936	Semi-Final	(France) Christian Boussus	6–4, 7–5, 5–7, 6–2
1936	Final	(Nazi Germany) Gottfried von Cramm	0–6, 6–2, 2–6, 6–2, 0–6

== Wimbledon Championships ==
Year	Round	Opponent	Score
1929	Round 1	(Italy) Roberto Bocciardo	7–5, 2–6, 6–4, 3–6, 9–7
1929	Round 2	(United Kingdom) Norman Dicks	3–6, 6–2, 6–2, 6–4
1929	Round 3	(United Kingdom) Martin Buxby	4–6, 2–6, 6–2, 3–6
1930	Round 1	(United Kingdom) Brame Hillyard	6–3, 6–4, 6–2
1930	Round 2	(United Kingdom) Orson Wright	6–1, 6–2, 6–3
1930	Round 3	(Italy) Umberto De Morpurgo	10–8, 4–6, 6–1, 6–2
1930	Round 4	(United Kingdom) Colin Gregory	6–3, 7–9, 1–6, 6–3, 1–6
1931	Round 1	(United Kingdom) James Cummins	6–1, 6–3, 6–3
1931	Round 2	(Empire of Japan) Iwao Aoki	7–5, 6–2, 6–3
1931	Round 3	(France) Coco Gentien	6–2, 6–3, 8–6
1931	Round 4	(Weimar Republic) Gottfried von Cramm	7–5, 6–2, 6–4
1931	Quarter-Final	(United States) John Van Ryn	6–4, 8–6, 7–5
1931	Semi-Final	(United States) Sidney Wood	6–4, 2–6, 4–6, 2–6
1932	Round 1	(United Kingdom) Guy Jameson	6–3, 6–2, 6–4
1932	Round 2	(United Kingdom) Herman David	6–4, 6–3, 5–7, 6–1
1932	Round 3	(United States) John Van Ryn	6–3, 6–4, 6–0
1932	Round 4	(United States) Wilmer Allison	6–4, 6–1, 4–6, 6–2
1932	Quarter-Final	(Australia) Jack Crawford	5–7, 6–8, 6–2, 6–8
1933	Round 1	(Belgium) André Lacroix	6–3, 6–3, 6–2
1933	Round 2	(South Africa) Norman Farquharson	5–7, 1–6, 6–3, 6–4, 4–6
1934	Round 1	(United Kingdom) Raymond Tuckey	6–2, 6–2, 5–7, 6–0
1934	Round 2	(United States) R. Norris Williams	6–2, 6–2, 6–0
1934	Round 3	(Czechoslovakia) Roderich Menzel	0–6, 6–3, 5–7, 6–4, 6–2
1934	Round 4	(Australia) Adrian Quist	6–2, 6–3, 6–4
1934	Quarter-Final	(United States) George Lott	6–4, 2–6, 7–5, 10–8
1934	Semi-Final	(United States) Sidney Wood	6–3, 3–6, 7–5, 5–7, 6–3
1934	Final	(Australia) Jack Crawford	6–3, 6–0, 7–5
1935	Round 1	(Canada) Marcel Rainville	6–1, 6–1, 6–3
1935	Round 2	(United States) Wilmer Hines	6–1, 7–5, 6–3
1935	Round 3	(United States) John Van Ryn	4–6, 6–1, 6–3, 10–8
1935	Round 4	(Kingdom of Yugoslavia) Josip Palada	6–2, 6–2, 0–6, 6–2
1935	Quarter-Final	(Czechoslovakia) Roderich Menzel	9–7, 6–1, 6–1
1935	Semi-Final	(Australia) Jack Crawford	6–2, 3–6, 6–4, 6–4
1935	Final	(Nazi Germany) Gottfried von Cramm	6–2, 6–4, 6–4
1936	Round 1	(United States) Gerald Stratford	6–4, 6–3, 6–1
1936	Round 2	(Thailand) Kasom Chartikavanij	6–3, 6–2, 6–2
1936	Round 3	(United States) John Van Ryn	6–3, 6–2, 6–0
1936	Round 4	(New Zealand) Cam Malfroy	6–2, 6–2, 6–4
1936	Quarter-Final	(United States) Bryan Grant	6–4, 6–3, 6–1
1936	Semi-Final	(United States) Don Budge	5–7, 6–3, 6–4, 6–3
1936	Final	(Nazi Germany) Gottfried von Cramm	6–1, 6–1, 6–0

== U.S. Championships] ==
Year	Round	Opponent	Score
1930	Round 1	Bye	
1930	Round 2	(Japan) Sadakazu Onda	6–4, 2–6, 6–2, 4–6, 6–4
1930	Round 3	E. Jacobs	6–2, 6–3, 6–3
1930	Round 4	(United States) John Van Ryn	6–4, 3–6, 4–6, 1–6
1931	Round 1	J. Seligson	6–4, 7–5, 4–6, 6–0
1931	Round 2	E. Tarangioli	6–3, 6–2, 10–8
1931	Round 3	H. Bowman	6–3, 7–5, 6–2
1931	Round 4	(United States) Clifford Sutter	4–6, 6–4, 6–3, 6–3
1931	Quarter-Final	(United States) Frank Bowden	6–2, 6–3, 6–4
1931	Semi-Final	(United States) Ellsworth Vines	6–4, 6–3, 4–6, 4–6, 3–6
1933	Round 1	(United States) Edward Burns	6–1, 6–3, 6–2
1933	Round 2	(United States) Robert Bryan	3–6, 6–3, 6–0, 6–3
1933	Round 3	(United States) Marco Hecht	6–1, 6–4, 6–4
1933	Round 4	(United States) Keith Gledhill	6–2, 4–6, 1–6, 6–3, 6–3
1933	Quarter-Final	(Australia) Adrian Quist	6–4, 6–4, 6–0
1933	Semi-Final	(United States) Lester Stoefen	6–3, 6–2, 6–2
1933	Final	(Australia) Jack Crawford	6–3, 11–13, 4–6, 6–0, 6–1
1934	Round 1	(United States) Carl Schweikhardt	6–0, 6–1, 6–3
1934	Round 2	(United States) Martin Buxby	6–3, 6–1, 6–4
1934	Round 3	(United States) Jack Talbot	6–3, 6–1, 6–4
1934	Round 4	(United States) William Fiebleman	6–2, 6–1, 6–2
1934	Quarter-Final	(United States) Clifford Sutter	6–3, 6–0, 6–2
1934	Semi-Final	(South Africa) Vernon Kirby	6–2, 2–6, 6–4, 6–2
1934	Final	(United States) Wilmer Allison	6–4, 6–3, 3–6, 1–6, 8–6
1935	Round 1	Bye	
1935	Round 2	(United States) Arthur Fowler	6–3, 6–2, 6–1
1935	Round 3	(United States) Leonard Hartman	6–4, 6–3, 7–5
1935	Round 4	(United States) Frank Parker	6–4, 6–2, 6–0
1935	Quarter-Final	(United States) Frank Shields	6–4, 4–6, 8–6, 6–0
1935	Semi-Final	(United States) Wilmer Allison	5–7, 3–6, 3–6
1936	Round 1	(United States) Alfred Jarvis	6–0, 6–0, 6–2
1936	Round 2	(United States) Ernest Sutter	8–6, 6–2, 6–1
1936	Round 3	(United States) David Jones	6–3, 6–1, 4–6, 6–0
1936	Round 4	(United States) Gene Mako	6–0, 6–3, 6–2
1936	Quarter-Final	(United States) Henry Culley	6–3, 6–2, 6–1
1936	Semi-Final	(United States) Bryan Grant	6–4, 3–6, 7–5, 6–2
1936	Final	(United States) Don Budge	2–6, 6–2, 8–6, 1–6, 10–8
