= 1932 U.S. National Championships – Men's singles =

Men's singles
- 1932 U.S. National Championships

Final
- Champion: (United States) Ellsworth Vines
- Runner-up: (France) Henri Cochet
- Score: 6–4, 6–4, 6–4

Events
Singles	men	women
Doubles	men	women
← 1931 ·	U.S. National Championships	· 1933 →

First-seeded Ellsworth Vines defeated first foreign seeded Henri Cochet 6–4, 6–4, 6–4 in the final to win the men's singles tennis title at the 1932 U.S. National Championships.

== Seeds ==
The tournament used two lists of eight players for seeding the men's singles event; one for U.S. players and one for foreign players. Ellsworth Vines is the champion; others show the round in which they were eliminated.

1. (United States) Ellsworth Vines (champion)
2. (United States) Wilmer Allison (semifinals)
3. (United States) Frank Shields (quarterfinals)
4. (United States) George Lott (quarterfinals)
5. (United States) Sidney Wood (quarterfinals)
6. (United States) Clifford Sutter (semifinals)
7. (United States) John Van Ryn (fourth round)
8. (United States) Gregory Mangin (fourth round)
1. (France) Henri Cochet (finalist)
2. (United Kingdom) Bunny Austin (fourth round)
3. (United Kingdom) Fred Perry (fourth round)
4. (Japan) Jiro Satoh (second round)
5. (Japan) Takeo Kuwabara (fourth round)
6. (France) Marcel Bernard (third round)
7. (United Kingdom) John Olliff (fourth round)
8. (United Kingdom) Edward Avory (fourth round)

== Draw ==
=== Finals ===
Quarterfinals
1	(United States) Ellsworth Vines	6	7	6
(United States) Lester Stoefen	3	5	4
4	(United States) George Lott	8	0	0
6	(United States) Clifford Sutter	10	6	6
2	(United States) Wilmer Allison	5	6	6	6
5	(United States) Sidney Wood	7	3	2	4
3	(United States) Frank Shields	6	3	4	0
(1)	(France) Henri Cochet	4	6	6	6

Semifinals
1	(United States) Ellsworth Vines	4	8	12	10	6
6	(United States) Clifford Sutter	6	10	10	8	1
2	(United States) Wilmer Allison	1	12	6	3	5
(1)	(France) Henri Cochet	6	10	4	6	7

Final
1	(United States) Ellsworth Vines	6	6	6
(1)	(France) Henri Cochet	4	4	4

=== Earlier rounds ===
==== Section 1 ====
First round

Second round
1	(United States) Vines	6	6	6
(United States) Marks	0	1	0
(United States) Lavine
(United States) Hughes
(United States) Gledhill	6	6	6
(United States) Lawrence	2	1	1
(United States) Kurzrok	10	1	1	3
(6)	(France) Bernard	8	6	6	6

Third round
1	(United States) Vines	6	6	8	7
(United States) Lavine	1	0	10	5
(United States) Gledhill	8	6	2	6
(6)	(France) Bernard	6	4	6	3

Fourth round
1	(United States) Vines	6	6	6
(United States) Gledhill	1	3	1

==== Section 2 ====
First round

Second round
7	(United States) Mangin	6	6	6
(United States) Seligson	4	1	2
(United States) Little	0	3	3
(United States) Kamrath	6	6	6
(United States) McCauliff	5	6	1	3
(United States) Coughlin	7	2	6	6
(United States) Stoefen	3	6	6	1	7
(4)	(Japan) Satoh	6	1	4	6	5

Third round
7	(United States) Mangin	6	6	6
(United States) Kamrath	1	4	1
(United States) Coughlin	4	3	6	3
(United States) Stoefen	6	6	2	6

Fourth round
7	(United States) Mangin	4	6	4
(United States) Stoefen	6	8	6

==== Section 3 ====
First round
(United States) Murphy	6	1	4	6	7
(United States) Palmer	1	6	6	1	5
(Japan) Onda	3	5	1
(United States) Parker	6	7	6
(United States) Brown
(United States) Grant
(United States) Hill	2	1	3
(United States) Gilpin	6	6	6
(United States) McElevenny	6	7	3	9
(United States) Werner	1	9	6	11
(United States) O'Loughlin	1	1	2
(5)	(Japan) Kuwabara	6	6	6

Second round
4	(United States) Lott	6	6	6
(United States) Costa	3	4	4
(United States) Murphy	1	2	2
(United States) Parker	6	6	6
(United States) Grant	9	0	6	9	6
(United States) Gilpin	7	6	3	11	4
(United States) Werner	1	3	3
(5)	(Japan) Kuwabara	6	6	6

Third round
4	(United States) Lott	6	6	4	6
(United States) Parker	4	1	6	2
(United States) Grant	3	6	4	6	4
(8)	(Japan) Kuwabara	6	2	6	2	6

Fourth round
4	(United States) Lott	2	6	6	6
(5)	(Japan) Kuwabara	6	3	4	3

==== Section 4 ====
First round
6	(United States) Sutter	6	6	6
(United States) Fiala	4	1	1
(United States) Fischer	2	7	7	3	11
(United States) Frame	6	5	5	6	9
(United States) MacPherson	4	0	6	3
(United States) Jacobs	6	6	3	6
(United States) Davenport	6	0	9	4	6
(United States) Law	2	6	7	6	3
(United States) Tidball	6	6	6
(United States) Flaherty	3	1	2
(United States) Coggeshall	6	6	6
(United States) Simons	3	4	1
(United States) Lewis	3	4	6	1
(United States) Bell	6	6	1	6
(United States) Metz	1	2	3
(2)	(United Kingdom) Austin	6	6	6

Second round
6	(United States) Sutter	6	6	6
(United States) Fischer	0	1	2
(United States) Jacobs	6	7	6
(United States) Davenport	4	5	4
(United States) Tidball	6	6	6	6	6
(United States) Coggeshall	3	4	8	8	4
(United States) Bell	2	6	3	3
(2)	(United Kingdom) Austin	6	4	6	6

Third round
6	(United States) Sutter	6	6	7
(United States) Jacobs	3	3	5
(United States) Tidball	4	6	2
(2)	(United Kingdom) Austin	6	8	6

Fourth round
6	(United States) Sutter	6	6	7
(2)	(United Kingdom) Austin	2	0	5

==== Section 5 ====
First round
2	(United States) Allison	6	7	6
(United States) Verstraten	4	5	3
(United States) Watt	3	6	6	8	6
(United States) MacGuffin	6	3	2	10	2
(United States) Buxby	3	3	6	6	6
(United States) Hartford	6	6	1	4	3
(United States) Fischer	4	3	7	6	6
(United States) Herndon	6	6	5	3	2
(United States) Jones	6	6	6
(United States) Milstein	1	4	4
(United States) Major	7	6	6
(United States) Longcope	5	3	4
(United States) Donovan	0	0	2
(United States) Partridge	6	6	6
(United States) Goeltz	2	3	2
(8)	(United Kingdom) Avory	6	6	6

Second round
2	(United States) Allison	6	6	6
(United States) Watt	4	3	4
(United States) Buxby	6	6	6
(United States) Fischer	4	3	4
(United States) Jones	6	6	11
(United States) Major	4	3	9
(United States) Partridge	9	4	5	4
(8)	(United Kingdom) Avory	7	6	7	6

Third round
2	(United States) Allison	6	9	6
(United States) Buxby	3	7	2
(United States) Jones	4	6	4	7	8
(8)	(United Kingdom) Avory	6	1	6	5	10

Fourth round
2	(United States) Allison	6	6	6
(8)	(United Kingdom) Avory	4	1	3

==== Section 6 ====
First round
5	(United States) Wood	6	6	6
(United States) Jones	0	3	1
(United States) Jenkins	6	6	6
(United States) Bennett	2	3	1
(Japan) Yamagishi	6	7	2	2	2
(United States) Hall	3	5	6	6	6
(United States) Colton	5	0	1
(United States) Bowman	7	6	6
(United States) Hecht	6	4	4
(United States) Williams	8	6	6
(United States) Burns	20	6	6
(United States) Yeomans	18	1	3

Second round
5	(United States) Wood	6	6	6
(United States) Jenkins	1	2	3
(United States) Hall	6	6	6
(United States) Bowman	4	1	1
(United States) Williams	3	8	6	3	9
(United States) Burns	6	6	4	6	7
(United States) Lang	4	2	6	0
(3)	(United Kingdom) Perry	6	6	4	6

Third round
5	(United States) Wood	7	8	6
(United States) Hall	5	6	4
(United States) Williams	0	2	1
(3)	(United Kingdom) Perry	6	6	6

Fourth round
5	(United States) Wood	3	4	6	6	7
(3)	(United Kingdom) Perry	6	6	0	0	5

==== Section 7 ====
First round

Second round
3	(United States) Shields	6	6	6
(United States) Hawley	2	0	0
(United States) Nannes	3	1	1
(United States) Mercur	6	6	6
(United States) Bowden	6	6	6
(United States) DeMott	2	1	1
(United States) Berger	5	3	2
(7)	(United Kingdom) Olliff	7	6	6

Third round
3	(United States) Shields	10	6	7
(United States) Mercur	8	3	5
(United States) Bowden	1	4	1
(7)	(United Kingdom) Olliff	6	6	6

Fourth round
3	(United States) Shields	6	4	6	6
(7)	(United Kingdom) Olliff	3	6	1	2

==== Section 8 ====
First round

Second round
7	(United States) Van Ryn	6	6	6
(United States) Martin	2	3	4
(United States) Aranha	2	3	0
(United States) Feibleman	6	6	6
(United States) Rosenbaum	0	3	0
(Spain) Alonso	6	6	6
(United States) Hess	6	2	3
(1)	(France) Cochet	8	6	6

Third round
7	(United States) Van Ryn	6	5	6	6
(United States) Feibleman	1	7	0	3
(Spain) Alonso	2	4	1
(1)	(France) Cochet	6	6	6

Fourth round
7	(United States) Van Ryn	5	3	6
(1)	(France) Cochet	7	6	8

Preceded by 1932 Wimbledon Championships	Grand Slams; Men's Singles	Succeeded by 1933 Australian Championships
