= 1931 U.S. National Championships – Men's singles =

Men's singles
- 1931 U.S. National Championships

Final
- Champion: (United States) Ellsworth Vines
- Runner-up: (United States) George Lott
- Score: 7–9, 6–3, 9–7, 7–5

Events
Singles	men	women
Doubles	men	women
- U.S. National Championships

First-seeded Ellsworth Vines defeated fourth-seeded George Lott 7–9, 6–3, 9–7, 7–5 in the final to win the men's singles tennis title at the 1931 U.S. National Championships.

== Seeds ==
The tournament used two lists of eight players for seeding the men's singles event; one for U.S. players and one for foreign players. Ellsworth Vines is the champion; others show the round in which they were eliminated.

1. (United States) Ellsworth Vines (champion)
2. (United States) Frank Shields (quarterfinals)
3. (United States) Sidney Wood (third round)
4. (United States) George Lott (finalist)
5. (United States) John Doeg (semifinals)
6. (United States) Clifford Sutter (fourth round)
7. (United States) John Van Ryn (quarterfinals)
8. (United States) Wilmer Allison (second round)
1. (United Kingdom) Fred Perry (semifinals)
2. (France) Christian Boussus (fourth round)
3. (United Kingdom) George P. Hughes (third round)
4. (France) Jacques Brugnon (second round)
5. (Canada) Jack Wright (first round)
6. (Canada) Marcel Rainville (first round)
7. (France) Marcel Bernard (second round)
8. (France) Andre Merlin (third round)

== Draw ==
=== Finals ===
Quarterfinals
1	(United States) Ellsworth Vines	6	6	8
(United States) Berkeley Bell	1	4	6
(United States) Frank Bowden	2	3	4
(1)	(United Kingdom) Fred Perry	6	6	6
2	(United States) Frank Shields	2	9	6	6
5	(United States) John Doeg	6	11	4	8
4	(United States) George Lott	5	1	6	7	6
7	(United States) John Van Ryn	7	6	0	5	1

Semifinals
1	(United States) Ellsworth Vines	4	3	6	6	6
(1)	(United Kingdom) Fred Perry	6	6	4	4	3
5	(United States) John Doeg	5	3	0
4	(United States) George Lott	7	6	6

Final
1	(United States) Ellsworth Vines	7	6	9	7
4	(United States) George Lott	9	3	7	5

=== Earlier rounds ===
==== Section 1 ====
First round

Second round
1	(United States) Vines	6	6	6
(United States) Fischer	4	0	3
(United States) Jenkins	6	2	5	6
(United States) Wright	3	6	7	8
(United States) Tidball	4	6	10	2
(United States) Gilpin	6	1	12	6
(United States) Hall	4	6	5	6	8
(7)	(France) Bernard	6	2	7	3	6

Third round
1	(United States) Vines	6	6	6	6
(United States) Wright	3	3	8	2
(United States) Gilpin	0	6	3	1
(United States) Hall	6	0	6	6

Fourth round
1	(United States) Vines	6	6	7
(United States) Hall	2	3	5

==== Section 2 ====
First round

Second round
8	(United States) Allison	7	4	2	4
(United States) Bell	5	6	6	6
(United States) Blauer	6	6	7
(United States) Downing	2	1	5
(United States) Boehmer	w/	o
(United States) Bryan
(United States) Palmer	1	4	0
(3)	(United Kingdom) Hughes	6	6	6

Third round
(United States) Bell	6	6	6
(United States) Blauer	2	4	2
(United States) Bryan	2	6	6	8
(3)	(United Kingdom) Hughes	6	0	3	6

Fourth round
(United States) Bell	9	7	4	7
(United States) Bryan	7	5	6	5

==== Section 3 ====
First round
(United States) Donovan	6	11	3	4
(United States) Burwell	8	9	6	6
(United States) Buxby	6	6	3
(6)	(Canada) Rainville	0	1	0	rtd.

Second round
3	(United States) Wood	6	6	7
(United States) Davenport	2	4	5
(United States) Bowden	2	9	6	2	7
(United States) Burns	6	7	1	6	5
(United States) DeMott	9	6	6
(United States) Sheridan	7	4	3
(United States) Burwell	6	6	7
(United States) Buxby	1	1	5

Third round
3	(United States) Wood	6	0	8	3	3
(United States) Bowden	2	6	6	6	6
(United States) DeMott	3	0	3
(United States) Burwell	6	6	6

Fourth round
(United States) Bowden	7	4	6	6
(United States) Burwell	5	6	1	3

==== Section 4 ====
First round
6	(United States) Sutter	6	6	6
(United States) Stoefen	3	4	4
(United States) Coen	6	7	6
(United States) Feibleman	3	5	4
(Japan) Onda
(United States) Eggmann	w/	o
(United States) Fischer	2	6	7	3	5
(United States) Frame	6	2	5	6	7
(United States) Bowman	6	7	6
(United States) Verstraten	3	5	1
(United States) Van Alen	6	3	6	6
(United States) Crum Thompson	2	6	2	2
(United States) Tarangioli	6	5	6	6
(United States) Smith	2	7	4	0
(United States) Seligson	4	5	6	0
(1)	(United Kingdom) Perry	6	7	4	6

Second round
6	(United States) Sutter	6	6	4	6
(United States) Coen	4	4	6	3
(Japan) Onda	4	1	6
(United States) Frame	6	6	8
(United States) Bowman	6	6	6
(United States) Van Alen	2	0	2
(United States) Tarangioli	3	2	8
(1)	(United Kingdom) Perry	6	6	10

Third round
6	(United States) Sutter	6	6	6
(United States) Frame	1	4	4
(United States) Bowman	3	5	2
(1)	(United Kingdom) Perry	6	7	6

Fourth round
6	(United States) Sutter	6	4	3	3
(1)	(United Kingdom) Perry	4	6	6	6

==== Section 5 ====
First round
2	(United States) Shields	6	6	6
(Mexico) Sendel	1	0	1
(United States) Roll	6	4	3
(United States) Partridge	8	6	6
(United States) Jones	2	2	5
(United States) Barnes	6	6	7
(United States) Kamrath	6	6	6
(United States) Gonzales	0	0	0
(United States) Jones	6	6	6
(United States) Kunkel	3	4	4
(United States) Jennings	11	6	5	6
(United States) Fischer	9	3	7	2
(United States) Gledhill	5	6	6	6	6
(United States) Yeomans	7	4	4	8	4
(United States) Williams	3	6	6	7	8
(5)	(Canada) Wright	6	2	3	9	6

Second round
2	(United States) Shields	6	6	6
(United States) Partridge	3	4	1
(United States) Barnes	6	4	8	4	6
(United States) Kamrath	2	6	6	6	2
(United States) Jones	6	4	6	4	6
(United States) Jennings	4	6	1	6	4
(United States) Gledhill	6	6	7
(United States) Williams	1	2	5

Third round
2	(United States) Shields	6	6	6
(United States) Barnes	0	3	1
(United States) Jones	4	9	5
(United States) Gledhill	6	11	7

Fourth round
2	(United States) Shields	3	6	6	2	6
(United States) Gledhill	6	2	4	6	4

==== Section 6 ====
First round
5	(United States) Doeg	6	6	6
(United States) Werner	3	2	4
(United States) R. M. Watt	4	7	5
(United States) Jacobs	6	9	7

Second round
5	(United States) Doeg	6	1	2	6	6
(United States) Jacobs	4	6	6	0	3
(United States) Herndon	3	2	3
(United States) Griffin	6	6	5	rtd.
(United States) Green	2	3	5
(United States) Griffin	6	6	7
(United States) Grant	3	7	6	6
(4)	(France) Brugnon	6	5	3	4

Third round
5	(United States) Doeg	10	6	10	6
(United States) Herndon	8	3	12	3
(United States) Griffin	4	5	6	3
(United States) Grant	6	7	4	6

Fourth round
5	(United States) Doeg	6	4	6	6
(United States) Grant	0	6	2	1

==== Section 7 ====
First round

Second round
4	(United States) Lott	6	6	6
(United States) Murphy	3	3	3
(United States) Moore	0	3	2
(United States) Martin	6	6	6
(United States) Mangin	6	8	8
(United States) McCauliff	3	6	6
(United States) MacPherson	1	6	6	6	5
(8)	(France) Merlin	6	1	0	8	7

Third round
4	(United States) Lott	6	6	6
(United States) Martin	0	3	1
(United States) Mangin	6	6	6
(8)	(France) Merlin	3	2	1

Fourth round
4	(United States) Lott	6	6	6
(United States) Mangin	1	3	2

==== Section 8 ====
First round

Second round
7	(United States) Van Ryn	6	6	6
(United States) Loughlin	1	1	1
(United States) Law	8	4	6	3	1
(United States) Lavine	6	6	3	6	6
(United States) Lang	7	6	10
(United States) Kynaston	5	1	8
(United States) Kurzrok	6	3	10	1
(2)	(France) Boussus	2	6	12	6

Third round
7	(United States) Van Ryn	6	6	6
(United States) Lavine	3	0	3
(United States) Lang	3	6	2	1
(2)	(France) Boussus	6	3	6	6

Fourth round
7	(United States) Van Ryn	7	6	6
(2)	(France) Boussus	5	0	4

Preceded by 1931 Wimbledon Championships	Grand Slams; Men's Singles	Succeeded by 1932 Australian Championships
