= 1931 U.S. National Championships – Men's doubles =

Men's doubles
- 1931 U.S. National Championships

Final
- Champion: (United States) Wilmer Allison (United States) John Van Ryn
- Runner-up: (United States) Gregory Mangin (United States) Berkeley Bell
- Score: 6–4, 8–6, 6–3

Events
Singles	men	women
Doubles	men	women
← 1930 ·	U.S. National Championships	· 1932 →

The men's doubles tennis competition, part of the 1931 U.S. National Championships, was held from August 25 to September 2, 1931 on the outdoor grass courts at the Longwood Cricket Club in Chestnut Hill, MA, United States. Third-seeded Wilmer Allison and John Van Ryn defeated fourth-seeded Gregory Mangin and Berkeley Bell 6–4, 8–6, 6–3 in the final to win the title.

== Seeds ==
Nine teams of players were seeded for the men's doubles event; eight U.S. teams and one foreign team. Wilmer Allison and John Van Ryn were the champion; others show the round in which they were eliminated.

The eight seeded U.S. teams were:

1. (United States) George Lott / (United States) John Doeg (quarterfinals)
2. (United States) Ellsworth Vines / (United States) Keith Gledhill (quarterfinals)
3. (United States) Wilmer Allison / (United States) John Van Ryn (champions)
4. (United States) Gregory Mangin / (United States) Berkeley Bell (finals)
5. (United States) Frank Shields / (United States) Sidney Wood (quarterfinals)
6. (United States) Jack Tidball / (United States) Lester Stoefen (second round)
7. (United States) Eddie Jacobs / (United States) Wilbur Coen (quarterfinals)
8. (United States) Clifford Sutter / (United States) Bruce Barnes (semifinals)

The foreign seeded team was:

1. (United Kingdom) Fred Perry / (United Kingdom) George P. Hughes (quarterfinals)

== Draw ==
=== Finals ===
Quarterfinals
1	(United States) George Lott (United States) John Doeg	16	2	4	5
5	(United States) Frank Shields (United States) Sidney Wood	14	6	6	7
7	(United States) Eddie Jacobs (United States) Wilbur Coen	4	2	4
4	(United States) Gregory Mangin (United States) Berkeley Bell	6	6	6
3	(United States) Wilmer Allison (United States) John Van Ryn
(1)	(United Kingdom) Fred Perry (United Kingdom) George P. Hughes
8	(United States) Clifford Sutter (United States) Bruce Barnes	4	10	10	8	6
2	(United States) Ellsworth Vines (United States) Keith Gledhill	6	8	12	6	3

Semifinals
5	(United States) Frank Shields (United States) Sidney Wood	3	6	4	6	8
4	(United States) Gregory Mangin (United States) Berkeley Bell	6	4	6	3	10
3	(United States) Wilmer Allison (United States) John Van Ryn	6	6	6
8	(United States) Clifford Sutter (United States) Bruce Barnes	4	0	3

Final
4	(United States) Gregory Mangin (United States) Berkeley Bell	4	6	3
3	(United States) Wilmer Allison (United States) John Van Ryn	6	8	6
