= 1933 U.S. National Championships – Men's singles =

Men's singles
- 1933 U.S. National Championships

Final
- Champion: (United Kingdom) Fred Perry
- Runner-up: (Australia) Jack Crawford
- Score: 6–3, 11–13, 4–6, 6–0, 6–1

Details
- Draw: 90
- Seeds: 16

Events
| Singles | men | women |
| Doubles | men | women |
| ← 1932 · | U.S. National Championships | · 1934 → |

Fred Perry defeated Jack Crawford 6–3, 11–13, 4–6, 6–0, 6–1 in the final to win the men's singles tennis title at the 1933 U.S. National Championships. It was Perry's first Grand Slam title overall, and the first of three U.S. Championships. Crawford was attempting to complete the Grand Slam.

== Seeds ==
The tournament used two lists of eight players for seeding the men's singles event; one for U.S. players and one for foreign players. Fred Perry is the champion; others show the round in which they were eliminated.

1. (United States) Ellsworth Vines (fourth round)
2. (United States) Frank Shields (semifinals)
3. (United States) Wilmer Allison (fourth round)
4. (United States) Clifford Sutter (quarterfinals)
5. (United States) Frank Parker (third round)
6. (United States) Sidney Wood (fourth round)
7. (United States) Lester Stoefen (semifinals)
8. (United States) Gregory Mangin (quarterfinals)
1. (Australia) Jack Crawford (finalist)
2. (United Kingdom) Fred Perry (champion)
3. (Japan) Jiro Satoh (fourth round)
4. (United Kingdom) Harry Lee (fourth round)
5. (Japan) Ryosuke Nunoi (fourth round)
6. (Australia) Vivian McGrath (fourth round)
7. (Japan) Eikichi Ito (second round)
8. (Australia) Adrian Quist (quarterfinals)

== Draw ==
=== Key ===
- Q = Qualifier
- WC = Wild card
- LL = Lucky loser
- Alt = Alternate
- ITF = ITF entry
- PR = Protected ranking
- SR = Special ranking
- SE = Special exempt
- JE = Junior exempt
- JR = Junior Accelerator Programme entrant
- CO = College Accelerator Programme entrant
- NG = Next Gen Accelerator Program entrant
- w/o = Walkover
- r = Retired
- d = Defaulted

=== Final eight ===
Quarterfinals
(United States) Bryan Grant | 6 | 4 | 6 | 5
7 | (United States) Lester Stoefen | 8 | 6 | 3 | 7
(8) | (Australia) Adrian Quist | 4 | 4 | 0
(2) | (United Kingdom) Fred Perry | 6 | 6 | 6
2 | (United States) Frank Shields | 6 | 6 | 4 | 6
8 | (United States) Gregory Mangin | 4 | 4 | 6 | 3
4 | (United States) Clifford Sutter | 3 | 3 | 4
(1) | (Australia) Jack Crawford | 6 | 6 | 6

Semifinals
7 | (United States) Lester Stoefen | 3 | 2 | 2
(2) | (United Kingdom) Fred Perry | 6 | 6 | 6
2 | (United States) Frank Shields | 5 | 4 | 3
(1) | (Australia) Jack Crawford | 7 | 6 | 6

Final
(2) | (United Kingdom) Fred Perry | 6 | 11 | 4 | 6 | 6
(1) | (Australia) Jack Crawford | 3 | 13 | 6 | 0 | 1

=== Earlier rounds ===
==== Section 1 ====
First round

Second round
1 | (United States) Vines | 6 | 6 | 6
(United States) Palmer | 1 | 2 | 2
(United States) Pratt | 2 | 1 | 3
(United Kingdom) Avory | 6 | 6 | 6
(United States) Grant | 8 | 6 | 6
(United States) Murphy | 6 | 3 | 4
(United States) O'Loughlin | 6 | 6 | 6
(7) | (Japan) Ito | 3 | 1 | 3

Third round
1 | (United States) Vines | 6 | 7 | 6
(United Kingdom) Avory | 3 | 5 | 1
(United States) Grant | 6 | 6 | 6
(United States) O'Loughlin | 0 | 2 | 0

Fourth round
1 | (United States) Vines | 3 | 3 | 3
(United States) Grant | 6 | 6 | 6

==== Section 2 ====
First round

Second round
7 | (United States) Stoefen | 6 | 7 | 6 | 6
(United States) Bowden | 3 | 5 | 8 | 3
(United States) Bell | 3 | 2 | 4
(Spain) Alonso-Areyzaga | 6 | 6 | 6
(United States) Case | 4 | 2 | 1
(United Kingdom) Wilde | 6 | 6 | 6
(United States) Culley | 2 | 6 | 1 | 2
(4) | (United Kingdom) Lee | 6 | 4 | 6 | 6

Third round
7 | (United States) Stoefen | 6 | 6 | 6
(Spain) Alonso-Areyzaga | 2 | 2 | 2
(United Kingdom) Wilde | 4 | 8 | 3 | 1
(4) | (United Kingdom) Lee | 6 | 6 | 6 | 6

Fourth round
7 | (United States) Stoefen | 6 | 6 | 6
(4) | (United Kingdom) Lee | 0 | 4 | 4

==== Section 3 ====
First round
(United States) Van Ryn | 6 | 6 | 6
(United States) Covington | 4 | 2 | 2
(United States) Law | 6 | 6 | 4 | 6
(United States) Fischer | 2 | 3 | 6 | 1
(United States) McCauliff | 6 | 6 | 6
(United States) Cameron | 3 | 0 | 3
(United States) Herndon | 6 | 6 | 6 | 4 | 6
(United States) Roll | 1 | 8 | 4 | 6 | 3
(8) | (Australia) Quist | 6 | 6 | 9
(United States) Hamm | 2 | 4 | 7

Second round
3 | (United States) Allison | 6 | 6 | 6
(United States) Kingman | 3 | 4 | 4
(United States) Lott | 1 | 0 | 0
(United States) Van Ryn | 6 | 6 | 6
(United States) Law | 3 | 2 | 4
(United States) McCauliff | 6 | 6 | 6
(United States) Herndon | 3 | 6 | 4 | 3
(8) | (Australia) Quist | 6 | 3 | 6 | 6

Third round
3 | (United States) Allison | 4 | 4 | 6 | 6 | 6
(United States) Van Ryn | 6 | 6 | 1 | 4 | 2
(United States) McCauliff | 2 | 1 | 6
(8) | (Australia) Quist | 6 | 6 | 8

Fourth round
3 | (United States) Allison | 1 | 3 | 2
(8) | (Australia) Quist | 6 | 6 | 6

==== Section 4 ====
First round
5 | (United States) Parker | 6 | 6 | 6
(United States) Verstraten | 3 | 1 | 2
(United States) Goeltz | 6 | 6 | 6
(United States) Challiss | 3 | 1 | 3
(United States) Gledhill | 7 | 7 | 6 | 6
(United States) Prusoff | 9 | 5 | 3 | 2
(United States) Kamrath | 6 | 7 | 6
(United States) Pitman | 1 | 5 | 4
(United States) Hecht | 7 | 6 | 6
(United States) Hendrix | 5 | 3 | 3
(United States) Williams | 6 | 7 | 7
(United States) Macguffin | 3 | 5 | 5
(United States) Bryan | 6 | 4 | 6 | 7
(United States) Hawley | 2 | 6 | 3 | 5
(2) | (United Kingdom) Perry | 6 | 6 | 6
(United States) Burns | 1 | 3 | 2

Second round
5 | (United States) Parker | 6 | 6 | 6
(United States) Goeltz | 0 | 2 | 4
(United States) Gledhill | 11 | 7 | 4 | 6
(United States) Kamrath | 9 | 5 | 6 | 4
(United States) Hecht | 2 | 6 | 7 | 0 | 6
(United States) Williams | 6 | 3 | 5 | 6 | 4
(United States) Bryan | 6 | 3 | 0 | 3
(2) | (United Kingdom) Perry | 3 | 6 | 6 | 6

Third round
5 | (United States) Parker | 6 | 3 | 9 | 3
(United States) Gledhill | 4 | 6 | 11 | 6
(United States) Hecht | 1 | 4 | 4
(2) | (United Kingdom) Perry | 6 | 6 | 6

Fourth round
(United States) Gledhill | 2 | 6 | 6 | 3 | 3
(2) | (United Kingdom) Perry | 6 | 4 | 1 | 6 | 6

==== Section 5 ====
First round
2 | (United States) Shields | 6 | 6 | 6
(United States) Donovan | 4 | 0 | 3
(United States) Nogrady | 6 | 6 | 2 | 6
(United States) Watt | 2 | 4 | 6 | 4
(United States) Hall | 6 | 6 | 6
(United States) White | 0 | 1 | 1
(Australia) Turnbull | 3 | 6 | 6 | 6
(United States) Bowman | 6 | 2 | 2 | 1
(United States) Lott | 6 | 4 | 6 | 6
(Canada) Watt | 1 | 6 | 3 | 1
(United States) Wood | 6 | 6 | 3 | 6
(United States) Washburn | 3 | 4 | 6 | 3
(United States) Gilpin | 6 | 6 | 8
(United States) Dickinson | 4 | 3 | 6
(5) | (Japan) Nunoi | 6 | 9 | 6
(United States) Jacobs | 3 | 7 | 2

Second round
2 | (United States) Shields | 6 | 6 | 6
(United States) Nogrady | 0 | 2 | 4
(United States) Hall | 6 | 5 | 4 | 4
(Australia) Turnbull | 4 | 7 | 6 | 6
(United States) Lott | 6 | 6 | 6
(United States) Wood | 2 | 0 | 1
(United States) Gilpin | 2 | 0 | 1
(5) | (Japan) Nunoi | 6 | 6 | 6

Third round
2 | (United States) Shields | 6 | 8 | 6
(Australia) Turnbull | 4 | 6 | 3
(United States) Lott | 7 | 6 | 1 | 1 | 2
(5) | (Japan) Nunoi | 5 | 1 | 6 | 6 | 6

Fourth round
2 | (United States) Shields | 7 | 6 | 6
(5) | (Japan) Nunoi | 5 | 2 | 3

==== Section 6 ====
First round
8 | (United States) Mangin | 6 | 6 | 6
(United States) Kurzrok | 3 | 1 | 4
(United States) Lavine | 4 | 6 | 5 | 6 | 6
(United States) Flynn | 6 | 4 | 7 | 2 | 3
(United States) Tilden | 2 | 6 | 7 | 6
(United States) Tilney | 6 | 4 | 5 | 1
(United States) McDiarmid | 6 | 6 | 6
(United States) Kelleher | 4 | 2 | 4
(United States) Griffin | 6 | 6 | 8
(United States) O'Loughlin | 1 | 4 | 6

Second round
8 | (United States) Mangin | 4 | 6 | 6 | 7
(United States) Lavine | 6 | 0 | 1 | 5
(United States) Tilden | 1 | 4 | 4
(United States) McDiarmid | 6 | 6 | 6
(United States) Griffin | 6 | 6 | 8
(United States) Hartman | 2 | 3 | 6
(United States) Lynch | 4 | 6 | 4
(3) | (Japan) Satoh | 6 | 8 | 6

Third round
8 | (United States) Mangin | 6 | 3 | 6 | 6
(United States) McDiarmid | 1 | 6 | 1 | 3
(United States) Griffin | 5 | 6 | 6 | 1 | 3
(3) | (Japan) Satoh | 7 | 4 | 2 | 6 | 6

Fourth round
8 | (United States) Mangin | 6 | 3 | 6 | 4 | 6
(3) | (Japan) Satoh | 2 | 6 | 3 | 6 | 2

==== Section 7 ====
First round

Second round
4 | (United States) Sutter | 6 | 6 | 6
(United States) Buxby | 4 | 3 | 2
(United States) Fischer | w/o
(Canada) Murray
(United States) De Mott | 4 | 6 | 3
(United States) Davenport | 6 | 8 | 6
(United States) Hines | 3 | 7 | 4 | 4
(6) | (Australia) McGrath | 6 | 5 | 6 | 6

Third round
4 | (United States) Sutter | 6 | 7 | 6
(Canada) Murray | 1 | 5 | 2
(United States) Davenport | 2 | 4 | 2
(6) | (Australia) McGrath | 6 | 6 | 6

Fourth round
4 | (United States) Sutter | 3 | 6 | 6 | 3 | 8
(6) | (Australia) McGrath | 6 | 4 | 3 | 6 | 6

==== Section 8 ====
First round

Second round
6 | (United States) Wood | 7 | 6 | 2 | 6
(United States) Coughlin | 5 | 2 | 6 | 2
(United States) Martin | 7 | 8 | 4
(United States) Mako | 9 | 10 | 6
(United States) Tidball | 6 | 3 | 6 | 6
(United States) Stanford | 1 | 6 | 2 | 3
(United States) Seligson | 4 | 3 | 1
(1) | (Australia) Crawford | 6 | 6 | 6

Third round
6 | (United States) Wood | 7 | 9 | 7 | 6
(United States) Mako | 5 | 7 | 9 | 3
(United States) Tidball | 2 | 8 | 2 | 5
(1) | (Australia) Crawford | 6 | 6 | 6 | 7

Fourth round
6 | (United States) Wood | 4 | 4 | 6 | 6
(1) | (Australia) Crawford | 6 | 6 | 2 | 8

| Preceded by 1933 Wimbledon Championships | Grand Slams; Men's Singles | Succeeded by 1934 Australian Championships |
