= Buffalo Indoor =

Defunct tennis tournament
- Tour: ILTF World Circuit
- Founded: 1923; 103 years ago
- Abolished: 1975; 51 years ago
- Location: Buffalo, New York, United States
- Venue: Buffalo Tennis & Squash Club
- Surface: Wood / Carpet / indoors

The Buffalo Indoor was a combined men's and women's ILTF affiliated indoor tennis tournament founded in 1923. Also known as the Buffalo Mid-Winter Indoor Invitation, and the Buffalo Indoor Championships in its early editions, it was played at the Buffalo Tennis & Squash Club, Buffalo, New York, United States until 1975 when it was discontinued.

== Past finals ==
=== Men's singles ===
(incomplete roll)

Year	Winner	Runner-up	Score
1923	(United States) Bill Tilden	(United States) Vinnie Richards	6–4, 4–6, 3–6, 6–3, 6–1
1924	(Spain) Manuel Alonso	(United States) Bill Tilden	6–4, 1–6, 6–1, 3–6, 6–4
1925	(United States) Bill Tilden (2)	(United States) Lawrence Rice	6–0, 6–4, 6–2
1926	(Spain) Manuel Alonso (2)	(United States) Arnold Jones	3–6, 6–3, 7–5, 6–4
1927	(United States) Bill Tilden (3)	(Spain) Manuel Alonso	11–9, 6–3
1928	(United States) Bill Tilden (4)	(United States) Arnold Jones	6–1, 6–2
1929	(United States) Francis Hunter	(United States) Julius Seligson	6–4, 6–4, 4–6, 6–4
1930	(United States) Julius Seligson	(United States) Frank Shields	3–6, 1–6, 6–4, 10–8, 6–3
1931	(United States) Francis Hunter (2)	(United States) J. Gilbert Hall	6–3, 7–5, 6–2
1932	(United States) Frank Shields	(United States) J. Gilbert Hall	10–8, 6–3, 4–6, 6–3
1933	(United States) Frank Shields (2)	(United States) Gregory Mangin	3–6, 4–6, 6–3, 6–3, 9–7
1934	(United States) Frank Shields (3)	(United States) Clifford Sutter	7–5, 6–4, 3–6, 6–4
1935	(United States) Berkeley Bell	(United States) Frank Bowden	6–4, 6–3
1936	(United States) J. Gilbert Hall	(United States) Frank Shields	6–4, 4–6, 3–6, 6–2, 6–4
1937	(United States) Frank Shields (4)	(United States) J. Gilbert Hall	6–4, 10–8
1938–1945	Tournament not held due to WWII		
1946	(United States) Don McNeill	(United States) Sidney Wood	7–5, 6–3
1947	(United States) Bill Talbert	(United States) Don McNeill	3–6, 6–4, 6–2
1948	(United States) Bill Talbert (2)	(United States) Sidney Wood	6–1, 6–2
1949	(United States) Bill Talbert (3)	(United States) Bill Vogt	7–5, 6–2
1950	(United States) Vic Seixas	(United States) Bill Talbert	6–4, 6–2
1952	(United States) Don McNeill (2)	(United States) Bill Talbert	2–6, 6–1, 7–5
1953	(United States) Fred Kovaleski	(United States) Irvin Dorfman	3–6, 6–1, 7–5
1954	(United States) Tony Trabert	(United States) Vic Seixas	6–4, 14–12
1955	(United States) Tony Trabert (2)	(United States) Vic Seixas	6–1, 6–3
1956	(Sweden) Ulf Schmidt	(United States) Sidney Schwartz	10–8, 13–11
1957	(United States) Eddie Moylan	(United States) Barry MacKay	6–4, 7–5
1958	(United States) Barry MacKay	(United States) Vic Seixas	6–1, 7–5
1959	(United States) Dick Savitt	(United States) Mike Franks	6–2, 6–4
1960	(United States) Barry MacKay (2)	(United States) Donald Dell	6–4, 9–7
1961	(United States) Dick Savitt (2)	(United States) Barry MacKay	6–2, 6–4
1962	(United States) Frank Froehling	(United States) Gene Scott	6–2, 4–6, 6–0
1963	(United States) Dennis Ralston	(United States) Whitney Reed	6–4, 10–8
1964	(United States) Dennis Ralston (2)	(United States) Tom Edlefsen	6–1, 6–1
1965	(United States) Dennis Ralston (3)	(United States) Gene Scott	7–5, 7–5
1966	(United States) Dennis Ralston (4)	(United States) Tom Edlefsen	6–3, 8–6
1967	(United States) Clark Graebner	(United States) Marty Riessen	3–6, 15–13, 6–0
1968	(United States) Clark Graebner (2)	(United States) Marty Riessen	8–6, 7–5
↓ Open era ↓
1969	(United States) Clark Graebner (3)	(United Kingdom) Mark Cox	2–6, 9–7, 8–6
1970	(United States) Clark Graebner (4)	(United States) Bob Lutz	6–4, 3–6, 9–7
1971	(United States) Tom Gorman	(United Kingdom) Peter Curtis	4–6, 6–4, 9–8
1972	(United States) Dick Stockton	(United States) Clark Graebner	6–1, 1–6, 6–1
1973	(United States) Mike Belkin	(United Kingdom) Geoff Paish	6–4, 6–7, 7–6
1974	(United States) Dick Stockton (2)	(United States) Bob Lutz	6–1, 1–6, 6–1
1975	(United States) Dick Stockton (3)	(United States) Marty Riessen	6–7, 7–6, 6–4

=== Women's singles ===
(incomplete roll)

Year	Winner	Runner-up	Score
1923	(Canada) Lois Moyes Bickle	(United States) Mrs. Robert LeRoy	6–4, 6–2
1924	(United States) Marie Wagner	(Canada) Lois Moyes Bickle	6–4, 6–4
1925	(United States) Mrs. J. Dallas Corbiere	(United States) Mrs. William Endicott	6–4, 6–1
1926	(United States) Martha Bayard	(United States) Edith Sigourney	6–2, 6–2
1928	(United States) Edith Sigourney	(United States) Mrs. J. Dallas Corbiere	4–6, 6–3, 6–2
1932	(United Kingdom) Joan Ridley	(United States) Alice Francis	6–3, 6–0
1957	(United States) Lois Felix	(United States) Kay Hubbell	6–3, 6–2
1958	(United States) Lois Felix (2)	(United States) Kay Hubbell	6–2, 6–1
1959	(United States) Lois Felix (3)	(United States) Kay Hubbell	6–2, 6–3
1961	(United States) Justina Bricka	(United States) Carol Hanks	10–8, 4–6, 9–7
1963	(United States) Carol Hanks	(United States) Mary-Ann Eisel	6–2, 6–2
1964	(United States) Carol Hanks (2)	(United States) Mary-Ann Eisel	6–3, 6–2
1965	(United States) Mary-Ann Eisel	(United States) Carol Hanks	6–4, 1–6, 6–4
