= Southern California Championships =

Defunct tennis tournament
- Founded: 1887
- Abolished: 1977 (men); 1979 (women)
- Editions: 93 (men); 95 (women)
- Location: Riverside (1887) combined Santa Monica (1888–1903) combined South Pasadena (1904) combined Long Beach (1905–1915) combined Los Angeles II (1919–1979)
- Surface: Asphalt / outdoor Hard / outdoor

The Southern California Championships and was a men's and women's hard court tennis tournament founded in 1887 as a joint men's & women's event.

The men's event ran until 1977, whilst the women's event continued till 1979.

It was held at various locations including Riverside (1887), then Santa Monica (1888–1903), then South Pasadena (1904), then Long Beach (1905–1920) and finally Los Angeles (1920–1979).

This event carried the tour designation Los Angeles II, whilst Los Angeles I referred to the Pacific Southwest Championships/Los Angeles Open

== History ==
On 19 March 1887, the Southern California Lawn Tennis Association was formed with the Hon. James Bettner as its first president. The Southern California Championships were founded in March 1887 and first staged on asphalt courts at the Casa Blanca Club, Riverside, California. In August 1887 a second tournament was organized that was won by William Henry Young after which the event would be played in the last week of August. In 1888 the tournament moved to the Santa Monica Casino courts, where it remained until 1903. The tournament alternated between different locations throughout its run.

In 1968, at the start of the Open era, it became an open event. The men's event remained known as the Southern California Championships until 1977 and was part of the Grand Prix Tennis circuit tour. The women's event continued as the Southern California Championships officially until 1979.

=== Men's event ===
The inaugural men's tournament was won by Canadian born later American citizen William Henry Young who defeated Mr C. Trevelia in the All Comer's Final. In 1968 the event became part of the International Tennis Federation independent tour. In 1970 the event became part of the Grand Prix Tennis Circuit tour until 1977. The final tournament was won by the Mexican player Raúl Ramírez who defeated the American player Brian Gottfried.

=== Women's event ===
The inaugural women's tournament was won by the American player Miss Fannie Shoemaker who defeated a Miss Dexter in the All Comer's Final.

In 1979 the final women's event was held that was won by Kelly Henry who defeated Lea Antonoplis.

== Locations ==
The tournament was staged in different cities for the duration of its run they included:

Venue	City	Years
Casa Blanca Club.	Riverside	1887
Santa Monica Casino Courts.	Santa Monica	1888 – 1903
	South Pasadena	1904
Hotel Virginia.	Long Beach	1905 – 1915
Los Angeles Tennis Club	Los Angeles	1919 – 1977

== Finals ==
=== Men's singles ===
Included:

Year	Location	Champion	Runner-up	Score
1887	Riverside	(United States) William Henry Young	(United States) C. Trevelia	
1887	Santa Monica	(United States) William Henry Young (2)	(United States) R. L. Bettner	
1888	Santa Monica	(United States) Robert Peyton Carter	(United States) William Henry Young	w.o.
1889	Santa Monica	(United States) Robert Peyton Carter (2)	(United States) A. Q. Twiss	6–3, 6–3, 6–3.
1890	Santa Monica	(United States) Robert Peyton Carter (3)	(United States) Kenneth (Ken) Carter	
1891	Santa Monica	(United States) Theodore Coulter	(United States) Robert Peyton Carter	w.o.
1892	Santa Monica	(United States) Robert Peyton Carter (4)	(United States) Theodore Coulter	w.o.
1893	Santa Monica	(United States) Robert Peyton Carter (5)	(United States) Martin A. Chase	6–0, 6–2, 7–5.
1894	Santa Monica	(United States) Robert Peyton Carter (6)	(United States) Arthur William Bumiller	6–4, 4–6, 6–2, 7–5
1895	Santa Monica	(United States) Arthur William Bumiller	(United States) Robert Peyton Carter	w.o.
1896	Santa Monica	(United States) Lewis Ransome Freeman	(United States) Arthur William Bumiller	6–3, 3–6, 6–0, 6–2
1897	Santa Monica	(United States) Lewis Ransome Freeman (2)	(United States) John Cravens	6–1, 6–1, 6–3
1898	Santa Monica	(United States) Lewis Ransome Freeman (3)	(United States) Oliver Richer	6–1, 3–6, 6–1, 6–1
1899	Santa Monica	(United States) Sumner Hardy	(United States) Lewis Ransome Freeman	w.o.
1900	Santa Monica	(United States) Alphonzo Bell Sr.	?	?
1901	Santa Monica	(United States) Alphonzo Bell Sr. (2)	(United States) Reuben Gay Hunt	6–2, 6–1, 6–0
1902	Santa Monica	(United States) Lewis Ransome Freeman (4)	(United States) Alphonzo Bell Sr.	6–3, 6–4, 6–2
1903	Santa Monica	(United States) Alphonzo Bell Sr. (3)	(United States) Lewis Ransome Freeman	w.o.
1904	Pasadena	(United States) Eugene Overton	(United States) Alphonzo Bell Sr.	w.o.
1905	Los Angeles	(United States) Eugene Overton (2)	(United States) Robert Henry Fauntleroy Variel jr	6–4, 3–6, 7–5, 6–2
1906	Los Angeles	(United States) Harold Hyde Braly Sr.	(United States) Nathaniel Borrodaille (Nat) Browne	7–5, 0–6, 6–4, 6–3
1907	Los Angeles	(United States) Melville H. Long		
1908	Long Beach	(United States) Tom Bundy	(United States) Melville H. Long	w.o.
1909	Long Beach	(United States) Wynn Mace	(United States) Tom Bundy	w.o.
1910	Long Beach	(United States) Wynn Mace (2)	(United States) Nathaniel Borrodaille (Nat) Browne	10–8, 4–6, 6–1, 3–6, 6–4
1911	Long Beach	(United States) Henry Ward Dawson	(United States) Wynn Mace	6–0, 6–1, 2–6, 6–2
1912	Long Beach	(United States) Paul Hardeman	(United States) William Amos Horrell	6–4, 6–2, 6–4
1913	Long Beach	(United States) Tom Bundy (2)	(United States) Willis Davis	6–1, 4–6, 12–10, 6–4
1914	Long Beach	(United States) Henry Ward Dawson	(United States) Alphonzo Bell Sr.	6–0, 6–2
1915	Long Beach	(United States) Roland Roberts	(United States) Tom Bundy	3–6, 3–6, 6–1, 6–2, 6–3
1919	Los Angeles	(United States) Howard Kinsey	?	?
1920	Los Angeles	(United States) Robert Kinsey	(United States) Harvey Snodgrass	6–4, 6–1, 6–4
1921	Los Angeles	(United States) Henry Parker	?	?
1922	Los Angeles	(United States) Harvey Snodgrass	(United States) Clifton Bradford Herd	6–3, 6–4, 6–2
1923	Los Angeles	(Spain) Manuel Alonso Areizaga	(United States) Ray Casey	7–5, 6–4
1924	Los Angeles	(United States) Bill Tilden	(United States) Alfred H. Chapin Jr.	?
1925	Los Angeles	(United States) Alan Herrington	(United States) Craig Biddle	6–3, 6–2, 6–2
1926	Los Angeles	(United States) Benjamin Gorchakoff	?	?
1927	Los Angeles	(United States) Gerald Stratford	?	?
1928	Los Angeles	(United States) Ben Gorchakoff (2)	(United States) Clinton Herd	6–2, 6–3
1929	Los Angeles	(United States) John Doeg	(United States) Ben Gorchakoff	7–9, 6–4, 6–2, 6–2
1930	Los Angeles	(United States) Ellsworth Vines	(United States) Keith Gledhill	6–2, 6–2, 6–2
1931	Los Angeles	(United States) Ellsworth Vines (2)	(United States) Alan David Herrington	3–6, 6–2, 6–3, 6–1
1932	Los Angeles	(United States) Lester Stoefen	(United States) Jack Tidball	6–4, 6–3, 18–16
1933	Los Angeles	(United States) Gene Mako	(United States) Keith Gledhill	0–6, 6–1, 6–3, 5–7, 6–0
1934	Los Angeles	(United States) Jack Tidball	(United States) Elbert Raymond Lewis	3–6, 7–5, 6–4, 6–4
1935	Los Angeles	(United States) Frank Shields	(United States) Gerald Porter Bartosh	6–4, 6–1, 6–0
1936	Los Angeles	(United States) Bobby Riggs	(United States) Charles Carr	6–4, 6–1, 7–5
1937	Los Angeles	(United States) Bobby Riggs (2)	(United States) Frank Shields	6–1, 7–5, 6–2
1938	Los Angeles	(United States) Joe Hunt	(United States) Jack Kramer	2–6, 6–2, 6–1, 7–5
1939	Los Angeles	(United States) Frank Parker	(United States) Gene Mako	w.o.
1940	Los Angeles	(United States) Ted Schroeder	(United States) Owen Anderson	2–6, 6–2, 7–5, 7–5
1941	Los Angeles	(United States) Frank Parker	(United States) Ted Schroeder	6–4, 6–2, 6–0
1942	Los Angeles	(United States) Jack Kramer	(United States) Frank Parker	6–2, 6–2, 11–9
1943	Los Angeles	(United States) Bob Falkenburg	(United States) George Druliner	6–3, 2–6, 6–0, 6–2
1944	Los Angeles	(United States) Jack Kramer (2)	(United States) Frank Parker	8–6, 8–6, 6–3
1945	Los Angeles	(United States) Elwood Cooke	(United States) William Reedy	6–2, 3–6, 6–0
1946	Los Angeles	(United States) Jack Kramer (3)	(United States) Frank Parker	8–6, 6–1, 9–7
1947	Los Angeles	(United States) Jack Kramer (4)	(United States) Frank Parker	4–6, 2–6, 11–9, 6–2, 7–5
1948	Los Angeles	(United States) Ted Schroeder (2)	(United States) Bob Falkenburg	6–3, 3–6, 7–5, 12–10
1949	Los Angeles	(United States) Ted Schroeder (3)	(United States) Pancho Gonzales	6–1, 6–0, 6–2
1950	Los Angeles	(United States) Tom Brown	(United States) Bob Falkenburg	5–7, 6–1, 3–6, 6–4, 6–3
1951	Los Angeles	(United States) Art Larsen	(United States) Ted Schroeder	6–8, 7–5, 7–5, 6–3
1952	Los Angeles	(United States) Art Larsen (2)	(United States) Tom Brown	6–2, 6–4, 6–3
1953	Los Angeles	(United States) Tony Trabert	(United States) Art Larsen	6–3, 6–3, 6–3
1954	Los Angeles	(United States) Herbert Flam	(United States) Hugh Stewart	6–1, 4–6, 6–1, 9–7
1955	Los Angeles	(United States) Tony Trabert (2)	(United States) Gilbert Shea	6–1, 6–1, 7–5
1956	Los Angeles	(United States) Gilbert Shea	(United States) Michael Green	6–1, 8–6, 2–6, 6–2
1957	Los Angeles	(Peru) Alex Olmedo	(United States) Herbert Flam	6–1, 6–3
1958	Los Angeles	(United States) Herbert Flam	(Peru) Alex Olmedo	8–6, 6–3, 2–6, 6–3
1959	Los Angeles	(United States) Mike Franks	(Peru) Alex Olmedo	6–4, 3–6, 0–6, 12–10, 7–5
1960	Los Angeles	(United States) Dennis Ralston	(Mexico) Rafael Osuna	6–2, 3–6, 6–3, 6–2
1961	Los Angeles	(Chile) Luis Alberto Ayala	(United States) Allen Fox	9–7, 3–6, 3–6, 7–5, 8–6
1962	Los Angeles	(Mexico) Rafael Osuna	(United States) Allen Fox	6–2, 5–7, 8–6, 6–2
1963	Los Angeles	(United States) Dennis Ralston (2)	(Mexico) Rafael Osuna	6–3, 6–4, 6–4
1964	Los Angeles	(United States) Dennis Ralston (3)	(United States) Arthur Ashe	6–3, 4–6, 6–1, 6–4
1965	Los Angeles	(United States) Dennis Ralston (4)	(United States) Arthur Ashe	8–6, 6–2
1966	Los Angeles	(United States) Arthur Ashe	(United States) Stan Smith	6–4, 6–2
1967	Los Angeles	(United States) Stan Smith	(United States) Allen Fox	7–5, 13-11
1968	Los Angeles	(United States) Stan Smith (2)	(United States) Dick Leach	6–3, 6–4
1969	Los Angeles	(United States) Stan Smith (3)	(United States) Bob Lutz	6–3, 6–4
1970	Los Angeles	(United States) Erik van Dillen	(United States) Allen Fox	6–2, 6–1
1971	Los Angeles	(United States) Pancho Gonzales	(United States) Jimmy Connors	3–6, 6–3, 6–3.
1972	Los Angeles	(United States) Pancho Gonzales (2)	(Peru) Alex Olmedo	6–3, 6–2
1973	Los Angeles	(United States) Bob Kreiss	(United States) Jeff Austin	7–6, 1–6, 7–6
1974	Los Angeles	(United States) Billy Martin	(United States) Gene Malin	7–6, 6–3
1975	Los Angeles	(United States) Brian Teacher	(Brazil) Joao Soares	6–2, 6–4
1976	Los Angeles	(United States) Charles (Buzz) Strode	(United States) Eliot Teltscher	6–0, 7–6
1977	Los Angeles	(Mexico) Raúl Ramírez	(United States) Brian Gottfried	7–5, 3–6, 6–4

== See also ==
- Pacific Southwest Championships – tournament held in Los Angeles from 1927 through 2012.

== Sources ==
- Ingersoll, Luther A. (1908). "XI: Outdoor Past Times". Ingersoll's century history, Santa Monica Bay cities: prefaced with a brief history of the state of California, a condensed history of Los Angeles County, 1542 to 1908. Los Angeles: Los Angeles County CA Archives.
- Los Angeles Herald, Volume 42, Number 128, 17 August 1894: Center for Biographical Studies and Research: California Digital Newspapers Collection.
- Yeoman's, Patricia Henry (1987). Southern California Tennis Champions Centennial, 1887-1987: Documents & Anecdotes. Southern California Committee for the Olympic Games. ISBN 9780960662807.
