= J. Gilbert Hall =

American tennis player (1898–1977)

- Full name: J. Gilbert Hall
- Country (sports): United States
- Born: January 1, 1898 Springfield, New Jersey
- Died: September 7, 1977; Age:79 New York City, U.S.A.
- Plays: Right-handed (one-handed backhand)

Singles
- Career record: 259-181
- Career titles: 39
- Highest ranking: 8 (1935 USTA)

J. Gilbert Hall (1898 – September 7, 1977), known as "Gil" Hall, was an American tennis player. In a long tennis career, he won 39 singles titles between 1926 and 1940. Hall was known for his strong forehand stroke, described by Allison Danzig of the N.Y. Times as a "trenchant forehand".

Hall was ranked by the USLTA as the U.S. No. 8 for 1935 and the U.S. No. 10 for 1944 at the age of 46 years.

== Career ==
J. Gilbert Hall won the Northern New Jersey Championships in 1926 at Westfield, N.J. defeating Gregory Mangin in the final.

Hall won the Canadian Covered Courts Championships in January 1929 at the Montreal Indoor Tennis Club defeating the defending champion George Lott in the semi-final in four long sets and then defeating Canadian Willard Crocker in the final in four sets.

Hall formed a doubles partnership with Fritz Mercur with whom he won the U.S. Clay Court Championships in doubles in 1929. Hall was the runner-up in singles in the 1929 U.S. Clay Court Championships losing a five set final to Emmett Paré.

At the Southampton Invitation Championships in 1930 he lost a close third round match to Bill Tilden.

Hall was runner-up to Fred Perry at the 1931 Eastern Grass Court Championships at Rye, New York, losing a long five set final.

He won the Canadian Covered Courts Championships indoor tournament in Montreal for a second time in January 1932, defeating George Lott, the ranking U.S. No. 2 player at that time, in the semi-final in five long sets and Berkeley Bell in the final in three straight sets. Hall teamed with Fritz Mercur to win the doubles title as well.

Hall won the Eastern Clay Court Championships at the Jackson Heights Tennis Club in Queens, New York City in 1933 defeating Frank Shields, the U.S. No. 1 player for that year, in the final in three straight sets. He defended his Eastern Clay Court title in 1934 defeating Clifford Sutter in the final in three straight sets.

Hall won the Pelham Invitation tournament in New York City in February 1935 defeating Bell in the final.

He won The Greenbrier resort autumn tournament in White Sulphur Springs, W.V. in 1931, 1935, and 1936. In February 1936 he won the Buffalo Indoor title against Gregory S. Mangin.

Hall won the United North and South tournament at the Pinehurst Resort in 1937 defeating Wayne Sabin in the final in three straight sets.

In July, 1938 Hall won the Nassau Bowl Championships in Glen Cove, Long Island on grass defeating Frank Kovacs in the semifinal and defending champion Gilbert Hunt in the final. The match between the 40-year-old Hall and the 18-year-old Kovacs, the new rising star on the tennis circuit, was described by Allison Danzig in the N.Y. Times, "... the Jersey veteran fought like a lion and kept on fighting when fatigue was settling in . . . No one suspected Hall capable of playing such tennis at this stage in his career. It was a masterpiece of stroke production and tactics.”

Hall experienced some difficult opposition at the U.S. National Tennis Championships at Forest Hills, N.Y. In 1931 he lost against the eventual champion that year Ellsworth Vines in the fourth round. He lost to Sidney Wood at the 1932 U.S. National in three straight sets. However he had substantial leads over Wood in early round matches in the 1935, 1936, and 1938 championships, only to lose all three matches in a close five sets.

He defeated Guillermo Lemus of Mexico in the second round of the 1954 River Oaks Championships on clay in Houston, Texas at the age of 56 years.

Hall won seven straight veteran age 35+ titles from 1944 to 1950 inclusive without the loss of a single set.

== Rankings ==
Hall was ranked by the USLTA as the U.S. No. 8 for 1935 and the U.S. No. 10 for 1944 at the age of 46 years.

Hall concentrated his playing time in the eastern U.S. and played little tennis elsewhere in the U.S. and none at all in Europe. He did not appear in Davis Cup play. His restricted playing schedule affected his rankings.

== Personal life ==
J. Gilbert Hall was born in Springfield, N.J., and was a resident of South Orange, New Jersey. He was employed mostly in Manhattan. From 1937 until his death in 1977, he worked as a sales representative for Pandick Press Inc., a major Manhattan financial printer.

One of his sisters married into British nobility.
