= Lenoir C. Wright =

American professor

Lenoir Wright
- Born: 1911; Charlotte, North Carolina, U.S.
- Died: March 18, 2003 (aged 92); Greensboro, North Carolina, U.S.

Academic background
- Education: University of North Carolina at Chapel Hill (BA); Harvard University (LLB); Columbia University (PhD)

Academic work
- Discipline: History
- Sub-discipline: Asian history Asian culture
- Institutions: University of North Carolina at Greensboro

Lenoir C. Wright (1911 – March 18, 2003) was an American academic and attorney who taught Asian history and culture at University of North Carolina at Greensboro.

== Early life and education ==
Wright was born in Charlotte, North Carolina in 1911. From 1929 to 1933, he attended the University of North Carolina at Chapel Hill, where he played varsity tennis. Wright reached the third round of the 1931 United States Tennis Championship, and was defeated by Ellsworth Vines. He received his law degree from Harvard Law School in 1938. He worked for two years as an attorney and then returned to school, earning a doctorate in history from Columbia University.

== Career ==
Wright served with the United States Navy from 1943 through 1946. During that time, he developed an interest in Asia, especially in Japanese affairs.

Wright came to UNC Greensboro in 1953 (then known as Women's College) and taught Asian history and culture. Grants from the Fulbright Program enabled him to teach in Iraq and India. He wrote "United States Policy Toward Egypt, 1830-1914" which was published in 1969. Through frequent travels to Asia, Wright systematically built a collection of Japanese woodblock prints and scrolls, as well as Indian and Persian Miniatures. He donated his collection to UNCG's Weatherspoon Art Museum, where he was a lifelong member of the board of the Weatherspoon Gallery Association and the Musical Arts Guild. The Weatherspoon's Lenoir C. Wright Collection of Japanese Prints has more than 450 prints, primarily from the eighteenth and nineteenth centuries. One hundred highlights from the collection were featured in the exhibition Inside the Floating World in the fall of 2002.
