= Lewis White (tennis) =

American tennis player

- Full name: Lewis Nelson White
- Country (sports): United States
- Born: September 13, 1904 Round Rock, Texas, U.S.
- Died: July 18, 1981 (aged 76) Houston, Texas, U.S.

Singles

Grand Slam singles results
- US Open: 2R (1926)

Doubles

Grand Slam doubles results
- US Open: F (1929)

Lewis Nelson White (September 13, 1904 – July 18, 1981) was an American tennis player.

Born on the outskirts of Austin in Round Rock, Texas, White attended Austin High School and studied law at the University of Texas. While at the University of Texas he won two Southwest Conference singles titles and was the intercollegiate doubles champion in both 1923 and 1924 (with Louis Thalheimer). Having been ranked as high as two nationally as a junior, White attained the best national ranking of sixth in men's tennis. He partnered with Berkeley Bell to make the doubles final of the 1929 U.S. National Championships.

White, a lawyer by profession, was a 1981 inductee into the Texas Tennis Hall of Fame.

== Grand Slam finals ==
=== Doubles (1 runner-up) ===
| Result | Year | Championship | Surface | Partner | Opponents | Score |
|---|---|---|---|---|---|---|
| Loss | 1929 | U.S. National Championships | Grass | (United States) Berkeley Bell | (United States) George Lott (United States) John Doeg | 8–10, 6–1, 4–6, 1–6 |
