= David Jones (tennis) =

American tennis player

- Full name: David N. Jones Jr
- Country (sports): United States
- Height: 6 ft 4 in (193 cm)

Singles

Grand Slam singles results
- Wimbledon: 4R (1933, 1934)
- US Open: 3R (1929, 1931, 1932, 1936)

David N. Jones Jr was an American tennis player of the 1920s and 1930s.

Raised in New York, Jones attended Columbia University and was an all-round sportsperson, competing in various varsity sports. He rowed on the freshman crew and as a basketball player was twice named as a guard on the Eastern Collegiate League All-Star team. In the last of his four seasons of basketball he topped the league in scoring. He also captained the varsity tennis team and was an Eastern collegiate singles champion.

Jones, who ranked as high as 10th in the United States, had a win in 1932 over Fred Perry in Newport and at the same tournament took the world's leading player Ellsworth Vines to five sets.

After leaving Columbia University he continued his studies at Clare College, Cambridge University in 1932. During this period he competed on the local circuit, winning titles such as the Irish Championships and Kent Championships.

A big serving player, Jones managed 44 aces in his second round loss to Wilmer Allison at Wimbledon in 1936, before going on to claim the consolation All England Plate. He reached the Wimbledon fourth round on two occasions.
