= Jack Tidball =

American tennis player

- Country (sports): United States
- Died: June 8, 2000 (aged 88)
- Plays: Right-handed

Singles
- Career record: 82-71
- Career titles: 14

Grand Slam singles results
- US Open: 3R (1932, 1933, 1934)

Jack Tidball was an American tennis player. He won the 1936 Canadian Open Championships. He won the 1938 Long Beach tournament defeating Don Budge in a close final.

== Tennis career ==
Active in the 1930s, Tidball was a leading player in collegiate tennis for the UCLA Bruins. He was the 1933 national intercollegiate champion, which made him the first Bruin to win the title. He won the 1934 Eastern Intercollegiate Championships defeating Gene Mako in a close five set final.

His 1933 season also included a win over Ellsworth Vines at the Pacific Southwest Championships and a U.S. Clay Court doubles championship.

He won the Southern California Championships in 1934 defeating Bobby Riggs in the quarterfinal.

In 1936 he won the Canadian Championships, in the final defeating John Murio of Hawaii, who had won the 1933 Canadian title.

Tidball won the Ojai Tennis Tournament in 1936 (defeating Wayne Sabin in the final), in 1937 (the final a w.o. against Riggs), in 1938 (defeating William Doeg in the final), and in 1939 (defeating Thomas Chambers in the final).

In October 1938 he won the Long Beach Championships at the Hotel Virginia with a close three set win over Don Budge in the final. Budge had won the first Grand Slam that same year.

Tidball's two sons were college tennis players as well. His youngest son Steve competed for UCLA, while elder son John was a USC player. Both featured at tour level.
