= Eugene McCauliff =

American tennis player

- Full name: Eugene Henry McCauliff
- Country (sports): United States
- Born: January 24, 1909 Yonkers, New York
- Died: August 13, 1984 (aged 75)

Grand Slam singles results
- Wimbledon: 1R (1930)
- US Open: 3R (1932, 1933)

Eugene Henry McCauliff (January 24, 1909 – August 13, 1984) was an American tennis player.

Based in Yonkers, McCauliff played collegiate tennis for Fordham University.

McCauliff was a four-time national indoor doubles champion and featured at Wimbledon in 1930.

His best performance at the U.S. national championships was a third-round appearance in 1933, which he almost repeated the next year, pushing number two seed Wilmer Allison to five sets in a second-round match. Allison went on to reach the final.

At the Cincinnati Open, he made two appearances (1936 and 1937), amassed a 6-2 singles record, and reached the quarterfinals both years.

At the Mason & Dixon tournament in 1932 he had an upset win over U.S. Davis Cup player John Van Ryn.

In 1940 he was married to wife Katherryn (nee Hernan).
