= Karl Kamrath =

American architect and tennis player

- Born: April 25, 1911; Enid, Oklahoma, U.S.
- Died: January 29, 1988 (aged 76); Houston, Texas, U.S.
- Education: Bachelor of Architecture, 1934
- Alma mater: University of Texas
- Occupation: Architect
- Spouse(s): Eugenie Sampson (1934-1975), Gardina McCarthy (1977-1988)

Karl Kamrath FAIA (April 25, 1911 – January 29, 1988) was an American architect and tennis player. He, along with Frederick James MacKie, Jr., created the Houston-based architectural firm Mackie and Kamrath. The firm's buildings reflected the principles of Organic Architecture and Usonian architecture, an outcome of Kamrath's friendship with Frank Lloyd Wright. His career spanned over five decades during which he designed residential, commercial, institutional and government buildings. Prior to founding MacKie and Kamrath, Karl Kamrath worked for Pereira and Pereira, the Interior Studios of Marshall Field and Company, and the Architectural Decorating Company in Chicago, Illinois.

Karl Fred Kamrath was born in Enid, Oklahoma to Gottlieb Albert and Martha Kreplin Kamrath on April 25, 1911. While still a child, Kamrath's family moved to Austin, Texas. Throughout his life, Kamrath was an avid tennis player, and married fellow tennis player Eugenie Sampson on June 27, 1934, while they both singles quarterfinalists in the Cincinnati Open. That same year that he graduated the University of Texas with a Bachelor's degree in architecture. In 1955, Karl Kamrath was elected as a fellow of the American Institute of Architects (AIA), an organization he was affiliated with since 1939. He became the Houston AIA chapter president in 1960 and acted as the chairman of the Frank Lloyd Wright Memorial Committee from 1960 to 1962. He was inducted into the University of Texas Longhorn Hall of Fame in 1978 and the Texas Tennis Hall of Fame in 1984.

== Major Buildings ==
- Phyllis Wheatley High School, Houston (1948)
- Temple Emanu-El, Houston (1949, with Lenard R. Gabert)
- Emerson Unitarian Universalist Church, Houston (1975)
- Houston Contemporary Arts Association Museum (1949, demolished)
- Dow Chemical Company complex, Freeport (1953)
- Schlumberger Corporation complex (1953) now University of Houston Energy Research Center
- Humble Oil Research Center, Houston (1954) (demolished 2017)
- St. John the Divine Church, Houston (1954, with H. A. Salisbury)
- University of Texas M.D. Anderson Hospital and Tumor Institute (1954, altered), featured in TIME magazine in December 1954
- Commercial Standard Insurance Company Building, Fort Worth (1956)
- Farnsworth and Chambers Building (1957) an early office facility for NASA and Project Mercury, now Houston Parks Gragg Building
- Memorial Drive Presbyterian Church, Bunker Hill Village, Houston (1957, 1973)
- Temple Rodef Shalom, Waco (1962)
- First Pasadena State Bank Building, Pasadena, Texas (1962)
- Science and Research Building, University of Houston (1968)
- Travertine Nature Center, Chickasaw National Recreation Area. Sulphur, Oklahoma (1968)
- Big Three Industries Building, Houston (1974)
- Kamrath Second Residence, on Tiel Way in River Oaks, Houston (1953)
- George P. Mitchell house, Piney Point Village (1963, demolished), profiled in Fortune Magazine
- C.B. Ellis house, on Green River Trail in Ft. Worth, Texas (1966)
