= John Doeg =

American tennis player (1908–1978)

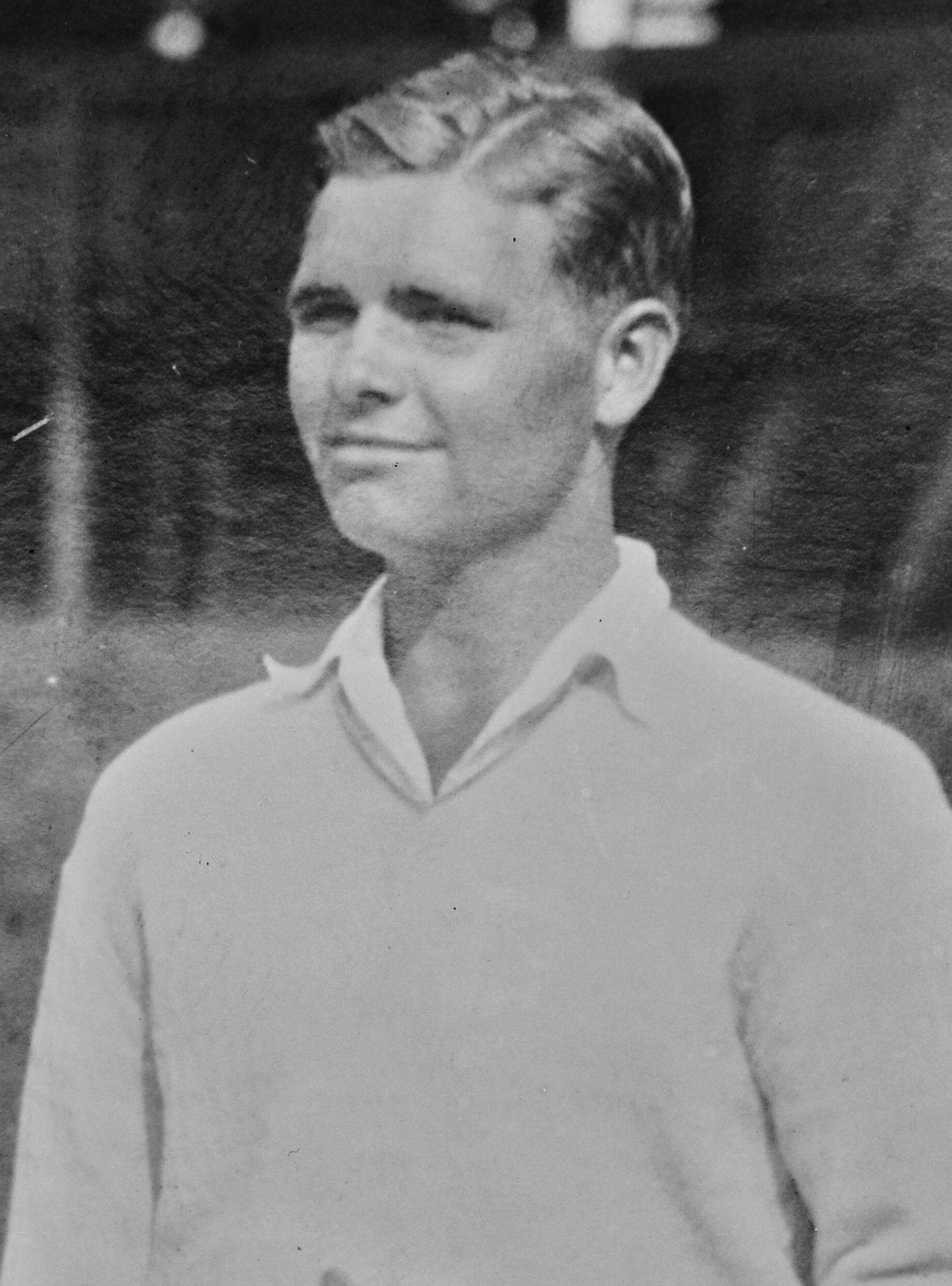
- Doeg in 1927
- Full name: John Thomas Godfray Hope Doeg
- Country (sports): United States
- Born: December 7, 1908 Guaymas, Sonora, Mexico
- Died: April 27, 1978 (aged 69) Redding, California, United States
- Height: 6 ft 1 in (1.85 m)
- Turned pro: 1927 (amateur tour)
- Retired: 1940
- Plays: Left-handed (one-handed backhand)
- Int. Tennis HoF: 1962 (member page)

Singles
- Highest ranking: No. 4 (1930)

Grand Slam singles results
- Wimbledon: SF (1930)
- US Open: W (1930)

Doubles

Grand Slam doubles results
- Wimbledon: F (1930)
- US Open: W (1929, 1930)

John Thomas Godfray Hope Doeg (December 7, 1908 – April 27, 1978) was a male tennis player from the United States.

In August 1929 Doeg won the singles title at the Seabright Invitational defeating Richard Norris Williams in three straight sets. About a year later, he fulfilled his promise and won his first and only major singles tournament, the 1930 U.S. National Championships at Forest Hills, defeating Frank Hunter in the quarterfinals, Bill Tilden in the semifinals and Frank Shields in the final in four sets. He proceeded to reach a career-high singles world ranking of No. 4 in the same year.

In 1962, he was inducted into the International Tennis Hall of Fame.

Doeg was the son of tennis player Violet Sutton and the nephew of Wimbledon and U.S. National singles tennis champion May Sutton. Born in Mexico, he became a U.S. citizen in 1933.

== Playing style ==
Although his name is not well known today, Doeg in his heyday often was considered among the premier servers in tennis history:

We are able, thanks to [Henri Cochet]'s conclusions, to study the deliveries of three great servers of the past few years—Tilden, Vines and Doeg. Opinions will vary as to their comparative effectiveness as well as some of their other qualities. Certainly no one will deny that in their services the three players named possessed assets of tremendous value. It would be of great interest to obtain opinions of the varying degree of game winning value possessed by each. There was this difference between the three men: Doeg’s service was his chief weapon, and once he had broken through an opponent, he was thought to be certain of winning that set. With Tilden and Vines the service was only one of many weapons, and it was employed intermittently and sometimes kept in reserve for time of need.

Don Budge in his book Budge on Tennis later stated the same sentiment:

McLoughlin was a terror in storming the net behind his service, and Doeg's left-handed service, one of the two or three best of all time, was so demoralizing that it constituted a mental hazard for his opponent. The latter was always harried with the thought that if he ever lost his own service, the set was gone, so seldom was anyone able to break through Doeg's. The story goes that in a Davis Cup test doubles match between Doeg and George Lott, and Tilden and Frank Hunter in 1928, Hunter, in the right court, never was able to return Doeg's service safely once in an entire set that went to 12-10, so cleverly did Doeg place it and so sharp a break did it take from the corner.

Budge, however, was careful to note the shortcomings of the rest of Doeg's game. In his 1969 memoir Budge observes "John never achieved the greatest stature in the sport because many facets of his game, his ground strokes, for instance, were somewhat lacking," then proclaimed Doeg "one of the most effective servers of all time":

The argument about who is the premier server is invariably restricted to include only Tilden, Vines, and Gonzales, but you should have seen Doeg. He did not hit it quite as hard as Vines, but with that big left-handed move, he came around with a slice that actually knocked the ball lopsided. I mean that. Doeg turned the ball into an ellipse, and try hitting that back. The players referred to it as "John's egg-ball." Besides, when Doeg's serve in the ad court bounced it would fly crazily off to the side, and no man could chase it down. If you did manage to get the ball back, just reaching the return carried you so far out of the court that there was no chance you could make it back in time to get Doeg's return. However, since John had little more proclivity for returning serve than losing serve, all his matches were forever running to 18-16. You never broke Doeg's serve. You outlasted it.

== Grand Slam finals ==
=== Singles (1 title) ===
Result	Year	Championship	Surface	Opponent	Score
Win	1930	U.S. Nationals Championships	Grass	(United States) Frank Shields	10–8, 1–6, 6–4, 16–14

=== Doubles (2 titles, 1 runner-up) ===
Result	Year	Championship	Surface	Partner	Opponents	Score
Win	1929	U.S. National Championships	Grass	(United States) George Lott	(United States) Berkeley Bell (United States) Lewis White	10–8, 16–14, 6–1
Loss	1930	Wimbledon Championships	Grass	(United States) George Lott	(United States) Wilmer Allison (United States) John Van Ryn	3–6, 3–6, 2–6
Win	1930	U.S. National Championships	Grass	(United States) George Lott	(United States) John Van Ryn (United States) Wilmer Allison	8–6, 6–3, 4–6, 13–15, 6–4

== Publication ==
In 1931, he wrote an educational tennis book titled "Elements of Lawn Tennis", with sportswriter Allison Danzig.
