= Donald M. Frame =

American professor and scholar

Donald M. Frame (1911 in Manhattan – March 8, 1991 in Alexandria, Virginia), a scholar of French Renaissance literature, was Moore Professor Emeritus of French at Columbia University, where he worked for half a century.

== Biography ==
Donald Murdoch Frame graduated from Harvard University in 1932 and earned a master's and a doctorate from Columbia University, writing his dissertation on Montaigne.

In World War II he served in the U.S. Navy.

== Personal life and views ==
Frame married Katherine Mailler Wygant, who died in 1972; they had two sons. In a second marriage he wed Kathleen Whelan.

Frame's scrupulous scholarship and erudition were widely admired. On April 19, 1968, he gave a Phi Beta Kappa Lecture at Vassar College entitled "Montaigne on the Absurdity and Dignity of Man"; the title epitomizes his interpretation of the 16th-century author to whom he devoted so much of his life.

== Published work ==
Donald Frame was a recognized authority on the works of Michel de Montaigne, whose Complete Works he published in translation in 1958. He also studied the works of François Rabelais, and published a book-length study of Gargantua and Pantagruel in 1977. A translation by Frame of Rabelais's complete works was published six months after his death. Frame also translated works by Moliere.

Harold Bloom calls Frame the best modern Montaigne scholar. While The Oxford Guide to Literature in English Translation (2000) praises Frame's accuracy, it also calls his translation "often obscure and awkward."
