= Cliff Sutter =

American tennis player

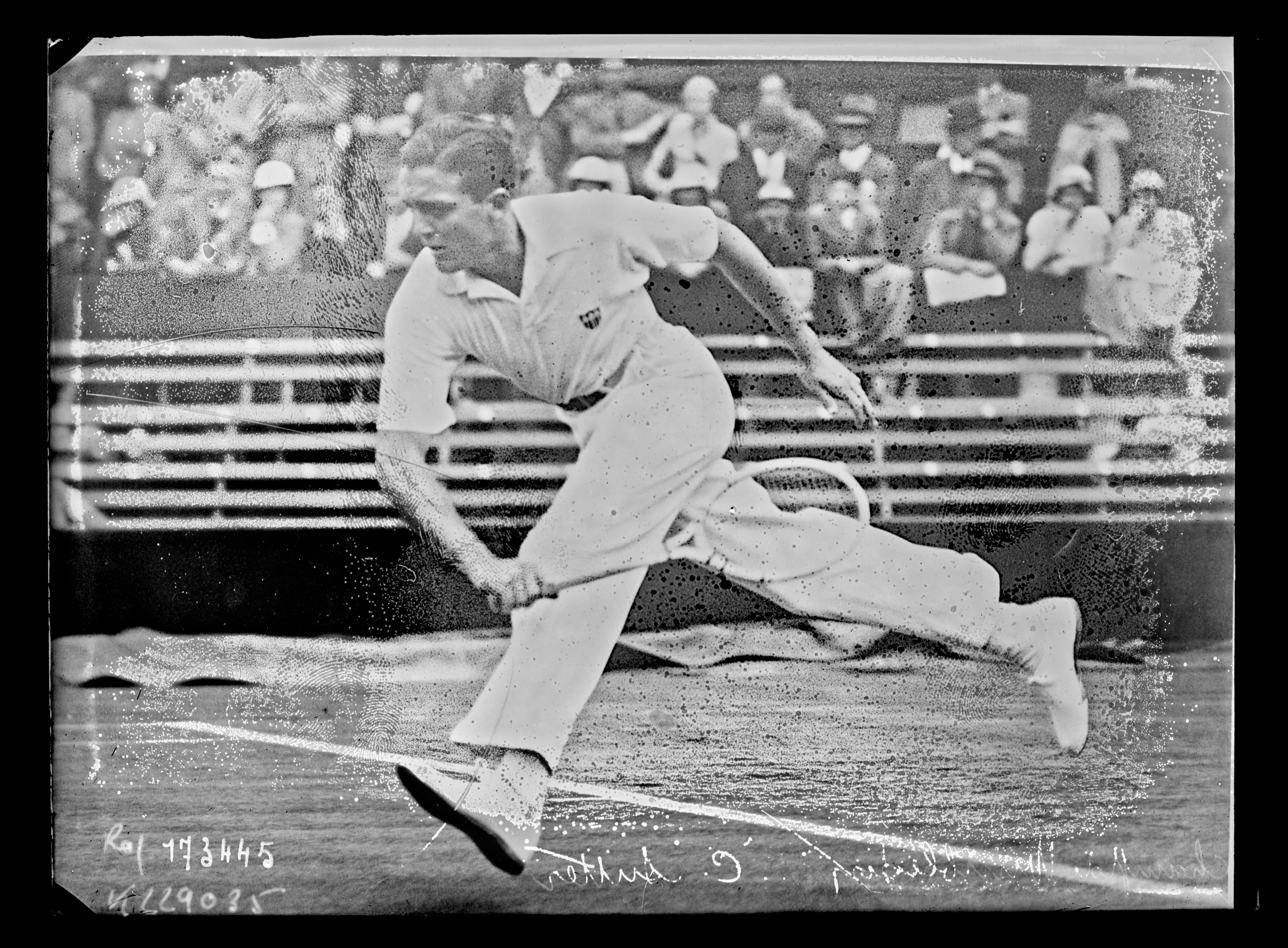
- Sutter, at the 1933 Wimbledon Championships
- Full name: Clifford Samuel Sutter
- Country (sports): United States
- Born: August 31, 1910 New Orleans, Louisiana
- Died: May 24, 2000 (aged 89) Barnstable, Massachusetts
- Plays: Right-handed (one-handed backhand)

Singles
- Career record: 108-51
- Career titles: 22
- Highest ranking: No. 5 (1932, A. Wallis Myers)

Grand Slam singles results
- Wimbledon: 4R (1933)
- US Open: SF (1932)

Grand Slam doubles results
- Wimbledon: 3R (1933)
- US Open: SF (1931)

Clifford Samuel Sutter (August 31, 1910 – May 24, 2000) was an American tennis player. At the U.S. National Championships, Sutter reached the semifinals in 1932, which he lost in five sets to world no. 1 and eventual champion Ellsworth Vines. He reached the quarterfinals in 1930, 1933 and 1934. Sutter was ranked world no. 5 for 1932 by A. Wallis Myers of The Daily Telegraph.

== Personal life ==
Clifford Sutter was born in New Orleans, Louisiana, to Fred W. Sutter, who died December 17, 1943, and resided at 5526 Loyola Avenue, New Orleans.

Fred W. Sutter was a bakery owner who, with the help of neighbors with whom he wished to play tennis, built his own grass tennis court on two vacant lots adjacent to Sutter's property on Loyola (formerly Franklin) Avenue in New Orleans, and Fred W. Sutter's sons Eddie, Cliff and Ernie grew up from early childhood playing on that court. Cliff Sutter became the only male New Orleanian to play the main draw singles at Wimbledon, in 1933, where he beat Germany's Baron Gottfried von Cramm (who would later win the French Championship twice, 1934 & '36, reach the Wimbledon final twice, 1935 & '36, and the U.S. final once, 1937). Cliff's younger brother Ernie, who like Cliff won the Intercollegiate singles twice in the 1930s, was severely wounded while serving in the U.S. Army in North Africa in 1943 during WWII, curtailing his tennis career. Ernie became a top lawyer with Shell Oil Co. after the war and eventually made a tennis comeback, winning the U.S. Veterans' Doubles Championship at the Longwood Cricket Club in Boston with his brother Cliff in 1961.

== Tennis career ==
Sutter played his collegiate tennis at Tulane University, where he won the NCAA singles championship in 1930 and 1932. In 1931, he won the singles championship and was a doubles finalist at the Tri-State Tennis Tournament (current Cincinnati Masters), defeating Bruce Barnes in the singles final. He also won the doubles title in Cincinnati in 1930 with his long-time tennis partner Maurice "Dukey" Bayon.

At the U.S. National Championships, Sutter reached the semifinals in 1932, which he lost in five sets to world no. 1 and eventual champion Ellsworth Vines. He reached the quarterfinals in 1930, 1933 and 1934.

In 1930, Sutter won the Eastern Grass Court Championships at Rye, N.Y. defeating Bill Tilden, Berkeley Bell, and Gregory Mangin in the last three rounds. He won the same tournament in 1932 defeating Mangin again the final in four sets.

In 1931, Sutter won the Mason Dixon Championships at The Greenbrier resort, defeating George Lott in a close five set final.

In 1933 Sutter won the Pinehurst Resort tennis championship defeating Lott in the final in three straight sets.

Sutter was ranked world no. 5 for 1932 by A. Wallis Myers of The Daily Telegraph.

His brother Ernie was also a tennis player. Ernie won the NCAA singles for Tulane twice, 1936 and 1937, reached the quarterfinals in singles in Cincinnati in 1934, and beat Bobby Riggs on clay in the River Oaks tournament in Houston, shortly before Riggs won Wimbledon in 1939.

In 1991, Sutter was inducted into the USTA Eastern Tennis Hall of Fame.
