= Keith Gledhill =

American tennis player

- Country (sports): United States
- Born: February 16, 1911 Santa Barbara, California
- Died: June 2, 1999 (aged 88)
- Turned pro: 1934 (amateur tour from 1930)
- Retired: 1942
- Plays: Right-handed (1-handed backhand)
- College: Stanford University

Singles

Grand Slam singles results
- Australian Open: F (1933)
- Wimbledon: 3R (1933)
- US Open: 4R (1931, 1932, 1933)
- Professional majors
- US Pro: SF (1941)
- French Pro: QF (1934)

Doubles

Grand Slam doubles results
- Australian Open: W (1933)
- Wimbledon: 1R (1933)
- US Open: W (1932)

Keith Gledhill (February 16, 1911 – June 2, 1999) was an American tennis player of the 1930s.

== Playing career ==
In 1929 Gledhill won the national junior singles and, partnering Ellsworth Vines, doubles title. He attended Stanford University and in 1931, became the second Stanford player to win the NCAA Men's Singles Championship. In 1932, Gledhill and partner Joe Coughlin won the NCAA Doubles Championship.

In Grand Slam events, Gledhill and partner Ellsworth Vines won the doubles championship at the U.S. Championships in 1932. Six months later, Gledhill and Vines won the 1933 Australian Championships doubles title. In that tournament, Gledhill also recorded his best Grand Slam singles result. In the quarter finals, Gledhill was 2 sets to 0 and 5–3 down against the finalist of the previous three years, Harry Hopman, but fought back to win. Gledhill then beat Vivian McGrath before losing in the final to Jack Crawford.

In 1930 and 1933 Gledhill reached the final in the singles event of the Pacific Coast Championships on Los Angeles, but lost both finals to George Lott and Lester Stoefen respectively.

Gledhill turned professional in early 1934 and joined a tour with Bill Tilden and Vines.

== Grand Slam finals ==
=== Singles (1 runner-up) ===
Result	Year	Championship	Surface	Opponent	Score
Loss	1933	Australian Championships	Grass	(Australia) Jack Crawford	6–2, 5–7, 3–6, 2–6

=== Doubles (2 titles) ===
Result	Year	Championship	Surface	Partner	Opponents	Score
Win	1932	U.S. Championships	Grass	(United States) Ellsworth Vines	(United States) Wilmer Allison (United States) John Van Ryn	10–8, 6–4, 4–6, 7–5
Win	1933	Australian Championships	Grass	(United States) Ellsworth Vines	(Australia) Jack Crawford (Australia) Edgar Moon	6–4, 6–3, 6–2
