= Frank Bowden (tennis) =

American tennis player (1908–1977)

- Full name: Frank Joseph Bowden
- Country (sports): United States
- Born: June 22, 1908 New York City, United States
- Died: February 28, 1977 (aged 68) Morristown, New Jersey, United States
- Turned pro: 1928 (amateur tour)
- Retired: 1953

Grand Slam singles results
- US Open: QF (1931)
- Military career
- Allegiance: United States
- Branch: United States Army
- Service years: 1942–1946, Papua New Guinea, Philippines

Frank Joseph Bowden (/ˈbaʊdən/; June 22, 1908 – February 28, 1977) was an American tennis player who was a quarter finalist in the singles at the 1931 U.S. National Championships. He was active from 1928 to 1953.

== Career ==
Bowden played his first tournament in 1928 at the British Columbia Championships. In 1930 he won his first singles title at the Yonkers City Championships. Bowden made his debut in the U. S. championships in 1930 and lost in round two. At the 1931 U.S. Championships, Bowden caused the "biggest upset of the year" by beating Wimbledon champion Sidney Wood in the third round. According to Bill Tilden "Sidney allowed himself to be drawn in. He had to come in because Bowden was shortening up. And once Sidney came up, he left himself wide open for that shot down the sideline or a smart rap across court". Wood admitted afterwards "I was afraid to go to the net". Bowden lost in the quarterfinals to Fred Perry. Bowden continued to play in the U. S. championships until 1947, reaching the last 16 in 1935 and 1940. Bowden was three times a finalist in the national indoor championships (losing the 1937 final to Frank Parker, the 1938 final to Don McNeill and the 1939 final to Wayne Sabin). Bowden won his final singles title in 1940 at the Englewood Invitation tournament held at the Field Club, Englewood, New Jersey. He played his final tournament at the U.S. International Indoor Championships in 1953.

After serving as a 2nd lieutenant in the US Army in WW2, in Papua New Guinea, and Philippines, he worked as a statistician for the New York Telephone Company.

== Style of play ==
Allison Danzig of The New York Times described Bowden's playing style "His service was a veritable lightning bolt and if the ball came back, he was up to the net to smother the return with his volleys and kills. His hard forehand and sweeping backhand kept the ball deep to crowd his opponent in the corners and pave the way for successful forages at close quarters".
