= Ellsworth Vines =

American tennis player and golfer (1911–1994)

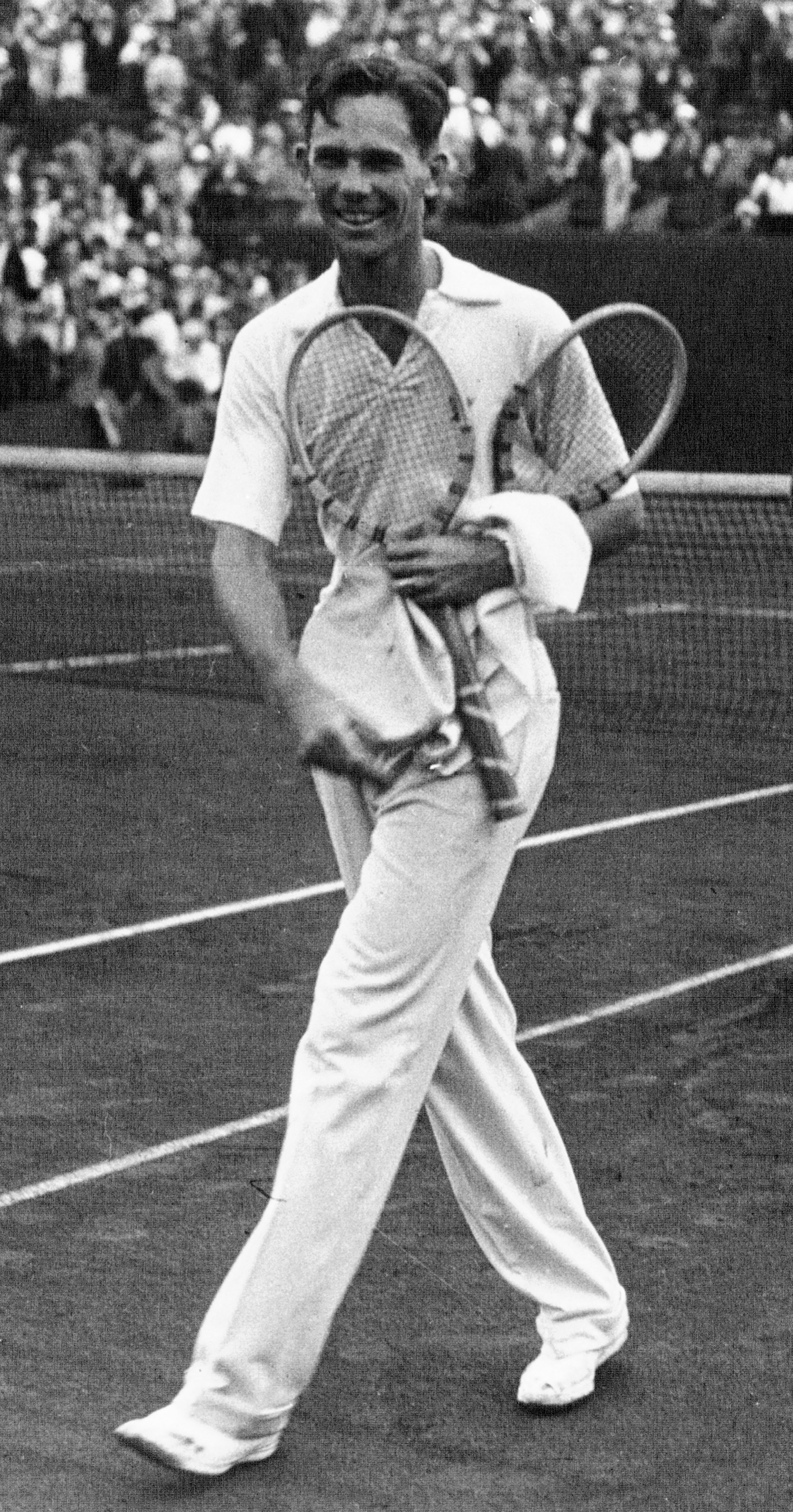
- Full name: Henry Ellsworth Vines Jr.
- Country (sports): United States
- Born: September 28, 1911 Los Angeles, California, US
- Died: March 17, 1994 (aged 82) La Quinta, California, US
- Height: 6 ft 2.5 in (1.89 m)
- Turned pro: 1934
- Retired: 1940
- Plays: Right-handed (one-handed backhand)
- Int. Tennis HoF: 1962 (member page)

Singles
- Career record: 621-227 (73.2%)
- Career titles: 36
- Highest ranking: No. 1 (1932, A. Wallis Myers)

Grand Slam singles results
- Australian Open: QF (1933)
- Wimbledon: W (1932)
- US Open: W (1931, 1932)

Other tournaments
- Professional majors
- US Pro: W (1939)
- Wembley Pro: W (1934, 1935)
- French Pro: W (1935)

Grand Slam doubles results
- Australian Open: W (1933)
- US Open: W (1932)

Grand Slam mixed doubles results
- US Open: W (1933)

Ellsworth Vines
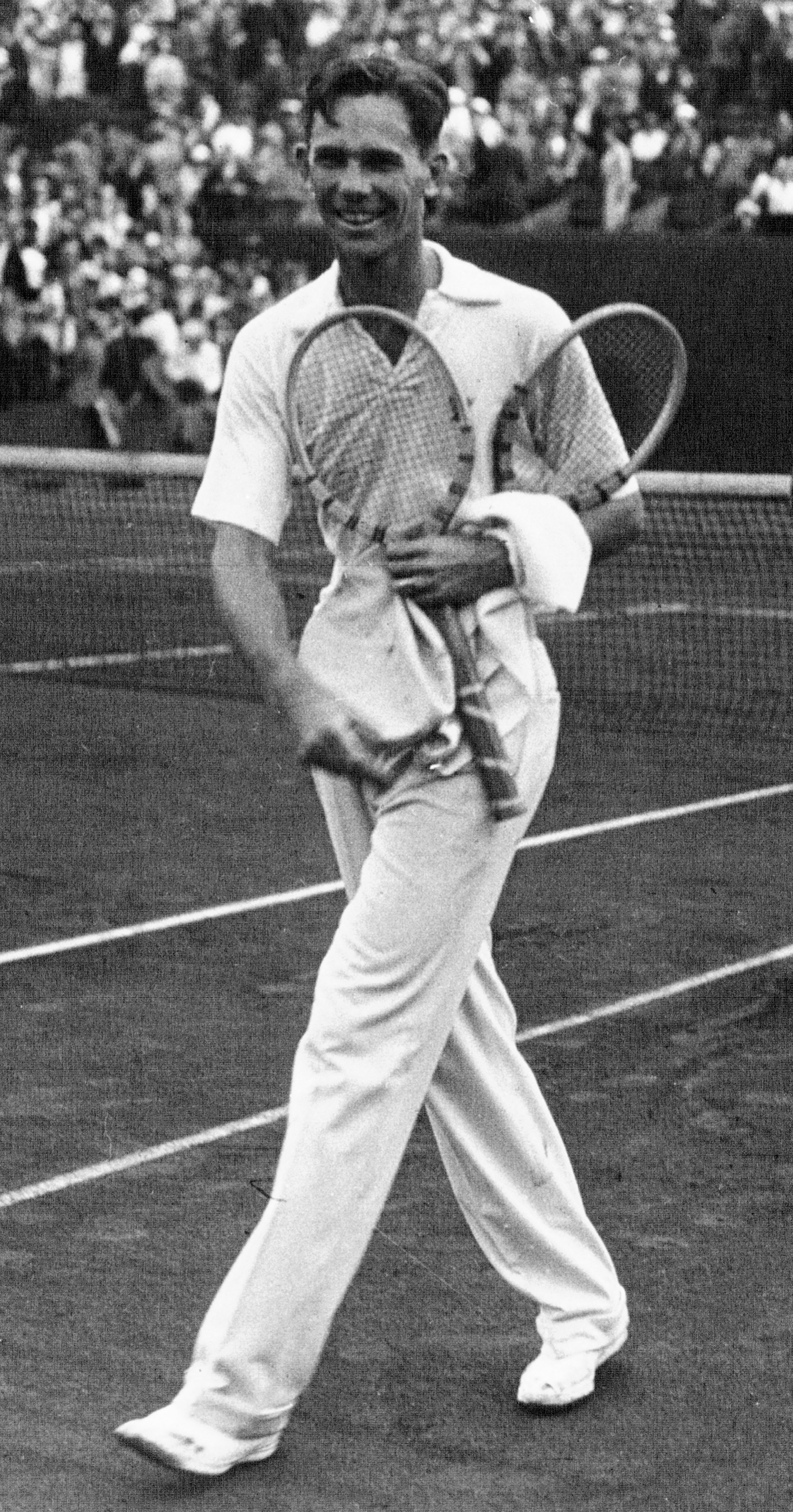

Personal information
- Nationality: United States
- Weight: 155 lb (70 kg; 11.1 st)

Career
- Sport: Golf
- College: University of Southern California
- Turned professional: 1942
- Former tour: PGA Tour
- Professional wins: 3

Best results in major championships
- Masters Tournament: T24: 1947
- PGA Championship: T3: 1951
- U.S. Open: T14: 1948, 1949
- The Open Championship: DNP

Henry Ellsworth Vines Jr. (September 28, 1911 – March 17, 1994) was an American tennis champion of the 1930s, the World No. 1 player or the co-No. 1 in 1932 as an amateur, and in 1934, 1935, 1936 and 1937 as a professional. He won three Grand Slam titles, the U.S. National Championships in 1931 and 1932 and the Wimbledon Championships in 1932. Vines also was able to win Pro Slam titles on three different surfaces. He later became a professional golfer and reached the semifinals of the PGA Championship in 1951.

== Tennis career ==
=== Amateur ===
Vines attended the University of Southern California in Los Angeles, California, where he was a member of the Sigma Nu fraternity and played on the freshman basketball team. Many believe that Mercer Beasley started him on his tennis career at age 14 in Pasadena. He was mentored by Perry T. Jones through the Los Angeles Tennis Club and the Southern California Tennis Association.

1927

Vines, aged 15, reached the quarter-finals of the Pacific Northwest Championships in Tacoma in July, where he lost to Dick Stevens. In September Vines lost in the last 16 of the California state championships to Bowie Dietrick. "Vines had the first set, 5–3, on his own service, but was unable to sustain the pace against his able and more experienced opponent, and lost the first set, 8–10. He seemed pretty well tried out by that time, and Dietrick put the second set away at 6–2".

1928

Vines reached the quarter-finals of the Pacific Southwest tournament in October, where he lost to Christian Boussus. "Vines forced Boussus to the limit in their match. The young Pasadenan's service was far better than that of Boussus, but the Frenchman's marvelous placements and his steadiness brought him through victoriously. He usually was content to hit the ball back, without trying fancy shots, and forced Vines into errors in long rallies."

1929

In July, Vines lost in the final of the Western Championships in Chicago to Keith Gledhill. At the Wisconsin Championships in Milwaukee in August, Vines lost to Gledhill in the final.

1930

In February, Vines beat Lester Stoefen in the final of the Los Angeles championships. In May, Vines won the Southern California championships beating Gledhill in the final. In June, Vines won the Pasadena championships, beating Stoefen in the final. In July, Vines beat Frank Hunter in the final of the New York Metropolitan championships. In September, Vines won the Pacific Southwest championships, beating Wilmer Allison in a long and close five sets in the quarters, Clifford Sutter in four sets in the semifinal and Gregory Mangin in the final.

1931

Vines won his first title of the year in February, beating Stoefen in five sets to win the Los Angeles championships. Vines won the River Oaks tournament in Houston in April beating Bruce Barnes in the final. "Vines's service had so much pace that at times today it almost knocked the racquet from Barnes's hand." Vines won the Ojai valley championships in April over Stoefen. In May, Vines won the Southern Californian championships beating Alan Herrington in the final. "The flashiness of Vines's playing is shown in the fact that he scored forty placement aces to Herrington's three during the four sets. Vines also led in practically every other department of the game." Vines won the California State championships in June beating Ed Chandler in the final. In July, Vines won the U. S. clay court championships in St. Louis beating Gledhill in the final. and the same month won the Longwood Bowl in Brookline, Mass. over John Doeg. Then at the Seabright tournament, Vines came from two sets down to beat Doeg in the final. "The turning point of the match came in the tenth game of the fourth set. At this stage Doeg was leading five to four in games and won the first two points from Vines' service in the tenth. Employing his powerful backhand stroke, the Pasadena youngster pulled the match out of the fire by winning the next four points to take the game." In August, Vines beat Fred Perry in the final of the Newport Casino tournament. Vines was still 19 when he won his first Grand Slam singles title, the U.S. Championships, beating George Lott in the final in four sets. Vines played "erratically throughout the major part of match, but his brilliant placements and cannonball service were sufficient to overcome Lott's steadier volleying and effective service", according to The Daily News (New York). Trailing 5–2 in the fourth set, Vines won five consecutive games to close out the match. In September Vines beat Perry in the final of the Pacific Southwest championships in five sets. "Vines served the almost unbelievable total of twenty-three double faults during the match. When he finally got going, he didn't score many aces, but he was getting his first ball in regularly, and although the Englishman, who battled furiously to the finish, usually managed to get his racket on the ball, he couldn't handle the serve at all. Perry covered the court brilliantly, making many seemingly impossible gets." In October, Vines beat Perry again in the final of the Pacific coast championships. Vines was ranked world No. 2 by Pierre Gillou and by Didier Poulain.

1932

In April, Vines beat Allison in the final of the Mason-Dixon tournament at The Greenbrier resort in White Sulphur Springs. At Wimbledon Championships, Vines beat Bunny Austin easily in the final and the winning ace was hit so hard, Austin claimed he couldn't see it. Vines beat Allison in the final of the Newport Casino event in August. At the U.S. Championships, Vines beat Cliff Sutter in the semi-finals in five long sets when he came very close to defeat. He then beat Henri Cochet in the final to retain his title. In November Vines beat Allison in five sets in the final of the New South Wales championships. Vines was ranked World No. 1 amateur by A. Wallis Myers, Bernard Brown, Pierre Gillou, F. Gordon Lowe and Jean Borotra.

1933

1933 was a poor year for Vines. One of his surprising losses was to young Australian player Vivian McGrath in the Australian championships quarter finals. Vines won the Ojai Valley championships in April beating Gledhill in the final. Vines reached the final of Wimbledon, but lost a classic five set battle to Jack Crawford. It was a "Wimbledon final that produced some of the greatest tennis in the history of the world famous tournament" and "the crowd gave Crawford one of the longest, wildest cheers that ever has echoed through Wimbledon". At the US Championships, Vines lost in the fourth round to Bryan Grant.

=== Professional ===
1934

Vines played his first professional tennis match on January 10, 1934, and then became the leading pro player until 1938 (and the World No. 1 or No. 2 in the combined amateur-professional rankings). In his first World Professional Championship tour, Vines overcame the 41 year old Bill Tilden. From May to June, Vines participated in the US tournament circuit. Vines won tournaments at New York, Philadelphia, Boston and Cleveland, beating Tilden in each of these events. Then Vines lost in the semi-finals at Detroit to Karel Kozeluh and didn't play in the remaining events of the tour at Milwaukee and St. Louis. At the US Pro in Chicago, Vines lost surprisingly in the semi-finals to Hans Nusslein. At Wembley, Vines won the title in a round robin that also featured Nusslein, Tilden, Martin Plaa, Bruce Barnes and Dan Maskell. Then Vines won in the Parc de expositions tournament in Paris beating Nusslein in the final. In December, Vines beat Tilden in the final of the Roubaix tournament. Vines was ranked World No. 1 pro by Ray Bowers and was ranked No. 1 in combined pro/amateur lists by Pierre Gillou and Tennis (Italian newspaper).

1935

Vines beat Lester Stoefen in the World series (after a disastrous start to the tour, Stoefen withdrew from the tour). At the French Pro at Roland Garros, Vines beat Nusslein in the final. Vines then won the tournament at Southport beating Tilden. Vines then won tournaments at Deauville and La Baule (also over Tilden). However, he surprisingly lost to Robert Ramillon at a tournament at Le Touquet. At Wembley, Vines trailed Stoefen 4–1 in the fifth set in the semi-finals but won in five sets and beat Tilden in five sets in the final. Vines was ranked World No. 1 pro by Bowers and no. 1 in a combined amateur/pro list by Henri Cochet.

1936

Over the next three years, Vines concentrated on playing tours and did not enter tournaments. He beat Stoefen to win the 1936 World series. In November, he toured Asia with Tilden and won the tour easily. Vines was ranked World No. 1 pro by Bowers and Fred Perry. Vines was also ranked combined pro/amateur World No. 1 by Bill Tilden and Robert Murray(Sports Illustrated).

1937

1937 featured the first of the Vines-Perry World Series tours. 1937 was a very successful tour, grossing $412,000. The result was still in doubt until the penultimate match, when Vines beat Perry at Hershey. Vines then won the final match of the series at Scranton to win the series 32–29. Touring UK and Ireland, Perry won a short series against Vines, including winning two of the three matches at Wembley, where they played for the King George VI Coronation Cup. Perry and Vines were ranked joint no. 1 pros by Bowers.

1938

The 1938 World Series was another tough battle. After coming back from four match points down to win at Richmond on 8 May, Vines said "I've got a good lead over that guy (Perry) and I'm going to keep it just to prove once and for all who's No 1 man" and "if Budge turns pro next year I want to be the one to play against him because that's where the money will be. After this tour ends there'll be no doubt who's the better man between me and Perry". Vines won the series 49–35. In November, Vines and Perry toured South and Central America and won four matches each. Vines was ranked World No. 1 pro by Bowers.

1939

In 1939 Vines lost his world pro crown to Don Budge but narrowly: in the World Professional Championship tour against each other, Vines trailed Budge 17–22. The tour proved that at his best Vines was unbeatable, although Vines laboured with a shoulder problem and a pulled stomach muscle in the series, losing five straight matches while injured. Vines commented, "I thought I could beat Budge, and I think I would have," Vines said. "I had to serve side-armed and he was just knocking the ball down my throat."

Budge's consistency prevailed a majority of the time. Touring Europe with Tilden and Stoefen in the summer, Budge won the tour and beat Vines more comfortably than he had done in the World Series.

In June, Vines won the Brussels Professional Spring Championships, defeating Budge and Tilden in close matches. Vines lost in the final at Roland Garros to Budge. In the Edinburgh professional tournament, Vines won the event with wins over Budge and Tilden. At the knock-out event at Southport, Vines lost in the semi-finals to Nusslein, who then defeated Tilden in the final.

His final title came at the U.S. Pro Tennis Championships in October at the Beverly Hills Tennis Club on cement, where he beat Perry in the final in a close and brilliantly played four sets (Budge declined to participate in the US Pro).

In 1939, Vines was ranked world No. 2 professional by Alfred Chave and combined amateur/pro world No. 2 by Didier Poulain.

1940

In April 1940 Vines, at 28 years old, played his last tennis competition at the West Coast professional tennis tournament in Los Angeles. His physical problems, his desire to enjoy family life, his loss of the world crown, and above all his increasing passion for golf drove him to retire from tennis.

Vines' career earnings as of May 1938 were reported to be $185,000.

== Abilities ==
Comparing Vines and Fred Perry after the 1939 tours, Don Budge wrote,

It was simply that after enduring Vines's power game, I never felt any real pressure against Perry.

In 1975, Budge ranked his top five players of all-time and rated Vines number one. He also said Vines had the best serve. Budge stated that "[Vines] was the best hitter of a tennis ball I've ever seen. He hit the ball harder and better and closer to the line than anybody. When he was on, no one could beat him."

In 1983, Fred Perry ranked the greatest male players of all time and put them in to two categories, before World War 2 and after. Perry's pre-WWII nominees all below Tilden and excluding himself "Budge, Cochet, Ellsworth Vines 'so powerful!', Gottfried von Cramm, Jack Crawford, Jari Sato, Jean Borotra, Bunny Austin, Roderick Menzel, Baron Umberto de Morpurgo".

In the opinion of Jack Kramer, Vines was, along with Don Budge, one of the two greatest players who ever lived. Budge was consistently the best, according to Kramer's 1979 autobiography, but at the very top of his game, Vines was unbeatable by anyone:

...On his best days, Vines played the best tennis ever. Hell, when Elly was on, you'd be lucky to get your racket on the ball once you served it. (Note: In his 1979 autobiography Kramer considered the best player ever to have been either Don Budge (for consistent play) or Ellsworth Vines (at the height of his game). The next four best were, chronologically, Bill Tilden, Fred Perry, Bobby Riggs, and Pancho Gonzales. After these six came the "second echelon" of Rod Laver, Lew Hoad, Ken Rosewall, Gottfried von Cramm, Ted Schroeder, Jack Crawford, Pancho Segura, Frank Sedgman, Tony Trabert, John Newcombe, Arthur Ashe, Stan Smith, Björn Borg, and Jimmy Connors. He felt unable to rank Henri Cochet and René Lacoste accurately but felt they were among the very best.)

In 1990, Kramer opined that "Nobody ever served better." Kramer's summation of Vines' stature in the game was "He was the best."

Perry, who never beat Vines as an amateur, said Vines' serve was one of the greatest weapons in the history of tennis. "He had the greatest serve I have ever seen anywhere by anybody," Perry said. "In one of our pro exhibitions, in 1937, I believe, he had one clocked 118 m.p.h. from hitting to the landing. Nowadays, they use the radar gun to tell you the speed when it leaves the racket."

In 1935, another measuring device was used in Philadelphia to measure Vines' service speed, recording speeds averaging 130 mph for ten serves.

Tall and thin, Vines possessed a game with no noticeable weaknesses except, according to Kramer, because of his great natural athletic ability, laziness. He was particularly known for his powerful forehand and his very fast serve, both of which he generally hit absolutely flat with no spin. Although he could play the serve-and-volley game, he generally played an all-court game, preferring to hit winners from the baseline. Playing in the white flannel trousers that were standard dress for the time, he greatly impressed the youthful Kramer in a 1935 match in Southern California:

And here is Ellsworth Vines, 6'2½" tall, 155 pounds, dressed like Fred Astaire and hitting shots like Babe Ruth.

Kramer made up his mind on the spot to concentrate on tennis. Vines had, according to Kramer,

the perfect slim body, that was coordinated for anything. Elly won Forest Hills the first time when he was still only nineteen, but at the same time he was also devoting himself to basketball at the University of Southern California. He went there, on a basketball scholarship.

(NOTE: The school's official all-time roster does not list him; however, this does not mean that Vines did not earn a basketball scholarship.)

In his chapter on 1932, Bud Collins writes in Total Tennis: The Ultimate Tennis Encyclopedia that Vines:

had a curious windmill stroke in which the racket made an almost 360-degree sweep. Starting on high as though he were going to serve, he brought the racket back almost to the ground and swept up to the ball. He put no spin on it, however, thereby hitting a flat shot with tremendous force that made him unbeatable when he was on.

Collins goes on to say that:

Opponents came to realize that the way to beat him was to keep the ball in play, hitting him soft stuff until he started making errors.

Kramer compared Vines to Lew Hoad, another great tennis player:

Both were very strong guys. Both succeeded at a very young age...Also, both were very lazy guys. Vines lost interest in tennis (for golf) before he was thirty, and Hoad never appeared to be very interested. Despite their great natural ability, neither put up the outstanding records that they were capable of. Unfortunately, the latter was largely true because both had physical problems.

Vines was inducted into the International Tennis Hall of Fame in Newport, Rhode Island in 1962.

In 100 Greatest of All Time, a 2012 television series broadcast by the Tennis Channel, Vines was ranked the 37th greatest male player, just behind Australian Lleyton Hewitt at 36th, and just ahead of Pancho Segura at 38th. Vines' contemporary rivals were also included in the list, Perry (a player whom Vines had beaten in two pro championship tours) was ranked at 15th, Cochet was ranked at 27th, and Crawford was ranked at 32nd.

== Career statistics ==
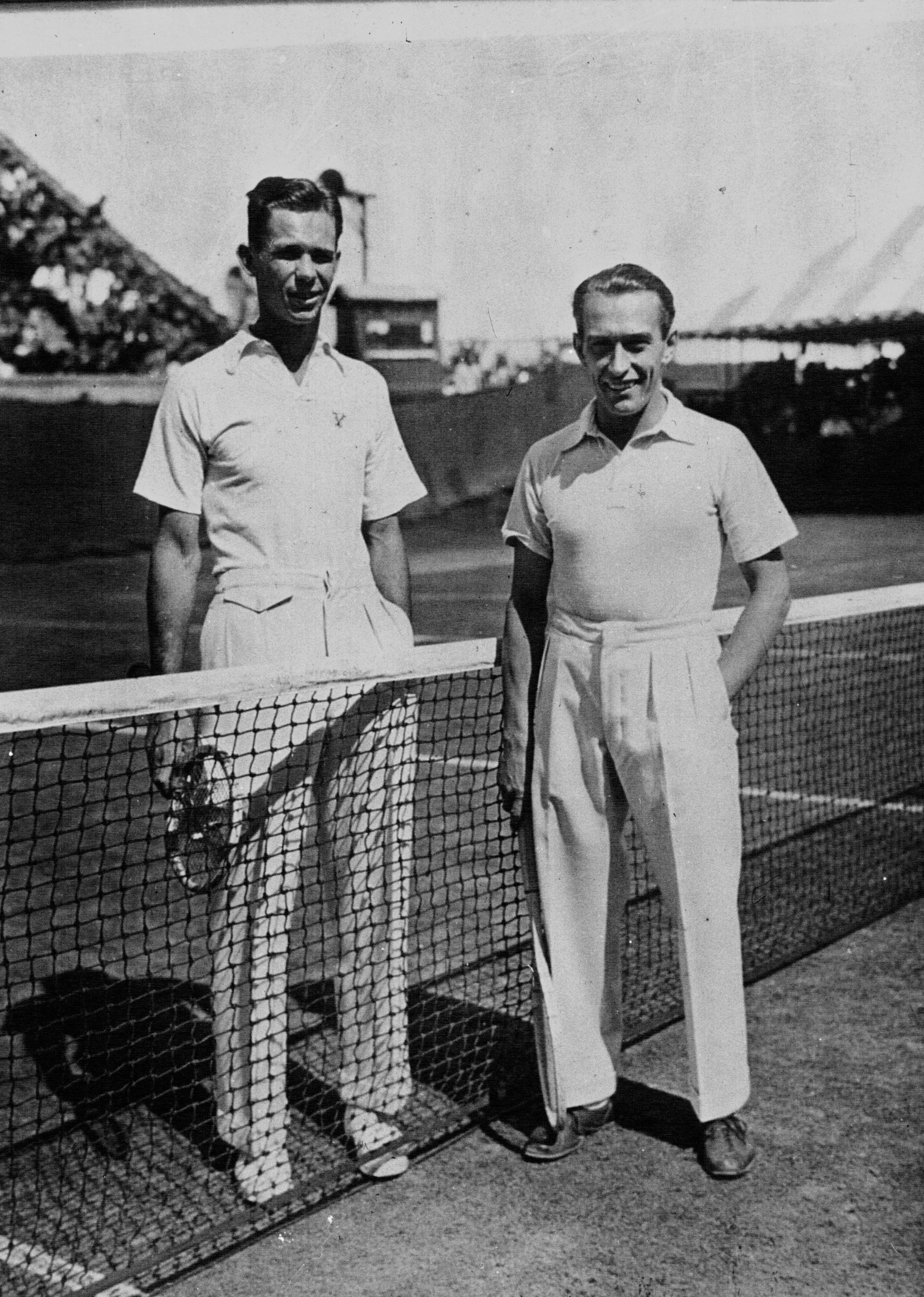
Vines (l) and Henri Cochet in 1932

=== Major finals ===
==== Grand Slam tournaments ====
===== Singles (3 titles, 1 runner-up) =====
Result	Year	Championship	Surface	Opponent	Score
Win	1931	U.S. Championships	Grass	(United States) George Lott	7–9, 6–3, 9–7, 7–5
Win	1932	Wimbledon	Grass	(United Kingdom) Bunny Austin	6–4, 6–2, 6–0
Win	1932	U.S. Championships (2)	Grass	(France) Henri Cochet	6–4, 6–4, 6–4
Loss	1933	Wimbledon	Grass	(Australia) Jack Crawford	6–4, 9–11, 2–6, 6–2, 4–6

==== Doubles (2 titles) ====
Result	Year	Championship	Surface	Partner	Opponents	Score
Win	1932	U.S. Championships	Grass	(United States) Keith Gledhill	(United States) Wilmer Allison (United States) John Van Ryn	10–8, 6–4, 4–6, 7–5
Win	1933	Australian Championships	Grass	(United States) Keith Gledhill	(Australia) Jack Crawford (Australia) Edgar Moon	6–4, 6–3, 6–2

==== Pro Slam tournaments ====
===== Singles (4 titles, 1 runner-up) =====
Result	Year	Championship	Surface	Opponent	Score
Win	1934	Wembley Pro	Indoor	(Germany) Hans Nüsslein	4–6, 7–5, 6–3, 8–6
Win	1935	French Pro	Clay	(Germany) Hans Nüsslein	10–8, 6–4, 3–6, 6–1
Win	1935	Wembley Pro	Indoor	(United States) Bill Tilden	6–1, 6–3, 5–7, 3–6, 6–3
Loss	1939	French Pro	Clay	(United States) Don Budge	2–6, 5–7, 3–6
Win	1939	U.S. Pro	Hard	(United Kingdom) Fred Perry	8–6, 6–8, 6–1, 20–18

=== Singles performance timeline ===
Vines was banned from competing in the amateur Grand Slams when he joined the professional tennis circuit in 1934.

Key
W	F	SF	QF	#R	RR	Q#	DNQ	A	NH

(W) winner; (F) finalist; (SF) semifinalist; (QF) quarterfinalist; (#R) rounds 4, 3, 2, 1; (RR) round-robin stage; (Q#) qualification round; (DNQ) did not qualify; (A) absent; (NH) not held; (SR) strike rate (events won / competed); (W–L) win–loss record.

	1930	1931	1932	1933	1934	1935	1936	1937	1938	1939	SR	W–L	Win %
Grand Slam tournaments											3 / 7	31–4	88.6
Australian Open	A	A	A	QF	A	A	A	A	A	A	0 / 1	2–1	66.7
French Open	A	A	A	A	A	A	A	A	A	A	0 / 0	–	–
Wimbledon	A	A	W	F	A	A	A	A	A	A	1 / 2	13–1	92.9
US Open	3R	W	W	4R	A	A	A	A	A	A	2 / 4	16–2	88.9
Pro Slam tournaments											4 / 7	20–4	83.3
U.S. Pro	A	A	A	A	SF	A	A	A	A	W	1 / 2	5–1	83.3
French Pro	A	A	A	NH	A	W	A	A	A	F	1 / 2	6–1	85.7
Wembley Pro	Not held				W	W	NH	A	NH	4th	2 / 3	9–2	81.8
Win–loss	2–1	6–0	13–0	10–3	7–1	7–0				6–3	7 / 14	51–8	86.4

== Golf career ==
In 1939, Vines, by now, was losing interest in tennis and was turning his attention more and more to golf. By the following year, his increasing passion for golf drove him to retire from tennis.

In 1942, he turned pro. He won at least three significant events (1946 Massachusetts Open, 1951 Southern California PGA Championship, and 1955 Utah Open). He also reached the semifinals of the 1951 PGA Championship, a major championship, when it was played as a match play format. Writes Kramer:

He was twice in the top 10 of golf money winnings, and he was surely the best athlete ever in the two sports.

=== Professional wins (3) ===
- 1946 Massachusetts Open
- 1951 Southern California PGA Championship
- 1955 Utah Open

=== Results in major championships ===
Tournament	1939	1940	1941	1942
U.S. Amateur			R64	NT
The Amateur Championship	R64	NT	NT	NT

Tournament	1943	1944	1945	1946	1947	1948	1949	1950	1951	1952	1953	1954	1955	1956	1957
Masters Tournament	NT	NT	NT		T24	T28	38								
U.S. Open	NT	NT	NT	T26	T51	T14	T14								
PGA Championship	NT			R64				R32	SF		R64	R64		R64	R32

Note: Vines did not play in The Open Championship.

Top 10
Did not play

NT = no tournament
"T" indicates a tie for a place
R64, R32, R16, QF, SF = round in which player lost in match play

Source for The Masters: www.masters.com

Source for U.S. Open and U.S. Amateur: USGA Championship Database

Source for PGA Championship: PGA Championship Media Guide

Source for 1939 Amateur Championship: The Glasgow Herald, May 26, 1939, pg. 21.

== See also ==
- Frank Conner and G. H. "Pete" Bostwick Jr. are the only other men to have competed in the U.S. Open in both tennis and golf
- List of male tennis players

== Sources ==
- The Game, My 40 Years in Tennis (1979), Jack Kramer with Frank Deford (ISBN 0-399-12336-9)
- Total Tennis: The Ultimate Tennis Encyclopedia (2003), by Bud Collins (ISBN 0-9731443-4-3)
- How to Play Tennis (1933), by Mercer Beasley
- Tennis, Myth and Method (1978), by Ellesworth Vines
- Los Angeles Tennis Club
