= Berkeley Bell =

American tennis player (1907–1967)

- Full name: Richard Berkeley Bell
- Country (sports): United States
- Born: November 8, 1907 Austin, Texas, U.S.
- Died: June 15, 1967 (aged 59)
- Plays: Right-handed

Singles
- Career record: 116-76
- Career titles: 24

Grand Slam singles results
- Wimbledon: 3R (1930)
- US Open: QF (1931)
- Professional majors
- US Pro: SF (1938)

Doubles

Grand Slam doubles results
- US Open: F (1929, 1931)

Richard Berkeley Bell (November 8, 1907 – June 15, 1967) was an American male tennis player who ranked No. 7 among the U.S. amateurs in 1934.

He twice reached the final of the men's doubles competition at the U.S. National Championships (now US Open). In 1929 he partnered with Lewis White and lost the final in four sets against George Lott and John Doeg. Two years later, in 1931, he teamed up with Gregory Mangin and lost to John Van Ryn and Wilmer Allison in three straight sets. His best singles performance came in 1931 when he reached the quarterfinals at the U.S. National Championships but lost in three straight sets to Fred Perry.

In 1929, Bell won the New York State Championships defeating Frank Shields in the final in four sets.

Bell won the Seabright Invitational in 1934 defeating Wilmer Allison in the semifinal in four sets and Bitsy Grant in the final in five sets.

He won the Eastern Clay Court Championships in 1935.

Together with Gregory Mangin he won the doubles title at the National Indoors Tennis Championships, played at the Seventh Regiment Armory in New York. He turned pro in December 1935.

Berkeley Bell died aged 59 of a heart attack after taking part in a tennis tournament for veteran players.

== Grand Slam finals ==
=== Doubles (2 runner-ups) ===
Result	Year	Championship	Surface	Partner	Opponents	Score
Loss	1929	U.S. National Championships	Grass	(United States) Lewis White	(United States) George Lott (United States) John Doeg	8–10, 6–1, 4–6, 1–6
Loss	1931	U.S. National Championships	Grass	(United States) Gregory Mangin	(United States) John Van Ryn (United States) Wilmer Allison	4–6, 3–6, 2–6
