= Gregory Mangin =

American tennis player (1907–1979)

- Full name: Gregory Sylvester Mangin
- Country (sports): United States
- Born: November 1, 1907 Newark, New Jersey
- Died: October 27, 1979 (aged 71) Newark, New Jersey
- Plays: Right-handed (one-handed backhand)

Singles
- Career record: 114-68
- Career titles: 18
- Highest ranking: No. 5 (1933 U.S. ranking)

Grand Slam singles results
- French Open: QF (1933)
- Wimbledon: QF (1930)
- US Open: QF (1928, 1930, 1933, 1935, 1936)

Doubles

Grand Slam doubles results
- Wimbledon: QF (1931, 1932)
- US Open: F (1931)

Mixed doubles

Grand Slam mixed doubles results
- Wimbledon: 4R (1930, 1932)

Gregory Sylvester Mangin (November 1, 1907 – October 27, 1979) was an American tennis player and Wall Street broker. He won four U.S. Indoor singles titles in the 1930s.

== Early life and education ==
Mangin was born in Newark, New Jersey. All four of his grandparents were born in Ireland.

He was educated at Georgetown University and learned lawn tennis in Montclair, New Jersey.

== Tennis career ==
Mangin won the Eastern Clay Court Championships in 1928 defeating Herbert Bowman in the final.

Mangin won the singles title at the U.S. Indoor Championships, held at the Seventh Regiment Armory in New York, in 1932, 1933, 1935 and 1936.

In 1931, Mangin and Berkeley Bell were runners-up in the doubles final of the U.S. National Championships in Brookline, Mass., losing in straight sets to compatriots John Van Ryn and Wilmer Allison.

He was a member of the US Davis Cup teams in 1930 and 1931 but did not play any matches.

== Military service ==
During WWII Mangin enlisted in the United States Army Air Forces (AAF). He became a tail gunner on the B-17 Flying Fortress and flew 50 missions over Europe. He was wounded twice in missions over Italy and France, and shot down two Bf 109s in a mission over Germany. Reaching the rank of staff sergeant, he received the Distinguished Flying Cross (DFC), the Air Medal with six clusters, and a Purple Heart with one cluster.

== Grand Slam finals ==
=== Doubles (1 runner-up) ===
Result	Year	Championship	Surface	Partner	Opponents	Score
Loss	1931	U.S. National Championships	Grass	(United States) Berkeley Bell	(United States) John Van Ryn (United States) Wilmer Allison	4–6, 3–6, 2–6
