= Helen Wills career statistics =

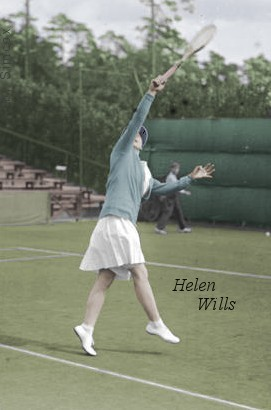
Helen Wills Moody in 1929

This is a list of the main career statistics of American tennis player Helen Wills. During her career, which ran from 1919 through 1938, she won 19 singles titles at Grand Slam tournaments as well as 9 doubles and 3 mixed doubles titles. She won the Olympic gold medal in singles and doubles in 1924. Wills was unbeaten in 180 singles matches.

== Grand Slam tournament finals ==
=== Singles: 22 (19 titles, 3 runner-ups) ===
Result	Year	Championship	Surface	Opponent	Score
Loss	1922	U.S. Championships	Grass	(United States) Molla Bjurstedt Mallory	3–6, 1–6
Win	1923	U.S. Championships	Grass	(United States) Molla Bjurstedt Mallory	6–2, 6–1
Loss	1924	Wimbledon	Grass	(United Kingdom) Kitty McKane	6–4, 4–6, 4–6
Win	1924	U.S. Championships (2)	Grass	(United States) Molla Bjurstedt Mallory	6–1, 6–3
Win	1925	U.S. Championships (3)	Grass	(United Kingdom) Kitty McKane	3–6, 6–0, 6–2
Win	1927	Wimbledon	Grass	(Spain) Lilí de Álvarez	6–2, 6–4
Win	1927	U.S. Championships (4)	Grass	(United Kingdom) Betty Nuthall	6–1, 6–4
Win	1928	French Championships	Clay	(United Kingdom) Eileen Bennett	6–1, 6–2
Win	1928	Wimbledon (2)	Grass	(Spain) Lilí de Álvarez	6–2, 6–3
Win	1928	U.S. Championships (5)	Grass	(United States) Helen Jacobs	6–2, 6–1
Win	1929	French Championships (2)	Clay	(France) Simonne Mathieu	6–3, 6–4
Win	1929	Wimbledon (3)	Grass	(United States) Helen Jacobs	6–1, 6–2
Win	1929	U.S. Championships (6)	Grass	(United Kingdom) Phoebe Holcroft Watson	6–4, 6–2
Win	1930	French Championships (3)	Clay	(United States) Helen Jacobs	6–2, 6–1
Win	1930	Wimbledon (4)	Grass	(United States) Elizabeth Ryan	6–2, 6–2
Win	1931	U.S. Championships (7)	Grass	(United Kingdom) Eileen Bennett Whittingstall	6–4, 6–1
Win	1932	French Championships (4)	Clay	(France) Simonne Mathieu	7–5, 6–1
Win	1932	Wimbledon (5)	Grass	(United States) Helen Jacobs	6–3, 6–1
Win	1933	Wimbledon (6)	Grass	(United Kingdom) Dorothy Round	6–4, 6–8, 6–3
Loss	1933	U.S. Championships	Grass	(United States) Helen Jacobs	6–8, 6–3, 0–3, ret.
Win	1935	Wimbledon (7)	Grass	(United States) Helen Jacobs	6–3, 3–6, 7–5
Win	1938	Wimbledon (8)	Grass	(United States) Helen Jacobs	6–4, 6–0

=== Doubles: 10 finals (9 titles, 1 runner-up) ===
Result	Year	Championship	Surface	Partner	Opponents	Score
Win	1922	U.S. Championships	Grass	(United States) Marion Zinderstein Jessup	(United States) Molla Bjurstedt Mallory (United States) Edith Sigourney	6–4, 7–9, 6–3
Win	1924	Wimbledon	Grass	(United States) Hazel Hotchkiss Wightman	(United Kingdom) Phyllis Howkins Covell (United Kingdom) Kitty McKane	6–4, 6–4
Win	1924	U.S. Championships (2)	Grass	(United States) Hazel Hotchkiss Wightman	(United States) Eleanor Goss (United States) Marion Zinderstein Jessup	6–4, 6–3
Win	1925	U.S. Championships (3)	Grass	(United States) Mary Browne	(United States) May Sutton Bundy (United States) Elizabeth Ryan	6–4, 6–3
Win	1927	Wimbledon (2)	Grass	(United States) Elizabeth Ryan	(South Africa) Bobbie Heine (South Africa) Irene Peacock	6–3, 6–2
Win	1928	U.S. Championships (4)	Grass	(United States) Hazel Hotchkiss Wightman	(United States) Edith Cross (United States) Anna McCune Harper	6–2, 6–2
Win	1930	French Championships	Clay	(United States) Elizabeth Ryan	(France) Simone Barbier (France) Simonne Mathieu	6–3, 6–1
Win	1930	Wimbledon (3)	Grass	(United States) Elizabeth Ryan	(United States) Edith Cross (United States) Sarah Palfrey	6–2, 9–7
Win	1932	French Championships (2)	Clay	(United States) Elizabeth Ryan	(United Kingdom) Eileen Bennett Whittingstall (United Kingdom) Betty Nuthall	6–1, 6–3
Loss	1933	U.S. Championships	Grass	(United States) Elizabeth Ryan	(United Kingdom) Freda James (United Kingdom) Betty Nuthall	default

=== Mixed doubles: 7 finals (3 titles, 4 runner-ups) ===
Result	Year	Championship	Surface	Partner	Opponents	Score
Loss	1922	U.S. Championships	Grass	(United States) Howard Kinsey	(United States) Mary Browne (United States) Bill Tilden	4–6, 3–6
Win	1924	U.S. Championships	Grass	(United States) Vincent Richards	(United States) Molla Bjurstedt Mallory (United States) Bill Tilden	6–8, 7–5, 6–0
Loss	1928	French Championships	Clay	(United States) Frank Hunter	(United Kingdom) Eileen Bennett (France) Henri Cochet	6–3, 3–6, 3–6
Win	1928	U.S. Championships (2)	Grass	(Australia) John Hawkes	(United States) Edith Cross (Australia) Edgar Moon	6–1, 6–3
Loss	1929	French Championships	Clay	(United States) Frank Hunter	(United Kingdom) Eileen Bennett (France) Henri Cochet	3–6, 2–6
Win	1929	Wimbledon	Grass	(United States) Frank Hunter	(United Kingdom) Joan Fry (United Kingdom) Ian Collins	6–1, 6–4
Loss	1932	French Championships	Clay	(United States) Sidney Wood	(United Kingdom) Betty Nuthall (United Kingdom) Fred Perry	4–6, 2–6

== Olympic finals ==
=== Singles: 1 final (1 gold medal) ===
Result	Year	Championship	Surface	Opponent	Score
Gold	1924	Paris Olympics	Grass	(France) Julie Vlasto	6–2, 6–2

=== Doubles: 1 final (1 gold medal) ===
Result	Year	Championship	Surface	Partner	Opponents	Score
Gold	1924	Paris Olympics	Grass	(United States) Hazel Wightman	(United Kingdom) Phyllis Covell (United Kingdom) Kathleen McKane	7–5, 8–6

== Career finals ==
=== Singles: 67 (57 titles, 10 runner-ups) ===
Winner — Legend Grand Slam tournaments (19–3) Summer Olympics (1–0) State Championships (6–2) Other tournaments (31–5)	Titles by surface Hard (12–0) Grass (30–9) Clay (15–1)

Result	Date	Tournament	Location	Surface	Opponent	Score
Win	Sep 1921	California State Championships	Berkeley, CA, US	Hard	(United States) Helen Baker	3–6, 9–7, 6–0
Win	May1922	Pacific Coast Championships	Berkeley, CA, US	Hard	(United States) Rea Leachman	6–1, 6–0
Loss	Jul 1922	Rhode Island State Championships	Providence, RI, US	Grass	(United States) Leslie Bancroft	6–4, 4–6, 3–6
Loss	Jul 1922	Newport Invitational	Newport, RI, US	Grass	(United States) Leslie Bancroft	4–6, 3–6
Loss	Aug 1922	U.S. National Championships	New York, NY, US	Grass	(United States) Molla Mallory	3–6, 1–6
Loss	Sep 1922	Rockaway Hunting Club Invitation	Cedarhurst, NY, US	Grass	(United States) Molla Mallory	6–3, 1–6, 3–6
Win	Jul 1923	Pacific Coast Championships	Berkeley, CA, US	Hard	(United States) Charlotte Hosmer	6–2, 6–0
Win	Jul 1923	Illinois State Championships	Chicago, IL, US	Clay	(United States) Marian Leighton	6–0, 6–0
Loss	Jul 1923	New York State Championships	Rye, NY, US	Grass	(United States) Molla Mallory	6–4, 0–6, 1–6
Win	Aug 1923	U.S. National Championships	New York, NY, US	Grass	(United States) Molla Mallory	6–2, 6–1
Win	Sep 1923	California State Championships	Berkeley, CA, US	Hard	(United States) Charlotte Hosmer	6–3, 6–1
Loss	Jul 1924	Wimbledon	London, UK	Grass	(United Kingdom) Kitty McKane	6–4, 4–6, 4–6
Win	Jul 1924	Summer Olympics	Paris, France	Clay	(France) Diddie Vlasto	6–2, 6–2
Win	Aug 1924	U.S. National Championships	New York, NY, US	Grass	(United States) Molla Mallory	6–1, 6–3
Win	Sep 1924	California State Championships	Berkeley, CA, US	Hard	(United States) May Sutton	6–3, 6–4
Win	May 1925	Central California Championships	Sacramento, CA, US	Hard	(United States) Charlotte Hosmer	6–2, 6–2
Win	Jun 1925	Pacific Coast Championships	Berkeley, CA, US	Hard	(United States) Charlotte Hosmer	6–4, 6–0
Win	Jul 1925	Longwood Invitational	Chestnut Hill, MA, US	Grass	(United States) Marion Jessup	7–5, 6–2
Win	Jul 1925	Essex Country Club Invitational	Manchester, MA, US	Grass	(United States) Mary Browne	6–2, 6–1
Loss	Aug 1925	Seabright Invitational Tournament	Rumson, NJ, US	Grass	(United States) Elizabeth Ryan	3–6, 3–6
Win	Aug 1925	New York State Championships	Rye, NY, US	Grass	(United States) Molla Mallory	3–6, 6–2, 6–2
Win	Aug 1925	U.S. National Championships	New York, NY, US	Grass	(United Kingdom) Kitty McKane	3–6, 6–1, 6–2
Win	Sep 1925	California State Championships	Berkeley, CA, US	Hard	(United States) Lucy McCune	6–0, 6–0
Win	Jan 1926	Metropole Hotel	Cannes, France	Clay	(France) Diddie Vlasto	6–3, 7–5
Win	Jan 1926	Gallia Club	Cannes, France	Clay	(Greece) Hélène Contostavlos	6–3, 6–2
Loss	Feb 1926	Carlton Club	Cannes, France	Clay	(France) Suzanne Lenglen	3–6, 6–8
Win	Feb 1926	Bristol Hotel	Beaulieu, France	Clay	(United Kingdom) Phyllis Satterthwaite	6–1, 6–1
Win	Mar 1926	Monte Carlo Championships	Monte Carlo, Monaco	Clay	(Spain) Lilí de Álvarez	6–2, 6–3
Win	Mar 1926	Riviera Championships	Mentone, France	Clay	(Spain) Lilí de Álvarez	6–4, 6–4
Win	Mar 1926	South of France Championships	Nice, France	Clay	(United States) Isabella Mumford	6–0, 6–1
Win	Mar 1926	Côte d'Azur Championships	Cannes, France	Clay	(United Kingdom) Joan Ridley	default
Win	Aug 1926	Maidstone Women's Invitational	East Hampton, NY, US	Grass	(United States) Mary Browne	6–3, 6–2
Loss	Aug 1926	Seabright Invitational Tournament	Rumson, NJ, US	Grass	(United States) Elizabeth Ryan	4–6, 1–6
Win	Mar 1927	Hotel Huntington Invitation	Pasadena, CA, US	Hard	(United States) Marion Williams	6–2, 6–1
Win	Jun 1927	North London Championships	Stamford Hill, London, UK	Grass	(United States) Elizabeth Ryan	6–2, 6–2
Win	Jun 1927	Kent Championships	Beckenham, Kent, UK	Grass	(United Kingdom) Kitty McKane	6–2, 6–4
Win	Jul 1927	Wimbledon	London, UK	Grass	(Spain) Lilí de Álvarez	6–2, 6–4
Win	Jul 1927	Essex Country Club Invitational	Manchester, MA, US	Grass	(United States) Helen Jacobs	6–1, 6–2
Win	Aug 1927	U.S. National Championships	New York, NY, US	Grass	(United Kingdom) Betty Nuthall	6–1, 6–4
Win	Jun 1928	French Championships	Paris, France	Clay	(United Kingdom) Eileen Bennett	6–1, 6–2
Win	Jul 1928	Wimbledon	London, UK	Grass	(Spain) Lilí de Álvarez	6–2, 6–3
Win	Jul 1928	Essex Country Club Invitational	Manchester, MA, US	Grass	(United States) Edith Cross	6–1, 6–3
Win	Aug 1928	Maidstone Women's Invitational	East Hampton, NY, US	Grass	(United States) Helen Jacobs	6–2, 6–1
Win	Aug 1928	U.S. National Championships	New York, NY, US	Grass	(United States) Helen Jacobs	6–2, 6–1
Win	Jun 1929	French Championships	Paris, France	Clay	(France) Simonne Mathieu	6–3, 6–4
Win	Jul 1929	Wimbledon	London, UK	Grass	(United States) Helen Jacobs	6–1, 6–2
Win	Aug 1929	U.S. National Championships	New York, NY, US	Grass	(United Kingdom) Phoebe Holcroft Watson	6–4, 6–2
Win	Mar 1930	Hotel Huntington Invitational	Pasadena, CA, US	Hard	(United States) Edith Cross	6–1, 6–3
Win	Jun 1930	French Championships	Paris, France	Clay	(United States) Helen Jacobs	6–2, 6–1
Win	Jul 1930	Wimbledon	London, UK	Grass	(United States) Elizabeth Ryan	6–2, 6–2
Win	Oct 1930	Pacific Coast Championships	Berkeley, CA, US	Hard	(United States) Anna McCune Harper	6–3, 6–1
Win	Jul 1931	Essex Country Club Invitation	Manchester, MA, US	Grass	(United States) Anna McCune Harper	6–0, 6–1
Win	Aug 1931	Seabright Invitational Tournament	Rumson, NJ, US	Grass	(United States) Helen Jacobs	6–0, 6–0
Win	Aug 1931	U.S. National Championships	New York, NY, US	Grass	(United Kingdom) Eileen Whittingstall	6–4, 6–1
Win	Jun 1932	French Championships	Paris, France	Clay	(France) Simonne Mathieu	7–5, 6–1
Win	Jul 1932	Wimbledon	London, UK	Grass	(United States) Helen Jacobs	6–3, 6–1
Win	Jul 1932	Dutch Championships	Noordwijk, Netherlands	Clay	(Netherlands) Madzy Rollin Couquerque	6–1, 6–1
Win	Jul 1932	Strasbourg	Strasbourg, Germany	Clay	(Germany) Ilse Friedleben	6–0, 8–6
Win	Jun 1933	London Championships, Queens	London, UK	Grass	(United Kingdom) Elsie Pittman	co-winners, rain
Win	Jul 1933	Wimbledon	London, UK	Grass	(United Kingdom) Dorothy Round	6–4, 6–8, 6–3
Loss	Aug 1933	U.S. National Championships	New York, NY, US	Grass	(United States) Helen Jacobs	6–8, 6–3, 0–3 ret.
Win	Jun 1935	St George's Hill Open	Weybridge, Surrey, UK	Grass	(United Kingdom) Elsie Pittman	6–0, 6–4
Win	Jul 1935	Wimbledon	London, UK	Grass	(United States) Helen Jacobs	6–3, 3–6, 7–5
Win	May 1938	North London Hard Courts Championships	Highbury, UK	Hard	(United States) Yvonne Law	6–2, 7–5
Win	May 1938	Surrey Grass Court Championships	Surbiton, UK	Grass	(United Kingdom) Margot Lumb	6–3, 6–4
Win	Jul 1938	Wimbledon	London, UK	Grass	(United States) Helen Jacobs	6–4, 6–0
Win	Jul 1938	Irish Championships	Dublin, Ireland	Grass	(United Kingdom) Thelma Jarvis	6–4, 6–2

Wright & Ditson's Lawn Tennis Guides
Helen Wills: Tennis, Art, Life

== Team competitions ==
=== Wightman Cup ===
Result	Opponent	Date	Location	Surface	Score	Players	Opponents	W/L	Score
Win	Great Britain	Aug 11–13, 1923	New York, US	Grass	7–0	(United States) Helen Wills	(United Kingdom) Kathleen McKane	W	6–2, 7–5
Win	Great Britain	Aug 11–13, 1923	New York, US	Grass	7–0	(United States) Helen Wills	(United Kingdom) Mabel Clayton	W	6–2, 6–1
Win	Great Britain	Aug 11–13, 1923	New York, US	Grass	7–0	(United States) Molla Mallory (United States) Helen Wills	(United Kingdom) Geraldine Beamish (United Kingdom) Mabel Clayton	W	6–2, 6–2
Loss	Great Britain	Jun 18–19, 1924	London, UK	Grass	1–6	(United States) Helen Wills	(United Kingdom) Phyllis Covell	L	2–6, 4–6
Loss	Great Britain	Jun 18–19, 1924	London, UK	Grass	1–6	(United States) Helen Wills	(United Kingdom) Kathleen McKane	L	2–6, 2–6
Loss	Great Britain	Jun 18–19, 1924	London, UK	Grass	1–6	(United States) Hazel Hotchkiss Wightman (United States) Helen Wills	(United Kingdom) Evelyn Colyer (United Kingdom) Kathleen McKane	W	6–0, 6–3
Loss	Great Britain	Aug 14–15, 1925	New York, US	Grass	3–4	(United States) Helen Wills	(United Kingdom) Joan Fry	W	6–0, 7–5
Loss	Great Britain	Aug 14–15, 1925	New York, US	Grass	3–4	(United States) Helen Wills	(United Kingdom) Kathleen McKane	W	6–1, 1–6, 9–7
Loss	Great Britain	Aug 14–15, 1925	New York, US	Grass	3–4	(United States) Mary Browne (United States) Helen Wills	(United Kingdom) Evelyn Colyer (United Kingdom) Kathleen McKane	L	0–6, 3–6
Win	Great Britain	Aug 12–13, 1927	New York, US	Grass	5–2	(United States) Helen Wills	(United Kingdom) Joan Fry	W	6–2, 6–0
Win	Great Britain	Aug 12–13, 1927	New York, US	Grass	5–2	(United States) Helen Wills	(United Kingdom) Kathleen McKane	W	6–1, 6–1
Win	Great Britain	Aug 12–13, 1927	New York, US	Grass	5–2	(United States) Mary Browne (United States) Helen Wills	(United Kingdom) Evelyn Colyer (United Kingdom) Kathleen McKane	W	6–4, 4–6, 6–3
Loss	Great Britain	Jun 15–16, 1928	London, UK	Grass	3–4	(United States) Helen Wills	(United Kingdom) Phoebe Holcroft Watson	W	6–1, 6–2
Loss	Great Britain	Jun 15–16, 1928	London, UK	Grass	3–4	(United States) Helen Wills	(United Kingdom) Eileen Bennett	W	6–3, 6–2
Loss	Great Britain	Jun 15–16, 1928	London, UK	Grass	3–4	(United States) Penelope Anderson (United States) Helen Wills	(United Kingdom) Eileen Bennett (United Kingdom) Phoebe Holcroft Watson	L	2–6, 1–6
Win	Great Britain	Aug 8–9, 1929	New York, US	Grass	4–3	(United States) Helen Wills	(United Kingdom) Phoebe Holcroft Watson	W	6–1, 6–4
Win	Great Britain	Aug 8–9, 1929	New York, US	Grass	4–3	(United States) Helen Wills	(United Kingdom) Betty Nuthall	W	8–6, 8–6
Win	Great Britain	Aug 8–9, 1929	New York, US	Grass	4–3	(United States) Edith Cross (United States) Helen Wills	(United Kingdom) Phoebe Holcroft Watson (United Kingdom) Peggy Michell	L	4–6, 1–6
Loss	Great Britain	Jun 13–14, 1930	London, UK	Grass	3–4	(United States) Helen Wills Moody	(United Kingdom) Joan Fry	W	6–1, 6–1
Loss	Great Britain	Jun 13–14, 1930	London, UK	Grass	3–4	(United States) Helen Wills Moody	(United Kingdom) Phoebe Holcroft Watson	W	7–5, 6–1
Loss	Great Britain	Jun 13–14, 1930	London, UK	Grass	3–4	(United States) Helen Jacobs (United States) Helen Wills Moody	(United Kingdom) Phoebe Holcroft Watson (United Kingdom) Kathleen McKane Godfree	L	5–7, 6–1, 4–6
Win	Great Britain	Aug 7–8, 1931	New York, US	Grass	5–2	(United States) Helen Wills Moody	(United Kingdom) Phyllis Mudford	W	6–1, 6–4
Win	Great Britain	Aug 7–8, 1931	New York, US	Grass	5–2	(United States) Helen Wills Moody	(United Kingdom) Betty Nuthall	W	6–4, 6–2
Win	Great Britain	Aug 7–8, 1931	New York, US	Grass	5–2	(United States) Anna Harper (United States) Helen Wills Moody	(United Kingdom) Phoebe Holcroft Watson (United Kingdom) Peggy Michell	L	6–8, 7–5, 3–6
Win	Great Britain	Jun 10–11, 1932	London, UK	Grass	4–3	(United States) Helen Wills Moody	(United Kingdom) Eileen Bennett Whittingstall	W	6–2, 6–4
Win	Great Britain	Jun 10–11, 1932	London, UK	Grass	4–3	(United States) Helen Wills Moody	(United Kingdom) Dorothy Round	W	6–2, 6–3
Win	Great Britain	Jun 10–11, 1932	London, UK	Grass	4–3	(United States) Sarah Palfrey (United States) Helen Wills Moody	(United Kingdom) Eileen Bennett Whittingstall (United Kingdom) Betty Nuthall	L	3–6, 6–1, 8–10
Win	Great Britain	Jun 10–11, 1938	London, UK	Grass	5–2	(United States) Helen Wills Moody	(United Kingdom) Margaret Scriven	W	6–0, 7–5
Win	Great Britain	Jun 10–11, 1938	London, UK	Grass	5–2	(United States) Helen Wills Moody	(United Kingdom) Kay Stammers	W	6–2, 3–6, 6–3
Win	Great Britain	Jun 10–11, 1938	London, UK	Grass	5–2	(United States) Dorothy Bundy (United States) Helen Wills Moody	(United Kingdom) Eileen Bennett Whittingstall (United Kingdom) Betty Nuthall	L	2–6, 5–7

- Wightman Cup reference

=== International matches ===
Result	Opponent	Date	Location	Surface	Score	Players	Opponents	W/L	Score
Win	France	May 28–30, 1926	Paris, France	Clay	8–3	(United States) Helen Wills	(France) Simonne Mathieu	W	6–3, 6–4
Loss	Netherlands	May 10–12, 1928	Scheveningen, Netherlands	Grass	2–3	(United States) Helen Wills	(Netherlands) Madzy Rollin Couquerque	W	6–2, 6–2
Loss	Netherlands	May 10–12, 1928	Scheveningen, Netherlands	Grass	2–3	(United States) Helen Wills	(Netherlands) Kea Bouman	W	6–1, 6–2
Loss	Netherlands	May 10–12, 1928	Scheveningen, Netherlands	Grass	2–3	(United States) Penelope Anderson (United States) Helen Wills	(Netherlands) Kea Bouman (Netherlands) Madzy Rollin Couquerque	L	7–9, 6–4, 3–6
Win	Netherlands	May 10–13, 1929	Scheveningen, Netherlands	Grass	7–2	(United States) Helen Wills	(Netherlands) Madzy Rollin Couquerque	W	6–1, 6–1
Win	Netherlands	May 10–13, 1929	Scheveningen, Netherlands	Grass	7–2	(United States) Helen Wills	(Netherlands) Kea Bouman	W	6–1, 6–1
Win	Netherlands	May 10–13, 1929	Scheveningen, Netherlands	Grass	7–2	(United States) Edith Cross (United States) Helen Wills	(Netherlands) Kea Bouman (Netherlands) Madzy Rollin Couquerque	W	6–4, 2–6, 8–6
Win	France	May 17–19, 1929	Paris, France	Clay	4–3	(United States) Helen Wills	(France) Sylvie Lafaurie	W	6–1, 6–2
Win	France	May 17–19, 1929	Paris, France	Clay	4–3	(United States) Helen Wills	(France) Simonne Mathieu	W	8–6, 6–0
Win	France	May 17–19, 1929	Paris, France	Clay	4–3	(United States) Edith Cross (United States) Helen Wills	(France) Sylvie Lafaurie (France) Simonne Mathieu	W	6–2, 2–6, 6–4
Loss	Germany	June 8–10, 1929	Berlin, Germany	Clay	3–4	(United States) Helen Wills	(Germany) Paula von Reznicek	W	6–3, 6–2
Loss	Germany	June 8–10, 1929	Berlin, Germany	Clay	3–4	(United States) Helen Wills	(Germany) Cilly Aussem	W	6–0, 6–1
Loss	Germany	June 8–10, 1929	Berlin, Germany	Clay	3–4	(United States) Edith Cross (United States) Helen Wills	(Germany) Cilly Aussem (Germany) Irmgard Rost	W	6–3, 6–2

== Double bagel match victories ==
During her career Wills defeated opponents 50 times without the loss of a game, i.e. via a double bagel (6–0, 6–0).

No.	Date	Tournament	Location	Surface	Opponent	Round
1.	Aug 1922	Seabright Invitational	Seabright, NJ, US	Grass	(United States) Mrs. E. Crane	1R
2.	Aug 1922	Metropolitan Championships	Glen Cove, NY, US	Grass	(United States) Amy Egbert	2R
3.	Sep 1922	Rockaway Hunting Club	Cedarhurst, NY, US	Grass	(United States) Marion Chapman	2R
4.	Sep 1922	Rockaway Hunting Club	Cedarhurst, NY, US	Grass	(United States) Clare Cassel	SF
5.	Sep 1922	Middle States Championship	Philadelphia, PA, US	Grass	(United States) Genevieve Fox	2R
6.	Jul 1923	Illinois State Championships	Glencoe, IL, US	Clay	(United States) Mrs. Leo Alter	SF
7.	Jul 1923	Illinois State Championships	Glencoe, IL, US	Clay	(United States) Marian Leighton	F
8.	Jul 1923	New York State Championships	Rye, NY, US	Grass	(United States) Mrs Nathaniel Dain	1R
9.	Jul 1923	Seabright Invitational	Seabright, NJ, US	Grass	(United States) Mrs. H.F. Hansell Jr.	2R
10.	Oct 1923	California State Championships	Berkeley, CA, US	Hard	(United States) Mrs. H.N. Cress	2R
11.	Oct 1923	California State Championships	Berkeley, CA, US	Hard	(United States) Sue Maynard	SF
12.	Aug 1924	U.S. Championships	Forest Hills, NY, US	Grass	(Canada) Mrs. L.C. Beaupre	1R
13.	Aug 1924	U.S. Championships	Forest Hills, NY, US	Grass	(United States) Helene Pollak Falk	2R
14.	Jun 1925	Pacific Coast Championships	Berkeley, CA, US	Hard	(United States) Pauline Davies	2R
15.	Aug 1925	New York State Championships	Rye, NY, US	Grass	(United States) Beatrice Koukol	2R
16.	Sep 1925	California State Championships	Berkeley, CA, US	Hard	(United States) Lucy McCune	F
17.	Oct 1925	Australia vs California	Berkeley, CA, US	Hard	(Australia) Sylvia Harper	–
18.	Jan 1926	Metropole Hotel	Cannes, France	Clay	(United Kingdom) E.M. Green	2R
19.	Jan 1926	Gallia Club	Cannes, France	Clay	(United Kingdom) Peggy Saunders	SF
20.	Feb 1926	Carlton Club	Cannes, France	Clay	(France) Emily Fisher	1R
21.	Feb 1926	Carlton Club	Cannes, France	Clay	(United Kingdom) Madeline O'Neill	2R
22.	Feb 1926	Carlton Club	Cannes, France	Clay	(France) Cosette St Omer Roy	3R
23.	Feb 1926	Beaulieu LTC	Beaulieu, France	Clay	(United Kingdom) Lily Hamerton	1R
24.	Feb 1926	Beaulieu LTC	Beaulieu, France	Clay	(United Kingdom) Audrey Wright	2R
25.	Feb 1926	Monte Carlo Championships	Monte Carlo, Monaco	Clay	(France) Mo Marriott	3R
26.	Mar 1926	Riviera Championships	Mentone, France	Clay	(United States) Daisy Hamerton	1R
27.	Mar 1926	South of France Championships	Nice, France	Clay	(United Kingdom) Helen Shirley	2R
28.	Mar 1926	Côte d'Azur Championships	Cannes, France	Clay	(United States) Mrs JR Hall	2R
29.	Mar 1926	Côte d'Azur Championships	Cannes, France	Clay	(United Kingdom) Joan Padwick	QF
30.	Aug 1926	New York State Championships	Rye, NY, US	Grass	(United States) Marguerite Dwyer	2R
31.	Aug 1926	New York State Championships	Rye, NY, US	Grass	(United States) Mr.s R. LeRoy	3R
32.	Jun 1927	Kent Championships	Beckenham, UK	Grass	(South Africa) Billie Tapscott	QF
33.	Jun 1928	Wimbledon	London, UK	Grass	(France) Violette Gallay	3R
34.	Jul 1928	Essex Country Club Invitational	Manchester, MA, USA	Grass	(United States) Louise Iselin	2R
35.	Aug 1928	Maidstone Women's Invitational	East Hampton, NY, US	Grass	(United States) Virginia Rice	2R
36.	Aug 1928	Maidstone Women's Invitational	East Hampton, NY, US	Grass	(United States) Dorothy Andrus	3R
37.	Aug 1928	Maidstone Women's Invitational	East Hampton, NY, US	Grass	(United States) Carolyn Swartz	QF
38.	Jun 1929	Wimbledon	London, UK	Grass	(United Kingdom) G.E. Tomblin	2R
39.	Jun 1929	Wimbledon	London, UK	Grass	(Germany) Toni Schomburgk	3R
40.	Aug 1929	U.S. Championships	New York, NY, US	Grass	(United States) Katherine Lamarche	1R
41.	Aug 1929	U.S. Championships	New York, NY, US	Grass	(United States) Alice Francis	2R
42.	Aug 1929	U.S. Championships	New York, NY, US	Grass	(United States) Molla Mallory	SF
43.	May 1930	French Championships	Paris, France	Clay	(France) Arlette Neufeld	2R
44.	Aug 1931	Seabright Invitational	Seabright, NJ, US	Grass	(United States) Helen Jacobs	F
45.	Aug 1931	U.S. Championships	New York, NY, US	Grass	(United States) Edith Sigourney	1R
46.	Jul 1932	Strasbourg LTC International	Strasbourg, France	Clay	(Germany) Frau Richter	SF
47.	Jun 1933	Wimbledon	London, UK	Grass	(United States) Elizbeth Macready	2R
48.	Jun 1935	Kent Championships	Beckenham, UK	Grass	(United Kingdom) Sheila Chuter	1R
49.	Jun 1938	London Championships (Queen's)	London, UK	Grass	(United States) Tiny Alston	3R
50.	Jul 1938	Irish Championships	Dublin, Ireland	Grass	(United States) Joy Myerscough	QF

Helen Wills: Tennis, Art, Life

== Performance timelines ==
Key
W	F	SF	QF	#R	RR	Q#	DNQ	A	NH

(W) winner; (F) finalist; (SF) semifinalist; (QF) quarterfinalist; (#R) rounds 4, 3, 2, 1; (RR) round-robin stage; (Q#) qualification round; (DNQ) did not qualify; (A) absent; (NH) not held; (SR) strike rate (events won / competed); (W–L) win–loss record.

=== Singles ===
Tournament	1922	1923	1924	1925	1926	1927	1928	1929	1930	1931	1932	1933	1934	1935	1936	1937	1938	SR	W–L	Win %
Australian Championships	A	A	A	A	A	A	A	A	A	A	A	A	A	A	A	A	A	0 / 0	0–0	–
French Championships	A	A	A	A	2R	A	W	W	W	A	W	A	A	A	A	A	A	4 / 5	20–0	100%
Wimbledon	A	A	F	A	1R	W	W	W	W	A	W	W	A	W	A	A	W	8 / 10	55–1	98%
U.S. National Championships	F	W	W	W	A	W	W	W	A	W	A	F	A	A	A	A	A	7 / 9	51–2	96%
Win–loss	5–1	6–0	11–1	6–0	1–0	13–0	16–0	16–0	11–0	6–0	11–0	11–1	0–0	7–0	0–0	0–0	6–0	19 / 24	126–3	98%

Note 1: Wills withdrew from both the French Championships and Wimbledon Championships in 1926 after having an appendectomy. The French walkover is not counted as a loss. One week prior to Wimbledon, the tournament was informed that she would not play. She was given a default from her opening round match, which Wimbledon does not consider to be a "loss".

Note 2: Prior to 1925, the French Championships was not open to international players.

=== Doubles ===
Tournament	1922	1923	1924	1925	1926	1927	1928	1929	1930	1931	1932	1933	Career SR
Australian Championships	A	A	A	A	A	A	A	A	A	A	A	A	0 / 0
French Championships^{1}	NH	NH	NH	A	A	A	QF	QF	W	A	W	A	2 / 4
Wimbledon	A	A	W	A	A	W	A	3R	W	A	A	A	3 / 4
U.S. Championships	W	A	W	W	A	A	W	A	A	A	A	W	4 / 5
SR	0 / 1	1 / 1	1 / 2	1 / 1	0 / 2	2 / 2	3 / 3	3 / 3	2 / 2	1 / 1	2 / 2	1 / 2	9 / 13

=== Mixed doubles ===
Tournament	1922	1923	1924	1925	1926	1927	1928	1929	1930	1931	1932	1933	Career SR
Australian Championships	A	A	A	A	A	A	A	A	A	A	A	A	0 / 0
French Championships^{1}	NH	NH	NH	A	A	A	F	F	A	A	F	A	0 / 3
Wimbledon	A	A	A	A	A	A	SF	W	A	A	QF	QF	1 / 4
U.S. Championships	F	A	W	A	A	A	W	A	A	A	A	A	2 / 3
SR	0 / 1	0 / 0	1 / 1	0 / 0	0 / 0	0 / 0	1 / 3	1 / 2	0 / 0	0 / 0	0 / 2	0 / 1	3 / 10

== Longest winning streaks and records ==
- 180 match win streak from 1927–1933.
- Did not lose a set from 1927–1933.
- Wills was ranked world No. 1 for eight years.

== See also ==
- Suzanne Lenglen career statistics
