= Longwood Bowl =

Defunct tennis tournament
- Founded: 1891; 134 years ago
- Abolished: 1949; 76 years ago
- Location: Brookline, Massachusetts, United States
- Venue: Longwood Cricket Club
- Surface: Grass

The Longwood Bowl was a men's and women's tennis tournament first played at the Longwood Cricket Club courts at Brookline, Massachusetts, United States from 1882 to 1949.

The men's tournament was also known as the Longwood Challenge Bowl. The first women's event was the Longwood Tennis Cup it later became known as the Longwood Bowl Invitational.

== History ==
In 1877 the Longwood Cricket Club was founded. In 1881 the club held its first tennis tournament. In 1882 the club held its first important tennis event the Longwood Cricket Club Tournament it was the precursor event to the Longwood Bowl also known as the Longwood Challenge Bowl tournament founded in 1891. The men's event was held through till 1942 when it was discontinued, and the women's event continued on till 1949 before it was also abolished.

The tournament was played for the entire time at Brookline, Massachusetts where Longwood Cricket Club's tennis courts are located. In 1922 the club house and administrative center was moved to Newton, Massachusetts. The winners of the men's tournament retain a permanent replica of the Longwood Bowl Trophy if they win it three times.

== Finals ==
=== Men's singles ===
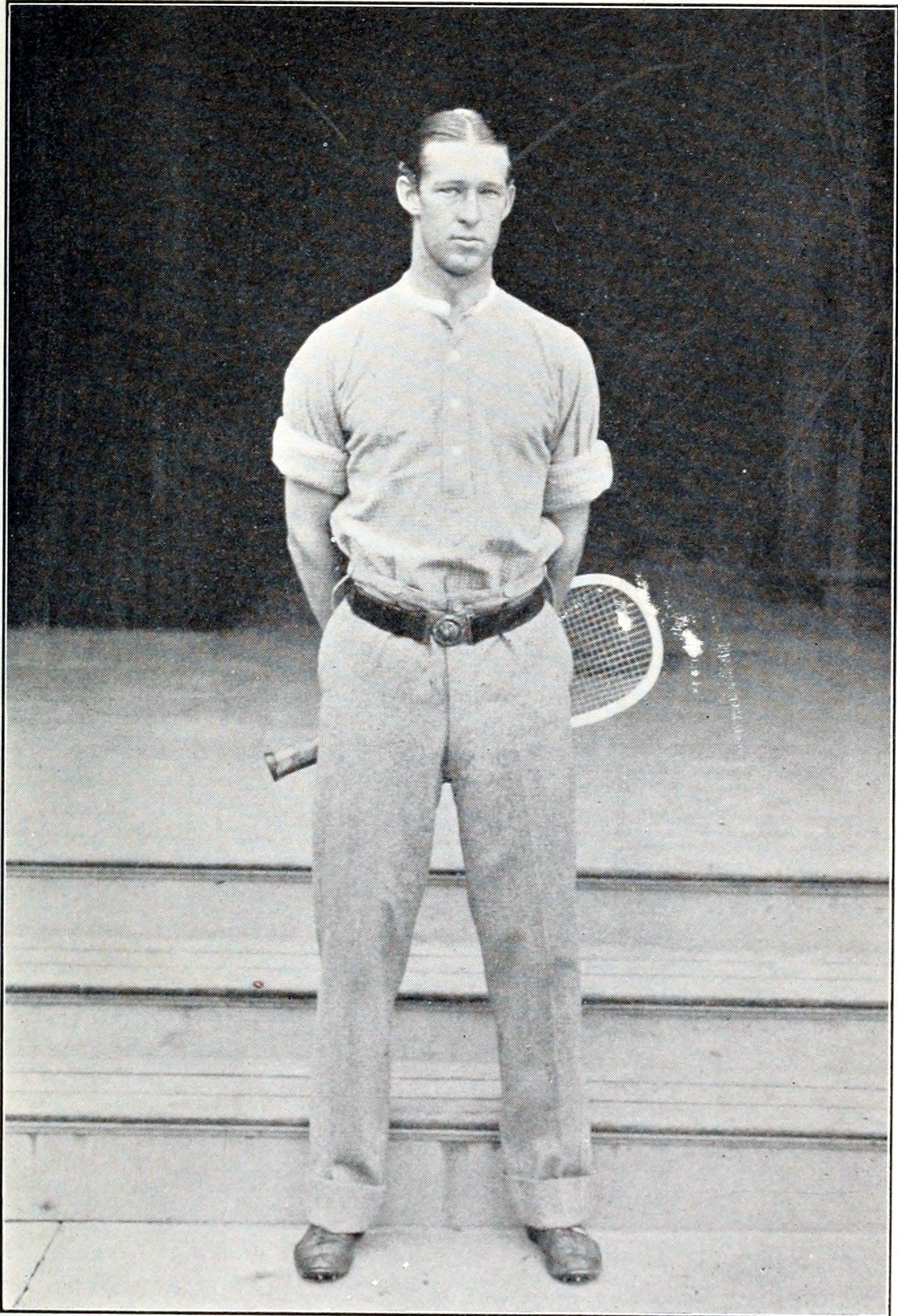
William Augustus Larned was the most successful men's player winning 11 singles titles.

Incomplete roll included:

Longwood Tournament
| Year | Winner | Runner-up | Score |
Longwood Cricket Club Tournament
| 1882 | (United States) Mr Winslow | (United States) Warren W. Smith | 0–6, 6–3, 4–6, 6–2, 6–3 |
| 1883 | (United States) Joseph Sill Clark | (United States) James Dwight | 6–4, 6–3, 5–7, 6–4 |
| 1884 | (United States) James Dwight | (United States) Quincy Adams Shaw Jr. | ? |
| 1885 | (United States) Howard Augustus Taylor | (United States) ? | ? |
Longwood Bowl
| 1891 | (United States) Eddie Hall Jr. | (United States) Philip Shelton Sears | 6–1, 8–6, 6–3 |
| 1892 | (United States) Fred Hovey | (United States) Eddie Hall Jr. | 6–3, 7–5, 1–6, 4–6, 6–2 |
| 1893 | (United States) Fred Hovey (2) | (United States) Richard W. Stevens | 8–6, 7–5, 8–6 |
| 1894 | (United States) William Larned | (United States) Richard W. Stevens | 6–2, 6–4, 6–2 |
| 1895 | (United States) William Larned (2) | (United States) Fred Hovey | 6–4, 6–4, 4–6, 6–4 |
| 1897 | (United States) William Larned (3) | (United States) Bob Wrenn | 6–2, 9–7, 2–6, 4–6, 6–2 |
| 1898 | (United States) Mal Whitman | (United States) Leo Ware | 8–6, 6–3, 0–6, 6–3 |
| 1899 | (United States) Mal Whitman (2) | (United States) Dwight Filley Davis Sr. | 6–1, 6–4, 7–5 |
| 1901 | (United States) William Larned (4) | ? | ? |
| 1902 | (United States) William Jackson Clothier | (United States) William Larned | 6–3, 3–6, 6–2, 7–5 |
| 1903 | (United States) William Larned (5) | (United States) William Jackson Clothier | 2–6, 6–4, 6–0, 6–2 |
| 1904 | (United States) William Larned (6) | (United States) Holcombe Ward | 3–1 sets |
| 1905 | (United States) William Larned (7) | ? | ? |
| 1906 | (United States) William Larned (8) | (United States) Karl Howell Behr Jr. | 8–6, 3–6, 6–2, 6–3 |
| 1907 | (United States) William Larned (9) | (United States) Clarence Hobart | w.o. |
| 1908 | (United States) William Larned (10) | (United States) Raymond D. Little | ? |
| 1909 | (United States) William Larned (11) | ? | ? |
| 1919 | (United States) Bill Johnston | (United States) Dick Williams Jr. | 6–3, 6–3, 6–4 |
| 1920 | (United States) Bill Johnston (2) | (United States) Nat Niles | 6–4, 6–0, 6–0 |
| 1921 | (United States) Bill Johnston (3) | (United States) Dick Williams Jr. | 6–4, 6–2, 3–6, 8–6 |
| 1922 | (United States) Bill Tilden II | (United States) Dick Williams Jr. | 6–1, 8–6, 5–7, 6–0 |
| 1923 | (United States) Dick Williams Jr. | (Japan) Takeichi Harada | 6–2, 6–4, 6–2 |
| 1924 | (United States) Fritz Mercur | (United States) Lawrence Bridges Rice | 4–6, 1–6, 6–4, 6–3, 6–4 |
| 1925 | (Australia) Gerald Patterson | (United States) Lawrence Bridges Rice | 4–6, 1–6, 6–4, 6–3, 6–4 |
| 1926 | (United States) Bill Tilden II (2) | (United States) Lewis Nelson White | 6–3, 6–4, 6–3 |
| 1927 | (United States) John Doeg | (United States) Cranston Holman | 6–8, 10–8, 8–6, 6–3 |
| 1928 | (United States) Wilmer Allison Jr. | (United States) John Van Ryn | 7–9, 6–4, 6–2, 6–2 |
| 1929 | (United States) John Doeg (2) | (United States) Fritz Mercur | 10–8, 6–4, 8–6 |
| 1930 | (United States) Cliff Sutter | (United States) Sidney Wood Jr. | 5–7, 6–4, 6–3, 6–2 |
| 1931 | (United States) Ellsworth Vines | (United States) John Doeg | 4–6, 6–3, 6–3, 3–6, 6–3 |
| 1932 | (United States) Arnold Wheeler Jones | (United States) Jack Tidball | 6–3, 6–4, 6–1 |
| 1933 | (United States) Richard T. Murphy | (United States) Martin Buxby | 8–6, 6–4, 6–2 |
| 1934 | (United States) Wilmer Allison Jr. (2) | (United States) Berkeley Bell | 4–6, 6–1, 6–2, 6–3 |
| 1935 | (United States) Wilmer Moore Hines | (United States) Norcross S. Tilney | 6–1, 6–1, 6–4 |
| 1936 | (United States) Frank Parker | (United States) Bobby Riggs | 6–2, 2–6, 6–3, 7–5 |
| 1937 | (United States) Wilmer Allison Jr. (3) | (United States) Gilbert A. Hunt | 2–6, 6–3, 6–0, 6–4 |
| 1938 | (United States) Bobby Riggs | (United States) Frank Kovacs | 6–4, 6–0, 6–4 |
| 1939 | (Australia) Adrian Quist | (United States) Gene Mako | 6–1, 6–2, 6–4 |
| 1942 | (Ecuador) Pancho Segura | (United States) Gardnar Mulloy | 6–1, 8–6, 6–3 |

=== Women's singles ===
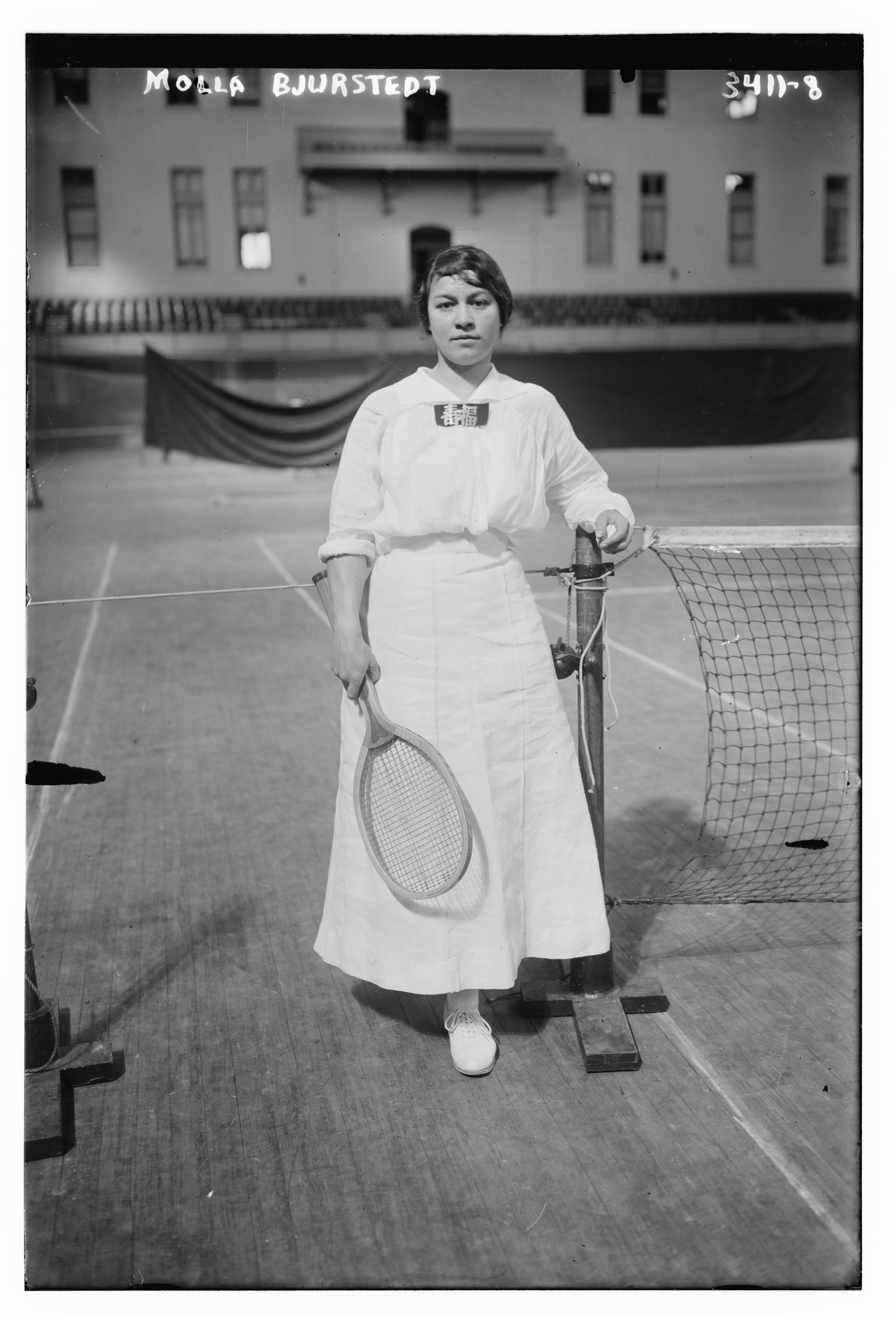
Molla Bjurstedt Mallory was the joint most successful women's player with Elizabeth Ryan winning 4 singles titles.

Incomplete roll

Notes:

Longwood Tournament
| Year | Winner | Runner-up | Score |
Longwood Tennis Cup
| 1895 | (United States) Miss Mary Larned | (United States) Miss Hovey | ? |
Longwood Bowl Ladies Tournament
| 1898 | (United States) Margaret Hunnewell | (United States) Miss Nichols | 6–2, 6–3, 6–0 |
| 1899 | (United States) Margaret Hunnewell (2) | (United States) Miss Nichols | 4–6, 5–7, 12–10, 6–3, 6–2 |
| 1900 | (United States) Margaret Hunnewell (3) | (United States) Myrtle McAteer | 2–6, 1–6, 6–2, 7–5, 6–2 |
| 1901 | (United States) Eleanor Stockton | (United States) Miss Sears | 4–6, 6–4, 6–6, 7–5, 6–3 |
| 1902 | (United States) Eleanor Stockton (2) | (United States) Jane Stockton | 6–4, 5–7, 6–1 |
| 1903 | (United States) Margaret Homer Nichols | ? | ? |
| 1904 | (United States) Margaret Homer Nichols (2) | ? | ? |
| 1905 | (United States) Evelyn Sears | (United States) Maud Barger-Wallach | 8–6, 6–2 |
| 1906 | (United States) May Sutton | (United States) Marion Fenno | 6–0, 6–0 |
| 1907 | (United States) Evelyn Sears (2) | (United States) Maud Barger-Wallach | 8–6, 6–2 |
| 1908 | (United States) Maud Barger-Wallach | (United States) Evelyn Sears | ? |
| 1909 | (United States) Maud Barger-Wallach (2) | (United States) Evelyn Sears | 6–3, 2–6, 6–3 |
| 1910 | (United States) Louise Hammond | (United States) Maud Barger-Wallach | 4–6, 6–3, 6–2 |
| 1911 | (United States) Hazel Hotchkiss | (United States) Edith Rotch | 6–2, 6–0 |
| 1912 | (United States) Mary K. Browne | (United States) Eleonora Sears | 13–11, 6–4 |
| 1913 | (United States) Hazel Hotchkiss Wightman (2) | (United States) Mary K. Browne | 6–0, 6–2 |
Longwood Bowl Open
| 1914 | (United States) Edith Rotch | (United States) Evelyn Sears | 4–6, 7–5, 6–0 |
| 1915 | (Norway) Molla Bjurstedt | (United States) Edith Rotch | 6–2, 6–2 |
| 1916 | (United States) Evelyn Sears | (Norway) Molla Bjurstedt | 3–6, 6–3, 6–2 |
| 1917 | (United States) Nancy Sheafe Cole | (United States) Evelyn Sears | 6–2, 6–2 |
| 1918 | (Norway) Molla Bjurstedt (2) | (United States) Hazel Hotchkiss Wightman | 6–1, 10–8 |
| 1919 | (United States) Hazel Hotchkiss Wightman (3) | (United States) Marion Zinderstein | ? |
| 1920 | (United States) Marion Zinderstein | (United States) Eleanor Tennant | 6–4, 6–3 |
| 1921 | (United States) Leslie Bancroft | (United States) Catherine Gardner | 6–3, 6–1 |
Longwood Bowl Invitation
| 1922 | (United States) Molla Bjurstedt Mallory (3) | (United States) Helen Wills | 3–6, 6–3, 7–5 |
| 1923 | (United States) Molla Bjurstedt Mallory (4) | (United Kingdom) Kitty Mckane | 6–2, 6–1 |
| 1924 | (United States) Eleanor Goss | (United States) Helen Jacobs | 6–3, 6–2 |
| 1925 (Jul) | (United States) Helen Wills | (United States) Marion Zinderstein Jessup | 7–5, 6–2 |
| 1925 (Aug) | (United States) Elizabeth Ryan | (United Kingdom) Joan Fryy | 6–1, 6–1 |
Longwood Bowl (Fall)
| 1925 (Oct) | (United States) Elizabeth Ryan (2) | (United States) Anna Townsend Godfrey | 6–2, 6–2 |
Longwood Bowl Invitation
| 1926 (Jul) | (United States) Elizabeth Ryan (3) | (United States) Martha Bayard | 6–0, 3–6, 6–3 |
Longwood Bowl (Fall)
| 1926 (Oct) | (United States) Elizabeth Ryan (4) | (United States) Hazel Hotchkiss Wightman | 6–3, 6–4 |
Longwood Bowl Invitation
| 1927 | (United States) Sarah Palfrey | ? | ? |
| 1928 | (United States) Eleanor Goss | (United States) Elizabeth Barber Corbiere | 3–6, 6–1, 6–4 |
| 1929 | (United States) Ethel Burkhardt | (United States) Dorothy Andrus | 0–6, 6–4, 6–3 |
| 1930 | (United States) Anna McCune Harper | (United States) Dorothy Weisel | 7–5, 6–1 |
| 1931 | (United States) Dorothy Andrus | (United States) Sarah Palfrey | 6–2, 1–6, 6–4 |
| 1932 | (United States) Marjorie Gladman Van Ryn | (United States) Marjorie Sachs | 5–7, 6–1, 6–1 |
| 1933 | (United States) Alice Marble | (United States) Carolin Babcock | 6–3, 6–4 |
| 1934 | (United States) Sarah Palfrey (2) | (United States) Jane Sharp | 6–4, 6–2 |
| 1935 | (United States) Marjorie Gladman Van Ryn (2) | (United States) Helen Pedersen | 7–5, 6–3 |
| 1936 | (United States) Alice Marble | (United States) Carolyn Roberts | 6–1, 8–6 |
| 1937 | (United States) Marjorie Gladman Van Ryn (3) | (United States) Helen Pedersen | 6–3, 6–4 |
| 1938 | (United States) Helen Bernhard | (United States) Virginia Wolfenden | 6–3, 6–3 |
| 1939 | (United States) Helen Bernhard (2) | (United States) Kay Winthrop | 6–4, 6–4 |
| 1942 | (United States) Louise Brough | (United States) Margaret Osborne | 6–2, 6–1 |
| 1944 | (United States) Pauline Betz | (United States) Louise Brough | 6–4, 6–3 |
| 1945 | (United States) Pauline Betz (2) | (United States) Margaret Osborne | 6–4, 8–6 |
| 1946 | (United States) Louise Brough (2) | (United States) Margaret Osborne | 6–3, 6–2 |
Longwood Invitational
| 1948 | (Romania) Magda Berescu Rurac | ? | ? |
| 1949 | (United States) Betty Clements Hilton | (United Kingdom) Jean Walker-Smith | 6–4, 6–8, 6–2 |
