= 1930 U.S. National Championships – Women's singles =

Women's singles
- 1930 U.S. National Championships

Final
- Champion: (United Kingdom) Betty Nuthall
- Runner-up: (United States) Anna Harper
- Score: 6–1, 6–4

Events
| Singles | men | women |
| Doubles | men | women |
| ← 1929 · | U.S. National Championships | · 1931 → |

Top-seeded foreign player Betty Nuthall defeated Anna Harper 6–1, 6–4 in the final to win the women's singles tennis title at the 1930 U.S. National Championships which was held between August 18 and 23, 1930. The final lasted 36 minutes and was watched by 3,500 spectators. The reigning champion Helen Wills Moody did not participate to defend her title.

== Seeds ==
The tournament used two lists of players for seeding the women's singles event; one list of eight U.S. players and one for foreign players which contained two players. Betty Nuthall is the champion; others show in brackets the round in which they were eliminated.

1. (United States) Marjorie Morrill (semifinals)
2. (United States) Anna Harper (finalist)
3. (United States) Eleanor Goss (second round)
4. (United States) Sarah Palfrey (third round)
5. (United States) Ethel Burkhardt (quarterfinals)
6. (United States) Mary Greef (quarterfinals)
7. (United States) Edith Cross (third round)
8. (United States) Josephine Cruickshank (third round)
9. (United Kingdom) Betty Nuthall (champion)
10. (Italy) Maud Levi (semifinals)

== Draw ==
=== Final eight ===
Quarterfinals
(1) | (United Kingdom) Betty Nuthall | 6 | 6
(United States) Dorothy Weisel | 1 | 1
1 | (United States) Marjorie Morrill | 4 | 6 | 6
5 | (United States) Ethel Burkhardt | 6 | 1 | 2
2 | (United States) Anna Harper | 3 | 6 | 6
6 | (United States) Mary Greef | 6 | 1 | 4
(United States) Penelope Anderson | 6 | 4 | 5
(2) | (Italy) Maud Levi | 4 | 6 | 7

Semifinals
(1) | (United Kingdom) Betty Nuthall | 6 | 6 | 6
1 | (United States) Marjorie Morrill | 8 | 4 | 2
2 | (United States) Anna Harper | 6 | 6
(2) | (Italy) Maud Levi | 2 | 3

Finals
(1) | (United Kingdom) Betty Nuthall | 6 | 6
2 | (United States) Anna Harper | 1 | 4

| Preceded by 1930 Wimbledon Championships – Women's singles | Grand Slam women's singles | Succeeded by 1931 Australian Championships – Women's singles |
