= 1932 Pacific Southwest Championships =

- Date: September 16–26
- Edition: 6th
- Category: Amateur
- Surface: Hard / outdoor
- Location: Los Angeles, California, U.S.
- Venue: Los Angeles Tennis Club

Champions

Men's singles
- (United Kingdom) Fred Perry

Women's singles
- (United States) Anna McCune Harper

Men's doubles
- (United States) Wilmer Allison / (United States) John Van Ryn

Women's doubles
- (United States) Carolin Babcock / (United States) Sarah Palfrey

Mixed doubles
- (United States) Sarah Palfrey / (United Kingdom) Fred Perry
← 1931 ·	Pacific Southwest Open	· 1933 →

The 1932 Pacific Southwest Championships was a combined men's and women's amateur tennis tournament played on outdoor hard courts at the Los Angeles Tennis Club in Los Angeles, California in the United States. It was the sixth edition of the tournament and took place from September 16 through September 26, 1932. Fred Perry and Anna McCune Harper won the singles titles.

== Finals ==
=== Men's singles ===
(United Kingdom) Fred Perry defeated (Japan) Jiro Satoh 6–2, 6–4, 7–5

=== Women's singles ===
(United States) Anna McCune Harper defeated (United States) Alice Marble 10–8, 6–3

=== Men's doubles ===
(United States) Wilmer Allison / (United States) John Van Ryn defeated (United States) Keith Gledhill / (United States) Ellsworth Vines 6–3, 6–4, 6–4

=== Women's doubles ===
(United States) Carolin Babcock / (United States) Sarah Palfrey defeated (United States) Anna McCune Harper / (United States) Alice Marble 6–2, 7–9, 7–5

=== Mixed doubles ===
(United States) Sarah Palfrey / (United Kingdom) Fred Perry defeated (United States) Anna McCune Harper / (Japan) Jiro Satoh 6–3, 6–2
