= Ethel Burkhardt Arnold =

America tennis player

- Country (sports): United States
- Born: United States
- Died: United States
- Height: 5 ft 0 in (1.52 m)
- Plays: Right-handed

Singles

Grand Slam singles results
- US Open: QF (1930)

Ethel Burkhardt Arnold (née Burkhardt) was a female tennis player from the United States who was active in the late 1920s and 1930s.

At the 1930 U.S. Championships she was fifth-seeded U.S. player and reached the quarterfinals of the singles event, which she lost in three sets to the top-seeded U.S. player Marjorie Morrill.

She married Albert M. Arnold, a salesman from San Francisco, in May 1931. After her marriage she only played tournaments on the American West coast until 1935. Between 1934 and 1935 she won 14 consecutive tournaments.

Burkhardt Arnold was ranked in the top 10 of U.S. women in 1929, 1930, 1931 and 1935. She reached her highest ranking in 1935 as the No.2 player behind Helen Jacobs.

In August 1935, she was a member of the United States team for the Wightman Cup contest against Great Britain, held at the West Side Tennis Club in Forest Hills in New York City. The United States team won the event 4–3 and Burkhardt Arnold competed in two singles matches. She lost her first match in two sets to Dorothy Round but won her second match, the decisive tie of the contest, against Kay Stammers in three sets.

She twice won the singles title at the Pacific Coast Championships which was held during those years in Berkely. At the 1929 edition she defeated Anna McCune Harper in the final in two sets and in 1935 won her second title after a two-set victory in the final against Carolin Babcock. After the tournament she became a professional. She made her professional debut in January 1936 at the Madison Square Garden in New York and competed in a series of matches against Jane Sharp.

In 1974 she was inducted into the USTA Northern California Hall of Fame which was established that year.
