= 1931 U.S. National Championships – Women's singles =

Women's singles
- 1931 U.S. National Championships

Final
- Champion: (United States) Helen Wills Moody
- Runner-up: (United Kingdom) Eileen Bennett Whittingstall
- Score: 6–4, 6–1

Events
Singles	men	women
Doubles	men	women
← 1930 ·	U.S. National Championships	· 1932 →

First-seeded Helen Wills Moody defeated Eileen Bennett Whittingstall 6–4, 6–1 in the final to win the women's singles tennis title at the 1931 U.S. National Championships. Wills Moody won the tournament without losing a set.

== Seeds ==
The tournament used two lists of eight players for seeding the women's singles event; one for U.S. players and one for foreign players. Helen Wills Moody is the champion; others show in brackets the round in which they were eliminated.

1. (United States) Helen Wills Moody (champion)
2. (United States) Helen Jacobs (quarterfinals)
3. (United States) Anna McCune Harper (quarterfinals)
4. (United States) Marion Zinderstein Jessup (third round)
5. (United States) Marjorie Morrill (second round)
6. (United States) Marjorie Gladman Van Ryn (second round)
7. (United States) Dorothy Weisel (quarterfinals)
8. (United States) Josephine Cruickshank (third round)
1. (United Kingdom) Betty Nuthall (semifinals)
2. (United Kingdom) Phyllis Mudford (semifinals)
3. (United Kingdom) Dorothy Round (third round)
4. (United Kingdom) Eileen Bennett Whittingstall (finalist)
5. (United Kingdom) Dorothy Shepherd-Barron (quarterfinals)
6. (United Kingdom) Joan Ridley (third round)
7. (United Kingdom) Elsie Goldsack Pittman (third round)
8. (Italy) Baroness Maud Levi (first round)

== Draw ==
=== Final eight ===
Quarterfinals
1	(United States) Helen Wills Moody	6	6
7	(United States) Dorothy Weisel	1	2
3	(United States) Anna McCune Harper	6	3	2
(2)	(United Kingdom) Phyllis Mudford	4	6	6
2	(United States) Helen Jacobs	6	3	6
(3)	(United Kingdom) Eileen Bennett Whittingstall	3	6	8
(5)	(United Kingdom) Dorothy Shepherd-Barron	2	1
(1)	(United Kingdom) Betty Nuthall	6	6

Semifinals
1	(United States) Helen Wills Moody	6	6
(2)	(United Kingdom) Phyllis Mudford	2	4
(4)	(United Kingdom) Eileen Bennett Whittingstall	6	3	6
(1)	(United Kingdom) Betty Nuthall	2	6	4

Finals
1	(United States) Helen Wills Moody	6	6
(4)	(United Kingdom) Eileen Bennett Whittingstall	4	1

Preceded by 1931 Wimbledon Championships – Women's singles	Grand Slam women's singles	Succeeded by 1932 Australian Championships – Women's singles
