= 1932 U.S. National Championships – Women's singles =

Women's singles
- 1932 U.S. National Championships

Final
- Champion: (United States) Helen Jacobs
- Runner-up: (United States) Carolin Babcock
- Score: 6–2, 6–2

Events
Singles	men	women
Doubles	men	women
← 1931 ·	U.S. National Championships	· 1933 →

First-seeded Helen Jacobs defeated Carolin Babcock 6–2, 6–2 in the final to win the women's singles tennis title at the 1932 U.S. National Championships.

== Seeds ==
The tournament used two lists of players for seeding the women's singles event; one list of eight U.S. players and a list for three foreign players. Helen Jacobs is the champion; others show in brackets the round in which they were eliminated.

1. (United States) Helen Jacobs (champion)
2. (United States) Anna McCune Harper (quarterfinals)
3. (United States) Marjorie Morrill (quarterfinals)
4. (United States) Josephine Cruickshank (third round)
5. (United States) Sarah Palfrey (first round)
6. (United States) Carolin Babcock (finalist)
7. (United States) Virginia Hilleary (third round)
8. (United States) Marjorie Gladman Van Ryn (quarterfinals)
9. (United Kingdom) Elsie Goldsack Pittman (semifinals)
10. (United Kingdom) Joan Ridley (semifinals)
11. (Canada) Marjorie Leeming (third round)

== Draw ==
=== Final eight ===
Quarterfinals
1	(United States) Helen Jacobs	3	6	6
8	(United States) Marjorie Gladman Van Ryn	6	3	1
(1)	(United Kingdom) Elsie Goldsack Pittman	6	6
(United States) Mary Greef	3	2
6	(United States) Carolin Babcock	6	7
2	(United States) Anna McCune Harper	3	5
(2)	(United Kingdom) Joan Ridley	3	8	6
2	(United States) Marjorie Morrill	6	6	4

Semifinals
1	(United States) Helen Jacobs	6	6
(1)	(United Kingdom) Elsie Goldsack Pittman	2	3
6	(United States) Carolin Babcock	4	7	6
(2)	(United Kingdom) Joan Ridley	6	5	3

Finals
1	(United States) Helen Jacobs	6	6
(4)	(United States) Carolin Babcock	2	2

Preceded by 1932 Wimbledon Championships – Women's singles	Grand Slam women's singles	Succeeded by 1933 Australian Championships – Women's singles
