= 1932 International Lawn Tennis Challenge =

1932 edition of the International Lawn Tennis Challenge

Details
- Duration: 28 April – 31 July 1932
- Edition: 27th
- Teams: 29

Champion
- Winning nation: France

The 1932 International Lawn Tennis Challenge was the 27th edition of what is now known as the Davis Cup. 22 teams would enter the Europe Zone; while 8 would enter the Americas Zone, 5 in North America and 3 in South America.

The United States defeated Brazil in the America Inter-Zonal Final, after Brazil received two walkovers in the South America Zone, and then defeated Germany in the Inter-Zonal play-off. France defeated the US in the Challenge Round, giving them their sixth straight title. The final was played 29–31 July at Stade Roland Garros in Paris.

== America Zone ==
=== North & Central America Zone ===
Quarterfinals; 28–30 April
Chevy Chase, MD, United States (clay)
United States	5
Canada	0
Mexico
bye
bye
Australia
bye
Cuba

Semifinals; 13–15 May
New Orleans, LA, United States (clay)
United States	5
Mexico	0
Havana, Cuba
Australia	5
Cuba	0

Final; 27–30 May
Philadelphia, PA, United States (clay)
United States	5
Australia	0

=== South America Zone ===
Semifinals
Brazil	w/o
Chile
bye
Paraguay

Final
Brazil	w/o
Paraguay

=== Americas Inter-Zonal Final ===
United States vs. Brazil

United States
5
West Side Tennis Club, Forest Hills, New York
9–11 June 1932
Clay

Brazil
0

			1	2	3	4	5
1	(United States) (Brazil)	Wilmer Allison; Nelson Cruz	6; 3	6; 2	6; 3
2	(United States) (Brazil)	Frank Shields; Ricardo Pernambuco	6; 1	6; 3	0; 6	6; 4
3	(United States) (Brazil)	Wilmer Allison / John Van Ryn; Ricardo Pernambuco / Ultimo Simone	6; 1	6; 1	6; 2
4	(United States) (Brazil)	Wilmer Allison; Ricardo Pernambuco	6; 1	6; 2	6; 0
5	(United States) (Brazil)	John Van Ryn; Ultimo Simone	6; 2	6; 0	6; 0

== Europe Zone ==
=== Draw ===
First Round; 3–12 May
Denmark
bye
Yugoslavia
bye
Greece
bye
Japan
bye
Spain
bye
Italy	3
Egypt	2
Norway	0
Monaco	5
Belgium	0
Switzerland	5
Czechoslovakia	2
Austria	3
Germany	5
India	0
Hungary	5
Finland	0
bye
Ireland
bye
Great Britain
bye
Romania
bye
Poland
bye
Netherlands

Second Round; 11–23 May
Copenhagen, Denmark
Denmark	4
Yugoslavia	1
Athens, Greece
Greece	0
Japan	5
Rome, Italy (clay)
Spain	1
Italy	4
Lucerne, Switzerland
Monaco	2
Switzerland	3
Vienna, Austria
Austria	2
Germany	3
Dublin, Ireland (grass)
Hungary	1
Ireland	4
Torquay, England (clay)
Great Britain	5
Romania	0
Warsaw, Poland
Poland	4
Netherlands	1

Quarterfinals; 10–14 June
Copenhagen, Denmark
Denmark	0
Japan	5
Montreux, Switzerland
Italy	3
Switzerland	2
Berlin, Germany
Germany	4
Ireland	1
Warsaw, Poland (clay)
Great Britain	4
Poland	1

Semifinals; 8–10 July
Milan, Italy (clay)
Japan	2
Italy	3
Berlin, Germany (clay)
Germany	3
Great Britain	2

Final; 15–17 July
Milan, Italy (clay)
Italy	0
Germany	5

=== Final ===
Italy vs. Germany

Italy
0
Milan, Italy
15–17 July 1932
Clay

Germany
5

			1	2	3	4	5
1	(Italy) (Germany)	Giovanni Palmieri; Gottfried von Cramm	3; 6	4; 6	0; 6
2	(Italy) (Germany)	Giorgio de Stefani; Daniel Prenn	1; 6	4; 6	6; 1	2; 6
3	(Italy) (Germany)	Alberto del Bono / Giorgio de Stefani; Gottfried von Cramm / Daniel Prenn	3; 6	3; 6	2; 6
4	(Italy) (Germany)	Giovanni Palmieri; Gustav Jaenecke	3; 6	6; 0	1; 6	6; 2	1; 6
5	(Italy) (Germany)	Alberto del Bono; Gottfried von Cramm	6; 8	3; 6	6; 3	1; 6

== Inter-Zonal Final ==
United States vs. Germany

United States
3
Stade Roland Garros, Paris, France
22–24 July 1932
Clay

Germany
2

			1	2	3	4	5
1	(United States) (Germany)	Frank Shields; Gottfried von Cramm	5; 7	7; 5	4; 6	6; 8
2	(United States) (Germany)	Ellsworth Vines; Daniel Prenn	6; 3	6; 3	0; 6	6; 4
3	(United States) (Germany)	Wilmer Allison / John Van Ryn; Gottfried von Cramm / Daniel Prenn	6; 3	6; 4	6; 1
4	(United States) (Germany)	Ellsworth Vines; Gottfried von Cramm	3; 6	6; 3	9; 7	6; 3
5	(United States) (Germany)	Frank Shields; Daniel Prenn	1; 6	0; 6	8; 6	2; 6

== Challenge Round ==
France vs. United States

France
3
Stade Roland Garros, Paris, France
29–31 July 1932
Clay

United States
2

			1	2	3	4	5
1	(France) (United States)	Jean Borotra; Ellsworth Vines	6; 4	6; 2	3; 6	6; 4
2	(France) (United States)	Henri Cochet; Wilmer Allison	5; 7	7; 5	7; 5	6; 2
3	(France) (United States)	Jacques Brugnon / Henri Cochet; Wilmer Allison / John Van Ryn	3; 6	13; 11	5; 7	6; 4	4; 6
4	(France) (United States)	Jean Borotra; Wilmer Allison	1; 6	3; 6	6; 4	6; 2	7; 5
5	(France) (United States)	Henri Cochet; Ellsworth Vines	6; 4	6; 0	5; 7	6; 8	2; 6

== See also ==
- 1932 Wightman Cup
