= 1932 Wightman Cup =

International women's tennis competition

Details
- Edition: 10th

Champion
- Winning nation: United States

The 1932 Wightman Cup was the tenth edition of the annual women's team tennis competition between the United States and Great Britain. It was held on 10 and 11 June at the All England Lawn Tennis and Croquet Club in London, England.

Great Britain
3
All England Lawn Tennis and Croquet Club, London, England, United Kingdom
10–11 June 1932
Grass

United States
4

			1	2	3
1	(United Kingdom) (United States)	Dorothy Round; Helen Jacobs	4; 6	3; 6
2	(United Kingdom) (United States)	Eileen Bennett Whittingstall; Helen Wills Moody	2; 6	4; 6
3	(United Kingdom) (United States)	Dorothy Round; Helen Wills Moody	2; 6	3; 6
4	(United Kingdom) (United States)	Eileen Bennett Whittingstall; Helen Jacobs	6; 4	2; 6	6; 1
5	(United Kingdom) (United States)	Phyllis Mudford; Anna Harper	3; 6	6; 3	6; 1
6	(United Kingdom) (United States)	Peggy Mitchell / Dorothy Round; Anna Harper / Helen Jacobs	4; 6	1; 6
7	(United Kingdom) (United States)	Eileen Bennett Whittingstall / Betty Nuthall; Helen Wills Moody / Sarah Palfrey	6; 3	1; 6	10; 8

== See also ==
- 1932 Davis Cup
