= 1932 U.S. National Championships (tennis) =

- Date: September 3–10 (M); August 14–19 (W)
- Edition: 52nd
- Category: Grand Slam (ITF)
- Surface: Grass / Outdoor
- Location: Forest Hills, Queens; New York City, New York
- Venue: West Side Tennis Club

Champions

Men's singles
- (United States) Ellsworth Vines

Women's singles
- (United States) Helen Jacobs

Men's doubles
- (United States) Ellsworth Vines / (United States) Keith Gledhill

Women's doubles
- (United States) Helen Jacobs / (United States) Sarah Palfrey

Mixed doubles
- (United States) Sarah Palfrey / (United Kingdom) Fred Perry
← 1931 ·	U.S. National Championships	· 1933 →

The 1932 U.S. National Championships (now known as the US Open) was a tennis tournament that took place on the outdoor grass courts at the West Side Tennis Club, Forest Hills in New York City, New York. The tournament ran from September 3 until September 10. It was the 52nd staging of the U.S. National Championships and the fourth Grand Slam tennis event of the year.

== Finals ==
=== Men's singles ===
(United States) Ellsworth Vines defeated (France) Henri Cochet 6–4, 6–4, 6–4

=== Women's singles ===
(United States) Helen Jacobs defeated (United States) Carolin Babcock 6–2, 6–2

=== Men's doubles ===
(United States) Ellsworth Vines / (United States) Keith Gledhill defeated (United States) Wilmer Allison / (United States) John Van Ryn 6–4, 6–3, 6–2

=== Women's doubles ===
(United States) Helen Jacobs / (United States) Sarah Palfrey defeated (United States) Alice Marble / (United States) Marjorie Morrill 8–6, 6–1

=== Mixed doubles ===
(United States) Sarah Palfrey / (United Kingdom) Fred Perry defeated (United States) Helen Jacobs / (United States) Ellsworth Vines 6–3, 7–5

Preceded by 1932 Wimbledon Championships	Grand Slams	Succeeded by 1933 Australian Championships
