= 1928 U.S. National Championships (tennis) =

- Date: September 10–17 (M); August 20–27 (W)
- Edition: 48th
- Category: Grand Slam (ITF)
- Surface: Grass
- Location: Forest Hills, Queens; New York City, New York
- Venue: West Side Tennis Club

Champions

Men's singles
- (France) Henri Cochet

Women's singles
- (United States) Helen Wills

Men's doubles
- (United States) George Lott / (United States) John Hennessey

Women's doubles
- (United States) Hazel Hotchkiss Wightman / (United States) Helen Wills

Mixed doubles
- (United States) Helen Wills / (Australia) Jack Hawkes
← 1927 ·	U.S. National Championships	· 1929 →

The 1928 U.S. National Championships (now known as the US Open) was a tennis tournament that took place on the outdoor grass courts at the West Side Tennis Club, Forest Hills in New York City, New York. The women's tournament was held from August 20 until August 27 while the men's tournament ran from September 10 until September 17. It was the 48th staging of the U.S. National Championships and the fourth Grand Slam tennis event of the year.

== Finals ==
=== Men's singles ===
(France) Henri Cochet defeated (United States) Francis Hunter 4–6, 6–4, 3–6, 7–5, 6–3

=== Women's singles ===
(United States) Helen Wills defeated (United States) Helen Jacobs 6–2, 6–1

=== Men's doubles ===
(United States) George Lott / (United States) John Hennessey defeated (Australia) Gerald Patterson / (Australia) Jack Hawkes 6–2, 6–1, 6–2

=== Women's doubles ===
(United States) Hazel Hotchkiss Wightman / (United States) Helen Wills defeated (United States) Edith Cross / (United States) Anna McCune Harper 6–2, 6–2

=== Mixed doubles ===
(United States) Helen Wills / (Australia) Jack Hawkes defeated (United States) Edith Cross / (Australia) Edgar Moon 6–1, 6–3

Preceded by 1928 Wimbledon Championships	Grand Slams	Succeeded by 1929 Australian Championships
