= 1929 U.S. National Championships – Women's singles =

Women's singles
- 1929 U.S. National Championships

Final
- Champion: (United States) Helen Wills
- Runner-up: (United Kingdom) Phoebe Holcroft Watson
- Score: 6–4, 6–2

Events
Singles	men	women
Doubles	men	women
← 1928 ·	U.S. National Championships	· 1930 →

First-seeded Helen Wills defeated Phoebe Holcroft Watson 6–4, 6–2 in the final to win the women's singles tennis title at the 1929 U.S. National Championships. It was her sixth U.S. National singles title and her third in a row. Wills won the tournament without losing a set.

== Seeds ==
The tournament used a list of eight U.S. players and six foreign players for seeding the women's singles event. Helen Wills is the champion; others show in brackets the round in which they were eliminated.

1. (United States) Helen Wills (champion)
2. (United States) Helen Jacobs (semifinals)
3. (United States) Edith Cross (quarterfinals)
4. (United States) Molla Mallory (semifinals)
5. (United States) May Sutton Bundy (second round)
6. (United States) Mary Greef (quarterfinals)
7. (United States) Anna McCune Harper (third round)
8. (United States) Marjorie Gladman (third round)
1. (United Kingdom) Betty Nuthall (quarterfinals)
2. (United Kingdom) Phoebe Holcroft Watson (finalist)
3. (United Kingdom) Peggy Saunders Michell (quarterfinals)
4. (United Kingdom) Phyllis Covell (third round)
5. (United Kingdom) Dorothy Shepherd-Barron (quarterfinals)
6. (Canada) Olive Wade (first round)

== Draw ==
=== Final eight ===
Quarterfinals
1	(United States) Helen Wills	6	6
(3)	(United Kingdom) Peggy Saunders Michell	0	1
4	(United States) Molla Bjurstedt Mallory	6	6
(1)	(United Kingdom) Betty Nuthall	3	3
3	(United States) Edith Cross	6	1	3
(2)	(United Kingdom) Phoebe Holcroft Watson	2	6	6
6	(United States) Mary Greef	2	2
2	(United States) Helen Jacobs	6	6

Semifinals
1	(United States) Helen Wills	6	6
4	(United States) Molla Bjurstedt Mallory	0	0
(2)	(United Kingdom) Phoebe Holcroft Watson	6	3	6
2	(United States) Helen Jacobs	1	6	1

Finals
1	(United States) Helen Wills	6	6
(2)	(United Kingdom) Phoebe Holcroft Watson	4	2

Preceded by 1929 Wimbledon Championships – Women's singles	Grand Slam women's singles	Succeeded by 1930 Australian Championships – Women's singles
