= 1931 U.S. National Championships (tennis) =

- Date: September 3–10 (M); August 15–20 (W)
- Edition: 51st
- Category: Grand Slam (ITF)
- Surface: Grass / Outdoor
- Location: Forest Hills, Queens; New York City, New York
- Venue: West Side Tennis Club

Champions

Men's singles
- (United States) Ellsworth Vines

Women's singles
- (United States) Helen Wills Moody

Men's doubles
- (United States) Wilmer Allison / (United States) John Van Ryn

Women's doubles
- (United Kingdom) Betty Nuthall / (United Kingdom) Eileen Bennett Whittingstall

Mixed doubles
- (United Kingdom) Betty Nuthall / (United States) George Lott
| ← 1930 · | U.S. National Championships | · 1932 → |

The 1931 U.S. National Championships (now known as the US Open) was a tennis tournament that took place on the outdoor grass courts at the West Side Tennis Club, Forest Hills in New York City, New York. The tournament ran from September 3 until September 10. It was the 51st staging of the U.S. National Championships and the fourth Grand Slam tennis event of the year.

== Finals ==
=== Men's singles ===
(United States) Ellsworth Vines defeated (United States) George Lott 7–9, 6–3, 9–7, 7–5

=== Women's singles ===
(United States) Helen Wills Moody defeated (United Kingdom) Eileen Bennett Whittingstall 6–4, 6–1

=== Men's doubles ===
(United States) Wilmer Allison / (United States) John Van Ryn defeated (United States) Gregory Mangin / (United States) Berkeley Bell 6–4, 8–6, 6–3

=== Women's doubles ===
(United Kingdom) Betty Nuthall / (United Kingdom) Eileen Bennett Whittingstall defeated (United States) Helen Jacobs / (United Kingdom) Dorothy Round 6–2, 6–4

=== Mixed doubles ===
(United Kingdom) Betty Nuthall / (United States) George Lott defeated (United States) Anna McCune Harper / (United States) Wilmer Allison 6–3, 6–3

| Preceded by 1931 Wimbledon Championships | Grand Slams | Succeeded by 1932 Australian Championships |
