= 1930 U.S. National Championships (tennis) =

- Date: September 6–13 (M); August 18–23 (W)
- Edition: 50th
- Category: Grand Slam (ITF)
- Surface: Grass / Outdoor
- Location: Forest Hills, Queens; New York City, New York
- Venue: West Side Tennis Club

Champions

Men's singles
- (United States) John Doeg

Women's singles
- (United Kingdom) Betty Nuthall

Men's doubles
- (United States) George Lott / (United States) John Doeg

Women's doubles
- (United Kingdom) Betty Nuthall / (United States) Sarah Palfrey

Mixed doubles
- (United States) Edith Cross / (United States) Wilmer Allison
← 1929 ·	U.S. National Championships	· 1931 →

The 1930 U.S. National Championships (now known as the US Open) was a tennis tournament that took place on the outdoor grass courts at the West Side Tennis Club, Forest Hills in New York City, New York. The tournament ran from August 28 until September 13. It was the 50th staging of the U.S. National Championships and the fourth Grand Slam tennis event of the year.

== Finals ==
=== Men's singles ===
(United States) John Doeg defeated (United States) Frank Shields 10–8, 1–6, 6–4, 16–14

=== Women's singles ===
(United Kingdom) Betty Nuthall defeated (United States) Anna McCune Harper 6–1, 6–4

=== Men's doubles ===
(United States) George Lott / (United States) John Doeg defeated (United States) Wilmer Allison / (United States) John Van Ryn 8–6, 6–3, 4–6, 13–15, 6–4

=== Women's doubles ===
(United Kingdom) Betty Nuthall / (United States) Sarah Palfrey defeated (United States) Edith Cross / (United States) Anna McCune Harper 3–6, 6–3, 7–5

=== Mixed doubles ===
(United States) Edith Cross / (United States) Wilmer Allison defeated (United States) Marjorie Morrill / (United States) Frank Shields 6–4, 6–4

Preceded by 1930 Wimbledon Championships	Grand Slams	Succeeded by 1931 Australian Championships
