= 1929 U.S. National Championships (tennis) =

- Date: September 7 – 14 (M); August 19 – 24 (W)
- Edition: 49th
- Category: Grand Slam (ITF)
- Surface: Grass
- Location: Forest Hills, Queens; New York City, New York
- Venue: West Side Tennis Club

Champions

Men's singles
- (United States) Bill Tilden

Women's singles
- (United States) Helen Wills

Men's doubles
- (United States) George Lott / (United States) John Doeg

Women's doubles
- (United Kingdom) Phoebe Holcroft Watson / (United Kingdom) Peggy Michell

Mixed doubles
- (United Kingdom) Betty Nuthall / (United States) George Lott
← 1928 ·	U.S. National Championships	· 1930 →

The 1929 U.S. National Championships (now known as the US Open) was a tennis tournament that took place on the outdoor grass courts at the West Side Tennis Club, Forest Hills in New York City, New York. The men's tournament ran from September 7 until September 14, while the women's event took place from August 19 to August 24. It was the 49th staging of the U.S. National Championships and the fourth Grand Slam tennis event of the year. In the men's singles competition Bill Tilden won his record seventh and final singles title.

== Champions ==
=== Men's singles ===
(United States) Bill Tilden defeated (United States) Francis Hunter 3–6, 6–3, 4–6, 6–2, 6–4

=== Women's singles ===
(United States) Helen Wills defeated (United Kingdom) Phoebe Holcroft Watson 6–4, 6–2

=== Men's doubles ===
(United States) George Lott / (United States) John Doeg defeated (United States) Berkeley Bell / (United States) Lewis White 10–8, 16–14, 6–1

=== Women's doubles ===
(United Kingdom) Phoebe Holcroft Watson / (United Kingdom) Peggy Michell defeated (United Kingdom) Phyllis Covell / (United Kingdom) Dorothy Shepherd-Barron 2–6, 6–3, 6–4

=== Mixed doubles ===
(United Kingdom) Betty Nuthall / (United States) George Lott defeated (United Kingdom) Phyllis Covell / (United Kingdom) Bunny Austin 6–3, 6–3

Preceded by 1929 Wimbledon Championships	Grand Slams	Succeeded by 1930 Australian Championships
