= 1929 Wightman Cup =

International women's tennis competition

Details
- Edition: 7th

Champion
- Winning nation: United States

The 1929 Wightman Cup was the seventh edition of the annual women's team tennis competition between the United States and Great Britain. It was held on August 8 and 9, 1929 at the West Side Tennis Club in Forest Hills, Queens in New York City, NY in the United States. The U.S. team regained the cup.

United States
4
West Side Tennis Club, Forest Hills, New York City, United States
8–9 August 1929
Grass

Great Britain
3

			1	2	3
1	(United States) (United Kingdom)	Helen Wills; Phoebe Holcroft Watson	6; 1	6; 4
2	(United States) (United Kingdom)	Helen Jacobs; Betty Nuthall	6; 4	6; 2
3	(United States) (United Kingdom)	Helen Jacobs; Phoebe Holcroft Watson	3; 6	2; 6
4	(United States) (United Kingdom)	Edith Cross; Peggy Michell	6; 3	3; 6	6; 3
5	(United States) (United Kingdom)	Helen Wills; Betty Nuthall	8; 6	8; 6
6	(United States) (United Kingdom)	Helen Wills / Edith Cross; Phoebe Holcroft Watson / Peggy Michell	4; 6	1; 6
7	(United States) (United Kingdom)	Helen Jacobs / Hazel Hotchkiss Wightman; Phyllis Howkins Covell / Dorothy Shepherd Barron	2; 6	1; 6

== See also ==
- 1929 Davis Cup
