= Dorothy Weisel Hack =

American tennis player

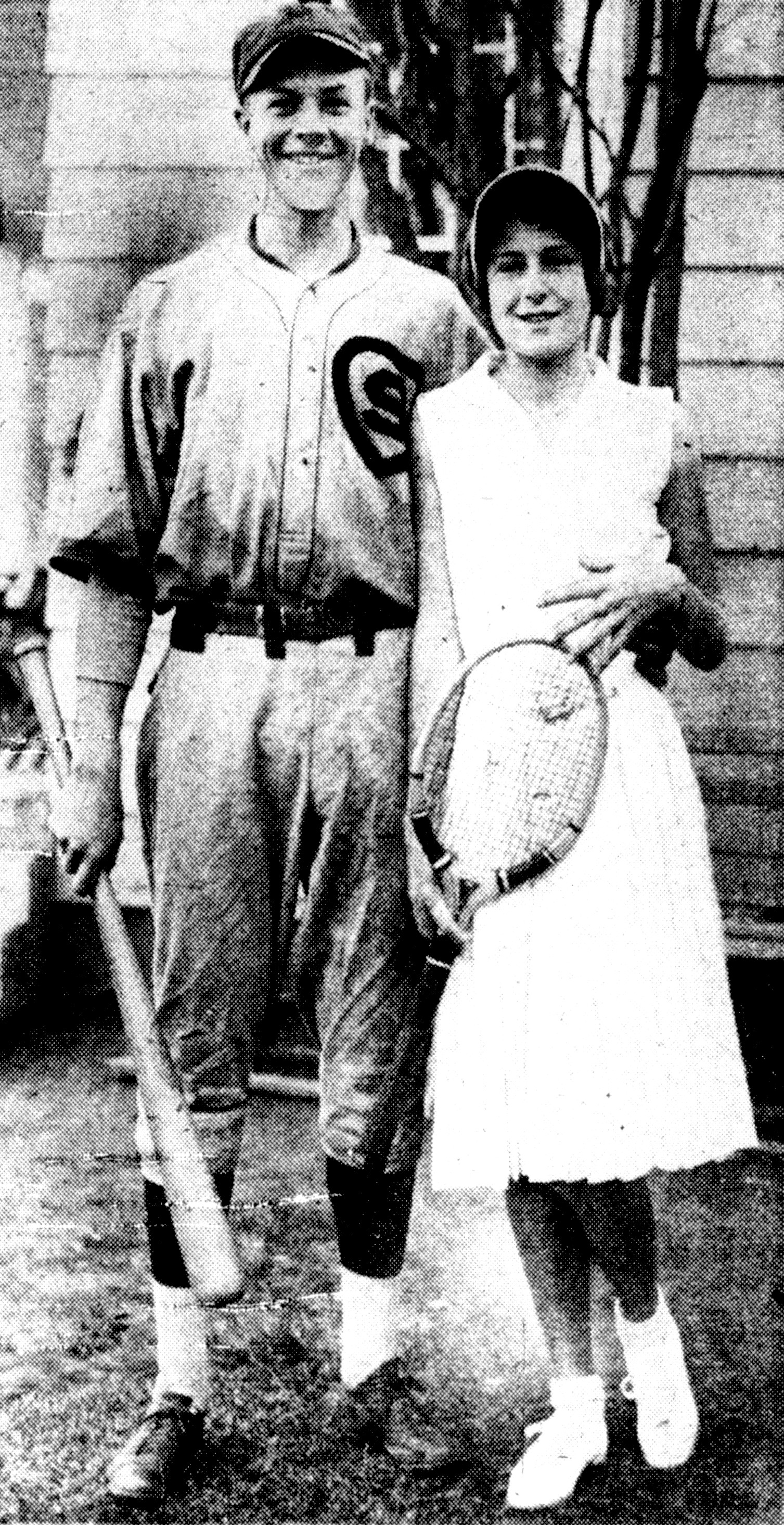
- Weisel Hack with her husband, Stan Hack, circa 1932
- Born: March 7, 1910; Sacramento, California, U.S.
- Died: June 17, 1963; Sacramento, California, U.S.
- Occupation: Tennis player

Dorothy Alice Weisel Hack (March 7, 1910 – June 17, 1963) was an amateur American tennis player in the 1920s and 1930s. She was ranked as high as No. 3 in the U.S. rankings during her career.

== Career ==
Dorothy Weisel was from Sacramento, California, the daughter of Theodore Jasper Weisel and Ethel D. Weisel. She won the Oregon state singles title in 1929. In the same tournament, she was paired with Golda Gross and reached the doubles final. She was California state women's tennis champion in 1930, and a two-time singles quarterfinalist (1930 and 1931) at the U.S. Nationals. In 1930, she beat fourth-seeded Sarah Palfrey Cooke en route to the quarters where she lost to Betty Nuthall. She reached the final of the California state tournament in 1931, but lost to Alice Marble. Also in 1931, she lost to Helen Wills Moody in the semifinals of a tournament at the Essex Country Club in Manchester-by-the-Sea. Hack won the Western Indoor championships in 1932. In the same year, at the tournament in Cincinnati, she won the singles title over Clara Louise Zinke, and was a doubles finalist with Helen Fulton. However, this pair were defeated in the finals match by Zinke and Ruth Oexman.

== Personal life ==
In 1932, Hack married fellow Sacramento native Stan Hack, a former third baseman and manager of the Chicago Cubs. They had a son, Stanley Jr. Hack died in 1963, at the age of 53, in Sacramento.
