= 1928 U.S. National Championships – Women's singles =

Tennis tournament

Women's singles
- 1928 U.S. National Championships

Final
- Champion: (United States) Helen Wills
- Runner-up: (United States) Helen Jacobs
- Score: 6–2, 6–1

Events
Singles	men	women
Doubles	men	women
← 1927 ·	U.S. National Championships	· 1929 →

First-seeded Helen Wills defeated Helen Jacobs 6–2, 6–1 in the final to win the women's singles tennis title at the 1928 U.S. National Championships. The event was held at the West Side Tennis Club, Forest Hills, New York City. It was Wills's fifth U.S. National singles title and her second in a row. Wills won the tournament without losing a set.

== Seeds ==
The tournament assigned eight seeded players for the women's singles event. Helen Wills is the champion; others show in brackets the round in which they were eliminated.

1. (United States) Helen Wills (champion)
2. (United States) Molla Mallory (semifinals)
3. (United States) Helen Jacobs (finalist)
4. (United States) Edith Cross (semifinals)
5. (United States) Charlotte Hosmer Chapin (quarterfinals)
6. (United States) Marjorie Morrill (quarterfinals)
7. (United States) Penelope Anderson (quarterfinals)
8. (United States) May Sutton Bundy (third round)

== Draw ==
=== Final eight ===
Quarterfinals
1	(United States) Helen Wills	6	6
5	(United States) Charlotte Hosmer Chapin	2	4
(United States) Hazel Hotchkiss Wightman	3	4
4	(United States) Edith Cross	6	6
3	(United States) Helen Jacobs	6	6
5	(United States) Penelope Anderson	4	1
6	(United States) Marjorie Morrill	2	6	3
2	(United States) Molla Mallory	6	3	6

Semifinals
1	(United States) Helen Wills	6	6
4	(United States) Edith Cross	0	1
3	(United States) Helen Jacobs	6	7
2	(United States) Molla Mallory	2	5

Finals
1	(United States) Helen Wills	6	6
3	(United States) Helen Jacobs	2	1

Preceded by 1928 Wimbledon Championships – Women's singles	Grand Slam women's singles	Succeeded by 1929 Australian Championships – Women's singles
