= Maud Rosenbaum =

American track and field athlete and tennis player

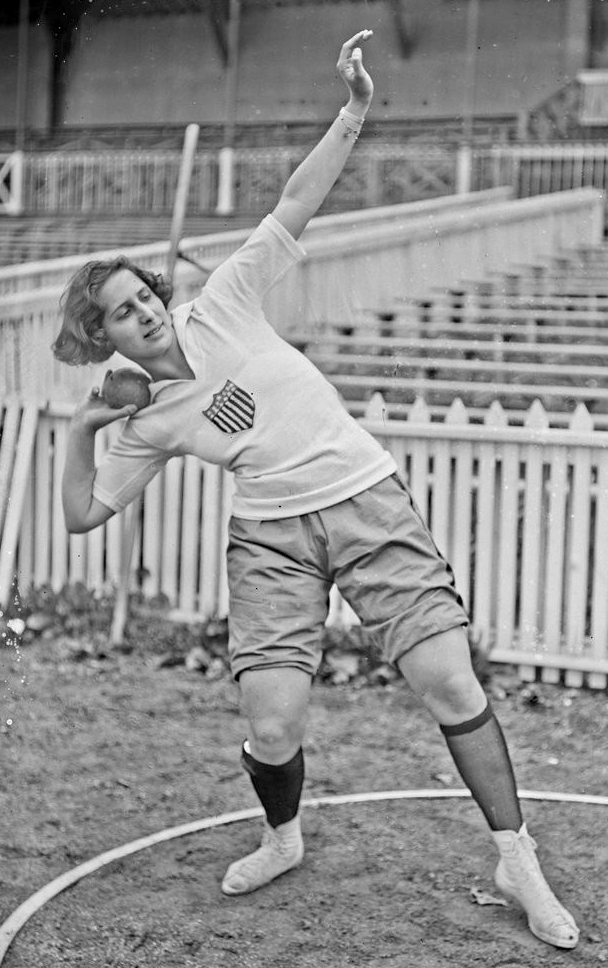
- Rosenbaum at the 1922 Women's World Games

Personal information
- Full name: Maud Levi Rosenbaum Blumenthal
- Born: January 13, 1902 Chicago, United States
- Died: May 3, 1981 (aged 79) New York City, United States

Sport
- Country: Italy
- Sport: Athletics, tennis
- Event: Shot put

Achievements and titles
- Personal best: SP – 8.97 m (1922)
Medal record
Representing Italy
Women's World Games
Bronze medal – third place	1922 Paris	Shot put

Maud Rosenbaum (January 13, 1902 – May 3, 1981) was an Italian-American track-and-field athlete and tennis player who won a bronze medal in the shot put at the 1922 Women's World Games. She was a naturalized Italian. Her name in her first marriage was Levi, and her name in her second marriage was Blumenthal.

== Biography ==
She was the daughter of Emmanual Rosenbaum, a wealthy shoe manufacturer. In 1927, she married Baron Giacomo Giorgio Levi in Paris and later moved to Rome; the couple had a daughter. In Italy, Baroness Levi became a prominent tennis player, and in 1930 she returned to the United States to compete in tennis. By 1933 she had won four tennis titles, including the New York State Tennis Championship. In 1934, she was ranked the seventh female player by the U.S. Lawn Tennis Association. She divorced Baron Levi in 1934, and in 1935 she married H. Walter Blumenthal, a New York stockbroker.
