= Sarah Palfrey Cooke =

American tennis player

Sarah Palfrey
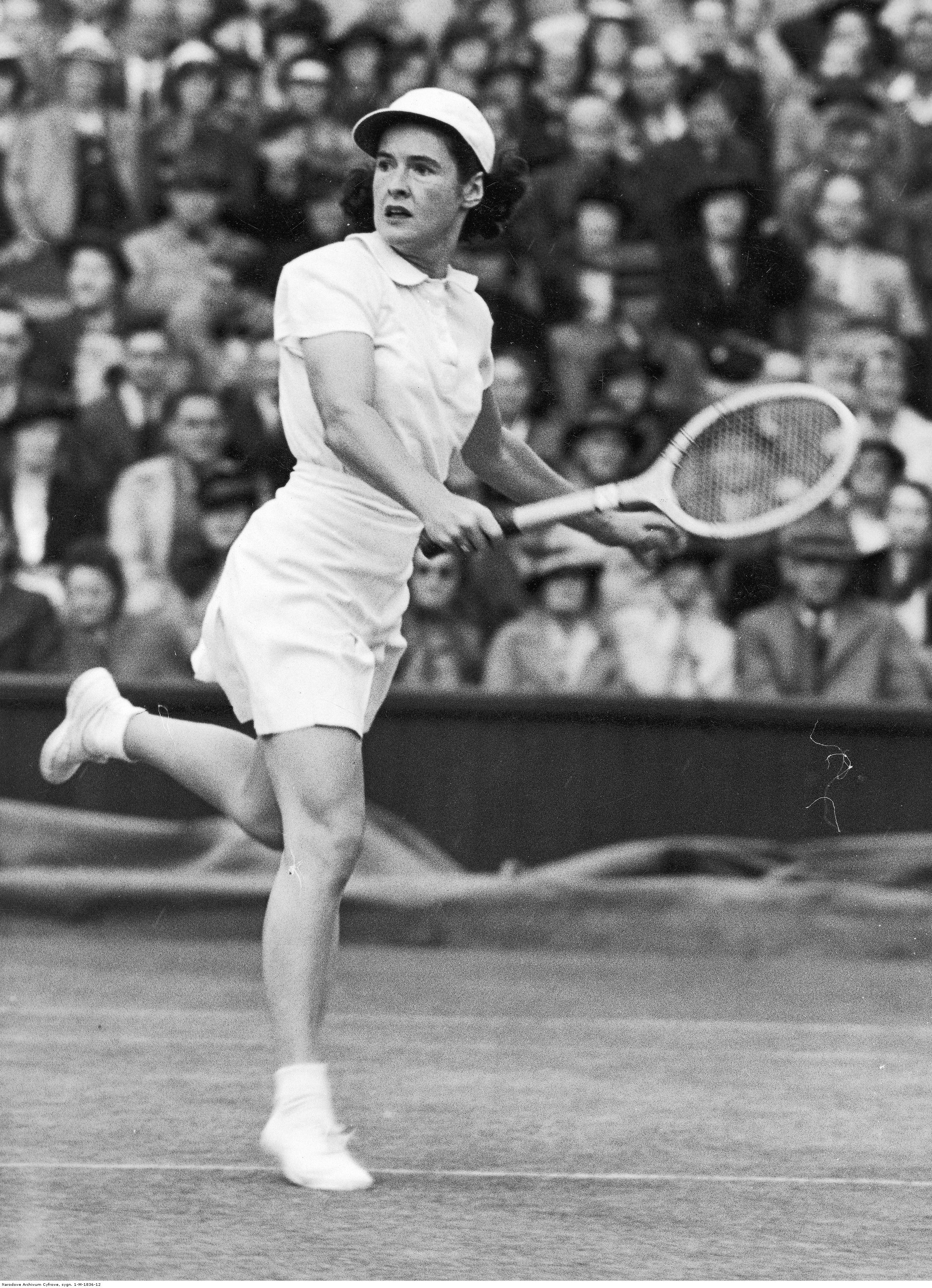
- Palfrey (then Fabyan) at Wimbledon in 1939
- Full name: Sarah Hammond Palfrey Danzig
- Country (sports): United States
- Born: September 18, 1912 Sharon, Massachusetts, US
- Died: February 27, 1996 (aged 83) New York City, US
- Height: 5 ft 4 in (1.63 m)
- Turned pro: 1947
- Plays: Right-handed
- Int. Tennis HoF: 1963 (member page)

Singles
- Career record: 419–116, 78.32%
- Career titles: 36
- Highest ranking: No. 4 (1934)

Grand Slam singles results
- French Open: QF (1939)
- Wimbledon: SF (1939)
- US Open: W (1941, 1945)

Grand Slam doubles results
- French Open: F (1934)
- Wimbledon: W (1938, 1939)
- US Open: W (1930, 1932, 1934, 1935, 1937, 1938, 1939, 1940, 1941)

Grand Slam mixed doubles results
- French Open: W (1939)
- Wimbledon: F (1936, 1938)
- US Open: W (1932, 1935, 1937, 1941)

Sarah Hammond Palfrey Danzig (née Palfrey; September 18, 1912 – February 27, 1996) was an American tennis player whose adult amateur career spanned 19 years, from June 1926 until September 1945. She won two singles, nine women's doubles, and four mixed doubles titles at the U.S. National Championships.

== Career ==
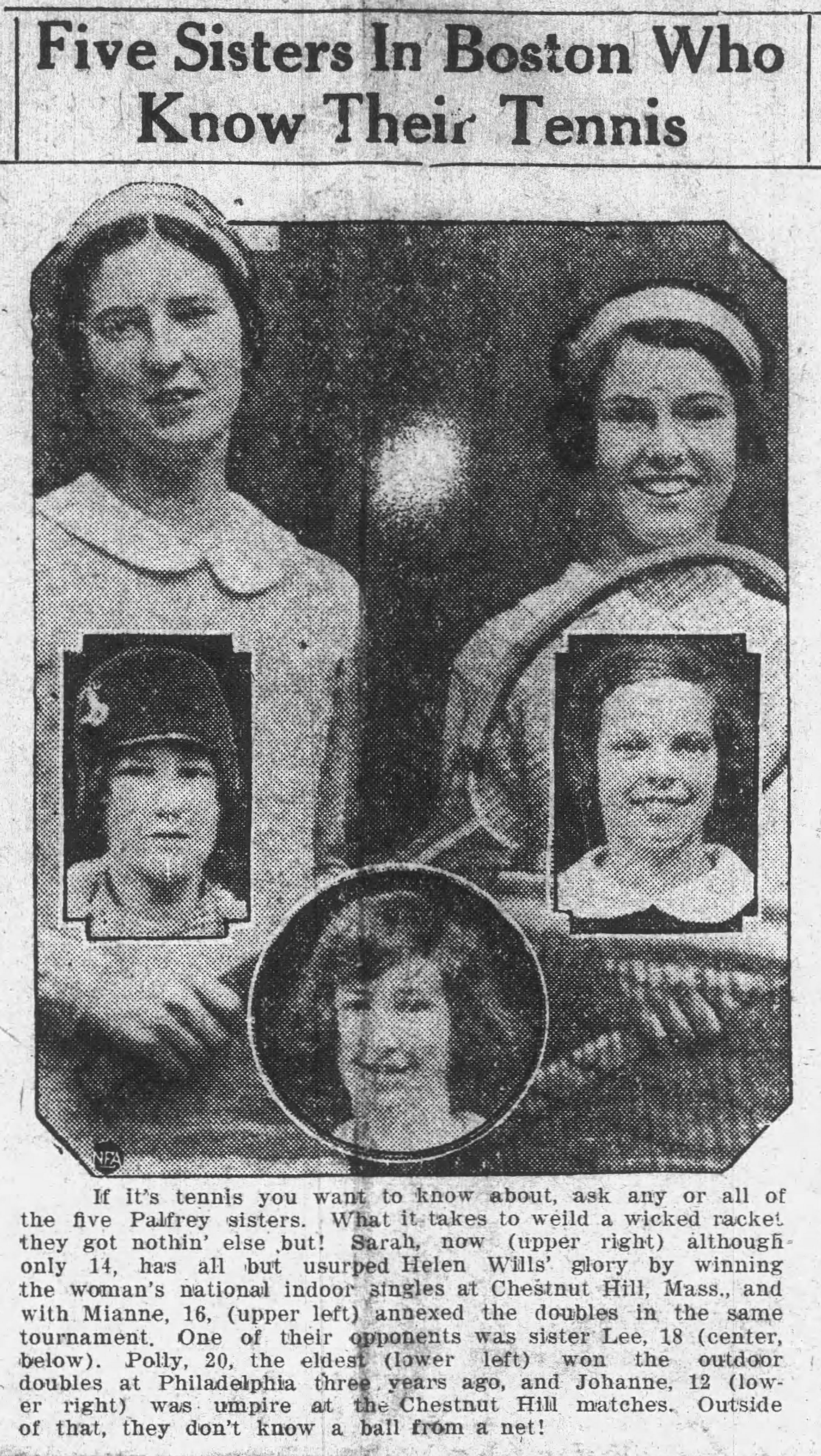
"Five Sisters in Boston Who Know Their Tennis" The Messenger (April 6, 1927); a newspaper feature about the Palfrey sisters

Palfrey and her siblings, including John Palfrey, Polly Palfrey Woodrow and Mianne Palfrey, competed in tennis at the national level.

She was 32 years old, married to Elwood Cooke, and a mother in 1945 when she won her second singles title at the U.S. National Championships. Pauline Betz was her opponent in the final. Since she lost to Cooke in the 1941 final, Betz had won three consecutive titles and 19 consecutive matches at these championships. In 1945, Cooke lost the first set and squandered her 5–2 lead in the second set before recovering to win it 8–6. In the third set, Betz got close to winning yet another title when she served for a 5–3 lead. Cooke, however, broke her serve and then won the next two games to win the tournament. She became only the second mother to win this title, with Hazel Hotchkiss Wightman being the first.

Cooke is one of the few women, if not the sole woman, to appear on a top-level male championship honor roll. Because of the manpower crisis during World War II, she and husband Elwood were permitted to enter the men's doubles at the 1945 Tri-State Championships in Cincinnati. They lost in the final to Hal Surface and Bill Talbert.

Palfrey won 16 Grand Slam championships in women's doubles (11) and mixed doubles (5). She teamed with Betty Nuthall to win the 1930 U.S. National Championships and with Helen Jacobs to win the 1932, 1934, and 1935 championships. Palfrey and Alice Marble won the U.S. National Championships from 1937 through 1940. At the Wimbledon Championships, Palfrey and Marble won the 1938 and 1939 women's doubles titles. Palfrey's last U.S. women's doubles championship was in 1941 with Margaret Osborne. In mixed doubles, Palfrey teamed with four different partners to win the U.S. National Championships: Fred Perry (1932), Enrique Maier (1935), Don Budge (1937), and Jack Kramer (1941). Palfrey also won the mixed doubles title at the 1939 French International Championships, teaming with future husband Elwood Cooke.

Palfrey and Marble were undefeated in doubles from 1937 until Marble turned professional at the end of 1940.

In 1947, Cooke and Betz went on a "barnstorming" tour of mostly one-night stands in the U.S. and Europe, with each earning about US$10,000. They had been stripped of their amateur status by the United States Lawn Tennis Association (USLTA) in early 1947 because Elwood Cooke had written letters to several tournament organizers about creating a professional tour.

According to A. Wallis Myers of The Daily Telegraph and John Olliff of the Daily Mail, Palfrey was one of the 10 highest ranked women in the world from 1933 through 1936 and in 1938 and 1939. Her career high was fourth in 1934. (No world rankings were issued from 1940 through 1945.)

Palfrey was included in 13 year-end top 10 rankings issued by the USLTA: 1929–1931, 1933–1941, and 1945. She was the top-ranked U.S. player in 1941 and 1945.

Palfrey and Marble lobbied the USLTA to remove the color bar and allow Althea Gibson to play at heretofore whites-only tournaments beginning in 1950. "She [Palfrey] was calmly persuasive, had clout as an ex-champ, and got Althea into the U.S. [National] Championships in 1950," said Gladys Heldman, founder of the women's professional tennis tour in 1970.

Palfrey once said "Tennis is the best game there is. It combines mental and physical qualities and is the sport for a lifetime. And there are many living examples at the age of 80 to prove it. So it is enough for us to know that tennis will remain, under whatever conditions, whether amateur or pro, the finest game there is for us, for our children, and our children's children."

Palfrey was inducted into the International Tennis Hall of Fame in 1963.

Palfrey and Marty Glickman covered the home games of the 1946-47 New York Knicks on WHN radio. Glickman handled play-by-play duties while Palfrey provided the color commentary. The New York Times stated "in what is said to be the first time that an outstanding woman sports figure has been assigned to such a chore, Sarah Palfrey Cooke, tennis champion, will provide the 'color' accounts of the games."

== Personal life ==
She had two children and was married three times: to Marshal Fabyan, Elwood Cooke, and Jerome Alan Danzig. She married Fabyan on October 6, 1934, but divorced him in Reno, Nevada on July 20, 1940. She married Cooke on October 2, 1940, and their daughter was born in December 1942. She divorced him on April 29, 1949, on grounds of cruelty. She married Danzig on April 27, 1951, and remained married to him until her death of lung cancer in 1996. Their son was born in December 1952.

Her brother John Palfrey, also an excellent tennis player and an expert on atomic energy, married Belle "Clochette" Roosevelt Palfrey, a granddaughter of Theodore Roosevelt and a daughter of Kermit Roosevelt.

She also had four sisters, Joanna, Lee, Mianne, and Polly, who were all tennis players.

She was a member of the Junior League of New York City, NY.

== Grand Slam finals ==
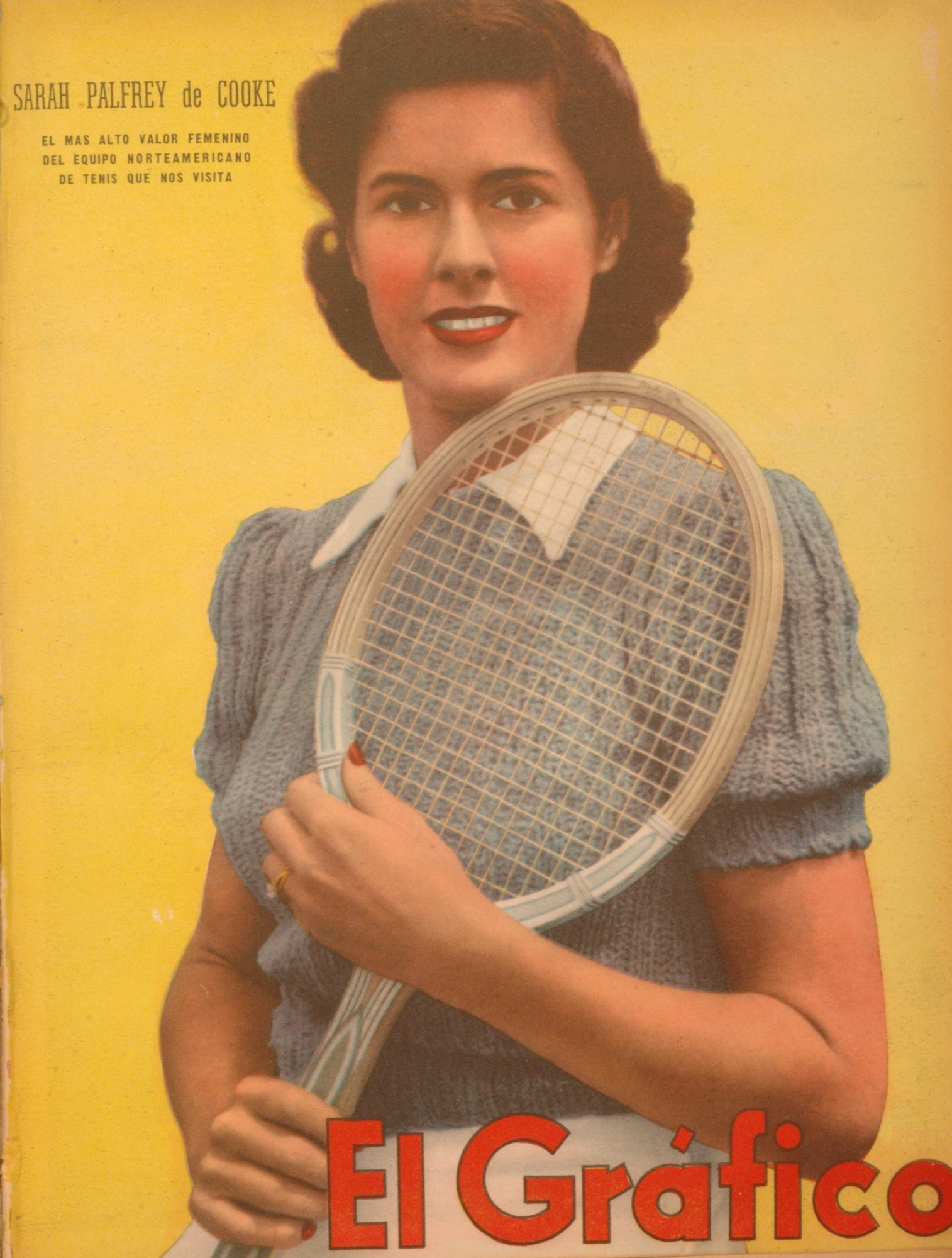
Sarah Palfrey on the cover of the Argentine magazine El Gráfico in 1940

=== Singles (2 titles, 2 runner-ups) ===
Result	Year	Championship	Surface	Opponent	Score
Loss	1934	U.S. National Championships	Grass	(United States) Helen Jacobs	1–6, 4–6
Loss	1935	U.S. National Championships	Grass	(United States) Helen Jacobs	2–6, 4–6
Win	1941	U.S. National Championships	Grass	(United States) Pauline Betz	7–5, 6–2
Win	1945	U.S. National Championships	Grass	(United States) Pauline Betz	3–6, 8–6, 6–4

=== Doubles (11 titles, 3 runner-ups) ===
Result	Year	Championship	Surface	Partner	Opponents	Score
Win	1930	U.S. National Championships	Grass	(United Kingdom) Betty Nuthall	(United States) Edith Cross (United States) Anna McCune Harper	3–6, 6–3, 7–5
Win	1932	U.S. National Championships	Grass	(United States) Helen Jacobs	(United States) Alice Marble (United States) Marjorie Morrill	8–6, 6–1
Loss	1934	French Championships	Clay	(United States) Helen Jacobs	(France) Simonne Mathieu (United States) Elizabeth Ryan	6–3, 4–6, 2–6
Win	1934	U.S. National Championships	Grass	(United States) Helen Jacobs	(United States) Carolin Babcock (United States) Dorothy Andrus	4–6, 6–3, 6–4
Win	1935	U.S. National Championships	Grass	(United States) Helen Jacobs	(United States) Carolin Babcock (United States) Dorothy Andrus	6–4, 6–2
Loss	1936	Wimbledon	Grass	(United States) Helen Jacobs	(United Kingdom) Kay Stammers (United Kingdom) Freda James	2–6, 1–6
Loss	1936	U.S. National Championships	Grass	(United States) Helen Jacobs	(United States) Marjorie Gladman Van Ryn (United States) Carolin Babcock	7–9, 6–2, 4–6
Win	1937	U.S. National Championships	Grass	(United States) Alice Marble	(United States) Marjorie Gladman Van Ryn (United States) Carolin Babcock	7–5, 6–4
Win	1938	Wimbledon	Grass	(United States) Alice Marble	(France) Simonne Mathieu (United Kingdom) Billie Yorke	6–2, 6–3
Win	1938	U.S. National Championships	Grass	(United States) Alice Marble	(France) Simonne Mathieu (Poland) Jadwiga Jędrzejowska	6–8, 6–4, 6–3
Win	1939	Wimbledon	Grass	(United States) Alice Marble	(United States) Helen Jacobs (United Kingdom) Billie Yorke	6–1, 6–0
Win	1939	U.S. National Championships	Grass	(United States) Alice Marble	(United Kingdom) Kay Stammers (United Kingdom) Freda James Hammersley	7–5, 8–6
Win	1940	U.S. National Championships	Grass	(United States) Alice Marble	(United States) Dorothy Bundy (United States) Marjorie Gladman Van Ryn	6–4, 6–3
Win	1941	U.S. National Championships	Grass	(United States) Margaret Osborne	(United States) Dorothy Bundy (United States) Pauline Betz	3–6, 6–1, 6–4

=== Mixed doubles (5 titles, 5 runner-ups) ===
Result	Year	Championship	Surface	Partner	Opponents	Score
Win	1932	U.S. National Championships	Grass	(United Kingdom) Fred Perry	(United States) Helen Jacobs (United States) Ellsworth Vines	6–3, 7–5
Loss	1933	U.S. National Championships	Grass	(United States) George Lott	(United States) Elizabeth Ryan (United States) Ellsworth Vines	9–11, 1–6
Win	1935	U.S. National Championships	Grass	(Spain) Enrique Maier	(United Kingdom) Kay Stammers (Czechoslovakia) Roderich Menzel	6–4, 4–6, 6–3
Loss	1936	Wimbledon	Grass	(United States) Don Budge	(United Kingdom) Dorothy Round (United Kingdom) Fred Perry	9–7, 5–7, 4–6
Loss	1936	U.S. National Championships	Grass	(United States) Don Budge	(United States) Alice Marble (United States) Gene Mako	3–6, 2–6
Win	1937	U.S. National Championships	Grass	(United States) Don Budge	(France) Sylvie Jung Henrotin (France) Yvon Petra	6–2, 8–10, 6–0
Loss	1938	Wimbledon	Grass	(Germany) Henner Henkel	(United States) Alice Marble (United States) Don Budge	1–6, 4–6
Win	1939	French Championships	Clay	(United States) Elwood Cooke	(France) Simonne Mathieu (Socialist Federal Republic of Yugoslavia) Franjo Kukuljević	4–6, 6–1, 7–5
Loss	1939	U.S. National Championships	Grass	(United States) Elwood Cooke	(United States) Alice Marble (Australia) Harry Hopman	7–9, 1–6
Win	1941	U.S. National Championships	Grass	(United States) Jack Kramer	(United States) Pauline Betz (United States) Bobby Riggs	4–6, 6–4, 6–4

== Grand Slam singles tournament timeline ==
Key
W	F	SF	QF	#R	RR	Q#	DNQ	A	NH

(W) winner; (F) finalist; (SF) semifinalist; (QF) quarterfinalist; (#R) rounds 4, 3, 2, 1; (RR) round-robin stage; (Q#) qualification round; (DNQ) did not qualify; (A) absent; (NH) not held; (SR) strike rate (events won / competed); (W–L) win–loss record.

Tournament	1928	1929	1930	1931	1932	1933	1934	1935	1936	1937	1938	1939	1940	1941	1942	1943	1944	1945	Career SR	Win–loss
Australian National Championships	A	A	A	A	A	A	A	A	A	A	A	A	A	NH	NH	NH	NH	NH	0 / 0	0–0
French Championships	A	A	A	A	A	A	3R	A	A	A	A	QF	NH	R	R	R	R	A	0 / 2	2–2
Wimbledon Championships	A	A	2R	A	4R	A	QF	A	2R	A	QF	SF	NH	NH	NH	NH	NH	NH	0 / 6	16–6
U.S. National Championships	1R	3R	3R	3R	2R	QF	F	F	1R	1R	SF	QF	3R	W	A	QF	A	W	2 / 16	40–14
SR	0 / 1	0 / 1	0 / 2	0 / 1	0 / 2	0 / 1	0 / 3	0 / 1	0 / 2	0 / 1	0 / 2	0 / 3	0 / 1	1 / 1	0 / 0	0 / 1	0 / 0	1 / 1	2 / 24	
Win–loss	0–1	2–1	3–2	2–1	2–2	3–1	10–3	5–1	0–2	0–1	8–2	9–3	2–1	5–0	0–0	2–1	0–0	5–0		58–22

R = tournament restricted to French nationals and held under German occupation.

== See also ==
- Performance timelines for all female tennis players since 1978 who reached at least one Grand Slam final
