= Wilmer Allison =

American tennis player (1904–1977)

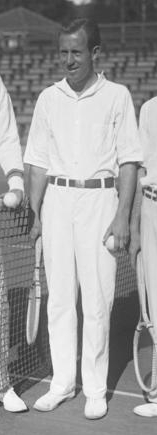
- Full name: Wilmer Lawson Allison Jr.
- Country (sports): United States
- Born: December 8, 1904 San Antonio, Texas, U.S.
- Died: April 20, 1977 (aged 72) Austin, Texas, U.S.
- Height: 1.80 m (5 ft 11 in)
- Turned pro: 1927 (amateur tour)
- Retired: 1941
- Plays: Right-handed (1-handed backhand)
- Int. Tennis HoF: 1963 (member page)

Singles
- Career record: 179-67
- Career titles: 28
- Highest ranking: No. 4 (1935, A. Wallis Myers)

Grand Slam singles results
- Australian Open: SF (1933)
- Wimbledon: F (1930)
- US Open: W (1935)

Doubles

Grand Slam doubles results
- Wimbledon: W (1929, 1930)
- US Open: W (1931, 1935)

Mixed doubles

Grand Slam mixed doubles results
- US Open: W (1930)

Wilmer Lawson Allison Jr. (December 8, 1904 – April 20, 1977) was an American amateur World No 4-ranked tennis champion of the 1930s. Allison was both a fine singles player and, along with his frequent partner, John Van Ryn, a great doubles player. He won the 1935 U.S. Championship in singles and was also ranked the US No. 1 in 1934 and 1935.

At the University of Texas at Austin, Allison was the Intercollegiate tennis champion in 1927. One of Allison's earliest tournament wins was the 1928 Canadian Championship, where he won the final over doubles partner Van Ryn.

== Career ==
Right-handed, Allison's greatest triumph was winning the 1935 U.S. Championship singles, defeating Fred Perry in the semifinals (Perry fell and suffered an injury during the match) and Sidney Wood in the finals, both in three sets. He had previously lost to Perry 8–6 in the fifth set in the 1934 finals. This would be his final appearance at the US Open tournament.

At the Wimbledon Championships his best results in singles came in 1930 when he finished runner-up to Bill Tilden, losing the final in straight sets. En route to the final he defeated reigning champion and first-seed Henri Cochet in straight sets in the quarterfinals.

In the 1928 Canadian Open held at the Toronto Lawn Tennis Club on red clay, Allison defeated Willard Crocker in four sets in the quarterfinal, John Doeg in four sets in the semifinal, and Van Ryn in the final in three straight sets.

In 1929, Allison won the Mason Dixon Championships at The Greenbrier resort defeating Frank Hunter in the final in five sets. He won the same title in 1935 defeating J. Gilbert Hall in the final.

In April 1932, Allison won the United North and South Championships at the Pinehurst Country Club defeating Ellsworth Vines in the final in a long five set match. He won the same tournament in 1935 defeating J. Gilbert Hall in the final in three straight sets.

He was ranked U.S. No. 1 in singles in 1934 and 1935 and World No. 4 in 1932 and again in 1935 by A. Wallis Myers of The Daily Telegraph.

Allison's last major tournament was a 1936 quarterfinal loss at Wimbledon to Bunny Austin. He did not defend his title at the US Open that year.

Allison was runner-up to Frank Parker at the 1938 Canadian Open Championships.

As a doubles player with partner John Van Ryn, Allison won the 1929 and 1930 Wimbledon and 1935 U.S. doubles championships.

=== Davis Cup ===
Allison played a total of 44 matches, 29 in doubles with Van Ryn, in Davis Cup for the United States, the third most of any player behind John McEnroe and Vic Seixas. He won 32 of those matches but never the cup.

=== Playing style ===
In his 1979 autobiography, Jack Kramer devotes a page to the best tennis strokes he had ever seen. He writes: "FOREHAND VOLLEY — Wilmer Allison of Texas, who won the 1935 Forest Hills, had the best I ever saw as a kid, and I've never seen anyone since hit one better. Budge Patty came closest, then Newcombe".

George Lott, who won five U.S. doubles titles as well as two at Wimbledon, wrote an article in the May 1973, issue of Tennis Magazine in which he ranked the great doubles teams and the great players. He called the team of Allison and Van Ryn the ninth best of all time.

Allison was a colonel in the United States Army Air Forces in World War II. He coached tennis for the varsity team of his alma mater from 1946 through 1972 and was head coach from 1957.

Allison was inducted into the International Tennis Hall of Fame in Newport, Rhode Island in 1963.

== Grand Slam finals ==
=== Singles (1 titles, 2 runners-up) ===
Result	Year	Championship	Surface	Opponent	Score
Loss	1930	Wimbledon	Grass	(United States) Bill Tilden	3–6, 7–9, 4–6
Loss	1934	U.S. National Championships	Grass	(United Kingdom) Fred Perry	4–6, 3–6, 6–3, 6–1, 6–8
Win	1935	U.S. National Championships	Grass	(United States) Sidney Wood	6–2, 6–2, 6–3

=== Doubles (4 titles, 5 runners-up) ===
Result	Year	Championship	Surface	Partner	Opponents	Score
Win	1929	Wimbledon	Grass	(United States) John Van Ryn	(United Kingdom) Ian Collins (United Kingdom) Colin Gregory	6–4, 5–7, 6–3, 10–12, 6–4
Win	1930	Wimbledon	Grass	(United States) John Van Ryn	(United States) John Doeg (United States) George Lott	6–3, 6–3, 6–2
Loss	1930	U.S. National Championships	Grass	(United States) John Van Ryn	(United States) John Doeg (United States) George Lott	6–8, 3–6, 6–3, 15–13, 4–6
Win	1931	U.S. National Championships	Grass	(United States) John Van Ryn	(United States) Berkeley Bell (United States) Gregory Mangin	6–4, 6–3, 6–2
Loss	1932	U.S. National Championships	Grass	(United States) John Van Ryn	(United States) Keith Gledhill (United States) Ellsworth Vines	4–6, 3–6, 2–6
Loss	1934	U.S. National Championships	Grass	(United States) John Van Ryn	(United States) George Lott (United States) Lester Stoefen	4–6, 7–9, 6–3, 4–6
Loss	1935	Wimbledon	Grass	(United States) John Van Ryn	(Australia) Jack Crawford (Australia) Adrian Quist	3–6, 7–5, 2–6, 7–5, 5–7
Win	1935	U.S. National Championships	Grass	(United States) John Van Ryn	(United States) Don Budge (United States) Gene Mako	6–2, 6–3, 2–6, 3–6, 6–1
Loss	1936	U.S. National Championships	Grass	(United States) John Van Ryn	(United States) Don Budge (United States) Gene Mako	4–6, 2–6, 4–6

=== Mixed doubles (1 title, 1 runner-up) ===
Result	Year	Championship	Surface	Partner	Opponents	Score
Win	1930	U.S. National Championships	Grass	(United States) Edith Cross	(United States) Marjorie Morrill (United States) Frank Shields	6–4, 6–4
Loss	1931	U.S. National Championships	Grass	(United States) Anna McCune Harper	(United Kingdom) Betty Nuthall (United States) George Lott	3–6, 3–6
