= Edith Cross =

American tennis player

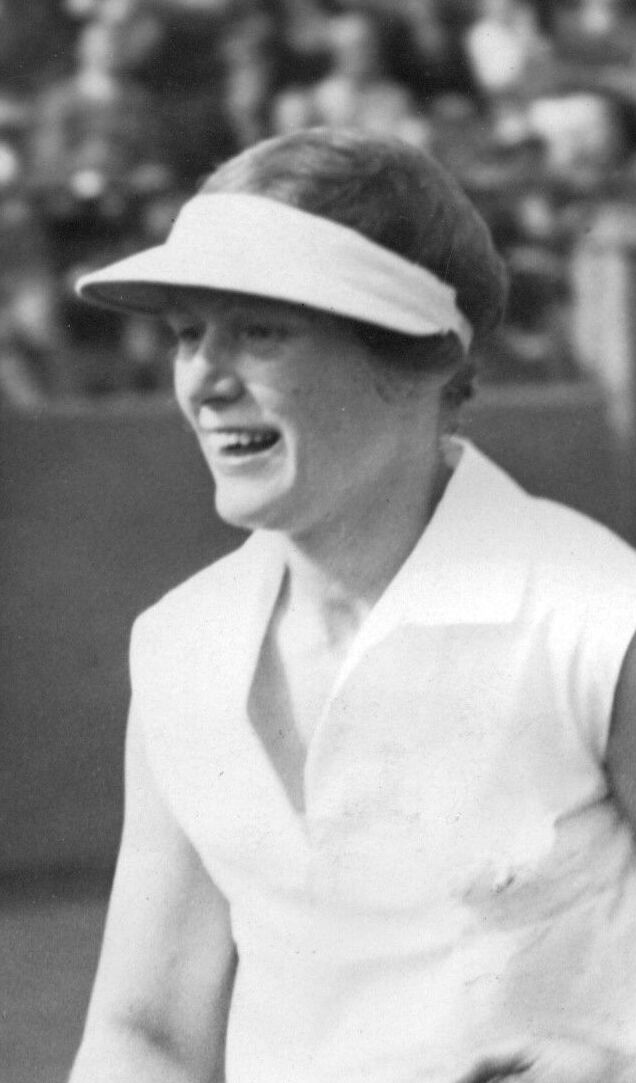
- Edith Cross (1929)
- Full name: Edith Ann Cross Jensen
- Country (sports): United States
- Born: August 2, 1907 San Francisco, U.S.
- Died: July 15, 1983 (aged 75) San Mateo, California, U.S.

Singles

Grand Slam singles results
- French Open: 2R (1929)
- Wimbledon: 1R (1929, 1930)
- US Open: SF (1928)

Doubles

Grand Slam doubles results
- Wimbledon: F (1930)
- US Open: F (1928, 1930)

Mixed doubles

Grand Slam mixed doubles results
- Wimbledon: QF (1930)
- US Open: W (1930)

Edith Cross Jensen (née Cross; August 2, 1907 – July 15, 1983) was an American tennis player who achieved a No. 3 national ranking in 1928, 1929 and 1930.

== Career ==
Cross, originally from San Francisco, began to play tennis after graduating from high school in 1927. In 1930, she won the U.S. National Championships mixed doubles title with Wilmer Allison after a straight-sets victory in the final against Marjorie Morrill and Frank Shields. She reached the U.S. National Championships doubles final in 1928 and 1930 with Anna Harper. In 1930, she reached the final of the doubles event at Wimbledon with Sarah Palfrey, losing to Helen Wills and Elizabeth Ryan in straight sets.

In 1928 and 1931, she won the singles title at the Pacific Coast Championships. In 1931, she won the singles title at the Canadian Championships, defeating Marjory Leeming in straight sets.

She was part of the American team that won the Wightman Cup against Great Britain 1929. Cross won her singles match against Peggy Michell, but lost her doubles match with Helen Wills against Phoebe Holcroft Watson and Peggy Michell.

In 1976, she was inducted into the USTA Northern California Tennis Hall of Fame.

== Grand Slam finals ==
=== Doubles (3 runners-up) ===
Result	Year	Championship	Surface	Partner	Opponents	Score
Loss	1928	U.S. Championships	Grass	(United States) Anna McCune Harper	(United States) Hazel Hotchkiss Wightman (United States) Helen Wills	2–6, 2–6
Loss	1930	Wimbledon	Grass	(United States) Sarah Palfrey	(United States) Helen Wills (United States) Elizabeth Ryan	2–6, 7–9
Loss	1930	U.S. Championships	Grass	(United States) Anna McCune Harper	(United States) Betty Nuthall (United States) Sarah Palfrey	6–3, 3–6, 5–7

=== Mixed doubles (1 title, 1 runner-up) ===
Result	Year	Championship	Surface	Partner	Opponents	Score
Loss	1928	U.S. Championships	Grass	(Australia) Gar Moon	(United States) Helen Wills (Australia) Jack Hawkes	1–6, 3–6
Win	1930	U.S. Championships	Grass	(United States) Wilmer Allison	(United States) Marjorie Morrill (United States) Frank Shields	6–4, 6–4
