= Anna McCune Harper =

American tennis player (1902–1999)

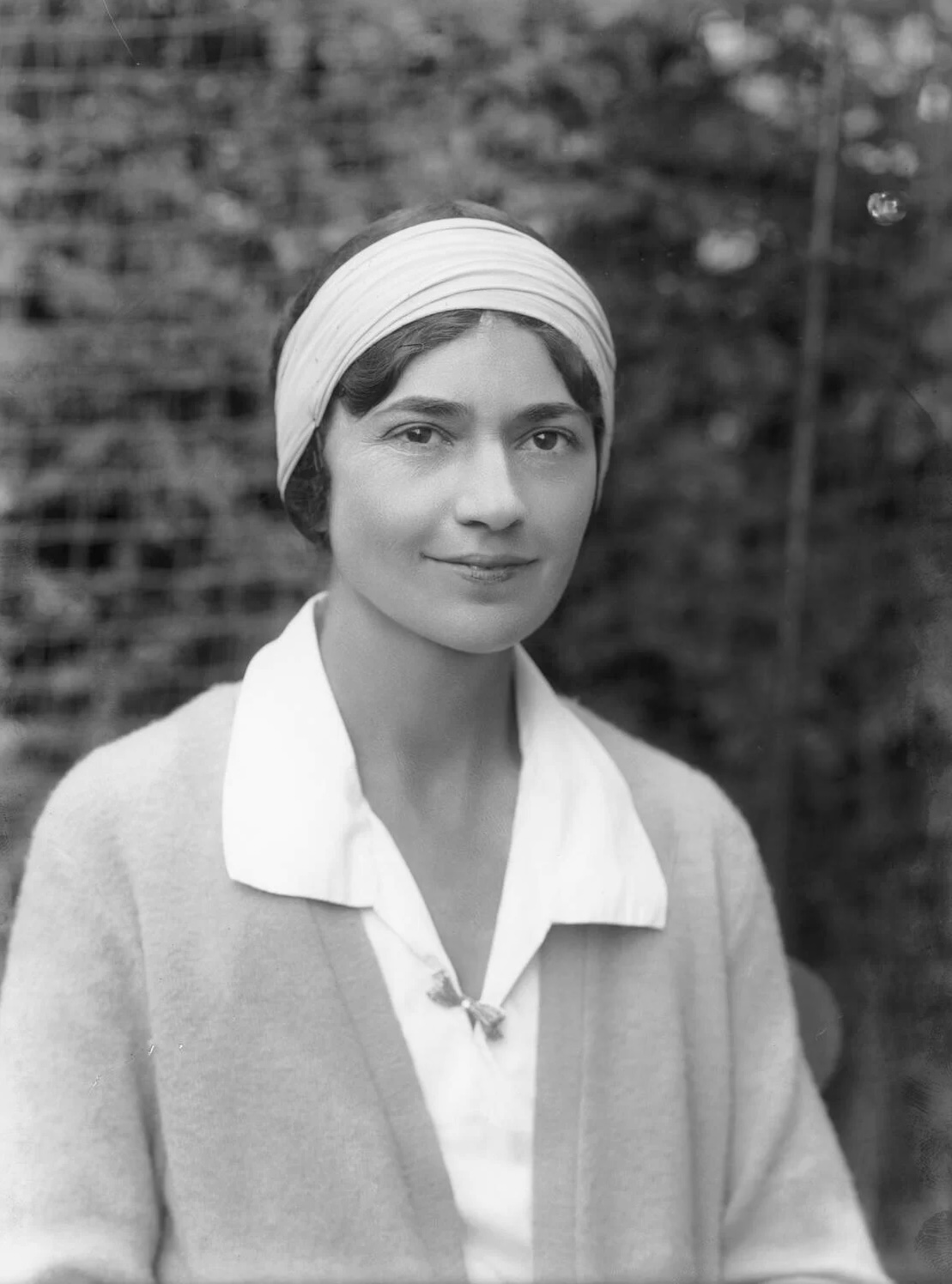
- Harper in 1931
- Full name: Anna Virginia McCune Harper
- Country (sports): United States
- Born: Anna Virginia McCune; July 2, 1902 Santa Barbara, California, U.S.
- Died: June 14, 1999 (aged 96) Moraga, California, U.S.
- Retired: 1932
- Plays: Left-handed

Singles

Grand Slam singles results
- Wimbledon: 4R (1931)
- US Open: F (1930)

Doubles

Grand Slam doubles results
- US Open: F (1928, 1930)

Grand Slam mixed doubles results
- Wimbledon: W (1931)
- US Open: F (1931)

Team competitions
- Wightman Cup: W (1931, 1932)

Anna McCune Harper (née Anna Virginia McCune, July 2, 1902 – June 14, 1999) was a female tennis player from the U.S. She won the mixed doubles title at Wimbledon in 1931 partnering George Lott. She was the runner-up in singles at the 1930 U.S. Championships, losing to Betty Nuthall. She also was the runner-up in women's doubles at the 1928, 1930, and 1932 U.S. Championships and in mixed doubles at the 1931 edition of these championships.

Harper was ranked in the U.S. top 10 on five consecutive years from 1928 through 1932 and was top ranked in 1930.

== Biography ==
In 1924, she graduated Phi Beta Kappa from the University of California, Berkeley, where she joined the sorority Sigma Kappa. In 1925, she married Lawrence Averell Harper, a history professor at Berkeley. Through the following years, she ranked in the U.S. top 10 players, including 1930 when she ranked at the best player.

In 1932, Harper was called home because of an illness in her family. She gave up tournament tennis for other tasks, including raising her three children, but continued to follow the game and played for many years.

Harper served as the national president of her sorority Sigma Kappa from 1939 to 1942.

Harper was inducted into the Cal Athletic Hall of Fame in 1981.

Around 1983, she had arthroscopic knee surgery at age 81 so she could continue to play. An adverse reaction to a general anesthetic sidelined her for good and then precipitated a slow decline in her health. Harper is buried in Mountain View Cemetery in Oakland, California.

== Grand Slam finals ==
=== Singles : 1 runner-up ===
Result	Year	Championship	Surface	Opponent	Score
Loss	1930	U.S. Championships	Grass	(United Kingdom) Betty Nuthall	1–6, 4–6

=== Doubles : 2 runners-up ===
Result	Year	Championship	Surface	Partner	Opponents	Score
Loss	1928	U.S. Championships	Grass	(United States) Edith Cross	(United States) Hazel Hotchkiss Wightman (United States) Helen Wills	2–6, 2–6
Loss	1930	U.S. Championships	Grass	(United States) Edith Cross	(United Kingdom) Betty Nuthall (United States) Sarah Palfrey Cooke	6–3, 3–6, 5–7

=== Mixed doubles : 1 title, 1 runner-up ===
Result	Year	Championship	Surface	Partner	Opponents	Score
Win	1931	Wimbledon	Grass	(United States) George Lott	(United Kingdom) Joan Ridley (United Kingdom) Ian Collins	6–3, 1–6, 6–1
Loss	1931	U.S. Championships	Grass	(United States) Wilmer Allison	(United Kingdom) Betty Nuthall (United States) George Lott	3–6, 3–6

== Grand Slam singles tournament timeline ==
Key
W	F	SF	QF	#R	RR	Q#	DNQ	A	NH

(W) winner; (F) finalist; (SF) semifinalist; (QF) quarterfinalist; (#R) rounds 4, 3, 2, 1; (RR) round-robin stage; (Q#) qualification round; (DNQ) did not qualify; (A) absent; (NH) not held; (SR) strike rate (events won / competed); (W–L) win–loss record.

Tournament	1925	1926	1927	1928	1929	1930	1931	1932	Career SR
Australian Championships	A	A	A	A	A	A	A	A	0 / 0
French Championships	A	A	A	A	A	A	A	A	0 / 0
Wimbledon	3R	1R	A	A	A	A	4R	1R	0 / 4
U.S. Championships	A	A	A	3R	3R	F	QF	QF	0 / 5
SR	0 / 1	0 / 1	0 / 0	0 / 1	0 / 1	0 / 1	0 / 2	0 / 2	0 / 9

== See also ==
- Performance timelines for all female tennis players since 1978 who reached at least one Grand Slam final
