= Marjorie Morrill =

American tennis player (1908–2009)

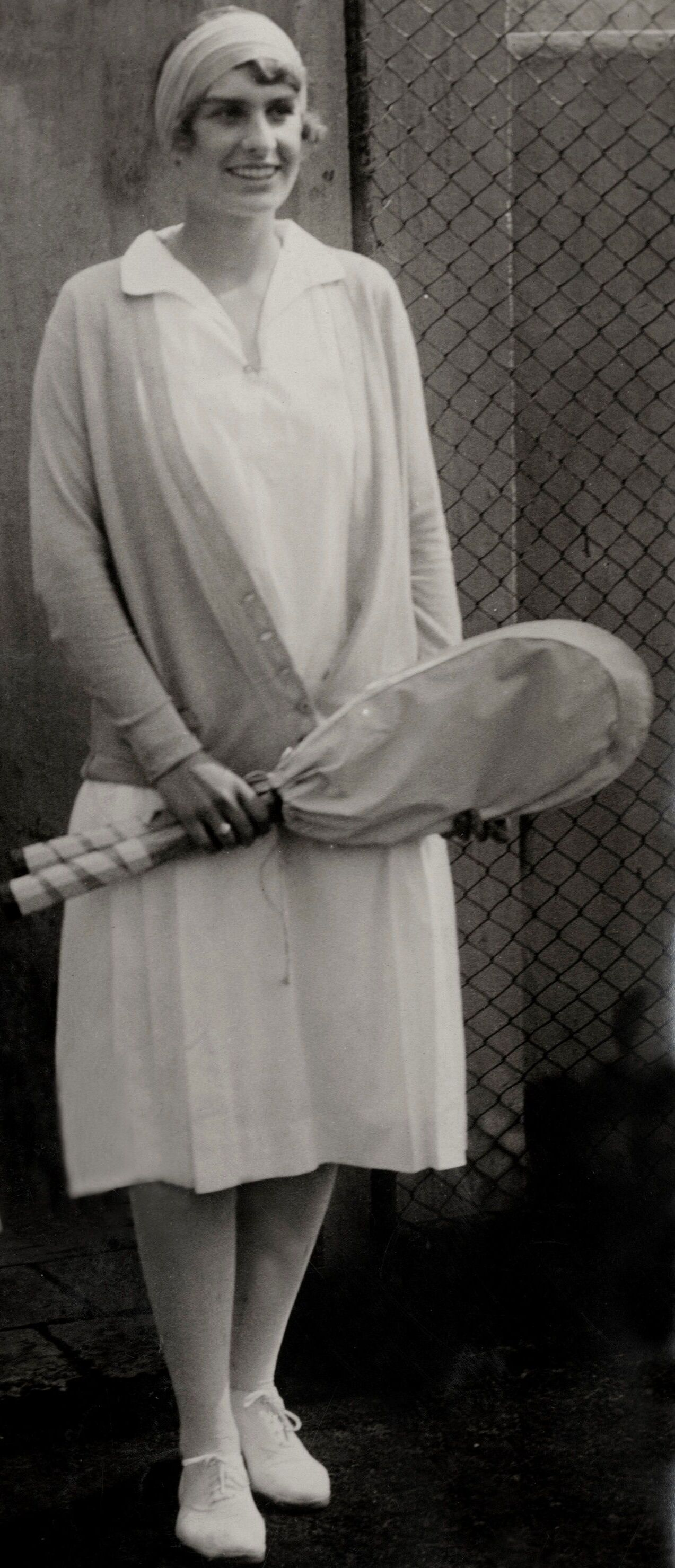
- Full name: Marjorie Adele Morrill Painter Whiting
- Country (sports): United States
- Born: March 29, 1908 Menton, France
- Died: November 27, 2009 (aged 101) Bedford, Massachusetts, U.S.

Singles

Grand Slam singles results
- Wimbledon: 3R (1929)
- US Open: SF (1930)

Doubles

Grand Slam doubles results
- Wimbledon: 3R (1929)
- US Open: F (1932)

Mixed doubles

Grand Slam mixed doubles results
- Wimbledon: 2R (1929)
- US Open: F (1930)

Marjorie Morrill Painter Whiting (née Morrill; March 29, 1908 – November 27, 2009), known during her tennis career as Marjorie 'Midge' Morrill, was an American female tennis player who was ranked No. 2 in the United States in 1930. From 1928 to 1934, she was ranked in the top 10 four times.

== Personal life ==
Morrill was the daughter of Joseph Morrill, a Boston lawyer, and Olive Morison Morrill, and lived on Glenridge Road in Dedham, Massachusetts. Joseph Morrill gave land to the Dedham Tennis Club to build courts on the same street. Marjorie Morrill was known to "spend hours every day hitting the ball against the backboard there."

Morrill was married to Whitfield Painter for 42 years and had three children with him: Nancy, Margot, and Whitfield, Jr. The Painter family moved frequently around the U.S. to accommodate Mr. Painter's sales job with Plymouth Cordage. After the elder Whitfield's death, she married John Whiting, who predeceased her after seven years of marriage. Morrill died on November 27, 2009, at age 101 at the Carleton Willard Skilled Nursing Facility.

== Tennis career ==
Morrill played singles, doubles, and mixed doubles. In 1930 at the U.S. National Championships, Morrill played in the mixed doubles final, where she and partner Frank Shields lost to Edith Cross and Wilmer Allison.

At the 1932 national indoor championships at Longwood in Brookline, Massachusetts, she swept the finals of the three women's events. Morrill also played at Wimbledon in 1929 in singles, doubles, and mixed doubles. She reached the third round in the singles and doubles events.

== Grand Slam finals ==
=== Doubles (1 runner-up) ===
Result	Year	Championship	Surface	Partner	Opponents	Score
Loss	1932	U.S. Championships	Grass	(United States) Alice Marble	(United States) Helen Jacobs (United States) Sarah Palfrey	6–8, 1–6

=== Mixed doubles (1 runner-up) ===
Result	Year	Championship	Surface	Partner	Opponents	Score
Loss	1930	U.S. Championships	Grass	(United States) Frank Shields	(United States) Edith Cross (United States) Wilmer Allison	4–6, 4–6
