= The Four Musketeers (tennis) =

Group of French tennis players in the 1920s

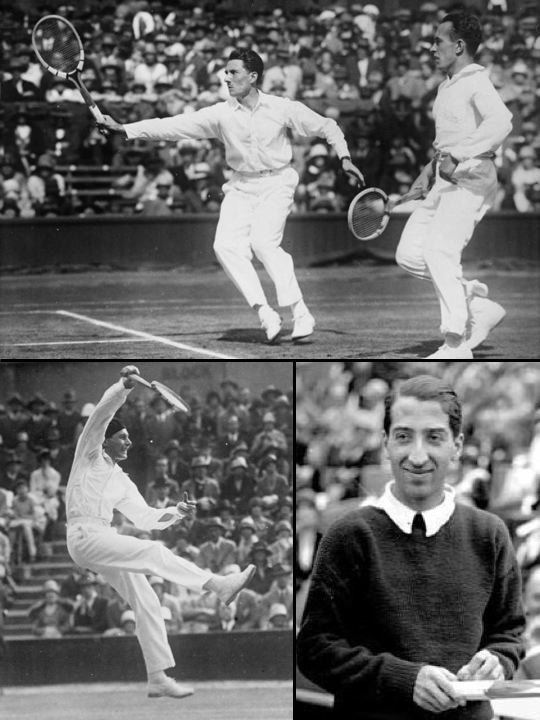
Jacques Brugnon and Henri Cochet together in doubles in 1930 (top), Jean Borotra, « le Basque bondissant » (the bounding Basque), in 1931 (below-left), René Lacoste in 1929 (below-right).

The Four Musketeers, (French: Les Quatre Mousquetaires) named after a 1921 film adaptation of Alexandre Dumas' novel, were French tennis players who were top competitors of the game during the second half of the 1920s and early 1930s, winning 18 Grand Slam singles titles and 13 Grand Slam doubles. They also led France to six straight Davis Cup wins, 1927–32, in an era when Cup matches enjoyed a prestige similar to today's FIFA World Cup finals. At its creation in 1927, the men's French Open trophy was named the Coupe des Mousquetaires in honour of the quartet.

== The Musketeers ==
The Four Musketeers were:

- Jean Borotra (1898–1994)
- Jacques Brugnon (1895–1978)
- Henri Cochet (1901–1987)
- René Lacoste (1904–1996)

While Brugnon was primarily a doubles specialist, Borotra, Cochet, and Lacoste won many singles titles. Among them, they won three United States Championships at Forest Hills, six consecutive Wimbledon titles from 1924 through 1929, and 10 titles in 11 years at the French Championships from 1922 through 1932 (up to and including 1924, though, the tournament was only open to members of French tennis clubs, therefore wasn't a major tournament until 1925). From 1926 until 1930, either Lacoste or Cochet was ranked No. 1 in the world, and in 1926 and 1927 all four musketeers were ranked in the top-10. The only player capable of challenging their dominance was the American Bill Tilden (world number-one from 1920 until 1926, when Lacoste took over the position). The Musketeers were finally eclipsed by the arrival of Ellsworth Vines, Fred Perry and Jack Crawford on the international tennis scene in the first half of the 1930s.

=== Fifth Musketeer ===
After Lacoste's withdrawal from competitive tennis in 1929, due to failing health, including respiratory disease he was replaced on the French Davis Cup team by Christian Boussus, earning him the nickname "Fifth Musketeer".

== Grand Slam finals ==
Grand Slam singles finals involving the Four Musketeers.

Result	Year	Championship	Surface	Winner	Finalist	Score
Win	1924	Wimbledon	Grass	(France) Jean Borotra	(France) René Lacoste	6–1, 3–6, 6–1, 3–6, 6–4
Win	1925	French Championships	Clay	(France) René Lacoste	(France) Jean Borotra	7–5, 6–1, 6–4
Win	1925	Wimbledon	Grass	(France) René Lacoste	(France) Jean Borotra	6–3, 6–3, 4–6, 8–6
Win	1926	French Championships	Clay	(France) Henri Cochet	(France) René Lacoste	6–2, 6–4, 6–3
Win	1926	Wimbledon	Grass	(France) Jean Borotra	(United States) Howard Kinsey	8–6, 6–1, 6–3
Win	1926	U.S. Championships	Grass	(France) René Lacoste	(France) Jean Borotra	6–4, 6–0, 6–4
Win	1927	French Championships	Clay	(France) René Lacoste	(United States) Bill Tilden	6–4, 4–6, 5–7, 6–3, 11–9
Win	1927	Wimbledon	Grass	(France) Henri Cochet	(France) Jean Borotra	4–6, 4–6, 6–3, 6–4, 7–5
Win	1927	U.S. Championships	Grass	(France) René Lacoste	(United States) Bill Tilden	11–9, 6–3, 11–9
Win	1928	Australian Championships	Grass	(France) Jean Borotra	(Australia) Jack Cummings	6–4, 6–1, 4–6, 5–7, 6–3
Win	1928	French Championships	Clay	(France) Henri Cochet	(France) René Lacoste	5–7, 6–3, 6–1, 6–3
Win	1928	Wimbledon	Grass	(France) René Lacoste	(France) Henri Cochet	6–1, 4–6, 6–4, 6–2
Win	1928	U.S. Championships	Grass	(France) Henri Cochet	(United States) Frank Hunter	4–6, 6–4, 3–6, 7–5, 6–3
Win	1929	French Championships	Clay	(France) René Lacoste	(France) Jean Borotra	6–3, 2–6, 6–0, 2–6, 8–6
Win	1929	Wimbledon	Grass	(France) Henri Cochet	(France) Jean Borotra	6–4, 6–3, 6–4
Win	1930	French Championships	Clay	(France) Henri Cochet	(United States) Bill Tilden	3–6, 8–6, 6–3, 6–1
Win	1931	French Championships	Clay	(France) Jean Borotra	(France) Christian Boussus	2–6, 6–4, 7–5, 6–4
Win	1932	French Championships	Clay	(France) Henri Cochet	(Italy) Giorgio de Stefani	6–0, 6–4, 4–6, 6–3
Loss	1932	U.S. Championships	Grass	(United States) Ellsworth Vines	(France) Henri Cochet	6–4, 6–4, 6–4
Loss	1933	French Championships	Clay	(Australia) Jack Crawford	(France) Henri Cochet	8–6, 6–1, 6–3

== Career statistics ==
Key
W	F	SF	QF	#R	RR	Q#	DNQ	A	NH

(W) winner; (F) finalist; (SF) semifinalist; (QF) quarterfinalist; (#R) rounds 4, 3, 2, 1; (RR) round-robin stage; (Q#) qualification round; (DNQ) did not qualify; (A) absent; (NH) not held; (SR) strike rate (events won / competed); (W–L) win–loss record.

(OF) only for French club members

=== Combined performance timeline (best result) ===
- Since the year of first slam win.

	1924	1925	1926	1927	1928	1929	1930	1931	1932	1933	SR
Grand Slam tournaments											18 / 27
Australian	A	A	A	A	W	A	A	A	A	A	1 / 1
French	OF	W	W	W	W	W	W	W	W	F	8 / 9
Wimbledon	W	W	W	W	W	W	SF	SF	4R	A	6 / 9
U.S.	QF	QF	W	W	W	A	1R	1R	F	A	3 / 8

== Legacy ==
The success of The Four Musketeers in winning the 1927 Davis Cup against the United States was directly responsible for the decision by the French Tennis Federation to build the Roland Garros venue at Porte d'Auteuil. The four men were national icons in France and all of them lived to be at least 83 years old, basking in glory for many years after their retirement from tennis. They were simultaneously inducted into the International Tennis Hall of Fame in Newport, Rhode Island, in 1976.

The New Musketeers, (Nouveaux Mousquetaires or néo-Mousquetaires) was first used to refer to the group of players in the 1980s and '90s who enjoyed the country's greatest success since the end of World War II. Yannick Noah won the French Open in 1983, Henri Leconte reached the final of the same tournament in 1988, and the two teamed up to win the men's doubles at Roland Garros in 1984. Leconte and Guy Forget then won France's first Davis Cup for almost sixty years in 1991, captained by Noah.

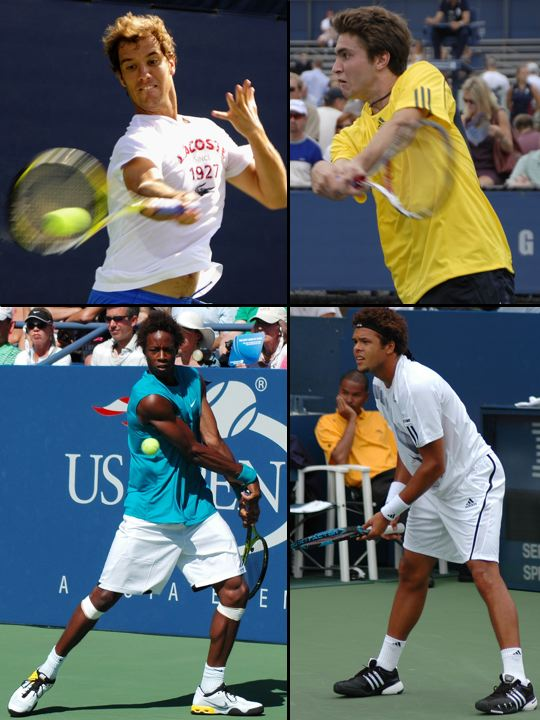
The New Musketeers (from top to bottom and left to right : Gasquet, Simon, Monfils and Tsonga) during the period 2008–2009.

A second group of New Musketeers, as coined in L'Équipe and adopted by the French press, refers to the 21st century squad of star players headlined by Jo-Wilfried Tsonga, Gaël Monfils, Richard Gasquet and Gilles Simon. In 2008, France boasted four Top 20 players, a feat never before achieved since computer rankings were established in 1973. This configuration of the same four players in the Top 20 has been reproduced in mid-2011, in early 2012 and early 2016.

== See also ==
- France Davis Cup team
- List of Davis Cup champions
- List of Grand Slam men's singles champions
- List of Grand Slam men's doubles champions
- List of male tennis players
- Big Three
