= Henri Cochet =

20th-century French tennis player

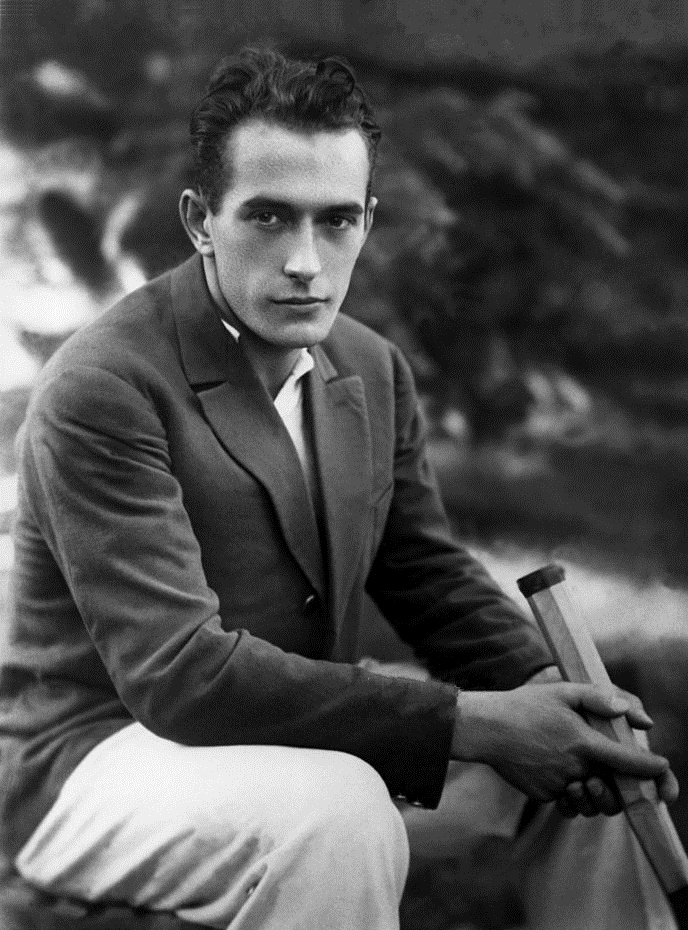
- Cochet at the 1924 Olympics
- Full name: Henri Jean Cochet
- Country (sports): France
- Born: 14 December 1901 Villeurbanne, France
- Died: 1 April 1987 (aged 85) Saint-Germain-en-Laye, France
- Height: 1.68 m (5 ft 6 in)
- Turned pro: 1933 (amateur tour from 1920)
- Retired: 1958 (as a reinstated amateur)
- Plays: Right-handed (one-handed backhand)
- Int. Tennis HoF: 1976 (member page)

Singles
- Career record: 684–186 (78.6%)
- Career titles: 90
- Highest ranking: No. 1 (1928, A. Wallis Myers)

Grand Slam singles results
- French Open: W (1926, 1928, 1930, 1932)
- Wimbledon: W (1927, 1929)
- US Open: W (1928)

Other tournaments
- WHCC: W (1922)
- WCCC: W (1922, 1923)
- Professional majors
- Wembley Pro: SF (1937)
- French Pro: W (1936)

Doubles
- Career record: 0–0

Grand Slam doubles results
- French Open: W (1927, 1930, 1932)
- Wimbledon: W (1926, 1928)

Other doubles tournaments
- WHCC: W (1922)
- WCCC: W (1922, 1923)

Mixed doubles

Grand Slam mixed doubles results
- French Open: W (1928, 1929)
- Wimbledon: SF (1930, 1932)
- US Open: W (1927)

Other mixed doubles tournaments
- WHCC: W (1922, 1923)

Team competitions
- Davis Cup: W (1927, 1928, 1929, 1930, 1931, 1932)
Medal record
Olympic Games – Tennis
Silver medal – second place	1924 Paris	Singles
Silver medal – second place	1924 Paris	Doubles

Henri Jean Cochet (French: [ɑ̃ʁi ʒɑ̃ ˈkɔʃɛ]; 14 December 1901 – 1 April 1987) was a French tennis player. He was a world No. 1 ranked player, and a member of the famous "Four Musketeers" from France who dominated tennis in the late 1920s and early 1930s.

Born in Villeurbanne, Rhône, Cochet won a total 22 majors including seven Grand Slam singles, five doubles and three mixed doubles. In addition he won three singles, two doubles and one mixed doubles ILTF majors. He also won one professional major in singles. During his major career, he won singles and doubles titles on three different surfaces: clay, grass and wood. He was ranked as world No. 1 player for four consecutive years, 1928 through 1931 by A. Wallis Myers. Cochet turned professional in 1933, but after a less than stellar pro career, he was reinstated as an amateur in 1945 after the end of World War II.

The Four Musketeers were inducted simultaneously into the International Tennis Hall of Fame in Newport, Rhode Island in 1976. Cochet died in 1987 in Paris at age 85.

== Early life and family ==
Henri Cochet was born on 14 December 1901 in Villeurbanne to Gustave Cochet and Antoinette Gailleton. His father was a groundkeeper at a Lyonnaise tennis club where Henri worked as a ball boy and thus had a chance to practise for free. He began playing at the age of eight along with his sister. The president of the club, a silk-factory owner and French-ranked player Georges Cozon, recognized his talent and volunteered to coach him. He entered his first local tournament in 1920 where he met his mentor in the final. Cochet then moved on to win a series of matches at Aix-les-Bains mostly scratch and handicap matches. In 1921 he decided to compete in Paris, which was the center of tennis life, and registered for the French Covered Courts tournament second-class draw, in which he reached the final where he beat Jean Borotra in five sets. That qualified him for entry at the 1921 French Closed Championships where he repeated his victory over Borotra and subsequently broke into the top ten French rankings at the end of the year. Also in 1921 he won the Military Championship of France. Meanwhile, his sister Aimée (Charpenel) Cochet also became a tennis player and competed in the main draw of the 1930 Wimbledon Championships.

== Tennis career ==
=== Rise to prominence (1922–1925) ===
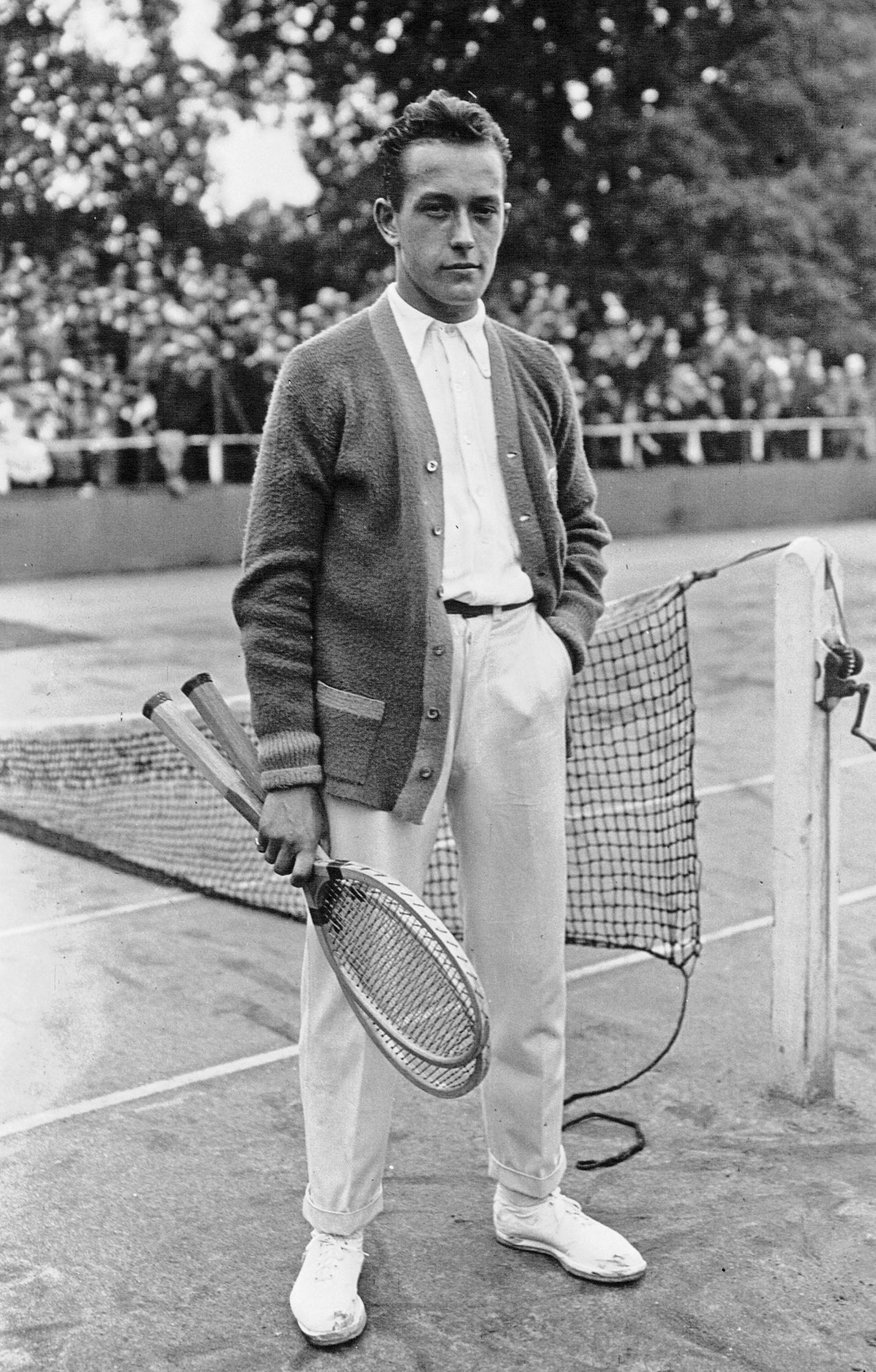
Cochet at the French Championships in 1922

In February 1922 Cochet traveled to the World Covered Court Championships in Saint Moritz in Switzerland where he defeated Borotra in a five-set final and formed a team with him to gain the doubles trophy against Jacques Brugnon and Marcel Dupont. He clinched the 1922 World Hard Court Championships in Brussels defeating Count Manuel de Gomar in the singles final and triumphing in the doubles events, partnering Jean Borotra and Suzanne Lenglen respectively. After his success abroad Cochet claimed the French Closed Championships by defeating defending champion Jean Samazeuilh in the final. Afterwards Cochet topped the French rankings. In June 1922 he debuted in the French Davis Cup team against Denmark and won both his singles and the doubles match. In the next round the team only composed of him and André Gobert and fell to the Australasian team. Cochet also found moderate success in the minor tournaments; at the South of France Championships he lost to Russian Count Mikhail Sumarokov-Elston. At the Côte d'Azur Championships Cochet warded off the Englishman Morgan for his first Riviera title. After winning the Hard and Clay Court World Championships in 1922 Cochet was ranked 6th by A. Wallis Myers's world's best ten list^{a} .

In February 1923 Cochet retained his World Covered Court Championships title, defeating John B. Gilbert in the final in straight sets. On 1 April 1924 he met René Lacoste in the championships match for the Beausite trophy of Cannes and beat his compatriot in straight sets. At the 1924 Summer Olympics Cochet won the silver medal in both the singles and doubles with his teammate Borotra, while Vincent Richards took the gold for the United States in both events, pairing with Frank Hunter for the latter. He was ranked the number one player of France alongside Lacoste and Borotra at the end of the year and was ranked 9th in A. Wallis Myers' world ranking list for 1924. Due to his business affairs and injuries Cochet missed most of the 1925 season, while he kept his French first place shared with Borotra. The French International Championships of that year marked the first instance of an all-Four Musketeers final in the doubles of the Championships where Brugnon and Lacoste were victorious against Cochet and Borotra.

=== The Musketeers Era (1926–1933) ===
==== International success (1926–1927) ====
In January 1926, Cochet defeated Henry Mayes for the New Courts of Cannes Championships and repeated this feat on the first day of February in the final of the Gallia L.T.C. of Cannes tournament. In March for his first Menton crown he engaged in a five set battle against Hungarian champion Béla von Kehrling and prevailed. Cochet again came short to win a triple crown the following week at the Parc Impérial where despite winning both doubles with Julie Vlasto and Italian champion Umberto de Morpurgo he dropped the singles to his latter doubles partner. A week later at the Côte d'Azur Championships he overcame Swiss champion Charles Aeschlimann in straights finishing the match with a love set. Cochet also won the mixed title with Helen Wills. At the 1926 French Championships in June he dethroned René Lacoste as the titleholder and reached the top spot again in the French rankings. A month later he clinched his first non-francophone title in the 1926 Wimbledon Championships doubles playing with Jacques Brugnon. In September the 1926 U.S. National Championships were invaded by the French top players and they each reached the quarterfinal stage. Their opponents were Americans Bill Tilden, Vincent Richards, Bill Johnston and Norris Williams. At the so-called "Black Thursday", three Americans yielded to the French, Cochet defeated Tilden, ending his six-year winning streak at Forest Hills and only lost to compatriot Lacoste who became the first foreign US champion since Laurence Doherty in 1903. Cochet was ranked in the top three in A. Wallis Myers 1926 World rankings and world second in doubles with Jean Borotra.

He began his 1927 training in Cannes in January by collecting back-to-back series of French Riviera cups, including a triple crown victory at the Métropole Club and Carlton Club, and a doubles at the New Courts L.T.C. He continued with a triple crown at Gallia L.T.C. also in Cannes and a second triple feat at the Nice Lawn Tennis Club. Cochet triumphed at the doubles events at the Hotel Bristol of Beaulieu in mid-February. In Marseille he was upset by Christian Boussus in the semi-finals. In April at the Championnats de la Côte Basque of Pau he overcame Eduardo Flaquer in singles, and with Jacques Brugnon finished second behind the Spanish duo of Flaquer and Raimundo Morales-Marquez, while the mixed went also to Cochet and Germaine le Conte. In June the Four Musketeers held their second all-French doubles final of the 1927 French Championships where Cochet and Brugnon beat Borotra and Lacoste.

All these achievements were a prelude to the 1927 Wimbledon Championships where in successive rounds fourth-seeded Cochet defeated two leading Americans Frank Hunter and Bill Tilden and finally Jean Borotra in remarkable five set matches, all of whom had a two-sets advantage against him. Tilden served for the match, leading 5–1 in the third set and had a match ball. In the final Borotra left six match points unconverted to open the route for Cochet's revival. With the latter one Cochet set a Wimbledon final comeback record that stands up to this day. He then again met Hunter and Tilden in the final of the doubles, this time he joining forces with Jacques Brugnon and lost the championship despite having a match point. This was the first of three consecutive encounters between the French and American teams as in early September the 1927 Davis Cup final took place in the United States where the US Davis Cup team led by Tilden and Hunter faced the challenging team of the Musketeers. France won 3–2 with Cochet victorious in the decider against Bill Johnston and reclaiming the Davis Cup for France the first time since 1920. A couple of days later the French troupe went to compete in the U.S. National Championships at the West Side Tennis Club in New York. Cochet and Eileen Bennett became the mixed doubles champions. When he returned home in the first week of October Cochet took revenge on Christian Boussus in their second meeting in the final of the Coupe Porée of Paris. The same week he was ranked third in the world for the second consecutive year although this time he finished ahead of compatriot Borotra. In November he won the Swiss Covered Courts Internationals in a short twenty-five-minute final against Donald Greig.

==== Breakthrough season (1928) ====
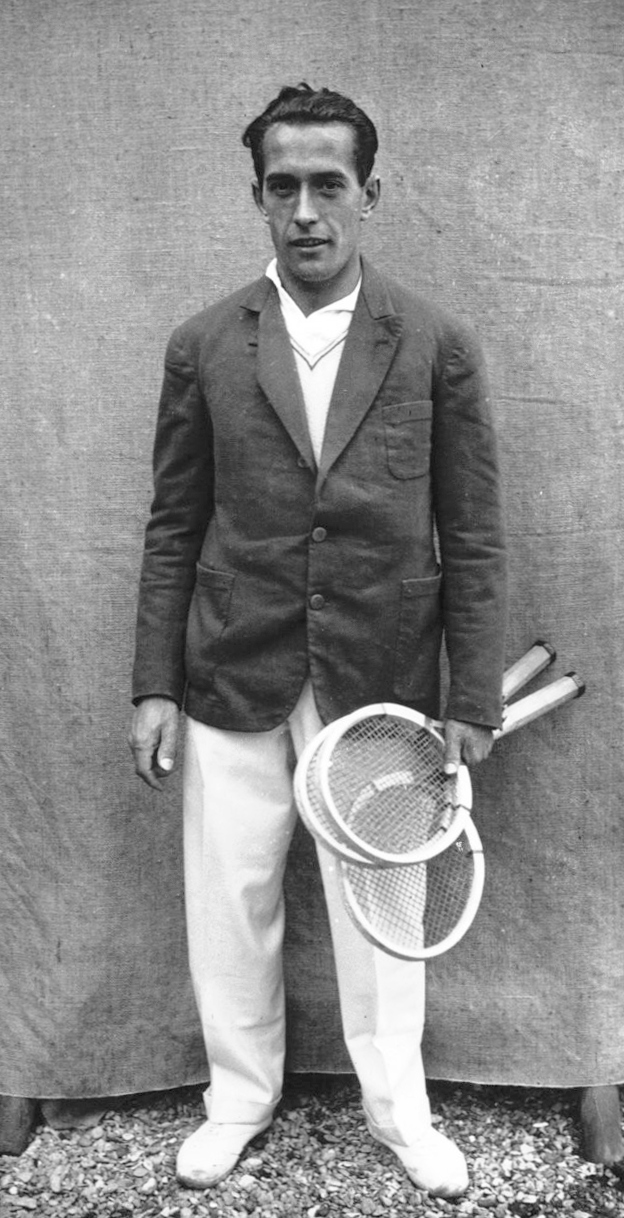
Cochet in 1928

1928 was the first year of Cochet's hegemony of the world rankings. This was the result of his overall season, that as usual commenced on the French Riviera. Prior to that he was drafted into a Queen's Club – Sporting Club de Paris warm-up team challenge. He contributed to the Parisian victory with two mixed and a singles win. The following month he swept almost all available Riviera titles from February to March. He kicked off the tour by winning his first mixed New Courts L.T.C title with his U.S. Championships partner Eileen Bennett. In February he successfully defended his Métropole Club and Gallia L.T.C. singles titles by defeating Henry Mayes twice in a row. In the Monaco Cup at the La Festa Country Club Cochet turned the tide from two sets down against two-times reigning champion Béla von Kehrling, the first meeting of a rivalry that continued onward into the year. They both reached the mixed doubles final, which remained unplayed and the prize was divided. The Cochet – Brugnon pair also won the Butler Cup there (reserved for doubles of the same nationality). At the Nice Lawn Tennis Club tournament they met again for the singles contest and Cochet won in straight sets. Cochet completed his second triple crown there. In Menton at the official Riviera Championships eventual singles victor Von Kehrling and former Danish Champion Erik Worm warded off Cochet and Count Salm in the doubles final. In the mixed Von Kehrling and Cilly Aussem beat the seasoned duo Cochet–Bennett. His third Côte d'Azur Championships trophy was granted to him after Otto Froitzheim traveled home before the final and gave him a walkover. One week later at the 50th Cannes Championships he reached the final to face Henry Mayes again, but due to misunderstandings he was 10 minutes late and had been defaulted from the tournament. Subsequently, he lost the mixed doubles match alongside Phyllis Satterthwaite and only found his form in the doubles with Jack Hillyard at the expense of their opponents Count Salm and Worm. In April at the Biarritz tournament Cochet routed compatriot Roger George in four sets. He was victorious in Marseille versus Emmanuel du Plaix and in the mixed with Cilly Aussem. The Miramar L.T.C. tournament in Juan-les-Pins resulted in a three set final between René Gallèpe of Monaco and Cochet and ended in favor of the Frenchman.

Cochet then set to compete across Europe. As the reigning champions the French Davis Cup team had only one scheduled challenge match during the season and could skip the preliminary rounds. Lacoste and Cochet entered the British Hard Court Championships. Pat Spence eliminated Cochet in the semi-final stage but lost to Lacoste in the final. Cochet and Bennett gained the mixed doubles title. In May he accepted a one-on-one and a doubles challenge with Béla von Kehrling and the Hungarian Davis Cup team in Budapest. In front of a local crowd of 3000, Cochet won in four sets against the home favorite. The doubles match between Von Kehrling – Jenő Péteri and Cochet – Roger Danet was indefinitely suspended due to bad light conditions at one set each. The next stop was in Vienna where he won the Austrian International Championships. Returning home he secured his French International Championships title by overcoming Lacoste in the final in four sets. The doubles were won by Jean Borotra and Jacques Brugnon despite the efforts of Cochet and René de Buzelet. Cochet and recurring partner Bennett added the French hard courts mixed title to their set of accolades after defeating Helen Wills, women's world champion, and Frank Hunter, the No. 2 USLTA player in a three-set championship match. On 6 July at the 1928 Wimbledon Championships Lacoste equalized with a victory over Cochet and deprived him of the title. Cochet and Bennett lost in the mixed quarterfinals. Cochet and Brugnon won the doubles again over Gerald Patterson and John Hawkes after their 1926 triumph. At the end of July in the Challenge round of the Davis Cup at Roland Garros the Musketeers, with the absence of Brugnon, defeated the United States to keep the trophy in French possession. Cochet won all three of his rubbers.

The overseas campaign of Cochet started at the U.S. National Championships, which he kept for France for the third straight time. His opponent in the final was Frank Hunter who was defeated in a five-set match. In October the French supremacy continued with him and Christian Boussus sharing the final Pacific Southwest Championships of Los Angeles, Cochet claimed that title as well. In early December Racing Club de Paris, Cochet's club, visited Hamburg for an inter-club match. The French team left with a landslide victory over the German top ranked players; the score was eleven to one. He finished the year with the Coupe de Noël in Paris during the last days of December. The final saw Jean Borotra forfeiting to Cochet.

Cochet was ranked World No. 1 amateur in 1928 by A. Wallis Myers, Pierre Gillou (L'Auto), Bill Tilden, F. Gordon Lowe (The Scotsman), W. J. Daish and Vincent Richards.

==== French dominance (1929) ====
The 1929 season did not begin as flawless as the previous one; on 20 January Jean Borotra beat Cochet in their first ever Belgian Covered Courts tournament final, which took five sets to decide. Cochet won the Gallia tournament for the fourth time and the Monte Carlo Cup for the second time, eliminating Italian aces Giorgio de Stefani in the semi-final and Umberto de Morpurgo for the former championships and de Morpurgo again for the latter. He also defended his Monaco mixed title for the first time and the Butler Cup for the third. But he lost in Roubaix and in Biarritz to Christian Boussus (5th in French rankings^{b} ) and Pierre Henri Landry (7th in French rankings^{c} ) respectively, which raised concerns and let to newspaper speculation about a loss of form. In Berlin at the Rot-Weiss Club Tournament he defeated Roderich Menzel in the singles event and clinched the doubles with Jacques Brugnon. His only loss came in the mixed doubles with Cilly Aussem against teammate Brugnon and Bobby Heine, which went to three sets. He successfully defended the Austrian championships against Franz Wilhelm Matejka and claimed the doubles with Roger Danet. He claimed the Czechoslovak Championships from fellow countryman Christian Boussus. They joined forces and together won the doubles.

In May at the 34th French Championships the men's doubles tournament took place first. With Lacoste – Borotra's victory over Tilden – Hunter and Cochet – Brugnon's easy win over Gregory – Collins in the semi-finals secured the Four Musketeers their third doubles face-to-face final. Unfortunately for Cochet in the fifth set they were serving for the match and had thirty-love in the game, when Brugnon missed an easy ball when three match points were at stake. Lacoste and Borotra revived from that moment on and closed out the final set 8–6. In singles he was put out of the contest by Borotra in the semi-finals and thus was unable to retain his title. However, Cochet did not leave without a trophy as the mixed championship was earned by him and Eileen Bennett Whittingstall.

Cochet then set out for an exhibition tour through central Europe in June, playing in Budapest, Belgrade and Vienna.

===== Rivalry with the United States team =====
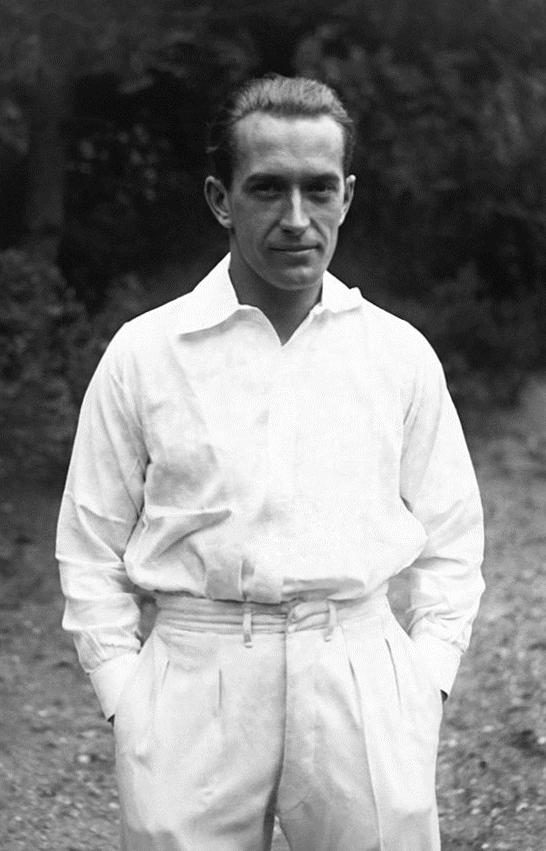
Cochet in 1929

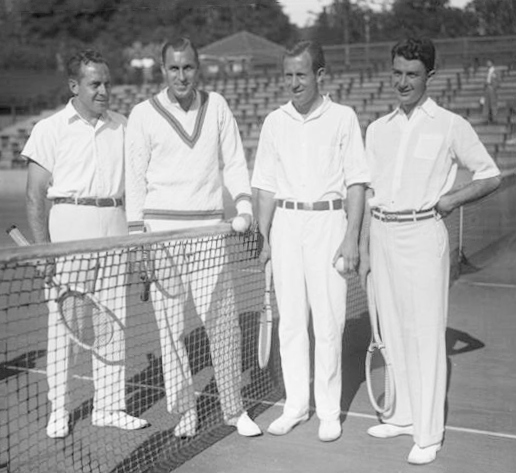
The United States Davis Cup team

Cochet was seeded first at the 1929 Wimbledon Championships. He marched through the earlier rounds, having only one five-set match against Irish champion George Lyttleton-Rogers. In the quarterfinals he beat Hendrik Timmer in straights, then Bill Tilden in the semi-finals also in straights and second seeded compatriot Jean Borotra for the championship in his third straight sets victory in a row. Despite this he lost 63 games throughout the tournament, which was the most among the seeded players (third-seeded semi-finalist Tilden only lost 27). In doubles he reached the quarterfinals with Jacques Brugnon but was beaten by Wilmer Allison and John Van Ryn, who later became champions. In the mixed doubles draw the titleholders Cochet and Eileen Bennett Whittingstall lost to eventual runners-up Joan Fry and Ian Collins in three sets. The singles victory marked the sixth straight time that a French player won Wimbledon and the fifth time that the final was contested between two Frenchmen, counting from the first French victory in 1924. A couple of days later in the Regent's Park the top Wimbledon players participated in an exhibition event to raise funds for children of the British war cripples.

In July the French team was challenged by the United States team in the 1929 Davis Cup three-day final. On 26 July 12,000 people watched the first day of the encounter at the Roland Garros stadium. The French squad took the lead when Borotra beat George Lott. The second match was scheduled between Cochet and Tilden. The American started off poorly; he was not able to win one single point in the first game, hit many unforced errors, especially in the longer rallies, and Cochet pulled away and took the set. In the second Tilden forced a backhand game, but it did not pay off, and he lost that set as well, six games to one. Tilden relied on his serves but was only capable of winning six games in the whole match when he lost the third set six to two. According to contemporary statistics Cochet did not hit any unforced errors of faults during the match. The next day French captain Pierre Gillou sent Cochet and Borotra for the doubles rubber. Cochet was exhausted and showed the opposite form compared to the previous day. Despite all efforts by his partner Borotra, Cochet hit most of the balls out or into the net. The American duo of Wilmer Allison and John Van Ryn took a three-set win. The third day Tilden saved the hopes for his team when he beat Borotra in front of a capacity crowd of 15,000. The deciding rubber was between Cochet and George Lott. Cochet won in four sets and claimed the Cup for France for the third time.

After the Davis Cup tie Cochet only played in minor tournament and doubles matches. He won the singles in La Baule against Raymond Rodel and the mixed doubles in Vals-les-Bains. Rodel, Cochet, Jacques Brugnon and Pierre Henri Landry, representing the Racing Club de Paris, sailed to Japan for a series of friendly matches against the Japanese Davis Cup team where Cochet suffered a surprise defeat against Takeichi Harada. They then visited India to face the Indian Davis Cup team in a series of exhibitions. Cochet won all of his matches. In 1929 Cochet was ranked World number one amateur by A Wallis Myers, Hungarian tennis magazine Tennisz és Golf, edited by Béla von Kehrling, by rival Bill Tilden, F. Gordon Lowe, L'Auto and Vincent Richards Evidently he led the French rankings as well. In December he was inducted as Honorary Member to the U.S.L.T.A. in New York.

==== The Four Musketeers become three (1930) ====
In early 1930 Cochet decided to rest and only compete in doubles contests. He won at Gallia L.T.C., Carlton L.T.C. (also in mixed doubles with Elizabeth Ryan), Biarritz, La Baule mixed doubles with Ryan. His only singles loss came at the Belgian International Championships to Jean Borotra. His most successful French Championships came in this year when he was close to winning a triple crown after being victorious in singles over Bill Tilden, in doubles with Jacques Brugnon over Harry Hopman and James Willard and was a finalist in the mixed tournament as well. At the 1930 Wimbledon Championships he was seeded first but made an early exit after his straight-set loss to Wilmer Allison in the quarterfinals. In the doubles Cochet—Brugnon lost in the semi-finals as well as in mixed doubles with Eileen Bennett Whittingstall.

While playing tennis he took up volunteer coaching, training French children in Paris every Sunday. In the sixth straight United States–France Davis Cup final the American team had a great start thanks to Bill Tilden, who handed Borotra the first loss of the tie. Cochet equalized against George Lott, winning in straight sets. In the doubles Cochet—Brugnon were selected to compete against Wimbledon champions John van Ryn and Wilmer Allison. Contrary to expectations it was Borotra who was the engine of the French pair. He won every service game, except for the third set where Cochet made a lot of errors at the net, and the French pair took the victory. Borotra thrilled the French spectators by beating Lott and keeping the Cup in France for another year. The dead rubber between Cochet and Tilden was won by the former. At the end of the year Cochet was ranked World number one amateur by A. Wallis Myers, Pierre Gillou, and Didier Poulain (L'Auto) but came second in the list of Bill Tilden behind Borotra.

==== Health issues (1931) ====
In 1931 Cochet retained the Carlton L.T.C. doubles with Brugnon. In March he defeated George Lyttleton-Rogers for his third Monaco Cup crown. With Eileen Bennett Whittingstall they were crowned the mixed victors. Cochet became the Danish Covered Courts champion for the first time after defeating Danish national champion Einer Ulrich in Copenhagen. He won the mixed contest as well with Simone Barbier. He was invited by his hometown club F.C. Lyon to an interclub match with German Uhlenhorster Klipper. Cochet won all three of his matches. In the Moncean Club of Paris he partnered Paul Féret and Colette Rosambert and swept the doubles and mixed doubles respectively.

At mid-season, Zürich newspaper Sport ranked the top 15 European players, and listed Cochet first (Borotra second, Brugnon ninth). At that time Cochet was struggling with a shoulder injury. For the 50th anniversary of the Wiener Park Club of Vienna a tournament was organized with an international line-up. The two biggest contenders Cochet and Roderich Menzel met in the final, Cochet made a comeback from one set down to lift the trophy. He then toured Europe to give exhibitions in Cluj-Napoca, Budapest and Prague. Because of fever and a sore throat Cochet missed the French Championships. He did not recover from his illness before the second Italian International Championships but this did not prevent Cochet from signing up for the competition. With titleholder Tilden having turned professional and Cochet's condition, the championships went easily to George Patrick Hughes. Cochet entered the finals of the doubles too, but his partner André Merlin could not make up for Cochet's bad shape and they lost to Alberto Del Bono and singles victor Hughes.

After these losses Cochet took two weeks off to recover. Despite the rest in the 1931 Wimbledon Championships he shocked the tennis world by losing in the very first round to Nigel Sharpe. In the mixed doubles Cochet and Eileen Bennett Whittingstall were not more successful, falling in the fourth round. The doubles final remained unconquered for Brugnon and Cochet as the team of George Lott and John Van Ryn came back from 3–2 down in the fifth set to win the match. In July the Four Musketeers were ready to be challenged for the fifth time in the Davis Cup final. This time the opponent was the British Davis Cup team. In the first rubber Cochet was facing two set points for a two sets-love lead by Bunny Austin but fought back to claim the second set and won the next two for the match. Fred Perry battled through Borotra while the doubles were won by Cochet and Brugnon. Austin brought back the British hopes after a four set victory over the exhausted Borotra. The match was suspended multiple times due to rain, which made the court almost unsuitable for playing, which left its mark on the deciding rubber between Cochet and Perry. The recurring slight rain in the first set led Perry to drop the set from a 4–1 advantage. The second set went to Perry after he utilized passing shots as a counter for Cochet's net play. The third and fourth set however were taken by Cochet which gave the French team its fifth successive Davis Cup.

Despite his turbulent year Cochet was ranked number one by A. Wallis Myers, Pierre Gillou, Didier Poulain, Stanley Doust, Bill Tilden, Noel Dickson (Melbourne Herald), "Service" (Western Mail) and Sport magazine (Zurich).

==== Rivalry with Vines and turning professional (1932–33) ====
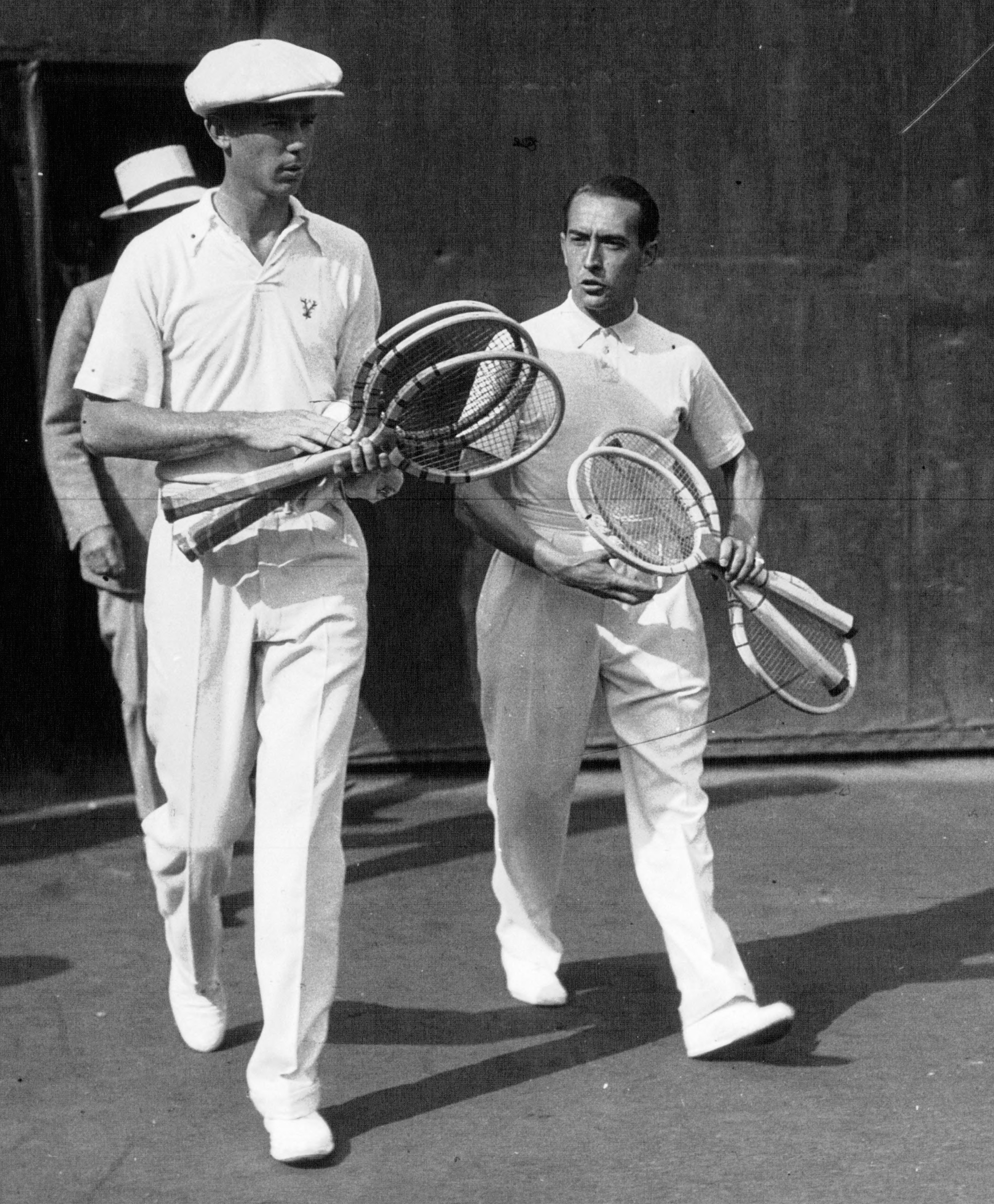
Vines (left), who pushed Cochet (right) off the world number one rank in 1932 (Pictured: Davis Cup, same year)

During 1932 Cochet restricted his schedule to appearances at Monaco Cups, the French Championships, Wimbledon, U.S. National Championships and the Davis Cup and a minor tournament in Paris. In Monaco the Butler Trophy were won by Cochet and Jacques Brugnon over the Czechoslovak duo of Roderich Menzel and Ferenc Marsalek. The mixed doubles was granted to Cochet and Colette Rosambert following the retirement of Béla von Kehrling and Elizabeth Ryan prior to the match due to the leg pain of Ryan. After that good start Cochet was ranked number one by Pierre Gillou right ahead of Ellsworth Vines and Bunny Austin.

In early June he won his fifth and last French Championships, beating Giorgio de Stefani in the final in four sets. Cochet also won his third doubles French Championships, this time with Jacques Brugnon. In the mixed event he reached the last four partnering Eileen Whittingstall and came up short against Fred Perry and Betty Nuthall. His combined record-breaking ten French titles of the 17 title matches are the most possessed by a male player.

A couple of weeks later in late June in the Wimbledon singles he again suffered a surprise loss to Ian Collins in the second round. In the mixed event Cochet and Whittingstall lost in semi-final stage, this time to Enrique Maier and Elizabeth Ryan. The singles competition was won by Ellsworth Vines, his first non-American title. The American Davis Cup team traveled back to France to challenge the reigning holder at the Stade Roland Garros. The French Musketeers secured the cup for the sixth and final time after four rubbers, losing only the doubles match. Cochet and Vines met in the dead fifth rubber. The face-off between the two was one of the few encounters that later had a decisive effect on the rankings. Vines ameliorated his team's result by defeating Cochet in five sets. The two European major champions then met in the final of the U.S. National Championships final in September. Vines kept the national title home with his second win, a straight sets 6–4 victory over Cochet. Vines and Keith Gledhill subsequently beat Cochet and Marcel Bernard in the doubles final. Cochet and Virginia Rice were dropped out in the mixed semi-final while Vines reached the finals. These losses sealed the fate of the year-end rankings.

In November Cochet only competed in the Toussaint tournament, held at the Tennis Club de Paris, alongside Colette Rosambert with whom he lost to Jean Borotra and his more skilled female partner Helen Wills Moody. The year 1932 marked the first time Cochet slipped off the top of the charts after switching places with Vines. In June 1933 Cochet, seeded first, relinquished his French Championships title to Australian Jack Crawford, who overwhelmed him in the final in three straight sets, becoming the first non-French player to possess it. In July the French team lost the Davis Cup for the first time since 1927. In front of their home crowd on the clay courts of Roland Garros, but without Lacoste and Borotra, the French team lost 3–2 to Great Britain. Cochet was defeated by Fred Perry and won against Bunny Austin, both in five sets. At the 1933 Wimbledon Championships first-seeded Vines conquered Cochet, who was seeded third, in straight sets in the semi-final. It was the third time in a row that Vines beat Cochet. These events marked the end of the Four Musketeers era.

=== Professional career (1933–1939) ===
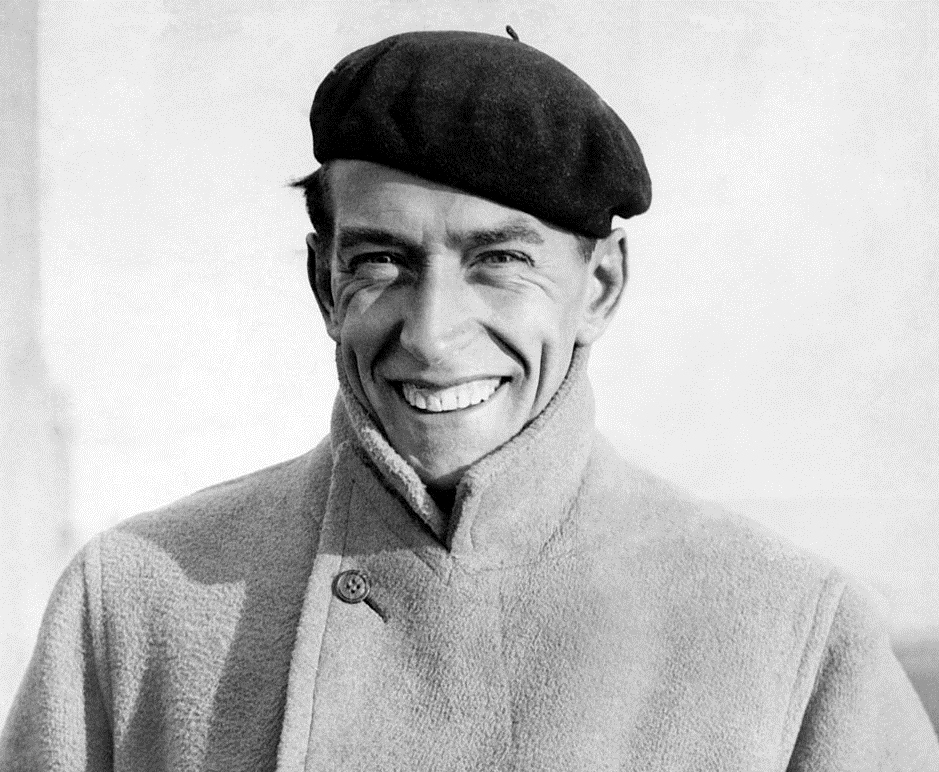
Cochet in the early 1930s

1933

On 9 September 1933 Cochet turned professional, signing a contract with the Tilden Tennis Tour for a guaranteed annual payment of £25,000 and he joined the team of Bill Tilden and Martin Plaa. Although he was still featured on the amateur world rankings published on the 20th of the month, where he was listed one spot behind Ellsworth Vines at number six, Cochet was also on Pierre Gillou's list in fourth place, also right after Vines. Cochet made his professional debut in a Franco-American match on 22 September and defeated Bruce Barnes. Three days later he lost to Tilden in straight sets. He also made appearances at the French Riviera with Plaa with back and forth matches across France. On 10 October Tilden signed Vines to the pro tour and from then Cochet's archrival and him competed within the same league again.

1934

In early 1934 Cochet went on to showcase in Santiago and Vina del Mar, where he was challenged by the Pilo Facondi and Perico Facondi brothers, Chile's leading professionals, who both lost two matches each against Cochet. Plaa and Cochet returned in February to the Madison Square Garden where Vines and Tilden were already practising and waiting for them. In New York, Vines and Tilden outclassed Cochet in a four and five-set match respectively and the Americans were victorious in the doubles over the French pair as well. During the ten-city tour across the United States and Canada, the Tilden-Cochet match was always the main fixture. Tilden finished the tour as winner by an eight to two head-to-head margin against Cochet. In April in Providence Cochet was drawn to play Vincent Richards in singles and with Plaa played Barnes and Richards, both matches resulted in a French two straight sets victory. Cochet and Richards toured North America in April and May.

The first official tournament of a new tournament circuit was held in May at the Park Avenue Tennis Club, New York and was called the Eastern Pro Championships. Cochet finished in fourth place in the concluding round-robin. In late May Philadelphia hosted the Middle States tournament at its Germantown Cricket Club; Cochet advanced to the semi-final where Tilden's superiority proved to be his undoing. Cochet then sailed home to France and consequently missed the US Pro Tennis Championships. He chose instead to gather money in exhibition matches in Havana, Haiti, and Martinique on his way home. In France the official tour continued in Bayonne in August, where Cochet dropped his two singles matches to Tilden and Keith Gledhill in front of a home crowd. A Marseille team event was scheduled in September where Cochet lost to Tilden, equalized against Gledhill and lost again in the doubles with Plaa to the Americans, who took the final victory as well. Two weeks later in a single-elimination tournament at Cochet's native Lyon Football Club he almost delighted the crowd with home victory but Tilden stole the second and third set to spoil the feat. Cochet subsequently suffered from an illness and missed the following events. Throughout the season Cochet earned a total of $17.381.

1935

Cochet spent most of 1935 with a promotional tour across the globe, sponsored by the French government, which included Egypt, India, East Indies, Singapore, the Philippines, Vietnam, China and its final destination Australasia. At the Milton Courts in Brisbane his invited opponent was the recently turned professional Jack Cummings whom he battled twice, finishing one-all. The next opponent was James Willard and the match set up in Rushcutters Bay of Sydney, which served as a less-hard victory than that over Cummings. In a combined amateur and professional world ranking published by Pierre Gillou, president of the Fédération Française de Tennis (FFT), Cochet was ranked 10th.

1936

In 1936 Cochet had a second chance to regain his spotlight when he was first seeded French Pro Championship after Bill Tilden and Bruce Barnes failed to show up due to travel issues. Cochet had a clean march to the final beating Martin Plaa on the way and faced Robert Ramillon for the title. In the end he celebrated his first Pro Major triumph since leaving the amateur class. He and his Irish partner Albert Burke were also the doubles champions with a win over the said French professionals. Next came the International Pro Championship of Britain where the round robin format resulted in a decider between Cochet and Hans Nüsslein. The German proved to be unstoppable as he scored a 6–3, 6–2, 6–2 upset over Cochet. Cochet found consolation in the doubles, where he completed a round robin flawless streak with his teammate Ramillon especially the last match over the American pair Lester Stoefen and Bill Tilden. He then held tennis shows across the Soviet Union including Moscow, Leningrad, and Kiev.

1937

In June 1937 he did not succeed in defending his French Pro title as Hans Nüsslein took it from him in three sets. The doubles final was played between Stoefen–Tilden and Cochet-Ramillon with the former team crowned champions in the end. Cochet then repeated the Soviet tour and missed the German Pro and the Bonnardel Cup. He returned to the tour at the end of September at the Wembley Pro where he won one match and was then knocked out at the semifinal stage by Tilden. Cochet then was a part of a rather fruitless Italian tour, his only notably victory came in the Foro Italico against Tilden. In late November and early December 1937, Tilden and Cochet toured Egypt.

1938

1938 was spent mostly with Cochet-Tilden headlined trips to Asia and Ireland. Cochet also returned to the Soviet Union for the third straight time to accept a coaching venture, which turned out to be a short-term assignment as the Soviet government accused him of espionage and expelled him.

1939

In the last pre-World War II year Cochet's pro status allowed him to accept the request of the Hungarian Davis Cup team to become its trainer. He was then invited to the World Pro Championships, which was held at the Roland Garros in June–July. Cochet and Tilden were on the same half of the draw and it set up a quarter-final clash which Cochet was forced out of the tournament in five sets. He and Ramillon had a shot at the doubles title but they came short against pro newcomer Don Budge and veteran Ellsworth Vines.

=== During Second World War (1939–1945) ===
In 1940 France was overrun by Nazi Germany and for a brief period of time Cochet fell into war captivity. After his release he was not allowed to leave the country. He launched his own sporting goods store in Paris and lived on a farm in the outskirts. He gave tennis broadcasts, and accepted the Vichy government's offer to head its youth tennis program and after that to become a sports commissioner, who organized sport programmes for the deported French armament workers. In December 1940 the first open tennis tournament, combining amateur and professional players, was organized in Paris where Cochet lost to Paul Féret. In December 1941 he regained his amateur status granted by the French Tennis Association. This was in line with the sports policy of the Vichy regime which opposed professionalism. The policy was administered by Borotra who had been appointed General Commissioner for Education and Sports in August 1940.

In 1942 a Closed French Championships was announced and the doubles was won by Cochet and Bernard Destremau. In 1943 he reached the singles finals in the same nationals losing it to Yvon Petra. He also participated in charity matches to raise funds for the prisoners of the Axis powers. The next year Cochet met Petra for the title and lost for the second consecutive time. In the last wartime championships of France he won the doubles title alongside Pierre Pellizza. Despite being a reinstated amateur he was still ranked 9th in the first official pro rankings published by the World's Professional Tennis Association in 1945. After the End of World War II in Europe he played his first international match in Paris against Bill Sidwell, which he easily won.

=== Last amateur years (1945–1958) ===
Post-war tennis life resumed at the 1945–46 International Christmas Tournament of Barcelona where Yvon Petra dismissed Cochet in four sets. They reunited for the doubles event, which went to the home favorite duo of Jaime Bartrolí and Pedro Masip. At the time Cochet was the coach of Petra. In January the following year he reached the doubles final of the Estoril International Tournament partnering Robert Abdesselam. They met in singles competition in March at the Egypt International Championships where Cochet outplayed Abdesselam in straight sets. In July he celebrated his first Dutch championships title at Noordwijk with an overwhelming victory over Eustace Fannin. In 1948 a rivalry emerged between him and Spaniard Masip. They met in the French Covered Court Championship final where it took five sets to decide the outcome in favor of Masip. Also in Paris in April Cochet failed to capture the International Championships title dropping it to Marcel Bernard. In the 1948–49 International Christmas Tournament of Barcelona Cochet met Masip in the doubles final, where the Spanish team of Masip-Carles granted a walkover to Cochet and Australian Jack Harper. In April 1949 Cochet knocked out Masip from the Paris International Tournament in the quarterfinals. They joined forces for the doubles contest, which they subsequently won. In May he faced Masip again in the championships match of the British Hard Court Championships, and lost to him in four sets. In August he was a singles and doubles finalist in the International Championships of Istanbul. In singles he was overcome by Gottfried von Cramm and in doubles by von Cramm and Harper. In December he finally acquired the Barcelona title by beating Harper in five sets.

Cochet played one of his last matches at the Swiss covered courts championships in St. Moritz, returning to the scene of his very first tennis triumph after a 36-year hiatus. At the age of 56 with his partner Bernard Destremau he managed to pass the first round of the doubles contest with a 6–2, 6–1 win over locals D. Wegs and H. Flury. Cochet retired from tennis later that year.

== Personal life ==
Cochet married Germaine Desthieux on 16 April 1926. He taught her how to play tennis and later entered minor tournaments together. Apart from playing tennis Cochet was an amateur ice-hockey player. He ran a sporting goods store in Paris. Cochet was an occasional coach as well and in 1930 he coached the French junior tennis team once a week for free including his brother-in-law Georges Desthieux who won the New Malden tournament that year. He was awarded the Red Ribbon of the Legion of Honour for his sport merits in 1951. He died on 1 April 1987, aged 85, in Saint-Germain-en-Laye.

== Grand Slam finals ==
=== Singles: 10 (7 titles, 3 runners-up) ===
Result	Year	Championship	Surface	Opponent	Score
Win	1926	French Championships	Clay	(France) René Lacoste	6–2, 6–4, 6–3
Win	1927	Wimbledon	Grass	(France) Jean Borotra	4–6, 4–6, 6–3, 6–4, 7–5
Win	1928	French Championships	Clay	(France) René Lacoste	5–7, 6–3, 6–1, 6–3
Loss	1928	Wimbledon	Grass	(France) René Lacoste	1–6, 6–4, 4–6, 2–6
Win	1928	U.S. National Championships	Grass	(United States) Frank Hunter	4–6, 6–4, 3–6, 7–5, 6–3
Win	1929	Wimbledon	Grass	(France) Jean Borotra	6–4, 6–3, 6–4
Win	1930	French Championships	Clay	(United States) Bill Tilden	3–6, 8–6, 6–3, 6–1
Win	1932	French Championships	Clay	(Italy) Giorgio de Stefani	6–0, 6–4, 4–6, 6–3
Loss	1932	U.S. National Championships	Grass	(United States) Ellsworth Vines	4–6, 4–6, 4–6
Loss	1933	French Championships	Clay	(Australia) Jack Crawford	6–8, 1–6, 3–6

=== Doubles: 11 (5 titles, 6 runners-up) ===
Result	Year	Championship	Surface	Partner	Opponents	Score
Loss	1925	French Championships	Clay	(France) Jacques Brugnon	(France) Jean Borotra (France) René Lacoste	5–7, 6–4, 3–6, 6–2, 3–6
Loss	1926	French Championships	Clay	(France) Jacques Brugnon	(United States) Howard Kinsey (United States) Vincent Richards	4–6, 1–6, 6–4, 4–6
Win	1926	Wimbledon	Grass	(France) Jacques Brugnon	(United States) Howard Kinsey (United States) Vincent Richards	7–5, 4–6, 6–3, 6–2
Win	1927	French Championships	Clay	(France) Jacques Brugnon	(France) Jean Borotra (France) René Lacoste	2–6, 6–2, 6–0, 1–6, 6–4
Loss	1927	Wimbledon	Grass	(France) Jacques Brugnon	(United States) Frank Hunter (United States) Bill Tilden	6–1, 6–4, 6–8, 3–6, 4–6
Loss	1928	French Championships	Clay	(France) René de Buzelet	(France) Jean Borotra (France) Jacques Brugnon	4–6, 6–3, 2–6, 6–3, 4–6
Win	1928	Wimbledon	Grass	(France) Jacques Brugnon	(Australia) John Hawkes (Australia) Gerald Patterson	13–11, 6–4, 6–4
Loss	1929	French Championships	Clay	(France) Jacques Brugnon	(France) Jean Borotra (France) René Lacoste	3–6, 6–3, 3–6, 6–3, 6–8
Win	1930	French Championships	Clay	(France) Jacques Brugnon	(Australia) Harry Hopman (Australia) James Willard	6–3, 9–7, 6–3
Loss	1931	Wimbledon	Grass	(France) Jacques Brugnon	(United States) George Lott (United States) John Van Ryn	2–6, 8–10, 11–9, 6–3, 3–6
Win	1932	French Championships	Clay	(France) Jacques Brugnon	(France) Christian Boussus (France) Marcel Bernard	6–4, 3–6, 7–5, 6–3

=== Mixed Doubles: 5 (3 titles, 2 runners-up) ===
Result	Year	Championship	Surface	Partner	Opponents	Score
Loss	1925	French Championships	Clay	(France) Julie Vlasto	(France) Suzanne Lenglen (France) Jacques Brugnon	2–6, 2–6
Win	1927	U.S. National Championships	Grass	(United Kingdom) Eileen Bennett	(United States) Hazel Hotchkiss Wightman (France) René Lacoste	6–2, 0–6, 6–3
Win	1928	French Championships	Clay	(United Kingdom) Eileen Bennett	(United States) Helen Wills (United States) Frank Hunter	3–6, 6–3, 6–3
Win	1929	French Championships	Clay	(United Kingdom) Eileen Bennett	(United States) Helen Wills (United States) Frank Hunter	6–3, 6–2
Loss	1930	French Championships	Clay	(United Kingdom) Eileen Bennett Whittingstall	(Germany) Cilly Aussem (United States) Bill Tilden	4–6, 4–6

== World Championship finals ==
=== Singles (3) ===
Result	Year	Championship	Surface	Opponent	Score
Win	1922	World Hard Court Championships	Clay	(Spain) Manuel de Gomar	6–0, 2–6, 4–6, 6–1, 6–2
Win	1922	World Covered Court Championships	Wood	(France) Jean Borotra	4–6, 2–6, 6–3, 6–2, 6–0
Win	1923	World Covered Court Championships	Wood	(United Kingdom) John B. Gilbert	6–4, 7–5, 6–4

=== Doubles (3) ===
Result	Year	Championship	Surface	Partner	Opponents	Score
Win	1922	World Hard Court Championships	Clay	(France) Jean Borotra	(Romania) Nicolae Mişu (France) Marcel Dupont	6–8, 6–1, 6–2, 6–3
Win	1922	World Covered Court Championships	Wood	(France) Jean Borotra	(Switzerland) Charles Martin (Switzerland) Arman C. Simon	2–6, 6–2, 6–1, 6–4
Win	1923	World Covered Court Championships	Wood	(France) Jean Couiteas	(Denmark) Leif Rovsing (Denmark) Erik Tegner	6–1, 6–1, 7–5

=== Mixed doubles (2) ===
Result	Year	Championship	Surface	Partner	Opponents	Score
Win	1922	World Hard Court Championships	Clay	(France) Suzanne Lenglen	(United Kingdom) Geraldine Beamish (United Kingdom) John Gilbert	6–4, 4–6, 6–0
Win	1923	World Hard Court Championships	Clay	(France) Suzanne Lenglen	(United Kingdom) Kitty McKane Godfree (United Kingdom) John Gilbert	6–2, 10–8

== Pro Slam finals ==
French Pro

- Singles champion: 1936
- Singles runner-up: 1937

== Singles performance timeline ==
Cochet was banned from competing in the amateur Grand Slams when he joined the professional tennis circuit in 1933.

Key
W	F	SF	QF	#R	RR	Q#	P#	DNQ	A	Z#	PO	G	S	B	NMS	NTI	P	NH

(W) winner; (F) finalist; (SF) semifinalist; (QF) quarterfinalist; (#R) rounds 4, 3, 2, 1; (RR) round-robin stage; (Q#) qualification round; (P#) preliminary round; (DNQ) did not qualify; (A) absent; (Z#) Davis/Fed Cup Zonal Group (with number indication) or (PO) play-off; (G) gold, (S) silver or (B) bronze Olympic/Paralympic medal; (NMS) not a Masters tournament; (NTI) not a Tier I tournament; (P) postponed; (NH) not held; (SR) strike rate (events won / competed); (W–L) win–loss record.

(OF) only for French players

	1922	1923	1924	1925	1926	1927	1928	1929	1930	1931	1932	1933	1934	1935	1936	1937	1938	1939	1940	SR	W–L	Win %
Grand Slam tournaments																				7 / 22	97–15	86.6
Australian Open	A	A	A	A	A	A	A	A	A	A	A	A	A	A	A	A	A	A	A	0 / 0	–	–
French Open	OF			QF	W	SF	W	SF	W	A	W	F	A	A	A	A	A	A	NH	4 / 8	37–4	90.2
Wimbledon	4R	A	A	SF	SF	W	F	W	QF	1R	2R	SF	A	A	A	A	A	A	NH	2 / 10	43–8	84.3
US Open	A	A	A	A	SF	3R	W	A	A	A	F	A	A	A	A	A	A	A	A	1 / 4	17–3	85.0
Pro Slam tournaments																				1 / 4	9–3	75.0
U.S. Pro	Not held					A	A	A	A	A	A	A	A	A	A	A	A	A	A	0 / 0	–	–
French Pro	Not held								A	A	A	NH	A	A	W	F	A	QF	NH	1 / 3	8–2	80.0
Wembley Pro	Not held												A	A	NH	SF	NH	A	NH	0 / 1	1–1	50.0
Win–loss	3–1	0–0	0–0	8–2	15–2	12–2	18–1	11–1	8–1	0–1	12–2	10–2	0–0	0–0	4–0	4–2	0–0	1–1	0–0	8 / 26	106–18	85.5
National representation
Olympics	NH		S	Not held																0 / 1	4–1	80.0

== See also ==
- All-time tennis records – men's singles
- List of Grand Slam men's singles champions

== Notes ==
- ^{a} All world rankings refer to A Wallis Myers' from this point on unless otherwise noted.
- ^{b} ^{c} Based upon the official year-end French rankings compiled by the Fédération Française de Tennis, Jacques Brugnon and Christian Boussus shared a joint fourth-fifth place while Emmanuel du Plaix and Pierre Henri Landry were ranked similarly sixth-seventh.
