= 1932 French Championships – Men's singles =

Men's singles
- 1932 French Championships

Final
- Champion: (France) Henri Cochet
- Runner-up: (Italy) Giorgio de Stefani
- Score: 6–0, 6–4, 4–6, 6–3

Details
- Seeds: 16

Events
Singles	men	women
Doubles	men	women
← 1931 ·	French Championships	· 1933 →

Henri Cochet defeated Giorgio de Stefani 6–0, 6–4, 4–6, 6–3 in the final to win the men's singles tennis title at the 1932 French Championships.

== Seeds ==
The seeded players are listed below. Henri Cochet is the champion; others show the round in which they were eliminated.

1. (France) Henri Cochet (champion)
2. (United Kingdom) Fred Perry (quarterfinals)
3. (United States) Sidney Wood (third round)
4. (Japan) Jiro Satoh (fourth round)
5. (France) Christian Boussus (fourth round)
6. (Italy) Giorgio de Stefani (finalist)
7. (Czechoslovakia) Roderich Menzel (semifinals)
8. (United States) Gregory Mangin (quarterfinals)
9. (France) Paul Féret (third round)
10. (France) Jacques Brugnon (fourth round)
11. (France) André Merlin (third round)
12. (Republic of Ireland) George Rogers Lyttelton (quarterfinals)
13. (France) Marcel Bernard (semifinals)
14. (Germany) Gottfried von Cramm (second round)
15. (Austria) Franz Matejka (fourth round)
16. (United Kingdom) Patrick Hughes (fourth round)

== Draw ==
=== Key ===
- Q = Qualifier
- WC = Wild card
- LL = Lucky loser
- r = Retired

=== Finals ===
Quarterfinals
1	(France) Henri Cochet	6	7	5	6
8	(United States) Gregory Mangin	3	5	7	3
13	(France) Marcel Bernard	6	6	6	3	6
12	(Republic of Ireland) George Lyttleton-Rogers	4	8	4	6	2
6	(Italy) Giorgio de Stefani	6	9	6
(United Kingdom) Harry Lee	3	7	2
7	(Czechoslovakia) Roderich Menzel	2	6	1	6	7
2	(United Kingdom) Fred Perry	6	1	6	3	5

Semifinals
1	(France) Henri Cochet	6	6	6
13	(France) Marcel Bernard	4	0	4
6	(Italy) Giorgio de Stefani	6	2	7	6
7	(Czechoslovakia) Roderich Menzel	3	6	5	4

Final
1	(France) Henri Cochet	6	6	4	6
6	(Italy) Giorgio de Stefani	0	4	6	3

=== Earlier rounds ===
==== Section 1 ====
First round

Second round
1	(France) Cochet	6	6	6
(France) Arago	4	4	0
(Italy) Del Bono	8	5	6	6	6
(France) Guillemot	10	7	3	1	3
16	(United Kingdom) Hughes
(France) Albarran
(Switzerland) Fisher
(France) Rimet

Third round
1	(France) Cochet	6	7	6
(Italy) Del Bono	3	5	1
16	(United Kingdom) Hughes	6	6	6
(France) Rimet	4	3	1

Fourth round
1	(France) Cochet	6	6	4	6
16	(United Kingdom) Hughes	4	3	6	4

==== Section 2 ====
First round
(United Kingdom) Avory	6	6	3	6
(France) Poulailion	2	1	6	1
(Monaco) Galeppe
(Japan) Kuwabara

Second round
8	(United States) Mangin	6	6	6
(France) Glasser	3	2	1
(France) Du Plaix	6	6	6
(Belgium) De Borman	2	3	2
9	(France) Féret
(India) Jagat-Mohan
(United Kingdom) Avory	6	8	6	1	5
(Japan) Kuwabara	3	6	8	6	7

Third round
8	(United States) Mangin	6	6	6
(France) Du Plaix	3	4	4
9	(France) Féret	1	6	3
(Japan) Kuwabara	6	8	6

Fourth round
8	(United States) Mangin	7	6	6
(Japan) Kuwabara	5	4	3

==== Section 3 ====
First round
4	(Japan) Satoh	6	6	6
(France) Roche	2	2	4
(France) Piel	6	4	6	0	6
(Denmark) Plougmann	4	6	4	6	3
(France) Joba
(United Kingdom) Olliff
(France) Berthet
(France) Lotan
13	(France) Bernard
Gallet
(Switzerland) Chiesa
(Belgium) Van Zuylen
(Austria) Artens	6	6	6
(France) Terrier	2	3	4
(France) Rodel
(Germany) Kleinschroth

Second round
4	(Japan) Satoh	6	6	3	6
(France) Piel	4	4	6	4
(United Kingdom) Olliff	6	6	6
(France) Lotan	2	1	1
13	(France) Bernard	8	6	4	6	6
(Belgium) Van Zuylen	10	4	6	4	2
(Austria) Artens	6	6	8
(France) Rodel	4	4	6

Third round
4	(Japan) Satoh	6	7	3	6
(United Kingdom) Olliff	3	5	6	3
13	(France) Bernard	6	3	3	6	6
(Austria) Artens	4	6	6	2	4

Fourth round
4	(Japan) Satoh	6	0	6	1
13	(France) Bernard	3	6	8	6

==== Section 4 ====
First round
5	(France) Boussus	6	6	7
(Czechoslovakia) Siba	2	3	5
(France) Couiteas
(Kingdom of Yugoslavia) Schäffer
(Netherlands) Timmer	6	6	6
(France) Gerbault	1	2	2
(France) Grandguillot	6	6	6
(France) Augustin	4	0	4
12	(Republic of Ireland) Rogers Lyttelton	6	5	8	6	6
(France) Magaloff	3	7	10	3	4
(France) Samazeuilh
(Czechoslovakia) Hecht
(Italy) Palmieri	6	6	10
(France) Laurent	1	4	8
(France) Goldschmidt
(Austria) Salm

Second round
5	(France) Boussus
(France) Couiteas
(Netherlands) Timmer
(France) Grandguillot
12	(Republic of Ireland) Rogers Lyttelton	1	7	10
(France) Samazeuilh	6	5	8	r
(Italy) Palmieri	6	6	6
(Austria) Salm	1	4	2

Third round
5	(France) Boussus	5	6	6	6
(France) Grandguillot	7	3	3	1
12	(Republic of Ireland) Rogers Lyttelton	6	3	2	7	7
(Italy) Palmieri	3	6	6	5	5

Fourth round
5	(France) Boussus	7	3	2	5
12	(Republic of Ireland) Rogers Lyttelton	5	6	6	7

==== Section 5 ====
First round
(Belgium) Lacroix	2	3	4
(France) Grandguillot	6	6	6
(France) Aron
(Hungary) Von Kehrling
(Denmark) Sperling	4	2	1
(Monaco) Landau	6	6	6
(India) Singh	0	0	0
11	(France) Merlin	6	6	6
Datt	1	0	3
(France) Martin-Legeay	6	6	6
(France) Mital	3	6	4
(United Kingdom) David	6	8	6
(Czechoslovakia) Marsalek	2	4	7	6	2
(France) Aslangul	6	6	5	2	6
(France) Leven	1	0	3
6	(Italy) de Stefani	6	6	6

Second round
(France) Grandguillot	2	2	2
(Hungary) Von Kehrling	6	6	6
(Monaco) Landau	7	5	1	2
11	(France) Merlin	5	7	6	6
(France) Martin-Legeay	8	6	6
(United Kingdom) David	6	2	3
(France) Aslangul	2	1	6	3
6	(Italy) de Stefani	6	6	3	6

Third round
(Hungary) von Kehrling	6	9	6
11	(France) Merlin	1	7	3
(France) Martin-Legeay	3	7	1
6	(Italy) de Stefani	6	9	6

Fourth round
(Hungary) von Kehrling	4	7	4
6	(Italy) de Stefani	6	9	6

==== Section 6 ====
First round
(Kingdom of Yugoslavia) Kukuljević
(France) Landry
(France) Vieillard	4	2	3
(United Kingdom) Lee	6	6	6
(Italy) Sertorio	3	3	6	8	8
(France) Bernard	6	6	1	6	6
(France) Desloges	0	6	3	8
14	(Germany) von Cramm	6	3	6	10
(France) Siguier	9	1	2	1
(Russia) Rodzianko	7	6	6	6
(Czechoslovakia) Krasny	3	1	6	0
(France) Lacoste	6	6	0	6
(France) Journu	6	4	6	9
(Switzerland) Aeschliman	3	6	2	7
(France) Combemale	4	6	2	2
3	(United States) Wood	6	3	6	6

Second round
(France) Landry	4	4	4
(United Kingdom) Lee	6	6	6
(Italy) Sertorio
14	(Germany) von Cramm
(Russia) Rodzianko	1	3	6	6	1
(France) Lacoste	6	6	4	3	6
(France) Journu	3	2	6	1
3	(United States) Wood	6	6	3	6

Third round
(United Kingdom) Lee	2	6	6	6
(Italy) Sertorio	6	4	3	1
(France) Lacoste	6	6	3	6	7
3	(United States) Wood	0	1	6	8	5

Fourth round
(United Kingdom) Lee	6	6	4	7
(France) Lacoste	2	4	6	5

==== Section 7 ====
First round
(Egypt) Wahid
(France) Gajan
(France) Douillet
(United Kingdom) Collins

Second round
(France) Gajan
(France) Douillet
De	1	1	2
10	(France) Brugnon	6	6	6
(Italy) de Minerbi	2	5	2
(France) Bonte	6	7	6
(France) Troncin	4	7	1	6
7	(Czechoslovakia) Menzel	6	5	6	8

Third round
(France) Gajan	4	3	1
10	(France) Brugnon	6	6	6
(France) Bonte	2	4	8	2
7	(Czechoslovakia) Menzel	6	6	6	6

Fourth round
10	(France) Brugnon	6	4	4
7	(Czechoslovakia) Menzel	8	6	6

==== Section 8 ====
First round

Second round
(France) De Buzelet	6	7	4	1	7
(Japan) Miki	1	5	6	6	5
(France) Goldryn	6	3	2	2
15	(Austria) Matejka	3	6	6	6
(Hungary) Zichy	3	4	2
(France) Gentien	6	6	6
(France) Contanson	2	3	3
2	(United Kingdom) Perry	6	6	6

Third round
(France) De Buzelet	1	8	4	0
15	(Austria) Matejka	6	6	6	6
(France) Gentien	12	6	2	2
2	(United Kingdom) Perry	14	4	6	6

Fourth round
15	(Austria) Matejka	2	4	4
2	(United Kingdom) Perry	6	6	6

Preceded by 1932 Australian Championships – Men's singles	Grand Slam men's singles	Succeeded by 1932 Wimbledon Championships – Men's singles
