= 1927 French Championships – Men's singles =

Men's singles
- 1927 French Championships

Final
- Champion: (France) René Lacoste
- Runner-up: (United States) Bill Tilden
- Score: 6–4, 4–6, 5–7, 6–3, 11–9

Details
- Draw: 75
- Seeds: 16

Events
Singles	men	women		boys	girls
Doubles	men	women	mixed	boys	girls
← 1926 ·	French Championships	· 1928 →

First-seeded René Lacoste defeated Bill Tilden 6–4, 4–6, 5–7, 6–3, 11–9 in the final to win the men's singles tennis title at the 1927 French Championships. The draw consisted of 75 player of which 16 were seeded.

== Seeds ==
The seeded players are listed below. René Lacoste is the champion; others show the round in which they were eliminated.

1. (France) René Lacoste (champion)
2. (France) Henri Cochet (semifinals)
3. (United States) Bill Tilden (finalist)
4. (France) Jean Borotra (fourth round)
5. (United States) Frank Hunter (third round)
6. (South Africa) Louis Raymond (quarterfinals)
7. (Hungary) Béla von Kehrling (fourth round)
8. (France) Jacques Brugnon (quarterfinals)
9. (Romania) Nicolas Mishu (fourth round)
10. (Germany) Otto Froitzheim (quarterfinals)
11. (India) Sri Krishna Prasada (fourth round)
12. (United Kingdom) Keats Lester (fourth round)
13. (South Africa) Patrick Spence (semifinals)
14. (Switzerland) Charles F. Aeschliman (fourth round)
15. (Netherlands) Hendrik Timmer (fourth round)
16. (Poland) Stanisław Czetwertyński (fourth round)

== Draw ==
=== Key ===
- Q = Qualifier
- WC = Wild card
- LL = Lucky loser
- r = Retired

=== Finals ===
Quarterfinals
1	(France) René Lacoste	6	6	5	6
8	(France) Jacques Brugnon	4	4	7	3
(France) Antoine Gentien	2	6	4	3
13	(South Africa) Patrick Spence	6	3	6	6
6	(South Africa) Louis Raymond	7	2	6	3
3	(United States) Bill Tilden	5	6	8	6
10	(Germany) Otto Froitzheim	1	1	4
2	(France) Henri Cochet	6	6	6

Semifinals
1	(France) René Lacoste	6	6	6
13	(South Africa) Patrick Spence	1	3	2
3	(United States) Bill Tilden	9	6	6
2	(France) Henri Cochet	7	3	2

Final
1	(France) René Lacoste	6	4	5	6	11
3	(United States) Bill Tilden	4	6	7	3	9

=== Earlier rounds ===
==== Section 1 ====
First round

Second round
1	(France) Lacoste	6	6	6
(France) George	2	4	3
(Germany) Kleinschroth	5	3	6	6	6
(Switzerland) Wuarin	7	6	1	1	2
(Switzerland) Chiesa	0	1	0
16	(Poland) Czetwertyński	6	6	6
De Klazkowski	0	r
(France) Piel	6

Third round
1	(France) Lacoste	6	6	6
(Germany) Kleinschroth	2	1	3
16	(Poland) Czetwertyński	2	6	0	6	6
(France) Piel	6	2	6	4	1

Fourth round
1	(France) Lacoste	6	8	6
16	(Poland) Czetwertyński	3	6	3

==== Section 2 ====
First round

Second round
8	(France) Brugnon	6	6	6
(Spain) Garriga Nogues	2	0	4
(Austria) Artens
(France) Samazeuilh
9	(Romania) Mishu	6	3	6	6	6
(Austria) Salm	2	6	3	2	2
(France) Broquedis	6	6	10
(France) Micard	2	0	8

Third round
8	(France) Brugnon	6	4	6	6
(France) Samazeuilh	1	6	0	2
9	(Romania) Mishu	4	7	6	6
(France) Broquedis	6	5	1	4

Fourth round
8	(France) Brugnon	6	6
9	(Romania) Mishu	2	0	r

==== Section 3 ====
First round

Second round
4	(France) Borotra	6	3	6	6
(Denmark) Thalbitzer	4	6	0	1
(Netherlands) Van Lennep	6	6	6
(New Zealand) Fisher	1	1	0
(France) Du Plaix	6	8	6
(Chile) Torralva-Ponsa	2	6	3
(France) Gentien	3	9	6	6
(France) Laurent	6	7	3	2

Third round
4	(France) Borotra	7	6	6
(Netherlands) Van Lennep	9	4	4	r
(France) Du Plaix	6	2	3	r
(France) Gentien	4	6	6

Fourth round
4	(France) Borotra	2	11	0	4
(France) Gentien	6	9	6	6

==== Section 4 ====
First round
13	(South Africa) Spence	6	2	6	3	6
(Egypt) Wahid	1	6	4	6	0
(France) Landry	6	5	r
(United States) Van Alen	3	7
12	(United Kingdom) Lester	6	6	6
(France) Bernard	3	4	4
(United States) Wood	0	8	2	6	6
(France) Barrelet De Ricou	6	6	6	3	4
(Spain) Flaquer	4	5	6	3
(South Africa) Condon	6	7	2	6

Second round
5	(United States) Hunter	6	6	6
(France) Persin	4	3	2
(France) Aron	6	2	6	5	7
13	(South Africa) Spence	3	6	4	7	9
(United States) Van Alen	2	3	6	8	7
12	(United Kingdom) Lester	6	6	2	6	9
(United States) Wood	3	1	4
(South Africa) Condon	6	6	6

Third round
5	(United States) Hunter	6	6	1	3	2
13	(South Africa) Spence	3	2	6	6	6
12	(United Kingdom) Lester	7	6	3	6	6
(South Africa) Condon	5	8	6	3	4

Fourth round
13	(South Africa) Spence	6	2	6	6
12	(United Kingdom) Lester	4	6	3	3

==== Section 5 ====
First round
(France) Thurneyssen	3	3	4
(Germany) Wetzel	6	6	6
Krishen
(Chile) Torralva-Ponsa
(France) De Buzelet	7	3	6	6
(Egypt) Danon	5	6	3	3
11	(India) Prasada	6	6	6
(France) Laurent	1	2	2
(France) Siguier	6	6	7
(India) Fyzee	4	3	5
(Kingdom of Yugoslavia) Dungyersky	3	9	6	2
(France) Boussus	6	7	1	6

Second round
(Germany) Wetzel	6	4	2	6	4
(Chile) Torralva-Ponsa	4	6	6	2	6
(France) De Buzelet	6	2	4	1
11	(India) Prasada	2	6	6	6
(France) Siguier	1	2	2
(France) Boussus	6	6	6
(France) Danet	5	0	2
6	(South Africa) Raymond	7	6	6

Third round
(Chile) Torralva-Ponsa	3	7	1	0
11	(India) Prasada	6	5	6	6
(France) Boussus	6	1	6	4	2
6	(South Africa) Raymond	3	6	3	6	6

Fourth round
11	(India) Prasada	2	2	1
6	(South Africa) Raymond	6	6	6

==== Section 6 ====
First round

Second round
(France) Augustin	5	1	4
14	(Switzerland) Aeschliman	7	6	6
(Greece) Papadopoulos
(Poland) Kleinadel
(France) Rodel	6	6	10
(United States) Biddle	1	2	8
(Spain) Andreu	2	2	0
3	(United States) Tilden	6	6	6

Third round
14	(Switzerland) Aeschliman
(Poland) Kleinadel
(France) Rodel	2	1	1
3	(United States) Tilden	6	6	6

Fourth round
14	(Switzerland) Aeschliman	1	1	5
3	(United States) Tilden	6	6	7

==== Section 7 ====
First round

Second round
(Spain) Carreras	1	1	0
10	(Germany) Froitzheim	6	6	6
(United Kingdom) Turnbull	6	6	6
(France) Le Blant	4	4	2
(Russia) Rodzianko	6	8	6	10
(France) Guillemot	4	6	3	8
(France) Rebois	1	1	1	r
7	(Hungary) Von Kehrling	6	6	4

Third round
10	(Germany) Froitzheim	6	4	6	6
(United Kingdom) Turnbull	3	6	4	0
(Russia) Rodzianko	2	3	4
7	(Hungary) Von Kehrling	6	6	6

Fourth round
10	(Germany) Froitzheim	6	10	6
7	(Hungary) Von Kehrling	2	8	3

==== Section 8 ====
First round

Second round
(France) Geraud	6	1	6	6
(United Kingdom) Hillyard	2	6	3	2
15	(Netherlands) Timmer	6	6	2	6
(France) Arago	3	2	6	3
(France) Champin
(South Africa) Farquharson
(Indonesia) Sarkies	2	2	0
2	(France) Cochet	6	6	6

Third round
(France) Geraud	5	4	3
15	(Netherlands) Timmer	7	6	6
(France) Champin
2	(France) Cochet

Fourth round
15	(Netherlands) Timmer	8	11	3	4	5
2	(France) Cochet	6	9	6	6	7

Preceded by 1927 Australian Championships – Men's singles	Grand Slam men's singles	Succeeded by 1927 Wimbledon Championships – Men's singles
