= 1929 Wimbledon Championships – Men's singles =

Men's singles
- 1929 Wimbledon Championships

Final
- Champion: (France) Henri Cochet
- Runner-up: (France) Jean Borotra
- Score: 6–4, 6–3, 6–4

Details
- Draw: 128 (10Q)
- Seeds: 8

Events
Singles	men	women		boys	girls
Doubles	men	women	mixed	boys	girls
- Wimbledon Championships

Henri Cochet defeated Jean Borotra 6–4, 6–3, 6–4 in the final to win the gentlemen's singles tennis title at the 1929 Wimbledon Championships. René Lacoste was the defending champion, but did not participate.

== Seeds ==
1. (France) Henri Cochet (champion)
2. (France) Jean Borotra (final)
3. (United States) Bill Tilden (semifinals)
4. (United States) Frank Hunter (second round)
5. (Italy) Uberto de Morpurgo (third round)
6. (United States) George Lott (quarterfinals)
7. (Hungary) Béla von Kehrling (quarterfinals)
8. (United Kingdom) Colin Gregory (fourth round)

Click on the seed number of a player to go to their draw section.

== Draw ==
Key

- Q = Qualifier
- WC = Wild card
- LL = Lucky loser
- Alt = Alternate
- ITF = ITF entry
- PR = Protected ranking
- SR = Special ranking
- SE = Special exempt
- JE = Junior exempt
- JR = Junior Accelerator Programme entrant
- CO = College Accelerator Programme entrant
- NG = Next Gen Accelerator Program entrant
- w/o = Walkover
- r = Retired
- d = Defaulted

=== Finals ===
Quarterfinals
1	(France) Henri Cochet	6	7	6
(Netherlands) Hendrik Timmer	4	5	2
3	(United States) Bill Tilden	6	2	6	7
(France) Pierre Henri Landry	4	6	3	5
2	(France) Jean Borotra	6	6	6
6	(United States) George Lott	3	3	4
(United Kingdom) Bunny Austin	6	8	6
7	(Hungary) Béla von Kehrling	2	6	3

Semifinals
1	(France) Henri Cochet	6	6	7
3	(United States) Bill Tilden	4	1	5
2	(France) Jean Borotra	6	10	5	6
(United Kingdom) Bunny Austin	1	8	7	1

Final
1	(France) Henri Cochet	6	6	6
2	(France) Jean Borotra	4	3	4

=== Top half ===
==== Section 1 ====
First round
1	(France) Henri Cochet	6	6	6
(United Kingdom) Tony Crossley	3	4	3
(India) Hassan Ali Fyzee	3	6	6	7	6
(United Kingdom) Kenneth Gandar-Dower	6	4	4	9	8
(Republic of Ireland) George Lyttleton-Rogers	6	7	6
Q	(United Kingdom) Jack Lysaght	3	5	3
(United Kingdom) William Powell	6	6	4	6
(United Kingdom) Harvey Mackintosh	1	4	6	4
(United Kingdom) David Williams	6	6	6
(Sweden) Curt Östberg	3	4	4
(United Kingdom) Stan Harris	6	7	6
(United Kingdom) JH Frowen	4	5	2
(United States) John Hennessey	6	6	6
(South Africa) Roy Malcolm	3	0	3
(Spain) Francisco Sindreu	w/o
(United Kingdom) Roger Worthington

Second round
1	(France) H Cochet	6	6	4	6
(United Kingdom) K Gandar-Dower	4	4	6	4
(Republic of Ireland) G Lyttleton-Rogers	3	6	6	7
(United Kingdom) W Powell	6	1	4	5
(United Kingdom) D Williams	4	2	3
(United Kingdom) JH Frowen	6	6	6
(United States) J Hennessey	6	6	6
(United Kingdom) R Worthington	4	4	3

Third round
1	(France) H Cochet	5	6	9	4	6
(Republic of Ireland) G Lyttleton-Rogers	7	0	7	6	3
(United Kingdom) JH Frowen	2	1	5
(United States) J Hennessey	6	6	7

Fourth round
1	(France) H Cochet	6	6	9
(United States) J Hennessey	1	4	7

==== Section 2 ====
First round
5	(Italy) Uberto de Morpurgo	6	6	6
(United Kingdom) GR Ashton	3	0	0
(Germany) Hans Moldenhauer	6	6	6
(United Kingdom) RG Bernard	1	2	4
(United Kingdom) Nigel Sharpe	6	6	3	6
(United Kingdom) Ian Collins	2	1	6	2
(Republic of Ireland) Noel Holmes	2	6	2	1
(United Kingdom) Jack Chamberlain	6	4	6	6
(Denmark) Einer Ulrich	7	9	6
(Republic of Ireland) Henry Purcell	5	7	1
(France) René de Buzelet	6	0	5	6	7
Q	(United Kingdom) Arthur Vinall	0	6	7	1	5
(Greece) Costas Efstratiadis	2	2	3
(United Kingdom) Jack Hillyard	6	6	6
(United States) Bill Lingelbach	0	2	3
(Netherlands) Hendrik Timmer	6	6	6

Second round
5	(Italy) H de Morpurgo	3	6	6	2	6
(Germany) H Moldenhauer	6	4	3	6	4
(United Kingdom) N Sharpe	6	7	7
(United Kingdom) J Chamberlain	2	5	5
(Denmark) E Ulrich	6	5	0	4
(France) R de Buzelet	4	7	6	6
(United Kingdom) J Hillyard	3	0	2
(Netherlands) H Timmer	6	6	6

Third round
5	(Italy) H de Morpurgo	2	4	6	3
(United Kingdom) N Sharpe	6	6	4	6
(France) R de Buzelet	6	6	3	2	3
(Netherlands) H Timmer	2	4	6	6	6

Fourth round
(United Kingdom) N Sharpe	1	6	0	9
(Netherlands) H Timmer	6	3	6	11

==== Section 3 ====
First round
3	(United States) Bill Tilden	6	6	6
(Republic of Ireland) Shirley Dillon	1	1	2
(Czechoslovakia) Roderich Menzel	6	6	6	6	3
(United Kingdom) Craig Campbell	3	4	8	8	6
(United Kingdom) Eric Peters	4	3	6	3
(Italy) Alberto del Bono	6	6	4	6
(United Kingdom) Herman David	2	2	3
(Germany) Daniel Prenn	6	6	6
(United States) Wilbur Coen	2	9	6	6
(Canada) Jack Wright	6	7	4	2
(South Africa) Colin Robbins	6	6	6
(Germany) Eberhard Nourney	4	4	4
(France) Christian Boussus	4	6	6	6
(United Kingdom) Norman Latchford	6	0	0	3
(United Kingdom) Victor Cazalet	3	6	2	6	2
(United Kingdom) Gordon Crole-Rees	6	3	6	4	6

Second round
3	(United States) W Tilden	6	6	6
(United Kingdom) C Campbell	1	2	0
(Italy) A del Bono	3	4	1
(Germany) D Prenn	6	6	6
(United States) W Coen	6	6	7	6
(South Africa) C Robbins	1	1	9	1
(France) C Boussus	6	6	6
(United Kingdom) G Crole-Rees	4	4	3

Third round
3	(United States) W Tilden	6	6	8
(Germany) D Prenn	0	0	6
(United States) W Coen	1	8	5
(France) C Boussus	6	10	7

Fourth round
3	(United States) W Tilden	6	9	6
(France) C Boussus	3	7	4

==== Section 4 ====
First round
8	(United Kingdom) Colin Gregory	4	6	6	7
(United Kingdom) Keats Lester	6	3	3	5
(United Kingdom) Frank Wilde	w/o
(United Kingdom) Leighton Crawford
(France) Raymond Rodel	6	6	4	6
(United Kingdom) Brian Helmore	4	3	6	2
(Germany) Fritz Kuhlmann
(United Kingdom) Leslie Godfree	w/o
(New Zealand) Buster Andrews	6	6	6
(Hungary) Pál Leiner	1	1	0
(Austria) Ludwig von Salm-Hoogstraeten	4	0	0
(France) Pierre Henri Landry	6	6	6
(Belgium) André Lacroix	6	1	6	2	3
(Japan) Yoshiro Ohta	4	6	2	6	6
(United Kingdom) Alan Brown	4	1	5
(United Kingdom) Harry Lee	6	6	7

Second round
8	(United Kingdom) C Gregory	1	6	6	6
(United Kingdom) FRL Crawford	6	0	1	2
(France) R Rodel	6	6	6	6
(Germany) F Kuhlmann	4	8	2	1
(New Zealand) E Andrews	6	5	0	1
(France) PH Landry	4	7	6	6
(Japan) Y Ohta	7	4	4	5
(United Kingdom) H Lee	5	6	6	7

Third round
8	(United Kingdom) C Gregory	2	6	6	6
(France) R Rodel	6	2	4	0
(France) PH Landry	5	4	6	6	6
(United Kingdom) H Lee	7	6	4	2	3

Fourth round
8	(United Kingdom) C Gregory	6	4	6	3
(France) PH Landry	8	6	3	6

=== Bottom half ===
==== Section 5 ====
First round
2	(France) Jean Borotra	6	6	6
(South Africa) Gerald Sherwell	4	4	4
(United Kingdom) Billy Collins	6	6	8
(United Kingdom) Frank Jarvis	1	3	6
(India) Syed Mohammad Hadi	2	1	4
(United Kingdom) Noel Turnbull	6	6	6
(South Africa) Norman Farquharson	8	1	2	6	2
(United Kingdom) Pat Hughes	6	6	6	2	6
(Hungary) Imre Takáts	4	2	3
(United Kingdom) Patrick Wheatley	6	6	6
Q	(United Kingdom) Colin Higgins	5	6	7	6
(United Kingdom) DH Balfour	7	2	5	2
(United Kingdom) Guy Cooper	6	6	6
Q	(India) Harish Dhanda	2	2	2
(United States) Bud Chandler	6	3	3	3
(United States) Wilmer Allison	2	6	6	6

Second round
2	(France) J Borotra	6	6	6
(United Kingdom) W Collins	3	4	2
(United Kingdom) N Turnbull	1	6	7	6
(United Kingdom) P Hughes	6	4	5	0
(United Kingdom) P Wheatley	5	6	6	7
Q	(United Kingdom) C Higgins	7	4	3	5
(United Kingdom) G Cooper	3	6	3	2
(United States) W Allison	6	3	6	6

Third round
2	(France) J Borotra	6	6	5	6
(United Kingdom) N Turnbull	2	1	7	4
(United Kingdom) P Wheatley	1	1	1
(United States) W Allison	6	6	6

Fourth round
2	(France) J Borotra	6	6	4	6
(United States) W Allison	3	1	6	3

==== Section 6 ====
First round
6	(United States) George Lott	6	6	6
(France) Emmanuel du Plaix	4	3	2
(Belgium) Léopold de Borman
(Egypt) Jacques Grandguillot	w/o
(Switzerland) Charles Aeschlimann	w/o
(Italy) Leonardo Bonzi
(United Kingdom) Harry Lewis-Barclay	2	1	4
(United Kingdom) Donald Greig	6	6	6
(Spain) Enrique Maier	w/o
Q	(United Kingdom) Henry Burrows
(Romania) Nicolae Mișu	2	4	7	1
(Republic of Ireland) Cecil Campbell	6	6	5	6
(Germany) Walter Dessart	7	0	0	2
(Czechoslovakia) Jan Koželuh	5	6	6	6
(United Kingdom) Brame Hillyard	2	3	6	2
(Greece) Augustos Zerlendis	6	6	4	6

Second round
6	(United States) G Lott	6	6	6
(Belgium) L de Borman	1	1	2
(Italy) L Bonzi	6	6	6
(United Kingdom) D Greig	2	4	3
Q	(United Kingdom) H Burrows	0	1	2
(Republic of Ireland) C Campbell	6	6	6
(Czechoslovakia) J Koželuh	6	6	6	4	6
(Greece) A Zerlendis	4	4	8	6	3

Third round
6	(United States) G Lott	6	6	6
(Italy) L Bonzi	1	0	3
(Republic of Ireland) C Campbell	3	4	2
(Czechoslovakia) J Koželuh	6	6	6

Fourth round
6	(United States) G Lott	6	6	6
(Czechoslovakia) J Koželuh	4	1	4

==== Section 7 ====
First round
4	(United States) Frank Hunter	6	7	6
(Japan) Ryuki Miki	1	5	3
(United Kingdom) Brian Gilbert	6	3	2	4
(United Kingdom) Bunny Austin	3	6	6	6
(France) Jacques Brugnon	0	7	6	7
Q	(United Kingdom) John Shales	6	5	1	5
(France) Antoine Gentien	2	0	2
(United States) John Van Ryn	6	6	6
(Germany) Karl Wetzel	6	6	6
(United Kingdom) FR Price	1	2	2
Q	(United Kingdom) Arthur Smith	6	6	6	4	1
Q	(United Kingdom) DR Fussell	8	4	3	6	6
(Austria) Franz Matejka	6	3	3	2
(United Kingdom) Charles Kingsley	4	6	6
(Republic of Ireland) Edward McGuire	6	3	6	4	3
(Germany) Heinrich Kleinschroth	1	6	3	6	6

Second round
4	(United States) F Hunter	3	2	6	3
(United Kingdom) H Austin	6	6	4	6
(France) J Brugnon	1	6	6	6
(United States) J Van Ryn	6	3	2	4
(Germany) K Wetzel	6	6	8
Q	(United Kingdom) DR Fussell	2	2	6
(United Kingdom) C Kingsley	6	6	6
(Germany) H Kleinschroth	1	1	2

Third round
(United Kingdom) H Austin	6	6	6
(France) J Brugnon	3	4	0
(Germany) K Wetzel	3	6	3	0
(United Kingdom) C Kingsley	6	4	6	6

Fourth round
(United Kingdom) H Austin	6	4	6	4	11
(United Kingdom) C Kingsley	2	6	1	6	9

==== Section 8 ====
First round
7	(Hungary) Béla von Kehrling	6	6	6
(United Kingdom) William Radcliffe	2	1	1
Q	(Sweden) Harry Ramberg	3	2	1
(Australia) CS Colvin	6	6	6
(United Kingdom) CL Philcox	1	1	3
(United Kingdom) Randolph Lycett	6	6	6
(United Kingdom) Arthur Lowe	1	3	2
(South Africa) Louis Raymond	6	6	6
Q	(United Kingdom) Fred Perry	7	2	6	3	9
(Italy) Roberto Bocciardo	5	6	4	6	7
(United Kingdom) Norman Dicks	6	6	3	6
(Germany) Friedrich Frenz	3	4	6	4
(France) Georges Glasser	4	6	3	3
(United Kingdom) John Olliff	6	2	6	6
(United Kingdom) Jack Harrison	7	5	6
(Canada) Willard Crocker	9	7	8

Second round
7	(Hungary) B von Kehrling	6	6	6
Q	(Australia) CS Colvin	3	1	4
(United Kingdom) R Lycett	3	3	0
(South Africa) L Raymond	6	6	6
Q	(United Kingdom) F Perry	3	6	6	6
(United Kingdom) N Dicks	6	2	2	4
(United Kingdom) J Olliff	6	6	6
(Canada) W Crocker	2	3	3

Third round
7	(Hungary) B von Kehrling	6	7	6
(South Africa) L Raymond	3	5	3
Q	(United Kingdom) F Perry	4	2	6	3
(United Kingdom) J Olliff	6	6	2	6

Fourth round
7	(Hungary) B von Kehrling	9	7	6
(United Kingdom) J Olliff	7	5	4

Preceded by 1929 French Championships	Grand Slams; Men's Singles	Succeeded by 1929 U.S. Championships
