= Pierre Gillou =

French tennis player, captain and administrator

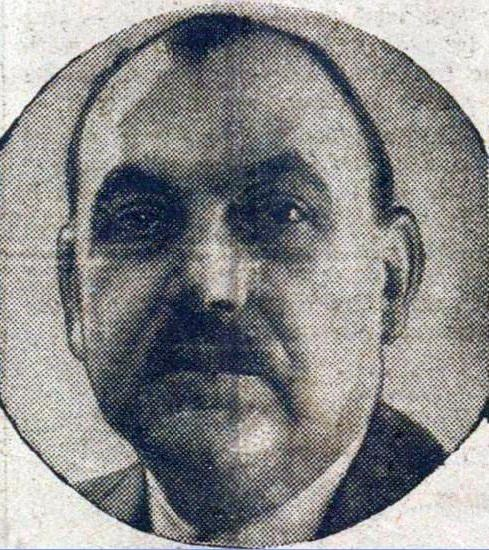
- Gillou in 1941
- Country (sports): France
- Born: 17 September 1880 Paris, France
- Died: 3 January 1953 (aged 72) Paris, France

Pierre Gillou (17 September 1880 – 3 January 1953) was a French tennis player, captain and administrator.

Gillou was the manager and non-playing captain of the French Davis Cup team, consisting of Jean Borotra, Jacques Brugnon, Henri Cochet and René Lacoste, collectively known as the Four Musketeers, who won the Davis Cup in 1927 and successfully defended it from 1928 until 1932.

As a promotor and investor Gillou played an important role in the creation of the Stade Roland Garros which opened in 1928.

He became president of the national French tennis association, Fédération Française de Tennis (FFT) in 1930 after the death of Albert Canet and was also president of the omnisport club Racing Club de France in Paris. At the time of his death in 1953 he was the vice-president of the International Tennis Federation (ITF). From 1953 until 1978 the trophy awarded to the winner of the men's singles at the French Open was called the "Coupe Pierre-Gillou" (Note: In 1978 the trophy was renamed "Coupe des Mousquetaires" in honor of The Four Musketeers.) in his honour.

His annual ranking of the world best tennis players, issued from the early 1930s until his death, was regarded as authoritative.

== Family ==
Gillou was the older brother of Antoinette Gillou and Kate Gillou and an uncle to Antoine Gentien, all tennis players.
