= 1926 French Championships – Men's singles =

Men's singles
- 1926 French Championships

Final
- Champion: (France) Henri Cochet
- Runner-up: (France) René Lacoste
- Score: 6–2, 6–4, 6–3

Details
- Draw: 75
- Seeds: 16

Events
Singles	men	women		boys	girls
Doubles	men	women	mixed	boys	girls
- French Championships

Fourth-seeded Henri Cochet defeated defending champion René Lacoste 6–2, 6–4, 6–3 in the final to win the men's singles tennis title at the 1926 French Championships. The draw consisted of 75 player of which 16 were seeded.

== Seeds ==
The seeded players are listed below. Henri Cochet is the champion; others show the round in which they were eliminated.

1. (United States) Vinnie Richards (semifinals)
2. (France) René Lacoste (finalist)
3. (United States) Howard Kinsey (quarterfinals)
4. (France) Henri Cochet (champion)
5. (Belgium) Jean Washer (quarterfinals)
6. (France) Jean Borotra (semifinals)
7. (Switzerland) Charles F. Aeschliman (fourth round)
8. (India) Athar-Ali Fyzee (second round)
9. (Hungary) Béla Von Kehrling (quarterfinals)
10. (Romania) Nicolae Mișu (quarterfinals)
11. (Netherlands) Hendrik Timmer (second round)
12. (Czechoslovakia) Jan Koželuh (fourth round)
13. (Spain) José María Tejada (fourth round)
14. (France) Léonce Aslangul (fourth round)
15. (Argentina) Guillermo Robson (fourth round)
16. (United Kingdom) J. Colin Gregory (fourth round)

== Draw ==
=== Key ===
- Q = Qualifier
- WC = Wild card
- LL = Lucky loser
- r = Retired

=== Finals ===
Quarterfinals
1	(United States) Vinnie Richards	6	6	6
9	(Hungary) Béla Von Kehrling	1	3	3
4	(France) Henri Cochet	6	3	7	6
5	(Belgium) Jean Washer	4	6	5	4
6	(France) Jean Borotra	2	6	6	3	7
3	(United States) Howard Kinsey	6	4	1	6	5
10	(Romania) Nicolas Mishu	12	1	1
2	(France) René Lacoste	14	6	6

Semifinals
1	(United States) Vinnie Richards	1	4	4
4	(France) Henri Cochet	6	6	6
6	(France) Jean Borotra	6	6	2	4
2	(France) René Lacoste	8	3	6	6

Final
4	(France) Henri Cochet	6	6	6
2	(France) René Lacoste	2	4	3

=== Earlier rounds ===
==== Section 1 ====
First round

Second round
1	(United States) V Richards	6	6	6
(France) P Hirsch	2	3	4
J. A. F. Halkema	4	2	6	0
(Italy) M Balbi Di Robecco	6	6	3	6
(Russia) S Rodzianko	2	6	1	6	4
16	(United Kingdom) J. Colin Gregory	6	4	6	4	6
(France) R Rodel	1	0	1
(Argentina) E Obarrio	6	6	6

Third round
1	(United States) V Richards	6	6	6
(Italy) M Balbi Di Robecco	1	1	1
16	(United Kingdom) J. C Gregory	6	6	6
(Argentina) E Obarrio	1	4	3

Fourth round
1	(United States) V Richards	7	6	6
16	(United Kingdom) J. C Gregory	5	3	2

==== Section 2 ====
First round

Second round
8	(India) A-A Fyzee	2	2	2
(France) P H Landry	6	6	6
(Denmark) B Thalbitzer	3	1	3
(France) J Brugnon	6	6	6
(France) J R Le Besnerais	1	3	7	6
(Netherlands) C Bryan	6	6	5	8
(France) A Aron	2	4	1
9	(Hungary) B Von Kehrling	6	6	6

Third round
(France) P H Landry	6	7	4	2	6
(France) J Brugnon	4	5	6	6	4
(Netherlands) C Bryan
9	(Hungary) B Von Kehrling

Fourth round
(France) P H Landry	3	6	8	4
9	(Hungary) B Von Kehrling	6	1	10	6

==== Section 3 ====
First round

Second round
4	(France) H Cochet	6	6	6
(Argentina) R Boyd	3	2	3
(France) R Danet	6	3	1	7	3
(United Kingdom) L Godfree	4	6	6	5	6
13	(Spain) J M Tejada	6	6	2	6
(Italy) C Colombo	2	1	6	3
(United Kingdom) B Meyer	6	6	1	3	6
(Portugal) R de Castro Pereira	0	4	6	6	1

Third round
4	(France) H Cochet	6	6	6
(United Kingdom) L Godfree	4	2	0
13	(Spain) J M Tejada	6	1	4	6	6
(United Kingdom) B Meyer	1	6	6	4	1

Fourth round
4	(France) H Cochet	6	6	3	6
13	(Spain) J M Tejada	4	3	6	1

==== Section 4 ====
First round
A.H. Greig	6	5	2	5
12	(Czechoslovakia) J Koželuh	3	7	6	7
(Netherlands) G.F. De Bruyn-Kops	6	6	3	4	2
(Italy) D'Avalos	3	4	6	6	6
(Kingdom of Yugoslavia) Đ Dunđerski	7	2	6	6
(Switzerland) H C Fisher	5	6	0	4
(Finland) A Grahn	6	6	6	6
(Poland) E Kleinadel	1	8	3	0
(France) A Gentien	8	3	7	3
5	(Belgium) J Washer	10	6	5	6

Second round
(Netherlands) Van Der Steur	4	2	3
(France) J Samazeuilh	6	6	6
(Canada) D R Morrice	3	4	4
12	(Czechoslovakia) J Koželuh	6	6	6
(Italy) D'Avalos	4	1	5
(Kingdom of Yugoslavia) Đ Dunđerski	6	6	7
(Finland) A Grahn	2	5	2
5	(Belgium) J Washer	6	7	6

Third round
(France) J Samazeuilh	2	6	6	2
12	(Czechoslovakia) J Koželuh	6	8	2	6
(Kingdom of Yugoslavia) Đ Dunđerski	0	6	3
5	(Belgium) J Washer	6	8	6

Fourth round
12	(Czechoslovakia) J Koželuh	6	2	8	3
5	(Belgium) J Washer	3	6	10	6

==== Section 5 ====
First round
(Mexico) I De La Borbolla	1	5	3
(Czechoslovakia) P Macenauer	6	7	6
(United Kingdom) G Cholmondeley	2	0	2
(France) A Piel	6	6	6
(France) P Féret	6	6	6
(Denmark) E Worm	3	4	1
(France) E Thurneyssen
11	(Netherlands) H Timmer
(France) Augustin
(United Kingdom) N Sharpe
(Spain) E Flaquer
(India) A-H Fyzee

Second round
(Czechoslovakia) P Macenauer	9	6	5	6
(France) A Piel	7	3	7	1
(France) P Féret	7	6	9
11	(Netherlands) H Timmer	5	3	7
(France) Augustin	6	6	3	1	2
(India) A-H Fyzee	2	2	6	6	6
(United Kingdom) A Myers	6	6	4	2
6	(France) J Borotra	8	3	6	6

Third round
(Czechoslovakia) P Macenauer	2	3	6	3
(France) P Féret	6	6	1	6
(India) A-H Fyzee	2	2	6	8	1
6	(France) J Borotra	6	6	2	6	6

Fourth round
(France) P Féret	6	4	6	3	1
6	(France) J Borotra	4	6	4	6	6

==== Section 6 ====
First round

Second round
14	(France) L Aslangul	6	9	6
(Spain) J M Tarruella	3	7	2
(France) R George
(Colombia) F Restrepo
(Czechoslovakia) H Rohrer
(Austria) L von Salm
(Argentina) A-H Cattaruza	7	6	5	1	1
3	(United States) H Kinsey	5	1	7	6	6

Third round
14	(France) L Aslangul	5	2	8	6	6
(Colombia) F Restrepo	7	6	6	1	4
(Austria) L von Salm	1	0	4
3	(United States) H Kinsey	6	6	6

Fourth round
14	(France) L Aslangul	4	0	3
3	(United States) H Kinsey	6	6	6

==== Section 7 ====
First round

Second round
(Czechoslovakia) E Gottlieb
7	(Switzerland) C F Aeschliman
(Poland) S Czetwertyński	6	4	4	5
(Spain) E Flaquer	3	6	6	7
(France) P Canivet	3	6	6	7	0
10	(Romania) N Mișu	6	3	3	9	6
(France) F Poulin
(Italy) U L De Morpurgo

Third round
7	(Switzerland) C F Aeschliman	8	6	3	3	7
(Spain) E Flaquer	6	0	6	6	5
10	(Romania) N Mișu	6	3	6	5	7
(France) F Poulin	2	6	3	7	5

Fourth round
7	(Switzerland) C F Aeschliman	4	1	6	3
10	(Romania) N Mișu	6	6	2	6

==== Section 8 ====
First round

Second round
(India) S Bobb	4	6	2	1
15	(Argentina) G Robson	6	3	6	6
(Greece) P Papadopoulos	1	4	1
(United Kingdom) N Turnbull	6	6	6
(Indonesia) E.L. Sarkies
(Italy) C Serventi
(Netherlands) M Wetselaar
2	(France) R Lacoste

Third round
15	(Argentina) G Robson	3	6	6	6
(United Kingdom) N Turnbull	6	4	2	4
(Indonesia) E.L. Sarkies	0	3	4
2	(France) R Lacoste	6	6	6

Fourth round
15	(Argentina) G Robson	2	1	6	1
2	(France) R Lacoste	6	6	3	6

Preceded by 1926 Australasian Championships – Men's singles	Grand Slam men's singles	Succeeded by 1926 Wimbledon Championships – Men's singles
