= Hendrik Timmer =

Dutch tennis player (1904–1998)

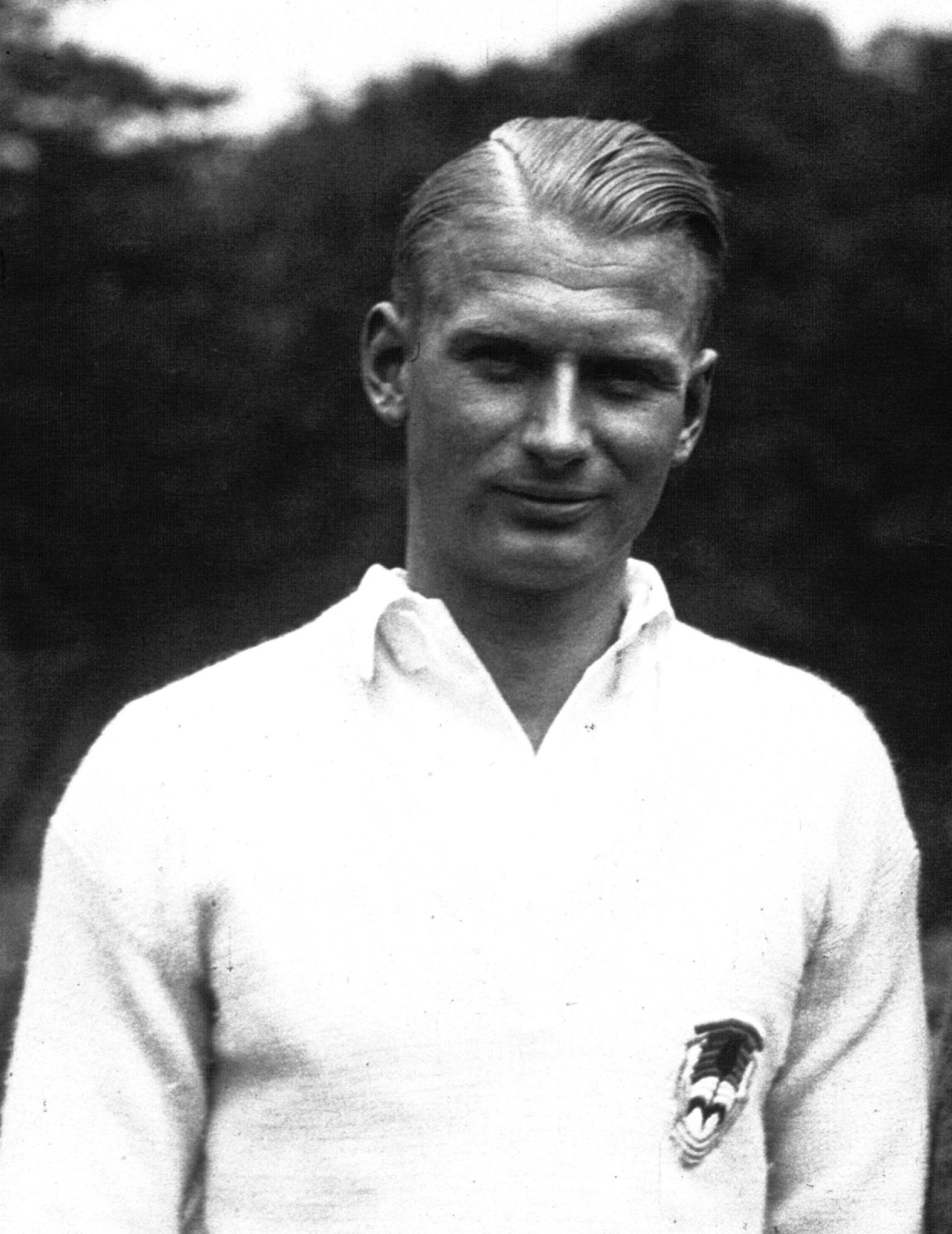
- Timmer in 1928
- Country (sports): Netherlands
- Born: 8 February 1904 Utrecht, Netherlands
- Died: 13 November 1998 (aged 94) Bilthoven, Netherlands
- Turned pro: 1923 (amateur tour)

Singles
- Highest ranking: No. 6 (1930, Bill Tilden)

Grand Slam singles results
- French Open: 4R (1927, 1929)
- Wimbledon: QF (1927, 1929)

Other tournaments
- Olympic Games: 3R (1924)

Doubles

Grand Slam doubles results
- Wimbledon: QF (1928, 1930)
- Olympic Games: 1R (1924)

Grand Slam mixed doubles results
- Wimbledon: 4R (1933, 1936)

Team competitions
- Davis Cup: F^{Eu} (1925)
Medal record
Representing Netherlands
Olympic Games
| Bronze medal – third place | 1924 Paris | Mixed doubles |

Hendrik "Henk" Timmer (Dutch pronunciation: [ˈɦɛndrɪk ˈtɪmər]; 8 February 1904 – 13 November 1998) was a Dutch sportsman, who primarily played tennis. Born in Utrecht, Timmer also won golf tournaments, became Dutch squash champion, played badminton and hockey. He died aged 94 in Bilthoven, four days before his former doubles partner Kea Bouman. Apart from being a Dutch tennis champion, he was Swiss, Welsh and Scottish indoors champion as well.

== Tennis career ==
He began his tennis career at the age of 19 when he won his first Dutch national championships. He scored his first international victory over Donald Greig in a mixed international team match between the Netherlands and Great Britain in 1923. The next year he drew international attention when he was featured in the championship match for the Swiss covered courts title in St. Moritz defeating the Hungarian champion Béla von Kehrling in five sets. At the 1924 Paris Olympics he won a bronze medal in the tennis' mixed doubles event, partnering Kea Bouman. He entered the inaugural British Hard Court Championships making it to the quarterfinal stage.

He reached the quarterfinal of the Wimbledon Championships in 1927 and 1929. In both years he lost to Frenchman, and eventual winner, Henri Cochet. In 1927 he was barely recovered from a broken leg, which he suffered four-month prior to the tournament and thus lost in five sets, after winning the first two sets, and in 1929 in three straight sets. He was a 9 times national tennis champion of Netherlands having two four-years streak between 1927–30 and 1932–35. He also won eight national doubles title and five mixed doubles titles as well.

In 1926 he was the mixed doubles challenger for the international edition of the Dutch championships pairing with Irma Kallmeyer, but was overcome by the couple of Julie Stroink-Cords and De Beer. In 1929 he was a finalist of the Dutch international championships with his partner Wilbur Coen losing to the American champions Bill Tilden and Frank Hunter. In the same tournament Timmer reached the semifinal where he was eliminated by Hunter in three sets. Next year he faced Tilden again in an unsuccessful doubles final rematch; that time Timmer teamed with compatriot Arthur Diemer Kool, while Tilden chose Daniel Prenn. He also lost the mixed doubles final with Else Støckel to Roderich Menzel and Margaretha Dros-Canters. A week later he met Menzel again for the singles trophy of the Grand Hotel Panhans Championships in Semmering where he was beaten in three straight sets. In October 1930 he celebrated a triple crown feat at the Welsh Covered Court Championships in Llandudno where he clinched the singles, doubles and mixed doubles titles. In November he won the Lowland Championships of England in Peebles. He endorsed the doubles final partnering Francis Fisher.

He missed the whole 1931 season because of an illness. In early 1932 he suffered from pneumonia. In mid-June he made his comeback as a runner-up for the London Championships having it lost to Jack Crawford in four sets. In Liverpool at the Northern Championships he clinched the title by defeating home-favorite Nigel Sharpe. The same year he played his first Dutch international final against von Kehrling but came short. The following year he went for the title again but was stopped the second time by Giorgio de Stefani in a four set final. Timmer found consolation in the doubles contest where he and Kehrling took revenge by defeating de Stefani and George Lyttleton-Rogers and gaining the title. The key of the winning form was that Timmer overcame his well-known weak serve. Also in 1933 he participated in the West of England Championships only losing to Daniel Prenn in the final. In the 1934 Dutch International Championships Timmer was eliminated early in the semifinal by Hermann Artens. He was also unsuccessful in retaining the doubles title with Kehrling as the Austrian duo of Artens and Georg von Metaxa won that title as well. He had to skip the 1937 season as a result of rheumatism in his shoulder. He fought one of his last matches in 1938 against Kenneth Gandar-Dower, a victory of only two sets.

== Playing style ==
His main weapon was his pure and hard backhand. His only weakness was his service, a shot that lacked strength and character. In 1934 Harry Hopman named him "one of the best hardcourt players of the world". Bill Tilden praised his stroke technique and described him as an all-court player, who adapted a "French" tennis style. Timmer considered himself a baseline player. He was coached by former Davis Cup player Gerard Scheurleer. He practised three times a week with Davis Cup partner Christiaan van Lennep.

== Other sports achievements ==
In 1941 he won the national squash championships. In speed skating he completed the Elfstedentocht three times. In golf he won the De Golfbag Cup of Noordwijk in 1934. The next year he won the Noordwijk Golf Club first prize in an 18-hole bogey tournament. During his golf career he claimed ten golf titles.

== Personal life ==
Timmer was born on 8 February 1904 to an English teacher father. His wife was Annetje Timmer. He worked as an insurance agent for a major company. Apart from playing tennis he also coached the Dutch royalty for free including Juliana of the Netherlands.
