= 1928 Wimbledon Championships =

- Date: 25 June – 7 July
- Edition: 48th
- Category: Grand Slam
- Surface: Grass
- Location: Church Road; SW19, Wimbledon, London, United Kingdom
- Venue: All England Lawn Tennis and Croquet Club

Champions

Men's singles
- (France) René Lacoste

Women's singles
- (United States) Helen Wills

Men's doubles
- (France) Jacques Brugnon / (France) Henri Cochet

Women's doubles
- (United Kingdom) Peggy Saunders / (United Kingdom) Phoebe Watson

Mixed doubles
- (South Africa) Pat Spence / (United States) Elizabeth Ryan
← 1927 ·	Wimbledon Championships	· 1929 →

The 1928 Wimbledon Championships took place on the outdoor grass courts at the All England Lawn Tennis and Croquet Club in Wimbledon, London, United Kingdom. The tournament was held from Monday 25 June until Saturday 7 July 1928. It was the 48th staging of the Wimbledon Championships, and the third Grand Slam tennis event of 1928. René Lacoste and Helen Wills won the singles titles.

== Champions ==
=== Men's singles ===
(France) René Lacoste defeated (France) Henri Cochet, 6–1, 4–6, 6–4, 6–2

=== Women's singles ===
(United States) Helen Wills defeated (Spain) Lilí de Álvarez, 6–2, 6–3

=== Men's doubles ===
(France) Jacques Brugnon / (France) Henri Cochet defeated (Australia) John Hawkes / (Australia) Gerald Patterson, 13–11, 6–4, 6–4

=== Women's doubles ===
(United Kingdom) Peggy Saunders / (United Kingdom) Phoebe Watson defeated (United Kingdom) Eileen Bennett / (United Kingdom) Ermyntrude Harvey, 6–2, 6–3

=== Mixed doubles ===
(South Africa) Pat Spence / (United States) Elizabeth Ryan defeated (Australia) Jack Crawford / (Australia) Daphne Akhurst, 7–5, 6–4

Preceded by 1928 French Championships	Grand Slams	Succeeded by 1928 U.S. National Championships
