= René de Buzelet =

French tennis player

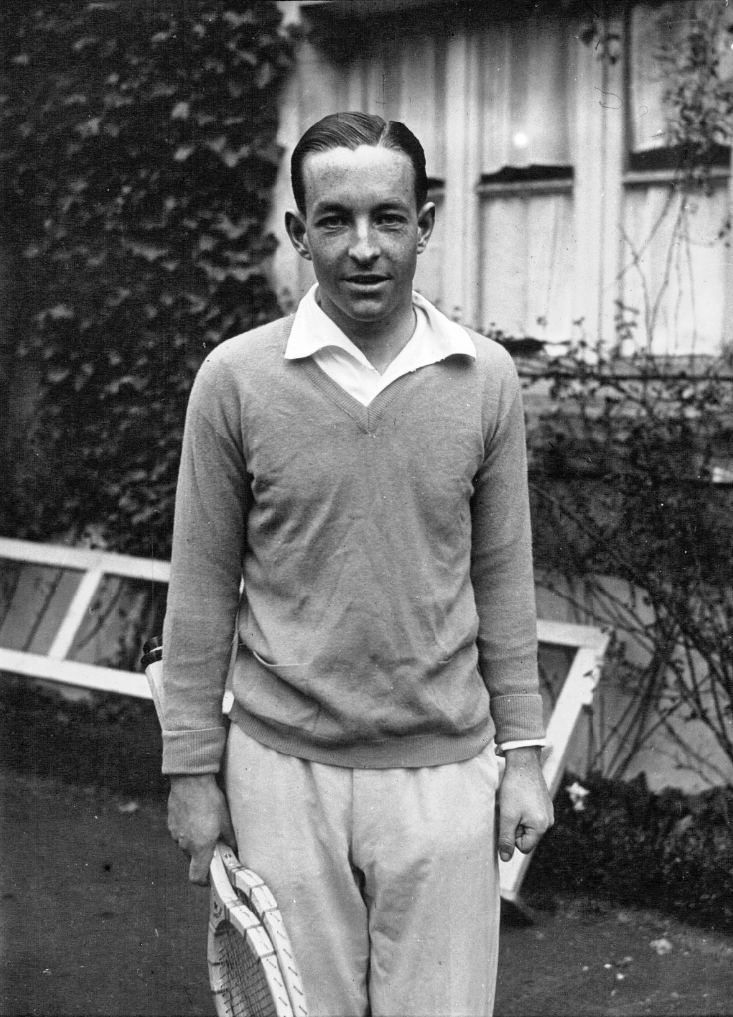
- De Buzelet at the Tennis Club de Paris in 1928
- Country (sports): France
- Born: 24 May 1907 Paris, France
- Died: 8 April 1995 (aged 87) Rébénacq, France

Grand Slam singles results
- French Open: 3R (1928)
- Wimbledon: 4R (1928)
- US Open: 3R (1928)

Grand Slam doubles results
- French Open: F (1928)
- Wimbledon: 3R (1928, 1929)

Grand Slam mixed doubles results
- Wimbledon: 2R (1929)

René de Buzelet (24 May 1907 – 8 April 1995) was a French tennis player who was active during the 1920s and 30s.

== Career ==
De Buzelet was a runner-up at the men's doubles event at the 1928 French Championships. Partnering Henri Cochet they lost the final in five sets to Jean Borotra and Jacques Brugnon.

In 1928 De Buzelet won the singles title at the French Covered Court Championships, played at the Tennis Club de Paris, after a five-sets victory in the final against Pierre Henri Landry. He was a runner-up to Jean Borotra at the same event in 1933. At the Coupe de Noël indoor tournament in January 1929 De Buzelet and Cochet defeated the brothers Jean and Édouard Borotra to win the doubles title.

De Buzelet and compatriot Christian Boussus were runners-up at the 1931 German Open Tennis Championships after losing the final in fives sets to Walter Dessart and Eberhard Nourney.

He competed at the Wimbledon Championships in 1928 and 1929. In 1928 he reached the fourth round in singles event which he lost in straight sets to Umberto de Morpurgo. In the doubles event that year he teamed up with Édouard Borotra and lost in a five-set encounter in the third round to Frank Hunter and Bill Tilden

== Grand Slam finals ==
=== Doubles (1 runner-up) ===
Result	Year	Championship	Surface	Partner	Opponents	Score
Loss	1928	French Championships	Clay	(France) Henri Cochet	(France) Jean Borotra (France) Jacques Brugnon	4–6, 6–3, 2–6, 6–3, 4–6
