= Charles Aeschlimann =

Swiss tennis player

- Full name: Charles Frederick Aeschliman
- Country (sports): Switzerland
- Born: 28 February 1897; Cannes, France
- Died: 4 May 1952 (aged 55)

Singles

Grand Slam singles results
- French Open: 4R (1926, 1927)
- Wimbledon: 3R (1926)

Other tournaments
- WHCC: QF (1922)
- Olympic Games: 3R (1924)

Doubles

Grand Slam doubles results
- French Open: 4R (1926, 1927)
- Wimbledon: 3R (1937)

Other doubles tournaments
- Olympic Games: 2R (1924)

Grand Slam mixed doubles results
- Wimbledon: 4R (1935)

Team competitions
- Davis Cup: SF (1923^{Eu})

Charles Frederick Aeschlimann (German pronunciation: [ˈʧaːls ˈɛːʃliːman]]; 28 February 1897 – 4 May 1952), also spelled as Charles Aeschliman, was a Swiss tennis player who represented Switzerland in the Davis Cup and the Olympic Games.

== Tennis career ==
He competed in the singles event at the 1924 Summer Olympics, reaching the third round in which he lost to Béla von Kehrling in five sets. With compatriot Maurice Ferrier he competed in the men's doubles event and reached the second round.

Aeschlimann competed in seven Wimbledon Championships between 1926 and 1938. In the singles event his best result was reaching the third round of the 1926 Wimbledon Championships in which he lost to Henry Mayes. His best doubles result was reaching the third round in 1937 with countryman Max Ellmer. With Gladys Clarke-Jervoise he reached the fourth round of the mixed doubles event in 1935.

Aeschlimann's best performance at a Grand Slam singles event was reaching the fourth round of the French Championships in 1926 and 1927. In 1923 he became the first Swiss player to participate in a Davis Cup match, winning his singles match against Ladislav Žemla of Czechoslovakia.

== Personal life ==
Aeschlimann met Leslie Bancroft US Indoor Champion at the 1924 Summer Olympics. The couple married in December 1924.
