= Donald Greig =

British tennis player (1897–1959)

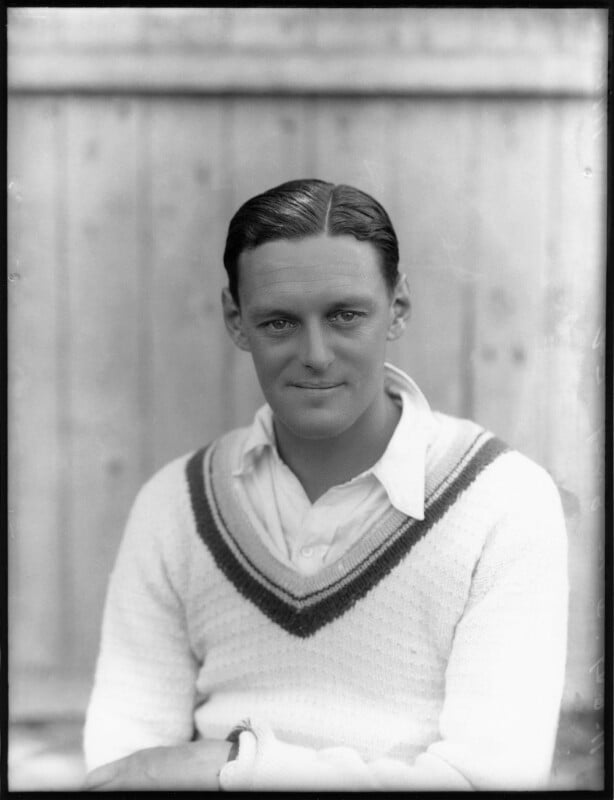
- Greig in 1929
- Full name: Donald McNeil Greig
- Country (sports): Great Britain
- Born: January 31, 1897 Battersea, London
- Died: September 15, 1959 (aged 62) Teddington, Middlesex

Singles
- Highest ranking: No. 10 (1926, Daily Mail)

Grand Slam singles results
- Wimbledon: 4R (1923, 1924, 1926, 1927)

Grand Slam doubles results
- Wimbledon: 3R (1931)

Grand Slam mixed doubles results
- Wimbledon: SF (1927)

Donald McNeil Greig (31 January 1897 – 15 September 1959) was a British tennis player.

Born in Battersea, Greig was an England representative player, most active on tour in the 1920s. His career singles titles include the East of England Championships and Kent Championships. Internationally he also had successes, winning the Sweden Covered Court (singles) and German Championships (doubles). He reached the singles round of 16 at the Wimbledon Championships four times. In 1927 he had to retire hurt during his round of 16 match against Jan Koželuh, but partnered with Phoebe Watson to make the semi-finals of the mixed doubles.

Greig is considered a pioneer in the delivery by air of newspapers across Britain and mainland Europe.
