= Pierre Henri Landry =

French tennis player

Pierre Landry
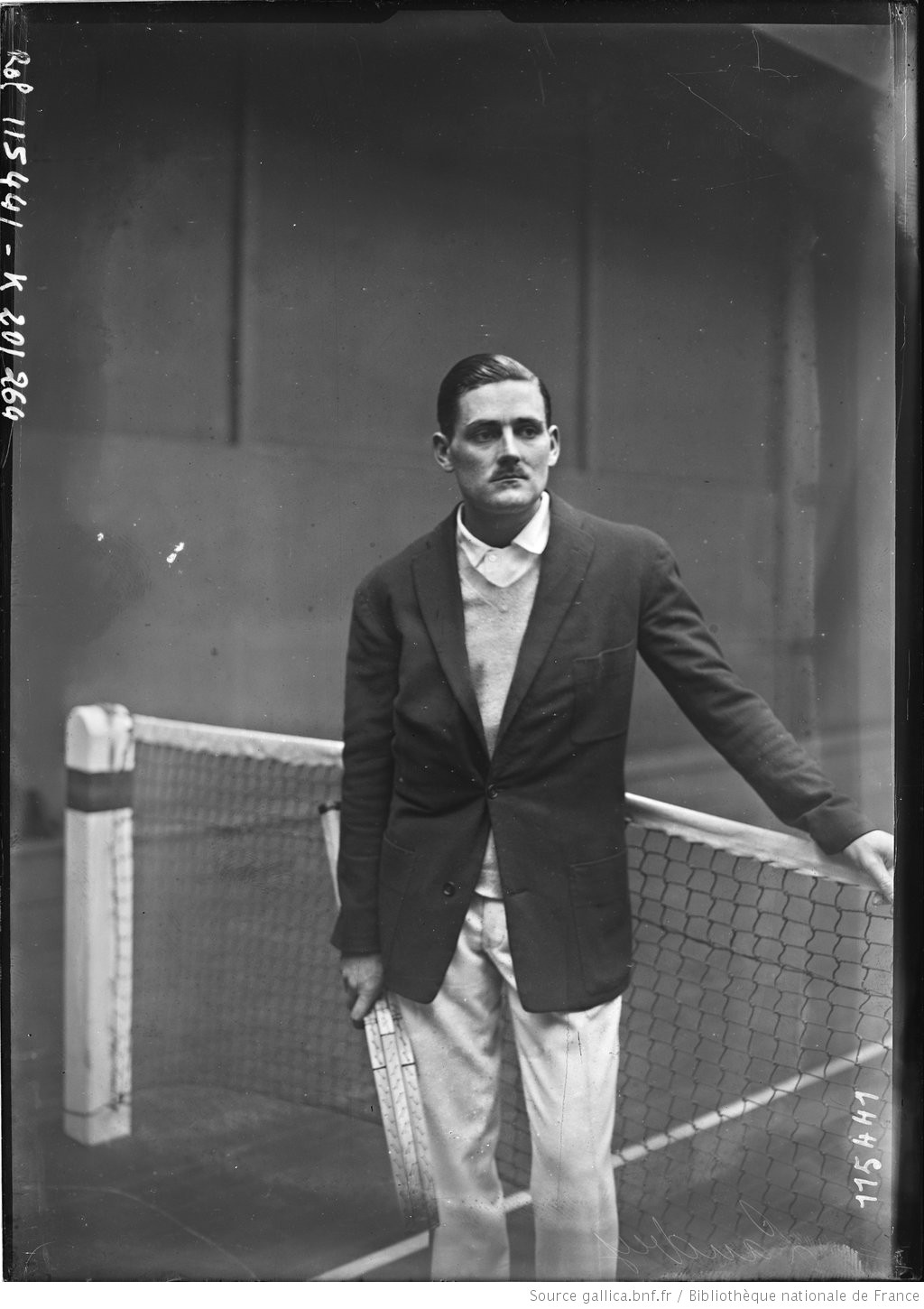
- Full name: Pierre Henri Landry
- Country (sports): France
- Born: 14 June 1899; Moscow, Russian Empire
- Died: 7 December 1990 (aged 91)

Singles

Grand Slam singles results
- French Open: 4R (1926)
- Wimbledon: QF (1929)
- US Open: 1R (1928)

Doubles

Grand Slam doubles results
- Wimbledon: QF (1931)

Mixed doubles

Grand Slam mixed doubles results
- Wimbledon: 4R (1930)

Pierre Henri Landry (14 June 1899 – 7 December 1990) was a Russian-born French international tennis player.

Landry competed once for the French team in the Davis Cup in 1926, defeating his opponent Colin Gregory in a dead rubber. In 1929, Landry beat Gregory (who won the Australian championships that year) at Wimbledon, before losing to Bill Tilden in the quarter finals. In 1932 he was ranked 14th in the French rankings.

He married Nelly Adamson, a Belgian tennis player, on 8 February 1937 in Bruges.
