= Raymond Rodel =

French tennis player and administrator (1895–1967)

- Full name: Raymond Jean Rodel
- Country (sports): France
- Born: 5 May 1895; Bordeaux, France
- Died: 21 February 1967 (aged 71); Lausanne, Switzerland

Singles

Grand Slam singles results
- French Open: 4R (1934, 1936)
- Wimbledon: 3R (1929)

Raymond Jean Rodel (5 May 1895 – 21 February 1967) was a French tennis player and administrator.

Rodel, from a family of Bordeaux industrialists, was married to the daughter of Italian composer Cesare Galeotti.

Active in the 1920s and 1930s, Rodel competed in the singles main draw of 15 French Championships, reaching the fourth round twice. He made the third round of the 1929 Wimbledon Championships, where he was beaten in four sets by Colin Gregory. In 1943 and 1944 he served as President of the French Tennis Federation.
