= 1935 Wimbledon Championships – Mixed doubles =

Mixed doubles
- 1935 Wimbledon Championships

Final
- Champions: (United Kingdom) Fred Perry (United Kingdom) Dorothy Round
- Runners-up: (Australia) Harry Hopman (Australia) Nell Hopman
- Score: 7–5, 4–6, 6–2

Details
- Draw: 80 (5Q)
- Seeds: 4

Events
Singles	men	women		boys	girls
Doubles	men	women	mixed	boys	girls
- Wimbledon Championships

Ryuki Miki and Dorothy Round were the defending champions, but Miki did not compete. Round competed with Fred Perry, and defeated Harry Hopman and Nell Hopman in the final, 7–5, 4–6, 6–2 to win the mixed doubles tennis title at the 1935 Wimbledon Championships.

== Seeds ==
1. (Germany) Gottfried von Cramm / (Denmark) Hilde Sperling (semifinals)
2. (France) André Martin-Legeay / (France) Sylvie Henrotin (third round)
3. (United Kingdom) Fred Perry / (United Kingdom) Dorothy Round (champions)
4. (United States) Wilmer Allison / (United States) Helen Jacobs (first round)

Click on the seed number of a player to go to their draw section.

== Draw ==
Key

- Q = Qualifier
- WC = Wild card
- LL = Lucky loser
- Alt = Alternate
- ITF = ITF entry
- PR = Protected ranking
- SR = Special ranking
- SE = Special exempt
- JE = Junior exempt
- JR = Junior Accelerator Programme entrant
- CO = College Accelerator Programme entrant
- NG = Next Gen Accelerator Program entrant
- w/o = Walkover
- r = Retired
- d = Defaulted

=== Finals ===
Quarterfinals
1	(Germany) Gottfried von Cramm (Denmark) Hilde Sperling	6	3	6
(Australia) Don Turnbull (Italy) Lucia Valerio	4	6	1
(United Kingdom) Frank Wilde (United Kingdom) Kay Stammers	6	1	7
(Australia) Harry Hopman (Australia) Nell Hopman	2	6	9
(New Zealand) Cam Malfroy (United Kingdom) Mary Heeley	9	3	1
3	(United Kingdom) Fred Perry (United Kingdom) Dorothy Round	7	6	6
(Australia) Adrian Quist (Poland) Jadwiga Jędrzejowska	2	6	6
(Australia) Vivian McGrath (Australia) Joan Hartigan	6	3	1

Semifinals
1	(Germany) Gottfried von Cramm (Denmark) Hilde Sperling	4	4
(Australia) Harry Hopman (Australia) Nell Hopman	6	6
3	(United Kingdom) Fred Perry (United Kingdom) Dorothy Round	6	6
(Australia) Adrian Quist (Poland) Jadwiga Jędrzejowska	1	3

Final
(Australia) Harry Hopman (Australia) Nell Hopman	5	6	2
3	(United Kingdom) Fred Perry (United Kingdom) Dorothy Round	7	4	6

=== Top half ===
==== Section 1 ====
First round

Second round
1	(Germany) Gottfried von Cramm (Denmark) Hilde Sperling	6	6
(United Kingdom) Charles Kingsley (United Kingdom) Effie Peters	2	0
(Belgium) Charles Naeyaert (Belgium) Nelly Adamson	3	6	6
(Switzerland) Hector Fisher (Greece) Phyllis Xydis	6	4	3
(United Kingdom) Jack Lysaght (United Kingdom) Phyllis Satterthwaite	6	9
(United Kingdom) RC Wackett (United Kingdom) Betty Uber	2	7
(South Africa) Norman Farquharson (United Kingdom) Mary Hardwick	6	4	6
(United Kingdom) JH Langmead (United Kingdom) Betty Soames	1	6	3

Third round
1	(Germany) G von Cramm (Denmark) H Sperling
(Belgium) C Naeyaert (Belgium) N Adamson	w/o
(United Kingdom) J Lysaght (United Kingdom) P Satterthwaite	2	5
(South Africa) N Farquharson (United Kingdom) M Hardwick	6	7

Fourth round
1	(Germany) G von Cramm (Denmark) H Sperling	7	6
(South Africa) N Farquharson (United Kingdom) M Hardwick	5	4

==== Section 2 ====
First round

Second round
(New Zealand) Alan Stedman (United Kingdom) Dorothy Shepherd-Barron	3	7	2
(United Kingdom) Harry Lee (United Kingdom) Joy Cunningham	6	5	6
(Australia) Don Turnbull (Italy) Lucia Valerio	6	6
(Canada) Laird Watt (Canada) Caroline Deacon	0	2
Q	(United Kingdom) W Filmer Sankey (United Kingdom) Audrey Wright	6	6
(United Kingdom) Arthur Vinall (United Kingdom) Elsa Haylock	4	2
(Italy) Uberto de Morpurgo (Spain) Bella Pons	w/o
(Spain) Enrique Maier (United Kingdom) Nancy Lyle

Third round
(United Kingdom) H Lee (United Kingdom) J Cunningham	6	3	6
(Australia) D Turnbull (Italy) L Valerio	3	6	8
Q	(United Kingdom) W Filmer Sankey (United Kingdom) A Wright	1	6
(Spain) E Maier (United Kingdom) N Lyle	6	8

Fourth round
(Australia) D Turnbull (Italy) L Valerio	7	6
(Spain) E Maier (United Kingdom) N Lyle	5	2

==== Section 3 ====
First round

Second round
4	(United States) Wilmer Allison (United Kingdom) Helen Jacobs	7	6	6
(United Kingdom) Henry Billington (United Kingdom) Betty Hobson	9	1	2
(Germany) Kay Lund (United Kingdom) Andree Lucas	6	6
(United Kingdom) Pat Sherwood (United Kingdom) Vera Montgomery	4	4
(United Kingdom) Guy Cooper (United Kingdom) Evelyn Dearman	6	2	6
(Belgium) André Lacroix (Belgium) Josane de Meulemeester	3	6	4
(United Kingdom) Frank Wilde (United Kingdom) Kay Stammers	6	6
(France) Pierre Henri Landry (France) Lucette Caron Culbert	1	1

Third round
4	(United States) W Allison (United Kingdom) H Jacobs	6	7
(Germany) K Lund (United Kingdom) A Lucas	1	5
(United Kingdom) G Cooper (United Kingdom) E Dearman	6	2	1
(United Kingdom) F Wilde (United Kingdom) K Stammers	2	6	6

Fourth round
4	(United States) W Allison (United Kingdom) H Jacobs	3	6	4
(United Kingdom) F Wilde (United Kingdom) K Stammers	6	3	6

==== Section 4 ====
First round
(United Kingdom) Ted Avory (United Kingdom) Joan Strawson	2	8
(United Kingdom) Donald MacPhail (United Kingdom) Phyllis King	6	10
(United Kingdom) John Olliff (United Kingdom) Joan Ingram	6	3	6
(South Africa) Vernon Kirby (United Kingdom) Freda James	0	6	1
(Australia) Harry Hopman (Australia) Nell Hopman	6	7
(France) Jean Lesueur (France) Simonne Mathieu	4	5
(Germany) Heinz Pietzner (France) Elizabeth Macready	w/o
(United Kingdom) Herman David (United Kingdom) Elsie Pittman
(United Kingdom) Richard Turnbull (United Kingdom) Helen Turnbull	0	3
(Kingdom of Yugoslavia) Franjo Kukuljević (South Africa) Mrs WG Lowe	6	6
(South Africa) Walter Musgrove (United Kingdom) Freda Scott	8	7
(Austria) Richard von Planner (Austria) Rosl Kraus	6	5
(United Kingdom) Bunny Austin (United Kingdom) Billie Yorke	6	7
Q	(United Kingdom) Brian Sturgeon (United Kingdom) Mary Burrows	3	5
(United Kingdom) Wilfred Freeman (United Kingdom) Mildred Freeman	9	6
(Republic of Ireland) Henry Purcell (United Kingdom) Nancy Dickin	7	1

Second round
(United Kingdom) D MacPhail (United Kingdom) P King	2	3
(United Kingdom) J Olliff (United Kingdom) J Ingram	6	6
(Australia) H Hopman (Australia) E Hopman	8	6
(United Kingdom) H David (United Kingdom) E Pittman	6	3
(Kingdom of Yugoslavia) F Kukuljević (South Africa) Mrs WG Lowe	5	3
(South Africa) W Musgrove (United Kingdom) F Scott	7	6
(United Kingdom) H Austin (United Kingdom) A Yorke	6	6
(United Kingdom) W Freeman (United Kingdom) M Freeman	3	4

Third round
(United Kingdom) J Olliff (United Kingdom) J Ingram	6	3	2
(Australia) H Hopman (Australia) E Hopman	2	6	6
(South Africa) W Musgrove (United Kingdom) F Scott	4	2
(United Kingdom) H Austin (United Kingdom) A Yorke	6	6

Fourth round
(Australia) H Hopman (Australia) E Hopman	11	3	6
(United Kingdom) H Austin (United Kingdom) A Yorke	9	6	2

=== Bottom half ===
==== Section 5 ====
First round
(New Zealand) Cam Malfroy (United Kingdom) Mary Heeley	6	8
(Belgium) Jack Van den Eynde (Belgium) Beatrice Watson	0	6
Q	GE Bean (United Kingdom) CJ Tyrrell	6	6
Q	(United Kingdom) Billy Collins (United Kingdom) Lady Rowallan	1	3
(Kingdom of Yugoslavia) Josip Palada (Netherlands) Truid Terwindt	9	6
(United Kingdom) Basil Lawrence (United Kingdom) Mrs BR Lawrence	7	4
(United States) Henry Culley (United Kingdom) Gethyn Harry	w/o
(United States) Wilmer Hines (United States) Dorothy Andrus
(Kingdom of Yugoslavia) Franjo Punčec (Netherlands) Madzy Couquerque	4	7	4
(Czechoslovakia) Roderich Menzel (Czechoslovakia) Emma Čepková	6	5	6
(Canada) Marcel Rainville (Hungary) Magda Baumgarten	6	6
(United Kingdom) George Godsell (United Kingdom) Madge Slaney	3	3
(South Africa) Max Bertram (United Kingdom) Ermyntrude Harvey	1	9	6
(Germany) Henner Henkel (Germany) Marie Horn	6	7	2
(South Africa) Pat Spence (France) Jacqueline Goldschmidt
(United Kingdom) Ian Collins (United Kingdom) Doris Howard	w/o

Second round
(New Zealand) C Malfroy (United Kingdom) M Heeley	6	8	6
Q	GE Bean (United Kingdom) CJ Tyrrell	4	10	4
(Kingdom of Yugoslavia) J Palada (Netherlands) G Terwindt
(United States) W Hines (United States) D Andrus	w/o
(Czechoslovakia) R Menzel (Czechoslovakia) E Čepková
(Canada) M Rainville (Hungary) A Baumgarten	w/o
(South Africa) M Bertram (United Kingdom) E Harvey	6	6
(South Africa) P Spence (France) J Goldschmidt	4	4

Third round
(New Zealand) C Malfroy (United Kingdom) M Heeley
(Kingdom of Yugoslavia) J Palada (Netherlands) G Terwindt	w/o
(Czechoslovakia) R Menzel (Czechoslovakia) E Čepková	6	1	4
(South Africa) M Bertram (United Kingdom) E Harvey	4	6	6

Fourth round
(New Zealand) C Malfroy (United Kingdom) M Heeley	4	6	6
(South Africa) M Bertram (United Kingdom) E Harvey	6	1	1

The nationality of GE Bean is unknown.

==== Section 6 ====
First round

Second round
(United Kingdom) Bobby Meredith (United Kingdom) Ruth Kirk	6	7	3
(United Kingdom) Raymond Tuckey (United Kingdom) Peggy Scriven	3	9	6
(Czechoslovakia) Josef Caska (United Kingdom) MA Thomas	6	6
(Canada) Robert Murray (Canada) Eleanor Young	1	2
(United States) David Jones (United Kingdom) Helen Dyson	9	2
(Austria) Hermann Artens (Netherlands) Ada Werring	11	6
(Italy) Alberto del Bono (United Kingdom) Jeanette Morfey	w/o
3	(United Kingdom) Fred Perry (United Kingdom) Dorothy Round

Third round
(United Kingdom) R Tuckey (United Kingdom) M Scriven	6	4	6
(Czechoslovakia) J Caska (United Kingdom) MA Thomas	3	6	1
(Austria) H Artens (Netherlands) A Werring	w/o
3	(United Kingdom) F Perry (United Kingdom) D Round

Fourth round
(United Kingdom) R Tuckey (United Kingdom) M Scriven	6	3	1
3	(United Kingdom) F Perry (United Kingdom) D Round	3	6	6

==== Section 7 ====
First round

Second round
(Switzerland) Charles Aeschlimann (United Kingdom) Gladys Clarke-Jervoise	6	6
(South Africa) John Hendrie (United Kingdom) Alex McOstrich	3	3
Q	(United Kingdom) Charles Fawcus (United Kingdom) Margot Lumb	4	6	6
(Austria) Franz Matejka (United Kingdom) Sylvia Mayne	6	1	3
(France) Antoine Gentien (France) Edith Belliard	1	6	6
(United Kingdom) Kenneth Gandar-Dower (United Kingdom) Joy Mowbray-Green	6	3	8
(Australia) Adrian Quist (Poland) Jadwiga Jędrzejowska	6	6
(United Kingdom) Jimmy Hunt (United Kingdom) Yvonne Law	4	4

Third round
(Switzerland) C Aeschlimann (United Kingdom) G Clarke-Jervoise	7	4	8
Q	(United Kingdom) C Fawcus (United Kingdom) M Lumb	5	6	6
(United Kingdom) K Gandar-Dower (United Kingdom) J Mowbray-Green	8	7	2
(Australia) A Quist (Poland) J Jędrzejowska	10	5	6

Fourth round
(Switzerland) C Aeschlimann (United Kingdom) G Clarke-Jervoise	2	2
(Australia) A Quist (Poland) J Jędrzejowska	6	6

==== Section 8 ====
First round

Second round
(Japan) Hideo Nishimura (United Kingdom) Susan Noel	6	5	6
(New Zealand) Buster Andrews (United Kingdom) Joan Ridley	2	7	4
(United Kingdom) David Williams (United Kingdom) Sheila Chuter	1	2
(France) Marcel Bernard (Spain) Lilí de Álvarez	6	6
(United Kingdom) Don Butler (United Kingdom) Jean Saunders	4	4
(Australia) Vivian McGrath (Australia) Joan Hartigan	6	6
(South Africa) Bill Muir (United Kingdom) Mary Whitmarsh	4	0
2	(France) André Martin-Legeay (France) Sylvie Henrotin	6	6

Third round
(Japan) H Nishimura (United Kingdom) S Noel	6	6
(France) M Bernard (Spain) E de Álvarez	4	2
(Australia) V McGrath (Australia) J Hartigan	7	6
2	(France) A Martin-Legeay (France) S Henrotin	5	4

Fourth round
(Japan) H Nishimura (United Kingdom) S Noel	3	4
(Australia) V McGrath (Australia) J Hartigan	6	6
