= 1935 Wimbledon Championships – Men's doubles =

Men's doubles
- 1935 Wimbledon Championships

Final
- Champions: (Australia) Jack Crawford (Australia) Adrian Quist
- Runners-up: (United States) Wilmer Allison (United States) John Van Ryn
- Score: 6–3, 5–7, 6–2, 5–7, 7–5

Details
- Draw: 64 (5Q)
- Seeds: 4

Events
Singles	men	women		boys	girls
Doubles	men	women	mixed	boys	girls
- Wimbledon Championships

George Lott and Lester Stoefen were the defending champions, but did not compete.

Jack Crawford and Adrian Quist defeated Wilmer Allison and John Van Ryn in the final, 6–3, 5–7, 6–2, 5–7, 7–5 to win the gentlemen's doubles tennis title at the 1935 Wimbledon Championship.

== Seeds ==
1. (United States) Wilmer Allison / (United States) John Van Ryn (final)
2. (Australia) Jack Crawford / (Australia) Adrian Quist (champions)
3. (France) Jean Borotra / (France) Jacques Brugnon (second round)
4. (United States) Don Budge / (United States) Gene Mako (semifinals)

Click on the seed number of a player to go to their draw section.

== Draw ==
Key

- Q = Qualifier
- WC = Wild card
- LL = Lucky loser
- Alt = Alternate
- ITF = ITF entry
- PR = Protected ranking
- SR = Special ranking
- SE = Special exempt
- JE = Junior exempt
- JR = Junior Accelerator Programme entrant
- CO = College Accelerator Programme entrant
- NG = Next Gen Accelerator Program entrant
- w/o = Walkover
- r = Retired
- d = Defaulted

=== Finals ===
Quarterfinals
1	(United States) Wilmer Allison (United States) John Van Ryn	6	10	6
(South Africa) Max Bertram (South Africa) Walter Musgrove	1	8	0
(United Kingdom) Pat Hughes (United Kingdom) Raymond Tuckey	6	6	6
(New Zealand) Buster Andrews (Republic of Ireland) George Lyttleton-Rogers	3	2	3
(Spain) Enrique Maier (United States) Sidney Wood	3	4	9	6	3
4	(United States) Don Budge (United States) Gene Mako	6	6	7	3	6
(France) Marcel Bernard (France) Christian Boussus	2	4	4
2	(Australia) Jack Crawford (Australia) Adrian Quist	6	6	6

Semifinals
1	(United States) Wilmer Allison (United States) John Van Ryn	4	6	6	6
(United Kingdom) Pat Hughes (United Kingdom) Raymond Tuckey	6	4	2	2
4	(United States) Don Budge (United States) Gene Mako	2	11	3
2	(Australia) Jack Crawford (Australia) Adrian Quist	6	13	6

Final
1	(United States) Wilmer Allison (United States) John Van Ryn	3	7	2	7	5
2	(Australia) Jack Crawford (Australia) Adrian Quist	6	5	6	5	7

=== Top half ===
==== Section 1 ====
First round
1	(United States) Wilmer Allison (United States) John Van Ryn	6	6	6
(United Kingdom) Herman David (South Africa) Pat Spence	4	1	3
(United Kingdom) Ted Avory (United Kingdom) Harry Lee	6	6	3	6
(United Kingdom) Jimmy Hunt (United Kingdom) Colin Ritchie	1	4	6	4
(United States) Henry Culley (United States) Wilmer Hines	4	1	3
(Japan) Hideo Nishimura (Japan) Jiro Yamagishi	6	6	6
(Germany) Heinz Pietzner (Denmark) Helge Plougmann	w/o
(United Kingdom) Henry Billington (United Kingdom) Laurie Shaffi
(United Kingdom) Jack Chamberlain (United Kingdom) Jack Harrison	8	6	6
(United Kingdom) Cecil Betts (United Kingdom) Jimmy Reddall	6	1	4
(South Africa) John Hendrie (South Africa) Bill Muir	6	13	7	6
(France) Léonce Aslangul (France) Guillaume Troncin	4	15	5	3
(Australia) Vivian McGrath (Australia) Don Turnbull	6	6	6
(United Kingdom) Brian Sturgeon (United Kingdom) Norman Taylor	3	2	1
(South Africa) Max Bertram (South Africa) Walter Musgrove	5	6	6	6
(Kingdom of Yugoslavia) Josip Palada (Kingdom of Yugoslavia) Franjo Punčec	7	4	1	2

Second round
1	(United States) W Allison (United States) J Van Ryn	3	6	7	6
(United Kingdom) E Avory (United Kingdom) H Lee	6	1	5	2
(Japan) H Nishimura (Japan) J Yamagishi	6	6	6
(United Kingdom) H Billington (United Kingdom) L Shaffi	2	4	4
(United Kingdom) J Chamberlain (United Kingdom) J Harrison	6	6	6
(South Africa) J Hendrie (South Africa) W Muir	4	2	3
(Australia) V McGrath (Australia) D Turnbull	5	6	3	6	4
(South Africa) M Bertram (South Africa) W Musgrove	7	2	6	2	6

Third round
1	(United States) W Allison (United States) J Van Ryn	9	7	6
(Japan) H Nishimura (Japan) J Yamagishi	7	5	1
(United Kingdom) J Chamberlain (United Kingdom) J Harrison	6	3	2	3
(South Africa) M Bertram (South Africa) W Musgrove	3	6	6	6

Quarterfinals
1	(United States) W Allison (United States) J Van Ryn	6	10	6
(South Africa) M Bertram (South Africa) W Musgrove	1	8	0

==== Section 2 ====
First round
3	(France) Jean Borotra (France) Jacques Brugnon	6	6	6
(Canada) Roland Longtin (Canada) Marcel Rainville	1	3	2
(United Kingdom) Pat Hughes (United Kingdom) Raymond Tuckey	6	3	6	6
(Austria) Franz Matejka (Austria) Georg von Metaxa	2	6	1	3
(Germany) Henner Henkel (Germany) Kay Lund	1	4	6	3
(New Zealand) Cam Malfroy (New Zealand) Alan Stedman	6	6	3	6
(Hungary) Emil Gábori (Hungary) Elek Straub	6	6	8
(United Kingdom) Billy Collins (United Kingdom) Donald MacPhail	4	4	6
(Italy) Alberto del Bono (Kingdom of Yugoslavia) Franjo Kukuljević	7	2	9	5
(Czechoslovakia) Josef Caska (United Kingdom) John Olliff	9	6	7	7
(New Zealand) Buster Andrews (Republic of Ireland) George Lyttleton-Rogers	5	6	7	3	6
(Italy) Giovanni Palmieri (Italy) Valentino Taroni	7	2	5	6	3
(Switzerland) Charles Aeschlimann (Soviet Union) Sergei Rodzianko	2	1	2
(United Kingdom) Kenneth Gandar-Dower (United Kingdom) Laddie Wheatcroft	6	6	6
(Czechoslovakia) Ladislav Hecht (Czechoslovakia) Roderich Menzel	9	4	4	6	6
(Austria) Hermann Artens (Austria) Richard von Planner	7	6	6	2	1

Second round
3	(France) J Borotra (France) J Brugnon	7	2	4
(United Kingdom) P Hughes (United Kingdom) R Tuckey	9	6	6
(New Zealand) C Malfroy (New Zealand) A Stedman	6	6	6
(Hungary) E Gábori (Hungary) E Straub	3	2	3
(Czechoslovakia) J Caska (United Kingdom) J Olliff	8	6	2	7	1
(New Zealand) E Andrews (Republic of Ireland) G Lyttleton-Rogers	10	4	6	5	6
(United Kingdom) K Gandar-Dower (United Kingdom) I Wheatcroft	1	8	6	7
(Czechoslovakia) L Hecht (Czechoslovakia) R Menzel	6	6	4	5

Third round
(United Kingdom) P Hughes (United Kingdom) R Tuckey	6	6	7
(New Zealand) C Malfroy (New Zealand) A Stedman	3	3	5
(New Zealand) E Andrews (Republic of Ireland) G Lyttleton-Rogers	6	6	6
(United Kingdom) K Gandar-Dower (United Kingdom) I Wheatcroft	3	4	4

Quarterfinals
(United Kingdom) P Hughes (United Kingdom) R Tuckey	6	6	6
(New Zealand) E Andrews (Republic of Ireland) G Lyttleton-Rogers	3	2	3

=== Bottom half ===
==== Section 3 ====
First round
Q	(United Kingdom) Freddie Della Porta (United Kingdom) Leslie Walter	3	6	9	6
Q	(United Kingdom) Cecil Farmer (United Kingdom) Edward Hansom	6	4	7	4
(Australia) Harry Hopman (Germany) Daniel Prenn	6	6	6
Q	(United Kingdom) Hugh Mackinnon (United Kingdom) Peter Young	3	2	2
(United Kingdom) Douglas Freshwater (United Kingdom) Bob Tinkler	2	0	4
(France) Jean Lesueur (France) André Martin-Legeay	6	6	6
(Spain) Enrique Maier (United States) Sidney Wood	6	6	6
(Italy) Uberto de Morpurgo (Netherlands) Hendrik Timmer	3	2	1
(United Kingdom) Harvey Hillier (United Kingdom) David Williams	6	6	6
(France) Pierre Henri Landry (United States) Bill Robertson	3	3	1
(Germany) Heinrich Kleinschroth (Netherlands) Diederik Teschmacher	w/o
(United Kingdom) Ian Collins (United Kingdom) Frank Wilde
(Norway) Johan Haanes (Norway) Finn Smith	4	6	6	2
(United Kingdom) Don Butler (United Kingdom) Bobby Meredith	6	8	0	6
Q	GE Bean (United Kingdom) Basil Lawrence	2	3	4
4	(United States) Don Budge (United States) Gene Mako	6	6	6

Second round
Q	(United Kingdom) A Della Porta (United Kingdom) L Walter	3	7	2	1
(Australia) H Hopman (Germany) D Prenn	6	5	6	6
(France) J Lesueur (France) A Martin-Legeay	6	6	4	4	2
(Spain) E Maier (United States) S Wood	2	3	6	6	6
(United Kingdom) H Hillier (United Kingdom) D Williams	3	4	4
(United Kingdom) I Collins (United Kingdom) F Wilde	6	6	6
(United Kingdom) D Butler (United Kingdom) G Meredith	4	1	3
4	(United States) D Budge (United States) G Mako	6	6	6

Third round
(Australia) H Hopman (Germany) D Prenn	3	6	1	8	6
(Spain) E Maier (United States) S Wood	6	3	6	6	8
(United Kingdom) I Collins (United Kingdom) F Wilde	3	2	14	4
4	(United States) D Budge (United States) G Mako	6	6	12	6

Quarterfinals
(Spain) E Maier (United States) S Wood	3	4	9	6	3
4	(United States) D Budge (United States) G Mako	6	6	7	3	6

The nationality of GE Bean is unknown.

==== Section 4 ====
First round
(Belgium) Léopold de Borman (Belgium) André Lacroix	w/o
(United Kingdom) George Godsell (United Kingdom) Richard Turnbull
(France) Marcel Bernard (France) Christian Boussus
(Poland) Józef Hebda (Poland) Ernest Wittman	w/o
Q	(United Kingdom) Bill Manby (United Kingdom) RC Wackett	6	4	6	8
(United Kingdom) Jimmy Jones (United Kingdom) Ronnie Shayes	3	6	1	6
(United Kingdom) Brian Finnigan (United Kingdom) Pat Sherwood	2	0	6	5
(Switzerland) Hector Fisher (Italy) Giorgio de Stefani	6	6	3	7
(South Africa) Norman Farquharson (South Africa) Vernon Kirby	6	9	4	7
(United States) Teddy Burwell (United States) David Jones	1	7	6	5
(Japan) Eikishi Ito (United Kingdom) Charles Kingsley	1	7	4	7	1
(United Kingdom) Guy Cooper (United Kingdom) Jack Lysaght	6	5	6	5	6
(United Kingdom) Dickie Ritchie (United Kingdom) Nigel Sharpe	6	6	3	6
(Canada) Robert Murray (Canada) Laird Watt	2	4	6	4
(United Kingdom) Claude Metcalf (United Kingdom) Arthur Vinall	6	1	1	3
2	(Australia) Jack Crawford (Australia) Adrian Quist	3	6	6	6

Second round
(United Kingdom) G Godsell (United Kingdom) R Turnbull	3	6	0
(France) M Bernard (France) C Boussus	6	8	6
Q	(United Kingdom) N Manby (United Kingdom) RC Wackett	3	4	7
(Switzerland) H Fisher (Italy) G de Stefani	6	6	9
(South Africa) N Farquharson (South Africa) V Kirby	6	6	6
(United Kingdom) G Cooper (United Kingdom) J Lysaght	4	3	0
(United Kingdom) R Ritchie (United Kingdom) N Sharpe	1	0	1
2	(Australia) J Crawford (Australia) A Quist	6	6	6

Third round
(France) M Bernard (France) C Boussus	4	4
(Switzerland) H Fisher (Italy) G de Stefani	6	2^{r}
(South Africa) N Farquharson (South Africa) V Kirby	4	7	11
2	(Australia) J Crawford (Australia) A Quist	6	9	13

Quarterfinals
(France) M Bernard (France) C Boussus	2	4	4
2	(Australia) J Crawford (Australia) A Quist	6	6	6
