= 1935 Wimbledon Championships – Men's singles =

Men's singles
- 1935 Wimbledon Championships

Final
- Champion: (United Kingdom) Fred Perry
- Runner-up: (Germany) Gottfried von Cramm
- Score: 6–2, 6–4, 6–4

Details
- Draw: 128 (10Q)
- Seeds: 8

Events
Singles	men	women		boys	girls
Doubles	men	women	mixed	boys	girls
- Wimbledon Championships

Defending champion Fred Perry defeated Gottfried von Cramm in the final, 6–2, 6–4, 6–4 to win the gentlemen's singles tennis title at the 1935 Wimbledon Championships.

== Seeds ==
1. (United Kingdom) Fred Perry (champion)
2. (Germany) Gottfried von Cramm (final)
3. (Australia) Jack Crawford (semifinals)
4. (United Kingdom) Bunny Austin (quarterfinals)
5. (United States) Wilmer Allison (first round)
6. (United States) Sidney Wood (quarterfinals)
7. (Czechoslovakia) Roderich Menzel (quarterfinals)
8. (France) Christian Boussus (fourth round)

Click on the seed number of a player to go to their draw section.

== Draw ==
Key

- Q = Qualifier
- WC = Wild card
- LL = Lucky loser
- Alt = Alternate
- ITF = ITF entry
- PR = Protected ranking
- SR = Special ranking
- SE = Special exempt
- JE = Junior exempt
- JR = Junior Accelerator Programme entrant
- CO = College Accelerator Programme entrant
- NG = Next Gen Accelerator Program entrant
- w/o = Walkover
- r = Retired
- d = Defaulted

=== Finals ===
Quarterfinals
1	(United Kingdom) Fred Perry	9	6	6
7	(Czechoslovakia) Roderich Menzel	7	1	1
3	(Australia) Jack Crawford	6	6	6	5	6
6	(United States) Sidney Wood	4	3	8	7	1
(United States) Don Budge	3	10	6	7
4	(United Kingdom) Bunny Austin	6	8	4	5
(Australia) Vivian McGrath	4	2	6	1
2	(Germany) Gottfried von Cramm	6	6	4	6

Semifinals
1	(United Kingdom) Fred Perry	6	3	6	6
3	(Australia) Jack Crawford	2	6	4	4
(United States) Don Budge	6	4	3	2
2	(Germany) Gottfried von Cramm	4	6	6	6

Final
1	(United Kingdom) Fred Perry	6	6	6
2	(Germany) Gottfried von Cramm	2	4	4

=== Top half ===
==== Section 1 ====
First round
1	(United Kingdom) Fred Perry	6	6	6
(Canada) Marcel Rainville	1	1	3
(Belgium) André Lacroix	6	1	6	3	4
(United States) Wilmer Hines	4	6	3	6	6
(Norway) Finn Smith	5	6	6	9	6
(Republic of Ireland) George Lyttleton-Rogers	7	1	3	11	4
(Australia) Don Turnbull	2	3	6
(United States) John Van Ryn	6	6	8
Q	(United Kingdom) Eric Filby	3	2	4
(France) Jean Lesueur	6	6	6
Q	(United Kingdom) Cecil Betts	4	3	3
(Kingdom of Yugoslavia) Josip Palada	6	6	6
(Netherlands) Hendrik Timmer	6	6	6
(United Kingdom) Alan Brown	3	1	1
(Austria) Hermann Artens	4	3	7
(United Kingdom) Colin Ritchie	6	6	9

Second round
1	(United Kingdom) F Perry	6	7	6
(United States) W Hines	1	5	3
(Norway) F Smith	3	0	2
(United States) J Van Ryn	6	6	6
(France) J Lesueur	6	3	5	2
(Kingdom of Yugoslavia) J Palada	3	6	7	6
(Netherlands) H Timmer	7	5	6	6
(United Kingdom) C Ritchie	5	7	2	3

Third round
1	(United Kingdom) F Perry	4	6	6	10
(United States) J Van Ryn	6	1	3	8
(Kingdom of Yugoslavia) J Palada	6	6	6
(Netherlands) H Timmer	3	4	4

Fourth round
1	(United Kingdom) F Perry	6	6	0	6
(Kingdom of Yugoslavia) J Palada	2	2	6	2

==== Section 2 ====
First round
7	(Czechoslovakia) Roderich Menzel	6	4	6	6
Q	(United Kingdom) Leslie Cater	1	6	2	0
(Germany) Henner Henkel	4	6	6	6	2
(France) Jean Borotra	6	1	8	2	6
(Japan) Hideo Nishimura	2	6	3	4
(Italy) Giovanni Palmieri	6	3	6	6
(Republic of China (1912–1949)) Choy Wai-Chuen	2	2	1
(New Zealand) Cam Malfroy	6	6	6
(South Africa) John Hendrie	5	7	6	6
(United Kingdom) Arnold England	7	5	2	2
(United Kingdom) Henry Burrows	6	1	4	4
(France) Antoine Gentien	3	6	6	6
(Spain) Enrique Maier	6	6	6
(United States) Bill Robertson	2	3	3
(United Kingdom) Bobby Meredith	4	6	6	6
(United Kingdom) Guy Cooper	6	3	1	0

Second round
7	(Czechoslovakia) R Menzel	5	6	6	2	11
(France) J Borotra	7	4	2	6	9
(Italy) G Palmieri	11	1	6	6	7
(New Zealand) C Malfroy	13	6	3	4	5
(South Africa) J Hendrie	3	5	5
(France) A Gentien	6	7	7
(Spain) E Maier	6	8	6
(United Kingdom) G Meredith	1	6	2

Third round
7	(Czechoslovakia) R Menzel	10	6	6
(Italy) G Palmieri	8	0	4
(France) A Gentien	5	0	3
(Spain) E Maier	7	6	6

Fourth round
7	(Czechoslovakia) R Menzel	6	6	0	6
(Spain) E Maier	3	0	6	3

==== Section 3 ====
First round
3	(Australia) Jack Crawford	6	6	6
(France) Jacques Brugnon	3	1	4
(United Kingdom) Jimmy Hunt	1	2	3
(South Africa) Vernon Kirby	6	6	6
(Canada) Laird Watt	6	6	2	7	5
(France) Pierre Henri Landry	8	1	6	5	7
(France) Marcel Bernard	4	6	7	4	5
(Czechoslovakia) Ladislav Hecht	6	2	5	6	7
(Denmark) Helge Plougmann
(Estonia) Kristian Lasn	w/o
(United Kingdom) Pat Hughes	6	11	6
(United States) Henry Culley	3	9	2
(Kingdom of Yugoslavia) Franjo Kukuljević	6	6	6
(Hungary) Elek Straub	2	1	2
(Belgium) Léopold de Borman	6	6	0	0^{r}
(Germany) Kay Lund	4	4	6	2

Second round
3	(Australia) J Crawford	6	6	5	6
(South Africa) V Kirby	1	0	7	2
(France) PH Landry	4	6	4	2
(Czechoslovakia) L Hecht	6	1	6	6
(Denmark) H Plougmann	2	3	2
(United Kingdom) P Hughes	6	6	6
(Kingdom of Yugoslavia) F Kukuljević	6	6	6
(Germany) K Lund	4	3	4

Third round
3	(Australia) J Crawford	11	6	6	6
(Czechoslovakia) L Hecht	9	4	8	2
(United Kingdom) P Hughes	3	6	3	6	6
(Kingdom of Yugoslavia) F Kukuljević	6	3	6	4	2

Fourth round
3	(Australia) J Crawford	7	4	6	6
(United Kingdom) P Hughes	5	6	4	2

==== Section 4 ====
First round
6	(United States) Sidney Wood	6	6	6
(Japan) Eikishi Ito	2	2	0
(Switzerland) Charles Aeschlimann	2	4	6	4
(United Kingdom) George Godsell	6	6	4	6
(United Kingdom) Charles Kingsley	3	5	6	6	4
(United Kingdom) David Williams	6	7	4	2	6
Q	(United Kingdom) Laurie Shaffi	8	4	8	7
(United States) Teddy Burwell	6	6	6	5
(South Africa) Bill Muir	6	2	4
(United Kingdom) Donald MacPhail	8	6	6
(Germany) Heinz Pietzner	w/o
(Italy) Alberto del Bono
(Australia) Harry Hopman	6	7	6
(United Kingdom) Douglas Freshwater	1	5	0
Q	(United Kingdom) Brian Sturgeon	3	0	1
(New Zealand) Alan Stedman	6	6	6

Second round
6	(United States) S Wood	6	6	6
(United Kingdom) G Godsell	3	3	2
(United Kingdom) D Williams	2	6	4	6	7
Q	(United Kingdom) L Shaffi	6	2	6	1	5
(United Kingdom) D MacPhail	6	6	6
(Italy) A del Bono	1	2	0
(Australia) H Hopman	6	3	6	6
(New Zealand) A Stedman	4	6	4	0

Third round
6	(United States) S Wood	6	9	6
(United Kingdom) D Williams	3	7	3
(United Kingdom) D MacPhail	1	3	1
(Australia) H Hopman	6	6	6

Fourth round
6	(United States) S Wood	6	6	3	6
(Australia) H Hopman	1	4	6	3

=== Bottom half ===
==== Section 5 ====
First round
Q	(United Kingdom) Paul Partridge	2	1	5
(Australia) Adrian Quist	6	6	7
(Belgium) Charles Naeyaert	4	4	1
(Switzerland) Max Ellmer	6	6	6
(United Kingdom) Frank Wilde	6	2	1
(United States) Don Budge	8	6	6
Q	(United Kingdom) Norman Taylor	6	1	1
(South Africa) Max Bertram	8	6	6
(Poland) Ernest Wittmann	w/o
(United Kingdom) Jack Lysaght
(Hungary) Emil Gábori	8	4	6	6
(Republic of Ireland) Henry Purcell	6	6	1	3
(Germany) Heinrich Kleinschroth	1	2	2
(Kingdom of Yugoslavia) Franjo Punčec	6	6	6
(United Kingdom) Ian Collins	6	0	6	4	1
8	(France) Christian Boussus	1	6	2	6	6

Second round
(Australia) A Quist	6	7	3	6
(Switzerland) M Ellmer	3	5	6	3
(United States) D Budge	6	6	6
(South Africa) M Bertram	4	2	3
(United Kingdom) J Lysaght	4	3	2
(Hungary) E Gábori	6	6	6
(Kingdom of Yugoslavia) F Punčec	5	8	2	2
8	(France) C Boussus	7	6	6	6

Third round
(Australia) A Quist	6	3	3
(United States) D Budge	8	6	6
(Hungary) E Gábori	6	3	4
8	(France) C Boussus	8	6	6

Fourth round
(United States) D Budge	6	6	3	6
8	(France) C Boussus	3	2	6	0

==== Section 6 ====
First round
(Italy) Valentino Taroni	7	6	3	5	3
(United Kingdom) Don Butler	5	3	6	7	6
(United Kingdom) Herman David	1	5	1
(New Zealand) Buster Andrews	6	7	6
(Canada) Roland Longtin	4	7	6	0	4
(United Kingdom) John Olliff	6	5	2	6	6
(Netherlands) Diederik Teschmacher	w/o
(Austria) Georg von Metaxa
(United Kingdom) Henry Billington	6	7	6
(France) Léonce Aslangul	0	5	1
Q	(United Kingdom) Leslie Newman	1	4	3
(South Africa) Walter Musgrove	6	6	6
(Norway) Johan Haanes	6	6	0	6
(United Kingdom) Jack Harrison	4	4	6	4
(United Kingdom) Ted Avory	3	1	3
4	(United Kingdom) Bunny Austin	6	6	6

Second round
(United Kingdom) D Butler	2	7	4
(New Zealand) E Andrews	6	9	6
(United Kingdom) J Olliff	6	6	5	6
(Austria) G von Metaxa	3	2	7	2
(United Kingdom) H Billington	5	3	8
(South Africa) W Musgrove	7	6	10
(Norway) J Haanes	2	0	2
4	(United Kingdom) H Austin	6	6	6

Third round
(New Zealand) E Andrews	6	11	6	6
(United Kingdom) J Olliff	3	9	8	3
(South Africa) W Musgrove	3	0	6	0
4	(United Kingdom) H Austin	6	6	3	6

Fourth round
(New Zealand) E Andrews	6	1	4	0
4	(United Kingdom) H Austin	4	6	6	6

==== Section 7 ====
First round
(No citizenship) Daniel Prenn	2	3	6	2
(United Kingdom) Nigel Sharpe	6	6	3	6
(United Kingdom) Bob Tinkler	1	4	6	7	6
(Switzerland) Hector Fisher	6	6	3	5	2
(Poland) Józef Hebda	w/o
(Belgium) Jack Van den Eynde
(Italy) Giorgio de Stefani	6	6	6
(United Kingdom) Kenneth Gandar-Dower	4	1	2
(United Kingdom) Dickie Ritchie	8	2	5
(France) André Martin-Legeay	10	6	7
(United Kingdom) Richard Turnbull	3	1	1
Q	(United Kingdom) Harry Lee	6	6	6
(United Kingdom) Raymond Tuckey	6	2	7	6
(South Africa) Pat Spence	4	6	5	3
(Australia) Vivian McGrath	6	6	7	7
5	(United States) Wilmer Allison	4	3	9	5

Second round
(United Kingdom) N Sharpe	5	6	6	4	8
(United Kingdom) R Tinkler	7	3	1	6	6
(Belgium) J Van den Eynde	4	4	0
(Italy) G de Stefani	6	6	6
(France) A Martin-Legeay	7	1	6	2	6
(United Kingdom) H Lee	5	6	2	6	4
(United Kingdom) R Tuckey	4	2	4
(Australia) V McGrath	6	6	6

Third round
(United Kingdom) N Sharpe	8	3	6	3	7
(Italy) G de Stefani	6	6	3	6	5
(France) A Martin-Legeay	3	2	4
(Australia) V McGrath	6	6	6

Fourth round
(United Kingdom) N Sharpe	1	3	5
(Australia) V McGrath	6	6	7

==== Section 8 ====
First round
(Canada) Robert Murray	7	6	6
(France) Guillaume Troncin	5	3	0
(South Africa) Norman Farquharson	6	6	6
(United Kingdom) Bob Mulliken	1	0	3
(Japan) Jiro Yamagishi	6	6	6
(Italy) Uberto de Morpurgo	3	1	1
(United States) David Jones	5	3	6	4
(United States) Gene Mako	7	6	4	6
(United Kingdom) Pat Sherwood	6	6	11	2	8
(United Kingdom) Jack Chamberlain	0	2	13	6	6
Q	(United Kingdom) Harold Hare	6	3	3	1
(Czechoslovakia) Josef Caska	4	6	6	6
(United Kingdom) Jimmy Jones	7	6	8
(Austria) Franz Matejka	5	3	6
(Uruguay) Carlos de León	1	0	3
2	(Germany) Gottfried von Cramm	6	6	6

Second round
(Canada) R Murray	7	6	2	3
(South Africa) N Farquharson	9	4	6	6
(Japan) J Yamagishi	6	6	2	1	2
(United States) G Mako	2	2	6	6	6
(United Kingdom) P Sherwood	6	2	2	6
(Czechoslovakia) J Caska	1	6	6	8
(United Kingdom) C Jones	2	3	1
2	(Germany) G von Cramm	6	6	6

Third round
(South Africa) N Farquharson	6	4	6	4	1
(United States) G Mako	2	6	2	6	6
(Czechoslovakia) J Caska	1	6	4
2	(Germany) G von Cramm	6	8	6

Fourth round
(United States) G Mako	0	1	6	1
2	(Germany) G von Cramm	6	6	3	6

Preceded by 1936 French Championships	Grand Slams; Men's Singles	Succeeded by 1936 U.S. Championships
