= 1935 French Championships – Men's singles =

Men's singles
- 1935 French Championships

Final
- Champion: (United Kingdom) Fred Perry
- Runner-up: (Germany) Gottfried von Cramm
- Score: 6–3, 3–6, 6–1, 6–3

Details
- Draw: 89
- Seeds: 16

Events
Singles	men	women
Doubles	men	women
← 1934 ·	French Championships	· 1936 →

Second-seeded Fred Perry defeated Gottfried von Cramm 6–3, 3–6, 6–1, 6–3 in the final to win the men's singles tennis title at the 1935 French Championships.

== Seeds ==
The seeded players are listed below. Fred J. Perry is the champion; others show the round in which they were eliminated.

1. (Germany) Gottfried von Cramm (finalist)
2. (United Kingdom) Fred Perry (champion)
3. (Australia) Jack Crawford (semifinals)
4. (United Kingdom) Bunny Austin (semifinals)
5. (Czechoslovakia) Roderich Menzel (quarterfinals)
6. (Italy) Giorgio de Stefani (fourth round)
7. (France) Christian Boussus (quarterfinals)
8. (Australia) Vivian McGrath (quarterfinals)
9. (France) André Martin-Legeay (fourth round)
10. (Australia) Harry Hopman (fourth round)
11. (France) Marcel Bernard (quarterfinals)
12. (Australia) Adrian Quist (fourth round)
13. (France) André Merlin (fourth round)
14. (Czechoslovakia) Josef Caska (fourth round)
15. (Australia) Don Turnbull (fourth round)
16. (South Africa) Vernon Kirby (third round)

== Draw ==
=== Key ===
- Q = Qualifier
- WC = Wild card
- LL = Lucky loser
- r = Retired

=== Finals ===
Quarterfinals
1	(Germany) Gottfried von Cramm	6	6	3	6
8	(Australia) Vivian McGrath	2	4	6	3
4	(United Kingdom) Bunny Austin	1	10	2	6	6
5	(Czechoslovakia) Roderich Menzel	6	8	6	4	2
11	(France) Marcel Bernard	3	1	1
3	(Australia) Jack Crawford	6	6	6
7	(France) Christian Boussus	1	0	4
2	(United Kingdom) Fred Perry	6	6	6

Semifinals
1	(Germany) Gottfried von Cramm	6	5	6	5	6
4	(United Kingdom) Bunny Austin	2	7	1	7	0
3	(Australia) Jack Crawford	3	6	3
2	(United Kingdom) Fred Perry	6	8	6

Final
1	(Germany) Gottfried von Cramm	3	6	1	3
2	(United Kingdom) Fred Perry	6	3	6	6

=== Earlier rounds ===
==== Section 1 ====
First round

Second round
1	(Germany) von Cramm	6	6	6
Lorewski	3	0	2
(United Kingdom) Wilde	7	6	6
(Hungary) Ferenczy	5	4	3
16	(South Africa) Kirby	4	6	6	7
(Belgium) Van Den Eynde	6	1	3	5
(Czechoslovakia) Hecht	8	6	6
(France) Billaudot	6	1	1

Third round
1	(Germany) von Cramm	6	6	6
(United Kingdom) Wilde	1	4	4
16	(South Africa) Kirby	1	0	8
(Czechoslovakia) Hecht	6	6	10

Fourth round
1	(Germany) von Cramm	6	7	6
(Czechoslovakia) Hecht	3	5	2

==== Section 2 ====
First round

Second round
8	(Australia) McGrath	7	14	6
(France) Goldschmidt	5	12	2
(Switzerland) Ellmer	9	6	6
(France) Chevallier	7	2	0
(France) Langanay	6	6	6
(Netherlands) Teschmacher	2	4	2
(United Kingdom) Cook	4	2	3
9	(France) Martin-Legeay	6	6	6

Third round
8	(Australia) McGrath	6	6	6
(Switzerland) Ellmer	3	3	3
(France) Langanay	5	0	1
9	(France) Martin-Legeay	7	6	6

Fourth round
8	(Australia) McGrath	6	4	6	7
9	(France) Martin-Legeay	1	6	0	5

==== Section 3 ====
First round
(Italy) Canepele	6	4	4	5
13	(France) Merlin	3	6	6	7
(South Africa) Hendrie	7	6	6
(Denmark) Sperling	5	1	1
(Czechoslovakia) Malacek	1	6	6	6
(Monaco) Galeppe	6	0	3	2
(Poland) Baworowski	6	4	4	7	5
(France) Brugnon	4	6	6	5	7

Second round
4	(United Kingdom) Austin
(France) Vieillard
(Italy) Del Bono	5	7	7	8
(France) Sanglier	7	5	5	6
13	(France) Merlin	6	6	4	6
(South Africa) Hendrie	1	2	6	3
(Czechoslovakia) Malacek	9
(France) Brugnon	7	r

Third round
4	(United Kingdom) Austin	6	6	6
(Italy) Del Bono	2	3	1
13	(France) Merlin	6	4	4	6	6
(Czechoslovakia) Malacek	2	6	6	1	2

Fourth round
4	(United Kingdom) Austin	6	6	6
13	(France) Merlin	0	1	4

==== Section 4 ====
First round
5	(Czechoslovakia) Menzel	6	6	6
Guerrero	1	1	2
(France) Destremau	6	8	4	4	6
(South Africa) Muir	2	6	6	6	2
(Kingdom of Yugoslavia) Punčec	6	3	6	8
(France) Glasser	1	6	1	6
(Japan) Yamagishi	6	6	6
(France) Troncin	3	1	0
12	(Australia) Quist	6	6	6
(France) Rimet	3	0	0
(France) Gentien	2	8	6	8	9
(Canada) Rainville	6	10	3	6	7
(France) Jamain	6	6	4	8
(United States) Culley	3	3	6	6
(France) Rodel
(Czechoslovakia) Siba

Second round
5	(Czechoslovakia) Menzel	6	6	7
(France) Destremau	1	4	5
(Kingdom of Yugoslavia) Punčec	2	9	6	6
(Japan) Yamagishi	6	7	1	3
12	(Australia) Quist	6	6	6
(France) Gentien	1	2	0
(France) Jamain	1	6	7	6	6
(France) Rodel	6	8	5	0	0

Third round
5	(Czechoslovakia) Menzel	6	6	6
(Kingdom of Yugoslavia) Punčec	4	0	3
12	(Australia) Quist	6	6	6
(France) Jamain	2	4	4

Fourth round
5	(Czechoslovakia) Menzel	6	2	6	6
12	(Australia) Quist	4	6	0	2

==== Section 5 ====
First round
11	(France) Bernard	9	3	6	6
(United States) Robertson	7	6	3	4
(France) Tenaille	2	1	0
(Japan) Nishimura	6	6	6
(France) Pellizza	6	3	6	6
(Canada) Longtin	1	6	2	0
(France) Goldryn	4	3	6	14	4
(United States) Hines	6	6	2	12	6
(France) Feret	4	6	6	6
(Belgium) Naeyaert	6	4	2	4
(United Kingdom) Tuckey	6	6	7
(France) Merlin	1	4	5
(Switzerland) Fisher	6	6	6
(France) Cousin	0	2	0
(France) Terrier	8	0	0	1
6	(Italy) de Stefani	6	6	6	6

Second round
11	(France) Bernard	6	4	4	8	6
(Japan) Nishimura	1	6	6	6	3
(France) Pellizza	3	4	6	4
(United States) Hines	6	6	4	6
(France) Feret	10	7	2	6
(United Kingdom) Tuckey	8	5	6	3
(Switzerland) Fisher	2	0	1
6	(Italy) de Stefani	6	6	6

Third round
11	(France) Bernard	3	8	6	6
(United States) Hines	6	6	3	4
(France) Feret	6	1	2	5
6	(Italy) de Stefani	2	6	6	7

Fourth round
11	(France) Bernard	6	9	6
6	(Italy) de Stefani	3	7	3

==== Section 6 ====
First round
14	(Czechoslovakia) Caska	6	6	6
(France) Petra	2	4	4
(United Kingdom) Freshwater
(France) Borotra
(France) Berthet	4	5	6
(Germany) Henkel	6	7	8
(France) Lesueur	2	r
(South Africa) Bertram	6
(Kingdom of Yugoslavia) Pallada	6	6	5	6
(France) Journu	2	1	7	4

Second round
14	(Czechoslovakia) Caska	12	7	6
(United Kingdom) Freshwater	10	5	0
(Germany) Henkel	6	7	6
(South Africa) Bertram	2	5	1
(Kingdom of Yugoslavia) Pallada	6	6	6
(Austria) Von Metaxa	1	3	3
(Belgium) Geelhand De Merxem	2	2	0
3	(Australia) Crawford	6	6	6

Third round
14	(Czechoslovakia) Caska	3	6	6	6
(Germany) Henkel	6	4	3	2
(Kingdom of Yugoslavia) Pallada	1	3	4
3	(Australia) Crawford	6	6	6

Fourth round
14	(Czechoslovakia) Caska	3	7	1
3	(Australia) Crawford	6	9	6

==== Section 7 ====
First round

Second round
10	(Australia) Hopman	6	6	6
(France) Bacquart	3	3	1
(France) Weiss	6	5	2	2
(South Africa) Farquharson	2	7	6	6
(France) Merlin	2	2	5
(Germany) Denker	6	6	7
(Greece) Nicolaides	3	0	0
7	(France) Boussus	6	6	6

Third round
10	(Australia) Hopman	6	6	6
(South Africa) Farquharson	2	3	1
(Germany) Denker	2	0	1
7	(France) Boussus	6	6	6

Fourth round
10	(Australia) Hopman	6	7	1	2	0
7	(France) Boussus	2	5	6	6	6

==== Section 8 ====
First round

Second round
(France) George	1	6	3	1
(Italy) Rado	6	4	6	6
(France) Bonte	6	2	0	r
15	(Australia) Turnbull	3	6	6
(Switzerland) Mercier-Odier	2	3	4
(Spain) Maier	6	6	6
(Monaco) Landau	6	4	3	2
2	(United Kingdom) Perry	3	6	6	6

Third round
(Italy) Rado	0	6	3	2
15	(Australia) Turnbull	6	4	6	6
(Spain) Maier	2	4	2
2	(United Kingdom) Perry	6	6	6

Fourth round
15	(Australia) Turnbull	3	3	3
2	(United Kingdom) Perry	6	6	6

Preceded by 1935 Australian Championships – Men's singles	Grand Slam men's singles	Succeeded by 1935 Wimbledon Championships – Men's singles
