= 1935 Wimbledon Championships – Women's doubles =

Women's doubles
- 1935 Wimbledon Championships

Final
- Champions: (United Kingdom) Freda James (United Kingdom) Kay Stammers
- Runners-up: (France) Simonne Mathieu (Denmark) Hilde Sperling
- Score: 6–1, 6–4

Details
- Draw: 48 (5Q)
- Seeds: 4

Events
Singles	men	women		boys	girls
Doubles	men	women	mixed	boys	girls
- Wimbledon Championships

Simonne Mathieu and Elizabeth Ryan were the defending champions, but Ryan did not compete. Mathieu partnered with Hilde Sperling, but lost to Freda James and Kay Stammers in the final, 6–1, 6–4.

== Seeds ==
1. (United States) Dorothy Andrus / (France) Sylvie Henrotin (third round)
2. (France) Simonne Mathieu / (Denmark) Hilde Sperling (final)
3. (United Kingdom) Freda James / (United Kingdom) Kay Stammers (champions)
4. (United Kingdom) Elsie Pittman / (United Kingdom) Billie Yorke (third round)

Click on the seed number of a player to go to their draw section.

== Draw ==
Key

- Q = Qualifier
- WC = Wild card
- LL = Lucky loser
- Alt = Alternate
- ITF = ITF entry
- PR = Protected ranking
- SR = Special ranking
- SE = Special exempt
- JE = Junior exempt
- JR = Junior Accelerator Programme entrant
- CO = College Accelerator Programme entrant
- NG = Next Gen Accelerator Program entrant
- w/o = Walkover
- r = Retired
- d = Defaulted

=== Finals ===
Quarterfinals
2	(France) Simonne Mathieu (Denmark) Hilde Sperling	4	6	6
(United Kingdom) Ermyntrude Harvey (United Kingdom) Joan Ingram	6	3	2
(United Kingdom) Doris Howard (Belgium) Josane de Meulemeester	6	6
(Australia) Joan Hartigan (Australia) Nell Hopman	1	3
(Poland) Jadwiga Jędrzejowska (United Kingdom) Susan Noel	3	3
3	(United Kingdom) Freda James (United Kingdom) Kay Stammers	6	6
(United Kingdom) Elsa Haylock (United Kingdom) Ruth Kirk	2	7	6
(United Kingdom) Evelyn Dearman (United Kingdom) Nancy Lyle	6	5	4

Semifinals
2	(France) Simonne Mathieu (Denmark) Hilde Sperling	6	8
(United Kingdom) Doris Howard (Belgium) Josane de Meulemeester	4	6
3	(United Kingdom) Freda James (United Kingdom) Kay Stammers	6	6
(United Kingdom) Elsa Haylock (United Kingdom) Ruth Kirk	3	0

Final
2	(France) Simonne Mathieu (Denmark) Hilde Sperling	1	4
3	(United Kingdom) Freda James (United Kingdom) Kay Stammers	6	6

=== Top half ===
==== Section 1 ====
First round

Second round
2	(France) Simonne Mathieu (Denmark) Hilde Sperling	6	6
(United Kingdom) Nina Brown (United Kingdom) Gladys Southwell	2	4
(United Kingdom) Dorothy Crichton (United Kingdom) Mrs AK Guyer	3	7	1
(France) Edith Belliard (France) Jacqueline Goldschmidt	6	5	6
(Belgium) Beatrice Watson (Belgium) Elise Watson	7	6
(Canada) Caroline Deacon (Canada) Eleanor Young	5	3
(United Kingdom) Ermyntrude Harvey (United Kingdom) Joan Ingram	6	6
(United Kingdom) Gaby Curtis (United Kingdom) Andree Lucas	2	4

Third round
2	(France) S Mathieu (Denmark) H Sperling	6	7
(France) E Belliard (France) J Goldschmidt	2	5
(Belgium) B Watson (Belgium) E Watson	1	0
(United Kingdom) E Harvey (United Kingdom) J Ingram	6	6

Quarterfinals
2	(France) S Mathieu (Denmark) H Sperling	4	6	6
(United Kingdom) E Harvey (United Kingdom) J Ingram	6	3	2

==== Section 2 ====
First round
4	(United Kingdom) Elsie Pittman (United Kingdom) Billie Yorke	6	6
(United Kingdom) Sybil Edwards (United Kingdom) Betty Uber	4	2
(United Kingdom) Eileen Fearnley-Whittingstall (United Kingdom) Phyllis King	6	6
(United Kingdom) Cecily Marriott (United Kingdom) Madge Slaney	2	0
(United Kingdom) Doris Howard (Belgium) Josane de Meulemeester	6	6
(Belgium) Nelly Adamson (Netherlands) Madzy Couquerque	4	4
(United Kingdom) Helen Dyson (Netherlands) Truid Terwindt	6	6
(Hungary) Magda Baumgarten (France) Elizabeth Macready	4	3
(United Kingdom) Helen Burr (United Kingdom) Yvonne Law	6	8
(United Kingdom) Mrs CP Brutton (United Kingdom) Audrey Wright	4	6
(United Kingdom) Betty Hobson (United Kingdom) Betty Soames	6	3	6
K Smith (United Kingdom) Gertrude Valentine-Brown	1	6	1
(Netherlands) Ada Werring (Greece) Phyllis Xydis	1	2
(Germany) Marie Horn (Italy) Lucia Valerio	6	6
(Australia) Joan Hartigan (Australia) Nell Hopman	6	8
(Argentina) Maria Bushell (Austria) Rosl Kraus	1	6

Second round
4	(United Kingdom) E Pittman (United Kingdom) A Yorke	4	6	9
(United Kingdom) E Fearnley-Whittingstall (United Kingdom) P King	6	3	7
(United Kingdom) D Howard (Belgium) J de Meulemeester	6	6
(United Kingdom) H Dyson (Netherlands) G Terwindt	2	2
(United Kingdom) H Burr (United Kingdom) Y Law	6	6
(United Kingdom) B Hobson (United Kingdom) B Soames	3	4
(Germany) M Horn (Italy) L Valerio	6	2	4
(Australia) J Hartigan (Australia) E Hopman	4	6	6

Third round
4	(United Kingdom) E Pittman (United Kingdom) A Yorke	8	2	0
(United Kingdom) D Howard (Belgium) J de Meulemeester	6	6	6
(United Kingdom) H Burr (United Kingdom) Y Law	3	5
(Australia) J Hartigan (Australia) E Hopman	6	7

Quarterfinals
(United Kingdom) D Howard (Belgium) J de Meulemeester	6	6
(Australia) J Hartigan (Australia) E Hopman	1	3

The nationality of K Smith is unknown.

=== Bottom half ===
==== Section 3 ====
First round
(United Kingdom) Patricia Brazier (United Kingdom) Joan Marshall	7	6	8
(United Kingdom) Sheila Chuter (United Kingdom) Mary Whitmarsh	9	1	10
(United Kingdom) Joan Ridley (United Kingdom) Dorothy Shepherd-Barron	7	3	6
(United Kingdom) Gladys Clarke-Jervoise (United Kingdom) Freda Scott	5	6	1
(Poland) Jadwiga Jędrzejowska (United Kingdom) Susan Noel	6	6
(United Kingdom) Joy Cunningham (United Kingdom) Joan Strawson	1	3
(United Kingdom) Mildred Freeman (United Kingdom) Helen Turnbull	4	6	6
Q	(United Kingdom) Florence Ford (United Kingdom) Pat Owen	6	2	2
Q	(United Kingdom) Nancy Fontes (United Kingdom) Rosemary Smith	6	7	6
(United Kingdom) Mary Hardwick (United Kingdom) MA Thomas	8	5	3
Q	(United Kingdom) CJ Tyrrell (United Kingdom) Penny Weekes	3	3
(United Kingdom) Mary Heeley (United Kingdom) Dorothy Round	6	6
(United Kingdom) Mrs CTC Ennals (United Kingdom) Mona Riddell	3	3
Q	(United Kingdom) Mary Chamberlain (United Kingdom) Violet Owen	6	6
(United Kingdom) Gethyn Harry (United Kingdom) Effie Peters	5	0
3	(United Kingdom) Freda James (United Kingdom) Kay Stammers	7	6

Second round
(United Kingdom) S Chuter (United Kingdom) M Whitmarsh	4	6	0
(United Kingdom) J Ridley (United Kingdom) D Shepherd-Barron	6	3	6
(Poland) J Jędrzejowska (United Kingdom) S Noel	10	6
(United Kingdom) M Freeman (United Kingdom) H Turnbull	8	3
Q	(United Kingdom) N Fontes (United Kingdom) R Smith	4	7
(United Kingdom) M Heeley (United Kingdom) D Round	6	9
Q	(United Kingdom) M Chamberlain (United Kingdom) V Owen	6	1	0
3	(United Kingdom) W James (United Kingdom) K Stammers	4	6	6

Third round
(United Kingdom) J Ridley (United Kingdom) D Shepherd-Barron	6	2
(Poland) J Jędrzejowska (United Kingdom) S Noel	8	6
(United Kingdom) M Heeley (United Kingdom) D Round	3	4
3	(United Kingdom) W James (United Kingdom) K Stammers	6	6

Quarterfinals
(Poland) J Jędrzejowska (United Kingdom) S Noel	3	3
3	(United Kingdom) W James (United Kingdom) K Stammers	6	6

==== Section 4 ====
First round

Second round
(United Kingdom) Dora Beazley (United Kingdom) Barbara Drew	5	6	4
(United Kingdom) Elsa Haylock (United Kingdom) Ruth Kirk	7	3	6
Q	(United Kingdom) Betty Batt (United Kingdom) Mary Burgess-Smith	4	6	6
(United Kingdom) Sonia Mavrogordato (United Kingdom) Madie Moss	6	3	4
(United Kingdom) Joy Mowbray-Green (United Kingdom) Jean Saunders	6	3	3
(United Kingdom) Evelyn Dearman (United Kingdom) Nancy Lyle	3	6	6
(South Africa) Mrs WG Lowe (United Kingdom) Christabel Wheatcroft	4	3
1	(United States) Dorothy Andrus (France) Sylvie Henrotin	6	6

Third round
(United Kingdom) E Haylock (United Kingdom) R Kirk	6	6
Q	(United Kingdom) E Batt (United Kingdom) M Burgess-Smith	3	2
(United Kingdom) E Dearman (United Kingdom) N Lyle	6	6
1	(United States) D Andrus (France) S Henrotin	3	4

Quarterfinals
(United Kingdom) E Haylock (United Kingdom) R Kirk	2	7	6
(United Kingdom) E Dearman (United Kingdom) N Lyle	6	5	4
