= 1935 Wimbledon Championships – Women's singles =

Women's singles
- 1935 Wimbledon Championships

Final
- Champion: (United States) Helen Moody
- Runner-up: (United States) Helen Jacobs
- Score: 6–3, 3–6, 7–5

Details
- Draw: 96 (10Q)
- Seeds: 8

Events
Singles	men	women		boys	girls
Doubles	men	women	mixed	boys	girls
- Wimbledon Championships

Helen Moody defeated Helen Jacobs in the final, 6–3, 3–6, 7–5 to win the ladies' singles tennis title at the 1935 Wimbledon Championships. She saved a championship point en route to the title, at 2–5 in the third set.

Dorothy Round was the defending champion, but lost in the quarterfinals to Joan Hartigan.

== Seeds ==
1. (United Kingdom) Dorothy Round (quarterfinals)
2. (Denmark) Hilde Sperling (semifinals)
3. (United States) Helen Jacobs (final)
4. (United States) Helen Moody (champion)
5. (France) Simonne Mathieu (quarterfinals)
6. (United Kingdom) Kay Stammers (quarterfinals)
7. (United Kingdom) Peggy Scriven (Third roud)
8. (Australia) Joan Hartigan (semifinals)

Click on the seed number of a player to go to their draw section.

== Draw ==
Key

- Q = Qualifier
- WC = Wild card
- LL = Lucky loser
- Alt = Alternate
- ITF = ITF entry
- PR = Protected ranking
- SR = Special ranking
- SE = Special exempt
- JE = Junior exempt
- JR = Junior Accelerator Programme entrant
- CO = College Accelerator Programme entrant
- NG = Next Gen Accelerator Program entrant
- w/o = Walkover
- r = Retired
- d = Defaulted

=== Finals ===
Quarterfinals
1	(United Kingdom) Dorothy Round	6	4	3
8	(Australia) Joan Hartigan	4	6	6
4	(United States) Helen Moody	6	6
5	(France) Simonne Mathieu	3	0
(Poland) Jadwiga Jędrzejowska	1	7
3	(United States) Helen Jacobs	6	9
6	(United Kingdom) Kay Stammers	5	5
2	(Denmark) Hilde Sperling	7	7

Semifinals
8	(Australia) Joan Hartigan	3	3
4	(United States) Helen Moody	6	6
3	(United States) Helen Jacobs	6	6
2	(Denmark) Hilde Sperling	3	0

Final
4	(United States) Helen Moody	6	3	7
3	(United States) Helen Jacobs	3	6	5

=== Top half ===
==== Section 1 ====
First round

Second round
1	(United Kingdom) Dorothy Round	8	6
(United Kingdom) Alex McOstrich	6	3
Q	(United Kingdom) Patience Thomson	0	6	4
(United Kingdom) Molly Hargreaves	6	4	6
(United Kingdom) Madie Moss	3	0
(United Kingdom) Mary Heeley	6	6
(United States) Dorothy Andrus	1	6	3
(United Kingdom) Jean Saunders	6	3	6

Third round
1	(United Kingdom) D Round	6	6
(United Kingdom) M Hargreaves	2	2
(United Kingdom) M Heeley	2	4
(United Kingdom) J Saunders	6	6

Fourth round
1	(United Kingdom) D Round	6	6
(United Kingdom) J Saunders	3	1

==== Section 2 ====
First round

Second round
8	(Australia) Joan Hartigan	10	6	6
(France) Sylvie Henrotin	8	8	3
(Belgium) Josane de Meulemeester	6	6
(Canada) Eleanor Young	1	4
(Netherlands) Truid Terwindt	2	7
(South Africa) Mrs WG Lowe	6	9
(United Kingdom) Mary Burgess-Smith
(Switzerland) Lolette Payot	w/o

Third round
8	(Australia) J Hartigan	4	6	10
(Belgium) J de Meulemeester	6	1	8
(South Africa) Mrs WG Lowe	6	6
(United Kingdom) M Burgess-Smith	4	3

Fourth round
8	(Australia) J Hartigan	5	7	6
(South Africa) Mrs WG Lowe	7	5	1

==== Section 3 ====
First round
4	(United States) Helen Moody	6	6
(Hungary) Magda Baumgarten	0	1
(United Kingdom) Jeanette Morfey	2	3
(United Kingdom) Billie Yorke	6	6
(United Kingdom) MA Thomas	6	6	5
(Spain) Lilí de Álvarez	8	4	7
(United Kingdom) Susan Noel	6	6
Q	(United Kingdom) Penny Weekes	3	3
(United Kingdom) Madge List	4	6
(United Kingdom) Vera Montgomery	6	8
(United Kingdom) Mildred Freeman	4	2
(United Kingdom) Joy Mowbray-Green	6	6
(United Kingdom) Ruth Kirk	5	2
(United Kingdom) Joy Cunningham	7	6
Q	(United Kingdom) Margot Lumb	3	2
(Czechoslovakia) Emma Čepková	6	6

Second round
4	(United States) H Moody	6	6
(United Kingdom) A Yorke	3	1
(Spain) E de Álvarez	w/o
(United Kingdom) S Noel
(United Kingdom) V Montgomery	5	8	7
(United Kingdom) J Mowbray-Green	7	6	5
(United Kingdom) J Cunningham	3	8	4
(Czechoslovakia) E Čepková	6	6	6

Third round
4	(United States) H Moody	6	6
(United Kingdom) S Noel	1	3
(United Kingdom) V Montgomery	5	1
(Czechoslovakia) E Čepková	7	6

Fourth round
4	(United States) H Moody	3	6	6
(Czechoslovakia) E Čepková	6	4	2

==== Section 4 ====
First round
5	(France) Simonne Mathieu	7	6
(United Kingdom) Mary Hardwick	5	4
Q	(United Kingdom) J Dawbarn	1	2
(United Kingdom) Sheila Chuter	6	6
(United Kingdom) Audrey Wright	2	6	3
(Austria) Rosl Kraus	6	4	6
(United Kingdom) Freda Scott	4	6	6
(United Kingdom) Edie Rudd	6	1	1
(United Kingdom) Gladys Southwell	4	5
(United Kingdom) Elsie Pittman	6	7
(United Kingdom) Ermyntrude Harvey	0	4
(United Kingdom) Joan Ingram	6	6
(United Kingdom) Doris Howard	6	3	6
(United Kingdom) Freda James	2	6	4
(United Kingdom) Andree Lucas	5	3
(United Kingdom) Phyllis King	7	6

Second round
5	(France) S Mathieu	6	6
(United Kingdom) S Chuter	3	4
(Austria) R Kraus	2	5
(United Kingdom) F Scott	6	7
(United Kingdom) E Pittman	4	4
(United Kingdom) J Ingram	6	6
(United Kingdom) D Howard	1	3
(United Kingdom) P King	6	6

Third round
5	(France) S Mathieu	6	4	6
(United Kingdom) F Scott	3	6	4
(United States) J Ingram	7	4
(United Kingdom) P King	9	6

Fourth round
5	(France) S Mathieu	8	3	6
(United Kingdom) P King	6	6	4

=== Bottom half ===
==== Section 5 ====
First round
(United Kingdom) Florence Ford	6	6
(United Kingdom) Gladys Osborne	2	1
(India) Leela Row	2	1
(United Kingdom) Evelyn Dearman	6	6
(Poland) Jadwiga Jędrzejowska	7	6
(United Kingdom) Betty Soames	5	4
(Italy) Lucia Valerio	6	6
Q	(United Kingdom) Sonia Mavrogordato	2	2
(United Kingdom) Eileen Fearnley-Whittingstall	6	6
(United Kingdom) Sybil Edwards	2	2
(Australia) Nell Hopman	6	6
(United Kingdom) Yvonne Law	2	1
(United Kingdom) Mary Whitmarsh	4	4
(United Kingdom) Dorothy Shepherd-Barron	6	6
(United Kingdom) Elsa Haylock	2	5
7	(United Kingdom) Peggy Scriven	6	7

Second round
(United Kingdom) F Ford	6	11	6
(United Kingdom) E Dearman	8	9	1
(Poland) J Jędrzejowska	6	6
(Italy) L Valerio	4	2
(United Kingdom) E Fearnley-Whittingstall	6	6
(Australia) E Hopman	0	2
(United Kingdom) D Shepherd-Barron	11	3
7	(United Kingdom) M Scriven	13	6

Third round
(United Kingdom) F Ford	0	7
(Poland) J Jędrzejowska	6	9
(United Kingdom) E Fearnley-Whittingstall	6	6
7	(United Kingdom) M Scriven	3	2

Fourth round
(Poland) J Jędrzejowska	6	6
(United Kingdom) E Fearnley-Whittingstall	2	2

==== Section 6 ====
First round
(France) Edith Belliard	6	7
Q	(United Kingdom) Rosemary Smith	0	5
(United Kingdom) Patricia Brazier	5	7	6
Q	(United Kingdom) Jenny St John Maule	7	5	2
(United Kingdom) Effie Peters	6	7
Q	(United Kingdom) Barbara Drew	1	5
(Belgium) Beatrice Watson	3	1
(United Kingdom) Nancy Dickin	6	6
(United Kingdom) Nancy Lyle	6	4	6
(United Kingdom) Gethyn Harry	0	6	4
(United Kingdom) Phyllis Whitley	1	4
(United Kingdom) Madge Slaney	6	6
(United Kingdom) Joan Strawson	2	2
(Netherlands) Madzy Couquerque	6	6
(Belgium) Nelly Adamson	3	2
3	(United States) Helen Jacobs	6	6

Second round
(France) E Belliard	9	8
(United Kingdom) P Brazier	7	6
(United Kingdom) E Peters	6	5	6
(United Kingdom) N Dickin	4	7	4
(United Kingdom) N Lyle	6	4	6
(United Kingdom) M Slaney	3	6	2
(Netherlands) M Couquerque	6	4
3	(United States) H Jacobs	8	6

Third round
(France) E Belliard	4	4
(United Kingdom) E Peters	6	6
(United Kingdom) N Lyle	5	1
3	(United States) H Jacobs	7	6

Fourth round
(United Kingdom) E Peters	2	1
3	(United States) H Jacobs	6	6

==== Section 7 ====
First round

Second round
(United Kingdom) Joan Ridley	6	6
(United Kingdom) Gladys Clarke-Jervoise	3	4
(Canada) Caroline Deacon	1	4
(United Kingdom) Mona Riddell	6	6
(Netherlands) Ada Werring	3	0
(Chile) Anita Lizana	6	6
(France) Jacqueline Goldschmidt	2	7
6	(United Kingdom) Kay Stammers	6	9

Third round
(United Kingdom) J Ridley	2	6	7
(United Kingdom) M Riddell	6	2	5
(Chile) A Lizana	2	6
6	(United Kingdom) K Stammers	6	8

Fourth round
(United Kingdom) J Ridley	0	6
6	(United Kingdom) K Stammers	6	8

==== Section 8 ====
First round

Second round
(Greece) Phyllis Xydis	2	4
(United Kingdom) Christabel Wheatcroft	6	6
Q	(United Kingdom) Pat Owen
(Spain) Josefa de Chávarri	w/o
Q	(United Kingdom) S Travers	2	2
(Germany) Marie Horn	6	6
(United Kingdom) Dora Beazley	0	2
2	(Denmark) Hilde Sperling	6	6

Third round
(United Kingdom) C Wheatcroft	6	7
Q	(United Kingdom) P Owen	2	5
(Germany) M Horn	3	0
2	(Denmark) H Sperling	6	6

Fourth round
(United Kingdom) C Wheatcroft	1	1
2	(Denmark) H Sperling	6	6

Preceded by 1935 French Championships	Grand Slams; Women's Singles	Succeeded by 1935 U.S. National Championships
