= 1935 International Lawn Tennis Challenge =

1935 edition of the International Lawn Tennis Challenge

Details
- Duration: 20 July 1934 – 30 July 1935
- Edition: 30th
- Teams: 28

Champion
- Winning nation: Great Britain

The 1935 International Lawn Tennis Challenge was the 30th edition of what is now known as the Davis Cup. Due to increased political tensions in Europe, entries for the Europe Zone declined sharply, causing the qualifying round system to be scrapped. Only 11 teams would enter the Europe Zone, with 17 teams entering the qualifying rounds; while six would enter the Americas Zone, 4 in North America and 2 in South America. Estonia entered the tournament for the first time.

In the America Inter-Zonal Final the United States received a walkover due to Brazil's absence, while in the Europe Zone final Germany defeated Czechoslovakia. The United States defeated Germany in the Inter-Zonal play-off, but would fall to Great Britain in the challenge round. The final was played at the All England Club Centre Court in Wimbledon, London, England on 27–30 July.

== America Zone ==
=== North & Central America Zone ===
Semifinals; 3–12 May
Mexico City, Mexico (clay)
Mexico	5
Cuba	0
Mexico City, Mexico (clay)
Taiwan	0
United States	5

Final; 17–19 May
Mexico City, Mexico (clay)
Mexico	0
United States	5

=== South America Zone ===
Final; 26–28 April
Montevideo, Uruguay
Brazil	3
Uruguay	2

=== Americas Inter-Zonal Final ===
United States vs. Brazil

United States defeated Brazil by walkover.

== Europe Zone ==
=== Qualifying round ===
First round
Warsaw, Poland
Poland	4
Belgium	1

Second round
Warsaw, Poland
Poland	5
Estonia	0
Austria
Greece	w/o
Berlin, Germany
Germany	5
Romania	0
Denmark	w/o
Switzerland
Stockholm, Sweden (clay)
Sweden	3
Ireland	2
Amsterdam, Netherlands (clay)
Monaco	1
Netherlands	4
Budapest, Hungary (clay)
Hungary	3
Norway	2
Yugoslavia	w/o
Spain

Qualifying round
Warsaw, Poland
Poland	5
Greece	0
Copenhagen, Denmark
Germany	5
Denmark	0
Stockholm, Sweden
Sweden	2
Netherlands	3
Budapest, Hungary
Hungary	2
Yugoslavia	3

- Poland, Germany, Netherlands and Yugoslavia advance to the 1935 Europe Zone main draw. (Note: Due to increased political tensions in Europe, entries for the 1935 Europe Zone declined sharply, causing the qualifying round system to be scrapped.)

=== Main draw ===
First round 10–14 May
Poland
bye
South Africa
bye
Scheveningen, Netherlands (clay)
Netherlands	0
Japan	5
Prague, Czechoslovakia
Czechoslovakia	4
Yugoslavia	1
Eastbourne, England (grass)
Australia	3
New Zealand	0
bye
France
bye
Germany
bye
Italy

Quarterfinals; 17 May–10 June
Warsaw, Poland
Poland	2
South Africa	3
Prague, Czechoslovakia
Japan	1
Czechoslovakia	4
Paris, France (clay)
Australia	3
France	2
Berlin, Germany
Germany	4
Italy	1

Semifinals; 14–17 June
Prague, Czechoslovakia
South Africa	0
Czechoslovakia	5
Berlin, Germany (clay)
Australia	1
Germany	4

Final; 12–14 July
Prague, Czechoslovakia
Czechoslovakia	1
Germany	4

=== Final ===
Czechoslovakia vs. Germany

Czechoslovakia
1
Prague, Czechoslovakia
12–14 July 1935

Germany
4

			1	2	3	4	5
1	(Czechoslovakia) (Germany)	Roderich Menzel; Henner Henkel	7; 5	6; 1	4; 6	2; 6	6; 4
2	(Czechoslovakia) (Germany)	Josef Caska; Gottfried von Cramm	2; 6	4; 6	2; 6
3	(Czechoslovakia) (Germany)	Ferenc Maršálek / Roderich Menzel; Gottfried von Cramm / Kay Lund	3; 6	7; 9	4; 6
4	(Czechoslovakia) (Germany)	Roderich Menzel; Gottfried von Cramm	2; 6	4; 6	6; 3	7; 5	1; 6
5	(Czechoslovakia) (Germany)	Josef Caska; Henner Henkel	6; 2	5; 7	4; 6	0; 6

== Inter-Zonal Final ==
United States vs. Germany

United States
4
No. 1 Court, All England Club, Wimbledon, England
20–24 July 1935
Grass

Germany
1

			1	2	3	4	5
1	(United States) (Germany)	Don Budge; Henner Henkel	7; 5	11; 9	6; 8	6; 1
2	(United States) (Germany)	Wilmer Allison; Gottfried von Cramm	6; 8	3; 6	4; 6
3	(United States) (Germany)	Wilmer Allison / John Van Ryn; Gottfried von Cramm / Kay Lund	3; 6	6; 3	5; 7	9; 7	8; 6
4	(United States) (Germany)	Wilmer Allison; Henner Henkel	6; 1	7; 5	11; 9
5	(United States) (Germany)	Don Budge; Gottfried von Cramm	0; 6	9; 7	8; 6	6; 3

== Challenge round ==
Great Britain vs. United States

Great Britain
5
Centre Court, All England Club, Wimbledon, England
27–30 July 1935
Grass

United States
0

			1	2	3	4	5
1	(United Kingdom) (United States)	Bunny Austin; Wilmer Allison	6; 2	2; 6	4; 6	6; 3	7; 5
2	(United Kingdom) (United States)	Fred Perry; Don Budge	6; 0	6; 8	6; 3	6; 4
3	(United Kingdom) (United States)	Pat Hughes / Raymond Tuckey; Wilmer Allison / John Van Ryn	6; 2	1; 6	6; 8	6; 3	6; 3
4	(United Kingdom) (United States)	Bunny Austin; Don Budge	6; 2	6; 4	6; 8	7; 5
5	(United Kingdom) (United States)	Fred Perry; Wilmer Allison	4; 6	6; 4	7; 5	6; 3

== See also ==
- 1935 Wightman Cup
