= 1934 French Championships – Men's singles =

Men's singles
- 1934 French Championships

Final
- Champion: (Germany) Gottfried von Cramm
- Runner-up: (Australia) Jack Crawford
- Score: 6–4, 7–9, 3–6, 7–5, 6–3

Details
- Draw: 89
- Seeds: 16

Events
Singles	men	women
Doubles	men	women
← 1933 ·	French Championships	· 1935 →

Fourth-seeded Gottfried von Cramm defeated Jack Crawford 6–4, 7–9, 3–6, 7–5, 6–3 in the final to win the men's singles tennis title at the 1934 French Championships.

== Seeds ==
The seeded players are listed below. Gottfried von Cramm is the champion; others show the round in which they were eliminated.

1. (United Kingdom) Fred Perry (quarterfinals)
2. (Australia) Jack Crawford (finalist)
3. (United Kingdom) Bunny Austin (quarterfinals)
4. (Germany) Gottfried von Cramm (champion)
5. (Czechoslovakia) Roderich Menzel (quarterfinals)
6. (France) Christian Boussus (semifinals)
7. (United Kingdom) Daniel Prenn (third round)
8. (Italy) Giorgio de Stefani (semifinals)
9. (Australia) Adrian Quist (third round)
10. (United Kingdom) Patrick Hughes (quarterfinals)
11. (Italy) Valentino Taroni (third round)
12. (Kingdom of Yugoslavia) Franjo Punčec (first round)
13. (United States) Wilmer Hines (third round)
14. (Austria) Hermann Artens (fourth round)
15. (United Kingdom) Mohammed Sleem (fourth round)
16. (France) Antoine Gentien (third round)

== Draw ==
=== Key ===
- Q = Qualifier
- WC = Wild card
- LL = Lucky loser
- r = Retired

=== Finals ===
Quarterfinals
1	(United Kingdom) Fred Perry	2	6	7	2
8	(Italy) Giorgio de Stefani	6	1	9	6
4	(Germany) Gottfried von Cramm	6	6	3	3	6
5	(Czechoslovakia) Roderich Menzel	2	3	6	6	3
6	(France) Christian Boussus	5	6	6	2	6
3	(United Kingdom) Bunny Austin	7	2	2	6	1
10	(United Kingdom) Patrick Hughes	6	4	2	3
2	(Australia) Jack Crawford	4	6	6	6

Semifinals
8	(Italy) Giorgio de Stefani	6	4	1	6	2
4	(Germany) Gottfried von Cramm	3	6	6	3	6
6	(France) Christian Boussus	3	6	5	4
2	(Australia) Jack Crawford	6	2	7	6

Final
4	(Germany) Gottfried von Cramm	6	7	3	7	6
2	(Australia) Jack Crawford	4	9	6	5	3

=== Earlier rounds ===
==== Section 1 ====
First round

Second round
1	(United Kingdom) Perry	6	6	6
(France) Augustin	4	1	1
(Greece) Nicolaides
(France) Merlin
16	(France) Gentien	3	6	6	6
(New Zealand) Andrews	6	3	4	2
(Australia) Hopman	3	6	6	6
(France) Cousin	6	2	1	1

Third round
1	(United Kingdom) Perry	6	6	6
(France) Merlin	2	3	4
16	(France) Gentien	2	5	3
(Australia) Hopman	6	7	6

Fourth round
1	(United Kingdom) Perry	6	6	6
(Australia) Hopman	2	3	3

==== Section 2 ====
First round

Second round
8	(Italy) de Stefani
(New Zealand) Stedman
(France) Thurneyssen
(Switzerland) Maneff
9	(Australia) Quist	6	3	6	6
(France) Jourde	2	6	1	1
(France) Merlin	6	6	5	6
(United Kingdom) Hare	1	3	7	1

Third round
8	(Italy) de Stefani
(France) Thurneyssen
9	(Australia) Quist	1	4	4
(France) Merlin	6	6	6

Fourth round
8	(Italy) de Stefani	8	6	6
(France) Merlin	6	2	2

==== Section 3 ====
First round
(France) Salvet	3	4	5
13	(United States) Hines	6	6	7
Mac Farlane	3	6	2	4
(Monaco) Galeppe	6	3	6	6
(France) Martin-Legeay	1	1	5
(Switzerland) Ellmer	6	6	7
(France) Troncin	6	8	4	6
(Austria) Von Metaxa	4	6	6	3

Second round
4	(Germany) von Cramm	6	6	5	6
(New Zealand) Malfroy	4	2	7	2
(France) Roche	0	3	4
(Italy) Palmieri	6	6	6
13	(United States) Hines	6	6	6
(Monaco) Galeppe	1	4	2
(Switzerland) Ellmer	6	6	6
(France) Troncin	0	2	3

Third round
4	(Germany) von Cramm	5	6	6	5	6
(Italy) Palmieri	7	3	4	7	2
13	(United States) Hines	10	4	0	7	3
(Switzerland) Ellmer	8	6	6	5	6

Fourth round
4	(Germany) von Cramm	6	6	6	6
(Switzerland) Ellmer	1	2	8	1

==== Section 4 ====
First round
5	(Czechoslovakia) Menzel	6	4	6
(France) Samazeuilh	3	6	2	r
(France) Landry	6	6	6
(Belgium) La Croix	4	4	1
(Hungary) Von Kehrling	4	5	r
(France) Berthet	6	7
(France) Bernard
(Netherlands) Timmer
12	(Kingdom of Yugoslavia) Punčec	3	6	3	6	3
(France) Jamain	6	2	6	2	6
(Poland) Tłoczyński	6	6	2	6
(France) Bouy	3	1	6	2
(Australia) McGrath	8	6	3	6
(France) Weiss	6	1	6	2
(France) Billaudot	6	5	6	3	6
(India) Fyzee	3	7	0	6	3

Second round
5	(Czechoslovakia) Menzel	6	6	6
(France) Landry	2	3	0
(France) Berthet	6	6	6
(France) Bernard	1	1	1
(France) Jamain	6	0	5	1
(Poland) Tłoczyński	4	6	7	6
(Australia) McGrath	6	8	6	6
(France) Billaudot	3	10	2	4

Third round
5	(Czechoslovakia) Menzel	6	6	6
(France) Berthet	2	3	3
(Poland) Tłoczyński	6	4	6	0	2
(Australia) McGrath	4	6	1	6	6

Fourth round
5	(Czechoslovakia) Menzel	6	6	6
(Australia) McGrath	2	2	3

==== Section 5 ====
First round
(United Kingdom) Lysaght	8	6	6	6
(France) Piel	10	2	3	1
(Switzerland) Mercier-Odier	2	1	2
(France) Rodel	6	6	6
(Belgium) Naeyaert	6	6	6
(France) Lecointre	1	3	0
(France) George	6	10	11	r
11	(Italy) Taroni	3	12	12
(Poland) Hebda	6	6	6
(France) Leven	4	4	2
(Australia) Turnbull	6	6	6
(France) Journu	2	2	2
(Belgium) Ewbank	4	6	6	6
(France) Tenaille	6	2	4	3
(United Kingdom) Gandar-Dower	8	1	1	0
6	(France) Boussus	6	6	6	6

Second round
(United Kingdom) Lysaght	2	7	0	1
(France) Rodel	6	5	6	6
(Belgium) Naeyaert	6	6	2	4	3
11	(Italy) Taroni	1	4	6	6	6
(Poland) Hebda	1	0	4
(Australia) Turnbull	6	6	6
(Belgium) Ewbank	0	1	1
6	(France) Boussus	6	6	6

Third round
(France) Rodel	4	6	6	6
11	(Italy) Taroni	6	3	4	3
(Australia) Turnbull	6	6	4	2	3
6	(France) Boussus	2	4	6	6	6

Fourth round
(France) Rodel
6	(France) Boussus

==== Section 6 ====
First round
(Germany) Tuescher	6	6	6
(United States) Culley	4	1	4
(France) Lesueur	6	6	6
(Monaco) Landau	0	4	2
(France) Lafontan	8	1	1	0
(Italy) Sertorio	6	6	6	6
(Switzerland) Aeschliman	4	4	3
14	(Austria) Artens	6	6	6
(Germany) Denker	6	6	8
(South Africa) Robertson	1	0	6

Second round
(Germany) Tuescher	4	6	10	6	6
(France) Lesueur	6	1	12	0	8
(Italy) Sertorio	6	3	6	3	2
14	(Austria) Artens	4	6	1	6	6
(Germany) Denker
(Czechoslovakia) Siba
(France) Goldschmidt	2	2	1
3	(United Kingdom) Austin	6	6	6

Third round
(France) Lesueur	6	1	10
14	(Austria) Artens	8	6	12
(Germany) Denker	3	3	3
3	(United Kingdom) Austin	6	6	6

Fourth round
14	(Austria) Artens	4	0	3
3	(United Kingdom) Austin	6	6	6

==== Section 7 ====
First round

Second round
(India) Kutch	2	6	5	6	4
(France) Bernard	6	4	7	3	6
(France) Poullain	0	1	0
10	(United Kingdom) Hughes	6	6	6
(France) De Buzelet	5	6	3
(Czechoslovakia) Hecht	7	8	6
(France) Brugnon	4	3	2
7	(United Kingdom) Prenn	6	6	6

Third round
(France) Bernard	4	4	3
10	(United Kingdom) Hughes	6	6	6
(Czechoslovakia) Hecht	2	6	2	7	6
7	(United Kingdom) Prenn	6	1	6	5	3

Fourth round
10	(United Kingdom) Hughes	6	6	2	6
(Czechoslovakia) Hecht	2	3	6	4

==== Section 8 ====
First round

Second round
(France) Destremau
Wheatecroft
15	(United Kingdom) Sleem	6	4	6	6
Nydis	1	6	1	2
(Hungary) Gabrowitz	6	8	0	6	6
(France) Bonte	1	10	6	3	2
(France) Vieillard	4	4	6	0
2	(Australia) Crawford	6	6	4	6

Third round
(France) Destremau	0	1	1
15	(United Kingdom) Sleem	6	6	6
(Hungary) Gabrowitz	2	3	1
2	(Australia) Crawford	6	6	6

Fourth round
15	(United Kingdom) Sleem	6	1	5	0
2	(Australia) Crawford	0	6	7	6

Preceded by 1934 Australian Championships	Grand Slams; Men's Singles	Succeeded by 1934 Wimbledon Championships
