= F Scott =

F Scott may refer to:

- F. R. Scott, Francis Reginald Scott (1899–1985), a Canadian poet, intellectual, and constitutional scholar
- F. Scott Fitzgerald, Francis Scott Key Fitzgerald (September 24, 1896 – December 21, 1940), an American novelist, essayist, short story and screenwriter
- Freda Scott, a former british tennis player – see 1935 Wimbledon Championships – Women's Singles
- Scott M. Freda, DallasFort Worth-area sobriety and nutrition coach, media personality, and entrepreneur.
