= Ardsley Invitation =

Defunct tennis tournament
- Tour: USNLTA Circuit (1916–22); ILTF World Circuit (1923–39)
- Founded: 1913; 113 years ago
- Abolished: 1939; 87 years ago
- Location: Ardsley-on-Hudson, United States
- Venue: The Ardsley Country Club
- Surface: Grass (outdoors)

The Ardsley Invitation was a men's and women's tennis tournament founded in June 1916. It was organised by the Ardsley Country Club (f.1895), Ardsley-on-Hudson, United States and played on grass courts and ran until 1939.

== History ==
In 1895 the Ardsley Club and Casino was founded, and in 1898 it constructed outside grass tennis courts. 12 June 1916 the Ardsley club established a women's invitation tennis tournament. The owners of the club launched the tournament with a view of revving its fortunes in regards to staging prestigious tennis events, previously it had staged three national Intercollegiate Championships. There was no men's singles events, however a mixed doubles invitational tournament was also held along with the women's singles event. The tournament was originally played at part of the USNLTA Circuit from 1916 to 1922, after the United States Lawn Tennis Association joined the International Lawn Tennis Federation the same year, it became part of the ILTF World Circuit from 1923 until 1939 when it was discontinued.

== Finals ==
=== Women's singles ===
(incomplete roll)

Year	Winners	Runners-up	Score
↓ USNLTA Circuit ↓
1916	(United States) Adelaide Browning Green	(United States) Grace Moore LeRoy	6–0, 6–2
1917	(Norway) Molla Bjurstedt	(United States) Marie Wagner	5–7, 7–5, 6–3
1918	(Norway) Molla Bjurstedt (2)	(United States) Adelaide Browning Green	4–6, 6–1, 6–2
1919	(United States) Clare Cassell	(United States) Natalie Browning	6–4, 6–1
1920	(United States) Louise Hammond Raymond	(United States) Marie Wagner	7–5, 6–2
1921	(United States) Molla Bjurstedt Mallory (3)	(United States) Louise Hammond Raymond	6–4, 6–2
1922	(United States) Molla Bjurstedt Mallory (4)	(United States) Mary Browne	6–1, 2–6, 7–5
↓ ILTF World Circuit ↓
1923	(United States) Molla Bjurstedt Mallory (5)	(United Kingdom) Geraldine Beamish	3–6, 6–1, 6–0
1924	(United States) Molla Bjurstedt Mallory (6)	(United States) Adelaide Browning Green	6–0, 6–1
1925	(United States) Molla Bjurstedt Mallory (7)	(United States) Marion Zinderstein Jessup	6–1, 6–4
1927	(United States) Alice Francis	(United States) Louise Hammond Raymond	6–1, 6–4
1928	(United States) Clara Greenspan	(United States) Alice Francis	2–6, 6–3, 6–4
1929	(United States) Norma Taubele	(United States) Ellice Mack Endicott	6–4, 1–6, 6–2
1930	(United States) Norma Taubele (2)	(United States) Alice Francis	7–5, 3–6, 13–11
1931	(United Kingdom) Elsie Goldsack Pittman	(United Kingdom) Joan Ridley	3–6, 6–3, 6–3
1932	(United Kingdom) Joan Ridley	(United States) Alice Francis	6–3, 6–0
1939	(United States) Josephine Sanfilippo	(United States) Nellie Sheer	8–6, 10–12, 6–2
