= Giorgio de Stefani =

Italian tennis player (1904–1992)

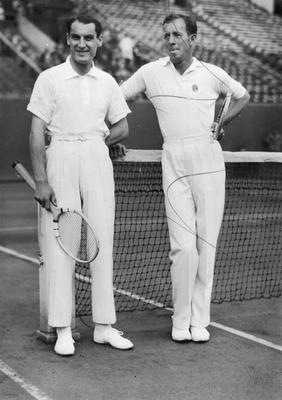
- Giorgio de Stefani (left) and Wilmer Allison (right) during the 1930 International Lawn Tennis Challenge Inter-Zonal Zone final. They hold the record for the most match points saved in a match.
- Country (sports): Italy
- Born: 24 February 1904 Verona, Italy
- Died: 22 October 1992 (aged 88) Rome, Italy
- Turned pro: 1920 (amateur tour)
- Plays: Ambidextrous (forehand both sides)

Singles
- Career titles: 85
- Highest ranking: No. 6 (1934, Literary Digest)

Grand Slam singles results
- Australian Open: QF (1935)
- French Open: F (1932)
- Wimbledon: 4R (1933)

Doubles
- Career titles: 54

Grand Slam doubles results
- Australian Open: QF (1935)
- French Open: QF (1934)
- Wimbledon: 3R (1935, 1937)

Grand Slam mixed doubles results
- Australian Open: 2R (1935)
- French Open: 3R (1932)

Giorgio de Stefani (Italian pronunciation: [ˈdʒordʒo de ˈsteːfani]; 24 February 1904 – 22 October 1992) was an ambidextrous tennis player competing for Italy. In 1934, he was ranked the no. 6 amateur in the world by The Literary Digest and no. 9 by A Wallis Myers. In 1932 he was the second best Italian player, and after the retirement of Umberto de Morpurgo he was the top Italian player from 1933 to 1936 and in 1938. He was active before World War II, winning 85 singles titles. Apart from being Italian champion, he was the Argentine, Dutch, Libyan and Swiss champion as well. After his tennis career he was elected to the International Olympic Committee and was also the head of the Italian and the International Tennis Federation on several occasions.

== Early life ==
Giorgio de Stefani was born in Verona in 1904, son of a Minister of Government. He learned tennis from his mother on the courts of their family house at Lake Garda. He started his amateur career by competing in and winning the Montreux tournament in 1920 at the age of 15. During his student years he won the world university championships in Darmstadt where he defeated Fritz Kuhlmann without losing a set. Although he and Emanuelle Sertorio lost the doubles final to the German student team of Kuhlmann-H. Uthmoller in five sets. Next year he drafted into the inter-college tennis challenge of Villa d'Este in 1931 featuring the joint Harvard-Yale team against the Italian student players where he won one singles match against Robert Ryan and lost one singles against Bill Breese and two doubles. The Americans defeated the Italians nine rubbers to five. At the age of 22 he debuted in the Davis Cup as a reserve player.

== Tennis career ==
1926–1931

It took him several years to repeat his first feat when in 1926 he won the tournament Parc des Eaux Vives in Geneva against Swiss champion Charles Aeschlimann. In 1929 he was a finalist at L.T.C. Beaulieu losing to Italian Uberto De Morpurgo in four sets. At Cannes he beat Benny Berthet of France for his first riviera title. He also won the Bordighera championships against Béla von Kehrling but the Hungarian took revenge in the doubles final. In 1930 he faced and lost to Bill Tilden several times most notably in the Nice final. and in the earlier rounds of the Italian Internationals. They also met in the semifinals of the Italian doubles championships Tilden played with Coen, while Stefani chose Count Ludwig von Salm-Hoogstraeten but Tilden's team prevailed in the end. In Cannes they faced each other two times in a row and Tilden prevailed both times for the Lawn Tennis Club Cannes and New Courts de Cannes titles At his third consecutive Cannes final de Stefani beat Hermann von Artens for the Carlton L. T. C title. In 1931 he became Libyan Champion by beating fellow countryman Alberto Del Bono in the Tripoli final and won the doubles title partnering with him. They'd also won the Campionato Partenopeo doubles title. In September he claimed his second Montreux trophy.

1932–1937

In 1932 he reached the semifinals of the Pacific Southwest Tournament as the honorary member of the Italian Olympic team. In doubles he and Ellsworth Vines fell to Gene Mako and Takeo Kubawara in the final. The same year he won the doubles title at the Italian Internationals partnering Pat Hughes. and also won the Cannes L.T.C. doubles title. He was a contender for the Cannes singles title as well but the match against Ignacy Tłoczyński remained unplayed, although their follow up match for the cup of the Nizza L.T.C was finished with De Stefani victorious. All these achievements earned him the second spot on the top Italian tennis players' list. In 1933 he was a challenger for another Montreux title but finished second against Gottfried von Cramm but did win the doubles trophy against the German duo Cramm-Lund. The following years he clinched and defended successfully the upcoming Dutch Championships four consecutive times, first in 1933, then in 1934, 1935 and 1936. In 1934 he was the finalist for both singles and doubles at the Italian Internationals losing both times to Davis Cup teammate Giovanni Palmieri. and he also reached the same result in the Monte Carlo Championships. In 1935 he was crowned Argentine champion after clinching the International tournament in Buenos Aires. In 1937 he was a runner-up for the Cairo International Championships only losing to Henner Henkel in straight sets.

Overall

He represented his country in the Italy Davis Cup team in 1927 and kept being drafted until the outbreak of World War II. In the Cup he compiled a 44/22 (66%) winning record. His most successful year was in the 1930 International Lawn Tennis Challenge, where they reached the Inter-Zonal Zone round of the tournament. In that final match against the United States Davis Cup team he and Wilmer Allison set and still hold the record for the most match points saved in a match with De Stefani losing after failing to convert 18 match balls.

He was the top Italian player five times from 1933 to 1936 and in 1938. He was No. 8 in Europe in 1931 according to the Züricher Sport newspaper and reached the same rank in 1935 on the list of Heinrich Kleinschroth, a former German champion and Davis Cup player.

De Stefani finished runner-up to Henri Cochet in the singles final of the Amateur French Championships of Roland-Garros in 1932.

During his 30-year career he won 150 tournaments including the Italian national championships in singles, doubles and mixed doubles.

=== Rivalry with Fred Perry ===
British Fred Perry and De Stefani met several times in their careers. Their first meeting was in the 1931 French Championships fourth round, where Stefani overcame Perry in four sets. In their 1932 Pacific Southwest Tournament semifinals rematch Perry equalized their tally and went on to face Jiro Sato for the title. In their third encounter in the 1933 International Lawn Tennis Challenge where Great Britain defeated Italy with Stefani winning the only rubber of that quarterfinal. Their most controversial match came in the 1934 French Championships quarterfinal where Stefani led two sets to one with Perry leading in the fourth to force a deciding set, when the Briton fell awkwardly while running to the net and hurt his ankle. Subsequently Perry tried fix the match with Stefani. He wanted to lose as a noble thus offering his Italian opponent "an honourable victory" if they avoid long, wide rallies that would damage his ankle more. According to Perry it was Stefani who rushed to help him up when this happened. Subsequently Stefani turned and took the fourth and final set, but Perry recalled it as a gentleman affair, where Stefani stuck to their plan all the time. Right after the match Perry collapsed and had to be carried to the dressing room where the doctors diagnosed him with a sprained ankle. Although Perry swore to take revenge on him the next time they play again. Thus in return, on their next match-up in the quarterfinal of the Australian Championships in Melbourne Perry crushed the Italian, ruining his best oversees result and giving him the biggest loss of his life with a score of 6–0, 6–0, 6–0. He also stopped him in the doubles contest quarterfinals as well with a straight sets victory. Perry stated later that "That determination was part of my character". Three years later The Glasgow Herald described their relationship as Stefani being the hoodoo to Perry's career. Perry eventually went on to become the 1934 world amateur number one. Perry turned pro after the 1936 season, while de Stefani got more and more involved in sports diplomacy.

== Hiatus during the second World War ==
After the outbreak of the war tennis tournaments and sport in general were neglected. As an attempt to reorganize the Italian sports life count Alberto Bonacossa offered him the position of Regent of the Presidential Committee of tennis, which Stefani accepted and held in 1943, however as Italy's war involvement escalated, it forced him to leave his office. He fled from Rome and joined the Italian resistance movement of Breuil-Cervinia. He surrendered to General Harold Alexander with the aid of the partisans, who helped him to make contact with the English forces. He was transferred to the Montreux internment camp thereafter. Fortunately the Mayor of Montreux heard news about his presence and pleaded for him to be released to a hospital.

== Sports diplomat career ==
Giorgio de Stefani

8th President of the Federazione Italiana Tennis.
- In office 1958–1969
- Preceded by: Aldo Tolusso
- Succeeded by: Luigi Orsini

President of the International Tennis Federation.
- In office 1955–1956
- Preceded by: Russell Kingman
- Succeeded by: Roy Youdale
- In office 1962–1963
- Preceded by: Roy Youdale
- Succeeded by: Eaton Griffith
- In office 1967–1969
- Preceded by: Paulo da Silva Costa
- Succeeded by: B A Barnett

Personal details
- Spouse: Maria Carolina di Marchesi Spinola
- Relations: Alberto De Stefani (uncle)
- Children: Emanuele de Stefani (22 December 1958).
- Education: University of Rome
- Profession: Lawyer
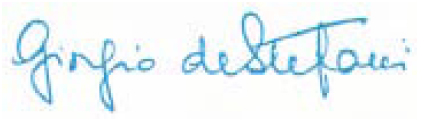
- Signature

De Stefani later became a sports official, was invited and elected in August 1951 on the International Olympic Committee (IOC). In 1966 he initiated the reintroduction of tennis at the Summer Olympics at the IOC meeting in Melbourne and eventually succeeded when eleven votes had been discarded. The President of the IOC, oppositional Avery Brundage protested to the outcome and demanded a new voting process due to fabricated technical errors made in the previous one. In the end the initiative was rejected and tennis was only readmitted to the Olympics in 1988. In 1967 when he was the president of the International Lawn Tennis Federation (ILTF) in the debate on the status of Open tennis tournaments, especially accepting Wimbledon as an official Open Grand Slam he sided with the ban of the said tournament threatening the Lawn Tennis Association of getting expelled from the Federation and having its championships cancelled. The next year he opposed to allow professionals to enter into the Davis Cup competitions. Allegedly he even convinced Italian number one Nicola Pietrangeli with financial means to devote himself exclusively to amateur tennis and never turn professional. He was also an abolitionist for the challenge round in Davis Cup and the choice of field by the finalists but failed to succeed in these issues.

He served as chairman of the ILTF in 1955 and 1956, 1962 and 1963, and from 1967 to 1969, and also as president of the Italian Tennis Federation, where he stayed from 1958 to 1969.

== Playing style ==
Giorgio de Stefani was an ambidextrous player, which allowed him to switch his racquet from one hand to another to always return a forehand shot. As a result, he didn't have a backhand stroke. He was thus unpredictable and even players failed to recognize this trick sometimes even for multiple sets. He could also benefit from this ability in serving when he was able to easily change the serve direction. He asked for a permission to use two racquets simultaneously, one in each hand, but it was officially banned in 1931 by the ILTF. Although when playing golf his preferred shot was with his right hand as well as while serving. In one of his articles written to The Sydney Morning Herald, Fred Perry described Stefani as a "freak player" and his style as unorthodox and that he lacks the beauty of shot execution of those as Bunny Austin and Jack Crawford. He further described his service and his volleying as weak, his physique as medium and his condition well enough to be able to run around the whole match. Thanks to his ambidextrous nature he possessed good passing shot skills. His forehands were solid but they lacked pace although his right hand was somewhat more accurate. Stefani was a hard court specialist accommodated to hot weather.

== Personal life ==
Apart from playing amateur tennis he was a devoted mountain-climber and occasional golfer. He served his voluntary military service in 1930. His uncle was the politician Alberto De Stefani, who was the Minister of Finance, but was removed by Benito Mussolini due to their ideological differences. Giorgio was awarded the title Knight of the Order of the Crown of Italy for his sports achievements. He graduated at the University of Rome earning a doctorate in law. In 1956 he married Maria Carolina di Marchesi Spinola. His first child died. In his retirement years he received the "Atleti Azzuri" Trophy for his sports merits.

== Grand Slam finals ==
=== Singles (1 runner-up) ===
Result	Year	Championship	Surface	Opponent	Score
Loss	1932	French Championships	Clay	(France) Henri Cochet	0–6, 4–6, 6–4, 3–6

== See also ==
- Performance timelines for all male tennis players who reached at least one Grand Slam final
