= Max Bertram =

South African tennis player (1911–1999)

- Full name: Robert Henry Maxwell Bertram
- Country (sports): South Africa
- Born: 11 February 1911
- Died: 2 August 1999 (aged 88)
- Plays: Right-handed

Singles

Grand Slam singles results
- French Open: 2R (1935)
- Wimbledon: 2R (1935)

Doubles

Grand Slam doubles results
- Wimbledon: QF (1935)

Robert Henry Maxwell Bertram (11 February 1911 – 2 August 1999) was a South African tennis player.

Born in Roodepoort, Bertram was active in tennis during the 1930s and 1940s. His game was based on a strong forehand drive, similar in style to Bill Johnston. In 1932 he won the singles title at the South African Championships, where he was also runner-up three times. He toured Europe in 1935 and represented South Africa in a Davis Cup tie against Czechoslovakia in Prague, featuring as well at the French Championships and Wimbledon.

Bertram's son Byron twice won the Wimbledon junior title and played on the professional tour.

== See also ==
- List of South Africa Davis Cup team representatives
