= 1935 Wimbledon Championships =

- Date: 24 June – 6 July
- Edition: 55th
- Category: Grand Slam
- Surface: Grass
- Location: Church Road; SW19, Wimbledon, London, United Kingdom
- Venue: All England Lawn Tennis and Croquet Club

Champions

Men's singles
- (United Kingdom) Fred Perry

Women's singles
- (United States) Helen Moody

Men's doubles
- (Australia) Jack Crawford / (Australia) Adrian Quist

Women's doubles
- (United Kingdom) Freda James / (United Kingdom) Kay Stammers

Mixed doubles
- (United Kingdom) Fred Perry / (United Kingdom) Dorothy Round
- Wimbledon Championships

The 1935 Wimbledon Championships took place on the outdoor grass courts at the All England Lawn Tennis and Croquet Club in Wimbledon, London, United Kingdom. The tournament was held from Monday 24 June until Saturday 6 July 1935. It was the 55th staging of the Wimbledon Championships, and the third Grand Slam tennis event of 1935. Fred Perry and Helen Moody won the singles titles.

This was the final Wimbledon tournament during the reign of King George V.

== Finals ==
=== Men's singles ===
(United Kingdom) Fred Perry defeated (Germany) Gottfried von Cramm, 6–2, 6–4, 6–4

=== Women's singles ===
(United States) Helen Moody defeated (United States) Helen Jacobs, 6–3, 3–6, 7–5

=== Men's doubles ===
(Australia) Jack Crawford / (Australia) Adrian Quist defeated (United States) Wilmer Allison / (United States) John Van Ryn, 6–3, 5–7, 6–2, 5–7, 7–5

=== Women's doubles ===
(United Kingdom) Freda James / (United Kingdom) Kay Stammers defeated (France) Simonne Mathieu / (Denmark) Hilde Sperling, 6–1, 6–4

=== Mixed doubles ===
(United Kingdom) Fred Perry / (United Kingdom) Dorothy Round defeated (Australia) Harry Hopman / (Australia) Nell Hopman, 7–5, 4–6, 6–2

Preceded by 1935 French Championships	Grand Slams	Succeeded by 1935 U.S. National Championships
