= Josip Palada =

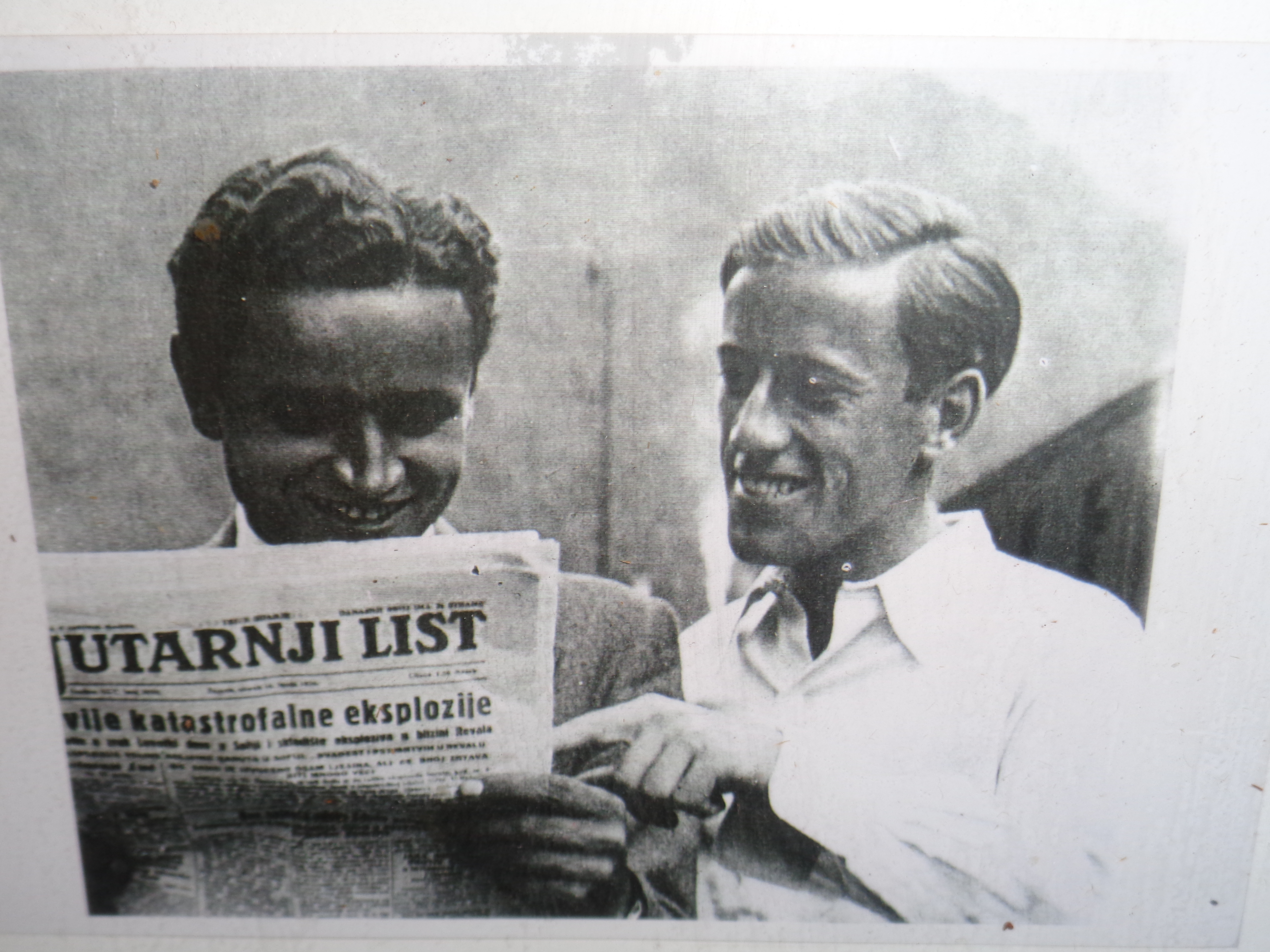
- Palada (right) reading newspapers together with Franjo Punčec
- Country (sports): Yugoslavia
- Born: 5 February 1912 Zagreb, Austria-Hungary
- Died: 4 May 1994 (aged 82) Zagreb, Croatia
- Turned pro: 1932 (amateur tour)
- Retired: 1956
- Plays: Left-handed (one-handed backhand)

Singles
- Career record: 199–124
- Career titles: 20

Grand Slam singles results
- French Open: SF (1938)
- Wimbledon: 4R (1935)
- US Open: 2R (1939)

Grand Slam doubles results
- Wimbledon: SF (1938, 1946)

Grand Slam mixed doubles results
- Wimbledon: 3R (1935, 1937)

Josip Palada (Serbo-Croatian Cyrillic: Јосип Палада, pronounced [jǒsip palǎːda]; 5 February 1912 – 4 May 1994) was a Yugoslavian tennis player.

== Early life and family ==
Palada was born in Zagreb and started to play tennis at the age of fifteen on the courts of the Neurological Clinic of the Faculty of Medicine in Zagreb. He was hired as a ball boy by the doctors of the clinic. His talent was discovered by doctor of rheumatology Drago Čop, later a Davis Cup captain and president of the Yugoslav Tennis Association. Palada began practising with "Star" racquets on a daily basis. He was a self-taught player and trained by playing squash alone. He made his first international appearance at a Budapest–Zagreb inter-club match. He began working as a state official in the meantime.

== Tennis career ==
Palada debuted in the Kingdom of Yugoslavia Davis Cup team in 1933. The team's first big tour was a visit to India in the winter of 1934. Palada won tournaments in Bombay, including the India International Championships in Calcutta, and Allahabad; in the latter final he defeated Franjo Punčec and won the championship of India. In 1937 Palada traveled to South Africa, where he became the champion of the South African international tournament. He became a worldwide sensation in 1938, visiting and winning in various continents such as the Irish Open, where he partnered with George Lyttleton-Rogers in the men's doubles, and the Scandinavia covered courts championship in Helsinki, teaming with Punčec. He even competed in Buenos Aires, in the championships of South America, and was runner-up, losing the final to Punčec. At the 1938 French championships, Palada beat Ladislav Hecht and Christian Boussus before losing in the semi-finals to Don Budge. In 1940 Palada won, among many championships, the National Championship of Denmark in Copenhagen. The Nazi invasion of Yugoslavia caught Punčec and Palada by surprise while they were playing in the French Riviera.

Palada continued with good results in tournaments. He defeated many renowned players such as Giovanni Cucelli, Torsten Johansson, Philippe Washer, Władysław Skonecki, Lennart Bergelin, Billy Knight, and Jean Borotra. His roll of honour included trophies from Ostend, Saarbrücken, Lübeck, Dijon, and several others with partner Dragutin Mitić in international doubles tournaments. At the end of his successful career, Palada twice won the Yugoslavian title (1952, 1955), despite being over forty years of age. He retired from tennis in 1956 at the age of 44.

Palada went on to a successful career as coach and teacher, transferring his rich experience to younger generations. He was later appointed the official selector and captain and trainer of the Davis Cup team of his country. Under his leadership, the team achieved significant success in 1963 by winning the King's Cup.

== Works cited ==
=== Primary ===
- Šoškić, Čedomir (2012). Тениски савез Србије Тенис без граници 1922–2012. [Tennis Association of Serbia, Tennis without borders 1922–2012] (PDF) (in Serbian). Belgrade, Serbia: Tennis Association of Serbia. pp. 273–279. Archived from the original (PDF) on 30 December 2013 – via tennispress.rs.

=== Secondary ===
- "Norddeutscher Lloyd passenger list". die-maus-bremen.de (in German). Bremen, Germany: Chamber of Commerce and the State Archive of Bremen. 11 August 1939.
