= Jack Lysaght =

British tennis player

- Full name: John Frederick Gerald Lysaght
- Country (sports): Great Britain
- Born: 27 September 1906
- Died: 7 April 1954 (aged 47)

Singles

Grand Slam singles results
- French Open: 2R (1934)
- Wimbledon: 3R (1933, 1934)

Doubles

Grand Slam doubles results
- Wimbledon: 2R (1934, 1935, 1937, 1938)

Grand Slam mixed doubles results
- Wimbledon: 4R (1938)

John Frederick Gerald Lysaght (27 September 1906 – 7 April 1954) was a British tennis player.

Lysaght, an Oxford Blue, came from a wealthy Somerset family. His father Gerald was an industrialist and a significant donor to Ernest Shackleton, accompanying the explorer to Cape Verde as a helmsman on the 1921 Quest Expedition. The family occupied Chapel Cleeve Manor in Somerset. Active on tour in the 1930s, Lysaght was known for his considerable height and twice reached the singles third round of the Wimbledon Championships.
