= Marcel Rainville =

Canadian tennis player (1903–1949)

- Country (sports): Canada
- Born: June 30, 1903
- Died: June 21, 1949 (aged 45)

Singles

Grand Slam singles results
- French Open: 1R (1935)
- Wimbledon: 1R (1935)
- US Open: 4R (1934)

Marcel Rainville (June 30, 1903 – June 21, 1949) was a Canadian tennis player.

A native of Montreal, Rainville was the number one ranked player in Canada in 1932 and 1934. He won the singles title at the Canadian Championships in 1934, beating Hal Surface in the final. His Davis Cup career, which spanned 1930 to 1934, included a surprise five-set win over Sidney Wood in 1931, which was the first time a Canadian had won a rubber against the United States. He made the singles fourth round of the 1934 U.S. National Championships.

Rainville had a law degree from the University of Montreal.

In 1949, Rainville's body was found in Montreal harbour, with police concluding that he had committed suicide.

Rainville was posthumously inducted into the Tennis Canada Hall of Fame in 1993.

== See also ==
- List of Canada Davis Cup team representatives
