= Kenneth Gandar Dower =

English sportsman, aviator, explorer and author

Kenneth Gandar-Dower
- Full name: Kenneth Cecil Gandar-Dower
- Country (sports): Great Britain
- Born: 31 August 1908 Marylebone, London, England
- Died: 12 February 1944 (aged 35) SS Khedive Ismail, Indian Ocean

Grand Slam singles results
- French Open: 1R (1934)
- Wimbledon: 3R (1930, 1936)

Grand Slam doubles results
- Wimbledon: 3R (1932, 1934, 1935, 1936)

Grand Slam mixed doubles results
- Wimbledon: 3R (1935)
Medal record
Men's squash
British Amateur Championships
Gold medal – first place	1938/1939	singles

Kenneth Cecil Gandar-Dower (31 August 1908 – 12 February 1944) was a leading English sportsman, aviator, explorer and author.

Born at his parents' home in Regent's Park, London, Gandar-Dower was the fourth and youngest son of independently wealthy tea merchant Joseph Wilson Gandar-Dower and his wife Amelia Frances Germaine. Two of his elder brothers, Eric and Alan Gandar Dower, served as Conservative Members of Parliament. Other brothers include Ronald, Leonard and Harold. All used different versions of their surname: Gandar-Dower, Gandar Dower and Dower respectively.

== Education ==
Gandar-Dower was educated at Windlesham House School and Harrow School, where he played cricket, association football, Eton fives and rackets and, with Terence Rattigan, wrote for The Harrovian. He then received a scholarship to Trinity College, Cambridge in 1927 to read history, gaining an upper second. There, he won athletic blues in billiards, tennis and real tennis, Rugby fives, Eton fives and rackets. In addition, Gandar-Dower edited Granta magazine and chaired the Trinity debating society.

== Sporting career ==
Gandar-Dower became a leading tennis player, competing in a number of tournaments throughout the 1930s, including Wimbledon and the French Championships. He was nicknamed "The Undying Retriever" for his ability to run large distances during matches.

At the 1932 Queen's Club Championship in London Gandar-Dower had his greatest tennis success (SIGMA, 1936) when he defeated Harry Hopman in three sets. Newspaper reports stated that he "had Hopman perplexed with his unorthodox game and the number of astonishingly low volleys from apparently impossible positions."

Gandar-Dower also won the British Amateur Squash Championships in 1938 and continued to play cricket competitively throughout the 1930s.

Gandar-Dower twice won the principal trophy in Eton Fives – the Kinnaird Cup – in 1929 and 1932, and was in the defeated pair in the 1931 final.

Gandar-Dower caused a reputation for himself in real tennis through his tactic of getting to the net as quickly as possible and volleying everything in sight. This was frowned upon by traditionalists and it was considered that Gandar-Dower "disrupted the game for a while".

== Aviator ==
In June 1932, with minimal flying experience, Gandar-Dower entered the King's Cup Air Race and "soon became one of the most colourful aviators of his era", making one of the first flights from England to India with "the help of a friend, A.C.S. Irwin, late of the RAF and now an estate-agent in Brewer Street and as fine a specimen of charming, efficient, athletic thirty-five as I have been privileged to know".

The flight was made in a second-hand Puss Moth, registration G-AAVA (see entry 2002 for details of the plane). The sequence of events were Gandar-Dower passed his flying tests in May, flew the King's Cup in June, and in October left for Madras with Irwin. Both men were promised "a free month in the jungle hunting tigers" by Irwin's father as an incentive to arrive intact.

== Explorer ==
In 1934 Gandar-Dower led an expedition to Mount Kenya and the Aberdare Range in an attempt to capture a marozi, a spotted lion rumoured to exist. While he failed to capture or photograph a marozi (which remains unconfirmed), Gandar-Dower did find three sets of tracks which he believed to be marozi and reported that locals differentiated marozi from lions or leopards. In 1937, Gandar-Dower authored a book on the subject, The Spotted Lion.

He spent 1935 and 1936 in the Belgian Congo and Kenya, where he climbed active volcanoes and produced a definitive map of Mount Sattima.

== Cheetah racing ==
Gandar-Dower returned to England in 1937 with twelve cheetahs with the intention of introducing cheetah racing to Great Britain. After six months' quarantine and six months' adapting themselves to the changed climatic conditions at Harringay and Staines stadia, the cheetahs first raced at Romford Greyhound Stadium on Saturday 11 December 1937. Specially timed trials had taken place where the cheetahs clipped seconds off almost every greyhound record. On 13 December a cheetah by the name of Helen covered the distance of 265 yards in a record time of 15.86sec but in the second race won by Gussie, the second cheetah James stopped and refused to chase the hare. Helen had previously covered 355 yards in 19.8secs.

However the cheetah racing failed after just one more attempt because the cheetahs were not competitive and had no interest in pursuing the hare and could not negotiate tight bends. Gandar-Dower also caused uproar at the Queen's Club when he brought a male cheetah into the bar on a leash.

== Writing career ==
Gandar-Dower was also a successful author, writing about his adventures. His titles include:

- Amateur Adventure, based on his flight to India. It was published in hardback by Rich & Cowan, Limited in 1934, and in paperback by Penguin in 1939 (no. 198). In a contemporary book review, Flight Magazine wrote that Gandar-Dower "produced an amusing record of his adventures ... that nearly everyone will recommend their friends to read."
- The Spotted Lion, published in 1937 by Heinemann and in paperback in 1940 by Evergreen Books, recorded Gandar-Dower's search for the marozi through Kenya. The Spotted Lion has been credited with bringing the marozi to the attention of the world.
- Inside Britain and Outside Britain were co-written in 1938 with James Riddell. Satires, they are described as having "much gentle irony and are occasionally clairvoyant in their political speculation."
- Into Madagascar, published in 1943, is a history/travelogue, in which he reports that the nineteenth century Malagasy monarch Queen Ranavalona I had "a passion for sewing her subjects up in sacks and making use of the first-class facilities offered by her capital in the matter of vertical drops."
- Abyssinian Patchwork: An Anthology, written and compiled by Gandar-Dower when attached to the East African Command during the Abyssinian Campaign in 1940–41. While he wrote the introduction in Nairobi in 1943 the book was published posthumously by Frederick Muller Ltd in 1949. It contained essays by various participants in the campaign and covered, amongst many subjects, the mistreatment of Ethiopians under Italian Fascism.

In addition he wrote The King’s African Rifles in Madagascar (Privately printed, East Africa Command, Kenya, 1943), Askaris at War in Abyssinia (His Majesty's Stationery Office, 1943) and The First to be Freed (His Majesty's Stationery Office, 1944). Both First to be Freed and Abyssinian Patchwork were published posthumously.

== World War II ==
At the outbreak of World War II Gandar-Dower was in the Belgian Congo photographing gorillas and other animals with his friend James Riddell. The latter published the results in the 1948 book "In the Forests of the Night" which he dedicated to his friend who had died four years earlier. Returning to England, he then worked on the Mass-Observation project with Tom Harrisson before being hired by the Government of Kenya to improve its public relations with the native inhabitants, producing a number of works that the government considered "excellent". Later he acted as a war correspondent, covering campaigns in Abyssinia and Madagascar, travelling vast distances by bicycle and canoe. During the unresisted assault on Tamatave in eastern Madagascar he leapt from an amphibious vessel wearing a 'Bombay Bowler' hat (a type of pith helmet), carrying a camera in one hand and typewriter in the other.

On 6 February 1944 Gandar-Dower boarded the SS Khedive Ismail at Kilindini Harbour at Mombasa, bound for Colombo. While approaching Addu Atoll in the Maldives, on 12 February 1944, the vessel was attacked by Japanese submarine I-27. Struck by two torpedoes, the Khedive Ismail sank in two minutes, with a death toll of 1297, Gandar-Dower among them.

Gandar-Dower's obituary in Wisden stated that "he was one of the most versatile player of games of any period." A wealthy man, Gandar-Dower left over £75,000 in his will.
