= Betty Couper =

British tennis player

- Country (sports): Great Britain

Singles

Grand Slam singles results
- Wimbledon: 3R (1931)

Doubles

Grand Slam doubles results
- Wimbledon: 3R (1936)

Grand Slam mixed doubles results
- Wimbledon: 2R (1935, 1946)

Betty Couper (née Soames) was a British tennis player who appeared at eight Wimbledon Championships. In 1931, she reached the third round of the ladies singles.
