= Elsie Goldsack Pittman =

English tennis player

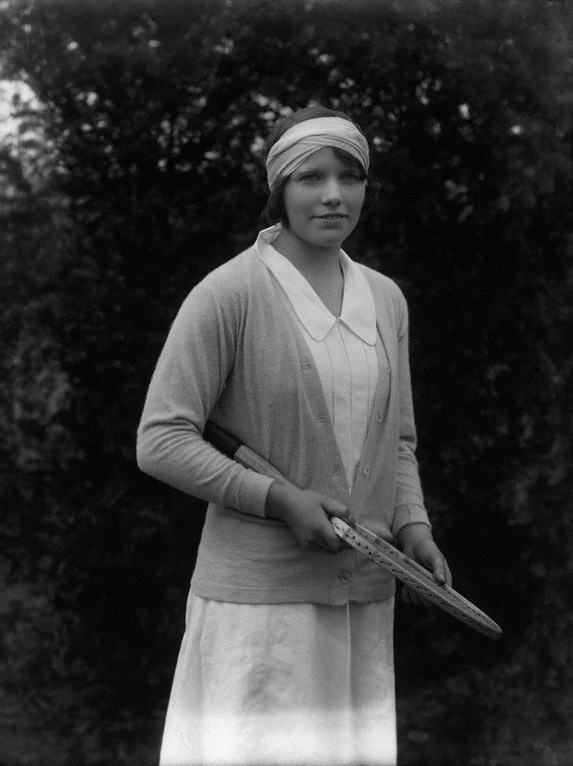
- Full name: Elsie Alice Goldsack Pittman
- Country (sports): United Kingdom
- Born: 21 January 1904 Brockley, Lewisham, England
- Died: 28 March 1975 (aged 71)

Singles
- Highest ranking: No.10 (1929)

Grand Slam singles results
- French Open: 2R (1929)
- Wimbledon: SF (1929)
- US Open: SF (1932)

Doubles

Grand Slam doubles results
- French Open: QF (1929)
- Wimbledon: F (1937)
- US Open: QF (1932)

Grand Slam mixed doubles results
- French Open: SF (1929)
- Wimbledon: QF (1930, 1931)
- US Open: SF (1932)

Elsie Goldsack Pittman (née Goldsack; 21 January 1904 – 28 March 1975) was an English tennis player who competed during the second half of the 1920s and the 1930s.

Between 1925 and 1939, she participated in 15 Wimbledon Championships. Her best result in the singles event was reaching the semifinal in 1929 in which she was defeated in straight sets by top-seeded and eventual champion Helen Wills. In the mixed doubles, she reached the quarterfinals in 1930 and 1931. Her biggest success at Grand Slam level came in 1937 when she partnered with Phyllis Mudford King to reach the final of the 1937 Wimbledon Championships, which they lost to Simonne Mathieu and Billie Yorke in straight sets.

In 1932, she reached the semifinals of the singles event at the U.S. National Championships, losing to top-seeded and eventual champion Helen Jacobs. During the same tournament, she reached the semifinals of the mixed doubles event. The same year, she won the singles title at the Eastern Grass Court Championships in Rye, New York after defeating Joan Ridley in the final.

In September 1931, she won the singles title at the Ardsley Invitation tournament at the Ardsley Club. In 1931 and 1932, she won the Middle States Championships, defeating compatriot Joan Ridley both times in the final.

On 4 January 1930, she married J.B. Pittman.

== Grand Slam finals ==
=== Doubles: 1 (1 runner-up) ===
Result	Year	Championship	Surface	Partner	Opponents	Score
Loss	1937	Wimbledon	Grass	(United Kingdom) Phyllis Mudford King	(France) Simonne Mathieu (United Kingdom) Billie Yorke	3–6, 3–6
