= Mildred Freeman =

British tennis player

- Full name: Mildred Edith Nonweiler Freeman
- Country (sports): United Kingdom
- Born: 11 May 1908 Tokyo, Japan
- Died: 15 December 2003 Surrey, England

Singles

Grand Slam singles results
- Wimbledon: 2R (1931, 1933)

Doubles

Grand Slam doubles results
- Wimbledon: 2R (1931, 1934, 1935, 1937, 1946)

Grand Slam mixed doubles results
- Wimbledon: 3R (1937)

Mildred Edith Freeman (née Nonweiler; 11 May 1908 – 15 December 2003) was a British tennis player who appeared at eight Wimbledon Championships. She reached the third round of the mixed doubles in 1937.

She participated in the singles event of Wimbledon Championships from 1931 to 1935 and her singles record was two wins and five losses.

She married William Frank Freeman on 26 July 1934.
