= Enrique Maier =

Spanish tennis player (1910–1981)

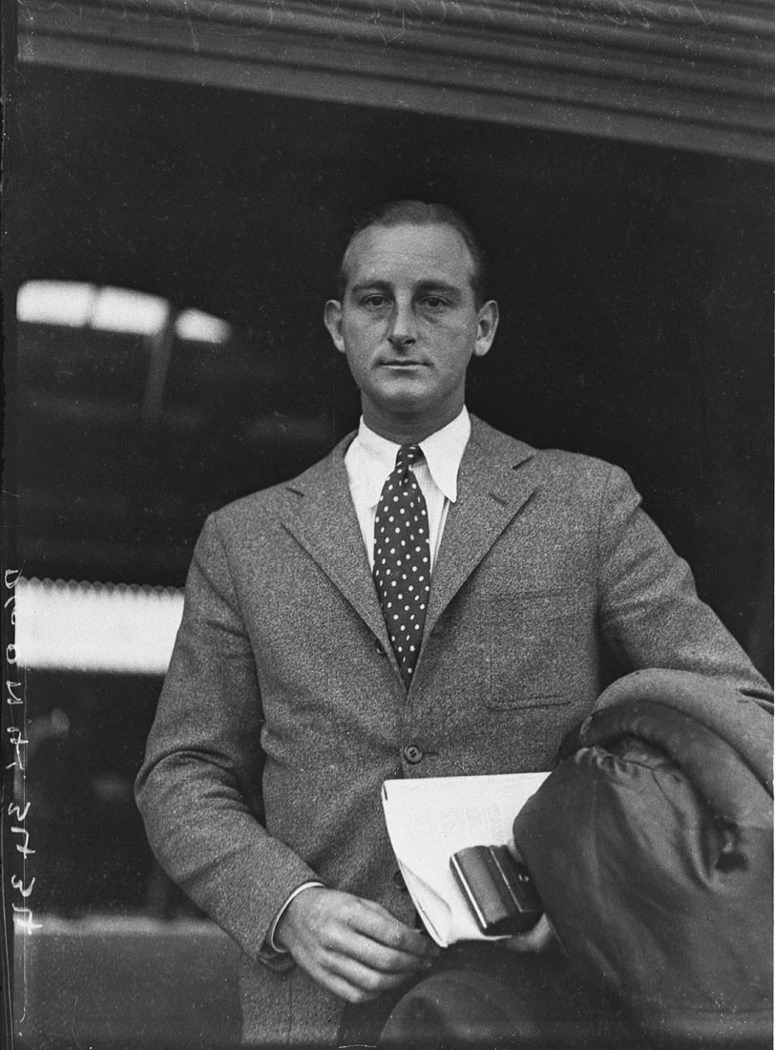
- Full name: Enrique Gerardo Maier Müller
- Country (sports): / Spain
- Born: 31 December 1910 Barcelona, Spain
- Died: August 22, 1981 (aged 70) Madrid, Spain
- Height: 1.90 m (6 ft 3 in)
- Plays: Right-handed (one-handed backhand)

Singles

Grand Slam singles results
- Australian Open: 3R (1935)
- French Open: 3R (1935)
- Wimbledon: QF (1932)
- US Open: QF (1935)

Doubles

Grand Slam doubles results
- Australian Open: SF (1935)
- Wimbledon: QF (1935)

Grand Slam mixed doubles results
- Australian Open: 2R (1935)
- Wimbledon: W (1932)
- US Open: W (1935)

Enrique 'Bubi' Maier (December 31, 1910 – August 22, 1981) was a male Spanish tennis player who was mainly active in the 1930s.

== Biography ==
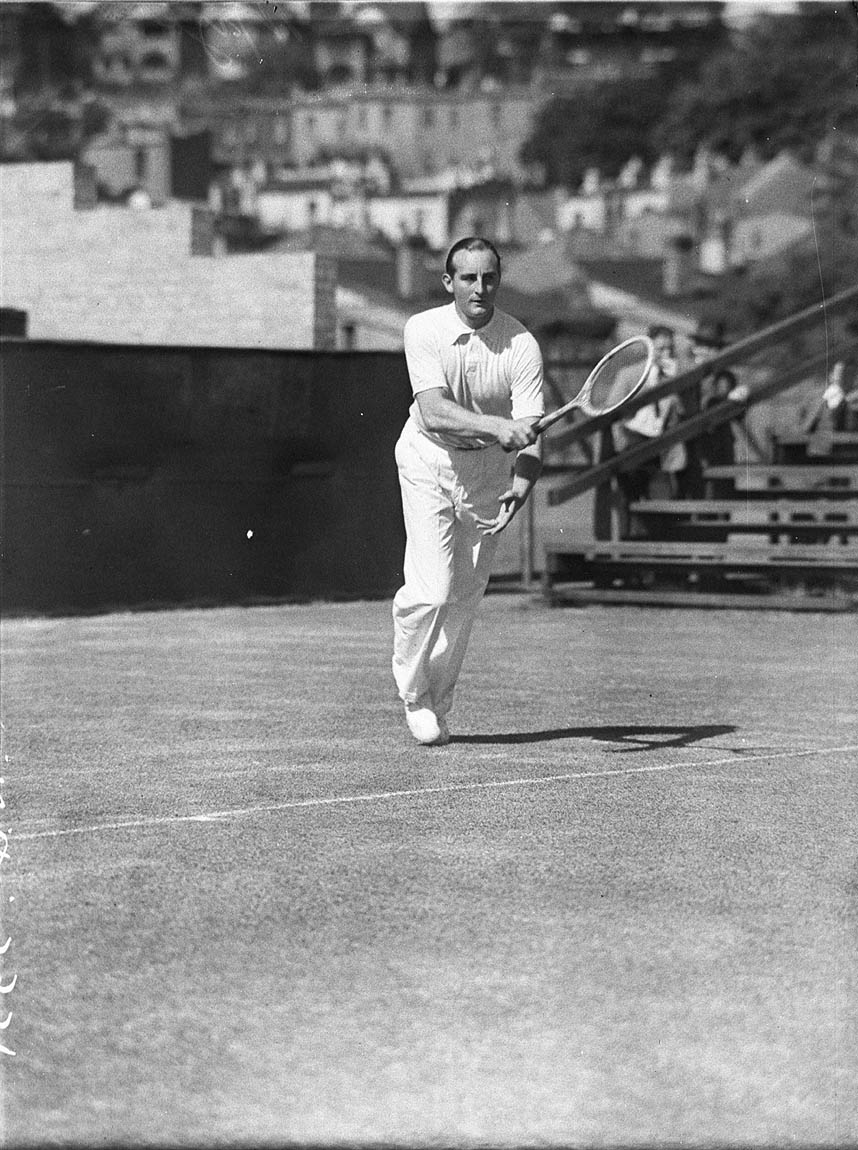
Enrique Maier in Australia

Maier became Wimbledon champion in the mixed doubles in 1932 when, partnered with Elizabeth Ryan, they defeated Harry Hopman and Josane Sigart in straight sets. He was the first Spanish male player to win a Wimbledon title. In that same year he also reached the quarterfinals of the singles championship, beating Frenchman Jean Borotra along the way, and losing to eventual champion Ellsworth Vines.

In 1935 he competed in the mixed doubles competition at the U.S. National Championships held at the Longwood Cricket Club (Boston, Massachusetts) together with the American Sarah Palfrey. They won the title by beating the Czechoslovak-British pair Roderick Menzel / Kay Stammers in three sets.

Maier competed in the Davis Cup for the first time in 1929 against Germany and in total competed in nine ties in which he won and lost 13 matches.

== Personal life ==
He was the son of Otto Maier who played for FC Barcelona, and his wife, Anna Elizabeth Müller.

== Grand Slam finals ==
=== Mixed doubles (2 titles) ===
Result	Year	Championship	Surface	Partner	Opponents	Score
Win	1932	Wimbledon	Grass	(United States) Elizabeth Ryan	(Belgium) Josane Sigart (Australia) Harry Hopman	7–5, 6–2
Win	1935	U.S. Championships	Grass	(United States) Sarah Palfrey	(United Kingdom) Kay Stammers (Czechoslovakia) Roderick Menzel	6–4, 4–6, 6–3
