= Hermann Artens =

Austrian tennis player

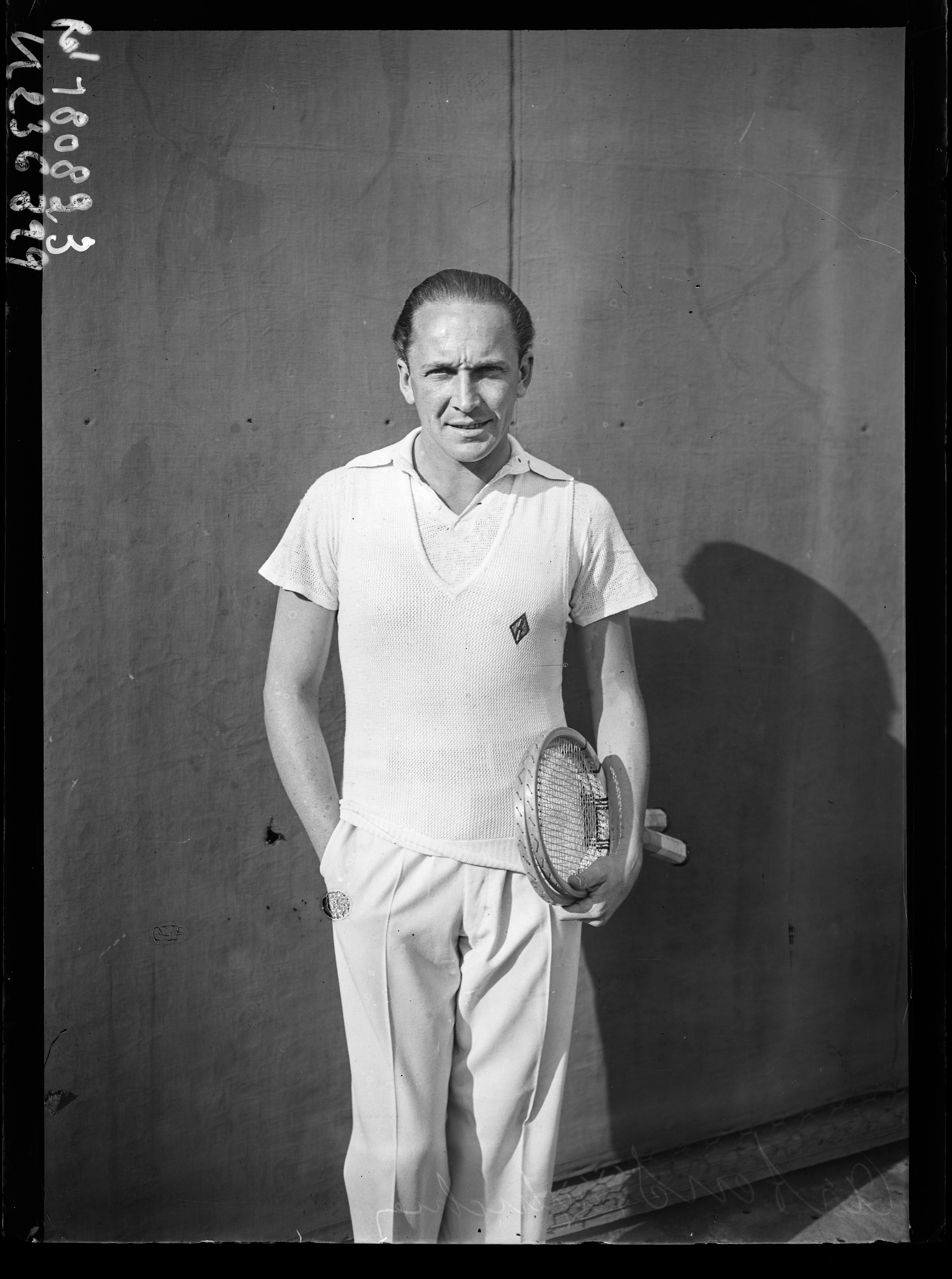
- Full name: Hermann von Artens
- Country (sports): Austria
- Born: 25 June 1904 Graz, Austria
- Died: 28 February 1979 Chile
- Plays: Right-handed

Grand Slam singles results
- French Open: 4R (1929, 1931, 1934)
- Wimbledon: 4R (1931)

Hermann von Artens (25 June 1904 – 18 february 1979) was an Austrian tennis player.

A native of Graz, Artens competed for the Austria Davis Cup team from 1927 to 1934, as the side's first ever Styrian representative. His regular Davis Cup teammate was Franz Matejka.

Artens won the singles title at the South of France Championships in 1927 and made the fourth round of the French Championships on three occasions. Before Thomas Muster, he held the national record for most matches won at Roland Garros (15). He became the first Austrian to reach the Wimbledon fourth round in 1931 and was the 1934 All England Plate winner. In 1935 he won the singles and doubles titles at the Welsh Championships.

At the end of 1935, he moved to Buenos Aires where he had found a job. He ended his career at the beginning of the following year.

== See also ==
- List of Austria Davis Cup team representatives
