= Josef Caska =

Czech tennis player (1913–1981)

- Country (sports): Czechoslovakia
- Born: 2 September 1913 Náchod, Austria-Hungary
- Died: 26 February 1981 (aged 67)

Singles

Grand Slam singles results
- French Open: 4R (1935)
- Wimbledon: 4R (1936)

Josef Caska (2 September 1913 – 26 February 1981) was a Czech tennis player active in the 1930s and 1940s.

A native of Náchod, Caska was the 1930 national junior singles champion and twice won the Czechoslovakia international championships in doubles. In 1935, he won the singles title at the Riviera Championships and reached the fourth round at Roland Garros, beating Henner Henkel en route. He also made the fourth round of the 1936 Wimbledon Championships, where he was eliminated by Don Budge. His Davis Cup appearances took place on both sides of the war and included a win over Franjo Punčec. He became a national tennis coach in the 1960s.

== See also ==
- List of Czechoslovakia Davis Cup team representatives
