= André Martin-Legeay =

French tennis player (1906–1940)

André Clément Alexandre Martin-Legeay
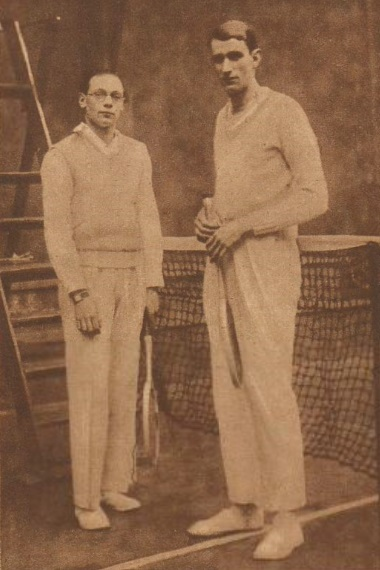
- Country (sports): France
- Born: 29 October 1906 Paris, France
- Died: 1940 Amélie-les-Bains, France
- Plays: Right-handed

Singles

Grand Slam singles results
- French Open: 4R (1935, 1936)
- Wimbledon: 4R (1936)
- US Open: 3R (1935)

Doubles

Grand Slam doubles results
- Wimbledon: 3R (1936)

Mixed doubles

Grand Slam mixed doubles results
- French Open: F (1935, 1936)
- Wimbledon: QF (1936)

André Martin-Legeay (29 October 1906 – 1940) was a French male tennis player who was active in the 1930s.

In 1933, he was a runner-up in the singles' event at the Italian Championships.

Martin-Legeay reached the fourth round of the singles' event of the French Championships in 1935 and 1936, losing to Vivian McGrath and first-seeded Fred Perry respectively. At the Wimbledon Championships in 1936 he also made it to the fourth round, in which he was defeated in straight sets by seventh-seeded Bunny Austin.

With compatriot Sylvie Henrotin he was a runner-up in the mixed doubles' competition at the French Championships in 1935 and 1936. Martin-Legeay was ranked No. 4 in France in 1935. André Martin-Legeay died in March 1940 in Amélie-les-Bains where he was convalescing.

== Grand Slam finals ==
=== Mixed doubles (2 runners-up) ===
Result	Year	Championship	Surface	Partner	Opponents	Score
Loss	1935	French Championships	Clay	(France) Sylvie Henrotin	(France) Lolette Payot (France) Marcel Bernard	6–4, 2–6, 4–6
Loss	1936	French Championships	Clay	(France) Sylvie Henrotin	(United Kingdom) Billie Yorke (France) Marcel Bernard	5–7, 8–6, 3–6
