= Italy Davis Cup team results (1922–1949) =

This is a list of all Italy Davis Cup team results in the period between 1922 and 1959. They played a total of 54 Davis Cup ties.

In this period Italy were unable to qualify for the Challenge Round, however they were inter-zonal finalist in 1928, 1930, and 1949.

== 1920s ==
=== 1922 ===
1922 ILTC Quarterfinals

Great Britain
4
Roehampton Lawn Tennis Club, London, England
19–21 June 1922
Grass

Italy
1

			1	2	3	4	5
1	(United Kingdom) (Italy)	Algernon Kingscote; Cesare Colombo	7; 5	6; 4	6; 1
2	(United Kingdom) (Italy)	Gordon Lowe; Mino Balbi Di Robecco	6; 1	6; 3	6; 1
3	(United Kingdom) (Italy)	Algernon Kingscote / Frank Riseley; Mino Balbi Di Robecco / Cesare Colombo	6; 1	6; 4	6; 0
4	(United Kingdom) (Italy)	Algernon Kingscote; Mino Balbi Di Robecco						w/o
5	(United Kingdom) (Italy)	Gordon Lowe; Cesare Colombo	6; 1	6; 2	6; 0

=== 1923 ===
1923 ILTC Europe Zone Quarterfinals

Netherlands
5
Noordwijk, Netherlands
1–3 June 1923
Clay

Italy
0

			1	2	3	4	5
1	(Netherlands) (Italy)	Christiaan van Lennep; Uberto De Morpurgo	6; 1	0; 6	6; 3	6; 2
2	(Netherlands) (Italy)	Arthur Diemer-Kool; Cesare Colombo	6; 2	6; 1	5; 7	6; 4
3	(Netherlands) (Italy)	Arthur Diemer-Kool / Christiaan van Lennep; Mino Balbi Di Robecco / Uberto De Morpurgo	6; 4	6; 4	6; 3
4	(Netherlands) (Italy)	Christiaan van Lennep; Cesare Colombo	6; 2	3; 6	6; 2	6; 3
5	(Netherlands) (Italy)	Arthur Diemer-Kool; Uberto De Morpurgo	7; 5	5; 7	3; 6	6; 4	6; 4

=== 1924 ===
1924 ILTC Europe Zone Quarterfinals

Denmark
3
Copenhagen, Denmark
14–16 June 1924

Italy
2

			1	2	3	4	5
1	(Denmark) (Italy)	Erik Tegner; Cesare Colombo	6; 0	8; 6	3; 6	6; 4
2	(Denmark) (Italy)	Axel Petersen; Uberto De Morpurgo	5; 7	2; 6	2; 6
3	(Denmark) (Italy)	Erik Tegner / Einer Ulrich; Cesare Colombo / Uberto De Morpurgo	7; 5	7; 5	4; 6	6; 0
4	(Denmark) (Italy)	Erik Tegner; Uberto De Morpurgo	3; 6	1; 6	3; 6
5	(Denmark) (Italy)	Axel Petersen; Cesare Colombo	6; 2	6; 3	6; 4

=== 1925 ===
1925 ILTC Europe Zone First round

Portugal
1
Lisbon, Portugal
8–10 May 1925
Clay

Italy
4

			1	2	3	4	5
1	(Portugal) (Italy)	José de Verda; Clemente Serventi	7; 5	1; 6	8; 6	4; 6		retired
2	(Portugal) (Italy)	Antonio Casanovas; Uberto De Morpurgo	0; 6	1; 6	2; 6
3	(Portugal) (Italy)	Antonio Casanovas / Fernando Vasconcelos; Uberto De Morpurgo / Placido Gaslini	3; 6	1; 6	6; 3	7; 9
4	(Portugal) (Italy)	Antonio Casanovas; Clemente Serventi	6; 4	4; 6	6; 2	4; 6	8; 6
5	(Portugal) (Italy)	José de Verda; Uberto De Morpurgo	2; 6	1; 6	8; 6	2; 6

1925 ILTC Europe Zone Quarterfinals

France
5
Racing Club de France, Paris, France
12–14 June 1925
Clay

Italy
0

			1	2	3	4	5
1	(France) (Italy)	René Lacoste; Uberto De Morpurgo	6; 0	6; 2	2; 6	6; 0
2	(France) (Italy)	Jean Borotra; Cesare Colombo	6; 4	6; 1	6; 1
3	(France) (Italy)	Jacques Brugnon / René Lacoste; Cesare Colombo / Uberto De Morpurgo	6; 1	6; 1	6; 1
4	(France) (Italy)	Jean Borotra; Uberto De Morpurgo	6; 1	2; 6	12; 10	6; 1
5	(France) (Italy)	Paul Féret; Cesare Colombo	8; 6	3; 6	1; 6	6; 2	6; 3

=== 1926 ===
1926 ILTC Europe Zone First round

Romania
0
Bucharest, Romania
27–29 April 1926
Clay

Italy
5

			1	2	3	4	5
1	(Romania) (Italy)	Nicolae Mișu; Uberto De Morpurgo	2; 6	1; 6	3; 6
2	(Romania) (Italy)	Alfred San Galli; Clemente Serventi	2; 6	2; 6	1; 6
3	(Romania) (Italy)	Nicolae Mișu / Alfred San Galli; Uberto De Morpurgo / Clemente Serventi	3; 6	3; 6	5; 7
4	(Romania) (Italy)	Alfred San Galli; Uberto De Morpurgo	1; 6	1; 6	2; 6
5	(Romania) (Italy)	Nicolae Mișu; Clemente Serventi	6; 2	3; 6	1; 6	1; 0		retired

1926 ILTC Europe Zone Second round

Italy
3
Rome, Italy
16–18 May 1926
Clay

Netherlands
2

			1	2	3	4	5
1	(Italy) (Netherlands)	Clemente Serventi; Hendrik Timmer	4; 6	2; 6	4; 6
2	(Italy) (Netherlands)	Uberto De Morpurgo; Christiaan van Lennep	6; 3	6; 3	6; 4
3	(Italy) (Netherlands)	Uberto De Morpurgo / Clemente Serventi; Cornelis Bryan / Hendrik Timmer	6; 3	6; 4	6; 3
4	(Italy) (Netherlands)	Uberto De Morpurgo; Hendrik Timmer	6; 4	6; 2	6; 3
5	(Italy) (Netherlands)	Clemente Serventi; Christiaan van Lennep	3; 6	6; 3	1; 6	4; 6

1926 ILTC Europe Zone Quarterfinals

Italy
2
Rome, Italy
27–29 May 1926
Clay

Great Britain
3

			1	2	3	4	5
1	(Italy) (United Kingdom)	Clemente Serventi; Patrick Wheatley	7; 5	4; 6	1; 6	3; 6
2	(Italy) (United Kingdom)	Uberto De Morpurgo; Noel Turnbull	4; 6	6; 2	4; 6	6; 4	6; 2
3	(Italy) (United Kingdom)	Uberto De Morpurgo / Clemente Serventi; Gordon Crole-Rees / Charles Kingsley	6; 3	8; 6	4; 6	3; 6	3; 6
4	(Italy) (United Kingdom)	Uberto De Morpurgo; Patrick Wheatley	6; 2	6; 3	3; 2			retired
5	(Italy) (United Kingdom)	Clemente Serventi; Noel Turnbull	6; 3	1; 6	1; 6	2; 6

=== 1927 ===
1927 ILTC Europe Zone Second round

Hungary
2
Budapest, Hungary
13–15 May 1927

Italy
3

			1	2	3	4	5
1	(Hungary) (Italy)	Béla von Kehrling; Uberto De Morpurgo	7; 5	4; 6	4; 6	7; 5	1; 6
2	(Hungary) (Italy)	Imre Takáts; Giorgio de Stefani	2; 6	1; 6	6; 4	6; 3	6; 4
3	(Hungary) (Italy)	Béla von Kehrling / Jenő Péteri; Uberto De Morpurgo / Giorgio de Stefani	3; 6	5; 7	6; 8
4	(Hungary) (Italy)	Imre Takáts; Uberto De Morpurgo	2; 6	1; 6	5; 7
5	(Hungary) (Italy)	Béla von Kehrling; Clemente Serventi	6; 2	6; 1	6; 4

1927 ILTC Europe Zone Quarterfinals

Italy
2
Rome Lawn Tennis Club, Rome, Italy
11–13 June 1927
Clay

France
3

			1	2	3	4	5
1	(Italy) (France)	Uberto De Morpurgo; René Lacoste	6; 2	0; 6	2; 6	6; 0	1; 6
2	(Italy) (France)	Giorgio de Stefani; Henri Cochet	1; 6	3; 6	3; 6
3	(Italy) (France)	Uberto De Morpurgo / Giorgio de Stefani; Jacques Brugnon / Henri Cochet	6; 4	6; 4	6; 4
4	(Italy) (France)	Uberto De Morpurgo; Henri Cochet	7; 5	5; 7	6; 1	7; 5
5	(Italy) (France)	Giorgio de Stefani; René Lacoste	3; 6	8; 6	1; 6	3; 6

=== 1928 ===
1928 ILTC Europe Zone First round

Italy
4
Genoa, Italy
4–9 May 1928
Clay

Australia
1

			1	2	3	4	5
1	(Italy) (Australia)	Uberto De Morpurgo; Jack Crawford	7; 5	6; 3	6; 2
2	(Italy) (Australia)	Giorgio de Stefani; Gerald Patterson	1; 6	3; 6	3; 6
3	(Italy) (Australia)	Placido Gaslini / Uberto De Morpurgo; Harry Hopman / Gerald Patterson	6; 3	6; 4	1; 6	1; 6	6; 2
4	(Italy) (Australia)	Uberto De Morpurgo; Gerald Patterson	1; 6	6; 4	6; 3	2; 6	6; 1
5	(Italy) (Australia)	Giorgio de Stefani; Harry Hopman	7; 5	8; 6	10; 8

1928 ILTC Europe Zone Second round

Italy
4
Rome, Italy
17–19 May 1928
Clay

Romania
0

			1	2	3	4	5
1	(Italy) (Romania)	Uberto De Morpurgo; Gheorghe Lupu	6; 2	6; 2	6; 2
2	(Italy) (Romania)	Giorgio de Stefani; Laszlo Dorner	6; 3	6; 2	6; 2
3	(Italy) (Romania)	Placido Gaslini / Uberto De Morpurgo; Laszlo Dorner / Gheorghe Lupu	6; 2	6; 4	4; 6	3; 6	6; 4
4	(Italy) (Romania)	Giorgio de Stefani; Gheorghe Lupu	3; 6	6; 4	6; 4	5; 7	9; 7
5	(Italy) (Romania)	Uberto De Morpurgo; Laszlo Dorner						not played

1928 ILTC Europe Zone Quarterfinals

Italy
4
Turin, Italy
9–11 June 1928
Clay

India
1

			1	2	3	4	5
1	(Italy) (India)	Uberto De Morpurgo; Mohammed Sleem	6; 3	6; 3	6; 1
2	(Italy) (India)	Giorgio de Stefani; E.V. Bobb	6; 4	6; 1	6; 3
3	(Italy) (India)	Placido Gaslini / Uberto De Morpurgo; E.V. Bobb / Mohammed Sleem	6; 3	6; 3	3; 6	6; 3
4	(Italy) (India)	Uberto De Morpurgo; E.V. Bobb	6; 2	6; 4	6; 4
5	(Italy) (India)	Giorgio de Stefani; Mohammed Sleem	4; 6	6; 8	6; 4	3; 6

1928 ILTC Europe Zone Semifinals

Great Britain
1
Felixstowe Lawn Tennis Club, Felixstowe, England
20–22 June 1928
Grass

Italy
4

			1	2	3	4	5
1	(United Kingdom) (Italy)	Edward Higgs; Uberto De Morpurgo	5; 7	4; 6	5; 7
2	(United Kingdom) (Italy)	Colin Gregory; Giorgio de Stefani	6; 3	3; 6	3; 6	2; 6
3	(United Kingdom) (Italy)	Gordon Crole-Rees / Cyril Eames; Placido Gaslini / Uberto De Morpurgo	4; 6	6; 3	6; 4	7; 9	5; 7
4	(United Kingdom) (Italy)	Colin Gregory; Uberto De Morpurgo	0; 6	1; 6	2; 6
5	(United Kingdom) (Italy)	Edward Higgs; Giorgio de Stefani	6; 1	3; 6	6; 3	5; 7	6; 2

1928 ILTC Europe Zone Final

Italy
3
Milan, Italy
13–15 July 1928
Clay

Czechoslovakia
2

			1	2	3	4	5
1	(Italy) (Czechoslovakia)	Uberto De Morpurgo; Pavel Macenauer	6; 3	6; 3	6; 4
2	(Italy) (Czechoslovakia)	Placido Gaslini; Jan Koželuh	1; 6	7; 9	6; 3	4; 6
3	(Italy) (Czechoslovakia)	Placido Gaslini / Uberto De Morpurgo; Jan Koželuh / Pavel Macenauer	6; 8	6; 4	4; 6	4; 6
4	(Italy) (Czechoslovakia)	Uberto De Morpurgo; Jan Koželuh	6; 1	6; 2	6; 0
5	(Italy) (Czechoslovakia)	Placido Gaslini; Pavel Macenauer	0; 6	6; 4	6; 4	6; 3

1928 ILTC
Inter-Zonal Zone
Final

United States
4
Stade Roland Garros, Paris, France
20–22 July 1928
Clay

Italy
1

			1	2	3	4	5
1	(United States) (Italy)	John Hennessey; Uberto De Morpurgo	6; 4	7; 5	6; 2
2	(United States) (Italy)	Frank Hunter; Placido Gaslini	6; 1	6; 1	6; 0
3	(United States) (Italy)	John Hennessey / George Lott; Placido Gaslini / Uberto De Morpurgo	6; 2	6; 3	6; 1
4	(United States) (Italy)	Frank Hunter; Uberto De Morpurgo	4; 6	8; 6	3; 6	6; 3	3; 6
5	(United States) (Italy)	John Hennessey; Placido Gaslini	7; 5	6; 3	6; 4

=== 1929 ===
1929 ILTC Europe Zone Second round

Ireland
0
Fitzwilliam Lawn Tennis Club, Dublin, Ireland
16–18 May 1929
Grass

Italy
5

			1	2	3	4	5
1	(Republic of Ireland) (Italy)	George Lyttleton-Rogers; Uberto De Morpurgo	6; 8	1; 6	7; 5	2; 6
2	(Republic of Ireland) (Italy)	Edward McGuire; Giorgio de Stefani	4; 6	6; 4	6; 8	6; 4	6; 8
3	(Republic of Ireland) (Italy)	Noel Galway Holmes / George Lyttleton-Rogers; Alberto del Bono / Uberto De Morpurgo	4; 6	5; 7	5; 7
4	(Republic of Ireland) (Italy)	George Lyttleton-Rogers; Giorgio de Stefani	6; 4	5; 7	2; 6	5; 7
5	(Republic of Ireland) (Italy)	Edward McGuire; Uberto De Morpurgo	0; 6	7; 5	4; 6	2; 6

1929 ILTC Europe Zone Quarterfinals

Germany
3
Hamburg, Germany
7–9 June 1929

Italy
2

			1	2	3	4	5
1	(Germany) (Italy)	Heinz Landmann; Giorgio de Stefani	3; 6	6; 4	6; 3	3; 6	6; 3
2	(Germany) (Italy)	Hans Moldenhauer; Uberto De Morpurgo	5; 7	6; 3	6; 3	3; 6	6; 2
3	(Germany) (Italy)	Hans Moldenhauer / Daniel Prenn; Alberto del Bono / Uberto De Morpurgo	6; 8	3; 6	3; 6
4	(Germany) (Italy)	Heinz Landmann; Uberto De Morpurgo	4; 6	0; 6	5; 7
5	(Germany) (Italy)	Hans Moldenhauer; Giorgio de Stefani	6; 3	3; 6	5; 7	6; 4	6; 3

== 1930s ==
=== 1930 ===
1930 ILTC Europe Zone Second round

Italy
5
Rome, Italy
9–11 May 1930
Clay

Egypt
0

			1	2	3	4	5
1	(Italy) (Egypt)	Giorgio de Stefani; Jacques Grandguillot	6; 2	6; 1	6; 2
2	(Italy) (Egypt)	Uberto De Morpurgo; Loutfalla Wahid	6; 1	6; 4	6; 2
3	(Italy) (Egypt)	Placido Gaslini / Uberto De Morpurgo; A. Riches / Nicolas Zahar	5; 7	8; 6	6; 1	3; 6	7; 5
4	(Italy) (Egypt)	Giorgio de Stefani; A. Riches	6; 0	6; 2	6; 0
5	(Italy) (Egypt)	Uberto De Morpurgo; Jacques Grandguillot	6; 4	6; 1	6; 2

1930 ILTC Europe Zone Quarterfinals

Austria
2
Vienna, Austria
6–8 June 1930

Italy
3

			1	2	3	4	5
1	(Austria) (Italy)	Hermann von Artens; Placido Gaslini	8; 6	6; 2	6; 2
2	(Austria) (Italy)	Franz-Wilhelm Matejka; Uberto De Morpurgo	2; 6	2; 6	3; 6
3	(Austria) (Italy)	Hermann von Artens / Franz-Wilhelm Matejka; Placido Gaslini / Uberto De Morpurgo	11; 9	6; 8	1; 6	6; 1	4; 6
4	(Austria) (Italy)	Franz-Wilhelm Matejka; Placido Gaslini	6; 3	6; 4	7; 5
5	(Austria) (Italy)	Hermann von Artens; Uberto De Morpurgo	2; 6	2; 6	2; 6

1930 ILTC Europe Zone Semifinals

Italy
3
Milan, Italy
14–16 June 1930
Clay

Australia
2

			1	2	3	4	5
1	(Italy) (Australia)	Giorgio de Stefani; Harry Hopman	6; 3	3; 6	7; 5	6; 2
2	(Italy) (Australia)	Uberto De Morpurgo; Jack Crawford	5; 7	6; 2	6; 4	3; 6	6; 4
3	(Italy) (Australia)	Placido Gaslini / Uberto De Morpurgo; Harry Hopman / James Willard	7; 9	7; 9	6; 4	4; 6
4	(Italy) (Australia)	Uberto De Morpurgo; Harry Hopman	8; 6	2; 6	6; 4	1; 6	6; 1
5	(Italy) (Australia)	Giorgio de Stefani; Jack Crawford	4; 6	3; 6	2; 6

1930 ILTC Europe Zone Final

Italy
3
Genoa, Italy
11–13 July 1930
Clay

Japan
2

			1	2	3	4	5
1	(Italy) (Japan)	Uberto De Morpurgo; Takeichi Harada	4; 6	3; 6	5; 7
2	(Italy) (Japan)	Giorgio de Stefani; Yoshiro Ota	6; 3	6; 4	4; 6	6; 4
3	(Italy) (Japan)	Uberto De Morpurgo / Giorgio de Stefani; Tamio Abe / Takeichi Harada	8; 6	9; 7	6; 8	2; 6	6; 1
4	(Italy) (Japan)	Giorgio de Stefani; Takeichi Harada	2; 6	5; 7	5; 7
5	(Italy) (Japan)	Uberto De Morpurgo; Yoshiro Ota	6; 0	6; 2	6; 1

1930 ILTC
Inter-Zonal Zone
Final

United States
4
Stade Roland Garros, Paris, France
18–20 July 1930
Clay

Italy
1

			1	2	3	4	5
1	(United States) (Italy)	Wilmer Allison; Giorgio de Stefani	4; 6	7; 9	6; 4	8; 6	10; 8
2	(United States) (Italy)	George Lott; Uberto De Morpurgo	3; 6	9; 7	10; 8	6; 3
3	(United States) (Italy)	Wilmer Allison / John Van Ryn; Placido Gaslini / Uberto De Morpurgo	5; 7	6; 2	6; 4	1; 6	6; 3
4	(United States) (Italy)	George Lott; Giorgio de Stefani	6; 3	6; 1	6; 3
5	(United States) (Italy)	Wilmer Allison; Uberto De Morpurgo	5; 7	2; 6	7; 5	4; 6

=== 1931 ===
1931 ILTC Europe Zone First round

Hungary
1
Budapest, Hungary
1–3 May 1931

Italy
4

			1	2	3	4	5
1	(Hungary) (Italy)	Imre Takáts; Giorgio de Stefani	3; 6	3; 6	3; 6
2	(Hungary) (Italy)	Béla von Kehrling; Uberto De Morpurgo	6; 3	6; 3	6; 4
3	(Hungary) (Italy)	Emil Gábori / Béla von Kehrling; Alberto del Bono / Uberto De Morpurgo	6; 8	6; 3	5; 7	5; 7
4	(Hungary) (Italy)	Imre Takáts; Uberto De Morpurgo	3; 6	6; 8	1; 6
5	(Hungary) (Italy)	Béla von Kehrling; Giorgio de Stefani	2; 6	6; 4	2; 6	6; 4	2; 6

1931 ILTC Europe Zone Second round

Italy
3
Turin Tennis Club, Turin, Italy
15–17 May 1931
Clay

Netherlands
0

			1	2	3	4	5
1	(Italy) (Netherlands)	Uberto De Morpurgo; Aad Knappert	6; 3	6; 1	6; 1
2	(Italy) (Netherlands)	Giorgio de Stefani; Jan van der Heide	6; 3	6; 3	6; 3
3	(Italy) (Netherlands)	Alberto del Bono / Uberto De Morpurgo; Jan van der Heide / Aad Knappert	2; 6	6; 2	6; 4	6; 1
4	(Italy) (Netherlands)	Uberto De Morpurgo; Jan van der Heide						not played
5	(Italy) (Netherlands)	Giorgio de Stefani; Aad Knappert						not played

1931 ILTC Europe Zone Quarterfinals

Czechoslovakia
3
Prague, Czechoslovakia
4–6 June 1931

Italy
0

			1	2	3	4	5
1	(Czechoslovakia) (Italy)	Ladislav Hecht; Giorgio de Stefani	6; 4	7; 5	3; 6	8; 6
2	(Czechoslovakia) (Italy)	Roderich Menzel; Uberto De Morpurgo	6; 3	6; 3	4; 6	6; 2
3	(Czechoslovakia) (Italy)	Ferenc Maršálek / Roderich Menzel; Alberto del Bono / Uberto De Morpurgo	6; 3	6; 4	6; 1
4	(Czechoslovakia) (Italy)	Roderich Menzel; Giorgio de Stefani						not played
5	(Czechoslovakia) (Italy)	Ladislav Hecht; Uberto De Morpurgo						not played

=== 1932 ===
1932 ILTC Europe Zone First round

Italy
3
Genoa, Italy
10–12 May 1932
Clay

Egypt
2

			1	2	3	4	5
1	(Italy) (Egypt)	Giorgio de Stefani; Pierre Grandguillot	9; 7	6; 1	6; 4
2	(Italy) (Egypt)	Oscar de Minerbi; Loutfalla Wahid	6; 3	8; 6	6; 8	6; 3
3	(Italy) (Egypt)	Alberto del Bono / Emanuele Sertorio; Jacques Grandguillot / Pierre Grandguillot	2; 6	3; 6	7; 5	4; 6
4	(Italy) (Egypt)	Oscar de Minerbi; Pierre Grandguillot	6; 1	6; 3	1; 6	4; 6	3; 6
5	(Italy) (Egypt)	Giorgio de Stefani; Loutfalla Wahid	6; 5	6; 4	6; 1

1932 ILTC Europe Zone Second round

Italy
4
Rome, Italy
15–17 May 1932
Clay

Spain
1

			1	2	3	4	5
1	(Italy) (Spain)	Giorgio de Stefani; Enrique Maier	6; 1	6; 4	6; 0
2	(Italy) (Spain)	Giovanni Palmieri; Antonio Juanico	6; 0	6; 1	6; 2
3	(Italy) (Spain)	Alberto del Bono / Oscar de Minerbi; Enrique Maier / José María Tejada	7; 5	2; 6	2; 6	4; 6
4	(Italy) (Spain)	Giovanni Palmieri; Enrique Maier	2; 6	6; 0	6; 2	5; 2		retired
5	(Italy) (Spain)	Giorgio de Stefani; Antonio Juanico	6; 0	6; 1	6; 2

1932 ILTC Europe Zone Quarterfinals

Switzerland
2
Montreux, Switzerland
11–14 June 1932

Italy
3

			1	2	3	4	5
1	(Switzerland) (Italy)	Hector Fisher; Giovanni Palmieri	6; 8	6; 4	1; 6	6; 1	6; 3
2	(Switzerland) (Italy)	Charles Aeschlimann; Giorgio de Stefani	4; 6	5; 7	6; 8
3	(Switzerland) (Italy)	Charles Aeschlimann / Hector Fisher; Giovanni Palmieri / Emanuele Sertorio	6; 3	4; 6	4; 6	4; 6
4	(Switzerland) (Italy)	Charles Aeschlimann; Giovanni Palmieri	3; 6	1; 6	5; 7
5	(Switzerland) (Italy)	Hector Fisher; Giorgio de Stefani	3; 6	0; 6	9; 7	8; 6	8; 6

1932 ILTC Europe Zone Semifinals

Italy
3
Milan, Italy
8–10 July 1932
Clay

Japan
2

			1	2	3	4	5
1	(Italy) (Japan)	Giorgio de Stefani; Jiro Sato	6; 3	6; 4	6; 4
2	(Italy) (Japan)	Giovanni Palmieri; Takeo Kuwabara	0; 6	2; 6	6; 1	3; 6
3	(Italy) (Japan)	Giovanni Palmieri / Emanuele Sertorio; Ryuki Miki / Jiro Sato	4; 6	4; 6	3; 6
4	(Italy) (Japan)	Giovanni Palmieri; Jiro Sato	4; 6	4; 6	6; 1	6; 1	6; 2
5	(Italy) (Japan)	Giorgio de Stefani; Takeo Kuwabara	6; 2	6; 2	6; 4

1932 ILTC Europe Zone
Final

Italy
0
Milan, Italy
15–17 July 1932
Clay

Germany
5

			1	2	3	4	5
1	(Italy) (Germany)	Giovanni Palmieri; Gottfried von Cramm	3; 6	4; 6	0; 6
2	(Italy) (Germany)	Giorgio de Stefani; Daniel Prenn	1; 6	4; 6	6; 1	2; 6
3	(Italy) (Germany)	Alberto del Bono / Giorgio de Stefani; Gottfried von Cramm / Daniel Prenn	3; 6	3; 6	2; 6
4	(Italy) (Germany)	Giovanni Palmieri; Gustav Jaenecke	3; 6	6; 0	1; 6	6; 2	1; 6
5	(Italy) (Germany)	Alberto del Bono; Gottfried von Cramm	6; 8	3; 6	6; 3	1; 6

=== 1933 ===
1933 ILTC Europe Zone First round

Italy
4
Florence, Italy
4–6 May 1933
Clay

Yugoslavia
1

			1	2	3	4	5
1	(Italy) (Kingdom of Yugoslavia)	Uberto De Morpurgo; Franjo Punčec	9; 7	6; 3	6; 4
2	(Italy) (Kingdom of Yugoslavia)	Giorgio de Stefani; Franjo Kukuljević	6; 4	6; 0	3; 6	6; 2
3	(Italy) (Kingdom of Yugoslavia)	Uberto De Morpurgo / Augusto Rado; Franjo Kukuljević / Josip Palada	14; 12	3; 6	6; 1	4; 6	3; 6
4	(Italy) (Kingdom of Yugoslavia)	Uberto De Morpurgo; Franjo Kukuljević	7; 5	6; 3	6; 4
5	(Italy) (Kingdom of Yugoslavia)	Giorgio de Stefani; Josip Palada	6; 1	6; 2	6; 2

1933 ILTC Europe Zone Second round

Italy
4
Genoa, Italy
19–21 May 1933
Clay

Austria
1

			1	2	3	4	5
1	(Italy) (Austria)	Giorgio de Stefani; Hermann von Artens	7; 5	6; 2	6; 0
2	(Italy) (Austria)	Uberto De Morpurgo; Franz-Wilhelm Matejka	3; 6	6; 3	6; 3	3; 6	3; 6
3	(Italy) (Austria)	Augusto Rado / Valentino Taroni; Hermann von Artens / Franz-Wilhelm Matejka	6; 3	4; 6	4; 6	6; 2	7; 5
4	(Italy) (Austria)	Giorgio de Stefani; Franz-Wilhelm Matejka	6; 3	6; 3	4; 6	6; 2
5	(Italy) (Austria)	Uberto De Morpurgo; Hermann von Artens	4; 6	7; 5	6; 3	6; 3

1933 ILTC Europe Zone
Quarterfinals

Great Britain
4
Devonshire Park Lawn Tennis Club, Eastbourne, England
8–10 June 1933
Grass

Italy
1

			1	2	3	4	5
1	(United Kingdom) (Italy)	Fred Perry; Uberto De Morpurgo	6; 4	7; 5	6; 4
2	(United Kingdom) (Italy)	Bunny Austin; Giorgio de Stefani	6; 2	7; 5	7; 5
3	(United Kingdom) (Italy)	Pat Hughes / Fred Perry; Augusto Rado / Valentino Taroni	6; 1	6; 4	9; 7
4	(United Kingdom) (Italy)	Fred Perry; Giorgio de Stefani	7; 5	4; 6	4; 6	4; 6
5	(United Kingdom) (Italy)	Bunny Austin; Uberto De Morpurgo	6; 4	6; 3	6; 2

1934 ILTC Europe Zone Qualifying 2nd round

Poland
2
Warsaw, Poland
4–6 August 1933

Italy
3

			1	2	3	4	5
1	(Poland) (Italy)	Józef Hebda; Emanuele Sertorio	7; 5	6; 0	6; 0
2	(Poland) (Italy)	Ignacy Tłoczyński; Giorgio de Stefani	3; 6	6; 2	2; 6	5; 7
3	(Poland) (Italy)	Józef Hebda / Ernest Wittmann; Emanuele Sertorio / Valentino Taroni	2; 6	2; 6	6; 3	6; 2	4; 6
4	(Poland) (Italy)	Józef Hebda; Giorgio de Stefani	2; 6	3; 6	6; 0	6; 4	2; 6
5	(Poland) (Italy)	Ignacy Tłoczyński; Emanuele Sertorio	6; 2	4; 6	6; 3	6; 4

1934 ILTC Europe Zone Qualifying round

Netherlands
2
Scheveningen, Netherlands
18–20 August 1933
Clay

Italy
3

			1	2	3	4	5
1	(Netherlands) (Italy)	Hendrik Timmer; Giorgio de Stefani	9; 11	7; 5	6; 4	2; 6	2; 6
2	(Netherlands) (Italy)	Willem Karsten; Augusto Rado	1; 6	3; 6	1; 6
3	(Netherlands) (Italy)	Ody Koopman / Gerard Scheurleer; Ferruccio Quintavalle / Valentino Taroni	6; 4	6; 1	2; 6	6; 3
4	(Netherlands) (Italy)	Hendrik Timmer; Augusto Rado	5; 7	6; 1	6; 1	6; 1
5	(Netherlands) (Italy)	Willem Karsten; Giorgio de Stefani	3; 6	2; 6	1; 6

=== 1934 ===
1934 ILTC Europe Zone Quarterfinals

Italy
5
Rome, Italy
8–10 June 1934
Clay

Switzerland
0

			1	2	3	4	5
1	(Italy) (Switzerland)	Giorgio de Stefani; Max Ellmer	6; 3	6; 3	6; 3
2	(Italy) (Switzerland)	Augusto Rado; Hector Fisher	6; 1	6; 0	11; 9
3	(Italy) (Switzerland)	Ferruccio Quintavalle / Valentino Taroni; Charles Aeschlimann / Werner Steiner	0; 6	0; 6	6; 3	6; 3	6; 4
4	(Italy) (Switzerland)	Giorgio de Stefani; Hector Fisher	6; 3	6; 2	6; 3
5	(Italy) (Switzerland)	Augusto Rado; Max Ellmer	6; 4	6; 2	6; 4

1934 ILTC Europe Zone Semifinals

Italy
2
Milan, Italy
15–17 June 1934
Clay

Czechoslovakia
3

			1	2	3	4	5
1	(Italy) (Czechoslovakia)	Giorgio de Stefani; Ladislav Hecht	6; 3	7; 5	1; 6	6; 2
2	(Italy) (Czechoslovakia)	Augusto Rado; Roderich Menzel	1; 6	2; 6	8; 10
3	(Italy) (Czechoslovakia)	Ferruccio Quintavalle / Augusto Rado; Ferenc Maršálek / Roderich Menzel	8; 6	3; 6	0; 6	4; 6
4	(Italy) (Czechoslovakia)	Giorgio de Stefani; Roderich Menzel	0; 6	7; 5	6; 2	5; 7	6; 3
5	(Italy) (Czechoslovakia)	Augusto Rado; Ladislav Hecht	2; 6	6; 8	2; 6

=== 1935 ===
1935 ILTC Europe Zone Quarterfinals

Germany
4
Berlin, Germany
8–10 June 1935

Italy
1

			1	2	3	4	5
1	(Germany) (Italy)	Henner Henkel; Giorgio de Stefani	1; 6	3; 6	4; 6
2	(Germany) (Italy)	Gottfried von Cramm; Stefano Mangold	6; 0	6; 4	6; 4
3	(Germany) (Italy)	Gottfried von Cramm / Hans Denker; Ferruccio Quintavalle / Valentino Taroni	4; 6	6; 3	2; 6	6; 3	6; 1
4	(Germany) (Italy)	Henner Henkel; Stefano Mangold	6; 1	6; 8	6; 4	6; 4
5	(Germany) (Italy)	Gottfried von Cramm; Giorgio de Stefani	6; 3	6; 4	5; 7	6; 1

=== 1937 ===
1937 ILTC Europe Zone Second round

Italy
5
Bologna, Italy
8–10 May 1937
Clay

Monaco
0

			1	2	3	4	5
1	(Italy) (Monaco)	Vanni Canepele; Gaston Médécin	6; 0	6; 1	6; 0
2	(Italy) (Monaco)	Giorgio de Stefani; Vladimir Landau	6; 2	6; 0	6; 3
3	(Italy) (Monaco)	Ferruccio Quintavalle / Valentino Taroni; Vladimir Landau / Gaston Médécin	6; 1	6; 3	6; 3
4	(Italy) (Monaco)	Vanni Canepele; Vladimir Landau	6; 0	6; 4	6; 1
5	(Italy) (Monaco)	Giorgio de Stefani; Gaston Médécin	6; 1	7; 5	7; 5

1937 ILTC Europe Zone Quarterfinals

Italy
1
Milan, Italy
4–6 June 1937
Clay

Germany
4

			1	2	3	4	5
1	(Italy) (Germany)	Vanni Canepele; Gottfried von Cramm	1; 6	4; 6	6; 1	4; 6
2	(Italy) (Germany)	Giorgio de Stefani; Henner Henkel	6; 2	6; 3	5; 7	6; 2
3	(Italy) (Germany)	Ferruccio Quintavalle / Valentino Taroni; Gottfried von Cramm / Henner Henkel	3; 6	1; 6	1; 6
4	(Italy) (Germany)	Vanni Canepele; Henner Henkel	6; 3	3; 6	1; 6	4; 6
5	(Italy) (Germany)	Giorgio de Stefani; Gottfried von Cramm	0; 6	1; 6	4; 6

=== 1938 ===
1938 ILTC Europe Zone First round

Ireland
1
Fitzwilliam Lawn Tennis Club, Dublin, Ireland
5–7 May 1938
Grass

Italy
4

			1	2	3	4	5
1	(Republic of Ireland) (Italy)	George Lyttleton-Rogers; Giorgio de Stefani	7; 5	2; 6	6; 3	6; 2
2	(Republic of Ireland) (Italy)	George McVeagh; Vanni Canepele	0; 6	2; 6	0; 6
3	(Republic of Ireland) (Italy)	George Lyttleton-Rogers / George McVeagh; Ferruccio Quintavalle / Valentino Taroni	3; 6	6; 4	1; 6	2; 6
4	(Republic of Ireland) (Italy)	Hector Ryan; Giorgio de Stefani	2; 6	2; 6	2; 6
5	(Republic of Ireland) (Italy)	George Lyttleton-Rogers; Vanni Canepele	7; 5	3; 6	6; 1	3; 6	1; 6

1938 ILTC Europe Zone Second round

Italy
3
Milan, Italy
19–21 May 1938
Clay

Poland
2

			1	2	3	4	5
1	(Italy) (Poland)	Vanni Canepele; Józef Hebda	6; 1	7; 9	6; 2	7; 9	6; 2
2	(Italy) (Poland)	Giorgio de Stefani; Ignacy Tłoczyński	8; 6	6; 4	2; 6	2; 6		retired
3	(Italy) (Poland)	Ferruccio Quintavalle / Valentino Taroni; Czesław Spychała / Ignacy Tłoczyński	11; 9	2; 6	6; 4	3; 6	7; 5
4	(Italy) (Poland)	Valentino Taroni; Józef Hebda	3; 6	6; 3	1; 6	4; 6
5	(Italy) (Poland)	Vanni Canepele; Ignacy Tłoczyński	6; 2	6; 1	2; 6	6; 2

1938 ILTC Europe Zone Quarterfinals

France
4
Stade Roland Garros, Paris, France
27–29 May 1938
Clay

Italy
1

			1	2	3	4	5
1	(France) (Italy)	Yvon Petra; Valentino Taroni	6; 0	6; 2	6; 3
2	(France) (Italy)	Bernard Destremau; Vanni Canepele	3; 6	6; 0	6; 2	7; 5
3	(France) (Italy)	Henri Bolelli / Pierre Pellizza; Ferruccio Quintavalle / Valentino Taroni	9; 7	6; 3	6; 4
4	(France) (Italy)	Bernard Destremau; Valentino Taroni	6; 8	7; 5	4; 6	2; 6
5	(France) (Italy)	Pierre Pellizza; Renato Bossi	4; 6	6; 4	5; 7	6; 3	7; 5

=== 1939 ===
1939 ILTC Europe Zone Second round

Italy
3
Naples, Italy
12–14 May 1939
Clay

Monaco
0

			1	2	3	4	5
1	(Italy) (Monaco)	Vanni Canepele; Aleco Noghès	6; 0	6; 3	6; 1
2	(Italy) (Monaco)	Giorgio de Stefani; Gaston Médécin	6; 1	6; 2	6; 2
3	(Italy) (Monaco)	Giovanni Cucelli / Gino Vido; Vladimir Landau / Aleco Noghès	6; 3	6; 1	6; 0
4	(Italy) (Monaco)	Giorgio de Stefani; Aleco Noghès						not played
5	(Italy) (Monaco)	Vanni Canepele; Gaston Médécin						not played

1939 ILTC Europe Zone Quarterfinals

Italy
2
Milan, Italy
26–28 May 1939
Clay

Yugoslavia
3

			1	2	3	4	5
1	(Italy) (Kingdom of Yugoslavia)	Vanni Canepele; Dragutin Mitić	6; 3	6; 3	7; 5
2	(Italy) (Kingdom of Yugoslavia)	Giorgio de Stefani; Franjo Punčec	4; 6	1; 6	5; 7
3	(Italy) (Kingdom of Yugoslavia)	Giovanni Cucelli / Valentino Taroni; Dragutin Mitić / Franjo Punčec	2; 6	2; 6	0; 6
4	(Italy) (Kingdom of Yugoslavia)	Giorgio de Stefani; Dragutin Mitić	6; 1	6; 4	4; 6	6; 3
5	(Italy) (Kingdom of Yugoslavia)	Vanni Canepele; Franjo Punčec	11; 13	1; 6	8; 6	3; 6

== 1940s ==
=== 1948 ===
1948 Davis Cup Europe Zone Second round

Yugoslavia
2
Zagreb, Yugoslavia
14–16 May 1948

Italy
3

			1	2	3	4	5
1	(Socialist Federal Republic of Yugoslavia) (Italy)	Dragutin Mitić; Giovanni Cucelli	5; 7	8; 6	6; 1	6; 2
2	(Socialist Federal Republic of Yugoslavia) (Italy)	Josip Palada; Marcello del Bello	2; 6	3; 6	8; 6	7; 9
3	(Socialist Federal Republic of Yugoslavia) (Italy)	Dragutin Mitić / Josip Palada; Marcello del Bello / Giovanni Cucelli	0; 6	3; 6	6; 1	5; 7
4	(Socialist Federal Republic of Yugoslavia) (Italy)	Dragutin Mitić; Marcello del Bello	5; 7	4; 6	6; 8
5	(Socialist Federal Republic of Yugoslavia) (Italy)	Josip Palada; Giovanni Cucelli	5; 7	6; 4	6; 1	6; 4

1948 Davis Cup Europe Zone Quarterfinals

Italy
5
Turin, Italy
11–13 June 1948
Clay

Denmark
0

			1	2	3	4	5
1	(Italy) (Denmark)	Giovanni Cucelli; Kurt Nielsen	6; 4	4; 6	6; 1	6; 1
2	(Italy) (Denmark)	Marcello del Bello; Torben Ulrich	6; 3	6; 3	6; 3
3	(Italy) (Denmark)	Marcello del Bello / Giovanni Cucelli; Kurt Nielsen / Torben Ulrich	6; 2	6; 3	8; 6
4	(Italy) (Denmark)	Giovanni Cucelli; Torben Ulrich	6; 3	6; 3	6; 1
5	(Italy) (Denmark)	Marcello del Bello; Kurt Nielsen	6; 2	7; 5	6; 3

1948 Davis Cup Europe Zone Semifinals

Italy
2
Milan, Italy
9–11 July 1948
Clay

Czechoslovakia
3

			1	2	3	4	5
1	(Italy) (Czechoslovakia)	Giovanni Cucelli; Jaroslav Drobný	3; 6	6; 3	2; 6	3; 6
2	(Italy) (Czechoslovakia)	Marcello del Bello; Vladimír Černík	2; 6	4; 6	9; 7	3; 6
3	(Italy) (Czechoslovakia)	Marcello del Bello / Giovanni Cucelli; Vladimír Černík / Jaroslav Drobný	6; 1	8; 6	6; 2
4	(Italy) (Czechoslovakia)	Marcello del Bello; Jaroslav Drobný	9; 11	3; 6	2; 6
5	(Italy) (Czechoslovakia)	Giovanni Cucelli; Vladimír Černík	6; 2	2; 6	6; 3	6; 3

=== 1949 ===
1949 Davis Cup Europe Zone Second round

Italy
4
Milan, Italy
13–15 May
Clay

South Africa
1

			1	2	3	4	5
1	(Italy) (South Africa)	Giovanni Cucelli; Eustace Fannin	7; 5	7; 5	6; 3
2	(Italy) (South Africa)	Vanni Canepele; Eric Sturgess	3; 6	1; 6	4; 6
3	(Italy) (South Africa)	Marcello del Bello / Giovanni Cucelli; Eustace Fannin / Eric Sturgess	6; 3	7; 9	10; 8	2; 6	8; 6
4	(Italy) (South Africa)	Vanni Canepele; Eustace Fannin	6; 4	7; 5	6; 4
5	(Italy) (South Africa)	Giovanni Cucelli; Eric Sturgess	6; 1	2; 6	6; 0	6; 4

1949 Davis Cup Europe Zone Quarterfinals

Italy
4
Turin, Italy
10–12 June
Clay

Chile
1

			1	2	3	4	5
1	(Italy) (Chile)	Giovanni Cucelli; Marcelo Taverne	6; 1	6; 0	6; 4
2	(Italy) (Chile)	Marcello del Bello; Ricardo Balbiers	3; 6	4; 6	6; 4	3; 6
3	(Italy) (Chile)	Marcello del Bello / Giovanni Cucelli; Ricardo Balbiers / Marcelo Taverne	6; 3	6; 3	4; 6	6; 4
4	(Italy) (Chile)	Giovanni Cucelli; Ricardo Balbiers	6; 4	8; 6	7; 5
5	(Italy) (Chile)	Marcello del Bello; Marcelo Taverne	8; 10	6; 0	6; 1			retired

1949 Davis Cup Europe Zone Semifinals

Italy
4
Foro Italico, Rome, Italy
8–10 July
Clay

Yugoslavia
1

			1	2	3	4	5
1	(Italy) (Socialist Federal Republic of Yugoslavia)	Giovanni Cucelli; Dragutin Mitić	5; 7	6; 2	6; 1	7; 5
2	(Italy) (Socialist Federal Republic of Yugoslavia)	Vanni Canepele; Josip Palada	6; 4	6; 4	6; 1
3	(Italy) (Socialist Federal Republic of Yugoslavia)	Marcello del Bello / Giovanni Cucelli; Dragutin Mitić / Josip Palada	6; 4	6; 0	7; 5
4	(Italy) (Socialist Federal Republic of Yugoslavia)	Marcello del Bello; Josip Palada	6; 3	6; 1	7; 5
5	(Italy) (Socialist Federal Republic of Yugoslavia)	Vanni Canepele; Dragutin Mitić	1; 6	4; 6	3; 6

1949 Davis Cup Europe Zone Final

France
2
Stade Roland Garros, Paris, France
23–25 July
Clay

Italy
3

			1	2	3	4	5
1	(France) (Italy)	Robert Abdesselam; Giovanni Cucelli	6; 1	8; 6	8; 10	4; 6	2; 6
2	(France) (Italy)	Marcel Bernard; Marcello del Bello	6; 4	6; 3	4; 6	2; 6	10; 8
3	(France) (Italy)	Marcel Bernard / Henri Bolleli; Marcello del Bello / Giovanni Cucelli	6; 3	1; 6	6; 4	0; 6	2; 6
4	(France) (Italy)	Robert Abdesselam; Marcello del Bello	6; 3	6; 4	6; 2
5	(France) (Italy)	Marcel Bernard; Giovanni Cucelli	6; 8	6; 3	6; 4	0; 6	1; 6

1949 Davis Cup Inter-Zonal Final

Australia
5
Westchester Country Club, Rye, NY, United States
12–15 August
Grass

Italy
0

			1	2	3	4	5
1	(Australia) (Italy)	Bill Sidwell; Giovanni Cucelli	6; 2	6; 4	2; 6	6; 2
2	(Australia) (Italy)	Frank Sedgman; Marcello del Bello	6; 0	6; 4	6; 4
3	(Australia) (Italy)	John Bromwich / Frank Sedgman; Marcello del Bello / Giovanni Cucelli	2; 6	6; 2	6; 2	6; 1
4	(Australia) (Italy)	Bill Sidwell; Marcello del Bello	6; 1	6; 1	6; 0
5	(Australia) (Italy)	Frank Sedgman; Giovanni Cucelli	1; 6	6; 1	6; 2	6; 2

== See also ==
- Italy Davis Cup team results (1950–1969)
- Italy Davis Cup team results (1970–1999)
- Italy Davis Cup team results (2000–present)
