= List of Italy Davis Cup team representatives =

This is a list of tennis players who have represented the Italy Davis Cup team in an official Davis Cup match. Italy have taken part in the competition since 1922.

== Players ==
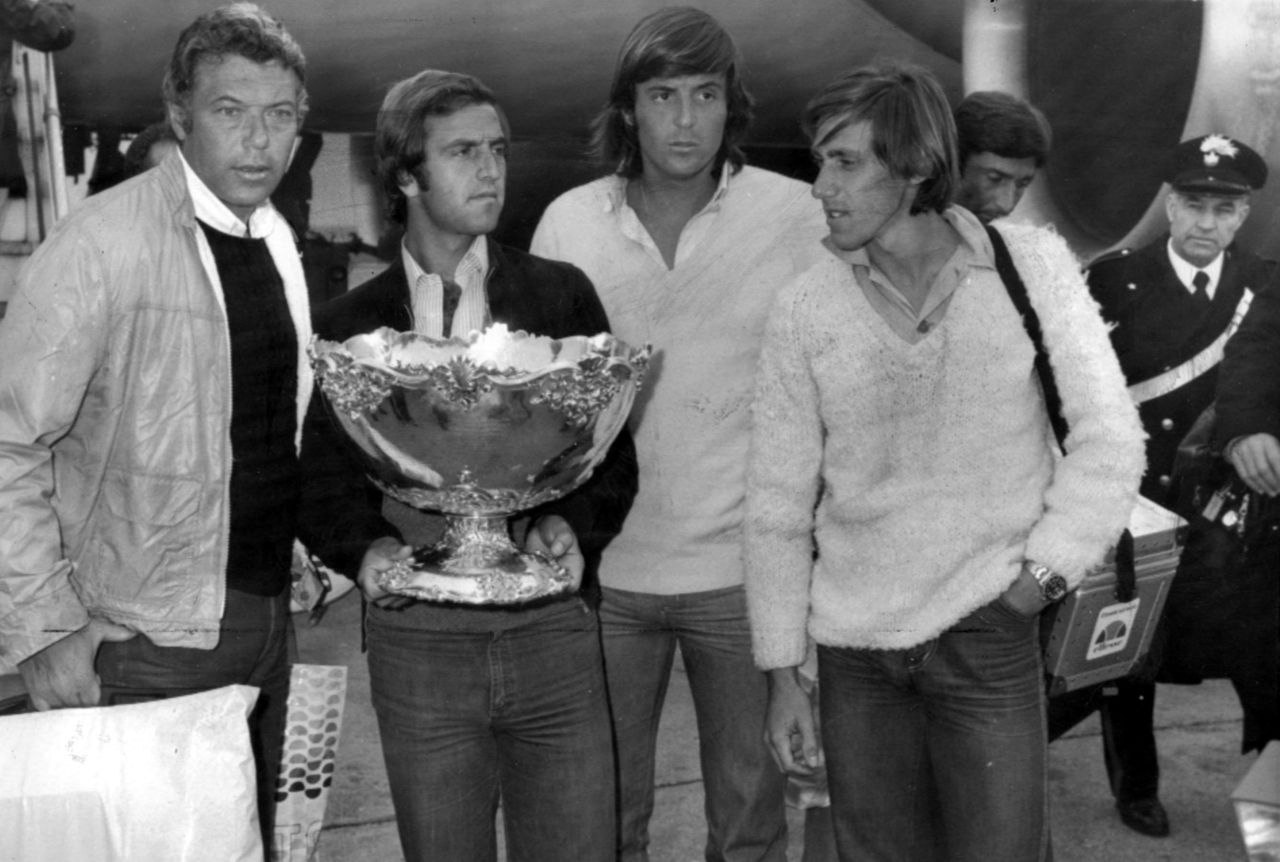
The Italian men's national tennis team at their landing in Rome shows the Davis Cup won in Santiago, Chile, few days before. From left to right: Nicola Pietrangeli (team captain), Paolo Bertolucci, Adriano Panatta, Corrado Barazzutti and, partly hidden, Tonino Zugarelli. Italy beat Chile 4-1 in the 1976 Davis Cup final for their first ever (and, to 2022, the only) Davis Cup.

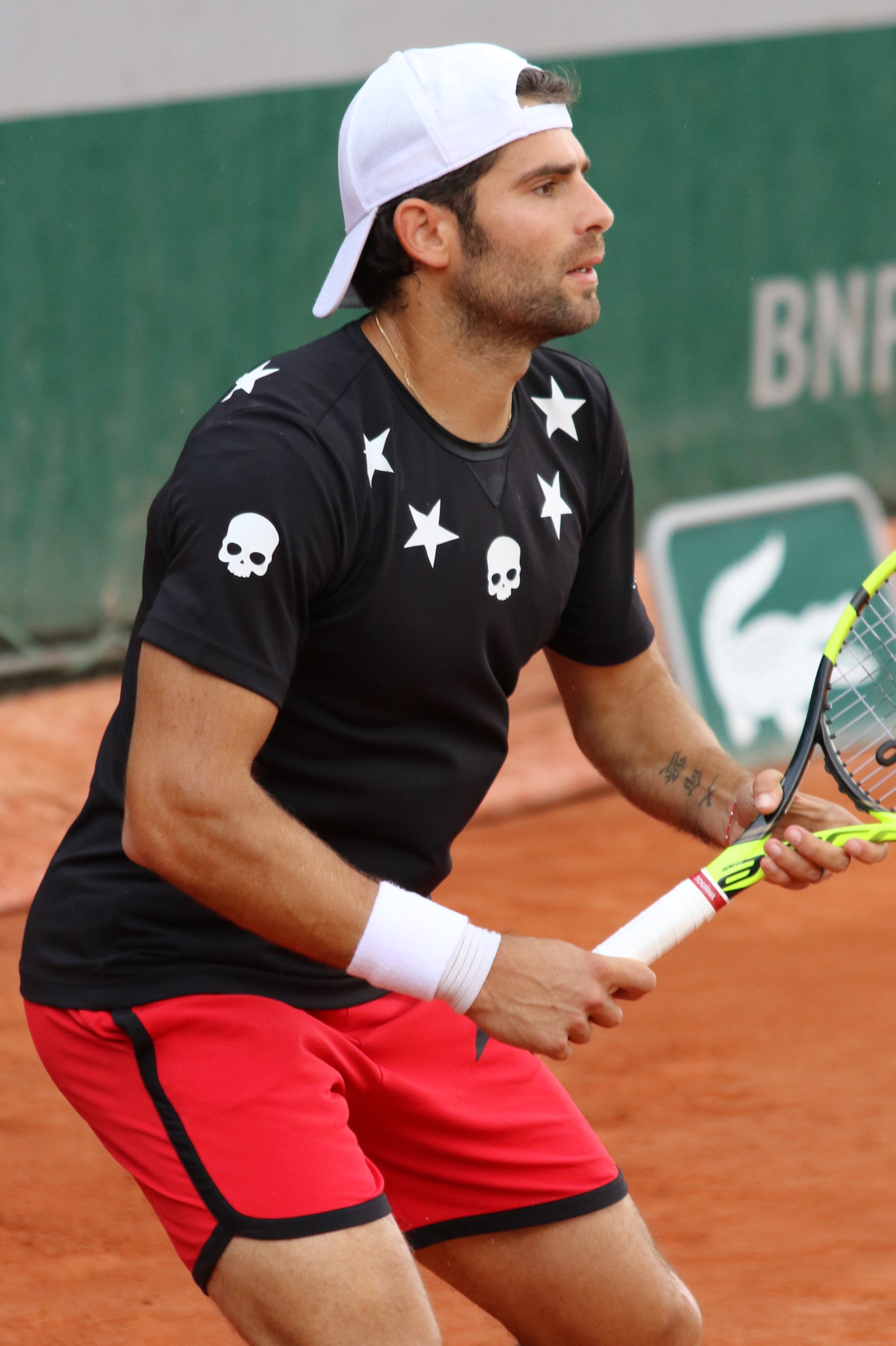
Simone Bolelli, currently the active player with the most ties played

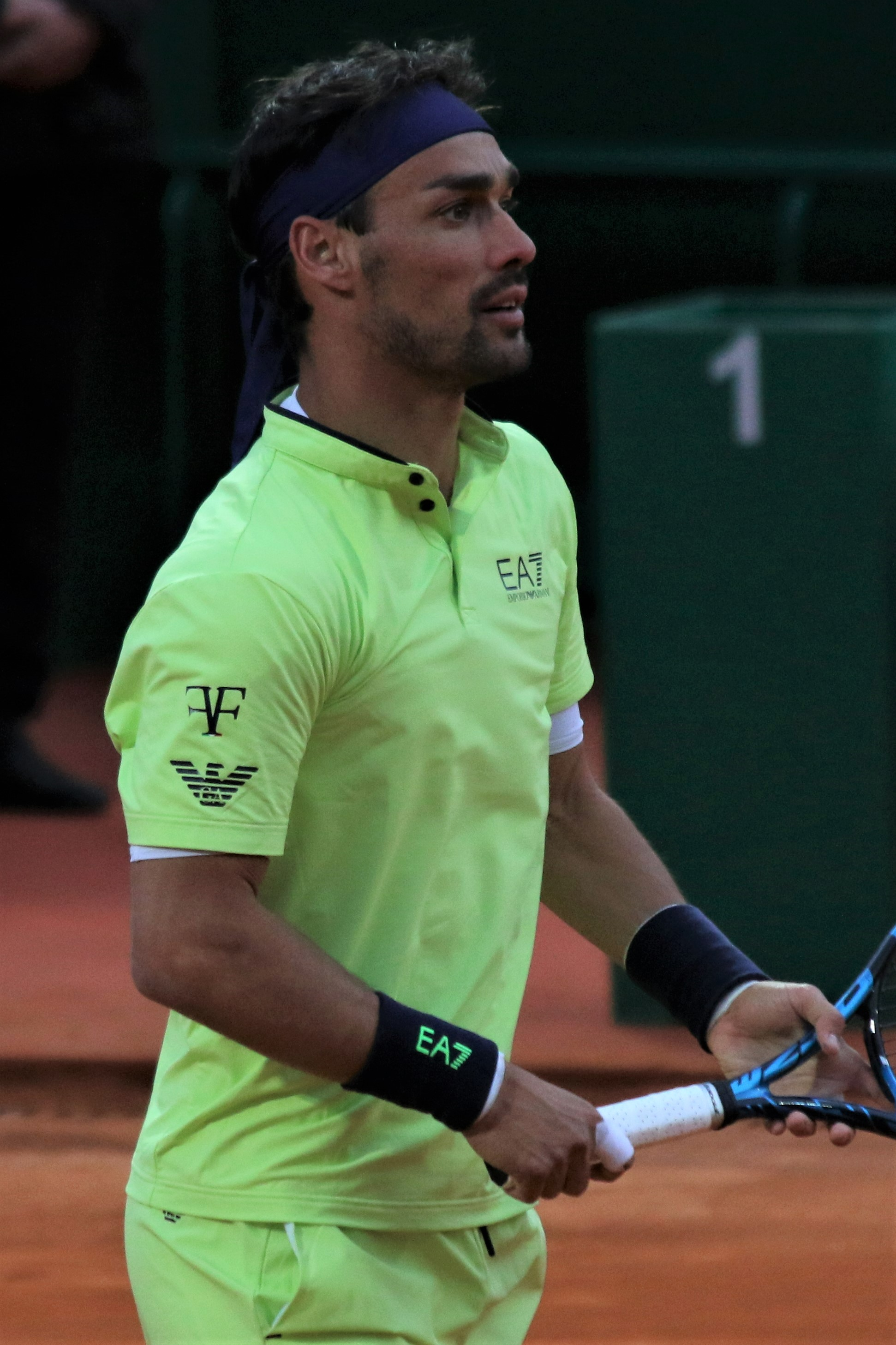
Fabio Fognini, currently the player with the most rubbers won

As of 21 November 2025

Still active

Player	Debut	Ties	Win-loss			Win%
Player	Debut	Ties	Singles	Doubles	Total	Win%
Matteo Arnaldi	2023	6	4–1	0–1	4–2	66.67%
Mino Balbi Di Robecco	1922	2	0–1	0–2	0–3	0%
Corrado Barazzutti	1972	32	39–21	2–0	41–21	66.13%
Matteo Berrettini	2019	16	12–2	2–2	14–4	77.78%
Massimo Bertolini	2002	6	0–0	4–2	4–2	66.67%
Paolo Bertolucci	1972	32	8–2	22–8	30–10	75%
Simone Bolelli	2007	34	7–9	17–13	24–22	52.17%
Renato Bossi	1938	1	0–1	0–0	0–1	0%
Daniele Bracciali	2005	13	2–4	6–5	8–9	47.06%
Cristian Brandi	1994	3	0–0	2–1	2–1	66.67%
Omar Camporese	1989	11	12–9	6–3	18–12	60%
Francesco Cancellotti	1983	6	5–6	0–0	5–6	45.45%
Paolo Canè	1986	11	9–8	2–7	11–15	42.31%
Vanni Canepele	1937	9	10–6	0–0	10–6	62.5%
Cristiano Caratti	1992	1	1–1	0–0	1–1	50%
Eugenio Castigliano	1968	4	5–2	1–0	6–2	75%
Marco Cecchinato	2016	1	1–0	0–0	1–0	100%
Flavio Cobolli	2024	5	4–1	0–0	4–1	80%
Flavio Cipolla	2009	1	1–0	0–1	1–1	50%
Cesare Colombo	1922	4	0–8	0–3	0–11	0%
Simone Colombo	1987	3	0–2	1–2	1–4	20%
Vittorio Crotta	1939	6	0–0	3–3	3–3	50%
Giovanni Cucelli	1932	27	17–11	21–6	38–17	69.09%
Oscar de Minerbi	1932	2	1–1	0–1	1–2	33.33%
Umberto De Morpurgo	1923	28	39–14	16–10	55–24	69.62%
Giorgio de Stefani	1927	34	41–21	3–1	44–22	66.67%
Marcello Del Bello	1948	25	8–10	20–5	28–15	65.12%
Rolando Del Bello	1950	13	14–10	1–0	15–10	60%
Alberto Del Bono	1929	8	0–1	4–4	4–5	44.44%
Massimo Di Domenico	1970	3	1–2	2–1	3–3	50%
Gaetano Di Maso	1966	2	0–0	0–2	0–2	0%
Ezio Di Matteo	1968	2	1–0	1–0	2–0	100%
Alessio di Mauro	2004	1	1–0	0–0	1–0	100%
Fabio Fognini	2008	30	23–9	12–11	35–20	63.64%
Renzo Furlan	1993	11	10–9	0–0	10–9	52.63%
Giorgio Galimberti	2001	11	2–2	7–4	9–6	60%
Stefano Galvani	2002	2	1–2	0–0	1–2	33.33%
Fausto Gardini	1952	21	29–9	0–0	29–9	76.32%
Placido Gaslini	1925	11	1–5	7–4	8–9	47.06%
Andrea Gaudenzi	1994	14	14–10	5–4	19–14	57.58%
Alessandro Giannessi	2017	1	1–0	0–0	1–0	100%
Paolo Lorenzi	2010	7	5–4	0–1	5–5	50%
Federico Luzzi	2001	3	2–2	0–0	2–2	50%
Antonio Maggi	1957	2	1–1	0–0	1–1	50%
Giordano Majoli	1964	12	7–1	4–7	11–8	57.89%
Stefano Mangold	1935	1	0–2	0–0	0–2	0%
Marzio Martelli	1997	1	0–1	0–0	0–1	0%
Pietro Marzano	1969	5	0–0	1–4	1–4	20%
Giuseppe Merlo	1951	22	25–10	0–0	25–10	71.43%
Martin Mulligan	1968	4	6–2	3–0	9–2	81.82%
Lorenzo Musetti	2021	10	2–5	1–2	3–7	30%
Massimiliano Narducci	1989	1	0–2	0–0	0–2	0%
Diego Nargiso	1988	25	5–2	13–12	18–14	56.25%
Mosé Navarra	2001	3	2–0	1–2	3–2	60%
Gianni Ocleppo	1980	8	4–3	2–3	6–6	50%
Giovanni Palmieri	1932	4	4–4	1–1	5–5	50%
Adriano Panatta	1970	38	37–26	27–10	64–36	64%
Claudio Panatta	1983	8	5–8	2–4	7–12	36.84%
Stefano Pescosolido	1992	8	2–3	3–2	5–5	50%
Nicola Pietrangeli	1954	66	78–32	42–12	120–44	73.17%
Claudio Pistolesi	1989	3	2–2	0–0	2–2	50%
Gianluca Pozzi	1998	3	2–2	0–0	2–2	50%
Ferruccio Quintavalle	1934	9	0–0	4–5	4–5	44.44%
Augusto Rado	1933	6	3–3	1–3	4–6	40%
Davide Sanguinetti	1998	12	11–10	0–1	11–11	50%
Vincenzo Santopadre	2000	2	0–2	1–0	1–2	33.33%
Andreas Seppi	2004	27	20–19	4–2	24–21	53.33%
Emanuele Sertorio	1932	4	0–2	2–2	2–4	33.33%
Clemente Serventi	1925	5	3–6	2–1	5–7	41.67%
Jannik Sinner	2021	12	12–1	3–3	15–4	78.95%
Orlando Sirola	1953	46	22–25	35–8	57–33	63.33%
Lorenzo Sonego	2021	10	6–3	3–0	9–3	75%
Potito Starace	2004	16	15–1	6–5	21–6	77.78%
Sergio Tacchini	1959	10	5–8	1–1	6–9	40%
Valentino Taroni	1933	12	1–2	6–6	7–8	46.67%
Laurence Tieleman	1999	1	0–0	0–1	0–1	0%
Stefano Travaglia	2021	1	1–0	0–0	1–0	100%
Andrea Vavassori	2024	3	0–0	1–2	1–2	33.33%
Gino Vido	1939	1	0–0	1–0	1–0	100%
Filippo Volandri	2001	10	10–7	0–0	10–7	58.82%
Tonino Zugarelli	1971	12	6–9	1–0	7–9	43.75%

== See also ==
- Italy Davis Cup team
- Tennis in Italy
