= 1925 International Lawn Tennis Challenge Europe Zone =

International tennis competition

The Europe Zone was one of the two regional zones of the 1925 International Lawn Tennis Challenge.

16 teams entered the Europe Zone, with the winner going on to compete in the Inter-Zonal Final against the winner of the America Zone. France defeated the Netherlands in the final, and went on to face Australia in the Inter-Zonal Final.

== Draw ==
First round 8–19 May
Budapest, Hungary (clay)
France	4
Hungary	1
Lisbon, Portugal (clay)
Portugal	1
Italy	4
London, England (clay)
Romania	1
Denmark	4
Warsaw, Poland (clay)
Poland	0
Great Britain	5
Vienna, Austria
Austria	4
Ireland	1
Brussels, Belgium
Belgium	2
India	3
Bern, Switzerland
Sweden	3
Switzerland	2
Noordwijk, Netherlands (clay)
Netherlands	3
Czechoslovakia	2

Quarterfinals; 27 May–14 June
Paris, France (clay)
France	5
Italy	0
Copenhagen, Denmark (clay)
Denmark	0
Great Britain	3
Vienna, Austria
Austria	0
India	4
Noordwijk, Netherlands (clay)
Sweden	0
Netherlands	5

Semifinals; 10–14 July
Eastbourne, England (grass)
France	4
Great Britain	0
Noordwijk, Netherlands (clay)
India	1
Netherlands	4

Final; 18–20 July
Noordwijk, Netherlands (clay)
France	4
Netherlands	0

== First round ==
=== Hungary vs. France ===
Hungary
1
Budapest, Hungary
8–10 May 1925
Clay

France
4

			1	2	3	4	5
1	(Hungary) (France)	Imre Takáts; Jean Borotra	2; 6	2; 6	1; 6
2	(Hungary) (France)	Béla von Kehrling; René Lacoste	3; 6	3; 6	3; 6
3	(Hungary) (France)	Béla von Kehrling / Aurél von Kelemen; Jean Borotra / René Lacoste	4; 6	2; 6	10; 8	3; 6
4	(Hungary) (France)	Béla von Kehrling; Jean Borotra	6; 8	6; 1	6; 4	6; 2
5	(Hungary) (France)	Imre Takáts; Paul Féret	1; 6	0; 6	2; 6

=== Portugal vs. Italy ===
Portugal
1
Lisbon, Portugal
8–10 May 1925
Clay

Italy
4

			1	2	3	4	5
1	(Portugal) (Italy)	José de Verda; Clemente Serventi	7; 5	1; 6	8; 6	4; 6		retired
2	(Portugal) (Italy)	Antonio Casanovas; Uberto De Morpurgo	0; 6	1; 6	2; 6
3	(Portugal) (Italy)	Antonio Casanovas / Fernando Vasconcelos; Uberto De Morpurgo / Placido Gaslini	3; 6	1; 6	6; 3	7; 9
4	(Portugal) (Italy)	Antonio Casanovas; Clemente Serventi	6; 4	4; 6	6; 2	4; 6	8; 6
5	(Portugal) (Italy)	José de Verda; Uberto De Morpurgo	2; 6	1; 6	8; 6	2; 6

=== Denmark vs. Romania ===
Denmark
4
Roehampton Lawn Tennis Club, London, England
12–14 May 1925
Clay

Romania
1

			1	2	3	4	5
1	(Denmark) (Romania)	Erik Worm; Nicolae Mișu	3; 6	3; 6	7; 5	3; 6
2	(Denmark) (Romania)	Einer Ulrich; Gheorghe Lupu	6; 1	6; 2	8; 6
3	(Denmark) (Romania)	Povl Henriksen / Einer Ulrich; Gheorghe Lupu / Nicolae Mișu	7; 5	6; 0	6; 1
4	(Denmark) (Romania)	Erik Worm; Gheorghe Lupu	6; 2	6; 2	6; 4
5	(Denmark) (Romania)	Einer Ulrich; Nicolae Mișu	7; 5	6; 1	6; 2

=== Poland vs. Great Britain ===
Poland
0
Warsaw Lawn Tennis Club, Warsaw, Poland
15–17 May 1925
Clay

Great Britain
5

			1	2	3	4	5
1	(Poland) (United Kingdom)	Wladyslaw Szwede; Gordon Lowe	0; 6	1; 6	1; 6
2	(Poland) (United Kingdom)	Alfons Foerster; Patrick Wheatley	1; 6	2; 6	1; 6
3	(Poland) (United Kingdom)	Władysław Kuchar / Karol Steinert; Leslie Godfree / Charles Kingsley	4; 6	2; 6	2; 6
4	(Poland) (United Kingdom)	Alfons Foerster; Gordon Lowe	0; 6	0; 6	0; 6
5	(Poland) (United Kingdom)	Wladyslaw Szwede; Patrick Wheatley	2; 6	0; 6	0; 6

=== Austria vs. Ireland ===
Austria
4
Vienna, Austria
15–19 May 1925

Ireland
1

			1	2	3	4	5
1	(Austria) (Republic of Ireland)	Ludwig Salm-Hoogstraeten; Charles Scroope	0; 6	2; 6	6; 3	6; 2	6; 3
2	(Austria) (Republic of Ireland)	Paul Brick; Louis Meldon	6; 4	6; 2	6; 4
3	(Austria) (Republic of Ireland)	Paul Brick / Ludwig Salm-Hoogstraeten; Charles Scroope / Simon Scroope	1; 6	4; 6	6; 0	5; 7
4	(Austria) (Republic of Ireland)	Ludwig Salm-Hoogstraeten; Louis Meldon	8; 10	4; 6	7; 5	8; 6	6; 1
5	(Austria) (Republic of Ireland)	Paul Brick; Charles Scroope	5; 7	1; 6	7; 5			retired

=== Belgium vs. India ===
Belgium
2
Brussels, Belgium
16–18 May 1925

India
3

			1	2	3	4	5
1	(Belgium) (India)	Jean Washer; Sydney Jacob	4; 6	6; 4	3; 6	7; 5	4; 6
2	(Belgium) (India)	Georges Watson; Eric Andrea	0; 6	3; 6	0; 6
3	(Belgium) (India)	Jean Washer / Georges Watson; Syed Mohammad Hadi / Jagat-Mohan Lal	4; 6	2; 6	6; 4	7; 5	6; 3
4	(Belgium) (India)	Georges Watson; Sydney Jacob	3; 6	1; 6	3; 6
5	(Belgium) (India)	Jean Washer; Eric Andrea	7; 5	6; 1	6; 1

=== Switzerland vs. Sweden ===
Switzerland
2
Bern, Switzerland
16–18 May 1925
Clay

Sweden
3

			1	2	3	4	5
1	(Switzerland) (Sweden)	Charles Aeschlimann; Sune Malmström	3; 6	3; 6	9; 7	3; 6
2	(Switzerland) (Sweden)	Charles Martin; Marcus Wallenberg	1; 6	3; 6	3; 6
3	(Switzerland) (Sweden)	Charles Aeschlimann / Charles Martin; Sune Malmström / Marcus Wallenberg	3; 6	7; 5	7; 5	7; 5
4	(Switzerland) (Sweden)	Charles Martin; Sune Malmström	1; 6	2; 6	1; 6
5	(Switzerland) (Sweden)	Charles Aeschlimann; Marcus Wallenberg	6; 3	6; 3	5; 7	6; 4

=== Netherlands vs. Czechoslovakia ===
Netherlands
3
Noordwijk, Netherlands
15–18 May 1925
Clay

Czechoslovakia
2

			1	2	3	4	5
1	(Netherlands) (Czechoslovakia)	Arthur Diemer-Kool; Pavel Macenauer	6; 3	3; 6	2; 6	1; 6
2	(Netherlands) (Czechoslovakia)	Hendrik Timmer; Jan Koželuh	6; 3	6; 4	6; 2
3	(Netherlands) (Czechoslovakia)	Arthur Diemer-Kool / Christiaan van Lennep; Jan Koželuh / Ladislav Žemla	6; 3	6; 1	8; 6
4	(Netherlands) (Czechoslovakia)	Arthur Diemer-Kool; Jan Koželuh	6; 3	3; 6	6; 3	1; 6	1; 6
5	(Netherlands) (Czechoslovakia)	Hendrik Timmer; Pavel Macenauer	6; 1	6; 2	6; 2

== Quarterfinals ==
=== France vs. Italy ===
France
5
Racing Club de France, Paris, France
12–14 June 1925
Clay

Italy
0

			1	2	3	4	5
1	(France) (Italy)	René Lacoste; Uberto De Morpurgo	6; 0	6; 2	2; 6	6; 0
2	(France) (Italy)	Jean Borotra; Cesare Colombo	6; 4	6; 1	6; 1
3	(France) (Italy)	Jacques Brugnon / René Lacoste; Cesare Colombo / Uberto De Morpurgo	6; 1	6; 1	6; 1
4	(France) (Italy)	Jean Borotra; Uberto De Morpurgo	6; 1	2; 6	12; 10	6; 1
5	(France) (Italy)	Paul Féret; Cesare Colombo	8; 6	3; 6	1; 6	6; 2	6; 3

=== Denmark vs. Great Britain ===
Denmark
0
Copenhagen, Denmark
27–29 May 1925
Clay

Great Britain
3

			1	2	3	4	5
1	(Denmark) (United Kingdom)	Axel Petersen; Patrick Wheatley	6; 4	4; 6	6; 1	2; 6	2; 6
2	(Denmark) (United Kingdom)	Einer Ulrich; Brian Gilbert	1; 6	11; 9	6; 3	4; 6	2; 6
3	(Denmark) (United Kingdom)	Einer Ulrich / Erik Worm; Leslie Godfree / Charles Kingsley	5; 7	5; 7	2; 6
4	(Denmark) (United Kingdom)	Einer Ulrich; Patrick Wheatley						not played
5	(Denmark) (United Kingdom)	Axel Petersen; Brian Gilbert						not played

=== Austria vs. India ===
Austria
0
Vienna, Austria
12–14 June 1925

India
4

			1	2	3	4	5
1	(Austria) (India)	Paul Brick; Sydney Jacob	6; 8	1; 6	1; 6
2	(Austria) (India)	Ludwig Salm-Hoogstraeten; Eric Andrea	4; 6	2; 6	6; 8
3	(Austria) (India)	Otto Relly / Ludwig Salm-Hoogstraeten; Hassan Ali Fyzee / Jagat-Mohan Lal	0; 6	3; 6	1; 6
4	(Austria) (India)	Ludwig Salm-Hoogstraeten; Sydney Jacob	4; 6	4; 6	5; 7
5	(Austria) (India)	Paul Brick; Eric Andrea	2; 6	7; 5	6; 4	2; 3		not completed

=== Netherlands vs. Sweden ===
Netherlands
5
Noordwijksche Sportverening, Noordwijk, Netherlands
12–14 June 1925
Clay

Sweden
0

			1	2	3	4	5
1	(Netherlands) (Sweden)	Hendrik Timmer; Carl-Erik von Braun	7; 5	6; 1	6; 0
2	(Netherlands) (Sweden)	Arthur Diemer-Kool; Marcus Wallenberg	6; 2	4; 6	6; 3	6; 0
3	(Netherlands) (Sweden)	Arthur Diemer-Kool / Christiaan van Lennep; Carl-Erik von Braun / Marcus Wallenberg	3; 6	6; 1	6; 4	9; 7
4	(Netherlands) (Sweden)	Hendrik Timmer; Marcus Wallenberg	6; 1	6; 4	6; 2
5	(Netherlands) (Sweden)	Arthur Diemer-Kool; Carl-Erik von Braun	8; 6	6; 1	6; 2

== Semifinals ==
=== Great Britain vs. France ===
Great Britain
0
Devonshire Park Lawn Tennis Club, Eastbourne, England
11–14 July 1925
Grass

France
4

			1	2	3	4	5
1	(United Kingdom) (France)	Noel Turnbull; René Lacoste	6; 3	1; 6	5; 7	2; 6
2	(United Kingdom) (France)	Gordon Crole-Rees; Jean Borotra	4; 6	8; 10	6; 4	0; 6
3	(United Kingdom) (France)	Leslie Godfree / Patrick Wheatley; Jacques Brugnon / René Lacoste	4; 6	4; 6	3; 6
4	(United Kingdom) (France)	Gordon Crole-Rees; René Lacoste	2; 6	4; 6	2; 6
5	(United Kingdom) (France)	Noel Turnbull; Jean Borotra						not played

=== Netherlands vs. India ===
Netherlands
4
Noordwijk, Netherlands
10–12 July 1925
Clay

India
1

			1	2	3	4	5
1	(Netherlands) (India)	Arthur Diemer-Kool; Jagat-Mohan Lal	3; 6	6; 3	6; 4	6; 1
2	(Netherlands) (India)	Christiaan van Lennep; Hassan Ali Fyzee	1; 6	4; 6	11; 9	6; 3	4; 6
3	(Netherlands) (India)	Arthur Diemer-Kool / Christiaan van Lennep; Hassan Ali Fyzee / Syed Mohammad Hadi	6; 4	6; 2	6; 3
4	(Netherlands) (India)	Arthur Diemer-Kool; Hassan Ali Fyzee	7; 5	6; 1	6; 4
5	(Netherlands) (India)	Christiaan van Lennep; Jagat-Mohan Lal	6; 2	6; 4	7; 5

== Final ==
=== Netherlands vs. France ===
Netherlands
0
Noordwijk Club, Noordwijk, Netherlands (clay)
18–20 July 1925
Clay

France
4

			1	2	3	4	5
1	(Netherlands) (France)	Hendrik Timmer; René Lacoste	7; 5	5; 7	2; 6	2; 6
2	(Netherlands) (France)	Arthur Diemer Kool; Jean Borotra	2; 6	4; 6	8; 10
3	(Netherlands) (France)	Arthur Diemer Kool / Christiaan van Lennep; Jacques Brugnon / René Lacoste	2; 6	3; 6	8; 6	4; 6
4	(Netherlands) (France)	Arthur Diemer Kool; René Lacoste	4; 6	4; 6	1; 6
5	(Netherlands) (France)	Hendrik Timmer; Jean Borotra						not played
