= 1932 International Lawn Tennis Challenge Europe Zone =

International tennis competition

Details
- Duration: 3 May – 17 July 1932
- Teams: 22
- Categories: 1932 Europe Zone; 1932 America Zone

Champion
- Winning nation: Germany; Qualified for: 1932 Inter-Zonal Final

The Europe Zone was one of the two regional zones of the 1932 International Lawn Tennis Challenge.

22 teams entered the Europe Zone, with the winner going on to compete in the Inter-Zonal Final against the winner of the America Zone. Germany defeated Italy in the final, and went on to face the United States in the Inter-Zonal Final.

== Draw ==
First Round; 3–12 May
Denmark
bye
Yugoslavia
bye
Greece
bye
Japan
bye
Spain
bye
Italy	3
Egypt	2
Norway	0
Monaco	5
Belgium	0
Switzerland	5
Czechoslovakia	2
Austria	3
Germany	5
India	0
Hungary	5
Finland	0
bye
Ireland
bye
Great Britain
bye
Romania
bye
Poland
bye
Netherlands

Second Round; 11–23 May
Copenhagen, Denmark
Denmark	4
Yugoslavia	1
Athens, Greece
Greece	0
Japan	5
Rome, Italy (clay)
Spain	1
Italy	4
Lucerne, Switzerland
Monaco	2
Switzerland	3
Vienna, Austria
Austria	2
Germany	3
Dublin, Ireland (grass)
Hungary	1
Ireland	4
Torquay, England (clay)
Great Britain	5
Romania	0
Warsaw, Poland
Poland	4
Netherlands	1

Quarterfinals; 10–14 June
Copenhagen, Denmark
Denmark	0
Japan	5
Montreux, Switzerland
Italy	3
Switzerland	2
Berlin, Germany
Germany	4
Ireland	1
Warsaw, Poland (clay)
Great Britain	4
Poland	1

Semifinals; 8–10 July
Milan, Italy (clay)
Japan	2
Italy	3
Berlin, Germany (clay)
Germany	3
Great Britain	2

Final; 15–17 July
Milan, Italy (clay)
Italy	0
Germany	5

== First round ==
=== Italy vs. Egypt ===
Italy
3
Genoa, Italy
10–12 May 1932
Clay

Egypt
2

			1	2	3	4	5
1	(Italy) (Egypt)	Giorgio de Stefani; Pierre Grandguillot	9; 7	6; 1	6; 4
2	(Italy) (Egypt)	Oscar de Minerbi; Loutfalla Wahid	6; 3	8; 6	6; 8	6; 3
3	(Italy) (Egypt)	Alberto del Bono / Emanuele Sertorio; Jacques Grandguillot / Pierre Grandguillot	2; 6	3; 6	7; 5	4; 6
4	(Italy) (Egypt)	Oscar de Minerbi; Pierre Grandguillot	6; 1	6; 3	1; 6	4; 6	3; 6
5	(Italy) (Egypt)	Giorgio de Stefani; Loutfalla Wahid	6; 5	6; 4	6; 1

=== Norway vs. Monaco ===
Norway
0
Oslo, Norway
5–7 May 1932
Clay

Monaco
5

			1	2	3	4	5
1	(Norway) (Monaco)	Ragnar Hagen; René Gallèpe	3; 6	4; 6	8; 6	1; 6
2	(Norway) (Monaco)	Torleif Torkildsen; Vladimir Landau	5; 7	2; 6	2; 6
3	(Norway) (Monaco)	Johan Haanes / Finn-Trygve Smith; René Gallèpe / Vladimir Landau	1; 6	3; 6	1; 6
4	(Norway) (Monaco)	Ragnar Hagen; Vladimir Landau	1; 6	4; 6	0; 6
5	(Norway) (Monaco)	Johan Haanes; René Gallèpe	1; 6	1; 6	0; 6

=== Belgium vs. Switzerland ===
Belgium
0
Royal Léopold Club, Brussels, Belgium
3–5 May 1932
Clay

Switzerland
5

			1	2	3	4	5
1	(Belgium) (Switzerland)	André Lacroix; Charles Aeschlimann	5; 7	3; 6	0; 6
2	(Belgium) (Switzerland)	Maurice Iwiens-d'Eeckhoutte; Hector Fisher	1; 6	1; 6	2; 6
3	(Belgium) (Switzerland)	Léopold de Borman / André Lacroix; Charles Aeschlimann / Hector Fisher	1; 6	1; 6	4; 6
4	(Belgium) (Switzerland)	Guy van Zuylen; Hector Fisher	6; 8	1; 6	6; 8
5	(Belgium) (Switzerland)	Maurice Iwiens-d'Eeckhoutte; Charles Aeschlimann	3; 6	2; 6	2; 6

=== Czechoslovakia vs. Austria ===
Czechoslovakia
2
Prague, Czechoslovakia
6–8 May 1932

Austria
3

			1	2	3	4	5
1	(Czechoslovakia) (Austria)	Ladislav Hecht; Hermann von Artens	6; 2	3; 6	5; 7	1; 6
2	(Czechoslovakia) (Austria)	Roderich Menzel; Franz-Wilhelm Matejka	3; 6	3; 6	6; 3	6; 2	4; 6
3	(Czechoslovakia) (Austria)	Ferenc Maršálek / Roderich Menzel; Hermann von Artens / Herbert Kinzl	6; 2	6; 1	6; 1
4	(Czechoslovakia) (Austria)	Roderich Menzel; Hermann von Artens	6; 2	6; 1	5; 7	6; 4
5	(Czechoslovakia) (Austria)	Ladislav Hecht; Franz-Wilhelm Matejka	4; 6	4; 6	6; 8

=== Germany vs. India ===
Germany
5
Berlin, Germany
6–8 May 1932

India
0

			1	2	3	4	5
1	(Germany) (India)	Gottfried von Cramm; Janmeja Charanjiva	6; 2	6; 0	6; 1
2	(Germany) (India)	Daniel Prenn; Atri-Madan Mohan	6; 2	7; 5	6; 1
3	(Germany) (India)	Walter Dessart / Eberhard Nourney; Janmeja Charanjiva / Sri-Krishna Prasada	6; 4	2; 6	3; 6	6; 2	6; 3
4	(Germany) (India)	Daniel Prenn; Janmeja Charanjiva	6; 3	6; 1	6; 2
5	(Germany) (India)	Gottfried von Cramm; Atri-Madan Mohan	6; 3	8; 6	6; 3

=== Hungary vs. Finland ===
Hungary
5
Budapest, Hungary
3–5 May 1932

Finland
0

			1	2	3	4	5
1	(Hungary) (Finland)	Béla von Kehrling; Ali Biaudet	6; 1	6; 2	6; 2
2	(Hungary) (Finland)	Emil Gábori; Bo Grotenfelt	6; 0	6; 2	6; 1
3	(Hungary) (Finland)	Emil Gábori / Béla von Kehrling; Ali Biaudet / Bo Grotenfelt	6; 4	6; 3	6; 3
4	(Hungary) (Finland)	Emil Gábori; Ali Biaudet	6; 1	6; 1	6; 1
5	(Hungary) (Finland)	Béla von Kehrling; Bo Grotenfelt	6; 0	6; 3	6; 4

== Second round ==
=== Denmark vs. Yugoslavia ===
Denmark
4
Copenhagen, Denmark
11–14 May 1932

Yugoslavia
1

			1	2	3	4	5
1	(Denmark) (Kingdom of Yugoslavia)	Povl Henriksen; Franjo Šefer	4; 6	0; 6	6; 2	13; 11	6; 1
2	(Denmark) (Kingdom of Yugoslavia)	Einer Ulrich; Franjo Kukuljević	6; 3	7; 5	6; 2
3	(Denmark) (Kingdom of Yugoslavia)	Povl Henriksen / Einer Ulrich; Franjo Kukuljević / Franjo Šefer	6; 3	5; 7	6; 4	6; 4
4	(Denmark) (Kingdom of Yugoslavia)	Povl Henriksen; Franjo Kukuljević	6; 4	6; 8	3; 6	3; 6
5	(Denmark) (Kingdom of Yugoslavia)	Einer Ulrich; Franjo Šefer	3; 6	7; 5	6; 4	11; 9

=== Greece vs. Japan ===
Greece
0
Athens, Greece
14–16 May 1932

Japan
5

			1	2	3	4	5
1	(Greece) (Japan)	Orestis Garangiotis; Takeo Kuwabara	6; 4	7; 5	5; 7	1; 6	8; 10
2	(Greece) (Japan)	Max Balli; Jiro Sato	0; 6	3; 6	3; 6
3	(Greece) (Japan)	Max Balli / I. Georgiadis; Ryuki Miki / Jiro Sato	2; 6	6; 3	4; 6	2; 6
4	(Greece) (Japan)	Georgios Nikolaides; Takeo Kuwabara	3; 6	3; 6	3; 6
5	(Greece) (Japan)	Orestis Garangiotis; Jiro Sato	4; 6	10; 12	3; 6

=== Italy vs. Spain ===
Italy
4
Rome, Italy
15–17 May 1932
Clay

Spain
1

			1	2	3	4	5
1	(Italy) (Spain)	Giorgio de Stefani; Enrique Maier	6; 1	6; 4	6; 0
2	(Italy) (Spain)	Giovanni Palmieri; Antonio Juanico	6; 0	6; 1	6; 2
3	(Italy) (Spain)	Alberto del Bono / Oscar de Minerbi; Enrique Maier / José María Tejada	7; 5	2; 6	2; 6	4; 6
4	(Italy) (Spain)	Giovanni Palmieri; Enrique Maier	2; 6	6; 0	6; 2	5; 2		retired
5	(Italy) (Spain)	Giorgio de Stefani; Antonio Juanico	6; 0	6; 1	6; 2

=== Switzerland vs. Monaco ===
Switzerland
3
Lucerne, Switzerland
21–23 May 1932

Monaco
2

			1	2	3	4	5
1	(Switzerland) (Monaco)	Charles Aeschlimann; René Gallèpe	4; 6	6; 4	6; 3	2; 6	3; 6
2	(Switzerland) (Monaco)	Hector Fisher; Vladimir Landau	6; 0	6; 2	4; 6	6; 4
3	(Switzerland) (Monaco)	Charles Aeschlimann / Hector Fisher; René Gallèpe / Vladimir Landau	2; 6	6; 2	2; 6	7; 5		retired
4	(Switzerland) (Monaco)	Charles Aeschlimann; Vladimir Landau	2; 6	7; 9	6; 8
5	(Switzerland) (Monaco)	Hector Fisher; René Gallèpe	6; 1	6; 1	6; 2

=== Austria vs. Germany ===
Austria
2
Vienna, Austria
21–23 May 1932

Germany
3

			1	2	3	4	5
1	(Austria) (Germany)	Franz-Wilhelm Matejka; Daniel Prenn	2; 6	8; 10	1; 6
2	(Austria) (Germany)	Hermann von Artens; Gottfried von Cramm	2; 6	0; 6	4; 6
3	(Austria) (Germany)	Hermann von Artens / Franz-Wilhelm Matejka; Gottfried von Cramm / Walter Dessart	6; 3	7; 5	6; 4
4	(Austria) (Germany)	Franz-Wilhelm Matejka; Gottfried von Cramm	2; 6	6; 2	3; 6	7; 5	6; 8
5	(Austria) (Germany)	Hermann von Artens; Daniel Prenn	6; 4	6; 2	6; 3

=== Ireland vs. Hungary ===
Ireland
4
Fitzwilliam Lawn Tennis Club, Dublin, Ireland
19–21 May 1932
Grass

Hungary
1

			1	2	3	4	5
1	(Republic of Ireland) (Hungary)	George Lyttleton-Rogers; Emil Gábori	7; 5	3; 6	6; 4	7; 5
2	(Republic of Ireland) (Hungary)	Edward McGuire; Béla von Kehrling	3; 6	2; 6	4; 6
3	(Republic of Ireland) (Hungary)	George Lyttleton-Rogers / Edward McGuire; Emil Gábori / Béla von Kehrling	4; 6	7; 5	6; 4	6; 3
4	(Republic of Ireland) (Hungary)	George Lyttleton-Rogers; Béla von Kehrling	6; 0	6; 3	6; 3
5	(Republic of Ireland) (Hungary)	Edward McGuire; Emil Gábori	6; 1	8; 6	6; 2

=== Great Britain vs. Romania ===
Great Britain
5
Abbey Park Gardens, Torquay, England
14–16 May 1932
Clay

Romania
0

			1	2	3	4	5
1	(United Kingdom) (Romania)	Fred Perry; Nicolae Mișu	6; 0	6; 1	6; 1
2	(United Kingdom) (Romania)	Herman David; Ghica Poulieff	7; 5	7; 5	6; 1
3	(United Kingdom) (Romania)	Pat Hughes / Fred Perry; Nicolae Mișu / Ghica Poulieff	6; 0	6; 1	6; 1
4	(United Kingdom) (Romania)	Herman David; Nicolae Mișu	4; 6	6; 0	8; 6	3; 6	6; 4
5	(United Kingdom) (Romania)	Fred Perry; Ghica Poulieff	6; 1	6; 2	6; 1

=== Poland vs. Netherlands ===
Poland
4
Warsaw, Poland
15–17 May 1932

Netherlands
1

			1	2	3	4	5
1	(Poland) (Netherlands)	Ignacy Tłoczyński; Hendrik Timmer	7; 5	6; 3	6; 4
2	(Poland) (Netherlands)	Maksymilian Stolarow; Tod Hughan	6; 8	6; 2	5; 7	6; 0	6; 0
3	(Poland) (Netherlands)	Jerzy Stolarow / Ignacy Tłoczyński; Tod Hughan / Ody Koopman	6; 3	15; 17	6; 3	3; 6	5; 7
4	(Poland) (Netherlands)	Ignacy Tłoczyński; Tod Hughan	6; 3	6; 4	6; 2
5	(Poland) (Netherlands)	Maksymilian Stolarow; Hendrik Timmer	6; 4	6; 2	5; 7	4; 6	6; 4

== Quarterfinals ==
=== Denmark vs. Japan ===
Denmark
0
Copenhagen, Denmark
10–12 June 1932

Japan
5

			1	2	3	4	5
1	(Denmark) (Japan)	Anker Jacobsen; Jiro Sato	1; 6	2; 6	4; 6
2	(Denmark) (Japan)	Einer Ulrich; Takeo Kuwabara	4; 6	2; 6	0; 6
3	(Denmark) (Japan)	Povl Henriksen / Einer Ulrich; Ryuki Miki / Jiro Sato	3; 6	6; 4	2; 6	2; 6
4	(Denmark) (Japan)	Anker Jacobsen; Takeo Kuwabara	7; 5	6; 2	3; 6	0; 6	1; 6
5	(Denmark) (Japan)	Einer Ulrich; Jiro Sato	6; 4	3; 6	5; 7	5; 7

=== Switzerland vs. Italy ===
Switzerland
2
Montreux, Switzerland
11–14 June 1932

Italy
3

			1	2	3	4	5
1	(Switzerland) (Italy)	Hector Fisher; Giovanni Palmieri	6; 8	6; 4	1; 6	6; 1	6; 3
2	(Switzerland) (Italy)	Charles Aeschlimann; Giorgio de Stefani	4; 6	5; 7	6; 8
3	(Switzerland) (Italy)	Charles Aeschlimann / Hector Fisher; Giovanni Palmieri / Emanuele Sertorio	6; 3	4; 6	4; 6	4; 6
4	(Switzerland) (Italy)	Charles Aeschlimann; Giovanni Palmieri	3; 6	1; 6	5; 7
5	(Switzerland) (Italy)	Hector Fisher; Giorgio de Stefani	3; 6	0; 6	9; 7	8; 6	8; 6

=== Germany vs. Ireland ===
Germany
4
Berlin, Germany
10–12 June 1932

Ireland
1

			1	2	3	4	5
1	(Germany) (Republic of Ireland)	Gottfried von Cramm; George Lyttleton-Rogers	4; 6	8; 10	6; 4	7; 5	4; 6
2	(Germany) (Republic of Ireland)	Daniel Prenn; Edward McGuire	6; 1	6; 1	6; 1
3	(Germany) (Republic of Ireland)	Gottfried von Cramm / Daniel Prenn; George Lyttleton-Rogers / Edward McGuire	6; 4	6; 3	3; 6	8; 6
4	(Germany) (Republic of Ireland)	Daniel Prenn; George Lyttleton-Rogers	6; 2	7; 5	6; 2
5	(Germany) (Republic of Ireland)	Gottfried von Cramm; Edward McGuire	6; 2	6; 4	6; 2

=== Poland vs. Great Britain ===
Poland
1
Warsaw Lawn Tennis Club, Warsaw, Poland
10–12 June 1932
Clay

Great Britain
4

			1	2	3	4	5
1	(Poland) (United Kingdom)	Maksymilian Stolarow; Harry Lee	4; 6	3; 6	3; 6
2	(Poland) (United Kingdom)	Ignacy Tłoczyński; Fred Perry	5; 7	6; 8	2; 6
3	(Poland) (United Kingdom)	Józef Hebda / Przemyslaw Warminski; Pat Hughes / Fred Perry	0; 6	2; 6	0; 6
4	(Poland) (United Kingdom)	Maksymilian Stolarow; Fred Perry	3; 6	5; 7	4; 6
5	(Poland) (United Kingdom)	Ignacy Tłoczyński; Harry Lee	6; 4	6; 4	2; 6	7; 5

== Semifinals ==
=== Italy vs. Japan ===
Italy
3
Milan, Italy
8–10 July 1932
Clay

Japan
2

			1	2	3	4	5
1	(Italy) (Japan)	Giorgio de Stefani; Jiro Sato	6; 3	6; 4	6; 4
2	(Italy) (Japan)	Giovanni Palmieri; Takeo Kuwabara	0; 6	2; 6	6; 1	3; 6
3	(Italy) (Japan)	Giovanni Palmieri / Emanuele Sertorio; Ryuki Miki / Jiro Sato	4; 6	4; 6	3; 6
4	(Italy) (Japan)	Giovanni Palmieri; Jiro Sato	4; 6	4; 6	6; 1	6; 1	6; 2
5	(Italy) (Japan)	Giorgio de Stefani; Takeo Kuwabara	6; 2	6; 2	6; 4

=== Germany vs. Great Britain ===
Germany
3
Rot-Weiss Tennis Club, Berlin, Germany
8–10 July 1932
Clay

Great Britain
2

			1	2	3	4	5
1	(Germany) (United Kingdom)	Daniel Prenn; Bunny Austin	6; 0	8; 10	6; 2	6; 3
2	(Germany) (United Kingdom)	Gottfried von Cramm; Fred Perry	1; 6	2; 6	3; 6
3	(Germany) (United Kingdom)	Walter Dessart / Daniel Prenn; Pat Hughes / Fred Perry	3; 6	4; 6	4; 6
4	(Germany) (United Kingdom)	Gottfried von Cramm; Bunny Austin	5; 7	6; 2	6; 3	6; 2
5	(Germany) (United Kingdom)	Daniel Prenn; Fred Perry	6; 2	6; 4	3; 6	0; 6	7; 5

== Final ==
=== Italy vs. Germany ===
Italy
0
Milan, Italy
15–17 July 1932
Clay

Germany
5

			1	2	3	4	5
1	(Italy) (Germany)	Giovanni Palmieri; Gottfried von Cramm	3; 6	4; 6	0; 6
2	(Italy) (Germany)	Giorgio de Stefani; Daniel Prenn	1; 6	4; 6	6; 1	2; 6
3	(Italy) (Germany)	Alberto del Bono / Giorgio de Stefani; Gottfried von Cramm / Daniel Prenn	3; 6	3; 6	2; 6
4	(Italy) (Germany)	Giovanni Palmieri; Gustav Jaenecke	3; 6	6; 0	1; 6	6; 2	1; 6
5	(Italy) (Germany)	Alberto del Bono; Gottfried von Cramm	6; 8	3; 6	6; 3	1; 6
