= 1924 International Lawn Tennis Challenge Europe Zone =

International tennis competition

The Europe Zone was one of the two regional zones of the 1924 International Lawn Tennis Challenge.

17 teams entered the Europe Zone, with the winner going on to compete in the Inter-Zonal Final against the winner of the America Zone. France defeated the Czechoslovakia in the final, and went on to face Australia in the Inter-Zonal Final.

== Draw ==
First round
Torquay, England (clay)
Great Britain	3
Belgium	2

Second round
Birmingham, England (grass)
Great Britain	3
Spain	2
Argentina
South Africa	w/o
Arnhem, Netherlands (clay)
Netherlands	1
India	4
Dublin, Ireland (grass)
Ireland	0
France	5
Copenhagen, Denmark
Hungary	2
Denmark	3
Romania
Italy	w/o
Prague, Czechoslovakia
Czechoslovakia	4
New Zealand	0
Vienna, Austria
Switzerland	4
Austria	1

Quarterfinals
Scarborough, England (grass)
Great Britain	4
South Africa	1
Paris, France (clay)
India	0
France	4
Copenhagen, Denmark
Denmark	3
Italy	2
Prague, Czechoslovakia
Czechoslovakia	4
Switzerland	1

Semifinals
Eastbourne, England (grass)
Great Britain	1
France	4
Copenhagen, Denmark
Denmark	2
Czechoslovakia	3

Final
Évian-les-Bains, France (clay)
France	5
Czechoslovakia	0

== First round ==
=== Great Britain vs. Belgium ===
Great Britain
3
Abbey Park Gardens, Torquay, England
12–14 May 1924
Clay

Belgium
2

			1	2	3	4	5
1	(United Kingdom) (Belgium)	Algernon Kingscote; Georges Watson	7; 5	6; 2	6; 3
2	(United Kingdom) (Belgium)	Brian Gilbert; Jean Washer	3; 6	9; 7	6; 2	4; 6	6; 8
3	(United Kingdom) (Belgium)	Leslie Godfree / Max Woosnam; Jean Washer / Georges Watson	6; 4	8; 6	6; 4
4	(United Kingdom) (Belgium)	Algernon Kingscote; Jean Washer	3; 6	3; 6	3; 6
5	(United Kingdom) (Belgium)	Brian Gilbert; Georges Watson	6; 4	6; 3	6; 1

== Second round ==
=== Great Britain vs. Spain ===
Great Britain
3
Edgbaston Lawn Tennis Society, Birmingham, England
31 May–3 June 1924
Grass

Spain
2

			1	2	3	4	5
1	(United Kingdom) (Spain)	Patrick Wheatley; Eduardo Flaquer	6; 3	1; 6	8; 6	6; 1
2	(United Kingdom) (Spain)	Brian Gilbert; Manuel Alonso Areizaga	2; 6	7; 9	6; 3	6; 4	4; 6
3	(United Kingdom) (Spain)	Leslie Godfree / Max Woosnam; Manuel Alonso Areizaga / Eduardo Flaquer	6; 1	6; 4	6; 8	6; 2
4	(United Kingdom) (Spain)	Patrick Wheatley; Manuel Alonso Areizaga	3; 6	7; 9	6; 2	4; 6
5	(United Kingdom) (Spain)	Brian Gilbert; José María Alonso Areizaga	6; 0	6; 4	6; 0

=== Netherlands vs. India ===
Netherlands
1
Arnhem, Netherlands
29–31 May 1924
Clay

India
4

			1	2	3	4	5
1	(Netherlands) (India)	Christiaan van Lennep; Sydney Jacob	6; 0	6; 3	2; 6	5; 7	7; 9
2	(Netherlands) (India)	Hendrik Timmer; Mohammed Sleem	0; 6	2; 6	2; 6
3	(Netherlands) (India)	Christiaan van Lennep / Hendrik Timmer; Syed Mohammad Hadi / Sydney Jacob	6; 4	4; 6	3; 6	6; 2	6; 4
4	(Netherlands) (India)	Hendrik Timmer; Sydney Jacob	6; 3	6; 8	3; 6	6; 2	1; 6
5	(Netherlands) (India)	Christiaan van Lennep; Mohammed Sleem	3; 6	3; 6	5; 7

=== Ireland vs. France ===
Ireland
0
Fitzwilliam Lawn Tennis Club, Dublin, Ireland
31 May–3 June 1924
Grass

France
5

			1	2	3	4	5
1	(Republic of Ireland) (France)	D'Arcy McCrea; Jean Couiteas	3; 6	6; 8	6; 3	6; 4	5; 7
2	(Republic of Ireland) (France)	Shirley Dillon; René Lacoste	1; 6	2; 6	2; 6
3	(Republic of Ireland) (France)	Shirley Dillon / Louis Meldon; Jacques Brugnon / René Lacoste	6; 8	1; 6	2; 6
4	(Republic of Ireland) (France)	Shirley Dillon; Jean Couiteas	6; 4	6; 1	2; 6	9; 11	2; 6
5	(Republic of Ireland) (France)	D'Arcy McCrea; René Lacoste	1; 6	3; 6	1; 6

=== Denmark vs. Hungary ===
Denmark
3
Copenhagen, Denmark
16–18 May 1924

Hungary
2

			1	2	3	4	5
1	(Denmark) (Hungary)	Axel Petersen; Imre Takáts	6; 2	6; 3	6; 3
2	(Denmark) (Hungary)	Einer Ulrich; Béla von Kehrling	8; 10	0; 6	4; 6
3	(Denmark) (Hungary)	Bjorn Thalbitzer / Einer Ulrich; Béla von Kehrling / Jenő Péteri	7; 5	7; 5	1; 6	5; 7	7; 5
4	(Denmark) (Hungary)	Axel Petersen; Béla von Kehrling	2; 6	4; 6	3; 6
5	(Denmark) (Hungary)	Einer Ulrich; Imre Takáts	6; 0	4; 6	6; 2	6; 3

=== Czechoslovakia vs. New Zealand ===
Czechoslovakia
4
Prague, Czechoslovakia
22–24 May 1924

New Zealand
0

			1	2	3	4	5
1	(Czechoslovakia) (New Zealand)	Friedrich Rohrer; Frank Fisher	3; 6	6; 0	6; 4	0; 6	6; 4
2	(Czechoslovakia) (New Zealand)	Ladislav Žemla; John Peacock	7; 5	6; 4	7; 5
3	(Czechoslovakia) (New Zealand)	Jan Koželuh / Ladislav Žemla; Frank Fisher / John Peacock	4; 6	6; 3	6; 8	6; 2	7; 5
4	(Czechoslovakia) (New Zealand)	Friedrich Rohrer; John Peacock	6; 2	7; 5	6; 3
5	(Czechoslovakia) (New Zealand)	Ladislav Žemla; Frank Fisher						not played

=== Austria vs. Switzerland ===
Austria
1
Vienna, Austria
17–20 May 1924

Switzerland
4

			1	2	3	4	5
1	(Austria) (Switzerland)	Paul Brick; Charles Aeschlimann	2; 6	3; 6	3; 6
2	(Austria) (Switzerland)	Ludwig Salm-Hoogstraeten; Charles Martin	8; 6	6; 4	6; 2
3	(Austria) (Switzerland)	Ludwig Salm-Hoogstraeten / Otto Salm; Charles Aeschlimann / Guy Sautter	6; 2	3; 6	4; 6	4; 6
4	(Austria) (Switzerland)	Ludwig Salm-Hoogstraeten; Charles Aeschlimann	5; 7	6; 8	5; 7
5	(Austria) (Switzerland)	Paul Brick; Charles Martin	2; 6	6; 3	8; 6	5; 7	2; 6

== Quarterfinals ==
=== Great Britain vs. South Africa ===
Great Britain
4
Yorkshire Lawn Tennis Club, Scarborough, England
9–11 June 1924
Grass

South Africa
1

			1	2	3	4	5
1	(United Kingdom) (South Africa)	Patrick Wheatley; Patrick Spence	6; 4	6; 3	6; 3
2	(United Kingdom) (South Africa)	Brian Gilbert; Louis Raymond	6; 1	4; 6	6; 2	3; 6	8; 6
3	(United Kingdom) (South Africa)	Leslie Godfree / Max Woosnam; Louis Raymond / Patrick Spence	9; 11	5; 7	4; 6
4	(United Kingdom) (South Africa)	Patrick Wheatley; Ivie Richardson	6; 3	6; 4	6; 4
5	(United Kingdom) (South Africa)	Brian Gilbert; Patrick Spence	4; 6	6; 1	6; 1	6; 1

=== France vs. India ===
France
4
Racing Club de France, Paris, France
17–19 June 1924
Clay

India
0

			1	2	3	4	5
1	(France) (India)	René Lacoste; Mohammed Sleem	4; 6	6; 4	6; 2	6; 4
2	(France) (India)	Henri Cochet; Sydney Jacob	6; 4	4; 6	6; 4	6; 2
3	(France) (India)	Jacques Brugnon / Henri Cochet; Hassan Ali Fyzee / Syed Mohammad Hadi	6; 1	6; 4	7; 5
4	(France) (India)	Henri Cochet; Mohammed Sleem	6; 4	0; 6	6; 4	2; 6	6; 0
5	(France) (India)	René Lacoste; Sydney Jacob						not played

=== Denmark vs. Italy ===
Denmark
3
Copenhagen, Denmark
14–16 June 1924

Italy
2

			1	2	3	4	5
1	(Denmark) (Italy)	Erik Tegner; Cesare Colombo	6; 0	8; 6	3; 6	6; 4
2	(Denmark) (Italy)	Axel Petersen; Uberto De Morpurgo	5; 7	2; 6	2; 6
3	(Denmark) (Italy)	Erik Tegner / Einer Ulrich; Cesare Colombo / Uberto De Morpurgo	7; 5	7; 5	4; 6	6; 0
4	(Denmark) (Italy)	Erik Tegner; Uberto De Morpurgo	3; 6	1; 6	3; 6
5	(Denmark) (Italy)	Axel Petersen; Cesare Colombo	6; 2	6; 3	6; 4

=== Czechoslovakia vs. Switzerland ===
Czechoslovakia
4
Prague, Czechoslovakia
4–6 June 1924

Switzerland
1

			1	2	3	4	5
1	(Czechoslovakia) (Switzerland)	Friedrich Rohrer; Charles Martin	2; 6	6; 2	6; 3	8; 6
2	(Czechoslovakia) (Switzerland)	Ladislav Žemla; Charles Aeschlimann	3; 6	6; 8	6; 4	6; 1	1; 6
3	(Czechoslovakia) (Switzerland)	Jan Koželuh / Ladislav Žemla; Charles Aeschlimann / Guy Sautter	6; 2	6; 3	6; 2
4	(Czechoslovakia) (Switzerland)	Friedrich Rohrer; Charles Aeschlimann	2; 6	4; 6	7; 5	6; 2	6; 4
5	(Czechoslovakia) (Switzerland)	Ladislav Žemla; Charles Martin	6; 2	6; 2	6; 2

== Semifinals ==
=== Great Britain vs. France ===
Great Britain
1
Devonshire Park Lawn Tennis Club, Eastbourne, England
26–29 July 1924
Grass

France
4

			1	2	3	4	5
1	(United Kingdom) (France)	Algernon Kingscote; Henri Cochet	6; 3	4; 6	6; 4	3; 6	3; 6
2	(United Kingdom) (France)	Brian Gilbert; René Lacoste	4; 6	5; 7	3; 6
3	(United Kingdom) (France)	Leslie Godfree / Max Woosnam; Jean Borotra / Jacques Brugnon	4; 6	6; 4	3; 6	1; 6
4	(United Kingdom) (France)	Brian Gilbert; Henri Cochet	5; 7	1; 6	9; 7	8; 6	6; 2
5	(United Kingdom) (France)	Algernon Kingscote; René Lacoste	6; 8	6; 3	6; 3	2; 6	4; 6

=== Denmark vs. Czechoslovakia ===
Denmark
2
Copenhagen, Denmark
25–27 July 1924

Czechoslovakia
3

			1	2	3	4	5
1	(Denmark) (Czechoslovakia)	Axel Petersen; Ladislav Žemla	2; 6	5; 7	5; 7
2	(Denmark) (Czechoslovakia)	Erik Worm; Friedrich Rohrer	4; 6	6; 3	6; 3	3; 6	8; 10
3	(Denmark) (Czechoslovakia)	Einer Ulrich / Erik Worm; Jan Koželuh / Ladislav Žemla	1; 6	3; 6	1; 6
4	(Denmark) (Czechoslovakia)	Erik Worm; Ladislav Žemla	6; 2	3; 6	6; 4	10; 8
5	(Denmark) (Czechoslovakia)	Axel Petersen; Friedrich Rohrer	3; 6	6; 3	7; 5	6; 0

== Final ==
=== France vs. Czechoslovakia ===
France
5
Évian Sports Club, Évian-les-Bains, France
3–5 August 1924
Clay

Czechoslovakia
0

			1	2	3	4	5
1	(France) (Czechoslovakia)	René Lacoste; Pavel Macenauer	6; 2	10; 8	6; 4
2	(France) (Czechoslovakia)	Henri Cochet; Ladislav Žemla	6; 1	8; 6	6; 4
3	(France) (Czechoslovakia)	Jacques Brugnon / Henri Cochet; Jan Koželuh / Ladislav Žemla	7; 5	3; 6	6; 4	6; 4
4	(France) (Czechoslovakia)	René Lacoste; Ladislav Žemla	6; 3	6; 2	6; 2
5	(France) (Czechoslovakia)	Henri Cochet; Pavel Macenauer	6; 4	3; 6	7; 5	3; 6	6; 2
