= Hirschel =

Hirschel is a surname and a given name. Notable people with the name include:

Surname:

- Bernhard Hirschel (1815–1874), German physician, writer and liberal activist
- Moses Hirschel (1754–1818), German writer, polemicist and chess author
- Saul Hirschel (1740–1794), German Jewish scholar and writer
- Solomon Hirschel (1762–1842), British rabbi, chief rabbi of the United Kingdom 1802–1842

Given name:

- Hirschel Levin (1721–1800), Chief Rabbi of Great Britain and of Berlin
- Hirschel Halevy Marx (1777–1838), German lawyer, father of the communist philosopher Karl Marx
- Hirschel de Minerbi (1838–1908), Italian diplomat
