= Ferruccio Quintavalle =

Italian tennis player (1914–1998)

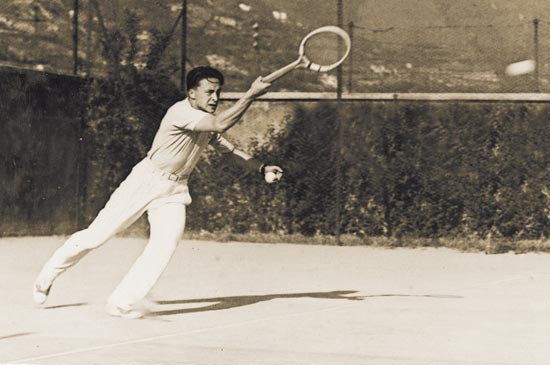
- Country (sports): Italy
- Born: 1914
- Died: 1998 (aged 83–84)
- Plays: Right-handed

Singles

Grand Slam singles results
- French Open: 4R (1947)
- Wimbledon: 2R (1937)
- US Open: 1R (1949)

Ferruccio "Illo" Quintavalle (1914–1998) was an Italian engineer and tennis player.

== Biography ==
A native of Milan, Quintavalle was most active in the 1930s, when he won six national championships in doubles. He played for the Italy Davis Cup team as a doubles specialist from 1934 to 1938, usually partnering Valentino Taroni.

In 1949 he was non-playing captain of the Davis Cup side which reached the Inter-Zonal final.

Quintavalle was general manager of Bianchi and founded automobile manufacturer Autobianchi.

Noted engineer Ercole Marelli was his uncle's father-in-law.

== See also ==
- List of Italy Davis Cup team representatives
