= Augusto Rado =

Italian tennis player

- Country (sports): Italy
- Born: 21 November 1912
- Died: 8 October 1996 (aged 83)

Singles

Grand Slam singles results
- French Open: 3R (1935)

Augusto Rado (21 November 1912 – 8 October 1996) was an Italian tennis player.

An Italian junior champion from Milan, Rado was a lightly built player, known for his speed on court.

Rado competed during the 1930s, with appearances for the Italy Davis Cup team in 1933 and 1934. His 1933 Davis Cup rubbers were in doubles only, then in 1934 he took the spot of Uberto De Morpurgo and featured in six singles rubbers, of which he won three. He made the singles third round of the 1935 French Championships, losing to Don Turnbull.

== See also ==
- List of Italy Davis Cup team representatives
