= Vanni Canepele =

Italian tennis player (1916–1983)

- Full name: Pier Giovanni Canepele
- Country (sports): Italy
- Born: 18 June 1916
- Died: 8 July 1983 (aged 67)

Singles

Grand Slam singles results
- French Open: 3R (1947)
- Wimbledon: 3R (1939, 1949)
- US Open: 1R (1949)

Pier Giovanni "Vanni" Canepele (18 June 1916 – 8 July 1983) was an Italian tennis player.

A native of Bologna, Canepele was a three-time national singles champion. He made the singles third round at Wimbledon twice and played for the Italy Davis Cup team from 1937 to 1939, then again in 1949.

During the 1950s and 1960s, Canepele served several stints as non-playing captain of Italy in the Davis Cup. This included runner-up finishes in 1960 and 1961, both times to Australia.

Canepele played a season of Serie A basketball for Virtus Bologna in 1938–1939.

== See also ==
- List of Italy Davis Cup team representatives
