= Hirschel de Minerbi =

- Born: Oscar Hirschel de Minerbi; April 25, 1838; Trieste, Austrian Empire
- Died: 1908 (aged 69–70)
- Education: University of Padua
- Occupation: Diplomat
- Relatives: Ernesta Stern (sister); Joachim van Hierschl-Minerbi (brother); Lionello Hierschel de Minerbi (son); Oscar de Minerbi (grandson)

Oscar Hirschel de Minerbi (April 25, 1838 – 1908) was an Italian diplomat.

== Biography ==
Oscar Hirschel de Minerbi was born in 1838 into a prosperous and distinguished Jewish family from Trieste. He received his education at the University of Padua, where he earned his law degree in on December 20, 1864.

De Minerbi entered the civil service of Italy on March 20, 1867. His diplomatic career began as an attaché at the Paris legation in August 1867, followed by an assignment in Bern the following year (August 1878). He was next transferred to Constantinople (December 1870), London (July 1871), Bern (June 1872), Brussels (June 1877), and Bucharest (June 1880). Ultimately, he returned to London for a second term in 1889, where he remained until he retired from the service.

Before transitioning to private life, he set aside the sum of 80,000 lire for the establishment of an institute intended to support the welfare of widows and orphans left behind by diplomats.

== Awards ==
De Minerbi was made an Officer of the Order of the Medjidie (December 1870), a Knight of the Order of the Crown of Italy (June 1876), a Knight of the Order of Leopold in (February 1879), a Commander of the Order of the Star of Romania (December 1880), and a Knight of the Order of Saints Maurice and Lazarus (June 1881).
