= Renato Bossi =

Italian film actor and tennis player

- Country (sports): Italy
- Born: 7 December 1917

Singles

Grand Slam singles results
- French Open: 2R (1938, 1947)
- Wimbledon: 1R (1948)

Renato Bossi (born 7 December 1917) was an Italian film actor and tennis player of the 1930s and 1940s.

A Milanese tennis player, Bossi represented Italy in a 1938 Davis Cup tie against France in Paris, where he lost a reverse singles rubber to Pierre Pellizza in five sets. He won the men's doubles and mixed doubles national championships in 1946. As an actor, Bossi's credits include the 1948 Duilio Coletti film Il grido della terra and the 1950 Sergio Grieco film Il sentiero dell'odio. He was married to German tennis player Anneliese Ullstein.

Bossi died at a young age from leukemia. (Note: Other sources attribute his death to a plane accident in 1947, but he was competing in tournaments up until mid-1948.)

== See also ==
- List of Italy Davis Cup team representatives
