= Franz Matejka =

Austrian tennis player

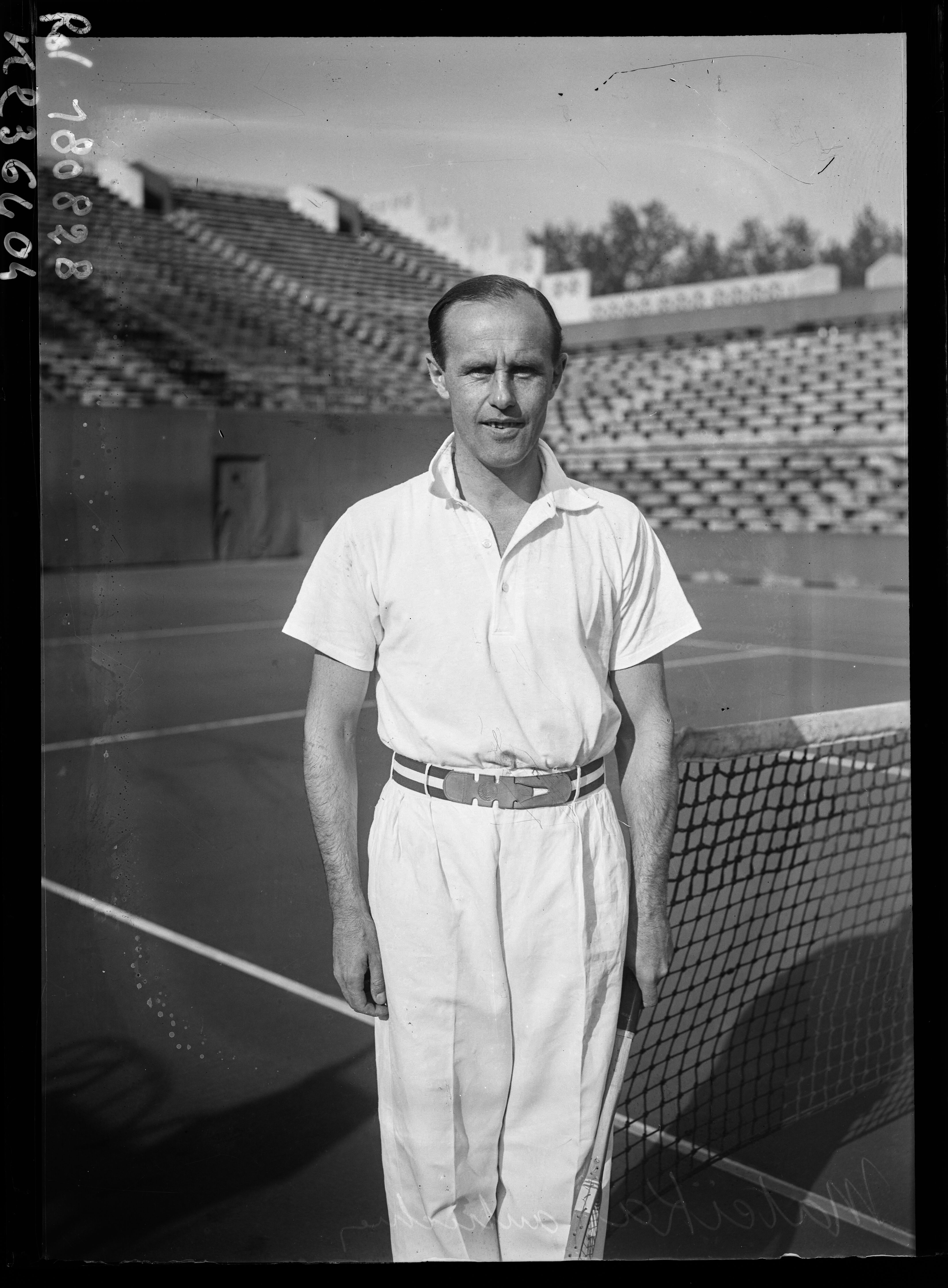
- Full name: Franz-Wilhelm Matejka
- Country (sports): Austria
- Born: 26 December 1896
- Plays: Left-handed

Grand Slam singles results
- French Open: 4R (1928, 1929, 1932)
- Wimbledon: 3R (1928, 1931, 1934)

Franz-Wilhelm Matejka (born 26 December 1896) was an Austrian tennis player.

Matejka, a left-handed player from Vienna, represented Austria in the Davis Cup from 1927 to 1934. In a 1932 tie against Germany he held a match point against Gottfried von Cramm, before falling 6–8 in the fifth set. He had two Davis Cup wins over Roderich Menzel and beat Uberto De Morpurgo in 1933. A six-time national champion, he won the Austrian International Championship in 1934, defeating countryman Georg von Metaxa in the final. He reached the fourth round of the French Championships three times and made it as far as the third round at the Wimbledon Championships.

== See also ==
- List of Austria Davis Cup team representatives
