= Alberto del Bono =

Italian tennis player

- Full name: Alberto Maria del Bono
- Country (sports): Italy
- Born: 28 December 1906 Buenos Aires, Argentina
- Died: 10 August 1998 (aged 91) Coloreto, Parma, Italy

Singles
- Career record: 125-97
- Career titles: 8

Grand Slam singles results
- French Open: 3R (1932, 1935)
- Wimbledon: 2R (1929, 1935)

Count Alberto Maria "Tito" del Bono (28 December 1906 – 10 August 1998) was an Italian tennis player.

Del Bono was a two-time national champion in doubles. In 1929 he was the singles champion in Munich, which was the first edition of the modern day BMW Open. He played Davis Cup for Italy between 1929 and 1932 mainly as a doubles player, for four wins. In his only singles rubber he was beaten in four sets by Gottfried von Cramm in 1932.

A nobleman, del Bono was a nephew of a famous Italian general and served as a lieutenant himself during the war.

== See also ==
- List of Italy Davis Cup team representatives
