= Gheorghe Lupu =

Romanian tennis player

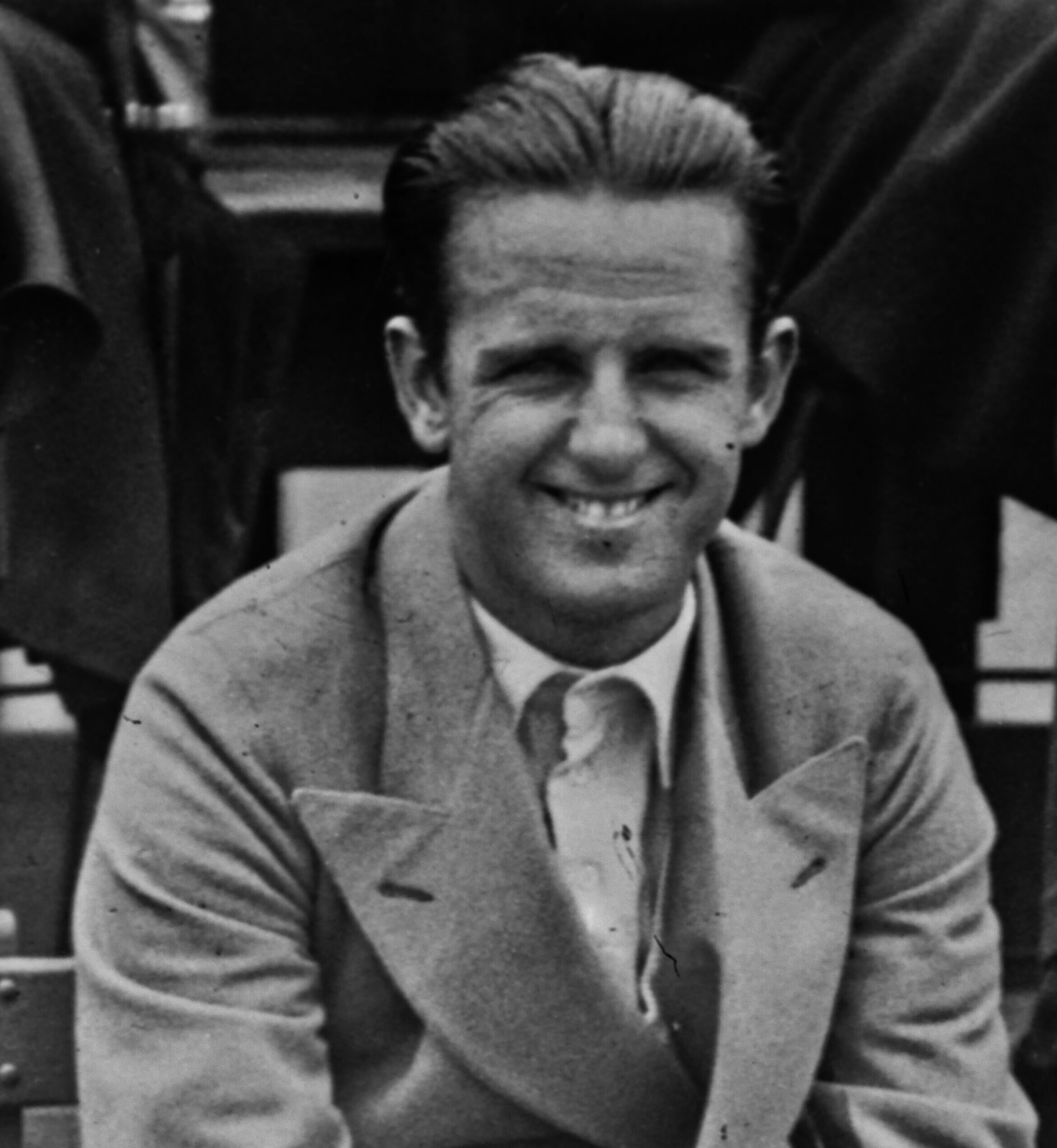
- Gheorghe Lupu in 1929

Personal information
- Nationality: Romanian
- Born: 24 February 1884; Vaslui, Austria-Hungary
- Died: 30 April 1966 (aged 82); Bucharest, Romania

Sport
- Sport: Tennis

Gheorghe Lupu (24 February 1884 – 30 April 1966) was a Romanian tennis player. He competed in the men's singles and doubles events at the 1924 Summer Olympics.
