= Oscar de Minerbi =

Italian tennis player (1908–1951)

- Country (sports): Italy
- Born: 26 February 1908
- Died: 1951 (aged 42–43)

Singles

Grand Slam singles results
- French Open: 3R (1931)

Oscar de Minerbi (26 February 1908 – 1951) was an Italian tennis player.

Born in Paris, de Minerbi hailed from an Italian Jewish noble family, with origins in Trieste. He was the son of tennis player and politician Lionello Hierschel de Minerbi, and grandson of diplomat Oscar Hierschel de Minerbi. On his father's side he was related to the Stern family.

De Minerbi was Italy's national singles champion in 1931 and played Davis Cup tennis the following year. He was a semi-finalist at the Italian International Championships and made it as far as the third round at Roland Garros.

Post tennis, de Minerbi had a career as a diplomat. He had a daughter named Diana who married the son of Scottish Argentine socialite Adelina Munro Drysdale and the Duke of Rignano.

== See also ==
- List of Italy Davis Cup team representatives
