= Giovanni Palmieri (tennis) =

Italian tennis player (1906–1982)

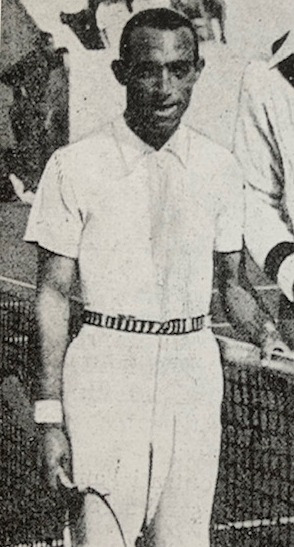
- Country (sports): Italy
- Born: 11 October 1906 Rome, Italy
- Died: 13 February 1982 (aged 75) Bologna, Italy

Grand Slam singles results
- French Open: 3R (1932, 1934)
- Wimbledon: 3R (1935)

Grand Slam doubles results
- Wimbledon: 1R (1935)

Grand Slam mixed doubles results
- Wimbledon: 2R (1932)

Giovanni Palmieri (11 October 1906 – 13 February 1982) was an Italian tennis player who was active during the 1930s.

== Career ==
=== Amateur ===
Palmieri took part in the Wimbledon Championships editions of 1932 and 1935. In 1932 he competed in the singles event and lost in the first round. With Winifred Beamish he played in the mixed doubles event and reached the second round. In 1935 he defeated Hideo Nishimura and Cam Malfroy to reach the third round of the singles event, in which he lost to seventh-seeded Roderich Menzel in straight sets. He teamed up with Valentino Taroni in the doubles event and were defeated in the first round.

At the French Championships he competed in the singles event from 1932 to 1934. At his first participation in 1932 he reached the third round, in which he played 12th-seeded George Lyttleton-Rogers. Palmieri led by two sets to one but eventually lost in five sets. In 1933 he lost in the second round to sixth-seeded Jiro Sato and in his final involvement in 1934 he again reached the third round before losing to fourth-seeded and eventual champion Gottfried von Cramm in five sets.

In 1934 he won the singles title at the Italian Championships in Milan after winning the final against compatriot Giorgio de Stefani in three straight sets. Partnering George Lyttleton-Rogers, he also won the doubles title against G.P. Hughes and De Stefani. The following year, 1935, when the tournament moved to the Foro Italico in Rome, he again reached the singles final but lost to Wilmer Hines in three sets. Palmieri won the title at the 1935 singles event of Monte-Carlo Championships after a victory in the final against Henry "Bunny" Austin. At Beaulieu and Bordighera, two other tournaments on the Riviera circuit, he was a runner-up in singles, losing the final to Von Cramm and Jean Lesueur respectively. He also won the Bordighera Championship four times (1932, 1934, 1936–1937), and the Alassio International four times (1933–1936).

Palmieri was a member of the Italian Davis Cup team which reached the final of the Europe Zone in 1932, and he compiled a playing record of five wins and five losses. He was the Italian national singles champion for five consecutive years from 1932 to 1937.

Palmieri was ranked No. 8 in Europe in 1936 by Heinrich Kleinschroth, a former German champion and Davis Cup player.

=== Professional ===
Palmieri had a brief spell as a professional player when he competed in the London Pro Championships, held in April 1939 at the Olympia Arena. The tournament was played in a round-robin format, and Palmieri finished last, losing all seven of his matches against Henri Cochet, Jan Koželuh, Dan Maskell, Hans Nüsslein, Robert Ramillon, Lester Stoefen and Bill Tilden respectively. Only against Maskell did he manage to win a set.
