= Valentino Taroni =

Italian tennis player

- Country (sports): Italy
- Born: 1915
- Died: 1997 (aged 81–82)
- Plays: Right-handed

Singles

Grand Slam singles results
- French Open: 3R (1934)
- Wimbledon: 1R (1935)

Valentino Taroni (1915–1997) was an Italian tennis player.

Born in 1915, Taroni grew up in the town of Carate Urio on the shores of Lake Como. From a working-class family, Taroni's humble beginnings were a contrast to the top Italian player's of the time, who were largely upper class. In order to pursue the sport he had to receive financial help from a member of a Como tennis club, where he was a ball boy.

Taroni competed for the Italy Davis Cup team between 1933 and 1939, primarily as a doubles specialist. He reached the singles third round of the 1934 French Championships and was Italy's national singles champion in 1937. His career was interrupted by the war and after the conflict he became a tennis coach in Naples.

== See also ==
- List of Italy Davis Cup team representatives
