= Clemente Serventi =

Italian tennis player

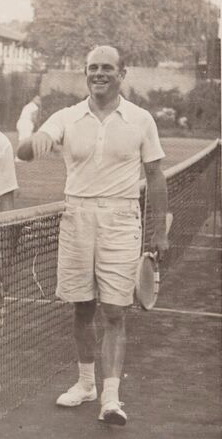

Personal information
- Nationality: Italian
- Born: 7 September 1889; Rome, Kingdom of Italy
- Died: 19 January 1974 (aged 84)

Sport
- Sport: Tennis

Clemente Serventi (7 September 1889 – 19 January 1974) was an Italian tennis player. He competed in the men's singles and doubles events at the 1924 Summer Olympics.
