= Placido Gaslini =

Italian tennis player

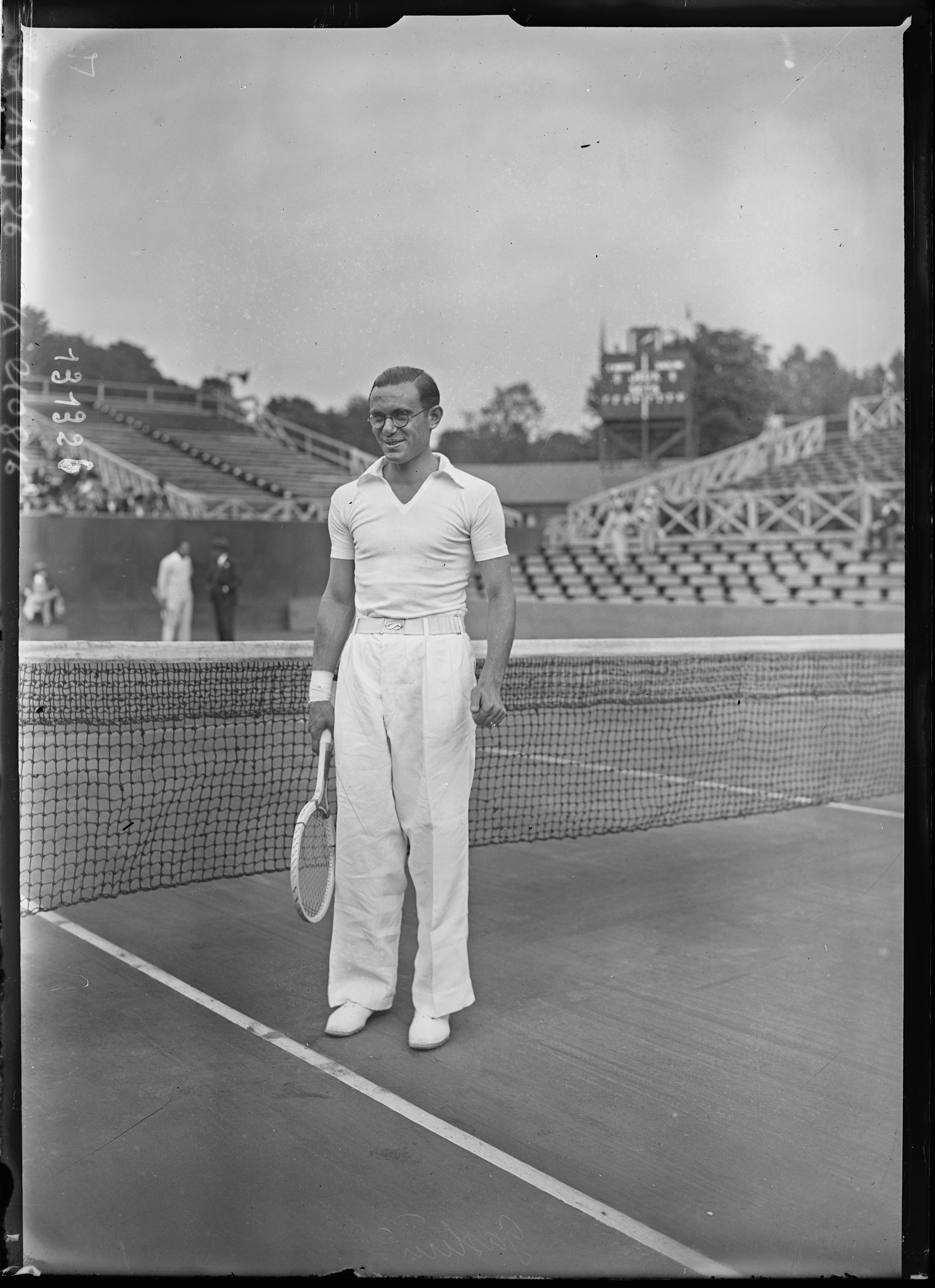
- Country (sports): (Italy)
- Born: Milan, Italy

Singles

Grand Slam singles results
- Wimbledon: 1R (1930)

Other tournaments

Placido Gaslini was a male tennis player from Italy.

== Biography ==
Gaslini, a Milanese lawyer and business man he was son of a banker, was a Davis Cup player and a tennis player, also playing the 1930 Wimbledon tournament.

In 1926 he had a flirtation with the legendary tennis player Suzanne Lenglen.

== See also ==
- Italy Davis Cup team
