= Cesare Colombo =

Italian tennis player

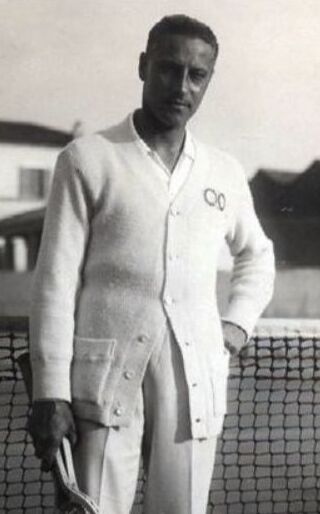

Personal information
- Nationality: Italian
- Born: 1889; La Spezia, Italy
- Died: 1945 (aged 55–56)

Sport
- Sport: Tennis

Cesare Colombo (1889–1945) was an Italian tennis player. He competed in the men's singles and doubles events at the 1920 Summer Olympics.
