= Einer Ulrich =

Danish tennis player (1896–1969)

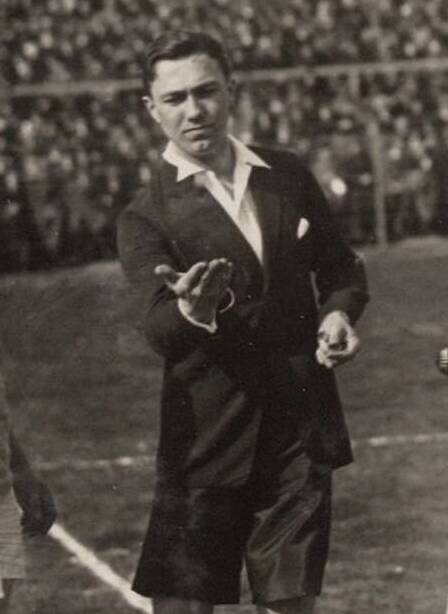
- Ulrich as a football referee in 1923
- Country (sports): Denmark
- Born: 6 May 1896 Copenhagen, Denmark
- Died: 28 February 1969 (aged 72) Gentofte, Denmark

Grand Slam singles results
- Wimbledon: 4R (1926)

Other tournaments
- Olympic Games: 2R (1924)

Grand Slam doubles results
- Wimbledon: 2R (1926, 1929)

Other doubles tournaments
- Olympic Games: 3R (1924)

Grand Slam mixed doubles results
- Wimbledon: 2R (1926, 1929)

Einer Ulrich (Danish: [ˈɑjˀnɐ ˈulˀʁek]; 6 May 1896 – 28 February 1969) was a Danish tennis player who represented Denmark in the Davis Cup and the Olympic Games. He competed in the singles event at the 1924 Summer Olympics, reaching the second round in which he lost to Henk Timmer. With compatriot Erik Tegner he competed in the men's doubles event and reached the third round.

== Early life and family ==
Einer was born in 1896 in Copenhagen to Ellen Margrethe (née Wiegell) and Aage Louis Francis Ulrich. He graduated in 1915 from the Schneekloths school. Then he was drafted into the Jydske Dragonregiment and was mobilized during World War I and was promoted to officer rank.

== Tennis career ==
He competed in the 1926 Wimbledon Championships and reached the fourth round in the singles event in which he lost to Jean Borotra. In the doubles and mixed doubles event he was eliminated in the second round. His second and final participation was at the 1929 Wimbledon Championships in which he reached the second round in all three events. He was a 28-times national champion of Denmark, five of which were consecutive singles victories. He played for the Davis Cup 74 times.

== Football career ==
Ulrich started playing football at Akademisk Boldklub of Copenhagen and later in Kjøbenhavns Boldklub. After retiring, he served as a football referee for 25 more years.

== Personal life ==
Ulrich got involved in the advertising industry when he established his company Einer Ulrich Advertising in 1941, followed by Ulrich and Parrilds Advertising, which he sold to American James Walter Thompson, and he remained as a co-director of the Danish department until his death. He kept in touch with tennis as a chairman of the Hellerup Idræts Klub from 1938 and secretary of the Danish Lawn Tennis Association from 1929 and its president from 1964. He was also the editor-in-chief for the magazine Tennis. For a short time he was appointed the Denmark Davis Cup team captain. In 1967, the Einer Ulrich foundation was formed, a project with the goal to help young tennis players.

Ulrich married three times and had four children: a daughter named Kirsten from his first marriage with Karen Rigmor Larsen, a son (outside marriage with Tyra Liser) named Arne Erlandsen (1917 - 1988) and two sons with his second wife Ulla Meyer, also a tennis player and Danish champion. Their sons, Jørgen Ulrich and Torben Ulrich, became tennis players as well and were Davis Cup representatives. He married the third time to Rigmor Alvilda Landgreen. Einer Ulrich was also the grandfather of Metallica drummer Lars Ulrich, Torben's son.

=== During World War II ===
After the Nazi occupation of Denmark in 1940 the family decided to stay in the country despite the Jewish origin of Ulrich's then-wife Ulla. The turning point was the year 1943 when they were informed of the Nazis' intent to "purge" the Danish protectorate as well. This rumor was strengthened by the deportation of the Danish police in 1943. In October the same year to prevent being arrested Einer used his ties to the Swedish King King Gustav V, a recurring sparring and doubles tennis partner of his, to send his wife and two sons to Sweden in secret. His family along with a group of other Jewish refugees were transported on a fishing boat by human traffickers across the Øresund strait when they were caught on the sea by the Germans. Shots were fired, the passengers jumped into the water and scattered. They were pulled aboard by the Nazis and taken into custody in Elsinore and then to a local camp. Einer made his way there, cleared up the situation with the German authorities, and convinced them to free his family. About six weeks later they decided to give the escape a second chance and this time they made it to Sweden with the help of probably-bribed customs officers. Einer joined them some time later with the help of tennis player Marcus Wallenberg Jr. of Sweden. After the war they moved back to Denmark.

== See also ==
- List of Denmark Davis Cup team representatives

== Sources ==
=== Primary ===
- Cedergreen Bech, Svend, ed. (1979–1984). Einer Ulrich (in Danish). Dansk Biografisk Leksikon.

=== Secondary ===
- Chirazi, Steffan (June 2005). "The Conversation" (PDF). So What!. The Metallica Club: 4–11. Archived from the original (PDF) on 14 October 2007.
