= Uberto De Morpurgo =

Italian tennis player (1896–1961)

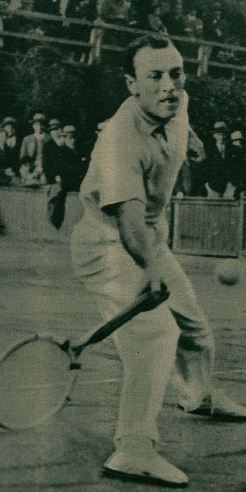
- Uberto De Morpurgo playing Tennis
- Full name: Hubert Louis (Uberto Luigi) De Morpurgo
- Country (sports): Austria-Hungary (−1920); Italy (1920–)
- Born: 11 January 1896 Trieste, Austria-Hungary
- Died: 26 February 1961 (aged 65) Geneva, Switzerland
- Turned pro: 1914 (amateur tour)
- Retired: 1939
- Plays: Right-handed (1-handed backhand)

Singles
- Highest ranking: No. 8 (1930, A. Wallis Myers)

Grand Slam singles results
- French Open: SF (1930)
- Wimbledon: QF (1928)

Other tournaments
- WHCC: 3R (1921, 1923)
- WCCC: SF (1922)

Grand Slam mixed doubles results
- Wimbledon: F (1925)
Medal record
Olympic Games
Bronze medal – third place	1924 Paris	Singles tennis

Uberto De Morpurgo (11 January 1896 – 26 February 1961) was an Italian tennis player.

Uberto De Morpurgo was born in Trieste when it was part of Austria, but became an Italian citizen when the city changed after World War I. His world rankings were ninth in 1928, tenth in 1929, and eighth in 1930. Bill Tilden ranked him 10th in the world in 1924, and 6th in 1929.

== Tennis career ==
De Morpurgo was junior champion in Great Britain in 1911 and student champion in Paris in 1915. He was ranked as Italy's top tennis player in 1927 and again in 1929 through 1931. Tennis magazine called him "the Tilden of his country". De Morpurgo reached the semifinals of the 1930 French championships, losing to Henri Cochet).

He was named Italian Commissioner of Tennis by Benito Mussolini in 1929.

=== Olympics ===
De Morpurgo participated in the singles event at the 1924 Summer Olympics in Paris. He won his first four matches to reach the semifinals, losing to eventual gold medal winner Vincent Richards. De Morpurgo won the bronze medal in a five-set victory against Jean Borotra of France.

=== Davis Cup ===
De Morpurgo played on Italy's Davis Cup team each year from its inaugural year in 1922 through 1933. He won 39 singles matches and lost 14, and in doubles, he was 16–10.

=== Playing style ===
De Morpurgo used a very fast serve on his first ball and an exaggerated American Twist serve on the second serve which was of extreme contortion. His baseline game consisted of flat drives. He had an excellent net attack, owing to his great reach. His overhead, like his service, was hard but erratic.

=== Recognition ===
De Morpurgo, who was Jewish, was inducted as a member of the International Jewish Sports Hall of Fame in 1993.

== Grand Slam finals ==
=== Mixed doubles (1 runners-up) ===
Result	Year	Championship	Surface	Partner	Opponents	Score
Loss	1925	Wimbledon	Grass	(United States) Elizabeth Ryan	(France) Suzanne Lenglen (France) Jean Borotra	3–6, 3–6

== Career finals ==
=== Singles (1 win 2 runner-ups) ===
Result	No.	Date	Tournament	Surface	Opponent	Score
Win	1.	1928	Genoa International, Genoa	Clay	(Italy) Emanuele Sertorio	6–2, 8–6, 6–1
Loss	2.	1929	Monte Carlo Championships, Monaco	Clay	(France) Henri Cochet	6–8, 4–6, 4–6
Loss	3.	1930	Italian Championships, Rome	Clay	(United States) Bill Tilden	1–6, 1–6, 1–6

== See also ==
- List of select Jewish tennis players
- Morpurgo
