= 1933 Wimbledon Championships – Mixed doubles =

Mixed doubles
- 1933 Wimbledon Championships

Final
- Champions: (Germany) Gottfried von Cramm (Germany) Hilde Krahwinkel
- Runners-up: (South Africa) Norman Farquharson (United Kingdom) Mary Heeley
- Score: 7–5, 8–6

Details
- Draw: 80 (5Q)
- Seeds: 4

Events
Singles	men	women		boys	girls
Doubles	men	women	mixed	boys	girls
- Wimbledon Championships

Enrique Maier and Elizabeth Ryan were the defending champions, but lost in the quarterfinals to Gottfried von Cramm and Hilde Krahwinkel.

Von Cramm and Krahwinkel defeated Norman Farquharson and Mary Heeley in the final, 7–5, 8–6 to win the mixed doubles tennis title at the 1933 Wimbledon Championships.

== Seeds ==
1. (Spain) Enrique Maier / (United States) Elizabeth Ryan (quarterfinals)
2. (France) Jean Borotra / (United Kingdom) Betty Nuthall (semifinals)
3. (United Kingdom) Pat Hughes / (United States) Helen Moody (quarterfinals)
4. (South Africa) Norman Farquharson / (United Kingdom) Mary Heeley (final)

Click on the seed number of a player to go to their draw section.

== Draw ==
Key

- Q = Qualifier
- WC = Wild card
- LL = Lucky loser
- Alt = Alternate
- ITF = ITF entry
- PR = Protected ranking
- SR = Special ranking
- SE = Special exempt
- JE = Junior exempt
- JR = Junior Accelerator Programme entrant
- CO = College Accelerator Programme entrant
- NG = Next Gen Accelerator Program entrant
- w/o = Walkover
- r = Retired
- d = Defaulted

=== Finals ===
Quarterfinals
2	(France) Jean Borotra (United Kingdom) Betty Nuthall	10	2	6
(South Africa) Vernon Kirby (Belgium) Josane Sigart	8	6	3
4	(South Africa) Norman Farquharson (United Kingdom) Mary Heeley	10	6
(Japan) Ryuki Miki (United Kingdom) Dorothy Round	8	3
(United Kingdom) Charles Kingsley (United Kingdom) Kitty Godfree	6	6
3	(United Kingdom) Pat Hughes (United States) Helen Moody	4	4
(Germany) Gottfried von Cramm (Germany) Hilde Krahwinkel	6	7
1	(Spain) Enrique Maier (United States) Elizabeth Ryan	1	5

Semifinals
2	(France) Jean Borotra (United Kingdom) Betty Nuthall	6	9
4	(South Africa) Norman Farquharson (United Kingdom) Mary Heeley	8	11
(United Kingdom) Charles Kingsley (United Kingdom) Kitty Godfree	3	6
(Germany) Gottfried von Cramm (Germany) Hilde Krahwinkel	6	8

Final
4	(South Africa) Norman Farquharson (United Kingdom) Mary Heeley	5	6
(Germany) Gottfried von Cramm (Germany) Hilde Krahwinkel	7	8

=== Top half ===
==== Section 1 ====
First round

Second round
2	(France) Jean Borotra (United Kingdom) Betty Nuthall	6	6
Q	(United Kingdom) Norman Latchford (United Kingdom) Sybil Edwards	2	3
(Switzerland) Hector Fisher (Switzerland) Lolette Payot	6	6
Q	(United Kingdom) Adam Hulton; Mrs G Hawkins	0	2
(United Kingdom) Guy Cooper (United Kingdom) Evelyn Dearman	6	6
(United Kingdom) Bob Tinkler (United Kingdom) Peggy Michell	2	2
(Germany) Kay Lund (Germany) Marie Horn	6	3	2
(New Zealand) James Giesen (Australia) Margaret Wilson	4	6	6

Third round
2	(France) J Borotra (United Kingdom) B Nuthall	6	6
(Switzerland) H Fisher (Switzerland) L Payot	4	1
(United Kingdom) G Cooper (United Kingdom) E Dearman	6	6
(New Zealand) J Giesen (Australia) M Wilson	2	3

Fourth round
2	(France) J Borotra (United Kingdom) B Nuthall	6	6
(United Kingdom) G Cooper (United Kingdom) E Dearman	4	4

The nationality of Mrs G Hawkins is unknown.

==== Section 2 ====
First round

Second round
Q	(United Kingdom) Henry Billington (United Kingdom) Mary Knapp	6	6
(United Kingdom) Raymond Tuckey (United Kingdom) Peggy Scriven	4	2
(Japan) Iwao Aoki (United Kingdom) Beatrice Feltham	6	3	8
(Australia) Vivian McGrath (United Kingdom) Phyllis Covell	1	6	6
(South Africa) Vernon Kirby (Belgium) Josane Sigart	6	6
(United Kingdom) Freddie Della Porta (United Kingdom) Nora Martin	3	3
(United Kingdom) Colin Gregory (United Kingdom) MA Thomas	6	6
Q	RG de Quetteville; Mrs HW Backhouse	1	3

Third round
Q	(United Kingdom) H Billington (United Kingdom) M Knapp	2	4
(Japan) I Aoki (United Kingdom) B Feltham	6	6
(South Africa) V Kirby (Belgium) J Sigart	6	5	6
(United Kingdom) C Gregory (United Kingdom) MA Thomas	2	7	3

Fourth round
(Japan) I Aoki (United Kingdom) B Feltham	3	6	2
(South Africa) V Kirby (Belgium) J Sigart	6	2	6

The nationalities of RG de Quetteville and Mrs HW Backhouse are unknown.

==== Section 3 ====
First round

Second round
4	(South Africa) Norman Farquharson (United Kingdom) Mary Heeley	6	6
(United Kingdom) Alfred Ingram (United Kingdom) Peggy Pleydell-Bouverie	3	1
(United Kingdom) Wilfred Freeman (United Kingdom) Mildred Nonweiler	3	5
(United Kingdom) Harry Lee (United Kingdom) Freda James	6	7
(Australia) Jack Crawford (Australia) Marjorie Crawford	w/o
(United Kingdom) Colin Ritchie (United Kingdom) Phoebe Watson
(France) Henri Cochet (United Kingdom) Eileen Fearnley-Whittingstall	6	6
(United Kingdom) Dickie Ritchie (United Kingdom) Ermyntrude Harvey	4	4

Third round
4	(South Africa) N Farquharson (United Kingdom) M Heeley	9	6
(United Kingdom) H Lee (United Kingdom) W James	7	4
(United Kingdom) C Ritchie (United Kingdom) P Watson	6	1
(France) H Cochet (United Kingdom) E Fearnley-Whittingstall	8	6

Fourth round
4	(South Africa) N Farquharson (United Kingdom) M Heeley	4	10	6
(France) H Cochet (United Kingdom) E Fearnley-Whittingstall	6	8	4

==== Section 4 ====
First round
(United Kingdom) Donald Greig (United Kingdom) Mie Johnstone	w/o
(Japan) Ryuki Miki (United Kingdom) Dorothy Round
(New Zealand) Buster Andrews (United Kingdom) Kay Stammers	6	6
(United Kingdom) Peter Graves (United Kingdom) JF Harry	2	1
GE Bean (United Kingdom) CJ Tyrrell	9	7	2
(France) Marcel Bernard (France) Sylvie Henrotin	11	5	6
(France) André Martin-Legeay (France) Jacqueline Gallay	3	6	3
(United Kingdom) Patrick Wheatley (United Kingdom) Nancy Lyle	6	2	6
(Belgium) André Lacroix (United Kingdom) Helen Dyson	5	6
(United Kingdom) John Olliff (United Kingdom) Dorothy Shepherd-Barron	7	8
(Australia) Adrian Quist (United Kingdom) Elsie Pittman	6	6
(Belgium) Léopold de Borman (Belgium) Nelly Adamson	0	2
(Australia) Don Turnbull (United States) Helen Jacobs	6	6
(Soviet Union) Sergei Rodzianko (Spain) Bella Pons	1	3
(United Kingdom) Brian Gilbert (United Kingdom) Evelyn Goldsworth	6	4	3
(Denmark) Anker Jacobsen (United Kingdom) Mary Burgess-Smith	3	6	6

Second round
(Japan) T Miki (United Kingdom) D Round	2	6	6
(New Zealand) E Andrews (United Kingdom) K Stammers	6	2	2
(France) M Bernard (France) S Henrotin	6	5	6
(United Kingdom) P Wheatley (United Kingdom) N Lyle	3	7	4
(United Kingdom) J Olliff (United Kingdom) D Shepherd-Barron	9	6	9
(Australia) A Quist (United Kingdom) E Pittman	11	4	7
(Australia) D Turnbull (United States) H Jacobs	4	6	6
(Denmark) A Jacobsen (United Kingdom) M Burgess-Smith	6	4	3

Third round
(Japan) T Miki (United Kingdom) D Round	3	8	6
(France) M Bernard (France) S Henrotin	6	6	2
(Australia) A Quist (United Kingdom) E Pittman	4	6	4
(Australia) D Turnbull (United States) H Jacobs	6	4	6

Fourth round
(Japan) T Miki (United Kingdom) D Round	6	1	6
(Australia) D Turnbull (United States) H Jacobs	1	6	2

The nationality of GE Bean is unknown.

=== Bottom half ===
==== Section 5 ====
First round
Q	(United Kingdom) JH Booth (United Kingdom) M Wynne	11	4
(Japan) Eikishi Ito (United Kingdom) Mary Hardwick	13	6
(Denmark) Ernst Asmussen (United Kingdom) JE Stevens	2	1
(United Kingdom) David Williams (United Kingdom) Naomi Trentham	6	6
(France) Antoine Gentien (Greece) Helene Nicolopoulos	6	7
(Hungary) Béla von Kehrling (United States) Dorothy Burke	4	5
(South Africa) Jack Condon (United Kingdom) Joan Ridley	6	8
(United Kingdom) Eric Peters (United Kingdom) Effie Peters	0	6
(United Kingdom) Donald MacPhail (United Kingdom) Winnie Mason	3	0
(United Kingdom) Frank Wilde (United Kingdom) Phyllis King	6	6
(Germany) Daniel Prenn (United Kingdom) Elsa Haylock	w/o
(United Kingdom) Arthur Vinall (United Kingdom) Violet Owen
(United Kingdom) Charles Kingsley (United Kingdom) Kitty Godfree	6	6
(France) André Merlin (France) Lucette Caron Culbert	2	1
(United Kingdom) Pat Sherwood (United Kingdom) Margaret Mellows	2	6
(France) Christian Boussus (France) Colette Rosambert	6	8

Second round
(Japan) E Ito (United Kingdom) M Hardwick	6	6
(United Kingdom) D Williams (United Kingdom) N Trentham	4	4
(France) A Gentien (Greece) H Nicolopoulos	4	6	3
(South Africa) J Condon (United Kingdom) J Ridley	6	3	6
(United Kingdom) F Wilde (United Kingdom) P King	6	6
(United Kingdom) A Vinall (United Kingdom) V Owen	1	2
(United Kingdom) C Kingsley (United Kingdom) K Godfree	5	6	6
(France) C Boussus (France) C Rosambert	7	0	3

Third round
(Japan) E Ito (United Kingdom) M Hardwick	5	3
(South Africa) J Condon (United Kingdom) J Ridley	7	6
(United Kingdom) F Wilde (United Kingdom) P King	6	3	3
(United Kingdom) C Kingsley (United Kingdom) K Godfree	3	6	6

Fourth round
(South Africa) J Condon (United Kingdom) J Ridley	1	4
(United Kingdom) C Kingsley (United Kingdom) K Godfree	6	6

==== Section 6 ====
First round

Second round
(Italy) Emanuele Sertorio (United Kingdom) Madge Slaney	2	3
(Netherlands) Hendrik Timmer (Netherlands) Madzy Couquerque	6	6
(South Africa) Colin Robbins (United Kingdom) Joan Ingram	7	6
(Germany) Eberhard Nourney (Germany) Marga von Ende-Pflügner	5	4
(United Kingdom) Billy Collins (United Kingdom) Olga Webb
(Austria) Franz Matejka (Poland) Jadwiga Jędrzejowska	w/o
(United Kingdom) Ted Avory (United Kingdom) Joan Strawson	2	3
3	(United Kingdom) Pat Hughes (United States) Helen Moody	6	6

Third round
(Netherlands) H Timmer (Netherlands) M Couquerque	7	4	6
(South Africa) C Robbins (United Kingdom) J Ingram	5	6	2
(United Kingdom) W Collins (United Kingdom) O Webb	1	4
3	(United Kingdom) P Hughes (United States) H Moody	6	6

Fourth round
(Netherlands) H Timmer (Netherlands) M Couquerque	4	3
3	(United Kingdom) P Hughes (United States) H Moody	6	6

==== Section 7 ====
First round

Second round
(Germany) Gottfried von Cramm (Germany) Hilde Krahwinkel	6	6
(France) Jacques Brugnon (France) Simonne Mathieu	1	4
(Italy) Alberto del Bono (United Kingdom) Phyllis Satterthwaite	6	2	2
(France) Roland Journu (France) Jacqueline Goldschmidt	4	6	6
(Egypt) Pierre Grandguillot (France) Elizabeth Macready	6	2	6
(United Kingdom) Laddie Wheatcroft (United Kingdom) Christabel Wheatcroft	4	6	4
(United Kingdom) Herman David (United Kingdom) Billie Yorke	6	7	6
(United States) Teddy Burwell (United Kingdom) Margaret Stocks	4	9	2

Third round
(Germany) G von Cramm (Germany) H Krahwinkel	6	6
(France) R Journu (France) J Goldschmidt	3	2
(Egypt) P Grandguillot (France) E Macready	1	6	10
(United Kingdom) H David (United Kingdom) A Yorke	6	4	12

Fourth round
(Germany) G von Cramm (Germany) H Krahwinkel	6	6
(United Kingdom) H David (United Kingdom) A Yorke	3	4

==== Section 8 ====
First round

Second round
(United Kingdom) Douglas Hodges (United Kingdom) Marjorie Stork	6	3	2
(New Zealand) Alan Stedman (United States) Virginia Rice	4	6	6
(Japan) Ryosuke Nunoi (United Kingdom) Susan Noel	6	6	6
(United States) David Jones (Italy) Lucia Valerio	8	3	1
(United Kingdom) Philip Glover (United Kingdom) Betty Uber	6	7	3
(United Kingdom) Bobby Meredith (United Kingdom) Ruth Kirk	4	9	6
(South Africa) Gerald Sherwell (United Kingdom) Patricia Brazier	1	4
1	(Spain) Enrique Maier (United States) Elizabeth Ryan	6	6

Third round
(New Zealand) A Stedman (United States) V Rice	2	1
(Japan) R Nunoi (United Kingdom) S Noel	6	6
(United Kingdom) G Meredith (United Kingdom) R Kirk	2	2
1	(Spain) E Maier (United States) E Ryan	6	6

Fourth round
(Japan) R Nunoi (United Kingdom) S Noel	2	6
1	(Spain) E Maier (United States) E Ryan	6	8
