= 1933 Wimbledon Championships – Men's doubles =

Men's doubles
- 1933 Wimbledon Championships

Final
- Champions: (France) Jean Borotra (France) Jacques Brugnon
- Runners-up: (Japan) Ryosuke Nunoi (Japan) Jiro Sato
- Score: 4–6, 6–3, 6–3, 7–5

Details
- Draw: 64 (5Q)
- Seeds: 4

Events
Singles	men	women		boys	girls
Doubles	men	women	mixed	boys	girls
- Wimbledon Championships

Jean Borotra and Jacques Brugnon successfully defended their title, defeating Ryosuke Nunoi and Jiro Sato in the final, 4–6, 6–3, 6–3, 7–5 to win the gentlemen's doubles tennis title at the 1933 Wimbledon Championship.

== Seeds ==
1. (France) Jean Borotra / (France) Jacques Brugnon (champions)
2. (United States) Keith Gledhill / (United States) Ellsworth Vines (first round)
3. (United Kingdom) Pat Hughes / (United Kingdom) Fred Perry (quarterfinals)
4. (South Africa) Norman Farquharson / (South Africa) Vernon Kirby (semifinals)

Click on the seed number of a player to go to their draw section.

== Draw ==
Key

- Q = Qualifier
- WC = Wild card
- LL = Lucky loser
- Alt = Alternate
- ITF = ITF entry
- PR = Protected ranking
- SR = Special ranking
- SE = Special exempt
- JE = Junior exempt
- JR = Junior Accelerator Programme entrant
- CO = College Accelerator Programme entrant
- NG = Next Gen Accelerator Program entrant
- w/o = Walkover
- r = Retired
- d = Defaulted

=== Finals ===
Quarterfinals
(New Zealand) Buster Andrews (New Zealand) Alan Stedman	6	5	7	2
(Germany) Gottfried von Cramm (Germany) Eberhard Nourney	3	7	9	2
3	(United Kingdom) Pat Hughes (United Kingdom) Fred Perry	7	3	4	6	3
(Japan) Ryosuke Nunoi (Japan) Jiro Sato	5	6	6	1	6
(United Kingdom) John Olliff (United Kingdom) Laddie Wheatcroft	2	3	7
4	(South Africa) Norman Farquharson (South Africa) Vernon Kirby	6	6	7
(Australia) Jack Crawford (Australia) Vivian McGrath	2	2	6	2
1	(France) Jean Borotra (France) Jacques Brugnon	6	6	3	6

Semifinals
(Germany) Gottfried von Cramm (Germany) Eberhard Nourney	5	6	4	1
(Japan) Ryosuke Nunoi (Japan) Jiro Sato	7	3	6	6
4	(South Africa) Norman Farquharson (South Africa) Vernon Kirby	7	6	4	3	4
1	(France) Jean Borotra (France) Jacques Brugnon	5	3	6	6	6

Final
(Japan) Ryosuke Nunoi (Japan) Jiro Sato	6	3	3	5
1	(France) Jean Borotra (France) Jacques Brugnon	4	6	6	7

=== Top half ===
==== Section 1 ====
First round
2	(United States) Keith Gledhill (United States) Ellsworth Vines	6	7	2	4	2
(Australia) Adrian Quist (Australia) Don Turnbull	4	5	6	6	6
Q	(United Kingdom) Malcolm Russell (United Kingdom) Pat Sherwood	6	4	10	4	5
(United Kingdom) Ted Avory (United Kingdom) Dickie Ritchie	3	6	8	6	7
(United Kingdom) Douglas Hodges (United Kingdom) Colin Ritchie	6	3	6	7
(France) Roland Journu (France) André Martin-Legeay	1	6	3	5
(New Zealand) Buster Andrews (New Zealand) Alan Stedman	3	6	6	8
(United Kingdom) Claude Metcalf (United Kingdom) Arthur Vinall	6	2	2	6
(United Kingdom) Lovat Barclay (United Kingdom) RC Wackett	6	3	7	2
(Italy) Alberto del Bono (Italy) Emanuele Sertorio	3	6	9	6
(United Kingdom) Eric Attewell (United Kingdom) Bobby Meredith	2	7	3
(Czechoslovakia) Ladislav Hecht (Czechoslovakia) Josef Maleček	6	9	6
(United Kingdom) Gerald King (United Kingdom) Jack Lysaght	2	4	6	0
(United States) Bill Breese (Australia) Bill Ryan	6	6	3	6
(United Kingdom) Henry Burrows (Soviet Union) Sergei Rodzianko	3	11	2
(Germany) Gottfried von Cramm (Germany) Eberhard Nourney	6	13	6

Second round
(Australia) A Quist (Australia) D Turnbull	2	6	6	7
(United Kingdom) E Avory (United Kingdom) R Ritchie	6	3	4	5
(United Kingdom) D Hodges (United Kingdom) C Ritchie	5	6	4
(New Zealand) E Andrews (New Zealand) A Stedman	7	8	6
(Italy) A del Bono (Italy) E Sertorio	2	7	6	6	6
(Czechoslovakia) L Hecht (Czechoslovakia) J Maleček	6	9	4	4	4
(United States) W Breese (Australia) W Ryan	3	2	4
(Germany) G von Cramm (Germany) E Nourney	6	6	6

Third round
(Australia) AK Quist (Australia) DP Turnbull	6	5	6	2	4
(New Zealand) E Andrews (New Zealand) A Stedman	4	7	3	6	6
(Italy) A del Bono (Italy) E Sertorio	6	3	4	4
(Germany) G von Cramm (Germany) E Nourney	1	6	6	6

Quarterfinals
(New Zealand) E Andrews (New Zealand) A Stedman	6	5	7	2
(Germany) G von Cramm (Germany) E Nourney	3	7	9	2

==== Section 2 ====
First round
3	(United Kingdom) Pat Hughes (United Kingdom) Fred Perry	7	6	6
(United Kingdom) Roy Ashby (United Kingdom) James Babbington	5	3	4
Q	(United Kingdom) Herbert Aldred (United Kingdom) Einar Caroe	7	5	3	6	1
(United Kingdom) Norman Latchford (United Kingdom) William Powell	5	7	6	4	6
(France) Christian Boussus (France) Antoine Gentien	4	6	6	6
(United Kingdom) Harvey Hillier (United Kingdom) David Williams	6	1	1	3
(United Kingdom) Billy Collins (United Kingdom) Edward Dearman	9	6	6
(United Kingdom) Donald Greig (United Kingdom) Teddy Higgs	7	2	2
(Japan) Ryosuke Nunoi (Japan) Jiro Sato	6	6	6
(Hungary) Béla von Kehrling (Spain) Enrique Maier	3	4	4
(United Kingdom) Alan Brown (South Africa) Gerald Sherwell	2	1	6
(South Africa) Jack Condon (South Africa) Colin Robbins	6	6	8
(United Kingdom) George Gibbs (United Kingdom) Bill Latham	6	2	10	7
(United Kingdom) Jock Findlay (United Kingdom) Lewis Michell	1	6	8	5
(India) Athar-Ali Fyzee (India) Hassan Ali Fyzee	6	7	4	1	2
(United Kingdom) Brian Gilbert (Czechoslovakia) Josef Šíba	3	5	6	6	6

Second round
3	(United Kingdom) P Hughes (United Kingdom) F Perry	6	6	8
(United Kingdom) N Latchford (United Kingdom) W Powell	3	1	6
(France) C Boussus (France) A Gentien	6	6	6
(United Kingdom) W Collins (United Kingdom) E Dearman	2	1	2
(Japan) R Nunoi (Japan) J Sato	6	5	6	6
(South Africa) J Condon (South Africa) C Robbins	1	7	1	2
(United Kingdom) G Gibbs (United Kingdom) W Latham	6	11	6
(United Kingdom) B Gilbert (Czechoslovakia) J Šíba	3	9	2

Third round
3	(United Kingdom) P Hughes (United Kingdom) F Perry	6	9	6	4	6
(France) C Boussus (France) A Gentien	2	11	3	6	4
(Japan) R Nunoi (Japan) J Sato	6	6	6
(United Kingdom) G Gibbs (United Kingdom) W Latham	3	1	1

Quarterfinals
3	(United Kingdom) P Hughes (United Kingdom) F Perry	7	3	4	6	3
(Japan) R Nunoi (Japan) J Sato	5	6	6	1	6

=== Bottom half ===
==== Section 3 ====
First round
(Belgium) Léopold de Borman (Belgium) André Lacroix	6	6	6
(United Kingdom) Brian Finnigan (New Zealand) James Giesen	4	1	3
(United States) Lester Stoefen (United States) Cliff Sutter	6	2	9	6
(France) Marcel Bernard (France) André Merlin	3	6	7	4
(United Kingdom) Herman David (United Kingdom) Eric Peters	6	6	6
(United Kingdom) Victor Cazalet (United Kingdom) RG Stone	2	2	2
(United Kingdom) Freddie Della Porta (United Kingdom) Harold Gunn	4	7	0
(United Kingdom) John Olliff (United Kingdom) Laddie Wheatcroft	6	9	6
(Japan) Iwao Aoki (United Kingdom) Gwyn Tuckett	3	6	6	6
Q	(United Kingdom) Wilfred Freeman (Netherlands) DP van Meurs	6	4	1	2
(United Kingdom) Peter Graves (United Kingdom) Desmond Morris	6	4	6	3	4
(Argentina) Francisco Bryans (United Kingdom) John Leader	2	6	2	6	6
Q	(United Kingdom) Leighton Crawford (United Kingdom) Jimmy Hunt	3	5	4
(Switzerland) Hector Fisher (Netherlands) Hendrik Timmer	6	7	6
(United Kingdom) Guy Cooper (United Kingdom) Patrick Wheatley	3	3	6	3
4	(South Africa) Norman Farquharson (South Africa) Vernon Kirby	6	6	4	6

Second round
(Belgium) L de Borman (Belgium) A Lacroix	3	4	7
(United States) L Stoefen (United States) C Sutter	6	6	9
(United Kingdom) H David (United Kingdom) E Peters	6	6	3	4	2
(United Kingdom) J Olliff (United Kingdom) I Wheatcroft	3	4	6	6	6
(Japan) I Aoki (United Kingdom) G Tuckett	6	6	1	6
(Argentina) F Bryans (United Kingdom) J Leader	4	2	6	3
(Switzerland) H Fisher (Netherlands) H Timmer	2	1	4
4	(South Africa) N Farquharson (South Africa) V Kirby	6	6	6

Third round
(United States) L Stoefen (United States) C Sutter	7	6	5	9	6
(United Kingdom) J Olliff (United Kingdom) I Wheatcroft	5	2	7	11	8
(Japan) I Aoki (United Kingdom) G Tuckett	2	3	4
4	(South Africa) N Farquharson (South Africa) V Kirby	6	6	6

Quarterfinals
(United Kingdom) J Olliff (United Kingdom) I Wheatcroft	2	3	7
4	(South Africa) N Farquharson (South Africa) V Kirby	6	6	7

==== Section 4 ====
First round
Q	M Benavitch (British Ceylon) Frederick de Saram	11	3	2
(United Kingdom) Cyril Fletcher (United Kingdom) John Fletcher	13	6	6
(United Kingdom) Philip Glover (United Kingdom) Harry Lewis-Barclay	6	6	3	3	4
(Germany) Heinrich Kleinschroth (Germany) Kay Lund	3	4	6	6	6
(United Kingdom) Colin Gregory (United Kingdom) Frank Wilde	6	6	8	6
(Japan) Eikishi Ito (Japan) Ryuki Miki	2	0	10	1
(Republic of Ireland) Harry Cronin (Republic of Ireland) Henry Purcell	2	3	3
(Australia) Jack Crawford (Australia) Vivian McGrath	6	6	6
(Austria) Adam Baworowski (Austria) Harry Kinzl	8	0	2
(Egypt) Pierre Grandguillot (Germany) Daniel Prenn	10	6	6
(Denmark) Ernst Asmussen (Denmark) Anker Jacobsen	3	4	11
(United States) Teddy Burwell (United States) David Jones	6	6	13
(United Kingdom) Charles Kingsley (United Kingdom) Bob Tinkler	6	5	6	6	4
(South Africa) Pat Spence (United Kingdom) Raymond Tuckey	8	7	2	3	6
(United Kingdom) Harry Lee (United Kingdom) Keats Lester	5	2	4
1	(France) Jean Borotra (France) Jacques Brugnon	7	6	6

Second round
(United Kingdom) C Fletcher (United Kingdom) J Fletcher	6	7	1	6
(Germany) H Kleinschroth (Germany) K Lund	4	5	6	4
(United Kingdom) C Gregory (United Kingdom) F Wilde	4	3	7	5
(Australia) J Crawford (Australia) V McGrath	6	6	5	7
(Egypt) P Grandguillot (Germany) D Prenn	6	7	7	5
(United States) T Burwell (United States) D Jones	8	5	9	7
(South Africa) P Spence (United Kingdom) R Tuckey	6	3	3
1	(France) J Borotra (France) J Brugnon	8	6	6

Third round
(United Kingdom) C Fletcher (United Kingdom) J Fletcher	3	2	7
(Australia) J Crawford (Australia) V McGrath	6	6	9
(United States) T Burwell (United States) D Jones	4	6	4	4
1	(France) J Borotra (France) J Brugnon	6	2	6	6

Quarterfinals
(Australia) J Crawford (Australia) V McGrath	2	2	6	2
1	(France) J Borotra (France) J Brugnon	6	6	3	6

The nationality of M Benavitch is unknown.
