= 1933 Wimbledon Championships – Men's singles =

Men's singles
- 1933 Wimbledon Championships

Final
- Champion: (Australia) Jack Crawford
- Runner-up: (United States) Ellsworth Vines
- Score: 4–6, 11–9, 6–2, 2–6, 6–4

Details
- Draw: 128 (10Q)
- Seeds: 8

Events
Singles	men	women		boys	girls
Doubles	men	women	mixed	boys	girls
- Wimbledon Championships

Jack Crawford defeated the defending champion Ellsworth Vines in the final, 4–6, 11–9, 6–2, 2–6, 6–4 to win the gentlemen's singles tennis title at the 1933 Wimbledon Championships.

== Seeds ==
1. (United States) Ellsworth Vines (finalist)
2. (Australia) Jack Crawford (champion)
3. (France) Henri Cochet (semifinals)
4. (United Kingdom) Bunny Austin (quarterfinals)
5. (United States) Cliff Sutter (fourth round)
6. (United Kingdom) Fred Perry (second round)
7. (Japan) Jiro Sato (semifinals)
8. (United Kingdom) Harry Lee (fourth round)

Click on the seed number of a player to go to their draw section.

== Draw ==
Key

- Q = Qualifier
- WC = Wild card
- LL = Lucky loser
- Alt = Alternate
- ITF = ITF entry
- PR = Protected ranking
- SR = Special ranking
- SE = Special exempt
- JE = Junior exempt
- JR = Junior Accelerator Programme entrant
- CO = College Accelerator Programme entrant
- NG = Next Gen Accelerator Program entrant
- w/o = Walkover
- r = Retired
- d = Defaulted

=== Finals ===
Quarterfinals
1	(United States) Ellsworth Vines	6	6	3	6
(Czechoslovakia) Roderich Menzel	2	4	6	3
3	(France) Henri Cochet	3	6	6	6
(United States) Lester Stoefen	6	4	3	1
7	(Japan) Jiro Sato	7	6	2	2	6
4	(United Kingdom) Bunny Austin	5	3	6	6	2
(United Kingdom) Pat Hughes	1	1	5
2	(Australia) Jack Crawford	6	6	7

Semifinals
1	(United States) Ellsworth Vines	6	8	3	6
3	(France) Henri Cochet	2	6	6	1
7	(Japan) Jiro Sato	3	4	6	4
2	(Australia) Jack Crawford	6	6	2	6

Final
1	(United States) Ellsworth Vines	6	9	2	6	4
2	(Australia) Jack Crawford	4	11	6	2	6

=== Top half ===
==== Section 1 ====
First round
1	(United States) Ellsworth Vines	6	6	6
(United Kingdom) Bobby Meredith	1	2	0
(United Kingdom) Oswald Jameson	8	2	6
Q	(United Kingdom) Arnold England	10	6	8
(United Kingdom) Bob Tinkler	9	1	6
(Japan) Ryuki Miki	11	6	8
(United Kingdom) Keats Lester	6	6	4	4
(United States) Bill Breese	3	8	6	6
(Germany) Daniel Prenn	6	6	6
(United Kingdom) Jimmy Jones	4	2	1
(Denmark) Henning Larsen	9	6	2	3
Q	(United Kingdom) EMD Vanderspar	11	3	6	6
(United Kingdom) George Gibbs	1	3	2
(Italy) Emanuele Sertorio	6	6	6
(Australia) Don Turnbull	6	6	6
(United Kingdom) Guy Cooper	2	1	1

Second round
1	(United States) E Vines	6	4	7	6
Q	(United Kingdom) A England	1	6	5	1
(Japan) T Miki	6	6	6
(United States) B Breese	2	2	1
(Germany) D Prenn	6	6	6
Q	(United Kingdom) EMD Vanderspar	0	2	3
(Italy) E Sertorio	3	4	2
(Australia) D Turnbull	6	6	6

Third round
1	(United States) E Vines	6	6	6
(Japan) T Miki	2	4	4
(Germany) D Prenn	7	6	6
(Australia) D Turnbull	5	0	2

Fourth round
1	(United States) E Vines	6	6	6
(Germany) D Prenn	3	2	4

==== Section 2 ====
First round
6	(United Kingdom) Fred Perry	6	6	6
(Belgium) André Lacroix	3	3	2
(South Africa) Norman Farquharson	6	6	6
(United Kingdom) Jimmy Reddall	0	3	2
(United Kingdom) Colin Gregory	10	7	7	3	6
(United Kingdom) Colin Ritchie	8	5	9	6	1
(Czechoslovakia) Roderich Menzel	9	0	6	6
(New Zealand) Buster Andrews	7	6	1	3
(France) Marcel Bernard	6	2	8	3	3
(Republic of Ireland) George Lyttleton-Rogers	2	6	6	6	6
(United Kingdom) Frank Wilde	7	6	7
Q	(United Kingdom) Victor Cazalet	5	3	5
(United Kingdom) Wilfred Freeman	0	6	3	6	7
(United Kingdom) Paul Partridge	6	0	6	3	9
(Germany) Kay Lund	4	6	8	6
(United Kingdom) Eric Peters	6	3	6	2

Second round
6	(United Kingdom) F Perry	5	1	6	6	4
(South Africa) N Farquharson	7	6	3	4	6
(United Kingdom) C Gregory	7	3	4
(Czechoslovakia) R Menzel	9	6	6
(Republic of Ireland) G Lyttleton-Rogers	7	3	5	8	6
(United Kingdom) F Wilde	5	6	7	6	2
(United Kingdom) P Partridge	8	4	3	3
(Germany) K Lund	6	6	6	6

Third round
(South Africa) N Farquharson	3	3	2
(Czechoslovakia) R Menzel	6	6	6
(Republic of Ireland) G Lyttleton-Rogers	6	4	6	1	7
(Germany) K Lund	3	6	3	6	5

Fourth round
(Czechoslovakia) R Menzel	6	6	12
(Republic of Ireland) G Lyttleton-Rogers	1	1	10

==== Section 3 ====
First round
3	(France) Henri Cochet	6	6	6
(United Kingdom) Henry Burrows	2	2	1
Q	(United Kingdom) Gerry France	4	2	2
(United Kingdom) Raymond Tuckey	6	6	6
(Germany) Heinrich Kleinschroth	0	1	2
(United States) Teddy Burwell	6	6	6
(United Kingdom) Pat Sherwood	2	3	3
(Netherlands) Hendrik Timmer	6	6	6
(United Kingdom) Donald MacPhail	0	10	4
(South Africa) Colin Robbins	6	12	6
(United Kingdom) Alan Brown	6	6	7
(Argentina) Francisco Bryans	0	1	5
(United Kingdom) Patrick Wheatley	4	2	6	3
(United States) David Jones	6	6	3	6
Q	(United Kingdom) Henry Weatherall	6	1	6	6
(United Kingdom) Laddie Wheatcroft	1	6	3	4

Second round
3	(France) H Cochet	4	6	6	6
(United Kingdom) R Tuckey	6	2	1	4
(United States) T Burwell	1	7	0
(Netherlands) H Timmer	6	5	0^{r}
(South Africa) C Robbins	6	8	3	2	6
(United Kingdom) A Brown	3	6	6	6	4
(United States) D Jones	9	6	6
Q	(United Kingdom) H Weatherall	7	4	4

Third round
3	(France) H Cochet	2	6	6	5	6
(United States) T Burwell	6	4	3	7	3
(South Africa) C Robbins	5	2	9
(United States) D Jones	7	6	11

Fourth round
3	(France) H Cochet	6	6	8	6
(United States) D Jones	4	8	6	0

==== Section 4 ====
First round
8	(United Kingdom) Harry Lee	6	7	6
Q	(Jamaica) Clinton Nunes	3	5	0
(Switzerland) Hector Fisher	6	6	6
(United Kingdom) Eric Attewell	3	2	4
(Czechoslovakia) Josef Šíba	6	6	6
(Australia) Bill Ryan	4	2	1
(Australia) Vivian McGrath	6	7	6
(United Kingdom) Charles Kingsley	4	5	2
(United Kingdom) William Powell	2	2	6	6	6
(Denmark) Ernst Asmussen	6	6	2	4	1
(Austria) Harry Kinzl	2	0	6
(United Kingdom) Philip Glover	6	6	8
(United Kingdom) Ted Avory	6	8	4	6
(United States) Lester Stoefen	2	10	6	8
(Japan) Ryosuke Nunoi	6	6	6
(New Zealand) James Giesen	2	2	4

Second round
8	(United Kingdom) H Lee	6	6	6	6
(Switzerland) H Fisher	8	3	3	3
(Czechoslovakia) J Šíba	5	3	6	9	5
(Australia) V McGrath	7	6	3	7	7
(United Kingdom) W Powell	6	10	6
(United Kingdom) P Glover	0	8	4
(United States) L Stoefen	9	2	9	1	6
(Japan) R Nunoi	7	6	7	6	2

Third round
8	(United Kingdom) H Lee	6	6	6
(Australia) V McGrath	4	3	1
(United Kingdom) W Powell	2	4	2
(United States) L Stoefen	6	6	6

Fourth round
8	(United Kingdom) H Lee	7	6	5	5	3
(United States) L Stoefen	5	2	7	7	6

=== Bottom half ===
==== Section 5 ====
First round
(United Kingdom) David Williams	10	4	4	6	6
(Germany) Eberhard Nourney	8	6	6	4	1
(United Kingdom) Herman David	0	3	2
(Italy) Giorgio de Stefani	6	6	6
(France) André Merlin	6	6	6
(United Kingdom) Wilfred Smith	3	1	4
(Uruguay) Eduardo Stanham	5	6	3	1
(France) Roland Journu	7	4	6	6
(United Kingdom) Brian Gilbert	3	2	1
(United Kingdom) Jack Lysaght	6	6	6
Q	(United Kingdom) John Shales	10	4	7
(Republic of Ireland) Harry Cronin	12	6	9
(United Kingdom) Stan Harris	6	6	1	10
(South Africa) Jack O'Shea	3	3	6	8
(Monaco) Vladimir Landau	4	2	1
7	(Japan) Jiro Sato	6	6	6

Second round
(United Kingdom) D Williams	2	3	9
(Italy) G de Stefani	6	6	11
(France) A Merlin	6	6	4	6
(France) R Journu	0	0	6	3
(United Kingdom) J Lysaght	6	6	6
(Republic of Ireland) H Cronin	1	0	3
(United Kingdom) S Harris	3	3	5
7	(Japan) J Sato	6	6	7

Third round
(Italy) G de Stefani	6	6	6
(France) A Merlin	4	2	1
(United Kingdom) J Lysaght	6	3	0	2
7	(Japan) J Sato	4	6	6	6

Fourth round
(Italy) G de Stefani	2	4	6	3
7	(Japan) J Sato	6	6	3	6

==== Section 6 ====
First round
Q	(United Kingdom) Ian Bailey	3	2	4
(Denmark) Anker Jacobsen	6	6	6
(Czechoslovakia) Ladislav Hecht	4	3^{r}
(South Africa) Pat Spence	6	5
(United Kingdom) Gwyn Tuckett	3	3	2
(United Kingdom) Teddy Higgs	6	6	6
(United Kingdom) George Godsell	2	4	0
(South Africa) Vernon Kirby	6	6	6
LL	(India) Athar-Ali Fyzee	2	4	4
(Australia) Adrian Quist	6	6	6
(United States) Keith Gledhill
(Austria) Franz Matejka	w/o
(United Kingdom) Brian Finnigan	3	3	4
(France) Jacques Brugnon	6	6	6
(United Kingdom) Billy Collins	1	0	1
4	(United Kingdom) Bunny Austin	6	6	6

Second round
(Denmark) A Jacobsen	6	5	4	4
(South Africa) P Spence	4	7	6	6
(United Kingdom) E Higgs	5	3	6	4
(South Africa) V Kirby	7	6	4	6
(Australia) A Quist	3	7	2
(United States) K Gledhill	6	9	6
(France) J Brugnon	2	6	5	0
4	(United Kingdom) H Austin	6	3	7	6

Third round
(South Africa) P Spence	7	6	4	6	6
(South Africa) V Kirby	9	4	6	4	2
(United States) K Gledhill	3	8	1
4	(United Kingdom) H Austin	6	10	6

Fourth round
(South Africa) P Spence	2	2	4
4	(United Kingdom) H Austin	6	6	6

==== Section 7 ====
First round
(Japan) Iwao Aoki	6	1	6	3
(United Kingdom) James Cummins	3	6	1	0^{r}
(United Kingdom) Peter Graves	0	6	0	2
Q	(United Kingdom) Desmond Morris	6	4	6	6
(United Kingdom) Pat Hughes	6	4	6	6
(Egypt) Pierre Grandguillot	0	6	0	2
(United Kingdom) Dickie Ritchie	6	6	6
(United States) Gordon Jason	3	2	4
(United Kingdom) Cecil Betts	6	0	0	2
(Germany) Gottfried von Cramm	4	6	6	6
(India) Syed Mohammad Hadi	4	0	4
(Republic of Ireland) Henry Purcell	6	6	6
Q	(United Kingdom) Freddie Della Porta	1	0	4
(France) Christian Boussus	6	6	6
(Japan) Eikishi Ito	2	6	1
5	(United States) Cliff Sutter	6	8	6

Second round
(Japan) I Aoki	6	6	6
Q	(United Kingdom) D Morris	1	3	2
(United Kingdom) P Hughes	6	6	6
(United Kingdom) R Ritchie	3	4	4
(Germany) G von Cramm	6	6	6
(Republic of Ireland) H Purcell	0	2	3
(France) C Boussus	6	8	4	2
5	(United States) C Sutter	4	10	6	6

Third round
(Japan) I Aoki	2	1	0
(United Kingdom) P Hughes	6	6	6
(Germany) G von Cramm	3	4	7
5	(United States) C Sutter	6	6	9

Fourth round
(United Kingdom) P Hughes	9	7	6
5	(United States) C Sutter	7	5	3

==== Section 8 ====
First round
(Belgium) Léopold de Borman	6	6	6	6
(Soviet Union) Sergei Rodzianko	8	2	3	2
(United Kingdom) John Olliff	7	6	5	1	0^{r}
(New Zealand) Alan Stedman	5	4	7	6	3
(South Africa) Jack Condon	7	6	6
(Czechoslovakia) Josef Maleček	5	4	3
(Austria) Adam Baworowski	2	4	6
(United Kingdom) Arthur Vinall	6	6	8
(United States) Donald Frame	6	4	4	4
(Hungary) Béla von Kehrling	2	6	6	6
(Italy) Alberto del Bono	3	7	2	4
(France) Antoine Gentien	6	5	6	6
(France) André Martin-Legeay	7	6	6
(United Kingdom) Malcolm Young	5	4	2
(Spain) Enrique Maier	5	4	6	6	4
2	(Australia) Jack Crawford	7	6	2	3	6

Second round
(Belgium) L de Borman	5	5	1
(New Zealand) A Stedman	7	7	6
(South Africa) J Condon	6	6	6
(United Kingdom) A Vinall	2	1	1
(Hungary) B von Kehrling	7	2	8	1	3
(France) A Gentien	5	6	6	6	6
(France) A Martin-Legeay	2	8	0	1
2	(Australia) J Crawford	6	6	6	6

Third round
(New Zealand) A Stedman	9	6	6	5	6
(South Africa) J Condon	11	3	2	7	3
(France) A Gentien	3	4	6
2	(Australia) J Crawford	6	6	8

Fourth round
(New Zealand) A Stedman	1	4	2
2	(Australia) J Crawford	6	6	6

Preceded by 1933 French Championships	Grand Slams; Men's Singles	Succeeded by 1933 U.S. Championships
