= 1932 Wimbledon Championships – Mixed doubles =

1932 tennis event results

Mixed doubles
- 1932 Wimbledon Championships

Final
- Champions: (Spain) Enrique Maier (United States) Elizabeth Ryan
- Runners-up: (Australia) Harry Hopman (Belgium) Josane Sigart
- Score: 7–5, 6–2

Details
- Draw: 80 (5Q)
- Seeds: 8

Events
Singles	men	women		boys	girls
Doubles	men	women	mixed	boys	girls
- Wimbledon Championships

George Lott and Anna Harper were the defending champions, but Lott did not compete. Harper partnered with Ian Collins, but lost in the fourth round to Jacques Brugnon and Simonne Mathieu.

Enrique Maier and Elizabeth Ryan defeated Harry Hopman and Josane Sigart in the final, 7–5, 6–2 to win the mixed doubles tennis title at the 1932 Wimbledon Championships.

== Seeds ==
1. (United States) Ellsworth Vines / (United States) Helen Moody (quarterfinals)
2. (France) Henri Cochet / (United Kingdom) Eileen Fearnley-Whittingstall (semifinals)
3. (France) Jacques Brugnon / (France) Simonne Mathieu (semifinals)
4. (Spain) Enrique Maier / (United States) Elizabeth Ryan (champions)
5. (United States) Wilmer Allison / (United States) Helen Jacobs (third round)
6. (Australia) Harry Hopman / (Belgium) Josane Sigart (final)
7. (South Africa) Pat Spence / (United Kingdom) Betty Nuthall (quarterfinals)
8. (United States) Gregory Mangin / (United States) Sarah Palfrey (fourth round)

Click on the seed number of a player to go to their draw section.

== Draw ==
Key

- Q = Qualifier
- WC = Wild card
- LL = Lucky loser
- Alt = Alternate
- ITF = ITF entry
- PR = Protected ranking
- SR = Special ranking
- SE = Special exempt
- JE = Junior exempt
- JR = Junior Accelerator Programme entrant
- CO = College Accelerator Programme entrant
- NG = Next Gen Accelerator Program entrant
- w/o = Walkover
- r = Retired
- d = Defaulted

=== Finals ===
Quarterfinals
1	(United States) Ellsworth Vines (United States) Helen Moody	w/o
6	(Australia) Harry Hopman (Belgium) Josane Sigart
3	(France) Jacques Brugnon (France) Simonne Mathieu	7	3	6
(Australia) Jack Crawford (Australia) Marjorie Crawford	5	6	3
7	(South Africa) Pat Spence (United Kingdom) Betty Nuthall	4	5
4	(Spain) Enrique Maier (United States) Elizabeth Ryan	6	6
(New Zealand) Buster Andrews (United Kingdom) Kay Stammers	3	8	4
2	(France) Henri Cochet (United Kingdom) Eileen Fearnley-Whittingstall	6	6	6

Semifinals
6	(Australia) Harry Hopman (Belgium) Josane Sigart	6	6
3	(France) Jacques Brugnon (France) Simonne Mathieu	4	4
4	(Spain) Enrique Maier (United States) Elizabeth Ryan	7	3	6
2	(France) Henri Cochet (United Kingdom) Eileen Fearnley-Whittingstall	5	6	1

Final
6	(Australia) Harry Hopman (Belgium) Josane Sigart	5	2
4	(Spain) Enrique Maier (United States) Elizabeth Ryan	7	6

=== Top half ===
==== Section 1 ====
First round

Second round
1	(United States) Ellsworth Vines (United States) Helen Moody	6	6
Q	(United Kingdom) Douglas Hodges (United Kingdom) Marjorie Stork	0	3
(Germany) Heinrich Kleinschroth (United Kingdom) Davinia Townsend	w/o
(France) Antoine Gentien (France) Doris Metaxa
(Hungary) Béla von Kehrling (United States) Dorothy Burke	6	4	3
(Netherlands) Josef Knottenbelt (Netherlands) Madzy Couquerque	0	6	6
(United Kingdom) Patrick Wheatley (United Kingdom) Nancy Lyle	4	6	1
(United Kingdom) Bob Tinkler (United Kingdom) Susan Noel	6	1	6

Third round
1	(United States) E Vines (United States) H Moody	6	9
(France) A Gentien (France) D Metaxa	3	7
(Netherlands) J Knottenbelt (Netherlands) M Couquerque	4	6	6
(United Kingdom) R Tinkler (United Kingdom) S Noel	6	2	3

Fourth round
1	(United States) E Vines (United States) H Moody	6	6
(Netherlands) J Knottenbelt (Netherlands) M Couquerque	2	4

==== Section 2 ====
First round

Second round
6	(Australia) Harry Hopman (Belgium) Josane Sigart	6	6
(France) Emmanuel du Plaix (United Kingdom) JE Stevens	2	1
(United Kingdom) John Leader (United Kingdom) Sheila Hewitt	3	7	4
(Poland) Ignacy Tłoczyński (Poland) Jadwiga Jędrzejowska	6	5	6
(United Kingdom) Norman Latchford (United Kingdom) Dorothy Jameson	5	4
(United Kingdom) Frank Wilde (United Kingdom) Beatrice Feltham	7	6
(United Kingdom) Lewis Michell (United Kingdom) Peggy Michell	7	0	1
(Japan) Ryuki Miki (United Kingdom) Dorothy Round	5	6	6

Third round
6	(Australia) H Hopman (Belgium) J Sigart	6	6
(Poland) I Tłoczyński (Poland) J Jędrzejowska	4	4
(United Kingdom) F Wilde (United Kingdom) B Feltham	3	6	4
(Japan) T Miki (United Kingdom) D Round	6	3	6

Fourth round
6	(Australia) H Hopman (Belgium) J Sigart	3	6	7
(Japan) T Miki (United Kingdom) D Round	6	3	5

==== Section 3 ====
First round

Second round
3	(France) Jacques Brugnon (France) Simonne Mathieu	6	6
(Germany) Louis Haensch (Germany) Marie Horn	4	2
(United Kingdom) RG Bernard (United Kingdom) Madge Slaney	3	4
(United Kingdom) Eric Peters (United Kingdom) Effie Peters	6	6
(United Kingdom) Jimmy Reddall (United Kingdom) Dorothy Anderson	6	3	3
(South Africa) Gerald Sherwell (United Kingdom) Vera Montgomery	3	6	6
(Czechoslovakia) Roderich Menzel (United Kingdom) Gwen Sterry	4	3
(United Kingdom) Ian Collins (United States) Anna Harper	6	6

Third round
3	(France) J Brugnon (France) S Mathieu	2	6	6
(United Kingdom) E Peters (United Kingdom) E Peters	6	1	4
(South Africa) G Sherwell (United Kingdom) V Montgomery	5	3
(United Kingdom) I Collins (United States) A Harper	7	6

Fourth round
3	(France) J Brugnon (France) S Mathieu	6	6
(United Kingdom) I Collins (United States) A Harper	3	2

==== Section 4 ====
First round
5	(United States) Wilmer Allison (United States) Helen Jacobs
(Austria) Franz Matejka (Italy) Lucia Valerio	w/o
(United Kingdom) Raymond Tuckey (United Kingdom) Agnes Tuckey	2	4
(United Kingdom) Charles Kingsley (United Kingdom) Kitty Godfree	6	6
Q	(United Kingdom) Colin Ritchie (United Kingdom) Gethyn Harry	1	6	7
(United Kingdom) Edward Buzzard (United Kingdom) Evelyn Goldsworth	6	3	5
(Denmark) Anker Jacobsen (United Kingdom) Jeanette Morfey	1	6
(Australia) Jack Crawford (Australia) Marjorie Crawford	6	8
(Japan) Iwao Aoki (South Africa) Irene Peacock	6	6
(United Kingdom) Philip Glover (United Kingdom) Naomi Trentham	1	3
(Soviet Union) Sergei Rodzianko (Spain) Bella Pons
(France) Paul Féret (United Kingdom) Sybil Edwards	w/o
(United Kingdom) Cyril Eames (United Kingdom) Evelyn Dearman	6	3	6
(Egypt) Jacques Grandguillot; Mrs G Hawkins	3	6	0
(United Kingdom) Harry Lee (United Kingdom) Phyllis King	4	6	3
(United Kingdom) Billy Collins (United Kingdom) Olga Webb	6	4	6

Second round
5	(United States) W Allison (United States) H Jacobs	2	6	6
(United Kingdom) C Kingsley (United Kingdom) K Godfree	6	2	2
(United Kingdom) C Ritchie (United Kingdom) G Harry	3	7	3
(Australia) J Crawford (Australia) M Crawford	6	5	6
(Japan) I Aoki (South Africa) I Peacock	6	6
(Soviet Union) S Rodzianko (Spain) B Pons	4	3
(United Kingdom) C Eames (United Kingdom) E Dearman	4	6	2
(United Kingdom) W Collins (United Kingdom) O Webb	6	4	6

Third round
5	(United States) W Allison (United States) H Jacobs	0	4
(Australia) J Crawford (Australia) M Crawford	6	6
(Japan) I Aoki (South Africa) I Peacock	4	6	6
(United Kingdom) W Collins (United Kingdom) O Webb	6	2	1

Fourth round
(Australia) J Crawford (Australia) M Crawford	7	2	6
(Japan) I Aoki (South Africa) I Peacock	5	6	2

The nationality of Mrs G Hawkins is unknown.

=== Bottom half ===
==== Section 5 ====
First round
(United Kingdom) Alan Brown (United Kingdom) Madge List	3	7	11
(Argentina) Carlos Magrane (United Kingdom) Margaret Mellows	6	5	13
(Japan) Jiro Sato (United Kingdom) MA Thomas	6	6
(Austria) Hermann Artens (United Kingdom) Phyllis Satterthwaite	1	4
(Germany) Gottfried von Cramm (Germany) Hilde Krahwinkel	6	7
(New Zealand) James Giesen (United Kingdom) Betty Dix	3	5
(United Kingdom) Kenneth Gandar-Dower (South Africa) Mrs WG Lowe	5	1
(United Kingdom) John Olliff (United Kingdom) Joan Ridley	7	6
(Japan) Takeo Kuwabara (United Kingdom) Billie Yorke	7	4
(France) André Merlin (France) Colette Rosambert	9	6
Q	(United Kingdom) Orson Wright (United Kingdom) J McAlpine	w/o
(United Kingdom) Alfred Ingram (United Kingdom) Peggy Pleydell-Bouverie
(United Kingdom) Herman David (United Kingdom) Freda James	6	5	6
(Australia) Cliff Sproule (United Kingdom) Elsa Haylock	2	7	1
(United Kingdom) Arthur Vinall (United Kingdom) Violet Owen	6	3	4
7	(South Africa) Pat Spence (United Kingdom) Betty Nuthall	4	6	6

Second round
(Argentina) C Magrane (United Kingdom) M Mellows	0	0
(Japan) J Sato (United Kingdom) MA Thomas	6	6
(Germany) G von Cramm (Germany) H Krahwinkel	6	7
(United Kingdom) J Olliff (United Kingdom) J Ridley	3	5
(France) A Merlin (France) C Rosambert	7	6
(United Kingdom) A Ingram (United Kingdom) M Pleydell-Bouverie	5	4
(United Kingdom) H David (United Kingdom) W James	7	9
7	(South Africa) P Spence (United Kingdom) B Nuthall	9	11

Third round
(Japan) J Sato (United Kingdom) MA Thomas	3	6	2
(Germany) G von Cramm (Germany) H Krahwinkel	6	4	6
(France) A Merlin (France) C Rosambert	5	6	2
7	(South Africa) P Spence (United Kingdom) B Nuthall	7	3	6

Fourth round
(Germany) G von Cramm (Germany) H Krahwinkel	5	6	2
7	(South Africa) P Spence (United Kingdom) B Nuthall	7	2	6

==== Section 6 ====
First round

Second round
(Australia) Jack Clemenger (United Kingdom) Phyllis Covell	6	6
(United Kingdom) David Williams (United Kingdom) Ermyntrude Harvey	4	3
Q	(Republic of Ireland) Harold Price (United Kingdom) Andree Lucas	2	3
(United Kingdom) Pat Hughes (United Kingdom) Dorothy Shepherd-Barron	6	6
(France) Christian Boussus (United Kingdom) Peggy Scriven	4	6	3
(United Kingdom) Keats Lester (United Kingdom) Phoebe Watson	6	4	6
(United Kingdom) Laddie Wheatcroft (United Kingdom) Christabel Wheatcroft	1	1
4	(Spain) Enrique Maier (United States) Elizabeth Ryan	6	6

Third round
(Australia) J Clemenger (United Kingdom) P Covell	3	6	6
(United Kingdom) P Hughes (United Kingdom) D Shepherd-Barron	6	3	4
(United Kingdom) K Lester (United Kingdom) P Watson	w/o
4	(Spain) E Maier (United States) E Ryan

Fourth round
(Australia) J Clemenger (United Kingdom) P Covell	7	2	0
4	(Spain) E Maier (United States) E Ryan	5	6	6

==== Section 7 ====
First round

Second round
(Monaco) Vladimir Landau (United Kingdom) Mabel Clayton	7	4	2
(United Kingdom) Brian Gilbert (United Kingdom) Betty Uber	5	6	6
(New Zealand) Buster Andrews (United Kingdom) Kay Stammers	2	6	6
(Switzerland) Hector Fisher (Switzerland) Lolette Payot	6	4	4
(United Kingdom) Gwyn Tuckett (United Kingdom) Gladys Seel	5	1
(Netherlands) Hendrik Timmer (Netherlands) Els Belzer	7	6
(United Kingdom) Ted Avory (United Kingdom) Freda Scott	0	3
8	(United States) Gregory Mangin (United States) Sarah Palfrey	6	6

Third round
(United Kingdom) B Gilbert (United Kingdom) E Uber	5	4
(New Zealand) E Andrews (United Kingdom) K Stammers	7	6
(Netherlands) H Timmer (Netherlands) E Belzer	2	2
8	(United States) G Mangin (United States) S Palfrey	6	6

Fourth round
(New Zealand) E Andrews (United Kingdom) K Stammers	6	6
8	(United States) G Mangin (United States) S Palfrey	4	4

==== Section 8 ====
First round

Second round
(United Kingdom) John Fletcher (United Kingdom) Joan Ingram	6	6
(United Kingdom) Stan Harris (France) Elizabeth Macready	4	2
(United Kingdom) Colin Gregory (United Kingdom) Elsie Pittman	4	6	6
(Egypt) Jacques Grandguillot (France) Jacqueline Goldschmidt	6	3	2
(New Zealand) Cam Malfroy (United Kingdom) Mary Heeley	6	8
(United Kingdom) Bunny Austin (United Kingdom) Joan Lycett	3	6
(Italy) Giovanni Palmieri (United Kingdom) Winifred Beamish	w/o
2	(France) Henri Cochet (United Kingdom) Eileen Fearnley-Whittingstall

Third round
(United Kingdom) J Fletcher (United Kingdom) J Ingram	2	6	5
(United Kingdom) C Gregory (United Kingdom) E Pittman	6	3	7
(New Zealand) C Malfroy (United Kingdom) M Heeley	5	4
2	(France) H Cochet (United Kingdom) E Fearnley-Whittingstall	7	6

Fourth round
(United Kingdom) C Gregory (United Kingdom) E Pittman	2	6
2	(France) H Cochet (United Kingdom) E Fearnley-Whittingstall	6	8
