= 1932 Wimbledon Championships – Men's singles =

Men's singles
- 1932 Wimbledon Championships

Final
- Champion: (United States) Ellsworth Vines
- Runner-up: (United Kingdom) Bunny Austin
- Score: 6–4, 6–2, 6–0

Details
- Draw: 128 (10Q)
- Seeds: 8

Events
Singles	men	women		boys	girls
Doubles	men	women	mixed	boys	girls
- Wimbledon Championships

Ellsworth Vines defeated Bunny Austin 6–4, 6–2, 6–0 in the final to win the gentlemen's singles tennis title at the 1932 Wimbledon Championships. Sidney Wood was the defending champion, but lost in the quarterfinals to Jiro Sato.

== Seeds ==
1. (France) Henri Cochet (second round)
2. (United States) Ellsworth Vines (champion)
3. (United States) Frank Shields (quarterfinals)
4. (United Kingdom) Fred Perry (quarterfinals)
5. (United States) Sidney Wood (quarterfinals)
6. (United Kingdom) Bunny Austin (final)
7. (France) Jean Borotra (fourth round)
8. (Australia) Jack Crawford (semifinals)

Click on the seed number of a player to go to their draw section.

== Draw ==
Key

- Q = Qualifier
- WC = Wild card
- LL = Lucky loser
- Alt = Alternate
- ITF = ITF entry
- PR = Protected ranking
- SR = Special ranking
- SE = Special exempt
- JE = Junior exempt
- JR = Junior Accelerator Programme entrant
- CO = College Accelerator Programme entrant
- NG = Next Gen Accelerator Program entrant
- w/o = Walkover
- r = Retired
- d = Defaulted

=== Finals ===
Quarterfinals
2	(United States) Ellsworth Vines	6	6	6
(Spain) Enrique Maier	2	3	2
4	(United Kingdom) Fred Perry	5	6	6	6
8	(Australia) Jack Crawford	7	8	2	8
6	(United Kingdom) Bunny Austin	6	9	5	6
3	(United States) Frank Shields	1	7	7	1
5	(United States) Sidney Wood	5	5	6	4
(Japan) Jiro Sato	7	7	2	6

Semifinals
2	(United States) Ellsworth Vines	6	6	6
8	(Australia) Jack Crawford	2	1	3
6	(United Kingdom) Bunny Austin	7	6	6
(Japan) Jiro Sato	5	2	1

Final
2	(United States) Ellsworth Vines	6	6	6
6	(United Kingdom) Bunny Austin	4	2	0

=== Top half ===
==== Section 1 ====
First round
2	(United States) Ellsworth Vines	7	6	6
(France) Emmanuel du Plaix	5	3	4
(Belgium) Guy Van Zuylen	7	1	8	2	4
(United Kingdom) Henry Burrows	5	6	6	6	6
(United Kingdom) Jimmy Nuthall	3	1	6
(Australia) Harry Hopman	6	6	8
(New Zealand) Cam Malfroy	6	6	6
(United Kingdom) Peter Graves	1	1	0
Q	(United Kingdom) Arnold England	3	4	2
(United Kingdom) Raymond Tuckey	6	6	6
(United Kingdom) Jack Lysaght	6	4	5	7	2
(Czechoslovakia) Josef Šíba	3	6	7	5	6
(Austria) Harry Kinzl	6	8	3	6	6
(United Kingdom) Walter Michelmore	2	10	6	4	3
(France) Pierre Henri Landry	4	4	3
(Japan) Iwao Aoki	6	6	6

Second round
2	(United States) E Vines	6	6	3	6
(United Kingdom) H Burrows	1	2	6	3
(Australia) H Hopman	6	6	6
(New Zealand) C Malfroy	3	1	2
(United Kingdom) R Tuckey	7	6	6
(Czechoslovakia) J Šíba	5	2	4
(Austria) H Kinzl	3	0	4
(Japan) I Aoki	6	6	6

Third round
2	(United States) E Vines	7	6	7
(Australia) H Hopman	5	2	5
(United Kingdom) R Tuckey	2	3	2
(Japan) I Aoki	6	6	6

Fourth round
2	(United States) E Vines	6	3	6	6
(Japan) I Aoki	2	6	3	2

==== Section 2 ====
First round
7	(France) Jean Borotra	0	6	1	6	6
(France) André Merlin	6	1	6	4	2
(United Kingdom) Colin Ritchie	6	6	6
(Netherlands) Josef Knottenbelt	1	2	4
(United Kingdom) Max Callendar	4	4	2
(United Kingdom) Dickie Ritchie	6	6	6
(United Kingdom) Harry Lee	6	8	6
(United Kingdom) Philip Glover	3	6	4
(Spain) Enrique Maier	6	7	6
(Hungary) Béla von Kehrling	3	5	4
(Germany) Louis Haensch	6	4	3	6	2
(United Kingdom) Freddie Della Porta	4	6	6	0	6
(Romania) Nicolas Magaloff	8	7	2
(Republic of Ireland) George Lyttleton-Rogers	10	9	6
(United Kingdom) Frank Wilde	6	6	6
(United Kingdom) Geoffrey de Ste. Croix	2	1	2

Second round
7	(France) J Borotra	6	6	3	6
(United Kingdom) C Ritchie	4	1	6	1
(United Kingdom) R Ritchie	3	5	4
(United Kingdom) H Lee	6	7	6
(Spain) E Maier	6	6	6
(United Kingdom) A Della Porta	1	3	1
(Republic of Ireland) G Lyttleton-Rogers	5	4	4
(United Kingdom) F Wilde	7	6	6

Third round
7	(France) J Borotra	6	7	6
(United Kingdom) H Lee	3	5	1
(Spain) E Maier	6	6	6
(United Kingdom) F Wilde	4	3	3

Fourth round
7	(France) J Borotra	3	3	6	2
(Spain) E Maier	6	6	2	6

==== Section 3 ====
First round
4	(United Kingdom) Fred Perry	6	6	6
(United Kingdom) Oswald Jameson	3	2	4
(United Kingdom) Herman David	6	6	6
(India) Hira-Lal Soni	3	0	3
Q	(United Kingdom) Cecil Betts	2	1	0
(United Kingdom) Patrick Wheatley	6	6	6
(United Kingdom) Charles Kingsley	3	5	6	6
(United States) John Van Ryn	6	7	2	8
Q	(United Kingdom) Afzal Hyat	1	2	1
(United Kingdom) Arthur Hill	6	6	6
(Denmark) Arne Rasmussen	3	6	4	1
(Japan) Ryuki Miki	6	4	6	6
(United States) Wilmer Allison	6	4	6	3	6
(United Kingdom) Gwyn Tuckett	3	6	1	6	2
(United Kingdom) George Godsell	1	3	5
(Poland) Ignacy Tłoczyński	6	6	7

Second round
4	(United Kingdom) F Perry	6	6	5	6
(United Kingdom) H David	4	3	7	1
(United Kingdom) P Wheatley	3	4	5
(United States) J Van Ryn	6	6	7
(United Kingdom) A Hill	5	3	2
(Japan) T Miki	7	6	6
(United States) W Allison	8	6	6
(Poland) I Tłoczyński	6	3	2

Third round
4	(United Kingdom) F Perry	6	6	6
(United States) J Van Ryn	3	4	0
(Japan) T Miki	4	0	6	1
(United States) W Allison	6	6	2	6

Fourth round
4	(United Kingdom) F Perry	6	6	4	6
(United States) W Allison	4	1	6	2

==== Section 4 ====
First round
8	(Australia) Jack Crawford	6	6	6
(United Kingdom) Arthur Vinall	4	3	3
(Monaco) Vladimir Landau	3	6	5
(United Kingdom) Colin Gregory	6	8	7
(India) Athar-Ali Fyzee	4	3	1
(Germany) Gottfried von Cramm	6	6	6
(France) Christian Boussus	8	6	4	6
(India) Atri Madan Mohan	6	2	6	3
(Austria) Franz Matejka	6	6	6
(United Kingdom) William Powell	0	3	3
(United Kingdom) John Olliff	6	4	6	6
(United Kingdom) Billy Collins	0	6	0	1
(United Kingdom) RG Bernard	5	8	6	3	6
Q	(United Kingdom) John Shales	7	6	3	6	1
(Egypt) Jacques Grandguillot
(Switzerland) Hector Fisher	w/o

Second round
8	(Australia) J Crawford	2	6	8	6
(United Kingdom) C Gregory	6	2	6	4
(Germany) G von Cramm	6	6	0	4
(France) C Boussus	4	8	6	6
(Austria) F-W Matejka	1	4	2
(United Kingdom) J Olliff	6	6	6
(United Kingdom) RG Bernard	6	3	7	2
(Egypt) J Grandguillot	8	6	5	6

Third round
8	(Australia) J Crawford	9	6	6
(France) C Boussus	7	4	2
(United Kingdom) J Olliff	6	6	6
(Egypt) J Grandguillot	2	0	3

Fourth round
8	(Australia) J Crawford	6	6	3	6
(United Kingdom) J Olliff	3	4	6	1

=== Bottom half ===
==== Section 5 ====
First round
(United Kingdom) Edward Buzzard	6	6	9	1
(Soviet Union) Sergei Rodzianko	4	8	11	6
(France) Paul Féret	3	7	0
(United Kingdom) RC Wackett	6	5	1^{r}
(United Kingdom) Alan Brown	5	6	6	3	7
(Austria) Hermann Artens	7	2	3	6	5
(United Kingdom) Keats Lester	6	2	2	2
(Australia) Jack Clemenger	0	6	6	6
(United Kingdom) Eric Peters	6	6	4	6
(United Kingdom) David Williams	2	4	6	4
(United Kingdom) Eric Attewell	7	4	6	6
(United Kingdom) Jimmy Jones	5	6	1	4
(United Kingdom) Tony Crossley	0	3	0
(United Kingdom) Kenneth Gandar-Dower	6	6	6
(United Kingdom) Malcolm Young	2	7	3
6	(United Kingdom) Bunny Austin	6	9	6

Second round
(Soviet Union) S Rodzianko	7	4	6	3	4
(France) P Féret	5	6	4	6	6
(United Kingdom) A Brown	4	1	7
(Australia) J Clemenger	6	6	9
(United Kingdom) E Peters	6	6	6
(United Kingdom) E Attewell	4	4	3
(United Kingdom) K Gandar-Dower	2	6	3	2
6	(United Kingdom) H Austin	6	4	6	6

Third round
(France) P Féret	4	6	4	6	6
(Australia) J Clemenger	6	1	6	0	3
(United Kingdom) E Peters	1	4	2
6	(United Kingdom) H Austin	6	6	6

Fourth round
(France) P Féret	4	6	6	3
6	(United Kingdom) H Austin	6	8	4	6

==== Section 6 ====
First round
Q	(United Kingdom) Hugh Mackinnon	4	3	6	7
(United Kingdom) Brian Finnigan	6	6	2	9
Q	(Republic of Ireland) Harold Price	9	8	6	2	3
Q	(United Kingdom) James Cummins	11	6	3	6	6
(Japan) Takeo Kuwabara	6	6	3	2	2
(United Kingdom) Pat Hughes	4	2	6	6	6
(United Kingdom) John Leader	0	1	0
(Czechoslovakia) Roderich Menzel	6	6	6
(France) Jacques Brugnon	4	3	3
(New Zealand) Buster Andrews	6	6	6
(United Kingdom) Bob Tinkler	6	6	3	6
(United Kingdom) Jimmy Reddall	3	3	6	4
Q	(United Kingdom) Norman Taylor
(Republic of Ireland) Noel Holmes	w/o
(Egypt) Pierre Grandguillot	1	3	3
3	(United States) Frank Shields	6	6	6

Second round
(United Kingdom) B Finnigan	6	6	6
Q	(United Kingdom) J Cummins	0	4	2
(United Kingdom) P Hughes	6	6	4	2
(Czechoslovakia) R Menzel	8	1	6	6
(New Zealand) E Andrews	10	6	6
(United Kingdom) R Tinkler	8	0	3
Q	(United Kingdom) N Taylor	3	4	1
3	(United States) F Shields	6	6	6

Third round
(United Kingdom) B Finnigan	2	3	1
(Czechoslovakia) R Menzel	6	6	6
(New Zealand) E Andrews	6	15	3	5	2
3	(United States) F Shields	4	13	6	7	6

Fourth round
(Czechoslovakia) R Menzel	3	4	12	4
3	(United States) F Shields	6	6	10	6

==== Section 7 ====
First round
(United States) Gregory Mangin	6	6	6
(Czechoslovakia) Ladislav Hecht	1	0	3
(Australia) Cliff Sproule	6	6	6
(United Kingdom) Wilfred Freeman	4	0	2
(India) Janmeja Charanjiva	4	2	0
(United Kingdom) Teddy Higgs	6	6	6
(United Kingdom) Nigel Sharpe	4	6	6	4	8
(United Kingdom) Ted Avory	6	1	1	6	10
(France) Antoine Gentien	6	4	6	6
(United Kingdom) Stan Harris	2	6	2	2
Q	(United Kingdom) Henry Weatherall	2	6	1	6	5
(Denmark) Anker Jacobsen	6	1	6	4	7
(United Kingdom) Laddie Wheatcroft
(United Kingdom) Jack Hillyard	w/o
(United Kingdom) Martin Wedd	2	2	6
5	(United States) Sidney Wood	6	6	8

Second round
(United States) G Mangin	6	6	9
(Australia) C Sproule	2	2	7
(United Kingdom) E Higgs	3	4	6
(United Kingdom) E Avory	6	6	8
(France) A Gentien	7	8	6	8
(Denmark) A Jacobsen	9	6	4	6
(United Kingdom) I Wheatcroft	3	7	1	3
5	(United States) S Wood	6	5	6	6

Third round
(United States) G Mangin	7	6	6
(United Kingdom) E Avory	5	1	4
(France) A Gentien	2	3	2
5	(United States) S Wood	6	6	6

Fourth round
(United States) G Mangin	1	7	3
5	(United States) S Wood	6	9	6

==== Section 8 ====
First round
(United Kingdom) Brian Gilbert
(Italy) Giovanni Palmieri	w/o
(Netherlands) Hendrik Timmer
(United Kingdom) Orson Wright	w/o
(Argentina) Carlos Magrane	4	6	6	4	6
(Republic of Ireland) Henry Purcell	6	1	1	6	2
(United Kingdom) Douglas Freshwater	3	6	7	6	2
(Germany) Heinrich Kleinschroth	6	1	9	2	6
(United Kingdom) Leighton Crawford	1	3	3
(United Kingdom) Pat Sherwood	6	6	6
(United Kingdom) Norman Latchford	2	3	2
(Japan) Jiro Sato	6	6	6
(United Kingdom) Ian Collins	6	6	7
(United Kingdom) Wilfred Smith	1	1	5
Q	(United Kingdom) Paul Partridge	5	3	2
1	(France) Henri Cochet	7	6	6

Second round
(United Kingdom) B Gilbert	3	2	3
(Netherlands) H Timmer	6	6	6
(Argentina) C Magrane	1	6	6	12
(Germany) H Kleinschroth	6	8	4	14
(United Kingdom) P Sherwood	8	4	4
(Japan) J Sato	10	6	6
(United Kingdom) I Collins	6	8	0	6
1	(France) H Cochet	2	6	6	3

Third round
(Netherlands) H Timmer	6	2
(Germany) H Kleinschroth	2	3^{r}
(Japan) J Sato	6	6	6
(United Kingdom) I Collins	4	4	2

Fourth round
(Netherlands) H Timmer	3	2	4
(Japan) J Sato	6	6	6

Preceded by 1932 French Championships	Grand Slams; Men's Singles	Succeeded by 1932 U.S. Championships
