= Norman Farquharson =

South African tennis player

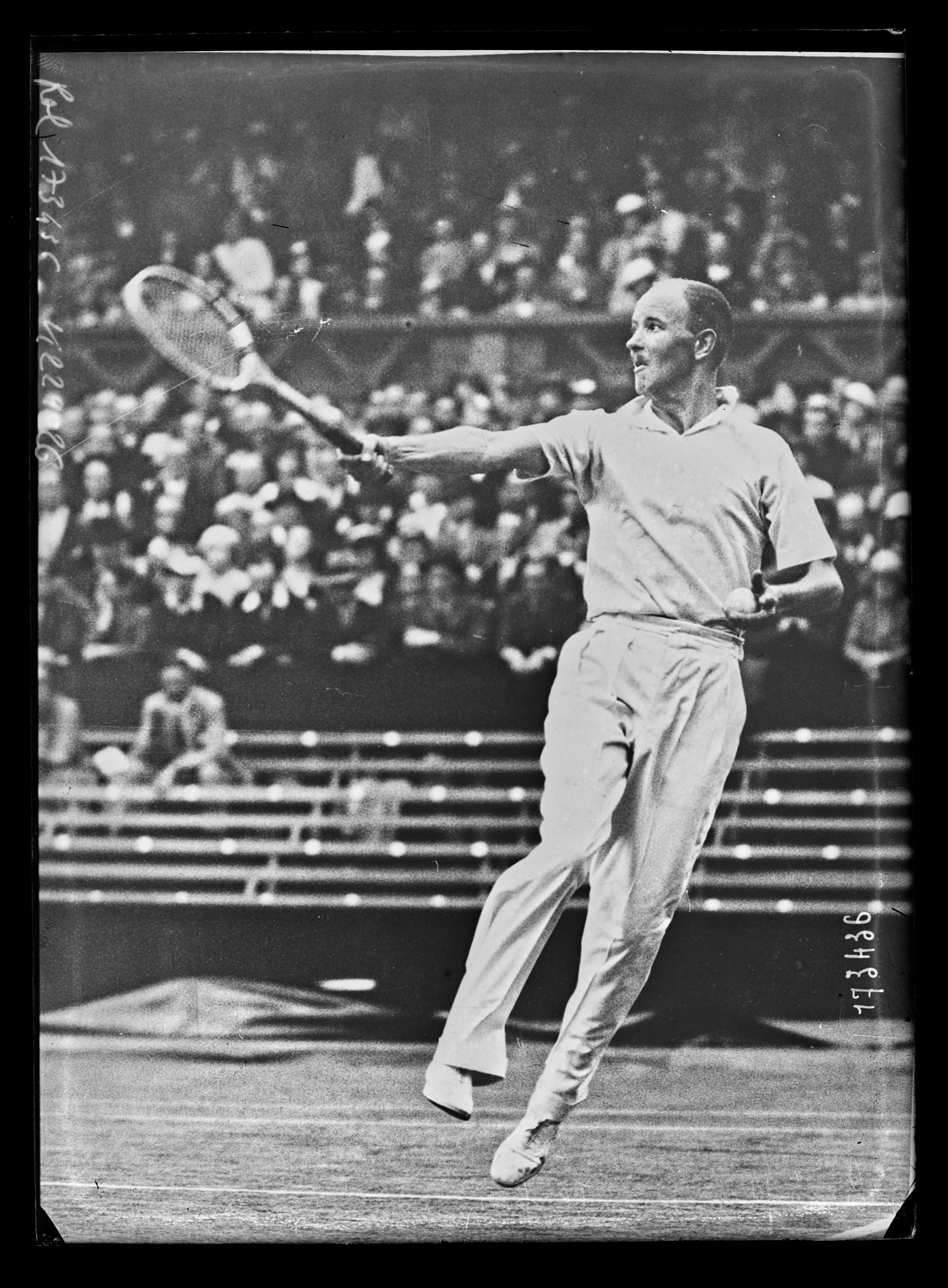
- Norman Farquharson (Wimbledon, 1933)
- Full name: Norman Gordon Farquharson
- Country (sports): South Africa
- Born: 18 July 1907 Johannesburg, South Africa
- Died: 11 August 1992 (aged 85) Durban, South Africa

Singles

Grand Slam singles results
- French Open: 3R (1937)
- Wimbledon: 3R (1927, 1933, 1935)

Doubles

Grand Slam doubles results
- French Open: F (1931, 1937)
- Wimbledon: SF (1933)

Mixed doubles

Grand Slam mixed doubles results
- Wimbledon: F (1933)

Norman Gordon Farquharson (18 July 1907 – 11 August 1992) was a male tennis player from South Africa.

In 1931 Farquharson and his compatriot partner Vernon Kirby were runners-up in the doubles final of the French Championships, losing in straight sets to the American pair George Lott and John Van Ryn. In 1937 they again reached the doubles final in which they lost to the German pair Gottfried von Cramm and Henner Henkel in four sets.

Farquharson won the singles title of the South African Championships on four occasions (1934, 1935, 1936, 1938).

Between 1929 and 1937 he played in twelve ties for the South African Davis Cup team. The best team result during that period was reaching the semifinal of the European Zone in 1935 against Czechoslovakia. Farquharson had a Davis Cup match record of 13 wins vs. 10 losses and was more successful in doubles (9/3) than singles (4/7).

== Grand Slam finals ==
=== Doubles (2 runners-up) ===
Result	Year	Championship	Surface	Partner	Opponents	Score
Loss	1931	French Championships	Clay	(South Africa) Vernon Kirby	(United States) George Lott (United States) John Van Ryn	4–6, 3–6, 4–6
Loss	1937	French Championships	Clay	(South Africa) Vernon Kirby	(Germany) Gottfried von Cramm (Germany) Henner Henkel	4–6, 5–7, 6–3, 1–6

=== Mixed doubles (1 runner-up) ===
Result	Year	Championship	Surface	Partner	Opponents	Score
Loss	1933	Wimbledon	Grass	(United Kingdom) Mary Heeley	(Germany) Hilde Krahwinkel (Germany) Gottfried von Cramm	5–7, 6–8
