= Alan Stedman =

New Zealand tennis player

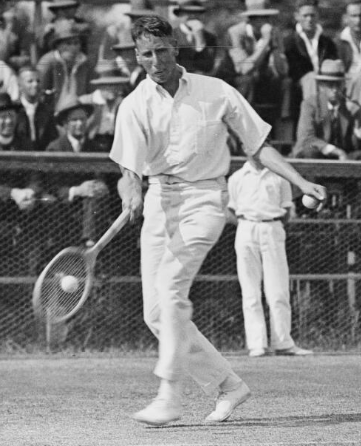
- Full name: Alan Christie Stedman
- Country (sports): New Zealand
- Born: 23 April 1908; Palmerston North
- Died: 1 July 1984 (aged 76)
- Plays: Right-handed

Singles

Grand Slam singles results
- Wimbledon: 4R (1933, 1937)

Doubles

Grand Slam doubles results
- Wimbledon: QF (1933, 1936)

Grand Slam mixed doubles results
- Wimbledon: 3R (1933, 1934)

Alan Christie Stedman (23 April 1908 – 1 July 1984) was a New Zealand tennis player.

== Biography ==
Born in Palmerston North, Stedman was New Zealand's 1930 national singles champion.

Stedman, credited with a strong forehand, competed on tour through the 1930s. On his Wimbledon debut in 1933 he came from two sets down to win his first round match over John Olliff, later losing to Jack Crawford in the fourth round. He made the fourth round again in 1937 and lost in five sets to Bryan Grant. As a doubles player he twice reached the Wimbledon quarter-finals. His career titles included the 1935 Irish Championships, where he beat his countryman Cam Malfroy in the final. He played Davis Cup for New Zealand between 1934 and 1937.

In World War II he served as a Second Lieutenant in the army and fought in the Western Desert campaign. He was a German prisoner of war for four years. After the war he worked as an accountant.

== See also ==
- List of New Zealand Davis Cup team representatives
