= Laddie Wheatcroft =

British-American tennis player (1904–1967)

- Full name: Irving Horace Wheatcroft
- Country (sports): (United Kingdom) Great Britain
- Born: 1904 Wheatcroft, Kentucky, United States
- Died: 14 February 1967 (aged 62) Ulster County, New York, United States

Singles

Grand Slam singles results
- Wimbledon: 2R (1930, 1932)

Doubles

Grand Slam doubles results
- Wimbledon: QF (1933)

Grand Slam mixed doubles results
- Wimbledon: 2R (1932, 1933, 1934)

Irving Horace "Laddie" Wheatcroft (1904–1967) was a British–American amateur tennis player.

Wheatcroft was born in the eponymous Wheatcroft, Kentucky, named after his father, a British magnate who built the community's railroad line. Educated in England, Wheatcroft attended the University of Cambridge, from where he was a tennis blue and graduated in 1927.

Standing at 6 ft 5 in, Wheatcroft possessed a powerful serve and featured in several editions of the Wimbledon Championships, making the quarter-finals of the men's doubles event in 1933. He married fellow tennis player Christabel Hardie and the pair often competed together in mixed doubles.

Wheatcroft returned to the United States just before the outbreak of World War II, settling with his wife in New York. He became a well known player and instructor of contract bridge, with the American Contract Bridge League granting him their highest possible status of "life master".
