= 1933 Wimbledon Championships – Women's doubles =

Women's doubles
- 1933 Wimbledon Championships

Final
- Champions: (France) Simonne Mathieu (United States) Elizabeth Ryan
- Runners-up: (United Kingdom) Freda James (United Kingdom) Billie Yorke
- Score: 6–2, 9–11, 6–4

Details
- Draw: 48 (5Q)
- Seeds: 4

Events
Singles	men	women		boys	girls
Doubles	men	women	mixed	boys	girls
- Wimbledon Championships

Doris Metaxa and Josane Sigart were the defending champions, but Metaxa did not compete. Sigart partnered with Peggy Scriven, but lost in the third round to Kitty Godfree and Peggy Michell.

Simonne Mathieu and Elizabeth Ryan defeated Freda James and Billie Yorke in the final, 6–2, 9–11, 6–4 to win the ladies' doubles tennis title at the 1933 Wimbledon Championships.

== Seeds ==
1. (France) Simonne Mathieu / (United States) Elizabeth Ryan (champions)
2. (United Kingdom) Mary Heeley / (United Kingdom) Dorothy Round (quarterfinals)
3. (United Kingdom) Peggy Scriven / (Belgium) Josane Sigart (third round)
4. (United Kingdom) Eileen Fearnley-Whittingstall / (United States) Betty Nuthall (quarterfinals)

Click on the seed number of a player to go to their draw section.

== Draw ==
Key

- Q = Qualifier
- WC = Wild card
- LL = Lucky loser
- Alt = Alternate
- ITF = ITF entry
- PR = Protected ranking
- SR = Special ranking
- SE = Special exempt
- JE = Junior exempt
- JR = Junior Accelerator Programme entrant
- CO = College Accelerator Programme entrant
- NG = Next Gen Accelerator Program entrant
- w/o = Walkover
- r = Retired
- d = Defaulted

=== Finals ===
Quarterfinals
2	(United Kingdom) Mary Heeley (United Kingdom) Dorothy Round	1	6
(United Kingdom) Freda James (United Kingdom) Billie Yorke	6	8
(United Kingdom) Kitty Godfree (United Kingdom) Peggy Michell	6	9
(United States) Dorothy Burke (United Kingdom) MA Thomas	3	7
(United Kingdom) Elsie Pittman (United Kingdom) Joan Ridley	6	8	6
4	(United Kingdom) Eileen Fearnley-Whittingstall (United Kingdom) Betty Nuthall	8	6	1
(Poland) Jadwiga Jędrzejowska (United Kingdom) Kay Stammers	1	2
1	(France) Simonne Mathieu (United States) Elizabeth Ryan	6	6

Semifinals
(United Kingdom) Freda James (United Kingdom) Billie Yorke	5	6	6
(United Kingdom) Kitty Godfree (United Kingdom) Peggy Michell	7	0	4
(United Kingdom) Elsie Pittman (United Kingdom) Joan Ridley	1	6	4
1	(France) Simonne Mathieu (United States) Elizabeth Ryan	6	4	6

Final
(United Kingdom) Freda James (United Kingdom) Billie Yorke	2	11	4
1	(France) Simonne Mathieu (United States) Elizabeth Ryan	6	9	6

=== Top half ===
==== Section 1 ====
First round

Second round
2	(United Kingdom) Mary Heeley (United Kingdom) Dorothy Round	1	6	6
(United States) Helen Jacobs (United Kingdom) Phyllis King	6	1	2
(France) Sylvie Henrotin (France) Colette Rosambert	9	8
Q	(United Kingdom) Dorothy Crichton (United Kingdom) Madie Moss	7	6
(United Kingdom) Helen Dyson (United Kingdom) Jeanette Morfey	2	2
(United Kingdom) Freda James (United Kingdom) Billie Yorke	6	6
(Netherlands) Madzy Couquerque (Italy) Lucia Valerio	4	6	6
(United Kingdom) Mie Johnstone (United Kingdom) Lucy Pennycuick	6	3	1

Third round
2	(United Kingdom) M Heeley (United Kingdom) D Round	6	6
(France) S Henrotin (France) C Rosambert	4	4
(United Kingdom) W James (United Kingdom) A Yorke	6	6
(Netherlands) M Couquerque (Italy) L Valerio	3	4

Quarterfinals
2	(United Kingdom) M Heeley (United Kingdom) D Round	1	6
(United Kingdom) W James (United Kingdom) A Yorke	6	8

==== Section 2 ====
First round
3	(United Kingdom) Margaret Scriven (Belgium) Josane Sigart	7	6
(United Kingdom) Beatrice Feltham (United Kingdom) Susan Noel	5	0
(Germany) Marie Horn (Germany) Marga von Ende-Pflügner	6	6
(United Kingdom) Nora Martin (United Kingdom) Gladys Southwell	2	1
(United Kingdom) Kitty Godfree (United Kingdom) Peggy Michell	6	6
(United Kingdom) Winifred Beamish (United Kingdom) Joy Cunningham	2	2
(France) Lucette Caron Culbert (France) Elizabeth Macready	2	4
(United Kingdom) Elsa Haylock (Greece) Helene Nicolopoulos	6	6
(Belgium) Nelly Adamson (United Kingdom) Marjorie Stork	2	5
(United States) Dorothy Burke (United Kingdom) MA Thomas	6	7
(United Kingdom) MK Phayre (United Kingdom) Olga Webb	5	7	6
(United Kingdom) Mary Burgess-Smith (United Kingdom) Jean Saunders	7	5	1
(United Kingdom) Naomi Trentham (United Kingdom) Helen Turnbull	2	3
(United Kingdom) Evelyn Dearman (United Kingdom) Nancy Lyle	6	6
(United Kingdom) Cecily Marriott (United Kingdom) Madge Slaney	0	3
(United Kingdom) Mary Knapp (United Kingdom) Violet Owen	6	6

Second round
3	(United Kingdom) M Scriven (Belgium) J Sigart	6	10
(Germany) M Horn (Germany) M von Ende-Pflügner	3	8
(United Kingdom) K Godfree (United Kingdom) M Michell	6	6
(United Kingdom) E Haylock (Greece) H Nicolopoulos	2	3
(United States) D Burke (United Kingdom) MA Thomas	6	6
(United Kingdom) MK Phayre (United Kingdom) O Webb	2	3
(United Kingdom) E Dearman (United Kingdom) N Lyle	8	8
(United Kingdom) M Knapp (United Kingdom) V Owen	6	6

Third round
3	(United Kingdom) M Scriven (Belgium) J Sigart	5	5
(United Kingdom) K Godfree (United Kingdom) M Michell	7	7
(United States) D Burke (United Kingdom) MA Thomas	9	6
(United Kingdom) E Dearman (United Kingdom) N Lyle	7	4

Quarterfinals
(United Kingdom) K Godfree (United Kingdom) M Michell	6	9
(United States) D Burke (United Kingdom) MA Thomas	3	7

=== Bottom half ===
==== Section 3 ====
First round
(Spain) Bella Pons (United Kingdom) Phyllis Satterthwaite	1	7	4
LL	(United Kingdom) Joan Ingram (United Kingdom) Peggy Pleydell-Bouverie	6	5	6
(United Kingdom) Patricia Brazier (United Kingdom) Christabel Wheatcroft	11	5	5
(United Kingdom) Mildred Nonweiler (United Kingdom) Betty Soames	9	7	7
(France) Jacqueline Gallay (France) Jacqueline Goldschmidt	6	6
Q	(United Kingdom) Barbara Drew (United Kingdom) Molly Hargreaves	4	1
(United Kingdom) Dorothy Hill (United Kingdom) Joan Strawson	2	1
(United Kingdom) Elsie Pittman (United Kingdom) Joan Ridley	6	6
(United Kingdom) Gethyn Harry (United Kingdom) JF Harry	0	6	3
(United Kingdom) Sybil Edwards (United Kingdom) Betty Uber	6	4	6
(United Kingdom) Florence Ford (United Kingdom) Andree Lucas	4	1
Q	(United Kingdom) Gladys Clarke-Jervoise (United Kingdom) Joan Couchman	6	6
Q	(United Kingdom) Betty Boas; PJE Cargill	2	6	2
(United Kingdom) Winifred Bower (Germany) Hilde Krahwinkel	6	4	6
(United Kingdom) Phyllis Covell (United Kingdom) Dorothy Shepherd-Barron	0	6
4	(United Kingdom) Eileen Fearnley-Whittingstall (United Kingdom) Betty Nuthall	6	8

Second round
LL	(United Kingdom) J Ingram (United Kingdom) M Pleydell-Bouverie	6	6
(United Kingdom) P Brazier (United Kingdom) C Wheatcroft	1	1
(France) J Gallay (France) J Goldschmidt	2	4
(United Kingdom) E Pittman (United Kingdom) J Ridley	6	6
(United Kingdom) S Edwards (United Kingdom) E Uber	7	7
Q	(United Kingdom) G Clarke-Jervoise (United Kingdom) J Couchman	5	5
(United Kingdom) W Bower (Germany) H Krahwinkel	1	4
4	(United Kingdom) E Fearnley-Whittingstall (United Kingdom) B Nuthall	6	6

Third round
LL	(United Kingdom) J Ingram (United Kingdom) M Pleydell-Bouverie	3	2
(United Kingdom) E Pittman (United Kingdom) J Ridley	6	6
(United Kingdom) S Edwards (United Kingdom) E Uber	6	2
4	(United Kingdom) E Fearnley-Whittingstall (United Kingdom) B Nuthall	8	6

Quarterfinals
(United Kingdom) E Pittman (United Kingdom) J Ridley	6	8	6
4	(United Kingdom) E Fearnley-Whittingstall (United Kingdom) B Nuthall	8	6	1

The nationality of PJE Cargill is unknown.

==== Section 4 ====
First round

Second round
(Poland) Jadwiga Jędrzejowska (United Kingdom) Kay Stammers	6	6
(United Kingdom) Vera Montgomery (United States) Virginia Rice	1	2
(United Kingdom) Margaret Mellows (United Kingdom) Margaret Stocks	3	6	6
(United Kingdom) JL Seymour (United Kingdom) Daphne White	6	4	4
(United Kingdom) Ermyntrude Harvey (United Kingdom) Phoebe Watson	6	6
Q	Mrs BV Bouch (United Kingdom) Vere King	1	0
(United Kingdom) Mary Hardwick (United Kingdom) Effie Peters	1	0
1	(France) Simonne Mathieu (United States) Elizabeth Ryan	6	6

Third round
(Poland) J Jędrzejowska (United Kingdom) K Stammers	6	7
(United Kingdom) M Mellows (United Kingdom) M Stocks	1	5
(United Kingdom) E Harvey (United Kingdom) P Watson	2	2
1	(France) S Mathieu (United States) EM Ryan	6	6

Quarterfinals
(Poland) J Jędrzejowska (United Kingdom) K Stammers	1	2
1	(France) S Mathieu (United States) E Ryan	6	6

The nationality of Mrs BV Bouch is unknown.
