= Buster Andrews =

New Zealand tennis player

- Full name: Eskell Dundas Andrews
- Country (sports): NZL
- Born: 31 July 1905 Shannon, New Zealand
- Died: 1981 (age 76) London, England
- Turned pro: 1921 (amateur tour)
- Retired: 1949

Singles
- Career titles: 19

Grand Slam singles results
- French Open: 2R (1929, 1934)
- Wimbledon: 4R (1930, 1935)
- US Open: 2R (1935)

Grand Slam doubles results
- Wimbledon: QF (1933, (1935)

Grand Slam mixed doubles results
- Wimbledon: QF (1932)

Eskell Dundas (Buster) Andrews (31 July 1905 – 1981) was a former New Zealand tennis player who later became a solicitor and a partner in a London stockbroking firm. He competed at the Wimbledon Championships thirteen times between 1928 and 1949. He was a two time quarter finalist in the men's doubles, and quarter finalist in the mixed doubles. He was active from 1921 to 1949 and won 19 career singles titles.

== Tennis career ==
Andrews was born in 1905 in Shannon, New Zealand. In 1917 at the age of 12 he attended Palmerston North Boys High School for the next five years, where he developed an aptitude for tennis. In 1921 at the age of 16 he played his first senior tennis event at the New Zealand Championships where he lost in the second round. From 1921 until 1926 he predominantly played tournaments in Australia and New Zealand.

In 1926 Andrews won his first senior tour tournament at the New Zealand Championships against Dick North, the same year he also reached the finals of the New South Wales Championships where he lost to Fred Kalms. In 1927 Buster moved to England to study law at Cambridge. In 1928 he played at his first Wimbledon Championships where he caused a sensation by defeating the American No 4 Seed Frank Hunter in five sets, before losing in the next round.

In major tournaments he reached the fourth round in the men's singles at Wimbledon twice in 1930 where he lost to Bill Tilden and in 1935 when he was beaten by Bunny Austin. He was somewhat more successful in the men's doubles event reaching the quarter-finals twice in 1933, then partnering Alan Steadman when they lost to the German pairing of Gottfried von Cramm and Eberhard Nourney and in 1935 when he partnered with Ireland's George Lyttleton-Rogers, but we're defeated by the British team of Pat Hughes and Raymond Tuckey. In the mixed doubles in 1932 he reached the quarter-finals stage partnered with Britain's Kay Stammers, but they were beaten by the French British pairing of Henri Cochet and Eileen Fearnley Whittingstall.

At the French Championships in the men's singles event he twice reached the second round in 1929 losing to René Lacoste and 1934 where he lost to Antoine Gentien. In 1935 he was seeded 14th at U.S. National Championships, but was beaten by Martin Buxby in five sets in the second round.

His other career singles highlights include winning the, New Zealand Championships two times (1926, 1932), the North of England Championships two times (1928, 1930), the Hampshire Championships two times (1928, 1930), the Northumberland Championships (1928), the Henley Hard Courts spring meeting (1929), the South of England Championships (1929), the Western India Championships (1930), the Gleneagles Hard Court Championships (1931), the Northern Championships (1932), the Priory Whitsun Lawn Tennis Tournament (1932), the Ceylon Championships (1933), the Auckland Championships (1934), the Norfolk Championships (1934), St George's Hill Open (1935) and the Surrey Championships (1935).

In addition, he was also a finalist at the Surrey Hard Court Championships (1928), the Juan-les-Pins Championship in France (1928), the Indian International Championships at Calcutta (1930) and the Kent Championships (1932). In 1936 he won his final tournament at the Scottish Hard Court Championships at St. Andrews against Ian Collins. In 1946 he played his final singles tournament at the Wimbledon Championships. and a mixed doubles event at the 1949 Wimbledon Championships.

Andrews was regarded as New Zealand's best player since Tony Wilding between World Wars I and II.

== Family ==
He was the son of Oscar Andrews and had two brothers. In March 1937 in London he married the daughter of an oil industrialist Miss Yoma Hamilton Watson at St. Trinity's Church. They had two children before divorcing in May 1950 and finalised in February 1954. Andrews later remarried. He died in London, England in 1981.

== Education ==
Buster attended Palmerston North Boys’ High School, Palmerston North, New Zealand between 1917 and 1922, he won the school tennis championship three times between (1920–1922). Whilst at Palmerston he won the New Zealand Junior Championships twice. When he left school he balanced his tennis whilst undertaking law studies, and took a work placement with the law firm Hankins, Fitzherbert and Abraham, today called Fitzherbert Rowe. In 1927 he moved England to study law at Cambridge. Whilst studying at Cambridge he also worked as a junior solicitor.

== Work ==
In 1930 on leaving university he became a director of Spaldings the job entailed lots of international travel. He qualified as a solicitor and eventually became a partner at a stockbrocking firm and member of London Stock Exchange, London, England.
