= Wheatcroft, Kentucky =

- City
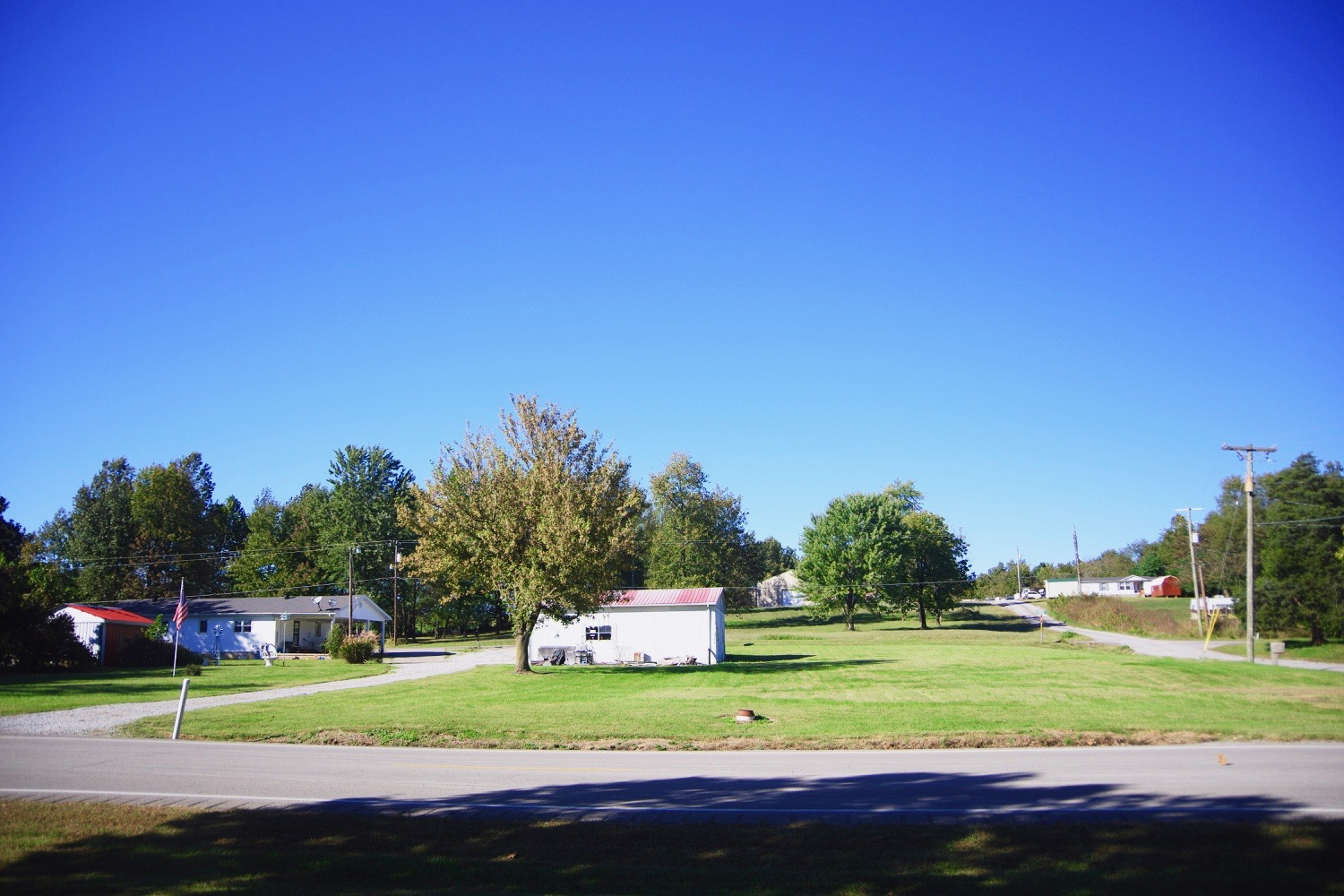
- Houses in Wheatcroft

- Location of Wheatcroft in Webster County, Kentucky.
- Coordinates: 37°29′20″N 87°51′48″W
- Country: United States
- State: Kentucky
- County: Webster

Area
  - Total: 0.25 sq mi (0.64 km^{2})
  - Land: 0.25 sq mi (0.64 km^{2})
  - Water: 0 sq mi (0.00 km^{2})
- Elevation: 377 ft (115 m)

Population (2020)
  - Total: 105
  - Density: 427.5/sq mi (165.04/km^{2})
- Time zone: UTC-6 (Central (CST))
  - Summer (DST): UTC-5 (CDT)
- ZIP code: 42463
- Area code: 270
- FIPS code: 21-82200
- GNIS feature ID: 0506516

Wheatcroft is a home rule-class city in Webster County, Kentucky, United States. As of the 2020 census, Wheatcroft had a population of 105.

== History ==
Wheatcroft was named for Irving Horace Wheatcroft, an Englishman, who in 1899 laid out and founded the city on land acquired from Elijah Cullen. He opened one or more area coal mines, and built the Kentucky Western Railway from nearby Blackford to Dixon. The Wheatcroft post office was established on September 10, 1900, with A.S. Logsdon as postmaster. The city incorporated in 1902.

== Geography ==
Wheatcroft is located at 37°29′20″N 87°51′48″W (37.489016, -87.863276). The city lies along Kentucky Route 109 northwest of Clay and southeast of the Webster-Union county line.

According to the United States Census Bureau, the city has a total area of 0.2 square miles (0.52 km^{2}), all land.

== Demographics ==
Historical population
| Census | Pop. | Note | %± |
|---|---|---|---|
| 1910 | 490 | | — |
| 1920 | 400 | | −18.4% |
| 1930 | 705 | | 76.3% |
| 1940 | 617 | | −12.5% |
| 1950 | 418 | | −32.3% |
| 1960 | 317 | | −24.2% |
| 1970 | 229 | | −27.8% |
| 1980 | 325 | | 41.9% |
| 1990 | 206 | | −36.6% |
| 2000 | 173 | | −16.0% |
| 2010 | 160 | | −7.5% |
| 2020 | 105 | | −34.4% |
U.S. Decennial Census

As of the census of 2000, there were 173 people, 68 households, and 49 families residing in the city. The population density was 698.5 inhabitants per square mile (269.7/km^{2}). There were 84 housing units at an average density of 339.1 per square mile (130.9/km^{2}). The racial makeup of the city was 100.00% White.

There were 63 households, out of which 27.9% had children under the age of 18 living with them, 50.0% were married couples living together, 14.7% had a female householder with no husband present, and 26.5% were non-families. 25.0% of all households were made up of individuals, and 11.8% had someone living alone who was 65 years of age or older. The average household size was 2.54 and the average family size was 2.98.

In the city, the population was spread out, with 25.4% under the age of 18, 8.7% from 18 to 24, 28.3% from 25 to 44, 25.4% from 45 to 64, and 12.1% who were 65 years of age or older. The median age was 38 years. For every 100 females, there were 121.8 males. For every 100 females age 18 and over, there were 111.5 males.

The median income for a household in the city was $32,917, and the median income for a family was $29,583. Males had a median income of $27,000 versus $23,125 for females. The per capita income for the city was $12,643. About 17.0% of families and 18.7% of the population were below the poverty line, including 25.8% of those under the age of eighteen and 20.0% of those 65 or over.
