= 1933 Wimbledon Championships =

- Date: 26 June – 8 July
- Edition: 53rd
- Category: Grand Slam
- Surface: Grass
- Location: Church Road; SW19, Wimbledon, London, United Kingdom
- Venue: All England Lawn Tennis and Croquet Club

Champions

Men's singles
- (Australia) Jack Crawford

Women's singles
- (United States) Helen Moody

Men's doubles
- (France) Jean Borotra / (France) Jacques Brugnon

Women's doubles
- (France) Simonne Mathieu / (United States) Elizabeth Ryan

Mixed doubles
- (Germany) Gottfried von Cramm / (Germany) Hilde Krahwinkel
| ← 1932 · | Wimbledon Championships | · 1934 → |

The 1933 Wimbledon Championships took place on the outdoor grass courts at the All England Lawn Tennis and Croquet Club in Wimbledon, London, United Kingdom. The tournament was held from Monday 26 June until Saturday 8 July 1933. It was the 53rd staging of the Wimbledon Championships, and the third Grand Slam tennis event of 1933. Jack Crawford and Helen Moody won the singles titles.

== Finals ==
=== Men's singles ===
(Australia) Jack Crawford defeated (United States) Ellsworth Vines, 4–6, 11–9, 6–2, 2–6, 6–4

=== Women's singles ===
(United States) Helen Moody defeated (United Kingdom) Dorothy Round, 6–4, 6–8, 6–3

=== Men's doubles ===
(France) Jean Borotra / (France) Jacques Brugnon defeated (Japan) Ryosuke Nunoi / (Japan) Jiro Sato, 4–6, 6–3, 6–3, 7–5

=== Women's doubles ===
(France) Simonne Mathieu / (United States) Elizabeth Ryan defeated (United Kingdom) Freda James / (United Kingdom) Billie Yorke, 6–2, 9–11, 6–4

=== Mixed doubles ===
(Germany) Gottfried von Cramm / (Germany) Hilde Krahwinkel defeated (South Africa) Norman Farquharson / (United Kingdom) Mary Heeley, 7–5, 8–6

| Preceded by 1933 French Championships | Grand Slams | Succeeded by 1933 U.S. National Championships |
