= Eberhard Nourney =

German tennis player

- Country (sports): Germany
- Born: 23 April 1904; Cologne, Germany
- Died: 31 July 1936 (aged 32); Brunshaupten, Germany

Singles

Grand Slam singles results
- French Open: 2R (1930)
- Wimbledon: 3R (1931)

Doubles

Grand Slam doubles results
- Wimbledon: SF (1933)

Wilhelm Otto "Eberhard" Nourney (23 April 1904 – 31 July 1936) was a tennis player from Germany.

== Career ==
Nourney competed in 1929 Wimbledon Championships but was eliminated in the opening round, by Colin Robbins of South Africa.

The German also failed to register a win at the 1930 French Championships, losing to second seed Bill Tilden in the second round, having received a bye in the first.

In the 1931 Wimbledon Championships, Nourney made it into the third round, with wins over Denmark's Helge Plougmann and Dutch player Josef Knottenbelt. He lost in the third round to eventual finalist Frank Shields. Later that year, Nourney won the men's doubles title at the German Championships, with Walter Dessart as his partner.

Nourney was beaten by David Williams, a local, in the first round of the 1933 Wimbledon Championships but did manage to reach the doubles semi-finals, partnering Gottfried von Cramm.

He represented Germany in eight International Lawn Tennis Challenge ties during his career, the first in 1931 and last in 1934. From his 13 rubbers he had seven wins, three in singles and four in doubles.

== Death ==
Nourney died of heart disease in 1936 at the age of 32.
