= Emanuele Sertorio =

Italian tennis player

- Country (sports): Italy
- Born: 1902; Genoa, Italy
- Died: 26 April 1991
- Plays: Right-handed

Singles

Grand Slam singles results
- French Open: 3R (1932)
- Wimbledon: 2R (1933, 1934)

Emanuele Sertorio (1902 – 26 April 1991) was an Italian tennis player of the 1920s and 1930s.

Born in Genoa, Sertorio was associated with the Juventus Tennis Club in Turin and won the singles title at the 1928 Italian national championships. In 1933 he became the first local player to claim the Italian International Championships and defeated Frenchman André Martin-Legeay in the final, having earlier beaten Franjo Punčec. He was a Davis Cup player for Italy in 1932 and 1934, securing two doubles wins.

== See also ==
- List of Italy Davis Cup team representatives
