= Kay Lund =

German tennis player (1912–1979)

- Country (sports): Germany
- Born: 21 January 1912
- Died: 3 September 1979 (aged 67)

Singles

Grand Slam singles results
- French Open: 3R (1936)
- Wimbledon: 3R (1933)

Kay Lund (21 January 1912 – 3 September 1979) was a German tennis player of the 1930s.

A native of Kiel, Lund was a two-time German junior champion who played Davis Cup doubles for Germany in 1935 and 1936. In the 1935 Inter-Zonal final against the United States, he and Gottfried von Cramm held five match points in their loss to Wilmer Allison and John Van Ryn, which would have given Germany a 2–1 lead in the tie.

Lund was badly injured in World War II, losing an arm and leg. No longer able to play tennis, Lund received assistance from his former doubles partner and long time friend von Cramm, who bought him a hotel in Baden Baden.

== See also ==
- List of Germany Davis Cup team representatives
