= Josef Knottenbelt =

Dutch tennis player (1910–1998)

- Full name: Joannes Henricus Knottenbelt
- Native name: Joop Knottenbelt
- Country (sports): Netherlands
- Born: 25 October 1910 Lhokseumawe, Sumatra
- Died: 26 February 1998 (aged 87) Altea, Spain

Grand Slam singles results
- Wimbledon: 2R (1931)

Grand Slam doubles results
- Wimbledon: 2R (1931)

Grand Slam mixed doubles results
- Wimbledon: 4R (1932)

Joannes Henricus "Joop" Knottenbelt internationally known as Josef Knottenbelt (1910 – 1998) was a Dutch tennis player. He was a member of the Netherlands Davis Cup team with among others Henk Timmer.

In 1927 he won the Dutch youth (under 18) championships. In 1931, Knottenbelt reached the second round of the men's singles at Wimbledon, losing to Eberhard Nourney of Germany, 8–10 6–2, 0–6 9–11. In the 1932 Wimbledon mixed doubles, he and Madzy Rollin Couquerque lost in the fourth round to Ellsworth Vines and Helen Wills-Moody.

In the quarterfinals of the 1934 Davis Cup, he lost to Swedes Curt Östberg (1–6, 1–6, 4–6) and Kalle Schröder (1–6, 5–7, 0–6) although the Netherlands won the round.

Knottenbelt was born in the Dutch East Indies but grew up in Bussum. His younger brother Anthony Knottenbelt was also a promising tennis player, but died at the age of 19 after an accident. In September 1937 Knottenbelt left again for the Dutch East Indies.
