= Colin Robbins (tennis) =

South African tennis player

- Full name: Colin John James Robbins
- Country (sports): South Africa
- Born: 5 February 1905; Natal, South Africa
- Plays: Left-handed

Singles

Grand Slam singles results
- French Open: 4R (1933)
- Wimbledon: 3R (1933)

Colin John James Robbins (born 5 February 1905) was a South African tennis player.

Robbins, a native of Natal, was the son of Bristol-born William Clark Robbins.

An attorney by profession, Robbins was a two-time national champion who competed for the South Africa Davis Cup team in 1929 and 1933, winning four singles rubbers. In those years he also featured at the Wimbledon Championships and made the third round in 1933. He reached the fourth round of the 1933 French Championships, where he was beaten in five sets by Jiro Sato.

Robbins, who played left-handed, was affectionately referred to as the robot of the South African team for his tireless play and ball retrieval abilities.

His wife was tennis player Billie Tapscott.

== See also ==
- List of South Africa Davis Cup team representatives
