= Pat Hughes (tennis) =

English tennis player (1902–97)

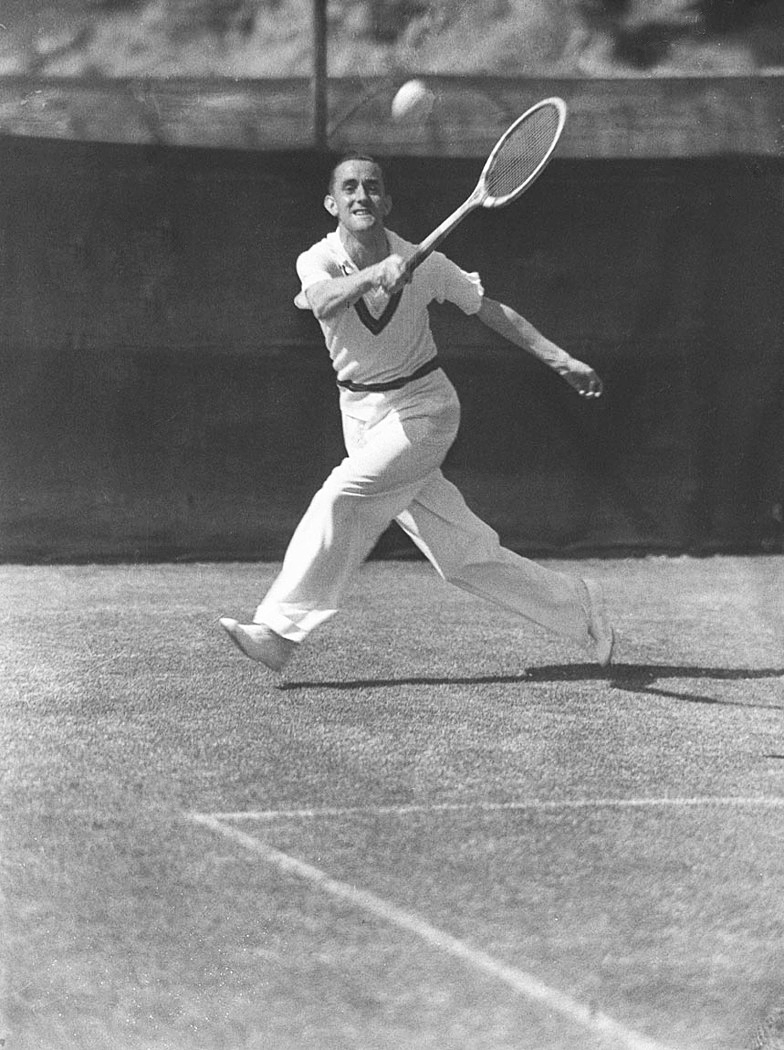
- Hughes in 1934
- Full name: George Patrick Hughes
- Country (sports): United Kingdom
- Born: 21 December 1902 Sutton Coldfield, England
- Died: 8 May 1997 (aged 94) Walton-on-Thames, England
- Turned pro: 1926 (amateur tour)
- Retired: 1941
- Plays: Right-handed (one-handed backhand)

Singles
- Career record: 384–126
- Career titles: 35

Grand Slam singles results
- Australian Open: QF (1934)
- French Open: SF (1931)
- Wimbledon: QF (1931, 1933)
- US Open: 2R (1931)

Grand Slam doubles results
- Australian Open: W (1934)
- French Open: W (1933)
- Wimbledon: W (1936)

Grand Slam mixed doubles results
- Wimbledon: QF (1926, 1933)

Team competitions
- Davis Cup: W (1933, 1934, 1935, 1936)

George Patrick Hughes (21 December 1902 – 8 May 1997) was an English tennis player.

Hughes and Fred Perry won the doubles at the French Championships in 1933 and at the Australian Championships in 1934. Hughes later teamed up with Raymond Tuckey. They won the doubles in Wimbledon in 1936. Hughes reached the semi-finals at Roland Garros in 1931, where he beat Vernon Kirby and George Lott before losing to Christian Boussus. Between 1929 and 1936 Hughes was a member of the British Davis Cup team.

Hughes had been the only British man to reach the singles final at the Italian championships, capturing the title in 1931 and runner-up the following year, until Andy Murray won the tournament in 2016. Hughes captured the doubles title in both those years too, when the tournament, in its infancy, was played in Milan.

He was the editor of the Dunlop Lawn Tennis Annual and Almanack from the late 1940s to the late 1950s.

He worked for years in London as the Vice President of Dunlop Sporting Goods World Wide.

== Grand Slam finals ==
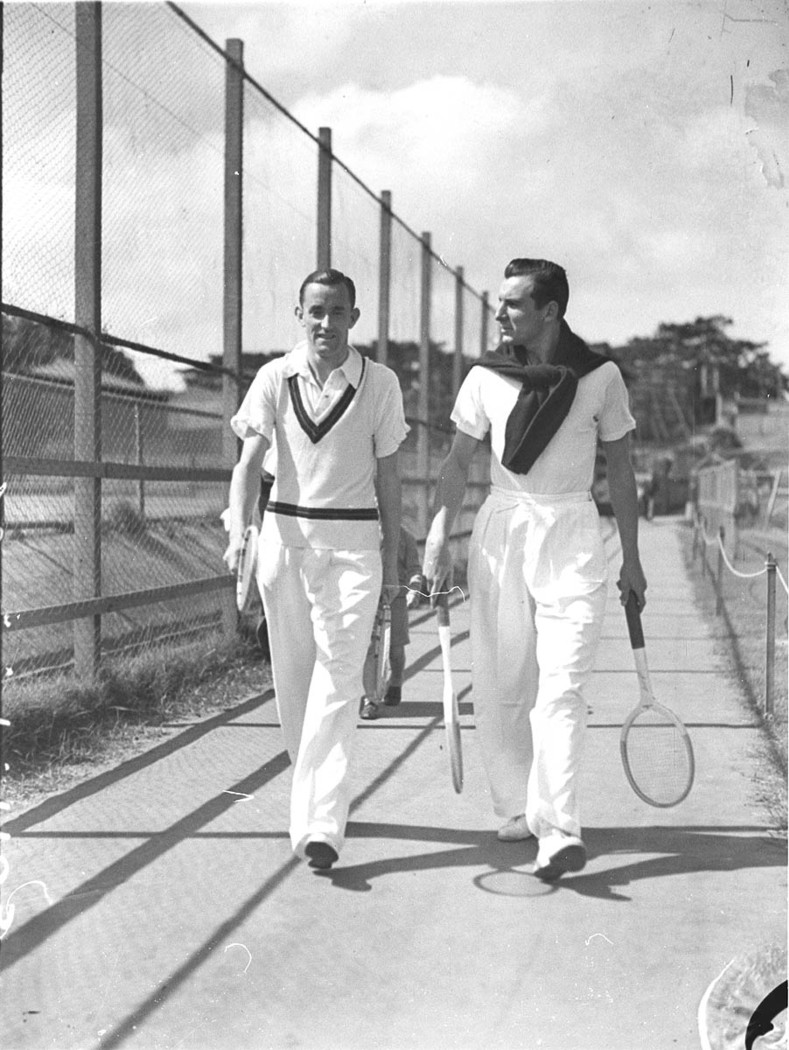
Pat Hughes left and Fred Perry at White City in the 1934-1935 summer before the January 1935 Melbourne Centenary Australian Championships at Kooyong

=== Doubles (3 titles, 4 runner-ups) ===
Result	Year	Championship	Surface	Partner	Opponents	Score
Loss	1932	Wimbledon	Grass	(United Kingdom) Fred Perry	(France) Jean Borotra (France) Jacques Brugnon	0–6, 6–4, 6–3, 5–7, 5–7
Win	1933	French Championships	Clay	(United Kingdom) Fred Perry	(Australia) Adrian Quist (Australia) Viv McGrath	6–2, 6–4, 2–6, 7–5
Win	1934	Australian Championships	Grass	(United Kingdom) Fred Perry	(Australia) Adrian Quist (Australia) Don Turnbull	6–8, 6–3, 6–4, 3–6, 6–3
Loss	1935	Australian Championships	Grass	(United Kingdom) Fred Perry	(Australia) Jack Crawford (Australia) Vivian McGrath	4–6, 6–8, 2–6
Loss	1936	French Championships	Clay	(United Kingdom) Charles Tuckey	(France) Jean Borotra (France) Marcel Bernard	2–6, 6–3, 7–9, 1–6
Win	1936	Wimbledon	Grass	(United Kingdom) Charles Tuckey	(United Kingdom) Charles Hare (United Kingdom) Frank Wilde	6–4, 3–6, 7–9, 6–1, 6–4
Loss	1937	Wimbledon	Grass	(United Kingdom) Charles Tuckey	(United States) Don Budge (United States) Gene Mako	0–6, 4–6, 8–6, 1–6
