= Frank Wilde =

British tennis player

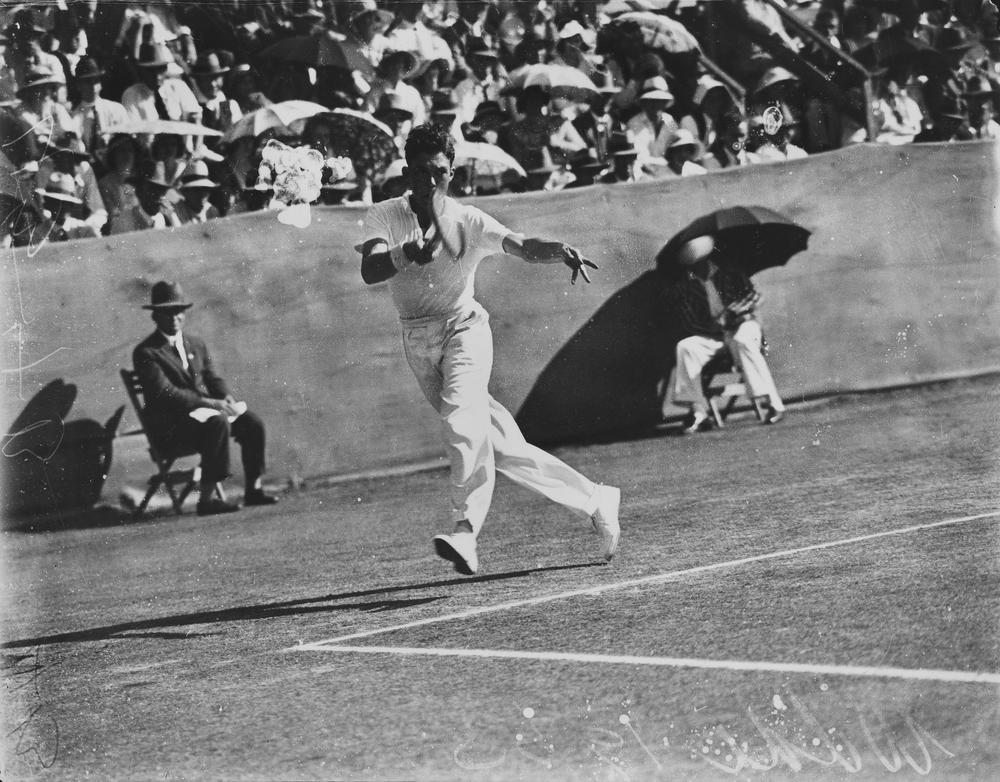
- Wilde in 1933
- Full name: Frank Herbert David Wilde
- Country (sports): United Kingdom
- Born: 1 March 1911 Wimbledon, England
- Died: 6 February 1982 (aged 70) Eastergate, England

Singles

Grand Slam singles results
- Australian Open: 3R (1934)
- French Open: 4R (1933)
- Wimbledon: 3R (1932)
- US Open: 3R (1933, 1934)

Doubles

Grand Slam doubles results
- Wimbledon: F (1936, 1939)

Grand Slam mixed doubles results
- Wimbledon: F (1939)

Frank Herbert David Wilde (1 March 1911 – 6 February 1982) was a British tennis and table tennis player who played in the Davis Cup. He reached the final of the Wimbledon Championships on three occasions, twice in the men's doubles and once in mixed doubles.

== Biography ==
Wilde was born in Wimbledon, London on 1 March 1911.

== Tennis career ==
A right-handed player, Wilde represented Great Britain in the Davis Cup from 1937 to 1939. He featured mostly in doubles rubbers, of which he won two out of six. One of the four losses was in the final of the 1937 tournament, against the United States in London, partnering Raymond Tuckey. The British, who had won the last four titles, lost the tie 1-4.

The first of his Wimbledon finals was in 1936 when he and partner Charles Hare lost a five set final. At the 1939 Wimbledon Championships he again finished runner up with Hare and also lost the mixed doubles final, with Nina Brown.

As a singles player his best Grand Slam performance was a fourth round appearance at the 1933 French Championships. He won the All England Plate in 1933.

His career was interrupted by World War II, after his success at Wimbledon in 1939 he didn't reappear at the tournament until 1946.

=== Grand Slam finals ===
==== Doubles (2 runner-ups) ====
Result	Year	Championship	Surface	Partner	Opponents	Score
Loss	1936	Wimbledon	Grass	(United Kingdom) Charles Hare	(United Kingdom) Pat Hughes (United Kingdom) Raymond Tuckey	4–6, 6–3, 9–7, 1–6, 4–6
Loss	1939	Wimbledon	Grass	(United Kingdom) Charles Hare	(United States) Elwood Cooke (United States) Bobby Riggs	3–6, 6–3, 3–6, 7–9

==== Mixed doubles (1 runner-up) ====
Result	Year	Championship	Surface	Partner	Opponents	Score
Loss	1939	Wimbledon	Grass	(United Kingdom) Nina Brown	(United States) Bobby Riggs (United States) Alice Marble	7–9, 1–6

== Table tennis career ==
Wilde was part of the England team that won a bronze medal in the men's team event at the 1929 World Table Tennis Championships. The team included Fred Perry.

== See also ==
- List of Great Britain Davis Cup team representatives
- List of England players at the World Team Table Tennis Championships
