= Eric Peters (tennis) =

British tennis player

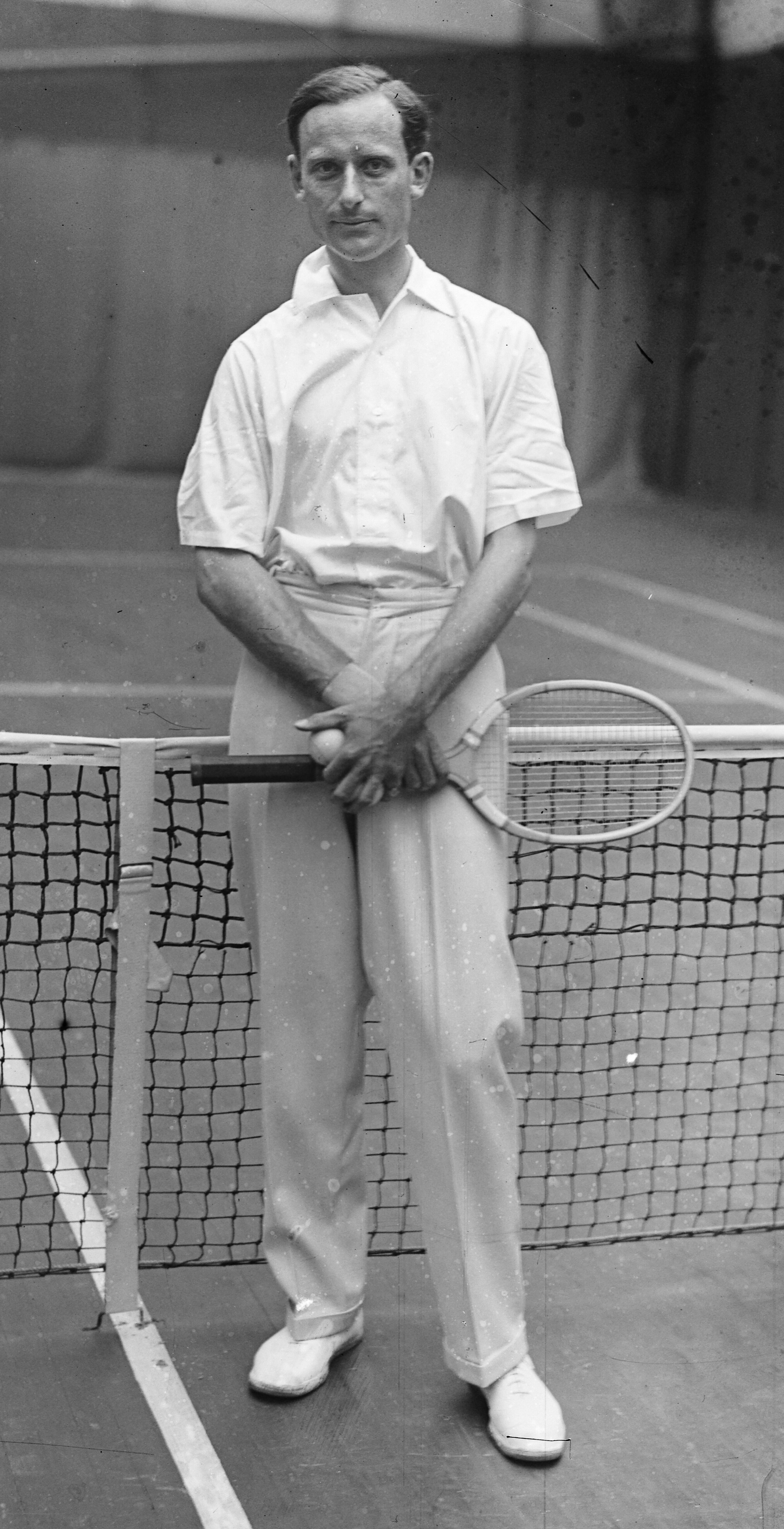
- Full name: Eric Conrad Peters
- Country (sports): Great Britain
- Born: 10 August 1903
- Died: 28 December 1985 (aged 82)

Singles

Grand Slam singles results
- Wimbledon: 3R (1932)

Doubles

Grand Slam doubles results
- Wimbledon: 3R (1932)

Grand Slam mixed doubles results
- Wimbledon: QF (1930)

Eric Conrad Peters (10 August 1903 – 28 December 1985) was a British tennis player.

An Oxford graduate, Peters played a patient, defensive brand of tennis. He was active in the late 1920s to 1930s, and was featured regularly at Wimbledon. He made the mixed doubles quarter-finals of the 1930 Wimbledon Championships with Elsie Pittman. His most famous victory was over Bill Tilden at Cannes in 1930, becoming the first British amateur to defeat the American. He also had a career win over Bunny Austin and once took Jean Borotra to five sets.

Peters, who was involved in his family's brewery business, married tennis player Effie Hemmant in 1932.
