= Ted Avory =

British tennis player (1909–1995)

- Full name: Edward Raymond Avory
- Country (sports): Great Britain
- Born: 21 June 1909; Paddington, London, England
- Died: 26 October 1995 (aged 86); Surrey, England

Singles

Grand Slam singles results
- French Open: 2R (1932, 1938)
- Wimbledon: 3R (1932, 1934, 1936, 1937, 1938)
- US Open: 4R (1932)

Edward Raymond Avory (21 June 1909 – 26 October 1995) was a British tennis player.

Born in London, Avory was educated at Stowe School. He was a great-nephew of High Court judge Sir Horace Avory. Most active in tennis during the 1930s, he made regular appearances at Wimbledon in this period and also reached the singles fourth round of the 1932 U.S. National Championships. His career titles include the Kent Championships, Middlesex Championships, Scottish Championships and St George's Hill Tournament.

Avory became chairman of the Lawn Tennis Association in the 1960s and was the youngest ever person to ascend to the role. He was vice-president of the All England Club during the 1980s.

One of his children, Sonia Avery, was the first wife of famous English satirist William Donaldson.
