= André Merlin =

French tennis player

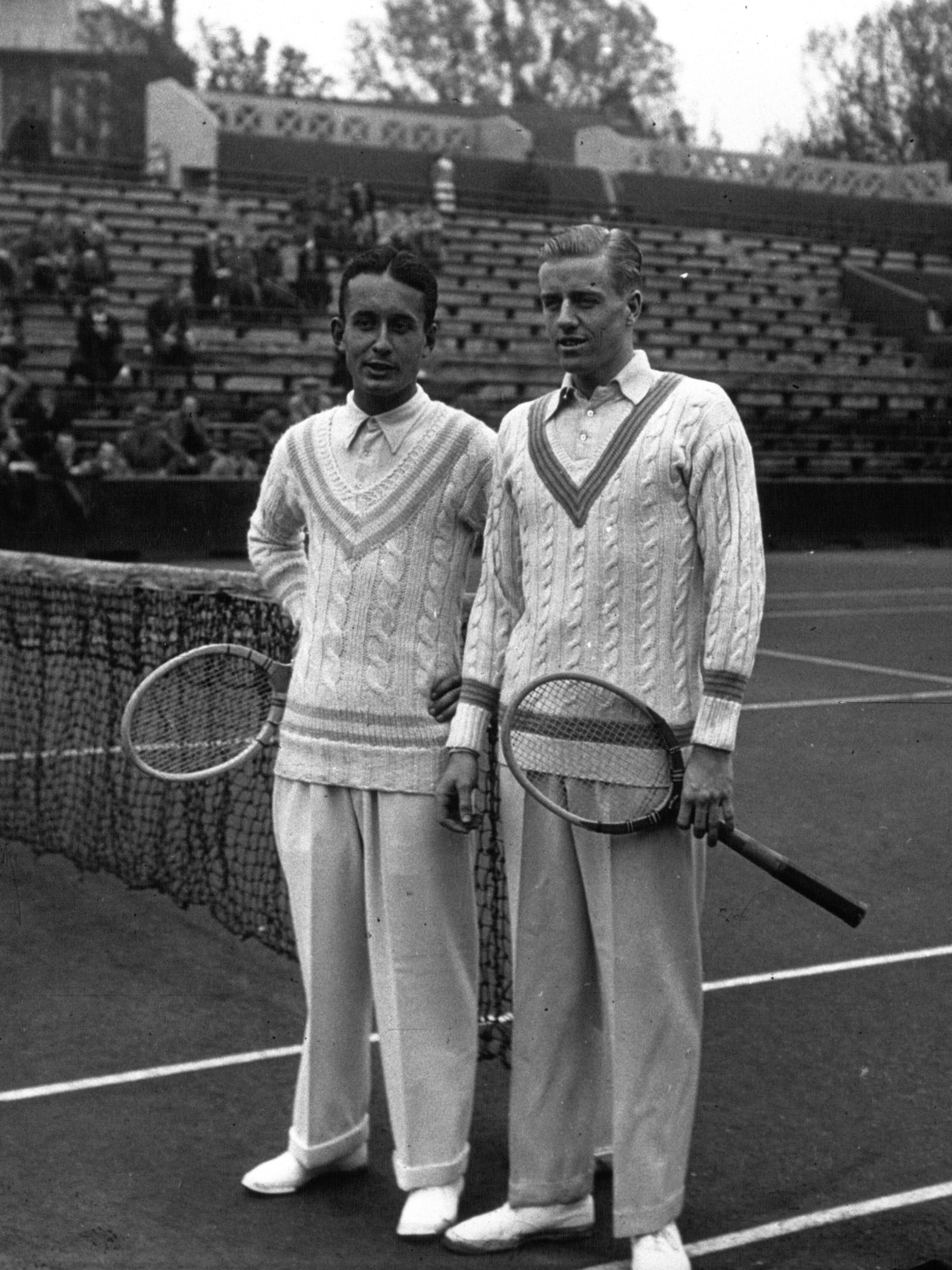
- Merlin (left) and Sidney Wood in 1932
- Full name: André Merlin
- Country (sports): France
- Born: 15 November 1911 Brazzaville, French Equatorial Africa
- Died: 5 September 1960 (aged 48) Paris, France
- Plays: Right-handed

Grand Slam singles results
- French Open: QF (1936)
- Wimbledon: 3R (1933, 1934)
- US Open: 3R (1931)

Grand Slam doubles results
- Wimbledon: SF (1932)

André Merlin (15 November 1911 – 5 September 1960) was a French tennis player.

== Biography ==
Born in Brazzaville on 15 November 1911, he was the son of the Governor-General of French Equatorial Africa, Martial Henri Merlin.

Merlin first represented the France Davis Cup team in the final of the 1933 tournament, against Great Britain at the Stade de Roland Garros. France, under The Four Musketeers, had won the previous six tournaments, but was an ageing side and brought in Merlin to counter the younger British players. Merlin lost the opening match to Bunny Austin in a one sided encounter and Henri Cochet was beaten by Fred Perry, but the French fought back to win the doubles then levelled the tie when Cochet overcame Austin in five sets. This meant it came down to Merlin in the fifth rubber, with his match against Perry to decide the title. Merlin won the first set, but Perry fought back to win in four and secure Britain's first title since 1912. In the second set, Merlin had failed to capitalise on two set points. This would remain the only Davis Cup final that Merlin played, despite his effort in France's 1934 campaign, when his win over Australia's Jack Crawford in the semi-final was not enough to ultimately win the tie.

In August 1934 he was seriously injured in a motorcycle accident near Deauville in France. He crashed into an oncoming vehicle while trying to overtake another and was thrown into a ditch. His leg suffered the worst, with torn ligaments and bad cuts to his knee. He also sprained his ankle. These injuries kept him out of action for the remainder of the year and cast doubts over his future in tennis.

He was hospitalised again in March 1935 when he was poisoned after drinking a veronal bottle. His parents discovered him in his bedroom, and doctors needed to use a stomach pump to restore him to full consciousness. It was reported that it may have been a suicide attempt, with some close friends claiming on court struggles had left him near a nervous breakdown. However, Merlin claimed the overdose was accidental and he had taken it after a tough day training. The bottle had been prescribed after his motor accident to assist his sleep.

In June, he returned to the French Davis Cup team for a quarter-final tie against Australia, in what would be his last appearance in the tournament.

Merlin was a quarter-finalist in the 1936 French Championships, as an unseeded player. He had a win over fifth seed Henner Henkel en route to the quarter-final defeat in which he took countryman Christian Boussus to five sets. After the war, Merlin made one final appearance at his home tournament, at the 1947 French Championships, but ended up defaulting his opening match.

He died in Paris on 5 September 1960, aged 48.

== See also ==
- List of France Davis Cup team representatives
