= Raymond Tuckey =

English tennis player (1910–2005)

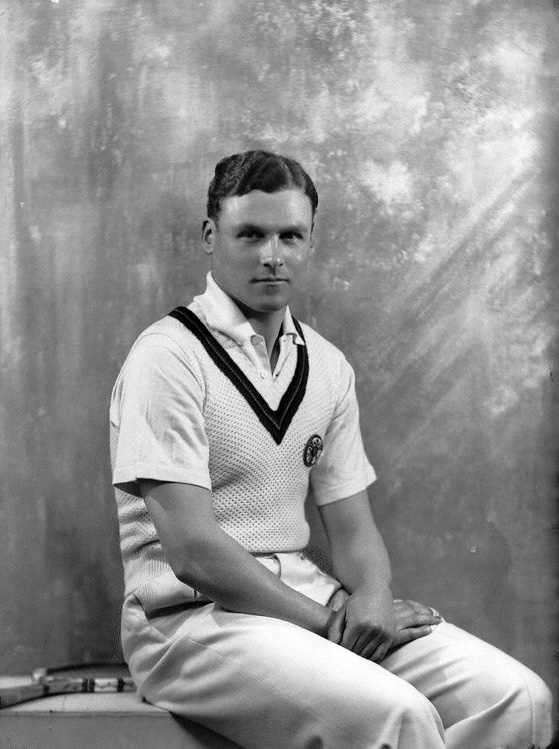
- Tuckey in 1936
- Full name: Charles Raymond Davys Tuckey
- Country (sports): United Kingdom
- Born: 15 June 1910 Godalming, England
- Died: 15 October 2005 (aged 95) Banbury, England
- Plays: Right-handed (one-handed backhand)

Grand Slam singles results
- French Open: 4R (1937)
- Wimbledon: 3R (1932, 1936)

Grand Slam doubles results
- Australian Open: 2R (1934)
- French Open: F (1936)
- Wimbledon: W (1936)

Grand Slam mixed doubles results
- Wimbledon: QF (1937)

Team competitions
- Davis Cup: W (1935, 1936)

Charles Raymond Davys Tuckey (15 June 1910 – 15 October 2005) was an English tennis player.

Raymond Tuckey and Pat Hughes won the doubles in Wimbledon in 1936, defeating Charles Hare and Frank Wilde in five sets. In 1937 he again reached the men's doubles finals at Wimbledon but this time lost with Pat Hughes against American team of Don Budge and Gene Mako in four sets. He was part of the winning British Davis Cup team in 1935 (against the US) and 1936 (against Australia) and of the 1937 team that lost the final to the US.

His mother, Agnes Tuckey, was, with Hope Crisp, the first winner of the Wimbledon mixed doubles in 1913. Agnes, when in her fifties, partnered Raymond in the mixed doubles in 1931 and 1932, the only instance of a parent and child teaming up at the championships. His sister, Kay Tuckey, was also a tennis player.

== Grand Slam finals ==
=== Doubles (1 title, 2 runner-ups) ===
Result	Year	Championship	Surface	Partner	Opponents	Score
Loss	1936	French Championships	Clay	(United Kingdom) Pat Hughes	(France) Jean Borotra (France) Marcel Bernard	2–6, 6–3, 7–9, 1–6
Win	1936	Wimbledon	Grass	(United Kingdom) Pat Hughes	(United Kingdom) Charles Hare (United Kingdom) Frank Wilde	6–4, 3–6, 7–9, 6–1, 6–4
Loss	1937	Wimbledon	Grass	(United Kingdom) Pat Hughes	(United States) Don Budge (United States) Gene Mako	0–6, 4–6, 8–6, 1–6
