= Anker Jacobsen =

Danish tennis player

- Country (sports): Denmark
- Born: 17 July 1911
- Died: 1975

Singles

Grand Slam singles results
- Wimbledon: 2R (1932–34)

Doubles

Grand Slam doubles results
- Wimbledon: 1R (1932–34)

Grand Slam mixed doubles results
- Wimbledon: 2R (1933)

Anker Jacobsen (17 July 1911 – 1975) was a Danish tennis player who was active during the 1930s and 1940s.

== Career ==
Jacobsen, a member of Copenhagen's KB, played at Wimbledon from 1932 to 1934 but lost his first match in each year. He was a member of the Danish Davis Cup team during the same period where he could win four out of eight matches.

Jacobsen won numerous titles at the Danish championships until 1949:

- outdoors:
  - singles: 1933, 1934, 1936–1941
  - doubles: 1947, 1949
  - mixed doubles: 1937–1940, 1941, 1942
- indoors:
  - singles: 1936, 1937, 1939, 1940, 1943
  - doubles: 1943, 1944 1947, 1949
  - mixed doubles: 1936, 1938–1940, 1942
