= Herman David =

English tennis player and official (1905–1974)

- Full name: Herman Francis David
- Country (sports): (United Kingdom) Great Britain
- Born: 26 June 1905 Birmingham, Warwickshire, UK
- Died: 25 February 1974 (aged 68)
- Int. Tennis HoF: 1998 (member page)

Singles

Grand Slam singles results
- French Open: 2R (1932)
- Wimbledon: 4R (1930)

Herman David CBE (26 June 1905 – 25 February 1974) was the son of Herman David-Nillet, diamond trader and consular agent, and Marie Léonie Chavin, who both came from Jura, France. He was an English tennis player and later administrator, notably serving as the chairman of the All England Club. He served as a Davis Cup team representative in 1932 and was a non-playing captain from 1953 until 1958. As an administrator David advocated open tennis and played a pivotal role in making it a reality by announcing the first open edition of the Wimbledon Championships in 1968. In 1998 he was inducted into the International Tennis Hall of Fame. Famously, he served with his left hand and played with his right hand.
