= 1933 International Lawn Tennis Challenge Europe Zone =

International tennis competition

Details
- Duration: 21 April – 15 July 1933
- Teams: 23
- Categories: 1933 Europe Zone; 1931 America Zone

Champion
- Winning nation: Great Britain; Qualified for: 1933 Inter-Zonal Final

The Europe Zone was one of the two regional zones of the 1933 International Lawn Tennis Challenge.

24 teams entered the Europe Zone, with the winner going on to compete in the Inter-Zonal Final against the winner of the America Zone.

Great Britain defeated Australia in the final, and went on to face the United States in the Inter-Zonal Final. In the Qualifying Draw, Germany, Austria, Switzerland and Italy advanced to the 1934 Europe Zone main draw.

== Draw ==
First Round; 21 April–9 May
Greece
bye
Romania
bye
Czechoslovakia
bye
Monaco
bye
Finland	w/o
India
Spain	1
Great Britain	4
Italy	4
Yugoslavia	1
Belgium	2
Austria	3
Denmark	2
Ireland	3
Hungary	0
Japan	5
Germany	5
Egypt	0
Netherlands	3
Poland	2
bye
Switzerland
bye
South Africa
bye
Norway
bye
Australia

Second Round; 12–21 May
Athens, Greece
Greece	4
Romania	1
Prague, Czechoslovakia
Czechoslovakia	5
Monaco	0
London, England (clay)
Finland	0
Great Britain	5
Genoa, Italy (clay)
Italy	4
Austria	1
Dublin, Ireland (grass)
Ireland	0
Japan	5
Berlin, Germany
Germany	4
Netherlands	1
Basel, Switzerland
Switzerland	1
South Africa	4
Oslo, Norway (clay)
Norway	0
Australia	5

Quarterfinals; 8–13 June
Prague, Czechoslovakia
Greece	0
Czechoslovakia	5
Eastbourne, England (grass)
Great Britain	4
Italy	1
Berlin, Germany (clay)
Japan	4
Germany	1
London, England (grass)
South Africa	2
Australia	3

Semifinals; 17–20 June
Eastbourne, England (grass)
Czechoslovakia	0
Great Britain	5
Paris, France (clay)
Japan	2
Australia	3

Final; 13–15 July
Wimbledon, England (grass)
Great Britain	3
Australia	2

== First round ==
=== Spain vs. Great Britain ===
Spain
1
Real Club de Tenis Barcelona, Barcelona, Spain
21–23 April 1933
Clay

Great Britain
4

			1	2	3	4	5
1	(Spain) (United Kingdom)	Enrique Maier; Fred Perry	5; 7	5; 7	2; 6
2	(Spain) (United Kingdom)	Francisco Sindreu; Bunny Austin	0; 6	3; 6	2; 6
3	(Spain) (United Kingdom)	Alberto Durall / Enrique Maier; Pat Hughes / Fred Perry	6; 3	6; 1	1; 6	4; 6	6; 3
4	(Spain) (United Kingdom)	Francisco Sindreu; Fred Perry	1; 6	3; 6	0; 6
5	(Spain) (United Kingdom)	Enrique Maier; Bunny Austin	6; 8	5; 7	1; 6

=== Italy vs. Yugoslavia ===
Italy
4
Florence, Italy
4–6 May 1933
Clay

Yugoslavia
1

			1	2	3	4	5
1	(Italy) (Kingdom of Yugoslavia)	Uberto De Morpurgo; Franjo Punčec	9; 7	6; 3	6; 4
2	(Italy) (Kingdom of Yugoslavia)	Giorgio de Stefani; Franjo Kukuljević	6; 4	6; 0	3; 6	6; 2
3	(Italy) (Kingdom of Yugoslavia)	Uberto De Morpurgo / Augusto Rado; Franjo Kukuljević / Josip Palada	14; 12	3; 6	6; 1	4; 6	3; 6
4	(Italy) (Kingdom of Yugoslavia)	Uberto De Morpurgo; Franjo Kukuljević	7; 5	6; 3	6; 4
5	(Italy) (Kingdom of Yugoslavia)	Giorgio de Stefani; Josip Palada	6; 1	6; 2	6; 2

=== Belgium vs. Austria ===
Belgium
2
Brussels, Belgium
5–7 May 1933

Austria
3

			1	2	3	4	5
1	(Belgium) (Austria)	Léopold de Borman; Hermann von Artens	6; 4	2; 6	4; 6	5; 7
2	(Belgium) (Austria)	André Lacroix; Franz-Wilhelm Matejka	3; 6	4; 6	2; 6
3	(Belgium) (Austria)	Léopold de Borman / André Lacroix; Adam Baworowski / Herbert Kinzl	6; 4	6; 3	6; 1
4	(Belgium) (Austria)	André Lacroix; Hermann von Artens	6; 2	6; 2	6; 4
5	(Belgium) (Austria)	Léopold de Borman; Franz-Wilhelm Matejka	6; 2	4; 6	0; 6	6; 3	3; 6

=== Denmark vs. Ireland ===
Denmark
2
Copenhagen, Denmark
7–9 May 1933

Ireland
3

			1	2	3	4	5
1	(Denmark) (Republic of Ireland)	Einer Ulrich; George Lyttleton-Rogers	6; 8	2; 6	2; 6
2	(Denmark) (Republic of Ireland)	Anker Jacobsen; George McVeagh	3; 6	2; 6	6; 4	8; 6	6; 3
3	(Denmark) (Republic of Ireland)	Povl Henriksen / Einer Ulrich; George Lyttleton-Rogers / Edward McGuire	6; 4	1; 6	6; 8	4; 6
4	(Denmark) (Republic of Ireland)	Anker Jacobsen; George Lyttleton-Rogers	1; 6	3; 6	4; 6
5	(Denmark) (Republic of Ireland)	Einer Ulrich; George McVeagh	6; 2	6; 3	6; 3

=== Hungary vs. Japan ===
Hungary
0
Budapest, Hungary
5–7 May 1933

Japan
5

			1	2	3	4	5
1	(Hungary) (Japan)	Emil Gábori; Jiro Sato	4; 6	2; 6	3; 6
2	(Hungary) (Japan)	Béla von Kehrling; Ryosuke Nunoi	6; 4	6; 8	3; 6	1; 6
3	(Hungary) (Japan)	Emil Gábori / Imre Zichy; Ryosuke Nunoi / Jiro Sato	0; 6	1; 6	2; 6
4	(Hungary) (Japan)	Béla von Kehrling; Jiro Sato	4; 6	4; 6	7; 9
5	(Hungary) (Japan)	Emil Gábori; Ryosuke Nunoi	6; 3	6; 1	3; 6	7; 9	4; 6

=== Germany vs. Egypt ===
Germany
5
Wiesbaden, Germany
5–7 May 1933

Egypt
0

			1	2	3	4	5
1	(Germany) (Egypt)	Gottfried von Cramm; Loutfalla Wahid	6; 3	6; 4	6; 2
2	(Germany) (Egypt)	Eberhard Nourney; Adolphe Bogdagli	8; 6	6; 1	6; 1
3	(Germany) (Egypt)	Gottfried von Cramm / Gustav Jaenecke; Ahmed Shukry / Loutfalla Wahid	4; 6	6; 4	8; 6	6; 4
4	(Germany) (Egypt)	Gottfried von Cramm; Adolphe Bogdagli	6; 2	6; 2	6; 2
5	(Germany) (Egypt)	Eberhard Nourney; Loutfalla Wahid	5; 7	8; 6	6; 2	9; 7

=== Netherlands vs. Poland ===
Netherlands
3
The Hague, Netherlands
5–7 May 1933
Clay

Poland
2

			1	2	3	4	5
1	(Netherlands) (Poland)	Hendrik Timmer; Józef Hebda	6; 3	6; 2	6; 2
2	(Netherlands) (Poland)	Tod Hughan; Ignacy Tłoczyński	1; 6	2; 6	4; 6
3	(Netherlands) (Poland)	Arthur Diemer-Kool / Hendrik Timmer; Józef Hebda / Ignacy Tłoczyński	3; 6	6; 1	6; 2	6; 3
4	(Netherlands) (Poland)	Hendrik Timmer; Ignacy Tłoczyński	6; 1	3; 6	6; 4	3; 6	6; 2
5	(Netherlands) (Poland)	Tod Hughan; Józef Hebda	3; 6	1; 6	3; 6

== Second round ==
=== Greece vs. Romania ===
Greece
4
Athens, Greece
12–14 May 1933

Romania
1

			1	2	3	4	5
1	(Greece) (Romania)	Georgios Nikolaides; Tibor Rétti	7; 5	6; 1	6; 3
2	(Greece) (Romania)	Lazaros Stalios; Gică Poulieff	6; 2	4; 6	6; 3	7; 5
3	(Greece) (Romania)	Lazaros Stalios / Stefanos Xydis; Gică Poulieff / Tibor Rétti	3; 6	2; 6	6; 3	5; 7
4	(Greece) (Romania)	Georgios Nikolaides; Gică Poulieff	6; 2	1; 6	6; 2	6; 2
5	(Greece) (Romania)	Stefanos Xydis; Alexandru Botez	4; 6	6; 3	6; 4	6; 1

=== Czechoslovakia vs. Monaco ===
Czechoslovakia
5
Prague, Czechoslovakia
12–14 May 1933

Monaco
0

			1	2	3	4	5
1	(Czechoslovakia) (Monaco)	Roderich Menzel; Vladimir Landau	6; 2	6; 2	6; 4
2	(Czechoslovakia) (Monaco)	Josef Šíba; René Gallèpe	6; 1	6; 2	6; 1
3	(Czechoslovakia) (Monaco)	Ferenc Maršálek / Roderich Menzel; René Gallèpe / Vladimir Landau	6; 1	6; 4	8; 6
4	(Czechoslovakia) (Monaco)	Josef Šíba; Vladimir Landau	3; 6	9; 7	6; 4	6; 1
5	(Czechoslovakia) (Monaco)	Roderich Menzel; René Gallèpe	6; 3	6; 2	6; 1

=== Great Britain vs. Finland ===
Great Britain
5
Queen's Club, London, England
13–16 May 1933
Clay

Finland
0

			1	2	3	4	5
1	(United Kingdom) (Finland)	Fred Perry; Bo Grotenfelt	6; 0	6; 3	6; 1
2	(United Kingdom) (Finland)	Bunny Austin; Arne Grahn	6; 0	6; 2	6; 2
3	(United Kingdom) (Finland)	Pat Hughes / Fred Perry; Arne Grahn / Bo Grotenfelt	6; 1	6; 1	6; 3
4	(United Kingdom) (Finland)	Fred Perry; Arne Grahn	6; 1	6; 2	6; 4
5	(United Kingdom) (Finland)	Bunny Austin; Bo Grotenfelt	6; 0	6; 1	6; 4

=== Italy vs. Austria ===
Italy
4
Genoa, Italy
19–21 May 1933
Clay

Austria
1

			1	2	3	4	5
1	(Italy) (Austria)	Giorgio de Stefani; Hermann von Artens	7; 5	6; 2	6; 0
2	(Italy) (Austria)	Uberto De Morpurgo; Franz-Wilhelm Matejka	3; 6	6; 3	6; 3	3; 6	3; 6
3	(Italy) (Austria)	Augusto Rado / Valentino Taroni; Hermann von Artens / Franz-Wilhelm Matejka	6; 3	4; 6	4; 6	6; 2	7; 5
4	(Italy) (Austria)	Giorgio de Stefani; Franz-Wilhelm Matejka	6; 3	6; 3	4; 6	6; 2
5	(Italy) (Austria)	Uberto De Morpurgo; Hermann von Artens	4; 6	7; 5	6; 3	6; 3

=== Ireland vs. Japan ===
Ireland
0
Fitzwilliam Lawn Tennis Club, Dublin, Ireland
18–20 May 1933
Grass

Japan
5

			1	2	3	4	5
1	(Republic of Ireland) (Japan)	George Lyttleton-Rogers; Ryosuke Nunoi	5; 7	3; 6	5; 7
2	(Republic of Ireland) (Japan)	Edward McGuire; Jiro Sato	2; 6	2; 6	2; 6
3	(Republic of Ireland) (Japan)	George Lyttleton-Rogers / Edward McGuire; Ryosuke Nunoi / Jiro Sato	3; 6	6; 8	6; 3	2; 6
4	(Republic of Ireland) (Japan)	George Lyttleton-Rogers; Jiro Sato	1; 6	3; 6	1; 6
5	(Republic of Ireland) (Japan)	Edward McGuire; Ryosuke Nunoi	6; 4	6; 3	4; 6	3; 6	3; 6

=== Germany vs. Netherlands ===
Germany
4
Berlin, Germany
19–21 May 1933

Netherlands
1

			1	2	3	4	5
1	(Germany) (Netherlands)	Gottfried von Cramm; Hendrik Timmer	6; 2	6; 3	1; 6	6; 4
2	(Germany) (Netherlands)	Fritz Kuhlmann; Gerard Leembruggen	6; 3	6; 3	6; 1
3	(Germany) (Netherlands)	Gottfried von Cramm / Eberhard Nourney; Ody Koopman / Hendrik Timmer	6; 3	6; 1	1; 6	8; 6
4	(Germany) (Netherlands)	Gottfried von Cramm; Gerard Leembruggen	6; 3	6; 2	6; 3
5	(Germany) (Netherlands)	Fritz Kuhlmann; Hendrik Timmer	2; 6	1; 6	2; 6

=== Switzerland vs. South Africa ===
Switzerland
1
Basel, Switzerland
19–21 May 1933

South Africa
4

			1	2	3	4	5
1	(Switzerland) (South Africa)	Hector Fisher; Vernon Kirby	7; 5	4; 6	6; 0	5; 7	3; 6
2	(Switzerland) (South Africa)	Max Ellmer; Colin Robbins	1; 6	1; 6	7; 5	3; 6
3	(Switzerland) (South Africa)	Hector Fisher / Werner Steiner; Norman Farquharson / Vernon Kirby	4; 6	3; 6	2; 6
4	(Switzerland) (South Africa)	Max Ellmer; Jack Condon	6; 4	4; 6	6; 4	6; 2
5	(Switzerland) (South Africa)	Hector Fisher; Colin Robbins	10; 8	6; 3	1; 6	4; 6	4; 6

=== Norway vs. Australia ===
Norway
0
Oslo, Norway
12–14 May 1933
Clay

Australia
5

			1	2	3	4	5
1	(Norway) (Australia)	Johan Haanes; Jack Crawford	1; 6	3; 6	3; 6
2	(Norway) (Australia)	Finn-Trygve Smith; Vivian McGrath	1; 6	1; 6	3; 6
3	(Norway) (Australia)	Johan Haanes / Ragnar Hagen; Jack Crawford / Don Turnbull	2; 6	3; 6	1; 6
4	(Norway) (Australia)	Finn-Trygve Smith; Adrian Quist	5; 7	6; 4	1; 6	0; 6
5	(Norway) (Australia)	Johan Haanes; Vivian McGrath	5; 7	5; 7	2; 6

== Quarterfinals ==
=== Czechoslovakia vs. Greece ===
Czechoslovakia
5
Prague, Czechoslovakia
8–10 June 1933

Greece
0

			1	2	3	4	5
1	(Czechoslovakia) (Greece)	Josef Šíba; Georgios Nikolaides	6; 3	3; 6	6; 2	6; 1
2	(Czechoslovakia) (Greece)	Roderich Menzel; Lazaros Stalios	6; 2	6; 4	9; 7
3	(Czechoslovakia) (Greece)	Ferenc Maršálek / Roderich Menzel; Georgios Nikolaides / Stefanos Xydis	6; 1	6; 1	6; 1
4	(Czechoslovakia) (Greece)	Josef Šíba; Lazaros Stalios	6; 3	6; 1	3; 6	8; 6
5	(Czechoslovakia) (Greece)	Roderich Menzel; Georgios Nikolaides	6; 1	6; 2	4; 6	6; 0

=== Great Britain vs. Italy ===
Great Britain
4
Devonshire Park Lawn Tennis Club, Eastbourne, England
8–10 June 1933
Grass

Italy
1

			1	2	3	4	5
1	(United Kingdom) (Italy)	Fred Perry; Uberto De Morpurgo	6; 4	7; 5	6; 4
2	(United Kingdom) (Italy)	Bunny Austin; Giorgio de Stefani	6; 2	7; 5	7; 5
3	(United Kingdom) (Italy)	Pat Hughes / Fred Perry; Augusto Rado / Valentino Taroni	6; 1	6; 4	9; 7
4	(United Kingdom) (Italy)	Fred Perry; Giorgio de Stefani	7; 5	4; 6	4; 6	4; 6
5	(United Kingdom) (Italy)	Bunny Austin; Uberto De Morpurgo	6; 4	6; 3	6; 2

=== Germany vs. Japan ===
Germany
1
Slav-Weiss Tennis Club, Berlin, Germany
9–11 June 1933
Clay

Japan
4

			1	2	3	4	5
1	(Germany) (Japan)	Gottfried von Cramm; Jiro Sato	3; 6	6; 2	3; 6	4; 6
2	(Germany) (Japan)	Gustav Jaenecke; Ryosuke Nunoi	2; 6	6; 4	3; 6	2; 6
3	(Germany) (Japan)	Gottfried von Cramm / Eberhard Nourney; Ryosuke Nunoi / Jiro Sato	2; 6	3; 6	6; 3	1; 6
4	(Germany) (Japan)	Gustav Jaenecke; Jiro Sato	2; 6	2; 6	2; 6
5	(Germany) (Japan)	Gottfried von Cramm; Ryosuke Nunoi	3; 6	6; 2	7; 5	5; 7	6; 3

=== Australia vs. South Africa ===
Australia
3
Queen's Club, London, England
10–13 June 1933
Grass

South Africa
2

			1	2	3	4	5
1	(Australia) (South Africa)	Jack Crawford; Vernon Kirby	8; 6	6; 1	6; 3
2	(Australia) (South Africa)	Vivian McGrath; Colin Robbins	7; 5	6; 4	4; 6	10; 8
3	(Australia) (South Africa)	Jack Crawford / Vivian McGrath; Norman Farquharson / Vernon Kirby	4; 6	4; 6	4; 6
4	(Australia) (South Africa)	Vivian McGrath; Vernon Kirby	8; 6	0; 6	4; 6	2; 6
5	(Australia) (South Africa)	Jack Crawford; Colin Robbins	6; 4	6; 1	6; 0

== Semifinals ==
=== Great Britain vs. Czechoslovakia ===
Great Britain
5
Devonshire Park Lawn Tennis Club, Eastbourne, England
17–20 June 1933
Grass

Czechoslovakia
0

			1	2	3	4	5
1	(United Kingdom) (Czechoslovakia)	Fred Perry; Roderich Menzel	6; 1	6; 4	6; 3
2	(United Kingdom) (Czechoslovakia)	Bunny Austin; Ladislav Hecht	6; 1	11; 9	6; 4
3	(United Kingdom) (Czechoslovakia)	Pat Hughes / Fred Perry; Ferenc Maršálek / Roderich Menzel	6; 3	6; 4	6; 4
4	(United Kingdom) (Czechoslovakia)	Fred Perry; Ladislav Hecht	6; 2	6; 2	6; 2
5	(United Kingdom) (Czechoslovakia)	Bunny Austin; Roderich Menzel	3; 6	9; 7	6; 0	6; 1

=== Australia vs. Japan ===
Australia
3
Stade Roland Garros, Paris, France
17–19 June 1933
Clay

Japan
2

			1	2	3	4	5
1	(Australia) (Japan)	Jack Crawford; Ryosuke Nunoi	6; 2	4; 6	6; 3	4; 6	7; 5
2	(Australia) (Japan)	Vivian McGrath; Jiro Sato	9; 7	1; 6	4; 6	6; 4	7; 5
3	(Australia) (Japan)	Jack Crawford / Adrian Quist; Ryosuke Nunoi / Jiro Sato	7; 5	7; 9	6; 3	3; 6	6; 3
4	(Australia) (Japan)	Vivian McGrath; Ryosuke Nunoi	4; 6	4; 6	8; 6	5; 7
5	(Australia) (Japan)	Jack Crawford; Jiro Sato	6; 3	3; 6	1; 6	6; 1	2; 6

== Final ==
=== Great Britain vs. Australia ===
Great Britain
3
Centre Court, All England Club, Wimbledon, England
13–15 July 1933
Grass

Australia
2

			1	2	3	4	5
1	(United Kingdom) (Australia)	Bunny Austin; Jack Crawford	6; 4	2; 6	2; 6	3; 6
2	(United Kingdom) (Australia)	Fred Perry; Vivian McGrath	6; 2	6; 4	6; 2
3	(United Kingdom) (Australia)	Pat Hughes / Fred Perry; Adrian Quist / Don Turnbull	7; 5	6; 4	3; 6	6; 3
4	(United Kingdom) (Australia)	Bunny Austin; Vivian McGrath	6; 4	7; 5	6; 3
5	(United Kingdom) (Australia)	Harry Lee; Jack Crawford	6; 8	5; 7	4; 6
