= 1931 International Lawn Tennis Challenge Europe Zone =

International tennis competition

Details
- Duration: 16 April – 11 July 1931
- Teams: 22
- Categories: 1931 Europe Zone; 1931 America Zone

Champion
- Winning nation: Great Britain; Qualified for: 1931 Inter-Zonal Final

The Europe Zone was one of the two regional zones of the 1931 International Lawn Tennis Challenge.

22 teams entered the Europe Zone, with the winner going on to compete in the Inter-Zonal Final against the winner of the America Zone. Great Britain defeated Czechoslovakia in the final, and went on to face the United States in the Inter-Zonal Final.

== Draw ==
First Round; 16 April–5 May
Finland
bye
Egypt
bye
Yugoslavia
bye
Japan
bye
Belgium
bye
Great Britain	5
Monaco	0
Germany	0
South Africa	5
Switzerland	0
Ireland	5
Greece	3
Austria	2
Spain	2
Czechoslovakia	3
Italy	4
Hungary	1
bye
Netherlands
bye
Norway
bye
Poland
bye
Denmark
bye
Romania

Second Round; 8–17 May
Helsinki, Finland
Finland	1
Egypt	4
Zagreb, Yugoslavia
Yugoslavia	0
Japan	5
Brussels, Belgium (clay)
Belgium	0
Great Britain	5
Dublin, Ireland (grass)
South Africa	4
Ireland	1
Athens, Greece
Greece	1
Czechoslovakia	4
Turin, Italy (clay)
Italy	3
Netherlands	0
Oslo, Norway (clay)
Norway	0
Poland	3
Copenhagen, Denmark
Denmark	5
Romania	0

Quarterfinals; 20 May–6 June
Paris, France (clay)
Egypt	0
Japan	5
Eastbourne, England (grass)
Great Britain	5
South Africa	0
Prague, Czechoslovakia
Czechoslovakia	3
Italy	0
Copenhagen, Denmark
Poland	2
Denmark	3

Semifinals; 12–18 June
Eastbourne, England (grass)
Japan	0
Great Britain	5
Copenhagen, Denmark
Czechoslovakia	5
Denmark	0

Final; 9–11 July
Prague, Czechoslovakia (clay)
Great Britain	4
Czechoslovakia	1

== First round ==
=== Great Britain vs. Monaco ===
Great Britain
5
Carhullen Lawn Tennis Club, Plymouth, England
23–25 April 1931
Clay

Monaco
0

			1	2	3	4	5
1	(United Kingdom) (Monaco)	Bunny Austin; Vladimir Landau	6; 0	6; 0	6; 1
2	(United Kingdom) (Monaco)	Fred Perry; René Gallèpe	6; 3	6; 2	6; 5
3	(United Kingdom) (Monaco)	Pat Hughes / Charles Kingsley; René Gallèpe / Vladimir Landau	6; 0	6; 2	6; 0
4	(United Kingdom) (Monaco)	Bunny Austin; René Gallèpe	6; 0	6; 1	6; 2
5	(United Kingdom) (Monaco)	Charles Kingsley; Vladimir Landau	6; 0	6; 1	6; 4

=== Germany vs. South Africa ===
Germany
0
Düsseldorf, Germany
1–3 May 1931

South Africa
5

			1	2	3	4	5
1	(Germany) (South Africa)	Phillip Buss; Vernon Kirby	6; 1	1; 6	2; 6	3; 6
2	(Germany) (South Africa)	Eberhard Nourney; Louis Raymond	6; 3	3; 6	6; 4	4; 6	5; 7
3	(Germany) (South Africa)	Walter Dessart / Eberhard Nourney; Norman Farquharson / Vernon Kirby	2; 6	3; 6	3; 6
4	(Germany) (South Africa)	Eberhard Nourney; Vernon Kirby	6; 4	3; 6	4; 6	3; 6
5	(Germany) (South Africa)	Phillip Buss; Louis Raymond	6; 4	3; 6	5; 7	6; 8

=== Switzerland vs. Ireland ===
Switzerland
0
Montreux, Switzerland
2–5 May 1931

Ireland
5

			1	2	3	4	5
1	(Switzerland) (Republic of Ireland)	Charles Aeschlimann; George Lyttleton-Rogers	2; 6	5; 7	2; 6
2	(Switzerland) (Republic of Ireland)	Hector Fisher; Edward McGuire	4; 6	5; 7	5; 7
3	(Switzerland) (Republic of Ireland)	Charles Aeschlimann / Hector Fisher; George Lyttleton-Rogers / Charles Scroope	3; 6	7; 5	11; 13	2; 6
4	(Switzerland) (Republic of Ireland)	Charles Aeschlimann; Edward McGuire	7; 5	5; 7	6; 2	6; 8	2; 6
5	(Switzerland) (Republic of Ireland)	Hector Fisher; George Lyttleton-Rogers	1; 6	6; 2	2; 6	6; 8

=== Greece vs. Austria ===
Greece
3
Athens, Greece
16–18 April 1931

Austria
2

			1	2	3	4	5
1	(Greece) (Austria)	Orestis Garangiotis; Franz-Wilhelm Matejka	8; 6	3; 6	7; 5	1; 6	6; 4
2	(Greece) (Austria)	Augustos Zerlendis; Hermann von Artens	1; 6	6; 3	1; 6	6; 2	8; 6
3	(Greece) (Austria)	Max Balli / I. Georgiadis; Hermann von Artens / Michael Haberl	7; 5	3; 6	4; 6	4; 6
4	(Greece) (Austria)	Orestis Garangiotis; Hermann von Artens	6; 1	2; 6	6; 4	6; 8	6; 2
5	(Greece) (Austria)	Augustos Zerlendis; Franz-Wilhelm Matejka	3; 6	2; 6	8; 6	3; 6

=== Czechoslovakia vs. Spain ===
Czechoslovakia
3
Prague, Czechoslovakia
1–3 May 1931

Spain
2

			1	2	3	4	5
1	(Czechoslovakia) (Spain)	Roderich Menzel; Enrique Maier	6; 3	6; 2	6; 3
2	(Czechoslovakia) (Spain)	Ladislav Hecht; Manuel Alonso Areizaga	6; 3	4; 6	7; 5	0; 6	6; 1
3	(Czechoslovakia) (Spain)	Roderich Menzel / Friedrich Rohrer; Manuel Alonso Areizaga / Enrique Maier	1; 6	7; 9	1; 6
4	(Czechoslovakia) (Spain)	Ladislav Hecht; Enrique Maier	6; 4	3; 6	4; 6	4; 6
5	(Czechoslovakia) (Spain)	Roderich Menzel; Manuel Alonso Areizaga	6; 8	6; 2	6; 1	6; 3

=== Hungary vs. Italy ===
Hungary
1
Budapest, Hungary
1–3 May 1931

Italy
4

			1	2	3	4	5
1	(Hungary) (Italy)	Imre Takáts; Giorgio de Stefani	3; 6	3; 6	3; 6
2	(Hungary) (Italy)	Béla von Kehrling; Uberto De Morpurgo	6; 3	6; 3	6; 4
3	(Hungary) (Italy)	Emil Gábori / Béla von Kehrling; Alberto del Bono / Uberto De Morpurgo	6; 8	6; 3	5; 7	5; 7
4	(Hungary) (Italy)	Imre Takáts; Uberto De Morpurgo	3; 6	6; 8	1; 6
5	(Hungary) (Italy)	Béla von Kehrling; Giorgio de Stefani	2; 6	6; 4	2; 6	6; 4	2; 6

== Second round ==
=== Finland vs. Egypt ===
Finland
1
Helsinki, Finland
8–10 May 1931

Egypt
4

			1	2	3	4	5
1	(Finland) (Egypt)	Arne Grahn; Loutfalla Wahid	8; 6	6; 3	6; 8	6; 3
2	(Finland) (Egypt)	Bo Grotenfelt; Jacques Grandguillot	6; 3	1; 6	4; 6	2; 6
3	(Finland) (Egypt)	Arne Grahn / Bo Grotenfelt; Jacques Grandguillot / Ahmed Shukry	4; 6	6; 2	4; 6	6; 3	5; 7
4	(Finland) (Egypt)	Arne Grahn; Jacques Grandguillot	6; 3	5; 7	5; 7	2; 6
5	(Finland) (Egypt)	Bo Grotenfelt; Loutfalla Wahid	3; 6	6; 2	4; 6	4; 6

=== Yugoslavia vs. Japan ===
Yugoslavia
0
Zagreb, Yugoslavia
8–10 May 1931

Japan
5

			1	2	3	4	5
1	(Kingdom of Yugoslavia) (Japan)	Franjo Kukuljević; Jiro Sato	3; 6	3; 6	2; 6
2	(Kingdom of Yugoslavia) (Japan)	Franjo Šefer; Hyotaro Sato	3; 6	4; 6	5; 7
3	(Kingdom of Yugoslavia) (Japan)	Franjo Kukuljević / Franjo Šefer; Minoru Kawachi / Jiro Sato	7; 9	6; 3	7; 9	3; 6
4	(Kingdom of Yugoslavia) (Japan)	Franjo Kukuljević; Hyotaro Sato	3; 6	2; 6	6; 3	7; 5	2; 6
5	(Kingdom of Yugoslavia) (Japan)	Franjo Šefer; Jiro Sato	5; 7	3; 6	0; 6

=== Belgium vs. Great Britain ===
Belgium
0
Royal Léopold Club, Brussels, Belgium
9–11 May 1931
Clay

Great Britain
5

			1	2	3	4	5
1	(Belgium) (United Kingdom)	André Lacroix; Bunny Austin	4; 6	4; 6	4; 6
2	(Belgium) (United Kingdom)	Léopold de Borman; Fred Perry	2; 6	0; 6	2; 6
3	(Belgium) (United Kingdom)	Léopold de Borman / André Lacroix; Pat Hughes / Fred Perry	1; 6	4; 6	2; 6
4	(Belgium) (United Kingdom)	Léopold de Borman; Bunny Austin	0; 6	1; 6	0; 6
5	(Belgium) (United Kingdom)	André Lacroix; Fred Perry	6; 8	4; 6	5; 7

=== Ireland vs. South Africa ===
Ireland
1
Fitzwilliam Lawn Tennis Club, Dublin, Ireland
14–16 May 1931
Grass

South Africa
4

			1	2	3	4	5
1	(Republic of Ireland) (South Africa)	George Lyttleton-Rogers; Pat Spence	6; 4	6; 2	4; 6	4; 6	6; 4
2	(Republic of Ireland) (South Africa)	Edward McGuire; Vernon Kirby	6; 4	3; 6	5; 7	5; 7
3	(Republic of Ireland) (South Africa)	George Lyttleton-Rogers / Charles Scroope; Norman Farquharson / Pat Spence	6; 1	1; 6	5; 7	6; 2	3; 6
4	(Republic of Ireland) (South Africa)	Edward McGuire; Pat Spence	3; 6	4; 6	2; 6
5	(Republic of Ireland) (South Africa)	George Lyttleton-Rogers; Vernon Kirby	6; 3	5; 7	8; 10	2; 6

=== Greece vs. Czechoslovakia ===
Greece
1
Athens, Greece
15–17 May 1931

Czechoslovakia
4

			1	2	3	4	5
1	(Greece) (Czechoslovakia)	Augustos Zerlendis; Roderich Menzel	2; 6	2; 6	1; 6
2	(Greece) (Czechoslovakia)	Orestis Garangiotis; Ladislav Hecht	1; 6	8; 6	6; 2	11; 9
3	(Greece) (Czechoslovakia)	Max Balli / Georgios Nikolaides; Ferenc Maršálek / Roderich Menzel	2; 6	2; 6	4; 6
4	(Greece) (Czechoslovakia)	Augustos Zerlendis; Ladislav Hecht	2; 6	4; 6	6; 3	4; 6
5	(Greece) (Czechoslovakia)	Orestis Garangiotis; Roderich Menzel	1; 6	3; 6	1; 6

=== Italy vs. Netherlands ===
Italy
3
Turin Tennis Club, Turin, Italy
15–17 May 1931
Clay

Netherlands
0

			1	2	3	4	5
1	(Italy) (Netherlands)	Uberto De Morpurgo; Aad Knappert	6; 3	6; 1	6; 1
2	(Italy) (Netherlands)	Giorgio de Stefani; Jan van der Heide	6; 3	6; 3	6; 3
3	(Italy) (Netherlands)	Alberto del Bono / Uberto De Morpurgo; Jan van der Heide / Aad Knappert	2; 6	6; 2	6; 4	6; 1
4	(Italy) (Netherlands)	Uberto De Morpurgo; Jan van der Heide						not played
5	(Italy) (Netherlands)	Giorgio de Stefani; Aad Knappert						not played

=== Norway vs. Poland ===
Norway
0
Oslo, Norway
13–15 May 1931
Clay

Poland
3

			1	2	3	4	5
1	(Norway) (Poland)	Jack Nielsen; Józef Hebda	1; 6	1; 6	2; 6
2	(Norway) (Poland)	Torleif Torkildsen; Ignacy Tłoczyński	2; 6	1; 6	5; 7
3	(Norway) (Poland)	Rolf Christoffersen / Oscar Fagerstrøm; Maksymilian Stolarow / Ignacy Tłoczyński	2; 6	2; 6	7; 5	2; 6
4	(Norway) (Poland)	Torleif Torkildsen; Józef Hebda						not played
5	(Norway) (Poland)	Jack Nielsen; Ignacy Tłoczyński						not played

=== Denmark vs. Romania ===
Denmark
5
Copenhagen, Denmark
13–15 May 1931

Romania
0

			1	2	3	4	5
1	(Denmark) (Romania)	Einer Ulrich; Nicolae Mișu	6; 4	6; 4	9; 7
2	(Denmark) (Romania)	Povl Henriksen; Ion Bunea	6; 0	6; 2	6; 3
3	(Denmark) (Romania)	Povl Henriksen / Einer Ulrich; Ion Bunea / Nicolae Mișu	6; 4	6; 2	6; 3
4	(Denmark) (Romania)	Einer Ulrich; Ion Bunea	6; 1	6; 1	6; 0
5	(Denmark) (Romania)	Povl Henriksen; Nicolae Mișu	4; 6	6; 1	6; 4	4; 6	6; 1

== Quarterfinals ==
=== Japan vs. Egypt ===
Japan
5
Paris, France
2–4 June 1931
Clay

Egypt
0

			1	2	3	4	5
1	(Japan) (Egypt)	Jiro Sato; Pierre Grandguillot	6; 0	6; 1	6; 0
2	(Japan) (Egypt)	Hyotaro Sato; Loutfalla Wahid	6; 4	2; 6	6; 1	6; 8	6; 1
3	(Japan) (Egypt)	Minoru Kawachi / Jiro Sato; Ahmed Shukry / Loutfalla Wahid	6; 2	6; 2	6; 1
4	(Japan) (Egypt)	Minoru Kawachi; Loutfalla Wahid	6; 3	4; 6	8; 6	3; 6	6; 2
5	(Japan) (Egypt)	Hyotaro Sato; Ahmed Shukry	6; 0	6; 1	6; 2

=== Great Britain vs. South Africa ===
Great Britain
5
Devonshire Park Lawn Tennis Club, Eastbourne, England
4–6 June 1931
Grass

South Africa
0

			1	2	3	4	5
1	(United Kingdom) (South Africa)	Bunny Austin; Vernon Kirby	6; 2	6; 8	2; 6	10; 8	6; 3
2	(United Kingdom) (South Africa)	Fred Perry; Norman Farquharson	6; 2	6; 3	6; 3
3	(United Kingdom) (South Africa)	Pat Hughes / Fred Perry; Norman Farquharson / Pat Spence	8; 6	6; 4	6; 3
4	(United Kingdom) (South Africa)	Fred Perry; Vernon Kirby	3; 6	6; 4	6; 1	6; 4
5	(United Kingdom) (South Africa)	Bunny Austin; Norman Farquharson	6; 2	5; 7	6; 2	6; 3

=== Czechoslovakia vs. Italy ===
Czechoslovakia
3
Prague, Czechoslovakia
4–6 June 1931

Italy
0

			1	2	3	4	5
1	(Czechoslovakia) (Italy)	Ladislav Hecht; Giorgio de Stefani	6; 4	7; 5	3; 6	8; 6
2	(Czechoslovakia) (Italy)	Roderich Menzel; Uberto De Morpurgo	6; 3	6; 3	4; 6	6; 2
3	(Czechoslovakia) (Italy)	Ferenc Maršálek / Roderich Menzel; Alberto del Bono / Uberto De Morpurgo	6; 3	6; 4	6; 1
4	(Czechoslovakia) (Italy)	Roderich Menzel; Giorgio de Stefani						not played
5	(Czechoslovakia) (Italy)	Ladislav Hecht; Uberto De Morpurgo						not played

=== Denmark vs. Poland ===
Denmark
3
Copenhagen, Denmark
20–22 May 1931

Poland
2

			1	2	3	4	5
1	(Denmark) (Poland)	Povl Henriksen; Józef Hebda	6; 3	6; 1	6; 2
2	(Denmark) (Poland)	Einer Ulrich; Ignacy Tłoczyński	6; 8	1; 6	6; 3	8; 6	2; 6
3	(Denmark) (Poland)	Povl Henriksen / Einer Ulrich; Maksymilian Stolarow / Ignacy Tłoczyński	6; 4	7; 9	3; 6	6; 3	6; 4
4	(Denmark) (Poland)	Einer Ulrich; Józef Hebda	6; 2	6; 4	6; 3
5	(Denmark) (Poland)	Povl Henriksen; Ignacy Tłoczyński	2; 6	6; 4	3; 6	2; 6

== Semifinals ==
=== Great Britain vs. Japan ===
Great Britain
5
Devonshire Park Lawn Tennis Club, Eastbourne, England
12–15 June 1931
Grass

Japan
0

			1	2	3	4	5
1	(United Kingdom) (Japan)	Fred Perry; Jiro Sato	6; 1	4; 6	7; 5	7; 5
2	(United Kingdom) (Japan)	Bunny Austin; Hyotaro Sato	0; 6	6; 2	6; 4	6; 1
3	(United Kingdom) (Japan)	Pat Hughes / Fred Perry; Minoru Kawachi / Jiro Sato	6; 4	6; 4	8; 6
4	(United Kingdom) (Japan)	Bunny Austin; Minoru Kawachi	6; 1	0; 6	8; 6	6; 2
5	(United Kingdom) (Japan)	Fred Perry; Hyotaro Sato	6; 2	6; 3	4; 6	6; 2

=== Denmark vs. Czechoslovakia ===
Denmark
0
Copenhagen, Denmark
16–18 June 1931

Czechoslovakia
5

			1	2	3	4	5
1	(Denmark) (Czechoslovakia)	Einer Ulrich; Roderich Menzel	3; 6	2; 6	5; 7
2	(Denmark) (Czechoslovakia)	Povl Henriksen; Ladislav Hecht	8; 6	0; 6	6; 3	2; 6	9; 11
3	(Denmark) (Czechoslovakia)	Einer Ulrich / Erik Worm; Ferenc Maršálek / Roderich Menzel	7; 9	6; 1	3; 6	0; 6
4	(Denmark) (Czechoslovakia)	Erik Worm; Roderich Menzel	6; 3	2; 6	4; 6	1; 6
5	(Denmark) (Czechoslovakia)	Einer Ulrich; Ladislav Hecht	3; 6	2; 6	2; 6

== Final ==
=== Czechoslovakia vs. Great Britain ===
Czechoslovakia
1
Prague, Czechoslovakia
9–11 July 1931
Clay

Great Britain
4

			1	2	3	4	5
1	(Czechoslovakia) (United Kingdom)	Roderich Menzel; Bunny Austin	6; 3	2; 6	8; 6	3; 6	3; 6
2	(Czechoslovakia) (United Kingdom)	Ladislav Hecht; Fred Perry	1; 6	6; 8	3; 6
3	(Czechoslovakia) (United Kingdom)	Ferenc Maršálek / Roderich Menzel; Pat Hughes / Fred Perry	4; 6	6; 4	4; 6	2; 6
4	(Czechoslovakia) (United Kingdom)	Ladislav Hecht; Bunny Austin	6; 2	7; 5	6; 4
5	(Czechoslovakia) (United Kingdom)	Roderich Menzel; Fred Perry	5; 7	3; 6	5; 7
