= 1934 International Lawn Tennis Challenge Europe Zone =

International tennis competition

Details
- Duration: 28 July 1933 – 3 September 1933 (Qualifying draw); 18 May 1934 – 15 July 1934 (Main draw)
- Teams: 10 (Main draw)
- Categories: 1934 Europe Zone; 1934 America Zone

Champion
- Winning nation: Australia; Qualified for: 1934 Inter-Zonal Final

The Europe Zone was one of the two regional zones of the 1934 International Lawn Tennis Challenge.

10 teams entered the Europe Zone, with the winner going on to compete in the Inter-Zonal Final against the winner of the America Zone. Due to the large number of entries in Europe, a "Qualifying Round" system was introduced in order to better manage the number of teams competing. European teams which lost before the 1933 Europe Zone semifinals would play-off against each other for the right to compete in the 1934 Europe Zone main draw alongside the 1933 Europe Zone semifinalists and other non-European teams. 17 teams entered the Qualifying Rounds.

Australia defeated Czechoslovakia in the final, and went on to face the United States in the Inter-Zonal Final.

== Qualifying draw ==
European teams which lost in the first round, second round or quarterfinals of the 1933 Europe Zone competed in the new qualifying round for four places in the 1934 Europe Zone main draw.

=== Draw ===
First Round
Brussels, Belgium
Belgium	3
Hungary	2

Second Round
Dublin, Ireland (grass)
Ireland	1
Germany	4
Copenhagen, Denmark
Denmark	4
Greece	1
Oslo, Norway (clay)
Norway	0
Yugoslavia	5
Vienna, Austria
Austria	5
Spain	0
Stockholm, Sweden
Sweden	2
Belgium	3
Monte Carlo, Monaco
Monaco	1
Switzerland	4
Warsaw, Poland
Poland	2
Italy	3
Noordwijk, Netherlands (clay)
Netherlands	4
Romania	1

Qualifying Round
Leipzig, Germany
Germany	5
Denmark	0
Zagreb, Yugoslavia
Yugoslavia	1
Austria	4
Montreux, Switzerland
Belgium	2
Switzerland	3
Scheveningen, Netherlands (clay)
Italy	3
Netherlands	2

- Germany, Austria, Switzerland and Italy advance to the 1934 Europe Zone main draw.

=== First round ===
==== Belgium vs. Hungary ====
Belgium
3
Brussels, Belgium
28–30 July 1933

Hungary
2

			1	2	3	4	5
1	(Belgium) (Hungary)	André Lacroix; Béla von Kehrling	6; 1	7; 5	6; 2
2	(Belgium) (Hungary)	Léopold de Borman; Emil Gábori	0; 6	5; 7	2; 6
3	(Belgium) (Hungary)	Léopold de Borman / André Lacroix; Emil Gábori / Béla von Kehrling	2; 6	6; 1	7; 5	3; 6	6; 4
4	(Belgium) (Hungary)	André Lacroix; Emil Gábori	6; 4	6; 4	6; 2
5	(Belgium) (Hungary)	Léopold de Borman; Béla von Kehrling	5; 7	3; 6	4; 6

=== Second round ===
==== Ireland vs. Germany ====
Ireland
1
Fitzwilliam Lawn Tennis Club, Dublin, Ireland
21–24 July 1933
Grass

Germany
4

			1	2	3	4	5
1	(Republic of Ireland) (Germany)	George Lyttleton-Rogers; Gottfried von Cramm	1; 6	4; 6	4; 6
2	(Republic of Ireland) (Germany)	Edward McGuire; Eberhard Nourney	1; 6	6; 1	4; 6	3; 6
3	(Republic of Ireland) (Germany)	Edward McGuire / George McVeagh; Gottfried von Cramm / Eberhard Nourney	7; 5	2; 6	3; 6	4; 6
4	(Republic of Ireland) (Germany)	Edward McGuire; Gottfried von Cramm	4; 6	4; 6	2; 6
5	(Republic of Ireland) (Germany)	George McVeagh; Friedrich Frenz	6; 4	6; 3	6; 4

==== Denmark vs. Greece ====
Denmark
4
Copenhagen, Denmark
11–13 August 1933

Greece
1

			1	2	3	4	5
1	(Denmark) (Greece)	Anker Jacobsen; Lazaros Stalios	4; 6	6; 3	3; 6	6; 2	6; 4
2	(Denmark) (Greece)	Einer Ulrich; Stefanos Xydis	6; 4	4; 6	12; 10	4; 6	1; 6
3	(Denmark) (Greece)	Anker Jacobsen / Einer Ulrich; Lazaros Stalios / Stefanos Xydis	7; 5	4; 6	6; 3	7; 5
4	(Denmark) (Greece)	Anker Jacobsen; Stefanos Xydis	6; 1	6; 3	6; 3
5	(Denmark) (Greece)	Einer Ulrich; Lazaros Stalios	6; 4	6; 1	6; 3

==== Norway vs. Yugoslavia ====
Norway
0
Oslo, Norway
18–20 August 1933
Clay

Yugoslavia
5

			1	2	3	4	5
1	(Norway) (Kingdom of Yugoslavia)	Johan Haanes; Franjo Punčec	1; 6	0; 6	6; 3	4; 6
2	(Norway) (Kingdom of Yugoslavia)	Finn-Trygve Smith; Franjo Kukuljević	1; 6	1; 6	1; 6
3	(Norway) (Kingdom of Yugoslavia)	Johan Haanes / Ragnar Hagen; Franjo Kukuljević / Franjo Punčec	3; 6	4; 6	2; 6
4	(Norway) (Kingdom of Yugoslavia)	Finn-Trygve Smith; Franjo Punčec	5; 7	3; 6	9; 7	4; 6
5	(Norway) (Kingdom of Yugoslavia)	Johan Haanes; Franjo Kukuljević	2; 6	6; 4	1; 6	2; 6

==== Austria vs. Spain ====
Austria
5
Vienna, Austria
14–16 July 1933

Spain
0

			1	2	3	4	5
1	(Austria) (Spain)	Hermann von Artens; Enrique Maier	7; 9	6; 3	2; 6	7; 5	6; 2
2	(Austria) (Spain)	Franz-Wilhelm Matejka; Arturo Suqué	6; 0	6; 3	9; 7
3	(Austria) (Spain)	Wilhelm Brosch / Georg von Metaxa; Alberto Durall / Enrique Maier	6; 8	6; 4	6; 4	2; 6	6; 3
4	(Austria) (Spain)	Franz-Wilhelm Matejka; Alberto Durall	6; 3	6; 1	8; 10	6; 3
5	(Austria) (Spain)	Hermann von Artens; Arturo Suqué	6; 3	4; 6	6; 4	4; 6	6; 4

==== Sweden vs. Belgium ====
Sweden
2
Slottsbanorna, Djursholm, Sweden
12–14 August 1933
Clay

Belgium
3

			1	2	3	4	5
1	(Sweden) (Belgium)	Curt Östberg; André Lacroix	5; 7	3; 6	6; 2	7; 5	6; 8
2	(Sweden) (Belgium)	Harry Ramberg; Guy van Zuylen	6; 2	6; 4	6; 3
3	(Sweden) (Belgium)	Curt Östberg / Harry Ramberg; Léopold de Borman / André Lacroix	7; 5	5; 7	5; 7	2; 6
4	(Sweden) (Belgium)	Curt Östberg; Guy van Zuylen	6; 3	6; 4	10; 8
5	(Sweden) (Belgium)	Harry Ramberg; André Lacroix	3; 6	4; 6	3; 6

==== Monaco vs. Switzerland ====
Monaco
1
Monte Carlo, Monaco
18–20 August 1933

Switzerland
4

			1	2	3	4	5
1	(Monaco) (Switzerland)	René Gallèpe; Hector Fisher	3; 6	3; 6	1; 6
2	(Monaco) (Switzerland)	Vladimir Landau; Max Ellmer	2; 6	3; 6	2; 6
3	(Monaco) (Switzerland)	René Gallèpe / Vladimir Landau; Charles Aeschlimann / Werner Steiner	6; 4	3; 6	6; 3	6; 4
4	(Monaco) (Switzerland)	Vladimir Landau; Hector Fisher	2; 6	1; 6	3; 6
5	(Monaco) (Switzerland)	Gaston Médécin; Max Ellmer	1; 6	2; 6	1; 6

==== Poland vs. Italy ====
Poland
2
Warsaw, Poland
4–6 August 1933

Italy
3

			1	2	3	4	5
1	(Poland) (Italy)	Józef Hebda; Emanuele Sertorio	7; 5	6; 0	6; 0
2	(Poland) (Italy)	Ignacy Tłoczyński; Giorgio de Stefani	3; 6	6; 2	2; 6	5; 7
3	(Poland) (Italy)	Józef Hebda / Ernest Wittmann; Emanuele Sertorio / Valentino Taroni	2; 6	2; 6	6; 3	6; 2	4; 6
4	(Poland) (Italy)	Józef Hebda; Giorgio de Stefani	2; 6	3; 6	6; 0	6; 4	2; 6
5	(Poland) (Italy)	Ignacy Tłoczyński; Emanuele Sertorio	6; 2	4; 6	6; 3	6; 4

==== Netherlands vs. Romania ====
Netherlands
4
Noordwijk, Netherlands
11–13 August 1933
Clay

Romania
1

			1	2	3	4	5
1	(Netherlands) (Romania)	Hendrik Timmer; Constantin Cantacuzino	6; 1	6; 1	6; 1
2	(Netherlands) (Romania)	Willem Karsten; Gică Poulieff	3; 6	6; 2	8; 6	6; 8	4; 6
3	(Netherlands) (Romania)	Gerard Scheurleer / Hendrik Timmer; Constantin Cantacuzino / Gică Poulieff	6; 3	6; 3	6; 0
4	(Netherlands) (Romania)	Hendrik Timmer; Gică Poulieff	6; 0	6; 0	6; 3
5	(Netherlands) (Romania)	Willem Karsten; Constantin Cantacuzino	6; 2	10; 8	0; 6	8; 6

=== Qualifying round ===
==== Germany vs. Denmark ====
Germany
5
Leipzig, Germany
1–3 September 1933

Denmark
0

			1	2	3	4	5
1	(Germany) (Denmark)	Friedrich Frenz; Einer Ulrich	6; 4	7; 5	0; 6	6; 3
2	(Germany) (Denmark)	Gottfried von Cramm; Anker Jacobsen	2; 6	6; 3	6; 3	12; 10
3	(Germany) (Denmark)	Gottfried von Cramm / Eberhard Nourney; Povl Henriksen / Einer Ulrich	6; 3	8; 6	7; 5
4	(Germany) (Denmark)	Gottfried von Cramm; Einer Ulrich	6; 3	6; 4	6; 3
5	(Germany) (Denmark)	Friedrich Frenz; Anker Jacobsen	0; 6	3; 6	7; 5	6; 3	6; 3

==== Yugoslavia vs. Austria ====
Yugoslavia
1
Zagreb, Yugoslavia
27–29 August 1933

Austria
4

			1	2	3	4	5
1	(Kingdom of Yugoslavia) (Austria)	Franjo Punčec; Hermann von Artens	5; 7	6; 8	1; 6
2	(Kingdom of Yugoslavia) (Austria)	Franjo Kukuljević; Franz-Wilhelm Matejka	6; 8	5; 7	4; 6
3	(Kingdom of Yugoslavia) (Austria)	Franjo Kukuljević / Franjo Punčec; Hermann von Artens / Georg von Metaxa	6; 2	0; 6	6; 4	7; 5
4	(Kingdom of Yugoslavia) (Austria)	Franjo Punčec; Franz-Wilhelm Matejka	4; 6	1; 6	4; 6
5	(Kingdom of Yugoslavia) (Austria)	Franjo Kukuljević; Hermann von Artens	3; 6	2; 6	6; 4	6; 3	0; 6

==== Switzerland vs. Belgium ====
Switzerland
3
Montreux, Switzerland
1–3 September 1933

Belgium
2

			1	2	3	4	5
1	(Switzerland) (Belgium)	Hector Fisher; André Lacroix	6; 2	3; 6	6; 2	6; 2
2	(Switzerland) (Belgium)	Max Ellmer; Charles Naeyaert	6; 2	3; 6	7; 5	7; 5
3	(Switzerland) (Belgium)	Charles Aeschlimann / Hector Fisher; Léopold de Borman / André Lacroix	4; 6	3; 6	4; 6
4	(Switzerland) (Belgium)	Hector Fisher; Charles Naeyaert	6; 2	6; 2	6; 3
5	(Switzerland) (Belgium)	Max Ellmer; André Lacroix	6; 3	6; 0	0; 6	3; 6	2; 6

==== Netherlands vs. Italy ====
Netherlands
2
Scheveningen, Netherlands
18–20 August 1933
Clay

Italy
3

			1	2	3	4	5
1	(Netherlands) (Italy)	Hendrik Timmer; Giorgio de Stefani	9; 11	7; 5	6; 4	2; 6	2; 6
2	(Netherlands) (Italy)	Willem Karsten; Augusto Rado	1; 6	3; 6	1; 6
3	(Netherlands) (Italy)	Ody Koopman / Gerard Scheurleer; Ferruccio Quintavalle / Valentino Taroni	6; 4	6; 1	2; 6	6; 3
4	(Netherlands) (Italy)	Hendrik Timmer; Augusto Rado	5; 7	6; 1	6; 1	6; 1
5	(Netherlands) (Italy)	Willem Karsten; Giorgio de Stefani	3; 6	2; 6	1; 6

== Main draw ==
=== Draw ===
First Round
Australia
bye
Japan
bye
Germany
bye
Paris, France (clay)
France	5
Austria	0
Lucerne, Switzerland
Switzerland	5
India	0
bye
Italy
bye
Czechoslovakia
bye
New Zealand

Quarterfinals; 7–10 June
Eastbourne, England (grass)
Australia	4
Japan	1
Paris, France (clay)
Germany	2
France	3
Rome, Italy (clay)
Switzerland	0
Italy	5
Prague, Czechoslovakia
Czechoslovakia	4
New Zealand	1

Semifinals; 15–17 June
Paris, France (clay)
Australia	3
France	2
Milan, Italy (clay)
Italy	2
Czechoslovakia	3

Final; 13–15 July
Prague, Czechoslovakia (clay)
Australia	3
Czechoslovakia	2

=== First round ===
==== France vs. Austria ====
France
5
Stade Roland Garros, Paris, France
18–20 May 1934
Clay

Austria
0

			1	2	3	4	5
1	(France) (Austria)	Christian Boussus; Franz-Wilhelm Matejka	6; 1	6; 1	6; 4
2	(France) (Austria)	André Merlin; Georg von Metaxa	4; 6	8; 6	6; 2	6; 2
3	(France) (Austria)	Jean Borotra / Jacques Brugnon; Hermann von Artens / Georg von Metaxa	4; 6	6; 3	6; 3	6; 4
4	(France) (Austria)	Christian Boussus; Georg von Metaxa	7; 5	6; 3	6; 3
5	(France) (Austria)	André Merlin; Franz-Wilhelm Matejka	6; 3	3; 6	6; 2	6; 2

==== Switzerland vs. India ====
Switzerland
5
Lucerne, Switzerland
18–20 May 1934

India
0

			1	2	3	4	5
1	(Switzerland) (India)	Max Ellmer; Mohammed Sleem	1; 6	6; 2	6; 3	6; 0
2	(Switzerland) (India)	Hector Fisher; Man-Mohan Bhandari	6; 1	6; 2	7; 5
3	(Switzerland) (India)	Hector Fisher / Werner Steiner; Man-Mohan Bhandari / A.E. Browne	6; 3	6; 0	6; 1
4	(Switzerland) (India)	Hector Fisher; Mohammed Sleem	6; 4	6; 2	6; 4
5	(Switzerland) (India)	Max Ellmer; Man-Mohan Bhandari	6; 0	6; 2	6; 2

=== Quarterfinals ===
==== Australia vs. Japan ====
Australia
4
Devonshire Park Lawn Tennis Club, Eastbourne, England
7–9 June 1934
Grass

Japan
1

			1	2	3	4	5
1	(Australia) (Japan)	Vivian McGrath; Jiro Yamagishi	2; 6	7; 5	6; 2	6; 4
2	(Australia) (Japan)	Jack Crawford; Jiro Fujikura	6; 3	6; 3	11; 9
3	(Australia) (Japan)	Jack Crawford / Adrian Quist; Hideo Nishimura / Jiro Yamagishi	6; 1	6; 0	4; 6	9; 7
4	(Australia) (Japan)	Don Turnbull; Jiro Yamagishi	6; 4	7; 5	9; 7
5	(Australia) (Japan)	Vivian McGrath; Jiro Fujikura	4; 6	7; 5	2; 6	6; 8

==== France vs. Germany ====
France
3
Stade Roland Garros, Paris, France
8–10 June 1934
Clay

Germany
2

			1	2	3	4	5
1	(France) (Germany)	André Merlin; Gottfried von Cramm	1; 6	9; 7	2; 6	5; 7
2	(France) (Germany)	Christian Boussus; Eberhard Nourney	6; 1	6; 2	6; 2
3	(France) (Germany)	Jean Borotra / Jacques Brugnon; Gottfried von Cramm / Hans Denker	5; 7	6; 2	6; 4	10; 8
4	(France) (Germany)	André Merlin; Eberhard Nourney	6; 4	7; 5	6; 2
5	(France) (Germany)	Christian Boussus; Gottfried von Cramm	1; 6	0; 6	6; 0	4; 6

==== Italy vs. Switzerland ====
Italy
5
Rome, Italy
8–10 June 1934
Clay

Switzerland
0

			1	2	3	4	5
1	(Italy) (Switzerland)	Giorgio de Stefani; Max Ellmer	6; 3	6; 3	6; 3
2	(Italy) (Switzerland)	Augusto Rado; Hector Fisher	6; 1	6; 0	11; 9
3	(Italy) (Switzerland)	Ferruccio Quintavalle / Valentino Taroni; Charles Aeschlimann / Werner Steiner	0; 6	0; 6	6; 3	6; 3	6; 4
4	(Italy) (Switzerland)	Giorgio de Stefani; Hector Fisher	6; 3	6; 2	6; 3
5	(Italy) (Switzerland)	Augusto Rado; Max Ellmer	6; 4	6; 2	6; 4

==== Czechoslovakia vs. New Zealand ====
Czechoslovakia
4
Prague, Czechoslovakia
7–9 June 1934

New Zealand
1

			1	2	3	4	5
1	(Czechoslovakia) (New Zealand)	Ladislav Hecht; Cam Malfroy	6; 4	6; 1	4; 6	6; 1
2	(Czechoslovakia) (New Zealand)	Roderich Menzel; Eskell Andrews	6; 1	6; 3	6; 3
3	(Czechoslovakia) (New Zealand)	Ladislav Hecht / Roderich Menzel; Cam Malfroy / Alan Stedman	5; 7	4; 6	5; 7
4	(Czechoslovakia) (New Zealand)	Ladislav Hecht; Eskell Andrews	6; 1	6; 1	6; 0
5	(Czechoslovakia) (New Zealand)	Roderich Menzel; Cam Malfroy	6; 2	6; 0	6; 1

=== Semifinals ===
==== France vs. Australia ====
France
2
Stade Roland Garros, Paris, France
15–17 June 1934
Clay

Australia
3

			1	2	3	4	5
1	(France) (Australia)	Christian Boussus; Vivian McGrath	3; 6	6; 0	8; 6	2; 6	2; 6
2	(France) (Australia)	André Merlin; Jack Crawford	4; 6	6; 4	6; 4	6; 2
3	(France) (Australia)	Jean Borotra / Jacques Brugnon; Jack Crawford / Adrian Quist	3; 6	4; 6	7; 5	6; 4	3; 6
4	(France) (Australia)	Christian Boussus; Jack Crawford	6; 2	2; 6	6; 4	4; 6	0; 6
5	(France) (Australia)	André Merlin; Vivian McGrath	4; 6	6; 2	6; 3	6; 0

==== Italy vs. Czechoslovakia ====
Italy
2
Milan, Italy
15–17 June 1934
Clay

Czechoslovakia
3

			1	2	3	4	5
1	(Italy) (Czechoslovakia)	Giorgio de Stefani; Ladislav Hecht	6; 3	7; 5	1; 6	6; 2
2	(Italy) (Czechoslovakia)	Augusto Rado; Roderich Menzel	1; 6	2; 6	8; 10
3	(Italy) (Czechoslovakia)	Ferruccio Quintavalle / Augusto Rado; Ferenc Maršálek / Roderich Menzel	8; 6	3; 6	0; 6	4; 6
4	(Italy) (Czechoslovakia)	Giorgio de Stefani; Roderich Menzel	0; 6	7; 5	6; 2	5; 7	6; 3
5	(Italy) (Czechoslovakia)	Augusto Rado; Ladislav Hecht	2; 6	6; 8	2; 6

=== Final ===
==== Czechoslovakia vs. Australia ====
Czechoslovakia
2
Prague, Czechoslovakia
13–15 July 1934
Clay

Australia
3

			1	2	3	4	5
1	(Czechoslovakia) (Australia)	Roderich Menzel; Vivian McGrath	10; 8	6; 2	8; 6
2	(Czechoslovakia) (Australia)	Ladislav Hecht; Jack Crawford	4; 6	2; 6	2; 6
3	(Czechoslovakia) (Australia)	Ladislav Hecht / Roderich Menzel; Jack Crawford / Adrian Quist	4; 6	3; 6	4; 6
4	(Czechoslovakia) (Australia)	Roderich Menzel; Jack Crawford	6; 4	6; 4	2; 6	8; 6
5	(Czechoslovakia) (Australia)	Ladislav Hecht; Vivian McGrath	6; 3	2; 6	1; 6	5; 7
