= 1933 International Lawn Tennis Challenge America Zone =

The America Zone was one of the two regional zones of the 1933 International Lawn Tennis Challenge.

9 teams entered the America Zone: 4 teams competed in the North & Central America Zone, while 5 teams competed in the South America Zone. The winner of each sub-zone would play against each other to determine who moved to the Inter-Zonal Final to compete against the winner of the Europe Zone.

The United States defeated Canada in the North & Central America Zone final, and Argentina defeated Chile in the South America Zone final. In the Americas Inter-Zonal Final, the United States defeated Argentina and went on to face Great Britain in the Inter-Zonal Final.

== North & Central America Zone ==
=== Draw ===
Semifinals; 5–13 May
Mexico City, Mexico (clay)
United States	5
Mexico	0
Hot Springs, VA, United States (hard)
Cuba	1
Canada	4

Final; 18–20 May
Montreal, Canada (grass)
United States	5
Canada	0

=== Semifinals ===
==== Mexico vs. United States ====
Mexico
0
Club Deportivo Chapultepec, Mexico City, Mexico
5–7 May 1933
Clay

United States
5

			1	2	3	4	5
1	(Mexico) (United States)	Ricardo Tapia; Wilmer Allison	6; 4	3; 6	4; 6	4; 6
2	(Mexico) (United States)	Esteban Reyes; Cliff Sutter	1; 6	0; 6	1; 6
3	(Mexico) (United States)	Eduardo Mestre / Alfonso Unda; George Lott / John Van Ryn	0; 6	1; 6	5; 7
4	(Mexico) (United States)	Ricardo Tapia; Cliff Sutter	1; 6	6; 3	5; 7	6; 2	1; 6
5	(Mexico) (United States)	Eduardo Mestre; Wilmer Allison	0; 6	7; 9	2; 6

==== Canada vs. Cuba ====
Canada
4
Hot Springs, VA, United States
11–13 May 1933
Hard

Cuba
1

			1	2	3	4	5
1	(Canada) (Cuba)	Gilbert Nunns; Lorenzo Nodarse	6; 1	6; 2	6; 0
2	(Canada) (Cuba)	Jack Wright; Ricardo Morales	8; 6	2; 6	6; 1	6; 2
3	(Canada) (Cuba)	Marcel Rainville / Jack Wright; Ricardo Morales / Arturo Randin	6; 4	6; 0	4; 6	8; 10	4; 6
4	(Canada) (Cuba)	Jack Wright; Lorenzo Nodarse	6; 1	6; 2	6; 1
5	(Canada) (Cuba)	Gilbert Nunns; Ricardo Morales	8; 6	6; 2	6; 4

=== Final ===
==== Canada vs. United States ====
Canada
0
Mount Royal Tennis Club, Montreal, Canada
18–20 May 1933
Grass

United States
5

			1	2	3	4	5
1	(Canada) (United States)	Jack Wright; Wilmer Allison	2; 6	5; 7	2; 6
2	(Canada) (United States)	Gilbert Nunns; Ellsworth Vines	3; 6	1; 6	3; 6
3	(Canada) (United States)	Marcel Rainville / Jack Wright; George Lott / John Van Ryn	1; 6	3; 6	3; 6
4	(Canada) (United States)	Gilbert Nunns; Wilmer Allison	4; 6	6; 8	4; 6
5	(Canada) (United States)	Jack Wright; Ellsworth Vines	5; 7	3; 6	5; 7

== South America Zone ==
=== Draw ===
Quarterfinals
Brazil
Chile	w/o
Uruguay
bye
bye
Peru
bye
Argentina

Semifinals; 31 March–2 April
Montevideo, Uruguay
Chile	5
Uruguay	0
Peru
Argentina	w/o

Final; 8–10 April
Buenos Aires, Argentina (clay)
Chile	0
Argentina	4

=== Semifinals ===
==== Uruguay vs. Chile ====
Uruguay
0
Montevideo, Uruguay
31 March–2 April 1933

Chile
5

			1	2	3	4	5
1	(Uruguay) (Chile)	Ernesto Hernández Erro; Elias Deik	2; 6	1; 6	0; 6
2	(Uruguay) (Chile)	Eduardo Stanham; Salvador Deik	7; 5	0; 6	3; 6	3; 6
3	(Uruguay) (Chile)	Juan Carlos da Silva / Eduardo Stanham; Salvador Deik / Egon Schonherr	4; 6	6; 8	3; 6
4	(Uruguay) (Chile)	Eduardo Stanham; Elias Deik	2; 6	2; 6	2; 6
5	(Uruguay) (Chile)	José Francisco Galcerán; Egon Schonherr	2; 6	2; 6	3; 6

=== Final ===
==== Argentina vs. Chile ====
Argentina
4
Buenos Aires Lawn Tennis Club, Buenos Aires, Argentina
8–10 April 1933
Clay

Chile
0

			1	2	3	4	5
1	(Argentina) (Chile)	Américo Cattaruzza; Elias Deik	6; 2	6; 8	6; 3	3; 6	6; 2
2	(Argentina) (Chile)	Guillermo Robson; Salvador Deik	6; 1	6; 3	6; 1
3	(Argentina) (Chile)	Lucilo del Castillo / Adriano Zappa; Salvador Deik / Egon Schonherr	6; 4	6; 2	6; 3
4	(Argentina) (Chile)	Guillermo Robson; Elias Deik	6; 1	6; 1	7; 9	6; 2
5	(Argentina) (Chile)	Américo Cattaruzza; Salvador Deik	6; 1	2; 6	6; 6			not completed

== Americas Inter-Zonal Final ==
=== United States vs. Argentina ===
United States
4
Chevy Chase Lawn Tennis Club, Chevy Chase, MD, United States
25–27 May 1933
Clay

Argentina
0

			1	2	3	4	5
1	(United States) (Argentina)	Ellsworth Vines; Adriano Zappa	6; 2	6; 3	6; 4
2	(United States) (Argentina)	Wilmer Allison; Américo Cattaruzza	6; 2	6; 4	6; 3
3	(United States) (Argentina)	George Lott / John Van Ryn; Adelmar Echeverria / Adriano Zappa	6; 1	6; 4	6; 1
4	(United States) (Argentina)	Ellsworth Vines; Américo Cattaruzza	7; 5	6; 1	5; 7	6; 1
5	(United States) (Argentina)	Wilmer Allison; Adriano Zappa	6; 2	6; 1	2; 2			not completed
