= 1931 International Lawn Tennis Challenge America Zone =

The America Zone was one of the two regional zones of the 1931 International Lawn Tennis Challenge.

Due to an increase in South American entries, the America Zone was split into the North & Central America Zone and the South America Zone. The winner of each sub-zone would play against each other to determine who moved to the Inter-Zonal Final to compete against the winner of the Europe Zone. 8 teams entered the America Zone: 3 teams competed in the North & Central America Zone, while 5 teams competed in the South America Zone.

The United States defeated Canada in the North & Central America Zone final, and Argentina defeated Chile in the South America Zone final. In the Americas Inter-Zonal Final, the United States defeated Argentina and went on to face Great Britain in the Inter-Zonal Final.

== North & Central America Zone ==
=== Draw ===
Semifinals; 1–3 May
Mexico City, Mexico (clay)
United States	5
Mexico	0
bye
Canada

Final; 21–23 May
Montreal, Canada (grass)
United States	4
Canada	1

=== Semifinals ===
==== Mexico vs. United States ====
Mexico
0
Club Deportivo Chapultepec, Mexico City, Mexico
1–3 May 1931
Clay

United States
5

			1	2	3	4	5
1	(Mexico) (United States)	Alfonso Unda; Wilmer Allison	3; 6	1; 6	3; 6
2	(Mexico) (United States)	Ricardo Tapia; Frank Shields	4; 6	4; 6	2; 6
3	(Mexico) (United States)	Manuel Llano / Ricardo Tapia; Frank Shields / Sidney Wood	3; 6	3; 6	4; 6
4	(Mexico) (United States)	Jorge Acosta; Frank Shields	3; 6	0; 6	3; 6
5	(Mexico) (United States)	Ricardo Tapia; Wilmer Allison	4; 6	3; 6	2; 6

=== Final ===
==== Canada vs. United States ====
Canada
1
Mount Royal Tennis Club, Montreal, Canada
21–23 May 1931
Grass

United States
4

			1	2	3	4	5
1	(Canada) (United States)	Jack Wright; Frank Shields	6; 8	2; 6	2; 6
2	(Canada) (United States)	Marcel Rainville; Sidney Wood	4; 6	6; 4	6; 3	2; 6	6; 4
3	(Canada) (United States)	Marcel Rainville / Jack Wright; Frank Shields / Sidney Wood	6; 8	4; 6	2; 6
4	(Canada) (United States)	Jack Wright; Sidney Wood	6; 8	3; 6	4; 6
5	(Canada) (United States)	Marcel Rainville; Frank Shields	1; 6	4; 6	1; 6

== South America Zone ==
=== Draw ===
Quarterfinals; 26–28 March
Asunción, Paraguay (hard)
Paraguay	0
Argentina	5
Uruguay
bye
bye
Brazil
bye
Chile

Semifinals; 2–4 April
Buenos Aires, Argentina (clay)
Argentina	5
Uruguay	0
Brazil
Chile	w/o

Final; 24–26 April
Santiago, Chile
Argentina	3
Chile	0

=== Quarterfinals ===
==== Paraguay vs. Argentina ====
Paraguay
0
Asunción, Paraguay
26–28 March 1931
Hard

Argentina
5

			1	2	3	4	5
1	(Paraguay) (Argentina)	Agustin Cusmanich; Lucilo del Castillo	3; 6	0; 6	2; 6
2	(Paraguay) (Argentina)	Ángel Portaluppi; Adriano Zappa	1; 6	1; 6	1; 6
3	(Paraguay) (Argentina)	Agustin Cusmanich / Licio Sosa; Guillermo Robson / Andrés Sissener	0; 6	3; 6	0; 6
4	(Paraguay) (Argentina)	H.R. Walters; Lucilo del Castillo	0; 6	0; 6	1; 6
5	(Paraguay) (Argentina)	Ivo Ubaldi; Adriano Zappa	2; 6	0; 6	1; 6

=== Semifinals ===
==== Argentina vs. Uruguay ====
Argentina
5
Buenos Aires Lawn Tennis Club, Buenos Aires, Argentina
2–4 April 1931
Clay

Uruguay
0

			1	2	3	4	5
1	(Argentina) (Uruguay)	Lucilo del Castillo; Juan Carlos da Silva	6; 1	6; 2	6; 0
2	(Argentina) (Uruguay)	Ronaldo Boyd; Eduardo Stanham	6; 2	6; 1	6; 3
3	(Argentina) (Uruguay)	Guillermo Robson / Adriano Zappa; Juan Carlos da Silva / Eduardo Stanham	6; 1	6; 2	6; 1
4	(Argentina) (Uruguay)	Lucilo del Castillo; Carlos Gainza	6; 0	6; 0	6; 1
5	(Argentina) (Uruguay)	Ronaldo Boyd; Ernesto Hernandez Erro	6; 0	6; 0	6; 1

=== Final ===
==== Chile vs. Argentina ====
Chile
0
Santiago, Chile
24–26 April 1931

Argentina
3

			1	2	3	4	5
1	(Chile) (Argentina)	Egon Schonherr; Adriano Zappa	6; 2	2; 6	0; 6	0; 6
2	(Chile) (Argentina)	Lionel Page; Guillermo Robson	2; 6	2; 6	4; 6
3	(Chile) (Argentina)	Roberto Conrads / Herbert Muller; Lucilo del Castillo / Adriano Zappa	1; 6	0; 6	0; 6
4	(Chile) (Argentina)	Lionel Page; Adriano Zappa						not played
5	(Chile) (Argentina)	Egon Schonherr; Guillermo Robson						not played

== Americas Inter-Zonal Final ==
=== United States vs. Argentina ===
United States
5
Chevy Chase Lawn Tennis Club, Chevy Chase, MD, United States
28–30 May 1931
Clay

Argentina
0

			1	2	3	4	5
1	(United States) (Argentina)	Frank Shields; Guillermo Robson	3; 6	6; 2	6; 2	6; 2
2	(United States) (Argentina)	Sidney Wood; Ronaldo Boyd	6; 4	6; 1	6; 2
3	(United States) (Argentina)	Frank Shields / Sidney Wood; Lucilo del Castillo / Adriano Zappa	6; 4	8; 6	2; 6	6; 2
4	(United States) (Argentina)	Frank Shields; Ronaldo Boyd	6; 2	6; 2	6; 2
5	(United States) (Argentina)	Cliff Sutter; Guillermo Robson	3; 6	6; 4	6; 3	6; 3
