= 1934 International Lawn Tennis Challenge America Zone =

Zone in the 1934 International Lawn Tennis Challenge

The America Zone was one of the two regional zones of the 1934 International Lawn Tennis Challenge.

5 teams entered the America Zone: 3 teams competed in the North & Central America Zone, while 2 teams competed in the South America Zone. The winner of each sub-zone would play against each other to determine who moved to the Inter-Zonal Final to compete against the winner of the Europe Zone.

The United States defeated Mexico in the North & Central America Zone final and received a walkover into the Inter-Zonal Final after both Brazil and Peru, the only competing teams in the South America Zone, withdrew.

== North & Central America Zone ==
=== Draw ===
Semifinals; 24–27 May
Wilmington, DE, United States (grass)
United States	5
Canada	0
bye
Mexico

Final; 30 May–1 June
Baltimore, MD, United States (grass)
United States	5
Mexico	0

=== Semifinals ===
==== United States vs. Canada ====
United States
5
Wilmington Country Club, Wilmington, DE, United States
24–27 May 1934
Grass

Canada
0

			1	2	3	4	5
1	(United States) (Canada)	Lester Stoefen; Marcel Rainville	6; 1	7; 5	6; 1
2	(United States) (Canada)	Frank Shields; Walter Martin	6; 2	6; 3	9; 7
3	(United States) (Canada)	George Lott / John Van Ryn; Walter Martin / Marcel Rainville	6; 0	6; 4	6; 0
4	(United States) (Canada)	Lester Stoefen; Gilbert Nunns	6; 4	6; 2	6; 3
5	(United States) (Canada)	Frank Shields; Laird Watt	6; 1	6; 3	6; 4

=== Final ===
==== United States vs. Mexico ====
United States
5
Baltimore Country Club, Baltimore, MD, United States
30 May–1 June 1934
Grass

Mexico
0

			1	2	3	4	5
1	(United States) (Mexico)	Sidney Wood; Esteban Reyes	6; 3	6; 2	6; 2
2	(United States) (Mexico)	Lester Stoefen; Ricardo Tapia	6; 2	6; 3	6; 1
3	(United States) (Mexico)	George Lott / Lester Stoefen; Eduardo Mestre / Ricardo Tapia	6; 4	6; 4	6; 4
4	(United States) (Mexico)	Frank Shields; Ángel Roldán	6; 2	6; 1	6; 2
5	(United States) (Mexico)	Sidney Wood; Ricardo Tapia	6; 4	9; 7	6; 0

== South America Zone ==
=== Draw ===
Final
Brazil	w/o
Peru

== Americas Inter-Zonal Final ==
=== United States vs. Brazil ===
United States defeated Brazil by walkover.
