= Edward McGuire (painter) =

Irish painter (1932–1986)

Edward McGuire, Self-portrait, 1954

Edward McGuire (10 April 1932 – 26 November 1986) was an Irish painter.

== Biography ==
The Irish portraitist, still-life artist and bird painter Edward McGuire was born in Dublin on 10 April 1932. He was the third eldest of two sons and two daughters of Edward McGuire, a businessman and sportsman, and Bridget McGuire (née Neary), of Newry, County Down.

He studied painting, drawing and the history of art at the Accademia di belle arti di Roma in 1953 and at the Slade School of Fine Art in 1954. In the early 1950s he befriended artists and writers such as Patrick Swift (who encouraged McGuire to paint), Anthony Cronin and Lucian Freud (Slade). He travelled in France and Italy from 1951 to 1953 and lived on the Aran Islands off County Galway from 1955 to 1956. From then until his death in November 1986, he resided in Dublin with his wife Sara (Sally) McGuire who died in May 2011.

== Exhibitions ==
Edward McGuire's paintings were widely exhibited during his lifetime. He had solo shows at the Dawson Gallery, Dublin (A Recent Painting, 1969); Taylor Galleries, Dublin (1983), and a retrospective at the Royal Hibernian Academy Gallagher Gallery (1991). In addition, he exhibited in such group art shows as: Irish Exhibition of Living Art (1953–1971); Royal Hibernian Academy (1962–1986); Hendriks Gallery, Dublin (1970); Hugh Lane Municipal Gallery of Modern Art (1971); Ulster Museum, Belfast (1973); Oireachtas (1973–1980); Cagnes-sur-Mer 6th International Festival of Painting (1974); Concours pour le Prix de Portrait Paul-Louis Weiller, Academie des Beaux-Arts, Paris (1979). All this, notwithstanding, McGuire used a laboriously meticulous painting technique which led to the completion of only about six works of art a year. McGuire's keen interest in bird painting stemmed from the association in his youth with a taxidermist at the Natural History Museum in Dublin. McGuire purchased three stuffed specimens from Mr Williams, starting a bird collection whose members he painted repeatedly in intricate detail throughout his career.

== Portraits ==
Edward McGuire was a prolific portrait artist and painted over 25 portraits of poets and writers. He first exhibited at the Royal Hibernian Academy (RHA) in 1962 and became an academician in 1978. His subjects included: Séamus Heaney (1974), Pearse Hutchinson (1970), Michael Hartnett (1971), Anthony Cronin (1977), John Jordan, Seán Ó Faoláin (1978), Ulick O'Connor (1978), James White (1981), John Montague (1983) and Liam Cosgrave (1982).

== Awards ==
A member of Aosdána from 1984, McGuire won numerous awards during his distinguished career, including the 1974 Festival International de la Peinture, Cagnes-sur-Mer; the Douglas Hyde Gold Medal (1976) and the Marten Toonder Award (1978). He received an honourable mention in the Concours Paul-Louis Weiller (1979). His paintings are held in many private and public collections, including: the Ulster Museum, Belfast; the National Gallery of Ireland; the Hugh Lane Municipal Gallery of Modern Art in Dublin; The National Museum; Trinity College Dublin;University College Dublin; University College Cork; Dublin City University. Among his awards were the Prix National from the Cagnes-sur-Mer 6th International Festival of Painting (1974); the Douglas Hyde Gold Medal (1976); the RHA Award (1976), and the Marten Toonder Award (1978). He received an honourable mention in the Concours Paul-Louis Weiller (1979).

== Collections ==
His work is included in the collections of the Limerick City Gallery of Art, Limerick; Ulster Museum, Belfast; the National Gallery of Ireland; the Hugh Lane Municipal Gallery of Modern Art in Dublin; National Museum of Ireland; Trinity College Dublin; University College Dublin; University College Cork; PJ Carroll and Co., Dublin City University, Dublin Writers Museum and the Irish Museum of Modern Art.
