= 1933 International Lawn Tennis Challenge =

1933 edition of the International Lawn Tennis Challenge

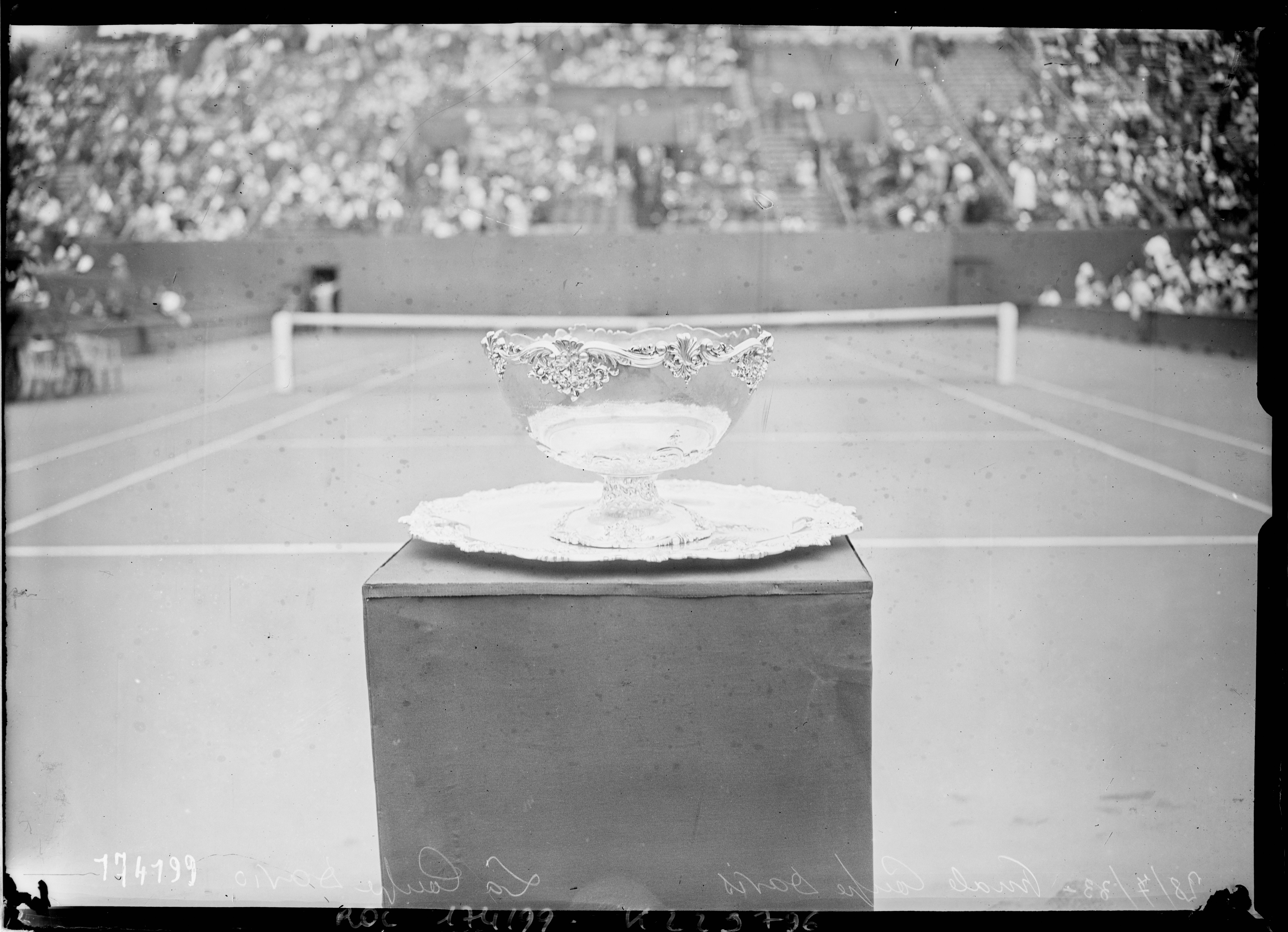
- Day of the final, Paris

Details
- Duration: 31 March – 30 July 1933
- Edition: 28th
- Teams: 31

Champion
- Winning nation: Great Britain

The 1933 International Lawn Tennis Challenge was the 28th edition of what is now known as the Davis Cup. 24 teams would enter the Europe Zone; while 9 would enter the Americas Zone, 4 in North America and 5 in South America.

The United States defeated Argentina in the America Inter-Zonal Final, and Great Britain defeated Australia in the Europe Zone final. In the Inter-Zonal play-off Great Britain defeated United States, and went on to defeat France in the Challenge Round. Great Britain's victory ended France's six-year run as champions and gave the Great Britain team their first title since 1912. The final was played at Stade Roland Garros in Paris on 28–30 July.

== America Zone ==
=== North & Central America Zone ===
Semifinals; 5–13 May
Mexico City, Mexico (clay)
United States	5
Mexico	0
Hot Springs (hard)
Cuba	1
Canada	4

Final; 18–20 May
Montreal, Quebec (grass)
United States	5
Canada	0

=== South America Zone ===
Quarterfinals
Brazil
Chile	w/o
Uruguay
bye
bye
Peru
bye
Argentina

Semifinals; 31 March–2 April
Montevideo, Uruguay
Chile	5
Uruguay	0
Peru
Argentina	w/o

Final; 8–10 April
Buenos Aires, Argentina (clay)
Chile	0
Argentina	4

=== Americas Inter-Zonal final ===
United States vs. Argentina

United States
4
Chevy Chase Lawn Tennis Club, Chevy Chase, Maryland
25–27 May 1933
Clay

Argentina
0

			1	2	3	4	5
1	(United States) (Argentina)	Ellsworth Vines; Adriano Zappa	6; 2	6; 3	6; 4
2	(United States) (Argentina)	Wilmer Allison; Américo Cattaruzza	6; 2	6; 4	6; 3
3	(United States) (Argentina)	George Lott / John Van Ryn; Adelmar Echeverria / Adriano Zappa	6; 1	6; 4	6; 1
4	(United States) (Argentina)	Ellsworth Vines; Américo Cattaruzza	7; 5	6; 1	5; 7	6; 1
5	(United States) (Argentina)	Wilmer Allison; Adriano Zappa	6; 2	6; 1	2; 2			not completed

== Europe Zone ==
=== Draw ===
First Round; 21 April–9 May
Greece
bye
Romania
bye
Czechoslovakia
bye
Monaco
bye
Finland	w/o
India
Spain	1
Great Britain	4
Italy	4
Yugoslavia	1
Belgium	2
Austria	3
Denmark	2
Ireland	3
Hungary	0
Japan	5
Germany	5
Egypt	0
Netherlands	3
Poland	2
bye
Switzerland
bye
South Africa
bye
Norway
bye
Australia

Second Round; 12–21 May
Athens, Greece
Greece	4
Romania	1
Prague, Czechoslovakia
Czechoslovakia	5
Monaco	0
London, England (clay)
Finland	0
Great Britain	5
Genoa, Italy (clay)
Italy	4
Austria	1
Dublin, Ireland (grass)
Ireland	0
Japan	5
Berlin, Germany
Germany	4
Netherlands	1
Basel, Switzerland
Switzerland	1
South Africa	4
Oslo, Norway (clay)
Norway	0
Australia	5

Quarterfinals; 8–13 June
Prague, Czechoslovakia
Greece	0
Czechoslovakia	5
Eastbourne, England (grass)
Great Britain	4
Italy	1
Berlin, Germany (clay)
Japan	4
Germany	1
London, England (grass)
South Africa	2
Australia	3

Semifinals; 17–20 June
Eastbourne, England (grass)
Czechoslovakia	0
Great Britain	5
Paris, France (clay)
Japan	2
Australia	3

Final; 13–15 July
Wimbledon, England (grass)
Great Britain	3
Australia	2

=== Final ===
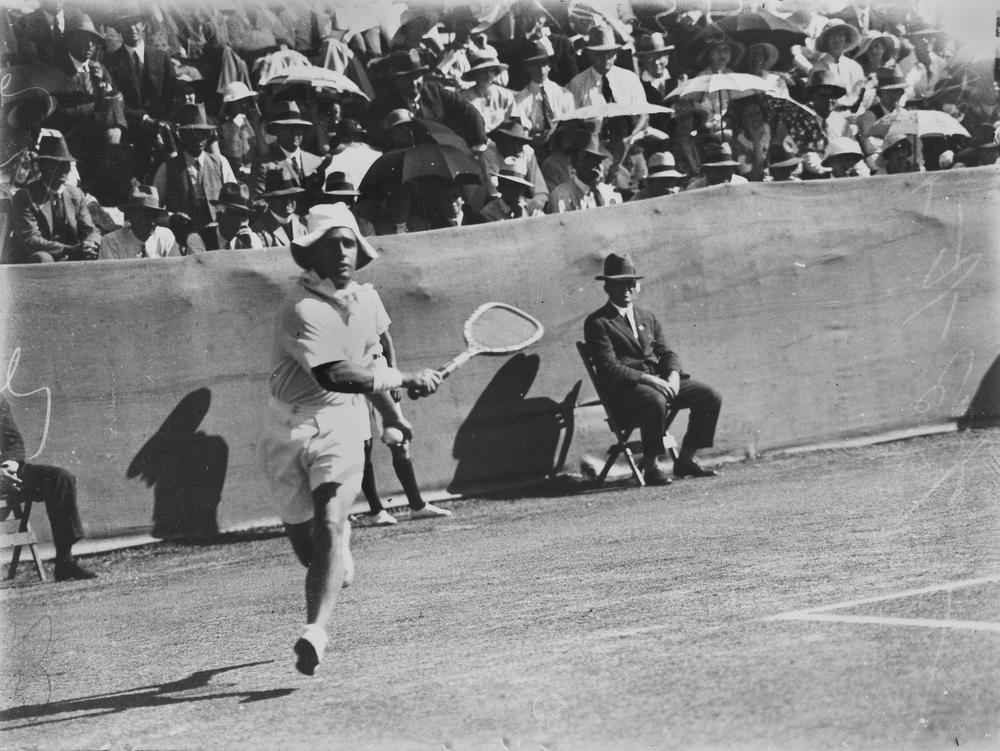
Quist at Wimbledon, 13 July 1933

Great Britain vs. Australia

Great Britain
3
Centre Court, All England Club, Wimbledon, England
13–15 July 1933
Grass

Australia
2

			1	2	3	4	5
1	(United Kingdom) (Australia)	Bunny Austin; Jack Crawford	6; 4	2; 6	2; 6	3; 6
2	(United Kingdom) (Australia)	Fred Perry; Vivian McGrath	6; 2	6; 4	6; 2
3	(United Kingdom) (Australia)	Pat Hughes / Fred Perry; Adrian Quist / Don Turnbull	7; 5	6; 4	3; 6	6; 3
4	(United Kingdom) (Australia)	Bunny Austin; Vivian McGrath	6; 4	7; 5	6; 3
5	(United Kingdom) (Australia)	Harry Lee; Jack Crawford	6; 8	5; 7	4; 6

== Inter-Zonal final ==
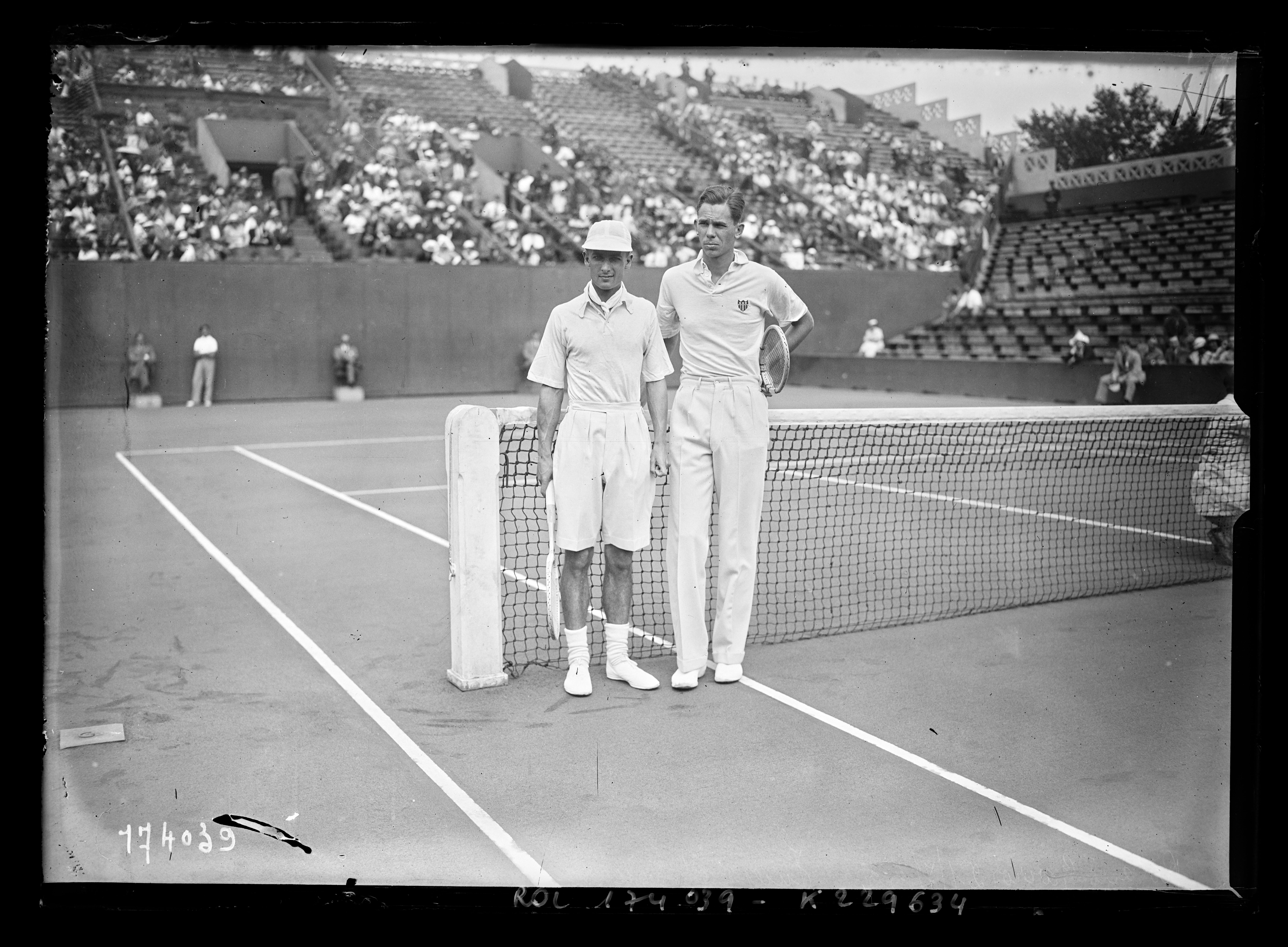
Austin and Vines, 21 July 1933 in Paris

Great Britain vs. United States

Great Britain
4
Stade Roland Garros, Paris, France
21–23 July 1933
Clay

United States
1

			1	2	3	4	5
1	(United Kingdom) (United States)	Bunny Austin; Ellsworth Vines	6; 1	6; 1	6; 4
2	(United Kingdom) (United States)	Fred Perry; Wilmer Allison	6; 1	7; 5	6; 4
3	(United Kingdom) (United States)	Pat Hughes / Fred Perry; George Lott / John Van Ryn	6; 8	4; 6	1; 6
4	(United Kingdom) (United States)	Bunny Austin; Wilmer Allison	6; 2	7; 9	6; 3	6; 4
5	(United Kingdom) (United States)	Fred Perry; Ellsworth Vines	1; 6	6; 0	4; 6	7; 5	7; 6	retired

== Challenge Round ==
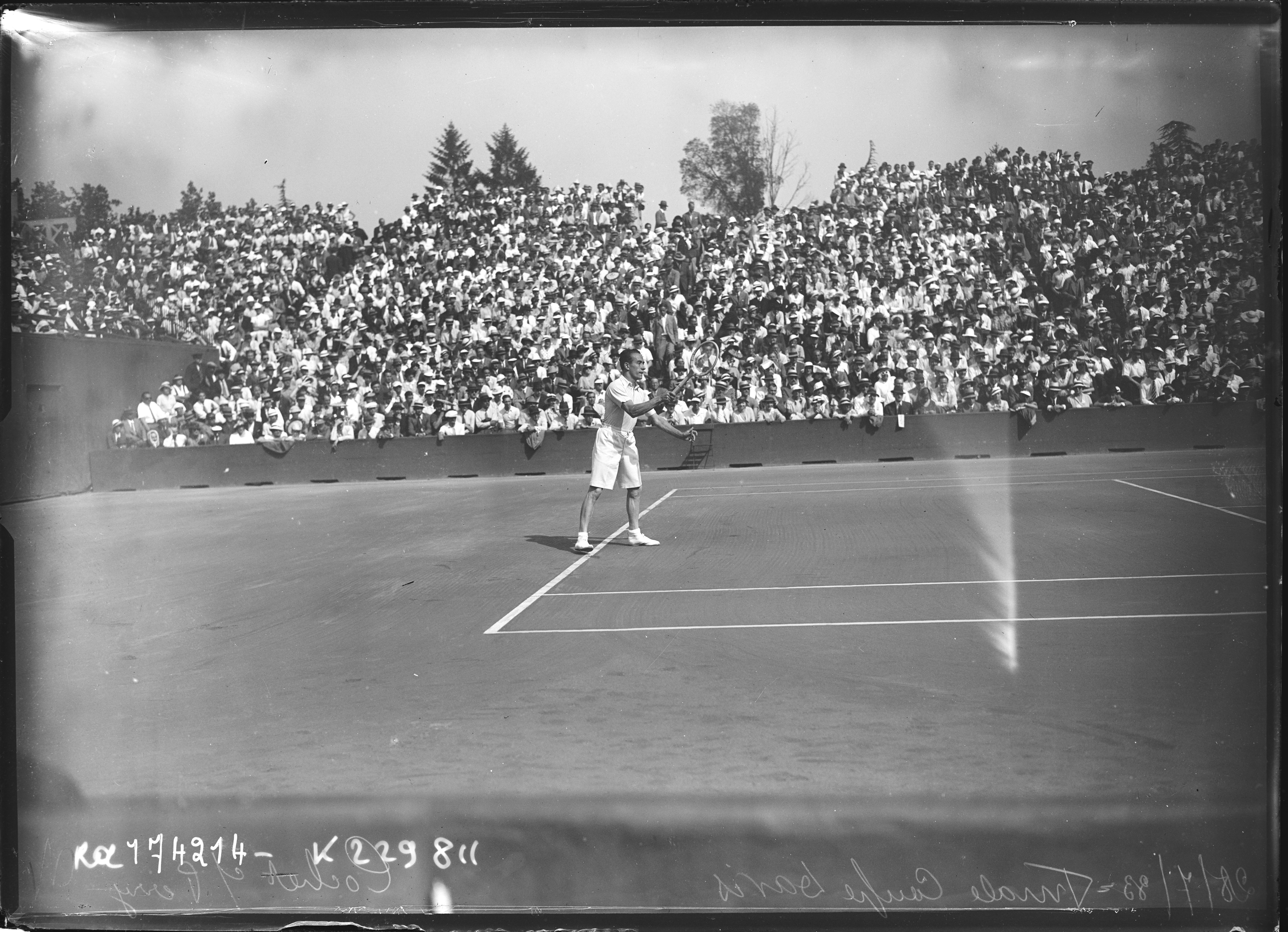
Cochet vs Perry, 28 July 1933 in Paris

France vs. Great Britain

France
2
Stade Roland Garros, Paris, France
28–30 July 1933
Clay

Great Britain
3

			1	2	3	4	5
1	(France) (United Kingdom)	André Merlin; Bunny Austin	3; 6	4; 6	0; 6
2	(France) (United Kingdom)	Henri Cochet; Fred Perry	10; 8	4; 6	6; 8	6; 3	1; 6
3	(France) (United Kingdom)	Jean Borotra / Jacques Brugnon; Pat Hughes / Harry Lee	6; 3	8; 6	6; 2
4	(France) (United Kingdom)	Henri Cochet; Bunny Austin	5; 7	6; 4	4; 6	6; 4	6; 4
5	(France) (United Kingdom)	André Merlin; Fred Perry	6; 4	6; 8	2; 6	5; 7

== See also ==
- 1933 Wightman Cup
