= Jan van der Heide =

Dutch tennis player (1908–1959)

- Full name: Johan Frederik Willem van der Heiden
- Country (sports): Netherlands
- Born: 9 April 1908 Amsterdam, Netherlands
- Died: 6 March 1959 (aged 50) Amsterdam, Netherlands

Grand Slam singles results
- Wimbledon: 1R (1930)

Grand Slam doubles results
- Wimbledon: 1R (1930)

Grand Slam mixed doubles results
- Wimbledon: 2R (1930)

Team competitions
- Davis Cup: Europe 2R (1931)

Johan Frederik Willem "Jan" van der Heide (Dutch pronunciation: [ˈjɑɱ vɑn dər ˈɦɛidə]; 9 April 1908 – 6 March 1959) was a Dutch tennis player. He was the fifth-ranked Dutch player in 1928, third in 1930 and second in 1932. He was a one-time national singles, doubles and mixed doubles champion.

== Tennis career ==
In 1928 van der Heide substituted for Arthur Diemer Kool in the international team competition between Queensland and the Netherlands in Noordwijk, where he lost to Jack Cummings in five sets.

In 1929 he was enlisted in the annual Belgium-Netherlands Cup, where he helped his squad with significant upsets over Léopold de Borman, André Laloux and the duo of Laloux-Guy van Zuylen.

In 1930, he lost in the first round at Wimbledon to Victor Cazalet, 2–6, 2–6, 5–7. In mixed doubles he lost to Bill Tilden and Cilly Aussem. In September at the Dutch International doubles championships, he and van Olst were defeated by eventual runners-up Hendrik Timmer and Diemer-Kool. In the same month he participated in the international match against Belgium, where he overcame de Borman-Van Zuylen in singles but lost in doubles to them, and also the second doubles to André Lacroix and Georges François. Also in September he competed in a Japan-Holland Davis Cup preparation match against Takeichi Harada, but the Japanese veteran proved to be the better player.

In May 1931 at the Davis Cup, in his only tie, he was defeated in the second round in both the singles and the men's doubles, in which he partnered with Aad Knappert. In September he won the Dutch National Championship, his first and only national title. Although he was drafted to the official Davis Cup team once, he represented the Netherlands against the Monaco Davis Cup team that year, where he supplied the only victory of his team when René Gallepe was forced to give up the match after three sets due to his rheumatic problems.

In 1935 with Straub, van der Heide won the mixed doubles at the Dutch national championships against Hans van Swol and Meyer.

In November 1936 he and van Olst met van Swol and Hughen in the Championship match of the R.A.I.- Gebouw club of Amsterdam but gave an easy victory to their opponents. In December at a club competition between Amsterdam and Hamburg, he and van Olst fell to the German duo of Siemssen and Bruns.

In July 1937 at the Noordwijk Internationals in doubles play he teamed with van Olst to reach the semifinals, where they were stopped by Gallepe and Hall. In the Dutch national championships two months later, he was eliminated in the quarterfinals of the doubles pairing, again with van Olst, and in the same round in the mixed contest with Mechel.

In 1939 in the Amsterdam tournament doubles final, van der Heide and his partner faced the team of van Swol-Hughen but lost in straights.

In 1940 at the Amsterdam championships he was a doubles finalist with recurring partner van Olst just to drop the deciding set and the match to van Swol-Hughen for the second time. In the mixed doubles he chose van Gülick, with whom he entered the finals.

In July 1941 at the Noordwijk Championships, he clinched the trophy partnering Hans van Swol. In September the Dutch amateurs challenged the professionals and subsequently scored five rubbers while the pros took only one. Heide represented the amateurs with a doubles victory alongside van Swol. The same year he was crowned national doubles champion with van Swol.
