= 1934 International Lawn Tennis Challenge =

1934 edition of the International Lawn Tennis Challenge

Details
- Duration: 14 July 1933 – 31 July 1934
- Edition: 29th
- Teams: 27

Champion
- Winning nation: Great Britain

The 1934 International Lawn Tennis Challenge was the 29th edition of what is now known as the Davis Cup. 10 teams would enter the Europe Zone (with 17 teams taking part in the qualifying rounds), while only 5 would enter the Americas Zone, 3 in North America and 2 in South America. Due to the large number of entries in Europe, a "Qualifying Round" system was introduced in order to better manage the number of teams competing. European teams which lost before the 1933 Europe Zone semifinals would play-off against each other for four spots in the 1934 Europe Zone main draw.

In the America Inter-Zonal Final the United States received a walkover due to Brazil's absence, while in the Europe Zone final Australia defeated Czechoslovakia. The United States defeated Australia in the Inter-Zonal play-off, but would fall to Great Britain in the Challenge Round. The final was played at the All England Club Centre Court in Wimbledon, London, England on 28–31 July.

== America Zone ==
=== North & Central America Zone ===
Semifinals; 24–27 May
Wilmington, DE, United States (grass)
United States	5
Canada	0
bye
Mexico

Final; 30 May–1 June
Baltimore, MD, United States (grass)
United States	5
Mexico	0

=== South America Zone ===
Final
Brazil	w/o
Peru

=== Americas Inter-Zonal Final ===
United States vs. Brazil

United States defeated Brazil by walkover.

== Europe Zone ==
=== Qualifying round ===
First Round
Brussels, Belgium
Belgium	3
Hungary	2

Second Round
Dublin, Ireland (grass)
Ireland	1
Germany	4
Copenhagen, Denmark
Denmark	4
Greece	1
Oslo, Norway (clay)
Norway	0
Yugoslavia	5
Vienna, Austria
Austria	5
Spain	0
Stockholm, Sweden
Sweden	2
Belgium	3
Monte Carlo, Monaco
Monaco	1
Switzerland	4
Warsaw, Poland
Poland	2
Italy	3
Noordwijk, Netherlands (clay)
Netherlands	4
Romania	1

Qualifying Round
Leipzig, Germany
Germany	5
Denmark	0
Zagreb, Yugoslavia
Yugoslavia	1
Austria	4
Montreux, Switzerland
Belgium	2
Switzerland	3
Scheveningen, Netherlands (clay)
Italy	3
Netherlands	2

- Germany, Austria, Switzerland and Italy advance to the 1934 Europe Zone main draw.

=== Main draw ===
First Round
Australia
bye
Japan
bye
Germany
bye
Paris, France (clay)
France	5
Austria	0
Lucerne, Switzerland
Switzerland	5
India	0
bye
Italy
bye
Czechoslovakia
bye
New Zealand

Quarterfinals; 7–10 June
Eastbourne, England (grass)
Australia	4
Japan	1
Paris, France (clay)
Germany	2
France	3
Rome, Italy (clay)
Switzerland	0
Italy	5
Prague, Czechoslovakia
Czechoslovakia	4
New Zealand	1

Semifinals; 15–17 June
Paris, France (clay)
Australia	3
France	2
Milan, Italy (clay)
Italy	2
Czechoslovakia	3

Final; 13–15 July
Prague, Czechoslovakia (clay)
Australia	3
Czechoslovakia	2

=== Final ===
Czechoslovakia vs. Australia

Czechoslovakia
2
Prague, Czechoslovakia
13–15 July 1934
Clay

Australia
3

			1	2	3	4	5
1	(Czechoslovakia) (Australia)	Roderich Menzel; Vivian McGrath	10; 8	6; 2	8; 6
2	(Czechoslovakia) (Australia)	Ladislav Hecht; Jack Crawford	4; 6	2; 6	2; 6
3	(Czechoslovakia) (Australia)	Ladislav Hecht / Roderich Menzel; Jack Crawford / Adrian Quist	4; 6	3; 6	4; 6
4	(Czechoslovakia) (Australia)	Roderich Menzel; Jack Crawford	6; 4	6; 4	2; 6	8; 6
5	(Czechoslovakia) (Australia)	Ladislav Hecht; Vivian McGrath	6; 3	2; 6	1; 6	5; 7

== Inter-Zonal Final ==
United States vs. Australia

United States
3
Centre Court, All England Club, Wimbledon, England
21–25 July 1934
Grass

Australia
2

			1	2	3	4	5
1	(United States) (Australia)	Frank Shields; Jack Crawford	1; 6	2; 6	10; 12
2	(United States) (Australia)	Sidney Wood; Vivian McGrath	5; 7	4; 6	6; 1	7; 9
3	(United States) (Australia)	George Lott / Lester Stoefen; Jack Crawford / Adrian Quist	6; 4	6; 4	2; 6	6; 4
4	(United States) (Australia)	Sidney Wood; Jack Crawford	6; 3	9; 7	4; 6	4; 6	6; 2
5	(United States) (Australia)	Frank Shields; Vivian McGrath	6; 4	6; 2	6; 4

== Challenge Round ==
Great Britain vs. United States

Great Britain
4
Centre Court, All England Club, Wimbledon, England
28–31 July 1934
Grass

United States
1

			1	2	3	4	5
1	(United Kingdom) (United States)	Bunny Austin; Frank Shields	6; 4	6; 4	6; 1
2	(United Kingdom) (United States)	Fred Perry; Sidney Wood	6; 1	4; 6	5; 7	6; 0	6; 3
3	(United Kingdom) (United States)	Pat Hughes / Harry Lee; George Lott / Lester Stoefen	5; 7	0; 6	6; 4	7; 9
4	(United Kingdom) (United States)	Fred Perry; Frank Shields	6; 4	4; 6	6; 2	15; 13
5	(United Kingdom) (United States)	Bunny Austin; Sidney Wood	6; 4	6; 0	6; 8	6; 3

== See also ==
- 1934 Wightman Cup
