= Arne Grahn =

Finnish tennis player (1902–1989)

- Full name: Arne Wilhelm Grahn
- Country (sports): FIN
- Born: 22 January 1902 Helsinki, Finland
- Died: 21 November 1989 (aged 87) Helsinki, Finland
- Turned pro: 1923 (amateur tour)
- Retired: 1939

Singles
- Career titles: 22

Grand Slam singles results
- French Open: 2R (1926)

Arne Wilhelm Grahn (22 January 1902 – 21 November 1989) was a Finnish tennis player. He competed in the men's singles and doubles events at the 1924 Summer Olympics. He won more than 40 Finnish championships between 1920 and 1947.

== Career ==
Grahan played his first tournament in 1923 at the Götheborg Games, the same year won his first singles title at the Finland National Championships an event he would win nine times. he also won the Finland Indoor Championships eight times. He also won the Aix-Les-Bains International in 1926 against Monaco player Rene Gallepe and the St. Raphael International the same year against British player Jack Olmsted.

He played the French championships one time at the 1926 French Championships, but lost in the second round to Belgium's Jean Washer. In 1930 he reached the quarter-finals of the Cannes New Courts Club tournament losing to Bill Tilden. In addition he was also a finalist at the Torneo Circolo Canottieri Roma in 1924. In 1938 he was a losing finalist at the Monte Carlo Championships Consolation tournament. In 1939 he played his final singles tournament at the Monte Carlo Championships.
