= 1931 International Lawn Tennis Challenge =

1931 edition of the International Lawn Tennis Challenge

Details
- Duration: 19 April – 26 July 1931
- Edition: 26th
- Teams: 30

Champion
- Winning nation: France

The 1931 International Lawn Tennis Challenge was the 26th edition of what is now known as the Davis Cup.

Due to an increase in South American entries, the America Zone was split into the North & Central America Zone and the South America Zone, with the winner of each sub-zone playing to determine who moved to the Inter-Zonal round. 22 teams would enter the Europe Zone, while 8 would enter the America Zone. These included first-time entries from Brazil, Paraguay and Uruguay, although Brazil withdrew without playing a tie, and Paraguay would not play in the Davis Cup again until 1982. This year also marked the first time that ties were played in South America.

The United States defeated Argentina in the America Inter-Zonal Final, but would then lose to Great Britain in the Inter-Zonal play-off. France defeated Great Britain in the Challenge Round, giving France their fifth straight title. The final was played at Stade Roland Garros in Paris, France on 24–26 July.

== America Zone ==
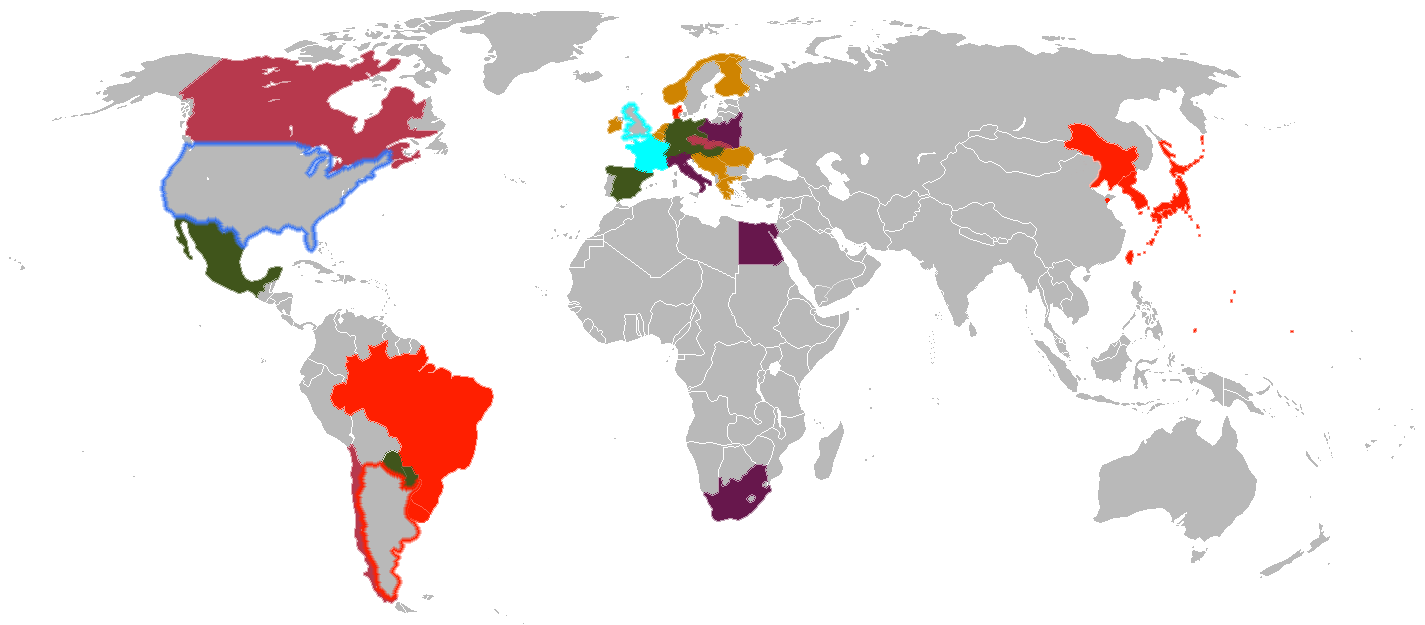
Zones and rounds in the 1931 Davis cup: 1931 champion 1931 runner-up Inter-Zonal Final elimination America Inter-Zonal elimination Regional finals elimination Semifinal elimination Quarterfinal elimination Second round elimination First round elimination

=== North & Central America Zone ===
Semifinals; 1–3 May
Mexico City, Mexico (clay)
United States	5
Mexico	0
bye
Canada

Final; 21–23 May
Montreal, Canada (grass)
United States	4
Canada	1

=== South America Zone ===
Quarterfinals; 26–28 March
Asunción, Paraguay (hard)
Paraguay	0
Argentina	5
Uruguay
bye
bye
Brazil
bye
Chile

Semifinals; 2–4 April
Buenos Aires, Argentina (clay)
Argentina	5
Uruguay	0
Brazil
Chile	w/o

Final; 24–26 April
Santiago, Chile
Argentina	3
Chile	0

=== Americas Inter-Zonal Final ===
United States vs. Argentina

United States
5
Chevy Chase Lawn Tennis Club, Chevy Chase, MD, United States
28–30 May 1931
Clay

Argentina
0

			1	2	3	4	5
1	(United States) (Argentina)	Frank Shields; Guillermo Robson	3; 6	6; 2	6; 2	6; 2
2	(United States) (Argentina)	Sidney Wood; Ronaldo Boyd	6; 4	6; 1	6; 2
3	(United States) (Argentina)	Frank Shields / Sidney Wood; Lucilo del Castillo / Adriano Zappa	6; 4	8; 6	2; 6	4; 2
4	(United States) (Argentina)	Frank Shields; Ronaldo Boyd	6; 2	6; 2	6; 2
5	(United States) (Argentina)	Cliff Sutter; Guillermo Robson	3; 6	6; 4	6; 3	6; 3

== Europe Zone ==
=== Draw ===
First Round; 16 April–5 May
Finland
bye
Egypt
bye
Yugoslavia
bye
Japan
bye
Belgium
bye
Great Britain	5
Monaco	0
Germany	0
South Africa	5
Switzerland	0
Ireland	5
Greece	3
Austria	2
Spain	2
Czechoslovakia	3
Italy	4
Hungary	1
bye
Netherlands
bye
Norway
bye
Poland
bye
Denmark
bye
Romania

Second Round; 8–17 May
Helsinki, Finland
Finland	1
Egypt	4
Zagreb, Yugoslavia
Yugoslavia	0
Japan	5
Brussels, Belgium (clay)
Belgium	0
Great Britain	5
Dublin, Ireland (grass)
South Africa	4
Ireland	1
Athens, Greece
Greece	1
Czechoslovakia	4
Turin, Italy (clay)
Italy	3
Netherlands	0
Oslo, Norway (clay)
Norway	0
Poland	3
Copenhagen, Denmark
Denmark	5
Romania	0

Quarterfinals; 20 May–6 June
Paris, France (clay)
Egypt	0
Japan	5
Eastbourne, England (grass)
Great Britain	5
South Africa	0
Prague, Czechoslovakia
Czechoslovakia	3
Italy	0
Copenhagen, Denmark
Poland	2
Denmark	3

Semifinals; 12–18 June
Eastbourne, England (grass)
Japan	0
Great Britain	5
Copenhagen, Denmark
Czechoslovakia	5
Denmark	0

Final; 9–11 July
Prague, Czechoslovakia (clay)
Great Britain	4
Czechoslovakia	1

=== Final ===
Czechoslovakia vs. Great Britain

Czechoslovakia
1
Prague, Czechoslovakia
9–11 July 1931
Clay

Great Britain
4

			1	2	3	4	5
1	(Czechoslovakia) (United Kingdom)	Roderich Menzel; Bunny Austin	6; 3	2; 6	8; 6	3; 6	3; 6
2	(Czechoslovakia) (United Kingdom)	Ladislav Hecht; Fred Perry	1; 6	6; 8	3; 6
3	(Czechoslovakia) (United Kingdom)	Ferenc Maršálek / Roderich Menzel; Pat Hughes / Fred Perry	4; 6	6; 4	4; 6	2; 6
4	(Czechoslovakia) (United Kingdom)	Ladislav Hecht; Bunny Austin	6; 2	7; 5	6; 4
5	(Czechoslovakia) (United Kingdom)	Roderich Menzel; Fred Perry	5; 7	3; 6	5; 7

== Inter-Zonal Final ==
Great Britain vs. United States

Great Britain
3
Stade Roland Garros, Paris, France
17–19 July 1931
Clay

United States
2

			1	2	3	4	5
1	(United Kingdom) (United States)	Bunny Austin; Sidney Wood	2; 6	6; 0	8; 6	7; 5
2	(United Kingdom) (United States)	Fred Perry; Frank Shields	8; 10	4; 6	2; 6
3	(United Kingdom) (United States)	Pat Hughes / Fred Perry; George Lott / John Van Ryn	1; 6	3; 6	6; 4	3; 6
4	(United Kingdom) (United States)	Fred Perry; Sidney Wood	6; 3	8; 10	6; 3	6; 3
5	(United Kingdom) (United States)	Bunny Austin; Frank Shields	8; 6	6; 3	7; 5

== Challenge Round ==
France vs. Great Britain

France
3
Stade Roland Garros, Paris, France
24–26 July 1931
Clay

Great Britain
2

			1	2	3	4	5
1	(France) (United Kingdom)	Henri Cochet; Bunny Austin	3; 6	11; 9	6; 2	6; 4
2	(France) (United Kingdom)	Jean Borotra; Fred Perry	6; 4	8; 10	0; 6	6; 4	4; 6
3	(France) (United Kingdom)	Jacques Brugnon / Henri Cochet; Pat Hughes / Charles Kingsley	6; 1	5; 7	6; 3	8; 6
4	(France) (United Kingdom)	Jean Borotra; Bunny Austin	5; 7	3; 6	6; 3	5; 7
5	(France) (United Kingdom)	Henri Cochet; Fred Perry	6; 4	1; 6	9; 7	6; 3

== See also ==
- 1931 Wightman Cup
