= Józef Hebda =

Polish tennis player (1906–1975)

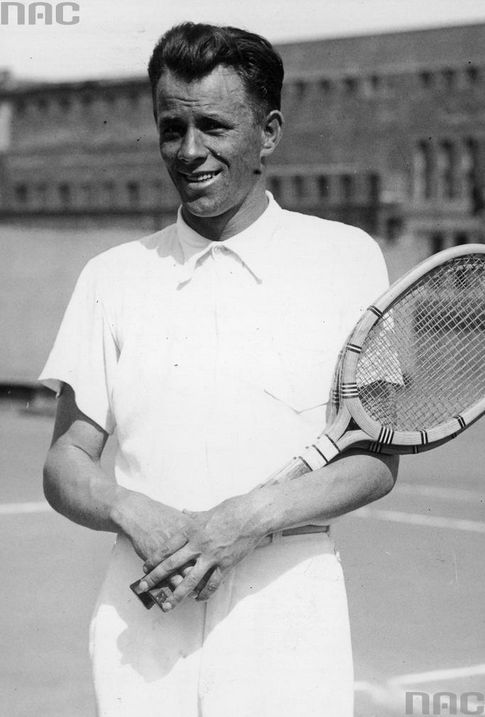
- Full name: Józef Hebda
- Country (sports): POL
- Born: 7 October 1906 Lviv, Poland
- Died: 23 September 1975 (age 68) Kraków, Poland
- Retired: 1951

Singles
- Career titles: 12

Grand Slam singles results
- French Open: 3R (1933, 1937)
- Wimbledon: 2R (1947)

Józef Hebda (7 October 1906 – 23 September 1975) was a Polish tennis player in the 1930s and 1940s.

== Career ==
Hebda began playing tennis seriously at quite an advanced age, over 20 years of age. In 1933 Hebda beat Australian protege Vivian McGrath at the French championships. McGrath "found in Hebda, the Polish champion, a steady baseliner with fine passing shots, who drew him into the net and then steered the ball safely past him." He lost in the last 32 to Frank Wilde. Hebda won his first Polish international championships title in 1932 beating Ignacy Tłoczyński in the final due to "Hebda’s infinitely varied game and his ease in adopting the tactics that suit each opponent". He also won the event in 1937 beating Tloczynski in the final and 1939 beating Tloczynski in the final once again.
