= Edward McGuire (politician) =

Irish businessman, politician and tennis player (1901–1992)

Senator
- In office 14 August 1951 – 23 June 1965
- Constituency: Industrial and Commercial Panel
- In office 21 April 1948 – 14 August 1951
- Constituency: Nominated by the Taoiseach

Personal details
- Born: 28 August 1901 County Waterford, Ireland
- Died: 27 October 1992 (aged 91)
- Party: Independent
- Spouses: Bridget Neary (m. 1926; died 1953); Kathleen Rappalle (m. 1958)
- Children: 4, including Edward
- Relatives: James McGuire (brother)
- Education: University College Dublin (attended)

Edward Augustine McGuire (28 August 1901 – 27 October 1992) was an Irish independent politician, businessman and tennis player.

== Biography ==
He was educated at Clongowes Wood College and Douai School. He enrolled at University College Dublin in 1919, but left after a year to go into business with his father.

He was a member of Seanad Éireann from 1948 to 1965. He was nominated by the Taoiseach to the 6th Seanad in 1948. He was elected to 7th Seanad in 1951 to the Industrial and Commercial Panel, and re-elected in 1954, 1957 and 1961. He lost his seat the 1965 Seanad election.

His father John Francis McGuire was a businessman who bought Brown Thomas department store in Grafton Street, Dublin, in 1933. Under Edward McGuire's direction, the old fashioned business was transformed into the most fashionable store in Dublin. Edward McGuire was managing director and then chairman, until December 1970 when the company was sold to Galen Weston.

In 1926, he married Bridget Neary; and they had four children, one of whom was the painter Edward McGuire. Bridget died in 1953 and Edward married Kathleen Rappalle in 1958.
