= Adriano Zappa =

Argentine tennis player

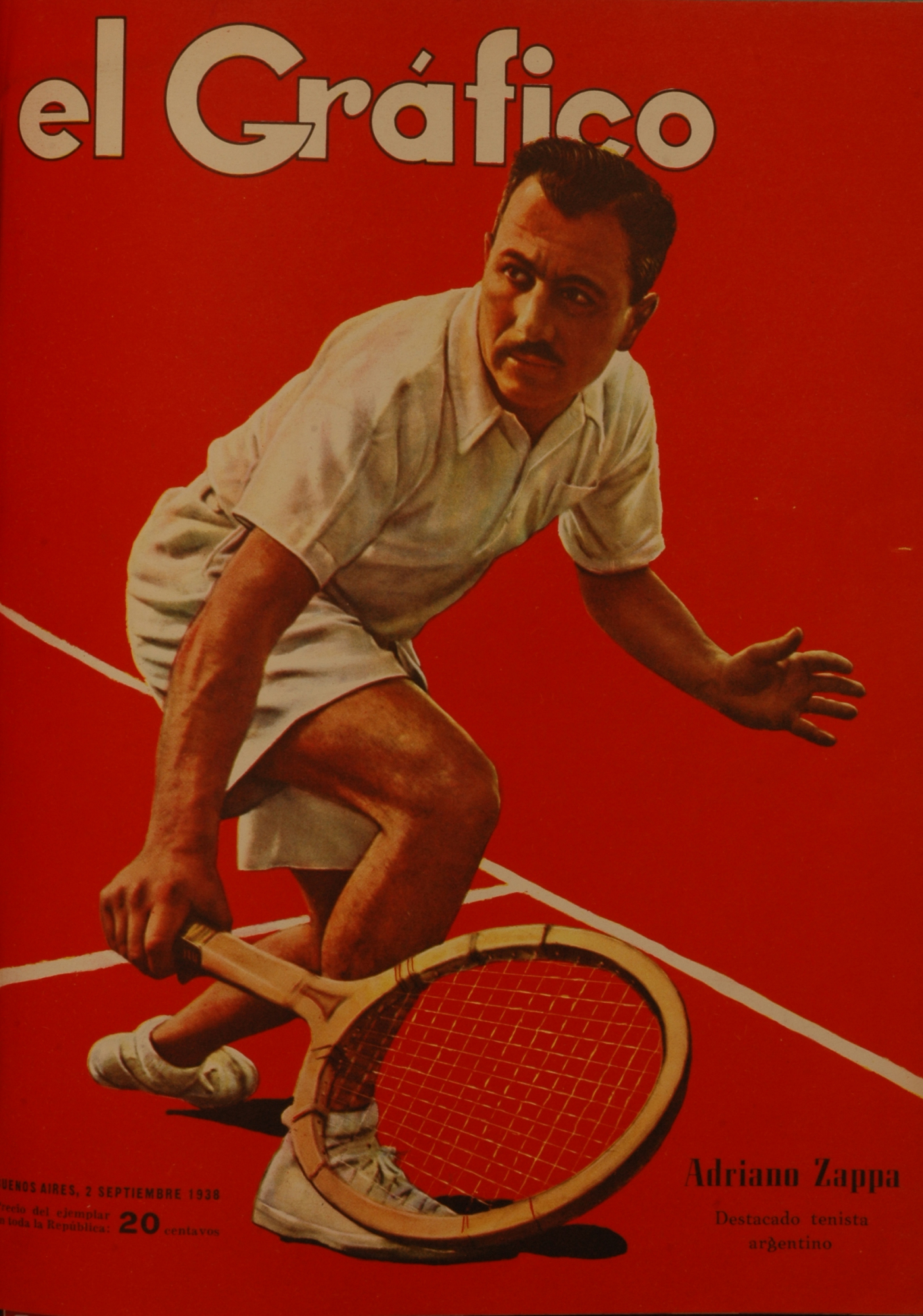
- Zappa on the front page of The Graphic (September 2, 1938)
- Full name: Adriano Publio Elio Zappa
- Country (sports): Argentina
- Born: 7 December 1908 Buenos Aires, Argentina
- Died: Unknown Argentina
- Turned pro: 1926 (amateur tour)
- Retired: 1949
- Plays: right handed

Singles
- Career record: 93-46 (62.41%)
- Career titles: 12

Grand Slam singles results
- French Open: 3R (1936)
- Wimbledon: 1R (1928, 1931, 1936)

Adriano Publio Elio Zappa (7 December 1908 - ? ) was an Argentine tennis player. He competed at both French Championships and Wimbledon Championships a number of times between 1928 and 1936. He was active from 1928 to 1949 and won 12 singles titles.

== Career ==
Zappa played his first tournament in 1928 at the City of Buenos Aires Championships where he reached the final and lost to Ronaldo Boyd.

He won his first tournament in 1932 at the Argentine Championships. He won he last title in 1939 at the Argentine International Grass Court Championships.

He played his last singles event at the Argentina International Championships in 1949.

His other career highlights include winning the Montevideo International in 1934, and Chile International Championships in 1935.

He represented Argentina in Davis Cup matches three times in 1931, 1933 and 1936. He was also team captain in 1933.
