= Bunny Austin =

English tennis player

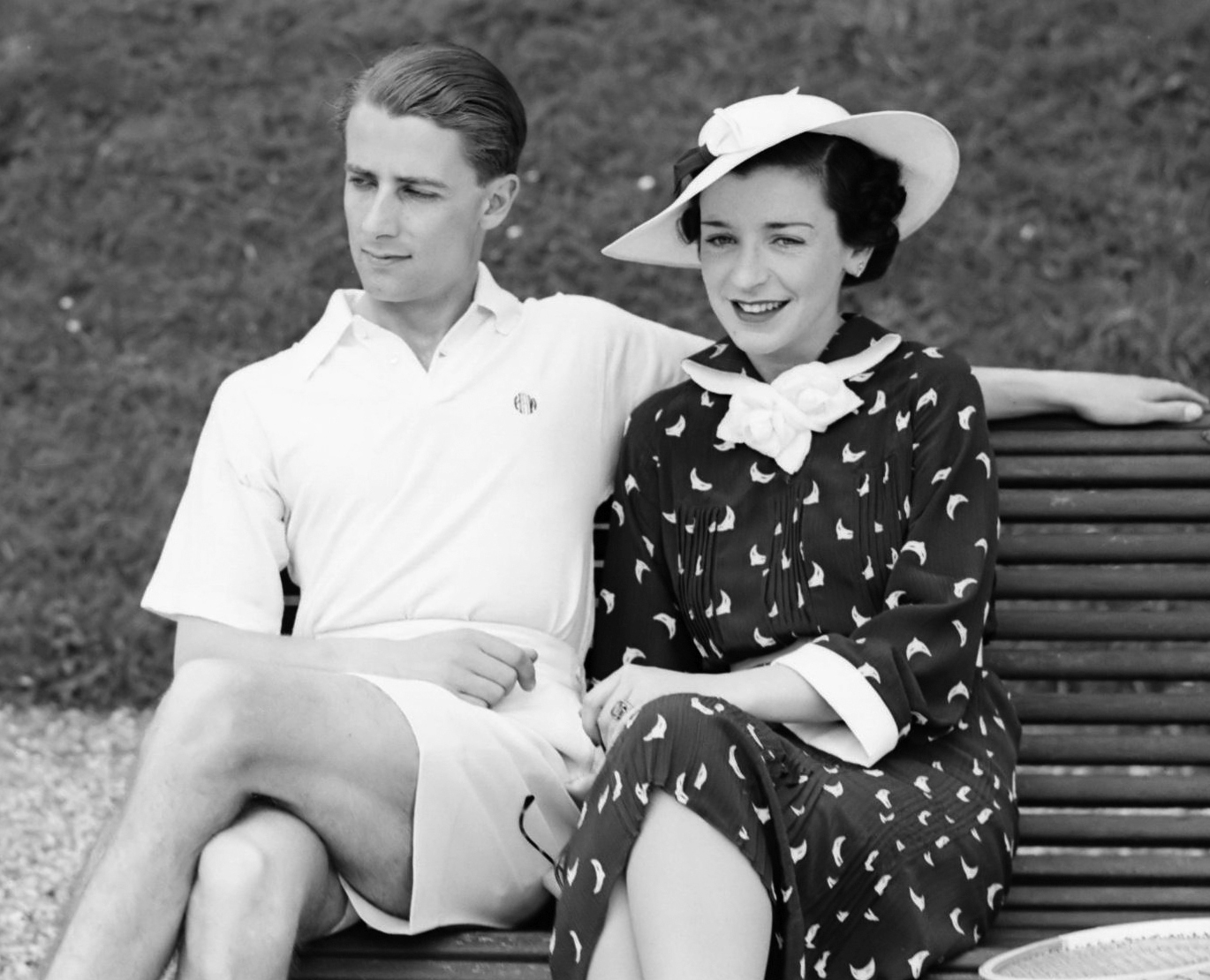
- Bunny Austin with his wife Phyllis Konstam in 1936
- Full name: Henry Wilfred Austin
- Country (sports): Great Britain
- Born: 26 August 1906 London, England
- Died: 26 August 2000 (aged 94) Coulsdon, London, England
- Height: 1.76 m (5 ft 9 in)
- Turned pro: 1926 (amateur tour)
- Retired: 1939
- Plays: Right-handed (1-handed backhand)
- Int. Tennis HoF: 1997 (member page)

Singles
- Career record: 455–108 (80.8%)
- Career titles: 30
- Highest ranking: No. 2 (1931, A. Wallis Myers)

Grand Slam singles results
- Australian Open: QF (1929)
- French Open: F (1937)
- Wimbledon: F (1932, 1938)
- US Open: QF (1929)

Grand Slam doubles results
- Wimbledon: SF (1926)

Grand Slam mixed doubles results
- French Open: F (1931)
- Wimbledon: F (1934)
- US Open: F (1929)

Henry Wilfred "Bunny" Austin (26 August 1906 – 26 August 2000) was an English tennis player. For 74 years he was the last Briton to reach the final of the men's singles at the Wimbledon Championships, until Andy Murray did so in 2012. He was also a finalist at the 1937 French Championships and a championship winner at Queen's Club. Along with Fred Perry, he was a vital part of the British team that won the Davis Cup in three consecutive years (1933–1935). He is also remembered as the first tennis player to wear shorts.

== Early life and education ==
The son of stockjobber Wilfred Austin and his wife Kate, Austin was brought up in South Norwood, London. Austin concluded that the nickname "Bunny", bestowed on him by school friends, came from the Daily Mirror comic strip Pip, Squeak and Wilfred (Wilfred was a rabbit, or bunny). Encouraged by his father, who was determined that he become a sportsman, he joined Norhurst Tennis Club aged six. Austin was educated at Repton School, and studied history at Pembroke College, Cambridge.

== Tennis career ==
While still an undergraduate at Cambridge University, he reached the semi-finals of the men's doubles at Wimbledon in 1926. In 1931, A. Wallis Myers of The Daily Telegraph ranked Austin as the World No. 2. In his first Wimbledon men's singles final in 1932, he was beaten by Ellsworth Vines of the United States in three sets.

In 1932, he decided that the traditional tennis attire, cricket flannels, weighed him down too much. He bought a pair of shorts to use at Forest Hills and subsequently became the first player to wear them at Wimbledon.

Austin reached the quarter finals or better at Wimbledon 10 times. At Wimbledon 1932, Austin beat Frank Shields and Jiro Satoh before losing the final in straight sets to Ellsworth Vines. At the French championships in 1937, Austin beat Yvon Petra before losing to Henner Henkel in the final. At Wimbledon 1938 Austin beat Henkel but won just four games in the final against Don Budge, who was at the peak of his form and went on to win the Grand Slam. He would be the last British man to reach the final of Wimbledon until Andy Murray in 2012. At Wimbledon 1939 Austin was top seed, but lost early. It was his last appearance at Wimbledon.

In the years 1933–1936 he and Fred Perry helped to win the Davis Cup for Britain.

Austin also popularized modern tennis racquet design by using and endorsing the 'Streamline' – a racquet invented by F.W. (Frank Wordsworth) Donisthorpe (patented in Great Britain in 1934) with a shaft that splits into three segments – allowing for aerodynamic movement. The design was manufactured by Hazells and at the time was mocked in the press for looking like a snow shoe. After Austin's retirement, the design was virtually forgotten until the reintroduction of the split shaft in the late 1960s.

== Personal ==
He married actress Phyllis Konstam in 1931, after meeting her in 1929 on a transatlantic liner while travelling for the US Open, and together they were one of the celebrity couples of the age. Austin played tennis with Charlie Chaplin, was a friend of Daphne du Maurier, Ronald Colman, and Harold Lloyd, and met both Queen Mary and President Franklin Delano Roosevelt.

In 1933, concerned by increasing threats of a renewal of European, and indeed wider, war, Austin became involved in the Oxford Group, later Moral Re-Armament, speaking on public platforms and writing press articles. He and Fred Perry were the only players to raise their voice, in a letter to The Times, against the Nazi ban on Jews joining the German team for the Davis Cup. According to Austin's friend Peter Ustinov, Austin was "disgracefully ostracised by the All-England Club because he was a conscientious objector". In fact, soon after British declaration of the Second World War, before the question whether he might register as an objector arose, he accepted an invitation from Frank Buchman, Oxford Group founder, for a speaking tour of the US, and went, with the apparently overt approval of the British government. In 1943, with the extension of US conscription to Allied resident citizens, he was drafted into the US Army Air Force, but a diagnosis of Gilbert's Syndrome (periodic malfunction of the liver) precluded him from combat service, and he was discharged in 1945. The syndrome explained his occasional and sudden fatigue on the court.

When he returned to Britain in 1961, a voting member of the Membership Committee of the All England Club who had been removed from the Cambridge tennis team during Austin's captaincy used Austin's alleged proselytism for the Oxford Group as an excuse for denying him reinstatement in the All-England Club after a lapse of dues payment. Austin's membership of the club was restored in the 1980s by the All England chairman Buzzer Hadingham.

Austin's autobiography, written with his wife, A Mixed Double, was published in 1969.

After a serious fall in 1995, Austin moved to a nursing home in Coulsdon, London. He died in 2000 on his 94th birthday. His grave is in the village churchyard of Stoke St Gregory in Somerset. Just 56 days before his death, Austin had joined other past Wimbledon champions and finalists on Wimbledon's Centre Court for a pre-millennium parade of champions.

Austin was inducted into the International Tennis Hall of Fame at Newport, Rhode Island, in 1997.

A biographical novel was published about Austin in October 2012, by Gregory Wilkin, entitled The Rabbit's Suffering Changes: Based on the True Story of Bunny Austin, the Last British Man—Until Murray—to Play in the Finals of Wimbledon.

His sister Joan Austin was also a tennis player.

== Grand Slam finals ==
=== Singles (Three runners-up) ===
Result	Year	Championship	Surface	Opponent	Score
Loss	1932	Wimbledon Championships	Grass	(United States) Ellsworth Vines	4–6, 2–6, 0–6
Loss	1937	French Championships	Clay	(Germany) Henner Henkel	1–6, 4–6, 3–6
Loss	1938	Wimbledon Championships	Grass	(United States) Don Budge	1–6, 0–6, 3–6

=== Mixed doubles (3 runners-up) ===
Result	Year	Championship	Surface	Partner	Opponents	Score
Loss	1929	U.S. Championships	Grass	(United Kingdom) Phyllis Covell	(United Kingdom) Betty Nuthall (United States) George Lott	3–6, 3–6
Loss	1931	French Championships	Clay	(United Kingdom) Dorothy Shepherd-Barron	(United Kingdom) Betty Nuthall (South Africa) Patrick Spence	3–6, 7–5, 3–6
Loss	1934	Wimbledon	Grass	(United Kingdom) Dorothy Shepherd-Barron	(United Kingdom) Dorothy Round (Japan) Tatsuyoshi Miki	6–3, 4–6, 0–6
