= 1938 Wimbledon Championships – Women's singles =

Women's singles
- 1938 Wimbledon Championships

Final
- Champion: (United States) Helen Moody
- Runner-up: (United States) Helen Jacobs
- Score: 6–4, 6–0

Details
- Draw: 96 (10 Q )
- Seeds: 8

Events
Singles	men	women		boys	girls
Doubles	men	women	mixed	boys	girls
← 1937 ·	Wimbledon Championships	· 1939 →

Helen Moody defeated Helen Jacobs in the final, 6–4, 6–0 to win the ladies' singles tennis title at the 1938 Wimbledon Championships. This was Moody's 19th and last grand slam title, which would remain an all-time record until Margaret Court won her 20th major at the 1970 US Open. Dorothy Round was the defending champion, but did not compete.

== Seeds ==
1. (United States) Helen Moody (champion)
2. (United States) Alice Marble (semifinals)
3. (Poland) Jadwiga Jędrzejowska (quarterfinals)
4. (Denmark) Hilde Sperling (semifinals)
5. (France) Simonne Mathieu (quarterfinals)
6. (United Kingdom) Kay Stammers (quarterfinals)
7. (United States) Sarah Fabyan (quarterfinals)
8. (United Kingdom) Peggy Scriven (fourth round)

Click on the seed number of a player to go to their draw section.

== Draw ==
=== Key ===
- Q = Qualifier
- WC = Wild card
- LL = Lucky loser
- Alt = Alternate
- SE = Special exempt
- PR = Protected ranking
- ITF = ITF entry
- JE = Junior exempt
- w/o = Walkover
- r = Retired
- d = Defaulted
- SR = Special ranking

=== Finals ===
Quarterfinals
2	(United States) Alice Marble	6	6
5	(France) Simonne Mathieu	2	3
3	(Poland) Jadwiga Jędrzejowska	2	3
(United States) Helen Jacobs	6	6
7	(United States) Sarah Fabyan	6	4	4
4	(Denmark) Hilde Sperling	4	6	6
6	(United Kingdom) Kay Stammers	2	1
1	(United States) Helen Moody	6	6

Semifinals
2	(United States) Alice Marble	4	4
(United States) Helen Jacobs	6	6
4	(Denmark) Hilde Sperling	10	4
1	(United States) Helen Moody	12	6

Final
(United States) Helen Jacobs	4	0
1	(United States) Helen Moody	6	6

=== Top half ===
==== Section 1 ====
First round

Second round
2	(United States) Alice Marble	6	6
(United States) Mary Cootes	0	2
(Denmark) Else Hollis	4	5
(South Africa) Sheila Piercey	6	7
(United Kingdom) Mary Hardwick	6	6
(Australia) Joan Hartigan	4	2
(United Kingdom) Alex McKelvie	6	6
(Czechoslovakia) Greta Deutschová	0	2

Third round
2	(United States) A Marble	6	6
(South Africa) S Piercey	4	0
(United Kingdom) M Hardwick	6	6
(United Kingdom) A McKelvie	3	3

Fourth round
2	(United States) A Marble	7	6
(United Kingdom) M Hardwick	5	4

==== Section 2 ====
First round

Second round
5	(France) Simonne Mathieu	6	6
(Chile) Anita Lizana	4	4
Q	(United Kingdom) Eileen Porter	7	2	3
(United Kingdom) Gaby Curtis	5	6	6
(Germany) Rosl Kraus	6	1	6
(United Kingdom) Patsy O'Connell	3	6	3
(United Kingdom) Elsie Pittman	3	0
(Australia) Nancye Wynne	6	6

Third round
5	(France) S Mathieu	6	6
Q	(United Kingdom) G Curtis	0	3
(Austria) R Kraus	3	5
(Australia) N Wynne	6	7

Fourth round
5	(France) S Mathieu	1	6	6
(Australia) N Wynne	6	2	0

==== Section 3 ====
First round
3	(Poland) Jadwiga Jędrzejowska	6	3	6
(Australia) Dorothy Stevenson	1	6	3
(United Kingdom) Denise Huntbach	4	2
(United Kingdom) Phyllis King	6	6
Q	(United Kingdom) Nora Maingay	5	2
Q	(United Kingdom) Betty Cooke	7	6
(United Kingdom) Penny Durlac	6	6
(United Kingdom) Olga MacInnes	4	4
(South Africa) Margaret Morphew	3	6	6
(United Kingdom) Rosemary Smith	6	2	0
(United Kingdom) Yvonne Law	5	6	2
(United Kingdom) Ermyntrude Harvey	7	2	6
(Australia) Margaret Wilson	2	3
(United Kingdom) Susan Noel	6	6
(Canada) Jean Milne	2	5
(Hungary) Margit Paksy	6	7

Second round
3	(Poland) J Jędrzejowska	6	4	6
(United Kingdom) P King	2	6	4
Q	(United Kingdom) B Cooke	6	1	4
(United Kingdom) P Durlac	2	6	6
(South Africa) M Morphew	6	9
(United Kingdom) E Harvey	3	7
(United Kingdom) S Noel	7	6
(Hungary) M Paksy	5	3

Third round
3	(Poland) J Jędrzejowska	6	6
(United Kingdom) P Durlac	1	3
(South Africa) M Morphew	3	6	6
(United Kingdom) S Noel	6	2	3

Fourth round
3	(Poland) J Jędrzejowska	6	6
(South Africa) M Morphew	3	2

==== Section 4 ====
First round
8	(United Kingdom) Peggy Scriven	6	6
(United Kingdom) Thelma Jarvis	2	4
(United Kingdom) Madge Slaney	3	4
(United Kingdom) Valerie Scott	6	6
(United Kingdom) Mona Riddell	6	3	6
(United Kingdom) Betty Batt	4	6	4
(Netherlands) Madzy Couquerque	6	6
(New Zealand) Marjorie MacFarlane	2	2
(United Kingdom) Mary Whitmarsh	0	1
(United States) Helen Jacobs	6	6
(United Kingdom) Joan Ingram	6	6
(United Kingdom) Ruth Kirk	4	2
(United Kingdom) Evelyn Dearman	2	6
(United Kingdom) Freda James	6	8
(United Kingdom) Dora Beazley	0	2
(Belgium) Josane de Meulemeester	6	6

Second round
8	(United Kingdom) M Scriven	6	6
(United Kingdom) V Scott	3	4
(United Kingdom) M Riddell	3	10	3
(Netherlands) M Couquerque	6	8	6
(United States) H Jacobs	9	6
(United Kingdom) J Ingram	7	3
(United Kingdom) W James	6	6	7
(Belgium) J de Meulemeester	0	8	5

Third round
8	(United Kingdom) M Scriven	6	6
(Netherlands) M Couquerque	2	3
(United States) H Jacobs	6	6
(United Kingdom) W James	4	2

Fourth round
8	(United Kingdom) M Scriven	3	0
(United States) H Jacobs	6	6

=== Bottom half ===
==== Section 5 ====
First round
Q	(United Kingdom) Patience Thomson	3	6	3
(United Kingdom) Jean Saunders	6	4	6
(United Kingdom) Rosemary Thomas	10	7
Q	(United Kingdom) JM Lacy	8	5
(United Kingdom) Pamela Morison	2	2
(United States) Dorothy Bundy	6	6
(Republic of Ireland) Joy Myerscough	2	0
(United Kingdom) Florence Ford	6	6
(United Kingdom) Mary Norman	7	4	2
Q	(United Kingdom) Gladys Southwell	5	6	6
(Italy) Lucia Valerio	3	3
Q	(United Kingdom) Mollie Trouncer	6	6
(United Kingdom) Rita Jarvis	4	6	0
(United Kingdom) Elsa Haylock	6	0	6
(Germany) Gisela Enger	2	3
7	(United States) Sarah Fabyan	6	6

Second round
(United Kingdom) J Saunders	6	6
(United Kingdom) R Thomas	3	3
(United States) D Bundy	6	6
(United Kingdom) F Ford	2	2
Q	(United Kingdom) G Southwell	6	1	7
Q	(United Kingdom) M Trouncer	3	6	5
(United Kingdom) E Haylock	2	4
7	(United States) S Fabyan	6	6

Third round
(United Kingdom) J Saunders	4	2
(United States) D Bundy	6	6
Q	(United Kingdom) G Southwell	1	0
7	(United States) S Fabyan	6	6

Fourth round
(United States) D Bundy	6	3	4
7	(United States) S Fabyan	3	6	6

==== Section 6 ====
First round
(United Kingdom) Margot Lumb	6	6
(South Africa) Olive Craze	0	3
(United Kingdom) Betty Smith	3	2
(United Kingdom) Mary Heeley	6	6
(United Kingdom) Elsie Hamilton	2	7	6
Q	(United Kingdom) Evelyn Curtis	6	5	3
(United Kingdom) Vere Thompson	2	2
(United Kingdom) Sheila Chuter	6	6
(Australia) Thelma Coyne	7	6
(United Kingdom) Billie Yorke	5	1
Q	(United Kingdom) Edith Middleton	2	6	1
(United Kingdom) Gem Hoahing	6	3	6
(United States) Grace Wheeler	6	6
(United Kingdom) Mary Burrows	3	0
(Kingdom of Yugoslavia) Hella Kovač	2	2
4	(Denmark) Hilde Sperling	6	6

Second round
(United Kingdom) M Lumb	7	6
(United Kingdom) M Heeley	5	3
(United Kingdom) E Hamilton	3	4
(United Kingdom) S Chuter	6	6
(Australia) T Coyne	6	6
(United Kingdom) C Hoahing	3	0
(United States) G Wheeler	0	0
4	(Denmark) H Sperling	6	6

Third round
(United Kingdom) M Lumb	6	6
(United Kingdom) S Chuter	2	2
(Australia) T Coyne	4	2
4	(Denmark) H Sperling	6	6

Fourth round
(United Kingdom) M Lumb	5	1
4	(Denmark) H Sperling	7	6

==== Section 7 ====
First round

Second round
(United Kingdom) Betty Nuthall	2	6	6
(United States) Dorothy Andrus	6	4	2
(United Kingdom) Nancy Macpherson-Grant	4	6	6
(United Kingdom) Effie Peters	6	1	2
(United Kingdom) Margot Stewart	6	7
(United Kingdom) Nina Brown	1	5
(United Kingdom) Peggy Michell	3	2
6	(United Kingdom) Kay Stammers	6	6

Third round
(United Kingdom) B Nuthall	6	2	6
(United Kingdom) N Macpherson-Grant	2	6	4
(United Kingdom) M Stewart	4	1
6	(United Kingdom) K Stammers	6	6

Fourth round
(United Kingdom) B Nuthall	3	0
6	(United Kingdom) K Stammers	6	6

==== Section 8 ====
First round

Second round
(Hungary) Magda Baumgarten	8	5
(United Kingdom) Peggy Knight	10	7
(South Africa) Dulcie Kitson	1	2
(South Africa) Bobbie Heine Miller	6	6
(United Kingdom) Nancy Glover	3	6	6
(France) Sylvie Henrotin	6	4	4
(Australia) Nell Hopman	3	4
1	(United States) Helen Moody	6	6

Third round
(United Kingdom) P Knight	0	2
(South Africa) E Heine Miller	6	6
(United Kingdom) N Glover	4	5
1	(United States) H Moody	6	7

Fourth round
(South Africa) E Heine Miller	6	4
1	(United States) H Moody	8	6

Preceded by 1938 French Championships	Grand Slams; Women's Singles	Succeeded by 1938 U.S. National Championships
