= 1938 Wimbledon Championships – Women's doubles =

Tennis tournament

Women's doubles
- 1938 Wimbledon Championships

Final
- Champions: (United States) Sarah Fabyan (United States) Alice Marble
- Runners-up: (France) Simonne Mathieu (United Kingdom) Billie Yorke
- Score: 6–2, 6–3

Details
- Draw: 48 (5 Q )
- Seeds: 4

Events
Singles	men	women		boys	girls
Doubles	men	women	mixed	boys	girls
← 1937 ·	Wimbledon Championships	· 1939 →

Sarah Fabyan and Alice Marble defeated the defending champions Simonne Mathieu and Billie Yorke in the final, 6–2, 6–3 to win the ladies' doubles tennis title at the 1936 Wimbledon Championships.

== Seeds ==
1. (France) Simonne Mathieu / (United Kingdom) Billie Yorke (final)
2. (United States) Sarah Fabyan / (United States) Alice Marble (champions)
3. (United Kingdom) Evelyn Dearman / (United Kingdom) Joan Ingram (third round)
4. (South Africa) Bobbie Heine Miller / (South Africa) Margaret Morphew (semifinals)

Click on the seed number of a player to go to their draw section.

== Draw ==
=== Key ===
- Q = Qualifier
- WC = Wild card
- LL = Lucky loser
- Alt = Alternate
- SE = Special exempt
- PR = Protected ranking
- ITF = ITF entry
- JE = Junior exempt
- w/o = Walkover
- r = Retired
- d = Defaulted
- SR = Special ranking

=== Finals ===
Quarterfinals
2	(United States) Sarah Fabyan (United States) Alice Marble	4	6	6
(Australia) Thelma Coyne (Australia) Nancye Wynne	6	2	2
4	(South Africa) Bobbie Heine Miller (South Africa) Margaret Morphew	6	6
(United Kingdom) Freda James (United Kingdom) Kay Stammers	4	2
(United Kingdom) Jean Saunders (United Kingdom) Valerie Scott	0	2
(United States) Dorothy Andrus (France) Sylvie Henrotin	6	6
(Chile) Anita Lizana (United Kingdom) Peggy Scriven	5	4
1	(France) Simonne Mathieu (United Kingdom) Billie Yorke	7	6

Semifinals
2	(United States) Sarah Fabyan (United States) Alice Marble	7	6
4	(South Africa) Bobbie Heine Miller (South Africa) Margaret Morphew	5	4
(United States) Dorothy Andrus (France) Sylvie Henrotin	6	3	4
1	(France) Simonne Mathieu (United Kingdom) Billie Yorke	3	6	6

Final
2	(United States) Sarah Fabyan (United States) Alice Marble	6	6
1	(France) Simonne Mathieu (United Kingdom) Billie Yorke	2	3

=== Top half ===
==== Section 1 ====
First round

Second round
2	(United States) Sarah Fabyan (United States) Alice Marble	7	6
(Poland) Jadwiga Jędrzejowska (United Kingdom) MA Thomas	5	3
(United Kingdom) Sheila Chuter (United Kingdom) Betty Couper	2	4
(United Kingdom) Phyllis King (United Kingdom) Elsie Pittman	6	6
(United Kingdom) Alex McKelvie (United Kingdom) Susan Noel	6	3	1
(United Kingdom) Helen Burr (United Kingdom) Yvonne Law	0	6	6
(United Kingdom) Nina Brown (United Kingdom) Rita Jarvis	4	6	2
(Australia) Thelma Coyne (Australia) Nancye Wynne	6	3	6

Third round
2	(United States) S Fabyan (United States) A Marble
(United Kingdom) P King (United Kingdom) E Pittman	w/o
(United Kingdom) H Burr (United Kingdom) Y Law	1	6
(Australia) T Coyne (Australia) N Wynne	6	8

Quarterfinals
2	(United States) S Fabyan (United States) A Marble	4	6	6
(Australia) T Coyne (Australia) N Wynne	6	2	2

==== Section 2 ====
First round
4	(South Africa) Bobbie Heine Miller (South Africa) Margaret Morphew	6	6
(United Kingdom) Pamela Morison (United Kingdom) Betty Uber	1	1
Q	(United Kingdom) Dora Beazley (United Kingdom) Barbara Tew	6	0
(United Kingdom) Mrs CP Brutton (United Kingdom) Nancy Macpherson-Grant	8	6
(United Kingdom) Mary Hardwick (United Kingdom) Mary Whitmarsh	6	6
(United Kingdom) Patsy O'Connell (United Kingdom) Effie Peters	3	0
(United Kingdom) Cecily Marriott (United Kingdom) Madge Slaney	6	1	3
(United Kingdom) Betty Batt (United Kingdom) Patience Thomson	4	6	6
(United Kingdom) Gaby Curtis (United Kingdom) Andree Lucas	5	4
(United Kingdom) Ermyntrude Harvey (United Kingdom) Mary Heeley	7	6
(United Kingdom) Nancy Glover (United Kingdom) Betty Nuthall	9	1
(United Kingdom) Doris Howard (Belgium) Josane de Meulemeester	11	6
Q	(United Kingdom) Bernice Lumb (United Kingdom) Margot Lumb	3	4
(United Kingdom) Freda James (United Kingdom) Kay Stammers	6	6
(United Kingdom) Denise Huntbach (United Kingdom) Margot Stewart	3	9	6
(United Kingdom) Elsa Haylock (United Kingdom) Ruth Kirk	6	7	3

Second round
4	(South Africa) E Heine Miller (South Africa) M Morphew	6	7
(United Kingdom) Mrs CP Brutton (United Kingdom) N Macpherson-Grant	3	5
(United Kingdom) M Hardwick (United Kingdom) M Whitmarsh	6	6
(United Kingdom) E Batt (United Kingdom) P Thomson	4	4
(United Kingdom) E Harvey (United Kingdom) M Heeley	6	1	6
(United Kingdom) D Howard (Belgium) J de Meulemeester	1	6	8
(United Kingdom) W James (United Kingdom) K Stammers	6	8
(United Kingdom) D Huntbach (United Kingdom) M Stewart	3	6

Third round
4	(South Africa) E Heine Miller (South Africa) M Morphew	6	6
(United Kingdom) M Hardwick (United Kingdom) M Whitmarsh	4	4
(United Kingdom) D Howard (Belgium) J de Meulemeester	3	4
(United Kingdom) W James (United Kingdom) K Stammers	6	6

Quarterfinals
4	(South Africa) E Heine Miller (South Africa) M Morphew	6	6
(United Kingdom) W James (United Kingdom) K Stammers	4	2

=== Bottom half ===
==== Section 3 ====
First round
(United Kingdom) Peggy Michell (United Kingdom) Dorothy Shepherd-Barron	6	6
(Denmark) Else Hollis (United Kingdom) Mrs W Merricks	4	4
(South Africa) Olive Craze (South Africa) Sheila Piercey	6	6
(United Kingdom) Joan Marquis (United Kingdom) Mona Riddell	1	1
(United States) Dorothy Bundy (United States) Helen Jacobs	7	6
(United Kingdom) Betty Hobson (United Kingdom) Thelma Jarvis	5	2
(United Kingdom) Jean Saunders (United Kingdom) Valerie Scott	6	6
Q	(United Kingdom) Muriel Bray (United Kingdom) Audrey Cardinall	4	4
(Australia) Joan Hartigan (Australia) Margaret Wilson	10	0	6
(United States) Dorothy Andrus (France) Sylvie Henrotin	8	6	8
(United Kingdom) Mary Burrows (United Kingdom) Rosemary Smith	6	6
(United States) Dorothy Wightman (United States) Hazel Wightman	4	1
(Hungary) Magda Baumgarten (Kingdom of Yugoslavia) Hella Kovač	4	1
(Germany) Gisela Enger (Austria) Rosl Kraus	6	6
(Canada) Jean Milne (Hungary) Margit Paksy	3	1
3	(United Kingdom) Evelyn Dearman (United Kingdom) Joan Ingram	6	6

Second round
(United Kingdom) M Michell (United Kingdom) D Shepherd-Barron	4	5
(South Africa) O Craze (South Africa) S Piercey	6	7
(United States) D Bundy (United States) H Jacobs	2	6
(United Kingdom) J Saunders (United Kingdom) V Scott	6	8
(United States) D Andrus (France) S Henrotin	5	6	6
(United Kingdom) M Burrows (United Kingdom) R Smith	7	4	2
(Germany) G Enger (Austria) R Kraus	3	1
3	(United Kingdom) E Dearman (United Kingdom) J Ingram	6	6

Third round
(South Africa) O Craze (South Africa) S Piercey	1	1
(United Kingdom) J Saunders (United Kingdom) V Scott	6	6
(United States) D Andrus (France) S Henrotin	3	6	9
3	(United Kingdom) E Dearman (United Kingdom) J Ingram	6	1	7

Quarterfinals
(United Kingdom) J Saunders (United Kingdom) V Scott	0	2
(United States) D Andrus (France) S Henrotin	6	6

==== Section 4 ====
First round

Second round
(United Kingdom) Penny Durlac (United Kingdom) Joan Strawson	6	3	2
(Republic of Ireland) Joy Myerscough (United Kingdom) Freda Underwood	2	6	6
Q	M MacTier (United Kingdom) Margaret Mellows	2	4
(Chile) Anita Lizana (United Kingdom) Peggy Scriven	6	6
Q	(United Kingdom) C Douglas (United Kingdom) BM Turner	6	5
(Australia) Nell Hopman (Australia) Dorothy Stevenson	8	7
(Netherlands) Madzy Couquerque (United States) Grace Wheeler	3	3
1	(France) Simonne Mathieu (United Kingdom) Billie Yorke	6	6

Third round
(Republic of Ireland) J Myerscough (United Kingdom) F Underwood	6	0	1
(Chile) A Lizana (United Kingdom) M Scriven	1	6	6
(Australia) E Hopman (Australia) D Stevenson	4	4
1	(France) S Mathieu (United Kingdom) A Yorke	6	6

Quarterfinals
(Chile) A Lizana (United Kingdom) M Scriven	5	4
1	(France) S Mathieu (United Kingdom) A Yorke	7	6

The nationality of Miss M MacTier is unknown.
