= 1937 Wimbledon Championships – Women's singles =

Women's singles
- 1937 Wimbledon Championships

Final
- Champion: (United Kingdom) Dorothy Round
- Runner-up: (Poland) Jadwiga Jędrzejowska
- Score: 6–2, 2–6, 7-5

Details
- Draw: 97 (10Q)
- Seeds: 8

Events
Singles	men	women		boys	girls
Doubles	men	women	mixed	boys	girls
- Wimbledon Championships

Dorothy Round defeated Jadwiga Jędrzejowska in the final, 6–2, 2–6, 7–5 to win the ladies' singles tennis title at the 1937 Wimbledon Championships. Helen Jacobs was the defending champion, but lost in the quarterfinals to Round.

== Seeds ==
1. (United States) Helen Jacobs (quarterfinals)
2. (Denmark) Hilde Sperling (quarterfinals)
3. (Chile) Anita Lizana (quarterfinals)
4. (Poland) Jadwiga Jędrzejowska (final)
5. (United States) Alice Marble (semifinals)
6. (France) Simonne Mathieu (semifinals)
7. (United Kingdom) Dorothy Round (champion)
8. (United Kingdom) Kay Stammers (fourth round)

Click on the seed number of a player to go to their draw section.

== Draw ==
Key

- Q = Qualifier
- WC = Wild card
- LL = Lucky loser
- Alt = Alternate
- ITF = ITF entry
- PR = Protected ranking
- SR = Special ranking
- SE = Special exempt
- JE = Junior exempt
- JR = Junior Accelerator Programme entrant
- CO = College Accelerator Programme entrant
- NG = Next Gen Accelerator Program entrant
- w/o = Walkover
- r = Retired
- d = Defaulted

=== Finals ===
Quarterfinals
2	(Denmark) Hilde Sperling	5	6	3
5	(United States) Alice Marble	7	2	6
4	(Poland) Jadwiga Jędrzejowska	6	6
(United Kingdom) Peggy Scriven	1	2
6	(France) Simonne Mathieu	6	6
3	(Chile) Anita Lizana	3	3
7	(United Kingdom) Dorothy Round	6	6
1	(United States) Helen Jacobs	4	2

Semifinals
5	(United States) Alice Marble	6	2
4	(Poland) Jadwiga Jędrzejowska	8	6
6	(France) Simonne Mathieu	4	0
7	(United Kingdom) Dorothy Round	6	6

Final
4	(Poland) Jadwiga Jędrzejowska	2	6	5
7	(United Kingdom) Dorothy Round	6	2	7

=== Top half ===
==== Section 1 ====
First round

Second round
2	(Denmark) Hilde Sperling	6	6
(Hungary) Magda Baumgarten	2	0
(Germany) Marie Horn	6	7	7
(United Kingdom) Mary Burrows	1	9	5
(United Kingdom) Edie Luxton	6	5	3
(United Kingdom) Denise Huntbach	3	7	6
(United Kingdom) Gertrude Valentine-Brown	3	3
(United Kingdom) Gaby Curtis	6	6

Third round
2	(Denmark) H Sperling	6	6
(Germany) M Horn	2	0
(United Kingdom) D Huntbach	4	6
(United Kingdom) G Curtis	6	8

Fourth round
2	(Denmark) H Sperling	6	6
(United Kingdom) G Curtis	4	4

==== Section 2 ====
First round
(United Kingdom) Elsa Haylock	6	6	6
(United Kingdom) Sheila Chuter	8	2	3

Second round
5	(United States) Alice Marble	9	6	6
(United Kingdom) Mary Hardwick	11	4	3
(United Kingdom) Molly Lincoln	6	6
(Austria) Rosl Kraus	4	3
(France) Sylvie Henrotin	1	1
(Netherlands) Madzy Couquerque	6	6
Q	(United Kingdom) Edith Middleton	2	1
(United Kingdom) E Haylock	6	6

Third round
5	(United States) A Marble	6	6
(United Kingdom) M Lincoln	1	0
(Netherlands) M Couquerque	6	6
(United Kingdom) E Haylock	4	4

Fourth round
5	(United States) A Marble	6	6
(Netherlands) M Couquerque	0	2

==== Section 3 ====
First round
4	(Poland) Jadwiga Jędrzejowska	6	6
(United Kingdom) Susan Noel	2	0
(United Kingdom) Betty Couper	3	5
(United Kingdom) Dora Beazley	6	7
(United Kingdom) Gladys Southwell	3	6	6
(United Kingdom) Mary Whitmarsh	6	3	1
(United Kingdom) Mie Trentham	4	10	6
Q	(Sweden) Alva Samuelsson	6	8	3
(United Kingdom) Madie Moss	1	1
(United Kingdom) Florence Ford	6	6
(United Kingdom) Winifred Bower	5	2
(United Kingdom) Joan Goss	7	6
(United Kingdom) Billie Yorke	6	6
(United Kingdom) Thelma Jarvis	2	3
(United Kingdom) Nancy Dickin	4	3
(United States) Dorothy Andrus	6	6

Second round
4	(Poland) J Jędrzejowska	6	6
(United Kingdom) D Beazley	1	1
(United Kingdom) G Southwell	6	6
(United Kingdom) M Trentham	2	2
(United Kingdom) F Ford	6	6
(United Kingdom) J Goss	4	4
(United Kingdom) A Yorke	3	4
(United States) D Andrus	6	6

Third round
4	(Poland) J Jędrzejowska	6	6
(United Kingdom) G Southwell	1	1
(United Kingdom) F Ford	4	1
(United States) D Andrus	6	6

Fourth round
4	(Poland) J Jędrzejowska	6	6
(United States) D Andrus	0	2

==== Section 4 ====
First round
8	(United Kingdom) Kay Stammers	6	6
(United Kingdom) Nancy Lyle	2	2
Q	(United Kingdom) Betty Uber	4	6	6
Q	(United Kingdom) Mary Norman	6	4	4
(United States) Katherine Winthrop	7	6
(United Kingdom) Betty Hobson	5	4
Q	(United Kingdom) Gem Hoahing	6	4
(United Kingdom) Patsy O'Connell	8	6
(United Kingdom) Joan Ingram	1	1
(United Kingdom) Effie Peters	6	6
(United Kingdom) Freda Underwood	5	4
(United Kingdom) Joan Strawson	7	6
(Republic of Ireland) Josephine Harman	0	2
(United Kingdom) Peggy Scriven	6	6
(United Kingdom) Sheila Paterson	2	2
(United Kingdom) Valerie Scott	6	6

Second round
8	(United Kingdom) K Stammers	9	6
Q	(United Kingdom) E Uber	7	2
(United States) K Winthrop	4	8	6
(United Kingdom) P O'Connell	6	6	1
(United Kingdom) E Peters	6	4	6
(United Kingdom) J Strawson	4	6	2
(United Kingdom) M Scriven	6	6
(United Kingdom) V Scott	2	2

Third round
8	(United Kingdom) K Stammers	6	6
(United States) K Winthrop	3	3
(United Kingdom) E Peters	2	1
(United Kingdom) M Scriven	6	6

Fourth round
8	(United Kingdom) K Stammers	5	3
(United Kingdom) M Scriven	7	6

=== Bottom half ===
==== Section 5 ====
First round
Q	(United Kingdom) Olga Haycraft	2	4
(United Kingdom) Mrs J Selwyn James	6	6
(United Kingdom) Vere King	3	3
(United Kingdom) Elsie Pittman	6	6
(United Kingdom) Betty Batt	0	1
(United Kingdom) Phyllis King	6	6
(United Kingdom) Mary Bowden	6	6
(United Kingdom) Peggy Pleydell-Bouverie	4	3
(United Kingdom) Olga MacInnes	6	2	6
(United Kingdom) Joan Marquis	3	6	4
(United Kingdom) Evelyn Dearman	6	6
Q	(United Kingdom) Phyllis Grover	2	2
LL	(United Kingdom) Audrey Cardinall	3	3
(Kingdom of Yugoslavia) Hella Kovač	6	6
(France) Colette Boegner	1	0
6	(France) Simonne Mathieu	6	6

Second round
(United Kingdom) Mrs J Selwyn James	5	4
(United Kingdom) E Pittman	7	6
(United Kingdom) P King	6	6
(United Kingdom) M Bowden	0	0
(United Kingdom) O MacInnes	3	5
(United Kingdom) E Dearman	6	7
(Kingdom of Yugoslavia) H Kovač	2	3
6	(France) S Mathieu	6	6

Third round
(United Kingdom) E Pittman	1	4
(United Kingdom) P King	6	6
(United Kingdom) E Dearman	0	3
6	(France) S Mathieu	6	6

Fourth round
(United Kingdom) P King	6	2	0
6	(France) S Mathieu	1	6	6

==== Section 6 ====
First round
(United Kingdom) Madge Slaney	4	3
(United Kingdom) Pamela Morison	6	6
(United Kingdom) Yvonne Law	6	6
Q	(United Kingdom) Margaret Lewis	3	3
(United Kingdom) Patience Thomson	6	7
Q	(United Kingdom) Katherine Keith-Steele	2	5
(United Kingdom) Betty Nuthall	6	6	6
(United Kingdom) Mollie Trouncer	8	0	2
(United Kingdom) Jean Saunders	6	6
(United Kingdom) Margot Stewart	1	4
(United Kingdom) Mona Riddell	6	6
Q	(United Kingdom) Catherine Fenwick	2	3
(United Kingdom) Margot Lumb	6	4	6
(United Kingdom) Nina Brown	4	6	3
(United Kingdom) Gladys Osborne	2	2
3	(Chile) Anita Lizana	6	6

Second round
(United Kingdom) P Morison	2	1
(United Kingdom) Y Law	6	6
(United Kingdom) P Thomson	1	2
(United Kingdom) B Nuthall	6	6
(United Kingdom) J Saunders	8	6
(United Kingdom) M Riddell	6	4
(United Kingdom) M Lumb	6	1	2
3	(Chile) A Lizana	1	6	6

Third round
(United Kingdom) Y Law	6	4	2
(United Kingdom) B Nuthall	2	6	6
(United Kingdom) J Saunders	4	1
3	(Chile) A Lizana	6	6

Fourth round
(United Kingdom) B Nuthall	3	2
3	(Chile) A Lizana	6	6

==== Section 7 ====
First round

Second round
(Republic of Ireland) Joy Myerscough	1	2
(United Kingdom) Alex McOstrich	6	6
(France) Lilí de la Valdène	6	6
(United Kingdom) Freda James	4	0
(Netherlands) Truid Terwindt	2	7	6
(Denmark) Else Hollis	6	5	4
(United Kingdom) Christabel Wheatcroft	1	1
7	(United Kingdom) Dorothy Round	6	6

Third round
(United Kingdom) A McOstrich	4	2
(France) E de la Valdène	6	6
(Netherlands) G Terwindt	2	0
7	(United Kingdom) D Round	6	6

Fourth round
(France) E de la Valdène	1	0
7	(United Kingdom) D Round	6	6

==== Section 8 ====
First round

Second round
(United Kingdom) Rita Jarvis	7	2
(United Kingdom) Rosemary Smith	9	6
(United Kingdom) Audrey Wright	7	6
(Greece) Phyllis Xydis	5	1
(United Kingdom) Mary Heeley	6	6
(United Kingdom) Ruth Kirk	2	1
(United Kingdom) Ermyntrude Harvey	2	1
1	(United States) Helen Jacobs	6	6

Third round
(United Kingdom) R Smith	4	6	5
(United Kingdom) A Wright	6	3	7
(United Kingdom) M Heeley	3	1
1	(United States) H Jacobs	6	6

Fourth round
(United Kingdom) A Wright	0	3
1	(United States) H Jacobs	6	6

Preceded by 1937 French Championships	Grand Slams; Women's Singles	Succeeded by 1937 U.S. National Championships
