= 1937 Wimbledon Championships =

1937 International Tennis Championships

- Date: 21 June – 3 July
- Edition: 57th
- Category: Grand Slam
- Surface: Grass
- Location: Church Road; SW19, Wimbledon, London, United Kingdom
- Venue: All England Lawn Tennis and Croquet Club

Champions

Men's singles
- (United States) Don Budge

Women's singles
- (United Kingdom) Dorothy Round

Men's doubles
- (United States) Don Budge / (United States) Gene Mako

Women's doubles
- (France) Simonne Mathieu / (United Kingdom) Billie Yorke

Mixed doubles
- (United States) Don Budge / (United States) Alice Marble
← 1936 ·	Wimbledon Championships	· 1938 →

The 1937 Wimbledon Championships took place on the outdoor grass courts at the All England Lawn Tennis and Croquet Club in Wimbledon, London, United Kingdom. The tournament was held from Monday 21 June until Saturday 3 July 1937. It was the 57th staging of the Wimbledon Championships, and the third Grand Slam tennis event of 1937. Don Budge and Dorothy Round won the singles title.

This was the first Wimbledon tournament during the reign of King George VI.

== Television ==
This edition marked the first time that the Wimbledon Championships were televised by the BBC. Only matches taking place on Centre Court were transmitted by the BBC for half an hour each day. Two cameras were used, one for a close up view of the match and one for a general view, and the match between Bunny Austin and George Lyttleton-Rogers was the first one to be broadcast.

== Finals ==
=== Men's singles ===
(United States) Don Budge defeated (Germany) Gottfried von Cramm, 6–3, 6–4, 6–2

=== Women's singles ===
(United Kingdom) Dorothy Round defeated (Poland) Jadwiga Jędrzejowska, 6–2, 2–6, 7–5

=== Men's doubles ===
(United States) Don Budge / (United States) Gene Mako defeated (United Kingdom) Pat Hughes / (United Kingdom) Raymond Tuckey, 6–0, 6–4, 6–8, 6-1

=== Women's doubles ===
(France) Simonne Mathieu / (United Kingdom) Billie Yorke defeated (United Kingdom) Phyllis King / (United Kingdom) Elsie Pittman, 6–3, 6–3

=== Mixed doubles ===
(United States) Don Budge / (United States) Alice Marble defeated (France) Yvon Petra / (France) Simonne Mathieu, 6–4, 6–1

Preceded by 1937 French Championships	Grand Slams	Succeeded by 1937 U.S. National Championships
