= 1939 Wimbledon Championships – Women's doubles =

Women's doubles
- 1939 Wimbledon Championships

Final
- Champions: (United States) Sarah Fabyan (United States) Alice Marble
- Runners-up: (United States) Helen Jacobs (United Kingdom) Billie Yorke
- Score: 6–1, 6–0

Details
- Draw: 48 (5 Q )
- Seeds: 4

Events
Singles	men	women		boys	girls
Doubles	men	women	mixed	boys	girls
← 1938 ·	Wimbledon Championships	· 1946 →

Sarah Fabyan and Alice Marble successfully defended their title, defeating Helen Jacobs and Billie Yorke in the final, 6–1, 6–0 to win the Ladies' Doubles.

== Seeds ==
1. (United States) Sarah Fabyan / (United States) Alice Marble (champions)
2. (United States) Helen Jacobs / (United Kingdom) Billie Yorke (final)
3. (Poland) Jadwiga Jędrzejowska / (France) Simonne Mathieu (first round)
4. (United Kingdom) Jean Nicoll / (United Kingdom) Betty Nuthall (semifinals)

Click on the seed number of a player to go to their draw section.

== Draw ==
=== Key ===
- Q = Qualifier
- WC = Wild card
- LL = Lucky loser
- Alt = Alternate
- SE = Special exempt
- PR = Protected ranking
- ITF = ITF entry
- JE = Junior exempt
- w/o = Walkover
- r = Retired
- d = Defaulted
- SR = Special ranking

=== Finals ===
Quarterfinals
1	(United States) Sarah Fabyan (United States) Alice Marble	4	6	6
(Hungary) Klára Somogyi (United States) Grace Wheeler	6	0	0
(United Kingdom) Freda Hammersley (United Kingdom) Kay Stammers	6	4	6
(United Kingdom) Ermyntrude Harvey (United Kingdom) Phyllis King	1	6	2
(United Kingdom) Nina Brown (United Kingdom) Rita Jarvis	2	2
4	(United Kingdom) Jean Nicoll (United Kingdom) Betty Nuthall	6	6
(United Kingdom) Bernice Lumb (United Kingdom) Margot Lumb	0	1
2	(United States) Helen Jacobs (United Kingdom) Billie Yorke	6	6

Semifinals
1	(United States) Sarah Fabyan (United States) Alice Marble	8	6
(United Kingdom) Freda Hammersley (United Kingdom) Kay Stammers	6	3
4	(United Kingdom) Jean Nicoll (United Kingdom) Betty Nuthall	7	4	9
2	(United States) Helen Jacobs (United Kingdom) Billie Yorke	5	6	11

Final
1	(United States) Sarah Fabyan (United States) Alice Marble	6	6
2	(United States) Helen Jacobs (United Kingdom) Billie Yorke	1	0

=== Top half ===
==== Section 1 ====
First round

Second round
1	(United States) Sarah Fabyan (United States) Alice Marble	6	6
(United Kingdom) Helen Burr (United Kingdom) Yvonne Law	1	1
(United Kingdom) Cecily Marriott (United Kingdom) Madge Slaney	4	2
(United Kingdom) Susan Noel (United Kingdom) Patsy O'Connell	6	6
(United Kingdom) Joan Marquis (United Kingdom) Mona Riddell	4	8
(United Kingdom) Peggy Knight (United Kingdom) Enid Sutton	6	10
(Hungary) Klára Somogyi (United States) Grace Wheeler	6	7
(United Kingdom) Gladys Brutton (United Kingdom) Nancy Macpherson-Grant	4	5

Third round
1	(United States) S Fabyan (United States) A Marble	6	6
(United Kingdom) S Noel (United Kingdom) P O'Connell	3	2
(United Kingdom) P Knight (United Kingdom) E Sutton	3	6	5
(Hungary) K Somogyi (United States) G Wheeler	6	3	7

Quarterfinals
1	(United States) S Fabyan (United States) A Marble	4	6	6
(Hungary) K Somogyi (United States) G Wheeler	6	0	0

==== Section 2 ====
First round
3	(Poland) Jadwiga Jędrzejowska (France) Simonne Mathieu	3	1
(United Kingdom) Freda Hammersley (United Kingdom) Kay Stammers	6	6
(United Kingdom) Audrey Roberts (United Kingdom) Freda Underwood	6	9
(United Kingdom) Nancy Glover (United Kingdom) Elsie Pittman	2	7
(Italy) Wally San Donnino (Italy) Vittoria Tonolli	6	3	6
(United Kingdom) Penny Durlac (United Kingdom) Joan Strawson	2	6	2
Q	(United Kingdom) Sheila Kenyon (United Kingdom) Sally Stoney	6	3	6
(Norway) Laila Schou Nilsen (United Kingdom) Patience Thomson	2	6	0
(United States) Dorothy Andrus (France) Sylvie Henrotin	5	2
(United Kingdom) Mary Cartwright (United Kingdom) Dorothy Little	7	6
Q	(United Kingdom) Zoe Morse (United Kingdom) Margot Parker	4	6	3
(United Kingdom) Elsa Haylock (United Kingdom) Ruth Kirk	6	3	6
(United Kingdom) Ermyntrude Harvey (United Kingdom) Phyllis King	6	6
Q	(Republic of Ireland) Pamela Goodwyn (Republic of Ireland) Joy Myerscough	2	2
(United Kingdom) Mary Norman (United Kingdom) Betty Smith	4	6	1
(United Kingdom) Betty Cooke (United Kingdom) Margot Stewart	6	1	6

Second round
(United Kingdom) W Hammersley (United Kingdom) K Stammers	6	6
(United Kingdom) A Roberts (United Kingdom) F Underwood	0	1
(Italy) W San Donnino (Italy) V Tonolli	6	4	6
Q	(United Kingdom) S Kenyon (United Kingdom) S Stoney	2	6	2
(United Kingdom) M Cartwright (United Kingdom) D Little	6	2	6
(United Kingdom) E Haylock (United Kingdom) R Kirk	2	6	0
(United Kingdom) E Harvey (United Kingdom) P King	6	6
(United Kingdom) B Cooke (United Kingdom) M Stewart	2	0

Third round
(United Kingdom) W Hammersley (United Kingdom) K Stammers	6	6
(Italy) W San Donnino (Italy) V Tonolli	2	2
(United Kingdom) M Cartwright (United Kingdom) D Little	5	9
(United Kingdom) E Harvey (United Kingdom) P King	7	11

Quarterfinals
(United Kingdom) W Hammersley (United Kingdom) K Stammers	6	4	6
(United Kingdom) E Harvey (United Kingdom) P King	1	6	2

=== Bottom half ===
==== Section 3 ====
First round
Q	M Law (Belgium) Beatrice Watson	2	1
(United Kingdom) Doris Howard (Belgium) Josane de Meulemeester	6	6
(United Kingdom) Mary Hardwick (United Kingdom) Peggy Scriven	6	4	8
(United Kingdom) Evelyn Dearman (United Kingdom) Joan Ingram	4	6	6
(Australia) Thora Geddes (Germany) Anneliese Ullstein	2	2
(United Kingdom) Nina Brown (United Kingdom) Rita Jarvis	6	6
(United Kingdom) Mary Sargeant (United Kingdom) Rosemary Smith	6	6
(United Kingdom) Thelma Jarvis (United Kingdom) Gladys Southwell	2	2
(Romania) Magda Berescu (Greece) Phyllis Xydis	3	2
Q	(United Kingdom) Alex McKelvie (United Kingdom) Audrey Wenyon	6	6
(United Kingdom) Betty Batt (United Kingdom) Audrey Cardinall	6	6
(Germany) Thilde Dietz (Germany) Inge Schumann	1	1
(Kingdom of Yugoslavia) Alicia Florian (Kingdom of Yugoslavia) Hella Kovač	7	2
(United Kingdom) Pamela Morison (United Kingdom) Betty Uber	9	6
(United Kingdom) Muriel Harris (United Kingdom) Mary Whitmarsh	4	3
4	(United Kingdom) Jean Nicoll (United Kingdom) Betty Nuthall	6	6

Second round
(United Kingdom) D Howard (Belgium) J de Meulemeester	5	4
(United Kingdom) M Hardwick (United Kingdom) M Scriven	7	6
(United Kingdom) N Brown (United Kingdom) R Jarvis	4	6	6
(United Kingdom) M Sargeant (United Kingdom) R Smith	6	4	1
Q	(United Kingdom) A McKelvie (United Kingdom) A Wenyon	2	4
(United Kingdom) E Batt (United Kingdom) A Cardinall	6	6
(United Kingdom) P Morison (United Kingdom) E Uber	6	0
4	(United Kingdom) J Nicoll (United Kingdom) B Nuthall	8	6

Third round
(United Kingdom) M Hardwick (United Kingdom) M Scriven	3	6	6
(United Kingdom) N Brown (United Kingdom) R Jarvis	6	3	8
(United Kingdom) E Batt (United Kingdom) A Cardinall	1	3
4	(United Kingdom) J Nicoll (United Kingdom) B Nuthall	6	6

Quarterfinals
(United Kingdom) N Brown (United Kingdom) R Jarvis	2	2
4	(United Kingdom) J Nicoll (United Kingdom) B Nuthall	6	6

The nationality of Miss M Law is unknown.

==== Section 4 ====
First round

Second round
(United Kingdom) Bernice Lumb (United Kingdom) Margot Lumb	6	1	6
(United Kingdom) Jean Saunders (United Kingdom) Valerie Scott	2	6	4
(United Kingdom) Betty Clements (United Kingdom) Diana Wood	3	6	3
(France) Cosette St. Omer Roy (Luxembourg) Alice Weiwers	6	3	6
(United Kingdom) Rosemary Thomas (United Kingdom) Mollie Trouncer	6	3
(Netherlands) Madzy Couquerque (France) Suzanne Pannetier	8	6
(United Kingdom) Peggy Pleydell Bouverie (United Kingdom) Dorothy Shepherd-Barron	2	3
2	(United States) Helen Jacobs (United Kingdom) Billie Yorke	6	6

Third round
(United Kingdom) B Lumb (United Kingdom) M Lumb	7	6
(France) C St. Omer Roy (Luxembourg) A Weiwers	5	3
(Netherlands) M Couquerque (France) S Pannetier	1	6	4
2	(United States) H Jacobs (United Kingdom) A Yorke	6	4	6

Quarterfinals
(United Kingdom) B Lumb (United Kingdom) M Lumb	0	1
2	(United States) H Jacobs (United Kingdom) A Yorke	6	6
