= 1939 Wimbledon Championships =

- Date: 26 June – 8 July
- Edition: 59th
- Category: Grand Slam
- Surface: Grass
- Location: Church Road; SW19, Wimbledon, London, United Kingdom
- Venue: All England Lawn Tennis and Croquet Club

Champions

Men's singles
- (United States) Bobby Riggs

Women's singles
- (United States) Alice Marble

Men's doubles
- (United States) Elwood Cooke / (United States) Bobby Riggs

Women's doubles
- (United States) Sarah Fabyan / (United States) Alice Marble

Mixed doubles
- (United States) Bobby Riggs / (United States) Alice Marble
| ← 1938 · | Wimbledon Championships | · 1946 → |

The 1939 Wimbledon Championships took place on the outdoor grass courts at the All England Lawn Tennis and Croquet Club in Wimbledon, London, United Kingdom. The tournament was held from Monday 26 June until Saturday 8 July 1939. It was the 59th staging of the Wimbledon Championships, and the third Grand Slam tennis event of 1939. Bobby Riggs and Alice Marble won the singles titles. This was the last edition of the Wimbledon Championships before the outbreak of World War II. The event would not be held again until 1946.

== Finals ==
=== Men's singles ===
(United States) Bobby Riggs defeated (United States) Elwood Cooke, 2–6, 8–6, 3–6, 6–3, 6–2

=== Women's singles ===
(United States) Alice Marble defeated (United Kingdom) Kay Stammers, 6–2, 6–0

=== Men's doubles ===
(United States) Elwood Cooke / (United States) Bobby Riggs defeated (United Kingdom) Charles Hare / (United Kingdom) Frank Wilde, 6–3, 3–6, 6–3, 9–7

=== Women's doubles ===
(United States) Sarah Fabyan / (United States) Alice Marble defeated (United States) Helen Jacobs / (United Kingdom) Billie Yorke, 6–1, 6–0

=== Mixed doubles ===
(United States) Bobby Riggs / (United States) Alice Marble defeated (United Kingdom) Frank Wilde / (United Kingdom) Nina Brown, 9–7, 6–1

| Preceded by 1939 French Championships | Grand Slams | Succeeded by 1939 U.S. National Championships |
| Preceded by 1938 Wimbledon Championships | The Championships, Wimbledon | Succeeded by 1946 Wimbledon Championships; 1940 to 1945 editions cancelled |
