= 1937 U.S. National Championships – Women's singles =

Women's singles
- 1937 U.S. National Championships

Final
- Champion: (Chile) Anita Lizana
- Runner-up: (Poland) Jadwiga Jędrzejowska
- Score: 6–4, 6–2

Details
- Draw: 64
- Seeds: 8

Events
Singles	men	women
Doubles	men	women
← 1936 ·	U.S. National Championships	· 1938 →

Anita Lizana defeated Jadwiga Jędrzejowska 6–4, 6–2 in the final to win the women's singles tennis title at the 1937 U.S. National Championships. The tournament was played on outdoor grass courts and held from September 2, through September 11, 1937 at the West Side Tennis Club in Forest Hills, Queens, New York. Lizana won the tournament without losing a set.

The draw consisted of 64 players of which eight were seeded.

== Seeds ==
The eight seeded U.S. players are listed below. Anita Lizana is the champion; others show in brackets the round in which they were eliminated.

1. (United States) Alice Marble (quarterfinals)
2. (United States) Helen Jacobs (semifinals)
3. (United States) Sarah Fabyan (first round)
4. (United States) Marjorie Van Ryn (quarterfinals)
5. (United States) Gracyn Wheeler (third round)
6. (United States) Dorothy Bundy (semifinals)
7. (United States) Carolin Babcock (third round)
8. (United States) Helen Pedersen (first round)

== Draw ==
=== Final eight ===
Quarterfinals
2	(United States) Helen Jacobs	7	6
(United Kingdom) Kay Stammers	5	3
3	(United Kingdom) Mary Hardwick	4	2
(Poland) Jadwiga Jędrzejowska	6	6
1	(United States) Alice Marble	6	5	1
6	(United States) Dorothy Bundy	1	7	6
4	(United States) Marjorie Van Ryn	1	1
(Chile) Anita Lizana	6	6

Semifinals
2	(United States) Helen Jacobs	4	4
(Poland) Jadwiga Jędrzejowska	6	6
6	(United States) Dorothy Bundy	2	3
(Chile) Anita Lizana	6	6

Finals
(Poland) Jadwiga Jędrzejowska	4	2
(Chile) Anita Lizana	6	6

Preceded by 1937 Wimbledon Championships – Women's singles	Grand Slam women's singles	Succeeded by 1938 Australian Championships – Women's singles
