= 1939 U.S. National Championships – Women's singles =

Women's singles
- 1939 U.S. National Championships

Final
- Champion: (United States) Alice Marble
- Runner-up: (United States) Helen Jacobs
- Score: 6–0, 8–10, 6–4

Details
- Draw: 64
- Seeds: 8

Events
Singles	men	women
Doubles	men	women
← 1938 ·	U.S. National Championships	· 1940 →

First-seeded Alice Marble defeated second-seeded Helen Jacobs 6–0, 8–10, 6–4 in the final to win the women's singles tennis title at the 1939 U.S. National Championships. The tournament was played on outdoor grass courts and held from September 7, through September 17, 1939 at the West Side Tennis Club in Forest Hills, Queens, New York.

The draw consisted of 64 players of which eight were seeded.

== Seeds ==
The eight seeded U.S. players are listed below. Alice Marble is the champion; others show in brackets the round in which they were eliminated.

1. (United States) Alice Marble (champion)
2. (United States) Helen Jacobs (finalist)
3. (United States) Sarah Fabyan (quarterfinals)
4. (United States) Dorothy Bundy (quarterfinals)
5. (United States) Gracyn Wheeler (first round)
6. (United States) Helen Bernhard (third round)
7. (United States) Dorothy Workman (third round)
8. (United States) Virginia Wolfenden (semifinals)

== Draw ==
=== Final eight ===
Quarterfinals
2	(United States) Helen Jacobs	2	6	6
(United Kingdom) Valerie Scott	6	2	3
3	(United States) Sarah Fabyan	6	3	3
(United Kingdom) Kay Stammers	1	6	6
1	(United States) Alice Marble	6	6	6
(United Kingdom) Mary Hardwick	3	8	2
4	(United States) Dorothy Bundy	6	1	2
8	(United States) Virginia Wolfenden	2	6	6

Semifinals
2	(United States) Helen Jacobs	7	6
(United Kingdom) Kay Stammers	5	0
1	(United States) Alice Marble	6	6
8	(United States) Virginia Wolfenden	0	1

Finals
2	(United States) Helen Jacobs	0	10	4
1	(United States) Alice Marble	6	8	6

Preceded by 1939 Wimbledon Championships – Women's singles	Grand Slam women's singles	Succeeded by 1940 Australian Championships – Women's singles
