= 1937 U.S. National Championships (tennis) =

- Date: September 2 – 11
- Edition: 57th
- Category: Grand Slam (ITF)
- Surface: Grass
- Location: Forest Hills, Queens; New York City, New York
- Venue: West Side Tennis Club

Champions

Men's singles
- (United States) Don Budge

Women's singles
- (Chile) Anita Lizana

Men's doubles
- (Germany) Gottfried von Cramm / (Germany) Henner Henkel

Women's doubles
- (United States) Sarah Palfrey Cooke / (United States) Alice Marble

Mixed doubles
- (United States) Sarah Palfrey Cooke / (United States) Don Budge
| ← 1936 · | U.S. National Championships | · 1938 → |

The 1937 U.S. National Championships (now known as the US Open) was a tennis tournament that took place on the outdoor grass courts at the West Side Tennis Club, Forest Hills in New York City, New York. The tournament ran from September 2 until September 11. It was the 57th staging of the U.S. National Championships and the fourth Grand Slam tennis event of the year.

== Finals ==
=== Men's singles ===
(United States) Don Budge defeated (Germany) Gottfried von Cramm 6–1, 7–9, 6–1, 3–6, 6–1

=== Women's singles ===
(Chile) Anita Lizana defeated (Poland) Jadwiga Jędrzejowska 6–4, 6–2

=== Men's doubles ===
(Germany) Gottfried von Cramm / (Germany) Henner Henkel defeated (United States) Don Budge / (United States) Gene Mako 6–4, 7–5, 6–4

=== Women's doubles ===
(United States) Sarah Palfrey Cooke / (United States) Alice Marble defeated (United States) Marjorie Gladman Van Ryn / (United States) Carolin Babcock 7–5, 6–4

=== Mixed doubles ===
(United States) Sarah Palfrey Cooke / (United States) Don Budge defeated (France) Sylvie Jung Henrotin / (France) Yvon Petra 6–2, 8–10, 6–0

| Preceded by 1937 Wimbledon Championships | Grand Slams | Succeeded by 1938 Australian Championships |
