= 1939 Wimbledon Championships – Women's singles =

Women's singles
- 1939 Wimbledon Championships

Final
- Champion: (United States) Alice Marble
- Runner-up: (United Kingdom) Kay Stammers
- Score: 6–2, 6–0

Details
- Draw: 96 (10 Q )
- Seeds: 8

Events
Singles	men	women		boys	girls
Doubles	men	women	mixed	boys	girls
← 1938 ·	Wimbledon Championships	· 1946 →

Alice Marble defeated Kay Stammers in the final, 6–2, 6–0 to win the ladies' singles tennis title at the 1939 Wimbledon Championships. Helen Moody was the defending champion, but did not compete.

== Seeds ==
1. (United States) Alice Marble (champion)
2. (United States) Helen Jacobs (quarterfinals)
3. (Denmark) Hilde Sperling (semifinals)
4. (France) Simonne Mathieu (quarterfinals)
5. (Poland) Jadwiga Jędrzejowska (quarterfinals)
6. (United Kingdom) Kay Stammers (final)
7. (United Kingdom) Mary Hardwick (quarterfinals)
8. (France) Sarah Fabyan (semifinals)

Click on the seed number of a player to go to their draw section.

== Draw ==
=== Key ===
- Q = Qualifier
- WC = Wild card
- LL = Lucky loser
- Alt = Alternate
- SE = Special exempt
- PR = Protected ranking
- ITF = ITF entry
- JE = Junior exempt
- w/o = Walkover
- r = Retired
- d = Defaulted
- SR = Special ranking

=== Finals ===
Quarterfinals
2	(United States) Helen Jacobs	2	2
6	(United Kingdom) Kay Stammers	6	6
4	(France) Simonne Mathieu	4	2
8	(United States) Sarah Fabyan	6	6
7	(United Kingdom) Mary Hardwick	4	0
3	(Denmark) Hilde Sperling	6	6
5	(Poland) Jadwiga Jędrzejowska	1	4
1	(United States) Alice Marble	6	6

Semifinals
6	(United Kingdom) Kay Stammers	7	2	6
8	(United States) Sarah Fabyan	5	6	3
3	(Denmark) Hilde Sperling	0	0
1	(United States) Alice Marble	6	6

Final
6	(United Kingdom) Kay Stammers	2	0
1	(United States) Alice Marble	6	6

=== Top half ===
==== Section 1 ====
First round

Second round
2	(United States) Helen Jacobs	6	6
(United Kingdom) Elsa Haylock	0	2
(United Kingdom) Penny Durlac	4	7	8
Q	(United Kingdom) Joan Curry	6	5	10
(United Kingdom) Margot Lumb	6	6
(Kingdom of Yugoslavia) Alicia Florian	1	2
(United Kingdom) Betty Cooke	6	7
(United Kingdom) Joan Ingram	4	5

Third round
2	(United States) H Jacobs	6	6
Q	(United Kingdom) J Curry	3	2
(United Kingdom) M Lumb	6	6
(United Kingdom) B Cooke	3	3

Fourth round
2	(United States) H Jacobs	6	7
(United Kingdom) M Lumb	2	5

==== Section 2 ====
First round

Second round
6	(United Kingdom) Kay Stammers	6	6
Q	(United Kingdom) Edith Middleton	0	2
(Netherlands) Madzy Couquerque	5	3
(United Kingdom) Nina Brown	7	6
Q	(United Kingdom) Peggy Brace	4	2
(Italy) Wally San Donnino	6	6
(Germany) Thilde Dietz	5	3
(France) Sylvie Henrotin	7	6

Third round
6	(United Kingdom) K Stammers	6	6
(United Kingdom) N Brown	2	2
(Italy) W San Donnino	1	1
(France) S Henrotin	6	6

Fourth round
6	(United Kingdom) K Stammers	7	6
(France) S Henrotin	5	2

==== Section 3 ====
First round
4	(France) Simonne Mathieu	6	6
(Czechoslovakia) Eva Poráková	4	1
(United Kingdom) Audrey Roberts	5	1
(United Kingdom) Phyllis King	7	6
(United Kingdom) Betty Smith	4	4
(Hungary) Klára Somogyi	6	6
(United Kingdom) Phyllis Grover	0	10
(United Kingdom) Billie Yorke	6	12
Q	(Czechoslovakia) Liesl Herbst	2	0
(United Kingdom) Valerie Scott	6	6
(United Kingdom) Freda Underwood	2	5
(United Kingdom) Elsie Hamilton	6	7
(United Kingdom) Patience Thomson	2	0
(United Kingdom) Susan Noel	6	6
Q	(United Kingdom) Nancy Liebert	5	5
(Germany) Inge Schumann	7	7

Second round
4	(France) S Mathieu	6	6
(United Kingdom) P King	1	0
(Hungary) K Somogyi	6	6
(United Kingdom) A Yorke	2	4
(United Kingdom) V Scott	3	6	6
(United Kingdom) E Hamilton	6	0	1
(United Kingdom) S Noel	6	10
(Germany) I Schumann	4	8

Third round
4	(France) S Mathieu	6	6	6
(Hungary) K Somogyi	0	8	3
(United Kingdom) V Scott	6	3	6
(United Kingdom) S Noel	3	6	0

Fourth round
4	(France) S Mathieu	6	4	6
(United Kingdom) V Scott	3	6	2

==== Section 4 ====
First round
8	(United States) Sarah Fabyan	6	6
(United Kingdom) Mary Norman	2	2
(United Kingdom) Freda Hammersley	6	6
(United Kingdom) Betty Batt	3	2
(United Kingdom) Mary Sargeant	4	7	8
(United Kingdom) Mary Whitmarsh	6	5	6
(United Kingdom) Jean Nicoll	8	4	2
(United Kingdom) Denise Huntbach	6	6	6
(United Kingdom) Madge Slaney	6	6
(United Kingdom) Nora Maingay	3	1
(United Kingdom) Rosemary Smith	6	7
(United Kingdom) Audrey Cardinall	1	5
(United Kingdom) Joan Goss	3	5
(United States) Dorothy Andrus	6	7
(United Kingdom) Dorothy Little	6	8
(United Kingdom) Margot Stewart	1	6

Second round
8	(United States) S Fabyan	6	6
(United Kingdom) W Hammersley	2	3
(United Kingdom) M Sargeant	3	8
(United Kingdom) D Huntbach	6	10
(United Kingdom) M Slaney	6	6
(United Kingdom) R Smith	3	3
(United States) D Andrus	3	0
(United Kingdom) D Little	6	6

Third round
8	(United States) S Fabyan	6	6
(United Kingdom) D Huntbach	2	3
(United Kingdom) M Slaney	6	0	1
(United Kingdom) D Little	3	6	6

Fourth round
8	(United States) S Fabyan	6	3	6
(United Kingdom) D Little	1	6	2

=== Bottom half ===
==== Section 5 ====
First round
(United Kingdom) Nancy Macpherson-Grant	6	6
(United Kingdom) Muriel Harris	4	1
Q	(United Kingdom) Valerie Cooper	5	6	2
(United Kingdom) Betty Clements	7	2	6
(United Kingdom) Elsie Pittman	1	5
(United Kingdom) Rita Jarvis	6	7
Q	(United Kingdom) Margaret Lewis	4	5
(United Kingdom) Gladys Southwell	6	7
(United Kingdom) Alex McKelvie	7	2
(United Kingdom) Anita Ellis	9	6
(United States) Grace Wheeler	7	2	6
(United Kingdom) Betty Nuthall	5	6	2
(Luxembourg) Alice Weiwers	6	6
(United Kingdom) Yvonne Law	1	0
(United Kingdom) Rosemary Thomas	8	4
7	(United Kingdom) Mary Hardwick	10	6

Second round
(United Kingdom) N Macpherson-Grant	6	1	6
(United Kingdom) E Clements	3	6	4
(United Kingdom) R Jarvis	4	8	6
(United Kingdom) G Southwell	6	6	2
(United Kingdom) A Ellis	3	5
(United States) G Wheeler	6	7
(Luxembourg) A Weiwers	2	4
7	(United Kingdom) M Hardwick	6	6

Third round
(United Kingdom) N Macpherson-Grant	4	8	7
(United Kingdom) R Jarvis	6	6	5
(United States) G Wheeler	5	7
7	(United Kingdom) M Hardwick	7	9

Fourth round
(United Kingdom) N Macpherson-Grant	4	6
7	(United Kingdom) M Hardwick	6	8

==== Section 6 ====
First round
(United Kingdom) Jean Saunders	6	6
Q	(United Kingdom) Sonia Mavrogordato	2	1
(United Kingdom) Mollie Trouncer	6	6
(United Kingdom) Joan Strawson	3	1
(United Kingdom) Ermyntrude Harvey	6	1	4
(Romania) Magda Berescu	2	6	6
(United Kingdom) Evelyn Dearman	4	6	4
(United Kingdom) Patsy O'Connell	6	3	6
(United Kingdom) Molly James	1	2
(United Kingdom) Diana Wood	6	6
Q	(Republic of Ireland) Pamela Goodwyn	6	0	3
(France) Suzanne Pannetier	0	6	6
(United Kingdom) Effie Peters	7	6
(United Kingdom) Gaby Curtis	5	0
(United Kingdom) Gem Hoahing	2	0
3	(Denmark) Hilde Sperling	6	6

Second round
(United Kingdom) J Saunders	8	7
(United Kingdom) M Trouncer	6	5
(Romania) M Berescu	3	2
(United Kingdom) P O'Connell	6	6
(United Kingdom) D Wood	7	4	6
(France) S Pannetier	5	6	1
(United Kingdom) E Peters	3	0
3	(Denmark) H Sperling	6	6

Third round
(United Kingdom) J Saunders	6	3	6
(United Kingdom) P O'Connell	2	6	2
(United Kingdom) D Wood	3	1
3	(Denmark) H Sperling	6	6

Fourth round
(United Kingdom) J Saunders	2	4
3	(Denmark) H Sperling	6	6

==== Section 7 ====
First round

Second round
(United Kingdom) Thelma Jarvis	0	3
(United Kingdom) Mary Cartwright	6	6
(United Kingdom) Peggy Scriven	6	6
(Germany) Anneliese Ullstein	3	3
(Italy) Vittoria Tonolli	2	8	1
(Kingdom of Yugoslavia) Hella Kovač	6	6	6
(Belgium) Josane de Meulemeester	4	3
5	(Poland) Jadwiga Jędrzejowska	6	6

Third round
(United Kingdom) M Cartwright	3	3
(United Kingdom) M Scriven	6	6
(Kingdom of Yugoslavia) H Kovač	4	3
5	(Poland) J Jędrzejowska	6	6

Fourth round
(United Kingdom) M Scriven	3	2
5	(Poland) J Jędrzejowska	6	6

==== Section 8 ====
First round

Second round
(France) Arlette Halff	6	6
(United Kingdom) Doris Howard	4	2
(United Kingdom) Florence Smith	5	0
(United Kingdom) Nancy Glover	7	6
Q	(United Kingdom) Beryl Rodway	7	1	0
(United Kingdom) Dora Beazley	5	6	6
(United Kingdom) Ruth Kirk	3	2
1	(United States) Alice Marble	6	6

Third round
(France) A Halff	6	4	6
(United Kingdom) N Glover	3	6	1
(United Kingdom) D Beazley	4	3
1	(United States) A Marble	6	6

Fourth round
(France) A Halff	1	1
1	(United States) A Marble	6	6

Preceded by 1939 French Championships	Grand Slams; Women's Singles	Succeeded by 1939 U.S. National Championships
