= 1938 U.S. National Championships – Women's singles =

Women's singles
- 1938 U.S. National Championships

Final
- Champion: (United States) Alice Marble
- Runner-up: (Australia) Nancye Wynne
- Score: 6–0, 6–3

Details
- Draw: 64
- Seeds: 16

Events
| Singles | men | women |
| Doubles | men | women |
| ← 1937 · | U.S. National Championships | · 1939 → |

Second-seeded Alice Marble defeated Nancye Wynne 6–0, 6–3 in the final to win the women's singles tennis title at the 1938 U.S. National Championships.

== Seeds ==
The tournament used two lists of eight players for seeding the women's singles event; one for U.S. players and one for foreign players. Alice Marble is the champion; others show in brackets the round in which they were eliminated.

1. (United States) Helen Jacobs (third round)
2. (United States) Alice Marble (champion)
3. (United States) Dorothy Bundy (semifinals)
4. (United States) Sarah Fabyan (semifinals)
5. (United States) Gracyn Wheeler (third round)
6. (United States) Barbara Winslow (third round)
7. (United States) Helen Pedersen (third round)
8. (United States) Dorothy Workman (third round)
1. (Poland) Jadwiga Jędrzejowska (quarterfinals)
2. (France) Simonne Mathieu (quarterfinals)
3. (United Kingdom) Kay Stammers (quarterfinals)
4. (Australia) Nancye Wynne (finalist)
5. (Australia) Thelma Coyne (third round)
6. (United Kingdom) Margot Lumb (quarterfinals)
7. (Australia) Nell Hopman (third round)
8. (Australia) Dorothy Stevenson (third round)

== Draw ==
=== Final eight ===
Quarterfinals
(6) | (United Kingdom) Margot Lumb | 4 | 7 | 1
(4) | (Australia) Nancye Wynne | 6 | 5 | 6
3 | (United States) Dorothy Bundy | 6 | 3 | 6
(2) | (France) Simonne Mathieu | 3 | 6 | 0
2 | (United States) Alice Marble | 6 | 6 | 6
(3) | (United Kingdom) Kay Stammers | 8 | 3 | 0
4 | (United States) Sarah Fabyan | 6 | 6
(1) | (Poland) Jadwiga Jędrzejowska | 1 | 4

Semifinals
(4) | (Australia) Nancye Wynne | 5 | 6 | 8
3 | (United States) Dorothy Bundy | 7 | 4 | 6
2 | (United States) Alice Marble | 5 | 7 | 7
4 | (United States) Sarah Fabyan | 7 | 5 | 5

Finals
(4) | (Australia) Nancye Wynne | 0 | 3
2 | (United States) Alice Marble | 6 | 6

| Preceded by 1938 Wimbledon Championships – Women's singles | Grand Slam women's singles | Succeeded by 1939 Australian Championships – Women's singles |
