= 1938 Wimbledon Championships – Men's doubles =

Gentlemen's doubles tennis title at the 1938 Wimbledon Championship

Men's doubles
- 1938 Wimbledon Championships

Final
- Champions: (United States) Don Budge (United States) Gene Mako
- Runners-up: (Germany) Henner Henkel (Germany) Georg von Metaxa
- Score: 6–4, 3–6, 6–3, 8–6

Details
- Draw: 64 (5Q)
- Seeds: 4

Events
Singles	men	women		boys	girls
Doubles	men	women	mixed	boys	girls
- Wimbledon Championships

Don Budge and Gene Mako successfully defended their title, defeating Henner Henkel and Georg von Metaxa in the final, 6–4, 3–6, 6–3, 8–6 to win the gentlemen's doubles tennis title at the 1938 Wimbledon Championship.

== Seeds ==
1. (United States) Don Budge / (United States) Gene Mako (champions)
2. (Czechoslovakia) Ladislav Hecht / (Czechoslovakia) Roderich Menzel (third round)
3. (Kingdom of Yugoslavia) Dragutin Mitić / (Kingdom of Yugoslavia) Franjo Punčec (second round)
4. (Germany) Henner Henkel / (Germany) Georg von Metaxa (final)

Click on the seed number of a player to go to their draw section.

== Draw ==
Key

- Q = Qualifier
- WC = Wild card
- LL = Lucky loser
- Alt = Alternate
- ITF = ITF entry
- PR = Protected ranking
- SR = Special ranking
- SE = Special exempt
- JE = Junior exempt
- JR = Junior Accelerator Programme entrant
- CO = College Accelerator Programme entrant
- NG = Next Gen Accelerator Program entrant
- w/o = Walkover
- r = Retired
- d = Defaulted

=== Finals ===
Quarterfinals
1	(United States) Don Budge (United States) Gene Mako	6	6	6
(Netherlands) Tod Hughan (Netherlands) Hans van Swol	2	3	0
(United Kingdom) Pat Hughes (United Kingdom) Frank Wilde	6	6	6	7
(Czechoslovakia) František Cejnar (New Zealand) Cam Malfroy	8	2	2	5
(Hungary) György Dallos (Hungary) Ottó Szigeti	4	6	7
4	(Germany) Henner Henkel (Germany) Georg von Metaxa	6	8	9
(Kingdom of Yugoslavia) Franjo Kukuljević (Kingdom of Yugoslavia) Josip Palada	6	10	6
(United Kingdom) Brian Sturgeon (United Kingdom) Gwyn Tuckett	3	8	4

Semifinals
1	(United States) Don Budge (United States) Gene Mako	6	6	12
(United Kingdom) Pat Hughes (United Kingdom) Frank Wilde	2	4	10
4	(Germany) Henner Henkel (Germany) Georg von Metaxa	7	6	6
(Kingdom of Yugoslavia) Franjo Kukuljević (Kingdom of Yugoslavia) Josip Palada	5	2	4

Final
1	(United States) Don Budge (United States) Gene Mako	6	3	6	8
4	(Germany) Henner Henkel (Germany) Georg von Metaxa	4	6	3	6

=== Top half ===
==== Section 1 ====
First round
1	(United States) Don Budge (United States) Gene Mako	6	6	6
(Belgium) Léopold de Borman (Belgium) Pierre Geelhand de Merxem	3	4	4
(Monaco) Vladimir Landau (Monaco) Gaston Médécin	3	5	3
(Hungary) Mihály Csikós (Germany) Heinrich Kleinschroth	6	7	6
(Republic of China (1912–1949)) Kho Sin-Kie (Republic of Ireland) George Lyttleton-Rogers	6	6	4	6
(United Kingdom) Murray Deloford (United Kingdom) Jimmy Jones	4	2	6	3
(United Kingdom) Guy Cooper (United Kingdom) Eric Peters	8	1	3
(France) Jean Borotra (France) Jacques Brugnon	10	6	6
(United Kingdom) Reginald Bessemer-Clark (Australia) Alan Coldham	4	6	10	2	0
(Japan) Tamio Abe (United Kingdom) Kenneth Gandar-Dower	6	2	8	6	6
(Romania) Alexandru Hamburger (Belgium) Jean Moreau	6	2	2	3
(United Kingdom) Cliff Hovell (United Kingdom) Pat Sherwood	3	6	6	6
(Netherlands) Tod Hughan (Netherlands) Hans van Swol	2	6	6	6
(United Kingdom) Cecil Betts (United Kingdom) Jimmy Reddall	6	3	4	4
Q	(United Kingdom) Maurice Lucking (United Kingdom) Desmond Morris	7	4	3	3
(India) Ghaus Mohammad (India) Subba Sawhney	5	6	6	6

Second round
1	(United States) D Budge (United States) G Mako	6	6	6
(Hungary) M Csikós (Germany) H Kleinschroth	0	1	0
(Republic of China (1912–1949)) S-K Kho (Republic of Ireland) G Lyttleton-Rogers	2	14	6	6	2
(France) J Borotra (France) J Brugnon	6	16	2	3	6
(Japan) T Abe (United Kingdom) K Gandar-Dower	8	19	0
(United Kingdom) C Hovell (United Kingdom) P Sherwood	10	21	6
(Netherlands) T Hughan (Netherlands) A van Swol	6	6	4	3	6
(India) G Mohammad (India) S Sawhney	3	3	6	6	4

Third round
1	(United States) D Budge (United States) G Mako	6	6	7
(France) J Borotra (France) J Brugnon	3	4	5
(United Kingdom) C Hovell (United Kingdom) P Sherwood	5	1	5
(Netherlands) T Hughan (Netherlands) A van Swol	7	6	7

Quarterfinals
1	(United States) D Budge (United States) G Mako	6	6	6
(Netherlands) T Hughan (Netherlands) A van Swol	2	3	0

==== Section 2 ====
First round
3	(Kingdom of Yugoslavia) Dragutin Mitić (Kingdom of Yugoslavia) Franjo Punčec	6	6	5	6
(Brazil) Alcides Procópio (United Kingdom) Laurie Shaffi	1	1	7	1
(Germany) Rolf Göpfert (Germany) Engelbert Koch	0	4	2
(United Kingdom) Pat Hughes (United Kingdom) Frank Wilde	6	6	6
Q	(United Kingdom) Freddie Della Porta (United Kingdom) Leslie Walter	6	4	10	6
(New Zealand) Dewar Brown (New Zealand) Dennis Coombe	3	6	8	3
(Germany) Daniel Prenn (United States) Bill Robertson	2	4	4
(United Kingdom) Ted Avory (United Kingdom) Harry Lee	6	6	6
(Switzerland) Hector Fisher (Switzerland) Werner Steiner	6	6	6	4	6
(United Kingdom) Jimmy Hunt (United Kingdom) Colin Ritchie	2	8	4	6	2
(United Kingdom) John Olliff (United Kingdom) Bob Tinkler	6	6	6
Q	(United Kingdom) Jack Hamilton (United Kingdom) Derrick Leyland	3	2	4
(United Kingdom) Laddie Wheatcroft (United Kingdom) Bill Manby	2	6	2	4
(Czechoslovakia) František Cejnar (New Zealand) Cam Malfroy	6	4	6	6
(United Kingdom) Harley Watkins (Australia) Mervyn Weston	7	3	7	4
(Japan) Yasumine Kuramitsu (Japan) Fumiteru Nakano	9	6	5	6

Second round
3	(Kingdom of Yugoslavia) D Mitić (Kingdom of Yugoslavia) F Punčec	6	2	4
(United Kingdom) P Hughes (United Kingdom) F Wilde	8	6	6
Q	(United Kingdom) A Della Porta (United Kingdom) L Walter	3	2	5
(United Kingdom) E Avory (United Kingdom) H Lee	6	6	7
(Switzerland) H Fisher (Switzerland) W Steiner	3	3	6	6	1
(United Kingdom) J Olliff (United Kingdom) R Tinkler	6	6	3	1	6
(Czechoslovakia) F Cejnar (New Zealand) C Malfroy	6	6	3	6
(Japan) Y Kuramitsu (Japan) F Nakano	3	2	6	3

Third round
(United Kingdom) P Hughes (United Kingdom) F Wilde	6	6	6
(United Kingdom) E Avory (United Kingdom) H Lee	3	3	3
(United Kingdom) J Olliff (United Kingdom) R Tinkler	1	5	2
(Czechoslovakia) F Cejnar (New Zealand) C Malfroy	6	7	6

Quarterfinals
(United Kingdom) P Hughes (United Kingdom) F Wilde	6	6	6	7
(Czechoslovakia) F Cejnar (New Zealand) C Malfroy	8	2	2	5

=== Bottom half ===
==== Section 3 ====
First round
(France) Henri Bolelli (France) Christian Boussus	7	6	6
(United Kingdom) Edmund David (United Kingdom) Herman David	5	4	4
(United Kingdom) Roland Morton (United Kingdom) Norman Taylor	2	1	6	4
(United Kingdom) Harold Hare (United Kingdom) Claude Lister	6	6	4	6
(Hungary) György Dallos (Hungary) Ottó Szigeti	6	3	8	6
(United Kingdom) Henry Billington (United Kingdom) Don Butler	4	6	6	3
(Republic of Ireland) Raymond Egan (Belgium) Jack Van den Eynde	2	11	3
(United Kingdom) Derek Bull (United Kingdom) CF Duncan	6	13	6
(Switzerland) Charles Aeschlimann (South Africa) Walter Musgrove	0	6	2	6	3
(India) Leonard Brooke Edwards (India) Ranbir Singh	6	1	6	4	6
(United Kingdom) Eric Filby (United Kingdom) Ronnie Shayes	6	4	8	8
(Argentina) Hector Etchart (Argentina) Alejo Russell	4	6	6	6
(Uruguay) Sebastian Harreguy (Uruguay) Eduardo Stanham	6	3	3	2
(United Kingdom) Dickie Ritchie (United Kingdom) Nigel Sharpe	4	6	6	6
(Switzerland) Max Ellmer (Switzerland) Boris Maneff	6	2	4	5
4	(Germany) Henner Henkel (Germany) Georg von Metaxa	3	6	6	7

Second round
(France) H Bolelli (France) C Boussus	6	8	6
(United Kingdom) H Hare (United Kingdom) C Lister	2	6	1
(Hungary) G Dallos (Hungary) O Szigeti	6	7	6
(United Kingdom) D Bull (United Kingdom) CF Duncan	3	5	2
(India) L Brooke Edwards (India) R Singh	4	5	4
(United Kingdom) E Filby (United Kingdom) R Shayes	6	7	6
(United Kingdom) R Ritchie (United Kingdom) N Sharpe	0	4	6
4	(Germany) H Henkel (Germany) G von Metaxa	6	6	8

Third round
(France) H Bolelli (France) C Boussus	6	8	3	1
(Hungary) G Dallos (Hungary) O Szigeti	1	10	6	6
(United Kingdom) E Filby (United Kingdom) R Shayes	3	2	7	2
4	(Germany) H Henkel (Germany) G von Metaxa	6	6	5	6

Quarterfinals
(Hungary) G Dallos (Hungary) O Szigeti	4	6	7
4	(Germany) H Henkel (Germany) G von Metaxa	6	8	9

==== Section 4 ====
First round
(United Kingdom) Henry Burrows (United Kingdom) Jack Harrison	4	2	6	6	6
(United Kingdom) George Godsell (United Kingdom) Jack Lysaght	6	6	3	2	8
(Republic of China (1912–1949)) Choy Wai-Chuen (Republic of China (1912–1949)) Ho Jin	3	4	6
(Kingdom of Yugoslavia) Franjo Kukuljević (Kingdom of Yugoslavia) Josip Palada	6	6	8
Q	(United Kingdom) Tommy Anderson (United Kingdom) TC Braithwaite	6	9	3	7
(United Kingdom) PD Eeman (Greece) Georgios Nikolaides	1	7	6	5
(United Kingdom) Bob Mulliken (United Kingdom) Jack Piercy	6	6	6
(United Kingdom) Ralph Nichols (United Kingdom) David Williams	4	1	1
Q	(United Kingdom) Thomas Henderson-Brooks (United Kingdom) Guy Pettigrew	4	4	2
(United Kingdom) Brian Sturgeon (United Kingdom) Gwyn Tuckett	6	6	6
(United States) Owen Anderson (United States) Lawrence Nelson	3	6	6	6
(United Kingdom) Michael Condon (Australia) Leonard King	6	0	3	2
(United Kingdom) Ian Collins (United Kingdom) Donald MacPhail	6	6	6
(United Kingdom) Jock Findlay (United Kingdom) Lewis Michell	4	1	2
(United Kingdom) Alan Brown (United Kingdom) John Comery	3	4	6
2	(Czechoslovakia) Ladislav Hecht (Czechoslovakia) Roderich Menzel	6	6	8

Second round
(United Kingdom) G Godsell (United Kingdom) J Lysaght	3	4	6
(Kingdom of Yugoslavia) F Kukuljević (Kingdom of Yugoslavia) J Palada	6	6	8
Q	(United Kingdom) T Anderson (United Kingdom) TC Braithwaite	5	5	4
(United Kingdom) R Mulliken (United Kingdom) J Piercy	7	7	6
(United Kingdom) B Sturgeon (United Kingdom) G Tuckett	6	9	7	6
(United States) O Anderson (United States) L Nelson	3	7	9	0
(United Kingdom) I Collins (United Kingdom) D MacPhail	7	1	3
2	(Czechoslovakia) L Hecht (Czechoslovakia) R Menzel	9	6	6

Third round
(Kingdom of Yugoslavia) F Kukuljević (Kingdom of Yugoslavia) J Palada	6	8	5	6
(United Kingdom) R Mulliken (United Kingdom) J Piercy	4	6	7	4
(United Kingdom) B Sturgeon (United Kingdom) G Tuckett	8	6	6
2	(Czechoslovakia) L Hecht (Czechoslovakia) R Menzel	6	4	4

Quarterfinals
(Kingdom of Yugoslavia) F Kukuljević (Kingdom of Yugoslavia) J Palada	6	10	6
(United Kingdom) B Sturgeon (United Kingdom) G Tuckett	3	8	4
