= 1938 Wimbledon Championships – Men's singles =

Men's singles
- 1938 Wimbledon Championships

Final
- Champion: (United States) Don Budge
- Runner-up: (United Kingdom) Bunny Austin
- Score: 6–1, 6–0, 6–3

Details
- Draw: 128 (10Q)
- Seeds: 8

Events
Singles	men	women		boys	girls
Doubles	men	women	mixed	boys	girls
- Wimbledon Championships

Defending champion Don Budge defeated Bunny Austin in the final, 6–1, 6–0, 6–3 to win the gentlemen's singles tennis title at the 1938 Wimbledon Championships. Austin was the last British man to reach the Wimbledon singles final until Andy Murray in 2012.

== Seeds ==
1. (United States) Don Budge (champion)
2. (United Kingdom) Bunny Austin (final)
3. (Czechoslovakia) Roderich Menzel (fourth round)
4. (Germany) Henner Henkel (semifinals)
5. (Kingdom of Yugoslavia) Franjo Punčec (semifinals)
6. (Kingdom of Yugoslavia) Dragutin Mitić (fourth round)
7. (Czechoslovakia) Ladislav Hecht (quarterfinals)
8. (Republic of China (1912–1949)) Kho Sin-Kie (fourth round)

Click on the seed number of a player to go to their draw section.

== Draw ==
Key

- Q = Qualifier
- WC = Wild card
- LL = Lucky loser
- Alt = Alternate
- ITF = ITF entry
- PR = Protected ranking
- SR = Special ranking
- SE = Special exempt
- JE = Junior exempt
- JR = Junior Accelerator Programme entrant
- CO = College Accelerator Programme entrant
- NG = Next Gen Accelerator Program entrant
- w/o = Walkover
- r = Retired
- d = Defaulted

=== Finals ===
Quarterfinals
2	(United Kingdom) Bunny Austin	6	6	6
(Switzerland) Max Ellmer	2	1	2
4	(Germany) Henner Henkel	7	6	6
7	(Czechoslovakia) Ladislav Hecht	5	1	2
5	(Kingdom of Yugoslavia) Franjo Punčec	6	6	6
(United Kingdom) Donald MacPhail	2	1	1
(Czechoslovakia) František Cejnar	3	0	5
1	(United States) Don Budge	6	6	7

Semifinals
2	(United Kingdom) Bunny Austin	6	6	6
4	(Germany) Henner Henkel	2	4	0
5	(Kingdom of Yugoslavia) Franjo Punčec	2	1	4
1	(United States) Don Budge	6	6	6

Final
2	(United Kingdom) Bunny Austin	1	0	3
1	(United States) Don Budge	6	6	6

=== Top half ===
==== Section 1 ====
First round
2	(United Kingdom) Bunny Austin	4	6	3	6	6
(United Kingdom) Eric Filby	6	1	6	4	3
(United Kingdom) Henry Burrows	3	5	3
Q	(United Kingdom) Jack Darkins	6	7	6
Q	(United Kingdom) Reginald Bessemer-Clark	2	6	1	6	6
(Australia) Leonard King	6	1	6	4	2
(United Kingdom) John Comery	6	6	6
Q	(India) Jimmay Mehta	2	2	4
(United Kingdom) Dennis Cook	1	2	0
(United States) Gene Mako	6	6	6
(New Zealand) Cam Malfroy	6	6	6
Q	(United Kingdom) Jack Moore	1	2	2
(India) Donald Rutnam	1	2	5
Q	(United Kingdom) Thomas Henderson-Brooks	6	6	7
(Germany) Engelbert Koch	6	2	6	6
(Italy) Alberto del Bono	2	6	3	1

Second round
2	(United Kingdom) H Austin	6	6	6
Q	(United Kingdom) J Darkins	4	4	4
Q	(United Kingdom) R Bessemer-Clark	0	4	1
(United Kingdom) J Comery	6	6	6
(United States) G Mako	4	6	6	4	6
(New Zealand) C Malfroy	6	3	4	6	2
Q	(United Kingdom) T Henderson-Brooks	6	1	4	9	6
(Germany) E Koch	4	6	6	7	0

Third round
2	(United Kingdom) H Austin	6	6	6
(United Kingdom) J Comery	1	1	3
(United States) G Mako	6	6	5	6
Q	(United Kingdom) T Henderson-Brooks	2	3	7	2

Fourth round
2	(United Kingdom) H Austin	6	4	9	0	6
(United States) G Mako	4	6	7	6	4

==== Section 2 ====
First round
6	(Kingdom of Yugoslavia) Dragutin Mitić	3	6	6	6
(Australia) Mervyn Weston	6	4	1	4
(Argentina) Alejo Russell	10	6	7	6
(Czechoslovakia) Jaroslav Drobný	8	4	9	3
(Brazil) Alcides Procópio	6	7	6
(Belgium) Léopold de Borman	3	5	0
(Republic of Ireland) Raymond Egan	9	4	7
(Uruguay) Sebastian Harreguy	11	6	9
(Japan) Yasumine Kuramitsu	4	5	4
(Switzerland) Max Ellmer	6	7	6
Q	(United Kingdom) Keith Lavarack	1	2	2
(United Kingdom) Roland Morton	6	6	6
(United Kingdom) Guy Cooper	1	1	3
(United Kingdom) Brian Sturgeon	6	6	6
(India) Subba Sawhney	6	7	6
(United Kingdom) Maurice Lucking	3	5	3

Second round
6	(Kingdom of Yugoslavia) D Mitić	6	6	6	3	6
(Argentina) A Russell	8	0	3	6	4
(Brazil) A Procópio	2	7	6	7
(Uruguay) S Harreguy	6	5	4	5
(Switzerland) M Ellmer	7	6	6
(United Kingdom) R Morton	5	0	1
(United Kingdom) B Sturgeon	6	4	3	2
(India) S Sawhney	3	6	6	6

Third round
6	(Kingdom of Yugoslavia) D Mitić	4	6	6	6
(Brazil) A Procópio	6	2	0	0
(Switzerland) M Ellmer	6	6	6
(India) S Sawhney	2	2	1

Fourth round
6	(Kingdom of Yugoslavia) D Mitić	6	2	5	6	2
(Switzerland) M Ellmer	3	6	7	1	6

==== Section 3 ====
First round
4	(Germany) Henner Henkel	6	6	6
(United Kingdom) Derek Bull	2	0	2
(No citizenship) Daniel Prenn	6	6	5	1	4
(United Kingdom) Murray Deloford	4	4	7	6	6
(United Kingdom) Laurie Shaffi	3	1	5
(France) Christian Boussus	6	6	7
(Hungary) Ottó Szigeti	6	1	2	6	3
(United Kingdom) Bobby Meredith	3	6	6	2	6
(United States) Bill Robertson	3	4	6	3
(Switzerland) Boris Maneff	6	6	1	6
Q	(United Kingdom) Tommy Anderson	6	8	9
(United Kingdom) Cecil Betts	4	6	7
(United Kingdom) Eric Peters	3	6	6	1	6
(United Kingdom) Bob Mulliken	6	4	3	6	4
(India) Ranbir Singh	6	6	2	7
(Republic of China (1912–1949)) Ho Jin	1	3	6	5

Second round
4	(Germany) H Henkel	6	6	6
(United Kingdom) M Deloford	3	1	3
(France) C Boussus	6	6	6
(United Kingdom) G Meredith	4	3	3
(Switzerland) B Maneff	6	5	6	6
Q	(United Kingdom) T Anderson	1	7	2	4
(United Kingdom) E Peters	2	6	5	3
(India) R Singh	6	4	7	6

Third round
4	(Germany) H Henkel	6	6	6
(France) C Boussus	2	3	2
(Switzerland) B Maneff	6	3	6	6
(India) R Singh	3	6	2	1

Fourth round
4	(Germany) H Henkel	6	6	6
(Switzerland) B Maneff	3	1	1

==== Section 4 ====
First round
7	(Czechoslovakia) Ladislav Hecht	6	6	6
LL	(United Kingdom) Derrick Leyland	4	3	4
(Belgium) Jack Van den Eynde	6	6	6
(United Kingdom) John Collins	2	3	3
(United Kingdom) Edmund David	5	1	2
(United Kingdom) Nigel Sharpe	7	6	6
(United Kingdom) Herman David	3	2	6	5
(United Kingdom) Bob Tinkler	6	6	2	7
(Japan) Fumiteru Nakano	6	6	6
(Monaco) Gaston Médécin	1	1	2
(United Kingdom) Gwyn Tuckett	1	8	1	6	6
(Netherlands) Tod Hughan	6	6	6	4	4
(Kingdom of Yugoslavia) Franjo Kukuljević	2	2	6	6	6
(United Kingdom) Don Butler	6	6	3	4	2
(South Africa) Walter Musgrove	6	3	4	2
(United States) Lawrence Nelson	3	6	6	6

Second round
7	(Czechoslovakia) L Hecht	6	6	6
(Belgium) J Van den Eynde	2	4	4
(United Kingdom) N Sharpe	6	6	9
(United Kingdom) R Tinkler	3	3	7
(Japan) F Nakano	6	6	12
(United Kingdom) G Tuckett	2	4	10
(Kingdom of Yugoslavia) F Kukuljević	6	6	6
(United States) L Nelson	1	1	4

Third round
7	(Czechoslovakia) L Hecht	6	6	5	6
(United Kingdom) N Sharpe	3	4	7	1
(Japan) F Nakano	3	5	8	3
(Kingdom of Yugoslavia) F Kukuljević	6	7	6	6

Fourth round
7	(Czechoslovakia) L Hecht	6	3	6	6
(Kingdom of Yugoslavia) F Kukuljević	4	6	3	4

=== Bottom half ===
==== Section 5 ====
First round
(United Kingdom) Colin Ritchie	6	8	2	6
(Argentina) Hector Etchart	4	6	6	2
(Germany) Rolf Göpfert	6	3	6	4	6
(India) Yubishthira Singh	2	6	3	6	3
(Japan) Tamio Abe	6	8	6
(United Kingdom) David Williams	0	6	3
(United Kingdom) Dickie Ritchie	1	4	6	2
(United Kingdom) John Olliff	6	6	4	6
(Hungary) Mihály Csikós	6	4	3	6	7
(Greece) Georgios Nikolaides	4	6	6	3	5
(United States) Owen Anderson	6	6	4	6
(Australia) Alan Coldham	2	4	6	3
(United Kingdom) Jimmy Hunt	6	1	3	1
Q	(Norway) Sigurd Rinde	4	6	6	6
(France) Jacques Brugnon	3	2	4
5	(Kingdom of Yugoslavia) Franjo Punčec	6	6	6

Second round
(United Kingdom) C Ritchie	2	3	0
(Germany) R Göpfert	6	6	6
(Japan) T Abe	4	3	4
(United Kingdom) J Olliff	6	6	6
(Hungary) M Csikós	2	0	4
(United States) O Anderson	6	6	6
Q	(Norway) S Rinde	1	4	1
5	(Kingdom of Yugoslavia) F Punčec	6	6	6

Third round
(Germany) R Göpfert	2	6	4	3
(United Kingdom) J Olliff	6	2	6	6
(United States) O Anderson	5	3	6	6	4
5	(Kingdom of Yugoslavia) F Punčec	7	6	4	3	6

Fourth round
(United Kingdom) J Olliff	3	3	0
5	(Kingdom of Yugoslavia) F Punčec	6	6	6

==== Section 6 ====
First round
(United Kingdom) Ted Avory	6	6	6
(United Kingdom) Henry Weatherall	1	3	2
(United Kingdom) Jack Piercy	4	4	2
(Belgium) Pierre Geelhand de Merxem	6	6	6
(United Kingdom) Donald MacPhail	6	6	6
(Netherlands) Hans van Swol	3	4	2
(United Kingdom) Harry Lee	6	6	3	6
(New Zealand) Dewar Brown	4	4	6	3
(United Kingdom) Norman Taylor	1	6	3
(United Kingdom) Jimmy Jones	6	8	6
(United Kingdom) Claude Lister	4	6	2	6	6
(Switzerland) Werner Steiner	6	4	6	2	2
Q	(Romania) Alexandru Hamburger	4	6	2	3
(Republic of China (1912–1949)) Choy Wai-Chuen	6	2	6	6
(United Kingdom) Gordon Fitt	3	5	3
3	(Czechoslovakia) Roderich Menzel	6	7	6

Second round
(United Kingdom) E Avory	6	10	7
(Belgium) P Geelhand de Merxem	4	8	5
(United Kingdom) D MacPhail	6	6	2	6
(United Kingdom) H Lee	3	3	6	1
(United Kingdom) C Jones	6	6	2	6
(United Kingdom) C Lister	2	2	6	1
(Republic of China (1912–1949)) W-C Choy	5	6	6	2	6
3	(Czechoslovakia) R Menzel	7	3	4	6	8

Third round
(United Kingdom) E Avory	2	3	1
(United Kingdom) D MacPhail	6	6	6
(United Kingdom) C Jones	3	2	6	10	5
3	(Czechoslovakia) R Menzel	6	6	4	8	7

Fourth round
(United Kingdom) D MacPhail	6	9	0
3	(Czechoslovakia) R Menzel	8	7	0^{r}

==== Section 7 ====
First round
Q	(United Kingdom) Cliff Hovell	3	6	3	6	3
(New Zealand) Dennis Coombe	6	4	6	4	6
(Czechoslovakia) František Cejnar	6	6	6
(Monaco) Vladimir Landau	2	4	2
(Netherlands) R de Brauw	3	1	4
(India) Ghaus Mohammad	6	6	6
(France) Henri Bolelli	6	6	6
(India) Leonard Brooke Edwards	4	2	1
(Belgium) Jean Moreau	3	3	2
(United Kingdom) Bob Higgin	6	6	6
(United Kingdom) Ian Collins	6	6	6
(United Kingdom) Bert Whitney	1	4	1
(United Kingdom) Frank Wilde	6	3	7	5
(Germany) Georg von Metaxa	4	6	9	7
(United Kingdom) Harold Hare	3	4	4
8	(Republic of China (1912–1949)) Kho Sin-Kie	6	6	6

Second round
(New Zealand) D Coombe	0	4	6	6	3
(Czechoslovakia) F Cejnar	6	6	3	4	6
(India) G Mohammad	2	6	6	6
(France) H Bolelli	6	2	3	2
(United Kingdom) R Higgin	6	2	4
(United Kingdom) I Collins	8	6	6
(Germany) G von Metaxa	4	6	4	4
8	(Republic of China (1912–1949)) S-K Kho	6	3	6	6

Third round
(Czechoslovakia) F Cejnar	6	6	11
(India) G Mohammad	2	4	9
(United Kingdom) I Collins	10	2	6	2
8	(Republic of China (1912–1949)) S-K Kho	8	6	8	6

Fourth round
(Czechoslovakia) F Cejnar	7	3	3	6	6
8	(Republic of China (1912–1949)) S-K Kho	5	6	6	1	3

==== Section 8 ====
First round
(United Kingdom) Laddie Wheatcroft	4	3	3
(United Kingdom) George Godsell	6	6	6
(United Kingdom) PD Eeman	6	4	1	4
(United Kingdom) Arnold England	3	6	6	6
(United Kingdom) Jack Lysaght	1	6	6	6
(Hungary) György Dallos	6	2	1	4
(United Kingdom) Ronald Shayes	6	2	6	7
(United Kingdom) Pat Sherwood	0	6	3	5
(Republic of Ireland) George Lyttleton-Rogers	6	2	6	6
(United Kingdom) Stan Clark	4	6	1	3
(Kingdom of Yugoslavia) Josip Palada	6	3	6	6
(Switzerland) Hector Fisher	1	6	3	4
(United Kingdom) Jack Harrison	4	3	4
(United Kingdom) Henry Billington	6	6	6
(United Kingdom) Kenneth Gandar-Dower	2	3	3
1	(United States) Don Budge	6	6	6

Second round
(United Kingdom) G Godsell	6	6	6
(United Kingdom) A England	2	4	0
(United Kingdom) J Lysaght	4	4	4
(United Kingdom) R Shayes	6	6	6
(Republic of Ireland) G Lyttleton-Rogers	7	0	6	6
(Kingdom of Yugoslavia) J Palada	5	6	4	3
(United Kingdom) H Billington	5	1	1
1	(United States) D Budge	7	6	6

Third round
(United Kingdom) G Godsell	6	3	4	4
(United Kingdom) R Shayes	2	6	6	6
(Republic of Ireland) G Lyttleton-Rogers	0	5	1
1	(United States) D Budge	6	7	6

Fourth round
(United Kingdom) R Shayes	3	4	1
1	(United States) D Budge	6	6	6

Preceded by 1938 French Championships	Grand Slams; Men's Singles	Succeeded by 1938 U.S. Championships
