= 1939 U.S. National Championships (tennis) =

- Date: September 7–17
- Edition: 59th
- Category: Grand Slam (ITF)
- Surface: Grass
- Location: Forest Hills, Queens; New York City, New York
- Venue: West Side Tennis Club

Champions

Men's singles
- (United States) Bobby Riggs

Women's singles
- (United States) Alice Marble

Men's doubles
- (Australia) Adrian Quist / (Australia) John Bromwich

Women's doubles
- (United States) Sarah Palfrey / (United States) Alice Marble

Mixed doubles
- (United States) Alice Marble / (Australia) Harry Hopman
← 1938 ·	U.S. National Championships	· 1940 →

The 1939 U.S. National Championships (now known as the US Open) was a tennis tournament that took place on the outdoor grass courts at the West Side Tennis Club, Forest Hills in New York City, New York. The tournament ran from September 7 until September 17. It was the 59th staging of the U.S. National Championships and the fourth Grand Slam tennis event of the year.

== Finals ==
=== Men's singles ===
(United States) Bobby Riggs defeated (United States) Welby van Horn 6–4, 6–2, 6–4

=== Women's singles ===
(United States) Alice Marble defeated (United States) Helen Jacobs 6–0, 8–10, 6–4

=== Men's doubles ===
(Australia) Adrian Quist / (Australia) John Bromwich defeated (Australia) Jack Crawford / (Australia) Harry Hopman 8–6, 6–1, 6–4

=== Women's doubles ===
(United States) Sarah Palfrey / (United States) Alice Marble defeated (United Kingdom) Kay Stammers / (United Kingdom) Freda James Hammersley 7–5, 8–6

=== Mixed doubles ===
(United States) Alice Marble / (Australia) Harry Hopman defeated (United States) Sarah Palfrey / (United States) Elwood Cooke 9–7, 6–1

Preceded by 1939 Wimbledon Championships	Grand Slams	Succeeded by 1940 Australian Championships
