= Virginia Wolfenden =

American tennis player

- Country (sports): United States
- Born: May 30, 1918; San Francisco, California
- Died: February 23, 2008 (aged 89); Pleasant Hill, California
- Plays: Right-handed

Singles
- Highest ranking: No. 10 (1939)

Grand Slam singles results
- US Open: SF (1939)

Doubles

Grand Slam doubles results
- US Open: QF (1941)

Grand Slam mixed doubles results
- US Open: SF (1944, 1946)

Virginia May Edwards (nee Wolfenden; May 30, 1918 – February 23, 2008) was an American tennis player. She competed as Virginia Kovacs during her first marriage, to tour player Frank Kovacs.

Born in San Francisco, Wolfenden was a two-time winner of the Pacific Coast Championships, ranking as high as fifth nationally and tenth in the world. In 1939 she upset the fourth-seeded Dorothy Bundy in the quarter-finals of the U.S. national championships, before losing her semi-final match to world number one Alice Marble. She took time away from the tour after her marriage to Frank Kovacs and gave birth in 1942 to a baby boy (Frank Jr). In 1946 she beat Dorothy Head in the final of a Philadelphia tournament and she also claimed the Tri-State title that year.
