= Boris Maneff =

Swiss tennis player

- Country (sports): Switzerland
- Born: 1916 Geneva, Switzerland
- Died: 23 May 1960 (aged 43–44) Geneva, Switzerland

Singles

Grand Slam singles results
- French Open: QF (1936)
- Wimbledon: 4R (1938)

Doubles

Grand Slam doubles results
- Wimbledon: 2R (1937)

Mixed doubles

Grand Slam mixed doubles results
- Wimbledon: 2R (1937)

Auguste Maneff Taneff (1916 – 23 May 1960), known as Boris Maneff, was a Swiss amateur tennis player in the 1930s and 1940s.

He was born in Geneva to a Bulgarian father, Kyril Manev Tanev (Bulgarian: Кирил Манев Танев, and French mother, Marie Purnot, from Metz. He also played high-level field hockey, ice hockey and football.

Maneff was a virtual unknown in the world of international tennis before entering the 1936 French Championships in Paris, where he reached the quarterfinals. He put up a challenge to defending champion Fred Perry, who finally defeated him in four sets. Maneff reached the fourth round in singles at the 1938 Wimbledon Championships where he was beaten by fourth-seeded Henner Henkel.
