= 1938 U.S. National Championships (tennis) =

- Date: August 22–27 (Note: Men's, women's and mixed doubles); September 8–24 (Note: Men's and women's singles)
- Edition: 58th
- Category: Grand Slam (ITF)
- Surface: Grass
- Location: Chestnut Hill, Massachusetts; Forest Hills, Queens, New York City; United States
- Venue: Longwood Cricket Club; West Side Tennis Club

Champions

Men's singles
- (United States) Don Budge

Women's singles
- (United States) Alice Marble

Men's doubles
- (United States) Don Budge / (United States) Gene Mako

Women's doubles
- (United States) Sarah Palfrey Cooke / (United States) Alice Marble

Mixed doubles
- (United States) Alice Marble / (United States) Don Budge
← 1937 ·	U.S. National Championships	· 1939 →

The 1938 U.S. National Championships (now known as the US Open) was a tennis tournament that took place on the outdoor grass courts at the West Side Tennis Club, Forest Hills in New York City, New York. The tournament was scheduled to be held from Thursday September 8 until Saturday September 17 but was prolonged until Saturday September 24 due to poor weather caused by the 1938 New England hurricane. It was the 58th staging of the U.S. National Championships and the fourth Grand Slam tennis event of the year.

American Don Budge won the men's singles title and became the first tennis player to win the Grand Slam i.e. winning all four Major tennis tournaments (Australian Championships, French Championships, Wimbledon Championships, and U.S. National Championships) in a single calendar year. Budge also won the doubles and mixed doubles title.

== Finals ==
=== Men's singles ===
(United States) Don Budge defeated (United States) Gene Mako 6–3, 6–8, 6–2, 6–1

=== Women's singles ===
(United States) Alice Marble defeated (Australia) Nancye Wynne Bolton 6–0, 6–3

=== Men's doubles ===
(United States) Don Budge / (United States) Gene Mako defeated (Australia) Adrian Quist / (Australia) John Bromwich 6–3, 6–2, 6–1

=== Women's doubles ===
(United States) Sarah Palfrey Cooke / (United States) Alice Marble defeated (France) Simonne Mathieu / (Poland) Jadwiga Jędrzejowska 6–8, 6–4, 6–3

=== Mixed doubles ===
(United States) Alice Marble / (United States) Don Budge defeated (Australia) Thelma Coyne Long / (Australia) John Bromwich 6–1, 6–2

== Notes ==
Preceded by 1938 Wimbledon Championships	Grand Slams	Succeeded by 1939 Australian Championships
