= 1940 U.S. National Championships – Women's singles =

Women's singles
- 1940 U.S. National Championships

Final
- Champion: (United States) Alice Marble
- Runner-up: (United States) Helen Jacobs
- Score: 6–2, 6–3

Details
- Draw: 55
- Seeds: 7

Events
Singles	men	women
Doubles	men	women
← 1939 ·	U.S. National Championships	· 1941 →

First-seeded Alice Marble defeated second-seeded Helen Jacobs 6–2, 6–3 in the final to win the women's singles tennis title at the 1940 U.S. National Championships. The tournament was played on outdoor grass courts and held from September 2, through September 7, 1940 at the West Side Tennis Club in Forest Hills, Queens, New York. Marble won the tournament without losing a set.

The draw consisted of 55 players of which seven were seeded.

== Seeds ==
The eight seeded U.S. players are listed below. Alice Marble is the champion; others show in brackets the round in which they were eliminated.

1. (United States) Alice Marble (champion)
2. (United States) Helen Jacobs (finalist)
3. (United States) Pauline Betz (quarterfinals)
4. (United States) Dorothy Bundy (quarterfinals)
5. (United States) Sarah Cooke (third round)
6. (United States) Helen Bernhard (quarterfinals)
7. (United States) Virginia Wolfenden (quarterfinals)

== Draw ==
=== Final eight ===
Quarterfinals
2	(United States) Helen Jacobs	3	6	6
7	(United States) Virginia Wolfenden	6	4	1
3	(United States) Pauline Betz	7	1	2
(United Kingdom) Mary Hardwick	5	6	6
1	(United States) Alice Marble	6	6
6	(United States) Helen Bernhard	2	3
4	(United States) Dorothy Bundy	6	4	3
(United Kingdom) Valerie Scott	2	6	6

Semifinals
2	(United States) Helen Jacobs	2	6	6
(United Kingdom) Mary Hardwick	6	1	4
1	(United States) Alice Marble	6	6
(United Kingdom) Valerie Scott	3	3

Finals
2	(United States) Helen Jacobs	2	3
1	(United States) Alice Marble	6	6
