= 1936 U.S. National Championships – Women's singles =

Women's singles
- 1936 U.S. National Championships

Final
- Champion: (United States) Alice Marble
- Runner-up: (United States) Helen Jacobs
- Score: 4–6, 6–3, 6–2

Details
- Draw: 64
- Seeds: 8

Events
Singles	men	women
Doubles	men	women
← 1935 ·	U.S. National Championships	· 1937 →

Third-seeded Alice Marble defeated first-seeded Helen Jacobs 4–6, 6–3, 6–2 in the final to win the women's singles tennis title at the 1936 U.S. National Championships. The tournament was played on outdoor grass courts and held from September 3, through September 12, 1936 at the West Side Tennis Club in Forest Hills, Queens, New York.

The draw consisted of 64 players of which eight were seeded.

== Seeds ==
The eight seeded U.S. players are listed below. Alice Marble is the champion; others show in brackets the round in which they were eliminated.

1. (United States) Helen Jacobs (finalist)
2. (United States) Sarah Fabyan (first round)
3. (United States) Alice Marble (champion)
4. (United States) Carolin Babcock (quarterfinals)
5. (United States) Marjorie Van Ryn (third round)
6. (United States) Gracyn Wheeler (quarterfinals)
7. (United States) Helen Pedersen (semifinals)
8. (United States) Mary Greef Harris (third round)

== Draw ==
=== Final eight ===
Quarterfinals
1	(United States) Helen Jacobs	6	6
(United States) Gussie Raegener	0	1
4	(United States) Carolin Babcock	5	6	4
(United Kingdom) Kay Stammers	7	3	6
(United States) Dorothy Bundy	3	6	4
7	(United States) Helen Pedersen	6	4	6
3	(United States) Alice Marble	6	11
6	(United States) Gracyn Wheeler	2	9

Semifinals
1	(United States) Helen Jacobs	6	6
(United Kingdom) Kay Stammers	4	3
7	(United States) Helen Pedersen	0	1
3	(United States) Alice Marble	6	6

Finals
1	(United States) Helen Jacobs	6	3	2
3	(United States) Alice Marble	4	6	6

Preceded by 1936 Wimbledon Championships – Women's singles	Grand Slam women's singles	Succeeded by 1937 Australian Championships – Women's singles
