= Claude Lister =

British tennis player (1911–1988)

- Full name: Claude Frederick Owen Lister
- Country (sports): United Kingdom
- Born: 13 October 1911
- Died: 19 April 1988 (aged 76)
- Height: 6 ft 2 in (1.88 m)

Singles

Grand Slam singles results
- Wimbledon: 3R (1947, 1949)

Doubles

Grand Slam doubles results
- Wimbledon: 2R (1938, 1939, 1948, 1950, 1951, 1953)

Grand Slam mixed doubles results
- Wimbledon: 4R (1955)

Claude Frederick Owen Lister (13 October 1911 – 19 April 1988) was a British tennis player and coach.

An Essex county player, Lister featured regularly at the Wimbledon Championships through the 1930s to 1950s. He twice reached the third round in singles, including in 1949 when he was the last Briton remaining in the draw.

Lister, known for his strong serve, won the Surrey singles championships in Surbiton in 1947.

In 1958 he began a long stint as non-playing captain of the South Africa Davis Cup team. He was captain of South Africa's only Davis Cup title winning side in 1974, secured after India refused to compete in the final due to the apartheid policy. This made South Africa the first Davis Cup champions outside the four grand slam hosting nations.

Lister was married to tennis player Thelma Jarvis. They had a son born in 1949.
