= Gracyn Wheeler Kelleher =

American tennis player

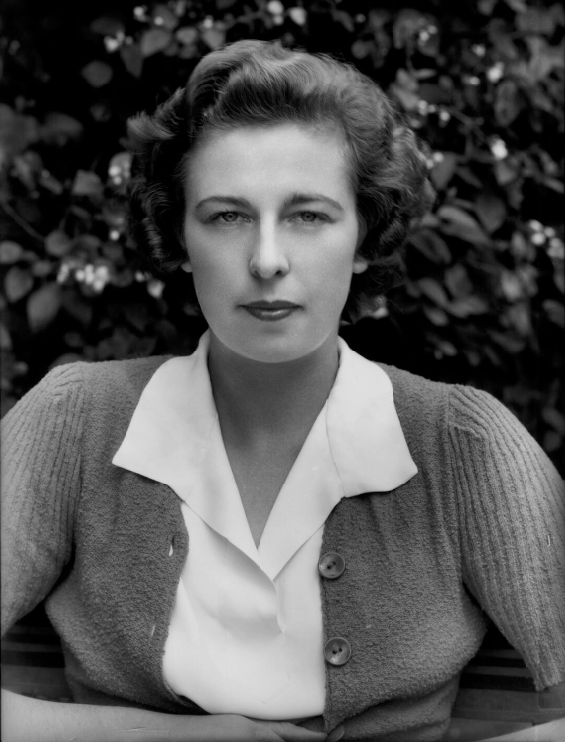
- Wheeler Kelleher in 1938
- Full name: Gracyn Weymouth Wheeler Kelleher
- Country (sports): United States
- Born: July 2, 1914
- Died: October 11, 1980 (aged 66); Los Angeles, California, U.S.
- Turned pro: 1930 (amateur)
- Retired: 1961

Singles
- Career record: 404-155 (72.3%)
- Career titles: 48
- Highest ranking: 4 (USA)

Grand Slam singles results
- French Open: 2R (1939)
- Wimbledon: 3R (1939)

Doubles

Grand Slam doubles results
- French Open: QF (1939)
- Wimbledon: QF (1939)

Grand Slam mixed doubles results
- Wimbledon: 2R (1955)

Gracyn Wheeler Kelleher (July 2, 1914 – October 11, 1980) was an American tennis player. She was active on ILTF World Circuit from 1930 to 1961 where she contested 85 career singles finals and won 48 titles.

Her best season came in 1939 when she won 11 singles titles and finished that year as title leader on the ILTF World Circuit

Wheeler also played for the U.S. Wightman Cup team and was ranked as high as No. 4 in the United States during her career.

== Career ==
She played her first senior tournament in May 1930 at the Southern California Championships. In September that year she reached her first final at the Santa Monica Championships where she lost to Violet Doeg. In December 1931 she won her first singles title at the Los Angeles Midwinter Championships against Elizabeth Deike.

Wheeler won the singles title at the Pacific Southwest Championships in September 1936 after a win in the final against Alice Marble who had become U.S. National champion earlier that month. At the Tri-State Tennis Tournament in Cincinnati, Wheeler won the singles title in 1934 and was a singles finalist in 1940. At the Canadian National tournament, she won the singles title in 1933.

She and Helen Bernard reached the finals of the 1940 National Clay Court Doubles Championships, then lost to Alice Marble and Mary Arnold at a final played in Cincinnati. She won the doubles title at the U.S. Women's Indoor Championships in 1940 partnering Norma Taubele Barber.

She won the Oregon state singles and doubles titles in 1932 and the singles title in 1933. She was a quarterfinalist at the 1936 U.S. Nationals and won the U.S. Girls 18s doubles title in 1932.

In 1939 at the Gallia Club de Cannes Championship in Cannes, France, Wheeler was seeded No. 1, ahead of French player, future International Tennis Hall of Fame inductee Simonne Mathieu. According to the February 9, 1939, edition of the Oakland Tribune, Mathieu protested, telling officials "Am I not the greatest player in all of France? If I am not seeded No. 1, I will quit the tournament." Wheeler quickly gave up the No. 1 seed in deference to Mathieu, and took her place as the No. 2 seed, but defeated her in three sets

Wheeler participated in the Wimbledon Championships in 1938, 1939 and 1955. She reached the third round in singles and the quarterfinals in doubles, both in 1939. With her husband, she took part in the mixed doubles in 1955 and lost in the second round after a bye in the first.

In August 1939, it was reported that she would marry German tennis player Henner Henkel in October that year. On August 15, 1940, she married Robert J. Kelleher, an American district court judge in Los Angeles, former U.S. Davis Cup captain, president of the United States Tennis Association, and member of the International Tennis Hall of Fame. She won her final singles title in July 1947 at Vancouver where she beat Eleanor Young Connelly. She reached here last final in March 1950 at the La Jolla Summer Championships in San Diego where she lost to Dodo Cheyne. She played her final event in May 1961 at the Northern California Championships in Sacramento.

She has been inducted into the Southern California Tennis Association Senior Hall of Fame.
