= Anita Lizana =

Chilean tennis player (1915–1994)

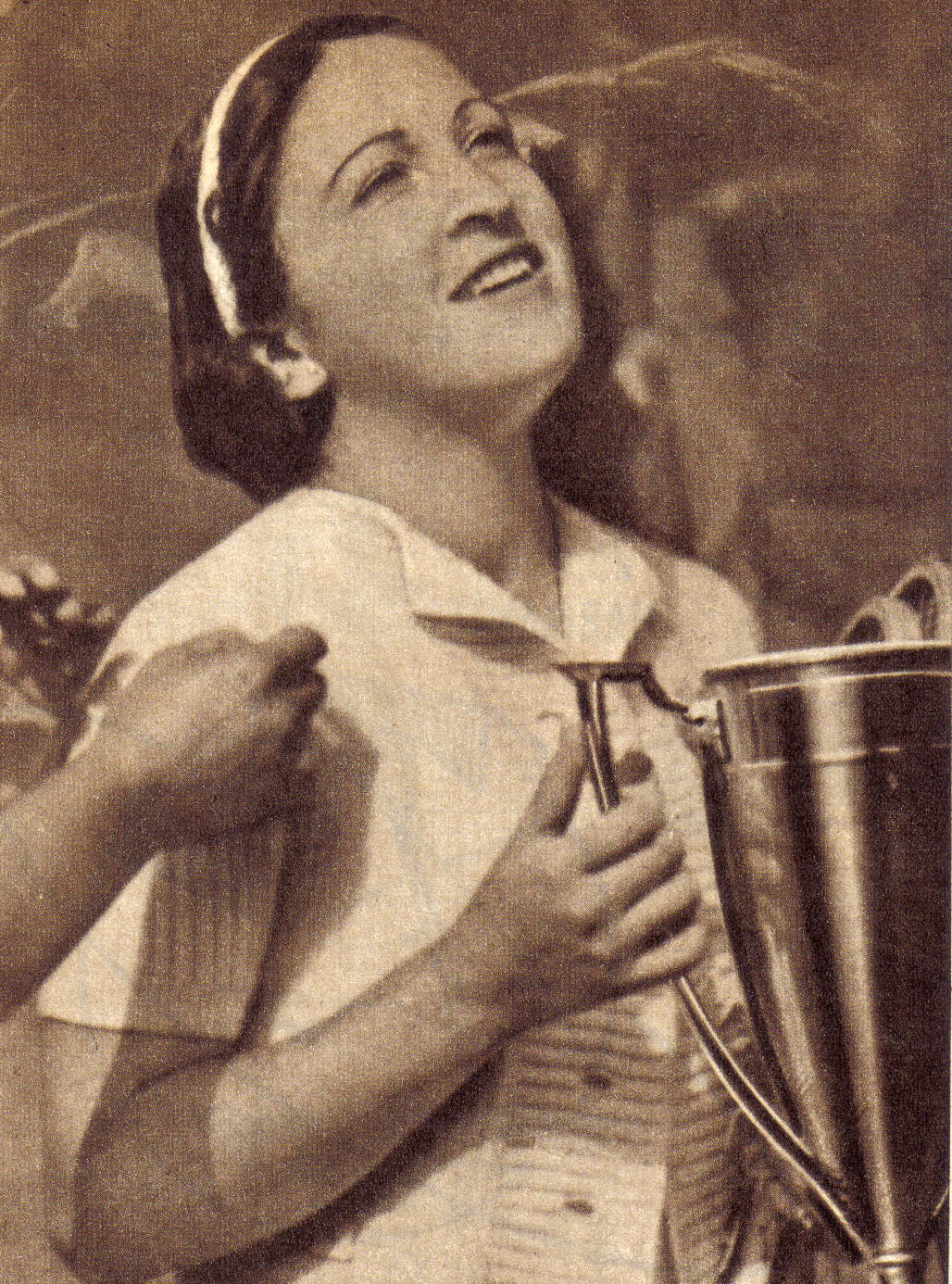
- Full name: Anita Lizana de Ellis
- Country (sports): Chile
- Born: 19 November 1915 Santiago, Chile
- Died: 21 August 1994 (aged 78) Sutton, London, England
- Height: 1.59 m (5 ft 2 1/2 in)
- Plays: Right-handed

Singles
- Career record: 275–35 (88.7%)
- Career titles: 51
- Highest ranking: No. 1 (1937)

Grand Slam singles results
- French Open: 3R (1935)
- Wimbledon: QF (1936, 1937)
- US Open: W (1937)

Grand Slam doubles results
- French Open: 1R (1935)
- Wimbledon: QF (1938, 1947)

Grand Slam mixed doubles results
- Wimbledon: 3R (1939)

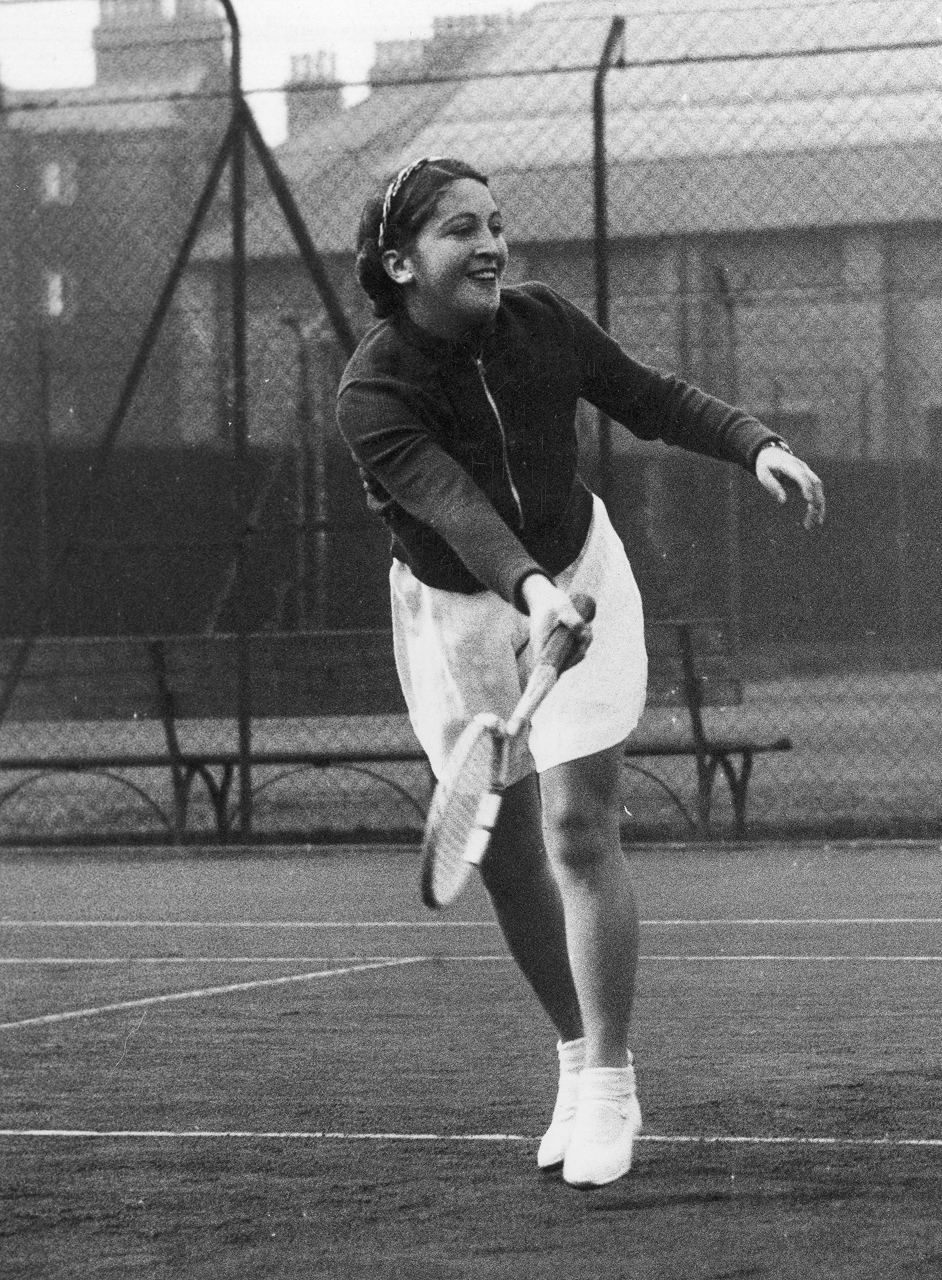
Lizana in 1938 at the Queen's Club

Anita Lizana de Ellis (19 November 1915 – 21 August 1994) was a world No. 1 tennis player from Chile. She was the first Latin American, and first Hispanic person, to be ranked World Number 1 tennis player. Also, Lizana was the first Latin American to win a Grand Slam singles championship. She won the U.S. Championships singles title in 1937, defeating Jadwiga Jędrzejowska in the final in straight sets.

== Career ==
In the singles event of the 1937 U.S. Championships Lizana defeated three seeded players without losing a set to reach the final where she beat Jadwiga Jędrzejowska, also in straight sets. At the Wimbledon Championships she reached the singles quarterfinals in 1936 and 1937. In 1936 she lost to second-seeded and eventual champion Helen Jacobs while in 1937 sixth-seeded Simonne Mathieu proved too strong.

She won the Scottish Championships four times (1935–37, 46).

In 1936 Lizana won the singles titles at the British Covered Court Championships, played on wood courts at the Queen's Club in London, and the South of England Championships in Eastbourne where she defeated Dorothy Round in the final in straight sets. That year she was a runner-up to Kay Stammers at the British Hard Court Championships but in 1937 she won the title after a victory in the final against Peggy Scriven. The same year she won the Riviera Championships at Menton, France, the Pacific Coast Championships in Berkeley, California, and the British Hard Court Championships in Bournemouth.

According to A. Wallis Myers of The Daily Telegraph and the Daily Mail, she was ranked in the world top ten in 1936 and 1937 reaching a career high of world No. 1 in 1937. (Note: Since Lizana, the only other Latin American to be ranked world No. 1 in ladies tennis has been Maria Bueno of Brazil.)

After her marriage she limited her playing to some British tournaments. World War II and the birth of her children effectively ended her career as a top player. She did play some tournaments in 1946 and won the Scottish Championships in Edinburgh in July and the Scottish Hard Court Championships held at St Andrews in August. At Wimbledon she reached second round in the singles event.

== Personal life ==
In Santiago she lived in a house within the boundaries of the Quinta Normal Park. In July 1938, at the Brompton Oratory in London, she married Scottish coal merchant and tennis player Ronald Taylor Ellis (d. 1978) and the couple settled in Dundee. They had three daughters. Lizana died of stomach cancer on 21 August 1994.

In 2015 the main court of the national tennis stadium in Santiago was named "Court Central Anita Lizana" in her honor.

== Grand Slam finals ==
=== Singles: 1 (1 title) ===
Result	Year	Championship	Surface	Opponent	Score
Win	1937	U.S. Championships	Grass	(Poland) Jadwiga Jędrzejowska	6–4, 6–2

== Grand Slam singles tournament timeline ==
Key
W	F	SF	QF	#R	RR	Q#	DNQ	A	NH

(W) winner; (F) finalist; (SF) semifinalist; (QF) quarterfinalist; (#R) rounds 4, 3, 2, 1; (RR) round-robin stage; (Q#) qualification round; (DNQ) did not qualify; (A) absent; (NH) not held; (SR) strike rate (events won / competed); (W–L) win–loss record.

Tournament	1935	1936	1937	1938	1939	1940	1941 - 1944	1945	1946^{1}	1947^{1}	Career SR
Australian Championships	A	A	A	A	A	A	NH	NH	A	A	0 / 0
French Championships	3R	A	A	A	A	NH	R	A	A	A	0 / 1
Wimbledon	3R	QF	QF	2R	2R	NH	NH	NH	A	2R	0 / 6
U.S. Championships	A	A	W	A	A	A	A	A	A	A	1 / 1
SR	0 / 2	0 / 1	1 / 2	0 / 1	0 / 1	0 / 0	0 / 0	0 / 0	0 / 0	0 / 1	1 / 8

R = restricted to French nationals and held under German occupation.

^{1}In 1946 and 1947, the French Championships were held after Wimbledon.

== See also ==
- Performance timelines for all female tennis players since 1978 who reached at least one Grand Slam final
- World number one women tennis players
