= Nina Brown (tennis) =

British–American tennis player (1915–2018)

- Full name: Nina Brown Hamilton
- Country (sports): Great Britain
- Born: January 21, 1915 Uxbridge, England
- Died: April 22, 2018 (aged 103) Clayton, Missouri, U.S.
- Plays: Right-handed

Grand Slam singles results
- French Open: 1R (1939)
- Wimbledon: 3R (1939)
- US Open: 3R (1939, 1941)

Grand Slam doubles results
- French Open: QF (1939)
- Wimbledon: QF (1939)

Grand Slam mixed doubles results
- Wimbledon: F (1939)

Nina Brown Hamilton (January 21, 1915 – April 22, 2018) was a British–American tennis player.

== Biography ==
Brown was born in Uxbridge and grew up on the outskirts of London, attending Notting Hill and Ealing High School. Her often doubles partner Rita Jarvis was one of her classmates. In 1939, she was a mixed doubles finalist at the Wimbledon Championships (with Frank Wilde) and played doubles on the Wightman Cup team. World War II broke out while she was in the United States for the Wightman Cup and she became stranded in her host country. She ended up taking a hostess job at a winter resort in Arizona, where she met Yale graduate Ray Hamilton, whom she married in 1941. Raising four children, Brown spent the remainder of her life in St Louis, Missouri, and lived to the age of 103.

== Grand Slam finals ==
=== Mixed doubles (1 runner-up) ===
Result	Year	Championship	Surface	Partner	Opponents	Score
Loss	1939	Wimbledon	Grass	(United Kingdom) Frank Wilde	(United States) Bobby Riggs (United States) Alice Marble	7–9, 1–6
