= 1938 Wimbledon Championships =

- Date: 20 June – 2 July
- Edition: 58th
- Category: Grand Slam
- Surface: Grass
- Location: Church Road; SW19, Wimbledon, London, United Kingdom
- Venue: All England Lawn Tennis and Croquet Club

Champions

Men's singles
- (United States) Don Budge

Women's singles
- (United States) Helen Moody

Men's doubles
- (United States) Don Budge / (United States) Gene Mako

Women's doubles
- (United States) Sarah Fabyan / (United States) Alice Marble

Mixed doubles
- (United States) Don Budge / (United States) Alice Marble
- Wimbledon Championships

The 1938 Wimbledon Championships took place on the outdoor grass courts at the All England Lawn Tennis and Croquet Club in Wimbledon, London, United Kingdom. The tournament was held from Monday 20 June until Saturday 2 July 1938. It was the 58th staging of the Wimbledon Championships, and the third Grand Slam tennis event of 1938. Don Budge and Helen Moody won the singles title.

== Finals ==
=== Men's singles ===
(United States) Don Budge defeated (United Kingdom) Bunny Austin, 6–1, 6–0, 6–3

=== Women's singles ===
(United States) Helen Moody defeated (United States) Helen Jacobs, 6–4, 6–0

=== Men's doubles ===
(United States) Don Budge / (United States) Gene Mako defeated (Germany) Henner Henkel / (Germany) Georg von Metaxa, 6–4, 3–6, 6–3, 8–6

=== Women's doubles ===
(United States) Sarah Fabyan / (United States) Alice Marble defeated (France) Simonne Mathieu / (United Kingdom) Billie Yorke, 6–2, 6–3

=== Mixed doubles ===
(United States) Don Budge / (United States) Alice Marble defeated (Germany) Henner Henkel / (United States) Sarah Fabyan, 6–1, 6–4

Preceded by 1938 French Championships	Grand Slams	Succeeded by 1938 U.S. National Championships
