= Alice Marble =

American tennis player (1913–1990)

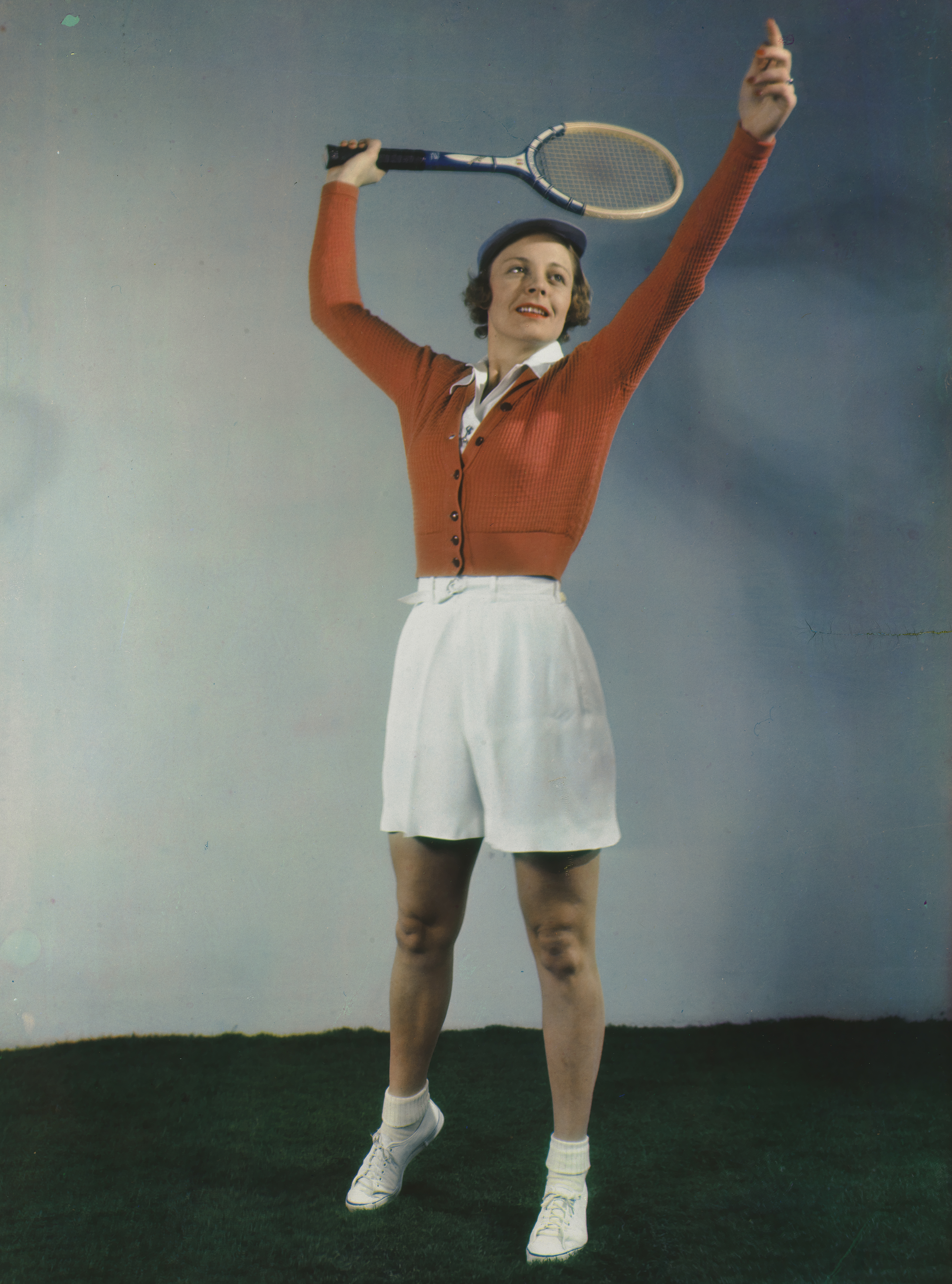
- Marble in 1939
- Full name: Alice Irene Marble
- Country (sports): United States
- Born: September 28, 1913 Beckwourth, California, U.S.
- Died: December 13, 1990 (aged 77) Palm Springs, California, U.S.
- Turned pro: 1930 (amateur)
- Retired: 1947
- Plays: right handed
- Int. Tennis HoF: 1964 (member page)

Singles
- Career record: 330-37 (89.9%)
- Career titles: 45
- Highest ranking: No. 1 (1939)

Grand Slam singles results
- French Open: 2R (1934)
- Wimbledon: W (1939)
- US Open: W (1936, 1938, 1939, 1940)

Grand Slam doubles results
- Wimbledon: W (1938, 1939)
- US Open: W (1937, 1938, 1939, 1940)

Mixed doubles
- Career record: Incomplete

Grand Slam mixed doubles results
- Wimbledon: W (1937, 1938, 1939)
- US Open: W (1936, 1938, 1939, 1940)

Team competitions
- Wightman Cup: W (1933, 1937, 1938, 1939)

Alice Irene Marble (September 28, 1913 – December 13, 1990) was an American tennis player who won 18 Grand Slam championships between 1936 and 1940: five in singles, six in women's doubles, and seven in mixed doubles. She was ranked world No. 1 in 1939.

== Early life ==
Born in the small town of Beckwourth, California, Marble moved with her family at the age of five to San Francisco. A tomboy, she played seven sports at San Francisco Polytechnic High School, including basketball and baseball, but her brother persuaded her to try tennis. She quickly mastered the game, playing in Golden Gate Park, and by age 15, won several California junior tournaments.

== Tennis career ==
At the U.S. Championships, Marble won the singles title in 1936 and from 1938 to 1940, the women's doubles title with Sarah Palfrey Cooke from 1937 to 1940, and the mixed doubles title with Gene Mako in 1936, Don Budge in 1938, Harry Hopman in 1939, and Bobby Riggs in 1940.

At Wimbledon, Marble won the singles title in 1939; the women's doubles title with Cooke in 1938 and 1939 and the mixed doubles title with Budge in 1937 and 1938 as well as the mixed doubles title with Riggs in 1939.

In Wightman Cup team competition, Marble lost only one singles and one doubles match in the years she competed (1933, 1937–39).

According to A. Wallis Myers and John Olliff of The Daily Telegraph and the Daily Mail, Marble was ranked in the world top 10 from 1936 to 1939 (no rankings issued 1940–1945), reaching a career high in those rankings of world No. 1 in 1939. Marble was included in the year-end top ten rankings issued by the United States Lawn Tennis Association in 1932–33 and 1936–40. She was the top-ranked U.S. player from 1936 to 1940.

Marble was the Associated Press Athlete of the Year in 1939 and 1940.

After capping a stellar amateur career in 1940, Marble turned professional and earned more than $100,000, travelling around playing exhibition tournaments.

== Retirement ==
For a brief time after retirement, she worked on the editorial advisory board of DC Comics and was credited as an associate editor on Wonder Woman. She created the "Wonder Women of History" feature for the comics, which told the stories of prominent women of history in comic form.

In her second autobiography Courting Danger (released after her death in 1990), Marble mentions that, back in the 1940s, she had married Joe Crowley around World War II, a pilot, who was killed in action over Germany. Only days before his death, she miscarried their child following a car accident. After an attempt to kill herself, she recuperated, and in early 1945, agreed to spy for U.S. intelligence. Her mission involved renewing contact with a former lover, a Swiss banker, and obtaining Nazi financial data. The operation ended when a Nazi agent shot her in the back after chasing her while she was trying to escape in a car, but she recovered. Few details of this operation have been corroborated by journalists and authors who tried to investigate this part of her life in the years from the time of her death to the present. No Swiss banker has been discovered, leading to suspicions that this man of mystery might have been a Nazi, someone who Marble may have been trying to avoid having had an association.

Marble greatly contributed to the desegregation of American tennis by writing an editorial in support of Althea Gibson for the July 1, 1950 issue of American Lawn Tennis Magazine. The article read "Miss Gibson is over a very cunningly wrought barrel, and I can only hope to loosen a few of its staves with one lone opinion. If tennis is a game for ladies and gentlemen, it's also time we acted a little more like gentle-people and less like sanctimonious hypocrites...If Althea Gibson represents a challenge to the present crop of women players, it's only fair that they should meet that challenge on the courts." Marble said that, if Gibson were not given the opportunity to compete, "then there is an ineradicable mark against a game to which I have devoted most of my life, and I would be bitterly ashamed." Gibson, age 23, was given entry into the 1950 U.S. Championships, becoming the first African-American player, man or woman, to compete in a Grand Slam event.

In 1964, Marble was inducted into the International Tennis Hall of Fame. She settled in Palm Desert, California, where she taught tennis until her death. One of her students was Billie Jean King.

Weakened by pernicious anaemia, Marble died at a hospital in Palm Springs, California.

== Legacy ==
Alice Marble Tennis Courts, providing a panoramic view of the Pacific Ocean and the Golden Gate bridge from the top of Russian Hill in San Francisco, is named in her honor.

== Grand Slam finals ==
=== Singles (5 titles) ===
Result	Year	Championship	Surface	Opponent	Score
Win	1936	U.S. Championships	Grass	(United States) Helen Jacobs	4–6, 6–3, 6–2
Win	1938	U.S. Championships	Grass	(Australia) Nancye Wynne	6–0, 6–3
Win	1939	Wimbledon	Grass	(United Kingdom) Kay Stammers	6–2, 6–0
Win	1939	U.S. Championships	Grass	(United States) Helen Jacobs	6–0, 8–10, 6–4
Win	1940	U.S. Championships	Grass	(United States) Helen Jacobs	6–2, 6–3

=== Doubles (6 titles) ===
Result	Year	Championship	Surface	Partner	Opponents	Score
Win	1937	U.S. National Championships	Grass	(United States) Sarah Fabyan	(United States) Marjorie Gladman Van Ryn (United States) Carolin Babcock	7–5, 6–4
Win	1938	Wimbledon	Grass	(United States) Sarah Fabyan	(France) Simonne Mathieu (United Kingdom) Billie Yorke	6–2, 6–3
Win	1938	U.S. National Championships	Grass	(United States) Sarah Fabyan	(France) Simonne Mathieu (Poland) Jadwiga Jędrzejowska	6–8, 6–4, 6–3
Win	1939	Wimbledon	Grass	(United States) Sarah Fabyan	(United States) Helen Jacobs (United Kingdom) Billie Yorke	6–1, 6–0
Win	1939	U.S. National Championships	Grass	(United States) Sarah Fabyan	(United Kingdom) Kay Stammers (United Kingdom) Freda Hammersley	7–5, 8–6
Win	1940	U.S. National Championships	Grass	(United States) Sarah Fabyan	(United States) Dorothy Bundy (United States) Marjorie Gladman Van Ryn	6–4, 6–3

=== Mixed doubles (7 titles) ===
Result	Year	Championship	Surface	Partner	Opponents	Score
Win	1936	U.S. National Championships	Grass	(United States) Gene Mako	(United States) Sarah Fabyan (United States) Don Budge	6–3, 6–2
Win	1937	Wimbledon	Grass	(United States) Don Budge	(France) Simonne Mathieu (France) Yvon Petra	6–4, 6–1
Win	1938	Wimbledon	Grass	(United States) Don Budge	(United States) Sarah Fabyan (Germany) Henner Henkel	6–1, 6–4
Win	1938	U.S. National Championships	Grass	(United States) Gene Mako	(Australia) Thelma Coyne Long (Australia) John Bromwich	6–1, 6–2
Win	1939	Wimbledon	Grass	(United States) Bobby Riggs	(United Kingdom) Frank Wilde (United Kingdom) Nina Brown	9–7, 6–1
Win	1939	U.S. National Championships	Grass	(Australia) Harry Hopman	(United States) Sarah Fabyan (United States) Elwood Cooke	9–7, 6–1
Win	1940	U.S. National Championships	Grass	(United States) Bobby Riggs	(United States) Dorothy Bundy (United States) Jack Kramer	9–7, 6–1

== Grand Slam singles tournament timeline ==
Key
W	F	SF	QF	#R	RR	Q#	DNQ	A	NH

(W) winner; (F) finalist; (SF) semifinalist; (QF) quarterfinalist; (#R) rounds 4, 3, 2, 1; (RR) round-robin stage; (Q#) qualification round; (DNQ) did not qualify; (A) absent; (NH) not held; (SR) strike rate (events won / competed); (W–L) win–loss record.

Tournament	1931	1932	1933	1934	1935	1936	1937	1938	1939	1940	Career SR
Australia	A	A	A	A	A	A	A	A	A	A	0 / 0
France	A	A	A	2R	A	A	A	A	A	NH	0 / 1
Wimbledon	A	A	A	A	A	A	SF	SF	W	NH	1 / 3
United States	1R	3R	QF	A	A	W	QF	W	W	W	4 / 8
SR	0 / 1	0 / 1	0 / 1	0 / 1	0 / 0	1 / 1	0 / 2	1 / 2	2 / 2	1 / 1	5 / 12

== In popular culture ==
=== Books ===
Ace, Marvel, Spy by Jenni L. Walsh is the fictionalized account of Alice Marble's tennis career and efforts during World War II. Published in 2025 by Harper Muse (HarperCollins Publishers).

== See also ==
- Performance timelines for all female tennis players who reached at least one Grand Slam final

== General and cited references ==
- Leary, Kevin (December 14, 1990). "Ex-Tennis Champ Alice Marble". San Francisco Chronicle, p. B7.
- Marble, Alice, with Dale Leatherman (1991). Courting Danger. New York: St. Martin's Press.
- Rogers, Thomas (December 14, 1990). "Alice Marble, 77, Top U.S. Tennis Star of 1930s" (subscription required). The New York Times, p. D23.
- Weintraub, Robert (2020). The Devine Miss Marble. New York: Dutton. ISBN 9781524745363. OCLC 1132238984.
- Yardley, Jonathan (June 12, 1991). "Sizzling Serves". The Washington Post. p. F2.
