= Rita Jarvis =

British tennis player

- Full name: Rita Anderson Jarvis
- Country (sports): United Kingdom; United States

Singles

Grand Slam singles results
- French Open: 3R (1950)
- Wimbledon: 4R (1951)
- US Open: 3R (1940)

Doubles

Grand Slam doubles results
- French Open: QF (1939, 1950)
- Wimbledon: QF (1939, 1950)

Grand Slam mixed doubles results
- Wimbledon: QF (1956)

Rita Anderson Jarvis (1916–1982) was a British tennis player.

Jarvis, who attended Notting Hill and Ealing High School in Middlesex, made her first Wimbledon main draw appearance in 1936. She reached the singles fourth round of the 1951 Wimbledon Championships, losing to Jean Walker-Smith. As a doubles player she made quarter-finals at the French Championships and Wimbledon. During her first marriage, to Los Angeles tennis player Owen Anderson, she competed on tour as an American. She was divorced from Anderson in March 1953 and two months later married Czechoslovak-born Egyptian tennis player Jaroslav Drobný.
