= Mary Hardwick =

British tennis player

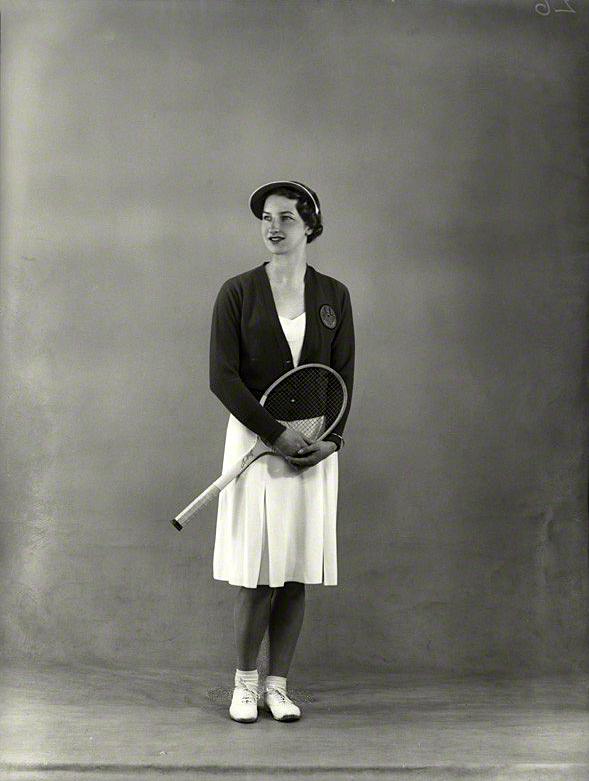
- Full name: Ruth Mary Hardwick Hare
- Country (sports): United Kingdom
- Born: 8 September 1913; London, England
- Died: 18 December 2001 (aged 88)
- Turned pro: 1931 (amateur circuit)
- Retired: 1953

Singles
- Career record: 294-146 (66.8%)
- Career titles: 21
- Highest ranking: No. 8 (1939)

Grand Slam singles results
- French Open: QF (1939)
- Wimbledon: QF (1939)
- US Open: SF (1940)

Doubles

Grand Slam doubles results
- Wimbledon: 3R (1936–39)
- US Open: SF (1940)

Grand Slam mixed doubles results
- Wimbledon: QF (1934)

Mary Hardwick (8 September 1913 – 18 December 2001) was a British female tennis player who was active during the 1930s and the 1940s.

She was born in London and attended Putney High School and also received education in Paris. She decided to become a tennis player after seeing Henri Cochet play at Wimbledon.

Between 1931 and 1939 she participated in eight Wimbledon Championships and in seven editions she competed in the singles, doubles and mixed doubles events. Her best result in the singles event was reaching the quarterfinal in 1939 in which she lost to Hilde Sperling in straight sets. In the 1934 mixed doubles event she reached the quarterfinal partnering Iwao Aoki. Her best singles performance at a Grand Slam tournament was reaching the semifinal of the 1940 U.S. Championships in which she was defeated in three sets by Helen Jacobs.

In July 1931 Hardwick was the runner-up at the singles event of the Canadian Championships after she had to default in the final against compatriot Evelyn Dearman. With Dearman she also won the doubles title. In 1933 she became the Welsh singles champion in Newport. Hardwick won three titles at the Scandinavian Indoor Championships as well as the French indoor title. During the autumn and winter of 1934 she received coaching from Dan Maskell. In 1934 and 1936 she was a finalist at the British Covered Court Championships played at the Queen's Club. At the same location in 1935 she won the singles, doubles and mixed doubles events of the London Covered Court Championships.

In 1936, 1937 and 1938 Hardwick was part of the British Wightman Cup team as a singles player. All three editions were won by the United States and Hardwick was not able to win any of her matches although she took a set against both Helen Jacobs and Alice Marble in the 1937 edition. She defeated Kay Stammers in the final to win the singles title at the Surrey Hard Court Championships, played on clay courts, in April 1939 and that year she achieved her highest world ranking of No. 8. With Margaret Osborne she won the 1940 doubles title at the Pacific Coast Championships in Berkeley.

In November 1940 Hardwick turned professional, in part to improve her family's financial situation during the war, and she made her debut on 7 January 1941 against Alice Marble in front of a crowd of almost 12,000 at the Madison Square Garden. The match, which she lost in two close sets, was the first on a transcontinental tour in the United States with a professional group that also included Don Budge and Bill Tilden. Marble decisively won the series again Hardwick with 17–3 after having led 17–1. At the end of the 1940 tour the score was 58–3 in favour of Marble. (Note: According to American National Biography's article on Alice Marble the final score was 72–3 while Marble herself in a 1985 newspaper interview stated "We played 72 matches and I lost three. Poor Mary.") In the mixed doubles matches Hardwick would usually team-up with Budge against Marble and Tilden, the latter team winning narrowly by 25–21.

In January 1943 she married Charles Hare, a British tennis player and referee whom she met in the United States. After her active tennis career she stayed involved with the sport and was a regular contributor to the Lawn Tennis and Badminton and World Tennis magazines. She played an important role in the founding of the Federation Cup when she convinced the International Lawn Tennis Federation (ILTF) in 1962 that such an event would have wide support. Her brother Derek Hardwick was the chairman of the British Lawn Tennis Association (LTA) and president of the International Tennis Federation.
