= Billie Yorke =

British tennis player

- Full name: Adeline Maud Yorke
- Country (sports): United Kingdom
- Born: 19 December 1910; Rawalpindi, British India
- Died: 9 December 2000 (aged 89)

Singles

Grand Slam singles results
- French Open: 3R (1935)
- Wimbledon: 4R (1934)

Doubles

Grand Slam doubles results
- French Open: W (1936, 1937, 1938)
- Wimbledon: W (1937)

Grand Slam mixed doubles results
- French Open: W (1936)
- Wimbledon: 4R (1933, 1934, 1938)

Adeline 'Billie' Yorke (19 December 1910 – 9 December 2000) was a British tennis player of the 1930s who achieved her best results as a doubles specialist.

At the French Open, she won the women's doubles three years running, along with Simonne Mathieu (1936–1938). With the same partner, she also won Wimbledon in 1937.

In 1935 Yorke won the singles title at the South of England Championships in Eastbourne after a three-sets victory in the final against Susan Noel. In 1938 she won the singles title at the Egyptian Championship in Cairo.

She also won the mixed doubles at the French Championships in 1936, along with Marcel Bernard.

== Grand Slam finals ==
=== Doubles: 7 (4 titles, 3 runners-up) ===
Result	Year	Championship	Surface	Partner	Opponents	Score
Loss	1933	Wimbledon	Grass	(United Kingdom) Freda James	(France) Simonne Mathieu (United States) Elizabeth Ryan	2–6, 11–9, 4–6
Win	1936	French Championships	Clay	(France) Simonne Mathieu	(United Kingdom) Susan Noel (Poland) Jadwiga Jędrzejowska	2–6, 6–4, 6–4
Win	1937	French Championships	Clay	(France) Simonne Mathieu	(United States) Dorothy Andrus (France) Sylvie Jung Henrotin	3–6, 6–2, 6–2
Win	1937	Wimbledon	Grass	(France) Simonne Mathieu	(United Kingdom) Phyllis Mudford King (United Kingdom) Elsie Goldsack Pittman	6–3, 6–3
Win	1938	French Championships	Clay	(France) Simonne Mathieu	(France) Arlette Halff (France) Nelly Adamson Landry	6–3, 6–3
Loss	1938	Wimbledon	Grass	(France) Simonne Mathieu	(United States) Sarah Palfrey Fabyan (United States) Alice Marble	2–6, 3–6
Loss	1939	Wimbledon	Grass	(United States) Helen Jacobs	(United States) Sarah Palfrey Fabyan (United States) Alice Marble	1–6, 0–6

=== Mixed doubles (1 title) ===
Result	Year	Championship	Surface	Partner	Opponents	Score
Win	1936	French Championships	Clay	(France) Marcel Bernard	(France) Sylvie Jung Henrotin (France) André Martin-Legeay	7–5, 6–8, 6–3
