= Hungarian International Championships =

Hungarian International Championships Magyar Nemzetközi Bajnokság

Defunct tennis tournament
- Tour: ILTF Circuit (1913–75)
- Founded: 1903; 122 years ago
- Abolished: 1975; 50 years ago
- Location: Budapest, Hungary
- Surface: Clay

The Hungarian International Championships or Magyar Nemzetközi Bajnokság was a combined men's and women's clay court tennis tournament first established in 1903.

== History ==
In 1894, the Hungarian National Tennis Championships were established. In 1903, the first Hungarian international competition was held in Budapest and then part of Austria-Hungary. In the beginning, the national tournament did accept foreign entries, but it did not carry the denomination of international championships. In 1921, the international event became a standalone championship in its own right. After 1924, the Hungarian International Championships served as a fully open international event, while only Hungarian players could possibly go for the national title. After World War II, the international tournament continued through till 1975 when it was discontinued.

== Finals ==
=== Men Singles ===
(Incomplete roll)

International Championships
Year	Champion	Runner-up	Score
1903	(United Kingdom) Major Ritchie	(Austria-Hungary) Rolf Kinzl	6–2, 6–3, 5–0, ret.
1921	(Hungary) Béla von Kehrling	(Hungary) Kamill Fittler	3–6, 6–0, 6–1, 6–0
1922	(Hungary) Béla Von Kehrling (2)	(Weimar Republic) Oscar Kreuzer	?
1923	(Hungary) Béla von Kehrling (3)	(Czechoslovakia) Friedrich Rohrer	6–2, 6–2, 6–1
1924	(Hungary) Béla Von Kehrling (4)	(Weimar Republic) Luis Maria Heyden	6–1, 6–3, 6–2
1925	(Hungary) Béla von Kehrling (5)	(Weimar Republic) Georg Demasius	6–3, 6–?, 4–6, 7–5
1926	(Hungary) Béla Von Kehrling (6)	(Weimar Republic) Kurt Bergmann	6–3, 6–3, retired
1927	(Hungary) Béla von Kehrling (7)	(France) Leonce J. Aslangul	2–6, 6–4, 6–4, 6–4
1929^{[f]}	(Hungary) Béla Von Kehrling (8)	(Czechoslovakia) Roderich Menzel	7–5, 4–6, 6–3 ret.
1930	(Czechoslovakia) Roderich Menzel	(Hungary) Béla Von Kehrling	4–6, 6–3, 6–4, 6–1,
1931	(Hungary) Béla Von Kehrling (9)	(Empire of Japan) Hyotaro Sato	6–3, 6–2, 5–7, 6–2
1932	(Hungary) Béla Von Kehrling (10)	(Hungary) Emil Gabrovitz^{[e]}	
1933	(Czechoslovakia) Roderich Menzel (2)	(Hungary) Emil Gábori	
1934	(Czechoslovakia) Ladislav Hecht	(Poland) Ignacy Tłoczyński	
1935	(Czechoslovakia) Ladislav Hecht (2)	(Hungary) Emil Gábori	6–3, 6–4, 7–5
1936	(Hungary) Ottó Szigeti	(Czechoslovakia) Vojtech Vodicka	6–4, 6–1, 6–4
1937	(Republic of China (1912–1949)) Kho Sin-Kie	(Austria) Adam Baworowski	7–5, 6–1, 4–6, 6–3
1938	(Hungary) Ottó Szigeti (2)	(France) Jean Lesueur	6–3, 4–6, 6–3, 1–6, 5–5 ret.
1939	(Hungary) Emil Gábori	(Germany) Gottfried von Cramm	
1942	(Hungary) József Asbóth	(Hungary) Emil Gábori	
1943	(Hungary) József Asbóth (2)	(Hungary) Ottó Szigeti	7–5, 6–2, 6–1
1944	(Hungary) József Asbóth (3)		
1945	(Independent State of Croatia) Dragutin Mitić	(Hungary) József Asbóth	3–10, 6–1, 6–3, 1–6, ret.
1946	(Hungary) József Asbóth (3)	(Hungary) Kalman Feher	6–1, 6–1, 6–4
1947	(Socialist Federal Republic of Yugoslavia) Dragutin Mitić (2)	(Hungary) József Asbóth	2–6, 6–4, 6–4
1948	(Hungary) József Asbóth (5)	(Czechoslovakia) Jan Krajcik	?
1949	(Poland) Władysław Skonecki	(Hungary) József Asbóth	1–6, 3–6, 7–5, 6–1, 9–7
1953	(Hungary) András Ádám-Stolpa	(Hungary) Zoltán Katona	6–1, 6–3, 6–2
1956	(Hungary) Antal Jancsó	(Hungary) Zoltán Katona	6–0, 0–6, 6–3, 6–1
1957	(Poland) Władysław Skonecki (2)	(Romania) Gheorghe Viziru	4–6, 7–5, 6–4, 6–2
1958	(Australia) Neale Fraser	(Hungary) István Gulyás	5–7, 6–4, 6–4, 4–6, 8–6
1959	(West Germany) Peter Scholl	(Hungary) István Gulyás	5–7, 1–6, 0–5, ret.
1960	(South Africa) Ian Vermaak	(Socialist Federal Republic of Yugoslavia) Boro Jovanović	7–5, 6–2, 6–2
1962	(Czechoslovakia) Jiří Javorský	(Hungary) István Gulyás	5–7, 6–4, 6–1, 6–1
1964	(Hungary) István Gulyás	(Denmark) Torben Ulrich	6–3, 6–3, 6–1
1966	(Hungary) István Gulyás (2)	(Hungary) Péter Szőke	6–2, 6–0, 6–2
1967	(Hungary) István Gulyás (3)	(Hungary) Péter Szőke	6–4, 7–5, 6–2
Open era
1968	(Romania) Ilie Năstase	(Chile) Patricio Rodríguez	8–6, 6–3, 6–3
1969	(Romania) Ilie Năstase (2)	(Hungary) István Gulyás	9–7, 6–4, 6–2
1970	(West Germany) Harald Elschenbroich	(Hungary) Géza Varga	4–6, 4–6, 6–2, 6–3, 6–1
1971	(Hungary) István Gulyás (4)	(Poland) Tadeusz Nowicki	8–6, 2–6, 1–6, 8–6, 7–5

=== Women's singles ===
(Incomplete roll)

International Championships
Year	Champion	Runner-up	Score
1903	(Austria-Hungary) Margit Madarász	(Austria-Hungary) Katalin Cséry	default.
1921	(Czechoslovakia) Margarete Janotta	(Austria) Mrs D. Mayer	6-0, 2-6 ret.
1922	(Hungary) Ilona Váradi	(Hungary) Médi Krencsey	6-2, 6-2
1923	(Czechoslovakia) Margarete Janotta (2)	(Hungary) Médi Krencsey	6-4, 6-3
1924	(Germany) Nelly Bamberger Neppach	(Hungary) Ilona Péteriné	8-6, 6-1
1925	(Germany) Ilse Friedleben	(Hungary) Ilona Péteriné	6-3, 6-1
1926	(Hungary) Ilona Péteriné (2)	(Hungary) Magda Baumgarten	6-1, 6-0
1927	(Germany) Nelly Neppach	(Hungary) Mrs Schréderné	6-0, 6-2
1928	(Germany) Irmgard Rost	(Germany) Nelly Gassmann Stephanus	6-2, 6-3
1929	(Germany) Hilde Krahwinkel	(Germany) Ellen Hoffmann	6-4, 6-1
1930	(Germany) Hilde Krahwinkel (2)	(Germany) Anne Peitz	6–4, 2–6, 8–6
1931	(Germany) Klara Hammer	(Poland) Jadwiga Jędrzejowska	3–6, 6–3, 9–7
1932	(Germany) Klara Hammer (2)	(Germany) Toni Schomburgk	6-4, 6-2
1933	(Germany) Hilde Krahwinkel (3)	(Germany) Cilly Aussem	6-2, 6-3
1934	(Germany) Toni Schomburgk	(Austria) Rosl Kraus	6-2, 6-2
1935	(Germany) Klara Hammer (3)	(Hungary) Lili Sárkány	4–6, 6–4, 6–3
1936	(Hungary) Márta Sass	(Hungary) Lili Sárkány	6–1, 3–6, 6–1
1937	(Germany) Anneliese Ullstein	(Hungary) Magda Baumgarten	6-1, 6-4
1938	(Germany) Marie-Louise Horn	(Kingdom of Yugoslavia) Hella Kovac	3–6, 7–5, retd.
1939	(Kingdom of Yugoslavia) Aliz Flórián	(Kingdom of Yugoslavia) Hella Kovac	2-6, 6-, 4–5, 15–40, retd.
1940	(Hungary) Suzy Körmöczy	(Hungary) Klára Somogyi	6-2, 6-2
1941	Women's event not held		
1942	(Kingdom of Yugoslavia) Aliz Flórián (2)	(Italy) Annelies Ullstein Bossi	w.o.
1943	(Kingdom of Yugoslavia) Aliz Flórián (3)	(Hungary) Ilona Jusits	6-1, 6-4
1944	(Kingdom of Yugoslavia) Aliz Flórián (3)	(Hungary) Zsuzsa Vad	6-2, 6-2
1945	Women's event not held		
1946	(Hungary) Márta Popp	(Hungary) Suzy Körmöczy	6–0, 5–7, 7–5
1947	(Austria) Hilda Walterová	(Hungary) Márta Popp	6-4, 8-6
1948	(Hungary) Erzsébet Bárd	(Hungary) Ilona Siposs Hidassyné	6-4, 6-2
1949	(Czechoslovakia) Olga Miskova	(Poland) Jadwiga Jędrzejowska	6–3, 4–6, 6–4
1950/1952	Women's event not held		
1953	(Hungary) Suzy Körmöczy (2)	(Hungary) Mária Jávori	1–6, 6–3, 6–2
1954/1955	Women's event not held		
1956	(Czechoslovakia) Vera Puzejova	(Hungary) Márta Popp	6-1, 6-3
1957	(Hungary) Suzy Körmöczy (3)	(France) Jacqueline Kermina	6-3, 6-2
1958	(Hungary) Suzy Körmöczy (4)	(Czechoslovakia) Vera Puzejova	6-3, 6-3
1959	(Hungary) Suzy Körmöczy (5)	(Hungary) Zsófia Broszmann	6-3, 6-2
1960	(Hungary) Suzy Körmöczy (6)	(United Kingdom) Ann Haydon	1–6, 8–6, 8–6
1961	Women's event not held		
1962	(Hungary) Suzy Körmöczy (7)	(Soviet Union) Anna Dmitrieva	6–1, 4–6, 6–4
1963	Women's event not held		
1964	(Czechoslovakia) Alena Palmeova	(China) Tsen Tsu Sun	4–6, 6–3, 6–1
1965	Women's event not held		
1966	(Poland) Miss Wieczorkowna	(East Germany) H. Magdeburg	6-2, 6-1
1967/1968	Women's event not held		
Open era
1969	(Australia) Helen Gourlay	(Soviet Union) Marina Chuvirina	6-4, 6-4
1970	Women's event not held		
1971	(Hungary) Judith Szörényi	(Hungary) Éva Szabó	6-2, 6-2

== Tournament records ==
Most men's singles titles. (Hungary) Béla Von Kehrling (10)
Most women's singles titles. (Hungary) Suzy Körmöczy (7)

== See also ==
- Category:National and multi-national tennis tournaments
