= 1937 French Championships – Women's singles =

Women's singles
- 1937 French Championships

Final
- Champion: (Denmark) Hilde Sperling
- Runner-up: (France) Simonne Mathieu
- Score: 6–2, 6–4

Details
- Seeds: 8

Events
Singles	men	women
Doubles	men	women
← 1936 ·	French Championships	· 1938 →

First-seeded Hilde Sperling defeated Simonne Mathieu 6–2, 6–4 in the final to win the women's singles tennis title at the 1937 French Championships.

== Seeds ==
The seeded players are listed below. Hilde Sperling is the champion; others show the round in which they were eliminated.

1. (Denmark) Hilde Sperling (champion)
2. (France) Simonne Mathieu (finalist)
3. (United States) Helen Jacobs (quarterfinals)
4. (United Kingdom) Margaret Scriven (quarterfinals)
5. (Spain) Lilly De La Valdène (semifinals)
6. (Poland) Jadwiga Jędrzejowska (semifinals)
7. (United Kingdom) Mary Hardwick (third round)
8. (France) Sylvie Henrotin (quarterfinals)

== Draw ==
=== Key ===
- Q = Qualifier
- WC = Wild card
- LL = Lucky loser
- r = Retired

=== Finals ===
Quarterfinals
1	(Denmark) Hilde Sperling	6	6
8	(France) Sylvie Henrotin	4	1
4	(United Kingdom) Margaret Scriven	2	6	2
5	(Spain) Lilly De La Valdène	6	1	6
6	(Poland) Jadwiga Jędrzejowska	6	6
3	(United States) Helen Jacobs	3	4
(Germany) Marie L. Horn	9	5
2	(France) Simonne Mathieu	11	7

Semifinals
1	(Denmark) Hilde Sperling	6	6
5	(Spain) Lilly De La Valdène	1	1
6	(Poland) Jadwiga Jędrzejowska	5	5
2	(France) Simonne Mathieu	7	7

Finals
1	(Denmark) Hilde Sperling	6	6
2	(France) Simonne Mathieu	2	4

=== Earlier rounds ===
==== Section 1 ====
First round

Second round
1	(Denmark) Sperling	6	6
(France) Varin	2	1
(France) Horner	7	6
Manzutto	5	3
8	(France) Henrotin	6	2	6
(United Kingdom) Bouverie	3	6	2
(United Kingdom) Noel	6	6
(France) Vives	2	2

Third round
1	(Denmark) Sperling	6	6
(France) Horner	1	2
8	(France) Henrotin	6	6
(United Kingdom) Noel	0	4

Quarterfinals
1	(Denmark) Sperling	6	6
8	(France) Henrotin	4	1

==== Section 2 ====
First round
(France) Iribarne	6	6
(France) Macready	0	3
(Sweden) Forsell	4	2
(France) De St. Ferreol	6	6
5	(Spain) L De La Valdène
Sobotkova
(France) Lebailly	6	6
(United Kingdom) Norman	2	1
(Netherlands) Couquerque	6	6
(France) Gallay	2	1
(France) Goldschmidt	6	6
(Sweden) Wittenström	0	1

Second round
4	(United Kingdom) Scriven
(France) Morel-Deville
(France) Iribarne	6	6
(France) De St. Ferreol	3	4
5	(Spain) L De La Valdène	6	6
(France) Lebailly	1	2
(Netherlands) Couquerque	6	4
(France) Goldschmidt	2	0	r

Third round
4	(United Kingdom) Scriven	7	3	6
(France) Iribarne	5	6	4
5	(Spain) L De La Valdène	6	6
(Netherlands) Couquerque	2	2

Quarterfinals
4	(United Kingdom) Scriven	6	1	6
5	(Spain) L De La Valdène	2	6	2

==== Section 3 ====
First round
(United Kingdom) Satterthwaite	2	3
(France) Pannetier	6	6
(France) Kleinadel
(United States) Andrus
(France) Goronitchenko	2	3
(Kingdom of Yugoslavia) Kovac	6	6
(France) Belliard	0	4
6	(Poland) Jędrzejowska	6	6
Planner	3	3
(France) Boegner	6	6
(France) Mellerio	3	6	1
(United States) Ingram	6	3	6
(France) Barbier	6	9
(Greece) Xydis	3	7

Second round
(France) Pannetier	6	3	6
(France) Kleinadel	3	6	4
(Kingdom of Yugoslavia) Kovac	3	0	r
6	(Poland) Jędrzejowska	6	4
(France) Boegner	6	3	6
(United States) Ingram	3	6	0
(France) Barbier	1	6	1
3	(United States) Jacobs	6	3	6

Third round
(France) Pannetier	2	3
6	(Poland) Jędrzejowska	6	6
(France) Boegner	3	5
3	(United States) Jacobs	6	7

Quarterfinals
6	(Poland) Jędrzejowska	6	6
3	(United States) Jacobs	3	4

==== Section 4 ====
First round

Second round
(France) Simon	6	5
(Germany) Horn	8	7
(France) Wyns-Speranza	1	3
7	(United Kingdom) Hardwick	6	6
(Austria) Wolf	6	0	0
(Netherlands) Terwindt	2	6	6
Weaver	2	0
2	(France) Mathieu	6	6

Third round
(Germany) Horn	6	6
7	(United Kingdom) Hardwick	4	3
(Netherlands) Terwindt	10	4	3
2	(France) Mathieu	8	6	6

Quarterfinals
(Germany) Horn	11	7
2	(France) Mathieu	9	5

Preceded by 1937 Australian Championships – Women's singles	Grand Slam women's singles	Succeeded by 1937 Wimbledon Championships – Women's singles
