= Budapest International Championships =

Budapest International Championships Budapesti Nemzetközi Bajnokság

Defunct tennis tournament
- Tour: ILTF Circuit
- Founded: 1903; 122 years ago
- Abolished: 1975; 50 years ago
- Location: Budapest, Hungary
- Surface: Clay / outdoor

The Budapest International Championships or Budapesti Nemzetközi Bajnokság also known as the Budapest International was a combined men's and women's clay court tennis tournament founded in 1903. It was first held in Budapest in what was then Austria-Hungary The tournament ran until 1975 then was discontinued.

== History ==
In 1894 the first Championships of Hungary were held. In 1903 the first international tournament the Budapest International were held in then the Austro-Hungarian Empire, the first men's singles title was won by Britain's Major Ritchie. The championships were usually held in late spring to early summer and ran with some breaks due to World War I and World War II until 1975.

== Finals ==
=== Men's Singles ===
(Incomplete roll)

Budapest International Championships
Year	Champion	Runner-up	Score
1903	(United Kingdom) Major Ritchie	(Austria-Hungary) Rolf Kinzl	6–2, 6–3, 6–0
1904	(United Kingdom) Major Ritchie (2)	(Germany) Ödön Schmid	6–0, 6–1, 6–0
1906	(Czechoslovakia) Ladislav Žemla	(Austria-Hungary) Frantisek Cistecky	6–2, 8–6, 6–4
1907	(New Zealand) Anthony Wilding	(Austria-Hungary) Kurt von Wessely	6–4, 6–3, 6–4
1908	(France) Max Decugis	(Canada) Robert Powell	6–2, 6–4, 6–2
1909	(Czechoslovakia) Ladislav Žemla (2)	(Czechoslovakia) Jaroslav Hainz	w.o.
1911	(Germany) Otto Mario Widmann	(Germany) Curt Brandis	?
1912	(Austria-Hungary) Jenő Zsigmondy	(Austria-Hungary) Alfred Janus	6-6, ret.
1915/1921	men's event not held due to World War I and after		
1922	(Hungary) Béla von Kehrling	(Hungary) Kamill Fittler	6–2, 8–6, 6–0
1923	(Hungary) Béla von Kehrling (2)	(Weimar Republic) Friedrich Wilhelm Rahe	7–5, 6–2, 7–5
1929	(Hungary) Béla von Kehrling (3)	(Hungary) Roland Jacobi	6–1, 6–1, 6–3
1930	(Hungary) Béla von Kehrling (4)	(Czechoslovakia) Jiri Novotny	6–3, 6–1, 7–5
1931	(Hungary) Béla von Kehrling (5)	(Hungary) Emil Gábori	6–0, 6–2, 6–1
1932	(Hungary) Emil Gábori	(Poland) Adam Baworowski	6–2, 7–5, 6–0
1935	(Hungary) Emil Gábori (2)	(Hungary) Lehel Bánó	6–2, 6–1, 6–1
1937	(Hungary) Emil Gábori (3)	(Hungary) György Dallos	7–5, 6–2, 6–8, 8–6
1938	(Hungary) Ottó Szigeti	(Italy) Renato Bossi	4–6, 6–3, 6–3, 6–4
1939	men's event not held		
1940	(Hungary) József Asbóth	(Hungary) Emil Gábori	6–4, 8–6, 6–3
1943	(Hungary) József Asbóth (2)	(Hungary) Zoltán Katona	6–3, 8–6, 5–7, 6–1
1944	(Hungary) József Asbóth (3)	(Czechoslovakia) Ferdinand Vrba	7–5, 6–0, 6–3
1947	(Hungary) József Asbóth (4)	(Italy) Marcello del Bello	6–2, 6–4, 6–2
1948	(United States) Budge Patty	(Hungary) József Asbóth	6–1, 6–3, 1–6, 8–6
1957	(Hungary) András Ádám-Stolpa	(Hungary) József Asbóth	9–7, 1–6, 6–2, 6–3
1963	(Hungary) Andras Szikszai	(Hungary) Zoltán Katona	6–3, 2–6, 2–6, 6–2, 6-0
1967	(Hungary) Péter Szőke	(Hungary) Ferenc Komaromy	6–2, 6–4, 6–2
Open era
1968	(Hungary) Györgyi Fehér	(Hungary) Andras Szikszai	6–3, 7–5, 6–2
1969	(Brazil) Ronald Barnes	(Hungary) István Gulyás	6–4, 6–4, 6–3
1970	(Hungary) István Gulyás	(Colombia) William Álvarez	2–6, 4–6, 6–3, 6–3, 6–0

=== Women's singles ===
(Incomplete roll) two versions of the women's event was held in 1963 * April ** May.

Budapest International Championships
Year	Champion	Runner-up	Score
1903	(Hungary) Margit Madarász	(Hungary) Katalin Cséry	default.
1904	(Hungary) Margit Madarász (2)	(Hungary) Katalin Cséry	6–2, 7–5, 6–3
1905	(Austria) Marie Bertrand Amende	(Hungary) Margit Madarász	6-2 8-6
1906	Women's event not held		
1907	(Hungary) Margit Madarász (3)	(Austria) Sidi Klaus Maschka	6-2, 6-2
1908	(Hungary) Margit Madarász (4)	(South Africa) Mary. C. Whyte	1–6, 6–3, 4–6, 6–3, 6-4
1909	(Hungary) Katalin Cséry	(Hungary) Gabriella Szerviczky	6-1, 6-3
1910	Women's event not held		
1911	(Hungary) Sarolta Cséry	(Hungary) Eszter Mészáros	6-2, 6-3
1912	(Germany) Dagmar von Krohn	(Hungary) Hedwig N. von Satzger	6-2, 6-3
1913	Women's event not held		
1914	(Hungary) Sarika Csery (2)	(Hungary) Lili Nyeviczkey	6-2, 6-1
1915/1920	Women's event not held due to World War I and after		
1921	(Czechoslovakia) Margarete Janotta	(Austria) Mrs D. Mayer	6-0, 2–6, 6-4
1922	(Hungary) Ilona Váradi	(Czechoslovakia) Margarete Janotta	6-0, 6-3
1923	(Austria) Erna Wachsmann Redlich	(Germany) Frau Dedhatel	6-3, 6-2
1924	(Hungary) Ilona Péteriné (2)	(Austria) Erna Wachsmann Redlich	6-3, 6-3
1925	(Hungary) Ilona Péteriné (3)	(Germany) Paula Heimann	?
1926	(Hungary) Magda Baumgarten	(Hungary) Frl Dery	2-6 6-0 6-2
1927	(Germany) Mrs Schréderné	(Germany) Paula Heimann	6–4, 3–6, 6–2
1928	(Hungary) Magda Baumgarten (2)	(Hungary) Maria Uhlmann Paksy	7-5, 6-4
1929	(Hungary) Mrs Schréderné (2)	(Hungary) Magda Baumgarten	6-2 3-6 6-4
1930	(Germany) Toni Schomburgk	(Czechoslovakia) Grete Deutschova	6-2 6-4
1931	(Germany) Klara Hammer	(Poland) Jadwiga Jędrzejowska	3–6, 6–3, 9–7
1932	(United States) Helen Jacobs	(Germany) Hilde Krahwinkel	6–3, 3–6, 6–4
1933	(Hungary) Mrs Schréderné (3)	(Czechoslovakia) Grete Deutschova	6-4, 6-4
1934	(Hungary) Lili Sárkány	(Hungary) Mrs Schréderné	6-1, 6-4
1935	(Hungary) Mrs Schréderné (4)	(Hungary) Lili Sárkány	3–6, 6–2, 6–3
1936	(Poland) Jadwiga Jędrzejowska	(United States) Helen Jacobs	3–6, 6–1, 6–0
1937	(Poland) Jadwiga Jędrzejowska (2)	(Italy) Vittoria Tonolli	6-0, 6-1
1938	(Kingdom of Yugoslavia) Hella Kovac	(Hungary) Klára Somogyi	12-10, 2–6, 6-4
1939	Women's event not held		
1940	(Hungary) Suzy Körmöczy	(Hungary) Márta Popp	6-3, 6-0
1941–1942	Women's event not held		
1943	(Hungary) Márta Popp	(Hungary) Mrs Gallner	3–6, 6–3, 6–2
1944/1945	Women's event not held		
1946	(Hungary) Suzy Körmöczy (2)	(Hungary) Márta Popp	6–3, 4–6, 6–3
1947	(Hungary) Suzy Körmöczy (3)	(Hungary) Márta Popp	divided title
1948/1956	Women's event not held		
1957	(Hungary) Suzy Körmöczy (4)	(Hungary) Mrs N. Lepesne	7-5, 6-1
1958/1962	Women's event not held		
1963*	(Hungary) Klara Bardoczi	(Hungary) Erzsebet Solyom	6–8, 6–0, 6–4
1963**	(Hungary) Klara Bardoczi (2)	(Hungary) Erzsebet Solyom	6-4, 6-4
1964	(Hungary) Klara Bardoczi (3)	(Hungary) Gyöngyi Fehér	6-0, 6-4
1965/1969	Women's event not held		
Open era
1970	(Australia) Margaret Smith Court	(Czechoslovakia) Vlasta Vopickova	6-3, 6-2
1971	(Hungary) Judith Szörényi	(Hungary) Éva Szabó	6-2, 6-2
1972	(Argentina) Norma Baylon	(West Germany) Helga Niessen Masthoff	6–3, 3–6, 6–1
1973	(Czechoslovakia) Renáta Tomanová	(Argentina) Norma Baylon	6-4, 6-4
1974	Women's event not held		
1975	(Hungary) Judith Szörényi (2)	(Czechoslovakia) Renáta Tomanová	2–6, 7–5, 6–4
