= 1936 French Championships – Women's singles =

Women's singles
- 1936 French Championships

Final
- Champion: (Denmark) Hilde Sperling
- Runner-up: (France) Simonne Mathieu
- Score: 6–3, 6–4

Details
- Seeds: 8

Events
Singles	men	women
Doubles	men	women
← 1935 ·	French Championships	· 1937 →

First-seeded Hilde Sperling defeated Simonne Mathieu 6–3, 6–4 in the final to win the women's singles tennis title at the 1936 French Championships.

== Seeds ==
The seeded players are listed below. Hilde Sperling is the champion; others show the round in which they were eliminated.

1. (Denmark) Hilde Sperling (champion)
2. (France) Simonne Mathieu (finalist)
3. (United Kingdom) Margaret Scriven (second round)
4. (Poland) Jadwiga Jędrzejowska (third round)
5. (France) Simone Iribarne (quarterfinals)
6. (Netherlands) Madzy Rollin Couquerque (third round)
7. (France) Nelly Adamson (quarterfinals)
8. (France) Sylvie Henrotin (quarterfinals)

== Draw ==
=== Key ===
- Q = Qualifier
- WC = Wild card
- LL = Lucky loser
- r = Retired

=== Finals ===
Quarterfinals
1	(Denmark) Hilde Sperling	6	6
8	(France) Sylvie Henrotin	3	0
(Spain) Lilly De Alvarez	6	6
5	(France) Simone Iribarne	4	2
(Germany) Marie L. Horn	6	6
(France) Simone Goronitchenko	1	4
7	(France) Nelly Adamson	0	2
2	(France) Simonne Mathieu	6	6

Semifinals
1	(Denmark) Hilde Sperling	6	6
(Spain) Lilly De Alvarez	2	1
(Germany) Marie L. Horn	4	4
2	(France) Simonne Mathieu	6	6

Finals
1	(Denmark) Hilde Sperling	6	6
2	(France) Simonne Mathieu	3	4

=== Earlier rounds ===
==== Section 1 ====
First round

Second round
1	(Denmark) Sperling	6	6
(France) Barbier	1	0
Weaver	2	0
(France) Horner	6	6
8	(France) Henrotin	6	6
(Netherlands) Terwindt	1	1
(France) Peyre
(Kingdom of Yugoslavia) Kovac

Third round
1	(Denmark) Sperling	6	6
(France) Horner	1	1
8	(France) Henrotin	6	6
(Kingdom of Yugoslavia) Kovac	3	1

Quarterfinals
1	(Denmark) Sperling	6	6
8	(France) Henrotin	3	0

==== Section 2 ====
First round
(France) Wyns-Speranza	5	6	1
(Belgium) Isaac	7	4	6
(France) Orlandini
(Switzerland) Wittenstrom
(France) Kleinadel	3	2
(United Kingdom) Noel	6	6

Second round
4	(Poland) Jędrzejowska	6	6
(France) Bernard	1	3
(Spain) De Alvarez	6	6
(United States) Page	4	0
5	(France) Iribarne	6	6
(Belgium) Isaac	1	1
(Switzerland) Wittenstrom	0	0
(United Kingdom) Noel	6	6

Third round
4	(Poland) Jędrzejowska	6	5	4
(Spain) De Alvarez	2	7	6
5	(France) Iribarne	2	7	6
(United Kingdom) Noel	6	5	1

Quarterfinals
(Spain) De Alvarez	6	6
5	(France) Iribarne	4	2

==== Section 3 ====
First round
(France) Row
(France) Pannetier
(France) Aubert	5	0
(Germany) Horn	7	6
(France) Le Boutillier	4	8
(France) Belliard	6	10
(France) Neufeld	2	3
6	(Netherlands) Couquerque	6	6

Second round
(France) Pannetier	4	4
(Germany) Horn	6	6
(France) Belliard	6	5	5
6	(Netherlands) Couquerque	2	7	7
(France) Pillette	7	0
(Greece) Xydis	9	6
(France) Goronitchenko	0	6	8
3	(United Kingdom) Scriven	6	4	6

Third round
(Germany) Horn	2	6	8
6	(Netherlands) Couquerque	6	3	6
(Greece) Xydis	3	2
(France) Goronitchenko	6	6

Quarterfinals
(Germany) Horn	6	6
(France) Goronitchenko	1	4

==== Section 4 ====
First round

Second round
(France) Deutsch	1	0
(France) Goldschmidt	6	6
(France) Vives	3	1
7	(France) Adamson	6	6
(France) De St. Ferreol
(United States) Andrus
(United Kingdom) Weekes
2	(France) Mathieu

Third round
(France) Goldschmidt	3	2
7	(France) Adamson	6	6
(United States) Andrus
2	(France) Mathieu

Quarterfinals
7	(France) Adamson	6	6
2	(France) Mathieu	0	2

Preceded by 1936 Australian Championships – Women's singles	Grand Slam women's singles	Succeeded by 1936 Wimbledon Championships – Women's singles
