= 1938 French Championships (tennis) =

- Date: 2–11 June 1938
- Edition: 43rd
- Category: 14th Grand Slam (ITF)
- Surface: Clay
- Location: Paris (XVI^{e}), France
- Venue: Stade Roland Garros

Champions

Men's singles
- (United States) Don Budge

Women's singles
- (France) Simonne Mathieu

Men's doubles
- (France) Bernard Destremau / (France) Yvon Petra

Women's doubles
- (France) Simonne Mathieu / (United Kingdom) Billie Yorke

Mixed doubles
- (France) Simonne Mathieu / (Kingdom of Yugoslavia) Dragutin Mitić
← 1937 ·	French Championships	· 1939 →

The 1938 French Championships (now known as the French Open) was a tennis tournament that took place on the outdoor clay courts at the Stade Roland-Garros in Paris, France. The tournament ran from 2 June until 11 June. It was the 43rd staging of the French Championships and the second Grand Slam tournament of the year.

== Finals ==
=== Men's singles ===
(United States) Don Budge defeated (Czechoslovakia) Roderich Menzel 6–3, 6–2, 6–4

=== Women's singles ===
(France) Simonne Mathieu defeated (France) Nelly Adamson 6–0, 6–3

=== Men's doubles ===
(France) Bernard Destremau / (France) Yvon Petra defeated (United States) Don Budge / (United States) Gene Mako 3–6, 6–3, 9–7, 6–1

=== Women's doubles ===
(France) Simonne Mathieu / (United Kingdom) Billie Yorke defeated (France) Arlette Halff / (France) Nelly Landry 6–3, 6–3

=== Mixed doubles ===
(France) Simonne Mathieu / (Kingdom of Yugoslavia) Dragutin Mitić defeated (Australia) Nancye Wynne Bolton / (France) Christian Boussus 2–6, 6–3, 6–4

Preceded by 1938 Australian Championships	Grand Slams	Succeeded by 1938 Wimbledon Championships
