= 1939 French Championships – Women's singles =

Women's singles
- 1939 French Championships

Final
- Champion: (France) Simonne Mathieu
- Runner-up: (Poland) Jadwiga Jędrzejowska
- Score: 6–3, 8–6

Details
- Draw: 27
- Seeds: 6

Events
Singles	men	women
Doubles	men	women
← 1938 ·	French Championships	· 1946 →

First-seeded Simonne Mathieu defeated Jadwiga Jędrzejowska 6–3, 8–6 in the final to win the women's singles tennis title at the 1939 French Championships.

== Seeds ==
The seeded players are listed below. Simonne Mathieu is the champion; others show the round in which they were eliminated.

1. (France) Simonne Mathieu (champion)
2. (United States) Sarah Fabyan (quarterfinals)
3. (Poland) Jadwiga Jędrzejowska (finalist)
4. (United Kingdom) Mary Hardwick (quarterfinals)
5. (Netherlands) Madzy Rollin Couquerque (first round)
6. (France) Arlette Halff (quarterfinals)

== Draw ==
=== Key ===
- Q = Qualifier
- WC = Wild card
- LL = Lucky loser
- r = Retired

=== Finals ===
Quarterfinals
1	(France) Simonne Mathieu	6	6
(Luxembourg) Alice Weiwers	3	3
4	(United Kingdom) Mary Hardwick	5	4
(France) Suzanne Pannetier	7	6
6	(France) Arlette Halff	6	2	4
3	(Poland) Jadwiga Jędrzejowska	4	6	6
(France) M. Lebailly	6	6
2	(United States) Sarah Fabyan	1	1

Semifinals
1	(France) Simonne Mathieu	6	6
(France) Suzanne Pannetier	2	2
3	(Poland) Jadwiga Jędrzejowska	6	2	6
(France) M. Lebailly	3	6	3

Finals
1	(France) Simonne Mathieu	6	8
3	(Poland) Jadwiga Jędrzejowska	3	6

=== Earlier rounds ===
==== Section 1 ====
First round
1	(France) Mathieu	4	6	6
(France) Barbier	6	0	1
(United Kingdom) Noel	3	2
(Luxembourg) Weiwers	6	6
4	(United Kingdom) Hardwick	6	6
(France) St. Omer Roy	4	2
(France) Horner	0	3
(United States) Wheeler	6	6
5	(Netherlands) Couquerque	9	2	2
(France) Pannetier	7	6	6
(Hungary) Somogyi	6	6
(Kingdom of Yugoslavia) Kovac	3	3

Second round
1	(France) Mathieu	6	6
(France) Mellerio	1	2
Sioda
(Luxembourg) Weiwers
4	(United Kingdom) Hardwick	10	7
(United States) Wheeler	8	5
(France) Pannetier	8	8
(Hungary) Somogyi	6	6

Quarterfinals
1	(France) Mathieu	6	6
(Luxembourg) Weiwers	3	3
4	(United Kingdom) Hardwick	5	4
(France) Pannetier	7	6

Semifinals
1	(France) Mathieu	6	6
(France) Pannetier	2	2

==== Section 2 ====
First round
(France) Morel-Deville	3	1
(France) Kleinadel	6	6
(United Kingdom) Jarvis	4	1
6	(France) Halff	6	6
(France) Goldschmidt	2	1
3	(Poland) Jędrzejowska	6	6
(Kingdom of Yugoslavia) Florian	1	4
(France) Lebailly	6	6
(United Kingdom) Brown	3	6	2
(France) Simon	6	3	6

Second round
(France) Kleinadel	2	6	4
6	(France) Halff	6	2	6
(France) Wyns-Speranza	0	1
3	(Poland) Jędrzejowska	6	6
Kerckoff	2	0
(France) Lebailly	6	6
(France) Simon	6	5	1
2	(United States) Fabyan	4	7	6

Quarterfinals
6	(France) Halff	6	2	4
3	(Poland) Jędrzejowska	4	6	6
(France) Lebailly	6	6
2	(United States) Fabyan	1	1

Semifinals
3	(Poland) Jędrzejowska	6	2	6
(France) Lebailly	3	6	3

Preceded by 1939 Australian Championships – Women's singles	Grand Slam women's singles	Succeeded by 1939 Wimbledon Championships – Women's singles
