= Genoa International =

Genoa International Internazionale di Genova

Defunct tennis tournament
- Founded: 1928; 97 years ago
- Abolished: 1968; 57 years ago
- Location: Genoa, Liguria, Italy.
- Surface: Clay

The Genoa International or Internazionale di Genova at times also known as the Genoa Championships or Campionati di Genova was a men's and women's international clay court tennis tournament founded in 1959. It was played at the Tennis Club Genova, Genoa, Liguria, Italy. The tournament ran until 1968.

== History ==
In April 1928 Tennis Club Genova in Genoa, established an open international tennis tournament for men and women. The tournament was played on outdoor clay courts in Liguria, Italy. The event was part of the Italian Riviera circuit of tennis tournaments. During the 1930s the tournament was branded as the Genoa Championships or Campionati di Genova. The 1940 edition was held in conjunction with the Coppa Federazione Fascista. The tournament was staged till 1968.

== Finals ==
=== Men's singles ===
(incomplete roll) included:

| Year | Winner | Runner-up | Score |
|---|---|---|---|
| 1928 | (Italy) Uberto De Morpurgo | (Italy) Emanuele Sertorio | 6–2, 8–6, 6–1 |
| 1930 | (United Kingdom) Pat Hughes | (Italy) Roberto Bocciardo | 6–3, 6–1, 6–0 |
| 1931 | (Japan) Hyotaro Sato | (Italy) Augusto Rado | 6–3, 3–6, 3-,6 6–4, 6–3 |
| 1932 | (Italy) Augusto Rado | (France) Georges Mitaranga | 6–0, 6–1, 6–3 |
| 1933 | (South Africa) Jack O'Shea | (Italy) Leonardo Bonzi | ? |
| 1934 | (Italy) Giovanni Palmieri | (United States) Wilmer Hines | 4–6, 5–7, 6–3, 6–3, 6–3 |
| 1936 | (Italy) Giovanni Palmieri (2) | (Italy) Augusto Rado | 6–2, 6–1, 3–6, 6–1 |
| 1939 | (Italy) Gianni Cucelli | (Czechoslovakia) Vojtech Vodicka | 6–4, 6–3, 4–6, 6–4 |
| 1940 | (Hungary) József Asbóth | (Socialist Federal Republic of Yugoslavia) Franjo Punčec | 6–4, 6–3, 6–4 |
| 1942 | (Italy) Francesco Romanoni | (Italy) Marcello Del Bello | final suspended |
| 1945 | (Italy) Marcello del Bello | (Italy) Rolando Del Bello | 6–2, 6–3, 6–8, 6–2 |
| 1954 | (Argentina) Enrique Morea | (Italy) Fausto Gardini | 6–3, 7–5, 6–4 |
| 1955 | (Italy) Fausto Gardini | (United States) Art Larsen | 6–4, 6–8, 6–2, 6–2. |
| 1956 | (Chile) Luis Alberto Ayala | (Egypt) Jaroslav Drobný | 6–2, 6–2, 6–1. |
| 1968 | (Romania) Ion Țiriac | (Italy) Pietro Marzano | 8–6, 6–2 |

=== Men's doubles ===
(incomplete roll)

| Year | Winner | Runner-up | Score |
|---|---|---|---|
| 1928 | (Italy) Mino Balbi Di Robecco (Italy) Giacomo Bocciardo | (Italy) Uberto De Morpurgo (Italy) Mr. Abbiati | 6–2 6–3 2–6 5–7 7–5 |

=== Women's singles ===
(incomplete roll)

| Year | Winner | Runner-up | Score |
|---|---|---|---|
| 1930 | (United Kingdom) Phyllis Satterthwaite | (Italy) Ada Prada | default |
| 1933 | (Germany) Edith Sander | (United States) Dorothy Burke | 6–2, 6–3 |
| 1939 | (Germany) Klara Beutter-Hammer | (Italy) Wally San Donnino | 6–1, 6–2 |
| 1940 | (Socialist Federal Republic of Yugoslavia) Hella Kovac | (Germany) Anneliese Ullstein | 3–6, 6–3, 6–0 |
| 1954 | (Germany) Totta Zehden | (Italy) Nicla Migliori | 6–3, 1–6, 6–2 |
| 1956 | (United States) Althea Gibson | (Australia) Thelma Long | 6–3, 6–4 |
| 1968 | (Italy) Lea Pericoli | (Belgium) Ingrid Loeys | 8–6, 6–2 |

=== Mixed doubles ===
(incomplete roll)

| Year | Winner | Runner-up | Score |
|---|---|---|---|
| 1939 | (Italy) Gianni Cucell (Germany) Klara Beutter-Hammer | (Italy) Augusto Rado (Italy) Giuliana Grioni | 6–2, 4–6, 6–0 |
| 1940 | (Italy) Gino Vido (Italy) Vittoria Tonolli | (Hungary) József Asbóth (Hungary) Klára Somogyi | 6–4, 3–6, 6–1 |
| 1954 | (Italy) Orlando Sirola (United Kingdom) Elaine Watson | (Italy) Fausto Gardini (United Kingdom) Pat Ward | 3–6, 6–2, 6–4 |
| 1956 | (Italy) Orlando Sirola (2) (United States) Althea Gibson | (Chile) Luis Ayala (Australia) Thelma Long | 6–4, 1–2, ret. |
