= 1939 French Championships (tennis) =

- Date: 8–17 June 1939
- Edition: 44th
- Category: 15th Grand Slam (ITF)
- Surface: Clay
- Location: Paris (XVI^{e}), France
- Venue: Stade Roland Garros

Champions

Men's singles
- (United States) Don McNeill

Women's singles
- (France) Simonne Mathieu

Men's doubles
- (United States) Don McNeill / (United States) Charles Harris

Women's doubles
- (France) Simonne Mathieu / (Poland) Jadwiga Jędrzejowska

Mixed doubles
- (United States) Sarah Palfrey / (United States) Elwood Cooke
← 1938 ·	French Championships	· 1946 →

The 1939 French Championships (now known as the French Open) was a tennis tournament that took place on the outdoor clay courts at the Stade Roland-Garros in Paris, France. The tournament ran from 8 June until 17 June. It was the 44th staging of the French Championships and the last one held before a six-year hiatus due to World War II. It was the second of four Grand Slam tennis events of the year.

== Finals ==
=== Men's singles ===
(United States) Don McNeill defeated (United States) Bobby Riggs 7–5, 6–0, 6–3

=== Women's singles ===
(France) Simonne Mathieu defeated (Poland) Jadwiga Jędrzejowska 6–3, 8–6

=== Men's doubles ===
(United States) Don McNeill / (United States) Charles Harris defeated (France) Jean Borotra / (France) Jacques Brugnon 4–6, 6–4, 6–0, 2–6, 10–8

=== Women's doubles ===
(France) Simonne Mathieu / (Poland) Jadwiga Jędrzejowska defeated (Kingdom of Yugoslavia) Alice Florian / (Kingdom of Yugoslavia) Hella Kovac 7–5, 7–5

=== Mixed doubles ===
(United States) Sarah Palfrey / (United States) Elwood Cooke defeated (France) Simonne Mathieu / (Kingdom of Yugoslavia) Franjo Kukuljević 4–6, 6–1, 7–5

Preceded by 1939 Australian Championships	Grand Slams	Succeeded by 1939 Wimbledon Championships
