= Stade Roland Garros =

Tennis venue in Paris, France

Coordinates: 48°50′50″N 2°14′47″E

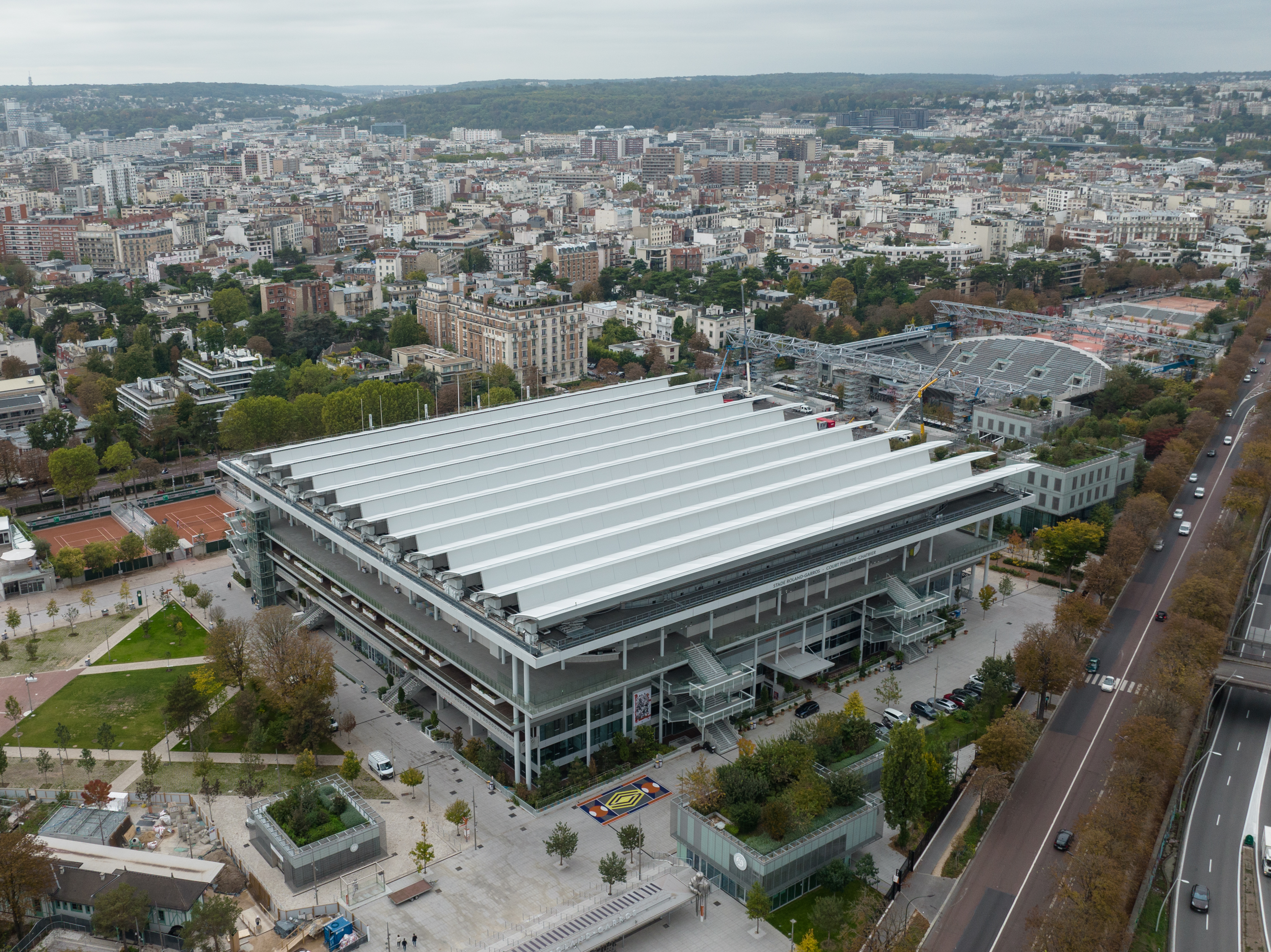
- Court Philippe Chatrier in 2022, the complex's centerpiece and principal venue
- Interactive map of Stade Roland Garros
- Location: 16th arrondissement, Paris, France
- Owner: Administration of Paris
- Capacity: 15,000 (Court Philippe Chatrier); 10,068 (Court Suzanne Lenglen); 5,000 (Court Simonne Mathieu)
- Surface: Clay (see text)
- Public transit: Porte d'Auteuil; Michel-Ange–Molitor

Construction
- Opened: 1928

Tenant
- Fédération Française de Tennis

Stade Roland Garros (French pronunciation: [stad ʁɔlɑ̃ ɡaʁɔs]; 'Roland Garros Stadium') is a complex of tennis courts, including stadiums, located in Paris that hosts the French Open. That tournament, also known as Roland Garros, is a major tennis championship played annually in late May and early June. The complex is named after Roland Garros (1888–1918), a pioneering French aviator, and was constructed in 1928 to host France's first defence of the Davis Cup.

The 13.5-hectare (34-acre) complex contains twenty courts, including three large-capacity stadiums; Les Jardins de Roland Garros, a large restaurant and bar complex; Le Village, the press and VIP area; France's National Training Centre (CNE); and the Tenniseum, a bilingual, multimedia museum of the history of tennis.

== Dedication ==
The facility is named after Roland Garros, a pilot who completed the first solo flight across the Mediterranean Sea, engineer (inventor of the first forward-firing aircraft machine gun), and World War I hero who shot down four enemy aircraft (though popularly believed to be five). Garros was killed in aerial combat in October 1918.

== History ==
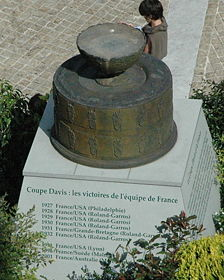
Monument in Place des Mousquetaires to France's string of Davis Cup victories (1927–1933). Stade Roland Garros was constructed to provide a venue for France's first successful Cup defense in 1928.

France was an important power in tennis during the first half of the 20th century due to the dominance of Suzanne Lenglen during the 1910s and 1920s, and les Quatre Mousquetaires ("the Four Musketeers")—Jacques "Toto" Brugnon, Jean Borotra (the "Bouncing Basque"), Henri Cochet (the "Magician"), and René Lacoste (the "Crocodile")—in the 1920s and 1930s. In 1927, France defeated the United States to win the Davis Cup, due largely to the Musketeers' efforts. Stade Roland Garros was constructed as a venue for France's successful defense the following year. France retained the Cup until 1933, again largely because of the Musketeers. A monument to France's six Cup championships stands at the center of Place des Mousquetaires, a circular courtyard near the venue's entrance.

In October 1939, shortly after the outbreak of World War II, the facility was used as a detention centre where "indésirables"—mostly Hungarians, Russians, Italians, Poles, and citizens suspected of being communists—were held pending imprisonment. Journalist and former communist Arthur Koestler reported that at the time of his detention, posters advertising the last match prior to the outbreak of war, between Cochet and Borotra, were still in place.

== Playing surface ==
While the Stade Roland Garros surface is invariably characterized as "red clay", the courts are in fact surfaced with white limestone covered with a few millimeters of powdered red brick dust. Beneath the 3-inch (7.6 cm) layer of porous limestone is 6 inches (15 cm) of volcanic rock, followed by 3 feet (91 cm) of sand, all of which rests on a slab of concrete. Crushed brick is pressed onto the limestone surface with rollers, then drenched in water. The process is repeated several times until a thin, compact layer coats each court. The crushed brick is deep enough to allow footprints and ball marks, but shallow enough to avoid making the court spongy or slippery. In tournaments workers smooth the surface before matches and between sets by dragging rectangular lengths of chain-link across it. The red brick dust is replenished as needed (daily during major tournaments).

The surface was a state-of-the art solution, in 1928, to the biggest problem with natural clay courts: poor drainage. At the time it was not unusual for clay surfaces to be unplayable for two to three days after even short periods of precipitation. The limestone/crushed brick combination, originally developed in Great Britain, played and looked similar to clay without clay's drainage issues, thus rendering natural clay obsolete as a tennis court surface. Since then a multitude of other "fast-dry" and synthetic clay surfaces have been developed. Courts surfaced with these materials play much like natural clay surfaces and are collectively classified as "clay courts", despite the fact that few if any true clay courts have been built for almost a century. The diversity in composition of various "clay" surfaces around the world explains the extraordinary variability in their playing characteristics. Venus Williams has said: "All clay courts are different. None play the same. [Roland Garros] plays the best."

== Stadium courts ==
=== Court Philippe Chatrier ===
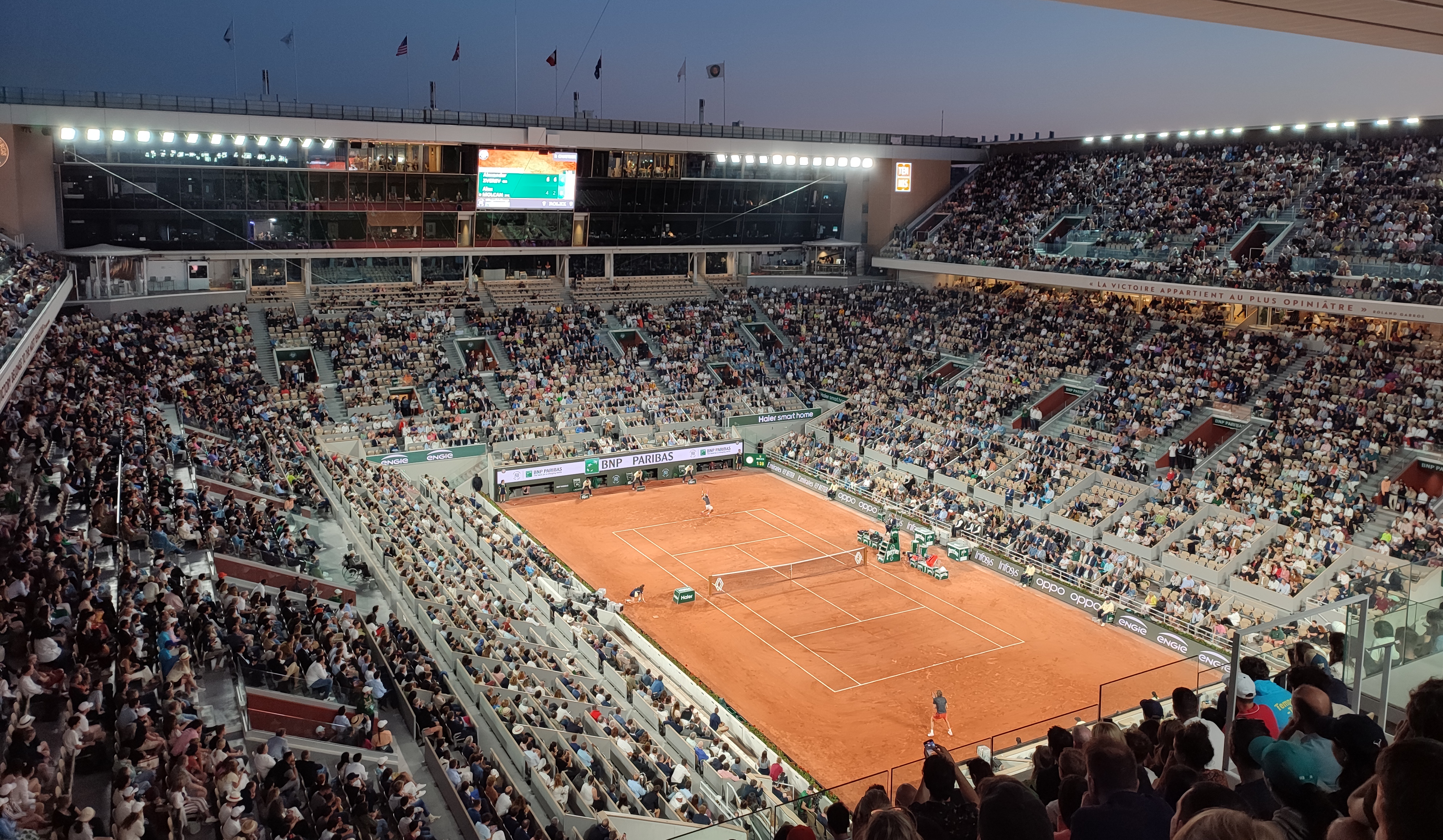
Court Philippe Chatrier in 2023

Court Philippe Chatrier was built in 1928 as Stade Roland Garros's centerpiece and remains its principal venue. It seats 15,225 spectators as of a 2019 renovation. The stadium was known simply as "Court Central" until 2001 when it was renamed for the long-time president of the Fédération Française de Tennis (FFT) who helped restore tennis as a Summer Olympics sport in 1988.

The four main spectator grandstands are named for the Four Musketeers—Brugnon, Borotra, Cochet, and Lacoste—in honor of their Davis Cup success, which prompted construction of the facility, and the stadium. As a further tribute, the trophy awarded each year to the French Open men's singles champion is known as La Coupe des Mousquetaires.

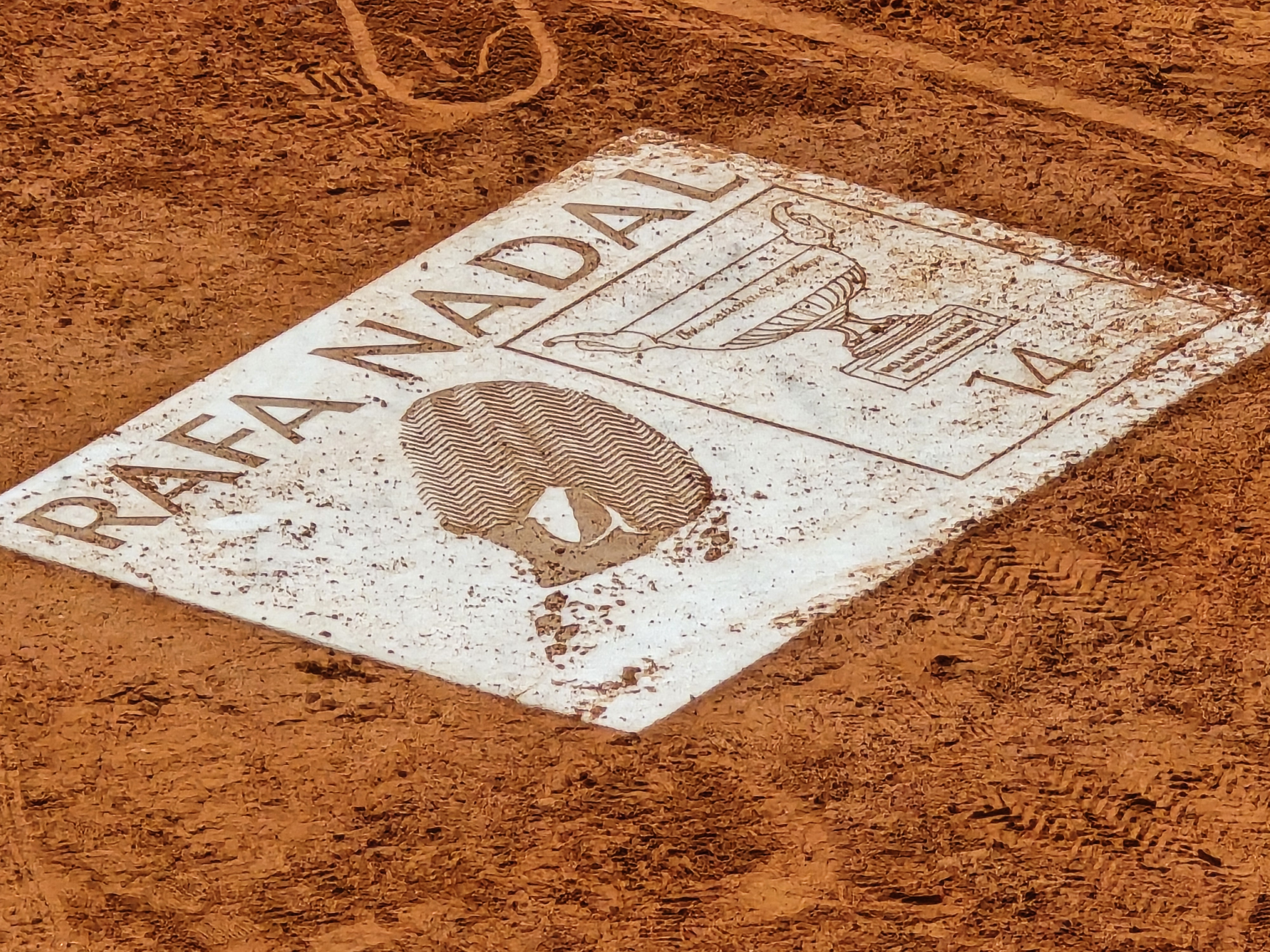
Commemorative plaque to Rafael Nadal unveiled during a tribute at the 2025 French Open, on the soil of the Court Philippe Chatrier

After the completion of the 2018 tournament, the stadium was demolished down to its foundations and rebuilt with steeper grandstands in time for the 2019 tournament. A retractable roof and floodlights were added in time for the 2020 tournament, which was delayed to September of that year due to the COVID-19 pandemic.

In 2025, on the first day of the 2025 French Open, a plaque commemorating Rafael Nadal's 14 Roland Garros trophies was unveiled set in the stadium's clay. The ceremony was attended by Nadal, Roger Federer, Novak Djokovic, and Andy Murray, who came to pay tribute to Nadal's career.

=== Court Suzanne Lenglen ===
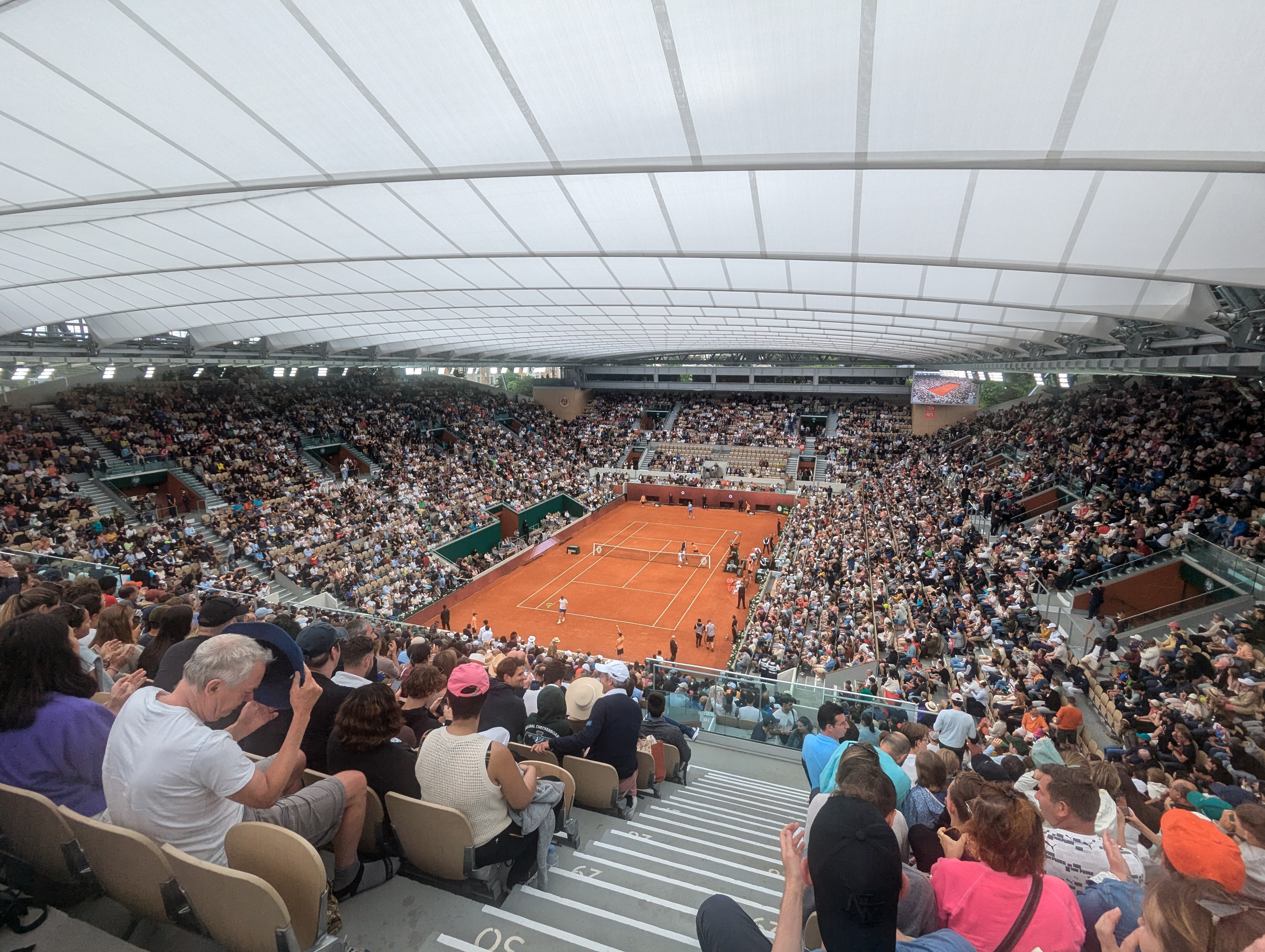
Court Suzanne Lenglen with the new retractable roof closed in 2024

Built in 1994 and originally designated "Court A", Court Suzanne Lenglen is the secondary stadium with a capacity of 10,068 spectators. Its namesake, an international celebrity and the first true star of women's tennis, won 31 major tournaments, including six French Open titles and six Wimbledon championships, between 1914 and 1926. Known as La Divine (Divine One) and La Grand Dame (Great Lady) of French tennis, she won two Olympic gold medals in Antwerp in 1920. A bronze bas relief of Lenglen by the Italian sculptor Vito Tongiani stands over the east tunnel-entrance to the stadium. The trophy awarded each year to the French Open women's singles champion is named La Coupe Suzanne Lenglen in her honor. The court has an underground irrigation system, the first of its kind, to control moisture levels within its surface.

In 1994, the walkway between Court Chatrier and Court Lenglen was named Allée Marcel Bernard in honor of the 1940s-era French champion who died that year. A retractable roof that covers the court was installed in time for the 2024 Summer Olympic Games. It was inaugurated on 26 May 2024 on the occasion of the first day of the French Open tennis tournament. It is made up of two lateral structures measuring 100 meters by 20 meters, and a white canvas. The roof closes in 15 minutes. It is inspired by Suzanne Lenglen's pleated skirt, and the structure is equipped with photovoltaic panels.

=== Court Simonne Mathieu ===
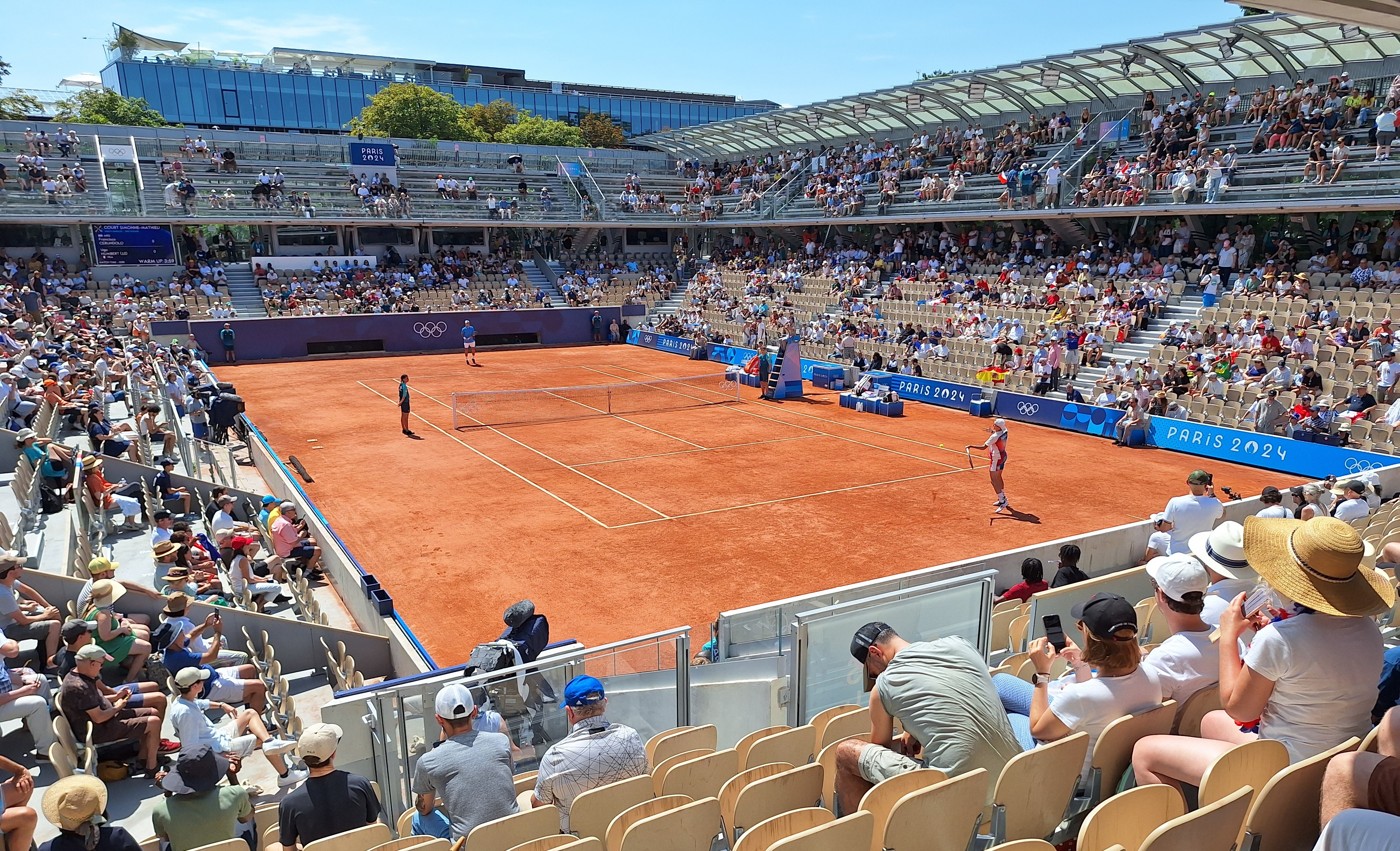
Court Simonne Mathieu at the 2024 Summer Olympics

The 5,000-seat tertiary venue was completed in March 2019. Technically located just outside the Roland Garros compound, but operated as part of the tennis complex, Court Simonne Mathieu was built on the adjacent municipal grounds of the Jardin des Serres d'Auteuil. The court's namesake, Simonne Mathieu, was the 1938 and 1939 women's singles champion who is also remembered as a leader of the French Resistance during the Second World War. The tennis court surface is four meters below ground level with greenhouses integrated on all four sides of the stadium, which blend in with the plant holding greenhouses elsewhere in the municipal garden. Court Simonne Mathieu was built to replace the former Court 1, located inside the tennis complex, which was demolished.

=== Court 1 ===
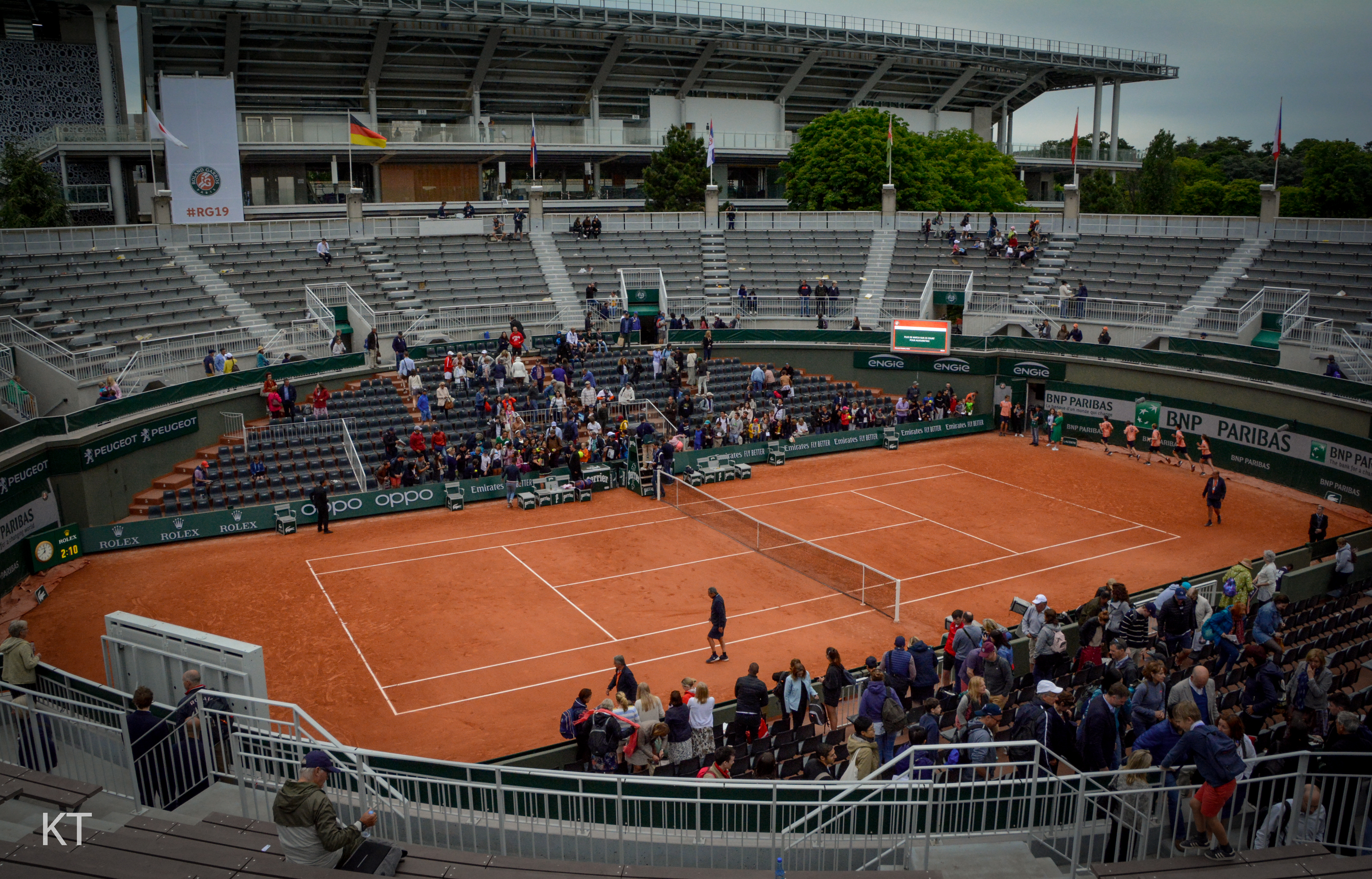
The now demolished Court 1 during the 2019 tournament

Court 1, once the facility's third show court or tertiary venue, and nicknamed the "Bullring" because of its circular shape, was demolished in 2019. Its architect, Jean Lovera, a former French junior champion, designed the 3,800-seat structure as a deliberate contrast to the adjacent, angular Court Philippe Chatrier. Built in 1980, the Bullring was a favorite among serious tennis fans because of its relatively small size and feeling of close proximity to the action. An unusual design feature was its press seating in the first row at court level behind the south baseline.

Court 1 was the scene of several memorable French Open upsets, such as unseeded Gustavo Kuerten's third-round victory over fifth-seeded former champion Thomas Muster in 1997, on his way to his first of three Open titles; and third-seeded Gabriela Sabatini's defeat — after a 6–1, 5–1 lead and five match points — to Mary Joe Fernandez in the 1993 quarterfinals. It was also the site of Marat Safin's famous "dropped pants" match against Félix Mantilla in 2004.

Demolition of Court 1 began shortly after conclusion of the 2019 tournament and inauguration of the new tertiary venue, Court Simonne Mathieu. In its place, a greatly enlarged Place des Mousquetaires was constructed, where spectators can watch matches on a large video screen.

== Tenniseum ==
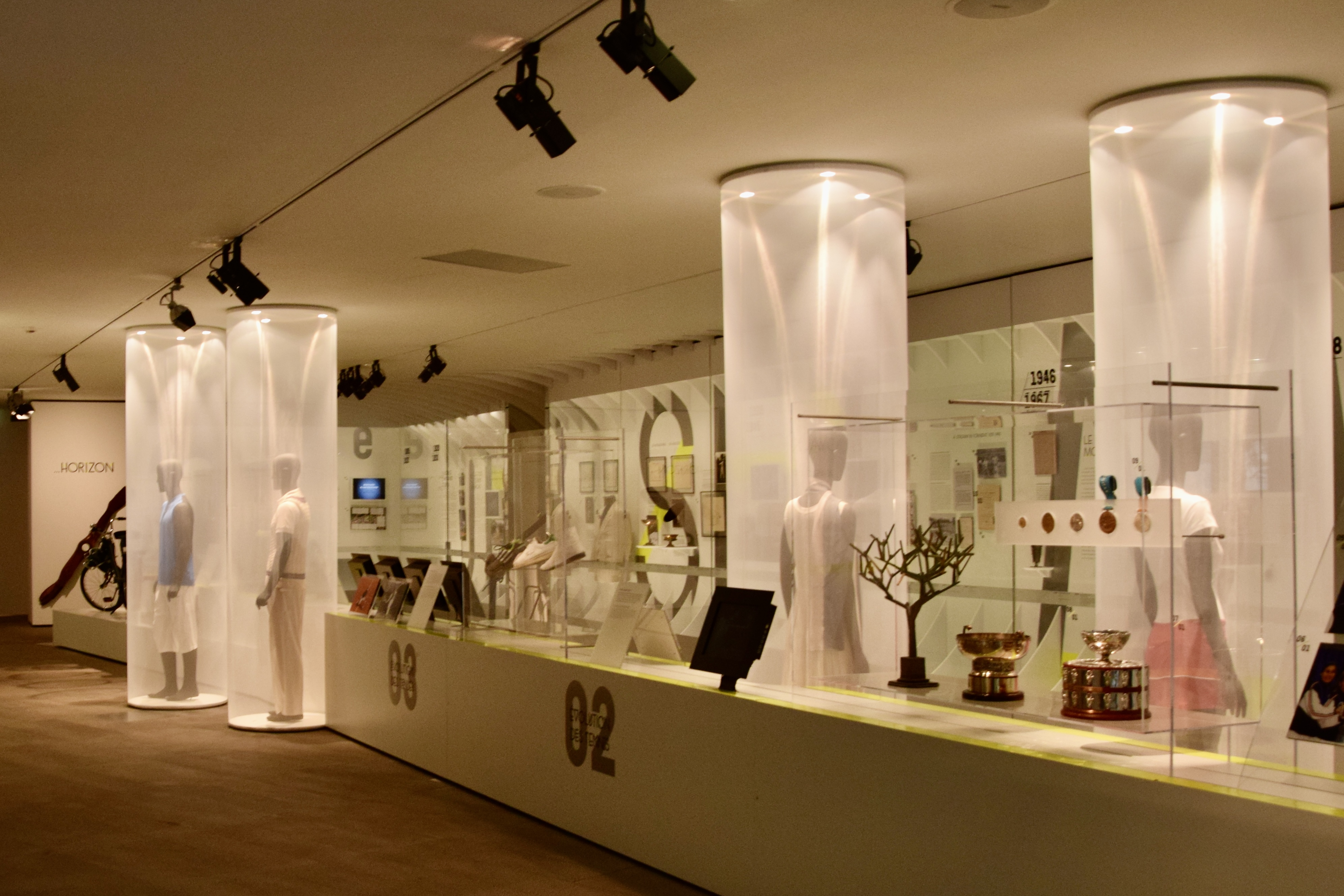
French Tennis Federation Museum

Known officially as the Museum of the French Federation of Tennis, the Tenniseum was designed by the French architect Bruno Moinard and opened in May 2003. It is housed in a former groundsman's cottage, and comprises a multimedia center, media library, and permanent and temporary exhibits dedicated to the history of tennis in general, and the French Open in particular. Permanent exhibits include a display of the French Open perpetual trophies, including La Coupe des Mousquetaires and La Coupe Suzanne Lenglen; a narrative and photographic history of Stade Roland Garros; displays documenting the evolution of tennis attire through the years; a comprehensive collection of tennis racquets dating back to the mid-19th century; and a large exhibition of tennis-related photographs and paintings.

The media library houses a diverse collection of documents, posters, books, and magazines, as well as a database of tennis information, statistics, trivia, and match summaries of all French Open tournament matches since 1928. The bilingual (French/English) multimedia center contains over 4,000 hours of digitized video, including documentaries, interviews with many of the sport's legendary players, and film archives dating from 1897 to the present. Tours are conducted daily. (Two per day, at 11:00am and 3:00pm, are in English.) During the French Open, the normal entry fee is waived for tournament ticket-holders.

== Expansion project ==
=== Original plans ===
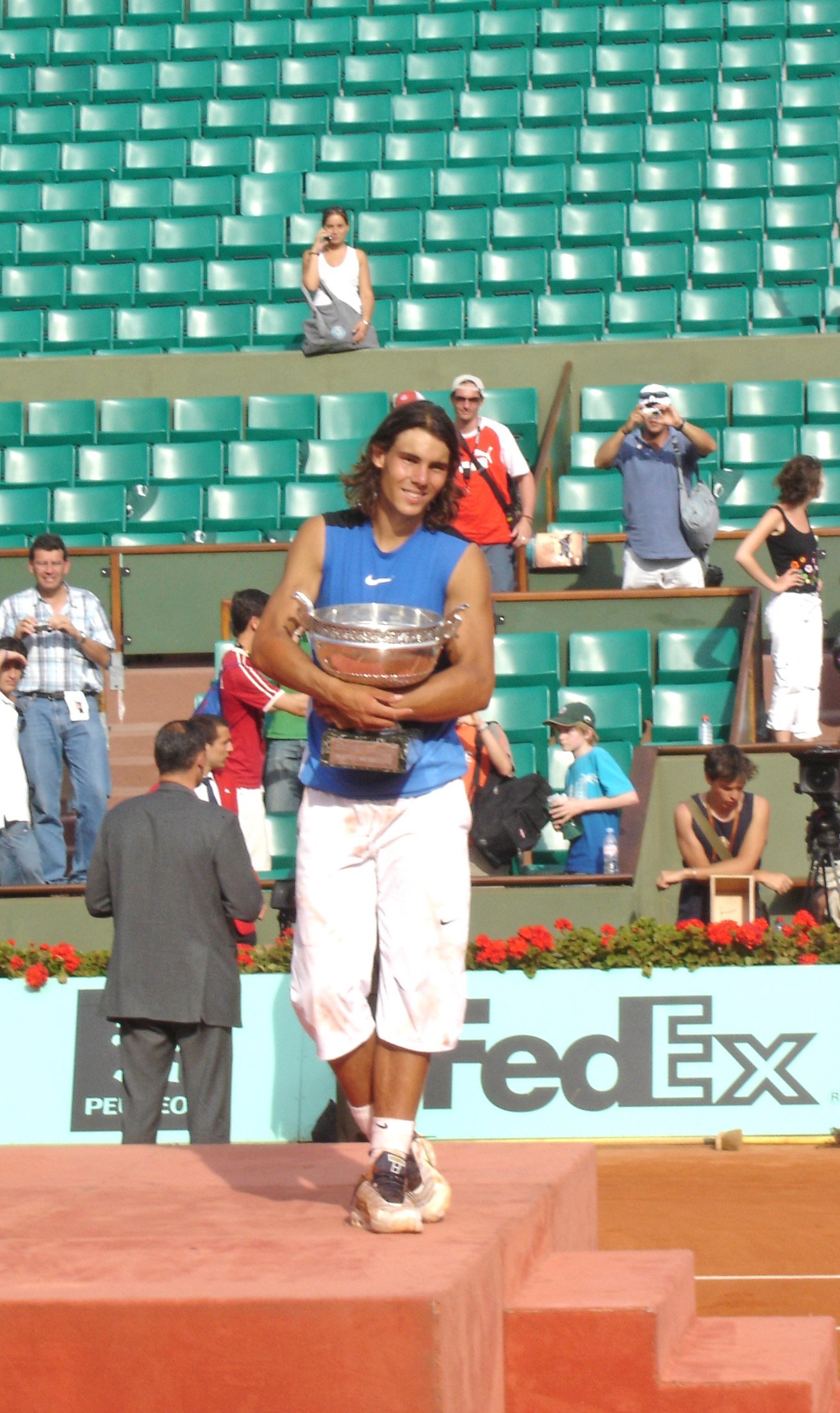
Rafael Nadal holding La Coupe des Mousquetaires after the ceremony of his second French Open title in 2006

In 2009 the FFT announced that it had commissioned the French architect Marc Mimram to design a significant expansion of Stade Roland Garros. On the current property, the proposal called for the addition of lights and a retractable roof over Court Philippe Chatrier. At the nearby Georges Hébert municipal recreation area, east of Stade Roland Garros at Porte d'Auteuil, a fourth stadium was planned with a retractable roof and 14,600 seating capacity, along with two smaller show courts with seating for 1,500 and 750.

In 2010, faced with opposition to the proposed expansion from factions within the Paris City Council, the FFT announced that it was considering an alternate plan to move the French Open to a new, 55-court venue outside of Paris city limits. The three sites under consideration were Marne-la-Vallée, the northern Paris suburb of Gonesse, and a vacant army base near Versailles. Amid charges of bluffing and brinkmanship, a spokesman explained that because Stade Roland Garros was less than half the size of the other three Grand Slam venues and had no covered courts, the French Open was at risk of losing its Grand Slam status to Madrid—which has a long clay court tradition and larger facilities—or the Gulf countries.

In February 2011, the FFT voted to keep the tournament at Stade Roland Garros, citing the prohibitive expense ($630 million to $1 billion) of building a new venue from scratch versus a projected $370 million to carry out the proposed expansion. Further details of the plan were announced in May 2013, including a complete rebuild of the Chatrier court on its existing foundations in addition to the new roof and lights, and a larger Place des Mousquetaires in the area occupied by Court 1. The new stadium at Porte d'Auteuil would be built below ground level, with greenhouses surrounding it on all four sides. Project deadlines were pushed back from 2016 to 2018. Local residents, wildlife enthusiasts and municipal authorities continued to voice opposition to the plan, which would increase the Stade Roland Garros grounds from 21 acres (8.5 hectares) to about 33.8 acres (13.5 hectares).

=== Environmental concerns and delays ===
In February 2015 the Ministry of Ecology issued a negative report, and the project was placed on hold pending completion of a new land use study for the City Council. In June, Paris Mayor Anne Hidalgo announced that construction permits had been signed, with a new cost estimate of $450 million and completion scheduled for 2019. Opponents, who objected to the demolition of 2.5 acres (1 hectare) of greenhouses and biological gardens at the Jardin des Serres d'Auteuil on the eastern border of the current ground, proposed an alternate, northward expansion into the Bois de Boulogne that would require covering a portion of the A13 highway. Proponents of the eastward expansion argued that further delays would jeopardize Paris's bid for the 2024 Summer Olympics.

In December 2015, the Paris Administrative Court ordered suspension of reclamation work involving the Auteuil botanical garden greenhouses. In a statement, the FFT responded that the greenhouses would not be destroyed, and would, in fact, be embellished. FFT also noted that opponents of the eastward expansion "[did] not have good alternatives from the operational, legal and environmental point of view", and added that expansion into the Bois de Boulogne was impossible. In February 2017, the last of the legal challenges were resolved and work resumed on the original eastward expansion plan.

=== Resumption ===
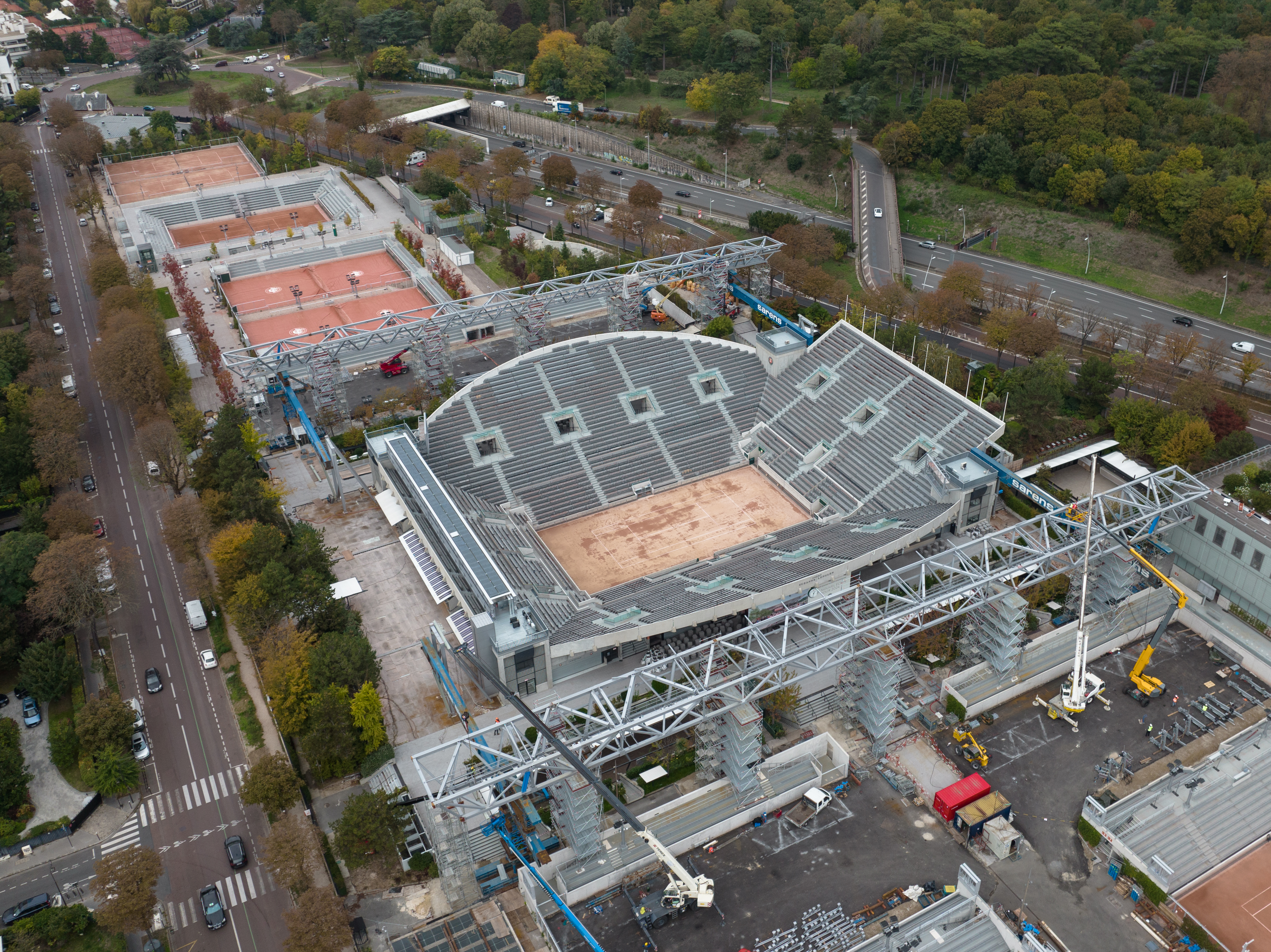
Court Suzanne Lenglen in 2022

The new tournament organization building and Village, new courts 7 and 9, the expanded Place des Mousquetaires, and a new show court in the Fond des Princes area west of Court Lenglen were completed in time for the 2018 Open. The Court des Serres, renamed Court Simonne Mathieu, was opened in March 2019, ready for the 2019 tournament, as was the rebuilt Court Chatrier, with the retractable roof completed in time for the 2020 tournament.

In 2021, the redevelopment of courts 2 and 3 and the renovation work at the Place des Mousquetaires were finished. This included the inauguration of statues to Rafael Nadal (who has won the French Open singles title a record 14 times), Roland Garros, and the "Four Musketeers" (Borotra, Brugnon, Cochet, and Lacoste). In the same year, the tournament introduced night sessions on Court Philippe Chatrier for the first time in its history. Court Suzanne Lenglen will have a retractable roof completed in time for the 2024 Summer Olympics.

== Location ==
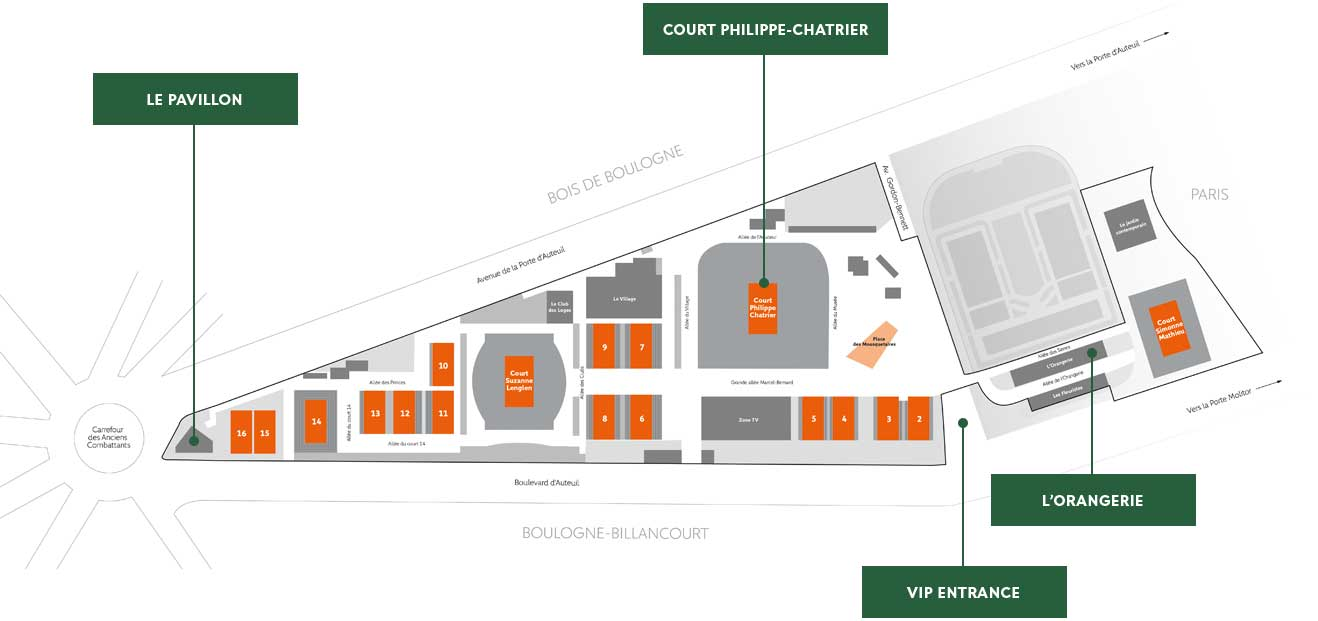
Map of the modernized complex from 2023.

Stade Roland Garros is located at the western side of Paris, at the southern boundary of the Bois de Boulogne in Paris's 16th arrondissement. The triangular property is bounded by Avenue Porte d'Auteuil and A13 autoroute on the north and Boulevard d'Auteuil on the south. The eastern boundary is Avenue Gordon Bennett and the adjacent Jardin des Serres d'Auteuil.

== Transportation ==
The closest Métro stations are Porte d'Auteuil (Line 10) and Michel-Ange–Molitor (Line 9, Line 10), to the north- and southeast respectively.

- Bus: Routes 22, 32, 52, 62, 72, 123, 241 and PC1
- Vélib': Stations 16 034, 16 035 and 16 036

A special Stade Roland Garros taxi stand operates in May and June during the French Open on the southeast corner of the venue grounds, at the corner of Robert Schuman Avenue and Auteuil Boulevard.

== See also ==
- List of tennis stadiums by capacity

Preceded by Germantown Cricket Club; Philadelphia, Pennsylvania	Davis Cup; Final Venue; 1928 • 1929 • 1930 • 1931 • 1932 • 1933	Succeeded by Centre Court, Wimbledon; London
Preceded by Blau-Weiss T.C. West Berlin	Fed Cup; Final Venue; 1968	Succeeded by Athens Tennis Club; Athens
