= Wilmer Hines =

American tennis player (1912–1960)

- Full name: Wilmer Moore Hines
- Country (sports): USA
- Born: 19 July 1912 Lake City, South Carolina, United States
- Died: January 1960 (age 48) Scottsdale, Arizona, United States
- Turned pro: 1929 (amateur tour)
- Retired: 1940

Singles
- Career record: 107–65
- Career titles: 10

Grand Slam singles results
- French Open: 3R (1934, 1935)
- Wimbledon: 2R (1935)
- US Open: 3R (1934)
- US Pro: 2R (1938)

Wilmer Moore Hines (19 July 1912 – January 1960) was an American tennis player. He was active from 1929 to 1940 and won 10 career singles titles.

== Career ==
Wilmer Hines was born in Lake City, South Carolina, United States on 19 July 1912. At aged 17 he played his first tournament at the Mid-South Tournament in Pinehurst, North Carolina in November 1929 where he won his first title. In major amateur tournaments his best results in singles were reaching the third round of the French Championships in 1934 and 1935. He reached the third round of the U.S. National Championships in 1934. At the Wimbledon Championships he reached the second round in 1935 where he lost to Fred Perry.

In the first five years of his career his title wins came mainly in the United States including a second Mid-South Tournament title in 1930. In the 1933 season he won three titles including the Memphis Invitation, Mid-Dixie Championships and Middle Atlantic States Championships.

In 1934 he travelled to Europe to play on the French Riviera circuit where he won the Beausoleil Championships, then the Macomber Cup both held in Monte Carlo. That year he also played at tournaments on the Italian Riviera circuit and throughout Italy where he lost a number of finals. In early 1935 he returned to Europe once again where he won the South of France Championships. His biggest international tour win came at the Italian International Championships in April 1935. In July 1935 he won his final amateur singles title at the historic Longwood Bowl.

In 1938 he turned professional and competed at the U.S. Pro Tennis Championships where he was beaten by George Lott in the second round. In 1940 he played his final tournament at the White Sulphur Springs Open.

== Career finals ==
=== Singles (20), titles (10), runners up (10) ===
(*) Denotes All-Comers final (w.o.) denotes walkover.

Category + (Titles)
Grand Slam/World Championship (0)
National ()
International (4)
Provincial/Regional/State (1)
County (0)
Regular (5)

Titles by Surface
Clay – Outdoor (6)
Grass – Outdoor (3)
Hard – Outdoor (0)
Unknown – Outdoor (1)
Carpet – Indoor (0)
Wood – Indoor (0)

| No | Result | Date | Tournament | Surface | Opponent | Score |
|---|---|---|---|---|---|---|
| 1. | Win | 2-Nov-1929 | Mid-South Tournament | Clay | (United States) Mr. Crosland | 6–3, 4–6, 7–5, 6–4. |
| 2. | Win | 30-Oct-1930 | Mid-South Tournament | Clay | (United States) Edgar Yeomans | 7–5, 8–6, 6–2. |
| 1. | Loss | 16‑Jul‑1932 | Kentucky State Championships | Clay | (United States) Frank Parker | 5–6, 2–6, 1–6. |
| 2. | Loss | 11‑Jun‑1933 | Cotton States Championships | Grass | (United States) Bryan Grant | 3–6, 11–9, 7–5, 0–6, 1–6 |
| 3. | Win | 18-Jun-1933 | Memphis Invitation | ? | (United States) William Hughes | 4–6, 6–2, 4–6, 10–8, 7–5. |
| 4. | Win | 20-Aug-1933 | Mid-Dixie Championships | Grass | (United States) Hudson Russell Hamm | 6–2, 6–3, 0–6, 6–1. |
| 5. | Win | 27-Aug-1933 | Middle Atlantic States Championships | Grass | (United States) Hudson Russell Hamm | 8–6, 6–4, 6–3. |
| 6. | Win | 9-Apr-1934 | Beausoleil Championships | Clay | (Switzerland) Max Ellmer | 6–4, 6–4, 7–5. |
| 3. | Loss | 25‑Mar‑1934 | Italian Riviera Championships | Clay | (France) Jean Lesueur | 8–6, 3–6, 2–6, 3–6. |
| 7. | Win | 10-Apr-1934 | Macomber Cup | Clay | (Italy) Valentino Taroni | 6–3, 6–4, 11–9 |
| 4. | Loss | 29‑Apr‑1934 | Rappalo International | Clay | (Italy) Giovanni Palmieri | 3–6, 5–7. |
| 5. | Loss | 1-Jul-1934 | Kentucky State Championships | Clay | (United States) Frank Parker | 5–7, 2–6, 1–6. |
| 6. | Loss | 27‑Jul‑1934 | Genoa International | Clay | (Italy) Giovanni Palmieri | 4–6, 5–7, 6–3, 6–3, 6–3. |
| 7. | Loss | 4‑Feb‑1935 | Cannes Gallia Club Championship | Clay | (France) Antoine Gentien | 6–2, 4–6, 6–8, 3–6. |
| 8. | Loss | 11-Feb-1935 | Cannes Carlton Club Championship | Clay | (France) Antoine Gentien | 4–6, 2–6, 2–6. |
| 8. | Win | 17-Feb-1935 | South of France Championships | Clay | (Switzerland) Max Ellmer | 6–2, 3–6, 6–1, 6–4 |
| 9. | Loss | 10-Mar-1935 | Riviera Championships | Clay | (Czechoslovakia) Josef Caska | 6–3, 4–6, 2–6, 2–6. |
| 9. | Win | 24-Apr-1935 | Italian International Championships | Clay | (Italy) Giovanni Palmieri | 6–3, 10–8, 9–7 |
| 10. | Win | 14-Jul-1935 | Longwood Bowl | Grass | (United States) Norcross Sheldon Tilney | 6–1, 6–1, 6–4. |
| 10. | Loss | 29-Jul-1935 | Seabright Invitation | Grass | (United States) Gregory Mangin | 8–6, 4–6, 6–3, 2–6, 5–7. |
