= Beausoleil Championships =

Beausoleil Championships Championnats Beausoleil

Defunct tennis tournament
- Tour: French Riviera Circuit
- Founded: 1921; 104 years ago
- Abolished: 1970; 55 years ago
- Location: Monte Carlo, Monaco
- Venue: La Festa Country Club; Monte Carlo Country Club
- Surface: Clay

The Beausoleil Championships also known as the Beausoleil Cup or Monte Carlo Third Meeting or Monte Carlo Easter Tournament was a men's and women's international clay court tennis tournament founded in 1910. The tournament was played at the La Festa Country Club, Hyères, France as part of the French Riviera Circuit. It was played annually until 1970 when it was discontinued.

== History ==
The first Beausoleil Championships were played between 18 and 30 March 1921 at the La Festa Country Club, Monte Carlo, Monaco. In 1929 the La Festa Country Club changed its name to the Monte Carlo Country Club. It was staged annually until 1970 when it was discontinued.

The first winner of the men's singles title was England's Jack Hillyard. The first winner of the women's singles was the French international Suzanne Lenglen. The finals men's singles champion was France's Georges Goven, and the final women's singles champion was Hungary's Katalin Borka.

== Finals ==
=== Men's singles ===
(Incomplete Roll)

Year	Champions	Runners-up	Score
1921	(United Kingdom) Jack Montagu Hillyard	(Switzerland) Charles Aeschlimann	6–3, 6–2, 3–6, 4–6, 6–2
1922	(Switzerland) Charles Aeschlimann	(France) Alain Gerbault	4–6, 6–4, 6–3, 6–4
1923	(United Kingdom) Brame Hillyard	(Switzerland) Charles Aeschlimann	8–6, 6–8, 6–0, 8–6
1924	(Switzerland) Charles Aeschlimann (2)	(United Kingdom) Brame Hillyard	6–2, 7–5, 4–6, 3–6, 6–3
1925	(Canada) Henry Mayes	(United Kingdom) Brame Hillyard	6–1, 4–6, 6–3, 6–1
1926	(Italy) Umberto De Morpurgo	(United Kingdom) Brame Hillyard	6–4, 6–4, 6–2
1927	(Denmark) Erik Worm	(Switzerland) Charles Aeschlimann	6–4, 6–1, 6–4
1928	(France) René Lacoste	(Canada) Henry Mayes	5–7, 2–6, 7–5, 6–2, 8–6
1929	(Denmark) Erik Worm (2)	(United States) Wilbur Coen	6–2, 6–2, 5–7, 6–3
1930	(United States) Bill Tilden II	(France) Jean Lesueur	6–1, 6–3, 6–3
1931	(Japan) Jiro Sato	(France) Marcel Bernard	6–4, 6–2, 6–2
1932	(France) Benny Berthet	(Republic of Ireland) George Lyttleton Rogers	4–6, 6–1, 1–6, 6–4, 6–4
1933	(Japan) Jiro Sato (2)	(Japan) Ryosuke Nunoi	0–6, 6–4, 4–6, 6–3, 6–4
1934	(United States) Wilmer Moore Hines	(Switzerland) Max Ellmer	6–4, 6–4, 7–5
1935	(Australia) Jack Crawford	(Australia) Vivian McGrath	3-1 sets
1936	(Italy) Valentino Taroni	(France) Paul Féret	6–2, 5–7, 8–6, 2–6, 7–5
1937	(Austria) Adam Baworowski	(France) Marcel Bernard	6–2, 3–6, 5–7, 7–5, 6–3
1938	(France) Bernard Destremau	(France) Jacques Jamain	6–4, 6–2, 6–1
1939	(France) Paul Féret	(France) Bernard Destremau	6–1, 6–3, 8–6
1942	(France) Yvon Petra	(France) Robert Abdesselam	6–4, 1–6, 10–8
1943/1945	Not held (due to world war two)		
1946	(France) Yvon Petra (2)	(France) Raphaël Patorni	6–0, 6–2
1947	(France) Yvon Petra (3)	(Italy) Gianni Cucelli	3–6, 6–4, 6–2, 6–1
1948	(United States) Budge Patty	(United States) Fred Kovaleski	1–6, 6–4, 6–4, 6–1
1951	(Egypt) Jaroslav Drobný	(France) Jean Borotra	6–4, 6–4, 6–1
1957	(Belgium) Jacques Brichant	(Hungary) István Gulyás	6–1, 6–4, 6–2
1961	(Italy) Nicola Pietrangeli	(Socialist Federal Republic of Yugoslavia) Boro Jovanović	6–4, 6–4
↓ Open era ↓
1969	(France) Georges Goven	(France) François Jauffret	7–5, 7–5, 6–3
1970	(France) Georges Goven (2)	(France) Daniel Contet	5–7, 6–2, 6–3, 6–4

=== Women's singles ===
(Incomplete Roll)

Year	Champions	Runners-up	Score
1921	(France) Suzanne Lenglen	(United Kingdom) Phyllis Satterthwaite	6–1, 6–0
1922	(France) Suzanne Lenglen (2)	(United States) Eleanor Goss	6–0, 6–0
1923	(Spain) Lilí Álvarez	(United Kingdom) Phyllis Satterthwaite	6–3, 7–5
1924	(United Kingdom) Phyllis Howkins Covell	(Spain) Lilí Álvarez	5–7, 6–3, 6–1
1925	(United Kingdom) Phyllis Satterthwaite	(United Kingdom) Domini Elliadi Crosfield	6–1, 6–4
1926	(Spain) Lilí Álvarez (2)	(United Kingdom) Phyllis Satterthwaite	w.o.
1927	(Spain) Lilí Álvarez (3)	(United Kingdom) Phyllis Satterthwaite	6–0, 6–2
1928	(Spain) Lilí Álvarez (4)	(United Kingdom) Phyllis Satterthwaite	6–2, 7–5
1929	(France) Simone Passermard Mathieu	(France) Sylvia Jung Lafaurie	6–3, 1–6, 6–4
1930	(Spain) Lilí Álvarez (5)	(Belgium) Josane Sigart	3–6, 6–2, 7–5
1931	(Germany) Cilly Aussem	(Spain) Lilí Álvarez	6–1, 6–4
1932	(Switzerland) Lolette Payot	(France) Simone Passermard Mathieu	5–7, 6–4, 6–2
1933	(France) Sylvie Jung Henrotin	(Germany) Cilly Aussem	6–2, 8–10, 6–3
1934	(France) Sylvie Jung Henrotin (2)	(United States) Dorothy Andrus Burke	6–1, 6–1
1935	(France) Simone Passermard Mathieu (2)	(Spain) Lilí Álvarez	6–4, 6–1
1936	(France) Simone Passermard Mathieu (3)	(France) Edith Belliard	6–4, 6–1
1937	(Luxembourg) Alice Weiwers	(France) Colette Rosambert Boegner	8–6, 6–1
1938	(France) Simone Passermard Mathieu (4)	(Luxembourg) Alice Weiwers	6–4, 6–0
1939	(France) Simone Passermard Mathieu (5)	(United Kingdom) Iris Hutchings	6–0, 6–0
1942	(Luxembourg) Alice Weiwers (2)	(France) Aimée Charpenel	6–2, 6–3
1943/1945	Not held (due to world war two)		
1951	(United Kingdom) Angela Mortimer	(United States) Althea Gibson	7–5, 6–3
1954	(United Kingdom) Shirley Bloomer	(United Kingdom) Joan Curry	8–6, 6–0
↓ Open era ↓
1969	(United States) Peaches Bartkowicz	(Czechoslovakia) Vlasta Vopičková	6–0, 6–3
1970	(Hungary) Katalin Borka	(Netherlands) Marijke Schaar	6–4, 6–2
