= 1938 French Championships – Women's singles =

Women's singles
- 1938 French Championships

Final
- Champion: (France) Simonne Mathieu
- Runner-up: (France) Nelly Adamson
- Score: 6–0, 6–3

Details
- Seeds: 8

Events
Singles	men	women
Doubles	men	women
← 1937 ·	French Championships	· 1939 →

First-seeded Simonne Mathieu defeated Nelly Adamson 6–0, 6–3 in the final to win the women's singles tennis title at the 1938 French Championships. Hilde Sperling was the three-time defending champion, but did not compete this year.

== Seeds ==
The seeded players are listed below. Simonne Mathieu is the champion; others show the round in which they were eliminated.

1. (France) Simonne Mathieu (champion)
2. (Australia) Nancye Wynne Bolton (third round)
3. (France) Sylvie Henrotin (quarterfinals)
4. (United Kingdom) Valerie Scott (second round)
5. (France) Arlette Halff (semifinals)
6. (Australia) Nell Hall Hopman (third round)
7. (Netherlands) Madzy Rollin Couquerque (semifinals)
8. (Czechoslovakia) Esther Hein-Mueller (second round)

== Draw ==
=== Key ===
- Q = Qualifier
- WC = Wild card
- LL = Lucky loser
- r = Retired

=== Finals ===
Quarterfinals
1	(France) Simonne Mathieu	6	6
(Australia) Dorothy Stevenson	4	0
(France) Suzanne Pannetier	6	4	3
5	(France) Arlette Halff	2	6	6
(France) Nelly Adamson	6	6
3	(France) Sylvie Henrotin	2	2
7	(Netherlands) Madzy Rollin Couquerque	6	6
(France) Jacqueline Goldschmidt	2	1

Semifinals
1	(France) Simonne Mathieu	6	6
5	(France) Arlette Halff	1	1
(France) Nelly Adamson	6	6
7	(Netherlands) Madzy Rollin Couquerque	2	4

Finals
1	(France) Simonne Mathieu	6	6
(France) Nelly Adamson	0	3

=== Earlier rounds ===
==== Section 1 ====
First round

Second round
1	(France) Mathieu	6	6
(France) Simon	0	1
(France) De St. Ferreol
(Denmark) Behrens
8	(Czechoslovakia) Hein-Mueller
(France) Barbier
(Australia) Stevenson	6	3	6
(Germany) Enger	2	6	2

Third round
1	(France) Mathieu
(France) De St. Ferreol
(France) Barbier	3	4
(Australia) Stevenson	6	6

Quarterfinals
1	(France) Mathieu	6	6
(Australia) Stevenson	4	0

==== Section 2 ====
First round
(France) Varin	1	6	4
(Luxembourg) Weiwers	6	0	6
(France) Belliard	4	3
(United Kingdom) Jarvis	6	6

Second round
4	(United Kingdom) Scott	5	3
(France) Pannetier	7	6
(France) Iribarne	3	5
(Kingdom of Yugoslavia) Kovac	6	7
5	(France) Halff
(Australia) Coyne
(Luxembourg) Weiwers	6	6
(United Kingdom) Jarvis	2	2

Third round
(France) Pannetier	6	6
(Kingdom of Yugoslavia) Kovac	1	4
5	(France) Halff	7	6
(Luxembourg) Weiwers	5	4

Quarterfinals
(France) Pannetier	6	4	3
5	(France) Halff	2	6	6

==== Section 3 ====
First round
(France) Adamson	7	6
(France) Horner	5	4
(United Kingdom) Saunders-Taylor	4	6	6
(France) Lebailly	6	4	3
(France) Morel-Deville	1	2
(United States) Andrus	6	6

Second round
(France) Adamson	6	6
(United Kingdom) Saunders-Taylor	2	1
(United States) Andrus	1	2
6	(Australia) Hopman	6	6
(France) Kleinadel	6	4	6
(France) Adamoff	1	6	2
(France) Mellerio	6	0	2
3	(France) Henrotin	3	6	6

Third round
(France) Adamson	6	6
6	(Australia) Hopman	4	1
(France) Kleinadel	2	2
3	(France) Henrotin	6	6

Quarterfinals
(France) Adamson	6	6
3	(France) Henrotin	2	2

==== Section 4 ====
First round

Second round
(France) Row
(United Kingdom) Whitmarsh
7	(Netherlands) Couquerque	6	6
(France) St. Omer Roy	0	3
(France) Goldschmidt	6	6
(France) Wyns-Speranza	0	0
(Sweden) Forsell	0	1
2	(Australia) Wynne	6	6

Third round
(United Kingdom) Whitmarsh	3	1
7	(Netherlands) Couquerque	6	6
(France) Goldschmidt	6	6
2	(Australia) Wynne	0	3

Quarterfinals
7	(Netherlands) Couquerque	6	6
(France) Goldschmidt	2	1

Preceded by 1938 Australian Championships – Women's singles	Grand Slam women's singles	Succeeded by 1938 Wimbledon Championships – Women's singles
