= Jadwiga Jędrzejowska =

Polish tennis player (1912–1980)

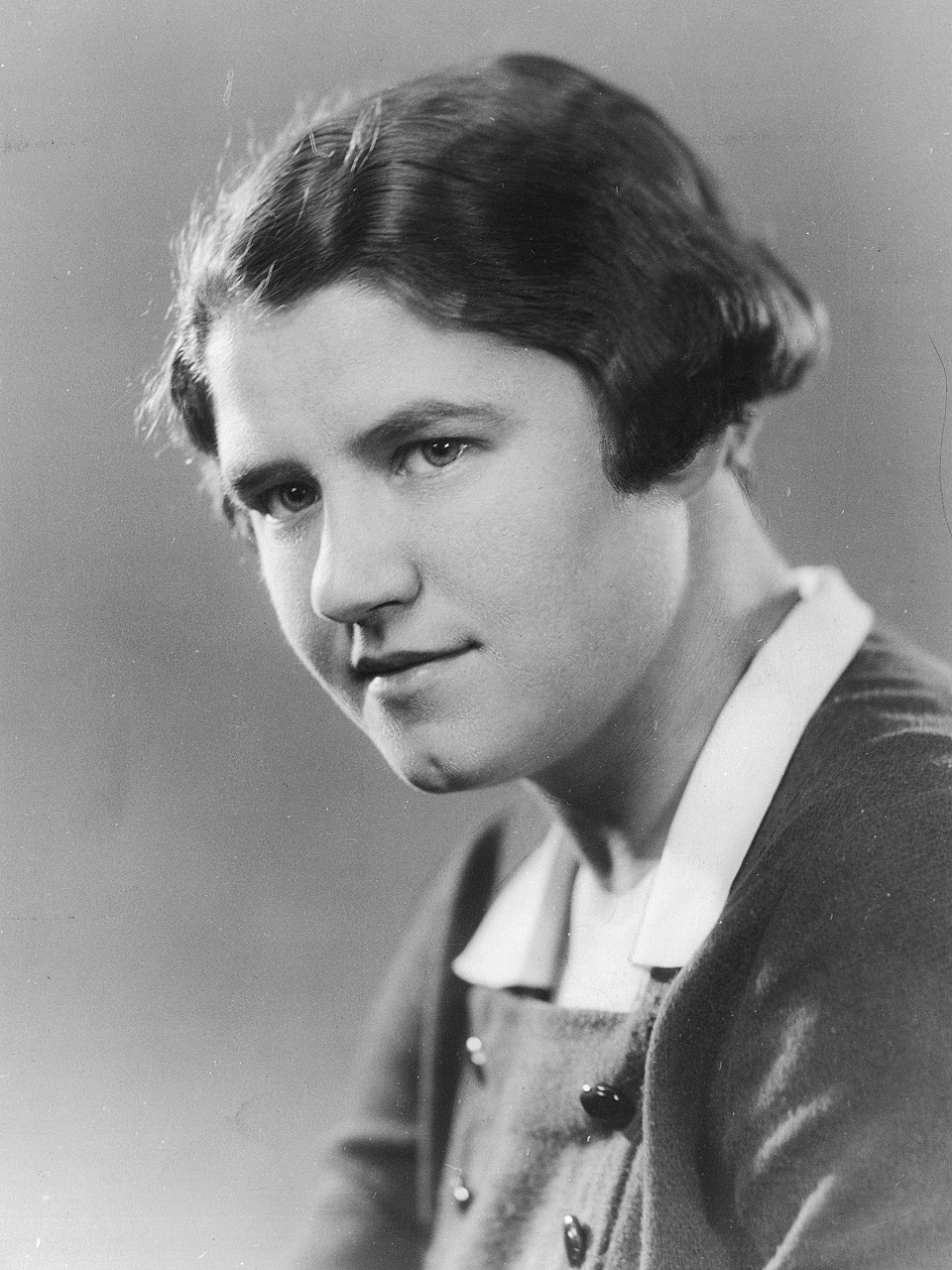
- Jędrzejowska in 1933.
- Country (sports): Poland
- Born: 15 October 1912 Kraków, Austria-Hungary
- Died: 28 February 1980 (aged 67) Katowice, Poland
- Plays: Right-handed

Singles
- Career record: 317–96 (76.8%)
- Career titles: 68
- Highest ranking: No. 3 (1937) (Note: According to A. Wallis Myers of The Daily Telegraph.)

Grand Slam singles results
- French Open: F (1939)
- Wimbledon: F (1937)
- US Open: F (1937)

Grand Slam doubles results
- French Open: W (1939)
- Wimbledon: QF (1933, 1935–37, 1947)
- US Open: F (1938)

Grand Slam mixed doubles results
- French Open: F (1947)
- Wimbledon: SF (1935, 1937)

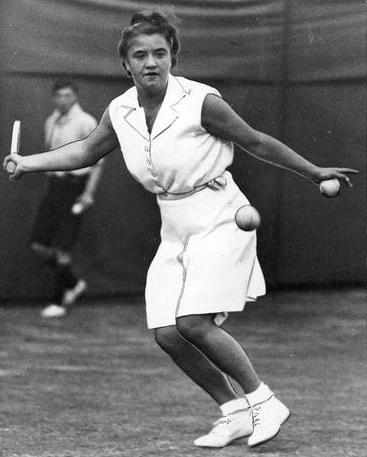
Jędrzejowska at Chiswick in 1938

Jadwiga "Jed" Jędrzejowska (Polish pronunciation: [jadˈviɡa jɛndʐɛˈjɔfska]; 15 October 1912 – 28 February 1980) was a Polish tennis player who had her main achievements during the second half of the 1930s. Because her name was difficult to pronounce for many people who did not speak Polish, she was often called by the nicknames "Jed" or "Ja-Ja". Honoured Master of Sport of Poland.

== Career ==
Jędrzejowska was a multiple Polish champion, with 65 singles and doubles titles nationally. A baseline player with a strong forehand, she reached the singles final of a Grand Slam tournament on three occasions. In 1937 she lost in three sets to Dorothy Round in the Wimbledon final and at the U.S. Championships later that year she was defeated in the final by Anita Lizana. In 1939 she was a runner-up at the French Championships, losing in the final to Simonne Mathieu in straight sets.

In women's doubles, Jędrzejowska won the 1939 French Championships with Mathieu, defeating Alice Florian and Hella Kovac in the final in two sets. Three years earlier Jędrzejowska's and Susan Noel were runners-up at the French Championships, losing the final to Mathieu and Billie Yorke. At the 1938 U.S. Championships Jędrzejowska and Mathieu lost the final to the American pair Alice Marble and Sarah Palfrey Cooke. In the mixed doubles final at the 1947 French Championships, Jędrzejowska and Cristea Caralulis lost to Eric Sturgess and Sheila Summers without winning a game. At the age of 44, Jędrzejowska reached the women's doubles quarterfinals of the 1957 French Championships with partner Pilar Barril.

She won four consecutive singles titles at the London Championships from 1936 to 1939. Jędrzejowska won the singles event at the Kent Championships in 1937 and 1938 and additionally won the singles title at the Irish Championships (1932), Austrian Championships (1934) and Welsh Championships (1932, 1935 and 1936). In 1953 at the age of 41 she won the first Polish Indoor Championships played on indoor clay courts in Gliwice.

According to A. Wallis Myers and John Olliff of The Daily Telegraph and The Daily Mail, Jędrzejowska was ranked in the world top 10 from 1936 through 1939 (no rankings issued from 1940 through 1945), reaching a career high of world No. 3 in 1937.

== Personal life ==
Jędrzejowska married Alfred Gallert in 1947.

== Grand Slam finals ==
=== Singles: 3 (3 runners-up) ===
Result	Year	Championship	Surface	Opponent	Score
Loss	1937	Wimbledon Championships	Grass	(United Kingdom) Dorothy Round	2–6, 6–2, 5–7
Loss	1937	U.S. Championships	Grass	(Chile) Anita Lizana	4–6, 2–6
Loss	1939	French Championships	Clay	(France) Simonne Mathieu	3–6, 6–8

=== Doubles: 3 (1 title, 2 runners-up) ===
Result	Year	Championship	Surface	Partner	Opponents	Score
Loss	1936	French Championships	Clay	(United Kingdom) Susan Noel	(France) Simonne Mathieu (United Kingdom) Billie Yorke	6–2, 4–6, 4–6
Loss	1938	US Championships	Grass	(France) Simonne Mathieu	(United States) Sarah Palfrey (United States) Alice Marble	8–6, 4–6, 3–6
Win	1939	French Championships	Clay	(France) Simonne Mathieu	(Socialist Federal Republic of Yugoslavia) Alice Florian (Socialist Federal Republic of Yugoslavia) Hella Kovac	7–5, 7–5

=== Mixed doubles: 1 (1 runner-up) ===
Result	Year	Championship	Surface	Partner	Opponents	Score
Loss	1947	French Championships	Clay	(Romania) Cristea Caralulis	(South Africa) Sheila Piercey (South Africa) Eric Sturgess	0–6, 0–6

== Grand Slam singles tournament timeline ==
Key
W	F	SF	QF	#R	RR	Q#	DNQ	A	NH

(W) winner; (F) finalist; (SF) semifinalist; (QF) quarterfinalist; (#R) rounds 4, 3, 2, 1; (RR) round-robin stage; (Q#) qualification round; (DNQ) did not qualify; (A) absent; (NH) not held; (SR) strike rate (events won / competed); (W–L) win–loss record.

Tournament	1931	1932	1933	1934	1935	1936	1937	1938	1939	1940	1941–1944	1945	1946^{1}	1947^{1}	1948	1949-1956	1957	1958	1959	1960	1961	1962	Career SR
Australia	A	A	A	A	A	A	A	A	A	A	NH	NH	A	A	A	A	A	A	A	A	A	A	0 / 0
France	2R	A	1R	3R	A	3R	SF	A	F	NH	R	A	3R	3R	1R	A	2R	A	1R	A	A	A	0 / 11
Wimbledon	1R	3R	3R	4R	QF	SF	F	QF	QF	NH	NH	NH	A	2R	A	A	A	A	A	A	A	A	0 / 10
United States	A	A	A	A	A	A	F	QF	A	A	A	A	A	A	A	A	A	A	A	A	A	1R	0 / 3
SR	0 / 2	0 / 1	0 / 2	0 / 2	0 / 1	0 / 2	0 / 3	0 / 2	0 / 2	0 / 0	0 / 0	0 / 0	0 / 1	0 / 2	0 / 1	0 / 0	0 / 1	0 / 0	0 / 1	0 / 0	0 / 0	0 / 1	0 / 24

R = tournament restricted to French nationals and held under German occupation.

^{1}In 1946 and 1947, the French Championships were held after Wimbledon.

== See also ==
- Ignacy Tłoczyński
- Performance timelines for all female tennis players since 1978 who reached at least one Grand Slam final
