= Klára Somogyi =

Hungarian tennis player

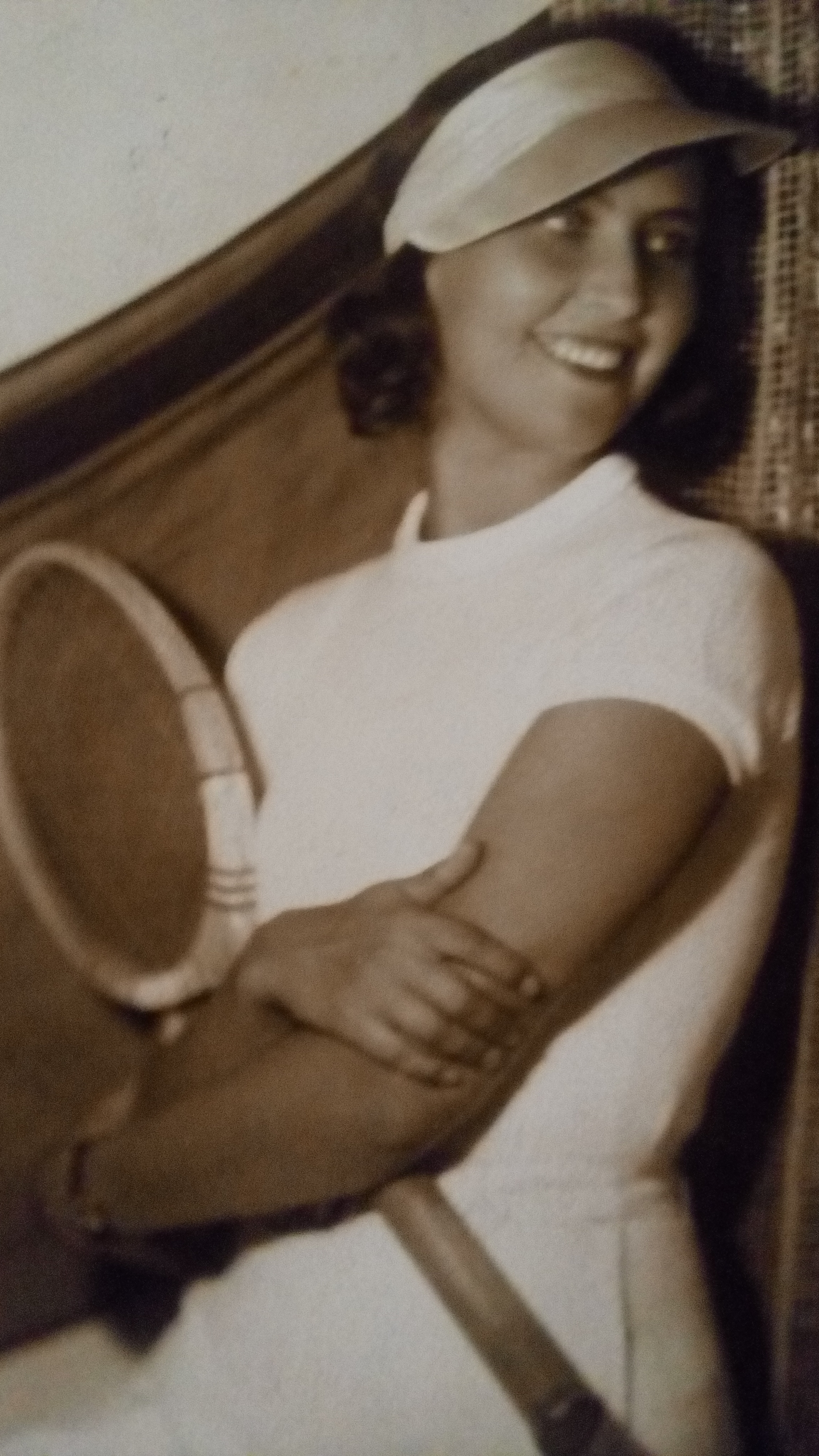
- Full name: Klára Somogyi Szilágy-Somlyói
- Country (sports): Hungary
- Born: 1913; Arad, Austria-Hungary
- Died: 1996 (aged 82–83); Budapest, Hungary
- Turned pro: 1928 (amateur tour)
- Retired: 1945

Singles

Grand Slam singles results
- French Open: 2R (1939)
- Wimbledon: 3R (1939)

Doubles

Grand Slam doubles results
- French Open: 1R (1939)
- Wimbledon: QF (1939)

Mixed doubles

Grand Slam mixed doubles results
- French Open: QF (1939)
- Wimbledon: 2R (1939)

Klára Hensch (née Somogyi Szilágy-Somlyói, Hungarian: [ˈklaːrɒ ˈʃomoɟi ˈhɛnʃ]; 1913–1996) was a Hungarian tennis player in the World War II era. She represented Hungary in many international team matches. She reached the quarterfinal of the Wimbledon doubles event in 1939.

== Early life and family ==
Somogyi was born in 1913 in Arad. Her great-great-grandfather was cavalry captain in the Anglo-German legion of the Napoleonic Wars. Her great-grandfather József Somogyi (1807–1872) was a Honvéd Major from Marosvásárhely who fought in the Hungarian Revolution of 1848. Her father was Jenő Somogyi, an architect, who designed the Traian bridge in Arad. She fell in love with tennis at the age of fifteen. She studied in a German school in Sibiu (Szeben). At the age of seventeen she finished third in the second class mixed doubles at Cluj. Meanwhile, the Treaty of Trianon had transferred her region from Hungary to Romania, and she had to move to Budapest in 1938 to further compete for Hungary.

== Tennis career ==
In 1928 she found early success in the Romanian national championships where she finished second in doubles and third in mixed doubles. By 1932 she was already a two-time Romanian national champion. She clinched two more consecutive national mixed doubles titles up to 1937 with the same pair Arnulf Schmidt. After moving to Hungary she was crowned Hungarian National Champion as well in singles in 1938 and 1939 and doubles in 1939 and 1944. Her first international challenge came at the Central Europe Tennis Team Cup, which Hungary grabbed after an overwhelming victory over Italy. Somogyi had an easy match against Wally San Donnino.

On international individual level her breakthrough came in the 1937 edition of the German International Championships doubles, a semifinal accomplishment alongside Vittoria Tonolli, which was only spoiled by her opponents Madzy Rollin Couquerque and Hilde Krahwinkel preventing her the final. At the same tournament she was a mixed doubles quarterfinalist with Hungarian champion partner Ottó Szigeti. In early 1939 she reached the final of the German Covered Courts tournament in Bremen only being defeated by Gracyn Wheeler, the same occurred in the doubles where Wheeler and Hamel triumphed over Somogyi and Kovács. The same year she reached the mixed quarterfinals of the Queen's Club Championships teaming with Szigeti but lost to Henner Henkel and Wheeler. Next week at the Wimbledon Championships they were dropped out in the early second round by Cam Malfroy and Betty Nuthall. Although Somogyi found success in the Ladies' doubles where she and Wheeler lost only to first-seeded Sarah Fabyan and Alice Marble. A month later in the German International Championships in Hamburg she was a doubles quarterfinalist and a singles semifinalist. In the latter she met Krahwinkel and lost in straight sets. In August she competed in Båstad where she came short against Wheeler in the singles championship match but were victorious in the doubles partnering her. Still in August she played a final in Ostend losing to eventual champion to Madzy Rollin Couquerque in three struggling sets. Somogyi got tired for the third set after Rollin Couquerque broke her baseline gameplan with a smart netplay and forced her to run from corner to corner. She got less lucky in the doubles only reaching the semifinal stage.

== Personal life ==
She married and had a daughter named Judit. During the Siege of Budapest the family hid in the humid basement to survive the air strikes. Her joints got cold, and as a result of the relating health issues including arthritis, she was unable to play any more and subsequently abandoned tennis. Because of her alleged German affiliation like participating in the wartime German Championships and having German language knowledge she was labelled as "untrustworthy", a term used to people who had some sort of German connection by the government of the Hungarian People's Republic. Thus she couldn't find a job and so started a small weaving business. She moved to Velence and got involved in self-supporting agriculture. After her husband's death she went back to Hegyvidék and lived there for the rest of her life.

== Works cited ==
=== Online media ===
- "Női bajnokaink" [Women's Champions]. mtsztenisz.hu (in Hungarian). Budapest, Hungary: Magyar Tenisz Szövetség (Hungarian Tennis Association). 17 December 2012.
- "In memoriam Arnulf Cucu Schmidt – posesor a 35 de titluri nationale" [In memoriam Cucu Arnulf Schmidt – owner of 35 national titles]. tenisdecamp.ro (in Romanian). Mediand Soft SRL.
- "Klara Somogyi". The Championships, Wimbledon. All England Lawn Tennis and Croquet Club.
- A.I. (12 March 2013). "Százéves lenne az egykori teniszcsillag" [Birth centenary of deceased tennis legend]. hegyvidekujsag.eu (in Hungarian). Budapest, Hungary: Hegyvidék council. Archived from the original on 4 March 2016.
- "Balatonkiliti gyermekei" [Children of Balatonkiliti]. kilitiek.hu (in Hungarian). Siófok, Hungary: Balatonkiliti council. Archived from the original on 19 September 2017.

=== Periodicals ===
- "Tennis". Leidsch Dagblad (in Dutch). 78 (23, 732). Leiden, Netherlands: B.W. Menkhorst: 10. 7 August 1937.
- De Lang, ed. (9 August 1937). "De Internationale Kampioenschappen van Duitschland" [German International Championships] (PDF). Nieuwsblad van het Noorden (in Dutch). 50 (185). Groningen, Netherlands: Joan Nieuwenhuis: 14.
- "Női teniszezőink 4:1 arányban legyőzték az olaszokat" [Our tennis player ladies defeated the Italians 4:1] (in Hungarian). Budapest, Hungary: Huszadik Század. June 1938.
- H. M. Planten, ed. (23 July 1939). "Mej. Couquerque geslagen in enkelspel" [Miss Couquerque beaten in singles] (PDF). Algemeen Handelsblad (in Dutch). 112 (36, 815). Amsterdam, Netherlands: Daniel Johannes von Balluseck: 12.
- H. M. Planten, ed. (23 July 1939). "Lawntennis in Zweden" [Lawn tennis in Sweden] (PDF). Algemeen Handelsblad (in Dutch). 112 (36, 825). Amsterdam, Netherlands: Daniel Johannes von Balluseck: 5.
- H. M. Planten, ed. (23 July 1939). "Twee successen van mej.Couquerque te Oostende" [Two successes for Couquerque in Ostend] (PDF). Algemeen Handelsblad (in Dutch). 112 (36, 831). Amsterdam, Netherlands: Daniel Johannes von Balluseck: 5.
- Béla Kehrling, ed. (22 August 1930). "A Kolozsvári A. C. nemzetközi versenye" [The International Tournament of the AC Cluj-Napoca] (PDF). Tennisz és Golf (in Hungarian). II (15). Budapest, Hungary: Bethlen Gábor Irod. és Nyomdai RT: 295.
- François Coty, ed. (23 January 1939). "Menzel bat Henkel á Brěme" [Menzel beat Henkel in Bremen]. Le Figaro (in French) (23). Paris, France: Dassault Group: 7. ISSN 0182-5852.
- "Bobby Riggs, Mrs, Fabyan Are Defeated" (PDF). Schenectady Gazette. Schenectady, New York, United States: Austin N. Liecty. 24 June 1939. ISSN 1050-0340.
