= Madzy Rollin Couquerque =

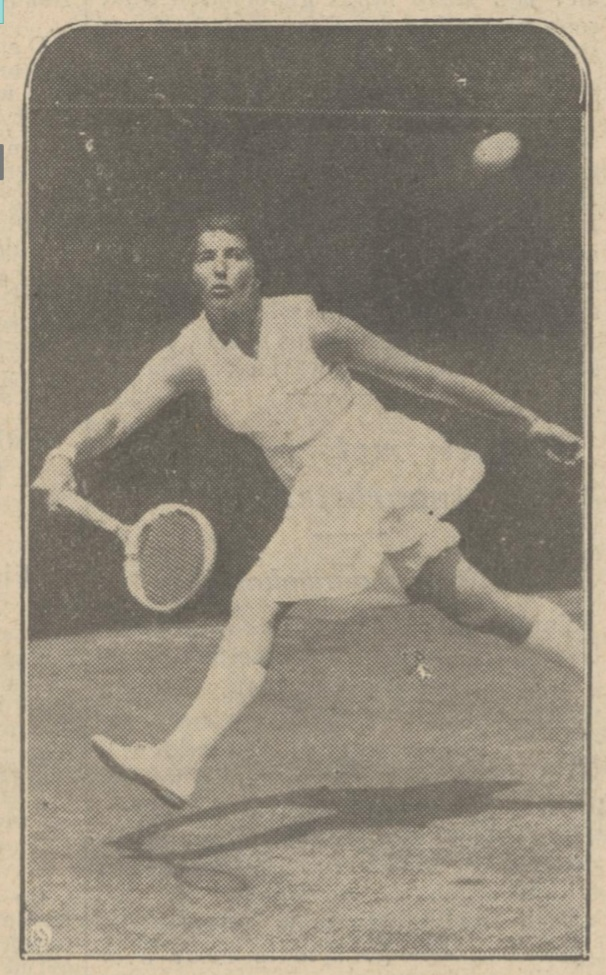
- Full name: Magdalena Ferdinanda Maria Rollin Couquerque
- Country (sports): Netherlands
- Born: 14 April 1903 The Hague, Netherlands
- Died: 16 July 1994 (aged 91) The Hague, Netherlands

Singles

Grand Slam singles results
- Australian Open: 1R (1956)
- French Open: SF (1938)
- Wimbledon: 4R (1937)

Doubles

Grand Slam doubles results
- Wimbledon: QF (1929)

Grand Slam mixed doubles results
- Wimbledon: 4R (1932, 1933, 1936)

Madzy Rollin Couquerque (14 April 1903 – 16 July 1994) was a Dutch female hockey and tennis player who was active from the 1920s until the late 1950s. She won 40 national tennis titles and made 37 appearances in the Dutch national hockey team.

== Early life and sports career ==
Madzy Rollin Couquerque was born on 14 April 1903 in The Hague, Netherlands. Her father Louis Marie Rollin Couquerque was a jurist. Her mother died in 1918. After she returned from a boarding school in Bloemendaal in 1921, she started a bookkeeping job at an insurance company which provided her with the income that allowed her to pursue her sports career.

=== Tennis ===
Rollin Couquerque became Dutch singles tennis champion 14 times between 1927 and 1947. In 1959, aged 56, she reached her last singles final at the Dutch Championships, which she lost to Mientje Vletter-Tettelaar, who was half her age. In addition, she won 14 doubles titles and 12 mixed doubles titles, making a total of 40 national championship titles during her career.

Her better singles results in a Grand Slam tournament were achieved at the French Championships. At the 1928 Championships, she reached the quarterfinals, losing to eventual champion and world no.1 Helen Wills. In 1935, she reached the quarterfinals, losing to Margaret Scriven. At the 1936 Championships, she lost in the third round to Marie-Louise Horn. Her best result came at the 1938 Championships when, seeded seventh and at age 35, she made it to the semifinals, losing to Nelly Adamson.

Between 1928 and 1951, she participated in 15 Wimbledon Championships. Her best result in the singles event was reaching the fourth round in 1937, losing to fifth-seeded Alice Marble. In the doubles, she reached the quarterfinal in 1929 partnering compatriot Kea Bouman. With Joop Knottenbelt, she reached the fourth round of the mixed doubles in 1932 and equaled this result with Henk Timmer in 1933 and 1936.

In 1929, she won the singles title at the Spanish International Championships, played at the Real Club de Tenis Barcelona, after a three-sets victory in the final against Ida Adamoff.

She took part in the 1956 Australian Championships, losing in the first round to eventual champion Mary Carter.

=== Hockey ===
In winter months, she played field hockey for HOC (HHV-ODIS Combinatie) in The Hague. (Note: In 1951 HOC merged with GHC de Gazellen to form HGC (HOC-Gazellen Combinatie).) She made the first team in 1921 which became national champion that year. HOC, with Rollin Couquerque, remained the undefeated national champion until 1935. Rollin Couquerque made her first appearance in the Dutch national team in 1926, playing against Belgium in Brussels as a leftback. She made 37 national appearances and captained the team in the 1930s until the outbreak of the World War II interrupted her hockey activities.
