= Margit Madarász =

Hungarian tennis player

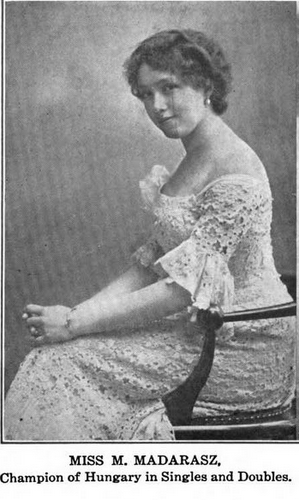
Margit Madarász, from a 1908 publication.

Margit Madarász (23 August 1884 — 15 February 1959) was a Hungarian tennis player and the first Hungarian woman to play tennis internationally.

== Early life ==
Margit Laura Madarász was born in Budapest, the daughter of artist Gyula Madarász and Margit Mária Ligeti. Her maternal grandfather was artist Antal Ligeti. Her half-sisters Katalin Cséry and Sarolta Cséry also played tennis.

== Career ==
Madarász was the first Hungarian woman to play tennis internationally. She began competing in tennis matches with the Budapest Lawn Tennis Club in 1901. She was the Hungarian national champion in 1903 and 1904. She won the German women's singles championship in 1907 and 1908 in Hamburg. She also played at Monte Carlo in 1907 and 1908. "On several occasions, the Hungarian lady, Mlle. de Madarasz, showed up well with her powerful service," one 1908 report explained, "and it was mainly from lack of stamina that this young player failed to do even better." She qualified for and was scheduled to play in the 1908 Summer Olympics in London, but did not compete. Instead, she retired from tennis when she married that year.

== Personal life ==
Madarász married twice: first, in 1908, to Pál Kunz (who died in 1915) and second, in 1916, to Károly Thuróczy. Later in life, she was known as a social hostess in Budapest before World War II. She was widowed again in 1947, and she died in 1959, aged 74.
