= Arlette Halff =

French tennis player (1908–2007)

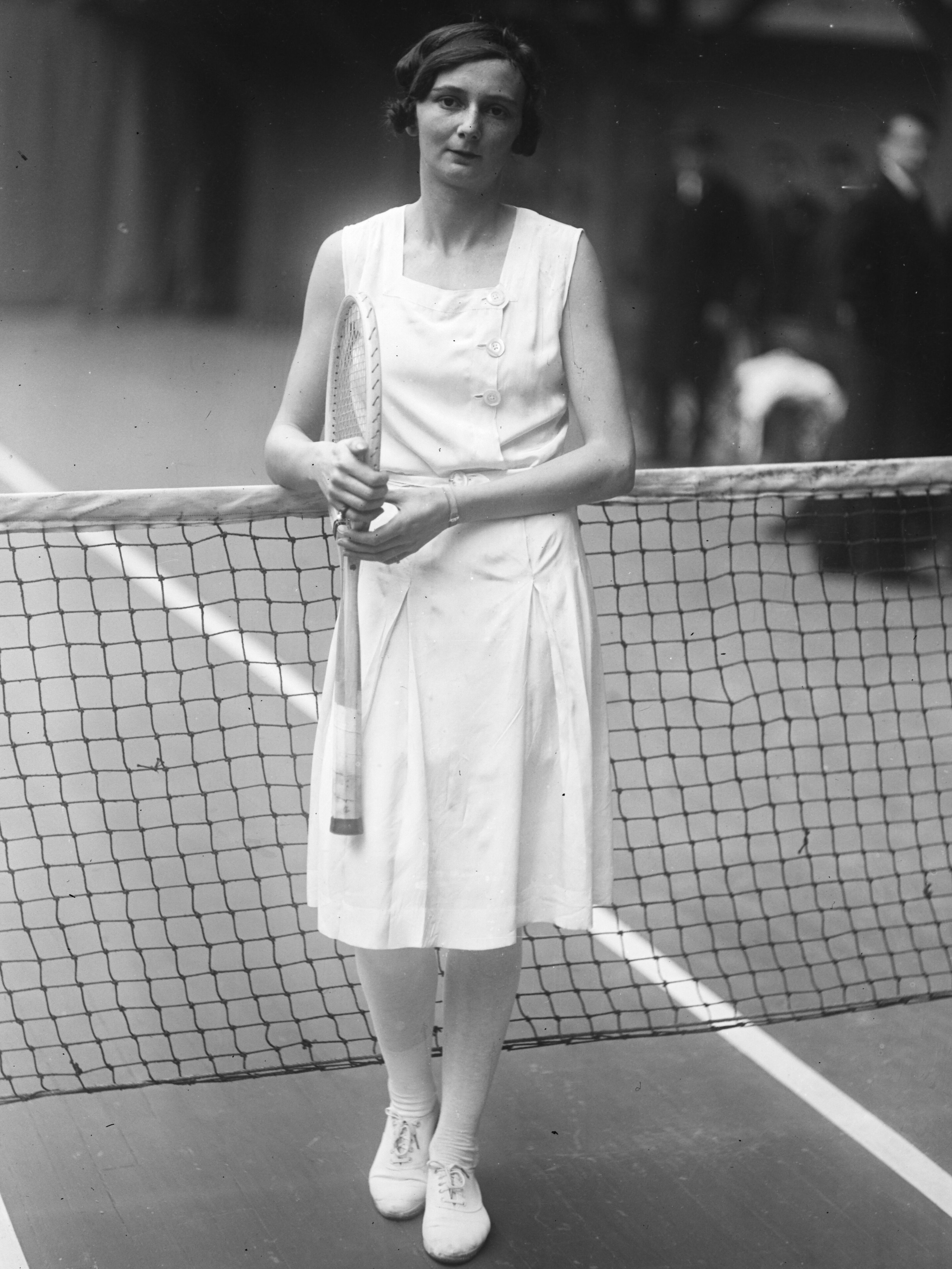
- Neufeld in 1929
- Full name: Arlette Jeannie Neufeld
- Country (sports): France
- Born: 16 April 1908; Paris, France
- Died: 1 June 2007 (aged 99); Neuilly-sur-Seine, France

Singles

Grand Slam singles results
- French Open: SF (1938)
- Wimbledon: 4R (1931, 1939)

Doubles

Grand Slam doubles results
- French Open: F (1938)
- Wimbledon: 1R (1931)

Grand Slam mixed doubles results
- French Open: QF (1956)
- Wimbledon: 2R (1931, 1939)

Arlette Halff (née Neufeld; 16 April 1908 – 1 June 2007) was a French tennis player who was active between the 1930s and the early 1960s.

Halff participated in the singles event of the Wimbledon Championships in 1931 and 1939 and reached the fourth round on both occasions. She also took part in the French Championships, reaching the semi-final in the 1938 singles event which she lost in straight sets to first-seeded and eventual champion Simonne Mathieu. During the same championships, she achieved her best result at a Grand Slam tournament when she and her partner, compatriot Nelly Landry, finished runners-up in the doubles competition against Simonne Mathieu and Billie Yorke.

She was a singles runner-up at the French Covered Court Championships in 1931, 1938, and 1950.

== Grand Slam tournament finals ==
=== Doubles: (1 runner-up) ===
Result	Year	Championship	Surface	Partner	Opponents	Score
Loss	1938	French Championships	Clay	(France) Nelly Landry	(France) Simonne Mathieu (United Kingdom) Billie Yorke	3–6, 3–6
