= Marie-Louise Horn =

German tennis player (1912–1991)

Marie-Luise Horn
- Country (sports): Germany
- Born: 15 March 1912; Wiesbaden, Germany
- Died: 26 July 1991 (aged 79); Wiesbaden, Germany

Singles
- Career record: 132-66 (66.7%)
- Career titles: 23
- Highest ranking: No. 8 (1932, A. Wallis Myers)

Grand Slam singles results
- French Open: SF (1936)
- Wimbledon: QF (1936)
- US Open: 3R (1937)

Doubles

Grand Slam doubles results
- French Open: QF (1935, 1937)
- Wimbledon: 2R (1933–35, 1937)
- US Open: QF (1937)

Grand Slam mixed doubles results
- French Open: F (1937)
- Wimbledon: 2R (1932–34, 1936)
- US Open: QF (1937)

Marie-Luise "Marlies" Horn (15 March 1912 – 26 July 1991) was a German tennis player who was active in the 1930s.

== Personal ==
Horn was born at Wiesbaden on 15 March 1912.

She married businessman Joachim Hinrich (1908–1990) at Wiesbaden, on 15 April 1939. Horn died at her home town on 26 July 1991, aged 79.

== Career ==
=== Early years ===
In 1927, she joined the local tennis and hockey club. From 1928 to 1930, Horn took part at the German junior championships where she lost to Edith Sander twice in the finals.

=== Grand Slam tournaments ===
She played at the French Championships from 1931 to 1937. In singles, her best result was in 1936 when she lost to second-seeded Simonne Mathieu in the semifinals. In mixed doubles, she reached the final alongside Roland Journu in 1937 where they were defeated by Mathieu and Yvon Petra.

Horn participated at Wimbledon from 1932 to 1937, reaching the quarterfinals in singles in 1936. She was the top player on the German national ranking in 1936 and 1937. In 1932 and 1937, she was ranked world No. 8 by British journalist A. Wallis Myers. In 1937, Horn went on a world tour together with the best German male players Gottfried von Cramm, Henner Henkel and coach Heinrich Kleinschroth which led them to the United States and Japan. In Japan, she won the national mixed-doubles title with Ryuki Miki.

At the 1937 U.S. Championships, she reached the third round in singles where she lost to Dorothy Bundy. In doubles, she teamed with Anita Lizana; they were defeated in the quarterfinals by Sarah Palfrey and Alice Marble. In mixed doubles, she played with von Cramm and also reached the quarterfinals. After their stay at Japan, the men continued their trip towards Australia, and Horn returned to Germany from Manila.

== Grand Slam finals ==
=== Mixed doubles (1 runner-up) ===
Result	Year	Championship	Surface	Partner	Opponents	Score
Loss	1937	French Championships	Clay	(France) Roland Journu	(France) Simonne Mathieu (France) Yvon Petra	5–7, 5–7
