= Hella Strecker =

Yugoslav-Austrian tennis player

- Country (sports): Kingdom of Yugoslavia; Austria
- Born: 10 November 1911; Vienna, Austria-Hungary
- Died: 1999; Cannes, France
- Turned pro: 1932 (amateur tour)
- Retired: 1959

Singles
- Career record: 84–71
- Career titles: 26

Grand Slam singles results
- French Open: 3R (1938, 1939)
- Wimbledon: 3R (1939, 1953)

Doubles

Grand Slam doubles results
- French Open: F (1939)
- Wimbledon: 1R (1938, 1939)

Hella Strecker born Hella Kovac (10 November 1911 – 1999) was a Yugoslav then later Austrian tennis player from Vienna active during the 1930s to 1950s. She was a losing finalist in the women's doubles at the 1939 French Championships partnering Alice Florian. At the Wimbledon Championships which she played six times, she reached the third round of the singles events in 1939 and 1953.

== Career ==
Hella Kovac was born on 10 November 1911 in Vienna, Austria-Hungary. During the 1930s until 1940 she represented Yugoslavia on the international tennis circuit. After her marriage in 1941 marriage she represented Austria, and continued playing until late 1950s.

She played and won her first tournament in 1935 at Zagreb against Vlasta Gostisa. In major tournament singles events, she reached the third round of the French Championships twice in 1936 and 1938. At the Wimbledon Championships she reached the third round two times, in 1939 and 1953.

Her other career singles highlights include winning the Yugoslavian International Championships three times, (1935–37) the Prince Hertier Cup (1938), the Durham County Lawn Tennis Championships (1938), the Italian Riviera Championships (1940), the Closed Croatian Championships (1940), Alassio International (1940), the Genoa International (1940), Coupe des Alpes, Kitzbühel (1949), the Gallia Lawn Tennis Club Tournament, Cannes (1951), Cimiez Club Tournament (1951), the Austrian International Championships three times ((1951–52, 1954),

She was also a losing finalist at the Wiesbaden International (1936), Bordighera Championship (1938), German International Championships (1939), Polish International Championships (1939), Slovakian International Championships (1941). She won her final singles title at Munich in 1953 against Margot Dittmeyer, and played her final singles tournament the same year at Linz.

== Personal life ==
She married Anton Strecker on 31 May 1941.
