= 1939 International Lawn Tennis Challenge Europe Zone =

International tennis competition

Details
- Duration: 5 May 1939 – 30 July 1939
- Teams: 20
- Categories: 1939 Europe Zone; 1939 America Zone

Champion
- Winning nation: Yugoslavia; Qualified for: 1939 Int'l Lawn Tennis; Challenge Inter-Zonal Final

The Europe Zone was one of the two regional zones of the 1939 International Lawn Tennis Challenge.

20 teams entered the Europe Zone, with the winner going on to compete in the Inter-Zonal Final against the winner of the America Zone. Yugoslavia defeated Germany in the final, and went on to face Australia in the Inter-Zonal Final.

== Draw ==
First Round; 5–7 May
Great Britain
bye
New Zealand
bye
France
bye
Taiwan
bye
Sweden
bye
Denmark
bye
Germany	5
Switzerland	0
Poland	4
Netherlands	1
Romania	2
Hungary	3
Yugoslavia	5
Ireland	0
bye
Italy
bye
Monaco
bye
Belgium
bye
India
bye
Norway
bye
Czechoslovakia

Second Round; 11–21 May
Brighton, England (clay)
Great Britain	3
New Zealand	2
Paris, France (clay)
France	4
Taiwan	1
Stockholm, Sweden (clay)
Sweden	4
Denmark	1
Warsaw, Poland
Germany	3
Poland	2
Budapest, Hungary
Hungary	1
Yugoslavia	4
Naples, Italy (clay)
Italy	3
Monaco	0
Brussels, Belgium
Belgium	3
India	2
Norway	w/o
Czechoslovakia (Note: The tie between Norway and Czechoslovakia was abandoned due to the German invasion and partition of Czechoslovakia in March 1939.)

Quarterfinals; 25–29 May
Wimbledon, England (grass)
Great Britain	3
France	2
Berlin, Germany (clay)
Sweden	1
Germany	4
Milan, Italy (clay)
Yugoslavia	3
Italy	2
Brussels, Belgium (clay)
Belgium	5
Norway	0

Semifinals; 2–5 June
Berlin, Germany (clay)
Great Britain	0
Germany	5
Zagreb, Yugoslavia
Yugoslavia	3
Belgium	2

Final; 28–30 July
Zagreb, Yugoslavia
Germany	2
Yugoslavia	3

== First round ==
=== Germany vs. Switzerland ===
Germany
5
Vienna, Germany
5–7 May 1939
Clay

Switzerland
0

			1	2	3	4	5
1	(Germany) (Switzerland)	Roderich Menzel; Boris Maneff	6; 8	6; 3	5; 7	6; 2	6; 3
2	(Germany) (Switzerland)	Henner Henkel; Hector Fisher	6; 2	2; 6	6; 1	6; 3
3	(Germany) (Switzerland)	Henner Henkel / Georg von Metaxa; Hector Fisher / Boris Maneff	6; 2	6; 2	6; 4
4	(Germany) (Switzerland)	Henner Henkel; Boris Maneff	6; 1	6; 2	6; 2
5	(Germany) (Switzerland)	Roderich Menzel; Jost Spitzer	8; 6	6; 4	6; 3

=== Poland vs. Netherlands ===
Poland
4
Warsaw, Poland
5–7 May 1939

Netherlands
1

			1	2	3	4	5
1	(Poland) (Netherlands)	Adam Baworowski; Hans van Swol	9; 7	6; 3	6; 0
2	(Poland) (Netherlands)	Ignacy Tłoczyński; Tod Hughan	6; 0	6; 2	6; 1
3	(Poland) (Netherlands)	Józef Hebda / Ignacy Tłoczyński; Tod Hughan / Hans van Swol	4; 6	4; 6	10; 12
4	(Poland) (Netherlands)	Ignacy Tłoczyński; Hans van Swol	13; 11	4; 6	6; 3	6; 2
5	(Poland) (Netherlands)	Adam Baworowski; Tod Hughan	0; 6	6; 3	6; 4	6; 2

=== Romania vs. Hungary ===
Romania
2
Bucharest, Romania
5–7 May 1939
Clay

Hungary
3

			1	2	3	4	5
1	(Romania) (Hungary)	Arnulf Schmidt; Emil Gábori	6; 4	6; 4	4; 6	2; 6	0; 1	retired
2	(Romania) (Hungary)	Cristea Caralulis; József Asbóth	6; 1	3; 6	9; 7	8; 10	4; 6
3	(Romania) (Hungary)	Cristea Caralulis / Arnulf Schmidt; Mihály Csikós / György Dallos	6; 8	4; 6	6; 2	6; 2	6; 4
4	(Romania) (Hungary)	Cristea Caralulis; Emil Gábori	3; 6	6; 2	6; 3	7; 5
5	(Romania) (Hungary)	Arnulf Schmidt; József Asbóth	6; 1	2; 6	3; 6	8; 6	3; 6

=== Yugoslavia vs. Ireland ===
Yugoslavia
5
Zagreb, Yugoslavia
5–7 May 1939

Ireland
0

			1	2	3	4	5
1	(Kingdom of Yugoslavia) (Republic of Ireland)	Dragutin Mitić; George Lyttleton-Rogers	7; 5	6; 2	3; 6	3; 6	6; 3
2	(Kingdom of Yugoslavia) (Republic of Ireland)	Franjo Punčec; Raymond Egan	6; 2	6; 0	6; 4
3	(Kingdom of Yugoslavia) (Republic of Ireland)	Dragutin Mitić / Franjo Punčec; Raymond Egan / George Lyttleton-Rogers	6; 1	6; 4	6; 2
4	(Kingdom of Yugoslavia) (Republic of Ireland)	Franjo Punčec; George Lyttleton-Rogers	6; 4	6; 2	6; 4
5	(Kingdom of Yugoslavia) (Republic of Ireland)	Dragutin Mitić; Raymond Egan	7; 5	6; 3	6; 2

== Second round ==
=== Great Britain vs. New Zealand ===
Great Britain
3
Sussex Lawn Tennis Club, Brighton, England
11–13 May 1939
Clay

New Zealand
2

			1	2	3	4	5
1	(United Kingdom) (New Zealand)	Ronald Shayes; Cam Malfroy	6; 4	2; 6	2; 6	7; 5	3; 6
2	(United Kingdom) (New Zealand)	Charles Hare; Alistair Dewar-Brown	6; 3	6; 4	6; 3
3	(United Kingdom) (New Zealand)	Charles Hare / Frank Wilde; Dennis Coombe / Cam Malfroy	3; 6	6; 2	3; 6	2; 6
4	(United Kingdom) (New Zealand)	Ronald Shayes; Alistair Dewar-Brown	6; 3	6; 4	7; 5
5	(United Kingdom) (New Zealand)	Charles Hare; Cam Malfroy	7; 5	6; 4	6; 4

=== France vs. China ===
France
4
Stade Roland Garros, Paris, France
18–20 May 1939
Clay

Taiwan
1

			1	2	3	4	5
1	(France) (Taiwan)	Bernard Destremau; Kho Sin-Kie	5; 7	6; 3	1; 6	7; 5	6; 0
2	(France) (Taiwan)	Christian Boussus; Choy Wai-Chuen	1; 6	6; 4	6; 4	6; 1
3	(France) (Taiwan)	Pierre Pellizza / Yvon Petra; Choy Wai-Chuen / Kho Sin-Kie	6; 2	6; 0	6; 3
4	(France) (Taiwan)	Yvon Petra; Kho Sin-Kie	6; 2	7; 9	3; 6	4; 6
5	(France) (Taiwan)	Pierre Pellizza; Ho Jin	7; 5	4; 6	6; 2	6; 4

=== Sweden vs. Denmark ===
Sweden
4
Tennisstadion, Stockholm, Sweden
19–21 May 1939
Clay

Denmark
1

			1	2	3	4	5
1	(Sweden) (Denmark)	Morgan Hultman; Helge Plougmann	1; 6	0; 6	3; 6
2	(Sweden) (Denmark)	Kalle Schröder; Niels Holst	6; 4	6; 2	6; 3
3	(Sweden) (Denmark)	Nils Rohlsson / Kalle Schröder; Helge Plougmann / Alfred Wium	6; 1	8; 6	6; 0
4	(Sweden) (Denmark)	Kalle Schröder; Helge Plougmann	6; 1	6; 1	6; 1
5	(Sweden) (Denmark)	Morgan Hultman; Niels Holst	6; 1	6; 3	6; 1

=== Poland vs. Germany ===
Poland
2
Warsaw, Poland
19–21 May 1939

Germany
3

			1	2	3	4	5
1	(Poland) (Germany)	Adam Baworowski; Roderich Menzel	5; 7	3; 6	6; 2	6; 2	4; 6
2	(Poland) (Germany)	Ignacy Tłoczyński; Henner Henkel	6; 4	6; 8	6; 4	3; 6	6; 3
3	(Poland) (Germany)	Adam Baworowski / Józef Hebda; Henner Henkel / Georg von Metaxa	7; 5	4; 6	2; 6	2; 6
4	(Poland) (Germany)	Ignacy Tłoczyński; Roderich Menzel	2; 6	6; 1	5; 7	6; 2	9; 7
5	(Poland) (Germany)	Adam Baworowski; Henner Henkel	4; 6	2; 6	3; 6

=== Hungary vs. Yugoslavia ===
Hungary
1
Budapest, Hungary
12–14 May 1939

Yugoslavia
4

			1	2	3	4	5
1	(Hungary) (Kingdom of Yugoslavia)	Emil Gábori; Dragutin Mitić	3; 6	6; 0	6; 2	1; 6	1; 6
2	(Hungary) (Kingdom of Yugoslavia)	József Asbóth; Franjo Punčec	7; 5	4; 6	7; 5	11; 9
3	(Hungary) (Kingdom of Yugoslavia)	József Asbóth / Emil Gábori; Dragutin Mitić / Franjo Punčec	1; 6	6; 4	2; 6	5; 7
4	(Hungary) (Kingdom of Yugoslavia)	Emil Gábori; Franjo Punčec	1; 6	1; 6	4; 6
5	(Hungary) (Kingdom of Yugoslavia)	József Asbóth; Dragutin Mitić	7; 9	6; 2	8; 10	3; 6

=== Italy vs. Monaco ===
Italy
3
Naples, Italy
12–14 May 1939
Clay

Monaco
0

			1	2	3	4	5
1	(Italy) (Monaco)	Vanni Canepele; Aleco Noghès	6; 0	6; 3	6; 1
2	(Italy) (Monaco)	Giorgio de Stefani; Gaston Médécin	6; 1	6; 2	6; 2
3	(Italy) (Monaco)	Giovanni Cucelli / Gino Vido; Vladimir Landau / Aleco Noghès	6; 3	6; 1	6; 0
4	(Italy) (Monaco)	Giorgio de Stefani; Aleco Noghès						not played
5	(Italy) (Monaco)	Vanni Canepele; Gaston Médécin						not played

=== Belgium vs. India ===
Belgium
3
Brussels, Belgium
19–21 May 1939

India
2

			1	2	3	4	5
1	(Belgium) (India)	André Lacroix; Ghaus Mohammad Khan	6; 1	6; 3	5; 7	6; 0
2	(Belgium) (India)	Charles Naeyaert; Yaswanath-Rao Savur	6; 0	10; 8	1; 6	6; 3
3	(Belgium) (India)	Pierre Geelhand de Merxem / Jacques Van den Eynde; Ghaus Mohammad Khan / Yaswanath-Rao Savur	4; 6	4; 6	7; 5	4; 6
4	(Belgium) (India)	Charles Naeyaert; Ghaus Mohammad Khan	8; 10	2; 6	1; 6
5	(Belgium) (India)	André Lacroix; Yaswanath-Rao Savur	6; 2	6; 2	6; 4

== Quarterfinals ==
=== Great Britain vs. France ===
Great Britain
3
No. 1 Court, All England Club, Wimbledon, England
25–27 May 1939
Grass

France
2

			1	2	3	4	5
1	(United Kingdom) (France)	Charles Hare; Bernard Destremau	6; 2	6; 3	3; 6	14; 12
2	(United Kingdom) (France)	Ronald Shayes; Christian Boussus	2; 6	4; 6	0; 6
3	(United Kingdom) (France)	Charles Hare / Frank Wilde; Pierre Pellizza / Yvon Petra	6; 3	6; 3	3; 6	4; 6	6; 3
4	(United Kingdom) (France)	Ronald Shayes; Bernard Destremau	6; 3	4; 6	6; 4	7; 5
5	(United Kingdom) (France)	Laurie Shaffi; Christian Boussus	0; 6	2; 6	5; 7

=== Germany vs. Sweden ===
Germany
4
Rot-Weiss-Stadion, Berlin, Germany
27–29 May 1939
Clay

Sweden
1

			1	2	3	4	5
1	(Germany) (Sweden)	Roderich Menzel; Morgan Hultman	6; 0	6; 2	6; 1
2	(Germany) (Sweden)	Henner Henkel; Kalle Schröder	5; 7	3; 6	6; 2	8; 6	6; 3
3	(Germany) (Sweden)	Henner Henkel / Georg von Metaxa; Nils Rohlsson / Kalle Schröder	2; 6	6; 1	3; 6	3; 6
4	(Germany) (Sweden)	Roderich Menzel; Kalle Schröder	2; 6	6; 3	6; 3	6; 3
5	(Germany) (Sweden)	Rolf Göpfert; Morgan Hultman	6; 2	6; 3	6; 3

=== Italy vs. Yugoslavia ===
Italy
2
Milan, Italy
26–28 May 1939
Clay

Yugoslavia
3

			1	2	3	4	5
1	(Italy) (Kingdom of Yugoslavia)	Vanni Canepele; Dragutin Mitić	6; 3	6; 3	7; 5
2	(Italy) (Kingdom of Yugoslavia)	Giorgio de Stefani; Franjo Punčec	4; 6	1; 6	5; 7
3	(Italy) (Kingdom of Yugoslavia)	Giovanni Cucelli / Valentino Taroni; Dragutin Mitić / Franjo Punčec	2; 6	2; 6	0; 6
4	(Italy) (Kingdom of Yugoslavia)	Giorgio de Stefani; Dragutin Mitić	6; 1	6; 4	4; 6	6; 3
5	(Italy) (Kingdom of Yugoslavia)	Vanni Canepele; Franjo Punčec	11; 13	1; 6	8; 6	3; 6

=== Belgium vs. Norway ===
Belgium
5
Brussels, Belgium
26–28 May 1939
Clay

Norway
0

			1	2	3	4	5
1	(Belgium) (Norway)	André Lacroix; Johan Haanes	6; 1	6; 4	6; 2
2	(Belgium) (Norway)	Charles Naeyaert; Sigurd Rinde	6; 1	6; 0	6; 0
3	(Belgium) (Norway)	Léopold de Borman / Pierre Geelhand de Merxem; Birger Andersen-Brem / Johan Haanes	6; 0	6; 1	5; 7	6; 2
4	(Belgium) (Norway)	Charles Naeyaert; Johan Haanes	6; 4	6; 1	6; 3
5	(Belgium) (Norway)	Pierre Geelhand de Merxem; Sigurd Rinde	6; 1	6; 0	6; 0

== Semifinals ==
=== Germany vs. Great Britain ===
Germany
5
Berlin, Germany
3–5 June 1939
Clay

Great Britain
0

			1	2	3	4	5
1	(Germany) (United Kingdom)	Roderich Menzel; Charles Hare	6; 0	6; 1				retired
2	(Germany) (United Kingdom)	Henner Henkel; Ronald Shayes	6; 2	6; 3	6; 1
3	(Germany) (United Kingdom)	Henner Henkel / Georg von Metaxa; Laurie Shaffi / Frank Wilde	6; 4	6; 2	6; 2
4	(Germany) (United Kingdom)	Roderich Menzel; Ronald Shayes	6; 1	6; 1	6; 0
5	(Germany) (United Kingdom)	Georg von Metaxa; Frank Wilde	3; 6	6; 0	6; 2	6; 3

=== Yugoslavia vs. Belgium ===
Yugoslavia
3
Zagreb, Yugoslavia
2–4 June 1939

Belgium
2

			1	2	3	4	5
1	(Kingdom of Yugoslavia) (Belgium)	Franjo Punčec; André Lacroix	1; 6	6; 3	6; 3	7; 5
2	(Kingdom of Yugoslavia) (Belgium)	Dragutin Mitić; Pierre Geelhand de Merxem	6; 1	6; 4	6; 1
3	(Kingdom of Yugoslavia) (Belgium)	Dragutin Mitić / Franjo Punčec; Léopold de Borman / André Lacroix	2; 6	2; 6	3; 6
4	(Kingdom of Yugoslavia) (Belgium)	Dragutin Mitić; André Lacroix	3; 6	2; 6	8; 6	2; 6
5	(Kingdom of Yugoslavia) (Belgium)	Franjo Punčec; Pierre Geelhand de Merxem	6; 3	8; 6	6; 3

== Final ==
=== Yugoslavia vs. Germany ===
Yugoslavia
3
A.T.K. Stadium, Zagreb, Yugoslavia
28–30 July 1939

Germany
2

			1	2	3	4	5
1	(Kingdom of Yugoslavia) (Germany)	Franjo Punčec; Rolf Göpfert	6; 3	6; 1	6; 0
2	(Kingdom of Yugoslavia) (Germany)	Dragutin Mitić; Henner Henkel	0; 6	1; 6	6; 4	4; 6
3	(Kingdom of Yugoslavia) (Germany)	Franjo Kukuljević / Franjo Punčec; Henner Henkel / Roderich Menzel	7; 9	6; 4	4; 6	6; 3	1; 4
4	(Kingdom of Yugoslavia) (Germany)	Dragutin Mitić; Rolf Göpfert	6; 1	6; 2	6; 3
5	(Kingdom of Yugoslavia) (Germany)	Franjo Punčec; Henner Henkel	10; 8	6; 3	6; 0
