= Scandinavian Indoor Championships =

Defunct tennis tournament
- Event name: Scandinavian Championships (1936-51); Scandinavian Covered Court Championships (1952-67); Scandinavian Open Indoor (1968-69); Scandinavian Indoor Tennis Championships (1970-73); Scandinavian Indoor Championships (1974-79)
- Founded: 1936
- Abolished: 1979
- Location: Copenhagen; Helsinki; Stockholm; Oslo
- Surface: Wood (indoor) 1936-69; Carpet (indoor) 1970-79

The Scandinavian Indoor Championships also known as the Scandinavian Covered Court Championships and the Scandinavian Indoor Open was a combined men's and women's tennis tournament held from 1936 through 1979.

== History ==
The tournament was created to celebrate the 30th anniversary of the Swedish Lawn Tennis Association and was first held on the indoor courts of the B-Hall in Stockholm. The location of the tournament alternated between the four Scandinavian capitals Copenhagen, Helsinki, Stockholm and Oslo and the event was usually held at the end of January or the beginning of February. The competitors were mainly European players. The tournament struggled in Open Era, the mixed doubles event was cancelled in 1971, and the championships were abolished in 1979.

== Champions ==
Year	Location					
Year	Location	Men's singles	Women's singles	Men's doubles	Women's doubles	Mixed doubles
1936	Stockholm	(Sweden) Kalle Schröder	(Denmark) Hilde Sperling	(France) Paul Feret (France) Jean Lesueur	(Denmark) Hilde Sperling (Denmark) Else Hollis	(Sweden) Gudrun Roberg (France) Jean Borotra
1937	Copenhagen	(Denmark) Anker Jacobsen	(Denmark) Hilde Sperling	(United Kingdom) Charles Hare (United Kingdom) Frank Wilde	(Denmark) Hilde Sperling (Denmark) Else Hollis	(United Kingdom) Mary Hardwick (United Kingdom) Charles Hare
1938	Helsinki	(Socialist Federal Republic of Yugoslavia) Franjo Punčec	(United Kingdom) Mary Hardwick	(Socialist Federal Republic of Yugoslavia) Josip Pallada (Socialist Federal Republic of Yugoslavia) Franjo Punčec	(United Kingdom) Mary Hardwick (United Kingdom) Joan Saunders	(United Kingdom) Joan Saunders (United Kingdom) Patrick Hughes
1939	Stockholm	(France) Henri Bolelli	(Denmark) Hilde Sperling	(France) Henri Bolelli (France) Pierre Pelizza	(Denmark) Hilde Sperling (Denmark) Else Hollis	(France) Le Bailly (France) Henri Bolelli
Not held in 1940–1947
1948	Copenhagen	(Sweden) Börje Fornstedt	(France) Nelly Landry	(Sweden) Börje Fornstedt (Sweden) Sven Davidson	(France) Nelly Landry (Finland) Thelma Salo	(France) Nelly Landry (France) Pierre Pelizza
1949	Stockholm	(Denmark) Kurt Nielsen	(Denmark) Hilde Sperling	(Sweden) Lennart Bergelin (Sweden) Torsten Johansson	(United Kingdom) Betty Hilton (United Kingdom) Jean Quertier	(Denmark) Hilde Sperling (Sweden) Nils Rohlsson
1950	Copenhagen	(Sweden) Sven Davidson	(Denmark) Hilde Sperling	(Sweden) Torsten Johansson (Sweden) Nils Rohlsson	(Sweden) Birgit Gullbrandsson (Denmark) Hilde Sperling	(Sweden) Birgit Gullbrandsson (Sweden) Sven Davidson
1951	Helsinki	(Sweden) Torsten Johansson	(Sweden) Birgit Sandén	(Sweden) Torsten Johansson (Sweden) Nils Rohlsson	(United Kingdom) Kay Tucky (United Kingdom) Susan Partridge	(Sweden) Birgit Sandén (Sweden) Torsten Johansson
1952	Stockholm	(Denmark) Kurt Nielsen	(United Kingdom) Jean Quertier	(Denmark) Kurt Nielsen (Sweden) Torsten Johansson	(United Kingdom) Jean Quertier (United Kingdom) Susan Partridge	(United Kingdom) Jean Quertier (United Kingdom) Gerald Oakley
1953	Copenhagen	(Denmark) Kurt Nielsen	(United Kingdom) Angela Mortimer	(Denmark) Kurt Nielsen (Denmark) Torben Ulrich	(United Kingdom) Angela Mortimer (United Kingdom) Jean Quertier	(United Kingdom) Jean Quertier (United Kingdom) Geoffrey Paish
1954	Helsinki	(Sweden) Sven Davidson	(United Kingdom) Angela Mortimer	(Sweden) Sven Davidson (Sweden) Nils Rohlsson	(United Kingdom) Angela Mortimer (United Kingdom) Anne Shilcock	(United Kingdom) Angela Mortimer (United Kingdom) Gerald Oakley
1955	Oslo	(Denmark) Kurt Nielsen	(United Kingdom) Angela Mortimer	(Italy) Giuseppe Merlo (Italy) Giorgio Fachini	(United Kingdom) Angela Mortimer (United Kingdom) Anne Shilcock	(United Kingdom) Angela Mortimer (United Kingdom) Gerald Oakley
1956	Stockholm	(United States) Budge Patty	(United Kingdom) Angela Mortimer	(United States) Budge Patty (United States) Hugh Stewart	(United Kingdom) Angela Mortimer (United Kingdom) Anne Shilcock	(United States) Althea Gibson (Sweden) Sven Davidson
1957	Copenhagen	(Sweden) Sven Davidson	(United Kingdom) Anne Shilcock	(Sweden) Sven Davidson (Sweden) Ulf Schmidt	(Australia) Thelma Long (France) Ginette Bucaille	(Sweden) Gudrun Rosin (Sweden) Percy Rosberg
1958	Helsinki	(Denmark) Kurt Nielsen	(West Germany) Erika Vollmer	(Denmark) Kurt Nielsen (Denmark) Jørgen Ulrich	(United Kingdom) Shirley Bloomer (United Kingdom) Ann Haydon	(United Kingdom) Shirley Bloomer (United Kingdom) Alan Mills
1959	Stockholm	(Sweden) Sven Davidson	(United Kingdom) Angela Mortimer	(Denmark) Kurt Nielsen (Denmark) Jørgen Ulrich	(United Kingdom) Angela Mortimer (United Kingdom) Christine Truman	(United Kingdom) Christine Truman (United Kingdom) Mike Hann
1960	Copenhagen	(Sweden) Jan-Erik Lundqvist	(United Kingdom) Ann Haydon	(United Kingdom) Billy Knight (United Kingdom) Tony Pickard	(United Kingdom) Angela Mortimer (United Kingdom) Ann Haydon	(United Kingdom) Angela Mortimer (United Kingdom) Billy Knight
1961	Helsinki	(Sweden) Ulf Schmidt	(United Kingdom) Angela Mortimer	(Spain) Manuel Santana (Spain) E. Soriano	(United Kingdom) Angela Mortimer (United Kingdom) Deidre Catt	(United Kingdom) Angela Mortimer (United Kingdom) Bobby Wilson
1962	Oslo	(Sweden) Ulf Schmidt	(United Kingdom) Ann Haydon	(United Kingdom) Bobby Wilson (United Kingdom) Alan Mills	(United Kingdom) Ann Haydon (United Kingdom) Deidre Catt	(United Kingdom) Ann Haydon (United Kingdom) Bobby Wilson
1963	Stockholm	(Sweden) Jan-Erik Lundqvist	(United Kingdom) Ann Haydon-Jones	(Denmark) Jan Leschly (Denmark) Jørgen Ulrich	(United Kingdom) Ann Haydon-Jones (United Kingdom) Deidre Catt	(United Kingdom) Ann Haydon-Jones (United Kingdom) Mike Hann
1964	Copenhagen	(Denmark) Jørgen Ulrich	(United Kingdom) Christine Truman	(Denmark) Jan Leschly (Denmark) Jørgen Ulrich	(West Germany) Helga Niessen (West Germany) Heidi Schildknecht	(Sweden) Gudrun Rosin (Finland) Raino Nyyssönen
1965	Helsinki	(United Kingdom) Roger Taylor	(United Kingdom) Elisabeth Starkie	(United Kingdom) Roger Taylor (United Kingdom) Bobby Wilson	(Soviet Union) Anna Dmitrijeva (Sweden) Gudrun Rosin	(Soviet Union) Anna Dmitrijeva (Soviet Union) Toomas Leius
1966	Oslo	(United Kingdom) Bobby Wilson	(West Germany) Helga Niessen	(France) Daniel Contet (France) Patrice Beust	(United Kingdom) Elisabeth Starkie (United Kingdom) Winnie Shaw	(United Kingdom) Winnie Shaw (United Kingdom) C.R. Stillwell
1967	Stockholm	(Sweden) Jan-Erik Lundqvist	(United Kingdom) Ann Haydon-Jones	(Soviet Union) Vladirmir Korotkov (West Germany) Hans-Joachim Plötz	(United Kingdom) Ann Haydon-Jones (United Kingdom) Winnie Shaw	(United Kingdom) Ann Haydon-Jones (Soviet Union) Alex Metreveli
1968	Copenhagen	(Denmark) Jan Leschly	(United Kingdom) Virginia Wade	(Sweden) Ove Bengtson (Sweden) Kenneth Andersson	(United Kingdom) Virginia Wade (United Kingdom) Joyce Williams	(Soviet Union) Anna Dmitrijeva (Soviet Union) Sergej Likhatjev
1969	Helsinki	(Sweden) Ove Bengtson	(Sweden) Christina Sandberg	(Denmark) Carl-Edvard Hedelund (Sweden) Martin Carlstein	(United Kingdom) Christine Janes (United Kingdom) Joyce Williams	(United Kingdom) Joyce Williams (United Kingdom) Graham Stilwell
1970	Oslo	(Sweden) Jan-Erik Lundqvist	(United Kingdom) Joyce Williams	(United Kingdom) John Clifton (United Kingdom) Paul Hutchins	(United Kingdom) Christine Truman (United Kingdom) Joyce Williams	(Sweden) Ingrid Bentzer (Sweden) Håkan Zahr
1971	Stockholm	(Czechoslovakia) Jiří Hřebec	(Sweden) Christina Sandberg	(Sweden) Ove Bengtson (Sweden) Hans Nerell	(Sweden) Christina Sandberg (Sweden) Ingrid Bentzer	Not held
1972	Copenhagen	(Denmark) Jan Leschly	(United Kingdom) Winnie Shaw	(Czechoslovakia) František Pála (Czechoslovakia) Jiří Hřebec	(United Kingdom) Joyce Williams (United Kingdom) Winnie Shaw	Not held
1973	Helsinki	(Sweden) Björn Borg	(Sweden) Ingrid Bentzer	(Sweden) Björn Borg (Sweden) Rolf Norberg	(Sweden) Ingrid Bentzer (Sweden) Mimmi Wikstedt	Not held
1974	Oslo	(Sweden) Björn Borg	(United Kingdom) Lesley Charles	(Sweden) Björn Borg (Sweden) Kjell Johansson	(Israel) P. Peosachow (United Kingdom) Sue Mappin	Not held
1975	Stockholm	(Czechoslovakia) Jan Šimbera	(Norway) Ellen Grindvold	(Poland) Nowicki (Poland) Jacek Niedźwiedzki	(Sweden) Helena Anliot (Sweden) Margareta Forsgårdh	Not held
1976	Copenhagen	(Denmark) Lars Elvstrøm	(United Kingdom) Linda Mottram	(France) Jean-François Caujolle (United Kingdom) John Feaver	(Denmark) Dorte Ekner (Denmark) Mari-Ann Klougart	Not held
1977	Helsinki	(United Kingdom) Mark Cox	(United Kingdom) Jackie Fayter	(Austria) Hans Kary (Czechoslovakia) Jiří Hřebec	(Sweden) Margareta Forsgårdh (Sweden) Elisabeth Ekblom	Not held
1979	Norway	(Sweden) Tenny Svensson	(Sweden) Lena Sandin	(Sweden) Tenny Svensson (Sweden) Douglas Palm	(Sweden) L. Jacobsen (Sweden) Lena Sandin	Not held

== Past finals ==
=== Men's singles ===
Year	Champion	Runner-up	Score
1936	(Sweden) Kalle Schröder	(France) Jean Borotra	6–2, 6–3, 4–6, 4–6, 7–5
1937	(Denmark) Anker Jacobsen	(United Kingdom) Charles Hare	7–5, 6–2, 6–3
1938	(Socialist Federal Republic of Yugoslavia) Franjo Punčec	(Socialist Federal Republic of Yugoslavia) Josip Palada	7–5, 2–6, 1–6, 6–4, 6–2
1939	(France) Henri Bolelli	(Nazi Germany) Henner Henkel	4–6, 6–4, 6–1, 6–4
1940-47	No competition		
1948	(Sweden) Borje Fornstedt	(Denmark) Kurt Nielsen	1–6, 7–5, 6–1, 6–2
1949	(Denmark) Kurt Nielsen	(United States) Budge Patty	6–3, 5–7, 16–14, 6–3
1950	(Sweden) Sven Davidson	(Sweden) Torsten Johansson	14–12, 6–4, 6–1
1951	(Sweden) Torsten Johansson	(Denmark) Kurt Nielsen	23–21, 6–3, 9–7
1952	(Denmark) Kurt Nielsen	(Sweden) Torsten Johansson	12–10, 6–1, 6–4
1953	(Denmark) Kurt Nielsen	(United States) Art Larsen	6–3, 4–6, 6–4, 6–4
1954	(Sweden) Sven Davidson	(Poland) Władysław Skonecki	6–2, 8–6, 6–4
1955	(Denmark) Kurt Nielsen	(Sweden) Ulf Schmidt	14–12, 7–5, 6–3
1956	(United States) Budge Patty	(Sweden) Sven Davidson	6–4, 13–11, 6–2
1957	(Sweden) Sven Davidson	(United States) Budge Patty	6–3, 6–1, 6–3
1958	(Denmark) Kurt Nielsen	(Sweden) Jan-Erik Lundqvist	6–3, 6–4, 6–2
1959	(Sweden) Sven Davidson	(Denmark) Kurt Nielsen	6–1, 6–2, 2–6, 6–3
1960	(Sweden) Jan-Erik Lundqvist	(Denmark) Torben Ulrich	6–3, 6–4, 5–7, 1–6, 7–5
1961	(Sweden) Ulf Schmidt	(United Kingdom) Bobby Wilson	6–4, 6–3, 7–9, 8–6
1962	(Sweden) Ulf Schmidt	(Denmark) Jørgen Ulrich	6–3, 6–4, 7–9, 6–4
1963	(Sweden) Jan-Erik Lundqvist	(Sweden) Ulf Schmidt	6–4, 8–6, 1–6, 6–3
1964	(Denmark) Jørgen Ulrich	(Denmark) Torben Ulrich	6–2, 6–2, 3–6, 6–3
1965	(United Kingdom) Roger Taylor	(Soviet Union) Toomas Leius	6–0, 11–13, 9–11, 16–14, 6–1
1966	(United Kingdom) Bobby Wilson	(Denmark) Torben Ulrich	12–10, 3–6, 8–6, 5–7, 6–3
1967	(Sweden) Jan-Erik Lundqvist	(Sweden) Bo Holmström	6–2, 7–5, 6–4
1968	(Denmark) Jan Leschly	(Soviet Union) Alex Metreveli	4–6, 12–10, 6–3, 6–4
1969	(Sweden) Ove Bengtson	(United Kingdom) Gerald Battrick	6–3, 6–1, 4–6, 6–4
1970	(Sweden) Jan-Erik Lundqvist	(Sweden) Bengt Aaberg	6–4, 6–3, 6–2
1971	(Czechoslovakia) Jiří Hřebec	(Finland) Pekka Säilä	11–9, 6–4, 6–2
1972	(Denmark) Jan Leschly	(South Africa) Raymond Moore	6–1, 11–9, 6–3
1973	(Sweden) Björn Borg	(Poland) Jacek Niedźwiedzki	8–6, 5–7, 4–6, 6–3, 6–1
1974	(Sweden) Björn Borg	(South Africa) Raymond Moore	2–6, 6–4, 6–4, 6–1
1975	(Czechoslovakia) Jan Šimbera	(Sweden) Ove Bengtson	6–1, 3–6, 6–3
1976	(Denmark) Lars Elvstrøm	(France) Jean-François Caujolle	6–4, 4–6, 6–4
1977	(United Kingdom) Mark Cox	(Sweden) Kjell Johansson	6–3, 6–3
1979	(Sweden) Tenny Svensson	(Sweden) Stefan Simonsson	6–2, 7–6

== Event names ==
- Scandinavian Championships (1936–51)
- Scandinavian Covered Court Championships (1952–67, 77)
- Scandinavian Open Indoor (1968–69)
- Scandinavian Indoor Tennis Championships (1970–73)
- Scandinavian Indoor Championships (1974–76, 78-79)

== See also ==
- History of tennis
- Norwegian International Championships
- Category:National and multi-national tennis tournaments
