= Morgan Hultman =

Swedish tennis player

- Country (sports): Sweden
- Born: 11 December 1912 Väsa, Sweden

Team competitions
- Davis Cup: 2R (Europe) (1939)

Morgan Hultman (born 11 December 1912) was a Swedish tennis player who was active in the 1930s.

== Tennis career ==
Hultman was a member of the Swedish Davis Cup team during the 1939 Davis Cup competition. In the Europe Zone second round tie against Denmark, that was played in Stockholm, Hultman lost his first singles matches, against Helge Plougmann and then defeated Niels Holst in his second match. In the quarterfinals against Germany, Hultman lost both his singles matches, against Roderich Menzel and Rolf Göpfert, in straight sets.

== See also ==
- List of Sweden Davis Cup team representatives
