= Sigurd Haanes =

Norwegian ski jumper (1913–1943)

Personal information
- Born: 1 August 1913 Kristiania, Norway
- Died: 3 April 1943 (aged 29) Calverley, England
- Cause of death: Aircraft accident
- Resting place: Ullern
- Relatives: Johan Haanes (brother)

Sport
- Country: Norway
- Sport: Ski jumping
- Club: Njård

Sigurd Clausen Haanes (1 August 1913 – 3 April 1943) was a Norwegian ski jumper and pilot.

He was born in Kristiania as the son of Thorgny Haanes and his wife Hedvig Kristine Clausen, and resided in Vestre Aker. He was the brother of tennis player Johan Haanes, and played doubles tennis with Johan during the summer.

Haanes placed fourth in ski jumping at the FIS Nordic World Ski Championships 1937 in Chamonix. At that time, he was based in Italy as an amateur skiing coach. He was the record holder of the Holmenkollbakken ski jump in 1940. He represented the club Njård.

He had taken the examen artium and commerce school. Following the German invasion of Norway in 1940 he participated in the fighting during the Norwegian Campaign as member of a ski company. He later travelled to the United Kingdom and enrolled in the Air Force where he became a pilot. He died in an aircraft accident in Calverley in 1943. His urn was brought home and buried in Ullern after the war, in October 1945. A memorial cup for Haanes in ski jumping was later instituted.
