= Norwegian International Championships =

Defunct tennis tournament
- Tour: ILTF Circuit (1925-1964)
- Founded: 1925; 100 years ago
- Abolished: 1964; 61 years ago
- Location: Oslo
- Venue: Various

Current champions
- Men's singles: (Sweden) Jan-Erik Lundqvist

The Norwegian International Championships, sometimes referred to as the Oslo International Championships, was an international tennis tournament held from the 1920s to 1964.

== History ==
The Norwegian International Championships was originally a national event, bit it became international in the 1920s. Among the overseas winners were Feodor Hartz, Eric Sturgess, Budge Patty, Neale Fraser, Raymundo Deyro, Malcolm Fox, Rod Laver and Jan-Erik Lundqvist. The event declined in the 1960s.

== Past finals ==
=== Men's singles ===
Year	Champion	Runner-up	Score
1925	(Belgium) Willard Botsford	(West Germany) Hans Moldenhauer	4-6, 6-3, 6-3, 6-2
1930	(West Germany) Feodor Hartz	(Norway) Rolf Christoffersen	
1931	(West Germany) Feodor Hartz	(Norway) Torleif Torkildsen	2-6, 6-2, 6-2, 6-4
1932	(West Germany) Feodor Hartz	(Norway) Ragnar Hagen	6-4, 4-6, 7-5, 6-4
1933	(Norway) Johan Haanes	(West Germany) Harry Schwenker	5-7, 6-2, 5-7, 6-3, 6-0
1940-46	No competition		
1947	(Norway) Johan Haanes	(Norway) Sverre Lie	6-0, 6-3, 6-1
1948	(South Africa) Eric Sturgess	(Norway) Johan Haanes	6-3, 6-1, 6-0
1950	(South Africa) Eric Sturgess	(Egypt) Jaroslav Drobný	2-6, 6-4, 6-4, 4-6, 6-4
1951	(South Africa) Eric Sturgess	(Italy) Fausto Gardini	4-6, 6-4, 5-7, 8-6, 6-3
1952	(South Africa) Eric Sturgess	(France) Philippe Chatrier	6-1, 6-3, 6-3
1953	(Philippines) Raymundo Deyro	(Philippines) Felicisimo Ampon	2-6, 6-3, 3-6, 6-2, 8-6
1954	(Australia) Neale Fraser	(Brazil) Armando Vieira	4-6, 5-7, 6-3, 6-4, 6-2
1955	(Norway) Finn Søhol	(Norway) Jan Staubo	5-7, 6-1, 3-6, 6-2, 7-5
1956	(United States) Malcolm Fox	(Australia) Jack Arkinstall	2-6, 6-3, 6-3, 0-6, 6-1
1957	Not held		
1958	(United States) Budge Patty	(Egypt) Jaroslav Drobný	6-3, 2-6, 1-6, 17-15, 6-4
1959	(United States) Budge Patty	(United States) John W. Frost	6-3, 6-1, 7-5
1960	(Colombia) Bill Alvarez	(Australia) Barry Phillips-Moore	6-3, 7-5, 6-3
1961	(Australia) Warren Woodcock	(Denmark) Jørgen Ulrich	7-5, 10-8, 4-6, 7-5
1962	(Australia) Rod Laver	(Sweden) Jan-Erik Lundqvist	6-1, 4-6, 6-4, 6-3
1963	(Sweden) Jan-Erik Lundqvist	(Australia) Warren Woodcock	6-4, 0-6, 6-2, 6-4
1964	(Sweden) Jan-Erik Lundqvist	(Ecuador) Eduardo Zuleta	6-2, 6-4, 6-2

== See also ==
- Category:National and multi-national tennis tournaments
