= 1939 International Lawn Tennis Challenge =

1939 edition of the International Lawn Tennis Challenge

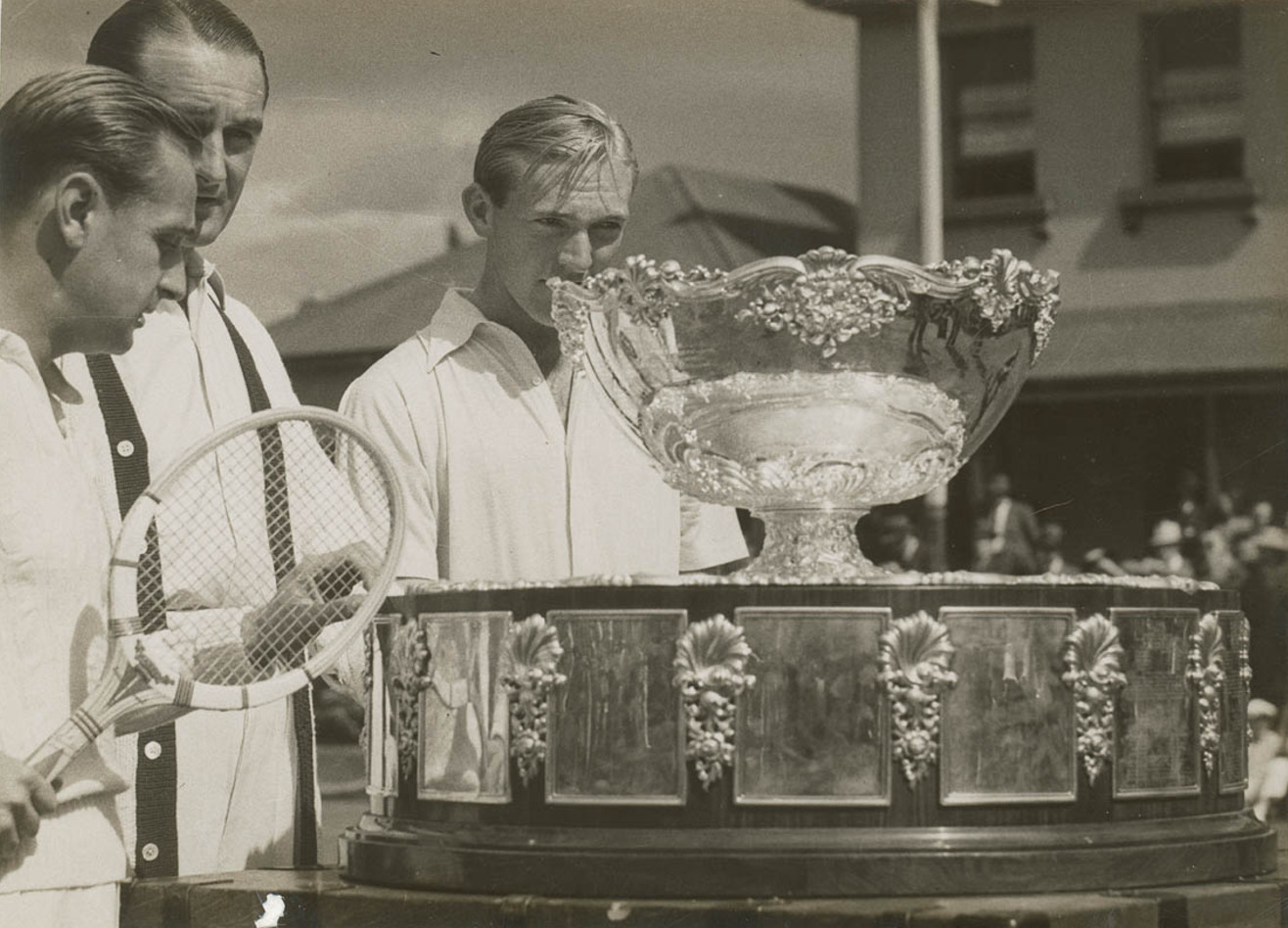
- John Bromwich and Adrian Quist with the Davis Cup trophy in Sydney, November 1939

Details
- Duration: 5 May – 5 September 1939
- Edition: 34th
- Teams: 25

Champion
- Winning nation: Australia

The 1939 International Lawn Tennis Challenge was the 34th edition of what is now known as the Davis Cup. 20 teams entered the Europe Zone, while 7 entered the America Zone.

Australia defeated Cuba in the North & Central America Zone final, and then received a walkover in the America Inter-Zonal final after Brazil, the only team in the South America Zone, withdrew. In the Europe Zone final Yugoslavia defeated Germany. In the Inter-Zonal play-off Australia defeated Yugoslavia, and then defeated the United States in the Challenge Round. The final was played at the Merion Cricket Club in Haverford, Pennsylvania, United States on 2–5 September.

== America Zone ==
=== North & Central America Zone ===
Quarterfinals; 30 June–23 July
Philippines
bye
Mexico City, Mexico (clay)
Australia	5
Mexico	0
Havana, Cuba (clay)
Canada	1
Cuba	4
bye
Japan

Semifinals; 14–16 July
Long Beach, CA, United States (grass)
Philippines	0
Australia	5
Cuba	w/o
Japan (Note: Japan withdrew from the competition after their top player, Jiro Yamagishi, joined the Imperial Japanese Navy.)

Final; 10–12 August
Rumson, NJ, United States (grass)
Australia	5
Cuba	0

==== Final ====
Cuba vs. Australia

Cuba
0
Seabright Lawn Tennis Club, Rumson, NJ, United States
10–12 August 1939
Grass

Australia
5

			1	2	3	4	5
1	(Cuba) (Australia)	José Agüero; John Bromwich	6; 8	0; 6	2; 6
2	(Cuba) (Australia)	Ricardo Morales; Adrian Quist	0; 6	2; 6	2; 6
3	(Cuba) (Australia)	Ricardo Morales / Lorenzo Nodarse; John Bromwich / Adrian Quist	1; 6	0; 6	3; 6
4	(Cuba) (Australia)	Ricardo Morales; John Bromwich	6; 8	6; 8	1; 6
5	(Cuba) (Australia)	José Agüero; Adrian Quist	1; 6	0; 6	0; 6

=== Americas Inter-Zonal Final ===
Australia defeated Brazil by walkover.

== Europe Zone ==
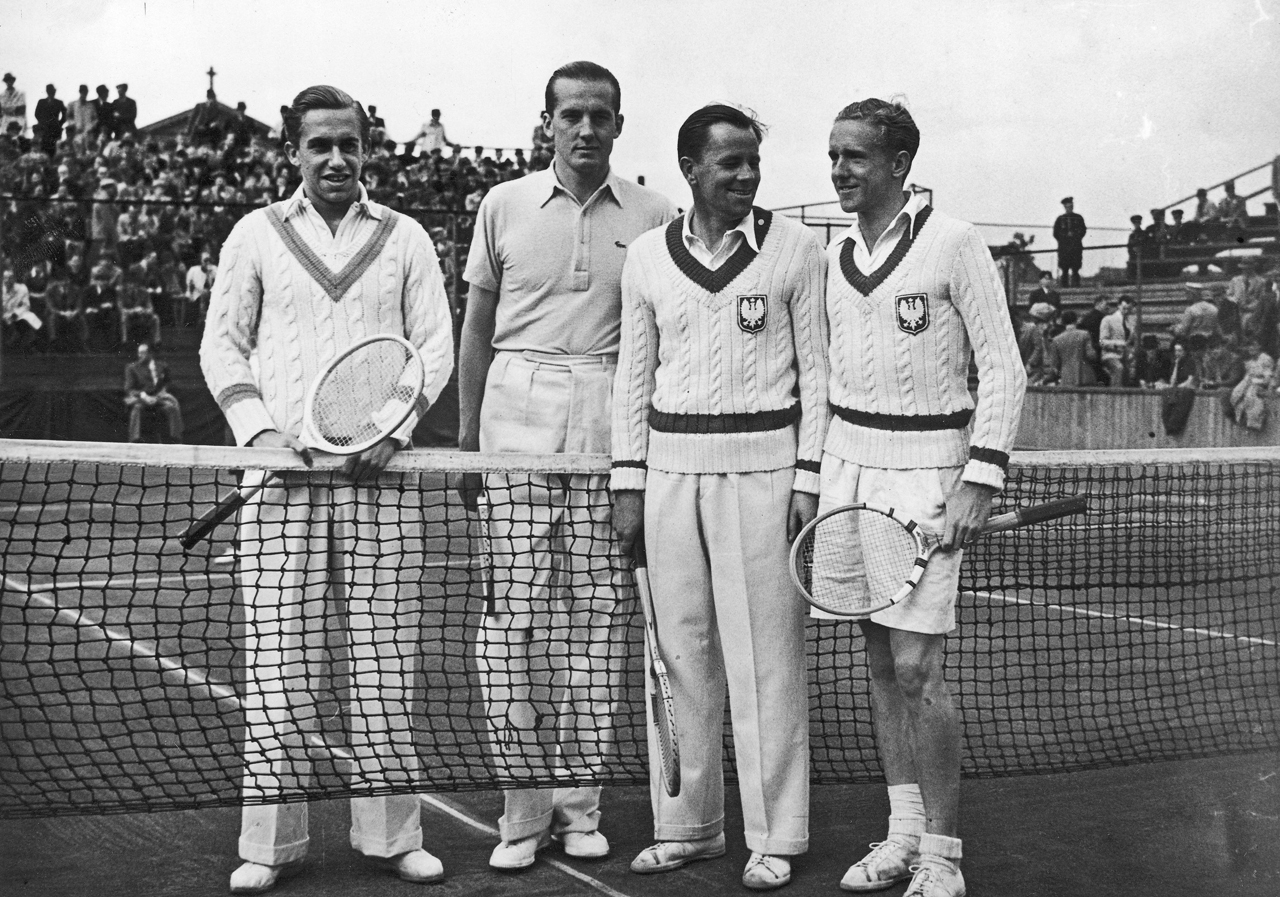
Second-round match between Germany and Poland in Warsaw: Henner Henkel, Georg von Metaxa, Józef Hebda, Adam Baworowski

=== Draw ===
First Round; 5–7 May
Great Britain
bye
New Zealand
bye
France
bye
Taiwan
bye
Sweden
bye
Denmark
bye
Germany	5
Switzerland	0
Poland	4
Netherlands	1
Romania	2
Hungary	3
Yugoslavia	5
Ireland	0
bye
Italy
bye
Monaco
bye
Belgium
bye
India
bye
Norway
bye
Czechoslovakia

Second Round; 11–21 May
Brighton, England (clay)
Great Britain	3
New Zealand	2
Paris, France (clay)
France	4
Taiwan	1
Stockholm, Sweden (clay)
Sweden	4
Denmark	1
Warsaw, Poland
Germany	3
Poland	2
Budapest, Hungary
Hungary	1
Yugoslavia	4
Naples, Italy (clay)
Italy	3
Monaco	0
Brussels, Belgium
Belgium	3
India	2
Norway	w/o
Czechoslovakia (Note: The tie between Norway and Czechoslovakia was abandoned due to the German invasion and partition of Czechoslovakia in March 1939.)

Quarterfinals; 25–29 May
Wimbledon, England (grass)
Great Britain	3
France	2
Berlin, Germany (clay)
Sweden	1
Germany	4
Milan, Italy (clay)
Yugoslavia	3
Italy	2
Brussels, Belgium (clay)
Belgium	5
Norway	0

Semifinals; 2–5 June
Berlin, Germany (clay)
Great Britain	0
Germany	5
Zagreb, Yugoslavia
Yugoslavia	3
Belgium	2

Final; 28–30 July
Zagreb, Yugoslavia
Germany	2
Yugoslavia	3

=== Final ===
Yugoslavia vs. Germany

Yugoslavia
3
A.T.K. Stadium, Zagreb, Yugoslavia
28–30 July 1939

Germany
2

			1	2	3	4	5
1	(Kingdom of Yugoslavia) (Germany)	Franjo Punčec; Rolf Göpfert	6; 3	6; 1	6; 0
2	(Kingdom of Yugoslavia) (Germany)	Dragutin Mitić; Henner Henkel	0; 6	1; 6	6; 4	4; 6
3	(Kingdom of Yugoslavia) (Germany)	Franjo Kukuljević / Franjo Punčec; Henner Henkel / Roderich Menzel	7; 9	6; 4	4; 6	6; 3	1; 4
4	(Kingdom of Yugoslavia) (Germany)	Dragutin Mitić; Rolf Göpfert	6; 1	6; 2	6; 3
5	(Kingdom of Yugoslavia) (Germany)	Franjo Punčec; Henner Henkel	10; 8	6; 3	6; 0

== Inter-Zonal Final ==
Australia vs. Yugoslavia

Australia
4
Longwood Cricket Club, Boston, MA, United States
24–26 August 1939
Grass

Yugoslavia
1

			1	2	3	4	5
1	(Australia) (Kingdom of Yugoslavia)	Adrian Quist; Dragutin Mitić	6; 0	6; 4	6; 3
2	(Australia) (Kingdom of Yugoslavia)	John Bromwich; Franjo Punčec	2; 6	6; 8	6; 0	2; 6
3	(Australia) (Kingdom of Yugoslavia)	John Bromwich / Adrian Quist; Franjo Kukuljević / Franjo Punčec	6; 2	6; 3	6; 3
4	(Australia) (Kingdom of Yugoslavia)	John Bromwich; Dragutin Mitić	6; 1	6; 3	6; 2
5	(Australia) (Kingdom of Yugoslavia)	Adrian Quist; Franjo Kukuljević	6; 2	6; 3	6; 4

== Challenge Round ==
United States vs. Australia

United States
2
Merion Cricket Club, Haverford, PA, United States
2–5 September 1939
Grass

Australia
3

			1	2	3	4	5
1	(United States) (Australia)	Bobby Riggs; John Bromwich	6; 4	6; 0	7; 5
2	(United States) (Australia)	Frank Parker; Adrian Quist	6; 3	2; 6	6; 4	1; 6	7; 5
3	(United States) (Australia)	Joe Hunt / Jack Kramer; John Bromwich / Adrian Quist	7; 5	2; 6	5; 7	2; 6
4	(United States) (Australia)	Bobby Riggs; Adrian Quist	1; 6	4; 6	6; 3	6; 3	4; 6
5	(United States) (Australia)	Frank Parker; John Bromwich	0; 6	3; 6	1; 6

== See also ==
- 1939 Wightman Cup
