= Nils Rohlsson =

Swedish tennis player (1916–1979)

- Country (sports): Sweden
- Born: 31 March 1916; Trelleborg, Sweden
- Died: 20 May 1979 (aged 63); Danderyd, Sweden
- Turned pro: 1937 (amateur tour)
- Retired: 1958

Singles

Grand Slam singles results
- Wimbledon: 1R (1952)

Doubles

Grand Slam doubles results
- Wimbledon: 2R (1952)

Nils Ingvar Rohlsson (31 March 1916 – 20 May 1979) was a Swedish tennis player.

== Tennis career ==
Rohlsson made his first appearances as a Davis Cup player for Sweden in 1938, during the Europe Zone second round tie against Switzerland. He represented Sweden again in 1939, in the tie between Sweden and Germany, that was played in Berlin during the month of May, three months before the outbreak of World War II. Rohlsson and Kalle Schröder managed the Swedish team's only victory of the tie, beating the German doubles pair of Henner Henkel and Georg von Metaxa.

His international career was interrupted by the War and he returned to Davis Cup tennis during the 1952 season, when he made his last two appearances in the competition. On both occasions he only played in the doubles, partnering Torsten Johansson. The pair won their match in the second round tie against Chile, but in the quarterfinal against Belgium, they lost in four sets to Jacques Brichant and Philippe Washer. Rohlsson went on to act as the non–playing captain of the Swedish Davis Cup team, from 1957 to 1959.

Rohlsson participated in one Grand Slam event, the 1952 Wimbledon Championships, where he lost in the first round in the singles event and in the second round in the doubles.

== See also ==
- List of Sweden Davis Cup team representatives
