= Roderich Menzel =

Czech-German tennis player and writer

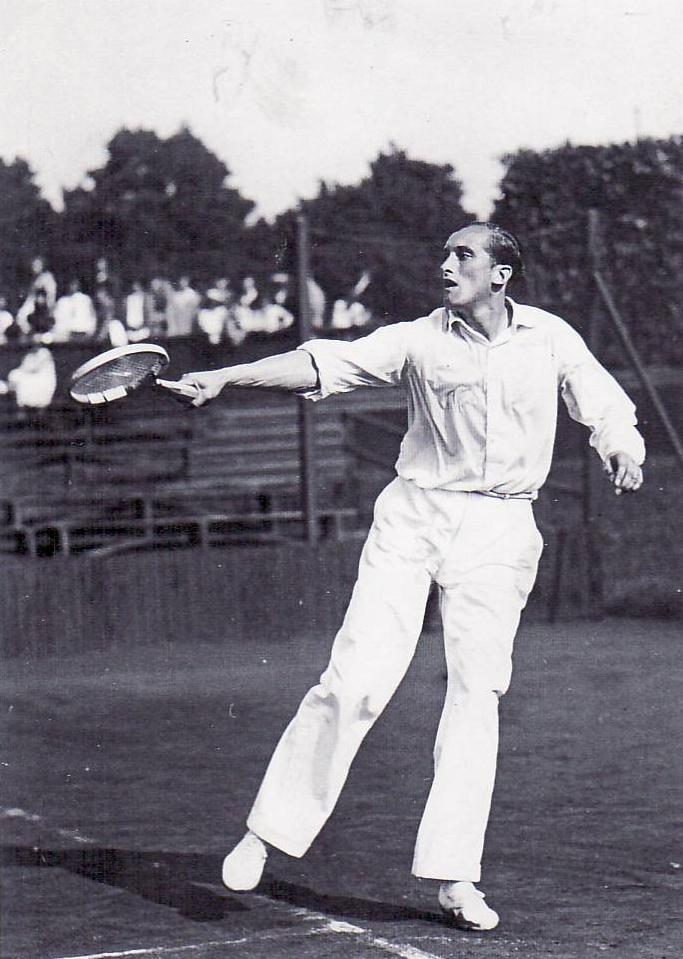
- Full name: Roderich Ferdinand Ottomar Menzel
- Country (sports): (First Czechoslovak Republic) Czechoslovakia (Nazi Germany) Germany
- Born: 13 April 1907 Liberec, Austria-Hungary
- Died: 17 October 1987 (aged 80) Munich, West Germany
- Height: 1.91 m (6 ft 3 in)
- Turned pro: 1928 (amateur tour)
- Retired: 1939 (brief comeback in 1951)
- Plays: Right-handed (1-handed backhand)

Singles
- Highest ranking: No. 7 (1934, A. Wallis Myers)

Grand Slam singles results
- Australian Open: QF (1935)
- French Open: F (1938)
- Wimbledon: QF (1933, 1935)
- US Open: 4R (1934, 1935)

Grand Slam doubles results
- Wimbledon: SF (1937)

Grand Slam mixed doubles results
- US Open: F (1935)

Roderich Ferdinand Ottomar Menzel (German pronunciation: [ˈrɒdərɪk ˈmɛnʦəl]; 13 April 1907 – 17 October 1987) was a Czech-German amateur tennis player and, after his active career, a writer.

== Birth ==
Roderich Menzel was born in Reichenberg in Bohemia (today Liberec in the Czech Republic). He lived with his parents and two brothers in a three-storey house in Römheldstraße 7 (Tatranská street these days). His father Ernst, who was born in the family of glassworks manager in the mountain village Wilhelmshöhe, rose from a correspondent to the position of a partner of cable manufacturer Felten & Guilleaume's North Bohemia office.

During his studies at a business high school he started playing football as a goalkeeper for RSK Reichenberg – at the age of 16 (1923) he joined the senior team. Looking back on his goalkeeper career, Menzel often gave a story about his idol, goalkeeper of RSK Reichenberg, Ende. As is usual, home team goalkeeper's name always appeared at the very end of both team rosters in the home programme but in this case people often thought that at that point the programme actually ends.

But as he was playing tennis at same level as football, an important decision had to be made. He chose tennis and soon became a Czechoslovak junior champion (1925). Shortly before he had to cope with a large family tragedy, when his father died of a heart attack due to complicated double pneumonia.

== Tennis career ==
In 1928, Menzel first qualified for the main Wimbledon competition and also entered a Davis Cup competition against Sweden. He immediately won his first two singles in his long successful Davis Cup career (61 wins/23 defeats), which in a history of the Czech (Czechoslovak) Davis Cup team remains unsurpassed. Among his memorable Davis Cup performances belongs a couple of five set battles against Gottfried Von Cramm, his great rival at the time.

Menzel also collected his trophies at other tournaments. In 1931, he won one of the most prestigious tournaments at the time, the German Open Tennis Championships, over Gustav Jaenecke and Monte-Carlo Masters just one year later, over George Rogers. Only few weeks later he achieved his big first Grand Slam result when he made it to the French Championships semifinals, where he lost to Giorgio de Stefani. His excellent form continued as he won over von Cramm in the semifinal and Jacques Brugnon in the final of the Rot-Weiß Club tournament in Berlin.

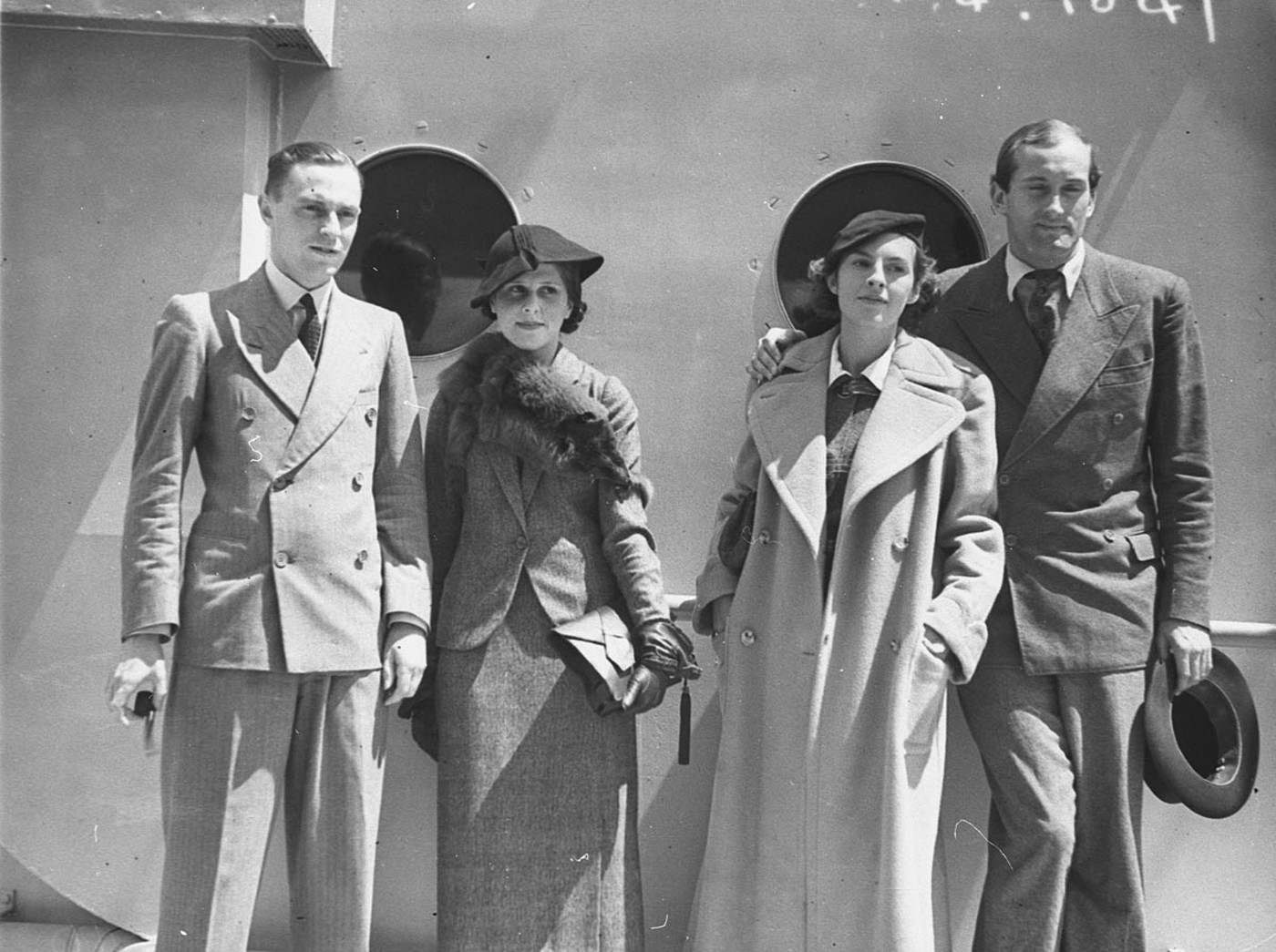
Arrival of international tennis stars to compete in the summer 1934–1935 Australian tournaments. Menzel with his first wife Bucky on the right.

His stable form Menzel also confirmed one year later, in 1933, when he was playing quarterfinals at the French Championships and Wimbledon. He reached the same result in 1934, narrowly losing against von Cramm at the French Championships and, in one of the most memorable matches of all time, to Fred Perry at Wimbledon. Things got better at the Czechoslovakian International Championships (against von Cramm) and Egypt International (against Pat Hughes), which he both won. What is more, he triumphed at the tournament in Cairo in following four years in a row. In 1934 he and Ladislav Hecht won the Butler Trophy of Monte Carlo, defeating Jacques Brugnon and Jean Lesueur in the final. A. Wallis Myers of The Daily Telegraph ranked Menzel as the World No. 7 for 1934.

There was no exception in 1935, when Menzel again finished his participation in Grand Slam tournaments in the quarter-finals, at the US Championships even in the fourth round. But at the same place he teamed up with Kay Stammers to be the Mixed Doubles runner-up, losing in the finals to Sarah Palfrey / Enrique Maier. A major achievement was reaching the final at the Pacific Southwest Tournament in Los Angeles same year, where he was beaten by Don Budge. But it was for long time Menzel's latest success. In 1936, he suffered couple of breakdowns which resulted in serious heart problems. For more than a year he was forced to reconvalesce. He spent nearly one year in Bad Gräfenberg (now Lázně Jeseník) where he received most of the treatments.

The first symptoms of Menzel's health problems appeared in the quarter-finals of the French Championships, when he played against Bunny Austin, No. 2-ranked player in the world that time. He was leading 2–1 in sets but, while changing sides, he made a mistake and took a sip from his opponent's glass. To his unpleasant surprise, it was a gin instead of water. Vision problems and hallucinations immediately followed and Menzel lost the match. He did not pay too much attention to it until the Davis Cup final a few weeks later, when he played a crucial match of the whole series against von Cramm. The famous German already had two match points in the fourth set, but Menzel managed to avert the threat and won the set 7–5 to tie the match at 2–2. After Menzel won the first game of the fifth set and von Cramm continued to suffer, he received a strange offer at his home bench while changing sides. 'It will strengthen you' said President of the Czech Tennis Association and handed Menzel a glass of champagne! Menzel still managed to nearly win the second game of the fifth set, but once he started to see blurry sidelines, he knew that it was over. He lost the final set 1–6.

Menzel was back in 1937, but his early defeat at Wimbledon (first round) suggests that his comeback would not be that easy. A much better situation was in the doubles, where he managed (with Ladislav Hecht) to get into the semi-finals. Everything was forgiven one year later, when Menzel was the men's singles runner-up at the French Open, losing in the final against Budge. His biggest success of all time was a little bit reduced by an absence of great players such as von Cramm or Perry.

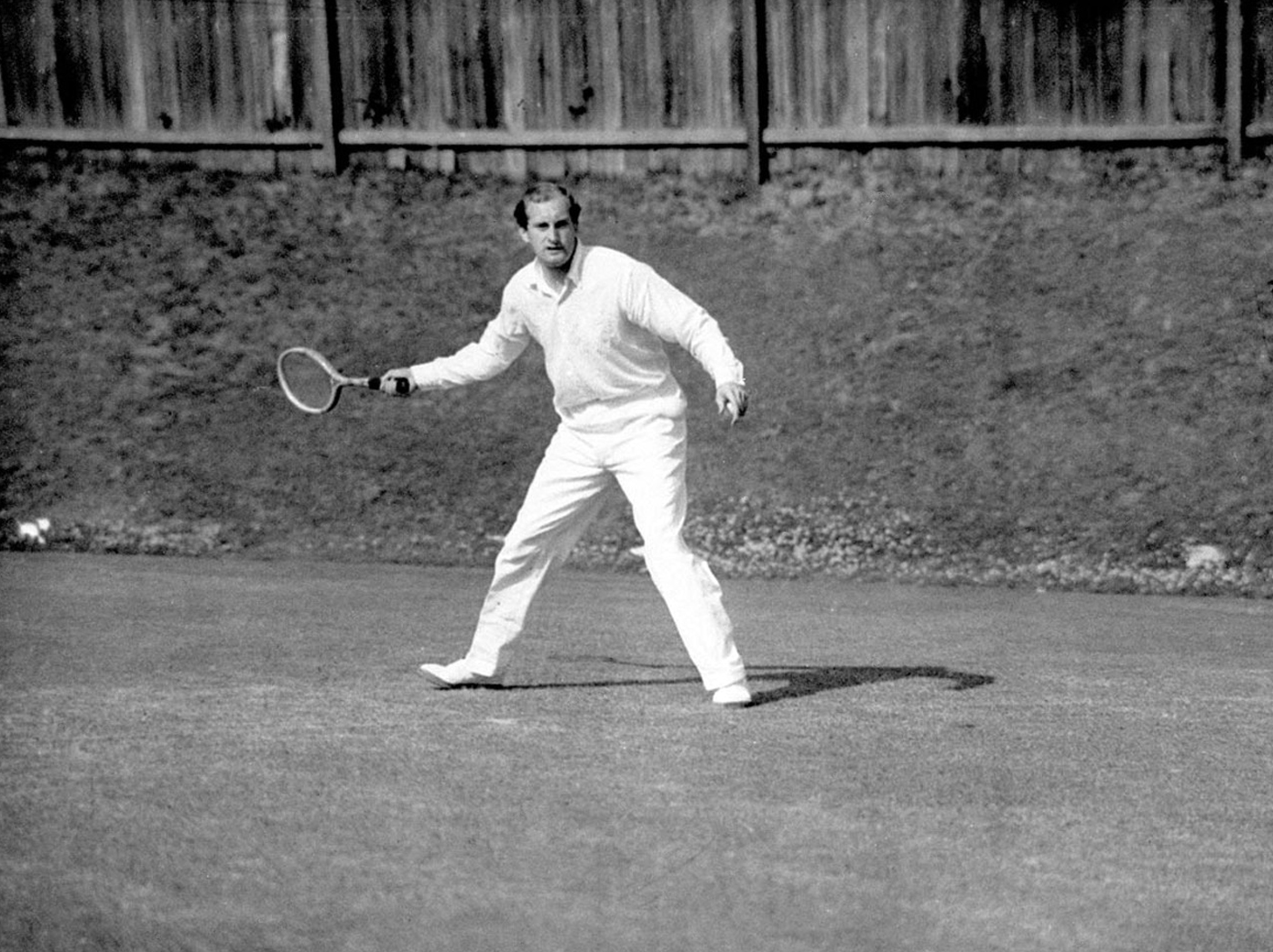
Roderich Menzel at the White City Stadium in Sydney, Australia in November 1934

In September 1938, on the basis of the Munich Agreement, it was decided that Czechoslovakia had to lose a part of its territory (Sudetenland) to Nazi Germany. Menzel, who was born and spent his childhood in Reichenberg, now the capital of a new German state, became also a German citizen. In May 1939, only a few months later, he already played for his new homeland, Germany, in the Davis Cup. After the outbreak of World War II, Menzel started working as a journalist in a foreign broadcast of Großdeutscher Rundfunk. Unlike his other colleagues in the team (Henner Henkel was killed at Battle of Stalingrad, von Cramm was wounded on the Eastern Front) Menzel didn't have to go to the front, and spent the war years in the relative safety of Berlin (he lived in the Bavarian Quarter, Güntzelstraße 4). After the war, Menzel tried to build on his pre-war tennis achievements, but with the exception of a few victories in tournaments of only regional significance, his career came to an end.

Roderich Menzel had at that time an unusually tall physique (6 ft 3in), which directly predetermined him to a serve and volley style of play. He was also notorious for his fierce temper – he refused to play until the nearby bells stopped ringing or a child stopped crying in the stands. Menzel also loved often to passionately „discuss" with the judge and spectators. The spectators at the stadium of the Italian tennis championships in Rome annoyed him to such an extent that he went off the court and never came back. Although Menzel failed to win any Grand Slam tournaments, his achievements in the Davis Cup and at the most prestigious international tournaments rank him among the world tennis elite of the time.

== Travel ==
There was yet another addition to Menzel's passions – travel. He was often, as he states, in a good mood, when he was eliminated from some tournament, because he had more time to explore and appreciate the local attractions. When he saw something extraordinary, he often had to think about it during the next match.

Africa remained among his favourite parts of the world, not only because of his five consecutive wins in a row at International Championships in Cairo. Cairo, pyramids, Alexandria, Luxor, Nile, Assuan – all these places made a huge impression on him each time he visited. He often recalled meeting with many interesting people while in Africa, such as Sheikh Mussa, King of snakes. It was particularly in Egypt that he felt at home while travelling the world.

Menzel also visited Australia several times, sometimes with mixed feelings. It certainly had something to do with a conflict that happened during one doubles match, when the audience didn't want to allow the players to leave the court, even though it was becoming dark; "Play on – we paid" they shouted. However, this conflict didn't prevent Menzel from going all around Australia and subsequently the entire Pacific region (Samoa, Tahiti, Hawaii).

In the summer of 1935 Menzel came to India – Kolkata, Mumbai, elephants ride, expedition into the jungle, meeting with the Maharajah of Mysore. Especially the latter area charmed him quite a lot – "Mysore has two skies – one above me and the other beneath me!". Menzel's next steps led to Ceylon and Japan. He visited Hong Kong and Singapore on the way back.

With tennis Menzel was able to travel all around a world completely different from the one we know today, at the very end of the so-called colonial era. "Many things have changed since my travels", writes Menzel in his autobiography Liebe zu Böhmen.

== Literary career ==
Already when Roderich Menzel was at the peak of his athletic career, he contributed as a journalist to many newspapers and magazines. His articles were not only about sport, he also wrote about numerous experiences from his travels around the world.

Before World War II, Menzel mostly contributed to Prager Tagblatt, where his colleagues were such names as Egon Erwin Kisch or Max Brod. Menzel didn't write only to the daily sports column, he also composed poems and It is definitely worth noting that Menzel alternated for two years with Hermann Hesse and Karel Čapek in Saturday's feuilleton column of Prager Tagblatt. Apart from this major Prague German newspaper Menzel also wrote to BZ am Mittag and Vossische Zeitung. In 1931, he published his first sports novel Der weiße Weg, which was also published in Zurich daily Sport and came out in Czech translation under title Bílá cesta one year later. Soon followed by other titles, mostly from the tennis environment – Tennis… wie ich sehe!, Tennis-Parade or Geliebte Tennispartnerin. But he was able to fully focus on his writing passion to the end of his athletic career.

In his new home, Bavarian Landshut, Menzel wrote books not only about his most favourite sports (tennis and football), but he also began to wonder about the other genres. Great success was the medical book Triumph der Medizin, which earned admiration even among the professional community (it was included in the compulsory literature of medical universities in Japan). Meanwhile, he moved to Munich, where he started to work as head of feuilleton department in a newspaper Echo der Woche. Menzel met there his future wife, illustrator Johanna Sengler, who gave him an idea to start writing books for children.

Since the early 60's he published (some under the pseudonym Clemens Parma) number of books for the youngest readers – fairy tales, poems and legends, often from his native land. Märchenreise ins Sudetenland, Neue Rüberzahl-Geschichten or Schlesische Märchen. Most of his books for children were illustrated by his new wife – Pitt und das verzauberte Fahrrad, Zotti der Bär or Der fliegende Teppich. In 1963, Menzel won the 1st Prize in the best children's book competition, organized by the Federal Ministry for Displaced Persons, Refugees and War Victims, for his book Die Buben am Hammersee. Menzel also proved his creative talent in radio, television and theater. In 1950 he won, together with Josef Mühlberger, a competition of Adalbert Stifter Association for the best drama. Menzel's theater play Rüberzahl, conducted by Schauspiel Studio Iserlohn, was played in 43 German cities.

Menzel's memories had fully come to life in his work from 1970's. First in his autobiography Liebe zu Böhmen, and then in the Die Tannhofs trilogy (1974–1981), the highlight of his work. In these books Menzel describes abrupt changes of Central Europe during the 20th century on the background of one family. He also fully confessed his admiration for the Austro-Hungarian Empire there. After completion of the trilogy in the early 1980s Menzel concluded his work with the sports topics again and wrote profiles of the leading German footballers: Die Großen des Sports: Toni Schumacher or Die Großen des Sports: Karl-Heinz Förster.

== Bibliography ==
=== Verse ===
- Zwischen Mensch und Gott (1937)
- Lied am Brunnenrand (1953)

=== Novels ===
- Ein Mann, wie neugeboren (1942)
- Die Männer sind so wankelmütig (1958)
- Die Tannhoffs 1: Als Böhmen noch bei Österreich war (1974)
- Die Tannhoffs 2: Der Pulverturm (1977)
- Die Tannhoffs 3: Die Sieger (1981)

=== History books ===
- Wunder geschehen jeden Tag (1955)
- Ein Herz für das Volk (1956)
- Sie haben die Welt verzaubert (1967)
- Liebe zu Böhmen (1973)

=== Travel books ===
- Unglaublich, aber wahr! (1940)
- Abenteuer, Geheimnis und große Fahrt (1953)
- Ruhm war ihr Begleiter (1964)
- Adam schuf die Erde neu (1968)

=== Children's books ===
- Vom Jungen, der die Zeit verstellte (1959)
- Tischlein deck dich, Esel streck dich, Knüppel aus dem Sack (1960)
- Abenteuer auf Sizilien (1960)
- Der Rattenfänger von Hameln (1961)
- Hänsel und Gretel (1961)
- Till Eulenspiegel (1962)
- Pitt und das verzauberte Fahrrad (1963)
- Im Land der Perlentaucher (1963)
- Der wandernde Schuh (1963)
- Ruhm war ihr Begleiter (1964)
- Das Wunderauto (1964)
- Geheimer Treffpunkt: Waldhütte (1964)
- Schneewittchen (1964)
- Wie Kasperle die Prinzessin bekam (1965)
- Wie Tom den Krieg abschaffte (1966)
- Leo der Löwe (1966)
- Kitti, das Kätzchen (1966)
- Juri das Zauberpony (1966)
- Zotti der Bär (1966)
- Mario und Grissi (1967)
- Märchenreise ins Sudetenland (1967)
- Der fliegende Teppich (1968)
- Thomas, grosser Fussballheld (1968)
- Peter und die Turmuhr (1968)
- Sabu spielt die Hirtenflöte (1968)
- Der Vogelkönig (1970)
- Stärker als 1000 Pferde (1972)
- Neue Rübezahl-Geschichten (1973)
- Lockende Ferne (1974)
- Geheimversteck Burgruine (1977)
- Den Schmugglern auf der Spur (1977)
- Österreichische Märchen (1978)
- Schlesische Märchen (1979)
- Wo die Kinder wohnen (1981)
- Tills abenteuerliche Ferien (1981)
- Zwei Junge Detektive (1982)
- Die schönsten Märchen (1987)

=== Sports books ===
- Tennis ... wie ich es sehe! (1932)
- Tennis-Parade (1937)
- Geliebte Tennispartnerin (1940)
- Weltmacht Tennis (1951)
- Deutsches Tennis (1955)
- Tennis für dich und mich (1957)
- Tennislehrgang (1963)
- Weltmeister auf dem Eis: Kilius/Bäumler (1963)
- Mein Fussball und ich (1964)
- Spiel, Kampf, Sieg (1965)
- Sportregeln, die jeder kennen sollte (1966)
- Meine Freunde, die Weltmeister (1966)
- Die besten elf Skiläufer (1972)
- Männer gegen Eis und Wüste (1974)
- Die besten elf Fussballstars (1974)
- Die besten elf Fussballer (1976)
- Die besten elf Tennismeister (1977)
- Die besten elf Torjäger (1977)
- Die besten Fussballstars (1980)
- Goldmann-Tennis-Lexikon (1980)
- Elf berühmte Fußballer (1980)
- Die neuen Fussballgrössen (1981)
- Elf berühmte Fussballer (1981)
- Fussball – Fussball: Spieler, Trainer, Meisterschaften (1982)
- Berühmte Fussballstars und ihre Trainer, Manager und Fans (1983)
- Die jungen Fussball-Löwen (1985)
- Von As bis Aus (1986)

=== Biographies ===
- Max Reinhardt (1959)
- Die Großen des Sports: Sepp Maier (1980)
- Die Großen des Sports: Luis Trenker (1982)
- Die Großen des Sports: Paul Breitner (1982)
- Die Großen des Sports: Toni Schumacher (1983)
- Die Großen des Sports: Karl-Heinz Rummenigge (1983)
- Die Großen des Sports: Karl-Heinz Förster (1983)
- Die Großen des Sports: Pierre Littbarski (1983)
- Die Großen des Sports: Reinhold Messner (1983)
- Reinhold Messner. Bergsteiger und Abenteurer (1987)

=== Medical books ===
- Triumph der Medizin (1950)
- Männer, die den Krebs bekämpfen (1953)
- Rettung für Millionen (1956)

=== Scientific books ===
- Die Herren von morgen (1963)
- Bis ans Ende der Welt (1971)
- 7 × 7 Weltwunder (1972)

== Marriages ==
Roderich Menzel married:

- Anna Maria 'Bucky' Rabl (1908–1953), an enthusiastic tennis player and downhill skier (she was born in Innsbruck), often accompanied Menzel on his trips around the world. They married on 11 February 1931 in Innsbruck. She later married Josef, Baron von Colloredo-Mansfeld. Her daughter, Kristina Colloredo-Mansfeld is the owner of the Opočno Castle in the Czech Republic. They divorced in 1937.
- Erika Franziska Josefa Wurdinger (1914), had a tragic personal experience with the expulsion of Germans from Czechoslovakia after World War II – her father was murdered. They married on 18 January 1938 in Saaz an der Eger. They have two sons: Michael and Christian.
- Gerda ?. They have two daughters: Renate and Carola.
- Johanna Sengler (1924), an illustrator and graphic artist, exhibited her work worldwide (e.g. USA, Srí Lanka, Netherlands, Switzerland). In 1972, she founded an art school for children, later also for adult. They married on 12 December 1952 and divorced in 1970. They have one son: Peter.

== Death ==
In spring 1983, Menzel was injured in an automobile accident from which he never fully recovered. He died on 17 October 1987 in hospital in Munich-Pasing, Germany, aged 80.

== Grand Slam finals ==
=== Singles (1 runner-up) ===
| Result | Year | Championship | Surface | Opponent | Score |
|---|---|---|---|---|---|
| Loss | 1938 | French Championships | Clay | (United States) Don Budge | 3–6, 2–6, 4–6 |

=== Mixed doubles (1 runner-up) ===
| Result | Year | Championship | Surface | Partner | Opponents | Score |
|---|---|---|---|---|---|---|
| Loss | 1935 | U.S. National Championships | Grass | (United Kingdom) Kay Stammers | (United States) Sarah Palfrey (Spain) Enrique Maier | 3–6, 6–3, 4–6 |

== Performance timeline ==
Key
| W | F | SF | QF | #R | RR | Q# | DNQ | A | NH |

(W) winner; (F) finalist; (SF) semifinalist; (QF) quarterfinalist; (#R) rounds 4, 3, 2, 1; (RR) round-robin stage; (Q#) qualification round; (DNQ) did not qualify; (A) absent; (NH) not held; (SR) strike rate (events won / competed); (W–L) win–loss record.

| Tournament | Amateur career | | | | | | | | | | | |
| Tournament | '28 | '29 | '30 | '31 | '32 | '33 | '34 | '35 | '36 | '37 | '38 | '39 |
|---|---|---|---|---|---|---|---|---|---|---|---|---|
Grand Slam Tournaments
| Australian | A | A | A | A | A | A | A | QF | A | A | A | A |
| French | A | 2R | A | 4R | SF | QF | QF | QF | A | A | F | A |
| Wimbledon | 1R | 1R | 2R | A | 4R | QF | 3R | QF | A | 1R | 4R | 2R |
| U.S. | A | A | A | A | A | A | 4R | 4R | A | A | A | A |

== Career finals ==
| Result | No. | Date | Championship | Surface | Opponent | Score |
|---|---|---|---|---|---|---|
| Loss | 1. | May 1929 | Rot Weiss Club, Berlin | Clay | (France) Henri Cochet | 11–9, 3–6, 1–6, 1–6 |
| Loss | 2. | Sep 1929 | Hungarian Championships, Budapest | | (Hungary) Béla von Kehrling | 7–5, 4–6, 6–3 ret. |
| Loss | 3. | Jul 1930 | Netherlands Championships, Noordwijk | | (United States) Bill Tilden | 6–8, 8–6, 3–6, 4–6 |
| Win | 1. | Sep 1930 | Hungarian Championships, Budapest | | (Hungary) Béla von Kehrling | 4–6, 6–3, 6–4, 6–1 |
| Loss | 4. | May 1931 | Austrian Championships, Vienna | | (France) Henri Cochet | 6–4, 1–6, 1–6, 4–6 |
| Win | 2. | Aug 1931 | German International Championships, Hamburg | Clay | (Germany) Gustav Jaenecke | 6–2, 6–2, 6–1 |
| Win | 3. | Feb 1932 | Monte-Carlo Masters | Clay | (Republic of Ireland) George Lyttleton-Rogers | 6–4, 7–5, 6–2 |
| Win | 4. | May 1932 | Rot Weiss Club, Berlin | Clay | (France) Jacques Brugnon | 6–4, 6–3, 6–3 |
| Loss | 5. | Aug 1932 | German International Championships, Hamburg | | (Weimar Republic) Gottfried von Cramm | 6–3, 2–6, 2–6, 3–6 |
| Loss | 6. | 1933 | Rot Weiss Club, Berlin | | (Germany) Gottfried von Cramm | 6–2, 1–6, 13–15 |
| Win | 5. | May 1933 | Czechoslovakian International Championships | | (Czechoslovakia) Ladislav Hecht | 6–3, 6–2, 6–1 |
| Loss | 7. | Aug 1933 | German International Championships, Hamburg | Clay | (Germany) Gottfried von Cramm | 5–7, 6–2, 6–4, 3–6, 4–6 |
| Win | 6. | Sep 1933 | Yugoslavian Championships, Zagreb | | (Italy) Umberto De Morpurgo | 6–4, 6–1, 6–1 |
| Win | 7. | Sep 1933 | Hungarian Championships | | (Hungary) Emil Gábori | 6–2, 6–0, 6–1 |
| Win | 8. | Mar 1934 | Egypt International Tournament | | (United Kingdom) Pat Hughes | 6–3, 6–4 |
| Win | 9. | May 1934 | Czechoslovakian International Championships | | (Germany) Gottfried von Cramm | 3–6, 6–1, 6–3, 6–2 |
| Win | 10. | 1935 | Cairo Championships | | (Austria) Adam Baworowski | 7–5, 5–7, 6–2 |
| Win | 11. | Mar 1935 | Egypt International Tournament | | (Austria) Hermann Artens | 6–4, 6–0, 6–0 |
| Win | 12. | 1935 | Czechoslovakian International Championships | | (Italy) Giovanni Palmieri | 6–2, 6–1, 6–1 |
| Loss | 8. | Sep 1935 | Pacific Southwest Tournament, Los Angeles | | (United States) Don Budge | 6–1, 9–11, 3–6 w.o. |
| Loss | 9. | Nov 1935 | Japan International Championships, Osaka | | (Japan) Jiro Yamagishi | 5–7, 2–6, 1–6 |
| Loss | 10. | Jun 1938 | French Open | Clay | (United States) Don Budge | 3–6, 2–6, 4–6 |
| Win | 13. | 1938 | Egypt International Tournament | | (Socialist Federal Republic of Yugoslavia) Franjo Punčec | 6–4, 6–2 |
| Loss | 11. | 1939 | French Covered Courts Championships | | (France) Pierre Pellizza | 6–4, 2–6, 2–6, 1–6 |
| Loss | 12. | 1939 | German International Championships, Hamburg | Clay | (Germany) Henner Henkel | 6–4, 4–6, 0–6, 1–6 |

== Davis Cup ==
=== For Czechoslovakia ===
Europe Zone
| Round | Date | Opponents | Final match score | Venue | Surface | Match | Opponent | Rubber score |
| 2R | 17–19 May 1928 | Sweden | 4–1 | Stockholm | clay | Singles 2 | Sune Malmström | 6–3, 6–3, 3–6, 7–5 (W) |
| 2R | 17–19 May 1928 | Sweden | 4–1 | Stockholm | clay | Singles 4 | Ingvar Garell | 6–2, 6–0, 5–7, 8–6 (W) |
| SF | 22–24 June 1928 | Netherlands | 3–2 | Prague | N/A | Doubles (with Jan Koželuh) | Hendrik Timmer / Christiaan van Lennep | 3–6, 6–3, 2–6, 4–6(L) |
| 1R | 26–28 April 1929 | Austria | 3–2 | Wien | N/A | Singles 2 | Hermann von Artens | 6–3, 6–4, 6–2 (W) |
| 1R | 26–28 April 1929 | Austria | 3–2 | Wien | N/A | Singles 4 | Franz-Wilhelm Matejka | 8–10, 3–6, 1–6 (L) |
| 2R | 10–12 May 1929 | Belgium | 3–0 | Prague | N/A | Singles 1 | André La Croix | 6–3, 6–1, 6–1 (W) |
| 2R | 10–12 May 1929 | Belgium | 3–0 | Prague | N/A | Singles 5 | André Ewbank | NP (N) |
| QF | 5–7 June 1929 | Denmark | 4–1 | Copenhagen | N/A | Singles 1 | Povl Henriksen | 9–7, 6–2, 6–3 (W) |
| QF | 5–7 June 1929 | Denmark | 4–1 | Copenhagen | N/A | Singles 4 | Einer Ulrich | 7–5, 7–5, 6–2 (W) |
| SF | 19–21 June 1929 | Germany | 1–4 | Prague | N/A | Singles 2 | Heinz Landmann | 6–3, 6–3, 3–6, 0–6, 6–4 (W) |
| SF | 19–21 June 1929 | Germany | 1–4 | Prague | N/A | Singles 4 | Hans Moldenhauer | 4–6, 6–8, 4–6 (L) |
| 2R | 16–18 May 1930 | Denmark | 3–2 | Prague | N/A | Singles 1 | Erik Worm | 6–2, 6–2, 4–6, 6–2 (W) |
| 2R | 16–18 May 1930 | Denmark | 3–2 | Prague | N/A | Doubles (with Friedrich Rohrer) | Einer Ulrich / Erik Worm | 3–6, 6–1, 4–6, 6–4, 7–9 (L) |
| 2R | 16–18 May 1930 | Denmark | 3–2 | Prague | N/A | Singles 4 | Einer Ulrich | 6–2, 6–2, 6–1 (W) |
| QF | 30 May–1 June 1930 | Netherlands | 3–2 | Scheveningen | clay | Singles 2 | Arthur Diemer-Kool | 6–3, 6–3, 6–2 (W) |
| QF | 30 May–1 June 1930 | Netherlands | 3–2 | Scheveningen | clay | Doubles (with Jan Koželuh) | Arthur Diemer-Kool/Hendrik Timmer | 7–9, 6–2, 6–1, 3–6, 6–4 (W) |
| QF | 30 May–1 June 1930 | Netherlands | 3–2 | Scheveningen | clay | Singles 4 | Hendrik Timmer | 6–8, 0–6, 6–4, 5–7 (L) |
| SF | 14–16 June 1930 | Japan | 2–3 | Prague | N/A | Singles 1 | Takeichi Harada | 9–11, 6–3, 7–5, 6–1 (W) |
| SF | 14–16 June 1930 | Japan | 2–3 | Prague | N/A | Doubles (with Jan Koželuh) | Tamio Abe / Takeichi Harada | 6–1, 5–7, 6–8, 7–9 (L) |
| SF | 14–16 June 1930 | Japan | 2–3 | Prague | N/A | Singles 5 | Yoshiro Ota | 6–2, 4–6, 6–3, 6–3 (W) |
| 1R | 1–3 May 1931 | Spain | 3–2 | Prague | N/A | Singles 1 | Enrique Maier | 6–3, 6–2, 6–3 (W) |
| 1R | 1–3 May 1931 | Spain | 3–2 | Prague | N/A | Doubles (with Friedrich Rohrer) | Manuel Alonso-Areyzaga / Enrique Maier | 1–6, 7–9, 1–6 (L) |
| 1R | 1–3 May 1931 | Spain | 3–2 | Prague | N/A | Singles 5 | Manuel Alonso-Areyzaga | 6–8, 6–2, 6–1, 6–3 (W) |
| 2R | 15–17 May 1931 | Greece | 4–1 | Athens | N/A | Singles 1 | Augustos Zerlendis | 6–2, 6–2, 6–1 (W) |
| 2R | 15–17 May 1931 | Greece | 4–1 | Athens | N/A | Doubles (with Ferenc Marsalek) | Max Balli / Georgios Nikolaides | 6–2, 6–2, 6–4 (W) |
| 2R | 15–17 May 1931 | Greece | 4–1 | Athens | N/A | Singles 5 | Orestis Garangiotis | 6–1, 6–3, 6–1 (W) |
| QF | 4–6 June 1931 | Italy | 3–0 | Prague | N/A | Singles 2 | Umberto de Morpurgo | 6–3, 6–3, 4–6, 6–2 (W) |
| QF | 4–6 June 1931 | Italy | 3–0 | Prague | N/A | Doubles (with Ferenc Marsalek) | Umberto de Morpurgo / Alberto del Bono | 6–3, 6–4, 6–1 (W) |
| QF | 4–6 June 1931 | Italy | 3–0 | Prague | N/A | Singles 4 | Giorgio de Stefani | NP (N) |
| SF | 16–18 June 1931 | Denmark | 5–0 | Prague | N/A | Singles 1 | Einer Ulrich | 6–3, 6–2, 7–5 (W) |
| SF | 16–18 June 1931 | Denmark | 5–0 | Prague | N/A | Doubles (with Ferenc Marsalek) | Einer Ulrich / Erik Worm | 9–7, 1–6, 6–3, 6–0 (W) |
| SF | 16–18 June 1931 | Denmark | 5–0 | Prague | N/A | Singles 4 | Erik Worm | 3–6, 6–2, 6–4, 6–1 (W) |
| F | 9–11 July 1931 | Great Britain | 1–4 | Prague | clay | Singles 1 | Bunny Austin | 6–3, 2–6, 8–6, 3–6, 3–6 (L) |
| F | 9–11 July 1931 | Great Britain | 1–4 | Prague | clay | Doubles (with Ferenc Maršálek) | Patrick Hughes / Fred Perry | 4–6, 6–4, 4–6, 2–6 (L) |
| F | 9–11 July 1931 | Great Britain | 1–4 | Prague | clay | Singles 5 | Fred Perry | 5–7, 3–6, 5–7 (L) |
| 1R | 6–8 May 1932 | Austria | 2–3 | Prague | N/A | Singles 2 | Franz-Wilhelm Matejka | 3–6, 3–6, 6–3, 6–2, 4–6 (L) |
| 1R | 6–8 May 1932 | Austria | 2–3 | Prague | N/A | Doubles (with Ferenc Marsalek) | Herbert Kinzl / Hermann von Artens | 6–2, 6–1, 6–1 (W) |
| 1R | 6–8 May 1932 | Austria | 2–3 | Prague | N/A | Singles 4 | Hermann von Artens | 6–2, 6–1, 5–7, 6–4 (W) |
| 2R | 12–14 May 1933 | Monaco | 5–0 | Prague | N/A | Singles 1 | Vladimir Landau | 6–2, 6–2, 6–4 (W) |
| 2R | 12–14 May 1933 | Monaco | 5–0 | Prague | N/A | Doubles (with Ferenc Maršálek) | René Gallèpe / Vladimir Landau | 6–1, 6–4, 8–6 (W) |
| 2R | 12–14 May 1933 | Monaco | 5–0 | Prague | N/A | Singles 5 | René Gallèpe | 6–3, 6–2, 6–1 (W) |
| QF | 8–10 June 1933 | Greece | 5–0 | Prague | N/A | Singles 2 | Lazaros Stalios | 6–2, 6–4, 9–7 (W) |
| QF | 8–10 June 1933 | Greece | 5–0 | Prague | N/A | Doubles (with Ferenc Maršálek) | Georgios Nikolaides / Stefanos Xydis | 6–1, 6–1, 6–1 (W) |
| QF | 8–10 June 1933 | Greece | 5–0 | Prague | N/A | Singles 5 | Georgios Nikolaides | 6–1, 6–2, 4–6, 6–0 (W) |
| SF | 17–20 June 1933 | Great Britain | 0–5 | Devonshire Park, Eastbourne | grass | Singles 1 | Fred Perry | 1–6, 4–6, 3–6 (L) |
| SF | 17–20 June 1933 | Great Britain | 0–5 | Devonshire Park, Eastbourne | grass | Doubles (with Ferenc Maršálek) | Patrick Hughes / Fred Perry | 3–6, 4–6, 4–6 (L) |
| SF | 17–20 June 1933 | Great Britain | 0–5 | Devonshire Park, Eastbourne | grass | Singles 5 | Bunny Austin | 6–3, 7–9, 0–6, 1–6 (L) |
| QF | 7–9 June 1934 | New Zealand | 4–1 | Prague | N/A | Singles 2 | Eskell Andrews | 6–1, 6–3, 6–3 (W) |
| QF | 7–9 June 1934 | New Zealand | 4–1 | Prague | N/A | Doubles (with Ladislav Hecht) | Cam Malfroy / Alan Stedman | 5–7, 4–6, 5–7 (L) |
| QF | 7–9 June 1934 | New Zealand | 4–1 | Prague | N/A | Singles 5 | Cam Malfroy | 6–2, 6–0, 6–1 (W) |
| SF | 15–17 June 1934 | Italy | 3–2 | Milan | clay | Singles 2 | Augusto Rado | 6–1, 6–2, 10–8 (W) |
| SF | 15–17 June 1934 | Italy | 3–2 | Milan | clay | Doubles (with Ferenc Maršálek) | Ferruccio Quintavalle / Augusto Rado | 6–8, 6–3, 6–0, 6–4 (W) |
| SF | 15–17 June 1934 | Italy | 3–2 | Milan | clay | Singles 4 | Giorgio de Stefani | 6–0, 5–7, 2–6, 7–5, 3–6 (L) |
| F | 13–15 July 1934 | Australia | 2–3 | Prague | clay | Singles 1 | Vivian McGrath | 10–8, 6–2, 8–6 (W) |
| F | 13–15 July 1934 | Australia | 2–3 | Prague | clay | Doubles (with Ladislav Hecht) | Jack Crawford / Adrian Quist | 4–6, 3–6, 4–6 (L) |
| F | 13–15 July 1934 | Australia | 2–3 | Prague | clay | Singles 4 | Jack Crawford | 6–4, 6–4, 2–6, 8–6 (W) |
| 1R | 10–12 May 1935 | Yugoslavia | 4–1 | Prague | clay | Singles 1 | Franjo Punčec | 6–3, 6–1, 6–1 (W) |
| 1R | 10–12 May 1935 | Yugoslavia | 4–1 | Prague | clay | Doubles (with Ladislav Hecht) | Franjo Kukuljević / Franjo Punčec | 4–6, 4–6, 6–2, 8–6, 6–2 (W) |
| 1R | 10–12 May 1935 | Yugoslavia | 4–1 | Prague | clay | Singles 4 | Josip Palada | 6–0, 6–1, 6–1 (W) |
| QF | 7–9 June 1935 | Japan | 4–1 | Prague | N/A | Singles 2 | Hideo Nishimura | 6–2, 6–3, 8–6 (W) |
| QF | 7–9 June 1935 | Japan | 4–1 | Prague | N/A | Doubles (with Ferenc Maršálek) | Hideo Nishimura / Jiro Yamagishi | 2–6, 6–2, 6–2, 6–1 (W) |
| SF | 7–9 June 1935 | South Africa | 5–0 | Prague | N/A | Singles 2 | Norman Farquharson | 6–2, 5–7, 6–3, 6–2 (W) |
| SF | 7–9 June 1935 | South Africa | 5–0 | Prague | N/A | Doubles (with Ferenc Maršálek) | Norman Farquharson / Vernon Kirby | 9–11, 6–4, 6–2, 6–1 (W) |
| F | 12–14 July 1935 | Germany | 1–4 | Prague | clay | Singles 1 | Henner Henkel | 7–5, 6–1, 4–6, 2–6, 6–4 (W) |
| F | 12–14 July 1935 | Germany | 1–4 | Prague | clay | Doubles (with Ferenc Maršálek) | Kay Lund / Gottfried von Cramm | 3–6, 7–9, 4–6 (L) |
| F | 12–14 July 1935 | Germany | 1–4 | Prague | clay | Singles 4 | Gottfried von Cramm | 2–6, 4–6, 6–3, 7–5, 1–6 (L) |
| 2R | 15–17 May 1937 | Poland | 5–0 | Warsaw | N/A | Singles 1 | Kazimierz Tarlowski | 6–3, 6–4, 2–6, 6–3 (W) |
| 2R | 15–17 May 1937 | Poland | 5–0 | Warsaw | N/A | Singles 4 | Jozef Hebda | 7–5, 6–3, 6–3 (W) |
| QF | 5–7 June 1937 | France | 4–1 | Prague | clay | Singles 1 | Christian Boussus | 6–2, 6–3, 6–4 (W) |
| QF | 5–7 June 1937 | France | 4–1 | Prague | clay | Doubles (with Ladislav Hecht) | Jean Borotra / Yvon Petra | 3–6, 6–2, 2–6, 3–6 (L) |
| QF | 5–7 June 1937 | France | 4–1 | Prague | clay | Singles 4 | Bernard Destremau | 6–0, 6–3, 6–4 (W) |
| SF | 12–14 June 1937 | Yugoslavia | 4–1 | Prague | N/A | Singles 1 | Josip Palada | 6–2, 6–1, 6–0 (W) |
| SF | 12–14 June 1937 | Yugoslavia | 4–1 | Prague | N/A | Doubles (with Ladislav Hecht) | Josip Palada / Franjo Punčec | 2–6, 6–1, 6–0, 7–9, 6–1 (W) |
| F | 10–12 July 1937 | Germany | 1–4 | Berlin | N/A | Singles 2 | Gottfried von Cramm | 6–3, 6–4, 4–6, 3–6, 2–6 (L) |
| 1R | 29 April–1 May 1938 | Yugoslavia | 2–3 | Zagreb | N/A | Singles 2 | Josip Palada | 6–2, 6–2, 6–1 (W) |
| 1R | 29 April–1 May 1938 | Yugoslavia | 2–3 | Zagreb | N/A | Doubles (with František Cejnar) | Dragutin Mitić / Franjo Punčec | 11–9, 3–6, 9–7, 6–2 (W) |
| 1R | 29 April–1 May 1938 | Yugoslavia | 2–3 | Zagreb | N/A | Singles 4 | Franjo Punčec | 6–3, 1–6, 1–6, 2–6 (L) |

=== For Germany ===
Europe Zone
| Round | Date | Opponents | Final match score | Venue | Surface | Match | Opponent | Rubber score |
| 1R | 5–7 May 1939 | Switzerland | 5–0 | Vienna | clay | Singles 1 | Boris Maneff | 6–8, 6–3, 5–7, 6–2, 6–3 (W) |
| 1R | 5–7 May 1939 | Switzerland | 5–0 | Vienna | clay | Singles 5 | Jost Spitzer | 8–6, 6–4, 6–3 (W) |
| 2R | 19–21 May 1939 | Poland | 3–2 | Warsaw | N/A | Singles 1 | Adam Baworowski | 7–5, 6–3, 2–6, 2–6, 6–4 (W) |
| 2R | 19–21 May 1939 | Poland | 3–2 | Warsaw | N/A | Singles 4 | Ignacy Tłoczyński | 6–2, 1–6, 7–5, 2–6, 7–9 (L) |
| QF | 27–29 May 1939 | Sweden | 4–1 | Berlin | clay | Singles 1 | Morgan Hultman | 6–0, 6–2, 6–1 (W) |
| QF | 27–29 May 1939 | Sweden | 4–1 | Berlin | clay | Singles 4 | Kalle Schröder | 2–6, 6–3, 6–3, 6–3 (W) |
| SF | 3–5 June 1939 | Great Britain | 5–0 | Berlin | clay | Singles 1 | Charles Hare | 6–0, 6–1 RET (W) |
| SF | 3–5 June 1939 | Great Britain | 5–0 | Berlin | clay | Singles 4 | Ronald Shayes | 6–1, 6–1, 6–0 (W) |
| F | 28–30 July 1939 | Yugoslavia | 2–3 | Zagreb | N/A | Doubles (with Henner Henkel) | Franjo Kukuljević / Franjo Punčec | 9–7, 4–6, 6–4, 3–6, 6–1 (W) |
