= Johan Haanes =

Norwegian sportsman (1912–2000)

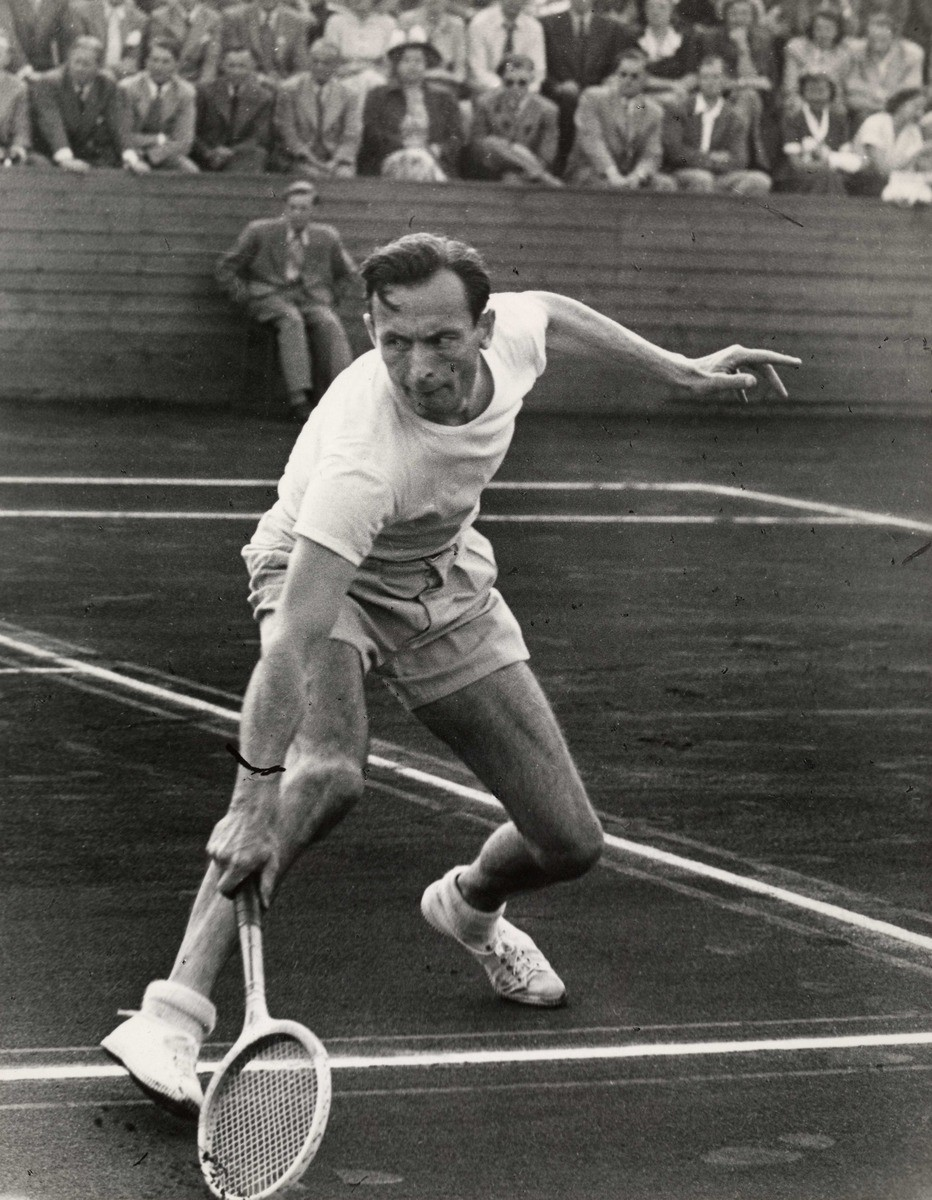

Personal information
- Born: 30 April 1912 Drammen, Norway
- Died: 21 March 2000 (aged 87) Oslo
- Relatives: Sigurd Haanes (brother)
- Awards: Egebergs Ærespris (1937)

Sport
- Country: Norway
- Sport: Tennis; Ski jumping; Bandy; Track and field
- Club: Njård

Johan Clausen Haanes (30 April 1912 – 21 March 2000) was a Norwegian tennis player, ski jumper, bandy player and track and field athlete. He was among Norway's best tennis players of all time.

== Early and personal life ==
Haanes was born in Drammen as the son of businessman Thorgny Haanes and his wife Hedvig Kristine Clausen. He grew up in Aker, along with five brothers. He worked some years in a sports shop, and eventually started his own little sports shop in Oslo in 1936. In 1938 he married Claire Höckert. Several of his brothers were also sportsmen. His brothers Hans Jacob and Thorgny were tennis players, both National Champions in double (with Johan). His brother Sigurd was an excellent ski jumper who placed fourth at the FIS Nordic World Ski Championships 1937. His brother, Reidar Haanes, became an acclaimed sports journalist, who also wrote the book ‘Store dager i norsk idrett’ (1952) and ‘Njårds historie’

== Career ==
Haanes won 39 National titles in tennis from 1932 to 1953. Of these were 21 in single, 13 in double, and five in mixed double. He won one Scandinavian Championship. He played for the club Njård, of which he was a co-founder. He published the book Tennis for alle in 1937. In addition to tennis, Haanes also excelled in ski jumping, high jump and bandy. In 1937 he was awarded Egebergs Ærespris. During the Norwegian Campaign in World War II Haanes participated in the battles of Bagn, Valdres. Later during the German occupation of Norway he was active in the "sports front", and was twice arrested and incarcerated at the Grini concentration camp. First time in 1942 as "hostage", and the second time in 1943, serving nine months for participation in an "illegal" ski competition. His book 1001 tenniskamp, issued in 1942, was subsequently forbidden. Haanes continued his active career after the war. His book Spill bedre tennis was published in 1946. He won his last National Championship in 1953. He was president of Norges Tennisforbund from 1956 to 1958. In 1985 he won an unofficial title at the World Championships for veterans in Marbella. He died in Oslo in 2000.

Preceded by Laila Schou-Nilsen	Egebergs Ærespris; 1937	Succeeded by Henry Johansen
