= Franjo Punčec =

Croatian tennis player

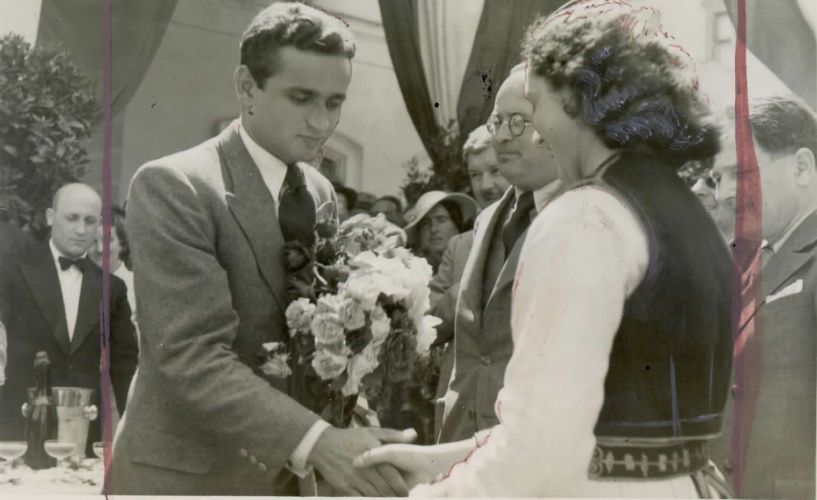
- Punčec in 1936
- Country (sports): Kingdom of Yugoslavia
- Born: 22 November 1913 Čakovec, Croatia-Slavonia, Austria-Hungary
- Died: 5 January 1985 (aged 71) Johannesburg, South Africa
- Turned pro: 1931 (amateur tour)
- Retired: 1950
- Plays: Right-handed

Singles
- Highest ranking: No. 3 (1939, "Sport" Magazine)

Grand Slam singles results
- French Open: SF (1938)
- Wimbledon: SF (1938, 1939)
- US Open: 4R (1938)

Doubles

Grand Slam doubles results
- Wimbledon: QF (1939)

Grand Slam mixed doubles results
- Wimbledon: 4R (1939)

Franjo Punčec (Serbo-Croatian: Фрањо Пунчец; [frǎːɲo pûːntʃěːts]; 25 November 1913 – 5 January 1985) was a Yugoslav tennis player. He played for the Yugoslavian team at the International Lawn Tennis Challenge from 1933 to 1946.

== Early life and family ==
Punčec was born on 25 November 1913 in Čakovec, Austria-Hungary (modern-day Croatia). He started playing tennis at the Čakovec sports club and was coached by Géza Legenstein. He was crowned junior champion of Yugoslavia in 1931. He celebrated his first international match win at the 1931 Hungarian International Championships, over Wilhelm Brosch of Austria, at the age of 17. Though he lost in the second round in singles and first round of mixed doubles, he reached the quarterfinals of the doubles. He was asked to be a line judge at the 1931 Davis Cup tie against Japan Davis Cup team in Zagreb. He then joined the CWC Concordia Zagreb tennis club.

== Tennis career ==
Punčec played for the Kingdom of Yugoslavia Davis Cup team at the International Lawn Tennis Challenge, and later the Davis Cup, from 1933 to 1946. His greatest successes were reaching the semifinals of the French Open in 1938, where he lost against Czechoslovak Roderich Menzel, and reaching the semifinals at Wimbledon, where he lost to American Don Budge that same year. In 1939 he again reached the semifinals at Wimbledon, but lost to American Bobby Riggs. He was the first Croatian ever to be placed in the rankings list, reaching as high as World No. 4 in Gordon Lowe's 1939 amateur rankings. Punčec was also ranked World No. 10 by A. Wallis Myers of The Daily Telegraph in 1938. Sport Magazine of Zürich ranked him first in the European rankings and third in the World's top ten.

In 1933 Punčec fell in the semifinal of the Italian International Championships to eventual winner Emanuele Sertorio in three straight sets. The following year, he returned to the tournament and was more successful in the mixed doubles, partnering Madzy Rollin Couquerque; they ceded the title match victory to Dorothy Andrus and André Martin-Legeay.

In 1935 he traveled to India, where he clinched the Madras and Punjab city titles. The following year, he became the champion of Cape Town.

In 1937 Punčec won the Paris International tournament and bested Kho Sin-Kie in four sets. The same year, he reached the semifinal of the singles of the Tennis Napoli Cup and the quarterfinals in the doubles. He also won tournaments in Venice and in Båstad.

In 1938 Punčec won the Monte Carlo international tournament and the International Championship of Scandinavia. On the French Riviera, he won the Beaulieu tournament after back-to-back victories over Bunny Austin and František Cejnar. According to John Bromwich, he was ranked 8th in the world that year.

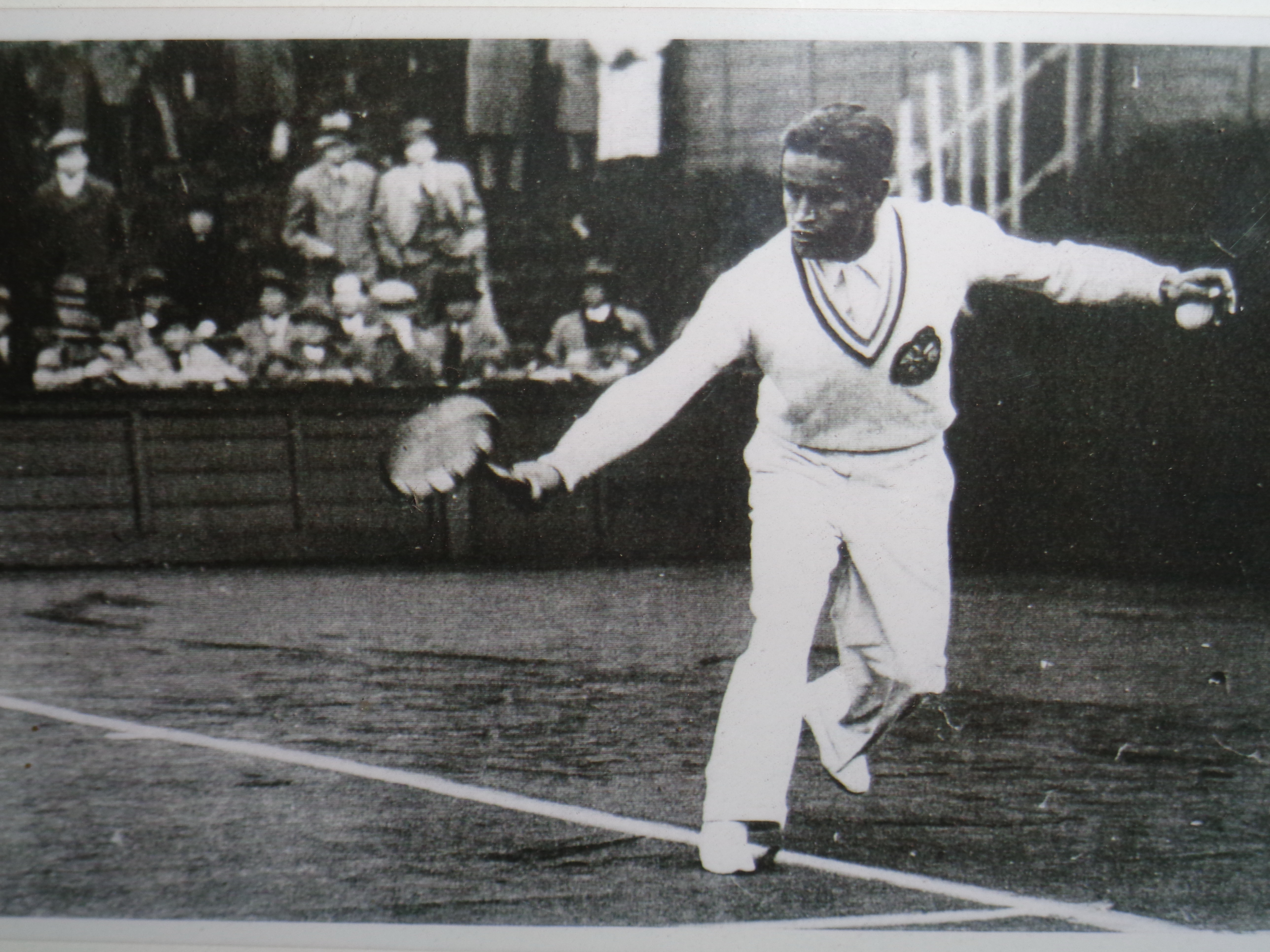
Franjo Punčec in action

In 1939 he was a runner-up for the Pacific Southwest Championship, losing to John Bromwich in what described as the best match of the tournament. According to Bromwich, he was ranked 5th in the world that year.

During World War II the Davis Cup was suspended and Yugoslavia was dissolved. Punčec joined the newly formed Croatian Tennis Association. Apart from the Davis Cup, he played for the Rome Cup and Danube Cup (substitutes for an international team competition). He last represented the Kingdom of Yugoslavia in a friendly match against Hungary, which ended up in a tie. In 1941 he was ranked sixth on the list of European rankings. He represented Croatia in 1942 against Hungary in Budapest, which also ended in a tie. He played only an exhibition match at the meeting.

In 1943 it was reported that Punčec was planning to change nationality and join the Hungarian tennis ranks, although the rumor was unconfirmed.

Punčec returned to tennis in 1946 to represent Yugoslavia in the Davis Cup. The match inaugurated the upgraded Stade Roland Garros, which had a sold-out crowd of 12,000. The French team kicked off with a 2–0 lead after the first two singles. Both players were so unfocused that Dragutin Mitić made six foot faults on serve, while Punčec botched four. In the doubles, Bernard Destremau and Pierre Pellizza were leading 7–6 in the fifth deciding set when the Yugoslavian pair turned the tide and delivered a 10–8 victory. Mitić equaled the tally with his singles win the next day. The decider was fought between Yvon Petra and Punčec. It was a "collision of playing styles" as Petra approached the net frequently while Punčec operated with passing shots. Punčec led through five sets, not allowing his opponent to even hold his serve. During the final game, the Yugoslavs missed four match points but converted the fifth, winning the match and Punčec's last team victory.

== Personal ==
In Yugoslavia Punčec worked as a state official. In 1943 he married Zora Punčec (1927–2012) and moved to South Africa with her in 1948. They had three children, Frank, Victor, and Sylvia. The sons were also involved in tennis and Frank was featured in the singles main draw of the 1983 French Open; he was ranked 179th in the world.

== Gallery ==
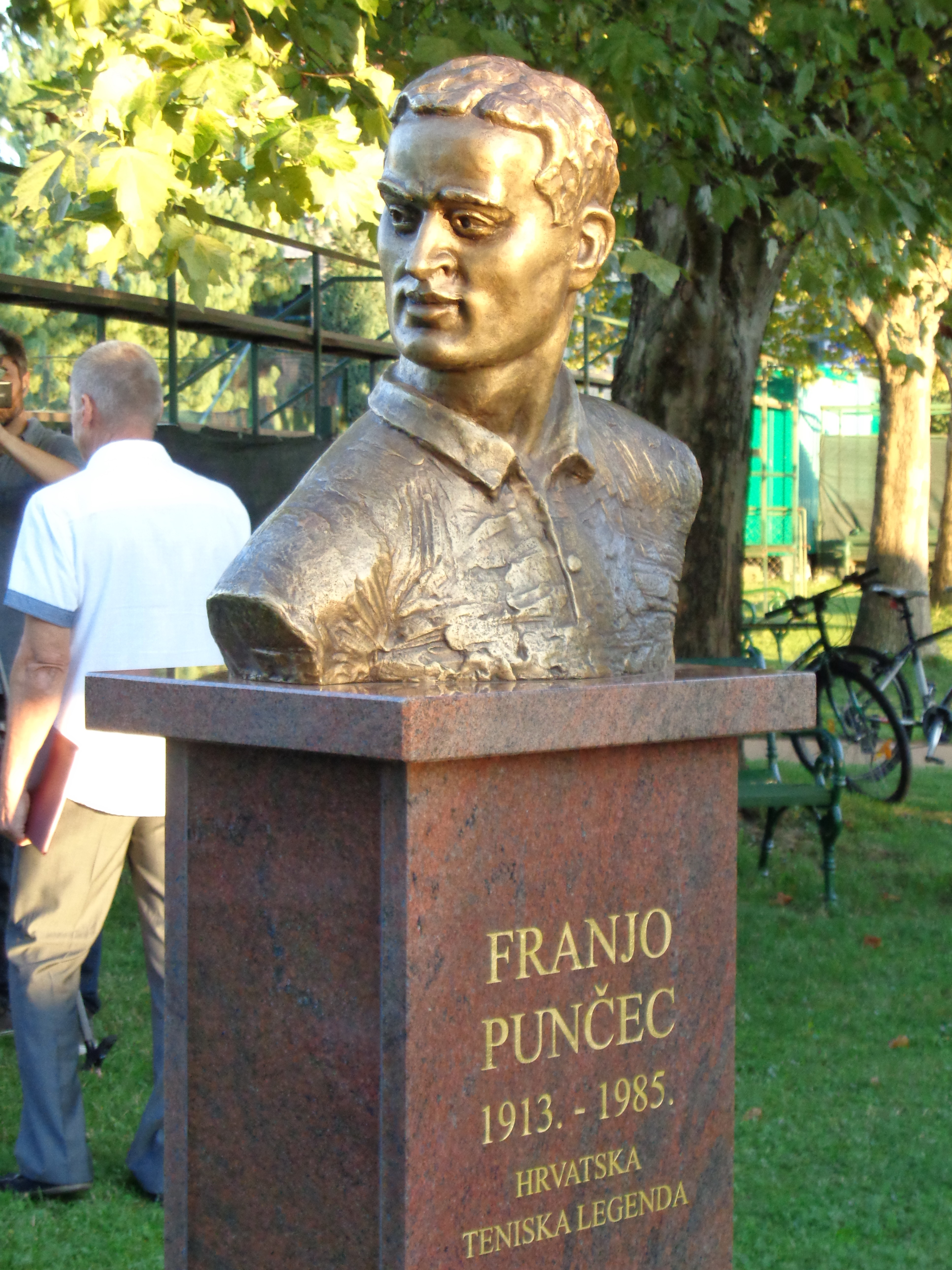
Bust of Franjo Punčec in Čakovec, his home town

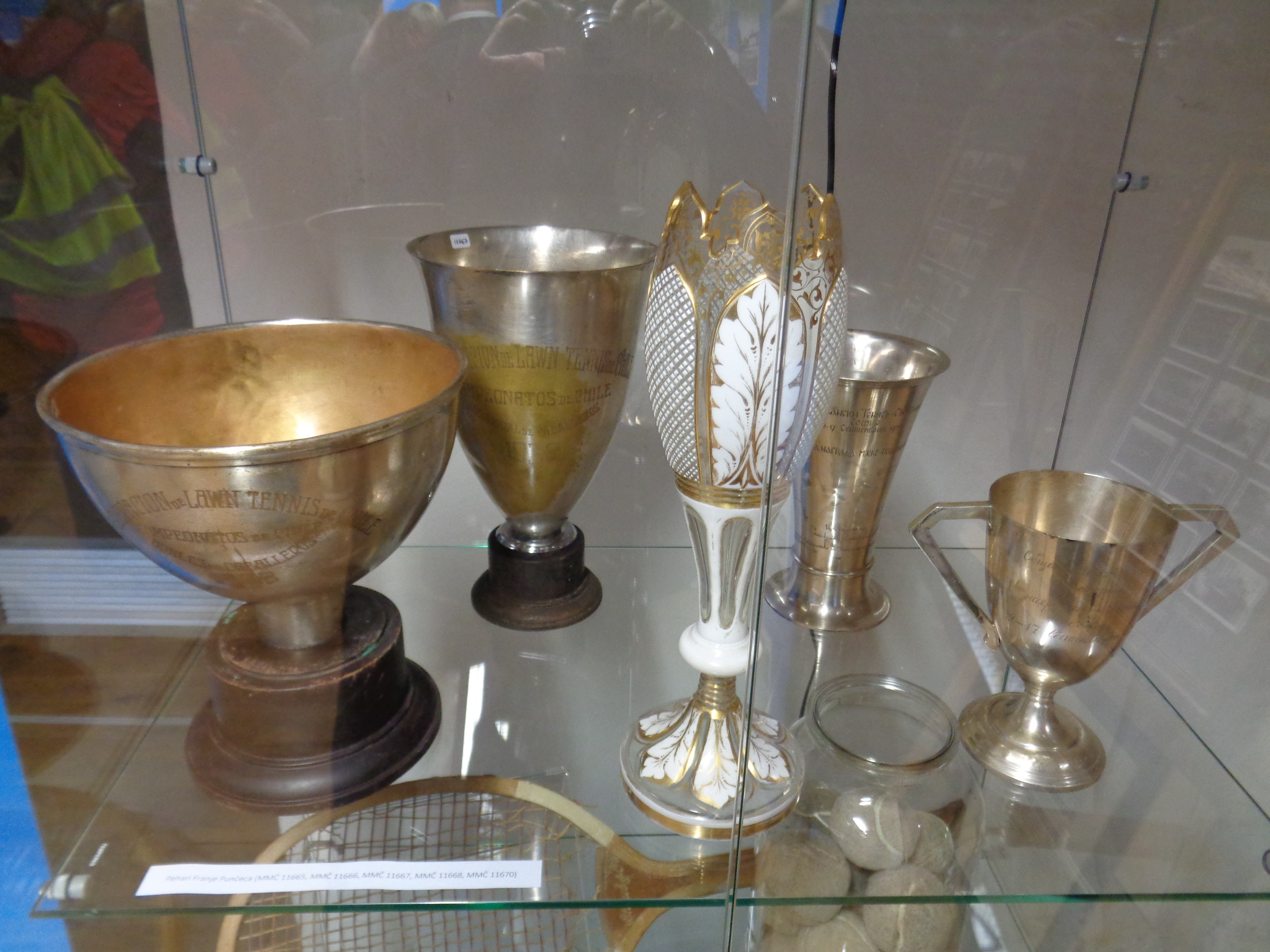
Some of Punčec's tennis cup trophies in the Međimurje County Museum

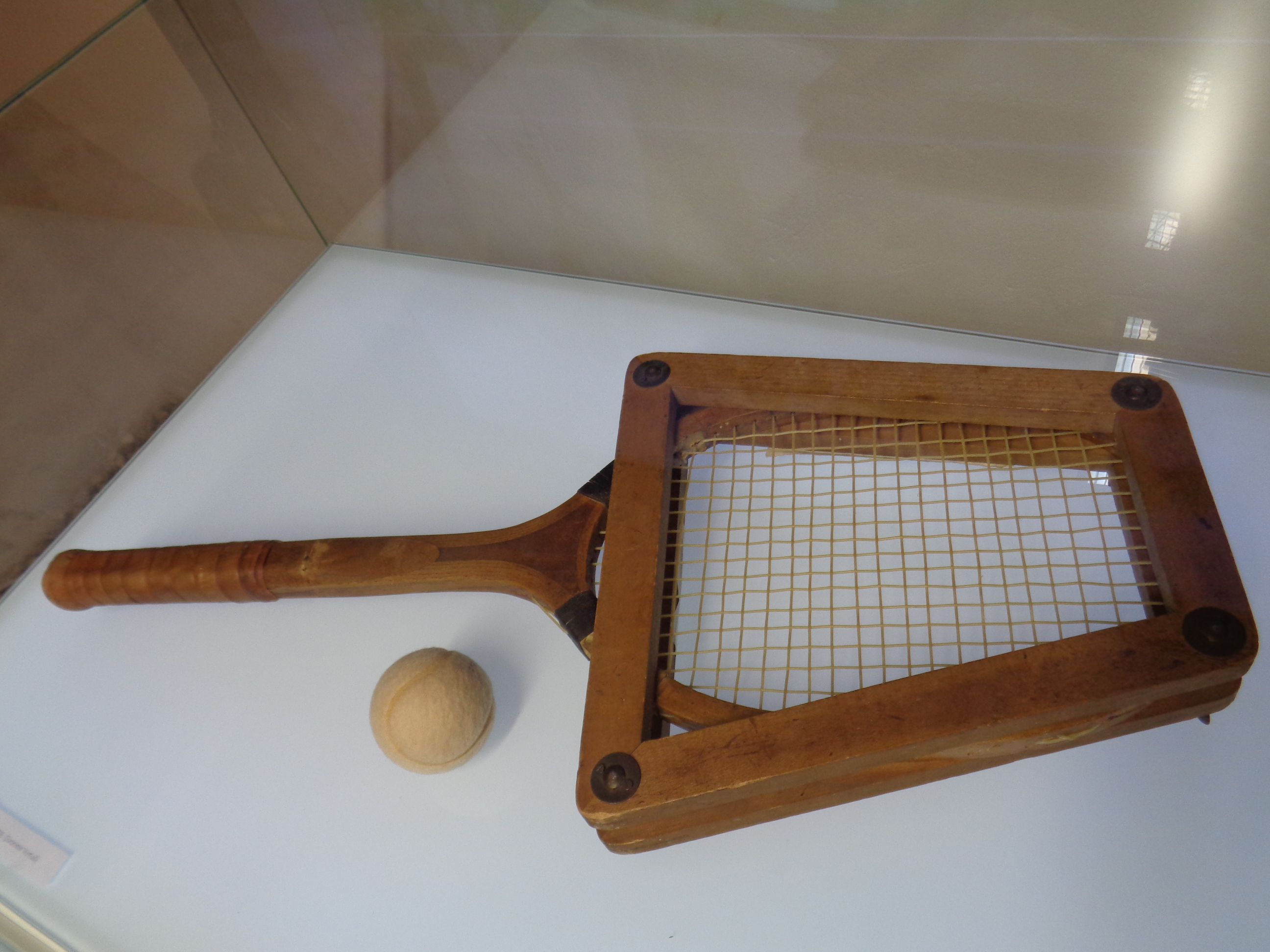
Racket of Punčec in a wooden frame

== Works cited ==
=== Primary ===
- Šoškić, Čedomir (2012). Тениски савез Србије Тенис без граници 1922–2012. [Tennis Association of Serbia, Tennis without borders 1922–2012] (PDF) (in Serbian). Belgrade, Serbia: Tennis Association of Serbia. pp. 262, 266–272. Archived from the original (PDF) on 30 December 2013.

=== Secondary ===
- "Norddeutscher Lloyd passenger list". die-maus-bremen.de (in German). Bremen, Germany: Chamber of Commerce and the State Archive of Bremen. 11 August 1939.
- "Puncec". i-notice.co.za. Johannesburg, South Africa: The Star. 15 October 2012. Archived from the original on 4 March 2016.
- Béla Kehrling, ed. (1 October 1931). "Magyarország tenniszbajnokságai" [Hungarian Championships] (PDF). Tennisz és Golf (in Hungarian). III (18–19). Budapest, Hungary: Egyesült Kő-, Könyvnyomda, Könyv- és Lapkiadó Rt: 356–361.
- "Franjo Puncec croatian tennis player striker state". thebestincroatia.info. Zagreb, Croatia: Abak Ltd. Archived from the original on 4 March 2016.
- "photo of King Gustav V and Franjo Puncec". abebooks.com. Abe Books.
- "Lawn Tennis tournaments". The Straits Times. Singapore: 14. 28 September 1937.
- Lobasso, Marco (2005). "Tennis Club Napoli 1905-2005" (PDF) (in Italian). Naples, Italy: Tennis Club Napoli. pp. 203–204. Archived from the original (PDF) on 5 March 2016.
- "Sertorio in finale agli Internazionali d'Italia" [Sertorio in the final Italian Internationals]. Corriere della Sera (in Italian). Milan, Italy: A. Rizzoli & Co. 12 May 1933. Archived from the original on 30 December 2013.
- "Tennis win for Bromwich". The Argus (29, 053). Melbourne, Australia: Argus Office: 3. 4 October 1939.
- "Albo d'Oro Doppio Misto" [Hall of Fame mixed doubles]. Rome, Italy: Federazione Italiana Tennis. 2009. Archived from the original on 3 March 2016.
- "3:3-ra végződött jugoszláv-magyar válogatott teniszmérkőzés" [Yugoslavia-Hungary ended in 3:3] (in Hungarian). Budapest, Hungary: Huszadik század. September 1940.
- "Izgalmas küzdelem után döntetlenül végződött a horvát-magyar teniszmérkőzés" [Croatia-Hungary ended in a tie after a fascinating battle] (in Hungarian). Budapest, Hungary: Huszadik század. July 1942.
- "europeesche ranglijst" [European rankings]. Algemeen Nederlands Persbureau (in Dutch). Rijswijk, Netherlands: Association of Dutch Newspapers (NDP): 32. 31 December 1941.
- "puncec wordt hongaar" [Puncec will become Hungarian]. Algemeen Nederlands Persbureau (in Dutch). Rijswijk, Netherlands: Association of Dutch Newspapers (NDP): 22. 28 January 1943.
- John Bromwich (24 May 1946). "Players Also Observers at Wimbledon". The Sydney Morning Herald. 116 (33, 827): 9.
- Daviscup.com. "Franjo Punčec profile". London, Great Britain: International Tennis Federation.
- atpworldtour.com. "Frank Punčec profile". London, Great Britain: ATP Tour, Inc.
