= 1936 French Championships – Men's singles =

Men's singles
- 1936 French Championships

Final
- Champion: (Germany) Gottfried von Cramm
- Runner-up: (United Kingdom) Fred Perry
- Score: 6–0, 2–6, 6–2, 2–6, 6–0

Details
- Seeds: 16

Events
Singles	men	women
Doubles	men	women
← 1935 ·	French Championships	· 1937 →

Gottfried von Cramm defeated Fred Perry 6–0, 2–6, 6–2, 2–6, 6–0 in the final to win the men's singles tennis title at the 1936 French Championships.

== Seeds ==
The seeded players are listed below. Gottfried von Cramm is the champion; others show the round in which they were eliminated.

1. (United Kingdom) Fred Perry (finalist)
2. (Germany) Gottfried von Cramm (champion)
3. (United Kingdom) Bunny Austin (quarterfinals)
4. (France) Christian Boussus (semifinals)
5. (Germany) Henner Henkel (third round)
6. (France) Marcel Bernard (semifinals)
7. (France) Bernard Destremau (quarterfinals)
8. (Republic of China (1912–1949)) Kho Sin-Kie (fourth round)
9. (Germany) Kay Lund (third round)
10. (United Kingdom) Frank Herbert David Wilde (second round)
11. (Kingdom of Yugoslavia) Dragutin Mitić (first round)
12. (United Kingdom) Charles Edgar Hare (fourth round)
13. (Poland) Adam Baworowski (fourth round)
14. (Austria) Georg Von Metaxa (third round)
15. (France) Jacques Brugnon (second round)
16. (France) André Martin-Legeay (fourth round)

== Draw ==
=== Key ===
- Q = Qualifier
- WC = Wild card
- LL = Lucky loser
- r = Retired

=== Finals ===
Quarterfinals
1	(United Kingdom) Fred Perry	9	6	4	6
(Switzerland) Boris Maneff	7	3	6	3
4	(France) Christian Boussus	1	6	7	1	6
(France) André Merlin	6	3	5	6	1
6	(France) Marcel Bernard	4	1
3	(United Kingdom) Bunny Austin	6	0^{r}
7	(France) Bernard Destremau	3	2	4
2	(Germany) Gottfried von Cramm	6	6	6

Semifinals
1	(United Kingdom) Fred Perry	6	7	5	6
4	(France) Christian Boussus	4	5	7	2
6	(France) Marcel Bernard	5	1	1
2	(Germany) Gottfried von Cramm	7	6	6

Final
1	(United Kingdom) Fred Perry	0	6	2	6	0
2	(Germany) Gottfried von Cramm	6	2	6	2	6

=== Earlier rounds ===
==== Section 1 ====
First round

Second round
1	(United Kingdom) Perry	7	8	9
(France) George	5	6	7
(United Kingdom) Hadingham	2	1	1
(France) Terrier	6	6	6
16	(France) Martin-Legeay	3	6	6	6
(United States) Robertson	6	1	0	0
(France) Goldryn
(Czechoslovakia) Siba

Third round
1	(United Kingdom) Perry	6	6	6
(France) Terrier	0	4	4
16	(France) Martin-Legeay	6	6	6
(France) Goldryn	2	0	2

Fourth round
1	(United Kingdom) Perry	6	6	0	6
16	(France) Martin-Legeay	2	3	6	3

==== Section 2 ====
First round

Second round
(France) Lesueur	7	3	1	7	4
8	(Republic of China (1912–1949)) Kho	5	6	6	5	6
(Canada) Murray
(Kingdom of Yugoslavia) Punčec
9	(Germany) Lund	6	0	6	6
(France) Vieillard	1	6	3	4
(France) Rimet	1	6	1	6	2
(Switzerland) Maneff	6	4	6	4	6

Third round
8	(Republic of China (1912–1949)) Kho	6	6	6
(Canada) Murray	2	3	4
9	(Germany) Lund	3	6	6	1	2
(Switzerland) Maneff	6	0	4	6	6

Fourth round
8	(Republic of China (1912–1949)) Kho	5	3	7	6	4
(Switzerland) Maneff	7	6	5	2	6

==== Section 3 ====
First round

Second round
4	(France) Boussus	6	6	6
Ritossa	3	1	3
(Argentina) Zappa	8	6	8	6
(Monaco) Galeppe	10	2	6	1
13	(Poland) Baworowski	7	8	6
(France) Weiss	5	6	4
Hebda
(France) Sanglier

Third round
4	(France) Boussus	6	8	6
(Argentina) Zappa	1	6	3
13	(Poland) Baworowski	6	6	6
(France) Sanglier	3	1	0

Fourth round
4	(France) Boussus	4	6	6	6
13	(Poland) Baworowski	6	4	0	4

==== Section 4 ====
First round
(France) Merlin	8	6	6	6
(Denmark) Sperling	10	0	1	2
12	(United Kingdom) Hare	7	6	6
(France) Gentien	5	0	2
(France) Chevallier	2	4	4
(Kingdom of Yugoslavia) Kukuljević	6	6	6
(France) Glasser	5	6	3	2
(Belgium) Geelhand De Merxem	7	4	6	6
(France) Petra	6	3	0	1
(Switzerland) Fisher	2	6	6	6

Second round
5	(Germany) Henkel	6	6	6
(France) Merlin	0	1	1
(France) Berthet	6	4	1	4
(France) Merlin	3	6	6	6
12	(United Kingdom) Hare	6	6	3	6	6
(Kingdom of Yugoslavia) Kukuljević	3	8	6	3	4
(Belgium) Geelhand De Merxem	0	2	2
(Switzerland) Fisher	6	6	6

Third round
5	(Germany) Henkel	5	4	6	6
(France) Merlin	7	6	2	8
12	(United Kingdom) Hare	4	3	7	6	8
(Switzerland) Fisher	6	6	5	2	6

Fourth round
(France) Merlin	6	5	6	6
12	(United Kingdom) Hare	3	7	3	4

==== Section 5 ====
First round
(France) Journu	7	8	6	6
11	(Kingdom of Yugoslavia) Mitić	5	10	4	1
(Beiyang government) Lum	7	0	2	1
(France) Goldschmidt	5	6	6	6
(Greece) Nicolaides	1	5	6	1
(France) Landry	6	7	1	6
(France) Jamain	6	6	6
(Switzerland) Ellmer	1	4	3
(France) Pellizza	6	9	6
(Monaco) Landau	2	7	3
(France) Troncin
(Poland) Tloczynski

Second round
(France) Journu	6	7	6
(France) Goldschmidt	4	5	4
(France) Landry	2	6	4	7	6
(France) Jamain	6	2	6	5	0
(France) Pellizza	6	6	6
(France) Troncin	4	2	1
Le Hun Ly
6	(France) Bernard

Third round
(France) Journu	4	6	1	6	6
(France) Landry	6	3	6	4	4
(France) Pellizza	5	1	0
6	(France) Bernard	7	6	6

Fourth round
(France) Journu	2	6	6	9	7
6	(France) Bernard	6	3	2	11	9

==== Section 6 ====
First round

Second round
Wait	1	3	1
(France) Feret	6	6	6
(France) Langanay	6	3	7	1	2
14	(Austria) Von Metaxa	4	6	5	6	6
(United Kingdom) Witt	1	0	0^{r}
(Argentina) Del Castillo	6	6	1
(France) Du Plaix
3	(United Kingdom) Austin

Third round
(France) Feret	6	6	6
14	(Austria) Von Metaxa	3	1	0
(Argentina) Del Castillo	7	1	2
3	(United Kingdom) Austin	9	6	6

Fourth round
(France) Feret	6	2	5	6	2
3	(United Kingdom) Austin	3	6	7	1	6

==== Section 7 ====
First round

Second round
(France) Bolelli
(Czechoslovakia) Malacek
(France) Rodel	6	6	3	6
10	(United Kingdom) Wilde	1	3	6	4
(France) Billaudot	5	3	1
(Belgium) Van Den Eynde	7	6	6
Patterson	2	1	0
7	(France) Destremau	6	6	6

Third round
(France) Bolelli	7	1	1	3
(France) Rodel	5	6	6	6
(Belgium) Van Den Eynde	4	1	5
7	(France) Destremau	6	6	7

Fourth round
(France) Rodel	4	2	5
7	(France) Destremau	6	6	7

==== Section 8 ====
First round

Second round
(France) Lecointre
(Kingdom of Yugoslavia) Pallada
15	(France) Brugnon
(Greece) Stalios
(Switzerland) Steiner	3	6	3	6	6
(France) Chevalier	6	2	6	2	1
(Switzerland) Mercier-Odier	1	4	3
2	(Germany) von Cramm	6	6	6

Third round
(France) Lecointre	5	4	5
(Greece) Stalios	7	6	7
(Switzerland) Steiner	0	0	1
2	(Germany) von Cramm	6	6	6

Fourth round
(Greece) Stalios	3	1	2
2	(Germany) von Cramm	6	6	6

Preceded by 1936 Australian Championships – Men's singles	Grand Slam men's singles	Succeeded by 1936 Wimbledon Championships – Men's singles
