= 1937 French Championships – Men's singles =

Men's singles
- 1937 French Championships

Final
- Champion: (Germany) Henner Henkel
- Runner-up: (United Kingdom) Bunny Austin
- Score: 6–1, 6–4, 6–3

Details
- Seeds: 16

Events
Singles	men	women
Doubles	men	women
← 1936 ·	French Championships	· 1938 →

Henner Henkel defeated Bunny Austin 6–1, 6–4, 6–3 in the final to win the men's singles tennis title at the 1937 French Championships.

== Seeds ==
The seeded players are listed below. Henner Henkel is the champion; others show the round in which they were eliminated.

1. (United Kingdom) Bunny Austin (finalist)
2. (France) Bernard Destremau (semifinals)
3. (Germany) Henner Henkel (champion)
4. (Austria) Georg Von Metaxa (third round)
5. (Italy) Giorgio de Stefani (third round)
6. (France) Paul Feret (fourth round)
7. (Czechoslovakia) Josef Caska (third round)
8. (United States) Charles R. Harris (third round)
9. (France) André Merlin (fourth round)
10. (Republic of China (1912–1949)) Kho Sin-Kie (third round)
11. (United Kingdom) Patrick Hughes (quarterfinals)
12. (Czechoslovakia) Frantisek Cejnar (quarterfinals)
13. (South Africa) Vernon Kirby (third round)
14. (France) Marcel Bernard (third round)
15. (Poland) Adam Baworowski (fourth round)
16. (Poland) Józef Hebda (third round)

== Draw ==
=== Key ===
- Q = Qualifier
- WC = Wild card
- LL = Lucky loser
- r = Retired

=== Finals ===
Quarterfinals
1	(United Kingdom) Bunny Austin	6	6	6
(France) Yvon Petra	4	2	1
(France) Christian Boussus	6	6	6
12	(Czechoslovakia) Frantisek Cejnar	2	2	1
11	(United Kingdom) Patrick Hughes	3	4	2
3	(Germany) Henner Henkel	6	6	6
(United Kingdom) Charles Hare	9	6	9	5	5
2	(France) Bernard Destremau	11	4	7	7	7

Semifinals
1	(United Kingdom) Bunny Austin	7	6	1	6
(France) Christian Boussus	5	2	6	3
3	(Germany) Henner Henkel	6	6	6
2	(France) Bernard Destremau	1	4	3

Final
1	(United Kingdom) Bunny Austin	1	4	3
3	(Germany) Henner Henkel	6	6	6

=== Earlier rounds ===
==== Section 1 ====
First round

Second round
1	(United Kingdom) Austin	5	6	6	6
(France) Rodel	7	0	3	4
(Switzerland) Maneff	6	6	8
(France) Troncin	3	1	6
16	(Poland) Hebda	6	6	6
(France) Papillon	4	4	3
(France) Lesueur
(United States) Harman

Third round
1	(United Kingdom) Austin	7	6	6
(Switzerland) Maneff	5	1	2
16	(Poland) Hebda	8	3	5	5
(France) Lesueur	6	6	7	7

Fourth round
1	(United Kingdom) Austin
(France) Lesueur

==== Section 2 ====
First round

Second round
8	(United States) Harris
(Netherlands) Karsten
(France) Petra	6	6	6
(Republic of China (1912–1949)) Tsui Wai Pui	2	3	1
9	(France) Merlin	7	7	10
(Belgium) Naeyaert	5	5	8
4	(Austria) Von Metaxa
(France) Bolelli

Third round
8	(United States) Harris	5	6	6	2
(France) Petra	7	8	3	6
9	(France) Merlin	6	5	6	6
4	(Austria) Von Metaxa	4	7	2	3

Fourth round
(France) Petra	10	7	6	6
9	(France) Merlin	12	5	1	4

==== Section 3 ====
First round
(Netherlands) Van Swol
(Denmark) Sperling
13	(South Africa) Kirby	6	6	6
(France) Rimet	3	4	4
(Kingdom of Yugoslavia) Kukuljević
(France) Glasser
(France) Gentien	6	5	6	7
(Italy) Quintavalle	2	7	4	5
(United Kingdom) Wilde	6	6	6
(France) Gourovitch	4	4	3

Second round
(France) Boussus	6	6	6
(France) Vieillard	1	1	4
(Poland) Tarlowski	1	8	4	6	5
(Netherlands) Van Swol	6	6	6	2	7
13	(South Africa) Kirby	5	6	8	2	6
(Kingdom of Yugoslavia) Kukuljević	7	2	6	6	3
(France) Gentien	6	3	6	6
(United Kingdom) Wilde	2	6	1	2

Third round
(France) Boussus	7	6	6
(Netherlands) Van Swol	5	3	3
13	(South Africa) Kirby	6	2	2	1
(France) Gentien	1	6	6	6

Fourth round
(France) Boussus	6	7	4	6
(France) Gentien	3	5	6	1

==== Section 4 ====
First round
5	(Italy) de Stefani	6	6	6
(France) Goldryn	2	0	1
(Monaco) Galeppe	6	2	6	6
(France) Dessair	3	6	3	4
(France) Journu	6	6	4	6
(South Africa) Eedes	2	2	6	1
(Belgium) Geelhand De Merxem	6	3	6	2	3
(Monaco) Landau	3	6	1	6	6
12	(Czechoslovakia) Cejnar	6	6	6
(France) Sanglier	4	0	3
(Switzerland) Billeter	6	4	8	1	1
(France) Combemale	3	6	6	6	6
(France) Brugnon	6	6	2	3	6
(Italy) Cavriani	2	4	6	6	1
(Republic of China (1912–1949)) Choy
(France) Chevalier

Second round
5	(Italy) de Stefani	6	9	6
(Monaco) Galeppe	2	7	1
(France) Journu	6	3	6	6
(Monaco) Landau	4	6	2	4
12	(Czechoslovakia) Cejnar	6	6	5	6
(France) Combemale	1	4	7	4
(France) Brugnon	2	8	6	6
(Republic of China (1912–1949)) Choy	6	6	4	3

Third round
5	(Italy) de Stefani	5	2	1
(France) Journu	7	6	6
12	(Czechoslovakia) Cejnar	6	6	4	6
(France) Brugnon	3	3	6	2

Fourth round
(France) Journu	0	4	1
12	(Czechoslovakia) Cejnar	6	6	6

==== Section 5 ====
First round
(United Kingdom) Hadingham	0	2	1
(New Zealand) Coombe	6	6	6
(Greece) Stalios	4	2	2
(France) Jamain	6	6	6
(France) Du Plaix	6	6	6	6
(Switzerland) Billeter	2	8	4	3
(Italy) Taroni	6	4	2	0
11	(United Kingdom) Hughes	3	6	6	6
(France) Weiss	4	4	2
(United Kingdom) Shayes	6	6	6
(France) Terrier	3	7	5
(South Africa) Farquharson	6	9	7
(Kingdom of Yugoslavia) Mitić
(France) Goldschmidt
(United States) Frame	4	5	5
6	(France) Feret	6	7	7

Second round
(New Zealand) Coombe	2	6	6	4	2
(France) Jamain	6	3	3	6	6
(France) Du Plaix	2	3	1
11	(United Kingdom) Hughes	6	6	6
(United Kingdom) Shayes	0	1	3
(South Africa) Farquharson	6	6	6
(Kingdom of Yugoslavia) Mitić	0	3	8	3
6	(France) Feret	6	6	6	6

Third round
(France) Jamain	5	1	3
11	(United Kingdom) Hughes	7	6	6
(South Africa) Farquharson	4	4	6	3
6	(France) Feret	6	6	4	6

Fourth round
11	(United Kingdom) Hughes	6	7	4	7
6	(France) Feret	2	5	6	5

==== Section 6 ====
First round
(France) Lecointre	3	7	7	4
(Poland) Tłoczyński	6	5	9	6
(France) Barrelet De Ricou
(United Kingdom) Tuckey
(South Africa) Robertson	7	1	6	3	12
(South Africa) Fannin	5	6	3	6	10
(India) Maharaja Of Kutch
14	(France) Bernard

Second round
(Poland) Tloczynski	3	2	6	2
(United Kingdom) Tuckey	6	6	3	6
(South Africa) Robertson	6	1	4
14	(France) Bernard	8	6	6
(Netherlands) Teschmacher	6	4	7	1
(France) Pellizza	4	6	9	6
(France) Langanay	1	3	2
3	(Germany) Henkel	6	6	6

Third round
(United Kingdom) Tuckey	6	6	6
14	(France) Bernard	1	3	3
(France) Pellizza	2	2	1
3	(Germany) Henkel	6	6	6

Fourth round
(United Kingdom) Tuckey	3	6	1	3
3	(Germany) Henkel	6	2	6	6

==== Section 7 ====
First round

Second round
(France) Berthet	3	3	4
(United Kingdom) Hare	6	6	6
(Switzerland) Mercier-Odier	3	2	3
10	(Republic of China (1912–1949)) Kho	6	6	6
(France) Abdesselam	3	5	5
(United States) Surface	6	7	7
(France) Geraud	6	3	2	1
7	(Czechoslovakia) Caska	3	6	6	6

Third round
(United Kingdom) Hare	6	4	6	4	6
10	(Republic of China (1912–1949)) Kho	4	6	3	6	2
(United States) Surface	8	6	6
7	(Czechoslovakia) Caska	6	4	1

Fourth round
(United Kingdom) Hare	6	6	6
(United States) Surface	4	1	2

==== Section 8 ====
First round

Second round
(Italy) Scotti
(France) Martin-Legeay
(France) Poles	1	0	2
15	(Poland) Baworowski	6	6	6
Dry	1	3	1
(Italy) Canepele	6	6	6
(Belgium) Moreau	2	5	3
2	(France) Destremau	6	7	6

Third round
(France) Martin-Legeay	1	6	2	r
15	(Poland) Baworowski	6	3	6
(Italy) Canepele	5	1	1
2	(France) Destremau	7	6	6

Fourth round
15	(Poland) Baworowski	4	5	3
2	(France) Destremau	6	7	6

Preceded by 1937 Australian Championships – Men's singles	Grand Slam men's singles	Succeeded by 1937 Wimbledon Championships – Men's singles
