= 1938 French Championships – Men's singles =

Men's singles
- 1938 French Championships

Final
- Champion: (United States) Don Budge
- Runner-up: (Czechoslovakia) Roderich Menzel
- Score: 6–3, 6–2, 6–4

Details
- Seeds: 16

Events
Singles	men	women
Doubles	men	women
← 1937 ·	French Championships	· 1939 →

Don Budge defeated Roderich Menzel 6–3, 6–2, 6–4 in the final to win the men's singles tennis title at the 1938 French Championships.

== Seeds ==
The seeded players are listed below. Donald J. Budge is the champion; others show the round in which they were eliminated.

1. (United States) Don Budge (champion)
2. (Kingdom of Yugoslavia) Franjo Punčec (semifinals)
3. (Czechoslovakia) Roderich Menzel (finalist)
4. (France) Christian Boussus (quarterfinals)
5. (Czechoslovakia) Ladislav Hecht (fourth round)
6. (France) Yvon Petra (first round)
7. (United States) Gene Mako (third round)
8. (France) Bernard Destremau (quarterfinals)
9. (Poland) Adam Baworowski (fourth round)
10. (Czechoslovakia) Frantisek Cejnar (quarterfinals)
11. (Kingdom of Yugoslavia) Dragutin Mitić (quarterfinals)
12. (Kingdom of Yugoslavia) Josip Palada (semifinals)
13. (United States) Owen Anderson (fourth round)
14. (United States) William Robertson (first round)
15. (France) André Martin-Legeay (second round)
16. (Kingdom of Yugoslavia) Franjo Kukuljević (fourth round)

== Draw ==
=== Key ===
- Q = Qualifier
- WC = Wild card
- LL = Lucky loser
- r = Retired

=== Finals ===
Quarterfinals
1	(United States) Don Budge	6	6	6
8	(France) Bernard Destremau	4	3	4
4	(France) Christian Boussus	1	6	6	1	2
12	(Kingdom of Yugoslavia) Josip Palada	6	3	4	6	6
11	(Kingdom of Yugoslavia) Dragutin Mitić	0	0	1
3	(Czechoslovakia) Roderich Menzel	6	6	6
10	(Czechoslovakia) Frantisek Cejnar	6	3	2	3
2	(Kingdom of Yugoslavia) Franjo Punčec	3	6	6	6

Semifinals
1	(United States) Don Budge	6	6	6
12	(Kingdom of Yugoslavia) Josip Palada	2	3	3
3	(Czechoslovakia) Roderich Menzel	6	6	6
2	(Kingdom of Yugoslavia) Franjo Punčec	4	4	4

Final
1	(United States) Don Budge	6	6	6
3	(Czechoslovakia) Roderich Menzel	3	2	4

=== Earlier rounds ===
==== Section 1 ====
First round

Second round
1	(United States) Budge	6	6	6
(France) Gentien	1	2	4
(India) Mohammad	3	4	6	6	6
(France) Glasser	6	6	4	3	0
(France) George
(United States) Nelson
(France) Du Plaix	2	1	1
16	(Kingdom of Yugoslavia) Kukuljević	6	6	6

Third round
1	(United States) Budge	6	6	5	6
(India) Mohammad	1	1	7	0
(United States) Nelson	2	0	2
16	(Kingdom of Yugoslavia) Kukuljević	6	6	6

Fourth round
1	(United States) Budge	6	8	2	1	6
16	(Kingdom of Yugoslavia) Kukuljević	2	6	6	6	1

==== Section 2 ====
First round

Second round
8	(France) Destremau
(Italy) de Stefani
(United Kingdom) Shayes	5	3	6	6
(Japan) Kuramitsu	7	6	4	8
(France) Berthet	1	7	1	1
9	(Poland) Baworowski	6	5	6	6
(France) Chevallier
(Denmark) Panker

Third round
8	(France) Destremau	7	6	6
(Japan) Kuramitsu	5	1	3
9	(Poland) Baworowski
(Denmark) Panker

Fourth round
8	(France) Destremau	5	4	7	6	6
9	(Poland) Baworowski	7	6	5	2	4

==== Section 3 ====
First round
(France) Tiberghien
(France) Jamain
(France) Bonte	5	6	6	6
(Monaco) Gallèpe	7	0	2	1
(Egypt) Bogdadly	2	3	6	7	3
(France) Catteau	6	6	1	5	6
(Germany) Dohnal	6	5	2	0
(France) Brugnon	3	7	6	6
(France) Pellizza	3	3	5
13	(United States) Anderson	6	6	7

Second round
4	(France) Boussus	4	6	0	6	7
(Hungary) Szigeti	6	1	6	1	5
(United Kingdom) Avory	4	1	2
(France) Jamain	6	6	6
(France) Bonte	4	1	6	2
(France) Catteau	6	6	1	6
(France) Brugnon	5	6	1	4
13	(United States) Anderson	7	4	6	6

Third round
4	(France) Boussus	6	6	6
(France) Jamain	2	0	2
(France) Catteau	1	8	6	1
13	(United States) Anderson	6	10	2	6

Fourth round
4	(France) Boussus	6	6	6
13	(United States) Anderson	4	0	2

==== Section 4 ====
First round
5	(Czechoslovakia) Hecht	6	6	6
(Japan) Abe	2	2	2
(United Kingdom) Filby	6	6	3	4
(Netherlands) Van Swol	4	8	6	6
(Norway) Beer	2	3	4
(United Kingdom) Wilde	6	6	6
(Uruguay) Harreguy	6	6	6
(United Kingdom) Davidson	2	3	0
12	(Kingdom of Yugoslavia) Palada	6	6	6
(Belgium) Moreau	0	1	4
(France) Journu	6	6	6	6	4
(Italy) Taroni	8	1	2	8	6
(Monaco) Landau
(France) Lesueur
(France) Langanay	2	6	6	7
(France) Combemale	6	1	3	5

Second round
5	(Czechoslovakia) Hecht	6	6	6
(Netherlands) Van Swol	4	2	0
(United Kingdom) Wilde	6	6	6
(Uruguay) Harreguy	2	4	0
12	(Kingdom of Yugoslavia) Palada	6	6	6
(Italy) Taroni	4	4	2
(France) Lesueur	6	6	6
(France) Langanay	3	2	2

Third round
5	(Czechoslovakia) Hecht	6	1	6	6
(United Kingdom) Wilde	4	6	2	1
12	(Kingdom of Yugoslavia) Palada	6	6	6
(France) Lesueur	3	2	2

Fourth round
5	(Czechoslovakia) Hecht	3	3	3
12	(Kingdom of Yugoslavia) Palada	6	6	6

==== Section 5 ====
First round
(France) Lips	6	2	3	6	3
(France) Vieillard	3	6	6	2	6
11	(Kingdom of Yugoslavia) Mitić	6	6	6
(United States) Thompson	0	2	0
(France) Papillon	4	2	1
(France) Bolelli	6	6	6
(France) Lecointre
(Netherlands) Hughan
(France) Depierre	3	2	6
(France) Rodel	6	6	8
(France) Abdesselam	8	6	7	4	6
(France) Dessair	10	3	5	6	1
(Switzerland) Mercier-Odier
(Monaco) Médécin
(Poland) Spychała	6	9	9
6	(France) Petra	4	7	7

Second round
(France) Vieillard	1	4	3
11	(Kingdom of Yugoslavia) Mitić	6	6	6
(France) Bolelli	6	3	6	6
(Netherlands) Hughan	1	6	4	4
(France) Rodel
(France) Abdesselam
(Switzerland) Mercier-Odier	2	1	1
(Poland) Spychała	6	6	6

Third round
11	(Kingdom of Yugoslavia) Mitić	6	6	2	6
(France) Bolelli	2	1	6	1
(France) Abdesselam	8	10	7
(Poland) Spychała	6	8	5

Fourth round
11	(Kingdom of Yugoslavia) Mitić	3	9	6	6
(France) Abdesselam	6	7	3	3

==== Section 6 ====
First round
(France) Pellizza	7	7	6
Schroter	5	5	4
(France) Dubuc	2	6	6	3	6
(France) Billaudot	6	3	4	6	3
(France) Sanglier	6	6	6
(France) Gajan	3	4	1
(United Kingdom) Mulliken	6	2	4	7	6
14	(United States) Robertson	1	6	6	5	3
(France) Favieres
(France) Zarifi

Second round
(France) Pellizza	4	4	2
(France) Dubuc	6	6	6
(France) Sanglier	6	6	3	2
(United Kingdom) Mulliken	8	4	6	6
(France) Favieres	2	4	6	6	4
(United Kingdom) Butler	6	6	4	4	6
(France) Roux	2	2	2
3	(Czechoslovakia) Menzel	6	6	6

Third round
(France) Dubuc	1	3	2
(United Kingdom) Mulliken	6	6	6
(United Kingdom) Butler	2	2	0
3	(Czechoslovakia) Menzel	6	6	6

Fourth round
(United Kingdom) Mulliken	6	8	2	1
3	(Czechoslovakia) Menzel	8	6	6	6

==== Section 7 ====
First round

Second round
(France) Feret	6	6	1	6
(France) Rimet	2	2	6	4
10	(Czechoslovakia) Cejnar	6	6	6
(France) Weiss	2	2	2
(Japan) Nakano	7	6	6
(France) Jaquemet	5	4	2
(France) Landry
7	(United States) Mako

Third round
(France) Feret	4	4	4
10	(Czechoslovakia) Cejnar	6	6	6
(Japan) Nakano	6	6	4	6
7	(United States) Mako	1	3	6	0

Fourth round
10	(Czechoslovakia) Cejnar	6	6	6
(Japan) Nakano	4	3	3

==== Section 8 ====
First round

Second round
(France) Goldschmidt	6	5	6	6
(France) Casanova	4	7	3	3
(Hungary) Gábori	6	6	7
15	(France) Martin-Legeay	4	2	5
(France) Van Sau	6	2	2	5
(United Kingdom) Deloford	4	6	6	7
(Italy) Bossi	6	3	3	0
2	(Kingdom of Yugoslavia) Punčec	4	6	6	6

Third round
(France) Goldschmidt	8	2	1	0
(Hungary) Gábori	6	6	6	6
(United Kingdom) Deloford	1	5	1
2	(Kingdom of Yugoslavia) Punčec	6	7	6

Fourth round
(Hungary) Gábori	4	1	1
2	(Kingdom of Yugoslavia) Punčec	6	6	6

Preceded by 1938 Australian Championships – Men's singles	Grand Slam men's singles	Succeeded by 1938 Wimbledon Championships – Men's singles
