= 1938 Wimbledon Championships – Mixed doubles =

Mixed doubles
- 1938 Wimbledon Championships

Final
- Champions: (United States) Don Budge (United States) Alice Marble
- Runners-up: (Germany) Henner Henkel (United States) Sarah Fabyan
- Score: 6–1, 6–4

Details
- Draw: 81 (4Q)
- Seeds: 8

Events
Singles	men	women		boys	girls
Doubles	men	women	mixed	boys	girls
- Wimbledon Championships

Don Budge and Alice Marble successfully defended their title, defeating Henner Henkel and Sarah Fabyan in the final, 6–1, 6–4 to win the mixed doubles tennis title at the 1938 Wimbledon Championships.

== Seeds ==
1. (United States) Don Budge / (United States) Alice Marble (champions)
2. (Germany) Henner Henkel / (United States) Sarah Fabyan (final)
3. (United States) Gene Mako / (Poland) Jadwiga Jędrzejowska (second round)
4. (Kingdom of Yugoslavia) Dragutin Mitić / (France) Simonne Mathieu (second round)
5. (France) Christian Boussus / (Australia) Nancye Wynne (quarterfinals)
6. (France) Jean Borotra / (United States) Helen Moody (quarterfinals)
7. (United Kingdom) John Olliff / (South Africa) Bobbie Heine Miller (quarterfinals)
8. (France) Jacques Brugnon / (Australia) Thelma Coyne (quarterfinals)

Click on the seed number of a player to go to their draw section.

== Draw ==
Key

- Q = Qualifier
- WC = Wild card
- LL = Lucky loser
- Alt = Alternate
- ITF = ITF entry
- PR = Protected ranking
- SR = Special ranking
- SE = Special exempt
- JE = Junior exempt
- JR = Junior Accelerator Programme entrant
- CO = College Accelerator Programme entrant
- NG = Next Gen Accelerator Program entrant
- w/o = Walkover
- r = Retired
- d = Defaulted

=== Finals ===
Quarterfinals
2	(Germany) Henner Henkel (United States) Sarah Fabyan	7	5	6
7	(United Kingdom) John Olliff (South Africa) Bobbie Heine Miller	5	7	2
(Argentina) Alejo Russell (United Kingdom) Freda James	6	7	6
5	(France) Christian Boussus (Australia) Nancye Wynne	2	9	4
8	(France) Jacques Brugnon (Australia) Thelma Coyne	6	1	5
(United Kingdom) Ronnie Shayes (United Kingdom) Jean Saunders	1	6	7
6	(France) Jean Borotra (United States) Helen Moody	1	4
1	(United States) Don Budge (United States) Alice Marble	6	6

Semifinals
2	(Germany) Henner Henkel (United States) Sarah Fabyan	6	1	6
(Argentina) Alejo Russell (United Kingdom) Freda James	3	6	3
(United Kingdom) Ronnie Shayes (United Kingdom) Jean Saunders	4	2
1	(United States) Don Budge (United States) Alice Marble	6	6

Final
2	(Germany) Henner Henkel (United States) Sarah Fabyan	1	4
1	(United States) Don Budge (United States) Alice Marble	6	6

=== Top half ===
==== Section 1 ====
First round

Second round
2	(Germany) Henner Henkel (United States) Sarah Fabyan	6	4	6
(Belgium) Pierre Geelhand de Merxem (Belgium) Josane de Meulemeester	3	6	1
(Czechoslovakia) Ladislav Hecht (Czechoslovakia) Greta Deutschová	6	6
(Switzerland) Charles Aeschlimann (South Africa) Olive Craze	4	3
(Germany) Georg von Metaxa (United States) Grace Wheeler	10	6
(United Kingdom) Murray Deloford (United Kingdom) Sheila Chuter	8	4
(United Kingdom) Colin Ritchie (United Kingdom) Penny Durlac	3	5
(Switzerland) Hector Fisher (Netherlands) Madzy Couquerque	6	7

Third round
2	(Germany) H Henkel (United States) S Fabyan	4	6	6
(Czechoslovakia) L Hecht (Czechoslovakia) G Deutschová	6	1	1
(Germany) G von Metaxa (United States) G Wheeler	6	8
(Switzerland) H Fisher (Netherlands) M Couquerque	2	6

Fourth round
2	(Germany) H Henkel (United States) S Fabyan	6	6
(Germany) G von Metaxa (United States) G Wheeler	4	3

==== Section 2 ====
First round

Second round
7	(United Kingdom) John Olliff (South Africa) Bobbie Heine Miller	6	6
(Monaco) Gaston Médécin (Kingdom of Yugoslavia) Hella Kovač	1	1
(United Kingdom) Jimmy Hunt (United Kingdom) Yvonne Law	6	7
(United Kingdom) Eric Filby (United Kingdom) Denise Huntbach	4	5
(Belgium) Léopold de Borman (United Kingdom) Susan Noel	7	1	3
(Germany) Rolf Göpfert (Germany) Rosl Kraus	5	6	6
(Japan) Fumiteru Nakano (United Kingdom) Ermyntrude Harvey	4	4
(United Kingdom) Frank Wilde (United Kingdom) Mary Whitmarsh	6	6

Third round
7	(United Kingdom) J Olliff (South Africa) E Heine Miller	6	6
(United Kingdom) J Hunt (United Kingdom) Y Law	1	1
(Germany) R Göpfert (Germany) R Kraus	5	6	2
(United Kingdom) F Wilde (United Kingdom) M Whitmarsh	7	4	6

Fourth round
7	(United Kingdom) J Olliff (South Africa) E Heine Miller	6	8
(United Kingdom) F Wilde (United Kingdom) M Whitmarsh	1	6

==== Section 3 ====
First round
(United Kingdom) Don Butler (United Kingdom) Mary Heeley	6	6
(Hungary) György Dallos (Australia) Dorothy Stevenson	2	3

Second round
4	(Kingdom of Yugoslavia) Dragutin Mitić (France) Simonne Mathieu	4	4
(Argentina) Alejo Russell (United Kingdom) Freda James	6	6
(Republic of China (1912–1949)) Kho Sin-Kie (United Kingdom) Kay Stammers	2	7	7
(United States) Owen Anderson (United Kingdom) Rita Jarvis	6	5	9
Q	(United Kingdom) TC Braithwaite (United Kingdom) Doris Davison	3	3
(New Zealand) Cam Malfroy (United Kingdom) Betty Nuthall	6	6
(New Zealand) Dewar Brown (New Zealand) Marjorie MacFarlane	2	3
(United Kingdom) D Butler (United Kingdom) M Heeley	6	6

Third round
(Argentina) A Russell (United Kingdom) W James	6	4	6
(United States) O Anderson (United Kingdom) R Jarvis	3	6	1
(New Zealand) C Malfroy (United Kingdom) B Nuthall	5	6	2
(United Kingdom) D Butler (United Kingdom) M Heeley	7	2	6

Fourth round
(Argentina) A Russell (United Kingdom) W James	7	4	6
(United Kingdom) D Butler (United Kingdom) M Heeley	5	6	1

==== Section 4 ====
First round
5	(France) Christian Boussus (Australia) Nancye Wynne	6	6
Q	(United Kingdom) Maurice Lucking (United Kingdom) Gladys Osborne	1	2
(United Kingdom) Eric Peters (United Kingdom) Effie Peters	5	5
(Germany) Daniel Prenn (United Kingdom) Evelyn Dearman	7	7
(Italy) Alberto del Bono (Italy) Lucia Valerio	4	2
(Hungary) Ottó Szigeti (Hungary) Margit Paksy	6	6
(Netherlands) Hans van Swol (United Kingdom) Sheila Paterson	6	6
(South Africa) Walter Musgrove (United States) Dorothy Bundy	4	4
(Japan) Tamio Abe (Australia) Margaret Wilson	4	4
(Kingdom of Yugoslavia) Josip Palada (United Kingdom) Gaby Curtis	6	6
(United Kingdom) Herman David (Australia) Joan Hartigan	6	6	4
(United Kingdom) Pat Hughes (United Kingdom) Patsy O'Connell	3	8	6
(United Kingdom) Ted Avory (United Kingdom) Joan Strawson	2	8
(Belgium) Jack Van den Eynde (United Kingdom) Pamela Morison	6	10
(Australia) Mervyn Weston (South Africa) Sheila Piercey	3	4
(United Kingdom) Pat Sherwood (United Kingdom) Elsa Haylock	6	6

Second round
5	(France) C Boussus (Australia) N Wynne	6	6
(Germany) D Prenn (United Kingdom) E Dearman	1	2
(Hungary) O Szigeti (Hungary) M Paksy	3	9
(Netherlands) H van Swol (United Kingdom) S Paterson	6	11
(Kingdom of Yugoslavia) J Palada (United Kingdom) G Curtis	2	3
(United Kingdom) P Hughes (United Kingdom) P O'Connell	6	6
(Belgium) J Van den Eynde (United Kingdom) P Morison	7	3
(United Kingdom) P Sherwood (United Kingdom) E Haylock	9	6

Third round
5	(France) C Boussus (Australia) N Wynne	6	6
(Netherlands) H van Swol (United Kingdom) S Paterson	4	2
(United Kingdom) P Hughes (United Kingdom) P O'Connell	5	7	4
(United Kingdom) P Sherwood (United Kingdom) E Haylock	7	5	6

Fourth round
5	(France) C Boussus (Australia) N Wynne	6	6
(United Kingdom) P Sherwood (United Kingdom) E Haylock	1	3

=== Bottom half ===
==== Section 5 ====
First round
Q	(United Kingdom) Harold Hare (United Kingdom) Nina Brown	8	6
(New Zealand) Dennis Coombe (United Kingdom) Margaret Mellows	6	1
(United Kingdom) Henry Billington (United Kingdom) Joan Ingram	6	6
(Belgium) Jean Moreau (Canada) Jean Milne	3	1
(United Kingdom) Ralph Nichols (United Kingdom) Betty Uber	2	4
(United Kingdom) Jack Piercy (United Kingdom) Betty Batt	6	6
(United Kingdom) Jimmy Jones (South Africa) Margaret Morphew	6	6
(Republic of Ireland) Raymond Egan (Republic of Ireland) Joy Myerscough	3	3
(United Kingdom) Bobby Meredith (United Kingdom) Ruth Kirk	6	7
(Germany) Engelbert Koch (Germany) Gisela Enger	4	5
(United Kingdom) Bunny Austin (United Kingdom) Mary Hardwick	6	6
(Hungary) Mihály Csikós (Hungary) Magda Baumgarten	3	1
(United Kingdom) Philip Glover (United Kingdom) Nancy Glover	6	3	6
(Switzerland) Werner Steiner (Denmark) Else Hollis	3	6	4
(Romania) Alexandru Hamburger (United Kingdom) Andree Lucas	2	1
8	(France) Jacques Brugnon (Australia) Thelma Coyne	6	6

Second round
Q	(United Kingdom) H Hare (United Kingdom) N Brown	6	5	3
(United Kingdom) H Billington (United Kingdom) J Ingram	4	7	6
(United Kingdom) J Piercy (United Kingdom) E Batt	6	6	9
(United Kingdom) C Jones (South Africa) M Morphew	8	2	7
(United Kingdom) G Meredith (United Kingdom) R Kirk	4	6	4
(United Kingdom) H Austin (United Kingdom) M Hardwick	6	4	6
(United Kingdom) P Glover (United Kingdom) N Glover	0	7
8	(France) J Brugnon (Australia) T Coyne	6	9

Third round
(United Kingdom) H Billington (United Kingdom) J Ingram	6	6
(United Kingdom) J Piercy (United Kingdom) E Batt	3	2
(United Kingdom) H Austin (United Kingdom) M Hardwick	0	3
8	(France) J Brugnon (Australia) T Coyne	6	6

Fourth round
(United Kingdom) H Billington (United Kingdom) J Ingram	4	7	10
8	(France) J Brugnon (Australia) T Coyne	6	5	12

==== Section 6 ====
First round

Second round
(Brazil) Alcides Procópio (Chile) Anita Lizana	1	1
(United Kingdom) Bob Tinkler (United Kingdom) Margot Lumb	6	6
(United Kingdom) Harry Lee (United Kingdom) Nancy Macpherson-Grant	6	12
(United Kingdom) Peter Anderson; Mrs WT Cooke	2	10
(Argentina) Hector Etchart (United Kingdom) Patience Thomson	2	3
(France) Henri Bolelli (France) Sylvie Henrotin	6	6
(United Kingdom) Ronnie Shayes (United Kingdom) Jean Saunders	6	6
3	(United States) Gene Mako (Poland) Jadwiga Jędrzejowska	3	2

Third round
(United Kingdom) R Tinkler (United Kingdom) M Lumb	5	2
(United Kingdom) H Lee (United Kingdom) N Macpherson-Grant	7	6
(France) H Bolelli (France) S Henrotin	3	2
(United Kingdom) R Shayes (United Kingdom) J Saunders	6	6

Fourth round
(United Kingdom) H Lee (United Kingdom) N Macpherson-Grant	8	2	4
(United Kingdom) R Shayes (United Kingdom) J Saunders	6	6	6

The nationality of Mrs WT Cooke is unknown.

==== Section 7 ====
First round

Second round
(United Kingdom) Jack Lysaght (United Kingdom) Billie Yorke	6	6
(United Kingdom) Dickie Ritchie (United Kingdom) Valerie Scott	3	4
(United Kingdom) Jack Harrison (United Kingdom) Mary Burrows	3	7	6
(United Kingdom) Lewis Michell (United Kingdom) Peggy Michell	6	5	4
(United Kingdom) Ian Collins (United Kingdom) Lady Rowallan	2	5
(Netherlands) Tod Hughan (United Kingdom) Gem Hoahing	6	7
(Czechoslovakia) Roderich Menzel (United Kingdom) Doris Howard	3	4
6	(France) Jean Borotra (United States) Helen Moody	6	6

Third round
(United Kingdom) J Lysaght (United Kingdom) B Yorke	1	6	6
(United Kingdom) J Harrison (United Kingdom) M Burrows	6	4	3
(Netherlands) T Hughan (United Kingdom) C Hoahing	4	1
6	(France) J Borotra (United States) H Moody	6	6

Fourth round
(United Kingdom) J Lysaght (United Kingdom) B Yorke	2	6	0
6	(France) J Borotra (United States) H Moody	6	2	6

==== Section 8 ====
First round

Second round
(Kingdom of Yugoslavia) Franjo Kukuljević (United States) Dorothy Andrus	6	6
(United Kingdom) Tommy Anderson (United Kingdom) Rosemary Smith	3	3
(India) Leonard Brooke Edwards (United Kingdom) Betty Smith	6	3	8
(United Kingdom) Edmund David (United Kingdom) Betty Hobson	4	6	6
Q	(United Kingdom) Guy Pettigrew (United Kingdom) Sonia Mavrogordato	4	4
(Kingdom of Yugoslavia) Franjo Punčec (Australia) Nell Hopman	6	6
(United Kingdom) Donald MacPhail (United Kingdom) Phyllis King	0	0
1	(United States) Don Budge (United States) Alice Marble	6	6

Third round
(Kingdom of Yugoslavia) F Kukuljević (United States) D Andrus	6	6
(India) L Brooke Edwards (United Kingdom) B Smith	1	1
(Kingdom of Yugoslavia) F Punčec (Australia) E Hopman	5	1
1	(United States) D Budge (United States) A Marble	7	6

Fourth round
(Kingdom of Yugoslavia) F Kukuljević (United States) D Andrus	5	3
1	(United States) D Budge (United States) A Marble	7	6
