= Gies =

Gies is a surname of Germanic origin. It is either a patronymic surname, Gies being a form of the old Germanic name Giso, or a toponymic surname related to the Old High German word Gieze for a small stream. People with this name include:

- Frances Gies (1915–2013), American historian, author, and wife of Joseph
- Gerd Gies (born 1943), German politician
- Hans-Peter Gies (born 1947), East German shot putter
- Heinrich Gies (1912–1973), German actor
- Jan Gies (1905–1993), Dutch resistance figure who helped hide Anne Frank
- Jeroen Gies (born 1995), German-Dutch football player
- Joseph Gies (1916–2006), American historian, author, and husband of Frances
- Kurt Gies (1921–1943), German tennis player
- Ludwig Gies (1887–1966), German sculptor and medallist
- Miep Gies (1909–2010), Dutch resistance figure who helped hide Anne Frank
- Reiner Gies (born 1963), German boxer
- William John Gies (1872–1956), American biochemist and dentist

As a given name

- Gies Cosyns (1920–1997), Belgian painter and politician

== Other ==
- Gies College of Business at the University of Illinois Urbana-Champaign, in Champaign, Illinois
- Gies Memorial Stadium at the University of Illinois Urbana-Champaign, in Champaign, Illinois
- Gies Kerzen GmbH, German candle manufacturer
