= Agnes li Patiniere =

Agnes li Patiniere was a 13th-century Flemish cloth-dyer in Douai. In 1286, along with 44 other employees, she sued her employer, a wool merchant called Jehanne Boinebroke, complaining of unpaid wages, underparyment, unfair property seizures and evictions without proper cause.

Agnes li Patiniere was the subject of a chapter in Women in the Middle Ages (1978), by Frances and Joseph Gies.
