= 1930 Hungarian International Tennis Championships – Men's singles =

Men's singles
- 1930 Hungarian International Tennis Championships
- 1929 Champion: (Hungary) Béla Von Kehrling

Final
- Champion: (Czechoslovakia) Roderich Menzel
- Runner-up: (Hungary) Béla Von Kehrling
- Score: 4–6, 6–3, 6–4, 6–1

Events
Singles	men	women
Doubles	men	women
← 1929 ·	Hungarian International Tennis Championships	· 1931 →

Béla Von Kehrling was the reigning champion but was defeated by Roderich Menzel 4–6, 6–3, 6–4, 6–1 who won his first Hungarian International Tennis Championships.

== Seeds ==
The third and fourth seeds had to play a play-off pre-match into the first round.

1. (Hungary) Béla Von Kehrling (final)
2. (Czechoslovakia) Roderich Menzel (champion)
3. (Austria) Franz Wilhelm Matejka (semifinal)
4. (Empire of Japan) Hyotaro Sato (semifinal)
5. (Weimar Republic) Fritz Kuhlmann(third round)
6. (Austria) Hermann Artens (first round)
7. (France) Georges Glasser (first round)
8. (Czechoslovakia) Friedrich Rohrer (first round)

== Draw ==
=== Key ===
- Q = Qualifier
- WC = Wild card
- LL = Lucky loser
- Alt = Alternate
- ITF = ITF entry
- PR = Protected ranking
- SR = Special ranking
- SE = Special exempt
- JE = Junior exempt
- JR = Junior Accelerator Programme entrant
- CO = College Accelerator Programme entrant
- NG = Next Gen Accelerator Program entrant
- w/o = Walkover
- r = Retired
- d = Defaulted

=== Finals ===
Semifinals
1	(Hungary) Béla Von Kehrling	6	6	6
4	(Empire of Japan) Hyotaro Sato	4	4	0
3	(Austria) Franz Wilhelm Matejka	6	2	2
2	(Czechoslovakia) Roderich Menzel	8	6	6

Finals
1	(Hungary) Béla Von Kehrling	6	3	4	1
2	(Czechoslovakia) Roderich Menzel	4	6	6	6

=== Top half ===
==== Section 1 ====
First round
1	(Hungary) Béla Von Kehrling	6	6
(Hungary) Ferenc Mattiasich	3	1
(Kingdom of Yugoslavia) Franjo Kukuljević
(Hungary) Jenő Kalledey	w/o
(Hungary) György Bánó	6	4	5
(Hungary) Kálmán Kirchmäyr	4	6	7
(Hungary) Ernő Csermák	0	4
(Czechoslovakia) Vladimír Zaorálek	6	6
(Kingdom of Yugoslavia) Franjo Šefer
(Czechoslovakia) Richard Nedbálek	w/o
(Hungary) Miklós Vay	w/o
(Hungary) Pál Leiner
(Austria) Heinrich Eifermann	6	6
(Hungary) Lachner	0	1
(Hungary) Jenő Pétery	6	6
7	(France) Georges Glasser	4	2

Second round
1	(Hungary) Kehrling	6	6
(Hungary) Kalledey	3	0
(Hungary) Kirchmäyr	3	6	4
(Czechoslovakia) Zaorálek	6	4	6
(Czechoslovakia) Nedbálek	6	6
(Hungary) Vay	4	3
(Austria) Eifermann	5	6	6
(Hungary) Pétery	7	4	2

Third round
1	(Hungary) Kehrling	6	7
(Czechoslovakia) Zaorálek	4	5
(Czechoslovakia) Nedbálek	8	6	2
(Austria) Eifermann	6	8	6	w/o

Quarterfinal
1	(Hungary) Kehrling	6	6
(Czechoslovakia) Nedbálek	1	2

==== Section 2 ====
First round
5	(Weimar Republic) Fritz Kuhlmann	8	6
(Hungary) István Heinrich	6	2
(Hungary) Egon Adler
(Hungary) Iván Dresdner	w/o
(Hungary) László Vásárhelyi	2	2
(Czechoslovakia) László Klein	6	6
(Hungary) Nagy	0	2
(Hungary) Imre Takáts	6	6
(United States) Harry Cayley	w/o
(Hungary) Lehel Bánó
(Hungary) László Silbersdorf	6	6
Q	(Hungary) Elek Straub	2	4
Q	(Italy) Riboli
Q	(Czechoslovakia) František Sojka	w/o
Q	(Italy) Dr. Amici
4/Q	(Empire of Japan) Hyotaro Sato	w/o

Second round
5	(Weimar Republic) Kuhlmann	6	6
(Hungary) Dresdner	3	2
(Czechoslovakia) Klein	2	1
(Hungary) Takáts	6	6
(United States) Cayley	3	0
(Hungary) Silbersdorf	6	6
Q	(Czechoslovakia) Sojka
4	(Empire of Japan) Sato	w/o

Third round
5	(Weimar Republic) Kuhlmann	3	4
(Hungary) Takáts	6	6
(Hungary) Silbersdorf	3	6	1	4
4	(Empire of Japan) Sato	6	3	6

Quarterfinal
(Hungary) Takáts	0	5
4	(Empire of Japan) Sato	6	7

=== Bottom half ===
==== Section 3 ====
First round
3/Q	(Austria) Franz Wilhelm Matejka	6	6
Q	(Hungary) Imre Zichy	3	1
Q	(Hungary) László Palásthy	w/o
Q	(Hungary) György Faragó
Q	(Czechoslovakia) Karl Sada	6	6
(Hungary) Andor Várady-Szabó	1	3
(Hungary) Károly Kohl	2	3
(Czechoslovakia) Josef Malacek	6	6
(Weimar Republic) H. Uthmoller	6	2	2
(Czechoslovakia) Ladislav Hecht	3	6	6
(Hungary) Fedor Nikolits
(Austria) Herbert Kinzl	w/o
(Hungary) István László	3	6	6
(Austria) Ludwig Albrecht	6	2	2
(Hungary) Helmut Radicke	w/o
8	(Czechoslovakia) Friedrich Rohrer

Second round
3	(Austria) Matejka	6	1	6
Q	(Hungary) Palásthy	2	6	3
Q	(Czechoslovakia) Sada	6	4	r
(Czechoslovakia) Malacek	4	6
(Czechoslovakia) Hecht	6	6
(Austria) Kinzl	2	4
(Hungary) László	6	3	2
(Hungary) Radicke	4	6	6

Third round
3	(Austria) Matejka	6	7
(Czechoslovakia) Malacek	4	5
(Czechoslovakia) Hecht	6	6
(Hungary) Radicke	4	2

Quarterfinal
3	(Austria) Matejka	6	6
(Czechoslovakia) Hecht	1	1

==== Section 4 ====
First round
6	(Austria) Hermann Artens
(Hungary) Roland Jacobi	w/o
(Hungary) Gyula Kirchner	w/o
(Hungary) Jenő Horváth
(Hungary) Emil Gabrowitz	6	6
(Hungary) Tamás Márffy Mantuánó	2	2
(Hungary) József Dzurik	2	2
(France) Roger Danet	6	6
(Hungary) Tibor Krepuska	6	6
(Hungary) Miklós Tömöry	1	1
(Socialist Federal Republic of Yugoslavia) Ivan Balás	w/o
(Hungary) Béla Hardy-Dreher
(Hungary) Nándor Friedrich	w/o
(Hungary) Pál Kiss
(Italy) Krassik
2	(Czechoslovakia) Roderich Menzel	w/o

Second round
(Hungary) Jacobi	7	6
(Hungary) Kirchner	5	3
(Hungary) Gabrowitz	6	6
(France) Danet	3	2
(Hungary) Krepuska	w/o
(Socialist Federal Republic of Yugoslavia) Balás
(Hungary) Friedrich	5	6
2	(Czechoslovakia) Menzel	7	8

Third round
(Hungary) Jacobi	2	4
(Hungary) Gabrowitz	6	6
(Hungary) Krepuska	2	3
2	(Czechoslovakia) Menzel	6	6

Quarterfinal
(Hungary) Gabrowitz	3	2
2	(Czechoslovakia) Menzel	6	6
