= František Cejnar =

Czechoslovak tennis player (1917–1965)

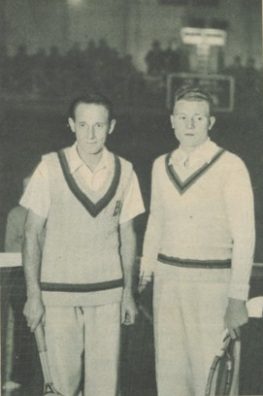
- Country (sports): Czechoslovakia
- Born: 1 October 1917; Prague, Austria-Hungary
- Died: 3 May 1965

Singles
- Career titles: 10

Grand Slam singles results
- French Open: QF (1937, 1938)
- Wimbledon: QF (1938)

Doubles

Grand Slam doubles results
- Wimbledon: QF (1938)

František Cejnar (1 October 1917 – 3 May 1965) was a Czechoslovak amateur tennis player in the 1930s.

== Tennis career ==
One of the highlights of Cejnar's career was when he beat Gottfried von Cramm in four sets in the final of the Berlin championships in 1937. Cejnar reached the quarterfinals of the French Open in 1937 and 1938 and Wimbledon in 1938. Competing in a Davis Cup match for Czechoslovakia against Yugoslavia in 1938, Cejnar left the court in the early stages of the fifth set of the fifth and deciding rubber against Dragutin Mitić, because in that era there was a general agreement to cease play at 7pm. However, Yugoslavia claimed victory, which was upheld by the referee.
