= Ronald Shayes =

English tennis player (1912–40)

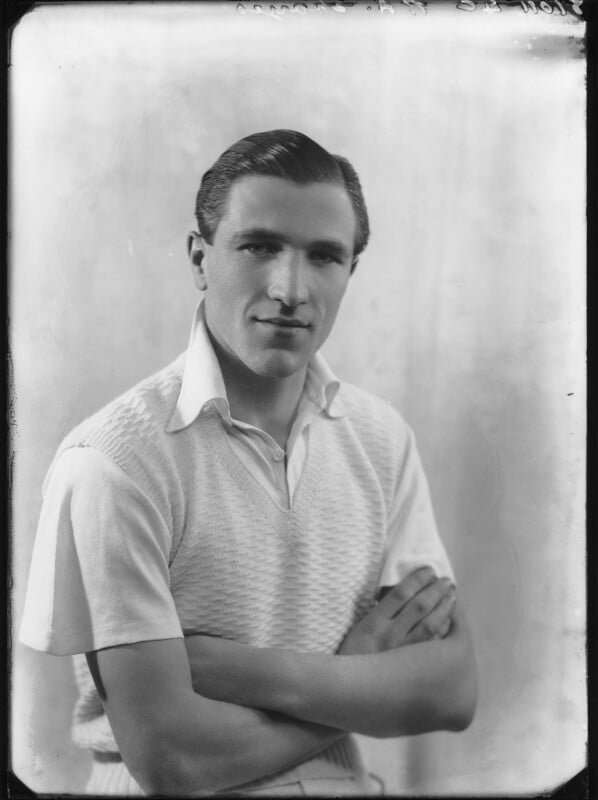
- Shayes in 1936
- Full name: Ronald Alfred Shayes
- Country (sports): Great Britain
- Born: 12 September 1912
- Died: 17 December 1940 (aged 28); Southern Rhodesia
- Height: 6 ft 4 in (193 cm)

Singles

Grand Slam singles results
- French Open: 2R (1937, 1938, 1939)
- Wimbledon: 4R (1937, 1938, 1939)
- US Open: 3R (1938)

Doubles

Grand Slam doubles results
- Wimbledon: SF (1939)

Grand Slam mixed doubles results
- Wimbledon: SF (1938)

Ronald Alfred Shayes (12 September 1912 – 17 December 1940) was a British tennis player.

A native of London, Shayes got his first introduction to tennis at the Garden Lawn Tennis Club in West Wickham and was active on tour during the 1930s. He was an architect by profession.

Shayes reached the singles fourth round at Wimbledon three times and was a doubles semi-finalist twice. In his only appearance at the U.S. National Championships in 1938 he took Bobby Riggs to five sets in a third round loss.

From 1938 to 1939, Shayes played for Great Britain in the Davis Cup. His 1939 reverse singles win over Bernard Destremau, which was considered an upset, secured a tie against France.

Shayes ended 1939 as Great Britain's third ranked player.

In 1940, Shayes was killed in a flying accident in Southern Rhodesia, while training with the Royal Air Force.

== See also ==
- List of Great Britain Davis Cup team representatives
