= 1930 Hungarian International Tennis Championships =

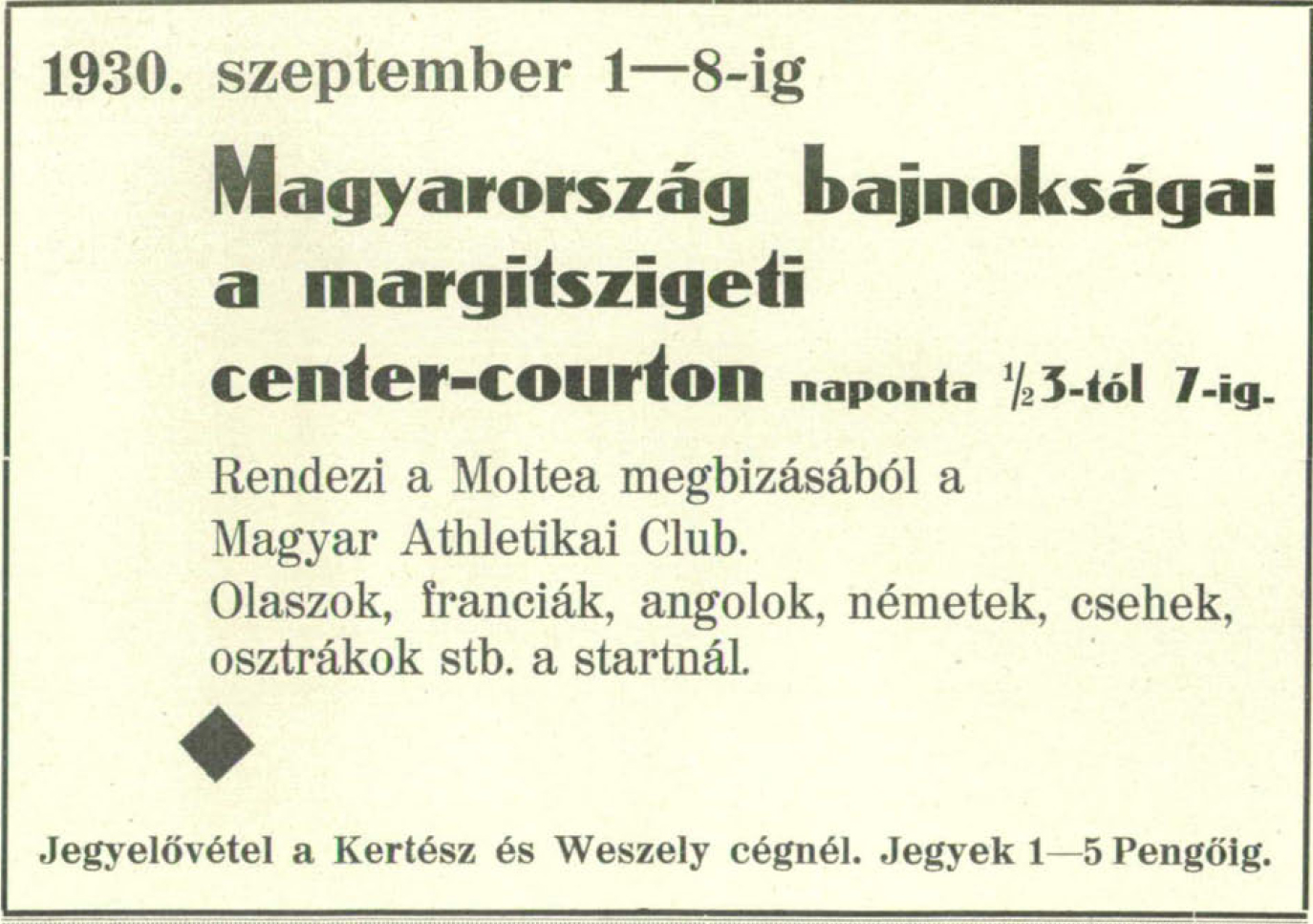
- Date: September 2–8
- Edition: 14th

Champions

Men's singles
- (Czechoslovakia) Roderich Menzel

Women's singles
- (Weimar Republic) Hilde Krahwinkel Sperling

Men's doubles
- (Czechoslovakia) Friedrich Rohrer / (Czechoslovakia) Roderich Menzel

Women's doubles
- (Weimar Republic) Hilde Krahwinkel Sperling / (Weimar Republic) Anne Peitz

Mixed doubles
- (France) Georges Glasser / (France) Simone Barbier
← 1929 ·	Hungarian International Tennis Championships	· 1931 →

The 1930 Hungarian International Tennis Championships was a tennis tournament played on outdoor clay courts which took place at the Margitsziget courts. It was part of the Hungarian International Tennis Championships series. The event was preceded by two years of promotion, which led to a greater number of foreign participants. As a result of the raised prize money the Hungarian Athletics Club decided to only organize the tournaments while the Hungarian Lawn Tennis Association took over the sponsoring task. The draw was announced on 1 September. The directors were disappointed by the many walkovers, which occurred in the early stages of the competition and the low performance of Hungarian players in overall.

== Champions ==
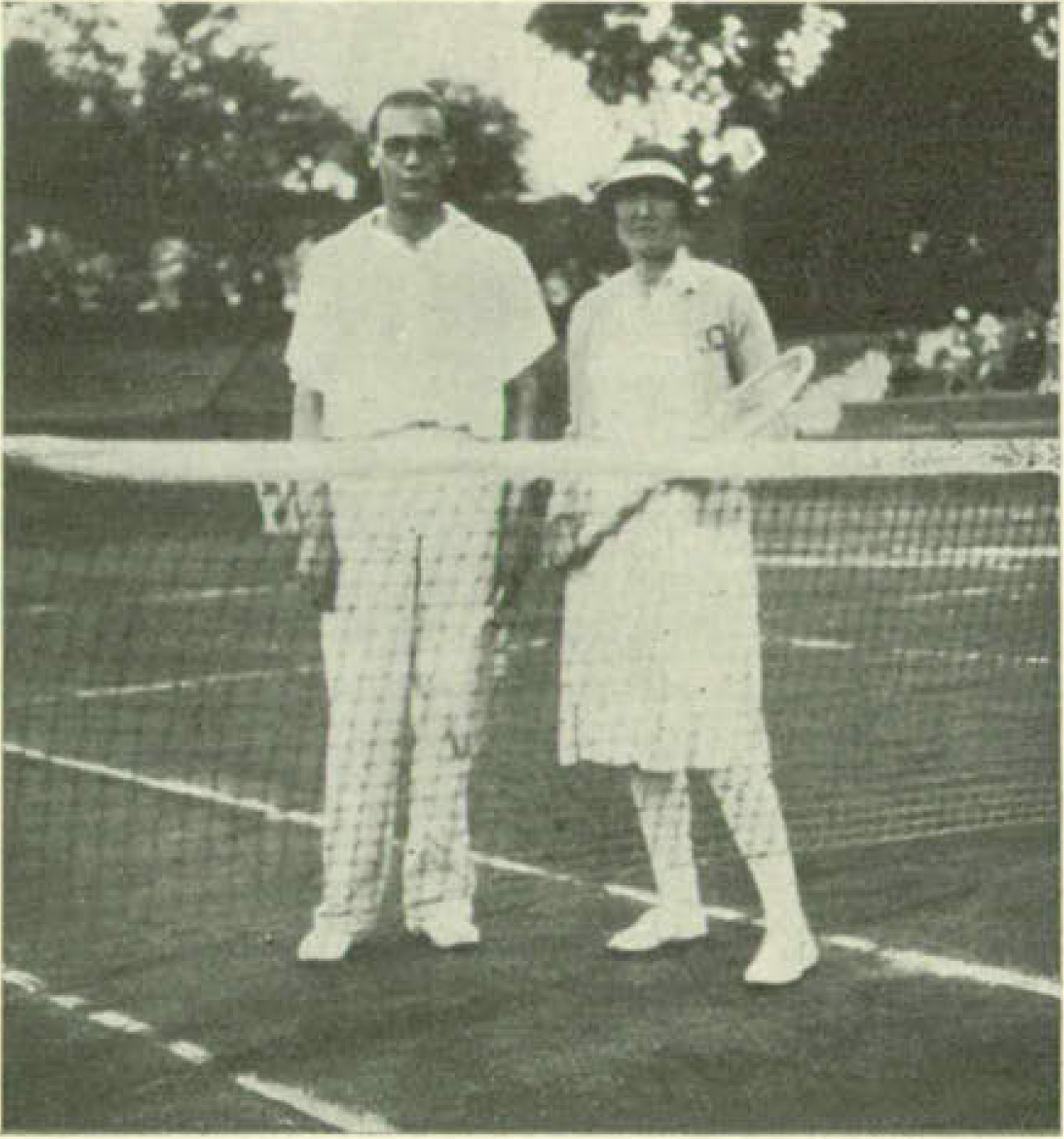
Mixed doubles champions Georges Glasser and Simone Barbier at Margitsziget

=== Men's singles ===
(Czechoslovakia) Roderich Menzel defeated (Hungary) Béla von Kehrling; 4–6, 6–3, 6–4, 6–1

=== Women's singles ===
(Weimar Republic) Hilde Krahwinkel Sperling defeated (Weimar Republic) Anne Peitz; 6–4, 2–6, 8–6

=== Men's doubles ===
(Czechoslovakia) Friedrich Rohrer / (Czechoslovakia) Roderich Menzel defeated (Hungary) Imre Takáts / (Austria) Franz Wilhelm Matejka; 7–5, 8–6, 9–7

=== Women's doubles ===
(Weimar Republic) Hilde Krahwinkel Sperling / (Weimar Republic) Anne Peitz defeated (France) Simone Barbier (France) Violette Gallay; 6–3, 7–5

=== Mixed doubles ===
(France) Georges Glasser / (France) Simone Barbier defeated (Weimar Republic) Fritz Kuhlmann / (Weimar Republic) Hilde Krahwinkel Sperling; 5–7, 8–6, 6–4

== See also ==
- Hungarian National Tennis Championships
