= Margaret Morphew =

South African tennis player (1916–1987)

- Full name: Margaret Ethel Morphew
- Country (sports): South Africa
- Born: 3 August 1916 Clansthal, South Africa
- Died: 6 September 1987 (aged 71) Howick, South Africa

Singles

Grand Slam singles results
- Wimbledon: 4R (1938)

Doubles

Grand Slam doubles results
- Wimbledon: SF (1938)

Grand Slam mixed doubles results
- Wimbledon: 2R (1938)

Margaret Morphew (3 August 1916 – 6 September 1987) was a South African tennis player who was active in the 1930s.

Morphew grew up in Dargle, Natal and started playing tennis at an early age, coached by her mother.

In July 1938 she toured England as part of a South African women's team which also included Bobbie Heine Miller, Sheila Piercey and Olive Craze. Morphew participated in all three events of the 1938 Wimbledon Championships. In the singles event she reached the fourth round, after victories over Smith, Harvey and Noel, and was defeated by third-seeded Jadwiga Jędrzejowska in two sets. In the doubles event she teamed up with compatriot Heine Miller to reach the semifinal where eventual champions Sarah Fabyan and Alice Marble were victorious in two sets. In the mixed doubles she and her partner Jimmy Jones were defeated in the second round.

Morphew won the South African Championships doubles title in 1937, 1938 and 1939, partnering Heine Miller and was runner-up in 1947 and 1949. Also with Heine Miller she won the Southern Transvaal doubles title in 1936 and 1937. Her tennis career was curtailed by the outbreak of the Second World War.
