= Kurt Gies =

German tennis player

- Full name: Kurt Helmut Gies
- Country (sports): (Nazi Germany) Germany
- Born: 18 May 1921; Mülheim an der Ruhr, Weimar Republic
- Died: 23 November 1943 (aged 22); Eastern Front

Kurt Helmut Gies (18 May 1921 – 23 November 1943) was a German tennis player.

== Biography ==
Kurt Gies was born the son of Heinrich Gies, an administrator of the local sports facilities Am Kahlenberg. While his three elder brothers Johann, Wilhelm and Heinrich worked as tennis coaches, Kurt's father hoped his fourth son would pursuit a different career. However, Kurt joined the local tennis club at an age of 13 and was quickly recognized an outstanding tennis talent. In 1938 and 1939, he won the German boys championships. From 1939, he was coached by Hans Nüsslein.

In 1940, Gies won the German championships in mixed doubles along with Ulla Rosenow. In the same year, Gies was sent on a trip to Japan together with former French champion Henner Henkel, where they played a couple of exhibition matches as well as four Japanese-German competitions.

In 1941, Gies won the German championships at Braunschweig by beating favorite Adam Baworowski in the final in five sets. He was also successful in doubles, along with Henner Henkel. He also captured the title at the Danish indoor championships where he beat Anker Jacobsen in the final.

Gies was later drafted into the German army which prevented him from defending his German title in 1942. In 1943, he was granted vacation and took part in a tennis competition between Germany and Hungary at Berlin which the Hungarian team won. He was able to win his second German title at Braunschweig by beating Engelbert Koch in the final. Again, he also won the doubles championship, this time with Koch.

Only a few weeks after his victory at Braunschweig, the young lieutenant was killed in action on the Eastern Front on 23 November 1943.
