= Kho Sin-Kie =

Chinese tennis player (1912–1947)

Kho Sin-Khie
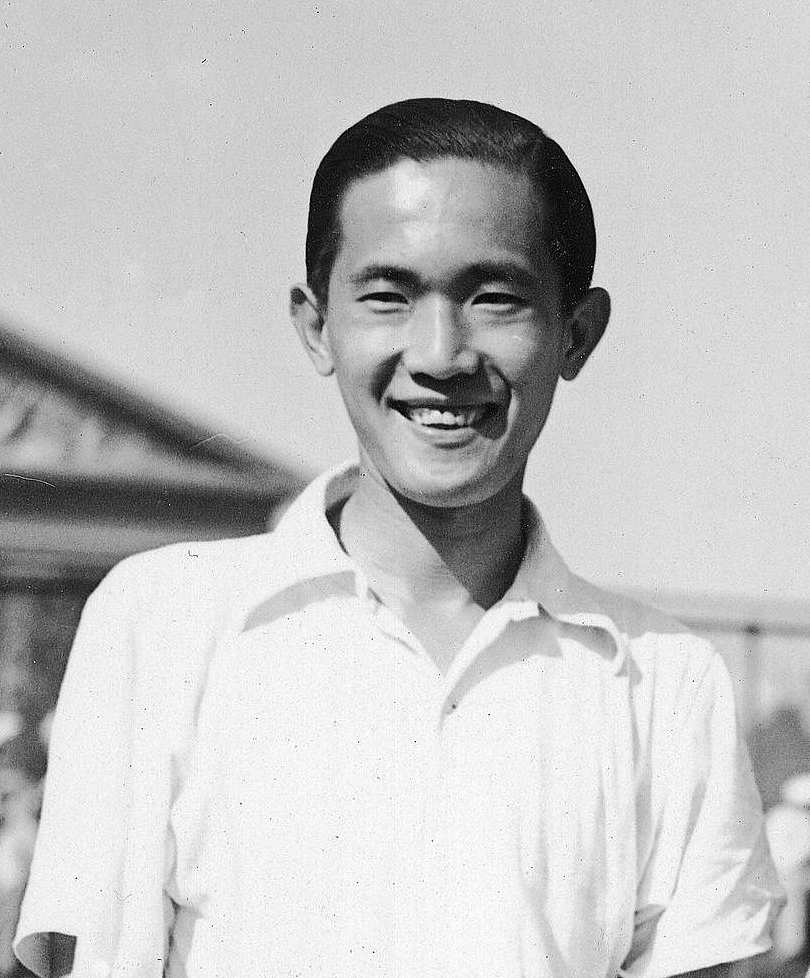
- Kho Sin-Kie in 1939
- Country (sports): (Republic of China (1912–1949)) Republic of China
- Born: 2 September 1912 Banyumas Regency, Dutch East Indies
- Died: 31 January 1947 (aged 34) London, United Kingdom
- Height: 5 ft 11 in (1.80 m)
- Turned pro: 1929 (amateur tour)

Singles
- Career titles: 40

Grand Slam singles results
- French Open: 4R (1936)
- Wimbledon: 4R (1938)

Grand Slam mixed doubles results
- French Open: 3R (1936)

Kho Sin-Khie (Chinese: 許承基; pinyin: Xǔ Chéngjī; September 2, 1912 – January 31, 1947) was an Indonesian-born tennis player who represented the Republic of China in the Davis Cup. He was from the Peranakan Chinese ethnic group. He was the first Chinese player ever to win a major international tournament. He was a two time winner of the British Hard Court Championships, and the Surrey Grass Court Championships on one occasion. He also won the Swiss International Championships (1938), Italian and Swedish champion as well.

== Early years ==
Kho was born and raised in Java to a poor family in an eggplant farm where his father, Han Tiong was the head of the village. He had three brothers and three sisters. After he had been dropped out of school he started playing tennis at the age of 14, while working in a sports equipment store. In the early years he had troubles to make his father understand his admiration for the game. In 1929, he won the Central Java Tennis Championship. In 1932, his parents died. He won the All-Java Championship in 1933. In 1933, he won the Chinese national championships topping Qiufei Hai of Shanghai. In 1935, he became the Chinese national champion for the second time after beating compatriot Khoo Hooi Hye and subsequently was named the top Chinese player. Local people raised money for him to support his post-graduate education in Switzerland. In 1936, he arrived to Great Britain to attend college, and he was offered a job at the Chinese Embassy. He studied commerce in London. Later he was sponsored by the Dunlop Rubber Company.

== Tennis career ==
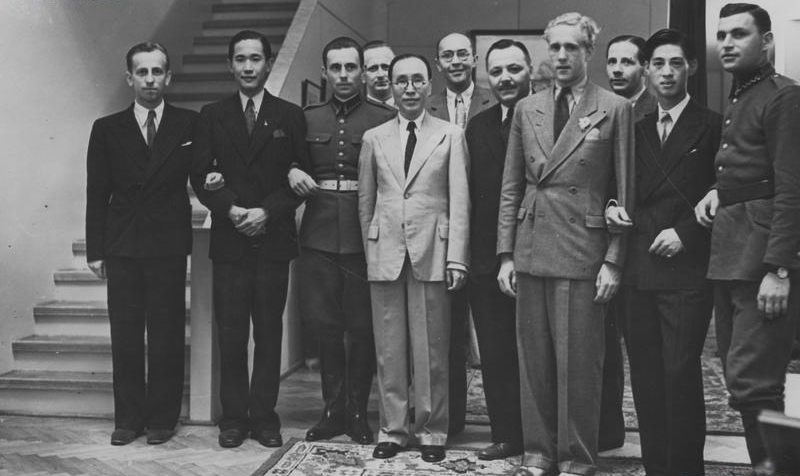
Kho Sin-Kie (second from left) in Poland in 1939

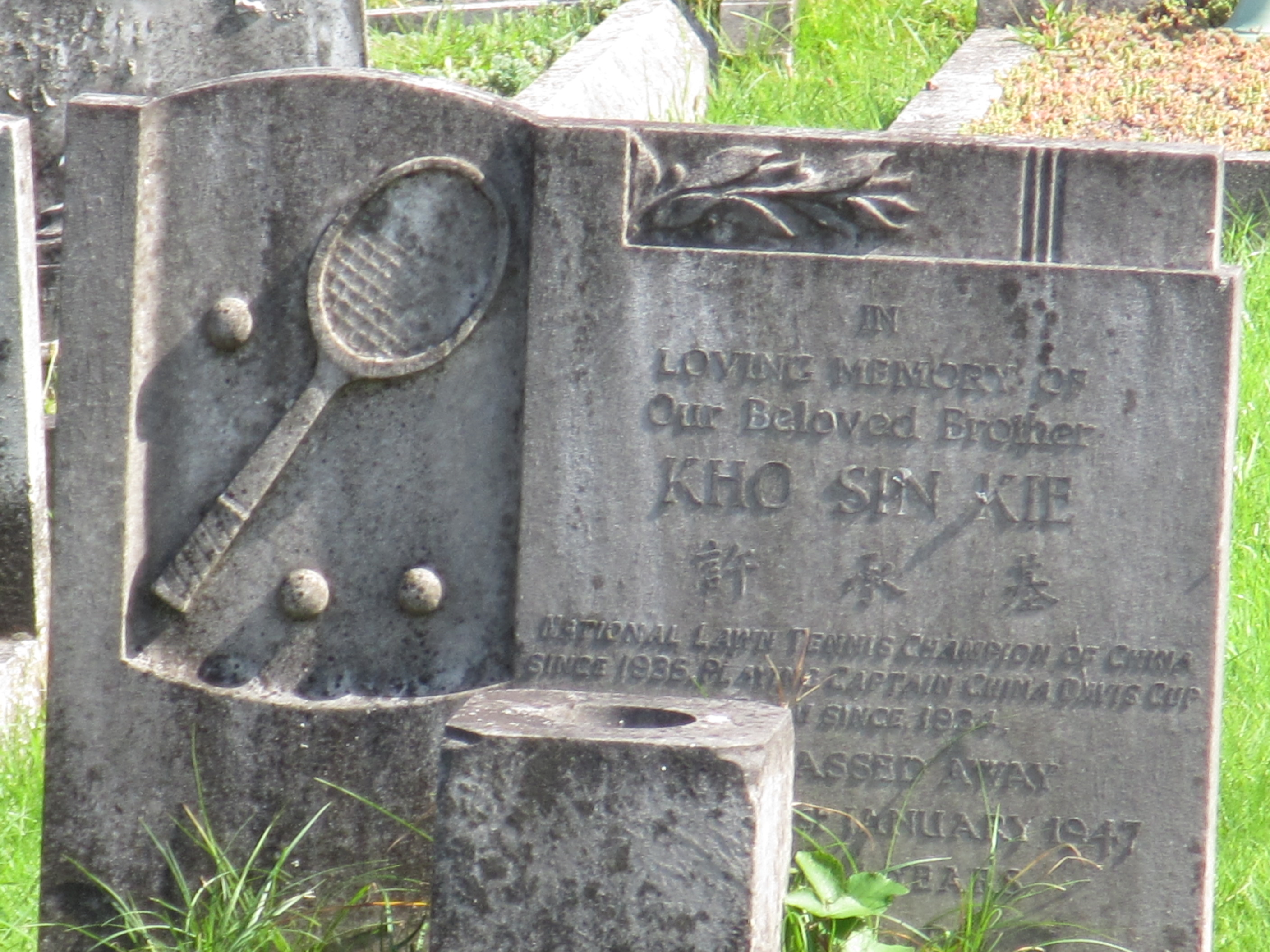
Headstone of Kho's grave

He played his first international matches in 1934 when he toured Sumatra challenging the Netherlands Davis Cup team. In Kisaran, he met Cornelius Bryan (Champion of Sumatra) whom he beat in three sets. In doubles, Bryan and team member Hendrik Timmer scored a three-set victory against the Chinese. Then they moved to Siantar where at the inaugural of the Simeloengoen Club two one-set matches were held. Bryan and Kho went toe-to-toe in singles with Kho victorious. Then he faced Alsbach and won six to four. This was followed by the doubles between Timmer-Bryan and Alsbach-Kho, which was abandoned due to Bryan's injury with Khos' leading one set and one break in the second, while the Bryan was serving to stay in the match. In Medan, he beat Bryan and had his match with Alsbach interrupted as it started raining.

In 1935, the Dutch Indies Tennis Association invited a couple of European players to play a series of exhibition matches in the Orient. In Surabaya, he paired with Nami to face Giorgio de Stefani and Enrique Maier and lost in two sets. Then the party traveled to Surakarta where singles matches were held and Kho faced de Stefani with the Italian coming out victoriously. Then on a rematch in Semarang, Kho prevailed for the first time over de Stefani in front a home crowd of two thousand. While touring America, Kho reached the doubles finals of the 1935 Kansas City Championships with Lewis D. Carson, losing to Wilbur Coen and William Kiley. The same year, he debuted in the Davis Cup against the United States Davis Cup team and lost all three of his rubbers.

Kho won numerous tournaments in Europe, most notably winning the British Hard Court Championships twice, in 1938 and 1939 and was a runner-up in 1946.

In 1934, he was scheduled to represent his country at the 1934 Far Eastern Games, which was cancelled. He met Giorgio de Stefani again for the Dutch Championships in 1936, losing to him. Also in 1936, he reached the fourth round of the 1936 French Championships in singles and reached the third round of the mixed doubles with Mademoiselle Terwinot.

In the New Year's Eve tournament of 1936–1937 at the Beausite L.T.C. de Cannes, he defeated Vladimir Landau and won the doubles as well with him. At the same event, he and miss Simonne Mathieu won the mixed contest. In January 1937, he won the Monegasque Championships against Gaston Médécin. In February, he captured the Gallia L.T.C. de Cannes title, beating home favorite Jacques Brugnon in straight sets. They paired for the doubles of the Nice Lawn Tennis Club where they triumphed over Jean Lesueur and William Robertson. Kho also took the singles trophy. Also in February at Carlton Club of Cannes, Brugnon and Kho were on the opposite side in the mixed semifinals where they teamed with Simone Matthieu and Nancy Liebert respectively. In the end, the French couple advanced to the finals. For the men's doubles, Brugnon and Robertson formed a team this time and met in the final with Kho and Landau. In May, he clinched the Priory tournament from Daniel Prenn. In July, he won the Midlands Counties tournament in Edgbaston. In September, he was in both singles and doubles finals of the Hungarian International Championships in Budapest. He was a finalist for the Paris International Championships in the same month where he was beaten by Croatian Franjo Punčec.

In March 1938 at the International Championships of Cairo, he was defeated by Roderich Menzel in the semifinals. In April, he defended his South of France title against Swiss Max Ellmer and this time gained the doubles crown with Brugnon. In May, defeated Bunny Austin for the British Hard Court Championships title and won the doubles title as well with Irishman George Lyttleton-Rogers against the British duo of Donald Butler and Frank Wilde. In June, he reached the Queen's Club Championships final, defeated by Bunny Austin. In October, he won the Sussex Club title in Brighton from Dennis Coombe of New Zealand. Later that month, he reached the fourth round of the 1938 Wimbledon Championships, scoring victories over Harold Hare, Georg von Metaxa and Ian Collins. In September he competed at the Swiss International Championships held in Luzern, where he won the singles title against Roland Journu.

In February 1939, he won his second Gallia championships in singles and doubles with Jacques Brugnon. In March, Brugnon and Kho lost the International Championships of Cairo doubles to the team of Gottfried von Cramm and Pat Hughes. In April, he claimed his first Italian trophy at the L.T.C. di Rome International Championships, defeating Constantin Tanacescu for the title. In May, he took the Surrey Grass Court Championships against Murray Deloford in straight sets. Later that year, he won the Hastings tournament.

In 1940 and 1941, Kho won the Malayan Championships. In 1945, he won the Midland Counties Championships for the second time and retained his title the next year against Argentine Enrique Morea. In 1946, he went for the North of England Championships title at Scarborough, but was eliminated in both the singles and doubles finals by Jack Edwin Harper and Harper-Cam Malfroy respectively. In May, he served the first and only Davis Cup victory for the First Republic of China by winning all three of his rubbers against the Denmark Davis Cup team. While in London on 31 January 1947, Kho was admitted to hospital with double pneumonia and died soon after.

Kho appeared in six Davis Cup ties for China from 1935 to 1946. He won eight of his 18 rubbers. In the club level scene he represented the International Tennis Club of Great Britain.

== World War II ==
On January 27, 1940 he married Jane Margaret Gordon Balfour, daughter of E.J. Gordon Balfour, a judge in Ceylon. They met in England at the Queen's Club where both of them practised. They moved to the Dutch East Indies and stayed there for the time of the war. In order to help his country against the Empire of Japan he participated in a series of exhibition matches with Englishman Pat Hughes in the Malacca Lawn Tennis Club. The ticket sales income was transferred to the Malaya Patriotic Fund and the War Fund. In 1940 he became Malayan Champion in singles and mixed doubles. He continued on to get featured in exhibition matches in 1941.

== Playing style ==
In a 1938 article contemporary Australian tennis player and subsequent chairman of Lawn Tennis Association of Victoria Mervyn Weston described Kho as a drop shot expert, who has a fine control over the ball disguising it so well that it reached a "deadly effect". He had a whipped forehand accompanied by an excellent net game and service and assisted by a formidable backhand. He possessed an athletic body type with a height of 5'11". He was a calm but opportunistic player.

== ILTF titles ==
=== Singles (40) (incomplete list) ===
| No | Year | Tournament | City | Surface | Opponent | Score |
|---|---|---|---|---|---|---|
| 1. | 1937 | Cannes Beau Site New Year Meeting | Cannes | Clay | (Soviet Union) Vladimir M. Landau | 4–6, 6–4, 7–5, 5–7, 6–0 |
| 2. | 1937 | Monegasque Championships | Monte Carlo | Clay | (Monaco) Gaston Médécin | 6–3, 6–2, 6–3 |
| 3. | 1937 | Cannes Gallia | Cannes | Clay | (France) Jacques Brugnon | 6–4, 6–3, 6–4 |
| 4. | 1937 | South of France Championships | Nice | Clay | (France) Jean Lesueur | 13–11, 6–3, 4–6, 6–3 |
| 5. | 1937 | Athena Open | Athens | Clay | (Greece) Lazaros Stalios | 6–4, 2–2, ret. |
| 6. | 1937 | Mediterranean Championships | Athens | Clay | (Italy) Giorgio de Stefani | 9–7, 3–6, 10–8, 7–5 |
| 7. | 1937 | Nice 2nd Meeting | Nice | Clay | (Austria) Adam Baworowski | 6–4, 6–0, 6–4 |
| 8. | 1937 | Hungarian International Championships | Budapest | Clay | (Austria) Adam Baworowski | 7–5, 6–1, 4–6, 6–3 |
| 9. | 1937 | Nice Grand Prix | Nice | Clay | (Austria) Adam Baworowski | 6–1, 2–6, 6–0, 8–6 |
| 10. | 1938 | Cannes Carlton Club | Cannes | Clay | (United States) William Robertson | 6–3, 6–1, 6–3 |
| 11. | 1938 | South of France Championships | Nice | Clay | (Switzerland) Max Ellmer | 6–1, 2–6, 6–0, 8–6 |
| 12. | 1938 | British Hard Court Championships | Bournemouth | Clay | (United Kingdom) Bunny Austin | 6–4, 6–4, 3–6, 6–3 |
| 13. | 1938 | International Championships of Alexandria | Alexandria | Clay | (Kingdom of Yugoslavia) Dragutin Mitić | 6–2, 6–4, 10–8 |
| 14. | 1938 | Nice Grand Prix | Nice | Clay | (Switzerland) Max Ellmer | 6–1, 2–6, 6–0, 8–6 |
| 15. | 1939 | Cannes Gallia | Cannes | Clay | (Republic of Ireland) George Lyttleton-Rogers | 6–4, 7–5, 6–2 |
| 16. | 1939 | Cannes Carlton Club | Cannes | Clay | (Republic of Ireland) George Lyttleton-Rogers | 6–3, 6–4, 6–0 |
| 17. | 1939 | Torneo Circolo Canottieri Roma | Rome | Clay | (Romania) Constantin Tănăsescu | 3–6, 6–0, 6–2, 6–3 |
| 18. | 1939 | British Hard Court Championships | Bournemouth | Clay | (Republic of China (1912–1949)) Choy Wai-Chuen | 7–5, 6–1, 6–4 |
| 19. | 1939 | Surrey Grass Court Championships | Surbiton | Grass | (United Kingdom) Murray Deloford | 6–2, 6–4 |
| 20. | 1946 | Midland Counties Championships | Edgbaston | Grass | (Republic of China (1912–1949)) Choy Wai-Chuen | 7–5, 6–1, 6–4 |
| 21. | 1946 | West of England Championships | Bristol | Grass | (Poland) Ignacy Tłoczyński | 6–4, 6–4 |
