= Adam Baworowski =

Austrian-Polish tennis player (1913–1943)

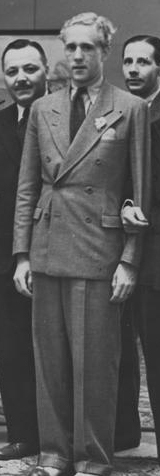
- Baworowski (center), during a reception for the 1939 Davis Cup match between Poland and China
- Country (sports): Austria (1918–38); Poland (1938–41) (Nazi Germany) Germany (1941–43)
- Born: 9 August 1913 Vienna, Austria-Hungary
- Died: 1943 (aged 29) Stalingrad, USSR
- Turned pro: 1929 (amateur tour)
- Retired: 1941
- Plays: Right-handed (one-handed backhand)

Singles

Grand Slam singles results
- French Open: 4R (1937, 1938)
- Wimbledon: 1R (1933, 1936, 1939)

Doubles

Grand Slam doubles results
- French Open: SF (1939)
- Wimbledon: 2R (1936, 1939)

Mixed doubles

Grand Slam mixed doubles results
- French Open: 2R (1937)
- Wimbledon: 2R (1936, 1939)

Team competitions
- Davis Cup: SF^{Eu} (1936)

Count Adam Baworowski (Polish pronunciation: [ˈadam bavɔˈrɔfskʲi]; 9 August 1913 – 1943) was an Austrian-Polish tennis player.

== Biography ==
=== Early life and family ===
Count Adam Baworowski descended from the Polish noble family Baworowski. He was the son of Count Rudolf Baworow-Baworowski (1865–1931) and Austrian Countess Maria Chorinsky von Ledske (1876–1963), the former who was the Chamberlain of Franz Joseph I of Austria and had estates in Lviv and where Adam often spent his childhood years. He had three brothers and three sisters, Emil, Stefan, Rudolf, Matylda, Marya and Franciszka. He went to school in Vienna and as the family spoke German at home Adam was alienated from his Polish roots in the beginning.

He started playing tennis at a very early age and started taking coaching lessons from the Van Dycków brothers. He attended the tennis club at the Prater where he had a chance to meet Georg von Metaxa, his later Davis Cup teammate and friend. In 1927, he had a victory over Henner Henkel at the Youth Games. In 1929, at the age of 13 he already defeated then-Polish champion Maximilian Stolarow. In 1931, he won the Austrian junior tennis championships as well as the international junior championships of Berlin in singles and doubles. He was ranked tenth on the Austrian rankings. The next year he was classified fifth. While in 1934 he climbed to number four on the same list. In 1935, he won the national singles and doubles championships and drew attention with back to back straight victories against famed players Franz Wilhelm Matejka and Hermann Artens to be crowned champion. Subsequently, he rose to the second place after Matejka. Later he became member of the Wiener Park Club.

=== International tennis career ===
Baworowski was first drafted into the Austrian Davis Cup troupe in 1933 only for the doubles rubber teaming with Herbert Kinzl with whom he reached the doubles finals of the Sheffield tournament later that year. He played again in the Cup in 1936 along with Georg von Metaxa and reached the semifinals of the European zone. He won the Austrian Championships in the same year. He twice won the International Polish Championship of Warsaw in the doubles partnering Pat Hughes in 1933 and Hans Redl in 1937. He was twice finalist in Budapest in 1935 and 1937. In 1937, he still held the second spot on the Austrian rankings next to von Metaxa.

In 1936, he won the Capri tournament meeting Jacques Jamain in the championship match. He also won the mixed doubles with Toto Zehden. In January 1937 he lost the doubles final in Saint Moritz, playing with von Metaxa, to Frenchmen Christian Boussus and Paul Féret. In March he lost the Nice title to Kho Sin-Kie in straight sets. At the same tournament he reached the double final as well with von Metaxa. In April he clinched the Monegasque Championships by beating Marcel Bernard in a five set match. He also took the doubles title with von Metaxa defeating Daniel Prenn and Vladimir Landau. In March 1938 he was victorious at the Cannes L.T.C. tournament where he eliminated Swedish champion Karl Schroeder. Schroeder took revenge in the doubles final where he teamed up with seasoned player Jacques Brugnon of the Four Musketeers to stop the Baworowski-von Metaxa duo in a five set match.

At the French Championships, Baworowski reached the fourth round in 1937 and 1938. At Wimbledon, he lost his initial match on three occasions (1933, 1936, 1939). After the "Anschluss", the annexation of Austria into Nazi Germany, in March 1938, Baworowski decided to join the Polish Davis Cup team as he didn't want to lose his family's estates in Poland.

Upon arrival in Poland he gave a few interviews, condemning the "Anschluss" and the policy of the Nazi authorities. His statements were widely covered in the Western media. He joined the Legia Warsaw and on 3 May 1938 he participated in a friendly match between Poland and Germany, and a few days later played in a match in a Legia Warsaw-Stockholm meeting. He quickly moved up to second place on the list of Polish Tennis Association right behind Ignacy Tłoczyński. He was victorious again in the doubles at the Katowice tournament partnering Tłoczyński and the duo represented Poland in the Central European Cup and claimed the trophy after beating Yugoslavia and Czechoslovakia.

The last peaceful season in 1939 kicked off well for him. The Ministry of Foreign Affairs sponsored Baworowski French Riviera tour and it paid off well. At Cannes he was only beaten in the final by Yvon Petra. In Juan-les-Pins he proved to be unstoppable and defeated Robert Abdesselam for the title and carried on this streak at Nice through the final against Antoine Gentien. After this great season opener he suffered injury, which affected his Davis Cup tie against Germany and in the French Championships. However he was a doubles semifinalist along with Ignacy Tłoczyński at Roland Garros. Despite his bad shape he still secured the Polish National Doubles championship alongside Tłoczyński.

=== World War II and death ===
At the outbreak of World War II, after returning from Monaco with a silver medal of the 1939 International University Games Baworowski was residing in Paris where his family lived. When he heard about the outbreak of the war he was determined to join the Polish army although his parents begged him to stay. When he arrived to the East Railway Station of Warsaw, the German Luftwaffe was already bombarding the area. The passengers fled from the trains to nearby trenches. Apparently he was successfully enlisted. The next time he met his cousin Eugene Paul Baworowski in the streets of Warsaw in the first days of occupation he was about to get in touch with the Polish Resistance. As the 6 September 1939 decree issued by the Wehrmacht command pursued every Polish citizen who reached the military age to be sent to a POW camp the Gestapo soon arrested and sent him to a camp. Only his ties to the Chorinsky von Ledske noble family and to the former Austrian Tennis Federation saved him from further reprisals.

In 1941, he took part in the German war championships at Braunschweig and reached the final which he lost to Kurt Gies in five sets. He was practising in the Rot-Weiss Tennis Club of Berlin. He further represented Germany in the Danube Cup, which was a wartime substitute for the Central European Cup. Baworowski later joined the Wehrmacht Heer. He served as a Hauptmann during the Battle of Stalingrad. On December 21, 1942, when the Luftwaffe evacuated his troops, he ceded his place on the last flight to a heavily injured soldier and decided to stay in the trenches with his subordinates. He was hit by the Soviets in the beginning of 1943 and died in agony without receiving any medical help.

== Playing style ==
According to Kordian Tarasiewicz, contemporary senior Polish tennis Player Baworowski "[...] was a well established tennis player on the European courts and represented a versatile offensive [style], especially had a well mastered game at the net".

== Ancestry ==
Ancestors of Adam Baworowski

16. Mateusz Tadeusz Baworow
8. Adam Jan Kanty Wolfgang Baworów-Baworowski
17. Thekla Ryszczewska
4. Josef Maria Matthäus Graf Baworowski
18. Jozsef Kalasanty Lewicka
9. Emilie Rosalie Katharina Lewicka
19. Katarzyna Kaczkowska
2. Rudolf Baworów-Baworowski
20. Johann Dominik, Graf zu Hardegg auf Glatz und im Machlande
10. Johann Maximilian Graf zu Hardegg auf Glatz u. im Machlande
21. Maria Maximiliane von Althann
5. Franziska Dominika Maximiliane Gräfin zu Hardegg auf Glatz und im Machlande
22. Eugen Dominik Rudolf von Wrbna und Freudenthal
11. Franziska Xaverie Gräfin von Wrbna und Freudenthal
23. Mária Borbála Erdődy de Monyorókerék et Monoszló
1. Adam Baworowski
24. Franz Cajetan Graf Chorinsky von Ledske
12. Friedrich Chorinsky Freiherr von Ledske
25. Constanze Leopoldine Franziska, Landgräfin zu Fürstenberg
6. Victor Paul Graf von Chorinsky Freiherr von Ledske
26. Paul III Anton, Prince Esterházy
13. Maria Theresia Esterházy of Galántha
27. Princess Maria Theresia of Thurn and Taxis
3. Franziska (Fanny) Anna Gräfin von Chorinsky Freiin von Ledske
28. Johann Nepomuk Josef Norbert von und zu Trauttmansdorff-Weinsberg
14. Ferdinand Joachim Fürst von und zu Trauttmansdorf-Weinsberg
29. Elisabeth Maria Philippa von Fürstenberg
7. Maria Anna Franziska Gravin von und zu Trauttmansdorff-Weinsberg
30. Karl Borromäus Franz Anton von und zu Liechtenstein
15. Anna von und zu Liechtenstein
31. Franziska Gräfin von Wrbna-Freudenthal

== Works cited ==
=== Online media ===
- Chmielewski, Zbigniew (14 September 2013). "Adam Baworowski na kortach Wiednia i Warszawy" [Adam Baworowski on the courts of Vienna and Warsaw]. Sportowa Historia (in Polish). Warsaw, Poland: Stowarzyszenie SportowaHistoria.PL ul. ISSN 2084-1647.
- Roepstorff, Jens (23 November 2013). "23. November 1943: Tod des Tennisspielers Kurt Gies" [23 November 1943: Death of tennis player Kurt Gies]. www.muelheim-ruhr.de (in German). Archived from the original on 27 June 2016.

=== Books ===
- Konecki, Tadeusz (2003). Stalingrad (in Polish). Bellona Publishing House. ISBN 8311094527.
- Kaiser, Ulrich (2002). "Weltgeschichte und die Regel 33". In Deutscher Tennis Bund (ed.). Tennis in Deutschland. Von den Anfängen bis 2002 [Tennis in Germany. From the beginnings to 2002.] (in German). Berlin: Duncker & Humblot. pp. 159–161. ISBN 3-428-10846-9.

=== Periodicals ===
- "Sheffield tennis tournament" (pdf). The Canberra Times. VII (1, 799). Canberra, Australia: Federal Capital Press of Australia: 1. 31 July 1933.
- François Coty, ed. (November 2, 1932). "Tennis". Le Figaro (in French) (307). Paris, France: Dassault Group: 7. ISSN 0182-5852.
- François Coty, ed. (April 5, 1937). "Marcel Bernard est battu par Bawarowski á Monte Carlo" [Marcel Bernard is beaten by Bawarowski in Monte Carlo]. Le Figaro (in French) (95). Paris, France: Dassault Group: 7. ISSN 0182-5852.
- François Coty, ed. (March 21, 1937). "Kho-Sin-Kie vainqueur á Nice" [Kho-Sin-Kie victor at Nice]. Le Figaro (in French) (80). Paris, France: Dassault Group: 8. ISSN 0182-5852.
- François Coty, ed. (March 22, 1938). "Les finales du Tournoi du Cannes L.T.C." [Cannes L.T.C. finals]. Le Figaro (in French) (81). Paris, France: Dassault Group: 8. ISSN 0182-5852.
- François Coty, ed. (January 10, 1937). "Victoires françaises au Tournoi de Saint-Moritz" [French victories at the Saint-Moritz tournament]. Le Figaro (in French) (10). Paris, France: Dassault Group: 8. ISSN 0182-5852.
- François Coty, ed. (September 16, 1936). "Bavarowsky". Le Figaro (in French) (260). Paris, France: Dassault Group: 8. ISSN 0182-5852.
- "Mariages". Le Gaulois (in French). 36 (7796). Paris, France: Arthur Meyer: 2. August 5, 1901.
- "Gabrovitz Emil nyerte az UTE jubiláris teniszversenyét" [Emil Gabrowitz won the UTE tennis tournament] (in Hungarian). Budapest, Hungary: Huszadik század. April 1935.
- "Magyarország 1937. évi teniszbajnokságai" [1937 Hungarian tennis championships] (in Hungarian). Budapest, Hungary: Huszadik század. September 1937.
- Henry Archacki (November 12, 1937). "Najlepsi tenisiści Austrii i Anglii" [The best tennis players of Austria and England] (PDF). Ilustrowana Republika (in Polish). XV (311). Łódź, Poland: Leszek Kirkien, Władyslaw Polak: 7. Archived from the original (PDF) on December 3, 2013.
- "Ostatnie lato na Riwierze" [Last summer on the Riviera]. Rzeczpospolita (in Polish). Warsaw, Poland: Gremi Media. December 31, 2003. ISSN 0208-9130.
- "Lawn Tennis team visiting India". The Straits Times. Singapore, Straits Settlements: Straits Times Press: 14. November 9, 1935.
- "Italian Ranking list". The Sydney Morning Herald. 104 (30, 298). Sydney, Australia: John Fairfax and Sons: 15. February 11, 1935.
- Gillmeister, Heiner (2002). "Georg von Metaxa: Eine Reminiszenz zum 100-jährigen Jubiläum des österreichischen und des deutschen Tennisverbandes". Stadion. International Journal of the History of Sport. 28 (1): 53–76.

== See also ==
- Baworowscy Library
- List of Polish noble families with the title of Count
