= Gies Kerzen =

Gies Kerzen GmbH a German manufacturer of candles and is one of the largest candle makers in Europe. It was founded in 1899 by Adam Joseph Gies under the name Wachsindustrie Fulda Adam Gies (Adam Gies wax works at Fulda). In 1921, a second facility was constructed in the village of Bergedorf, Hamburg under the name Gebrüder Gies (Gies Brothers). In 1965, the headquarters were moved to Glinde, Schleswig-Holstein. Today, the company is owned by the Swedish firm ALG Holding A.B. and has five European factories. It has 500 employees and annual sales of €100 million.
