= Friedrich Rohrer =

Czech tennis player (1895–1945)

Personal information
- Nationality: Czech
- Born: 14 May 1895; Brno, Austria-Hungary
- Died: 26 April 1945 (aged 49); Landeck, Alpine and Danube Reichsgaue, Nazi Germany

Sport
- Sport: Tennis

Friedrich Rohrer (14 May 1895 – 26 April 1945) was a Czech tennis player. He competed in the men's singles and doubles events at the 1924 Summer Olympics.
