= Georges Glasser =

French tennis player (1907–2002)

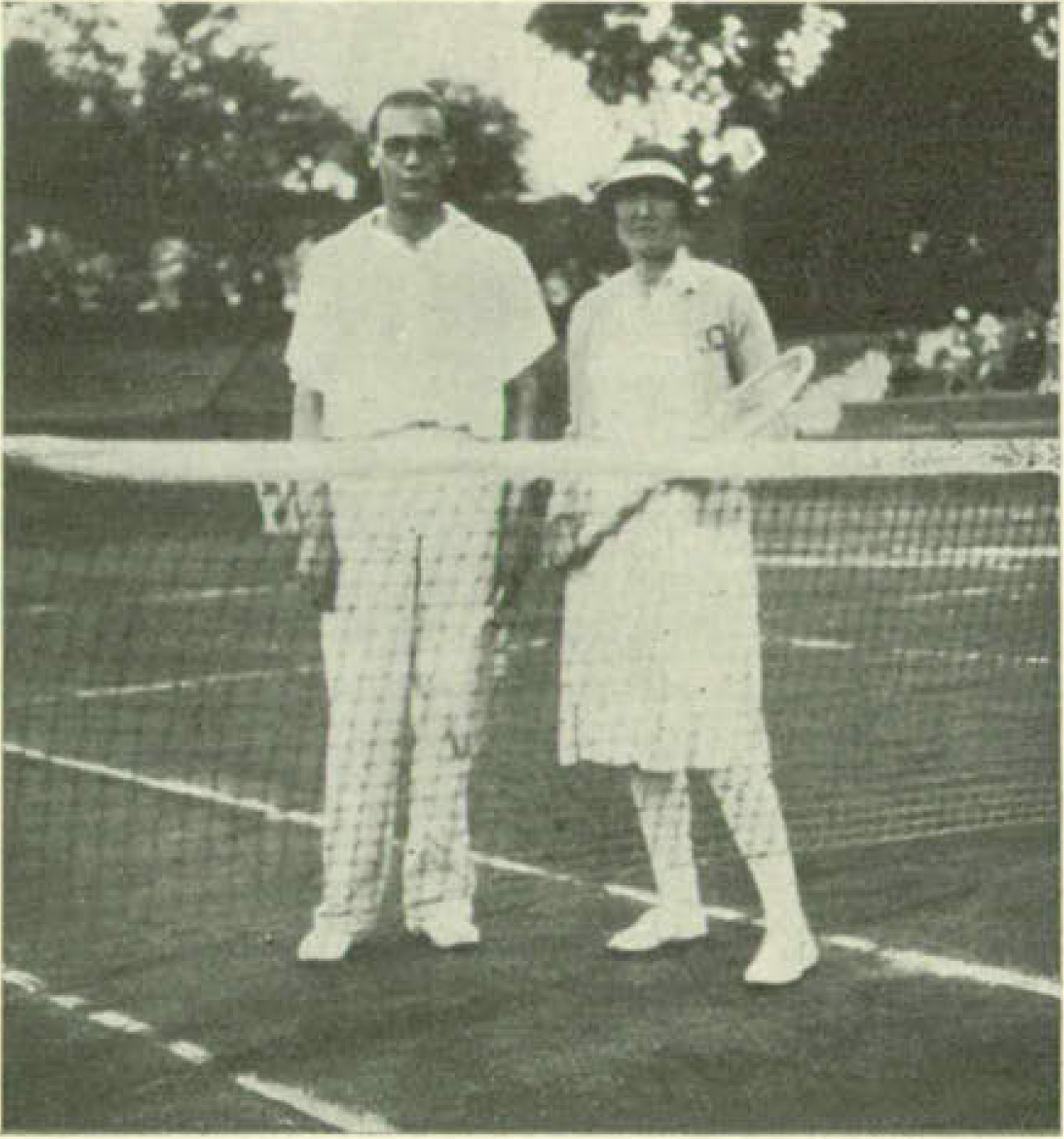
- Georges Glasser and Simone Barbier at the 1930 Hungarian International Tennis Championships
- Country (sports): France
- Born: 24 August 1907 Paris, France
- Died: January 2002 (aged 94–95)
- Turned pro: 1928
- Retired: 1939

Singles
- Career titles: 2

Grand Slam singles results
- French Open: 3R (1929, 1930)
- Wimbledon: 2R (1930)

Doubles
- Career titles: 4

Grand Slam doubles results
- French Open: 1R (1929)
- Wimbledon: 1R (1929, 1930)

Mixed doubles
- Career titles: 4

Grand Slam mixed doubles results
- French Open: 1R (1929)

Georges Glasser (French pronunciation: [ʒɔʁʒ glaːse]; 24 August 1907 – January 2002) was a French tennis player, corporate executive and president of the Tennis Club de Paris. As a player, he was particularly successful in mixed doubles claiming several titles during his career. He was ranked the 8th among the top French players in 1932.

== Biography ==
He was born in Paris 24 August 1907, son of the general manager of the Compagnie Générale des Eaux, George Glasser graduated at the École Polytechnique in 1926. In 1931 he became an engineer at the École nationale des ponts et chaussées. The same year he became the assistant to the Director General of the Préfecture des Hauts-de-Seine and also the member of Corps of Bridges and Roads. In 1948 he was elected the president of the National Society of Southwest aircraft constructions (SNCASO) in 1948, while also acting as the vice president of French state-owned aircraft manufacturer Sud Aviation. He persuaded his devotion to tennis by being the president of the Tennis Club de Paris in 1951–1965, the club which he played for when he had been an active sportsman. In 1957 he was appointed president of the Society for the Study of jet Propulsion (SEPR) and finally chief executive of Alsthom between 1958 and 1975. Died in January 2002.

== Tennis finals ==
=== Singles ===
Legend (singles)
Grand Slam tournaments
Invitational Cups
International Championships (2)

==== Finals (1) ====
Result	No.	Year	Tournament	Surface	Opponent	Score
Win	1.	1931	Swiss International Championships, Geneve	N/A	(France) Antoine Gentien	w/o
Win	2.	1931	Villa d'Este	N/A	(Italy) Emanuele Sertorio	0–6, 6–4, 6–3, 6–3

=== Doubles ===
Legend (singles)
Grand Slam tournaments (0)
Invitational Cups (2)
International Championships (6)

==== Finals (6) ====
Result	No.	Year	Tournament	Surface	Partner	Opponents	Score
Win	1.	1930	Coupe de Noël	Clay	(France) Jean Borotra	(Chile) Domingo Torralva-Ponsa (Chile) Luis Torralva-Ponsa	8–6, 6–4, 11–9
Win	2.	1931	Coupe de Noël	Clay	(France) Jean Borotra	(France) Antoine Gentien (France) Paul Féret	6–3, 6–1, 6–4
Win	3.	1931	Livorno	N/A	(France) Jacques Bonte	(Italy) Oscar de Minerbi (Italy) Clemente Serventi	6–2, 6–3, 6–4
Win	4.	1931	Villa d'Este	N/A	(Austria) Ludwig von Salm-Hoogstraeten	(Germany) Heinrich Kleinschroth (United Kingdom) Hillyard	6–2, 6–2, 6–1
Loss	1.	1931	Lucerne	N/A	(Denmark) Erik Worm	(France) Jean Lesueur (United Kingdom) John Olliff	8–6, 6–1, 1–6, 6–3
Loss	2.	1931	Meran	Clay	(France) Emmanuel du Plaix	(France) Jean Lesueur (Switzerland) Hector Fisher	6–3, 6–2, 1–6, 6–3

==== Mixed doubles (5) ====
Result	No.	Year	Tournament	Surface	Partner	Opponents	Score
Win	1.	1930	Hungarian Tennis Championships	Clay	(France) Simone Barbier	(Weimar Republic) Fritz Kuhlmann (Weimar Republic) Hilde Krahwinkel Sperling	5–7, 8–6, 6–4
Win	2.	1931	Saint Moritz	Clay	(France) Arlette Neufeld	(Weimar Republic) Philipp Buss (Weimar Republic) Ilse Friedleben	6–1, 6–3
Win	3.	1931	Czechoslovak Championships	Clay	(France) Simonne Mathieu	(Czechoslovakia) Josef Síba (Weimar Republic) Hilde Krahwinkel Sperling	6–4, 6–4
Win	4.	1931	Lucerne	Clay	(Switzerland) Lolette Payot	(Egypt) Pierre Grandguillot (France) Simone Barbier	6–2, 6–0
Loss	1.	1931	Meran	Clay	(United Kingdom) Helen Dyson	(Switzerland) Hector Fisher (Switzerland) Lolette Payot	w/o
