= Frances and Joseph Gies =

American historians

Frances Gies (June 10, 1915 – December 18, 2013) and Joseph Gies (October 8, 1916 – April 13, 2006) were American historians and writers who collaborated on a number of books about the Middle Ages, and also wrote individual works. They were husband and wife. Joseph Gies graduated from the University of Michigan in 1939.

== Select bibliography ==
=== Collaborations ===
- (1969) Life in a Medieval City, ISBN 978-0-06-090880-5
- (1972) Merchants and Moneymen: The Commercial Revolution, 1000-1500 ISBN 978-0-690-53177-0
- (1974) Life in a Medieval Castle Crowell, ISBN 978-0-690-00561-5
- (1979) Life in a Medieval Castle ISBN 978-0-062-01650-8
- (1983) Leonard Of Pisa And The New Mathematics Of The Middle Ages ISBN 978-0-317-57849-2
- (1987) Marriage and the Family in the Middle Ages ISBN 0-06-015791-7
- (1990) Life in a Medieval Village
- (1994) Cathedral, Forge, and Waterwheel : Technology and Invention in the Middle Ages HarperCollins ISBN 0-06-016590-1
- (1999) A Medieval Family: The Pastons of Fifteenth-Century England New York: HarperCollins
- (2005) Daily Life in Medieval Times, UK: Grange Books, 2005 ISBN 1-84013-811-4 (Combining Medieval City, Medieval Castle, Medieval Village)

=== Frances Gies ===
- (1978) Women in the Middle Ages HarperCollins ISBN 978-0-690-01724-3
- (1981) Joan of Arc: The Legend and the Reality HarperCollins ISBN 978-0-690-01942-1
- (1984) The Knight in History HarperCollins ISBN 978-0-06-091413-4
