= Roland Journu =

French tennis player

- Country (sports): France
- Born: 6 August 1906; Bordeaux, France
- Died: 13 June 1989 (aged 82); Bordeaux, France

Singles

Grand Slam singles results
- French Open: 4R (1936, 1937)
- Wimbledon: 2R (1933)

Grand Slam mixed doubles results
- French Open: F (1937)

Roland Raymond Marie Henri Paul Journu (6 August 1906 – 13 June 1989) was a French tennis player.

A Bordeaux native of the Journu family, Journu was most active in the 1930s and counted the Swiss International Championships amongst his tour titles. He made the singles fourth round at Roland Garros in 1936 and 1937. At the 1937 French Championships he was also a mixed doubles finalist with Marie-Louise Horn, losing to Simonne Mathieu and Yvon Petra.

== Grand Slam finals ==
=== Mixed doubles: (1 runner-up) ===
Result	Year	Championship	Surface	Partner	Opponents	Score
Loss	1937	French Championships	Clay	(Nazi Germany) Marie-Louise Horn	(France) Simonne Mathieu (France) Yvon Petra	5–7, 5–7
