= Bernard Destremau =

French tennis player, tank officer, diplomat and politician

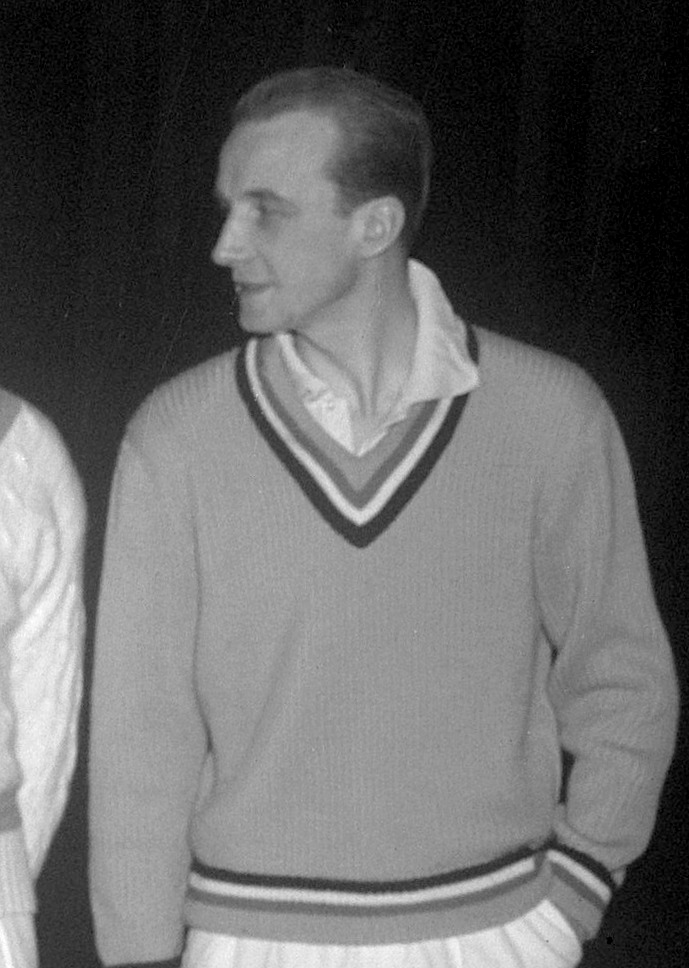
- Bernard Destremau in 1951
- Country (sports): France
- Born: 11 February 1917; Paris, France
- Died: 6 June 2002 (aged 85); Neuilly-sur-Seine, France
- Turned pro: 1934 (amateur tour)
- Retired: 1963
- Plays: Right-handed (one-handed backhand)

Singles

Grand Slam singles results
- French Open: SF (1937)
- Wimbledon: 4R (1951)
- US Open: 4R (1937)

Doubles

Grand Slam doubles results
- French Open: W (1938)
- Wimbledon: 3R (1946, 1950, 1951)

Grand Slam mixed doubles results
- Wimbledon: 4R (1946)

Bernard Destremau (French pronunciation: [bɛʁnaʁ dɛstr.mɔ]; 11 February 1917 – 6 June 2002) was a French tennis player, tank officer, diplomat and politician.

== Biography ==
Born in Paris into a military family, Destremau was the third son of a WWI cavalry general. His success in accommodating competitive tennis with academic, military, diplomatic and political pursuits is distinctive.

A precocious French junior tennis champion in the mid-1930s, Destremau reached the singles semifinals at Roland Garros in 1937 (losing to winner Henner Henkel) and the quarterfinals in 1936 and 1938 before winning the 1938 French Championships doubles (with Yvon Petra, beating Don Budge-Gene Mako). During those years he graduated from HEC (Hautes Etudes Commerciales). Destremau also won the 1941 and the 1942 Tournoi de France which in war-time was not counted as a grand slam event and later, won several national titles including the 1951 and 1953 French National singles championships. He remained an amateur, devoted his tennis mostly to the Davis Cup, the King of Sweden Cup and other French team matches and was ranked Nr. 1 in France for several years. As a veteran he won the Wimbledon over-45 doubles event with Bill Talbert, in 1964. He had been a Wimbledon familiar with numerous Championships' entries (from 1934 to 1955), Davis Cup ties and other fixtures.

At the outbreak of World War II he sailed from New York back to France to be drafted into officer training. In May and June 1940 as a junior liaison officer he saw but little action, fell back with his motorised unit to Montauban and witnessed helplessly the Fall of France and the Armistice. Returning to civil life, Destremau resumed his studies and with a diplomatic career in view, graduated from Sciences Po. He played occasional tennis tournaments in France, North Africa, Spain and Portugal as travel permitted. After the American landing in North Africa he decided to re-enlist and succeeded in escaping through the well-guarded Pyrenees into Spain and thence to Morocco. After joining the Free French forces as a tank platoon officer he submitted to long months of training in various Algerian camps. His platoon landed in Provence in July 1944 as an element of the 1st Army under De Lattre de Tassigny. He fought in Provence, Burgundy, Alsace and the Black Forest, was shot in the back in La Valette-du-Var on the road to the critical port of Toulon and was wounded on two separate engagements by hand-grenade shrapnel. He was awarded the Legion of Honour during the campaign from the hands of De Lattre and the croix de guerre.

After the war, still playing tennis for France, he became a diplomat and was posted to Egypt during the Suez Canal crisis, to South Africa and to Belgium. Venturing into politics he was elected député for Versailles in 1967 and held the seat until 1978, became Secretary of State for Foreign Affairs in 1974, and retired in 1981 after a last post as ambassador to Argentina. In politics he entertained a marked friendship with President Valéry Giscard d'Estaing.

A prolific writer of books on history and politics, he became a member of the French Académie des Sciences Morales et Politiques in 1996. He wrote his autobiography, Le Cinquième Set, and biographies of General Weygand and Marshal de Lattre.

Destremau married Diane de Pracomtal in 1954 and fathered a daughter and two sons. His wife died in December 2016.

His son Christian has written books on WWII intelligence (Garbo; Ce que savaient les Alliés; Le Moyen-Orient pendant la Seconde Guerre Mondiale), a biography of Laurence of Arabia, Churchill et la France, a book about the lifetime relations of Winston Churchill and the French, and biographies of Ian Fleming, the inventor of James Bond, and of King Ibn Saud (2024). To date none of these works have been translated into English.

Sébastien Destremau, the sailing professional who has competed internationally (Sydney to Hobart Yacht Race, Vendée Globe, Route du Rhum) is his great-nephew.

== Grand Slam finals ==
=== Doubles: 1 title ===
| Result | Year | Championship | Surface | Partner | Opponents | Score |
|---|---|---|---|---|---|---|
| Win | 1938 | French Championships | Clay | (France) Yvon Petra | (United States) Don Budge (United States) Gene Mako | 3–6, 6–3, 9–7, 6–1 |
