= Dragutin Mitić =

Croatian tennis player (1917–1986)

- Country (sports): Yugoslavia
- Born: 16 September 1917 Zagreb, Austria-Hungary (modern-day Croatia)
- Died: 27 August 1986 (aged 68) Houston, Texas, U.S.
- Plays: Right-handed (one-handed backhand)

Singles
- Highest ranking: No. 5 (The Star magazine)

Grand Slam singles results
- French Open: QF (1938, 1946, 1949)
- Wimbledon: 4R (1938, 1946)
- US Open: 3R (1939)

Doubles

Grand Slam doubles results
- Wimbledon: SF (1946)

Mixed doubles

Grand Slam mixed doubles results
- French Open: W (1938)
- Wimbledon: 3R (1939, 1950)

Team competitions
- Davis Cup: F (1939)

Dragutin Mitić (Serbo-Croatian Cyrillic: Драгутин Митић, pronounced [draɡǔtin mǐːtitɕ]; 16 September 1917 – 27 August 1986) was a tennis player from Yugoslavia. He defected to the West in 1952 and afterwards lived in the United States.

== Early life and family ==
Dragutin Mitić was born in Zagreb on 16 September 1917. He was nicknamed Dragec. His first tennis performance was an instant success. In 1932 he played at the national junior championships and won. At eighteen, he competed in Bled and upset Czechoslovak Josef Caska, and brought home the mixed doubles with Hella Kovač. He made his Davis Cup debut in 1936. That same year he traveled to South Africa and, although he didn't return with any major result, gained international experience.

== Tennis career ==
Mitić played tennis for Zagreb clubs Akademski teniski klub ATK, between 1935 and 1940, Slavija in 1946, Dinamo in 1947–48, Naprijed in 1949, and ZTK in 1951. He played for the Kingdom of Yugoslavia Davis Cup team, first at the International Lawn Tennis Challenge, and later the Davis Cup, from 1936 to 1951.

Mitić's breakthrough year was in 1938 with back-to-back victories over well-established names such as Czechoslovak Roderich Menzel, French Christian Boussus, and Ignacy Tłoczyński in matches in Alexandria, Cairo, and Beaulieu, respectively. In Nice, he lost to Kho Sin-Kie. He also did well in two big tournaments. At the 1938 Wimbledon Championships – Men's singles he dropped out of the Australian Mervyn Weston in four sets, then Argentine Alejo Russell in five, and Brazilian Alcides Procopio in three, losing in the fourth round to Max Ellmer. In the Roland Garros he advanced one more round into the quarterfinals, but there won only one game against Menzel. He booked his first and only Grand Slam title (as it was called in the Open era) in the mixed doubles, where he and Simonne Mathieu rebounded from a one-set disadvantage against Nancye Wynne Bolton and Boussus to achieve their biggest feat.

In 1939 Mitić made a name for himself on the French Riviera tennis circuit. In Monaco he beat Adam Baworowski, and in Bordighera, the home favorite Giorgio de Stefani, claiming the title in both tournaments. In Cairo he won the mixed doubles with his partner, Billie Yorke. After World War II he won the first post-war tournament in Budapest, the Hungarian Tennis Championships, from József Asbóth, along with the doubles with partner Josip Pallada, and the mixed doubles. He also won five consecutive singles titles in the Yugoslavian Nationals from 1946 to 1950.

In 1947 Mitić repeated his Hungarian success and became a two-time singles champion. In 1948 he won the Czechoslovakia International doubles tournament with Palada. In 1950 he was crowned Indian champion in the mixed doubles category, teaming with Patricia Canning Todd.

Mitić defected to the West together with Milan Branović while competing at the 1952 Italian International Championships.

After his defection in 1952, he lived in New York City, where he opened a tennis center.

== Playing style ==
According to tennis expert Predrag Briksi: "Mitić had a world-class backhand, sharp and accurate, coherent and well coordinated. He had a very good service and refined volley, strong smash, and the only weak point in his refined game was his above-average forehand shot. The Mitić forehand was slightly weaker because it was regularly struck with the weight of the body on the 'wrong foot'. His on-court reach showed vulnerability when it came to movement. He covered a great range from right to the left side, but he was a little slower relative to his front-back reach. He was excellent at baseline, and just as good at the net when he went volleying".

== Grand Slam finals ==
=== Mixed doubles: 1 (1 title) ===
Result	Year	Championship	Surface	Partner	Opponents	Score
Win	1938	French Championships	Clay	(France) Simonne Mathieu	(Australia) Nancye Wynne (France) Christian Boussus	2–6, 6–3, 6–4

== Sources ==
- Šoškić, Čedomir (2012). Тениски савез Србије Тенис без граници 1922–2012. [Tennis Association of Serbia, Tennis without borders 1922-2012] (PDF) (in Serbian). Belgrade, Serbia: Tennis Association of Serbia. p. 284. Archived from the original (PDF) on 30 December 2013.
- Ravlić, Slaven (2013). "Mitić, Dragutin". Croatian Encyclopedia (in Croatian). Zagreb, Croatia: Miroslav Krleža Lexicographical Institute.
- "Mitics három bajnokságot nyert a magyar nemzetközi teniszbajnokságon" [Mitic won three championships at the Hungarian Internationals] (in Hungarian). Budapest, Hungary: Huszadik század. September 1945.
