= Paul Féret =

French tennis player (1901–1984)

- Full name: Paul J.A. Féret
- Country (sports): France
- Born: 27 July 1901 Paris, France
- Died: 3 February 1984 (aged 82) Paris, France
- Plays: Right-handed (one-handed backhand)

Singles

Grand Slam singles results
- French Open: QF (1925)
- Wimbledon: 4R (1932)

Other tournaments
- WHCC: 3R (1923)

Team competitions
- Davis Cup: F (1925^{Ch})

Paul Féret (French pronunciation: [pɔl feʁe]; 27 July 1901 – 3 February 1984) was a French international tennis player in the 1920s and 1930s. Born in Paris, he competed in the Davis Cup two times in 1925.

== Amateur, to professional, back to amateur ==
Féret was one of the first French amateur players to lose his amateur status and play for money. After Suzanne Lenglen became a professional player in 1926 and was stripped of her No. 1 ranking by the Fédération Française de Tennis, she was seeking a mixed doubles partner for a paid tour in America, but her preferred choice, a young Italian lawyer named Placido Gaslini, was not allowed by his father, a Milanese banker, to play for money. Instead, Lenglen and her agent, C. C. Pyle, picked Féret, then the fourth-ranked French amateur, who was offered the chance to partner Lenglen. Féret, who was in depression following the death of his wife, agreed to sail to America, though it would mean losing his amateur status. When Pyle's tour opened at Madison Square Garden to an elite audience including Mayor Jimmy Walker and other rich and famous, Féret was quickly defeated by Pyle's star player, American No. 1 Vincent Richards. When Féret returned to France after the tour, having earned $10,000, he applied for reinstatement as an amateur on grounds of emotional stress and exceptionally was accepted back into membership in 1929 (or 1933), after he donated his winnings in America. He continued to play as an amateur, on one occasion putting an end to the hopes of a tennis career of a young scientist, Louis Leprince-Ringuet. In 1953 (aged 51), Feret was the oldest competitor ever in the French Championships men's singles event.
