= List of Wimbledon ladies' doubles champions =

Wimbledon Ladies’ Doubles Champions
- Location: London; United Kingdom
- Venue: AELTC
- Governing body: AELTC / LTA
- Created: 1913
- Surface: Grass
- Prize money: £ 600,000 (2023)
- Website: wimbledon.com

Most titles
- Amateur era: Elizabeth Ryan
- Open era: 7: Martina Navratilova

Most consecutive titles
- Amateur era: 5: Suzanne Lenglen; Elizabeth Ryan
- Open era: 4: Martina Navratilova

Current champion
- Guo Hanyu; Kristina Mladenovic

The champions and runners-up of the Wimbledon Championships Ladies' Doubles tournament, first introduced to the championship in 1913. From 1915 to 1918, and from 1940 to 1945, no competition was held due to the two World Wars.

== Finalists ==
=== Amateur Era ===
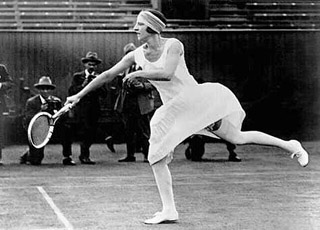
Suzanne Lenglen won six women's doubles titles in the 1920s partnering Elizabeth Ryan.

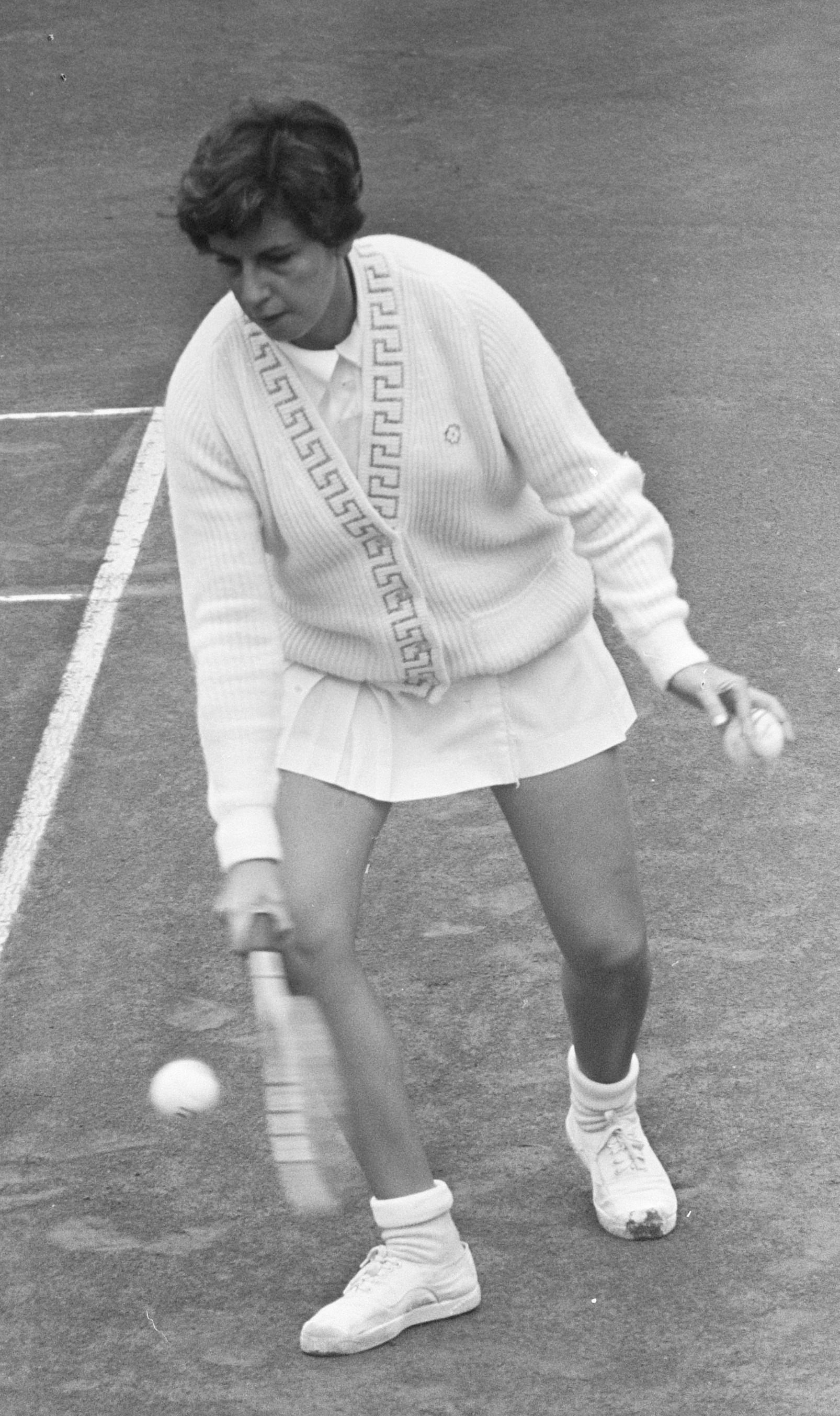
Maria Bueno played in six women's doubles finals and won five of them.

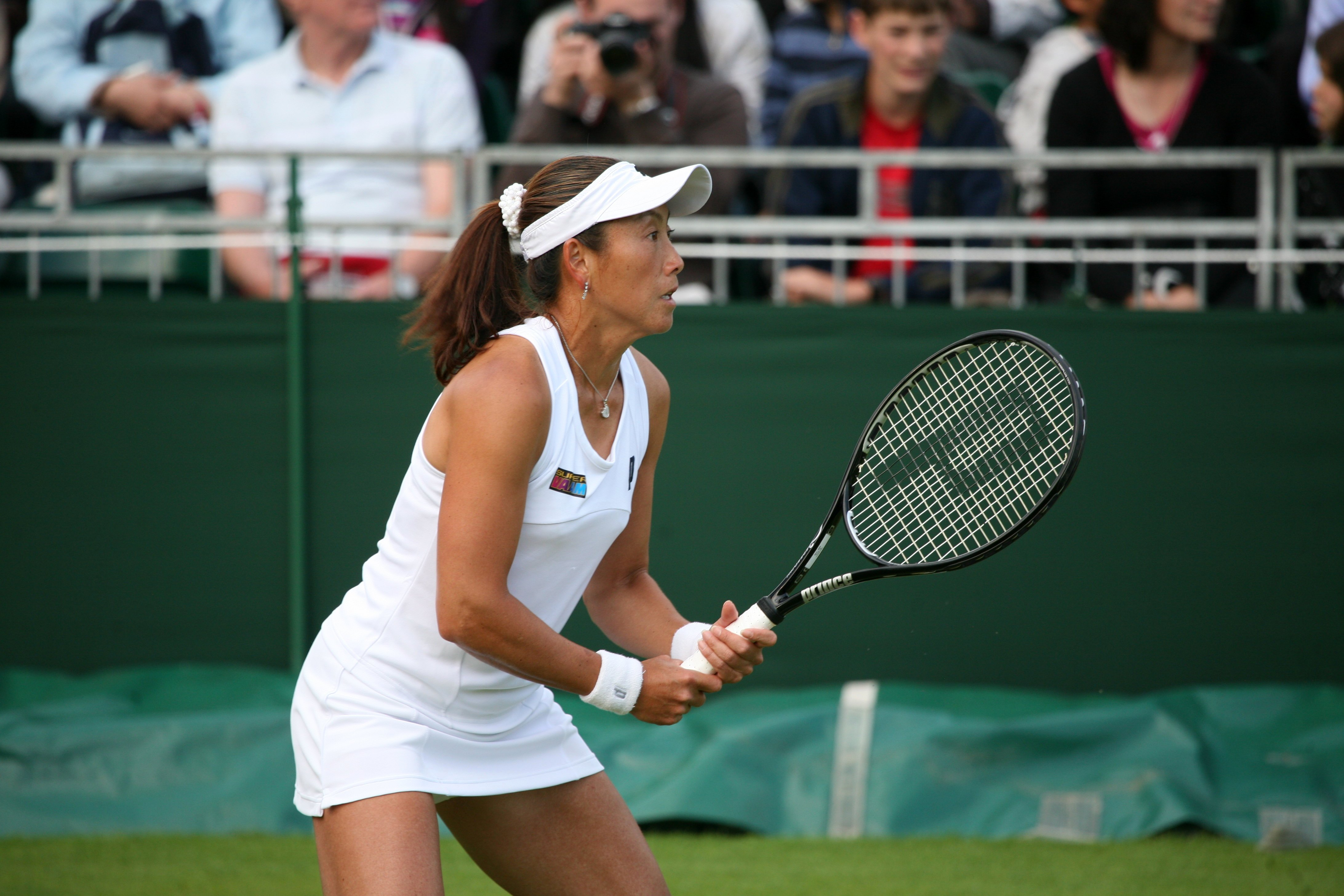
Ai Sugiyama competed in five women's doubles finals between 2000 and 2007.

Year	Champions	Runners-up	Score
1913	(United Kingdom) Dora Boothby (United Kingdom) Winifred McNair	(United Kingdom) Dorothea Lambert Chambers (United Kingdom) Charlotte Sterry	4–6, 2–4 retired
1914	(United Kingdom) Agnes Morton (United States) Elizabeth Ryan	(United Kingdom) Edith Hannam (United Kingdom) Ethel Larcombe	6–1, 6–3
1915	No competition (due to World War I)		
1916	No competition (due to World War I)		
1917	No competition (due to World War I)		
1918	No competition (due to World War I)		
1919	(France) Suzanne Lenglen (United States) Elizabeth Ryan	(United Kingdom) Dorothea Lambert Chambers (United Kingdom) Ethel Larcombe	4–6, 7–5, 6–3
1920	(France) Suzanne Lenglen (United States) Elizabeth Ryan	(United Kingdom) Dorothea Lambert Chambers (United Kingdom) Ethel Larcombe	6–4, 6–0
1921	(France) Suzanne Lenglen (United States) Elizabeth Ryan	(United Kingdom) Winifred Beamish (South Africa) Irene Peacock	6–1, 6–2
1922	(France) Suzanne Lenglen (United States) Elizabeth Ryan	(United Kingdom) Kitty McKane (United Kingdom) Margaret Stocks	6–0, 6–4
1923	(France) Suzanne Lenglen (United States) Elizabeth Ryan	(United Kingdom) Joan Austin (United Kingdom) Evelyn Colyer	6–3, 6–1
1924	(United States) Hazel Wightman (United States) Helen Wills	(United Kingdom) Phyllis Covell (United Kingdom) Kitty McKane	6–4, 6–4
1925	(France) Suzanne Lenglen (United States) Elizabeth Ryan	(United Kingdom) Kathleen Bridge (United Kingdom) Mary McIlquham	6–2, 6–2
1926	(United States) Mary Browne (United States) Elizabeth Ryan	(United Kingdom) Kitty Godfree (United Kingdom) Evelyn Colyer	6–1, 6–1
1927	(United States) Elizabeth Ryan (United States) Helen Wills	(South Africa) Bobbie Heine (South Africa) Irene Peacock	6–3, 6–2
1928	(United Kingdom) Peggy Saunders (United Kingdom) Phoebe Watson	(United Kingdom) Eileen Bennett (United Kingdom) Ermyntrude Harvey	6–2, 6–3
1929	(United Kingdom) Peggy Michell (United Kingdom) Phoebe Watson	(United Kingdom) Phyllis Covell (United Kingdom) Dorothy Shepherd-Barron	6–4, 8–6
1930	(United States) Helen Wills Moody (United States) Elizabeth Ryan	(United States) Edith Cross (United States) Sarah Palfrey	6–2, 9–7
1931	(United Kingdom) Dorothy Shepherd-Barron (United Kingdom) Phyllis Mudford	(France) Doris Metaxa (Belgium) Josane Sigart	3–6, 6–3, 6–4
1932	(France) Doris Metaxa (Belgium) Josane Sigart	(United States) Helen Jacobs (United States) Elizabeth Ryan	6–4, 6–3
1933	(France) Simonne Mathieu (United States) Elizabeth Ryan	(United Kingdom) Freda James (United Kingdom) Billie Yorke	6–2, 9–11, 6–4
1934	(France) Simonne Mathieu (United States) Elizabeth Ryan	(United States) Dorothy Andrus (France) Sylvie Henrotin	6–3, 6–3
1935	(United Kingdom) Freda James (United Kingdom) Kay Stammers	(France) Simonne Mathieu (Germany) Hilde Sperling	6–1, 6–4
1936	(United Kingdom) Freda James (United Kingdom) Kay Stammers	(United States) Sarah Fabyan (United States) Helen Jacobs	6–2, 6–1
1937	(France) Simonne Mathieu (United Kingdom) Billie Yorke	(United States) Phyllis King (United States) Elsie Pittman	6–3, 6–3
1938	(United States) Sarah Fabyan (United States) Alice Marble	(France) Simonne Mathieu (United Kingdom) Billie Yorke	6–2, 6–3
1939	(United States) Sarah Fabyan (United States) Alice Marble	(United States) Helen Jacobs (United Kingdom) Billie Yorke	6–1, 6–0
1940	No competition (due to World War II)		
1941	No competition (due to World War II)		
1942	No competition (due to World War II)		
1943	No competition (due to World War II)		
1944	No competition (due to World War II)		
1945	No competition (due to World War II)		
1946	(United States) Louise Brough (United States) Margaret Osborne	(United States) Pauline Betz (United States) Doris Hart	6–3, 2–6, 6–3
1947	(United States) Doris Hart (United States) Patricia Canning Todd	(United States) Louise Brough (United States) Margaret Osborne	3–6, 6–4, 7–5
1948	(United States) Louise Brough (United States) Margaret duPont	(United States) Doris Hart (United States) Patricia Todd	6–3, 3–6, 6–3
1949	(United States) Louise Brough (United States) Margaret duPont	(United States) Gussie Moran (United States) Patricia Todd	8–6, 7–5
1950	(United States) Louise Brough (United States) Margaret duPont	(United States) Shirley Fry (United States) Doris Hart	6–4, 5–7, 6–1
1951	(United States) Shirley Fry (United States) Doris Hart	(United States) Louise Brough (United States) Margaret duPont	6–3, 13–11
1952	(United States) Shirley Fry (United States) Doris Hart	(United States) Louise Brough (United States) Maureen Connolly	8–6, 6–3
1953	(United States) Shirley Fry (United States) Doris Hart	(United States) Maureen Connolly (United States) Julie Sampson	6–0, 6–0
1954	(United States) Louise Brough (United States) Margaret duPont	(United States) Shirley Fry (United States) Doris Hart	4–6, 9–7, 6–3
1955	(United Kingdom) Angela Mortimer (United Kingdom) Anne Shilcock	(United Kingdom) Shirley Bloomer (United Kingdom) Patricia Ward	7–5, 6–1
1956	(United Kingdom) Angela Buxton (United States) Althea Gibson	(Australia) Fay Muller (Australia) Daphne Seeney	6–1, 8–6
1957	(United States) Althea Gibson (United States) Darlene Hard	(Australia) Mary Hawton (Australia) Thelma Long	6–1, 6–2
1958	(Brazil) Maria Bueno (United States) Althea Gibson	(United States) Margaret duPont (United States) Margaret Varner	6–3, 7–5
1959	(United States) Jeanne Arth (United States) Darlene Hard	(United States) Beverly Fleitz (United Kingdom) Christine Truman	2–6, 6–2, 6–3
1960	(Brazil) Maria Bueno (United States) Darlene Hard	(South Africa) Sandra Reynolds (South Africa) Renée Schuurman	6–4, 6–0
1961	(United States) Karen Hantze (United States) Billie Jean Moffitt	(Australia) Jan Lehane (Australia) Margaret Smith	6–3, 6–4
1962	(United States) Karen Hantze (United States) Billie Jean Moffitt	(South Africa) Sandra Reynolds (South Africa) Renée Schuurman	5–7, 6–3, 7–5
1963	(Brazil) Maria Bueno (United States) Darlene Hard	(Australia) Robyn Ebbern (Australia) Margaret Smith	8–6, 9–7
1964	(Australia) Margaret Smith (Australia) Lesley Turner Bowrey	(United States) Billie Jean Moffitt (United States) Karen Susman	7–5, 6–2
1965	(Brazil) Maria Bueno (United States) Billie Jean Moffitt	(France) Françoise Dürr (France) Janine Lieffrig	6–2, 7–5
1966	(Brazil) Maria Bueno (United States) Nancy Richey	(Australia) Margaret Smith (Australia) Judy Tegart	6–3, 4–6, 6–4
1967	(United States) Rosemary Casals (United States) Billie Jean King	(Brazil) Maria Bueno (United States) Nancy Richey	9–11, 6–4, 6–2

=== Open Era ===
Year	Champions	Runners-up	Score
1968	(United States) Rosemary Casals (United States) Billie Jean King	(France) Françoise Dürr (United Kingdom) Ann Jones	3–6, 6–4, 7–5
1969	(Australia) Margaret Court (Australia) Judy Tegart	(United States) Patti Hogan (United States) Peggy Michel	9–7, 6–2
1970	(United States) Rosemary Casals (United States) Billie Jean King	(France) Françoise Dürr (United Kingdom) Virginia Wade	6–2, 6–3
1971	(United States) Rosemary Casals (United States) Billie Jean King	(Australia) Margaret Court (Australia) Evonne Goolagong	6–3, 6–2
1972	(United States) Billie Jean King (Netherlands) Betty Stöve	(Australia) Judy Dalton (France) Françoise Dürr	6–2, 4–6, 6–3
1973	(United States) Rosemary Casals (United States) Billie Jean King	(France) Françoise Dürr (Netherlands) Betty Stöve	6–1, 4–6, 7–5
1974	(Australia) Evonne Goolagong (United States) Peggy Michel	(Australia) Helen Gourlay (Australia) Karen Krantzcke	2–6, 6–4, 6–3
1975	(United States) Ann Kiyomura (Japan) Kazuko Sawamatsu	(France) Françoise Dürr (Netherlands) Betty Stöve	7–5, 1–6, 7–5
1976	(United States) Chris Evert (United States) Martina Navrátilová	(United States) Billie Jean King (Netherlands) Betty Stöve	6–1, 3–6, 7–5
1977	(Australia) Helen Gourlay (United States) JoAnne Russell	(United States) Martina Navratilova (Netherlands) Betty Stöve	6–3, 6–3
1978	(Australia) Kerry Reid (Australia) Wendy Turnbull	(Socialist Federal Republic of Yugoslavia) Mima Jaušovec (Romania) Virginia Ruzici	4–6, 9–8^{(12–10)}, 6–3
1979	(United States) Billie Jean King (United States) Martina Navratilova	(Netherlands) Betty Stöve (Australia) Wendy Turnbull	5–7, 6–3, 6–2
1980	(United States) Kathy Jordan (United States) Anne Smith	(United States) Rosemary Casals (Australia) Wendy Turnbull	4–6, 7–5, 6–1
1981	(United States) Martina Navratilova (United States) Pam Shriver	(United States) Kathy Jordan (United States) Anne Smith	6–3, 7–6^{(8–6)}
1982	(United States) Martina Navratilova (United States) Pam Shriver	(United States) Kathy Jordan (United States) Anne Smith	6–4, 6–1
1983	(United States) Martina Navratilova (United States) Pam Shriver	(United States) Rosemary Casals (Australia) Wendy Turnbull	6–2, 6–2
1984	(United States) Martina Navratilova (United States) Pam Shriver	(United States) Kathy Jordan (United States) Anne Smith	6–3, 6–4
1985	(United States) Kathy Jordan (Australia) Elizabeth Smylie	(United States) Martina Navratilova (United States) Pam Shriver	5–7, 6–3, 6–4
1986	(United States) Martina Navratilova (United States) Pam Shriver	(Czechoslovakia) Hana Mandlíková (Australia) Wendy Turnbull	6–1, 6–3
1987	(West Germany) Claudia Kohde-Kilsch (Czechoslovakia) Helena Suková	(United States) Betsy Nagelsen (Australia) Elizabeth Smylie	7–5, 7–5
1988	(West Germany) Steffi Graf (Argentina) Gabriela Sabatini	(Soviet Union) Larisa Savchenko (Soviet Union) Natasha Zvereva	6–3, 1–6, 12–10
1989	(Czechoslovakia) Jana Novotná (Czechoslovakia) Helena Suková	(Soviet Union) Larisa Savchenko (Soviet Union) Natasha Zvereva	6–1, 6–2
1990	(Czechoslovakia) Jana Novotná (Czechoslovakia) Helena Suková	(United States) Kathy Jordan (Australia) Elizabeth Smylie	6–3, 6–4
1991	(Soviet Union) Larisa Savchenko Neiland (Soviet Union) Natasha Zvereva	(Puerto Rico) Gigi Fernández (Czechoslovakia) Jana Novotná	6–4, 3–6, 6–4
1992	(United States) Gigi Fernández (Commonwealth of Independent States) Natasha Zvereva	(Latvia) Larisa Savchenko Neiland (Czechoslovakia) Jana Novotná	6–4, 6–1
1993	(United States) Gigi Fernández (Belarus) Natasha Zvereva	(Latvia) Larisa Savchenko Neiland (Czech Republic) Jana Novotná	6–4, 6–7^{(4–7)}, 6–4
1994	(United States) Gigi Fernández (Belarus) Natasha Zvereva	(Czech Republic) Jana Novotná (Spain) Arantxa Sánchez Vicario	6–4, 6–1
1995	(Czech Republic) Jana Novotná (Spain) Arantxa Sánchez Vicario	(United States) Gigi Fernández (Belarus) Natasha Zvereva	5–7, 7–5, 6–4
1996	(Switzerland) Martina Hingis (Czech Republic) Helena Suková	(United States) Meredith McGrath (Latvia) Larisa Savchenko Neiland	5–7, 7–5, 6–1
1997	(United States) Gigi Fernández (Belarus) Natasha Zvereva	(United States) Nicole Arendt (Netherlands) Manon Bollegraf	7–6^{(7–4)}, 6–4
1998	(Switzerland) Martina Hingis (Czech Republic) Jana Novotná	(United States) Lindsay Davenport (Belarus) Natasha Zvereva	6–3, 3–6, 8–6
1999	(United States) Lindsay Davenport (United States) Corina Morariu	(South Africa) Mariaan de Swardt (Ukraine) Elena Tatarkova	6–4, 6–4
2000	(United States) Serena Williams (United States) Venus Williams	(France) Julie Halard-Decugis (Japan) Ai Sugiyama	6–3, 6–2
2001	(United States) Lisa Raymond (Australia) Rennae Stubbs	(Belgium) Kim Clijsters (Japan) Ai Sugiyama	6–4, 6–3
2002	(United States) Serena Williams (United States) Venus Williams	(Spain) Virginia Ruano Pascual (Argentina) Paola Suárez	6–2, 7–5
2003	(Belgium) Kim Clijsters (Japan) Ai Sugiyama	(Spain) Virginia Ruano Pascual (Argentina) Paola Suárez	6–4, 6–4
2004	(Zimbabwe) Cara Black (Australia) Rennae Stubbs	(South Africa) Liezel Huber (Japan) Ai Sugiyama	6–3, 7–6^{(7–5)}
2005	(Zimbabwe) Cara Black (South Africa) Liezel Huber	(Russia) Svetlana Kuznetsova (France) Amélie Mauresmo	6–2, 6–1
2006	(China) Yan Zi (China) Zheng Jie	(Spain) Virginia Ruano Pascual (Argentina) Paola Suárez	6–3, 3–6, 6–2
2007	(Zimbabwe) Cara Black (South Africa) Liezel Huber	(Slovenia) Katarina Srebotnik (Japan) Ai Sugiyama	3–6, 6–3, 6–2
2008	(United States) Serena Williams (United States) Venus Williams	(United States) Lisa Raymond (Australia) Samantha Stosur	6–2, 6–2
2009	(United States) Serena Williams (United States) Venus Williams	(Australia) Samantha Stosur (Australia) Rennae Stubbs	7–6^{(7–4)}, 6–4
2010	(United States) Vania King (Kazakhstan) Yaroslava Shvedova	(Russia) Elena Vesnina (Russia) Vera Zvonareva	7–6^{(8–6)}, 6–2
2011	(Czech Republic) Květa Peschke (Slovenia) Katarina Srebotnik	(Germany) Sabine Lisicki (Australia) Samantha Stosur	6–3, 6–1
2012	(United States) Serena Williams (United States) Venus Williams	(Czech Republic) Andrea Hlaváčková (Czech Republic) Lucie Hradecká	7–5, 6–4
2013	(Chinese Taipei) Hsieh Su-wei (China) Peng Shuai	(Australia) Ashleigh Barty (Australia) Casey Dellacqua	7–6^{(7–1)}, 6–1
2014	(Italy) Sara Errani (Italy) Roberta Vinci	(Hungary) Tímea Babos (France) Kristina Mladenovic	6–1, 6–3
2015	(Switzerland) Martina Hingis (India) Sania Mirza	(Russia) Ekaterina Makarova (Russia) Elena Vesnina	5–7, 7–6^{(7–4)}, 7–5
2016	(United States) Serena Williams (United States) Venus Williams	(Hungary) Tímea Babos (Kazakhstan) Yaroslava Shvedova	6–3, 6–4
2017	(Russia) Ekaterina Makarova (Russia) Elena Vesnina	(Chinese Taipei) Chan Hao-ching (Romania) Monica Niculescu	6–0, 6–0
2018	(Czech Republic) Barbora Krejčíková (Czech Republic) Kateřina Siniaková	(United States) Nicole Melichar (Czech Republic) Květa Peschke	6–4, 4–6, 6–0
2019	(Chinese Taipei) Hsieh Su-wei (Czech Republic) Barbora Strýcová	(Canada) Gabriela Dabrowski (China) Xu Yifan	6–2, 6–4
2020	No competition (due to COVID-19 pandemic)		
2021	(Chinese Taipei) Hsieh Su-wei (Belgium) Elise Mertens	(Russia) Veronika Kudermetova (Russia) Elena Vesnina	3–6, 7–5, 9–7
2022	(Czech Republic) Barbora Krejčíková (Czech Republic) Kateřina Siniaková	(Belgium) Elise Mertens (China) Zhang Shuai	6–2, 6–4
2023	(Chinese Taipei) Hsieh Su-wei (Czech Republic) Barbora Strýcová	(Belgium) Elise Mertens (Australia) Storm Hunter	7–5, 6–4
2024	(Czech Republic) Kateřina Siniaková (United States) Taylor Townsend	(Canada) Gabriela Dabrowski (New Zealand) Erin Routliffe	7–6^{(7–5)}, 7–6^{(7–1)}
2025	Veronika Kudermetova (Belgium) Elise Mertens	(Chinese Taipei) Hsieh Su-wei (Latvia) Jeļena Ostapenko	3–6, 6–2, 6–4
2026	(China) Guo Hanyu (France) Kristina Mladenovic	(Canada) Gabriela Dabrowski (Brazil) Luisa Stefani	6–3, 7–5

== See also ==
Wimbledon other competitions

- List of Wimbledon gentlemen's singles champions
- List of Wimbledon gentlemen's doubles champions
- List of Wimbledon ladies' singles champions
- List of Wimbledon mixed doubles champions

Grand Slam women's doubles

- List of Australian Open women's doubles champions
- List of French Open women's doubles champions
- List of US Open women's doubles champions
- List of Grand Slam women's doubles champions
