= 1930 Wimbledon Championships – Men's doubles =

Men's doubles
- 1930 Wimbledon Championships

Final
- Champions: (United States) Wilmer Allison (United States) John Van Ryn
- Runners-up: (United States) John Doeg (United States) George Lott
- Score: 6–3, 6–3, 6–2

Details
- Draw: 64 (5Q)
- Seeds: 4

Events
Singles	men	women		boys	girls
Doubles	men	women	mixed	boys	girls
- Wimbledon Championships

Wilmer Allison and John Van Ryn successfully defended their title, defeating John Doeg and George Lott in the final, 6–3, 6–3, 6–2 to win the gentlemen's doubles tennis title at the 1930 Wimbledon Championship.

== Seeds ==
1. (United States) John Doeg / (United States) George Lott (final)
2. (United States) Wilmer Allison / (United States) John Van Ryn (champions)
3. (France) Jacques Brugnon / (France) Henri Cochet (semifinals)
4. (United Kingdom) Ian Collins / (United Kingdom) Colin Gregory (semifinals)

Click on the seed number of a player to go to their draw section.

== Draw ==
Key

- Q = Qualifier
- WC = Wild card
- LL = Lucky loser
- Alt = Alternate
- ITF = ITF entry
- PR = Protected ranking
- SR = Special ranking
- SE = Special exempt
- JE = Junior exempt
- JR = Junior Accelerator Programme entrant
- CO = College Accelerator Programme entrant
- NG = Next Gen Accelerator Program entrant
- w/o = Walkover
- r = Retired
- d = Defaulted

=== Finals ===
Quarterfinals
1	(United States) John Doeg (United States) George Lott	6	6	4	6	8
(Australia) Harry Hopman (Australia) James Willard	4	2	6	8	6
3	(France) Jacques Brugnon (France) Henri Cochet	6	4	6	6
(United States) Bill Tilden (Netherlands) Hendrik Timmer	2	6	3	3
2	(United States) Wilmer Allison (United States) John Van Ryn	6	5	7	7
(United Kingdom) Bunny Austin (United Kingdom) John Olliff	2	7	5	5
4	(United Kingdom) Ian Collins (United Kingdom) Colin Gregory	9	6	6
(France) Jean Borotra (France) Christian Boussus	7	3	2

Semifinals
1	(United States) John Doeg (United States) George Lott	8	3	6	6
3	(France) Jacques Brugnon (France) Henri Cochet	6	6	3	1
2	(United States) Wilmer Allison (United States) John Van Ryn	4	7	6	6
4	(United Kingdom) Ian Collins (United Kingdom) Colin Gregory	6	5	3	3

Final
1	(United States) John Doeg (United States) George Lott	3	3	2
2	(United States) Wilmer Allison (United States) John Van Ryn	6	6	6

=== Top half ===
==== Section 1 ====
First round
1	(United States) John Doeg (United States) George Lott	8	13	7
(United Kingdom) Victor Cazalet (United Kingdom) John Cecil Masterman	6	11	5
(United Kingdom) Leighton Crawford (United Kingdom) Geoffrey de Ste. Croix	6	6	6	6
(Monaco) Vladimir Landau (Romania) Nicolae Mișu	8	4	2	4
(New Zealand) Buster Andrews (United Kingdom) Charles Kingsley	2	4	4
(United Kingdom) Pat Hughes (United Kingdom) Harry Lee	6	6	6
(New Zealand) Cam Malfroy (United Kingdom) Roy Poland	6	6	6
(United Kingdom) Kenneth Gandar-Dower (United Kingdom) Dickie Ritchie	2	2	4
(Netherlands) Jan van der Heide (Germany) Fritz Kuhlmann	6	1	6	1	3
Q	(United Kingdom) Herman David (United Kingdom) Ken Horne	1	6	2	6	6
(United Kingdom) Jack Chamberlain (United Kingdom) Jack Harrison	3	1	8	6	3
(Japan) Ryuki Miki (Japan) Hyotaro Sato	6	6	6	2	6
(India) Harish Dhanda (India) Atri-Madan Mohan	4	6	7	6
Q	(Argentina) Carlos Magrane; BO Porter	6	3	5	1
(Australia) Harry Hopman (Australia) James Willard	6	6	6
(United Kingdom) Brian Gilbert (United Kingdom) Noel Turnbull	1	4	4

Second round
1	(United States) J Doeg (United States) G Lott	6	4	6	5	6
(United Kingdom) FRL Crawford (United Kingdom) G de Ste. Croix	0	6	4	7	3
(United Kingdom) P Hughes (United Kingdom) H Lee	5	1	4
(New Zealand) C Malfroy (United Kingdom) R Poland	7	6	6
Q	(United Kingdom) H David (United Kingdom) K Horne	3	3	3
(Japan) T Miki (Japan) H Sato	6	6	6
(India) H Dhanda (India) AM Mohan	2	2	1
(Australia) H Hopman (Australia) J Willard	6	6	6

Third round
1	(United States) J Doeg (United States) G Lott	7	2	14	6
(New Zealand) C Malfroy (United Kingdom) R Poland	5	6	12	3
(Japan) T Miki (Japan) H Sato	2	2	2
(Australia) H Hopman (Australia) J Willard	6	6	6

Quarterfinals
1	(United States) J Doeg (United States) G Lott	6	6	4	6	8
(Australia) H Hopman (Australia) J Willard	4	2	6	8	6

The nationality of BO Porter is unknown.

==== Section 2 ====
First round
3	(France) Jacques Brugnon (France) Henri Cochet	7	5	6	6
(United Kingdom) JH Frowen (United Kingdom) Donald Greig	5	7	1	4
Q	(United Kingdom) GA Barber (United Kingdom) CH Watson	6	6	7
Q	(United Kingdom) Jack Antrobus (United Kingdom) Orson Wright	2	4	5
(Republic of Ireland) George Lyttleton-Rogers (South Africa) Pat Spence
(Austria) Hermann Artens (Austria) Franz Matejka	w/o
(United Kingdom) William Powell (United Kingdom) Laddie Wheatcroft	4	6	6	3
(Germany) Heinrich Kleinschroth (Germany) Daniel Prenn	6	3	8	6
(United States) Berkeley Bell (United States) Gregory Mangin	7	6	6
(United Kingdom) Vincent Burr (Austria) Ludwig von Salm-Hoogstraeten	5	4	4
(United Kingdom) Keats Lester (United Kingdom) Eric Peters	6	6	6
(United Kingdom) Edward Buzzard (United States) Edward Mather	1	4	4
(United States) Bill Tilden (Netherlands) Hendrik Timmer	6	8	6
Q	(United Kingdom) Ronald Deterding (United Kingdom) Jimmy Reddall	4	6	2
(Egypt) Jacques Grandguillot (France) Pierre Henri Landry	7	6	6	7
(Belgium) Léopold de Borman (Czechoslovakia) Josef Maleček	9	0	4	5

Second round
3	(France) J Brugnon (France) H Cochet	7	6	6
Q	(United Kingdom) GA Barber (United Kingdom) CH Watson	5	1	3
(Republic of Ireland) G Lyttleton-Rogers (South Africa) P Spence	4	4	11	6	2
(Germany) H Kleinschroth (Germany) D Prenn	6	6	9	3	6
(United States) B Bell (United States) G Mangin	3	6	6	11
(United Kingdom) K Lester (United Kingdom) E Peters	6	4	2	9
(United States) W Tilden (Netherlands) H Timmer	8	4	4	6	6
(Egypt) J Grandguillot (France) PH Landry	6	6	6	1	4

Third round
3	(France) J Brugnon (France) H Cochet	9	7	6
(Germany) H Kleinschroth (Germany) D Prenn	7	5	1
(United States) B Bell (United States) G Mangin	5	6	2
(United States) W Tilden (Netherlands) H Timmer	7	8	6

Quarterfinals
3	(France) J Brugnon (France) H Cochet	6	4	6	6
(United States) W Tilden (Netherlands) H Timmer	2	6	3	3

=== Bottom half ===
==== Section 3 ====
First round
2	(United States) Wilmer Allison (United States) John Van Ryn	6	6	6
(United Kingdom) Claude Metcalf (United Kingdom) Arthur Vinall	2	3	0
(France) Georges Glasser (United Kingdom) Alfred Ingram	4	5	6
(Japan) Tamio Abe (Japan) Takeichi Harada	6	7	8
(United Kingdom) Leslie Hill (Belgium) André Lacroix	6	6	3	1	4
(United Kingdom) Sidney Hepburn (United Kingdom) Tim Horn	4	1	6	6	6
(United Kingdom) Teddy Higgs (Japan) Yoshiro Ohta	6	6	6
(Argentina) Jorge Williams (Argentina) Llewellyn Williams	1	1	2
(United Kingdom) Gordon Crole-Rees (United Kingdom) Cyril Eames	6	4	6	6
(United Kingdom) Billy Collins (United Kingdom) FR Scovel	2	6	4	3
(United Kingdom) Fred Perry (United Kingdom) Frank Wilde	3	1	5
(United Kingdom) Bunny Austin (United Kingdom) John Olliff	6	6	7
(United Kingdom) Jack Hillyard (Hungary) Béla von Kehrling	0	6	6	6
(France) Emmanuel du Plaix (France) Raymond Rodel	6	2	4	2
(United Kingdom) Brian Helmore (United Kingdom) Norman Latchford	7	1	1
(United Kingdom) Alan Brown (United Kingdom) Lewis Michell	9	6	6

Second round
2	(United States) W Allison (United States) J Van Ryn	6	6	6
(Japan) T Abe (Japan) T Harada	3	4	4
(United Kingdom) S Hepburn (United Kingdom) T Horn	5	6	8	6
(United Kingdom) E Higgs (Japan) Y Ohta	7	1	6	2
(United Kingdom) G Crole-Rees (United Kingdom) C Eames	1	5	4
(United Kingdom) H Austin (United Kingdom) J Olliff	6	7	6
(United Kingdom) J Hillyard (Hungary) B von Kehrling	6	1	6	3	6
(United Kingdom) A Brown (United Kingdom) L Michell	4	6	3	6	3

Third round
2	(United States) W Allison (United States) J Van Ryn	6	6	6
(United Kingdom) S Hepburn (United Kingdom) T Horn	4	4	2
(United Kingdom) H Austin (United Kingdom) J Olliff	8	6	6
(United Kingdom) J Hillyard (Hungary) B von Kehrling	6	0	2

Quarterfinals
2	(United States) W Allison (United States) J Van Ryn	6	5	7	7
(United Kingdom) H Austin (United Kingdom) J Olliff	2	7	5	5

==== Section 4 ====
First round
4	(United Kingdom) Ian Collins (United Kingdom) Colin Gregory	6	6	6
(United Kingdom) Gwyn Tuckett (United Kingdom) David Williams	3	3	1
(South Africa) Julien Lezard (India) Donald Rutnam	2	3	3
(Czechoslovakia) Jan Koželuh (Czechoslovakia) Roderich Menzel	6	6	6
(India) Athar-Ali Fyzee (India) Hassan Ali Fyzee	0	3	4
(United Kingdom) Nigel Sharpe (United Kingdom) Patrick Wheatley	6	6	6
(United Kingdom) Leslie Godfree (South Africa) Gerald Sherwell	7	6	1	6
(Canada) WAH Duff (United Kingdom) DH Hazell	5	2	6	2
(India) Janmeja Charanjiva (India) Hira-Lal Soni	2	0	6	6	6
(United Kingdom) Ted Avory (United Kingdom) Colin Higgins	6	6	4	0	3
(Switzerland) Max Ellmer (Switzerland) Maurice Ferrier	3	2	0
(France) Jean Borotra (France) Christian Boussus	6	6	6
(United Kingdom) Philip Glover (United Kingdom) Harry Lewis-Barclay	3	2	4
(Australia) Jack Crawford (Australia) Gar Moon	6	6	6
(Italy) Placido Gaslini (Italy) Uberto de Morpurgo	7	6	6
(United Kingdom) Stan Harris (United States) Eugene McCauliff	5	0	2

Second round
4	(United Kingdom) I Collins (United Kingdom) C Gregory	6	6	6
(Czechoslovakia) J Koželuh (Czechoslovakia) R Menzel	3	3	4
(United Kingdom) N Sharpe (United Kingdom) P Wheatley	6	6	6
(United Kingdom) L Godfree (South Africa) G Sherwell	3	1	1
(India) J Charanjiva (India) H-L Soni	6	3	0	8	2
(France) J Borotra (France) C Boussus	4	6	6	6	6
(Australia) J Crawford (Australia) E Moon	9	5	4	7	6
(Italy) P Gaslini (Italy) H de Morpurgo	7	7	6	5	0

Third round
4	(United Kingdom) I Collins (United Kingdom) C Gregory	3	6	6	6	7
(United Kingdom) N Sharpe (United Kingdom) P Wheatley	6	0	8	2	5
(France) J Borotra (France) C Boussus	1	6	6	5	6
(Australia) J Crawford (Australia) E Moon	6	2	1	7	4

Quarterfinals
4	(United Kingdom) I Collins (United Kingdom) C Gregory	9	6	6
(France) J Borotra (France) C Boussus	7	3	2
