= 1930 Wimbledon Championships – Mixed doubles =

Mixed doubles
- 1930 Wimbledon Championships

Final
- Champions: (Australia) Jack Crawford (United States) Elizabeth Ryan
- Runners-up: (Germany) Daniel Prenn (Germany) Hilde Krahwinkel
- Score: 6–1, 6–3

Details
- Draw: 67 (5Q)
- Seeds: 4

Events
Singles	men	women		boys	girls
Doubles	men	women	mixed	boys	girls
- Wimbledon Championships

Frank Hunter and Helen Wills were the defending champions, but did not participate.

Jack Crawford and Elizabeth Ryan defeated Daniel Prenn and Hilde Krahwinkel in the final, 6–1, 6–3 to win the mixed doubles tennis title at the 1930 Wimbledon Championships.

== Seeds ==
1. (United States) Bill Tilden / (Germany) Cilly Aussem (quarterfinals)
2. (Australia) Jack Crawford / (United States) Elizabeth Ryan (champions)
3. (France) Henri Cochet / (United Kingdom) Eileen Fearnley-Whittingstall (semifinals)
4. (France) Jean Borotra / (Spain) Lilí de Álvarez (withdrew)

Click on the seed number of a player to go to their draw section.

== Draw ==
Key

- Q = Qualifier
- WC = Wild card
- LL = Lucky loser
- Alt = Alternate
- ITF = ITF entry
- PR = Protected ranking
- SR = Special ranking
- SE = Special exempt
- JE = Junior exempt
- JR = Junior Accelerator Programme entrant
- CO = College Accelerator Programme entrant
- NG = Next Gen Accelerator Program entrant
- w/o = Walkover
- r = Retired
- d = Defaulted

=== Finals ===
Quarterfinals
2	(Australia) Jack Crawford (United States) Elizabeth Ryan	6	3	6
(United States) Wilmer Allison (United States) Edith Cross	2	6	3
3	(France) Henri Cochet (United Kingdom) Eileen Fearnley-Whittingstall	7	9
(Australia) Harry Hopman (Belgium) Josane Sigart	5	7
1	(United States) Bill Tilden (Germany) Cilly Aussem	w/o
(United Kingdom) Gordon Crole-Rees (United Kingdom) Phyllis Mudford
(United Kingdom) Eric Peters (United Kingdom) Elsie Pittman	1	4
(Germany) Daniel Prenn (Germany) Hilde Krahwinkel	6	6

Semifinals
2	(Australia) Jack Crawford (United States) Elizabeth Ryan	6	7	6
3	(France) Henri Cochet (United Kingdom) Eileen Fearnley-Whittingstall	3	9	4
(United Kingdom) Gordon Crole-Rees (United Kingdom) Phyllis Mudford	6	3	3
(Germany) Daniel Prenn (Germany) Hilde Krahwinkel	4	6	6

Final
2	(Australia) Jack Crawford (United States) Elizabeth Ryan	6	6
(Germany) Daniel Prenn (Germany) Hilde Krahwinkel	1	3

=== Top half ===
==== Section 1 ====
First round

Second round
2	(Australia) Jack Crawford (United States) Elizabeth Ryan	6	6
(United Kingdom) Noel Turnbull (United Kingdom) Dorothy Hill	3	3
(Japan) Yoshiro Ohta (United Kingdom) Betty Dix
(United Kingdom) John Olliff (United Kingdom) Phoebe Watson	w/o
(United Kingdom) Billy Collins (United Kingdom) Gwen Sterry	2	3
(United States) Gregory Mangin (United States) Sarah Palfrey	6	6
(Egypt) Jacques Grandguillot (France) Simone Barbier	5	6	6
(United Kingdom) Edward Buzzard (United Kingdom) Nancy Lyle	7	3	3

Third round
2	(Australia) J Crawford (United States) E Ryan	6	6
(Japan) Y Ohta (United Kingdom) M Dix	3	4
(United States) G Mangin (United States) S Palfrey	6	6
(Egypt) J Grandguillot (France) S Barbier	3	3

Fourth round
2	(Australia) J Crawford (United States) E Ryan	6	6
(United States) G Mangin (United States) S Palfrey	2	4

==== Section 2 ====
First round

Second round
(New Zealand) Cam Malfroy (United Kingdom) Mrs HV Edwards	7	3	3
(Japan) Tamio Abe (United Kingdom) Agnes Tuckey	5	6	6
(United Kingdom) Cyril Eames (United Kingdom) Ermyntrude Harvey	w/o
(France) Pierre Henri Landry (France) Jacqueline Gallay
(United States) Wilmer Allison (United States) Edith Cross	3	6	6
(South Africa) Gerald Sherwell (United Kingdom) Vera Montgomery	6	4	2
Q	(United Kingdom) George Perkins (United Kingdom) Mrs WT Tucker	6	6
(United Kingdom) Ambrose Dudley (Denmark) Else Støckel	4	2

Third round
(Japan) T Abe (United Kingdom) A Tuckey	5	4
(France) PH Landry (France) J Gallay	7	6
(United States) W Allison (United States) E Cross	9	7
Q	(United Kingdom) G Perkins (United Kingdom) Mrs WT Tucker	7	5

Fourth round
(France) PH Landry (France) J Gallay	4	3
(United States) W Allison (United States) E Cross	6	6

==== Section 3 ====
First round

Second round
3	(France) Henri Cochet (United Kingdom) Eileen Fearnley-Whittingstall	2	6	6
(United Kingdom) Norman Latchford (United Kingdom) Madge List	6	4	1
(Japan) Takeichi Harada (France) Simonne Mathieu	4	1
(Netherlands) Hendrik Timmer (Netherlands) Mence Canters	6	6
(Hungary) Béla von Kehrling (Austria) Trudi Wolf	1	5
(United Kingdom) Ian Collins (United Kingdom) Joan Fry	6	7
(United Kingdom) Harry Lee (United Kingdom) Violet Owen	6	6
(Germany) Fritz Kuhlmann (Germany) Anne Peitz	4	2

Third round
3	(France) H Cochet (United Kingdom) E Fearnley-Whittingstall	6	6
(Netherlands) H Timmer (Netherlands) M Canters	0	0
(United Kingdom) I Collins (United Kingdom) J Fry	6	6
(United Kingdom) H Lee (United Kingdom) V Owen	0	3

Fourth round
3	(France) H Cochet (United Kingdom) E Fearnley-Whittingstall	6	6
(United Kingdom) I Collins (United Kingdom) J Fry	2	2

==== Section 4 ====
First round
(Australia) Gar Moon (Australia) Esna Robertson	6	8
Q	(United Kingdom) John Pennycuick (United Kingdom) Lucy Johnstone	1	6
(United Kingdom) Harry Lewis-Barclay (Australia) Kathleen Le Messurier	4	3
(United Kingdom) Patrick Wheatley (United Kingdom) Joan Lycett	6	6

Second round
(United States) Berkeley Bell (United States) Mary Greef	6	2	3
(Australia) James Willard (Switzerland) Lolette Payot	3	6	6
(Australia) Harry Hopman (Belgium) Josane Sigart	6	6	6
Q	(Canada) WAH Duff (United Kingdom) Joan Strawson	3	8	0
(United Kingdom) Philip Glover (India) Jenny Sandison	7	6	4
(Japan) Ryuki Miki (United Kingdom) MA Thomas	9	4	6
(Australia) E Moon (Australia) E Robertson	9	4	2
(United Kingdom) P Wheatley (United Kingdom) J Lycett	7	6	6

Third round
(Australia) J Willard (Switzerland) L Payot	3	8	0
(Australia) H Hopman (Belgium) J Sigart	6	6	6
(Japan) T Miki (United Kingdom) MA Thomas	6	6
(United Kingdom) P Wheatley (United Kingdom) J Lycett	4	3

Fourth round
(Australia) H Hopman (Belgium) J Sigart	6	6
(Japan) T Miki (United Kingdom) MA Thomas	4	4

=== Bottom half ===
==== Section 5 ====
First round
1	(United States) Bill Tilden (Germany) Cilly Aussem	6	6
(United Kingdom) Fred Perry (United Kingdom) Mary Heeley	1	4

Second round
1	(United States) W Tilden (Germany) C Aussem	6	6
(Netherlands) Jan van der Heide (Netherlands) Madzy Couquerque	4	4
(United Kingdom) Nigel Sharpe (United Kingdom) Effie Hemmant	6	4	3
(New Zealand) Buster Andrews (United Kingdom) Winifred Beamish	2	6	6
(Japan) Hyotaro Sato (United Kingdom) Madge Slaney	6	7	3
(United States) Edward Mather (United Kingdom) Elsa Haylock	1	9	6
(France) Jacques Brugnon (France) Sylvie Henrotin
(Switzerland) Hector Chiesa (United Kingdom) Evelyn Dearman	w/o

Third round
1	(United States) W Tilden (Germany) C Aussem
(New Zealand) E Andrews (United Kingdom) W Beamish	w/o
(United States) E Mather (United Kingdom) E Haylock	6	3
(France) J Brugnon (France) S Henrotin	8	6

Fourth round
1	(United States) W Tilden (Germany) C Aussem	6	9
(France) J Brugnon (France) S Henrotin	4	7

==== Section 6 ====
First round

Second round
(France) Raymond Rodel (France) Violette Gallay	2	3
(United Kingdom) Donald Greig (United Kingdom) Mary McIlquham	6	6
(United Kingdom) Gordon Crole-Rees (United Kingdom) Phyllis Mudford	3	6	6
(United Kingdom) Leslie Godfree (United Kingdom) Kitty Godfree	6	3	4
Q	(United Kingdom) Henry Burrows (United Kingdom) Dorothy Anderson	4	6	6
(United Kingdom) Brian Gilbert (United Kingdom) Margaret Stocks	6	4	8
(United Kingdom) Pat Hughes (United Kingdom) Dorothy Round	6	6
(Republic of Ireland) Henry Purcell (United Kingdom) Kathleen Bridge	3	1

Third round
(United Kingdom) D Greig (United Kingdom) M McIlquham	2	6	4
(United Kingdom) G Crole-Rees (United Kingdom) P Mudford	6	3	6
(United Kingdom) B Gilbert (United Kingdom) M Stocks	7	2	6
(United Kingdom) P Hughes (United Kingdom) D Round	5	6	2

Fourth round
(United Kingdom) G Crole-Rees (United Kingdom) P Mudford	6	6
(United Kingdom) B Gilbert (United Kingdom) M Stocks	3	3

==== Section 7 ====
First round

Second round
4	(France) Jean Borotra (Spain) Lilí de Álvarez	w/o
(United Kingdom) JH Frowen (United Kingdom) Enid Clarke
Q	(United Kingdom) Leslie Hill (United Kingdom) MK Phayre	4	4
(United Kingdom) Stan Harris (United Kingdom) Joan Ridley	6	6
(Belgium) Léopold de Borman (France) Aimée Charpenel	1	5
(United Kingdom) William Powell (United Kingdom) Naomi Trentham	6	7
(Belgium) André Lacroix (United Kingdom) Susan Noel	1	3
(United Kingdom) Eric Peters (United Kingdom) Elsie Pittman	6	6

Third round
(United Kingdom) JH Frowen (United Kingdom) E Clarke	7	6	2
(United Kingdom) S Harris (United Kingdom) J Ridley	9	3	6
(United Kingdom) W Powell (United Kingdom) N Trentham	4	3
(United Kingdom) E Peters (United Kingdom) E Pittman	6	6

Fourth round
(United Kingdom) S Harris (United Kingdom) J Ridley	4	3
(United Kingdom) E Peters (United Kingdom) E Pittman	6	6

==== Section 8 ====
First round

Second round
(Romania) Nicolae Mișu (United Kingdom) JL Colegate	13	3
(Germany) Daniel Prenn (Germany) Hilde Krahwinkel	15	6
(Monaco) Vladimir Landau (United Kingdom) Sybil Johnson
(United States) John Doeg (United States) Mianne Palfrey	w/o
(South Africa) Pat Spence (United Kingdom) Betty Nuthall	1	7	6
(United States) George Lott (United States) Helen Jacobs	6	5	2
(United Kingdom) Jack Hillyard (Denmark) Else Dam	9	2
(United Kingdom) D Ingram (United Kingdom) Peggy Pleydell-Bouverie	11	6

Third round
(Germany) D Prenn (Germany) H Krahwinkel	6	6
(Monaco) V Landau (United Kingdom) S Johnson	3	1
(South Africa) P Spence (United Kingdom) B Nuthall	4	4
(United Kingdom) D Ingram (United Kingdom) M Pleydell-Bouverie	6	6

Fourth round
(Germany) D Prenn (Germany) H Krahwinkel	6	6
(United Kingdom) D Ingram (United Kingdom) M Pleydell-Bouverie	1	2
