= 1930 Wimbledon Championships – Men's singles =

Men's singles
- 1930 Wimbledon Championships

Final
- Champion: (United States) Bill Tilden
- Runner-up: (United States) Wilmer Allison
- Score: 6–3, 9–7, 6–4

Details
- Draw: 128 (10Q)
- Seeds: 8

Events
Singles	men	women		boys	girls
Doubles	men	women	mixed	boys	girls
- Wimbledon Championships

Bill Tilden defeated Wilmer Allison in the final, 6–3, 9–7, 6–4 to win the gentlemen's singles tennis title at the 1930 Wimbledon Championships. It was his third Wimbledon title and his tenth and last major singles title overall. Tilden was the last singles player born in the 1800s to win Wimbledon. Henri Cochet was the defending champion, but lost in the quarterfinals to Allison.

== Seeds ==
1. (France) Henri Cochet (quarterfinals)
2. (United States) Bill Tilden (champion)
3. (France) Jean Borotra (semifinals)
4. (United States) John Doeg (semifinals)
5. (United States) George Lott (quarterfinals)
6. (United Kingdom) Bunny Austin (fourth round)
7. (Italy) Uberto de Morpurgo (third round)
8. (Australia) Gar Moon (first round)

Click on the seed number of a player to go to their draw section.

== Draw ==
Key

- Q = Qualifier
- WC = Wild card
- LL = Lucky loser
- Alt = Alternate
- ITF = ITF entry
- PR = Protected ranking
- SR = Special ranking
- SE = Special exempt
- JE = Junior exempt
- JR = Junior Accelerator Programme entrant
- CO = College Accelerator Programme entrant
- NG = Next Gen Accelerator Program entrant
- w/o = Walkover
- r = Retired
- d = Defaulted

=== Finals ===
Quarterfinals
1	(France) Henri Cochet	4	4	3
(United States) Wilmer Allison	6	6	6
4	(United States) John Doeg	6	1	6	6
(United States) Gregory Mangin	3	6	3	4
2	(United States) Bill Tilden	6	6	6
(United Kingdom) Colin Gregory	1	2	3
3	(France) Jean Borotra	2	6	6	6
5	(United States) George Lott	6	3	3	4

Semifinals
(United States) Wilmer Allison	6	4	8	3	7
4	(United States) John Doeg	3	6	6	6	5
2	(United States) Bill Tilden	0	6	4	6	7
3	(France) Jean Borotra	6	4	6	0	5

Final
(United States) Wilmer Allison	3	7	4
2	(United States) Bill Tilden	6	9	6

=== Top half ===
==== Section 1 ====
First round
1	(France) Henri Cochet	6	9	4	6	6
(Netherlands) Hendrik Timmer	4	11	6	4	2
(Italy) Placido Gaslini	3	1	1
(New Zealand) Cam Malfroy	6	6	6
Q	(United Kingdom) Jimmy Reddall	6	3	1	2
(Czechoslovakia) Roderich Menzel	3	6	6	6
(United Kingdom) Arthur Vinall	7	4	3	1
(United States) Berkeley Bell	5	6	6	6
(United States) Eugene McCauliff	2	5	6	4
(United Kingdom) Keats Lester	6	7	0	6
(United Kingdom) Roy Poland	6	6	6
(Belgium) Léopold de Borman	4	3	4
(India) Hassan Ali Fyzee	4	6	4	2
(United Kingdom) Jimmy Nuthall	6	1	6	6
(United Kingdom) John Shales	4	5	6	6	0
(United Kingdom) Brian Gilbert	6	7	2	2	6

Second round
1	(France) H Cochet	6	6	6
(New Zealand) C Malfroy	4	1	1
(Czechoslovakia) R Menzel	1	2	2
(United States) B Bell	6	6	6
(United Kingdom) K Lester	6	6	7
(United Kingdom) R Poland	1	2	5
(United Kingdom) J Nuthall	1	2	1
(United Kingdom) B Gilbert	6	6	6

Third round
1	(France) H Cochet	6	6	5	4	6
(United States) B Bell	2	2	7	6	1
(United Kingdom) K Lester	6	6	3	8
(United Kingdom) B Gilbert	1	3	6	6

Fourth round
1	(France) H Cochet	6	4	6	6
(United Kingdom) K Lester	3	6	2	1

==== Section 2 ====
First round
8	(Australia) Gar Moon	1	3	3
(United States) Wilmer Allison	6	6	6
(Romania) Nicolae Mișu	3	4	4
(United Kingdom) Stan Harris	6	6	6
Q	(United Kingdom) Arthur Smith	1	6	6	6
(United Kingdom) Eric Peters	6	2	1	1
(Japan) Hyotaro Sato	6	2	3	4
(Republic of Ireland) George Lyttleton-Rogers	1	6	6	6
Q	(United Kingdom) George Perkins	4	6	6	6
(France) Alain Gerbault	6	2	4	0
(United Kingdom) Oswald Jameson	7	0	1
(Germany) Daniel Prenn	9	6	6
(United Kingdom) Laddie Wheatcroft	6	6	6	6
(United Kingdom) Henry Hunter	2	8	2	2
(United Kingdom) Patrick Wheatley	2	2	6	4
(United Kingdom) Pat Hughes	6	6	4	6

Second round
(United States) W Allison	6	8	6
(United Kingdom) S Harris	3	6	4
(United Kingdom) E Peters	6	0	5	4
(Republic of Ireland) G Lyttleton-Rogers	1	6	7	6
Q	(United Kingdom) G Perkins	3	3	3
(Germany) D Prenn	6	6	6
(United Kingdom) I Wheatcroft	1	2	2
(United Kingdom) P Hughes	6	6	6

Third round
(United States) W Allison	6	6	6
(Republic of Ireland) G Lyttleton-Rogers	3	3	2
(Germany) D Prenn	7	4	1	3
(United Kingdom) P Hughes	5	6	6	6

Fourth round
(United States) W Allison	4	6	6	6
(United Kingdom) P Hughes	6	1	2	3

==== Section 3 ====
First round
4	(United States) John Doeg	6	6	4	4	6
(United Kingdom) Nigel Sharpe	3	1	6	6	1
Q	(United Kingdom) Freddie Della Porta	6	6	6
(Switzerland) Maurice Ferrier	2	4	0
Q	(United Kingdom) Claude Metcalf	3	6	8	2
Q	(United Kingdom) Edward Flury	6	4	10	6
(France) Christian Boussus	6	6	6
(Switzerland) Max Ellmer	2	2	4
(United Kingdom) Dickie Ritchie	6	6	7
(India) Atri Madan Mohan	1	0	5
(Czechoslovakia) Josef Maleček	6	6	8
(Australia) Jack Crawford	0	3	6
(Germany) Heinrich Kleinschroth	6	2	6	7
(United Kingdom) Jack Harrison	2	6	2	5
(United Kingdom) Herman David	3	9	6	6
(Jamaica) Bertrand Clark	6	7	2	4

Second round
4	(United States) J Doeg	6	6	6
Q	(United Kingdom) A Della Porta	3	1	2
Q	(United Kingdom) E Flury	2	1	6
(France) C Boussus	6	6	8
(India) AM Mohan	2	6	3	2
(Australia) J Crawford	6	3	6	6
(Germany) H Kleinschroth	1	3	3
(United Kingdom) H David	6	6	6

Third round
4	(United States) J Doeg	5	6	12	6	6
(France) C Boussus	7	1	14	0	2
(Australia) J Crawford	2	3	6	4
(United Kingdom) H David	6	6	3	6

Fourth round
4	(United States) J Doeg	6	6	6
(United Kingdom) H David	3	3	1

==== Section 4 ====
First round
6	(United Kingdom) Bunny Austin	2	7	6	6
(United Kingdom) Ted Avory	6	5	3	0
(Argentina) Llewellyn Williams	1	1	4
(Egypt) Jacques Grandguillot	6	6	6
(South Africa) Gerald Sherwell	3	0	3
(France) Pierre Henri Landry	6	6	6
(France) Georges Glasser	6	4	6	6
(Republic of Ireland) Henry Purcell	3	6	2	4
(Austria) Ludwig von Salm-Hoogstraeten	w/o
(United Kingdom) Noel Turnbull
(Japan) Yoshiro Ohta	6	2	1	2
(United States) Gregory Mangin	4	6	6	6
(Japan) Ryuki Miki	6	6	11	8
(United Kingdom) Jack Hillyard	1	3	13	6
(United Kingdom) Billy Collins	6	6	1	6
(United Kingdom) Ian Collins	2	4	6	4

Second round
6	(United Kingdom) H Austin	6	7	6
(Egypt) J Grandguillot	2	5	1
(France) PH Landry	6	7	0	3	6
(France) G Glasser	0	5	6	6	0
(United Kingdom) N Turnbull	2	5	0
(United States) G Mangin	6	7	6
(Japan) T Miki	6	6	7
(United Kingdom) W Collins	0	3	5

Third round
6	(United Kingdom) H Austin	6	6	6
(France) PH Landry	0	3	2
(United States) G Mangin	6	6	6
(Japan) T Miki	4	3	2

Fourth round
6	(United Kingdom) H Austin	7	8	0
(United States) G Mangin	9	10	6

=== Bottom half ===
==== Section 5 ====
First round
2	(United States) Bill Tilden	6	6	6
(India) Athar-Ali Fyzee	1	0	2
(United States) Edward Mather	6	8	7
(United Kingdom) JH Frowen	4	6	5
(United States) John Van Ryn	6	6	7
(Canada) WAH Duff	1	1	5
(United Kingdom) Jack Chamberlain
(Switzerland) Hector Chiesa	w/o
(Argentina) Jorge Williams	4	2	6	7
(United Kingdom) John Pennycuick	6	6	3	9
(India) Janmeja Charanjiva	4	5	6	6
(United Kingdom) Donald Greig	6	7	4	8
(Germany) Fritz Kuhlmann	2	0	6	6
(France) Jacques Brugnon	6	6	4	8
(Australia) James Willard	2	5	3
(New Zealand) Buster Andrews	6	7	6

Second round
2	(United States) W Tilden	6	6	6
(United States) E Mather	2	2	1
(United States) J Van Ryn	6	6	6
(United Kingdom) J Chamberlain	2	2	2
(United Kingdom) J Pennycuick	3	4	2
(United Kingdom) D Greig	6	6	6
(France) J Brugnon	3	7	3	0
(New Zealand) E Andrews	6	5	6	6

Third round
2	(United States) W Tilden	7	6	6
(United States) J Van Ryn	5	4	1
(United Kingdom) D Greig	3	5	2
(New Zealand) E Andrews	6	7	6

Fourth round
2	(United States) W Tilden	6	6	6
(New Zealand) E Andrews	4	4	2

==== Section 6 ====
First round
7	(Italy) Umberto de Morpurgo	6	6	6
(United Kingdom) Geoffrey de Ste. Croix	2	1	1
Q	(United Kingdom) Bob Tinkler	1	7	10
(United Kingdom) Jack Lysaght	6	9	12
(France) Claude de Ricou	w/o
Q	(United Kingdom) Orson Wright
(United Kingdom) Brame Hillyard	3	4	2
(United Kingdom) Fred Perry	6	6	6
(United Kingdom) Harry Lewis-Barclay	0	2	5
(United Kingdom) Colin Gregory	6	6	7
(Monaco) Vladimir Landau	8	4	3	6	6
(United Kingdom) Leslie Godfree	6	6	6	4	2
(United Kingdom) Colin Higgins	6	6	6
(United Kingdom) DM Evans	2	2	1
LL	(Malaysia) ENW Oliver	0	3	4
(Japan) Takeichi Harada	6	6	6

Second round
7	(Italy) H de Morpurgo	6	6	6
(United Kingdom) J Lysaght	4	2	1
Q	(United Kingdom) O Wright	1	2	3
(United Kingdom) F Perry	6	6	6
(United Kingdom) C Gregory	6	6	10
(Monaco) V Landau	1	3	8
(United Kingdom) C Higgins	4	2	3
(Japan) T Harada	6	6	6

Third round
7	(Italy) H de Morpurgo	8	6	1	2
(United Kingdom) F Perry	10	4	6	6
(United Kingdom) C Gregory	6	6	7
(Japan) T Harada	3	2	5

Fourth round
(United Kingdom) F Perry	6	7	1	6	1
(United Kingdom) C Gregory	3	9	6	3	6

==== Section 7 ====
First round
3	(France) Jean Borotra	6	6	6
(Republic of Ireland) F Crosbie	0	4	2
(United Kingdom) William Powell	4	7	2	4
(United Kingdom) Harry Lee	6	5	6	6
(United Kingdom) Kenneth Gandar-Dower	6	4	6	6
Q	(United Kingdom) WG Curtis-Morgan	4	6	1	2
(United Kingdom) John Olliff	6	9	3	6	6
Q	(United Kingdom) Brian Helmore	0	11	6	4	0
(United Kingdom) Victor Cazalet	6	6	7
(Netherlands) Jan van der Heide	2	2	5
(Hungary) Béla von Kehrling	2	8	6	6
(France) Raymond Rodel	6	6	3	3
(United Kingdom) Gwyn Tuckett	4	3	4
(United Kingdom) Philip Glover	6	6	6
(Czechoslovakia) Jan Koželuh	2	7	6	6
(United Kingdom) Norman Latchford	6	5	4	1

Second round
3	(France) J Borotra	5	3	6	6	6
(United Kingdom) H Lee	7	6	3	3	1
(United Kingdom) K Gandar-Dower	5	6	9	6
(United Kingdom) J Olliff	7	4	7	3
(United Kingdom) V Cazalet	2	3	3
(Hungary) B von Kehrling	6	6	6
(United Kingdom) P Glover	2	6	6	7	1
(Czechoslovakia) J Koželuh	6	1	4	9	6

Third round
3	(France) J Borotra	6	9	10
(United Kingdom) K Gandar-Dower	4	7	8
(Hungary) B von Kehrling	6	6	13
(Czechoslovakia) J Koželuh	3	4	11

Fourth round
3	(France) J Borotra	6	6	2	6
(Hungary) B von Kehrling	2	2	6	1

==== Section 8 ====
First round
5	(United States) George Lott	6	6	6
(India) Hira-Lal Soni	1	3	1
(United Kingdom) Charles Kingsley	7	6	6
(United Kingdom) Gordon Crole-Rees	5	2	2
(Australia) Harry Hopman	6	6	6
(Jamaica) Donald Leahong	0	0	2
(United Kingdom) Frank Wilde	6	6	6
(Belgium) André Lacroix	3	3	1
(India) Donald Rutnam	5	2	7
(France) Emmanuel du Plaix	7	6	9
(South Africa) Pat Spence	6	6	4	6
(United Kingdom) John Cecil Masterman	4	4	6	4
(Austria) Hermann Artens	w/o
(United Kingdom) George Godsell
(Japan) Tamio Abe	4	5	6	6	6
(United Kingdom) David Williams	6	7	1	2	2

Second round
5	(United States) G Lott	6	6	6
(United Kingdom) C Kingsley	3	4	4
(Australia) H Hopman	3	6	6	4	6
(United Kingdom) F Wilde	6	0	0	6	1
(France) E du Plaix	8	4	3	2
(South Africa) P Spence	6	6	6	6
(United Kingdom) G Godsell	1	6	2	4
(Japan) T Abe	6	3	6	6

Third round
5	(United States) G Lott	7	6	6
(Australia) H Hopman	5	3	3
(South Africa) P Spence	6	6	5	6
(Japan) T Abe	1	4	7	3

Fourth round
5	(United States) G Lott	6	6	10
(South Africa) P Spence	1	3	8

Preceded by 1930 French Championships	Grand Slams; Men's Singles	Succeeded by 1930 U.S. Championships
