= 1930 Wimbledon Championships – Women's singles =

Women's singles
- 1930 Wimbledon Championships

Final
- Champion: (United States) Helen Moody
- Runner-up: (United States) Elizabeth Ryan
- Score: 6–2, 6–2

Details
- Draw: 96 (10Q)
- Seeds: 8

Events
Singles	men	women		boys	girls
Doubles	men	women	mixed	boys	girls
- Wimbledon Championships

Helen Moody successfully defended her title, defeating Elizabeth Ryan in the final, 6–2, 6–2 to win the ladies' singles tennis title at the 1930 Wimbledon Championships.

== Seeds ==
1. (United States) Helen Moody (champion)
2. (United Kingdom) Phoebe Watson (withdrew due to illness)
3. (United States) Helen Jacobs (quarterfinals)
4. (Spain) Lili de Álvarez (withdrew due to illness)
5. (France) Simonne Mathieu (semifinals)
6. (Germany) Cilly Aussem (semifinals)
7. (United Kingdom) Phyllis Mudford (quarterfinals)
8. (United States) Elizabeth Ryan (final)

Click on the seed number of a player to go to their draw section.

== Draw ==
Key

- Q = Qualifier
- WC = Wild card
- LL = Lucky loser
- Alt = Alternate
- ITF = ITF entry
- PR = Protected ranking
- SR = Special ranking
- SE = Special exempt
- JE = Junior exempt
- JR = Junior Accelerator Programme entrant
- CO = College Accelerator Programme entrant
- NG = Next Gen Accelerator Program entrant
- w/o = Walkover
- r = Retired
- d = Defaulted

=== Finals ===
Quarterfinals
1	(United States) Helen Moody	6	6
7	(United Kingdom) Phyllis Mudford	1	2
(United Kingdom) Joan Ridley	2	1
5	(France) Simonne Mathieu	6	6
(United Kingdom) Betty Nuthall	2	6	0
8	(United States) Elizabeth Ryan	6	2	6
3	(United States) Helen Jacobs	2	1
6	(Germany) Cilly Aussem	6	6

Semifinals
1	(United States) Helen Moody	6	6
5	(France) Simonne Mathieu	3	2
8	(United States) Elizabeth Ryan	6	0	4
6	(Germany) Cilly Aussem	3	6	4^{r}

Final
1	(United States) Helen Moody	6	6
8	(United States) Elizabeth Ryan	2	2

=== Top half ===
==== Section 1 ====
First round

Second round
1	(United States) Helen Moody	6	6
(Germany) Hilde Krahwinkel	2	1
(United Kingdom) Enid Clarke	4	2
(United Kingdom) Evelyn Goldsworth	6	6
(United Kingdom) Mrs Bruce-May	3	6	5
Q	(United Kingdom) Lucy Johnstone	6	3	7
Q	(United Kingdom) Molly Hargreaves	2	4
(Netherlands) Mence Canters	6	6

Third round
1	(United States) H Moody	6	6
(United Kingdom) E Goldsworth	1	2
Q	(United Kingdom) L Johnstone	4	2
(Netherlands) M Canters	6	6

Fourth round
1	(United States) H Moody	6	6
(Netherlands) M Canters	0	1

==== Section 2 ====
First round

Second round
7	(United Kingdom) Phyllis Mudford	6	6
(United Kingdom) CFC Turner	1	1
Q	(United Kingdom) Enid Broadbridge	8	4	6
(United Kingdom) Gladys Thompson	6	6	2
Q	(United Kingdom) Grace Vaughton	2	6	6
(United Kingdom) Winifred Beamish	6	0	4
(United Kingdom) Betty Uber	6	5	7
(Denmark) Else Støckel	2	7	5

Third round
7	(United Kingdom) P Mudford	6	6
Q	(United Kingdom) E Broadbridge	2	2
Q	(United Kingdom) G Vaughton	3	2
(United Kingdom) E Uber	6	6

Fourth round
7	(United Kingdom) P Mudford	6	6
(United Kingdom) E Uber	0	0

==== Section 3 ====
First round
4	(Spain) Lilí de Álvarez	w/o
(United States) Mianne Palfrey
(United Kingdom) Betty Dix	6	6
(United Kingdom) EH Smith	0	3
(United Kingdom) CJ Tyrrell	3	1
(Australia) Esna Robertson	6	6
(United Kingdom) Christabel Hardie	4	6	6
(United Kingdom) Gethyn Harry	6	1	4
Q	(United Kingdom) Mrs H Ryland	2	3
(Germany) Anne Peitz	6	6
(United Kingdom) Jeanette Morfey	3	6	2
(United Kingdom) Elsie Pittman	6	3	6
(United Kingdom) Margaret Stocks	6	1	5
(United Kingdom) Joan Ridley	1	6	7
(United States) Sarah Palfrey	6	6
(United Kingdom) Billie Yorke	1	4

Second round
(United States) M Palfrey	6	4	2
(United Kingdom) B Dix	3	6	6
(Australia) E Robertson	6	6
(United Kingdom) C Hardie	2	4
(Germany) A Peitz	6	2	3
(United Kingdom) E Pittman	3	6	6
(United Kingdom) J Ridley	3	6	6
(United States) S Palfrey	6	4	1

Third round
(United Kingdom) B Dix	6	2	1
(Australia) E Robertson	3	6	6
(United Kingdom) E Pittman	5	7	5
(United Kingdom) J Ridley	7	5	7

Fourth round
(Australia) E Robertson	4	1
(United Kingdom) J Ridley	6	6

==== Section 4 ====
First round
5	(France) Simonne Mathieu	6	6
Q	(United Kingdom) Mrs JRM Brumwell	2	2
(United Kingdom) Violet Owen	1	5
(United Kingdom) Eileen Fearnley-Whittingstall	6	7
(United Kingdom) Evelyn Dearman	6	8
Q	(United Kingdom) Doris Eastley	1	6
(United Kingdom) Joan Fry	1	6	6
(United Kingdom) R Watson	6	2	4
(France) Aimée Charpenel	2	3
(United Kingdom) Gwen Sterry	6	6
(United Kingdom) Beatrice Feltham	6	4	6
(United Kingdom) Olga Webb	3	6	2
Q	(United Kingdom) Yvonne Law	1	4
(United Kingdom) Mary Heeley	6	6
(United Kingdom) Phyllis Satterthwaite	6	6
(United Kingdom) JL Colegate	0	3

Second round
5	(France) S Mathieu	6	6
(United Kingdom) E Fearnley-Whittingstall	4	3
(United Kingdom) E Dearman	4	8	4
(United Kingdom) J Fry	6	6	6
(United Kingdom) G Sterry	2	6	6
(United Kingdom) B Feltham	6	1	3
(United Kingdom) M Heeley	3	0
(United Kingdom) P Satterthwaite	6	6

Third round
5	(France) S Mathieu	6	6
(United Kingdom) J Fry	2	1
(United Kingdom) G Sterry	6	5	3
(United Kingdom) P Satterthwaite	2	7	6

Fourth round
5	(France) S Mathieu	6	7
(United Kingdom) P Satterthwaite	4	5

=== Bottom half ===
==== Section 5 ====
First round
2	(United Kingdom) Phoebe Watson	w/o
(United Kingdom) Betty Nuthall
(United Kingdom) Nancy Lyle	7	6
(Netherlands) Madzy Couquerque	5	4
(United Kingdom) Elsa Haylock	4	6	3
(United Kingdom) Davina Jameson	6	3	6
(Denmark) Else Dam	2	1
(United Kingdom) Effie Hemmant	6	6
(United Kingdom) Naomi Trentham	6	6
(United Kingdom) Joan Strawson	4	4
(United Kingdom) Ermyntrude Harvey	6	6	7
(France) Sylvie Henrotin	8	0	5
(United Kingdom) Sylvia Mayne	2	6	4
(United Kingdom) Mrs HV Edwards	6	4	6
(United Kingdom) Mary McIlquham	6	6
(United Kingdom) Vera Marshall	2	0

Second round
(United Kingdom) B Nuthall	6	6
(United Kingdom) N Lyle	3	4
(United Kingdom) D Jameson	6	6
(United Kingdom) E Hemmant	2	3
(United Kingdom) N Trentham	11	1	3
(United Kingdom) E Harvey	9	6	6
(United Kingdom) Mrs HV Edwards	2	1
(United Kingdom) M McIlquham	6	6

Third round
(United Kingdom) B Nuthall	6	6
(United Kingdom) D Jameson	4	3
(United Kingdom) E Harvey	6	6	2^{r}
(United Kingdom) M McIlquham	2	8	4

Fourth round
(United Kingdom) B Nuthall	6	6
(United Kingdom) M McIlquham	2	3

==== Section 6 ====
First round
8	(United States) Elizabeth Ryan	6	6
(United Kingdom) HM Brooke	2	3
(United Kingdom) Vera Montgomery	6	6
(United Kingdom) Helen Burr	4	2
(Belgium) Josane Sigart	3	6	6
(United States) Edith Cross	6	3	3
(United Kingdom) Janet Dudley-Cox	3	3
(United Kingdom) Davinia Gordon	6	6
(Switzerland) Lolette Payot	6	6
(France) Julie Vlasto	4	1
(United Kingdom) Margery Elton	6	6
Q	(United Kingdom) Marjorie Stork	3	2
(Australia) Kathleen Le Messurier	10	6
(United Kingdom) Peggy Scriven	8	1
(United States) Mary Greef	6	6
(Austria) Trudi Wolf	1	1

Second round
8	(United States) E Ryan	6	6
(United Kingdom) V Montgomery	2	4
(Belgium) J Sigart	6	6
(United Kingdom) D Gordon	1	2
(Switzerland) L Payot	6	8	6
(United Kingdom) M Elton	2	10	3
(Australia) K Le Messurier	2	6	5
(United States) M Greef	6	2	7

Third round
8	(United States) E Ryan	6	6
(Belgium) J Sigart	3	4
(Switzerland) L Payot	6	6
(United States) M Greef	4	3

Fourth round
8	(United States) E Ryan	6	3	8
(Switzerland) L Payot	0	6	6

==== Section 7 ====
First round

Second round
3	(United States) Helen Jacobs	6	6
(United Kingdom) Margaret Mellows	3	1
(United Kingdom) Madge Slaney	6	2	6
(India) Jenny Sandison	0	6	1
(France) Simone Barbier	2	4
(United Kingdom) Madge List	6	6
(United Kingdom) Dorothy Anderson	2	3
(United Kingdom) Sybil Johnson	6	6

Third round
3	(United States) H Jacobs	6	6
(United Kingdom) M Slaney	3	0
(United Kingdom) M List	6	6
(United Kingdom) S Johnson	1	2

Fourth round
3	(United States) H Jacobs	6	6
(United Kingdom) M List	0	1

==== Section 8 ====
First round

Second round
6	(Germany) Cilly Aussem	6	6
(United Kingdom) Winifred Bower	3	0
(France) Violette Gallay	1	1
(United Kingdom) Kathleen Bridge	6	6
Q	(United Kingdom) Freda James	6	6
(United Kingdom) Joan Lycett	3	3
(United Kingdom) Dorothy Round	6	6
(France) Jacqueline Gallay	1	4

Third round
6	(Germany) C Aussem	6	6
(United Kingdom) K Bridge	3	2
Q	(United Kingdom) W James	4	6	6
(United Kingdom) D Round	6	3	4

Fourth round
6	(Germany) C Aussem	7	6
Q	(United Kingdom) W James	5	4

Preceded by 1930 French Championships	Grand Slams; Women's Singles	Succeeded by 1930 U.S. National Championships
