= 1928 Wimbledon Championships – Women's doubles =

Women's doubles
- 1928 Wimbledon Championships

Final
- Champions: (United Kingdom) Peggy Saunders (United Kingdom) Phoebe Watson
- Runners-up: (United Kingdom) Eileen Bennett (United Kingdom) Ermyntrude Harvey
- Score: 6–2, 6–3

Details
- Draw: 40 (5Q)
- Seeds: 4

Events
Singles	men	women		boys	girls
Doubles	men	women	mixed	boys	girls
- Wimbledon Championships

Elizabeth Ryan and Helen Wills were the defending champions, but Wills did not participate. Ryan partnered with Joan Lycett, but lost in the semifinals to Peggy Saunders and Phoebe Watson.

Watson and Saunders defeated Eileen Bennett and Ermyntrude Harvey in the final, 6–2, 6–3 to win the ladies' doubles tennis title at the 1928 Wimbledon Championships.

== Seeds ==
1. (United Kingdom) Joan Lycett / (United States) Elizabeth Ryan (semifinals)
2. (United Kingdom) Eileen Bennett / (United Kingdom) Ermyntrude Harvey (final)
3. (United Kingdom) Peggy Saunders / (United Kingdom) Phoebe Watson (champions)
4. (Netherlands) Kea Bouman / (United Kingdom) Evelyn Colyer (quarterfinals)

Click on the seed number of a player to go to their draw section.

== Draw ==
Key

- Q = Qualifier
- WC = Wild card
- LL = Lucky loser
- Alt = Alternate
- ITF = ITF entry
- PR = Protected ranking
- SR = Special ranking
- SE = Special exempt
- JE = Junior exempt
- JR = Junior Accelerator Programme entrant
- CO = College Accelerator Programme entrant
- NG = Next Gen Accelerator Program entrant
- w/o = Walkover
- r = Retired
- d = Defaulted

=== Finals ===
Quarterfinals
2	(United Kingdom) Eileen Bennett (United Kingdom) Ermyntrude Harvey	7	4	6
(United Kingdom) Phyllis Covell (United Kingdom) Dorothy Shepherd-Barron	5	6	4
4	(Netherlands) Kea Bouman (United Kingdom) Evelyn Colyer	6	3
(Australia) Daphne Akhurst (Australia) Esna Boyd	8	6
1	(United Kingdom) Joan Lycett (United States) Elizabeth Ryan	7	9
(Australia) Louie Bickerton (Australia) Meryl O'Hara Wood	5	7
3	(United Kingdom) Peggy Saunders (United Kingdom) Phoebe Watson	6	6
(United Kingdom) JL Colegate (United Kingdom) CJ Tyrrell	3	1

Semifinals
2	(United Kingdom) Eileen Bennett (United Kingdom) Ermyntrude Harvey	6	6	6
(Australia) Daphne Akhurst (Australia) Esna Boyd	8	3	2
1	(United Kingdom) Joan Lycett (United States) Elizabeth Ryan	3	4
3	(United Kingdom) Peggy Saunders (United Kingdom) Phoebe Watson	6	6

Final
2	(United Kingdom) Eileen Bennett (United Kingdom) Ermyntrude Harvey	2	3
3	(United Kingdom) Peggy Saunders (United Kingdom) Phoebe Watson	6	6

=== Top half ===
==== Section 1 ====
First round

Second round
2	(United Kingdom) Eileen Bennett (United Kingdom) Ermyntrude Harvey	6	8
Q	(United Kingdom) Winifred Bower (United Kingdom) MF Harland	1	6
(Germany) Ellen Hoffman (United Kingdom) Phyllis Satterthwaite	6	3	4
Q	(United Kingdom) Madge List (United Kingdom) Peggy Pleydell-Bouverie	3	6	6
(United Kingdom) Phyllis Covell (United Kingdom) Dorothy Shepherd-Barron	6	6
(United Kingdom) Betty Boas (United Kingdom) H Evelyn-Jones	2	0
(United Kingdom) Violet Chamberlain (United Kingdom) Agnes Tuckey	6	6
(United Kingdom) Claire Beckingham (United Kingdom) Margaret Stocks	4	1

Third round
2	(United Kingdom) E Bennett (United Kingdom) E Harvey	6	6
Q	(United Kingdom) M List (United Kingdom) M Pleydell-Bouverie	1	3
(United Kingdom) P Covell (United Kingdom) D Shepherd-Barron	6	6
(United Kingdom) V Chamberlain (United Kingdom) A Tuckey	4	4

Quarterfinals
2	(United Kingdom) E Bennett (United Kingdom) E Harvey	7	4	6
(United Kingdom) P Covell (United Kingdom) D Shepherd-Barron	5	6	4

==== Section 2 ====
First round
(Australia) Daphne Akhurst (Australia) Esna Boyd	6	6	6
(United Kingdom) Mary Davies (United Kingdom) Davinia Gordon	3	8	3
(United Kingdom) Kathleen Bridge (United Kingdom) Mary McIlquham	5	6	7
(United States) Penelope Anderson (United States) Helen Jacobs	7	3	5
Q	(Republic of Ireland) Mrs RRW Jackson (United Kingdom) ES Stokes	3	6	4
(United Kingdom) Dorothy Alexander (United Kingdom) Mabel Mavrogordato	6	3	6
(United Kingdom) Domini Crosfield (Greece) Helene Nicolopoulos	1	4
(United Kingdom) Dorothy Shaw (United Kingdom) R Watson	6	6

Second round
4	(Netherlands) Kea Bouman (United Kingdom) Evelyn Colyer	6	6
(United Kingdom) Aurea Edgington (United Kingdom) Christabel Hardie	3	2
(United Kingdom) Sybil Johnson (United Kingdom) Eleanor Rose	6	6
Mrs Herriot (United Kingdom) Mrs WE Hudleston	3	2
(Australia) D Akhurst (Australia) E Boyd	6	6	6
(United States) P Anderson (United States) H Jacobs	3	8	4
(United Kingdom) D Alexander (United Kingdom) M Mavrogordato	1	3
(United Kingdom) D Shaw (United Kingdom) R Watson	6	6

Third round
4	(Netherlands) K Bouman (United Kingdom) E Colyer	8	2	6
(United Kingdom) S Johnson (United Kingdom) E Rose	6	6	3
(Australia) D Akhurst (Australia) E Boyd	7	6
(United Kingdom) D Shaw (United Kingdom) R Watson	5	4

Quarterfinals
4	(Netherlands) K Bouman (United Kingdom) E Colyer	6	3
(Australia) D Akhurst (Australia) E Boyd	8	6

The nationality of Mrs Herriot is unknown.

=== Bottom half ===
==== Section 3 ====
First round
1	(United Kingdom) Joan Lycett (United States) Elizabeth Ryan	6	6
(Netherlands) Madzy Couquerque (Denmark) Inga Sperling	4	0
(United Kingdom) Joan Fry (United Kingdom) Gwen Sterry	6	6
(United Kingdom) Cecily Marriott (United Kingdom) Madge Slaney	2	4
(United Kingdom) Elsie Goldsack (United Kingdom) Joan Ridley	5	5
Q	(United Kingdom) Effie Hemmant (United Kingdom) Joan Strawson	7	7
(United Kingdom) Winifred Beamish (United Kingdom) Marie Hazel	1	3
(Germany) Cilly Aussem (United Kingdom) Betty Nuthall	6	6

Second round
1	(United Kingdom) J Lycett (United States) E Ryan	6	3	6
(United Kingdom) J Fry (United Kingdom) G Sterry	4	6	2
Q	(United Kingdom) E Hemmant (United Kingdom) J Strawson	4	6	8
(Germany) C Aussem (United Kingdom) B Nuthall	6	4	6
(Australia) Louie Bickerton (Australia) Meryl O'Hara Wood	6	4	6
(United Kingdom) Enid Clarke (United Kingdom) MA Thomas	3	6	4
Q	(United Kingdom) Mrs HV Edwards (United Kingdom) EZ Stokes	12	3	8
(United Kingdom) Betty Dix (United Kingdom) Sylvia Lumley-Ellis	10	6	6

Third round
1	(United Kingdom) J Lycett (United States) E Ryan	6	6
Q	(United Kingdom) E Hemmant (United Kingdom) J Strawson	1	2
(Australia) L Bickerton (Australia) M O'Hara Wood	6	6
Q	(United Kingdom) Mrs HV Edwards (United Kingdom) EZ Stokes	2	3

Quarterfinals
1	(United Kingdom) J Lycett (United States) E Ryan	7	9
(Australia) L Bickerton (Australia) M O'Hara Wood	5	7

==== Section 4 ====
First round

Second round
3	(United Kingdom) Peggy Saunders (United Kingdom) Phoebe Watson	1	6	6
(Netherlands) Mence Canters (Belgium) Josane Sigart	6	2	4
(United Kingdom) GJ Gilder (United Kingdom) DE Munro	6	6
(France) Jacqueline Gallay (France) Violette Gallay	2	1
(Germany) Paula von Reznicek (Germany) Irmgard Rost	2	1
(United Kingdom) JL Colegate (United Kingdom) CJ Tyrrell	6	6
(France) Marguerite Bordes (France) Yvonne Bourgeois	6	6
(United Kingdom) Peggy Dransfield (United Kingdom) Hazel Hogarth	4	2

Third round
3	(United Kingdom) M Saunders (United Kingdom) P Watson	6	6
(United Kingdom) GJ Gilder (United Kingdom) DE Munro	2	3
(United Kingdom) JL Colegate (United Kingdom) CJ Tyrrell	7	7
(France) M Bordes (France) Y Bourgeois	5	5

Quarterfinals
3	(United Kingdom) M Saunders (United Kingdom) P Watson	6	6
(United Kingdom) JL Colegate (United Kingdom) CJ Tyrrell	3	1
