= Paula von Reznicek =

German tennis player and author

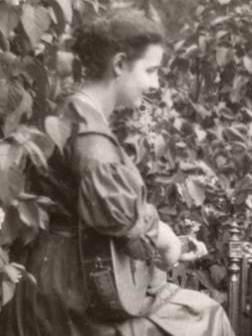
- Country (sports): Weimar Republic Germany
- Born: 17 October 1895 Breslau (current Wrocław), German Empire
- Died: 12 October 1976 (aged 80) Munich, West Germany
- Plays: Right-handed

Singles
- Highest ranking: No. 8 (1929)

Grand Slam singles results
- Wimbledon: 2R (1928)

Grand Slam doubles results
- Wimbledon: 2R (1928)

Grand Slam mixed doubles results
- Wimbledon: 1R (1927, 1928)

Paula von Reznicek (née Heimann; 17 October 1895 – 12 October 1976), was a German tennis player, journalist and author.

Paula Von Reznicek was born on 17 October 1895 (Note: Other sources, particularly Kürschners Deutscher Literatur-Kalender, mention her birthdate as 17 October 1900.) in Breslau, daughter of banker Georg Heimann and Valesca (Vally) Molinari.

She competed at the Wimbledon Championships in 1927 and 1928. Her best result in singles was reaching the second round in 1928 where she was defeated by fifth-seeded Kea Bouman. In 1928 the mother of fellow tennis player Cilly Aussem claimed that Von Reznicek had twice defeated her daughter by using hypnotism, which led to an altercation and a lawsuit in which Von Reznicek filed charges of 'defamation of character' and Aussem's mother charged her with 'insulting assault'. Von Reznicek won the singles title at the 1929 German Championships, held in Hamburg, after defeating Violet Chamberlain in the final in three sets. Von Reznicek won the singles title at the South of France Championships in 1928 and 1929, defeating Cilly Aussem and Phyllis Covell in the respective finals. The following year, 1930, she became the singles champion at the French Covered Court Championships after a win in the final against Marguerite Bordes.

She was ranked No. 8 in the world in 1929 by A. Wallis Myers of The Daily Telegraph and that same year was the No. 1 ranked player in Germany.

From 1928 onward she wrote several books including a biography of tennis player Gottfried von Cramm, published in 1949. She was a contributor to the illustrated magazine Die Dame (English: The Lady).

== Personal life ==
In 1925 she married sportsjournalist Burghard Freiherr von Reznicek whom she divorced in 1931. In 1932 she married German racing driver Hans Stuck with whom she had gone on a sports tour of South America and the United States in early 1932. They were divorced in 1948. Von Reznicek died on 12 October 1976, aged 80, in Munich.
