= 1923 Wimbledon Championships – Women's doubles =

Women's doubles
- 1923 Wimbledon Championships

Final
- Champions: (France) Suzanne Lenglen (United States) Elizabeth Ryan
- Runners-up: (United Kingdom) Joan Austin (United Kingdom) Evelyn Colyer
- Score: 6–3, 6–1

Details
- Draw: 38
- Seeds: –

Events
| Singles | men | women | | boys | girls |
| Doubles | men | women | mixed | boys | girls |
| ← 1922 · | Wimbledon Championships | · 1924 → |

Suzanne Lenglen and Elizabeth Ryan successfully defended their title, defeating Joan Austin and Evelyn Colyer in the final, 6–3, 6–1 to win the ladies' doubles tennis title at the 1923 Wimbledon Championships.

== Draw ==
=== Key ===
- Q = Qualifier
- WC = Wild card
- LL = Lucky loser
- Alt = Alternate
- SE = Special exempt
- PR = Protected ranking
- ITF = ITF entry
- JE = Junior exempt
- w/o = Walkover
- r = Retired
- d = Defaulted
- SR = Special ranking

=== Finals ===
Quarterfinals
(France) Suzanne Lenglen (United States) Elizabeth Ryan | 6 | 6
(United Kingdom) Winifred Beamish (United Kingdom) Winifred McNair | 1 | 2
(United Kingdom) Peggy Dransfield (United Kingdom) Hazel Hogarth | 2 | 0
(United Kingdom) Dorothea Lambert Chambers (United Kingdom) Kitty McKane | 6 | 6
(United Kingdom) Joan Austin (United Kingdom) Evelyn Colyer | 7 | 8
(United States) Eleanor Goss (France) Julie Vlasto | 5 | 6
(United Kingdom) Eleanor Rose (United Kingdom) Vera Youle | 6 | 4 | 9
(United Kingdom) JL Colegate (United Kingdom) CJ Tyrrell | 3 | 6 | 7

Semifinals
(France) Suzanne Lenglen (United States) Elizabeth Ryan | 6 | 6
(United Kingdom) Dorothea Lambert Chambers (United Kingdom) Kitty McKane | 1 | 2
(United Kingdom) Joan Austin (United Kingdom) Evelyn Colyer | 8 | 6
(United Kingdom) Eleanor Rose (United Kingdom) Vera Youle | 6 | 4

Final
(France) Suzanne Lenglen (United States) Elizabeth Ryan | 6 | 6
(United Kingdom) Joan Austin (United Kingdom) Evelyn Colyer | 3 | 1

=== Top half ===
==== Section 1 ====
First round

Second round
(United Kingdom) Sylvia Lumley-Ellis (United Kingdom) Mary McIlquham | 8 | 3 | 2
(United Kingdom) NQ Radcliffe-Platt (United Kingdom) PM Radcliffe | 6 | 6 | 6
(United Kingdom) Mrs Perrett (United Kingdom) C Rimington | 0 | 0
(France) Suzanne Lenglen (United States) Elizabeth Ryan | 6 | 6
Mrs Herriot (United Kingdom) Mrs WE Hudleston | 3 | 6 | 2
(United Kingdom) Ermyntrude Harvey (United Kingdom) Phyllis Satterthwaite | 6 | 4 | 6
(United States) Martha Bayard (United States) Katherine Gardner | 4 | 0
(United Kingdom) Winifred Beamish (United Kingdom) Winifred McNair | 6 | 6

Third round
(United Kingdom) NQ Radcliffe-Platt (United Kingdom) PM Radcliffe | 0 | 1
(France) S Lenglen (United States) E Ryan | 6 | 6
(United Kingdom) E Harvey (United Kingdom) P Satterthwaite | 8 | 4 | 3
(United Kingdom) W Beamish (United Kingdom) W McNair | 6 | 6 | 6

Quarterfinals
(France) S Lenglen (United States) E Ryan | 6 | 6
(United Kingdom) W Beamish (United Kingdom) W McNair | 1 | 2

The nationality of Mrs Herriot is unknown.

==== Section 2 ====
First round
Mrs G Gosling; Mrs D Harvey | 2 | 0
(United Kingdom) Mrs E Bousfield (United Kingdom) CI Kalber | 6 | 6
(Netherlands) Kea Bouman (United Kingdom) Annie Cobb | 0 | 1
(United Kingdom) Dorothea Lambert Chambers (United Kingdom) Kitty McKane | 6 | 6
(United Kingdom) Joan Reid-Thomas (United States) Eleonora Sears | 1 | 2
(United Kingdom) Louise Bull (United Kingdom) Ariadne Rodocanachi | 6 | 6

Second round
(Republic of Ireland) Mrs RRW Jackson (United Kingdom) Mrs FS Warburg | w/o
(United Kingdom) Blanche Colston (United Kingdom) Mrs J O'Neill
(United Kingdom) Peggy Dransfield (United Kingdom) Hazel Hogarth | 6 | 6
(United Kingdom) Mrs AA Hall (United Kingdom) Phoebe Holcroft | 3 | 1
(United States) Leslie Bancroft (United States) Molla Mallory | 3 | 6 | 6
(United Kingdom) Mrs E Bousfield (United Kingdom) CI Kalber | 6 | 1 | 3
(United Kingdom) D Lambert Chambers (United Kingdom) K McKane | 6 | 6
(United Kingdom) L Bull (United Kingdom) A Rodocanachi | 0 | 1

Third round
(United Kingdom) B Colston (United Kingdom) Mrs J O'Neill | w/o
(United Kingdom) P Dransfield (United Kingdom) H Hogarth
(United States) L Bancroft (United States) M Mallory | 3 | 0
(United Kingdom) D Lambert Chambers (United Kingdom) K McKane | 6 | 6

Quarterfinals
(United Kingdom) P Dransfield (United Kingdom) H Hogarth | 2 | 0
(United Kingdom) D Lambert Chambers (United Kingdom) K McKane | 6 | 6

The nationalities of Mrs G Gosling and Mrs D Harvey are unknown.

=== Bottom half ===
==== Section 3 ====
First round
(United Kingdom) Joan Austin (United Kingdom) Evelyn Colyer | 6 | 6
(United Kingdom) L Cadle (United Kingdom) Molly Welsh | 4 | 4
(United Kingdom) Joy Coote (United Kingdom) Mrs HV Parbury | 6 | 6
(United Kingdom) Marie Hazel (United Kingdom) Mabel Parton | 2 | 4
(United Kingdom) Mrs WL Hollick (United Kingdom) Cecily Marriott | 6 | 6 | 6
(United Kingdom) Mrs IFL Elliot (United Kingdom) SM Fison | 8 | 1 | 2

Second round
(United Kingdom) J Austin (United Kingdom) E Colyer | 7 | 6 | 6
(United Kingdom) J Coote (United Kingdom) Mrs HV Parbury | 9 | 2 | 3
(United Kingdom) Mrs WL Hollick (United Kingdom) C Marriott | 0 | 2
(United Kingdom) Enid Clarke (United Kingdom) Mabel Clayton | 6 | 6
(United Kingdom) Mrs GB Goodes (United Kingdom) Nancy Heath | 1 | 0
(United States) Eleanor Goss (France) Julie Vlasto | 6 | 6
(United Kingdom) Norah Middleton (United Kingdom) Mrs HB Weston | 6 | 6 | 7
(United Kingdom) Claire Beckingham (United Kingdom) EM Beckingham | 8 | 4 | 5

Third round
(United Kingdom) J Austin (United Kingdom) E Colyer | 4 | 7 | 6
(United Kingdom) E Clarke (United Kingdom) M Clayton | 6 | 5 | 2
(United States) E Goss (France) J Vlasto | 3 | 6 | 6
(United Kingdom) N Middleton (United Kingdom) Mrs HB Weston | 6 | 3 | 3

Quarterfinals
(United Kingdom) J Austin (United Kingdom) E Colyer | 7 | 8
(United States) E Goss (France) J Vlasto | 5 | 6

==== Section 4 ====
First round

Second round
(United Kingdom) Eleanor Rose (United Kingdom) Vera Youle | 6 | 6
(United Kingdom) Dorothy Holman (United Kingdom) Kathleen Lidderdale | 2 | 2
(France) Elizabeth Macready (United Kingdom) Violet Pinckney | 1 | 6
(United Kingdom) Mrs Bruce-May; Mrs van Praagh | 6 | 8
(United Kingdom) JL Colegate (United Kingdom) CJ Tyrrell | 6 | 6
(United Kingdom) Phyllis Covell (United Kingdom) Dorothy Shepherd-Barron | 2 | 3
(United Kingdom) Enid Head (United Kingdom) Peggy Ingram | 6 | 1 | 2
(United Kingdom) Doris Craddock (United Kingdom) Aurea Edgington | 3 | 6 | 6

Third round
(United Kingdom) E Rose (United Kingdom) V Youle | 6 | 5 | 6
(United Kingdom) Mrs Bruce-May; Mrs van Praagh | 4 | 7 | 0
(United Kingdom) JL Colegate (United Kingdom) CJ Tyrrell | 6 | 8 | 6
(United Kingdom) D Craddock (United Kingdom) A Edgington | 2 | 10 | 0

Quarterfinals
(United Kingdom) E Rose (United Kingdom) V Youle | 6 | 4 | 9
(United Kingdom) JL Colegate (United Kingdom) CJ Tyrrell | 3 | 6 | 7

The nationality of Mrs van Praagh is unknown.
