= 1930 Wimbledon Championships – Women's doubles =

Women's doubles
- 1930 Wimbledon Championships

Final
- Champions: (United States) Helen Moody (United States) Elizabeth Ryan
- Runners-up: (United States) Edith Cross (United States) Sarah Palfrey
- Score: 6–2, 9–7

Details
- Draw: 48 (5Q)
- Seeds: 4

Events
Singles	men	women		boys	girls
Doubles	men	women	mixed	boys	girls
- Wimbledon Championships

Phoebe Holcroft Watson and Peggy Michell were the defending champions, but Michell did not participate. Watson partnered with Kitty Godfree but withdrew before the first round.

Helen Moody and Elizabeth Ryan defeated Edith Cross and Sarah Palfrey in the final, 6–2, 9–7 to win the ladies' doubles tennis title at the 1929 Wimbledon Championships.

== Seeds ==
1. (United States) Helen Moody / (United States) Elizabeth Ryan (champions)
2. (United Kingdom) Kitty Godfree / (United Kingdom) Phoebe Watson (withdrew)
3. (United Kingdom) Joan Fry / (United Kingdom) Ermyntrude Harvey (withdrew)
4. (United States) Edith Cross / (United States) Sarah Palfrey (final)

Click on the seed number of a player to go to their draw section.

== Draw ==
Key

- Q = Qualifier
- WC = Wild card
- LL = Lucky loser
- Alt = Alternate
- ITF = ITF entry
- PR = Protected ranking
- SR = Special ranking
- SE = Special exempt
- JE = Junior exempt
- JR = Junior Accelerator Programme entrant
- CO = College Accelerator Programme entrant
- NG = Next Gen Accelerator Program entrant
- w/o = Walkover
- r = Retired
- d = Defaulted

=== Finals ===
Quarterfinals
(United Kingdom) Beatrice Feltham (United Kingdom) Mary Heeley	4	7	10
(United Kingdom) Betty Dix (United Kingdom) Elsa Haylock	6	5	8
4	(United States) Edith Cross (United States) Sarah Palfrey	4	10	6
(United Kingdom) Eileen Fearnley-Whittingstall (United Kingdom) Betty Nuthall	6	8	3
1	(United States) Helen Moody (United States) Elizabeth Ryan	6	6
(United Kingdom) Dorothy Hill (United Kingdom) Joan Lycett	2	0
(France) Simone Barbier (France) Simonne Mathieu	2	2
(France) Sylvie Henrotin (Belgium) Josane Sigart	6	6

Semifinals
(United Kingdom) Beatrice Feltham (United Kingdom) Mary Heeley	6	2
4	(United States) Edith Cross (United States) Sarah Palfrey	8	6
1	(United States) Helen Moody (United States) Elizabeth Ryan	6	6
(France) Sylvie Henrotin (Belgium) Josane Sigart	2	0

Final
4	(United States) Edith Cross (United States) Sarah Palfrey	2	7
1	(United States) Helen Moody (United States) Elizabeth Ryan	6	9

=== Top half ===
==== Section 1 ====
First round

Second round
2	(United Kingdom) Kitty Godfree (United Kingdom) Phoebe Watson	w/o
(Netherlands) Mence Canters (Netherlands) Madzy Couquerque
(United Kingdom) Beatrice Feltham (United Kingdom) Mary Heeley	6	6
(United Kingdom) KEC Lewis (United Kingdom) Betty Uber	1	4
(United Kingdom) Betty Dix (United Kingdom) Elsa Haylock	6	6
(United Kingdom) Margaret Mellows (United Kingdom) Olga Webb	1	3
(United Kingdom) Phyllis Mudford (United Kingdom) Gwen Sterry	6	6
(United Kingdom) MK Phayre (United Kingdom) Mrs HW Standring	1	3

Third round
(Netherlands) M Canters (Netherlands) M Couquerque	4	2
(United Kingdom) B Feltham (United Kingdom) M Heeley	6	6
(United Kingdom) M Dix (United Kingdom) E Haylock	9	9
(United Kingdom) P Mudford (United Kingdom) G Sterry	7	7

Quarterfinals
(United Kingdom) B Feltham (United Kingdom) M Heeley	4	7	10
(United Kingdom) M Dix (United Kingdom) E Haylock	6	5	8

==== Section 2 ====
First round
4	(United States) Edith Cross (United States) Sarah Palfrey	6	6
Q	(United Kingdom) Eileen Antrobus (United Kingdom) Freda James	4	1
(United Kingdom) Kathleen Bridge (United Kingdom) Mary McIlquham	6	6
(United Kingdom) Vera Marshall (United Kingdom) EH Smith	0	3
(United Kingdom) Cecily Marriott (United Kingdom) Madge Slaney	4	6	6
(United Kingdom) Sylvia Mayne (United Kingdom) Vera Montgomery	6	4	8
(Denmark) Else Dam (Denmark) Else Støckel	5	0
(United Kingdom) Evelyn Dearman (United Kingdom) Mrs HV Edwards	7	6
(Germany) Cilly Aussem (United States) Mianne Palfrey	8	3	5
(United Kingdom) JL Colegate (United Kingdom) CJ Tyrrell	6	6	7
(United Kingdom) Elsie Pittman (United Kingdom) Joan Ridley	6	6
(France) Jacqueline Gallay (France) Violette Gallay	3	4
(United Kingdom) Eileen Fearnley-Whittingstall (United Kingdom) Betty Nuthall	6	6
(United Kingdom) Dorothy Round (United Kingdom) Naomi Trentham	2	0
(Germany) Hilde Krahwinkel (Germany) Anne Peitz	6	2	6
Q	(United Kingdom) Lucy Johnstone (United Kingdom) Mie Johnstone	3	6	4

Second round
4	(United States) E Cross (United States) S Palfrey	6	7
(United Kingdom) K Bridge (United Kingdom) M McIlquham	2	5
(United Kingdom) S Mayne (United Kingdom) V Montgomery	1	7	6
(United Kingdom) E Dearman (United Kingdom) Mrs HV Edwards	6	5	0
(United Kingdom) JL Colegate (United Kingdom) CJ Tyrrell	2	6	6
(United Kingdom) E Pittman (United Kingdom) J Ridley	6	3	3
(United Kingdom) E Fearnley-Whittingstall (United Kingdom) B Nuthall	6	6
(Germany) H Krahwinkel (Germany) A Peitz	3	2

Third round
4	(United States) E Cross (United States) S Palfrey	7	6
(United Kingdom) S Mayne (United Kingdom) V Montgomery	5	4
(United Kingdom) JL Colegate (United Kingdom) CJ Tyrrell	2	2
(United Kingdom) E Fearnley-Whittingstall (United Kingdom) B Nuthall	6	6

Quarterfinals
4	(United States) E Cross (United States) S Palfrey	4	10	6
(United Kingdom) E Fearnley-Whittingstall (United Kingdom) B Nuthall	6	8	3

=== Bottom half ===
==== Section 3 ====
First round
1	(United States) Helen Moody (United States) Elizabeth Ryan	6	6
(United Kingdom) Helen Burr (United Kingdom) Gladys Thompson	0	0
Q	(United Kingdom) Gladys Osborne; Mrs BC Windle	2	6
(India) Jenny Sandison; Mrs EC Simon	6	8
(United Kingdom) Dorothy Jameson (United Kingdom) R Watson	7	4	6
(United Kingdom) NQ Radcliffe-Platt (United Kingdom) PM Radcliffe	5	6	1
(United Kingdom) Janet Dudley-Cox; Mrs LA McKenna	2	0
(United Kingdom) Violet Owen (United Kingdom) Margaret Stocks	6	6
(United Kingdom) Madge List (United Kingdom) Nancy Lyle	6	6
Q	DM Furnivall; L Philip	1	1
(United Kingdom) Phyllis Satterthwaite (Austria) Trudi Wolf	4	3
(Australia) Kathleen Le Messurier (Australia) Esna Robertson	6	6
(Switzerland) Lolette Payot (United Kingdom) MA Thomas	4	3
(United Kingdom) Sybil Johnson (United Kingdom) Eleanor Rose	6	6
(United Kingdom) Christabel Hardie (United Kingdom) Mrs WT Tucker	4	2
(United Kingdom) Dorothy Hill (United Kingdom) Joan Lycett	6	6

Second round
1	(United States) H Moody (United States) E Ryan	6	6
(India) J Sandison; Mrs EC Simon	0	4
(United Kingdom) D Jameson (United Kingdom) R Watson	7	6
(United Kingdom) V Owen (United Kingdom) M Stocks	9	8
(United Kingdom) M List (United Kingdom) N Lyle	6	2	6
(Australia) K Le Messurier (Australia) E Robertson	1	6	2
(United Kingdom) S Johnson (United Kingdom) E Rose	7	4	2
(United Kingdom) D Hill (United Kingdom) J Lycett	5	6	6

Third round
1	(United States) H Moody (United States) E Ryan	6	6
(United Kingdom) V Owen (United Kingdom) M Stocks	1	3
(United Kingdom) M List (United Kingdom) N Lyle	2	1
(United Kingdom) D Hill (United Kingdom) J Lycett	6	6

Quarterfinals
1	(United States) H Moody (United States) E Ryan	6	6
(United Kingdom) D Hill (United Kingdom) J Lycett	2	0

The nationalities of Mrs BC Windle, Mrs EC Simon, Mrs LA McKenna, Miss DM Furnivall and Miss L Philip are unknown.

==== Section 4 ====
First round

Second round
3	(United Kingdom) Joan Fry (United Kingdom) Ermyntrude Harvey	w/o
(France) Simone Barbier (France) Simonne Mathieu
(United Kingdom) Enid Clarke (United Kingdom) Davinia Gordon	8	5	3
LL	(United Kingdom) Joan Ingram (United Kingdom) Peggy Pleydell-Bouverie	6	7	6
(France) Sylvie Henrotin (Belgium) Josane Sigart	6	6
Q	(United Kingdom) ES Stokes (United Kingdom) EZ Stokes	1	1
(United Kingdom) Winifred Beamish (United Kingdom) Agnes Tuckey	2	3
(United Kingdom) Effie Hemmant (United Kingdom) Joan Strawson	6	6

Third round
(France) S Barbier (France) S Mathieu	6	6	6
LL	(United Kingdom) J Ingram (United Kingdom) M Pleydell-Bouverie	8	4	3
(France) S Henrotin (Belgium) J Sigart	6	8
(United Kingdom) E Hemmant (United Kingdom) J Strawson	4	6

Quarterfinals
2	2
(France) S Henrotin (Belgium) J Sigart	6	6
