= Mianne Palfrey =

American tennis player (1911–1993)

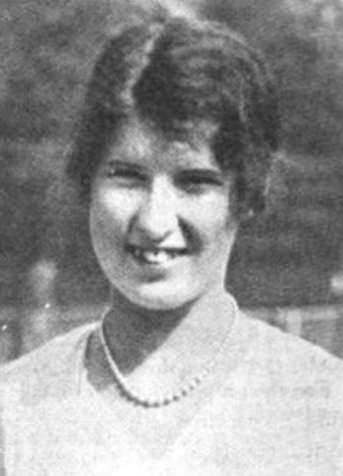
- Palfrey in 1930
- Full name: Mary Ann Palfrey Dexter
- Country (sports): United States
- Born: March 6, 1911 Boston, Massachusetts, US
- Died: November 2, 1993 (aged 82)
- Plays: Right-handed

Singles

Grand Slam singles results
- Wimbledon: 2R (1930)
- US Open: 2R (1930, 1931, 1932)

Doubles

Grand Slam doubles results
- Wimbledon: 1R (1930)
- US Open: QF (1930, 1931)

Grand Slam mixed doubles results
- Wimbledon: 2R (1930)
- US Open: 2R (1931)

Mary Ann "Mianne" Palfrey (March 6, 1911 – November 2, 1993) was an American tennis player who was active in the late 1920s and early 1930s.

== Biography ==
Mianne was the daughter of John Palfrey, a lawyer, and Methyl Oakes. She was part of a quintet of tennis playing sisters, together with Sarah, Lee, Polly and Joanne.

Palfrey won the girls' national indoor singles title in 1929, defeating her sister Sarah in the final. In addition she won the girls' indoor doubles titles, partnering Sarah, in 1927, 1928 and 1929.

In February 1930, she won the singles title at the U.S. Indoor Championships, held at the Longwood Covered Courts in Chestnut Hill, defeating the 1924 and 1925 champion Marion Zinderstein Jessup in the final in straight sets.

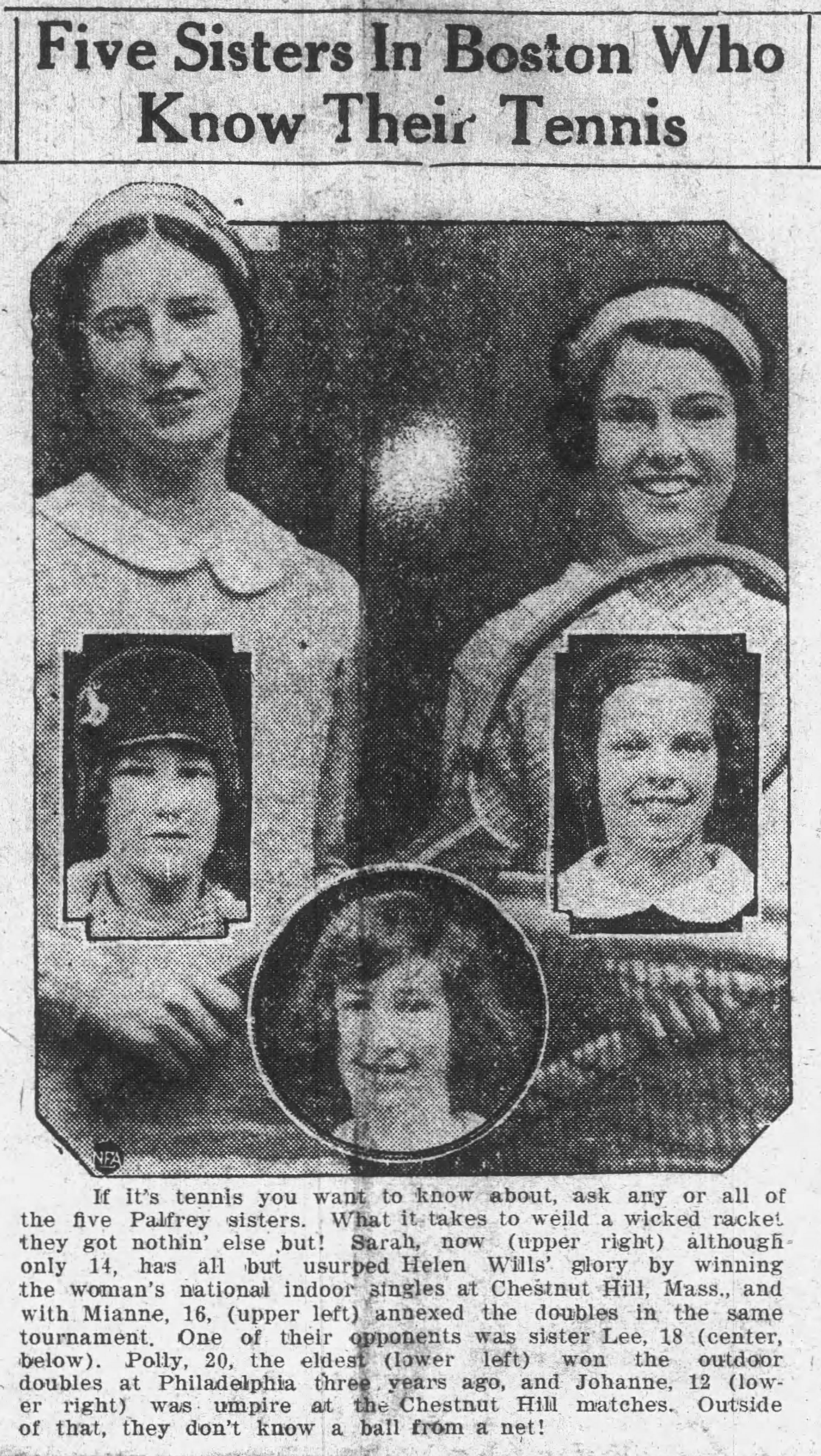
Palfrey sisters(1927)

On August 27, 1932, she married Arthur Dehon Hill in Sharon, Massachusetts but they divorced several years later. They had one daughter. She married Franklin Dexter on August 5, 1939, in Brookline, Massachusetts. On return from their honeymoon in Scotland at the outset of World War II their ship, the passenger liner SS Athenia, was torpedoed by the German U-boat U-30 and sank but the couple survived. With Franklin, she bore four children. Franklin Dexter died in July 1977.
