= Mence Dros-Canters =

Dutch hockey, tennis and badminton player

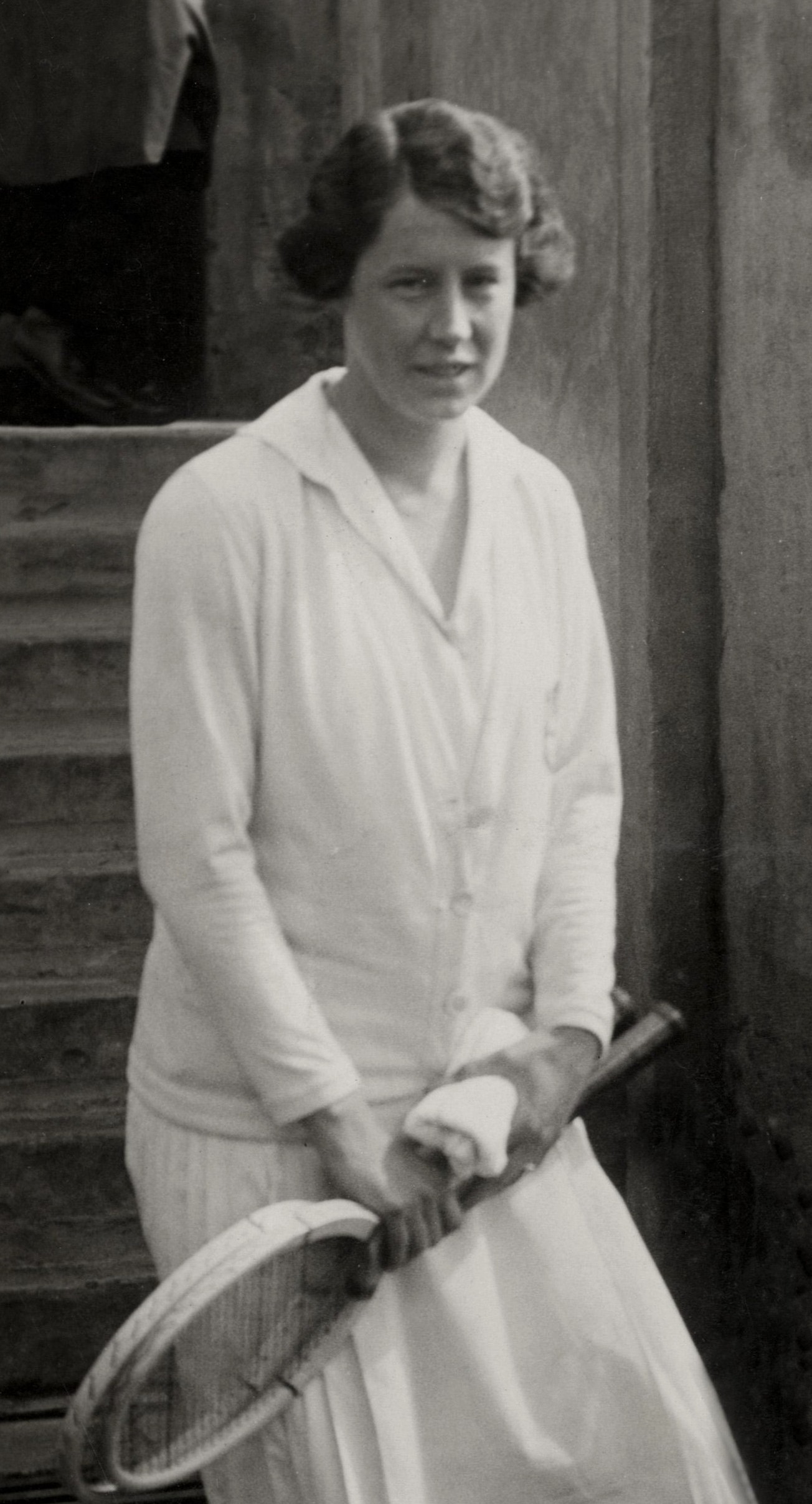
- Mence Dros-Canters in 1928
- Full name: Margaretha Clementina Dros-Canters
- Country (sports): Netherlands
- Born: 5 March 1900 Kediri, Dutch East Indies
- Died: 14 August 1934 (aged 34) Velp, Netherlands

Grand Slam singles results
- French Open: 2R (1928)
- Wimbledon: 4R (1930)

Grand Slam doubles results
- French Open: QF (1932)
- Wimbledon: 3R (1930)

Grand Slam mixed doubles results
- Wimbledon: 3R (1928, 1930)

Mence Dros-Canters (5 March 1900 – 14 August 1934) was a Dutch female hockey, badminton, and tennis player who was active from the 1920s until her death in 1934. She won seven national tennis titles and made 12 appearances in the Dutch national hockey team.

== Sports career ==
=== Tennis ===
Dros-Canters became Dutch doubles tennis champion six times between 1927 and 1933. In addition, she won the national mixed doubles title in 1930.

Between 1925 and 1931, she participated in five Wimbledon Championships. Her best result in the singles event was reaching the fourth round in 1930, losing in straight sets to eventual champion and World no.1 Helen Wills-Moody. Also in 1930, she reached the third round in the doubles events partnering compatriot Madzy Rollin Couquerque. With Henk Timmer, she reached the third round of the mixed doubles in 1928 and 1930.

She took part in the French Championships on three occasions. She reached the second round at the 1928 Championships after a bye in the first round. In 1932 and 1933, she lost in the first round of the singles event. With Madzy Rollin Couquerque, she reached the quarterfinal of the doubles event in 1932.

=== Hockey ===
In the winter months, she played field hockey for HOC (HHV-ODIS Combinatie) in The Hague. (Note: In 1951 HOC merged with GHC de Gazellen to form HGC (HOC-Gazellen Combinatie).) HOC, with Drost-Canters and her tennis doubles partner Madzy Rollin Couquerque, were the national champion between 1921 and 1935. Drost-Canters would make 12 appearances for the Dutch national team.

=== Badminton ===
In 1932, she became the Dutch badminton champion in the singles event, the doubles and mixed doubles.

== Personal life ==
She married businessman Adrian Dros jr. on 17 March 1931 and lived in Leiden. She became seriously ill at the end of 1933 and died on 14 August 1934 at the age of 34.
