= 1930 Wimbledon Championships =

- Date: 23 June – 7 July
- Edition: 50th
- Category: Grand Slam
- Surface: Grass
- Location: Church Road; SW19, Wimbledon, London, United Kingdom
- Venue: All England Lawn Tennis and Croquet Club

Champions

Men's singles
- (United States) Bill Tilden

Women's singles
- (United States) Helen Moody

Men's doubles
- (United States) Wilmer Allison / (United States) John Van Ryn

Women's doubles
- (United States) Helen Moody / (United States) Elizabeth Ryan

Mixed doubles
- (Australia) Jack Crawford / (United States) Elizabeth Ryan
← 1929 ·	Wimbledon Championships	· 1931 →

The 1930 Wimbledon Championships took place on the outdoor grass courts at the All England Lawn Tennis and Croquet Club in Wimbledon, London, United Kingdom. The tournament was scheduled to run from Monday 23 June until Saturday 5 July 1930 but the men's doubles final was postponed to Monday 7 July to allow Wilmer Allison time to recuperate after his men's singles final. It was the 50th staging of the Wimbledon Championships, and the third Grand Slam tennis event of 1930. Bill Tilden and Helen Moody won the singles titles.

== Champions ==
=== Men's singles ===
(United States) Bill Tilden defeated (United States) Wilmer Allison, 6–3, 9–7, 6–4

=== Women's singles ===
(United States) Helen Moody defeated (United States) Elizabeth Ryan, 6–2, 6–2

=== Men's doubles ===
(United States) Wilmer Allison / (United States) John Van Ryn defeated (United States) John Doeg / (United States) George Lott, 6–3, 6–3, 6–2

=== Women's doubles ===
(United States) Helen Moody / (United States) Elizabeth Ryan defeated (United States) Edith Cross / (United States) Sarah Palfrey, 6–2, 9–7

=== Mixed doubles ===
(Australia) Jack Crawford / (United States) Elizabeth Ryan defeated (Germany) Daniel Prenn / (Germany) Hilde Krahwinkel, 6–1, 6–3

Preceded by 1930 French Championships	Grand Slams	Succeeded by 1930 U.S. National Championships
