= Tamio Abe =

Japanese tennis player (1902–1987)

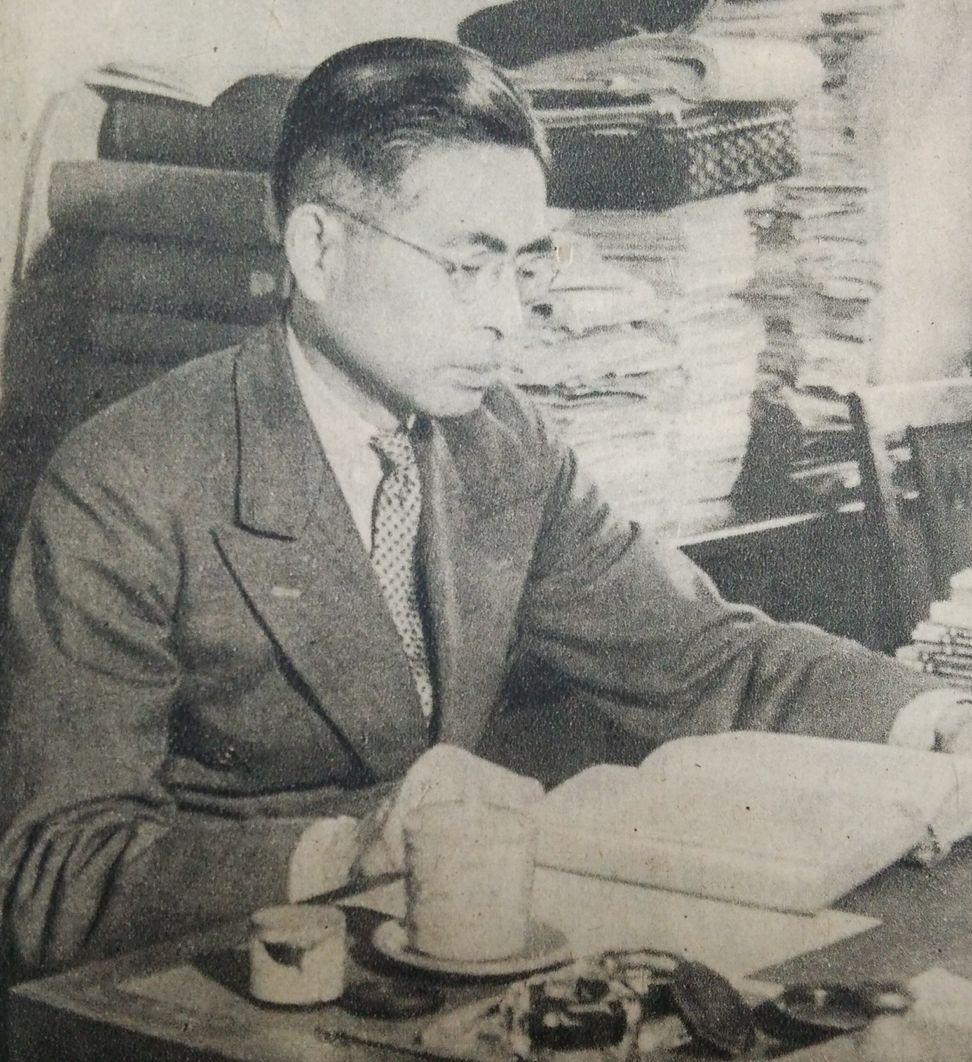
- Native name: 安部民雄
- Country (sports): Japan
- Born: 29 September 1902; Tokyo, Japan
- Died: 30 December 1987 (aged 85)

Singles

Grand Slam singles results
- French Open: 3R (1930)
- Wimbledon: 3R (1930)
- US Open: 4R (1929)

Tamio Abe (29 September 1902 – 30 December 1987) was a Japanese tennis player.

Born in Tokyo, Abe was the eldest son of Japanese baseball pioneer, preacher and parliamentarian Abe Isoo.

Abe, the 1927 All-Japan singles champion, debuted for the Japan Davis Cup team in 1928. He reached the singles fourth round of the 1929 U.S. National Championships and during the same tour claimed the singles title at the Delaware State Championships. In 1930 he made the third round of both the French Championships and Wimbledon. He featured in the Davis Cup for the final time as a player in 1930 but returned as non playing captain in 1938 .

A graduate of Waseda University, Abe had a career as an academic in the field of philosophy.

== See also ==
- List of Japan Davis Cup team representatives
