= Daniel Prenn =

British tennis player (1904–1991)

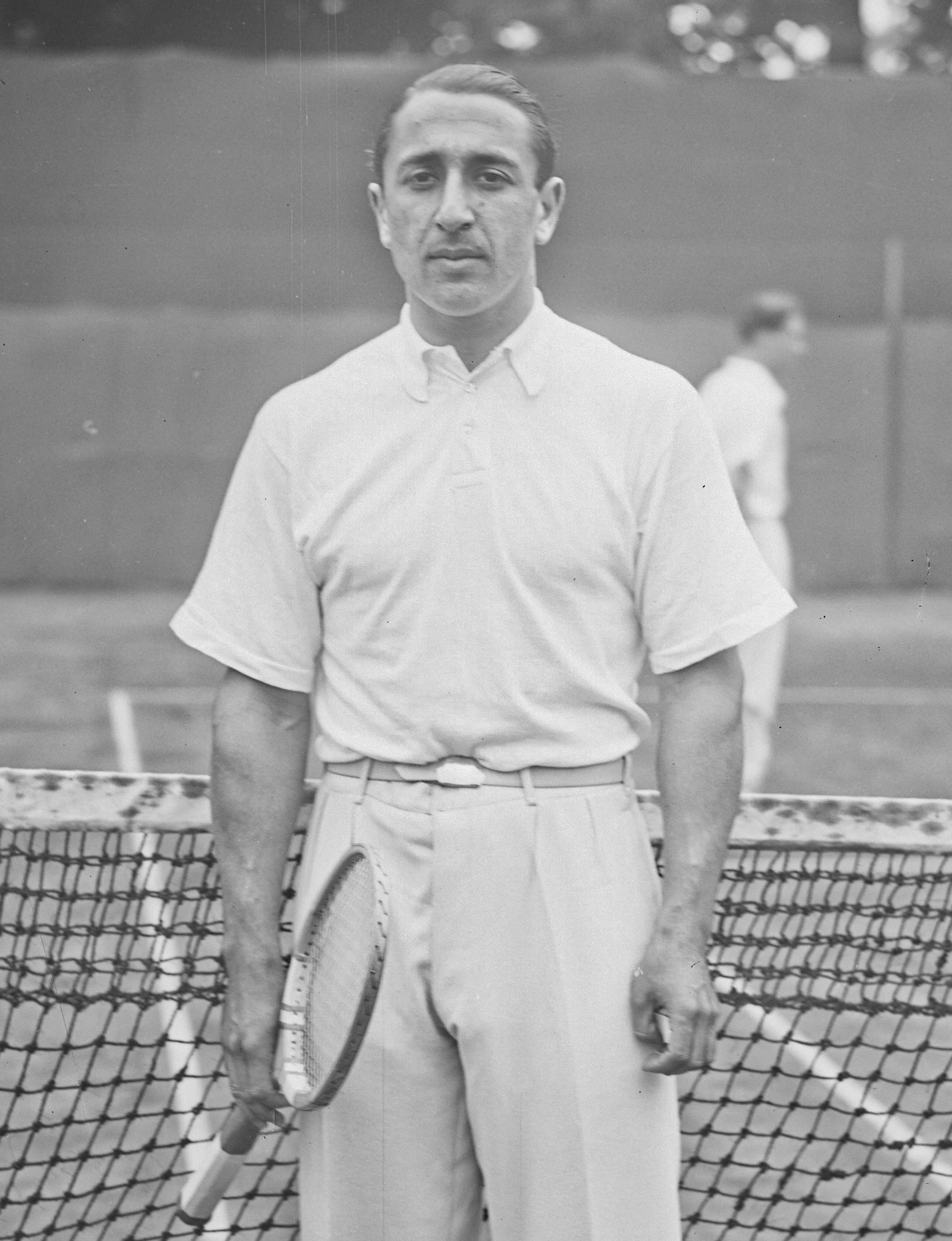
- Prenn in 1930
- Country (sports): Poland (until 1932) (Germany) Weimar Republic (1932–33); United Kingdom (1940–)
- Born: 7 September 1904 Vilna, Russian Empire (now Lithuania)
- Died: 3 September 1991 (aged 86) Dorking, Great Britain
- Turned pro: 1928 (amateur tour)
- Retired: 1939
- Plays: Right-handed (one-handed backhand)

Singles
- Career record: 172–59 (74.4%)
- Career titles: 10
- Highest ranking: No. 6 (1932, A. Wallis Myers)

Grand Slam singles results
- French Open: 4R (1930, 1933)
- Wimbledon: 4R (1933, 1937)

Doubles
- Highest ranking: No. 7 (1934)

Grand Slam doubles results
- French Open: QF (1934)
- Wimbledon: SF (1934)

Grand Slam mixed doubles results
- French Open: QF (1930)
- Wimbledon: F (1930)

Team competitions
- Davis Cup: F (1932)

Daniel Prenn (7 September 1904 – 3 September 1991) was a Russian-born German, Polish, and British tennis player of Jewish origin. He was ranked the world No. 6 for 1932 by A. Wallis Myers. He was ranked world No. 8 in 1929 (Bill Tilden), world No. 7 in 1934 (American Lawn Tennis), and was ranked No. 1 in Germany for the four years from 1928 to 1932. He was a runner-up for the mixed doubles title of Wimbledon in 1930. When the Nazis came to power in Germany in 1933, they barred him from playing because he was Jewish. He emigrated from Germany to England, and later became a successful businessman.

== Early life ==
Prenn was born on 7 September 1904 in Vilna, Russian Empire (current Vilnius, Lithuania) to a railway building contractor, and was Jewish. His parents were Polish. He grew up primarily in Saint Petersburg, in the Russian Empire. To escape local antisemitism, the family moved to Berlin after World War I, in 1920.

Apart from tennis, Prenn was an amateur boxer and runner. He graduated from the Technische Hochschule of Charlottenberg, Germany, earning a doctorate in civil engineering in 1929.

== Table tennis career ==
Prenn represented Germany in the 1926 World Table Tennis Championships in London, reaching the fourth round in singles and the quarterfinals in doubles.

== Tennis career ==
After arriving in Berlin Prenn first became a member of Tennis-Club Borussia, then switched to Rot-Weiss Tennis Club.

In 1928 he won the singles title at the International German Tennis Championships, held at Am Rothenbaum in Hamburg, defeating Hans Moldenhauer in the final.

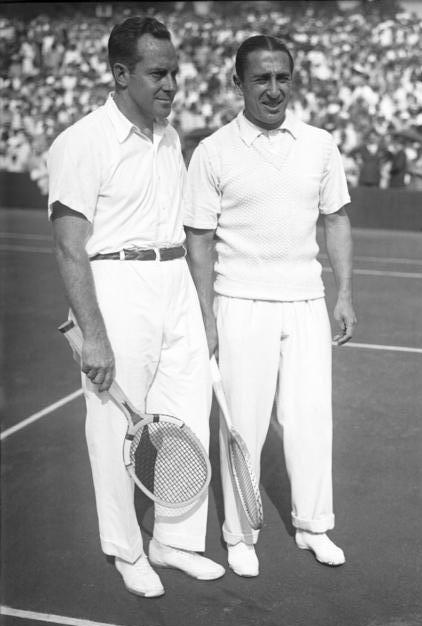
American Francis "Frank" Hunter (left) and Prenn, in 1929.

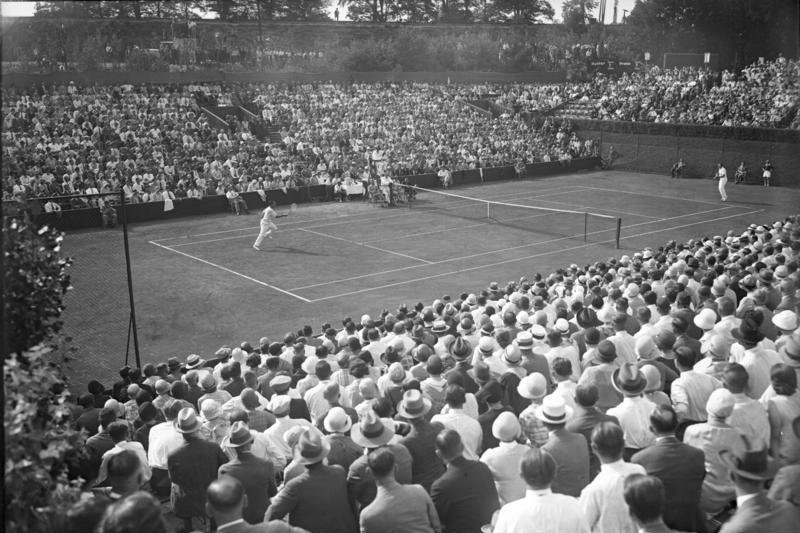
Prenn (left) and American Frank Hunter (right), in a Davis Cup match in Berlin in 1929.

In 1930 he was a German Club team champion representing the Rot-Weiss Tennis Club of Berlin, beating fellow hometown club Blau-Weiss eight to one. Prenn won both of his doubles matches. He was runner-up at the Berlin international Championships, losing to Bill Tilden in the final. He also lost the doubles with his Davis Cup teammate Heinrich Kleinschroth to the duo of Tilden and Erik Worm. A month later they met again in a match for the Dutch Championships doubles title, although this time they formed a team and won against the Dutch champions Hendrik Timmer and Arthur Diemer Kool.

In 1931, he won the singles, doubles, and mixed doubles championships of the City of Dresden tournament. The same year he lost the Berlin International Championships the second time to Roderich Menzel in straight sets, but won the doubles partnering with him. He was a runner-up for the Danish Covered Court Championships in 1932, losing to Danish champion Einer Ulrich.

In the Davis Cup from 1928 through 1932, Prenn played 13 matches for Germany, winning 17 rubbers and losing 5, compiling a 73% winning record. He received the Reichsmedaille for winning the European Zone of the 1932 International Lawn Tennis Challenge, as the Davis Cup was then officially known.

He rose to the top of the German rankings starting from 1925 when he was ranked No. 15, in 1926 broke into the top ten at No. 10, in 1927 he was the fourth-best player in the country and from 1928 to 1932 he peaked the German tennis charts. In 1932, he was ranked as No. 6 in the world by A. Wallis Myers. The same year "American Lawn Tennis" magazine named him the European No. 1 player.

After he was banned from tennis in Germany because he was Jewish, he tried to apply for a Polish playing license to be part of the Poland Davis Cup team but was rejected by the Polski Związek Tenisowy (Polish Tennis Association), mainly as a result of his dismissal of previous Polish invitations and because he dropped his Polish citizenship earlier in 1932 to become a German citizen. He then moved to England and represented Great Britain in the 1933 Maccabiade in Prague, where he defeated Ladislav Hecht from Czechoslovakia in the final of the singles event.

After moving to Great Britain, he had a successive run in winning a series of tournaments in 1933, including the Scottish Lowland Championships against Antoine Gentien, the West of England Championships against Hendrik Timmer (also finalist in doubles) and the Paris Championships against Christian Boussus.

In 1934, he clinched the Surrey covered courts tournament in Dulwich after defeating American David Jones.

In 1935, he was the runner-up for the mixed doubles contest of the British Hard Court Championships with Evelyn Dearman. Unfortunately a flu prevented his partner from competing that day, and they had to default the match. He lost the Harrow tournament of London to Bunny Austin in straight sets, and the French Covered Court Championships to Jean Borotra. The same year he won the Surrey Hard Court Championships at Roehampton against South African player Pat Spence.

In 1937, he lost the Priory tournament final to Kho Sin-Kie.

== German Tennis Federation suspension and ban ==
In early 1931, he was accused of turning professional (meaning he broke the rule of amateurism) and was suspended from playing for a couple of months before being acquitted, when it turned out that he had been mistaken for another person named Danel Prenn Several months later the German Tennis Federation suspended him for another six months for sponsorship charges, based on the accusations of racquet manufacturer Hammer & Co. who claimed Prenn asked for payment for choosing Hammer's equipment. Local media labelled this action as anti-semitic, and it being forged by Hammer Company. As a result of his suspension Prenn's titles were taken back, as well as his amateur license. He was also expelled from the Germany Davis Cup team, though it didn't affect his presence as Germany was eliminated in the first round of the 1931 International Lawn Tennis Challenge

On 24 April 1933, a newly appointed Reichssportführer issued a declaration on behalf of the German Lawn Tennis Association stating that no Jew could be selected for the national team or the Davis Cup, and that no Jewish or Marxist club or association could be affiliated with the German Tennis Federation, and specifically that the Jewish player named Dr. Prenn would not be selected to the German Davis Cup team in 1933. The Swedish king, Gustaf V, a keen tennis player, dined with the German top brass in the summer of 1933, criticizing the new racial policies. After the lunch, the elderly king played a game with Prenn. Shortly thereafter, Prenn moved to Great Britain. In an open letter to The Times leading British players Fred Perry and Bunny Austin protested again Prenn's exclusion from the Davis Cup.

German Baron Gottfried von Cramm protested against the treatment of Prenn. Five years later, von Cramm was himself targeted and arrested on charges of homosexuality and imprisoned.

== Personal life after Germany ==
After moving to England he became a member of the prestigious Queen's Club as well as the Anglo-Russian Club in Chiswick. Prenn launched his own audio equipment company, Truvox Engineering, around 1935 in Kentish Town. From 1946 to 1949, he had five patents related to plastic molding. His company was sold to Racal in 1969 for $1.26 million. In 1970, he founded Celestion Electronics, a loudspeaker manufacturer.

In 1931 He married Charlotte Schmidt. Prenn became a British citizen in April 1940. They had two sons. Oliver (1937–2026) became a Wimbledon Junior Champion, and competed in the main Wimbledon competitions between 1956 and 1960. Oliver also took over the family enterprise in 1988. Another son, John Allen Nicholas (b. 1953), who was a World Champion of racquets in 1981, was also a shareholder in Lacoste, and as an avid supporter of tennis and squash he got Celestion involved in a racquet sponsoring venture, which ended in 2010. He still has an interest in or owns a dozen companies.

Daniel Prenn was inducted into the International Jewish Sports Hall of Fame in 1981.

== Grand Slam finals ==
=== Mixed doubles: (1 runner-up) ===
Result	Year	Championship	Surface	Partner	Opponents	Score
Loss	1930	Wimbledon	Grass	(Weimar Republic) Hilde Krahwinkel	(Australia) Jack Crawford (United States) Elizabeth Ryan	1–6, 3–6

== See also ==
- List of select Jewish tennis players
