= Violet Owen =

British tennis and field hockey player

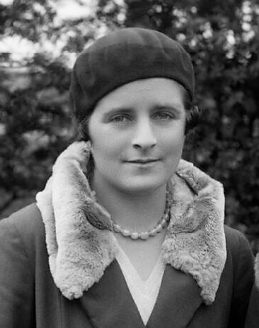
- Full name: Violet Chamberlain Owen
- Country (sports): United Kingdom
- Born: 15 February 1902 Ramsbury, Wiltshire, England
- Died: 22 October 1998 (aged 96)

Grand Slam singles results
- Wimbledon: 4R (1927, 1929)

Grand Slam doubles results
- Wimbledon: 3R (1928, 1930)

Grand Slam mixed doubles results
- Wimbledon: 3R (1930)

Violet Owen (15 February 1902 – 22 October 1998) was a British tennis and hockey player. She captained the British hockey team, and played at the Wimbledon tennis championships every year from 1926 to 1933, reaching eighth in the British rankings. She won the women's doubles at the British Hard Court Championships in 1927 partnering Agnes Tuckey. She was a runner-up in singles and doubles at the 1929 German Championships in Hamburg.

She was born Violet Chamberlain in Ramsbury, Wiltshire, on 15 February 1902. In 1930, she married Llewellyn Gordon Owen, also a notable sportsman, having played tennis at Wimbledon and football for Aston Villa and Wales.

They had three children, John, Geoffrey and Ann. Ann and Geoffrey both played at Wimbledon, and Geoffrey became editor of the Financial Times, was knighted in 1989, and later married literary editor Miriam Gross.
