= Stan Harris =

British Lions & English rugby union footballer, polo player and boxer (1894–1973)

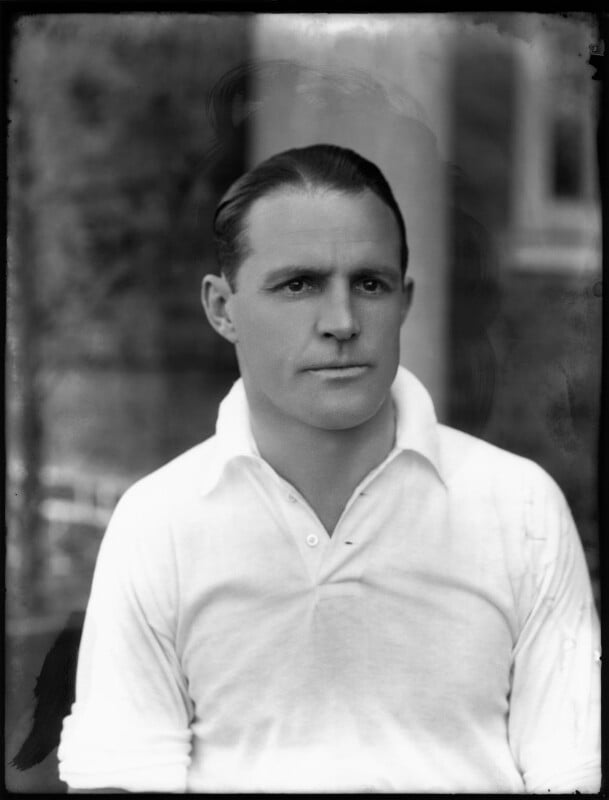
- Harris in 1929
- Born: Stanley Wakefield Harris; 13 December 1894 Somerset East, Cape Colony
- Died: 3 October 1973 (aged 78) Kenilworth, South Africa
- School: Bedford School

Rugby union career
- Position: Wing
Senior career
| Years | Team | Apps | (Points) |
- Blackheath F.C.
International career
| Years | Team | Apps | (Points) |
| 1920 | England | 2: | (3) |
| 1924 | British Lions | 2: | (3) |

Stanley Wakefield Harris CBE (13 December 1894 – 3 October 1973) was an English all-round sportsman regarded as one of the greatest all-rounders to have played for the British and Irish Lions. As a rugby union international, he represented England in 1920, and the British Lions in 1924. He also turned down a place in the Great Britain Olympic squad in 1920, became a South African boxing champion and represented England in polo, all in between serving in both the First and Second World Wars.

== Early life ==
Stan Harris was born on 13 December 1894 in Somerset East. He attended Bedford School where he excelled at rugby union.

== Sporting career ==
Stanley Harris has been described as a "Boy’s Own" hero for his sporting prowess. After his service in World War I, in which he was wounded, he spent some time convalescing, but his boredom at this predicament led him to take up ballroom dancing. A year later he reached the finals of the World Ballroom dancing championship, in which he won the waltz section.

After being sufficiently healed, he returned to his school boy passion of rugby union and became the leading try-scorer for Blackheath F.C. and also played for East Midlands RFC. Having played in the trial match in December 1919 on the victorious side where The South beat England, he made his international debut on 14 February 1920 at Lansdowne Road in the Ireland vs England match under the captaincy of Jenny Greenwood. He then also played against Scotland that season, scoring a try in that second match winning the Calcutta Cup and helping England secure a joint Five Nations championship (along with Scotland and Wales). In 1920, he also turned down a place in the Great Britain Olympic modern pentathlon team in 1920 to play rugby. He emigrated to South Africa soon afterwards and played for the Johannesburg Pirates club, as well as Transvaal.

In 1921 he became the South African light-heavyweight boxing champion. In 1924, when the British Lions toured South Africa, he was called up by the team and played two Tests. Originally chosen as a replacement wing he then took over as fullback after a spate of injuries to the touring party. He played his final match for the British Lions on 20 Sep 1924 at Newlands Stadium and scored a try in that final match that was rated as the best of the series. The Springbok captain, Pierre Albertyn, rated Harris as the pick of the Lions backs.

Harris then remained in South Africa until the beginning of the Second World War and won Springbok colours both in tennis and boxing.

== Military career ==
Harris served in two world wars. He began his service as a trooper in the Imperial Light Horse, in South West Africa from 1914 to 1915. He was commissioned in the Royal Field Artillery in 1915 and fought in France, and was severely wounded during the Battle of the Somme in 1916. He returned to active duty to serve in both Flanders and North Russia.

In between wars he was a member of the Army Sports Control Board 1935-1939 and took up service again in 1939. Harris was second-in-command of the 148th (Bedfordshire Yeomanry) Field Artillery Regiment sent to help defend Singapore in January 1942. He became a prisoner of war of the Japanese in Singapore and Siam for the next 3 1/2 years. Harris was also promoted to lieutenant-colonel and commanding officer of the Bedfordshire Yeomanry in captivity when the regiment's previous CO was killed trying to escape from Singapore.

In April 1943 Harris was appointed senior officer in command of F Force a forced labour party of 7000 prisoners, with Lieutenant Colonel Dillon leader of the British and Lieutenant Colonel Kappe Leader of the Australians. These men were sent by rail to Non Pluduc during the latter part of April 1943. They were to suffer among the highest casualties of any POW group. Due to remaining under the control of the Malay Command, rather than the Thai-Burma Command, they suffered in the distribution of supplies. They were also forced marched for roughly 300 kilometres to their work area near the Burma border. To compound already dreadful conditions was a cholera epidemic, which struck during the wet season. Of the 3336 British in F Force 2037 of them died, whilst the Australians lost 1060 men. On many occasions Harris was known to have stood up for his men, on one occasion preventing 700 of his wounded soldiers being simply left in the jungle outside the camp.

== Later life ==
Harris was awarded the CBE in 1946. He married Leila Mary Roberts in Cape Town and lived in Kenilworth with her children, Peter Graham Roberts, Sally Jane Roberts and Mark Archer Roberts. He died in 1973 at Cape Town.
