= Joan Austin =

British tennis player

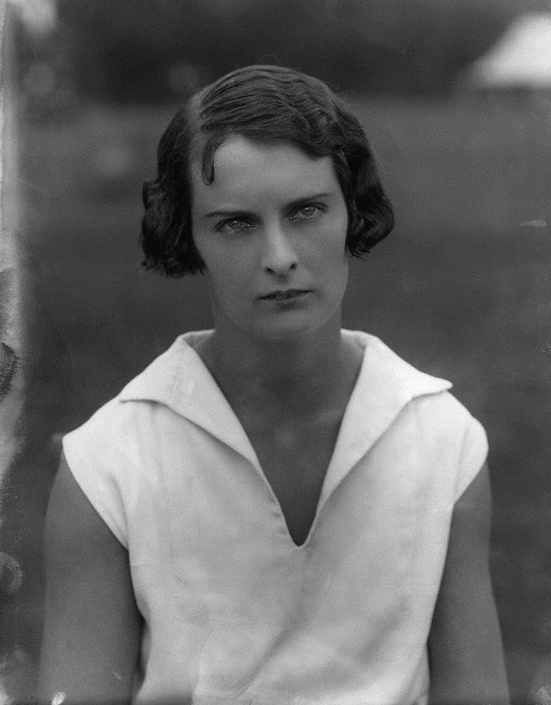
- Full name: Joan Winifred Austin (married name Lycett)
- Country (sports): United Kingdom
- Born: 23 January 1903; London, England
- Died: 2 April 1998 (aged 95); Horley, England

Singles

Grand Slam singles results
- French Open: 2R (1928)
- Wimbledon: 3R (1923, 1927, 1929)

Doubles

Grand Slam doubles results
- French Open: SF (1928)
- Wimbledon: F (1923)

Grand Slam mixed doubles results
- French Open: QF (1928)
- Wimbledon: SF (1925)

Team competitions
- Wightman Cup: W (1924, 1925)

Joan Winifred Austin (later Lycett, 23 January 1903 – 2 April 1998) was a British female tennis player who was also known as one of "The Babes".

== Early life ==
23 January 1903, Austin was born in London, England. Austin's brother was Bunny Austin, a Wimbledon finalist. Austin attended Winchester School for Girls. Austin was taught tennis by her father.

== Career ==
Austin won the singles title at the Junior Championships of Great Britain in 1920 and 1921.

Partnering with Evelyn Colyer she played doubles in the 1923 Wimbledon tournament and reached the final against Suzanne Lenglen and Elizabeth Ryan but lost in straight sets. Colyer and Austin were known in the British press as "The Babes."

Between 1923 and 1932 she competed in nine editions of the Wimbledon Championships. Her best singles result was reaching the third round in 1923, 1927 and 1929.

In June 1925 Austin and her husband teamed up in the mixed doubles event at Wimbledon and reached the semifinal which they lost in three sets to Suzanne Lenglen and Jean Borotra.

In November 1934 Austin became a professional tennis coach.

== Personal life ==
12 February 1925, Austin married Randolph Lycett, a tennis player. In August 1926, Austin had a daughter.

== Grand Slam finals ==
=== Doubles: (1 runners-up) ===
Result	Year	Championship	Surface	Partner	Opponents	Score
Loss	1923	Wimbledon	Grass	(United Kingdom) Evelyn Colyer	(France) Suzanne Lenglen (United States) Elizabeth Ryan	3–6, 1–6
