= 1927 Wimbledon Championships – Women's doubles =

Women's doubles
- 1927 Wimbledon Championships

Final
- Champions: (United States) Elizabeth Ryan (United States) Helen Wills
- Runners-up: (South Africa) Bobbie Heine (South Africa) Irene Peacock
- Score: 6–3, 6–2

Details
- Draw: 42 (5Q)
- Seeds: 4

Events
Singles	men	women		boys	girls
Doubles	men	women	mixed	boys	girls
- Wimbledon Championships

Mary Browne and Elizabeth Ryan were the defending champions, but Browne did not participate. Ryan partnered with Helen Wills, and defeated Bobbie Heine and Irene Peacock in the final, 6–3, 6–2 to win the ladies' doubles tennis title at the 1927 Wimbledon Championships.

== Seeds ==
1. (South Africa) Bobbie Heine / (South Africa) Irene Peacock (final)
2. (United States) Elizabeth Ryan / (United States) Helen Wills (champions)
3. (United Kingdom) Kitty Godfree / (United Kingdom) Betty Nuthall (semifinals)
4. (United Kingdom) Ermyntrude Harvey / (United Kingdom) Mary McIlquham (semifinals)

Click on the seed number of a player to go to their draw section.

== Draw ==
Key

- Q = Qualifier
- WC = Wild card
- LL = Lucky loser
- Alt = Alternate
- ITF = ITF entry
- PR = Protected ranking
- SR = Special ranking
- SE = Special exempt
- JE = Junior exempt
- JR = Junior Accelerator Programme entrant
- CO = College Accelerator Programme entrant
- NG = Next Gen Accelerator Program entrant
- w/o = Walkover
- r = Retired
- d = Defaulted

=== Finals ===
Quarterfinals
1	(South Africa) Bobbie Heine (South Africa) Irene Peacock	6	6
(United Kingdom) Winifred Beamish (United Kingdom) Enid Clarke	1	0
4	(United Kingdom) Ermyntrude Harvey (United Kingdom) Mary McIlquham	6	6
(France) Marguerite Bordes (France) Simonne Mathieu	3	2
2	(United States) Elizabeth Ryan (United States) Helen Wills	6	6
(United Kingdom) Elsie Goldsack (United Kingdom) Phoebe Watson	2	2
3	(United Kingdom) Kitty Godfree (United Kingdom) Betty Nuthall	3	6	6
(United Kingdom) Joan Fry (United Kingdom) Peggy Saunders	6	2	1

Semifinals
1	(South Africa) Bobbie Heine (South Africa) Irene Peacock	5	6	6
4	(United Kingdom) Ermyntrude Harvey (United Kingdom) Mary McIlquham	7	2	1
2	(United States) Elizabeth Ryan (United States) Helen Wills	6	6
3	(United Kingdom) Kitty Godfree (United Kingdom) Betty Nuthall	2	2

Final
1	(South Africa) Bobbie Heine (South Africa) Irene Peacock	3	2
2	(United States) Elizabeth Ryan (United States) Helen Wills	6	6

=== Top half ===
==== Section 1 ====
First round

Second round
1	(South Africa) Bobbie Heine (South Africa) Irene Peacock	6	6
(United Kingdom) JL Colegate (United Kingdom) CJ Tyrrell	3	3
Q	(United Kingdom) Mary Davies (United Kingdom) Davinia Gordon	4	3
(Netherlands) Kea Bouman (United Kingdom) Phyllis Satterthwaite	6	6
(United Kingdom) Winifred Beamish (United Kingdom) Enid Clarke	6	7
(United Kingdom) Cecily Marriott (United Kingdom) Madge Slaney	1	5
(United Kingdom) Kate Anningson (United Kingdom) GJ Gilder	3	6
Mrs DM Evans (Republic of Ireland) Mrs RRW Jackson	6	8

Third round
1	(South Africa) E Heine (South Africa) I Peacock	6	6
(Netherlands) K Bouman (United Kingdom) P Satterthwaite	0	1
(United Kingdom) W Beamish (United Kingdom) E Clarke	6	7
Mrs DM Evans (Republic of Ireland) Mrs RRW Jackson	0	5

Quarterfinals
1	(South Africa) E Heine (South Africa) I Peacock	6	6
(United Kingdom) W Beamish (United Kingdom) E Clarke	1	0

The nationality of Mrs DM Evans is unknown.

==== Section 2 ====
First round
(France) Genevieve Cousin (United Kingdom) Evelyn Dearman	6	3
Q	(United Kingdom) Sybil Johnson (United Kingdom) Eleanor Rose	8	6
(France) Marguerite Bordes (France) Simonne Mathieu	6	4	6
(United Kingdom) Christabel Hardie (United Kingdom) Dorothy Shaw	2	6	3
(United Kingdom) Violet Chamberlain (United Kingdom) Agnes Tuckey	6	6
(United Kingdom) Joyce Brown (France) Violette Gallay	3	0
(United Kingdom) Dorothea Lambert Chambers (South Africa) Billie Tapscott	6	6
Q	(United Kingdom) Beatrice Brown (United Kingdom) Doreen Busby	2	3
(United Kingdom) Margaret Stocks (United Kingdom) Vera Youle	3	6	3
(United Kingdom) Enid Broadbridge (United Kingdom) Irene Maltby	6	2	6

Second round
4	(United Kingdom) Ermyntrude Harvey (United Kingdom) Mary McIlquham	6	6
(United Kingdom) Eileen Bennett (United Kingdom) Dorothy Hill	4	2
(United Kingdom) Peggy Pleydell-Bouverie (United Kingdom) Joan Ridley	2	3
Q	(United Kingdom) S Johnson (United Kingdom) E Rose	6	6
(France) M Bordes (France) S Mathieu	7	6
(United Kingdom) V Chamberlain (United Kingdom) A Tuckey	5	4
(United Kingdom) D Lambert Chambers (South Africa) D Tapscott	6	4	1
(United Kingdom) E Broadbridge (United Kingdom) I Maltby	0	6	6

Third round
4	(United Kingdom) E Harvey (United Kingdom) M McIlquham	6	10
Q	(United Kingdom) S Johnson (United Kingdom) E Rose	3	8
(France) M Bordes (France) S Mathieu	6	1	8
(United Kingdom) E Broadbridge (United Kingdom) I Maltby	1	6	6

Quarterfinals
4	(United Kingdom) E Harvey (United Kingdom) M McIlquham	6	6
(France) M Bordes (France) S Mathieu	3	2

=== Bottom half ===
==== Section 3 ====
First round
2	(United States) Elizabeth Ryan (United States) Helen Wills	6	6
(United Kingdom) Molly Welsh (United Kingdom) Phyllis Whitley	3	2
(United Kingdom) Phyllis Covell (United Kingdom) Gwen Sterry	6	7
(United Kingdom) Kathleen Bridge (United Kingdom) Marie Hazel	1	5
Q	(United Kingdom) Mary Burgess-Smith (United Kingdom) CI Kalber
(United Kingdom) Sylvia Lumley-Ellis (Germany) Paula von Reznicek	w/o
(United Kingdom) Peggy Dransfield (United Kingdom) Hazel Hogarth	6	6
(United Kingdom) E Phayre (United Kingdom) MK Phayre	4	1
(United Kingdom) Dorothy Alexander (United Kingdom) Mabel Mavrogordato	6	6
(United States) Florence Ballin (South Africa) Mrs MF Ellis	2	2

Second round
2	(United States) E Ryan (United States) H Wills	6	6
(United Kingdom) P Covell (United Kingdom) G Sterry	2	3
Q	(United Kingdom) M Burgess-Smith (United Kingdom) CI Kalber	0	6	5
(United Kingdom) P Dransfield (United Kingdom) H Hogarth	6	1	7
(United Kingdom) D Alexander (United Kingdom) M Mavrogordato	8	5	6
(United Kingdom) Mrs Bruce-May (United Kingdom) Madge Valantine	6	7	3
(United Kingdom) CP Brocklesby; Mrs JH King	2	3
(United Kingdom) Elsie Goldsack (United Kingdom) Phoebe Watson	6	6

Third round
2	(United States) E Ryan (United States) H Wills	6	6
(United Kingdom) P Dransfield (United Kingdom) H Hogarth	2	1
(United Kingdom) D Alexander (United Kingdom) M Mavrogordato	3	3
(United Kingdom) E Goldsack (United Kingdom) P Watson	6	6

Quarterfinals
2	(United States) E Ryan (United States) H Wills	6	6
(United Kingdom) E Goldsack (United Kingdom) P Watson	2	2

The nationality of Mrs JH King is unknown.

==== Section 4 ====
First round

Second round
3	(United Kingdom) Kitty Godfree (United Kingdom) Betty Nuthall	6	6
(United Kingdom) NQ Radcliffe-Platt (United Kingdom) PM Radcliffe	3	0
(United Kingdom) Evelyn Colyer (United Kingdom) Joan Lycett
(United Kingdom) Aurea Edgington (United Kingdom) Dorothy Holman	w/o
(United Kingdom) Claire Beckingham (France) Elizabeth Macready	3	6	10
(United Kingdom) Betty Dix (United Kingdom) R Watson	6	1	8
(Germany) Cilly Aussem (Germany) Ilse Friedleben	0	1
(United Kingdom) Joan Fry (United Kingdom) Peggy Saunders	6	6

Third round
3	(United Kingdom) K Godfree (United Kingdom) B Nuthall	6	6
(United Kingdom) E Colyer (United Kingdom) J Lycett	3	3
(United Kingdom) C Beckingham (France) E Macready	3	3
(United Kingdom) J Fry (United Kingdom) M Saunders	6	6

Quarterfinals
3	(United Kingdom) K Godfree (United Kingdom) B Nuthall	3	6	6
(United Kingdom) J Fry (United Kingdom) M Saunders	6	2	1
