= 1927 Wimbledon Championships – Mixed doubles =

Mixed doubles
- 1927 Wimbledon Championships

Final
- Champions: (United States) Frank Hunter (United States) Elizabeth Ryan
- Runners-up: (United Kingdom) Leslie Godfree (United Kingdom) Kitty Godfree
- Score: 8–6, 6–0

Details
- Draw: 64 (5 Q )
- Seeds: 4

Events
Singles	men	women		boys	girls
Doubles	men	women	mixed	boys	girls
← 1926 ·	Wimbledon Championships	· 1928 →

Frank Hunter and Elizabeth Ryan defeated the defending champions Leslie Godfree and Kitty Godfree in the final, 8–6, 6–0 to win the mixed doubles tennis title at the 1927 Wimbledon Championships.

== Seeds ==
1. (United Kingdom) Leslie Godfree / (United Kingdom) Kitty Godfree (final)
2. (France) Jean Borotra / (France) Marguerite Bordes (second round)
3. (United States) Frank Hunter / (United States) Elizabeth Ryan (champions)
4. (United States) Bill Tilden / (United States) Molla Mallory (second round)

Click on the seed number of a player to go to their draw section.

== Draw ==
=== Key ===
- Q = Qualifier
- WC = Wild card
- LL = Lucky loser
- Alt = Alternate
- SE = Special exempt
- PR = Protected ranking
- ITF = ITF entry
- JE = Junior exempt
- w/o = Walkover
- r = Retired
- d = Defaulted
- SR = Special ranking

=== Finals ===
Quarterfinals
1	(United Kingdom) Leslie Godfree (United Kingdom) Kitty Godfree	6	6
(South Africa) Jack Condon (South Africa) Irene Peacock	4	4
(Hungary) Béla von Kehrling (United Kingdom) Eileen Bennett	5	4
(United Kingdom) Donald Greig (United Kingdom) Phoebe Watson	7	6
(United Kingdom) Charles Kingsley (United Kingdom) Dorothy Hill	4	5
(South Africa) Louis Raymond (South Africa) Bobbie Heine	6	7
3	(United States) Frank Hunter (United States) Elizabeth Ryan	6	6
(United Kingdom) Randolph Lycett (United Kingdom) Joan Lycett	3	2

Semifinals
1	(United Kingdom) Leslie Godfree (United Kingdom) Kitty Godfree	6	6
(United Kingdom) Donald Greig (United Kingdom) Phoebe Watson	3	4
(South Africa) Louis Raymond (South Africa) Bobbie Heine	3	4
3	(United States) Frank Hunter (United States) Elizabeth Ryan	6	6

Final
1	(United Kingdom) Leslie Godfree (United Kingdom) Kitty Godfree	6	0
3	(United States) Frank Hunter (United States) Elizabeth Ryan	8	6

=== Top half ===
==== Section 1 ====
First round
1	(United Kingdom) Leslie Godfree (United Kingdom) Kitty Godfree	6	6
(Netherlands) Cornelis Bryan (United Kingdom) Kathleen Bridge	4	4
(United Kingdom) Douglas Hodges (United Kingdom) JL Colegate	6	6
(Romania) Nicolae Mișu (United Kingdom) Hazel Hogarth	1	2
Q	(United Kingdom) Fassett Burnett (United Kingdom) Cecily Marriott	1	3
(United Kingdom) Colin Gregory (United Kingdom) Ermyntrude Harvey	6	6
(France) Pierre Henri Landry (France) Genevieve Cousin	6	4	6
(Canada) Henry Mayes (Greece) Hélène Contostavlos	0	6	4
(South Africa) Jack Condon (South Africa) Irene Peacock
(New Zealand) Frank Fisher (United Kingdom) Beatrice Brown	w/o
(United Kingdom) Eric Peters (United Kingdom) Madge Slaney	3	6	6
(United Kingdom) JG Hogan (United Kingdom) Marie Hazel	6	4	4
(United Kingdom) Billy Collins (United Kingdom) Betty Dix	6	3	3
(South Africa) Norman Farquharson (South Africa) Billie Tapscott	1	6	6
(Netherlands) Hendrik Timmer (Netherlands) Kea Bouman	2	6	4
(France) Jacques Brugnon (United Kingdom) Evelyn Colyer	6	4	6

Second round
1	(United Kingdom) L Godfree (United Kingdom) K Godfree	2	6	6
(United Kingdom) D Hodges (United Kingdom) JL Colegate	6	3	3
(United Kingdom) C Gregory (United Kingdom) E Harvey	6	8
(France) PH Landry (France) G Cousin	4	6
(South Africa) J Condon (South Africa) I Peacock
(United Kingdom) E Peters (United Kingdom) M Slaney	w/o
(South Africa) N Farquharson (South Africa) D Tapscott	6	4
(France) J Brugnon (United Kingdom) E Colyer	8	6

Third round
1	(United Kingdom) L Godfree (United Kingdom) K Godfree	6	6
(United Kingdom) C Gregory (United Kingdom) E Harvey	4	4
(South Africa) J Condon (South Africa) I Peacock	6	3	6
(France) J Brugnon (United Kingdom) E Colyer	4	6	3

Quarterfinals
1	(United Kingdom) L Godfree (United Kingdom) K Godfree	6	6
(South Africa) J Condon (South Africa) I Peacock	4	4

==== Section 2 ====
First round
4	(United States) Bill Tilden (United States) Molla Mallory	6	8
(United Kingdom) Ian Collins (United Kingdom) Joan Fry	2	6
(Republic of Ireland) St John Mahony (Republic of Ireland) Mrs RRW Jackson	3	6
(Hungary) Béla von Kehrling (United Kingdom) Eileen Bennett	6	8
(South Africa) Gerald Sherwell (United Kingdom) Madge Valantine	6	6
(United Kingdom) Clinton McIlquham (United Kingdom) Mary McIlquham	4	4
Q	(United Kingdom) Norman Latchford (United Kingdom) Mary Davies	2	2
(France) Christian Boussus (France) Simonne Mathieu	6	6
(Germany) Oscar Kreuzer (Germany) Ilse Friedleben	12	4	6
(United Kingdom) RDN Pryce-Jones (United Kingdom) Irene Maltby	10	6	2
(France) Antoine Gentien (France) Violette Gallay	0	2
(United Kingdom) Henry Standring (United Kingdom) E Phayre	6	6
(United Kingdom) Donald Greig (United Kingdom) Phoebe Watson	6	6
(Czechoslovakia) Ernst Gottlieb (United Kingdom) Dorothy Shaw	1	1
(India) Sydney Jacob (United Kingdom) Violet Chamberlain	2	6	6
LL	(United Kingdom) Alfred Ingram (United Kingdom) Peggy Pleydell-Bouverie	6	2	3

Second round
4	(United States) W Tilden (United States) M Mallory	6	1	4
(Hungary) B von Kehrling (United Kingdom) E Bennett	3	6	6
(South Africa) G Sherwell (United Kingdom) M Valantine	6	6
(France) C Boussus (France) S Mathieu	3	4
(Germany) O Kreuzer (Germany) I Friedleben	4	3
(United Kingdom) H Standring (United Kingdom) E Phayre	6	6
(United Kingdom) D Greig (United Kingdom) P Watson
(India) S Jacob (United Kingdom) V Chamberlain	w/o

Third round
(Hungary) B von Kehrling (United Kingdom) E Bennett	6	6
(South Africa) G Sherwell (United Kingdom) M Valantine	3	4
(United Kingdom) H Standring (United Kingdom) E Phayre	1	1
(United Kingdom) D Greig (United Kingdom) P Watson	6	6

Quarterfinals
(Hungary) B von Kehrling (United Kingdom) E Bennett	5	4
(United Kingdom) D Greig (United Kingdom) P Watson	7	6

=== Bottom half ===
==== Section 3 ====
First round
2	(France) Jean Borotra (France) Marguerite Bordes	4	6	6
(United Kingdom) Jack Hillyard (United Kingdom) Phyllis Satterthwaite	6	3	1
(Czechoslovakia) Jan Koželuh (Germany) Paula von Reznicek	w/o
(United Kingdom) Bunny Austin (United Kingdom) Betty Nuthall
(United Kingdom) Cyril Eames (United Kingdom) Winifred Beamish	6	6
(United Kingdom) JE Pogson-Smith (United Kingdom) Enid Clarke	1	3
(United Kingdom) William Radcliffe (United Kingdom) Eleanor Rose	8	2	3
(United Kingdom) Charles Kingsley (United Kingdom) Dorothy Hill	6	6	6
(United Kingdom) DM Evans; Mrs DM Evans	12	6
Q	(United Kingdom) Eric Hollins (United Kingdom) EG Newton	10	4
(United Kingdom) Pat Hughes (United Kingdom) Joan Ridley	6	6
Q	(United Kingdom) Andrew Stocks (United Kingdom) Margaret Stocks	3	1
(South Africa) Louis Raymond (South Africa) Bobbie Heine	6	6
(United Kingdom) Teddy Higgs (United Kingdom) Phyllis Covell	4	4
(United Kingdom) Maurice Summerson (United Kingdom) R Watson	6	1	5
(United States) Watson Washburn (United Kingdom) NQ Radcliffe-Platt	2	6	7

Second round
2	(France) J Borotra (France) M Bordes	4	7
(United Kingdom) H Austin (United Kingdom) B Nuthall	6	9
(United Kingdom) C Eames (United Kingdom) W Beamish	1	9	4
(United Kingdom) C Kingsley (United Kingdom) D Hill	6	7	6
(United Kingdom) DM Evans; Mrs DM Evans	5	7	4
(United Kingdom) P Hughes (United Kingdom) J Ridley	7	5	6
(South Africa) L Raymond (South Africa) E Heine	6	6
(United States) W Washburn (United Kingdom) NQ Radcliffe-Platt	4	1

Third round
(United Kingdom) H Austin (United Kingdom) B Nuthall	4	6	4
(United Kingdom) C Kingsley (United Kingdom) D Hill	6	4	6
(United Kingdom) P Hughes (United Kingdom) J Ridley	2	6	2
(South Africa) L Raymond (South Africa) E Heine	6	2	6

Quarterfinals
(United Kingdom) C Kingsley (United Kingdom) D Hill	4	5
(South Africa) L Raymond (South Africa) E Heine	6	7

The nationality of Mrs DM Evans is unknown.

==== Section 4 ====
First round
3	(United States) Francis Hunter (United States) Elizabeth Ryan	8	6
(United Kingdom) Gordon Crole-Rees (United Kingdom) D Haydon	6	3
(United Kingdom) Keats Lester (United Kingdom) Sylvia Lumley-Ellis	9	6	2
(United Kingdom) Theodore Mavrogordato (United Kingdom) Dorothy Alexander	11	3	6
(United Kingdom) Arthur Berger (United Kingdom) Dorothea Lambert Chambers	6	6
(United Kingdom) Roy Poland (United Kingdom) CJ Tyrrell	3	3
(United Kingdom) Brian Gilbert (United Kingdom) Gwen Sterry	w/o
(United Kingdom) Harvey Mackintosh (United Kingdom) Elsa Haylock
(United Kingdom) WB Stott (United Kingdom) Elsie Goldsack	6	3	6
(United Kingdom) St John Evers (United Kingdom) Mabel Mavrogordato	3	6	3
(Germany) Heinrich Kleinschroth (Germany) Cilly Aussem	3	2
(United Kingdom) Randolph Lycett (United Kingdom) Joan Lycett	6	6
(United Kingdom) Lewis Michell (United Kingdom) Peggy Saunders
(Republic of Ireland) AE Browne (United Kingdom) Claire Beckingham	w/o
Q	(United Kingdom) Edward Dearman (United Kingdom) Evelyn Dearman	6	6
(United Kingdom) Bill Swinden (United Kingdom) Mrs Bruce-May	2	2

Second round
3	(United States) F Hunter (United States) E Ryan	6	6
(United Kingdom) T Mavrogordato (United Kingdom) D Alexander	1	2
(United Kingdom) A Berger (United Kingdom) D Lambert Chambers	6	6
(United Kingdom) H Mackintosh (United Kingdom) E Haylock	2	4
(United Kingdom) WB Stott (United Kingdom) E Goldsack	1	2
(United Kingdom) R Lycett (United Kingdom) J Lycett	6	6
(United Kingdom) L Michell (United Kingdom) M Saunders	6	6
Q	(United Kingdom) E Dearman (United Kingdom) E Dearman	4	3

Third round
3	(United States) F Hunter (United States) E Ryan	6	8
(United Kingdom) A Berger (United Kingdom) D Lambert Chambers	1	6
(United Kingdom) R Lycett (United Kingdom) J Lycett	6	6
(United Kingdom) L Michell (United Kingdom) M Saunders	2	2

Quarterfinals
3	(United States) F Hunter (United States) E Ryan	6	6
(United Kingdom) R Lycett (United Kingdom) J Lycett	3	2
