= 1927 Wimbledon Championships – Women's singles =

Women's singles
- 1927 Wimbledon Championships

Final
- Champion: (United States) Helen Wills
- Runner-up: (Spain) Lilí de Álvarez
- Score: 6–2, 6–4

Details
- Draw: 80 (10Q)
- Seeds: 8

Events
Singles	men	women		boys	girls
Doubles	men	women	mixed	boys	girls
- Wimbledon Championships

First-seeded Helen Wills defeated Lilí de Álvarez 6–2, 6–4 to win the ladies' singles tennis title at the 1927 Wimbledon Championships.

Kitty Godfree was the defending champion, but lost to Elizabeth Ryan in the quarterfinals.

== Seeds ==
1. (United States) Helen Wills (champion)
2. (United Kingdom) Kitty Godfree (quarterfinals)
3. (Netherlands) Kea Bouman (fourth round)
4. (Spain) Lili de Álvarez (final)
5. (United States) Elizabeth Ryan (semifinals)
6. (United States) Molla Mallory (third round)
7. (South Africa) Bobbie Heine (third round)
8. (South Africa) Irene Peacock (quarterfinals)

Click on the seed number of a player to go to their draw section.

== Draw ==
Key

- Q = Qualifier
- WC = Wild card
- LL = Lucky loser
- Alt = Alternate
- ITF = ITF entry
- PR = Protected ranking
- SR = Special ranking
- SE = Special exempt
- JE = Junior exempt
- JR = Junior Accelerator Programme entrant
- CO = College Accelerator Programme entrant
- NG = Next Gen Accelerator Program entrant
- w/o = Walkover
- r = Retired
- d = Defaulted

=== Finals ===
Quarterfinals
2	(United Kingdom) Kitty Godfree	6	4	4
5	(United States) Elizabeth Ryan	3	6	6
4	(Spain) Lilí de Álvarez	6	3	8
(United Kingdom) Phoebe Watson	3	6	6
1	(United States) Helen Wills	6	6
8	(South Africa) Irene Peacock	3	1
(United Kingdom) Joan Fry	1	6	6
(United Kingdom) Betty Nuthall	6	3	4

Semifinals
5	(United States) Elizabeth Ryan	6	0	4
4	(Spain) Lilí de Álvarez	2	6	6
1	(United States) Helen Wills	6	6
(United Kingdom) Joan Fry	3	1

Final
4	(Spain) Lilí de Álvarez	2	4
1	(United States) Helen Wills	6	6

=== Top half ===
==== Section 1 ====
First round

Second round
2	(United Kingdom) Kitty Godfree	6	6
Q	(United Kingdom) Naomi Trentham	2	2
(South Africa) Billie Tapscott	7	6
(France) G Cousin	5	4
(United Kingdom) Evelyn Colyer	6	6	7
(United Kingdom) Phyllis Satterthwaite	8	2	5
(France) Marguerite Bordes	0	5
(United Kingdom) Joan Ridley	6	7

Third round
2	(United Kingdom) K Godfree	6	10
(South Africa) D Tapscott	2	8
(United Kingdom) E Colyer	6	6
(United Kingdom) J Ridley	4	3

Fourth round
2	(United Kingdom) K Godfree	6	6
(United Kingdom) E Colyer	2	2

==== Section 2 ====
First round

Second round
5	(United States) Elizabeth Ryan	6	6
Q	(United Kingdom) Eileen Connell	2	4
(New Zealand) Marjorie MacFarlane	3	4
(United Kingdom) Enid Broadbridge	6	6
(United Kingdom) Ermyntrude Harvey	6	8
(Germany) Ilse Friedleben	4	6
(Greece) Hélène Contostavlos	6	6
(United Kingdom) Dorothy Alexander	1	1

Third round
(United States) E Ryan	6	6
(United Kingdom) E Broadbridge	2	3
(United Kingdom) E Harvey	6	6
(Greece) H Contostavlos	4	4

Fourth round
5	(United States) E Ryan	7	6
(United Kingdom) E Harvey	5	1

==== Section 3 ====
First round

Second round
4	(Spain) Lilí de Álvarez	6	6
(United Kingdom) Mrs MB Reckitt	2	3
(United Kingdom) Peggy Dransfield	6	6
(France) Violette Gallay	4	1
(United Kingdom) E Norman	4	4
(United Kingdom) Mabel Mavrogordato	6	6
(United Kingdom) JL Colegate	4	3
(United Kingdom) Madge Valantine	6	6

Third round
4	(Spain) E de Álvarez	6	6
(United Kingdom) P Dransfield	0	4
(United Kingdom) M Mavrogordato	9	6	6
(United Kingdom) M Valantine	11	4	4

Fourth round
4	(Spain) E de Álvarez	6	6
(United Kingdom) M Mavrogordato	3	0

==== Section 4 ====
First round
7	(South Africa) Bobbie Heine	6	3	6
(United Kingdom) Eleanor Rose	4	6	4
Q	(United Kingdom) Winifred Bower	7	2	0
Q	(United Kingdom) Effie Hemmant	5	6	6
(Republic of Ireland) Mrs RRW Jackson	6	6
(United Kingdom) Doris Craddock	3	1
(Germany) Paula von Reznicek
(United Kingdom) Phoebe Watson	w/o
(United Kingdom) GJ Gilder	3	2
(United Kingdom) Violet Chamberlain	6	6
(United Kingdom) Madge Slaney	9	3	1
(France) Elizabeth Macready	7	6	6
(United Kingdom) Mrs Bruce-May	6	3	1
(United Kingdom) CJ Tyrrell	2	6	6
Q	(United Kingdom) Sybil Johnson	2	6	3
(United Kingdom) Kathleen Bridge	6	0	6

Second round
7	(South Africa) E Heine	6	6
Q	(United Kingdom) E Hemmant	3	2
(Republic of Ireland) Mrs RRW Jackson	0	2
(United Kingdom) P Watson	6	6
(United Kingdom) V Chamberlain	6	6
(France) E Macready	3	2
(United Kingdom) CJ Tyrrell	6	6
(United Kingdom) K Bridge	2	1

Third round
7	(South Africa) E Heine	6	3	5
(United Kingdom) P Watson	4	6	7
(United Kingdom) V Chamberlain	6	1	6
(United Kingdom) CJ Tyrrell	2	6	4

Fourth round
(United Kingdom) P Watson	6	7
(United Kingdom) V Chamberlain	1	5

=== Bottom half ===
==== Section 5 ====
First round
1	(United States) Helen Wills	6	3	6
(United Kingdom) Gwen Sterry	3	6	3
(United Kingdom) Sylvia Lumley-Ellis	6	6
(United Kingdom) Cecily Marriott	3	2
(United Kingdom) Margaret Stocks	3	2
(United Kingdom) Christabel Hardie	6	6
(United Kingdom) Eileen Bennett	7	6
(United Kingdom) Agnes Tuckey	5	4
(United Kingdom) Davinia Gordon	6	6
(United Kingdom) Joyce Brown	3	2
(United Kingdom) R Watson	3	0
(United Kingdom) Elsie Goldsack	6	6
(United Kingdom) Mary McIlquham	6	0	4
(United Kingdom) Joan Lycett	1	6	6
(United Kingdom) DE Munro	1	1
(United Kingdom) Winifred Beamish	6	6

Second round
1	(United States) H Wills	6	6
(United Kingdom) S Lumley-Ellis	3	2
(United Kingdom) C Hardie	4	6	2
(United Kingdom) E Bennett	6	3	6
(United Kingdom) D Gordon	3	4
(United Kingdom) E Goldsack	6	6
(United Kingdom) J Lycett	6	6
(United Kingdom) W Beamish	4	3

Third round
1	(United States) H Wills	7	6
(United Kingdom) E Bennett	5	3
(United Kingdom) E Goldsack	6	8	6
(United Kingdom) J Lycett	8	6	3

Fourth round
1	(United States) H Wills	6	6
(United Kingdom) E Goldsack	1	3

==== Section 6 ====
First round

Second round
8	(South Africa) Irene Peacock	6	6
Q	(United Kingdom) Beatrice Feltham	0	1
(United Kingdom) Enid Clarke	6	6
Q	(United Kingdom) Mary Davies	2	3
(United Kingdom) Irene Maltby	6	2	6
(United Kingdom) Elsa Haylock	1	6	3
(United Kingdom) Aurea Edgington	7	3	6
(United Kingdom) Claire Beckingham	5	6	4

Third round
8	(South Africa) I Peacock	6	6
(United Kingdom) E Clarke	3	1
(United Kingdom) I Maltby	3	6	6
(United Kingdom) A Edgington	6	4	4

Fourth round
8	(South Africa) I Peacock	6	6
(United Kingdom) I Maltby	3	2

==== Section 7 ====
First round

Second round
3	(Netherlands) Kea Bouman	6	6
Q	(United Kingdom) Doreen Busby	0	3
(United Kingdom) Dorothy Shaw	3	3
(United Kingdom) Phyllis Covell	6	6
(United Kingdom) Joan Fry	6	6
(France) Simonne Mathieu	3	2
(United Kingdom) Marie Hazel	4	4
(United Kingdom) Mrs ML Morrison	6	6

Third round
3	(Netherlands) K Bouman	7	6
(United Kingdom) P Covell	5	3
(United Kingdom) J Fry	6	6
Q	(United Kingdom) Mrs ML Morrison	2	2

Fourth round
3	(Netherlands) K Bouman	6	4	7
(United Kingdom) J Fry	2	6	9

==== Section 8 ====
First round

Second round
6	(United States) Molla Mallory	6	6
(United Kingdom) Betty Boas	3	2
(Germany) Cilly Aussem	3	2
(United Kingdom) Betty Nuthall	6	6
(United Kingdom) Dorothy Hill	6	6
Q	(United Kingdom) HL Eddis	1	2
(United Kingdom) Betty Dix	4	3
(United Kingdom) Peggy Saunders	6	6

Third round
6	(United States) M Mallory	6	2	0
(United Kingdom) B Nuthall	2	6	6
(United Kingdom) D Hill	6	6
(United Kingdom) M Saunders	2	4

Fourth round
(United Kingdom) B Nuthall	6	6
(United Kingdom) D Hill	3	3

Preceded by 1927 French Championships	Grand Slams; Women's Singles	Succeeded by 1927 U.S. National Championships
