= 1929 French Championships – Women's singles =

Women's singles
- 1929 French Championships

Final
- Champion: (United States) Helen Wills
- Runner-up: (France) Simonne Mathieu
- Score: 6–3, 6–4

Details
- Seeds: 8

Events
Singles	men	women
Doubles	men	women
← 1928 ·	French Championships	· 1930 →

Helen Wills defeated Simonne Mathieu 6–3, 6–4 in the final to win the women's singles tennis title at the 1929 French Championships.

== Seeds ==
The seeded players are listed below. Helen Wills is the champion; others show the round in which they were eliminated.

1. (United States) Helen Wills (champion)
2. (South Africa) Bobbie Heine Miller (quarterfinals)
3. (United Kingdom) Phoebe Holcroft Watson (quarterfinals)
4. (United Kingdom) Eileen Bennett (semifinals)
5. (Netherlands) Kornelia Bouman (first round)
6. (France) Simonne Mathieu (finalist)
7. (Germany) Cilly Aussem (semifinals)
8. (Germany) Irmgard Rost (third round)

== Draw ==
=== Key ===
- Q = Qualifier
- WC = Wild card
- LL = Lucky loser
- r = Retired

=== Finals ===
Quarterfinals
1	(United States) Helen Wills	6	6
(France) Sylvie Henrotin	4	1
4	(United Kingdom) Eileen Bennett	7	6
(South Africa) Alida Neave	5	1
6	(France) Simonne Mathieu	4	6	6
3	(United Kingdom) Phoebe Watson	6	3	1
7	(Germany) Cilly Aussem	5	6	6
2	(South Africa) Bobbie Heine Miller	7	3	4

Semifinals
1	(United States) Helen Wills	6	7
4	(United Kingdom) Eileen Bennett	2	5
6	(France) Simonne Mathieu	8	2	6
7	(Germany) Cilly Aussem	6	6	2

Finals
1	(United States) Helen Wills	6	6
6	(France) Simonne Mathieu	3	4

=== Earlier rounds ===
==== Section 1 ====
First round
(France) Vaussard	4	5
(Belgium) Sigart	6	7
8	(Germany) Rost	6	6
(France) Rosambert	4	3
(United Kingdom) Goldsack	8	6
(France) Anet	6	4
(France) Henrotin	7	3	6
(South Africa) De Smidt	5	6	3
(France) Le Conte	1	1
(Germany) Krahwinkel	6	6

Second round
1	(United States) Wills
(United Kingdom) Hardie
(South Africa) Tapscott	6	6
(Belgium) Sigart	2	2
8	(Germany) Rost	1	13	6
(United Kingdom) Goldsack	6	12	2
(France) Henrotin	4	6	6
(Germany) Krahwinkel	6	4	3

Third round
1	(United States) Wills	6	6
(South Africa) Tapscott	1	3
8	(Germany) Rost	6	4	1
(France) Henrotin	3	6	6

Quarterfinals
1	(United States) Wills	6	6
(France) Henrotin	4	1

==== Section 2 ====
First round
4	(United Kingdom) Bennett	6	6
(France) Amaury	2	3
(France) Barbier	6	7
(Switzerland) Schäublin	3	5
(Germany) Von Reznicek
Hanckett
(France) Bordes	7	6
(United Kingdom) Tapscott	5	2
5	(Netherlands) Bouman
(United Kingdom) Ridley
Lowenthal	6	5	6
(France) Neufeld	3	7	0
(South Africa) Neave	6	6	6
(France) Charpenel	8	2	2
(United Kingdom) Thomas	1	4
(France) Kleinadel	6	6

Second round
4	(United Kingdom) Bennett	6	6
(France) Barbier	3	2
Hanckett	0	2
(France) Bordes	6	6
(United Kingdom) Ridley	6	6
Lowenthal	4	1
(South Africa) Neave	7	10
(France) Kleinadel	5	8

Third round
4	(United Kingdom) Bennett	6	3	7
(France) Bordes	4	6	5
(United Kingdom) Ridley	6	2	2
(South Africa) Neave	2	6	6

Quarterfinals
4	(United Kingdom) Bennett	7	6
(South Africa) Neave	5	1

==== Section 3 ====
First round
(United States) Bundy	7	6
(France) Peyre	5	1
(France) Bernard	0	0
(Germany) Friedleben	6	6
(Italy) Valerio	6	6
(France) Culbert	2	2
(United Kingdom) Johnstone	2	2
6	(France) Mathieu	6	6
(Germany) Peitz	6	6
(France) Wyns-Speranza	3	1
(France) Guillier	2	0
(South Africa) Cole	6	6
(United States) Morrill	6	6
(France) Danet	2	0
(France) Charnelet	2	1
3	(United Kingdom) Watson	6	6

Second round
(United States) Bundy	5	1
(Germany) Friedleben	7	6
(Italy) Valerio	4	3
6	(France) Mathieu	6	6
(Germany) Peitz	6	3	7
(South Africa) Cole	4	6	5
(United States) Morrill	0	3
3	(United Kingdom) Watson	6	6

Third round
(Germany) Friedleben	10	1	5
6	(France) Mathieu	8	6	7
(Germany) Peitz	3	1
3	(United Kingdom) Watson	6	6

Quarterfinals
6	(France) Mathieu	4	6	6
3	(United Kingdom) Watson	6	3	1

==== Section 4 ====
First round
(Belgium) Sigart	0	2
(France) Adamoff	6	6
(France) Lebesnerais	2	2
(Netherlands) Couquerque	6	6
(France) Metaxa	2	1
(Switzerland) Payot	6	6
(France) Gallay	1	1
7	(Germany) Aussem	6	6
(France) Berthet	5	6
(France) Macready	7	4	r

Second round
(France) Adamoff	6	6
(Netherlands) Couquerque	2	1
(Switzerland) Payot	2	4
7	(Germany) Aussem	6	6
(France) Berthet	6	10
(United States) Cross	3	8
(France) Fourcade	3	5
2	(South Africa) Heine Miller	6	7

Third round
(France) Adamoff	3	3
7	(Germany) Aussem	6	6
(France) Berthet	4	4
2	(South Africa) Heine Miller	6	6

Quarterfinals
7	(Germany) Aussem	5	6	6
2	(South Africa) Heine Miller	7	3	4

Preceded by 1929 Australian Championships – Women's singles	Grand Slam women's singles	Succeeded by 1929 Wimbledon Championships – Women's singles
