= 1927 French Championships – Women's singles =

Women's singles
- 1927 French Championships

Final
- Champion: (Netherlands) Kea Bouman
- Runner-up: (South Africa) Irene Bowder Peacock
- Score: 6–2, 6–4

Details
- Seeds: 8

Events
Singles	men	women
Doubles	men	women
- French Championships

Third-seeded Kea Bouman defeated Irene Bowder Peacock 6–2, 6–4 in the final to win the women's singles tennis title at the 1927 French Championships. She is the first and to date only Dutch women to win a Grand Slam singles title.

== Seeds ==
The seeded players are listed below. Kornelia Bouman is the champion; others show the round in which they were eliminated.

1. (France) Marguerite Billout (quarterfinals)
2. (Spain) Lilly De Alvarez (quarterfinals)
3. (Netherlands) Kea Bouman (champion)
4. (South Africa) Irene Peacock (finalist)
5. (Germany) Cilly Aussem (quarterfinals)
6. (France) Suzanne Devé (third round)
7. (United Kingdom) Phoebe Holcroft Watson (third round)
8. (United Kingdom) Eileen Bennett (semifinals)

== Draw ==
=== Key ===
- Q = Qualifier
- WC = Wild card
- LL = Lucky loser
- r = Retired

=== Finals ===
Quarterfinals
1	(France) Marguerite Billout	6	2	2
8	(United Kingdom) Eileen Bennett	4	6	6
4	(South Africa) Irene Peacock	4	6	6
5	(Germany) Cilly Aussem	6	2	4
–	(South Africa) Billie Tapscott	2	0
3	(Netherlands) Kea Bouman	6	6
–	(South Africa) Bobbie Heine	3	7	7
2	(Spain) Lilly De Alvarez	6	5	5

Semifinals
8	(United Kingdom) Eileen Bennett	7	1	7
4	(South Africa) Irene Peacock	5	6	9
3	(Netherlands) Kea Bouman	5	6	6
–	(South Africa) Bobbie Heine	7	4	3

Finals
4	(South Africa) Irene Peacock	2	4
3	(Netherlands) Kea Bouman	6	6

=== Earlier rounds ===
==== Section 1 ====
First round

Second round
1	(France) Billout	6	6
(France) Cantenat	1	2
(France) Barbier
(France) Gounouilhou
8	(United Kingdom) Bennett	6	6
(France) Lebesnerais	2	3
(Germany) Neppach	6	7
(France) Wyns-Speranza	1	5

Third round
1	(France) Billout	6	6
(France) Barbier	3	1
8	(United Kingdom) Bennett	4	6	7
(Germany) Neppach	6	2	5

Quarterfinals
1	(France) Billout	4	6	6
8	(United Kingdom) Bennett	6	2	2

==== Section 2 ====
First round
5	(Germany) Aussem	6	1	6
(Greece) Contostavlos	0	6	3
(France) Danet
(United Kingdom) Ridley
(France) Des Landes De Danoet	6	4	6
(Belgium) Sigart	4	6	4
(Spain) Rosenbaum	1	6	5
(France) Mathieu	6	4	7

Second round
4	(South Africa) Peacock	6	6
(France) Golding	4	4
(Belgium) Sigart	3	5
(France) Charnelet	6	7
5	(Germany) Aussem	6	6
(United Kingdom) Ridley	3	4
(France) Des Landes De Danoet	4	5
(France) Mathieu	6	7

Third round
4	(South Africa) Peacock	6	6
(France) Charnelet	2	3
5	(Germany) Aussem	6	4	6
(France) Mathieu	3	6	0

Quarterfinals
4	(South Africa) Peacock	4	6	6
5	(Germany) Aussem	6	2	4

==== Section 3 ====
First round
(Spain) Pons	4	1
(France) Cousin	6	6
(South Africa) Tapscott
(France) De Montebello
(France) Gallay	4	2
(United Kingdom) Saunders-Taylor	6	6
(France) Amaury	1	6	5
6	(France) Deve	6	2	7

Second round
(France) Cousin	9	7
(South Africa) Tapscott	11	9
(United Kingdom) Saunders-Taylor	6	2	1
6	(France) Deve	3	6	6
(France) Beauge	2	1
(Germany) Friedleben	6	6
(France) Le Conte	2	4
3	(Netherlands) Bouman	6	6

Third round
(South Africa) Tapscott	6	6
6	(France) Deve	3	2
(Germany) Friedleben	6	1	2
3	(Netherlands) Bouman	3	6	6

Quarterfinals
(South Africa) Tapscott	2	0
3	(Netherlands) Bouman	6	6

==== Section 4 ====
First round

Second round
(France) Bourgeois	6	5	6
(South Africa) Bobbie Heine	1	7	8
(France) Grasset	2	2
7	(United Kingdom) Watson	6	6
(Germany) Von Reznicek	4	6	7
(France) Vaussard	6	2	5
(France) Holzschuch	2	1
2	(Spain) De Alvarez	6	6

Third round
(South Africa) Bobbie Heine	6	6
7	(United Kingdom) Watson	2	4
(Germany) Von Reznicek	2	3
2	(Spain) De Alvarez	6	6

Quarterfinals
(South Africa) Bobbie Heine	3	7	7
2	(Spain) De Alvarez	6	5	5

Preceded by 1927 Australian Championships – Women's singles	Grand Slam women's singles	Succeeded by 1927 Wimbledon Championships – Women's singles
