= 1927 Wimbledon Championships =

- Date: 20 June – 5 July
- Edition: 47th
- Category: Grand Slam
- Surface: Grass
- Location: Church Road; SW19, Wimbledon, London, United Kingdom
- Venue: All England Lawn Tennis and Croquet Club

Champions

Men's singles
- (France) Henri Cochet

Women's singles
- (United States) Helen Wills

Men's doubles
- (United States) Frank Hunter / (United States) Bill Tilden

Women's doubles
- (United States) Elizabeth Ryan / (United States) Helen Wills

Mixed doubles
- (United States) Frank Hunter / (United States) Elizabeth Ryan
- Wimbledon Championships

The 1927 Wimbledon Championships took place on the outdoor grass courts at the All England Lawn Tennis and Croquet Club in Wimbledon, London, United Kingdom. The tournament was held from Monday 20 June until Saturday 2 July 1927. It was the 47th staging of the Wimbledon Championships, and the third Grand Slam tennis event of 1927. It was also the Wimbledon’s 50th anniversary of the staging of the Wimbledon Tennis Championships.

This was the first Wimbledon Championships where the draw used a merit-based seeding of ranked players to prevent the top players from meeting each other in the early rounds. Eight players were seeded in both the men's and women's singles and four pairs in the double. The seeding was done according to the ranking of the players in their own countries. René Lacoste and Helen Wills were the first no.1 seeded singles players. Since the 1924 Championships a seeding based on nationality was used to prevent nominated players from the same nationality to meet before the later rounds.

Another innovation that year was the installation of a microphone and loudspeakers on Centre Court to broadcast the calls of the umpire. A special footfault judge was introduced for the centre court and court no.1. The BBC first began radio broadcast of the tournament this year, with the first radio broadcast taking place on 29 June and diffused on 2LO. Only matches on Centre Court were covered in the first year, with Teddy Wakelam providing commentary for the BBC.

== Finals ==
=== Men's singles ===
(France) Henri Cochet defeated (France) Jean Borotra, 4–6, 4–6, 6–3, 6–4, 7–5

=== Women's singles ===
(United States) Helen Wills defeated (Spain) Lilí de Álvarez, 6–2, 6–4

=== Men's doubles ===
(United States) Frank Hunter / (United States) Bill Tilden defeated (France) Jacques Brugnon / (France) Henri Cochet, 1–6, 4–6, 8–6, 6–3, 6–4

=== Women's doubles ===
(United States) Elizabeth Ryan / (United States) Helen Wills defeated (South Africa) Bobbie Heine / (South Africa) Irene Peacock, 6–3, 6–2

=== Mixed doubles ===
(United States) Frank Hunter / (United States) Elizabeth Ryan defeated (United Kingdom) Leslie Godfree / (United Kingdom) Kitty Godfree, 8–6, 6–0

| Preceded by 1927 French Championships | Grand Slams | Succeeded by 1927 U.S. National Championships |
