= 1929 French Championships (tennis) =

Tennis contest

- Date: 20 May – 3 June 1929
- Edition: 34th
- Category: 5th Grand Slam (ITF)
- Surface: Clay
- Location: Paris (XVI^{e}), France
- Venue: Stade Roland Garros

Champions

Men's singles
- (France) René Lacoste

Women's singles
- (United States) Helen Wills Moody

Men's doubles
- (France) René Lacoste / (France) Jean Borotra

Women's doubles
- (Spain) Lilí de Álvarez / (Netherlands) Kea Bouman

Mixed doubles
- (United Kingdom) Eileen Bennett Whittingstall / (France) Henri Cochet
← 1928 ·	French Championships	· 1930 →

The 1929 French Championships (now known as the French Open) was a tennis tournament that took place on the outdoor clay courts at the Stade Roland-Garros in Paris, France. The tournament ran from 20 May until 3 June. It was the 34th staging of the French Championships and the second Grand Slam tournament of the year.

René Lacoste and Helen Wills Moody won the singles titles. It was Lacoste's seventh and last Grand Slam singles title.

== Finals ==
=== Men's singles ===
(France) René Lacoste (FRA) defeated (France) Jean Borotra (FRA) 6–3, 2–6, 6–0, 2–6, 8–6

=== Women's singles ===
(United States) Helen Wills Moody (USA) defeated (France) Simonne Mathieu (FRA) 6–3, 6–4

=== Men's doubles ===
(France) René Lacoste (FRA) / (France) Jean Borotra (FRA) defeated (France) Henri Cochet (FRA) / (France) Jacques Brugnon (FRA) 6–3, 3–6, 6–3, 3–6, 8–6

=== Women's doubles ===
(Spain) Lilí Álvarez (ESP) / (Netherlands) Kea Bouman (NED) defeated (South Africa) Bobbie Heine (RSA) / (South Africa) Alida Neave (RSA) 7–5, 6–3

=== Mixed doubles ===
(United Kingdom) Eileen Bennett Whittingstall (GBR) / (France) Henri Cochet (FRA) defeated (United States) Helen Wills Moody (USA) / (United States) Frank Hunter (USA) 6–3, 6–2

Preceded by 1929 Australian Championships	Grand Slams	Succeeded by 1929 Wimbledon Championships
