= 1928 French Championships (tennis) =

Tennis tournament

- Date: 24 May – 4 June 1928
- Edition: 33rd
- Category: 4th Grand Slam (ITF)
- Surface: Clay
- Location: Paris (XVI^{e}), France
- Venue: Stade Roland Garros

Champions

Men's singles
- (France) Henri Cochet

Women's singles
- (United States) Helen Wills

Men's doubles
- (France) Jean Borotra / (France) Jacques Brugnon

Women's doubles
- (United Kingdom) Phoebe Holcroft Watson / (United Kingdom) Eileen Bennett Whittingstall

Mixed doubles
- (United Kingdom) Eileen Bennett Whittingstall / (France) Henri Cochet
← 1927 ·	French Championships	· 1929 →

The 1928 French Championships (now known as the French Open) was a tennis tournament that took place on the outdoor clay courts at the Stade Roland-Garros in Paris, France. The tournament ran from 24 May until 4 June. It was the 33rd staging of the French Championships and the second Grand Slam tournament of the year. It was the first tournament held at the new Roland-Garros stadium which was built during the winter of 1927/1928. Henri Cochet and Helen Wills won the singles titles. Wills became the first American women to win the singles event.

== Finals ==
=== Men's singles ===
(France) Henri Cochet (FRA) defeated (France) René Lacoste (FRA) 5–7, 6–3, 6–1, 6–3

=== Women's singles ===
(United States) Helen Wills (USA) defeated (United Kingdom) Eileen Bennett (GBR) 6–1, 6–2

=== Men's doubles ===
(France) Jean Borotra (FRA) / (France) Jacques Brugnon (FRA) defeated (France) Henri Cochet (FRA) / (France) René de Buzelet (FRA) 6–4, 3–6, 6–2, 3–6, 6–4

=== Women's doubles ===
(United Kingdom) Phoebe Holcroft Watson (GBR) / (United Kingdom) Eileen Bennett Whittingstall (GBR) defeated (France) Suzanne Devé (FRA) / (France) Sylvie Lafaurie (FRA) 6–0, 6–2

=== Mixed doubles ===
(United Kingdom) Eileen Bennett Whittingstall (GBR) / (France) Henri Cochet (FRA) defeated (United States) Helen Wills (USA) / (United States) Frank Hunter (USA) 3–6, 6–3, 6–3

Preceded by 1928 Australian Championships	Grand Slams	Succeeded by 1928 Wimbledon Championships
