= South African Open (tennis) =

Defunct tennis tournament
- Tour: Pre-open era (1891–1967); Open era Independent tour (1968–1971, 1974–89); Grand Prix Tour (1972–89); World Championship Series (1983–87); ATP Tour (1990–1995)
- Founded: 1891
- Abolished: 1995
- Editions: 89
- Location: Various cities in South Africa
- Venue: Various
- Surface: Hard (1891–1995)

The South African Open – formerly known as the South African Championships, and for sponsorship reasons the Altech NCR South African Open and the Panasonic South African Open – is a defunct Grand Prix Tennis Tour, World Championship Series, ATP Tour and Virginia Slims Circuit affiliated tennis tournament played from 1891 to 1995 in South Africa. It was part of the pre-open era international seasonal tours from 1891 to 1967 from 1968 to 1971, part of the open era independent events tour from 1972, when it became part the men's Grand Prix Tour until 1989. The women's side of the competition was only briefly part of Virginia Slims tour (1970–74) before it returned to the independent circuit.

The men's event joined the ATP Tour in 1990. It was mainly held in Johannesburg in South Africa, but played in other locations such as Cape Town, Durban, Port Elizabeth, East London, Bloemfontein, Kimberly and Pretoria. The tournament was played on outdoor hard courts it ran for a period of 105 years until 1995.

== History ==
The first South African Championships were first played in 1891 until 1967 and took place in Port Elizabeth. The tournament was held at and organized by the Port Elizabeth Lawn Tennis Club. This inaugural edition consisted of a men's singles, women's singles, men's doubles and mixed doubles event. The tournament was not played from 1900 to 1902 due to the Boer War. After the formation of the South African Lawn Tennis Union in 1903 the location of the tournament circulated between Johannesburg, Cape Town, Durban, Port Elizabeth, East London, Bloemfontein, Kimberly and Pretoria. In 1905 the women's doubles competition was added. The tournament was not held from 1915 to 1919 due to World War I, and from 1941 to 1945 due to World War II. The first men's singles winner was Lionel Richardson from Bloemfontein. In 1931 Ellis Park in Johannesburg became the permanent venue for the championships. In 1968 the event went open and was from then on known as the South African Open Sets were played on advantage until 1971; Lingering death tiebreaks at six games all were subsequently adopted. Finals were the best-of-five-sets until the tournament's suspension in 1990; upon its return in 1992 finals were reduced to the best-of-three-sets the men's tournament was suspended again from 1996 until 2006. The women's tournament was also stopped in 1982,1985 and 1988 it was played in 1990 but did not continue after that date.

ATP Tour tennis returned to South Africa in 2009 under the banner of the SA Tennis Open. The history of this event, however, is not part of the history of the Open. The SA Tennis Open, which was part of the 250 series of events, was discontinued in 2011.

The most successful male player at the South African Championships – played from 1891 to 1967 during the Amateur Era – was Eric Sturgess, who won eleven titles between 1939 and 1957 and lost a further final in 1947 to Eustace Fannin. He also holds the overall record for the most consecutive titles won – seven between 1948 and 1954. Five players share the record for the most male wins at the tournament in the Open Era – Rod Laver (1969, 1970), Jimmy Connors (1973, 1974), Harold Solomon (1975, 1976), Vitas Gerulaitis (1981, 1982) and Aaron Krickstein (1992, 1993).

The most successful female player at the South African Championships – played from 1891 to 1967 during the Amateur Era – was Mrs H.A. Kirby, who won six titles between 1904 and 1912. She also shares the overall record for the most consecutive titles won with Miss H. Grant. Both players won four consecutive titles – Grant won the first four South African titles from 1891 to 1894 and Mrs Kirby won four titles between 1904 and 1907. Margaret Court and Brigitte Cuypers share the record for the most wins at the tournament in the Open Era. Court won three titles in 1968, 1970 and 1971 and Cuypers won in 1976, 1978 and 1979.

The following comprises the full list of South African Open men's singles champions. and South African Open women's singles champions.

== Finals ==
NB: The following tables below comprise full lists of champions from 1891 until 1995

=== Men's singles ===
Year	Champion	Runner-up	Score
1891	(South Africa) Lionel Richardson	(South Africa) Lyndhurst Winslow	6–2, 10–8, 6–2
1892	(South Africa) Lionel Richardson(2)	(South Africa) R. Davis	Unavailable
1893	(South Africa) Walter T. Edmonds	(South Africa) Lionel Richardson	6–3, 6–3, 6–4
1894	(South Africa) Lennox L. Giddy	(South Africa) Walter T. Edmonds	6–1, 6–3, 6–0
1895	(South Africa) Lennox L. Giddy	(South Africa) Stanley Bayly	6–4, 6–3, 6–2
1896	(South Africa) Lennox L. Giddy	(South Africa) H.R. Eaton	Unavailable
1897	(South Africa) Lennox L. Giddy	(South Africa) William C. Stevens	8–10, 12–10, 4–6, 6–4, 6–2
1898	(South Africa) Lennox L. Giddy	(South Africa) George C. Collins	Unavailable
1899	(South Africa) Leonard G. Heard	(South Africa) Lennox L. Giddy	6–3, 6–2, 3–6, 6–1
1900–1902	Not held due to Second Boer War		
1903	(South Africa) R.W.G. Clarke	(South Africa) H.M Steele	6–4, 6–0, 6–3
1904	(South Africa) Percy Sherwell	(South Africa) R.W.G. Clarke	6–3, 6–2, 6–1
1905	(South Africa) Harold Kitson	(South Africa) A.J. Rowan	6–1, 2–6, 6–3, 8–6
1906	(South Africa) John R. Richardson	(South Africa) Cecil E. Howard Tripp	6–4, 7–5, 6–2
1907	(South Africa) A.J. Rowan	(South Africa) Cecil E. Howard Tripp	7–5, 5–7, 1–6, 6–4, 6–3
1908	(South Africa) Harold Kitson	(South Africa) Victor Gauntlett	6–2, 5–7, 6–2, 7–9, 6–2
1909	(United Kingdom of Great Britain and Ireland) Reginald Doherty	(United Kingdom of Great Britain and Ireland) Lionel Escombe	6–3, 6–1, 6–1
1910	(New Zealand) Anthony Wilding	(Union of South Africa) Harold Kitson	6–0, 6–3, 6–4
1911	(Union of South Africa) Harold Kitson	(Union of South Africa) Father Kelly	6–4, 6–3, 6–2
1912	(Union of South Africa) George Dodd	(Union of South Africa) R.F. Le Sueur	6–1, 4–6, 6–3, 5–7, 6–0
1913	(Union of South Africa) Harold Kitson	(Union of South Africa) Harold I. Aitken	6–1, 6–4, 6–3
1914	(Union of South Africa) Charles Winslow	(South Africa) George Dodd	4–6, 7–9, 6–2, 6–3, 6–3
1915–1919	Not held (WW1)		
1920	(Union of South Africa) Brian Norton	(Union of South Africa) Louis Raymond	1–6, 6–4, 6–4, 6–3
1921	(Union of South Africa) Louis Raymond	(Union of South Africa) Marchant Davies	6–3, 6–0, 6–1
1922	(Union of South Africa) Louis Raymond	(Union of South Africa) George Dodd	6–3, 7–5, 6–2
1923	(Union of South Africa) Louis Raymond	(Union of South Africa) Jack Condon	6–3, 7–5, 4–6, 6–2
1924	(Union of South Africa) Louis Raymond	(Union of South Africa) George Dodd	6–4, 6–0, 3–6, 6–3
1925	(Union of South Africa) Ivie Richardson	(South Africa) Charles Winslow	7–5, 7–5, 2–6, 4–6, 6–4
1926	(Union of South Africa) Jack Condon	(Union of South Africa) Cecil Blackbeard	6–0, 6–3, 6–2
1927	(Union of South Africa) J.C. Guy Eaglestone	(Union of South Africa) C.H. Robbs	8–6, 3–6, 6–2, 6–4
1928	(South Africa) J.C. Guy Eaglestone	(South Africa) George Dodd	6–4, 6–1, 6–4
1929	(South Africa) Colin Robbins	(South Africa) George Dodd	6–1, 6–0, 6–3
1930	(South Africa) Louis Raymond	(South Africa) Colin Robbins	6–2, 5–7, 6–3, 6–4
1931	(South Africa) Louis Raymond	(South Africa) Robert H. M. Bertram	6–3, 4–6, 6–4, 6–2
1932	(South Africa) Robert H. M. Bertram	(South Africa) Colin Robbins	2–6, 9–7, 9–7, 6–1
1933	(South Africa) Colin Robbins	(South Africa) Vernon Kirby	6–1, 1–6, 4–6, 9–7, 6–4
1934	(South Africa) Norman Farquharson	(South Africa) Roy Malcolm	4–6, 6–2, 6–3, 14–12
1935	(South Africa) Norman Farquharson	(South Africa) Vernon Kirby	6–0, 6–4, 6–1
1936	(South Africa) Norman Farquharson	(South Africa) Robert H. M. Bertram	6–4, 6–4, 1–6, 6–2
1937	(Socialist Federal Republic of Yugoslavia) Josip Palada	(South Africa) Vernon Kirby	6–2, 0–6, 4–6, 6–1, 6–3
1938	(South Africa) Norman Farquharson	(South Africa) Vernon Kirby	4–6, 4–6, 7–5, 6–3, 6–0
1939	(South Africa) Eric Sturgess	(South Africa) Eustace Fannin	6–2, 9–7, 3–6, 6–8, 7–5
1940	(South Africa) Eric Sturgess	(South Africa) Robert H. M. Bertram	6–3, 2–6, 6–0, 6–2
1941–1945	Not held (WW2)		
1946	(South Africa) Eric Sturgess	(South Africa) Norman Farquharson	6–0, 6–2, 6–3
1947	(South Africa) Eustace Fannin	(South Africa) Eric Sturgess	6–1, 6–2, 1–6, 0–6, 6–4
1948	(South Africa) Eric Sturgess	(United Kingdom) Tony Mottram	6–3, 6–4, 6–8, 6–1
1949	(South Africa) Eric Sturgess	(Australia) Geoffrey Brown	4–6, 6–4, 6–2, 7–5
1950	(South Africa) Eric Sturgess	(United States) Arthur Larsen	6–1, 6–1, 3–6, 6–2
1951	(South Africa) Eric Sturgess	(South Africa) Sydney Levy	6–3, 6–2, 7–5
1952	(South Africa) Eric Sturgess	(South Africa) Sydney Levy	6–2, 6–2, 6–3
1953	(South Africa) Eric Sturgess	(South Africa) Russell Seymour	6–1, 6–3, 6–3
1954	(South Africa) Eric Sturgess	(Egypt) Jaroslav Drobný	5–7, 6–3, 6–4, 8–6
1955	(South Africa) Russell Seymour	(South Africa) Gordon Forbes	1–6, 9–7, 6–1, 8–6
1956	(South Africa) Ian Vermaak	(Sweden) Torsten Johansson	6–2, 4–6, 3–6, 6–3, 8–6
1957	(South Africa) Eric Sturgess	(South Africa) Gaetan Koenig	9–7, 6–3, 6–1
1958	(Sweden) Ulf Schmidt	(Denmark) Torben Ulrich	1–6, 12–10, 6–2, 6–8, 6–2
1959	(South Africa) Gordon Forbes	(South Africa) Ian Vermaak	6–4, 6–4, 6–2
1960	(United States) Butch Buchholz	(United States) Jack Frost	6–1, 7–5, 6–3
1961	(South Africa) Gordon Forbes	(South Africa) Julie Mayer	8–6, 3–6, 3–6, 6–4, 6–4
1962	(Australia) Bob Mark	(South Africa) Gordon Forbes	6–1, 6–1, 2–6, 8–6
1963	(West Germany) Wilhelm Bungert	(South Africa) Gordon Forbes	6–4, 6–4, 8–6
1964	(South Africa) Abe Segal	(South Africa) Gordon Forbes	4–6, 7–5, 6–3, 6–3
1965	(South Africa) Cliff Drysdale	(Spain) Juan Manuel Couder	1–6, 6–3, 6–4, 1–6, 6–3
1966	(Australia) Roy Emerson	(South Africa) Bob Hewitt	6–3, 2–6, 3–6, 6–4, 7–5
1967	(Spain) Manuel Santana	(Denmark) Jan Leschly	2–6, 6–2, 4–6, 6–3, 6–4
1968	(Netherlands) Tom Okker	(United States) Marty Riessen	12–10, 6–1, 6–4
↓ Open Era ↓
1969	(Australia) Rod Laver	(Netherlands) Tom Okker	6–3, 10–8, 6–3
1970	(Australia) Rod Laver	(South Africa) Frew McMillan	4–6, 6–2, 6–1, 6–2
1971	(Australia) Ken Rosewall	(Australia) Fred Stolle	6–4, 6–0, 6–4
1972	(United States) Cliff Richey	(Spain) Manuel Orantes	6–4, 7–5, 3–6, 6–4
1973	(United States) Jimmy Connors	(United States) Arthur Ashe	6–4, 7–6, 6–3
1974	(United States) Jimmy Connors	(United States) Arthur Ashe	7–6, 6–3, 6–1
1975	(United States) Harold Solomon	(United States) Brian Gottfried	6–2, 6–4, 5–7, 6–1
1976	(United States) Harold Solomon	(United States) Brian Gottfried	6–2, 6–7, 6–3, 6–4
1977	(Argentina) Guillermo Vilas	(United Kingdom) Buster Mottram	7–6, 6–3, 6–4
1978	(United States) Tim Gullikson	(United States) Harold Solomon	2–6, 7–6, 7–6, 6–7, 6–4
1979	(Rhodesia) Andrew Pattison	(Paraguay) Víctor Pecci	2–6 6–3 6–2 6–3
1980	(Australia) Kim Warwick	(United States) Fritz Buehning	6–2, 6–1, 6–2
1981	(United States) Vitas Gerulaitis	(United States) Jeff Borowiak	6–4, 7–6, 6–1
1982	(United States) Vitas Gerulaitis	(Argentina) Guillermo Vilas	7–6, 6–2, 4–6, 7–6
1983	(United States) Johan Kriek	(United Kingdom) Colin Dowdeswell	6–4, 4–6, 1–6, 7–5, 6–3
1984	(United States) Eliot Teltscher	(United States) Vitas Gerulaitis	6–3, 6–1, 7–6
1985	(United States) Matt Anger	(United States) Brad Gilbert	6–4, 3–6, 6–3, 6–2
1986	(Israel) Amos Mansdorf	(United States) Matt Anger	6–3, 3–6, 6–2, 7–5
1987	(Australia) Pat Cash	(United States) Brad Gilbert	7–6, 4–6, 2–6, 6–0, 6–1
1988	(Switzerland) Jakob Hlasek	(South Africa) Christo van Rensburg	6–7, 6–4, 6–1, 7–6
1989	(South Africa) Christo van Rensburg	(United States) Paul Chamberlin	6–4, 7–6, 6–3
1990	(South Africa) Wayne Ferreira	(South Africa) Mark Kaplan	6–3 7–5 7–6
1991	(United States) Todd Witsken	(South Africa) Wayne Ferreira	4–6 6–4 6–4
1992	(United States) Aaron Krickstein	(Commonwealth of Independent States) Alexander Volkov	6–4, 6–4
1993	(United States) Aaron Krickstein	(South Africa) Grant Stafford	6–3, 7–6
1994	(Germany) Markus Zoecke	(Germany) Hendrik Dreekmann	6–4, 6–1
1995	(Germany) Martin Sinner	(France) Guillaume Raoux	6–1, 6–4
1996–2006	Not held		
2007 (CH)	(France) Mathieu Montcourt	(South Africa) Rik de Voest	5–7, 6–3, 6–2
2008 (CH)	(Croatia) Ivan Ljubičić	(Austria) Stefan Koubek	7–6, 6–4

=== Women's singles ===
Year	Champion	Runner-up	Score
1891	(South Africa) Mabel Grant	(South Africa) Miss Blackburn	6–2, 6–0
1892	(South Africa) Mabel Grant	(South Africa) Mrs MacLagan	Unavailable
1893	(South Africa) Mabel Grant	(South Africa) Mrs MacLagan	6–1, 6–0
1894	(South Africa) Mabel Grant	(South Africa) Miss B. Grant	6–1, 6–0
1895	(South Africa) Miss L. Biddulph	(South Africa) Miss Fry	6–1, 6–4
1896	(South Africa) Mrs H. Green	(South Africa) Miss L. Biddulph	Unavailable
1897	(South Africa) Miss N. Hickman	(South Africa) Mrs H. Green	7–9, 12–10, 6–2
1898	(South Africa) Miss N. Hickman	(South Africa) Miss L. Biddulph	Unavailable
1899	(South Africa) Miss N. Hickman	(South Africa) Mrs H. Green	6–8, 6–2, 6–3
1900–1902	Not held (Boer War)		
1903	(South Africa) Miss F. Kuys	(South Africa) Mrs Mackay	6–0, 6–2
1904	(South Africa) Mrs H.A. Kirby	(South Africa) Mrs M. Nevill (Grant)	6–4, 5–7, 6–4
1905	(South Africa) Mrs H.A. Kirby	(South Africa) Mrs S.B.Syfret	6–2, 6–0
1906	(South Africa) Mrs H.A. Kirby	(South Africa) Mrs Greatwood	7–5, 6–2
1907	(South Africa) Mrs H.A. Kirby	(South Africa) Mrs R.H.Miller	6–1, 4–6, 6–2
1908	(South Africa) Miss M. Kelly	(South Africa) Mrs Gillmore	6–2, 6–1
1909	(South Africa) Mrs G. Washington	(South Africa) Miss Edwards	6–2, 7–9, 6–4
1910	(South Africa) Mrs H.A. Kirby	(South Africa) Mrs J Reid	6–1, 6–2
1911	(South Africa) Mrs G. Washington	(South Africa) Miss M. Kelly	6–0, 6–1
1912	(South Africa) Mrs H.A. Kirby	(South Africa) Olive Mathias	6–2, 6–0
1913	(United Kingdom) Miss M. Coles	(South Africa) Miss M. Kelly	6–3, 9–7
1914	(South Africa) Olive Mathias	(South Africa) Mrs H.A. Kirby	3–6, 6–2, 6–2
1915–1919	Not held (WW1)		
1920	(South Africa) Olive Winslow (Mathias)	(South Africa) Miss Phillips	6–3, 7–5
1921	(South Africa) Miss N. Edwards	(South Africa) Mrs W.F. du Plessis	6–1, 6–2
1922	(South Africa) Mrs M. McJannett	(South Africa) Miss J. Parker	6–2, 6–2
1923	(South Africa) Mrs C.K. Pitt	(South Africa) Mrs D.R.Moor	6–4, 6–3
1924	(Union of South Africa) Irene Peacock	(South Africa) Mrs L. McArthur	7–5, 6–4
1925	(Union of South Africa) Irene Peacock	(South Africa) Mrs L. McArthur	5–7, 6–1, 6–1
1926	(Union of South Africa) Irene Peacock	(Union of South Africa) Miss A. de Smit	6–2, 6–1
1927	(South Africa) Mrs M. McJannett	(South Africa) Mrs V. Everett	12–10, 6–4
1928	(South Africa) Bobbie Heine	(South Africa) Billie Tapscott	8–6, 6–3
1929	(South Africa) Mrs M. McJannett	(South Africa) Miss W.N. Miller	7–5, 6–2
1930	(South Africa) Billie Tapscott	(South Africa) Mrs V. Everett	7–5, 6–2
1931	(South Africa) Bobbie Heine	(South Africa) Miss W.N. Miller	6–3, 6–3
1932	(South Africa) Bobbie Heine Miller	(South Africa) Mrs W.N. Lowe (Miller)	6–0, 6–3
1933	(South Africa) Billie Tapscott Robbins	(South Africa) Mrs W.N. Lowe	6–4, 3–6, 6–1
1934	(South Africa) Billie Tapscott Robbins	(South Africa) Mrs W.N. Lowe	6–0, 6–3
1935	(South Africa) Mrs A. Allister	(South Africa) Billie Tapscott Robbins	6–4, 6–3
1936	(South Africa) Bobbie Heine Miller	(South Africa) Mrs V. Everett	6–2, 4–6, 6–4
1937	(South Africa) Bobbie Heine Miller	(South Africa) Alida Neave	6–4, 4–6, 6–0
1938	(South Africa) Billie Tapscott Robbins	(South Africa) Olive Craze	6–4, 6–4
1939	(South Africa) Olive Craze	(South Africa) Sheila Piercey	4–6, 6–3, 6–4
1940	(South Africa) Olive Craze	(South Africa) Sheila Piercey	4–6, 6–4, 6–4
1941–1945	Not held (WW2)		
1946	(South Africa) Mary D. Muller	(South Africa) Mrs O. Plessis	6–4, 6–4
1947	(South Africa) Mary D. Muller	(South Africa) Sheila Piercey Summers	6–2, 6–8, 6–2
1948	(South Africa) Sheila Summers	(United Kingdom) Kay Menzies	6–1, 6–4
1949	(South Africa) Sheila Summers	(Australia) Thelma Long	6–1, 6–1
1950	(United States) Shirley Fry	(United States) Doris Hart	4–6, 7–5, 6–3
1951	(South Africa) Sheila Summers	(South Africa) Hazel Redick-Smith	8–6, 2–6, 7–5
1952	(United States) Doris Hart	(South Africa) Julia Wipplinger	6–1, 7–5
1953	(South Africa) Hazel Redick-Smith	(South Africa) Julia Wipplinger	6–2, 6–2
1954	(South Africa) Hazel Redick-Smith	(South Africa) Gwendy Love	4–6, 6–3, 6–2
1955	(South Africa) Hazel Redick-Smith	(South Africa) Lucille van der Westhuizen	6–4, 6–3
1956	(South Africa) Dora Kilian	(South Africa) Gwendy Love	4–6, 7–5, 6–4
1957	(South Africa) Heather Brewer	(South Africa) Gwendy Love	8–10, 6–2, 6–3
1958	(South Africa) Bernice Carr	(South Africa) Heather Brewer-Segal	3–6, 7–5, 6–4
1959	(South Africa) Sandra Reynolds	(South Africa) Bernice Vukovich (Carr)	6–0, 8–6
1960	(South Africa) Bernice Vukovich	(South Africa) Sandra Reynolds	6–1, 2–6, 12–10
1961	(South Africa) Sandra Reynolds	(South Africa) Lynette Hutchings	6–4, 7–5
1962	(South Africa) Heather Brewer-Segal	(South Africa) Jean Forbes	6–1, 7–5
1963	(South Africa) Annette Van Zyl	(South Africa) Margaret Hunt	6–4, 2–6, 6–3
1964	(United States) Darlene Hard	(United Kingdom) Ann Haydon-Jones	6–3, 7–5
1965	(United Kingdom) Christine Truman	(South Africa) Annette Van Zyl	6–2, 6–3
1966	(United States) Billie Jean King	(Australia) Margaret Court	6–3, 6–2
1967	(United States) Billie Jean King	(Brazil) Maria Bueno	7–5, 5–7, 6–2
1968	(Australia) Margaret Court	(United Kingdom) Virginia Wade	6–4, 6–4
↓ Open Era ↓
1969	(United States) Billie Jean King	(United States) Nancy Richey	6–3, 6–4
1970	(Australia) Margaret Court	(United States) Billie Jean King	6–4, 1–6, 6–3
1971	(Australia) Margaret Court	(Australia) Evonne Goolagong	6–3, 6–1
1972	(Australia) Evonne Goolagong	(United Kingdom) Virginia Wade	4–6, 6–3, 6–0
1973	(United States) Chris Evert	(Australia) Evonne Goolagong	6–3, 6–3
1974	(Australia) Kerry Melville	(United States) Dianne Fromholtz	6–3, 7–5
1975	(South Africa) Annette du Plooy (van Zyl)	(South Africa) Brigitte Cuypers	6–3, 3–6, 6–4
1976	(South Africa) Brigitte Cuypers	(United States) Laura duPont	6–7, 6–4, 6–1
1977	(South Africa) Linky Boshoff	(South Africa) Brigitte Cuypers	6–1, 6–4
1978	(South Africa) Brigitte Cuypers	(United States) Linda Siegel	6–1, 6–0
1979	(South Africa) Brigitte Cuypers	(South Africa) Tanya Harford	7–6, 6–2
1980	(United Kingdom) Lesley Charles	(South Africa) Rene Uys	7–5, 6–4
1981	(United States) Kathy Horvath	(United States) Kathy Rinaldi	7–6, 6–4
1982–1983	Not held		
1984	(United States) Chris Evert-Lloyd	(United States) Andrea Jaeger	6–3, 6–0
1985	Not held		
1986	(South Africa) Dinky van Rensburg	(South Africa) Rene Mentz	6–3, 6–1
1987	(United States) Gretchen Magers	(United States) Louise Allen	6–7, 7–6, 6–4
1988–1989	Not held		
1990	(South Africa) Amanda Coetzer	(South Africa) Dinky van Rensburg	6–4, 6–4

=== Men's doubles ===
Year	Champions	Runners-up	Score
1969	(United States) Pancho Gonzales (South Africa) Ray Moore	(South Africa) Bob Hewitt (South Africa) Frew McMillan	6–3, 4–6, 6–1, 6–3
1970	(South Africa) Bob Hewitt (South Africa) Frew McMillan	(South Africa) Cliff Drysdale (United Kingdom) Roger Taylor	6–3, 6–3, 6–2
1971	(Australia) Ken Rosewall (Australia) Fred Stolle	(South Africa) Bob Hewitt (South Africa) Frew McMillan	5–7, 6–2, 6–1, 6–2
1972	(South Africa) Bob Hewitt (South Africa) Frew McMillan	(South Africa) Ray Moore (France) Georges Goven	6–3, 6–3, 6–4
1973	(United States) Arthur Ashe (Netherlands) Tom Okker	(Australia) Lew Hoad (South Africa) Robert Maud	6–2, 4–6, 6–2, 6–4
1974	(South Africa) Bob Hewitt (South Africa) Frew McMillan	(Netherlands) Tom Okker (United States) Marty Riessen	7–6, 6–4, 6–3
1975	(South Africa) Bob Hewitt (South Africa) Frew McMillan	(Germany) Karl Meiler (United States) Charlie Pasarell	7–5, 6–4
1976	(United States) Brian Gottfried (United States) Sherwood Stewart	(Spain) Juan Gisbert (United States) Stan Smith	1–6, 6–1, 6–2, 7–6
1977	(United States) Robert Lutz (United States) Stan Smith	(United States) Peter Fleming (South Africa) Raymond Moore	6–3, 7–5, 6–7, 7–6
1978	(United States) Peter Fleming (South Africa) Raymond Moore	(South Africa) Bob Hewitt (South Africa) Frew McMillan	6–3, 7–6
1979	(South Africa) Bob Hewitt (South Africa) Frew McMillan	(United States) Mike Cahill (United Kingdom) Buster Mottram	1–6, 6–1, 6–4
1980	(United States) Robert Lutz (United States) Stan Smith	(Switzerland) Heinz Günthardt (Australia) Paul McNamee	6–7, 6–3, 6–4
1981	(United States) Terry Moor (South Africa) John Yuill	(United States) Fritz Buehning (New Zealand) Russell Simpson	6–3, 5–7, 6–4, 6–7, 12–10
1982	(United States) Brian Gottfried (South Africa) Frew McMillan	(Israel) Shlomo Glickstein (Zimbabwe) Andrew Pattison	6–2, 6–2
1983	(United States) Steve Meister (United States) Brian Teacher	(Ecuador) Andrés Gómez (United States) Sherwood Stewart	6–7, 7–6, 6–2
1984	(United States) Tracy Delatte (Paraguay) Francisco González	(United States) Steve Meister (United States) Eliot Teltscher	7–6, 6–1
1985	(United Kingdom) Colin Dowdeswell (South Africa) Christo van Rensburg	(Israel) Amos Mansdorf (Israel) Shahar Perkiss	3–6, 7–6, 6–4
1986	(United States) Mike De Palmer (South Africa) Christo van Rensburg	(Ecuador) Andrés Gómez (United States) Sherwood Stewart	3–6, 6–2, 7–6
1987	(United States) Kevin Curren (United States) David Pate	(United States) Eric Korita (United States) Brad Pearce	6–4, 6–4
1988	(United States) Kevin Curren (United States) David Pate	(South Africa) Gary Muller (United States) Tim Wilkison	7–6, 6–4
1989	(United States) Luke Jensen (United States) Richey Reneberg	(United States) Kelly Jones (United States) Joey Rive	6–0, 6–4
1990–1991	Not Held		
1992	(South Africa) Pieter Aldrich (South Africa) Danie Visser	(South Africa) Wayne Ferreira (South Africa) Piet Norval	6–4, 6–4
1993	(South Africa) Lan Bale (Zimbabwe) Byron Black	(South Africa) Johan de Beer (South Africa) Marcos Ondruska	7–6, 6–2
1994	(South Africa) Marius Barnard (South Africa) Brent Haygarth	(South Africa) Ellis Ferreira (South Africa) Grant Stafford	6–3, 7–5
1995	(France) Rodolphe Gilbert (France) Guillaume Raoux	(Germany) Martin Sinner (Netherlands) Joost Winnink	6–4, 3–6, 6–3
1996–2006	Not held		
2007 (CH)	(South Africa) Rik de Voest (Germany) Dominik Meffert	(Switzerland) Stéphane Bohli (Israel) Noam Okun	6–4, 6–2
2008 (CH)	(Sweden) Jonas Björkman (Zimbabwe) Dominik Meffert	(Sweden) Thomas Johansson (Austria) Stefan Koubek	6–2, 6–2

== See also ==
- SA Tennis Open
- Category:National and multi-national tennis tournaments
