= Giddy =

Giddy may refer to:

- Giddy (album), 2009 compilation album by Irish band Pugwash
- Giddy (surname), includes a list of people with the name
- "Giddy", a 1977 song written by Paul McCartney on Roger Daltrey's album One of the Boys
- "Giddy", a 2023 song by Kep1er from the EP Lovestruck!
- Great dodecicosahedron
- Giddy Goat, fictional animated goat

== See also ==
- Gid (disambiguation)
