= Giddy (surname) =

Giddy is a surname. Notable people with the name include:

- Davies Giddy or Davies Gilbert (1767–1839), British engineer, author and politician
- Lennox Giddy (1869–1942), South African cricketer
- Norman Giddy (1876–1909), South African cricketer
- Terry Giddy (1950–2023), Australian Paralympic athlete

== See also ==
- Giddey, surname
