= Giddey =

Giddey is a surname. Notable people with the surname include:

- Josh Giddey (born 2002), Australian basketball player
- Warrick Giddey (born 1967), Australian basketball coach and former player

== See also ==
- Giddy (surname)
- Gidey, surname
