= 1928 Wimbledon Championships – Women's singles =

Women's singles
- 1928 Wimbledon Championships

Final
- Champion: (United States) Helen Wills
- Runner-up: (Spain) Lilí de Álvarez
- Score: 6–2, 6–3

Details
- Draw: 80 (10Q)
- Seeds: 8

Events
Singles	men	women		boys	girls
Doubles	men	women	mixed	boys	girls
- Wimbledon Championships

Helen Wills successfully defended her title, defeating Lilí de Álvarez in the final, 6–2, 6–3 to win the ladies' singles tennis title at the 1928 Wimbledon Championships.

== Seeds ==
1. (United States) Helen Wills (champion)
2. (Spain) Lilí de Álvarez (final)
3. (United Kingdom) Eileen Bennett (quarterfinals)
4. (United States) Elizabeth Ryan (semifinals)
5. (Netherlands) Kea Bouman (third round)
6. (United Kingdom) Phoebe Watson (quarterfinals)
7. (Germany) Cilly Aussem (quarterfinals)
8. (United States) Helen Jacobs (third round)

Click on the seed number of a player to go to their draw section.

== Draw ==
Key

- Q = Qualifier
- WC = Wild card
- LL = Lucky loser
- Alt = Alternate
- ITF = ITF entry
- PR = Protected ranking
- SR = Special ranking
- SE = Special exempt
- JE = Junior exempt
- JR = Junior Accelerator Programme entrant
- CO = College Accelerator Programme entrant
- NG = Next Gen Accelerator Program entrant
- w/o = Walkover
- r = Retired
- d = Defaulted

=== Finals ===
Quarterfinals
1	(United States) Helen Wills	6	6
6	(United Kingdom) Phoebe Watson	3	0
4	(United States) Elizabeth Ryan	6	4	6
(Greece) Helene Nicolopoulos	1	6	2
2	(Spain) Lilí de Álvarez	7	6
7	(Germany) Cilly Aussem	5	2
3	(United Kingdom) Eileen Bennett	6	3	2
(Australia) Daphne Akhurst	2	6	6

Semifinals
1	(United States) Helen Wills	6	6
4	(United States) Elizabeth Ryan	1	1
2	(Spain) Lilí de Álvarez	6	6
(Australia) Daphne Akhurst	3	0

Final
1	(United States) Helen Wills	6	6
2	(Spain) Lilí de Álvarez	2	3

=== Top half ===
==== Section 1 ====
First round

Second round
1	(United States) Helen Wills	6	6
(United Kingdom) Elsie Goldsack	2	1
(Denmark) Inga Sperling	4	6	3
(France) Violette Gallay	6	0	6
(United Kingdom) Mrs HV Edwards	2	1
(United Kingdom) Ermyntrude Harvey	6	6
Q	(United Kingdom) Phyllis Mudford	6	3	7
(France) Elizabeth Macready	2	6	5

Third round
1	(United States) H Wills	6	6
(France) V Gallay	0	0
(United Kingdom) E Harvey	6	6
Q	(United Kingdom) P Mudford	2	2

Fourth round
1	(United States) H Wills	6	6
(United Kingdom) E Harvey	2	3

==== Section 2 ====
First round

Second round
6	(United Kingdom) Phoebe Watson	6	6
Q	(United Kingdom) Beatrice Feltham	2	2
(Netherlands) Mence Canters	1	2
(Australia) Meryl O'Hara Wood	6	6
(United Kingdom) Dorothy Shaw	2	6	2
(United Kingdom) Aurea Edgington	6	1	6
(United Kingdom) Madge Slaney	6	6	4
(Germany) Ellen Hoffman	2	8	6

Third round
6	(United Kingdom) P Watson	6	6
(Australia) M O'Hara Wood	0	1
(United Kingdom) A Edgington	7	6	8
(Germany) E Hoffman	9	1	6

Fourth round
6	(United Kingdom) P Watson	6	6
(United Kingdom) A Edgington	0	0

==== Section 3 ====
First round

Second round
4	(United States) Elizabeth Ryan	6	6
(United Kingdom) Kathleen Bridge	1	4
(United Kingdom) Betty Dix	2	6	4
(France) Jacqueline Gallay	6	4	6
(Australia) Esna Boyd	6	10
(United Kingdom) Gwen Sterry	3	8
(United Kingdom) Madge List	4	2
Q	(United Kingdom) H Evelyn-Jones	6	6

Third round
4	(United States) E Ryan	6	6
(France) J Gallay	4	1
(Australia) E Boyd	6	6
Q	(United Kingdom) H Evelyn-Jones	0	1

Fourth round
4	(United States) E Ryan	6	6
(Australia) E Boyd	0	2

==== Section 4 ====
First round
5	(Netherlands) Kea Bouman	6	7
(United Kingdom) Claire Beckingham	2	5
(Germany) Paula von Reznicek	6	6
Q	(United Kingdom) Dorothy Anderson	1	4
(United Kingdom) Effie Hemmant	6	3	3
(United Kingdom) Sylvia Lumley-Ellis	4	6	6
(France) Marguerite Bordes	4	4
(Greece) Helene Nicolopoulos	6	6
(United Kingdom) Christabel Hardie	4	4
(United States) Penelope Anderson	6	6
(United Kingdom) Mary Davies
(Czechoslovakia) Josefine von Lobkowitz	w/o
Q	(United Kingdom) Naomi Trentham	6	6	8
Q	(United Kingdom) Dorothy Round	2	8	6
(United Kingdom) Betty Nuthall	w/o
(United Kingdom) Phyllis Whitley

Second round
5	(Netherlands) K Bouman	6	6
(Germany) P von Reznicek	3	2
(United Kingdom) S Lumley-Ellis	2	1
(Greece) H Nicolopoulos	6	6
(United States) P Anderson	6	6
(United Kingdom) M Davies	2	4
Q	(United Kingdom) N Trentham	6	4	6
(United Kingdom) P Whitley	2	6	4

Third round
5	(Netherlands) K Bouman	10	6
(Greece) H Nicolopoulos	12	8
(United States) P Anderson	6	4	4
Q	(United Kingdom) N Trentham	3	6	6

Fourth round
(Greece) H Nicolopoulos	5	6	6
Q	(United Kingdom) N Trentham	7	2	1

=== Bottom half ===
==== Section 5 ====
First round
2	(Spain) Lilí de Álvarez	6	6
(United Kingdom) Joan Lycett	2	2
(United Kingdom) Mabel Mavrogordato	3	0
(United Kingdom) Phyllis Covell	6	6
(United Kingdom) Peggy Saunders	5	4
(United Kingdom) Evelyn Colyer	7	6
Q	(United Kingdom) Doreen Busby	w/o
(United Kingdom) Joan Fry
(United Kingdom) CJ Tyrrell	8	3	0
(Netherlands) Madzy Couquerque	6	6	6
(United Kingdom) Mary Cambridge	2	0
(United Kingdom) Eleanor Rose	6	6
(United States) Molla Mallory	3	6	4
(Australia) Louie Bickerton	6	4	6
(Belgium) Josane Sigart	9	4
(United Kingdom) Davinia Gordon	11	6

Second round
2	(Spain) E de Álvarez	4	6	7
(United Kingdom) P Covell	6	3	5
(United Kingdom) E Colyer	4	6	6
(United Kingdom) J Fry	6	3	4
(Netherlands) M Couquerque	4	2
(United Kingdom) E Rose	6	6
(Australia) L Bickerton	6	6
(United Kingdom) D Gordon	1	4

Third round
2	(Spain) E de Álvarez	6	6
(United Kingdom) E Colyer	4	4
(United Kingdom) E Rose	3	1
(Australia) L Bickerton	6	6

Fourth round
2	(Spain) E de Álvarez	9	6
(Australia) L Bickerton	7	4

==== Section 6 ====
First round

Second round
7	(Germany) Cilly Aussem	6	6
(United Kingdom) Violet Chamberlain	2	4
(United Kingdom) R Watson	6	5	3
(United Kingdom) Phyllis Satterthwaite	4	7	6
Q	(United Kingdom) Kate Anningson	0	2
(United Kingdom) Winifred Beamish	6	6
Q	(United Kingdom) Vera Marshall	2	3
(United Kingdom) Joan Strawson	6	6

Third round
7	(Germany) C Aussem	6	7
(United Kingdom) P Satterthwaite	4	5
(United Kingdom) W Beamish	6	1	1
(United Kingdom) J Strawson	4	6	6

Fourth round
7	(Germany) C Aussem	6	4	6
(United Kingdom) J Strawson	1	6	1

==== Section 7 ====
First round

Second round
3	(United Kingdom) Eileen Bennett	6	9
(United Kingdom) Dorothy Shepherd-Barron	3	7
(Germany) Irmgard Rost	2	4
(United Kingdom) Mary McIlquham	6	6
(United Kingdom) Agnes Tuckey	2	1
(United Kingdom) JL Colegate	6	6
(Italy) Lucia Valerio	6	6
(United Kingdom) Mrs Bruce-May	3	0

Third round
3	(United Kingdom) E Bennett	6	6
(United Kingdom) M McIlquham	3	3
(United Kingdom) JL Colegate	6	7
(Italy) L Valerio	2	5

Fourth round
3	(United Kingdom) E Bennett	6	6
(United Kingdom) JL Colegate	3	2

==== Section 8 ====
First round

Second round
8	(United States) Helen Jacobs	6	6
(United Kingdom) Joan Ridley	0	2
(United Kingdom) Helen Bourne	4	2
(Australia) Daphne Akhurst	6	6
(France) Yvonne Bourgeois	4	6	4
(United Kingdom) Elsa Haylock	6	4	6
(United Kingdom) Enid Clarke	6	6
Q	(United Kingdom) Beatrice Brown	0	1

Third round
8	(United States) H Jacobs	8	1	6
(Australia) D Akhurst	6	6	8
(United Kingdom) E Haylock	10	6
(United Kingdom) E Clarke	8	0

Fourth round
(Australia) D Akhurst	6	8	6
(United Kingdom) E Haylock	4	10	0

Preceded by 1928 French Championships	Grand Slams; Women's Singles	Succeeded by 1928 U.S. National Championships
