= Gidey =

Gidey is an Ethiopian surname. Notable people with the surname include:

- Letesenbet Gidey (born 1998), Ethiopian long-distance runner
- Tesfay Gidey Hailemichael, Ethiopian National Defense Force general

== See also ==
- Giddey, surname
