= Jean de Gaillard de la Valdène =

French flying ace (1895–1977)

Jean Pierre Marie Joseph de Gaillard de la Valden
- Born: 2 September 1895; Aix-les-Bains, France
- Died: 26 August 1977 (aged 81); Lausanne, Switzerland
- Military career
- Allegiance: France
- Branch: Flying service
- Service years: 1914–1918; World War II
- Rank: Maréchal-des-logis
- Unit: Escadrille MF123, Escadrille 95
- Awards: Médaille militaire, Croix de Guerre

Jean Pierre Marie Joseph de Gaillard de la Valden (2 September 1895 - 26 August 1977) was a French World War I flying ace credited with five aerial victories. He is to be distinguished from comte Léopold de Gaillard de la Valdène (d.1894).

== Biography ==
=== Early life and service ===
Count Jean de Gaillard de la Valdène (sometimes Valden) was born in Tusserve, France on 2 September 1895. He volunteered for military service when World War I erupted. In 1915, he was transferred from the Dragoons to aviation. On 12 July 1915, he qualified for his Military Pilot's Brevet. In 1916 as a corporal he was noted for having shot down an Aviatik near Lure. He was awarded the Médaille Militaire for this feat. Still flying a two-seat reconnaissance aircraft, he shot down two more German planes in 1916.

In early 1918, he was transferred to Escadrille 95, a fighter squadron. He would score two more confirmed victories with this unit, as well as four unconfirmed claims. He ended the war as a Maréchal-des-logis.

=== Later life ===
In the early days of World War II as a lieutenant, he was sent by Admiral Émile Muselier to Algeria and Morocco to recruit aviators willing to continue the war with the Free French Forces.

De Gaillard de la Valdène died in Lausanne, Switzerland on 26 August 1977.

== Personal life ==
He was married to Lilí Álvarez, the Spanish tennis player and feminist, in 1934. She held feminist salons at their house in Bollène. In 1939, the couple lost their only child and soon after separated.

Later he remarried, to Diana Guest of the Guest family, a noted race-horse owner. They had two children, a son and a daughter.

== Honors, awards and citations ==
- Médaille militaire

"Caporal of Escadrille MF123; a pilot of great initiative and very adroit. Always prepared to undertake the most perilous missions. On 14 March 1916, he did not hesitate to engage in combat with three enemy planes, and, although flying a plane inferior in speed, he protected himself from his adversaries by dint of his skill, superior morale and initiative. The battle was terminated by the vertical fall of one enemy plane."

(Médaille militaire citation, 24 May 1916)
