= 1927 French Championships (tennis) =

- Date: 27 May – 5 June 1927
- Edition: 32nd
- Category: 3rd Grand Slam (ITF)
- Surface: Clay
- Location: Saint-Cloud, France
- Venue: Stade Français

Champions

Men's singles
- (France) René Lacoste

Women's singles
- (Netherlands) Kea Bouman

Men's doubles
- (France) Henri Cochet / (France) Jacques Brugnon

Women's doubles
- (South Africa) Irene Peacock / (Australia) Bobbie Heine

Mixed doubles
- (France) Marguerite Broquedis / (France) Jean Borotra
← 1926 ·	French Championships	· 1928 →

The 1927 French Championships (now known as the French Open) was a tennis tournament that took place on the outdoor clay courts at the Stade Français in Saint-Cloud, France. The tournament ran from 27 May until 5 June. It was the 32nd staging of the French Championships and the second Grand Slam tournament of the year.

Kea Bouman and René Lacoste won the singles titles. Bouman became the first foreign woman to win the women's singles event and the first, and to date only, Dutch woman to win a Grand Slam singles title.

== Finals ==
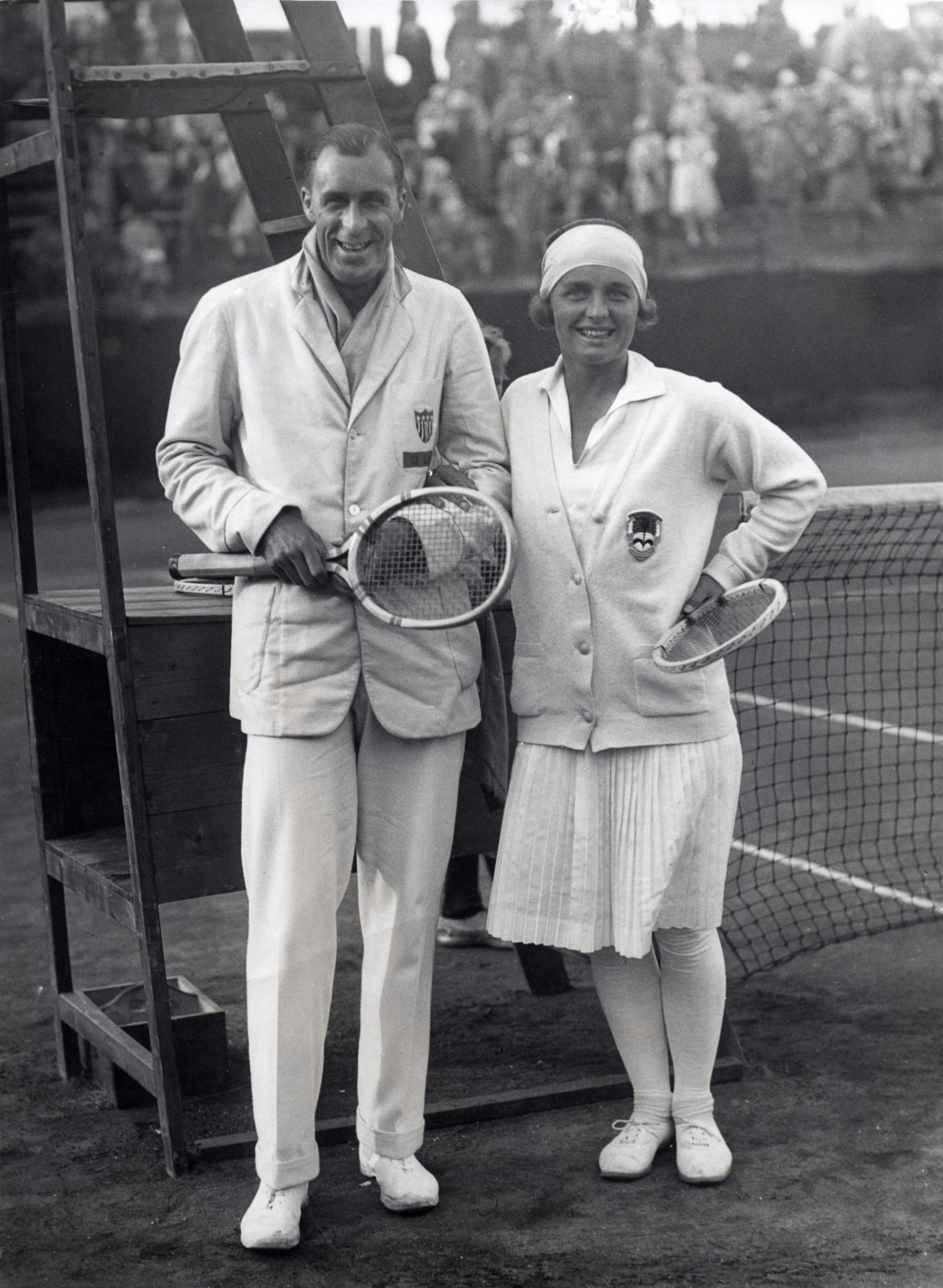
Bill Tilden and Kea Bouman at the 1927 French Championships

=== Men's singles ===
(France) René Lacoste (FRA) defeated (United States) Bill Tilden (USA) 6–4, 4–6, 5–7, 6–3, 11–9

=== Women's singles ===
(Netherlands) Kea Bouman (NED) defeated (South Africa) Irene Peacock (RSA) 6–2, 6–4

=== Men's doubles ===
(France) Henri Cochet (FRA) / (France) Jacques Brugnon (FRA) defeated (France) Jean Borotra (FRA) / (France) René Lacoste (FRA) 2–6, 6–2, 6–0, 1–6, 6–4

=== Women's doubles ===
(South Africa) Irene Peacock (RSA) / (South Africa) Bobbie Heine (AUS) defeated (United Kingdom) Peggy Saunders Mitchell (GBR) / (United Kingdom) Phoebe Holcroft Watson (GBR) 6–2, 6–1

=== Mixed doubles ===
(France) Marguerite Broquedis (FRA) / (France) Jean Borotra (FRA) defeated (Spain) Lilí de Álvarez (ESP) / (United States) Bill Tilden (USA) 6–4, 2–6, 6–2

Preceded by 1927 Australian Championships	Grand Slams	Succeeded by 1927 Wimbledon Championships
