= Suzanne Devé =

French tennis player

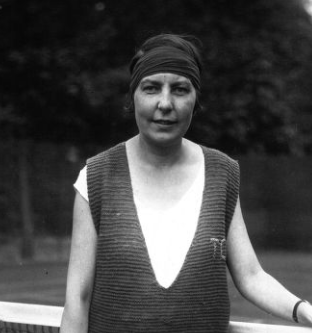
- Devé in 1928
- Country (sports): France
- Born: 14 December 1901 Neuilly-sur-Seine, France
- Died: 12 April 1994 (aged 92) Sceaux, Hauts-de-Seine, France
- Plays: Right-handed

Singles

Grand Slam singles results
- French Open: QF (1924)

Doubles

Grand Slam doubles results
- French Open: F (1930)

Grand Slam mixed doubles results
- French Open: 3R (1930)

Suzanne Devé (14 December 1901 – 12 April 1994), also known by her married name Suzanne Desloges, was a French tennis player who was active in the 1920s.

She reached the doubles final at the 1928 French Championships with compatriot Sylvie Jung Lafaurie in which they lost in straight sets to Eileen Bennett and Phoebe Holcroft from Great Britain. In 1924, the last year the French Championships was closed to foreign players, she reached the quarterfinal of the singles event, losing to Marguerite Broquedis. Her best singles result at the open French Championships was reaching the third round in 1925 and 1927.

In December 1927 Devé won the singles, doubles and mixed doubles titles at the Coupe Georges Gaul. During the second half of the 1920s she represented France in international team matches against the United States, England, Australia and Belgium.

Her favorite stroke was the forehand drive to the right-hand side line. Devé was ranked No. 1 in France for 1928 and was a member of Tennis Club de Paris.

== Grand Slam finals ==
=== Doubles: (1 runner-up) ===
Result	Year	Championship	Surface	Partner	Opponents	Score
Loss	1928	French Championships	Clay	(France) Sylvie Jung Lafaurie	(United Kingdom) Eileen Bennett (United Kingdom) Phoebe Holcroft	0–6, 2–6
