= Norman Giddy =

South African cricketer (1876–1909)

Personal information
- Full name: Norman Hoskins Giddy
- Born: 13 June 1876; King William's Town, Cape Colony
- Died: 28 July 1909 (aged 33); Cape Town, Cape Colony
- Relatives: Lennox Giddy (brother)

Domestic team information
- Years: Team
- 1897–98 to 1903–04: Border

Career statistics
| Competition | First-class |
|---|---|
| Matches | 8 |
| Runs scored | 114 |
| Batting average | 8.14 |
| 100s/50s | 0/0 |
| Top score | 21 |
| Balls bowled | 0 |
| Wickets | – |
| Bowling average | – |
| 5 wickets in innings | – |
| 10 wickets in match | – |
| Best bowling | – |
| Catches/stumpings | 9/– |
- Source: Cricinfo, 11 November 2017

Norman Hoskins Giddy (13 June 1876 – 28 July 1909) was a cricketer who played first-class cricket for Border from 1898 to 1904.

The most notable performance of Giddy's cricket career came in a two-day non-first-class match in January 1899 for a Border XV against Lord Hawke's XI. It was the seventh match of Lord Hawke's XI's tour, and none of the local batsmen in the first six matches had reached 50 in an innings. After Border had made 84 in their first innings and conceded a first-innings lead of 210, Giddy went to the wicket at number nine in the second innings and in three quarters of an hour he made 66, hitting several balls out of the ground, out of a team total of 147.

Giddy worked as a customs clerk in Cape Town, where he died of pneumonia in July 1909, aged 33. He was unmarried.
