= Lennox Giddy =

South African cricketer (1869–1942)

Personal information
- Full name: Lennox Llewellyn Giddy
- Born: 2 May 1869; King William's Town, South Africa
- Died: 16 June 1942 (aged 73); Pretoria, South Africa
- Relatives: Norman Giddy (brother)
- Source: Cricinfo, 17 December 2020

Lennox Llewellyn Giddy (2 May 1869 – 16 June 1942) was a South African cricketer. He played in seven first-class matches for Eastern Province from 1890/91 to 1903/04.

== See also ==
- List of Eastern Province representative cricketers
