= Lilí Álvarez =

Spanish tennis player

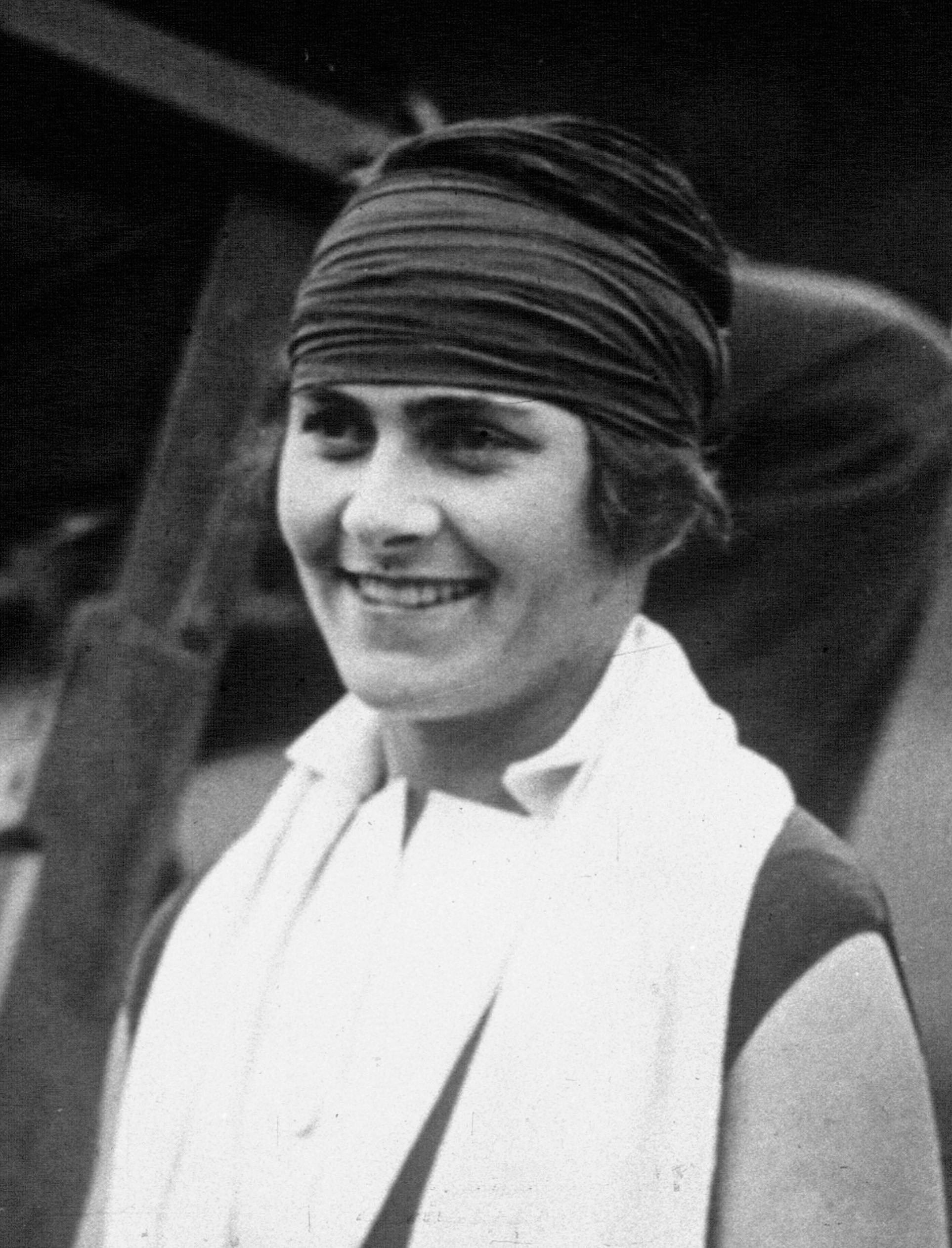
- Lilí Álvarez at the 1926 Wimbledon Championships ladies final
- Full name: Elia Maria González-Álvarez y López-Chicheri
- Country (sports): Spain (−1936); France (1936–)
- Born: 9 May 1905 Rome, Italy
- Died: 8 July 1998 (aged 93) Madrid, Spain
- Plays: Right-handed

Singles
- Highest ranking: No. 2 (1927, A. Wallis Myers)

Grand Slam singles results
- French Open: SF (1930, 1931, 1936, 1937)
- Wimbledon: F (1926, 1927, 1928)

Doubles

Grand Slam doubles results
- French Open: W (1929)
- Wimbledon: 3R (1937)

Grand Slam mixed doubles results
- French Open: F (1927)
- Wimbledon: QF (1926, 1936)

Elia Maria González-Álvarez y López-Chicheri, (Note: Spanish pronunciation: [ˈelja maˈɾi.a ɣonˈθaleθ ˈalβaɾeθ i ˈlopeθ tʃiˈtʃeɾi]) also known as Lilí de Álvarez (Note: She is also known by the names Lilí de Álvarez, Countess Valdène, and Lili de Alvarez. Her book Modern Tennis has sources showing multiple spellings.) (Spanish pronunciation: [liˈli ˈalβaɾeθ]; 9 May 1905 – 8 July 1998), was a Spanish multi-sport competitor, an international tennis champion, an author, feminist and a journalist.

== Life ==
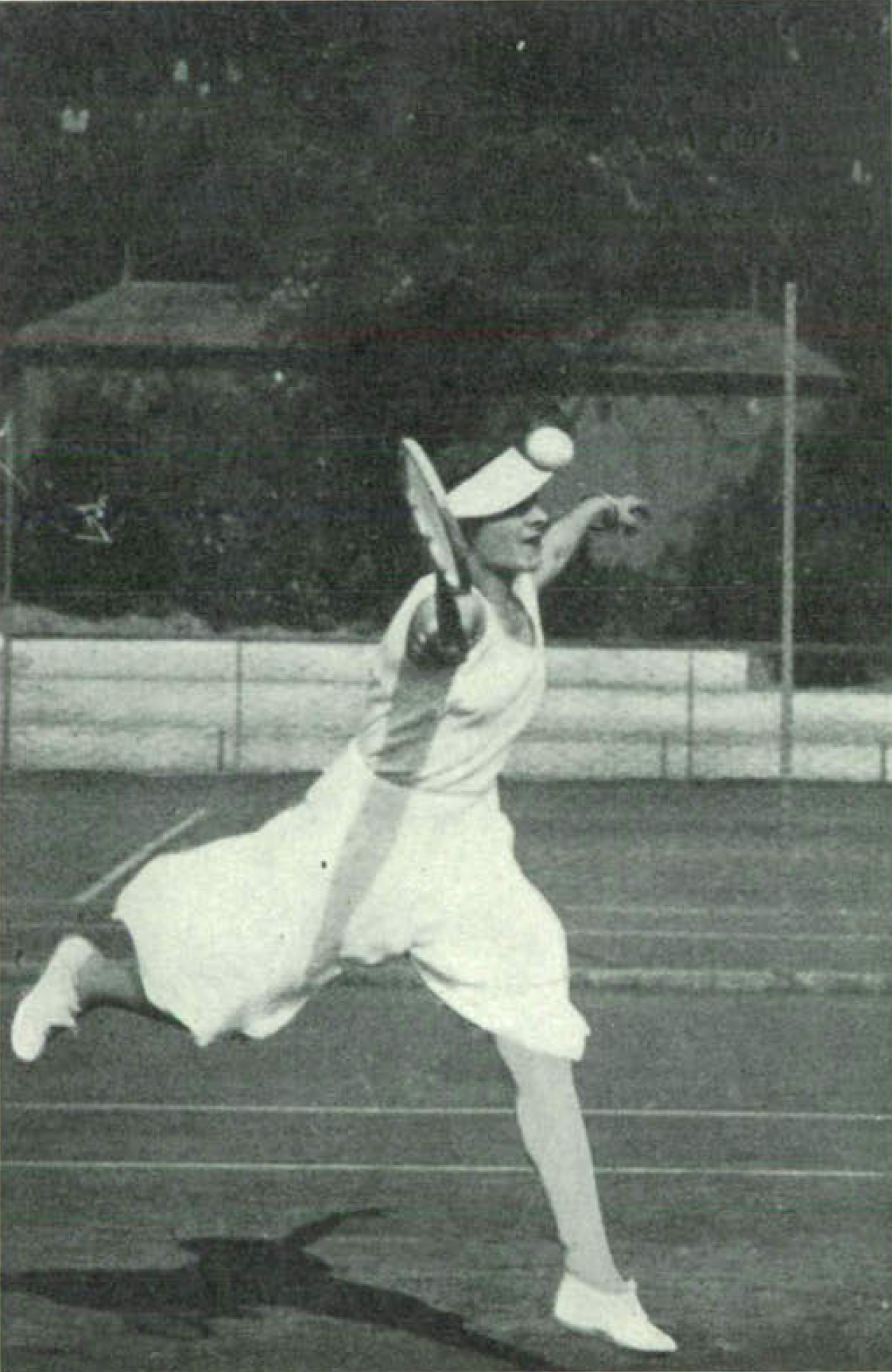
Lilí Álvarez at the 1931 French Championships wearing her controversial "robe-pants"

She was born at the Hotel Flora in Rome, Italy, during a stay by her affluent Spanish parents. She was raised in Switzerland and from an early age began competing in a variety of sports. At age eleven, she won her first ice skating competition, and then at age 16, she won the St. Moritz ice skating championship. She won her first tennis tournament at age fourteen. An all-around sportsperson, Álvarez was an alpine skier, equestrian, and an auto racer who won the Campeonato de Cataluña de Automovilismo at age 19.

Álvarez was a pioneer in women's tennis in Spain and was her country's most dominant player during the 1920s. Between 1926 and 1928, she reached three consecutive singles finals at Wimbledon. According to American Helen Wills Moody, who defeated Álvarez twice in Wimbledon singles finals, Álvarez' game was an "unusually daring one". She also competed at the 1924 Summer Olympics.

In 1929, Álvarez teamed up with the Dutch player Kea Bouman to win the women's doubles title at the French Championships. The following year, Álvarez won the singles title at the Italian Championships, an accomplishment that was not repeated by another female Spaniard for 63 years until Conchita Martínez won the Italian Open in 1993. Álvarez and Bill Tilden were the runners-up in the mixed doubles competition at the 1927 French Championships.

In 1927, Álvarez authored a book in English published in London under the title Modern Lawn Tennis.

In 1931, she shocked the staid tennis world by playing at Wimbledon in a divided tennis skirt specially made by designer Elsa Schiaparelli that was the forerunner of shorts (pictured). That year, Álvarez began reporting on the political events in Spain for the British newspaper the Daily Mail.

According to Wallis Myers of The Daily Telegraph and the Daily Mail, Álvarez was ranked in the world top 10 from 1926 through 1928 and in 1930 and 1931, reaching a career high of World No. 2 in those rankings in 1927 and 1928.

In 1934, Álvarez married Jean de Gaillard de la Valdène, the Count of Valdene, a French aristocrat and diplomat, and from 1936 she played for three years on the international tennis circuit as "Countess Valdène". In 1939, she lost her only child and the couple soon separated. She returned home to Spain in 1941 where she continued to be active in sports and began writing on religious and feminist topics, publishing her book Plenitud (Fullness) in 1946. She actively supported the worldwide feminist movement and in 1951 gave a speech entitled "La batalla de la feminidad" at the Hispanic-American Feminist Congress. Over the years, she wrote several more books.

When asked in 1993 about modern Spanish tennis, Álvarez favored a combative and bold playing style rather than a defensive and thus negative conception and criticized the lack of fast courts in the country, claiming that no champions can be born on clay court. She was disappointed that Sergi Bruguera didn't take part in Wimbledon after winning Roland Garros and showed enthusiasm for Conchita Martínez's Wimbledon semifinals run, noting that while she had previously shown talent it was the first time she had shown a champion's disposition.

Álvarez died in Madrid in 1998.

== Grand Slam finals ==
=== Singles (3 runner-ups) ===
Result	Year	Championship	Surface	Opponent	Score
Loss	1926	Wimbledon	Grass	(United Kingdom) Kitty McKane Godfree	2–6, 6–4, 3–6
Loss	1927	Wimbledon (2)	Grass	(United States) Helen Wills	2–6, 4–6
Loss	1928	Wimbledon (3)	Grass	(United States) Helen Wills	2–6, 3–6

=== Doubles (1 title) ===
Result	Year	Championship	Surface	Partner	Opponents	Score
Win	1929	French Championships	Clay	(Netherlands) Kea Bouman	(South Africa) Bobbie Heine (South Africa) Alida Neave	7–5, 6–3

=== Mixed doubles (1 runner-up) ===
Result	Year	Championship	Surface	Partner	Opponents	Score
Loss	1927	French Championships	Clay	(United States) Bill Tilden	(France) Marguerite Broquedis (France) Jean Borotra	4–6, 6–2, 2–6

== Grand Slam singles tournament timeline ==
Key
W	F	SF	QF	#R	RR	Q#	DNQ	A	NH

(W) winner; (F) finalist; (SF) semifinalist; (QF) quarterfinalist; (#R) rounds 4, 3, 2, 1; (RR) round-robin stage; (Q#) qualification round; (DNQ) did not qualify; (A) absent; (NH) not held; (SR) strike rate (events won / competed); (W–L) win–loss record.

Tournament	1925	1926	1927	1928	1929	1930	1931	1932	1933	1934	1935	1936	1937	Career SR
Australian Championships	A	A	A	A	A	A	A	A	A	A	A	A	A	0 / 0
French Championships	1R	A	QF	A	A	SF	SF	3R	A	A	1R	SF	SF	0 / 8
Wimbledon	A	F	F	F	4R	1R	3R	A	A	A	2R	4R	4R	0 / 9
U.S. Championships	A	A	A	A	A	A	A	A	A	A	A	A	A	0 / 0
SR	0 / 1	0 / 1	0 / 2	0 / 1	0 / 1	0 / 2	0 / 2	0 / 1	0 / 0	0 / 0	0 / 2	0 / 2	0 / 2	0 / 17

== See also ==
- Performance timelines for all female tennis players since 1978 who reached at least one Grand Slam final
