= Alida Neave =

South African tennis player

- Country (sports): South Africa

Singles

Grand Slam singles results
- French Open: QF (1929)
- Wimbledon: 1R (1929)

Doubles

Grand Slam doubles results
- French Open: F (1929)
- Wimbledon: 1R (1929)

Alida Neave is a South African former tennis player.

Neave reached the doubles final at the 1929 French Championships with compatriot Bobbie Heine Miller but were defeated in the final by Lili de Alvarez and Kea Bouman in two straight sets. In 1937, she made the singles final of the South African Championships but lost in three sets to Bobbie Heine Miller.

== Grand Slam finals ==
=== Doubles (1 runner-up) ===
Result	Year	Championship	Surface	Partner	Opponents	Score
Loss	1929	French Championships	Clay	(South Africa) Bobbie Heine Miller	(Spain) Lilí de Álvarez (Netherlands) Kea Bouman	5–7, 3–6
