= Phoebe Holcroft Watson =

British tennis player (1898–1980)

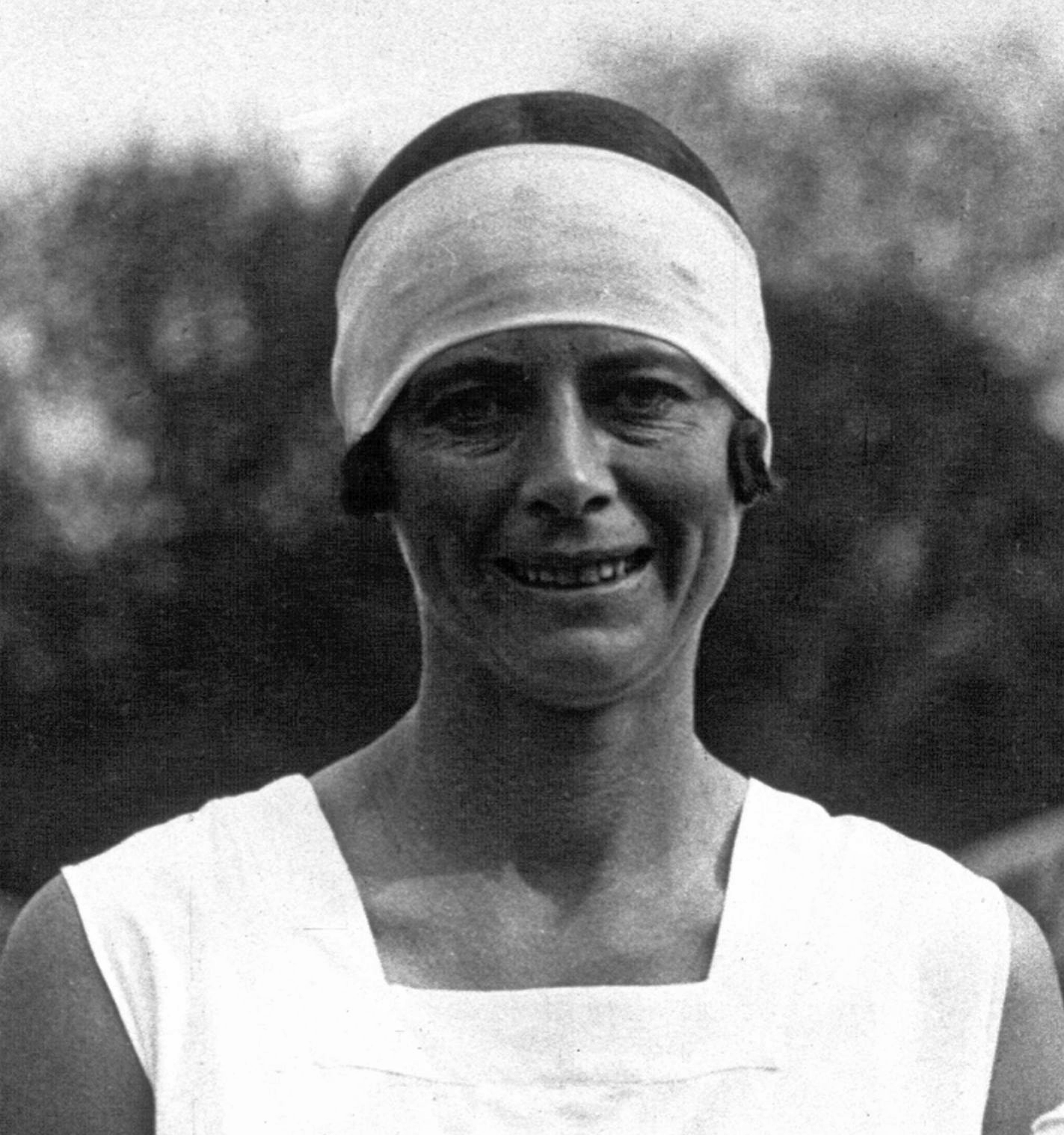
- Full name: Phoebe Catherine Holcroft Watson
- Country (sports): United Kingdom
- Born: 7 October 1898
- Died: 20 October 1980 (aged 82)

Singles
- Highest ranking: No. 2 (1929)

Grand Slam singles results
- French Open: QF (1929, 1930)
- Wimbledon: QF (1927, 1928)
- US Open: F (1929)

Doubles

Grand Slam doubles results
- French Open: W (1928)
- Wimbledon: W (1928, 1929)
- US Open: W (1929)

Grand Slam mixed doubles results
- Wimbledon: SF (1927)
- US Open: SF (1930)

Team competitions
- Wightman Cup: W (1928, 1930)

Phoebe Catherine Holcroft Watson (née Holcroft; 7 October 1898 – 20 October 1980) was a tennis player from the United Kingdom whose best result in singles was reaching the final of the U.S. Championships in 1929, losing to Helen Wills in straight sets. According to A. Wallis Myers, Watson was ranked in the world top 10 in 1926 and from 1928 through 1930, reaching a career high of world No. 2 in 1929.

Watson won the women's doubles title at Wimbledon in 1928 and 1929 and at the US Championships in 1929, all with partner Peggy Saunders Michell. Her other Grand Slam title was the women's doubles at the French Championships in 1928 with partner Eileen Bennett.

She was part of the British team that won the Wightman Cup against the United States in 1928 and 1930.

== Grand Slam finals ==
=== Singles: 1 (1 runner-up) ===
Result	Year	Championship	Surface	Opponent	Score
Loss	1929	U.S. Championships	Grass	(United States) Helen Wills	4–6, 2–6

=== Doubles: 5 (4 titles, 1 runners-up) ===
Result	Year	Championship	Surface	Partner	Opponents	Score
Loss	1927	French Championships	Clay	(United Kingdom) Peggy Saunders Michell	(South Africa) Irene Bowder Peacock (South Africa) Bobbie Heine	2–6, 1–6
Win	1928	French Championships	Clay	(United Kingdom) Eileen Bennett	(France) Suzanne Devé (France) Sylvie Jung	6–0, 6–2
Win	1928	Wimbledon	Grass	(United Kingdom) Peggy Saunders Michell	(United Kingdom) Ermyntrude Harvey (United Kingdom) Eileen Bennett	6–2, 6–3
Win	1929	Wimbledon	Grass	(United Kingdom) Peggy Saunders Michell	(United Kingdom) Phyllis Covell (United Kingdom) Dorothy Shepherd	6–4, 8–6
Win	1929	US National Championships	Grass	(United Kingdom) Peggy Saunders Michell	(United Kingdom) Phyllis Covell (United Kingdom) Dorothy Shepherd	2–6, 6–3, 6–4

== Grand Slam singles tournament timeline ==
Key
W	F	SF	QF	#R	RR	Q#	DNQ	A	NH

(W) winner; (F) finalist; (SF) semifinalist; (QF) quarterfinalist; (#R) rounds 4, 3, 2, 1; (RR) round-robin stage; (Q#) qualification round; (DNQ) did not qualify; (A) absent; (NH) not held; (SR) strike rate (events won / competed); (W–L) win–loss record.

Tournament	1923	1924	1925	1926	1927	1928	1929	1930	Career SR
Australia	A	A	A	A	A	A	A	A	0 / 0
France^{1}	A	NH	A	A	3R	2R	QF	QF	0 / 4
Wimbledon	1R	3R	1R	3R	QF	QF	3R	1R	0 / 8
United States	A	A	A	A	A	A	F	A	0 / 1
SR	0 / 1	0 / 1	0 / 1	0 / 1	0 / 2	0 / 2	0 / 3	0 / 2	0 / 13

^{1}Until 1923, the French Championships were open only to French nationals. The World Hard Court Championships (WHCC), actually played on clay in Paris or Brussels, began in 1912 and were open to all nationalities. The results from the 1923 edition of that tournament are shown here. The Olympics replaced the WHCC in 1924, as the Olympics were held in Paris. Beginning in 1925, the French Championships were open to all nationalities, with the results shown here beginning with that year.

== See also ==
- Performance timelines for all female tennis players since 1978 who reached at least one Grand Slam final
