= Kea Bouman =

Dutch tennis player (1903–1998)

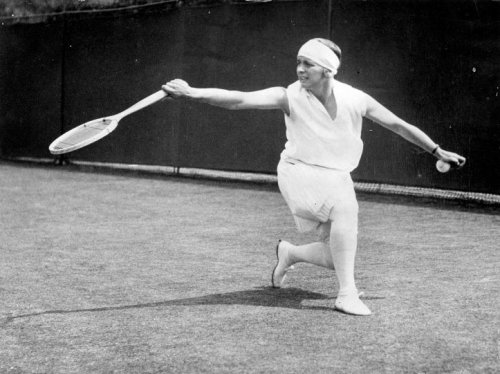
- Kea Bouman (1929)
- Full name: Cornelia Bouman
- Country (sports): Netherlands
- Born: 23 November 1903 Almelo, Netherlands
- Died: 17 November 1998 (aged 94) Delden, Netherlands
- Retired: 1930
- Plays: Right-handed

Singles
- Highest ranking: No.8 (1928)

Grand Slam singles results
- French Open: W (1927)
- Wimbledon: QF (1926)
- US Open: QF (1927)

Grand Slam doubles results
- French Open: W (1929)
- Wimbledon: QF (1928, 1929)

Grand Slam mixed doubles results
- French Open: 3R (1929)
- Wimbledon: QF (1929)
Medal record
Olympic Games
Bronze medal – third place	1924 Paris	Mixed doubles

Cornelia "Kea" Tiedemann-Bouman (23 November 1903 – 17 November 1998) was a tennis player from the Netherlands. She won the singles title at the 1927 French Championships, beating Irene Bowder Peacock of South Africa in the final. Bouman was the first and, to this date, the only Dutch woman who has won a Grand Slam singles title.

Bouman additionally won the 1923, 1924, 1925 and 1926 Dutch national tennis championship (singles).

Born in Almelo, Bouman is also the first female Dutch athlete to win an Olympic medal in any sport, when she teamed with Hendrik Timmer to win bronze in mixed doubles at the 1924 Summer Olympics in Paris.

In October 1927 Bouman won the singles title of the inaugural edition of the Pacific Southwest Tennis Championship, defeating Molla Mallory in the final in three sets. In 1929, Bouman teamed with Spain's Lilí Álvarez to win the women's doubles title at the French Championships, precursor of the French Open.

According to A. Wallis Myers of The Daily Telegraph and the Daily Mail, Bouman was ranked in the world top 10 in 1927 and 1928, reaching a career high of world no. 8 in those rankings in 1928.

Bouman was successful in other sports as well. She became the Dutch national champion in golf and played for the national field hockey team.

On 27 January 1931 she married Ir. Wilhelm Tiedemann in Almelo, and shortly afterwards the couple emigrated to Dutch East Indies where they lived for nine years and where Tiedemann worked as a geologist. She also lived in the United States.

Bouman died in Delden, Netherlands, four days after her doubles partner Henk Timmer.

== Grand Slam finals ==
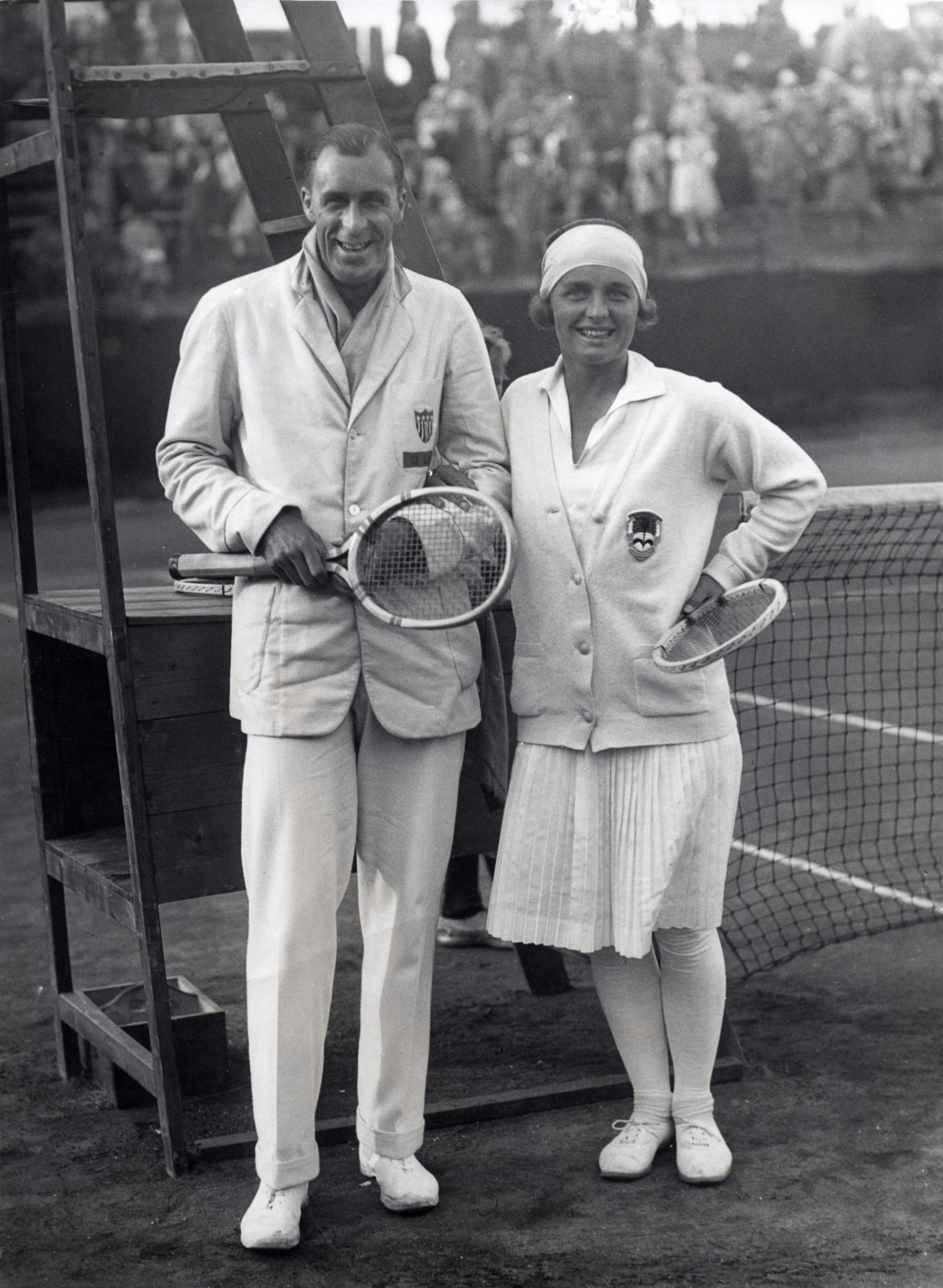
Bill Tilden and Kea Bouman at the 1927 French Championships

=== Singles (1 title) ===
Result	Year	Championship	Surface	Opponent	Score
Win	1927	French Championships	Clay	(South Africa) Irene Bowder Peacock	6–2, 6–4

=== Doubles (1 title) ===
Result	Year	Championship	Surface	Partner	Opponents	Score
Win	1929	French Championships	Clay	(Spain) Lilí Álvarez	(South Africa) Bobbie Heine (South Africa) Alida Neave	7–5, 6–3

== Grand Slam singles tournament timeline ==
Key
W	F	SF	QF	#R	RR	Q#	DNQ	A	NH

(W) winner; (F) finalist; (SF) semifinalist; (QF) quarterfinalist; (#R) rounds 4, 3, 2, 1; (RR) round-robin stage; (Q#) qualification round; (DNQ) did not qualify; (A) absent; (NH) not held; (SR) strike rate (events won / competed); (W–L) win–loss record.

Tournament	1923	1924	1925	1926	1927	1928	1929	Career SR
Australian Championships	A	A	A	A	A	A	A	0 / 0
French Championships^{1}	A	NH	A	SF	W	SF	1R	1 / 4
Wimbledon	2R	1R	2R	QF	4R	3R	3R	0 / 7
U.S. Championships	A	A	A	A	QF	A	A	0 / 1
SR	0 / 1	0 / 1	0 / 1	0 / 2	1 / 3	0 / 2	0 / 2	1 / 12

^{1}Through 1923, the French Championships were open only to French nationals. The World Hard Court Championships (WHCC), actually played on clay in Paris or Brussels, began in 1912 and were open to all nationalities. The results from the 1923 edition of that tournament are shown here. The Olympics replaced the WHCC in 1924, as the Olympics were held in Paris. Beginning in 1925, the French Championships were open to all nationalities, with the results shown here beginning with that year.

== See also ==
- Performance timelines for all female tennis players since 1978 who reached at least one Grand Slam final
