= Billie Tapscott =

South African tennis player

- Full name: Daphne Ruth Tapscott Robbins
- Country (sports): South Africa
- Born: 31 May 1903
- Died: 1970
- Plays: Right-handed

Singles

Grand Slam singles results
- French Open: QF (1927)
- Wimbledon: QF (1929)

Doubles

Grand Slam doubles results
- Wimbledon: 2R (1927, 1929)

Grand Slam mixed doubles results
- French Open: QF (1927)
- Wimbledon: 2R (1927)

Daphne Ruth "Billie" Tapscott (31 May 1903 – 1970) was a South African female tennis player. She was born in Kimberley, Cape Colony. In 1930 she married South African tennis player Colin Robbins.

Her best singles performance at a Grand Slam event was reaching the quarterfinals of the 1927 French Championships in which she lost to eventual winner Kea Bouman in straight sets and the 1929 Wimbledon Championships losing at the same stage to Elsie Goldsack.

She caused some furor at Wimbledon in 1927 when she played without stockings, the first time a woman had done so. She wore white socks instead.

In 1929 she was a runner–up at the singles event of the Irish Open, losing in the final in three sets to compatriot Bobbie Heine Miller. Tapscott won the South African Championships singles title in 1930, 1933, 1934 and 1938.

Her brothers Lionel and George were both cricketers who played in Test matches for South Africa.
