= Irene Bowder Peacock =

South African tennis player

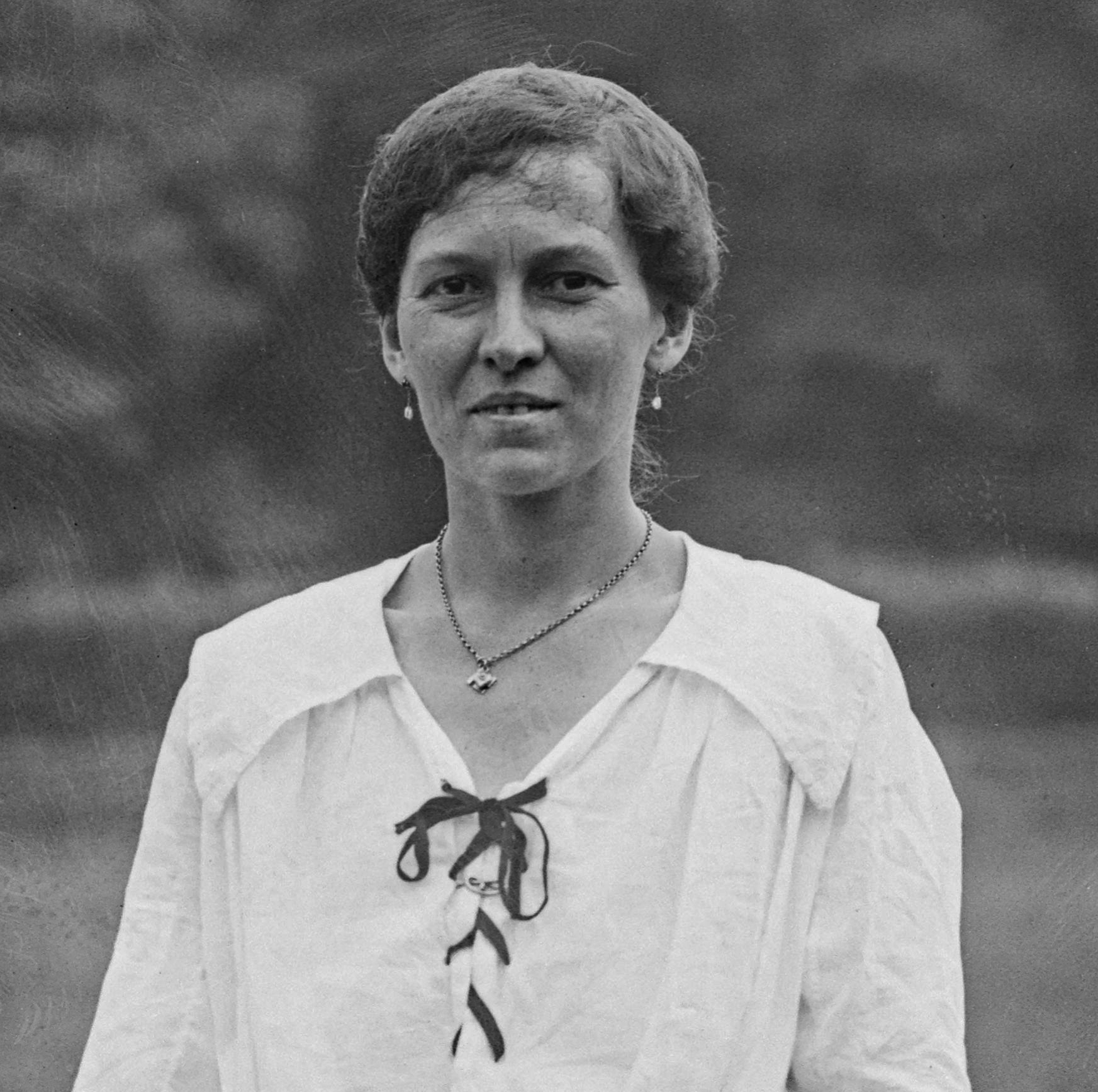
- Full name: Irene Evelyn Bowder Peacock
- Country (sports): South Africa
- Born: 27 July 1892 Ferozepore, British India
- Died: 13 June 1978 (aged 85) Johannesburg, South Africa

Singles
- Highest ranking: No.6 (1922)

Grand Slam singles results
- French Open: F (1927)
- Wimbledon: SF (1921, 1922)

Doubles

Grand Slam doubles results
- French Open: W (1927)
- Wimbledon: F (1921, 1927)

Other doubles tournaments
- WHCC: F (1921)
- WCCC: F (1920)

Grand Slam mixed doubles results
- Wimbledon: QF (1921, 1927)

Other mixed doubles tournaments
- WCCC: W (1920)

Irene Evelyn Bowder Peacock (née Bowder; 27 July 1892 – 13 June 1978) was a South African tennis player.

Bowder Peacock won the doubles title at the 1927 French Championships with Bobbie Heine Miller defeating Peggy Saunders and Phoebe Holcroft Watson in two straight sets. That same tournament she also reached the final of the singles competition which she lost in straight sets to Kea Bouman of the Netherlands. She won the British Indian Championships singles title from 1915 to 1920, the South of England Championships singles title in 1922, and the South African Championships singles title from 1924 to 1926.

At the World Covered Court Championships in 1920 she was a finalist in the doubles and, partnering Francis Fisher, won the mixed doubles title after a walkover in the final against Stanley Doust and Kathleen McKane Godfree. In 1921 she won the mixed doubles at the Queen's Covered Court Championships, again teaming up with Fisher, but lost the final of the singles event to Edith Holman.

She captained the South African women's team that toured Europe in 1927 and together with Heine Miller won the doubles title at the Queen's Club Championships. Bowder Peacock and Heine Miller missed the 1930 Wimbledon Championships due to a scheduling disagreement with the South African Lawn Tennis Union.

== Grand Slam finals ==
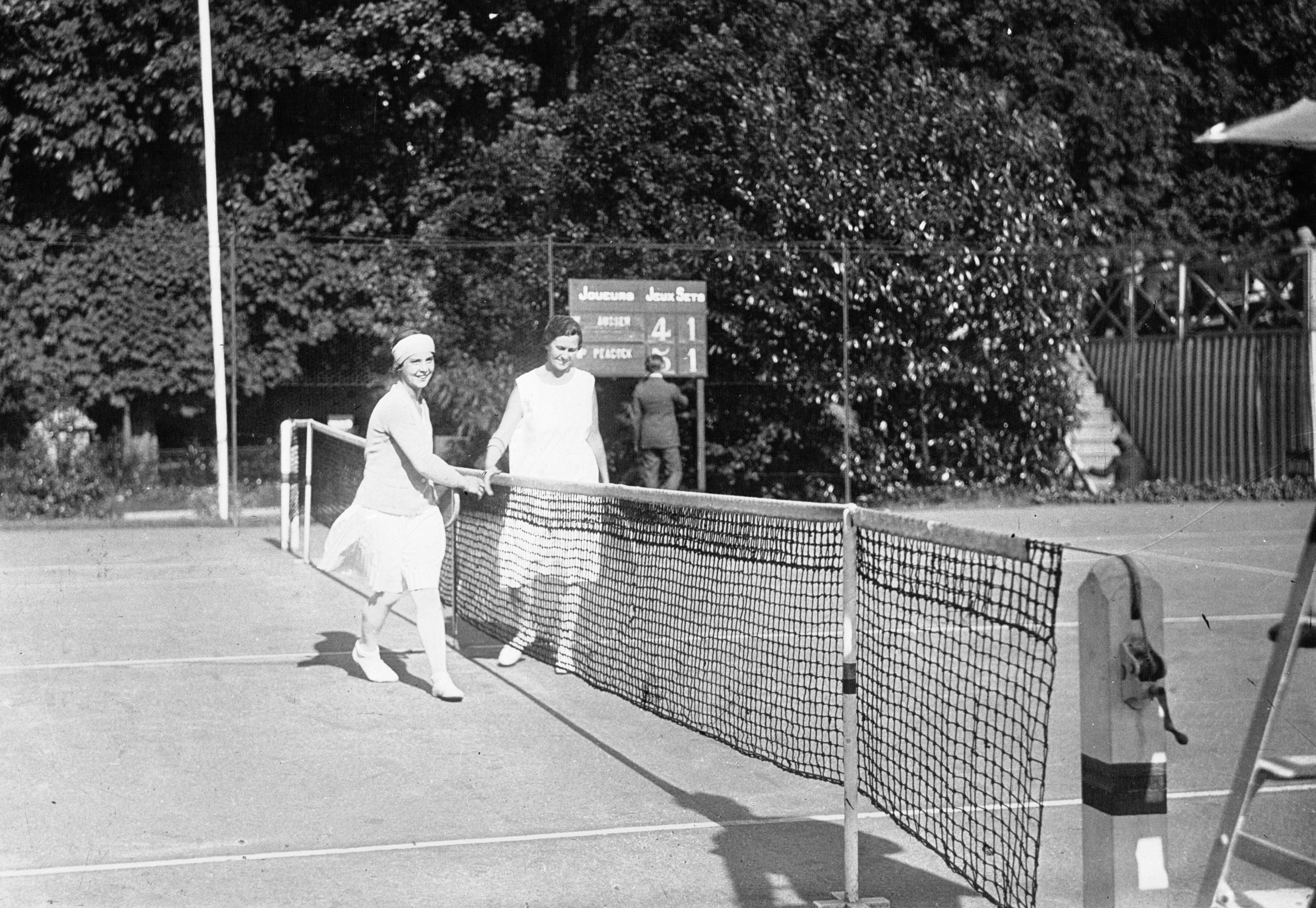
Peacock (right) at the 1927 French Championships after a victory in the quarterfinal against Cilly Aussem

=== Singles (1 runner-up) ===
Result	Year	Championship	Surface	Opponent	Score
Loss	1927	French Championships	Clay	(Netherlands) Kea Bouman	2–6, 4–6

=== Doubles (1 title, 2 runner-ups) ===
Result	Year	Championship	Surface	Partner	Opponents	Score
Loss	1921	Wimbledon	Grass	(United Kingdom) Geraldine Beamish	(France) Suzanne Lenglen (United States) Elizabeth Ryan	1–6, 2–6
Win	1927	French Championships	Clay	(South Africa) Bobbie Heine	(United Kingdom) Peggy Mitchell (United Kingdom) Phoebe Watson	6–2, 6–1
Loss	1927	Wimbledon	Gras	(South Africa) Bobbie Heine	(United States) Helen Wills (United States) Elizabeth Ryan	3–6, 2–6

== World championships finals ==
=== Mixed doubles (1 title) ===
Result	Year	Championship	Surface	Partner	Opponents	Score
Win	1920	World Covered Court Championships	Wood	(New Zealand) Frank Fisher	(Australia) Stanley Doust (United Kingdom) Kitty McKane	walkover
