= 1925 Wimbledon Championships – Mixed doubles =

Mixed doubles
- 1925 Wimbledon Championships

Final
- Champions: (France) Jean Borotra (France) Suzanne Lenglen
- Runners-up: (Italy) Uberto de Morpurgo (United States) Elizabeth Ryan
- Score: 6–3, 6–3

Details
- Draw: 64 (4Q)
- Seeds: –

Events
Singles	men	women		boys	girls
Doubles	men	women	mixed	boys	girls
- Wimbledon Championships

Brian Gilbert and Kitty McKane were the defending champions, but lost in the quarterfinals to eventual champions Jean Borotra and Suzanne Lenglen.

Borotra and Lenglen defeated Uberto de Morpurgo and Elizabeth Ryan in the final, 6–3, 6–3 to win the mixed doubles tennis title at the 1925 Wimbledon Championships.

== Draw ==
Key

- Q = Qualifier
- WC = Wild card
- LL = Lucky loser
- Alt = Alternate
- ITF = ITF entry
- PR = Protected ranking
- SR = Special ranking
- SE = Special exempt
- JE = Junior exempt
- JR = Junior Accelerator Programme entrant
- CO = College Accelerator Programme entrant
- NG = Next Gen Accelerator Program entrant
- w/o = Walkover
- r = Retired
- d = Defaulted

=== Finals ===
Quarterfinals
(United Kingdom) Patrick Wheatley (United Kingdom) Dorothea Lambert Chambers	3	6	6
(Belgium) Jean Washer (United Kingdom) Phyllis Satterthwaite	6	2	4
(Italy) Uberto de Morpurgo (United States) Elizabeth Ryan	6	6
(United Kingdom) Arthur Berger (United Kingdom) Joan Reid-Thomas	4	3
(United Kingdom) Cyril Eames (United Kingdom) Winifred Beamish	6	2	6
(United Kingdom) Randolph Lycett (United Kingdom) Joan Lycett	0	6	8
(France) Jean Borotra (France) Suzanne Lenglen	6	6
(United Kingdom) Brian Gilbert (United Kingdom) Kitty McKane	1	2

Semifinals
(United Kingdom) Patrick Wheatley (United Kingdom) Dorothea Lambert Chambers	7	4
(Italy) Uberto de Morpurgo (United States) Elizabeth Ryan	9	6
(United Kingdom) Randolph Lycett (United Kingdom) Joan Lycett	4	7	3
(France) Jean Borotra (France) Suzanne Lenglen	6	5	6

Final
(Italy) Uberto de Morpurgo (United States) Elizabeth Ryan	3	3
(France) Jean Borotra (France) Suzanne Lenglen	6	6

=== Top half ===
==== Section 1 ====
First round
(United Kingdom) Patrick Wheatley (United Kingdom) Dorothea Lambert Chambers	9	6
(United Kingdom) WHM Aitken (United Kingdom) Mildred Coles	7	0
(United Kingdom) Frank Jarvis (United Kingdom) Sylvia Lumley-Ellis	3	5
(Netherlands) Cornelis Bryan (Netherlands) Mence Canters	6	7
(United Kingdom) Keats Lester (United Kingdom) Joan Fry	6	6
(United Kingdom) DL Craig; Mrs K Buchanan	1	0
(South Africa) Gerald Sherwell (United Kingdom) JL Colegate	6	6
(India) Syed Mohammad Hadi; Mrs Heathcote	4	2
(United Kingdom) Charles Kingsley (United Kingdom) Eileen Bennett	7	6
Q	(United Kingdom) Laddie Wheatcroft (United Kingdom) Cristobel Hardie	5	2
(United Kingdom) Ernest Lamb (United States) Anna Harper	4	7	6
(Sweden) Carl-Erik von Braun (United Kingdom) Hilary Stebbing	6	5	2
(United Kingdom) Vincent Burr (United Kingdom) Agnes Tuckey	3	1
(France) Henri Cochet (France) Marguerite Billout	6	6
(Belgium) Jean Washer (United Kingdom) Phyllis Satterthwaite	10	8
(United States) Ernest Jonklaas (United Kingdom) Kathleen Bridge	8	6

Second round
(United Kingdom) P Wheatley (United Kingdom) D Lambert Chambers	6	7
(Netherlands) C Bryan (Netherlands) M Canters	2	5
(United Kingdom) K Lester (United Kingdom) J Fry	5	6	2
(South Africa) G Sherwell (United Kingdom) JL Colegate	7	1	6
(United Kingdom) C Kingsley (United Kingdom) E Bennett	2	5
(United Kingdom) E Lamb (United States) A Harper	6	7
(France) H Cochet (France) M Billout	6	10	4
(Belgium) J Washer (United Kingdom) P Satterthwaite	2	12	6

Third round
(United Kingdom) P Wheatley (United Kingdom) D Lambert Chambers	8	6
(South Africa) G Sherwell (United Kingdom) JL Colegate	6	4
(United Kingdom) E Lamb (United States) A Harper	2	2
(Belgium) J Washer (United Kingdom) P Satterthwaite	6	6

Quarterfinals
(United Kingdom) P Wheatley (United Kingdom) D Lambert Chambers	3	6	6
(Belgium) J Washer (United Kingdom) P Satterthwaite	6	2	4

The nationalities of Mrs K Buchanan and Mrs Heathcote are unknown.

==== Section 2 ====
First round
(United Kingdom) Maurice Summerson (United Kingdom) R Watson	2	1
(South Africa) Pat Spence (United Kingdom) Evelyn Colyer	6	6
(New Zealand) William Melody (New Zealand) Mrs WJ Melody	2	2
(India) Sydney Jacob (South Africa) Millicent Pitt	6	6
(United Kingdom) Gordon Crole-Rees (United Kingdom) Ermyntrude Harvey	4	3
(Italy) Uberto de Morpurgo (United States) Elizabeth Ryan	6	6
(United Kingdom) Leslie Godfree (United Kingdom) Mabel Clayton	1	5
(Australia) Rodney Heath (Australia) Esna Boyd	6	7
(United Kingdom) Charles Roupell (United Kingdom) Mrs HB Weston	5	5
(United Kingdom) GR Ashton (United Kingdom) Eleanor Rose	7	7
(Republic of Ireland) Charles Scroope (Republic of Ireland) Mrs MP Tomlinson	3	4
(United Kingdom) Arthur Berger (United Kingdom) Joan Reid-Thomas	6	6
(United Kingdom) Francis Stowe (United Kingdom) Beatrice Brown	6	4	3
(United Kingdom) Lewis Michell (United Kingdom) Peggy Saunders	4	6	6
(United Kingdom) Bill Swinden (United Kingdom) Mrs Bruce-May	4	6	6
(United Kingdom) HF Hunt (United Kingdom) EM Beckingham	6	4	3

Second round
(South Africa) P Spence (United Kingdom) E Colyer	6	6
(India) S Jacob (South Africa) M Pitt	4	4
(Italy) H de Morpurgo (United States) E Ryan	6	6
(Australia) R Heath (Australia) E Boyd	2	2
(United Kingdom) GR Ashton (United Kingdom) E Rose	3	0
(United Kingdom) A Berger (United Kingdom) J Reid-Thomas	6	6
(United Kingdom) L Michell (United Kingdom) M Saunders	6	4	8
(United Kingdom) W Swinden (United Kingdom) Mrs Bruce-May	3	6	10

Third round
(South Africa) P Spence (United Kingdom) E Colyer	4	5
(Italy) H de Morpurgo (United States) E Ryan	6	7
(United Kingdom) A Berger (United Kingdom) J Reid-Thomas	6	3	6
(United Kingdom) W Swinden (United Kingdom) Mrs Bruce-May	3	6	0

Quarterfinals
(Italy) H de Morpurgo (United States) E Ryan	6	6
(United Kingdom) A Berger (United Kingdom) J Reid-Thomas	4	3

=== Bottom half ===
==== Section 3 ====
First round
(United Kingdom) Nigel Sharpe (Australia) Daphne Akhurst	2	1
(United Kingdom) Cyril Eames (United Kingdom) Winifred Beamish	6	6
(United Kingdom) GTC Watt (United Kingdom) Dorothy Hill	3	3
(Malaysia) ENW Oliver (United Kingdom) Enid Clarke	6	6
(United Kingdom) Cecil Tindell-Green (United Kingdom) Vera Youle	4	4
(United Kingdom) George Fletcher (United Kingdom) PM Radcliffe	6	6
(United Kingdom) Ambrose Dudley (United Kingdom) Claire Beckingham	6	2	2
(United Kingdom) Clinton McIlquham (United Kingdom) Mary McIlquham	3	6	6
Q	(United Kingdom) JG Hogan (United Kingdom) Irene Maltby	6	10
(United Kingdom) Fassett Burnett (United Kingdom) Cecily Marriott	3	8
(United Kingdom) Randolph Lycett (United Kingdom) Joan Lycett	6	6
(Brazil) Nelson Cruz (South Africa) Mrs WG Lowe	3	3
(United Kingdom) CH Watson (United Kingdom) Gwen Sterry	6	7
(New Zealand) Frank Fisher (United Kingdom) Doris Craddock	1	5
(United Kingdom) Alfred Ingram (United Kingdom) Peggy Pleydell-Bouverie	7	9
(United Kingdom) Cyril Eltringham (United Kingdom) Naomi Jackson-Feilden	5	7

Second round
(United Kingdom) C Eames (United Kingdom) W Beamish	6	6
(Malaysia) ENW Oliver (United Kingdom) E Clarke	1	1
(United Kingdom) G Fletcher (United Kingdom) PM Radcliffe	6	5	6
(United Kingdom) C McIlquham (United Kingdom) M McIlquham	2	7	0
Q	(United Kingdom) JG Hogan (United Kingdom) I Maltby	3	7
(United Kingdom) R Lycett (United Kingdom) J Lycett	6	9
(United Kingdom) CH Watson (United Kingdom) G Sterry	10	3	1
(United Kingdom) A Ingram (United Kingdom) M Pleydell-Bouverie	8	6	6

Third round
(United Kingdom) C Eames (United Kingdom) W Beamish	6	3	6
(United Kingdom) G Fletcher (United Kingdom) PM Radcliffe	2	6	2
(United Kingdom) R Lycett (United Kingdom) J Lycett	8	10
(United Kingdom) A Ingram (United Kingdom) M Pleydell-Bouverie	6	8

Quarterfinals
(United Kingdom) C Eames (United Kingdom) W Beamish	6	2	6
(United Kingdom) R Lycett (United Kingdom) J Lycett	0	6	8

==== Section 4 ====
First round
(United Kingdom) St John Evers (United Kingdom) Mabel Mavrogordato	0	6
(United Kingdom) Jack Hillyard (United Kingdom) Marie Hazel	6	8
(United Kingdom) Roy Poland (United Kingdom) CJ Tyrrell	6	5	6
(United Kingdom) Harold Aitken (United Kingdom) Betty Dix	1	7	4
(France) Jean Borotra (France) Suzanne Lenglen	6	6
(United Kingdom) RDN Pryce-Jones (United Kingdom) Enid Head	2	1
(Netherlands) Hendrik Timmer (Netherlands) Kea Bouman	6	6
Q	(United Kingdom) ME Nigel-Jones (United Kingdom) BG Morrison	1	3
(United Kingdom) Reginald Knight (United Kingdom) Norah Middleton	1	4
(United Kingdom) Brian Gilbert (United Kingdom) Kitty McKane	6	6
(New Zealand) JA Fotheringham (United Kingdom) Doreen Busby	8	6
Q	(United Kingdom) WT Tucker (United Kingdom) Louise Bull	6	4
(United Kingdom) Royden Dash (United Kingdom) Phoebe Watson	6	6
(Australia) Harold Utz (Australia) Lorna Utz	3	0
(South Africa) Julien Lezard (United Kingdom) Joan Ridley	7	2	7
(India) Eric Andreae (India) Yolande Gough	5	6	5

Second round
(United Kingdom) J Hillyard (United Kingdom) M Hazel	2	4
(United Kingdom) R Poland (United Kingdom) CJ Tyrrell	6	6
(France) J Borotra (France) S Lenglen	6	6
(Netherlands) H Timmer (Netherlands) K Bouman	3	0
(United Kingdom) B Gilbert (United Kingdom) K McKane	6	6
(New Zealand) JA Fotheringham (United Kingdom) D Busby	0	4
(United Kingdom) R Dash (United Kingdom) P Watson	6	6
(South Africa) J Lezard (United Kingdom) J Ridley	4	4

Third round
(United Kingdom) R Poland (United Kingdom) CJ Tyrrell	1	1
(France) J Borotra (France) S Lenglen	6	6
(United Kingdom) B Gilbert (United Kingdom) K McKane	6	6
(United Kingdom) R Dash (United Kingdom) P Watson	2	0

Quarterfinals
(France) J Borotra (France) S Lenglen	6	6
(United Kingdom) B Gilbert (United Kingdom) K McKane	1	2
