= 1929 Wimbledon Championships – Mixed doubles =

Mixed doubles
- 1929 Wimbledon Championships

Final
- Champions: (United States) Frank Hunter (United States) Helen Wills
- Runners-up: (United Kingdom) Ian Collins (United Kingdom) Joan Fry
- Score: 6–1, 6–4

Details
- Draw: 64 (5Q)
- Seeds: 4

Events
Singles	men	women		boys	girls
Doubles	men	women	mixed	boys	girls
- Wimbledon Championships

Pat Spence and Elizabeth Ryan were the defending champions, but Spence did not participate. Ryan partnered with Colin Gregory, but lost in the semifinals to Ian Collins and Joan Fry.

Frank Hunter and Helen Wills defeated Collins and Fry in the final, 6–1, 6–4 to win the mixed doubles tennis title at the 1929 Wimbledon Championships.

== Seeds ==
1. (France) Henri Cochet / (United Kingdom) Eileen Bennett (quarterfinals)
2. (United States) Frank Hunter / (United States) Helen Wills (champions)
3. (United Kingdom) Colin Gregory / (United States) Elizabeth Ryan (semifinals)
4. (France) Jean Borotra / (Netherlands) Kea Bouman (quarterfinals)

Click on the seed number of a player to go to their draw section.

== Draw ==
Key

- Q = Qualifier
- WC = Wild card
- LL = Lucky loser
- Alt = Alternate
- ITF = ITF entry
- PR = Protected ranking
- SR = Special ranking
- SE = Special exempt
- JE = Junior exempt
- JR = Junior Accelerator Programme entrant
- CO = College Accelerator Programme entrant
- NG = Next Gen Accelerator Program entrant
- w/o = Walkover
- r = Retired
- d = Defaulted

=== Finals ===
Quarterfinals
1	(France) Henri Cochet (United Kingdom) Eileen Bennett	6	4	6
(United Kingdom) Ian Collins (United Kingdom) Joan Fry	2	6	8
3	(United Kingdom) Colin Gregory (United States) Elizabeth Ryan	6	9
(United States) Wilmer Allison (United States) Helen Jacobs	0	7
2	(United States) Frank Hunter (United States) Helen Wills	6	6
(United Kingdom) Donald Greig (United Kingdom) Mary McIlquham	1	1
4	(France) Jean Borotra (Netherlands) Kea Bouman	8	6	5
(South Africa) Norman Farquharson (South Africa) Bobbie Heine	10	2	7

Semifinals
(United Kingdom) Ian Collins (United Kingdom) Joan Fry	6	6
3	(United Kingdom) Colin Gregory (United States) Elizabeth Ryan	2	3
2	(United States) Frank Hunter (United States) Helen Wills	6	6	6
(South Africa) Norman Farquharson (South Africa) Bobbie Heine	8	2	3

Final
(United Kingdom) Ian Collins (United Kingdom) Joan Fry	1	4
2	(United States) Frank Hunter (United States) Helen Wills	6	6

=== Top half ===
==== Section 1 ====
First round
1	(France) Henri Cochet (United Kingdom) Eileen Bennett	6	7
(Germany) Daniel Prenn (Germany) Cilly Aussem	1	5
(United States) Bill Tilden (United States) Molla Mallory	6	6
(Hungary) Béla von Kehrling (India) Jenny Sandison	2	2
(United Kingdom) Cyril Eames (United Kingdom) Evelyn Colyer	6	6	6
(South Africa) Colin Robbins (South Africa) Billie Tapscott	8	1	3
(Austria) Franz Matejka (United Kingdom) Peggy Dransfield	6	1	2
(France) René de Buzelet (France) Simone Barbier	3	6	6
Q	(South Africa) Gerald Sherwell (United Kingdom) Elsa Haylock	6	6
(Japan) Yoshiro Ohta (United Kingdom) Mrs BE Crouch	4	0
(United Kingdom) Patrick Wheatley (United Kingdom) Ermyntrude Harvey	5	6	6
(United Kingdom) Guy Cooper (United Kingdom) Gwen Sterry	7	3	1
(Romania) Nicolae Mișu (Italy) Lucia Valerio	w/o
(United Kingdom) Ian Collins (United Kingdom) Joan Fry
(United Kingdom) Keats Lester (United Kingdom) Dorothy Shepherd-Barron	4	4
Q	(United Kingdom) Norman Latchford (United Kingdom) Enid Broadbridge	6	6

Second round
1	(France) H Cochet (United Kingdom) E Bennett	7	6
(United States) W Tilden (United States) M Mallory	5	3
(United Kingdom) C Eames (United Kingdom) E Colyer	6	6
(France) R de Buzelet (France) S Barbier	3	3
Q	(South Africa) G Sherwell (United Kingdom) E Haylock	1	6	2
(United Kingdom) P Wheatley (United Kingdom) E Harvey	6	4	6
(United Kingdom) I Collins (United Kingdom) J Fry	6	2	6
Q	(United Kingdom) N Latchford (United Kingdom) E Broadbridge	2	6	0

Third round
1	(France) H Cochet (United Kingdom) E Bennett	6	8
(United Kingdom) C Eames (United Kingdom) E Colyer	4	6
(United Kingdom) P Wheatley (United Kingdom) E Harvey	4	6	3
(United Kingdom) I Collins (United Kingdom) J Fry	6	4	6

Quarterfinals
1	(France) H Cochet (United Kingdom) E Bennett	6	4	6
(United Kingdom) I Collins (United Kingdom) J Fry	2	6	8

==== Section 2 ====
First round
3	(United Kingdom) Colin Gregory (United States) Elizabeth Ryan	6	6
(Japan) Ryuki Miki (United Kingdom) Phyllis Mudford	4	3
(United Kingdom) Jack Hillyard (United Kingdom) Phyllis Satterthwaite	6	7
(Germany) Karl Wetzel (Germany) Ilse Friedleben	4	5
(South Africa) Louis Raymond (South Africa) Audrey de Smidt	6	6
(United Kingdom) John Olliff (United Kingdom) Naomi Trentham	1	0
(Italy) Uberto de Morpurgo (Italy) Julie Serpieri	7	6
(United Kingdom) William Powell (United Kingdom) Violet Chamberlain	5	4
(United Kingdom) Herman David (United Kingdom) Dorothy Round	2	6	6
(United Kingdom) Eric Peters (United Kingdom) Dorothy Jameson	6	3	2
(Republic of Ireland) Cecil Campbell (Republic of Ireland) Lavender Campbell
(Egypt) Jacques Grandguillot (France) Nanette le Besnerais	w/o
(Belgium) AndréLacroix (Belgium) Yvonne Sigart	3	1
(Denmark) Einer Ulrich (Denmark) Else Dam	6	6
(France) Antoine Gentien (France) Violette Gallay	0	2
(United States) Wilmer Allison (United States) Helen Jacobs	6	6

Second round
3	(United Kingdom) C Gregory (United States) E Ryan	6	6
(United Kingdom) J Hillyard (United Kingdom) P Satterthwaite	1	4
(South Africa) L Raymond (South Africa) A de Smidt	3	6	4
(Italy) H de Morpurgo (Italy) J Serpieri	6	4	6
(United Kingdom) H David (United Kingdom) D Round	6	3	7
(Republic of Ireland) C Campbell (Republic of Ireland) L Campbell	2	6	5
(Denmark) E Ulrich (Denmark) E Dam	6	2	2
(United States) W Allison (United States) H Jacobs	2	6	6

Third round
3	(United Kingdom) C Gregory (United States) E Ryan	6	6
(Italy) H de Morpurgo (Italy) J Serpieri	4	1
(United Kingdom) H David (United Kingdom) D Round	7	4
(United States) W Allison (United States) H Jacobs	9	6

Quarterfinals
3	(United Kingdom) C Gregory (United States) E Ryan	6	9
(United States) W Allison (United States) H Jacobs	0	7

=== Bottom half ===
==== Section 3 ====
First round
2	(United States) Frank Hunter (United States) Helen Wills	6	6
Q	(United Kingdom) Alan Brown (United Kingdom) CJ Tyrrell	1	0
(United Kingdom) Alfred Ingram (United Kingdom) Peggy Pleydell-Bouverie	6	1
(United Kingdom) Pat Hughes (United Kingdom) Dorothy Hill	8	6
(United Kingdom) Gordon Crole-Rees (United Kingdom) Phoebe Watson	6	6
Q	(United Kingdom) Eric Hollins (United Kingdom) Barbara Drew	1	1
(Germany) Friedrich Frenz (Netherlands) Mence Canters	w/o
(Germany) Hans Moldenhauer (Germany) Irmgard Rost
(South Africa) Roy Malcolm (South Africa) Doreen Cole	7	6
(Austria) Ludwig von Salm-Hoogstraeten (United Kingdom) Betty Dix	5	2
(New Zealand) Buster Andrews (United Kingdom) Phyllis Covell	6	6	3
(United States) John Hennessey (United States) Marjorie Morrill	2	8	6
(United Kingdom) Randolph Lycett (United Kingdom) Joan Lycett	7	5
(France) Jacques Brugnon (France) Simonne Mathieu	9	7
(United Kingdom) Donald Greig (United Kingdom) Mary McIlquham	6	6
(Netherlands) Hendrik Timmer (Netherlands) Madzy Couquerque	4	3

Second round
2	(United States) F Hunter (United States) H Wills	6	6
(United Kingdom) P Hughes (United Kingdom) D Hill	3	2
(United Kingdom) G Crole-Rees (United Kingdom) P Watson	6	6
(Germany) H Moldenhauer (Germany) I Rost	2	0
(South Africa) R Malcolm (South Africa) D Cole	6	5	6
(United States) J Hennessey (United States) M Morrill	0	7	1
(France) J Brugnon (France) S Mathieu	3	2
(United Kingdom) D Greig (United Kingdom) M McIlquham	6	6

Third round
2	(United States) F Hunter (United States) H Wills	6	6
(United Kingdom) G Crole-Rees (United Kingdom) P Watson	1	4
(South Africa) R Malcolm (South Africa) D Cole	7	3	1
(United Kingdom) D Greig (United Kingdom) M McIlquham	5	6	6

Quarterfinals
2	(United States) F Hunter (United States) H Wills	6	6
(United Kingdom) D Greig (United Kingdom) M McIlquham	1	1

==== Section 4 ====
First round
4	(France) Jean Borotra (Netherlands) Kea Bouman	6	6
(Belgium) Léopold de Borman (United Kingdom) Helen Bourne	1	1
Q	(United Kingdom) JDF Fisher (United Kingdom) Betty Uber	4	8	4
(United States) George Lott (United States) Edith Cross	6	6	6
(United Kingdom) Stan Harris (United Kingdom) Joan Ridley
(United Kingdom) Brian Gilbert (United Kingdom) Margaret Stocks	w/o
(France) Pierre Henri Landry (France) Jacqueline Gallay	6	6
(France) Emmanuel du Plaix (United Kingdom) H Evelyn-Jones	4	3
(Germany) Heinrich Kleinschroth (Germany) Toni Schomburgk	12	8
(Greece) Augustos Zerlendis (Greece) I Lenos	10	6
(United Kingdom) Lewis Michell (United Kingdom) Peggy Michell	7	6
(United Kingdom) Nigel Sharpe (South Africa) Alida Neave	5	4
(Italy) Alberto del Bono (United Kingdom) MA Thomas	3	3
(South Africa) Norman Farquharson (South Africa) Bobbie Heine	6	6
(United Kingdom) Bunny Austin (United Kingdom) Betty Nuthall	4	10	6
(France) Christian Boussus (Belgium) Josane Sigart	6	8	1

Second round
4	(France) J Borotra (Netherlands) K Bouman	6	6
(United States) G Lott (United States) E Cross	3	2
(United Kingdom) S Harris (United Kingdom) J Ridley	4	1
(France) PH Landry (France) J Gallay	6	6
(Germany) H Kleinschroth (Germany) T Schomburgk	2	3
(United Kingdom) L Michell (United Kingdom) M Michell	6	6
(South Africa) N Farquharson (South Africa) E Heine	6	6
(United Kingdom) H Austin (United Kingdom) B Nuthall	3	1

Third round
4	(France) J Borotra (Netherlands) K Bouman	6	6
(France) PH Landry (France) J Gallay	2	4
(United Kingdom) L Michell (United Kingdom) M Michell	2	6
(South Africa) N Farquharson (South Africa) E Heine	6	8

Quarterfinals
4	(France) J Borotra (Netherlands) K Bouman	8	6	5
(South Africa) N Farquharson (South Africa) E Heine	10	2	7
