= Surrey Championships =

Defunct tennis tournament
- Event name: Surrey Championships (1890–67); Surrey Grass Court Championships (1968–80)
- Tour: Grand Prix circuit (1968–1975, 1979–1980)
- Founded: 1890
- Abolished: 1981
- Editions: 72
- Location: Surbiton, Surrey, England
- Venue: Berrylands LTC (1890-1974); Surbiton Lawn Tennis and Squash Rackets Club (1975-81)
- Surface: Grass

The Surrey Championships also known as the Surrey Grass Court Championships and the Surrey County Championships was a men's and women's international tennis event originally founded in 1882 as the Berrylands Club Tournament. In 1890 the former tournament's name was changed to the Surbiton Open that featured the first Surrey County Championships. The tournament was first played in Richmond then later in Surbiton, Surrey, England on outdoor grass courts. It ran for 73 editions from 1890 to 1981 and after a period of 18 years re-emerged as the Surbiton Trophy.

== History ==
In 1881 the Berryland Lawn Tennis Club was founded. In 1882 the club staged the first precursor event to these championships known as the Berrylands Club Tournament. In 1889 the Berrylands Lawn Tennis Tournament name was changed to the Surbiton Open. In 1890 the Surbiton Open was held that also featured the first Surrey County Championships. It was an amateur tournament until the open era of tennis considered an important warm-up event to the Wimbledon Championships and the "first big opener of the grass court season" it attracted many former British and foreign Grand Slam champions post open era the tournament was part of the men's Grand Prix Tour in 1974 and from 1979 to 1980. In 1975 the Berryland Lawn Tennis Club's name was changed to the Surbiton Lawn Tennis and Squash Rackets Club. During the 1975 Championships the tournament witnessed the longest single game in tennis history, during a match between Keith Glass and Anthony Fawcett – the game was not timed but it contained 37 deuces. (Note: According to Bud Collins the game lasted 31 minutes.) The men's championships moved to a northern venue in 1981. In 1997 the tournament was first revived as an exhibition tournament won by Jason Stoltenberg. Then in 1998 the former Surrey Championships was restored with a new name known as the Surbiton Trophy.

== Finals ==
Notes: Challenge round: The final round of a tournament, in which the winner of a single-elimination phase faces the previous year's champion, who plays only that one match. The challenge round was used in the early history of tennis (from 1877 through 1921) in some tournaments, but not all. (c) Indicates challenger

=== Men's singles ===
Year	Champions	Runners-up	Score
Surrey County Championships
1890	(United Kingdom) Harry S. Barlow	(United Kingdom) Wilfred Baddeley	5–7, 6–3, 7–5, 6-2
1891	Not held		
1892	(United Kingdom) Harry S. Barlow (2)	(United Kingdom) Horace Chapman	6–2, 6-2 6–1
1893/1899	Not held		
1900	(United Kingdom of Great Britain and Ireland) Charles Dixon	(United Kingdom) Major Ritchie	6–3, 1–6, 6–3, 6-2
1901	(United Kingdom of Great Britain and Ireland) Philip Graeme Pearson	(United Kingdom) David M. A. G. Hawes	6–2, 2–6, 6–2
1902	(United Kingdom of Great Britain and Ireland) Major Ritchie (2)	(United Kingdom of Great Britain and Ireland) Charles Martin	6–1, 6–1
1903	(United Kingdom of Great Britain and Ireland) Major Ritchie (3)	(United Kingdom of Great Britain and Ireland) Brame Hillyard	6–1, 6–1, 1–6, 6-4
Surrey Grass Court Championships
1904	(United Kingdom of Great Britain and Ireland) Sydney H. Smith	(United Kingdom of Great Britain and Ireland) Major Ritchie	6–3, 6–3, 6–3
1905	(United Kingdom of Great Britain and Ireland) Sydney H. Smith (2)	(United Kingdom of Great Britain and Ireland) Roy Allen	6–2, 6–3, 6–1
1906	(United Kingdom of Great Britain and Ireland) Sydney H. Smith (3)	(New Zealand) Anthony Wilding	walkover
1907	(United Kingdom of Great Britain and Ireland) Arthur Gore	(United Kingdom of Great Britain and Ireland) Major Ritchie	6–3, 6–2, 6–3
1908	(United Kingdom of Great Britain and Ireland) Major Ritchie (4)	(United Kingdom of Great Britain and Ireland) Arthur Gore	6–3, 6–4, 6–2
1909	(United Kingdom of Great Britain and Ireland) Major Ritchie (5)	(United Kingdom of Great Britain and Ireland) Charles Dixon	4–6, 6–2, 6–4, 0–6, 6–4
1910	(United Kingdom of Great Britain and Ireland) Major Ritchie (6)	(Canada) Robert Powell	6–3, 6–1, 2–6, 6–3
1911	(United Kingdom of Great Britain and Ireland) Charles Dixon (2)	(New Zealand) Anthony Wilding	7–5, 3–6, 6–0, 6–1
1912	(United Kingdom of Great Britain and Ireland) Charles Dixon (3)	(United Kingdom of Great Britain and Ireland) Major Ritchie	6–2, 6–2, 6–3
1913	(United Kingdom of Great Britain and Ireland) Charles Dixon (4)	(United Kingdom of Great Britain and Ireland) Theodore Mavrogordato	6–2, 8–6, 6–3
1914	(Australia) Norman Brookes	(United Kingdom of Great Britain and Ireland) Francis Gordon Lowe	6–1, 6–1, 5–7, 6–8, 6–3
1915/1918	Not held (due to World War I)		
1919	(Australia) Gerald Patterson	(United Kingdom of Great Britain and Ireland) Herbert Roper Barrett	6–2, 6–3, 6–2
1920	(New Zealand) Francis Fisher	(United Kingdom of Great Britain and Ireland) Theodore Mavrogordato	6–4, 6–4, 6–1
1921	(South Africa) Brian Norton	(United Kingdom of Great Britain and Ireland) Sydney M. Jacob	6–2 6–2 6–3
1922	(South Africa) Brian Norton (2)	(United Kingdom of Great Britain and Ireland) Randolph Lycett	9–7, 7–5, 1–6, 6–1
1923	(United Kingdom of Great Britain and Ireland) Randolph Lycett	(South Africa) Brian Norton	3–6 6–4 6–1 2–6 7–5
1924	(United Kingdom) Jack Hillyard	(United Kingdom) Henry Mayes	6–4, 1–6, 10–12, 6–3, 6–2
1925	(United Kingdom) Gordon Crole Rees	(British Raj) Athar-Ali Fyzee	3–6, 7–5, 3–6, 6–2, 6–4
1926	(United Kingdom) Charles Kingsley	(United Kingdom) Gordon Crole Rees	6–4, 6–2 ret.
1927	(United Kingdom) Gordon Crole Rees (2)	(United Kingdom) Nigel Sharpe	6–1, 6–0
1928	(Canada) Henry Mayes	(South Africa) Patrick Spence	6–2, 6–4
1929	(United Kingdom) Eric Peters	(United Kingdom) Oswald Turnbull	3–6, 6–1, 6–1, 6–3
1930	(Japan) Yoshiro Ohta	(United Kingdom) Fred Perry	6–1, 4–6, 6–3
1931	(Japan) Iwao Aoki	(United Kingdom) Harry Lee	title shared
1932	(United Kingdom) Nigel Sharpe	(Japan) Iwao Aoki	7–5, 6–3
1933	(United Kingdom) David Herman	(United Kingdom) David H. Williams	title shared
1934	(Japan) Jiro Yamagishi	(Japan) Hideo Nishimura	6–3, 6–3
1935	(New Zealand) Buster Andrews	(South Africa) Patrick Spence	6–2, 6–3
1936	(New Zealand) Cam Malfroy	(United Kingdom) Harry Lee	6–2, 9–11, 6–0
1937	(United Kingdom) Robert Tinkler	(United Kingdom) Pat Sherwood	9–7, 6–3
1938	(United Kingdom) John Olliff	(United Kingdom) Eric Filby	2–6, 6–4, 6–3
1939	(Taiwan) Kho Sin-Kie	(United Kingdom) Jack Deloford	6–2, 6–4
1940/1945	Not held (due to World War II		
1946	(Netherlands) Hans van Swol	(United Kingdom) David Butler	4–6, 6–4, 7–5
1947	(United Kingdom) Claude Lister	(Egypt) Marcel Coen	7–5, 6–2
1948	(Australia) John Bromwich	(United Kingdom) Geoffrey Paish	title shared
1949	(Poland) Czesław Spychała	(United Kingdom) Geoffrey Paish	6–3, 6–0
1950	(India) Narendra Nath	(Poland) Czesław Spychała	6–2, 6–4
1951	(Poland) Czesław Spychała (2)	(South Africa) David Samaai	1–6, 7–5, 6–3
1952	(Australia) Ian Ayre	(South Africa) Bryan Woodroffe	6–4, 6–2
1953	(Australia) George Worthington	(United Kingdom) Roger Becker	6–3, 6–1
1954	(New Zealand) John Barry	(South Africa) Abe Segal	title shared
1955	(Australia) Malcolm Anderson	(India) Ramanathan Krishnan	6–3, 6–4
1956	(South Africa) Ian Vermaak	(South Africa) Gordon Forbes	6–4, 6–3
1957	(United Kingdom) Roger Becker	(United Kingdom) Alan Mills	7–9, 6–2, 6–3
1958	(United Kingdom) Roger Becker (2)	(United Kingdom) Mike Davies	4–6, 6–2, 6–2
1959	(United Kingdom) Mike Davies	(Australia) Warren Jacques	7–9, 6–2, 6–4, 6–3
1960	(United Kingdom) Roger Becker (3)	(South Africa) Keith Diepraam	6–4, 6–1
1961	(Australia) Martin Mulligan	(Australia) Warren Jacques	9–7, 6–2
1962	(Australia) Martin Mulligan (2)	(New Zealand) Mark Otway	6–3, 6–4
1963	(United Kingdom) Roger Taylor	(India) Jaidip Mukerjea	10–8, 9–11, 10–8
1964	(South Africa) David Phillips	(Australia) Bob Carmichael	2–6, 6–4, 8–6
1965	(Sweden) Jan-Erik Lundqvist	(United Kingdom) Roger Taylor	9–7, 6–3
1966	(United Kingdom) Keith Wooldridge	(United Kingdom) Peter Curtis	7–5, 6–4
1967	(United Kingdom) Roger Taylor (2)	(United Kingdom) Bobby Wilson	2–6, 6–4, 6–2
↓ Open era ↓
1968	(United Kingdom) Keith Wooldridge	(Australia) Ken Fletcher	3–6, 6–3, 7–5
1969	(United Kingdom) Gerald Battrick	(Australia) John Cooper	6–2, 6–1
1970	(South Africa) Robert Maud	(South Africa) Frew McMillan	6–4, 6–3
1971	(India) Anand Amritraj	(United Kingdom) Paul Hutchins	6–2, 6–2
1972	(India) Premjit Lall	(Australia) Ross Case	6–4, 8–6
1973	(Australia) Owen Davidson	(Australia) Tony Roche	4–6, 6–4, 10–8
1974	(Australia) Bob Giltinan	(Australia) Syd Ball	6–3, 6–2
1975	(Australia) Peter McNamara	(United States) Steve Docherty	4–6, 9–8, 6–4
1976	Not held		
1977	(United Kingdom) P. Lawlor	(United Kingdom) Chris Wells	4–6, 6–3, 8-6
1978	(United Kingdom) David Lloyd	(United Kingdom) Willie Davies	6–4, 6–7, 6-5
1979	(United States) Victor Amaya	(Australia) Mark Edmondson	6–4, 7–5
1980	(United States) Brian Gottfried	(United States) Sandy Mayer	6–3, 6–3

=== Women's singles ===
- Note: The 1898 to 1900 events (*) were "closed" tournaments that were restricted to county team members only.

Year	Champions	Runners-up	Score
Surrey County Championships
1890	(United Kingdom) May Arbuthnot	(United Kingdom) Elizabeth Mocatta	6–2, 6–2
1891	Not held		
1892	(United Kingdom) May Arbuthnot (2)	(United Kingdom) Ivy Arbuthnot	6–3, 6–3
1893/1897	Not held		
1898	(United Kingdom) Ellen Thynne	(United Kingdom) Amy Wilson Kirby	6–2, 7–5 *
1899	(United Kingdom) Ellen Thynne (2)	(United Kingdom) Edith J. Bromfield	6–2, 2–6, 6–2 *
1900	(United Kingdom) Charlotte Cooper	(United Kingdom) Ellen Thynne Evered	6–2, 6–2 *
1900	(United Kingdom) Edith Bromfield	(United Kingdom) Ellen Thynne Evered	5–7, 6–3, 7–5
1901	(United Kingdom) Charlotte Cooper Sterry (2)	(United Kingdom) Edith Bromfield	6–1, 6–3
1902	(United Kingdom) Charlotte Cooper Sterry (3)	(United Kingdom) Agnes Morton	6–3, 6–3
1903	(United Kingdom) Toupie Lowther	(United Kingdom) Edith Bromfield	3–6, 6–1, 6–3
Surrey Grass Court Championships
1904	(United Kingdom) Connie Wilson	(United Kingdom) Ellen Stawell-Brown	6–4, 7–5
1905	(United Kingdom) Connie Wilson (2)	(United Kingdom) Agnes Morton	6–2, 6–0
1906	(United Kingdom) Toupie Lowther (2)	(United Kingdom) Dora Boothby	5–7, 6–4, 8–6
1907	(United Kingdom) Charlotte Cooper Sterry (4)	(United Kingdom) Dorothea Douglass Chambers	6–4, 6–3
1908	(United Kingdom) Alice Greene	(United Kingdom) Charlotte Cooper Sterry	3–6, 6–2, 6–2
1909	(United Kingdom) Dora Boothby	(United Kingdom) Edith Johnson	6–0, 6–4
1910	(United Kingdom) Dora Boothby (2)	(United Kingdom) Agnes Morton	6–3, 6–3
1911	(United Kingdom) Helen Aitchison	(United Kingdom) Agnes Morton	6–3, 6–4
1912	(United Kingdom) Ethel Thomson Larcombe	(United Kingdom) Dora Boothby	7–5, 6–3
1913	(United Kingdom) Charlotte Cooper Sterry (5)	(United Kingdom) Madeline Fisher O'Neill	8–6, 6–1
1914	(United Kingdom) Dorothea Douglass Chambers	(United Kingdom) Ethel Thomson Larcombe	6–3, 2–6, 6–4
1915/1918	Not held (due to World War I)		
1919	(United States) Elizabeth Ryan	(United Kingdom) Dorothea Douglass Chambers	walkover
1920	(United Kingdom) Dorothea Douglass Chambers (2)	(United States) Elizabeth Ryan	6–4, 6–2
1921	(United States) Elizabeth Ryan (2)	(United Kingdom) Dorothy Holman	6–0, 6–0
1922	(United States) Elizabeth Ryan (3)	(South Africa) Irene Bowder Peacock	10–8, 6–2
1923	(United States) Elizabeth Ryan (4)	(United Kingdom) Eleanor Rose	3–6, 6–3, 6–2
1924	(United States) Elizabeth Ryan (5)	(United Kingdom) Aurea Farrington Edgington	6–3, 6–4
1925	(United States) Elizabeth Ryan (6)	(United Kingdom) Kathleen McKane	7–9, 6–1, 6–3
1926	(United Kingdom) Joan Fry	(United Kingdom) Phoebe Holcroft Watson	3–6, 6–1, 6–2
1927	(South Africa) Bobbie Heine	(South Africa) Irene Bowder Peacock	1–6, 6–3, 7–5
1928	(United Kingdom) Elsie Goldsack	(United Kingdom) Joan Ridley	6–4, 6–2
1929	(United Kingdom) Betty Nuthall	(United States) Elizabeth Ryan	7–5, 6–1
1930	(India) Jenny Sandison	(United Kingdom) Betty Nuthall	3–6, 7–5, 6–4
1931	(United Kingdom) Dorothy Shaw Jameson	(United Kingdom) Joan Austin	title shared
1932	(United Kingdom) Gwen Sterry	(United Kingdom) Peggy Michell	7–5, 6–4
1933	(United Kingdom) Peggy Michell	(United Kingdom) Elsie Goldsack Pittman	title shared
1934	(United Kingdom) Elsie Goldsack Pittman (2)	(United Kingdom) Patricia Brazier	6–3 6–3
1935	(Australia) Joan Hartigan	(United Kingdom) Phyllis Mudford King	6–4, 6–3
1936	(United Kingdom) Dorothy Round	(Chile) Anita Lizana	6–2, 6–3
1937	(United Kingdom) Freda James	(United States) Alice Marble	6–4, 6–3
1938	(United States) Helen Wills	(United Kingdom) Margot Lumb	6–3 6–4
1939	(United Kingdom) Mary Hardwick	(United Kingdom) Margot Lumb	6–4, 6–4
1940/1945	Not held (due to World War II)		
1946	(United Kingdom) Kay Stammers Menzies	(United Kingdom) Gay Moorhouse Chandler	6–4, 6–3
1947	(United Kingdom) Kay Stammers Menzies (2)	(United Kingdom) Joan Curry	2–6, 6–4, 6–4
1948	(United Kingdom) Joan Curry	(United Kingdom) Jean Walker-Smith	title shared
1949	(United States) Patricia Canning Todd	(United Kingdom) Jean Walker-Smith	6–3, 9–7
1950	(United Kingdom) Jean Walker-Smith	(United Kingdom) Jean Quertier	6–2, 7–5
1951	(United Kingdom) Helen Fletcher	(United Kingdom) Joan Curry	6–3, 6–1
1952	(United States) Maureen Connolly	(United States) Patricia Canning Todd	3–6, 6–3, 6–4
1953	(United Kingdom) Patricia Ward	(United Kingdom) Shirley Bloomer	6–2, 6–3
1954	(United States) Shirley Fry	(United States) Doris Hart	title shared
1955	(United Kingdom) Rosemary Walsh	(Australia) Daphne Seeney	6–4, 7–5
1956	(United States) Althea Gibson	(United Kingdom) Anne Shilcock	6–3, 13-11
1957	(United States) Althea Gibson (2)	(Australia) Thelma Coyne Long	8–6, 7–5
1958	(United States) Althea Gibson (3)	(United States) Mimi Arnold	6–1, 6–0
1959	(United States) Sally Moore	(United Kingdom) Ann Haydon	6–4, 6–2
1960	(United Kingdom) Angela Mortimer	(United Kingdom) Christine Truman	3–6, 6–4, 9–7
1961	(United Kingdom) Deidre Catt	(West Germany) Edda Buding	5–7, 6–3, 7–5
1962	(United Kingdom) Angela Mortimer (2)	(United States) Carole Caldwell	6–4, 6–4
1963	(United Kingdom) Deidre Catt (2)	(United States) Darlene Hard	1–6, 9–7, 8–6
1964	(United Kingdom) Ann Haydon Jones	(United States) Carole Caldwell	6–3, 6–1
1965	(United Kingdom) Christine Truman	(United Kingdom) Rita Bentley	7–5, 6–1
1966	(United Kingdom) Winnie Shaw	(United States) Mary-Ann Eisel	6–4, 4–6, 6–3
1967	(United States) Lynn Abbes	(United Kingdom) Robin Blakelock-Lloyd	6–4, 6–3
↓ Open era ↓
1968	(Australia) Judy Tegart-Dalton	(United Kingdom) Christine Truman	10–8, 6–4
1969	(United States) Mary-Ann Eisel	(Australia) Judy Tegart-Dalton	4–6, 6–4, 8–6
1970	(United Kingdom) Ann Haydon Jones (2)	(United States) Patti Hogan	2–6, 6–3, 6–4
1971	(Australia) Judy Tegart-Dalton	(United Kingdom) Joyce Barclay	9–8, 6–2
1972	(United Kingdom) Joyce Barclay	(United States) Patti Hogan	6–4, 6–3
1973	(Australia) Wendy Turnbull	(United States) Ann Kiyomura	6–2, 6–0
1974	(United Kingdom) Sue Barker	(United Kingdom) Sue Mappin	6–2, 7–5
1975	(South Africa) Greer Stevens	(United States) Patti Hogan	6–1, 6–4
1976	Not held		
1977	(United Kingdom) Winnie Wooldridge (2)	(South Africa) Gwynn Sammel	6–3, 7–6
1978	(Australia) Evonne Goolagong Cawley	(United Kingdom) Winnie Shaw	6–1, 6–1
1979	(Australia) Cynthia Doerner-Sieler	(Australia) Kym Ruddell	6–1, 6–2
1980	Not held		
1981	(United States) Betsy Nagelsen	(United States) Barbara Hallquist	6–0, 6–4

=== Men's doubles ===
Year	Champions	Runners-up	Score
1927 – 1978	Unavailable		
1979	(United States) Tim Gullikson (United States) Tom Gullikson	(United States) Pat DuPré (United States) Marty Riessen	6–3, 6–7, 8–6
1980	(Australia) Mark Edmondson (Australia) Kim Warwick	(Zimbabwe) Andrew Pattison (United States) Butch Walts	7–6, 6–7, 6–7, 7–6, 15–13
