= 1925 Wimbledon Championships – Women's singles =

Tennis tournament

Women's singles
- 1925 Wimbledon Championships

Final
- Champion: (France) Suzanne Lenglen
- Runner-up: (United Kingdom) Joan Fry
- Score: 6–2, 6–0

Details
- Draw: 64 (8Q)
- Seeds: –

Events
| Singles | men | women | | boys | girls |
| Doubles | men | women | mixed | boys | girls |
- Wimbledon Championships

Suzanne Lenglen defeated Joan Fry 6–2, 6–0 in the final to win the ladies' singles tennis title at the 1925 Wimbledon Championships.

Kitty McKane was the defending champion, but lost in the semifinals to Lenglen.

== Draw ==
Key

- Q = Qualifier
- WC = Wild card
- LL = Lucky loser
- Alt = Alternate
- ITF = ITF entry
- PR = Protected ranking
- SR = Special ranking
- SE = Special exempt
- JE = Junior exempt
- JR = Junior Accelerator Programme entrant
- CO = College Accelerator Programme entrant
- NG = Next Gen Accelerator Program entrant
- w/o = Walkover
- r = Retired
- d = Defaulted

=== Finals ===
Quarterfinals
(United Kingdom) Kitty McKane | 6 | 6
(Australia) Esna Boyd | 1 | 1
(France) Suzanne Lenglen | 6 | 6
(United Kingdom) Winifred Beamish | 0 | 0
(United Kingdom) Joan Fry | 2 | 6 | 6
(Australia) Daphne Akhurst | 6 | 4 | 3
(France) Marguerite Billout | 6 | 6
(United Kingdom) Mary McIlquham | 3 | 3

Semifinals
(United Kingdom) Kitty McKane | 0 | 0
(France) Suzanne Lenglen | 6 | 6
(United Kingdom) Joan Fry | 6 | 4 | 6
(France) Marguerite Billout | 2 | 6 | 3

Final
(France) Suzanne Lenglen | 6 | 6
(United Kingdom) Joan Fry | 2 | 0

=== Top half ===
==== Section 1 ====
First round
(United Kingdom) Phyllis Satterthwaite | 6 | 6
(United Kingdom) Gladys Seel | 1 | 2
(Netherlands) Mence Canters | 6 | 1 | 0
Q | (United Kingdom) Beatrice Brown | 3 | 6 | 6
(New Zealand) Mrs WJ Melody | 3 | 0
(United Kingdom) Kathleen Lidderdale | 6 | 6
(United Kingdom) Kitty McKane | 6 | 6
(United Kingdom) Gwen Sterry | 3 | 1
(South Africa) Millicent Pitt
(United Kingdom) L Dixon | w/o
(United Kingdom) Christabel Hardie | 2 | 0
(Australia) Esna Boyd | 6 | 6
(United Kingdom) Agnes Tuckey | 6 | 7
(United Kingdom) Peggy Dransfield | 3 | 5
(United Kingdom) Mabel Mavrogordato | 7 | 2 | 6
Q | (United Kingdom) Claire Beckingham | 5 | 6 | 2

Second round
(United Kingdom) P Satterthwaite | 6 | 6
Q | (United Kingdom) B Brown | 2 | 1
(United Kingdom) K Bridge | 0 | 1
(United Kingdom) K McKane | 6 | 6
(South Africa) M Pitt | 2 | 2
(Australia) E Boyd | 6 | 6
(United Kingdom) A Tuckey | 6 | 0
(United Kingdom) M Mavrogordato | 2 | 0^{r}

Third round
(United Kingdom) P Satterthwaite | 3 | 1
(United Kingdom) K McKane | 6 | 6
(Australia) E Boyd | 3 | 6 | 6
(United Kingdom) A Tuckey | 6 | 1 | 3

Quarterfinals
(United Kingdom) K McKane | 6 | 6
(Australia) E Boyd | 1 | 1

==== Section 2 ====
First round
(United States) Elizabeth Ryan | 6 | 6
(United Kingdom) Joyce Brown | 3 | 4
(France) Suzanne Lenglen
(United Kingdom) Aurea Edgington | w/o
(United Kingdom) Blanche Colston | w/o
Q | (United Kingdom) Elsie Goldsack
(United Kingdom) Naomi Jackson-Feilden | 6 | 1 | 0
(United Kingdom) Louise Bull | 2 | 6 | 6
(India) Yolande Gough | 6 | 7
(United States) Anne Townsend | 3 | 5
(United Kingdom) Mrs MB Reckitt | 6 | 6
(United Kingdom) Enid Head | 2 | 2
(Australia) Lorna Utz | w/o
Q | (United Kingdom) Mary Cambridge
(United Kingdom) Winifred Beamish | 6 | 6
Q | (United Kingdom) Irene Maltby | 0 | 2

Second round
(United States) E Ryan | 2 | 0
(France) S Lenglen | 6 | 6
Q | (United Kingdom) E Goldsack | 6 | 6
(United Kingdom) L Bull | 2 | 3
(India) Y Gough | 2 | 0
(United Kingdom) E Head | 6 | 6
Q | (United Kingdom) M Cambridge | 0 | 0
(United Kingdom) W Beamish | 6 | 6

Third round
(France) S Lenglen | 6 | 6
Q | (United Kingdom) E Goldsack | 1 | 0
(United Kingdom) E Head | 4 | 4
(United Kingdom) W Beamish | 6 | 6

Quarterfinals
(France) S Lenglen | 6 | 6
(United Kingdom) W Beamish | 0 | 0

=== Bottom half ===
==== Section 3 ====
First round
(United Kingdom) Norah Middleton | 3 | 2
(United Kingdom) Joan Fry | 6 | 6
(United Kingdom) Peggy Saunders | 6 | 6
(United Kingdom) Joan Ridley | 1 | 0
(United Kingdom) CJ Tyrell | 7 | 6 | 7
Q | (United Kingdom) Eileen Bennett | 5 | 8 | 5
(South Africa) Mrs WG Lowe | 8 | 13
(United Kingdom) Joan Reid-Thomas | 6 | 11
(United Kingdom) JL Colegate | 6 | 6
(United Kingdom) Mrs Bruce-May | 2 | 4
(United Kingdom) Ermyntrude Harvey | 2 | 4
(United Kingdom) Evelyn Colyer | 6 | 6
(Australia) Daphne Akhurst | 6 | 7
(United Kingdom) Mrs HB Weston | 3 | 5
(Republic of Ireland) Mrs MP Tomlinson | 2 | 6 | 2
(United Kingdom) Doris Craddock | 6 | 2 | 6

Second round
(United Kingdom) J Fry | 6 | 6
(United Kingdom) M Saunders | 1 | 4
(United Kingdom) CJ Tyrell | 5 | 6
(South Africa) Mrs WG Lowe | 7 | 8
(United Kingdom) JL Colegate | 16 | 8 | 2
(United Kingdom) E Colyer | 2 | 10 | 6
(Australia) D Akhurst | 7 | 5 | 6
(United Kingdom) D Craddock | 5 | 7 | 4

Third round
(United Kingdom) J Fry | 7 | 6
(South Africa) Mrs WG Lowe | 5 | 1
(United Kingdom) E Colyer | 6 | 4 | 4
(Australia) D Akhurst | 4 | 6 | 6

Quarterfinals
(United Kingdom) J Fry | 2 | 6 | 6
(Australia) D Akhurst | 6 | 4 | 3

==== Section 4 ====
First round
(France) Marguerite Billout | 4 | 6 | 11
(United Kingdom) Joan Lycett | 6 | 3 | 9
(United Kingdom) Violet Pinckney | 9 | 6
Q | (United Kingdom) VB Southam | 7 | 2
(Australia) Floris St. George | 2 | 6 | 6
Q | (United Kingdom) Sybil Johnson | 6 | 2 | 2
(United Kingdom) Marie Hazel | 6 | 6
(United Kingdom) Enid Clarke | 4 | 3
(United Kingdom) Mary McIlquham | 6 | 5 | 7
(United Kingdom) R Watson | 4 | 7 | 5
(United Kingdom) Mabel Clayton | 6 | 5 | 6
(United Kingdom) Eleanor Rose | 3 | 7 | 3
(United Kingdom) Phoebe Watson | 2 | 6
(United States) Anna Harper | 6 | 8
(United Kingdom) Sylvia Lumley-Ellis | 6 | 3 | 1
(Netherlands) Kea Bouman | 4 | 6 | 6

Second round
(France) M Billout | 6 | 6
(United Kingdom) V Pinckney | 4 | 2
(Australia) F St. George | 6 | 5 | 3
(United Kingdom) M Hazel | 4 | 7 | 6
(United Kingdom) M McIlquham | 6 | 6
(United Kingdom) E Rose | 4 | 2
(United States) A Harper | 6 | 6
(Netherlands) K Bouman | 3 | 1

Third round
(France) M Billout | 6 | 3 | 6
(United Kingdom) M Hazel | 3 | 6 | 2
(United Kingdom) M McIlquham | 6 | 1 | 13
(United States) A Harper | 4 | 6 | 11

Quarterfinals
(France) M Billout | 6 | 6
(United Kingdom) M McIlquham | 3 | 3

| Preceded by 1925 French Championships | Grand Slams; Women's Singles | Succeeded by 1925 U.S. National Championships |
