= 1929 Wimbledon Championships – Women's doubles =

Women's doubles
- 1929 Wimbledon Championships

Final
- Champions: (United Kingdom) Peggy Michell (United Kingdom) Phoebe Watson
- Runners-up: (United Kingdom) Phyllis Covell (United Kingdom) Dorothy Shepherd-Barron
- Score: 6–4, 8–6

Details
- Draw: 48 (5Q)
- Seeds: 4

Events
Singles	men	women		boys	girls
Doubles	men	women	mixed	boys	girls
- Wimbledon Championships

Peggy Michell and Phoebe Watson successfully defended their title, defeating Phyllis Covell and Dorothy Shepherd-Barron in the final, 6–4, 8–6 to win the ladies' doubles tennis title at the 1929 Wimbledon Championships.

== Seeds ==
1. (United Kingdom) Betty Nuthall / (United States) Elizabeth Ryan (semifinals)
2. (United Kingdom) Peggy Michell / (United Kingdom) Phoebe Watson (champions)
3. (United Kingdom) Phyllis Covell / (United Kingdom) Dorothy Shepherd-Barron (final)
4. (South Africa) Bobbie Heine / (South Africa) Alida Neave (first round)

Click on the seed number of a player to go to their draw section.

== Draw ==
Key

- Q = Qualifier
- WC = Wild card
- LL = Lucky loser
- Alt = Alternate
- ITF = ITF entry
- PR = Protected ranking
- SR = Special ranking
- SE = Special exempt
- JE = Junior exempt
- JR = Junior Accelerator Programme entrant
- CO = College Accelerator Programme entrant
- NG = Next Gen Accelerator Program entrant
- w/o = Walkover
- r = Retired
- d = Defaulted

=== Finals ===
Quarterfinals
2	(United Kingdom) Peggy Michell (United Kingdom) Phoebe Watson	9	6
(United Kingdom) Sybil Johnson (United Kingdom) Eleanor Rose	7	1
(United Kingdom) Ermyntrude Harvey (United Kingdom) Mary McIlquham	6	6
(Netherlands) Kea Bouman (Netherlands) Madzy Couquerque	1	3
1	(United Kingdom) Betty Nuthall (United States) Elizabeth Ryan	6	6
(United Kingdom) Joan Fry (United Kingdom) Gwen Sterry	2	1
3	(United Kingdom) Phyllis Covell (United Kingdom) Dorothy Shepherd-Barron	6	6
(United Kingdom) Joan Lycett (United Kingdom) Joan Ridley	2	2

Semifinals
2	(United Kingdom) Peggy Michell (United Kingdom) Phoebe Watson	6	5	6
(United Kingdom) Ermyntrude Harvey (United Kingdom) Mary McIlquham	4	7	2
1	(United Kingdom) Betty Nuthall (United States) Elizabeth Ryan	4	6	7
3	(United Kingdom) Phyllis Covell (United Kingdom) Dorothy Shepherd-Barron	6	3	9

Final
2	(United Kingdom) Peggy Michell (United Kingdom) Phoebe Watson	6	8
3	(United Kingdom) Phyllis Covell (United Kingdom) Dorothy Shepherd-Barron	4	6

=== Top half ===
==== Section 1 ====
First round

Second round
2	(United Kingdom) Peggy Michell (United Kingdom) Phoebe Watson	6	6
(Germany) Ilse Friedleben (Germany) Toni Schomburgk	2	0
(United Kingdom) JL Colegate (United Kingdom) CJ Tyrrell	6	6
(United Kingdom) Elsie Goldsack (United Kingdom) Dorothy Jameson	4	4
(United Kingdom) Sybil Johnson (United Kingdom) Eleanor Rose	8	6
(United Kingdom) Peggy Pleydell-Bouverie (United Kingdom) Joan Strawson	6	4
(United Kingdom) Mrs HV Edwards (United Kingdom) Davinia Gordon	8	6
Q	(United Kingdom) Dorothy Anderson (United Kingdom) Winifred Bower	6	2

Third round
2	(United Kingdom) M Michell (United Kingdom) P Watson	6	6
(United Kingdom) JL Colegate (United Kingdom) CJ Tyrrell	1	1
(United Kingdom) S Johnson (United Kingdom) E Rose	6	7
(United Kingdom) Mrs HV Edwards (United Kingdom) D Gordon	3	5

Quarterfinals
2	(United Kingdom) M Michell (United Kingdom) P Watson	9	6
(United Kingdom) S Johnson (United Kingdom) E Rose	7	1

==== Section 2 ====
First round
4	(South Africa) Bobbie Heine (South Africa) Alida Neave	6	2	7
(United Kingdom) Ermyntrude Harvey (United Kingdom) Mary McIlquham	2	6	9
(France) Nanette le Besnerais (Italy) Lucia Valerio	w/o
(United Kingdom) Effie Hemmant (United Kingdom) Phyllis Mudford
M French (Republic of Ireland) F Pearson	3	3
(United States) Molla Mallory (South Africa) Audrey de Smidt	6	6
(United States) Edith Cross (United States) Helen Wills	6	6
(France) Simone Barbier (France) Simonne Mathieu	1	1
(France) Jacqueline Gallay (France) Violette Gallay
(Netherlands) Mence Canters (Denmark) Else Dam	w/o
(United Kingdom) Aurea Edgington (United Kingdom) Christabel Hardie	2	4
(United Kingdom) NQ Radcliffe-Platt (United Kingdom) PM Radcliffe	6	6
(United Kingdom) Dorothy Round (United Kingdom) Naomi Trentham	6	2	8
Q	(United Kingdom) Marjorie Stork (United Kingdom) MA Thomas	1	6	6
(Netherlands) Kea Bouman (Netherlands) Madzy Couquerque	6	6
Q	(United Kingdom) D Bourne (United Kingdom) Helen Bourne	1	2

Second round
(United Kingdom) E Harvey (United Kingdom) M McIlquham	6	6
(United Kingdom) E Hemmant (United Kingdom) P Mudford	3	4
(United States) M Mallory (South Africa) A de Smidt	1	7	1
(United States) E Cross (United States) H Wills	6	5	6
(France) J Gallay (France) V Gallay	2	3
(United Kingdom) NQ Radcliffe-Platt (United Kingdom) PM Radcliffe	6	6
(United Kingdom) D Round (United Kingdom) N Trentham	0	2
(Netherlands) K Bouman (Netherlands) M Couquerque	6	6

Third round
(United Kingdom) E Harvey (United Kingdom) M McIlquham	6	8	6
(United States) E Cross (United States) H Wills	4	10	3
(United Kingdom) NQ Radcliffe-Platt (United Kingdom) PM Radcliffe	6	6	0
(Netherlands) K Bouman (Netherlands) M Couquerque	8	1	6

Quarterfinals
(United Kingdom) E Harvey (United Kingdom) M McIlquham	6	6
(Netherlands) K Bouman (Netherlands) M Couquerque	1	3

The nationality of M French is unknown.

=== Bottom half ===
==== Section 3 ====
First round
1	(United Kingdom) Betty Nuthall (United States) Elizabeth Ryan
(United Kingdom) Violet Chamberlain (United Kingdom) Margaret Stocks	w/o
(United Kingdom) Mrs Bruce-May (United Kingdom) Enid Clarke
(France) Simone Kleinadel (France) Jeanne Vaussard	w/o
(United Kingdom) Evelyn Colyer (United Kingdom) Dorothy Hill	4	6	6
Q	(United Kingdom) ES Stokes (United Kingdom) EZ Stokes	6	0	2
(United Kingdom) Eileen Bennett (Australia) Esna Robertson	w/o
(United Kingdom) Evelyn Dearman (United Kingdom) Beatrice Feltham
(Belgium) Josane Sigart (Belgium) Yvonne Sigart	3	4
(Republic of Ireland) Lavender Campbell (Greece) I Lenos	6	6
(United Kingdom) Enid Broadbridge (United Kingdom) Irene Maltby	5	4
(India) Jenny Sandison (United Kingdom) Phyllis Satterthwaite	7	6
(United Kingdom) Betty Dix (United Kingdom) Elsa Haylock	6	8
(Germany) Cilly Aussem (Germany) Irmgard Rost	1	6
(United Kingdom) Cecily Marriott (United Kingdom) Madge Slaney	4	1
(United Kingdom) Joan Fry (United Kingdom) Gwen Sterry	6	6

Second round
1	(United Kingdom) B Nuthall (United States) E Ryan	6	6
(United Kingdom) Mrs Bruce-May (United Kingdom) E Clarke	1	0
(United Kingdom) E Colyer (United Kingdom) D Hill	7	6
(United Kingdom) E Dearman (United Kingdom) B Feltham	5	0
(Republic of Ireland) L Campbell (Greece) I Lenos	6	6
(India) J Sandison (United Kingdom) P Satterthwaite	3	3
(United Kingdom) M Dix (United Kingdom) E Haylock	4	5
(United Kingdom) J Fry (United Kingdom) G Sterry	6	7

Third round
1	(United Kingdom) B Nuthall (United States) E Ryan	6	6
(United Kingdom) E Colyer (United Kingdom) D Hill	4	4
(Republic of Ireland) L Campbell (Greece) I Lenos	0	6	1
(United Kingdom) J Fry (United Kingdom) G Sterry	6	4	6

Quarterfinals
1	(United Kingdom) B Nuthall (United States) E Ryan	6	6
(United Kingdom) J Fry (United Kingdom) G Sterry	2	1

==== Section 4 ====
First round

Second round
3	(United Kingdom) Phyllis Covell (United Kingdom) Dorothy Shepherd-Barron	2	7	6
(United Kingdom) Winifred Beamish (United Kingdom) Agnes Tuckey	6	5	0
(South Africa) Doreen Cole (South Africa) Billie Tapscott	6	2	6
(United Kingdom) A Clayton (United Kingdom) Nancy Lyle	3	6	8
(United States) May Bundy (United States) Marjorie Morrill	6	6
Q	(United Kingdom) KEC Lewis (United Kingdom) Betty Uber	4	3
(United Kingdom) Joan Lycett (United Kingdom) Joan Ridley	6	6
(Republic of Ireland) Phoebe Blair-White (United Kingdom) FM Fleming	4	2

Third round
3	(United Kingdom) P Covell (United Kingdom) D Shepherd-Barron	6	6
(United Kingdom) A Clayton (United Kingdom) N Lyle	1	0
(United States) M Bundy (United States) M Morrill	3	2
(United Kingdom) J Lycett (United Kingdom) J Ridley	6	6

Quarterfinals
3	(United Kingdom) P Covell (United Kingdom) D Shepherd-Barron	6	6
(United Kingdom) J Lycett (United Kingdom) J Ridley	2	2
