= 1925 Wimbledon Championships – Women's doubles =

Women's doubles
- 1925 Wimbledon Championships

Final
- Champions: (France) Suzanne Lenglen (United States) Elizabeth Ryan
- Runners-up: (United Kingdom) Kathleen Bridge (United Kingdom) Mary McIlquham
- Score: 6–2, 6–2

Details
- Draw: 39 (4Q)
- Seeds: –

Events
| Singles | men | women | | boys | girls |
| Doubles | men | women | mixed | boys | girls |
- Wimbledon Championships

Hazel Wightman and Helen Wills were the defending champions, but did not participate.

Suzanne Lenglen and Elizabeth Ryan defeated Kathleen Bridge and Mary McIlquham in the final, 6–2, 6–2 to win the ladies' doubles tennis title at the 1925 Wimbledon Championships.

== Draw ==
Key

- Q = Qualifier
- WC = Wild card
- LL = Lucky loser
- Alt = Alternate
- ITF = ITF entry
- PR = Protected ranking
- SR = Special ranking
- SE = Special exempt
- JE = Junior exempt
- JR = Junior Accelerator Programme entrant
- CO = College Accelerator Programme entrant
- NG = Next Gen Accelerator Program entrant
- w/o = Walkover
- r = Retired
- d = Defaulted

=== Finals ===
Quarterfinals
(United Kingdom) Winifred Beamish (United Kingdom) Enid Clarke | 6 | 9
(France) Élisabeth Macready (United Kingdom) Agnes Tuckey | 3 | 7
(Australia) Esna Boyd (Australia) Lorna Utz | 0 | 2
(France) Suzanne Lenglen (United States) Elizabeth Ryan | 6 | 6
(United Kingdom) Dorothea Lambert Chambers (United Kingdom) Ermyntrude Harvey | 6 | 6
(United Kingdom) Mildred Guyer (United Kingdom) Gwen Sterry | 1 | 3
(South Africa) Mrs WG Lowe (South Africa) Millicent Pitt | 2 | 6 | 1
(United Kingdom) Kathleen Bridge (United Kingdom) Mary McIlquham | 6 | 4 | 6

Semifinals
(United Kingdom) Winifred Beamish (United Kingdom) Enid Clarke | 0 | 2
(France) Suzanne Lenglen (United States) Elizabeth Ryan | 6 | 6
(United Kingdom) Dorothea Lambert Chambers (United Kingdom) Ermyntrude Harvey | 1 | 6 | 4
(United Kingdom) Kathleen Bridge (United Kingdom) Mary McIlquham | 6 | 2 | 6

Final
(France) Suzanne Lenglen (United States) Elizabeth Ryan | 6 | 6
(United Kingdom) Kathleen Bridge (United Kingdom) Mary McIlquham | 2 | 2

=== Top half ===
==== Section 1 ====
First round

Second round
(United Kingdom) Mrs Bruce-May; Mrs van Praagh | 6 | 7 | 8
(United Kingdom) Joan Ridley (United Kingdom) Mrs HB Weston | 3 | 9 | 10
(United Kingdom) Winifred Beamish (United Kingdom) Enid Clarke | 6 | 7
(Netherlands) Kea Bouman (Netherlands) Mence Canters | 2 | 5
(France) Elizabeth Macready (United Kingdom) Agnes Tuckey
(United Kingdom) Ariadne Rodocanachi (United Kingdom) MK Taylor | w/o
(United Kingdom) Phyllis Satterthwaite (United Kingdom) R Watson | 6 | 6
(India) Yolande Gough (United Kingdom) BG Morrison | 1 | 1

Third round
(United Kingdom) J Ridley (United Kingdom) Mrs HB Weston | 4 | 1
(United Kingdom) W Beamish (United Kingdom) E Clarke | 6 | 6
(France) E Macready (United Kingdom) A Tuckey | 7 | 6
(United Kingdom) P Satterthwaite (United Kingdom) R Watson | 5 | 4

Quarterfinals
(United Kingdom) W Beamish (United Kingdom) E Clarke | 6 | 9
(France) E Macready (United Kingdom) A Tuckey | 3 | 7

The nationality of Mrs van Praagh is unknown.

==== Section 2 ====
First round
(United Kingdom) Evelyn Colyer (United Kingdom) Joan Lycett | 0 | 4
(France) Suzanne Lenglen (United States) Elizabeth Ryan | 6 | 6
(United Kingdom) JL Colegate (United Kingdom) CJ Tyrrell | 6 | 6
(United Kingdom) Eileen Bennett (United Kingdom) Dorothy Hill | 2 | 4
Q | (United Kingdom) Mrs WL Hollick (United Kingdom) Cecily Marriott | 7 | 2 | 5
(United Kingdom) Peggy Dransfield (United Kingdom) Hazel Hogarth | 5 | 6 | 6
(United Kingdom) Betty Dix (United Kingdom) Phoebe Watson | 7 | 5 | 6
(United Kingdom) Doris Craddock (United Kingdom) Mabel Mavrogordato | 5 | 7 | 3

Second round
Q | (United Kingdom) E Phayre (United Kingdom) MK Phayre | 1 | 8 | 8
(United Kingdom) C Beckingham (United Kingdom) EM Beckingham | 6 | 6 | 6
(Australia) E Boyd (Australia) L Utz | 6 | 6
(United Kingdom) M Clayton (Republic of Ireland) Mrs MP Tomlinson | 1 | 2
(France) S Lenglen (United States) E Ryan | 6 | 6
(United Kingdom) JL Colegate (United Kingdom) CJ Tyrrell | 0 | 2
(United Kingdom) P Dransfield (United Kingdom) H Hogarth | 6 | 2 | 8
(United Kingdom) M Dix (United Kingdom) P Watson | 2 | 6 | 6

Third round
Q | (United Kingdom) E Phayre (United Kingdom) MK Phayre | 3 | 2
(Australia) E Boyd (Australia) L Utz | 6 | 6
(France) S Lenglen (United States) E Ryan | 6 | 6
(United Kingdom) P Dransfield (United Kingdom) H Hogarth | 0 | 2

Quarterfinals
(Australia) E Boyd (Australia) L Utz | 0 | 2
(France) S Lenglen (United States) E Ryan | 6 | 6

=== Bottom half ===
==== Section 3 ====
First round
(United Kingdom) Eleanor Rose (United Kingdom) Vera Youle | 1 | 1
(United Kingdom) Dorothea Lambert Chambers (United Kingdom) Ermyntrude Harvey | 6 | 6
(United Kingdom) L Dixon (United States) Anne Townsend | 4 | 0
(United Kingdom) NQ Radcliffe-Platt (United Kingdom) PM Radcliffe | 6 | 6
(United Kingdom) Marie Hazel (United Kingdom) Norah Middleton | 6 | 4 | 3
(New Zealand) Mrs WJ Melody (Australia) Floris St. George | 4 | 6 | 6

Second round
(United Kingdom) D Lambert Chambers (United Kingdom) E Harvey | 6 | 6
(United Kingdom) NQ Radcliffe-Platt (United Kingdom) PM Radcliffe | 2 | 2
(New Zealand) Mrs WJ Melody (Australia) F St. George | 2 | 3
(Australia) Daphne Akhurst (Australia) Sylvia Harper | 6 | 6
(United Kingdom) Mrs AK Guyer (United Kingdom) Gwen Sterry | 7 | 6 | 6
(United Kingdom) Mrs A Clayton (United Kingdom) Dorothy Holman | 9 | 4 | 0
Q | (United Kingdom) Mary Burgess-Smith (United Kingdom) Christabel Hardie | 2 | 1
(United Kingdom) Mrs J O'Neill (United Kingdom) Hilary Stebbing | 6 | 6

Third round
(United Kingdom) D Lambert Chambers (United Kingdom) E Harvey | 6 | 6
(Australia) D Akhurst (Australia) S Harper | 4 | 1
(United Kingdom) M Guyer (United Kingdom) G Sterry | 6 | 6
(United Kingdom) Mrs J O'Neill (United Kingdom) H Stebbing | 4 | 1

Quarterfinals
(United Kingdom) D Lambert Chambers (United Kingdom) E Harvey | 6 | 6
(United Kingdom) M Guyer (United Kingdom) G Sterry | 1 | 3

==== Section 4 ====
First round

Second round
(South Africa) Mrs WG Lowe (South Africa) Millicent Pitt | 6 | 6
(United Kingdom) Peggy Pleydell-Bouverie (United Kingdom) Joan Reid-Thomas | 2 | 2
Q | (United Kingdom) Joan Barrett (United Kingdom) Joyce Brown | 4 | 6 | 6
Mrs DC Bousfield (United Kingdom) CI Kalber | 6 | 3 | 3
(United Kingdom) Enid Head (United Kingdom) Irene Maltby | 6 | 0 | 0
(United Kingdom) Joan Fry (United Kingdom) Sylvia Lumley-Ellis | 3 | 6 | 6
(United Kingdom) Kathleen Bridge (United Kingdom) Mary McIlquham | 6 | 7
(United Kingdom) Kitty McKane (United Kingdom) Peggy Saunders | 3 | 5

Third round
(South Africa) Mrs WG Lowe (South Africa) M Pitt | 4 | 6 | 6
Q | (United Kingdom) J Barrett (United Kingdom) J Brown | 6 | 3 | 4
(United Kingdom) J Fry (United Kingdom) S Lumley-Ellis | 7 | 4 | 3
(United Kingdom) K Bridge (United Kingdom) M McIlquham | 5 | 6 | 6

Quarterfinals
(South Africa) Mrs WG Lowe (South Africa) M Pitt | 2 | 6 | 1
(United Kingdom) K Bridge (United Kingdom) M McIlquham | 6 | 4 | 6

The nationalities of Mrs DC Bousfield and CI Kalber are unknown.
