= 1929 Wimbledon Championships – Women's singles =

Women's singles
- 1929 Wimbledon Championships

Final
- Champion: (United States) Helen Wills
- Runner-up: (United States) Helen Jacobs
- Score: 6–1, 6–2

Details
- Draw: 96 (10Q)
- Seeds: 8

Events
Singles	men	women		boys	girls
Doubles	men	women	mixed	boys	girls
- Wimbledon Championships

Helen Wills successfully defended her title, defeating Helen Jacobs in the final, 6–1, 6–2 to win the ladies' singles tennis title at the 1929 Wimbledon Championships.

== Seeds ==
1. (United States) Helen Wills (champion)
2. (Spain) Lilí de Álvarez (fourth round)
3. (United Kingdom) Betty Nuthall (third round)
4. (United Kingdom) Eileen Bennett (fourth round)
5. (United States) Helen Jacobs (final)
6. (South Africa) Bobbie Heine (quarterfinals)
7. (France) Simonne Mathieu (third round)
8. (Germany) Cilly Aussem (fourth round)

Click on the seed number of a player to go to their draw section.

== Draw ==
Key

- Q = Qualifier
- WC = Wild card
- LL = Lucky loser
- Alt = Alternate
- ITF = ITF entry
- PR = Protected ranking
- SR = Special ranking
- SE = Special exempt
- JE = Junior exempt
- JR = Junior Accelerator Programme entrant
- CO = College Accelerator Programme entrant
- NG = Next Gen Accelerator Program entrant
- w/o = Walkover
- r = Retired
- d = Defaulted

=== Finals ===
Quarterfinals
1	(United States) Helen Wills	6	6
6	(South Africa) Bobbie Heine	2	4
(United Kingdom) Elsie Goldsack	6	6
(South Africa) Billie Tapscott	3	3
(United Kingdom) Mary McIlquham	1	0
5	(United States) Helen Jacobs	6	6
(United States) May Bundy	3	2
(United Kingdom) Joan Ridley	6	6

Semifinals
1	(United States) Helen Wills	6	6
(United Kingdom) Elsie Goldsack	2	0
5	(United States) Helen Jacobs	6	6
(United Kingdom) Joan Ridley	2	2

Final
1	(United States) Helen Wills	6	6
5	(United States) Helen Jacobs	1	2

=== Top half ===
==== Section 1 ====
First round

Second round
1	(United States) Helen Wills	6	6
(United Kingdom) GE Tomblin	0	0
(Germany) Toni Schomburgk
(Italy) Lucia Valerio	w/o
(United Kingdom) Cecily Marriott	4	6	2
(United Kingdom) Gwen Sterry	6	4	6
(Belgium) Josane Sigart	6	6	9
(United Kingdom) Joan Strawson	2	8	7

Third round
1	(United States) H Wills	6	6
(Germany) T Schomburgk	0	0
(United Kingdom) G Sterry	6	4
(Belgium) J Sigart	8	6

Fourth round
1	(United States) H Wills	6	6
(Belgium) J Sigart	2	3

==== Section 2 ====
First round

Second round
6	(South Africa) Bobbie Heine	6	6
Q	(United Kingdom) Gladys Thompson	3	3
(France) Simone Kleinadel	6	3	6
(Republic of Ireland) Lavender Campbell	2	6	2
(United Kingdom) Phyllis Covell
(Netherlands) Mence Canters	w/o
(France) Jacqueline Gallay	1	2
(United Kingdom) Winifred Beamish	6	6

Third round
6	(South Africa) E Heine	6	6
(France) S Kleinadel	2	3
(United Kingdom) P Covell	6	4	6
(United Kingdom) W Beamish	4	6	3

Fourth round
6	(South Africa) E Heine	6	7
(United Kingdom) P Covell	2	5

==== Section 3 ====
First round
3	(United Kingdom) Betty Nuthall	6	6
Q	(United Kingdom) Vera Marshall	1	4
(United Kingdom) Dorothy Round	6	4	8
(Germany) Ilse Friedleben	3	6	6
(United States) Edith Cross	6	4	5
(United Kingdom) Enid Clarke	3	6	7
(United Kingdom) Betty Dix	6	2	5
(United Kingdom) Peggy Michell	4	6	7
(United Kingdom) Elsie Goldsack	6	6
Q	(United Kingdom) Helen Bourne	3	4
(Denmark) Else Dam	6	6
(United Kingdom) Winifred Bower	4	1
(United Kingdom) JL Colegate	2	5
(United Kingdom) Christabel Hardie	6	7
(Republic of Ireland) Phoebe Blair-White	7	3	2
(United Kingdom) Elsa Haylock	5	6	6

Second round
3	(United Kingdom) B Nuthall	6	6
(United Kingdom) D Round	1	1
(United Kingdom) E Clarke	6	3	4
(United Kingdom) M Michell	2	6	6
(United Kingdom) E Goldsack	6	6
(Denmark) E Dam	3	3
(United Kingdom) C Hardie	2	6
(United Kingdom) E Haylock	6	8

Third round
3	(United Kingdom) B Nuthall	3	3
(United Kingdom) M Michell	6	6
(United Kingdom) E Goldsack	6	6
(United Kingdom) E Haylock	3	0

Fourth round
(United Kingdom) M Michell	6	5	0
(United Kingdom) E Goldsack	4	7	6

==== Section 4 ====
First round
7	(France) Simonne Mathieu	6	6
(Netherlands) Madzy Couquerque	2	2
(United Kingdom) Phyllis Whitley	4	6	10
Q	(United Kingdom) Gethyn Harry	6	4	8
(India) Jenny Sandison	2	3
(France) Simone Barbier	6	6
(United Kingdom) Beatrice Feltham	5	3
(South Africa) Billie Tapscott	7	6
Q	(United Kingdom) Sybil Johnson	6	6
Q	(United Kingdom) Betty Boas	3	1
(United Kingdom) Phyllis Satterthwaite	7	4	6
(United Kingdom) Madge Slaney	5	6	2
Q	(United Kingdom) Margaret Mellows	2	6	8
(United Kingdom) Davinia Gordon	6	1	10
(United Kingdom) Violet Chamberlain	6	6
(United Kingdom) Aurea Edgington	3	2

Second round
7	(France) S Mathieu	7	6
(United Kingdom) P Whitley	5	4
(France) S Barbier	6	1	1
(South Africa) D Tapscott	4	6	6
Q	(United Kingdom) S Johnson	5	3
(United Kingdom) P Satterthwaite	7	6
(United Kingdom) D Gordon	1	6	3
(United Kingdom) V Chamberlain	6	2	6

Third round
7	(France) S Mathieu	7	1	3
(South Africa) D Tapscott	5	6	6
(United Kingdom) P Satterthwaite	3	7
(United Kingdom) V Chamberlain	6	9

Fourth round
(South Africa) D Tapscott	6	5	6
(United Kingdom) V Chamberlain	3	7	4

=== Bottom half ===
==== Section 5 ====
First round
2	(Spain) Lilí de Álvarez	6	6
(United Kingdom) Mrs Bruce-May	0	2
(France) Julie Serpieri	6	6
(Greece) I Lenos	0	3
(United Kingdom) Mary Heeley	1	8	0
(United Kingdom) Dorothy Hill	6	6	6
(United Kingdom) Dorothy Anderson	1	1
(United States) Elizabeth Ryan	6	6
(United Kingdom) Eleanor Rose	6	6
(United Kingdom) Mrs HV Edwards	2	3
(United Kingdom) Mary McIlquham	6	10
(South Africa) Doreen Cole	0	8
(United Kingdom) Effie Hemmant
(United Kingdom) Margaret Stocks	w/o
(Republic of Ireland) F Pearson	2	1
(United Kingdom) Phyllis Mudford	6	6

Second round
2	(Spain) E de Álvarez	6	6
(France) J Serpieri	2	2
(United Kingdom) D Hill	0	2
(United States) E Ryan	6	6
(United Kingdom) E Rose	1	2
(United Kingdom) M McIlquham	6	6
(United Kingdom) E Hemmant	3	0
(United Kingdom) P Mudford	6	6

Third round
2	(Spain) E de Álvarez	6	8
(United States) E Ryan	4	6
(United Kingdom) M McIlquham	3	6	6
(United Kingdom) P Mudford	6	0	2

Fourth round
2	(Spain) E de Álvarez	4	6	2
(United Kingdom) M McIlquham	6	4	6

==== Section 6 ====
First round
5	(United States) Helen Jacobs	6	6
(South Africa) Alida Neave	0	3
(France) Violette Gallay	0	10
(Germany) Irmgard Rost	6	12
(United Kingdom) Joan Lycett	6	6
Q	(United Kingdom) Evelyn Goldsworth	4	4
(France) Jeanne Vaussard
Q	(United Kingdom) Vera Montgomery	w/o
(United Kingdom) Joan Fry	6	7
(United Kingdom) Enid Broadbridge	2	5
(France) Elizabeth Macready	4	2
(United Kingdom) Dorothy Shepherd-Barron	6	6
(United Kingdom) Dorothy Jameson
(Switzerland) Lolette Payot	w/o
(United Kingdom) Phoebe Watson	7	6
(United Kingdom) Evelyn Colyer	5	2

Second round
5	(United States) H Jacobs	6	6
(Germany) I Rost	3	0
(United Kingdom) J Lycett	7	6
Q	(United Kingdom) V Montgomery	5	3
(United Kingdom) J Fry	6	6
(United Kingdom) D Shepherd-Barron	3	4
(United Kingdom) D Jameson	4	5
(United Kingdom) P Watson	6	7

Third round
5	(United States) H Jacobs	6	6
(United Kingdom) J Lycett	2	2
(United Kingdom) J Fry	6	6
(United Kingdom) P Watson	1	4

Fourth round
5	(United States) H Jacobs	6	6
(United Kingdom) J Fry	3	4

==== Section 7 ====
First round

Second round
4	(United Kingdom) Eileen Bennett	6	6
(France) Nanette le Besnerais	1	1
(United States) Marjorie Morrill	6	6
Q	(United Kingdom) DE Munro	0	1
(Australia) Esna Robertson	w/o
(United States) May Bundy
(United Kingdom) Naomi Trentham	4	3
(United Kingdom) Ermyntrude Harvey	6	6

Third round
4	(United Kingdom) E Bennett	6	6
(United States) M Morrill	3	3
(United States) M Bundy	6	4	6
(United Kingdom) E Harvey	2	6	4

Fourth round
4	(United Kingdom) E Bennett	6	4	4
(United States) M Bundy	3	6	6

==== Section 8 ====
First round

Second round
8	(Germany) Cilly Aussem	6	6
(United Kingdom) CJ Tyrrell	0	2
(South Africa) Audrey de Smidt	3	6	5
(United States) Molla Mallory	6	3	7
(Belgium) Yvonne Sigart	0	1
(United Kingdom) Joan Ridley	6	6
(United Kingdom) Nancy Lyle	6	1
(Netherlands) Kea Bouman	8	6

Third round
8	(Germany) C Aussem	6	6
(United States) M Mallory	4	1
(United Kingdom) J Ridley	6	6
(Netherlands) K Bouman	4	3

Fourth round
8	(Germany) C Aussem	6	1
(United Kingdom) J Ridley	8	6

Preceded by 1929 French Championships	Grand Slams; Women's Singles	Succeeded by 1929 U.S. National Championships
