= Elizabeth Hill =

Elizabeth Hill may refer to:

- Elizabeth Hill (swimmer) (born 1985), American swimmer
- Elizabeth Hill (linguist) (1900–1996), Russian-born British academic linguist
- Elizabeth Hill (screenwriter) (1901–1978), American screenwriter
- Elizabeth "Liz" Hill (active from 1983), American swimming coach, see Denny Hill and Liz Hill
- Elizabeth Hill (figure skater), American skater, see 1996 United States Figure Skating Championships

== See also ==
- Betty Hill (disambiguation)
- Elizabeth Hill Boone (born 1948), American art historian, ethnohistorian and academic
- Betsy Hill, American rugby union player
- Eliza Trask Hill (1840–1908), American activist, journalist, and philanthropist
- Hill (surname)
