= 1927 Wightman Cup =

International women's tennis competition

Details
- Edition: 5th

Champion
- Winning nation: United States

The 1927 Wightman Cup was the fifth edition of the annual women's team tennis competition between the United States and Great Britain. It was held at the West Side Tennis Club in Forest Hills, Queens in New York City, NY in the United States.

United States
5
West Side Tennis Club, Forest Hills, New York City, United States
Aug 1927
Grass

Great Britain
2

			1	2	3
1	(United States) (United Kingdom)	Helen Wills; Joan Fry	6; 2	6; 0
2	(United States) (United Kingdom)	Molla Mallory; Kathleen McKane Godfree	6; 4	6; 2
3	(United States) (United Kingdom)	Helen Jacobs; Betty Nuthall	3; 6	6; 2	1; 6
4	(United States) (United Kingdom)	Helen Wills; Kathleen McKane Godfree	6; 1	6; 1
5	(United States) (United Kingdom)	Molla Mallory; Joan Fry	6; 2	11; 9
6	(United States) (United Kingdom)	Eleanor Goss / Charlotte Hosmer Chapin; Gwendolyn Sterry / Betty Hill	7; 5	5; 7	5; 7
7	(United States) (United Kingdom)	Helen Wills / Hazel Hotchkiss Wightman; Kathleen McKane Godfree / Ermyntrude Harvey	6; 4	4; 6	6; 3

== See also ==
- 1927 Davis Cup
