= 1928 Wightman Cup =

International women's tennis competition

Details
- Edition: 6th

Champion
- Winning nation: Great Britain

The 1928 Wightman Cup was the sixth edition of the annual women's team tennis competition between the United States and Great Britain. It was held at the All England Lawn Tennis and Croquet Club in London, England.

Great Britain
4
All England Lawn Tennis and Croquet Club, London, England, United Kingdom
15–16 June 1928
Grass

United States
3

			1	2	3
1	(United Kingdom) (United States)	Phoebe Holcroft Watson; Helen Wills	1; 6	2; 6
2	(United Kingdom) (United States)	Eileen Bennett; Molla Bjurstedt Mallory	6; 1	6; 3
3	(United Kingdom) (United States)	Eileen Bennett; Helen Wills	3; 6	2; 6
4	(United Kingdom) (United States)	Phoebe Holcroft Watson; Molla Bjurstedt Mallory	2; 6	6; 1	6; 2
5	(United Kingdom) (United States)	Betty Nuthall; Helen Jacobs	3; 6	1; 6
6	(United Kingdom) (United States)	Ermyntrude Harvey / Peggy Saunders; Eleanor Goss / Helen Jacobs	6; 4	6; 1
7	(United Kingdom) (United States)	Eileen Bennett / Phoebe Holcroft Watson; Helen Wills / Penelope Anderson	6; 2	6; 1

== See also ==
- 1928 Davis Cup
