= Betty Hill =

Betty Hill may refer to:

- Betty Hill (activist) (1876–1960), American civil rights and women's rights leader
- Betty Hill (tennis), American tennis player in the 1927 Wightman Cup
- Betty Hill (politician) (Margaret Elizabeth "Betty" Hill, 1937–2013), Canadian politician
- Betty Hill (1919–2004), American civil rights activist who, along with her husband, claimed to have been kidnapped by extraterrestrials in the 1961 Barney and Betty Hill incident

== See also ==
- Elizabeth Hill (disambiguation)
- Hill (surname)
