= St George's Hill Open =

Defunct tennis tournament
- Tour: Men's Amateur Tour (1877-1912); Women Amateur Tour (1877-1912); ILTF Men's Amateur Tour (1913-1967); ILTF Women's Amateur Tour (1913-1967)
- Founded: 1881
- Abolished: 1966
- Location: St Georges Hill, Weybridge, Surrey, England.
- Surface: Grass

The St George's Hill Open tournament was founded as the St George's Hill Tournament a men's grass court tennis tournament staged at St Georges Hill Weybridge, Surrey, England in 1881, that ran until 1883, and was not held again. In 1913 the St Georges Hill Lawn Tennis Club was established. In 1922 St Georges Hill LTC started a combined men's and women's tournament the St George's Hill Open this ran as a senior tennis tour event until 1966.

== History ==
The St George's Hill Tournament a men's grass court tennis tournament first staged in 1881 at the Weybridge, Surrey, England. The first winner of the men's singles was England's Algernon Wilfred Milne. In 1913 the St George's Hill Lawn Tennis Club opened. In 1922 a new combined event was established called the St George's Hill Open Tournament this time the grass court tournament ran until 1966.

Though the tournament is no longer a part of any international tour, it is still being staged today and is known as the St George's Hill Open Tennis Tournament.

== Finals ==
=== Men's Singles ===
Incomplete roll

Year	Champions	Runners-up	Score
St.George's Hill Tournament
1881	(England) Wilfred Milne	(United Kingdom of Great Britain and Ireland) B. Hawes	3 sets to 0
1883	(United States) Clarence Clarke	(United Kingdom of Great Britain and Ireland) William Edward Glyn	6-0, 6–4, 8-6
St.George's Hill Open
1922	(South Africa) Brian Norton	(United Kingdom) Charles Roupell	6-0, 6-1
1924	(United Kingdom) Theodore Mavrogordato	(United Kingdom) Tony Buzzard	6-3, 6-0
1925	(Sweden) Carl-Erik von Braun	(United Kingdom) J.S. Heagerty	6-1, 6-3
1926	(United Kingdom) Pat Hughes	(United Kingdom) C.H. Watson	6-1, 6-2
1927	(United Kingdom) Pat Hughes	(United Kingdom) F. R. L. Crawford	6-1, 6-1
1928	(South Africa) Pat Spence	(United Kingdom) Brian Gilbert	6-0, 7-5
1929	(Japan) Ryuki Miki	(United Kingdom) Harry Lee	4-6, 6–3, 7-5
1930	(Japan) Ryuki Miki	(India) Donald Ross Rutnam	6-0, 5–7, 6-2
1931	(Japan) Ryuki Miki	(United Kingdom) Harry Lee	6-3, 6-3
1932	(United Kingdom) Frank H. D. Wilde	(United Kingdom) Colin Ritchie	6-3, 6-1
1933	(United Kingdom) Ted Avory	(United Kingdom) Bob Tinkler	?
1934	(United Kingdom) Ted Avory	(United Kingdom) Jack Lysaght	8-6, 6-4
1935	(New Zealand) Buster Andrews	(United Kingdom) Dickie Ritchie	7-5, 3–6, 6-1
1936	(United Kingdom) Harry Lee	(United Kingdom) Ted Avory	4-6, 6–3, 6-0
1937	(United Kingdom) Eric Filby	(United Kingdom) Charles Russell Harris	6-1, 7-5
1938	(United Kingdom) Nigel G. Sharpe	(United Kingdom) Donald MacPhail	8-6, 6-2
1939	(Argentina) Alejo Domingo Russell	(United Kingdom) Murray Deloford	6-3, 6-4
1940/1945	Not held (due to world war two)		
1947	(Poland) Ignacy Tloczynski	(United Kingdom) George Godsell	6-1, 6-3
1959	(United Kingdom) Julian Coni	(United Kingdom) F. Robinson	6-3, 6-2
1960	(New Zealand) John Roderick McDonald	(India) Vinay Dhawan	11-9, 8-6
1961	(United Kingdom) Malcom Gibb	(United Kingdom) M. Pang	6-2, 6-4
Open era

=== Women's Singles ===
Incomplete roll

Year	Champions	Runners-up	Score
St.George's Hill Open
1922	(United Kingdom) Eleanor Rose	(United Kingdom) Vera Spofforth Youle	6-2 8-6
1924	(United Kingdom) Miss Taylor	(India) Margaret Mangin Hasler	9-7 6-4
1925	(Australia) Esna Boyd	(United Kingdom) Eleanor Rose	6-3 0-6 6-3
1926	(United Kingdom) Eleanor Rose	(United Kingdom) E. Norman	6-2 8-6
1927	(United Kingdom) Dorothy Kemmis-Betty Hill	(United Kingdom) Dorothy Shaw	6-3 6-3
1928	(United Kingdom) Peggy Saunders	(United Kingdom) Ermyntrude Harvey	6-4 6-4
1929	(United Kingdom) Phyllis Howkins Covell	(United Kingdom) Phyllis Mudford	6-3 6-3
1930	(India) Jenny Sandison	(United Kingdom) Vera Montgomery	6-2 6-3
1931	(United Kingdom) Phyllis Mudford	(Australia) Esna Boyd	divided title
1932	(United Kingdom) Nancy Lyle	(United Kingdom) Naomi Trentham	6-0 6-3
1933	(United Kingdom) Phyllis Mudford	(United Kingdom) Peggy Saunders Michell	6-3 6-3
1934	(United Kingdom) Elsie Goldsack Pittman	(United Kingdom) Mary Hardwick	6-4 3-6 6-3
1935	(United States) Helen Wills-Moody	(United Kingdom) Elsie Goldsack Pittman	6-0 6-4
1936	(United Kingdom) Mary Hardwick	(United Kingdom) Elsie Goldsack Pittman	9-7 6-0
1937	(Poland) Jadwiga Jedrzejowska	(United States) Alice Marble	3-6 6-4 6-3
1938	(United States) Alice Marble	(South Africa) Bonnie Heine Miller	6–3, 6-4
1939	(United Kingdom) Jean Nicoll	(United Kingdom) Betty Nuthall	6-2, 6-2
1940/1945	Not held (due to world war two)		
1946	(United Kingdom) Margaret Sharp Lewis	(United Kingdom) Pearl Gannon Panton	divided title
1947	(South Africa) Sheila Piercey Summers	(United Kingdom) Joy Gannon	6-1, 7-5
1959	(United Kingdom) Jenny Wagstaff	(United Kingdom) Lorna Cornell Cawthorn	3-6, 6–1, 6-3
1960	(United Kingdom) Shirley Bloomer Brasher	(United Kingdom) Rosemary Deloford	6-1, 6-2
1961	(United Kingdom) Lorna Cornell Cawthorn	(United Kingdom) Caroline Yates-Bell	6-3 6-3
1964	(United Kingdom) Lorna Cornell Cawthorn	(United Kingdom) Mary McAnally	10-8 6-2
1966	(United Kingdom) Shirley Bloomer Brasher	(United Kingdom) Lorna Greville-Collins	divided title
Open era

== Sources ==
- 1877 to 2012 Finals Results. stevegtennis.com. Steve G Tennis.
- American Lawn Tennis. (1937) New York: American Lawn Tennis Publishing Company.
- Keesing's Contemporary Archives (1935). Amsterdam: Keesing's Limited.
- Nieuwland, Alex (2011–2022). Tournament:St. Georges Hill. Tennis Archives. Netherlands.
- Pathfinder. (1935). Philadelphia, PA, United States: Farm Journal, Incorporated.
- Routledges Sporting Annual. (1883). George Routledge and Sons. London. England.
- St. George's Hill Open Tennis Tournament (Surrey). www.tennisuk.net. Tennis Services UK Limited.
- The Oxnard Daily Courier (1938). Oxnard, California, United States.
