= 82nd Pennsylvania Infantry Regiment =

Union Army infantry regiment

82nd Pennsylvania Volunteer Infantry
- Active: August 1861 - July 13, 1865
- Country: United States
- Allegiance: Union
- Branch: Infantry
- Engagements: Peninsula Campaign; Siege of Yorktown; Battle of Williamsburg; Battle of Seven Pines; Seven Days Battles; Battle of Savage's Station; Battle of White Oak Swamp; Battle of Antietam; Battle of Fredericksburg; Battle of Chancellorsville; Battle of Gettysburg; Bristoe Campaign; Battle of Mine Run; Battle of Spotsylvania Court House (detachment); Battle of Totopotomoy Creek; Battle of Cold Harbor; First Battle of Petersburg; Battle of Fort Stevens; Third Battle of Winchester; Battle of Fisher's Hill; Battle of Cedar Creek; Siege of Petersburg; Battle of Hatcher's Run; Appomattox Campaign; Third Battle of Petersburg; Battle of Sailor's Creek; Battle of Appomattox Court House

The 82nd Pennsylvania Volunteer Infantry was an infantry regiment that served in the Union Army during the American Civil War. It was designated the 31st Pennsylvania Volunteer Infantry until after the Battle of Seven Pines but changed to avoid confusion with the 2nd Pennsylvania Reserve Regiment, which was renumbered.

== Service ==
The 82nd Pennsylvania Infantry was organized at Philadelphia, Pennsylvania for a three-year enlistment in August 1861 and mustered in under the command of Colonel David H. Williams. Company B was organized in Pittsburgh, while the other nine companies were organized in Philadelphia.

The regiment was attached to Graham's Brigade, Buell's (Couch's) Division, Army of the Potomac, October 1861 to March 1862. 2nd Brigade, 1st Division, IV Corps, Army of the Potomac, to July 1862. 3rd Brigade, 1st Division, IV Corps, to September 1862. 3rd Brigade, 3rd Division, VI Corps, Army of the Potomac, to October 1862. 1st Brigade, 3rd Division, VI Corps, to January 1864. Johnson's Island, Sandusky, Ohio, to May 1864. 4th Brigade, 1st Division, VI Corps, Army of the Potomac, to July 1864. 3rd Brigade, 1st Division, VI Corps, Army of the Potomac, and Army of the Shenandoah, to July 1865.

The 82nd Pennsylvania Infantry mustered out of service on July 13, 1865.

== Detailed service ==
Duty in the defenses of Washington, D.C., until March 1862. Advanced on Manassas, Va., March 10–15. Moved to the Virginia Peninsula March 26. Siege of Yorktown April 5-May 4. Battle of Williamsburg May 5. Operations about Bottom's Bridge May 20–23. Battle of Seven Pines May 31-June 1. Seven days before Richmond June 25-July 1. Savage's Station June 29. White Oak Swamp June 30. Malvern Hill July 1. At Harrison's Landing until August 16. Reconnaissance to Malvern Hill August 5–7.Movement to Alexandria, then to Chantilly August 16–30. Chantilly September 1. Maryland Campaign September 6–24. Battle of Antietam September 16–17. Williamsport September 19–20. Duty in Maryland and along the Potomac River until November 1. Movement to Falmouth, Va., November 1–19. Battle of Fredericksburg December 12–15. Burnside's second Campaign. "Mud March" January 20–24, 1863. At Falmouth until April. Chancellorsville Campaign April 27-May 6. Operations about Franklin's Crossing April 29-May 2. Maryes Heights, Fredericksburg, May 3. Salem Heights May 3–4. Banks' Ford May 4. Operations about Deep Run Ravine June 6–13. Gettysburg Campaign June 13-July 24. Battle of Gettysburg July 2–4. Pursuit of Lee July 5–24. At and near Funkstown, Md., July 10–13. At Warrenton and Culpeper until October. Bristoe Campaign October 9–22. Advance to line of the Rappahannock November 7–8. Rappahannock Station November 7. Mine Run Campaign November 26-December 2. Moved to Johnson's Island, Lake Erie, January 6, 1864, and duty there guarding prisoners until May 6. Moved to Washington, D.C., then joined the Army of the Potomac in the field. Rapidan Campaign May 12-June 12. Spotsylvania Court House May 12–21. Assault on the Salient May 12. North Anna River May 23–26. On line of the Pamunkey May 26–28. Totopotomoy May 28–31. Cold Harbor June 1–12. Before Petersburg June 17–18. Jerusalem Plank Road June 22–23. Siege of Petersburg until July 9. Moved to Washington, D.C., July 9–11. Repulse of Early's attack on Washington July 11–12. Snicker's Gap Expedition July 14–18. Sheridan's Shenandoah Valley Campaign August to December. (Old members mustered out September 16, 1864.) Battle of Opequan, Winchester, September 19. Fisher's Hill September 22. Battle of Cedar Creek October 19. Duty in the Shenandoah Valley until December. Ordered to Petersburg, Va., December 1. Siege of Petersburg December 1864 to April 1865. Dabney's Mills, Hatcher's Run, February 5–7, 1865. Fort Fisher, Petersburg, March 25, 1865. Appomattox Campaign March 28-April 9. Assault on and fail of Petersburg April 2. Pursuit of Lee April 3–9. Sailor's Creek April 6. Appomattox Court House April 9. Surrender of Lee and his army. At Farmville and Burkesville until April 23. March to Danville April 23–27, and duty there until May 24. Moved to Richmond, Va., then to Washington, D.C.. May 24-June 3. Corps review June 8.

== Casualties ==
The regiment lost a total of 178 men during service; 5 officers and 106 enlisted men killed or mortally wounded, 67 enlisted men died of disease.

== Commanders ==
- Colonel David H. Williams - discharged February 14, 1863
- Colonel Isaac C. Bassett

== See also ==
- List of Pennsylvania Civil War Units
- Pennsylvania in the Civil War
