= 1930 Wightman Cup =

International women's tennis competition

Details
- Edition: 8th

Champion
- Winning nation: Great Britain

The 1930 Wightman Cup was the 8th edition of the annual competition between the United States and Great Britain. It was held at the All England Lawn Tennis and Croquet Club in London, England on 13–14 June 1930.

Great Britain
4
All England Lawn Tennis and Croquet Club, London, United Kingdom
13–14 June 1930
Grass

United States
3

			1	2	3
1	(United Kingdom) (United States)	Joan Fry; Helen Wills Moody	1; 6	1; 6
2	(United Kingdom) (United States)	Phoebe Holcroft Watson; Helen Jacobs	2; 6	6; 2	6; 4
3	(United Kingdom) (United States)	Phoebe Holcroft Watson; Helen Wills Moody	5; 7	1; 6
4	(United Kingdom) (United States)	Joan Fry; Helen Jacobs	0; 6	3; 6
5	(United Kingdom) (United States)	Phyllis Mudford; Sarah Palfrey	6; 0	6; 2
6	(United Kingdom) (United States)	Joan Fry / Ermyntrude Harvey; Sarah Palfrey / Edith Cross	2; 6	6; 2	6; 4
7	(United Kingdom) (United States)	Phoebe Holcroft Watson / Kathleen McKane Godfree; Helen Jacobs / Helen Wills Moody	7; 5	1; 6	6; 4

== See also ==
- 1931 Davis Cup
