= 1929 Wimbledon Championships =

- Date: 24 June – 6 July
- Edition: 49th
- Category: Grand Slam
- Surface: Grass
- Location: Church Road; SW19, Wimbledon, London, United Kingdom
- Venue: All England Lawn Tennis and Croquet Club

Champions

Men's singles
- (France) Henri Cochet

Women's singles
- (United States) Helen Wills

Men's doubles
- (United States) Wilmer Allison / (United States) John Van Ryn

Women's doubles
- (United Kingdom) Peggy Michell / (United Kingdom) Phoebe Watson

Mixed doubles
- (United States) Frank Hunter / (United States) Helen Wills
← 1928 ·	Wimbledon Championships	· 1930 →

The 1929 Wimbledon Championships took place on the outdoor grass courts at the All England Lawn Tennis and Croquet Club in Wimbledon, London, United Kingdom. The tournament was held from Monday 24 June until Saturday 6 July 1929. It was the 49th staging of the Wimbledon Championships, and the third Grand Slam tennis event of 1929.

== Champions ==
=== Men's singles ===
(France) Henri Cochet defeated (France) Jean Borotra, 6–4, 6–3, 6–4

=== Women's singles ===
(United States) Helen Wills defeated (United States) Helen Jacobs, 6–1, 6–2

=== Men's doubles ===
(United States) Wilmer Allison / (United States) John Van Ryn defeated (United Kingdom) Ian Collins / (United Kingdom) Colin Gregory, 6–4, 5–7, 6–3, 10–12, 6–4

=== Women's doubles ===
(United Kingdom) Peggy Michell / (United Kingdom) Phoebe Watson defeated (United Kingdom) Phyllis Covell / (United Kingdom) Dorothy Shepherd-Barron 6–4, 8–6

=== Mixed doubles ===
(United States) Frank Hunter / (United States) Helen Wills defeated (United Kingdom) Ian Collins / (United Kingdom) Joan Fry, 6–1, 6–4

Preceded by 1929 French Championships	Grand Slams	Succeeded by 1929 U.S. National Championships
