= Denny Hill and Liz Hill =

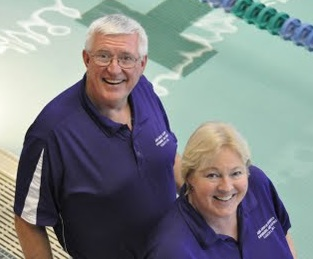
Coaches Denny and Liz Hill

Dennis "Denny" Hill is a hall-of-fame swim coach who coached at Pioneer High School (Ann Arbor, Michigan) for 46 years (1969-2014 Men's Head Coach and 1973-2010 Women's Head Coach). During this tenure as coach, Pioneer High School won 31 Michigan High School State Swim Championships (15 for the men and 16 for the women) and 9 National Dual Meet (Power Points) Championships. The combined teams' overall dual meet record was 1011-128-2 (567-90 for the men and 444-38-2 for the women. The swim program produced 245 National Interscholastic Swim Coaches Association (NISCA) All-American Swimmers for a total of 862 All-American awards. Denny's wife, Elizabeth Hill began coaching with him in 1983 and became co-head coach of the Pioneer men's and women's swim teams in 2005. They both retired from coaching the women's team in 2010 and the men's team in 2014.

== Early life ==
Dennis Hill was born in 1944 to Harry W. and Berniece Hill. His father was a local labor leader and president of Amalgamated Local No. 734 in Lansing, Michigan, and his mother Berniece Hill was the Lansing Postmaster General. A Lansing High School was named after Harry Hill, but the school closed after 10 years due to declining enrollment; the building is now used for vocational training. Denny graduated from Lansing Eastern High School in 1962, which at the time was in the same swim conference as Pioneer High School. Denny's coach at Lansing Eastern High School, Jerry Misner, would become the coach of Pioneer High School and later recommend him for the job at Pioneer. Denny swam for Michigan State University, and was captain of the team in 1966 when they placed 4th at NCAA championships (the school's highest finish ever). He graduated with a degree in Chemistry with plans to go to dental school, but ended up going into teaching. His coaching career began at Ferndale High School in 1967, but he moved to Ann Arbor after being offered by job by Charlie Lott. He was also told by then Huron High School (Ann Arbor, Michigan) swim coach, Pat Wallace, that the city was going to build a 50-meter pool, which would allow Hill and colleagues to start a competitive summer swim program. In 1983, Denny married Elizabeth Lease (daughter of Helen Ernst and Glenn Lease). Liz swam at Pioneer and went on to become an All-American swimmer at the University of Michigan. Liz moved to Texas to teach and coach at MacArthur High School in Houston after graduating from the University of Michigan, but moved back when she married Denny. She became the Pioneer men and women's assistant swim coach in 1984 and was named co-head coach in 2005. Liz has Master of Education Leadership degree from Eastern Michigan University. Denny taught chemistry at Pioneer High School for 39 years and retired from teaching in 2007.

== Career ==
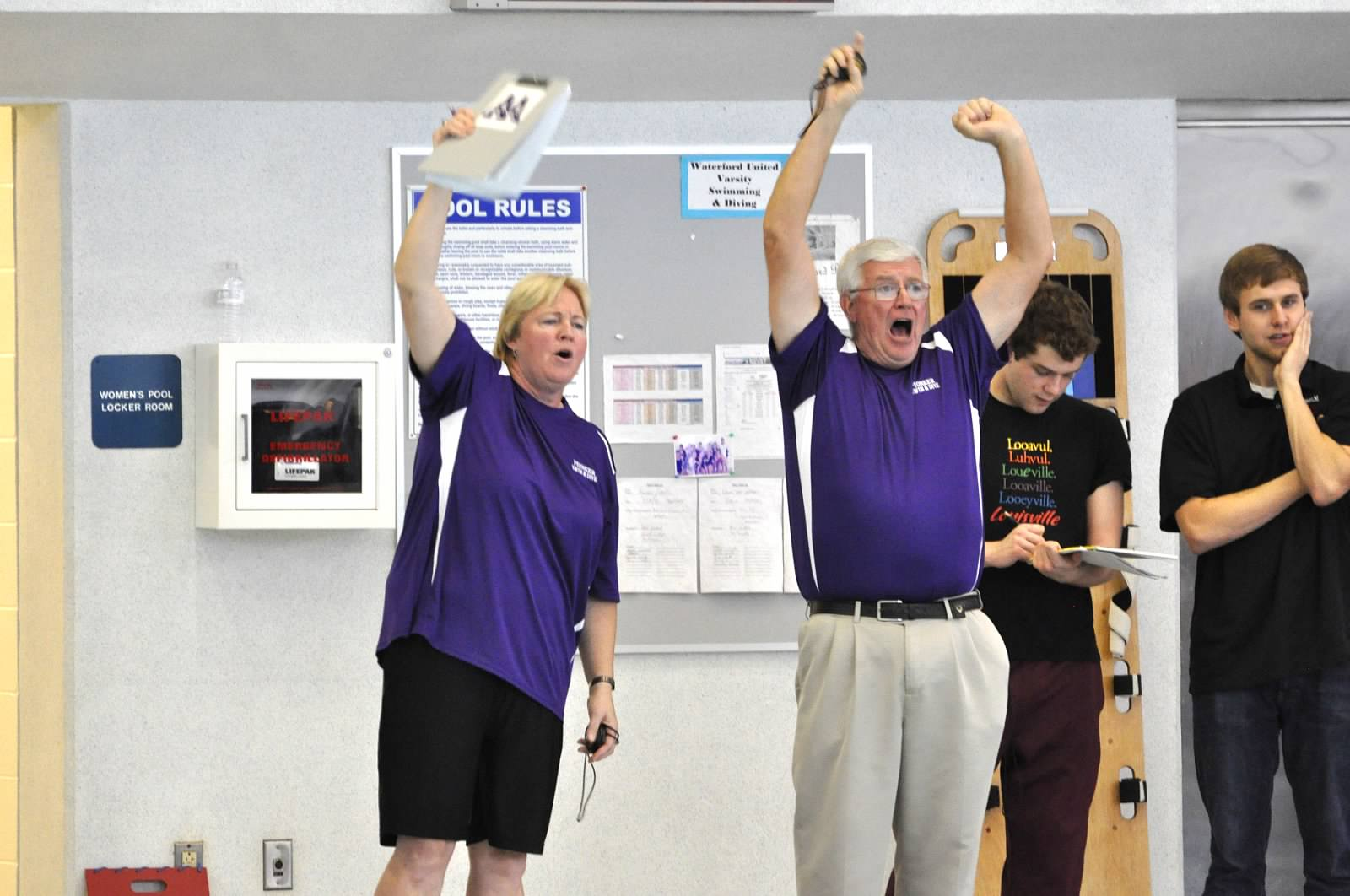
Liz and Denny Hill co-coaching from the pool deck.

In his first year at Ferndale High School in 1967, Denny Hill won 3 meets, which he attributed to most of the senior quitting since he had been their 3rd coach and was requiring them to come to practice. During his tenure as coach at Pioneer High School, the men's and women's swim teams won 31 Michigan High School State Swim Championships (15 for the men's team and 16 for the women's team). After getting married in 1983, Denny and Liz Hill became a coaching team. Liz was named assistant coach of both the men's and women's teams beginning in 1984 but became co-head coach of both teams in 2005. Between 1969 and 2014, the Pioneer Men's Swim & Dive Team won the Michigan High School State Championship in the following years: 1977, 1978, 1979, 1980, 1981, 1982, 1984, 1985, 1993, 1999, 2002, 2003, 2005, 2006, and 2009. In only 6 of those 45 years did the men's team place lower than 4th place in the state championships. Between 1973 and 2010, the Pioneer Women's Swim and Dive Team won the Michigan High School State Championship in the following years: 1979, 1985, 1987, 1989, 1990, 1991, 1992, 2000, 2001, 2002, 2003, 2004, 2005, 2006, 2007, and 2008. During these time periods, the men's and women's teams won 9 National Dual Meet (Power Points) Championships (the women's team also won 3 Mythical National Championships from Swimming World). Over the course of Denny's career at Pioneer High School, the combined dual meet record was 1011-128-2 (567-90 for the men and 444-38-2 for the women. The swim program produced 245 National Interscholastic Swim Coaches Association (NISCA) All-American Swimmers (140 men and 105 women) for a total of 862 All-American awards. These swimmers included Olympians Kara Lynn Joyce and Alison Gregorka. At Pioneer High School, Joyce set 4 national high school records in the 50 yard freestyle, 100 yard freestyle, 200 yard freestyle relay, and 400 yard freestyle relay before going on to swim at the University of Georgia. Joyce has 4 Olympic silver metals. Gregorka played water polo for Stanford University, and was a member of the US water polo team that won a silver medal at the 2008 Beijing Olympics. Denny also coached Dan Stephenson, who wrote The Underwater Window, a novel about competitive swimming. Denny Hill was named Michigan Interscholastic Swim Coaches Association Coach of the Year 31 times, Michigan High School Coaches Association Hall of Fame Inductee in 2003, NISCA Outstanding Service Award recipient in 2005, NHSACA National Coach of the Year in 1999, and a NHSACA Hall of Fame Inductee in 2008. In March 2014, Denny Hill was inducted into the NISCA Hall of Fame for swim coaches. In November 2008, Pioneer High School rededicate their pool, "Hill Pool." Denny was particularly honored that the pool naming was inclusive of both him and Liz. Both Denny and Liz Hill retired from coaching the women's team in 2010 and the men's team in 2014. In 2011, Eric Stanczyk took over as head coach of the Pioneer Women's Swim and Dive Team. Stanczyk swam at Eastern Michigan University and was the captain of the team in his senior year; he also swam with the Hills' son, Steven, at EMU. Following the Hills' retirement from the men's team in 2014, Stefanie (Liebner) Kerska took over as head coach of the Pioneer Men's Swim and Dive Team. Kerska swam for the Hills at Pioneer High School, and then went on to be a 7-time Big Ten Champion and assistant coach at the University of Michigan. While at the University of Michigan, Kerska was the first woman to be selected by CollegeSwimming.com as Assistant Coach-of-the-Year. Kerska took over as head coach of the Pioneer High School Women's Swim and Dive Team in the fall of 2015.

Denny Hill is also credited with starting Club Wolverine, the Ann Arbor-based USA Swimming club team. The program was started as a summer, long-course, swim program to provide local swimmers the opportunity to compete in summer national-level competitions. Denny's friend, Jon Urbanchek, took over the club in 1983 when Urbanchek became the head coach of the University of Michigan swim program. Although Club Wolverine is now a year-round swim club for all age groups, the club has remained the summer training program for elite swimmers from the University of Michigan and Eastern Michigan University.

== Personal life ==
Denny and Liz Hill have two children, Steven and Andrew. Steven swam in college for Eastern Michigan University. They have a golden retriever named Benny Hill.
