= David Henry Williams =

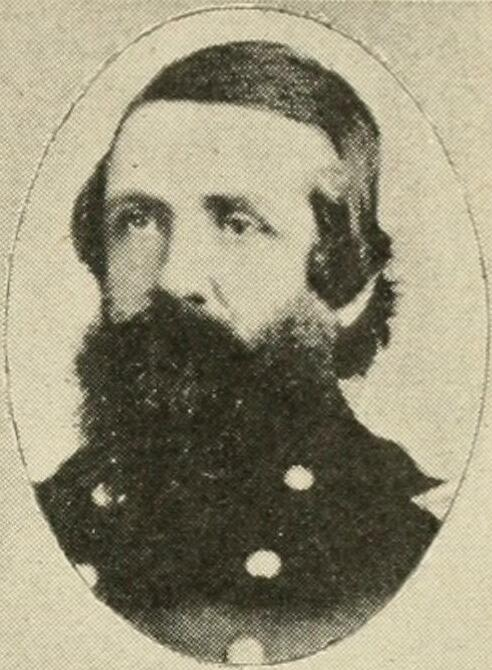
- Born: March 19, 1819; Otsego County, New York
- Died: June 1, 1891 (aged 72); Allegheny, Pennsylvania
- Burial place: Pittsburgh, Pennsylvania
- Military career
- Allegiance: United States of America
- Branch: United States Army; Union Army
- Service years: 1847–1848; 1861–1863
- Rank: Colonel; Brigadier General (unconfirmed)
- Commands: 82nd Pennsylvania Infantry Regiment
- Conflicts: Mexican–American War; American Civil War

David Henry Williams (March 19, 1819 – June 1, 1891) was a railroad surveyor, civil engineer and writer in civilian life. He was a volunteer in the United States Army during the Mexican–American War and a volunteer Union Army colonel during the American Civil War. He was appointed colonel of the 82nd Pennsylvania Infantry Regiment on July 23, 1861. He was appointed a brigadier general in the Union Army on November 29, 1862, but his appointment expired on March 4, 1863, without being confirmed by the United States Senate. His actual highest rank remained colonel. After the expiration of his appointment in 1863, Williams resigned from the Union Army and returned to his career as a civil engineer and, after his health soon declined, a writer for newspapers and magazines.

== Early life ==
David Henry Williams was born in Otsego County, New York, on March 19, 1819.

Williams moved to Detroit, Michigan in 1837. He was a railroad surveyor for 10 years.

== Mexican–American War and aftermath ==
Williams served as a volunteer in the Mexican–American War. Historian Ezra J. Warner wrote that Williams's obituary stated that he served in the Mexican-American War but he is not listed as an officer in F. B. Heitman's Historical Register. Historian Stewart Sifakis wrote that Williams served "apparently as an enlisted man."

After the Mexican-American War, Williams moved to Allegheny, Pennsylvania, now part of Pittsburgh, Pennsylvania. He practiced engineering and became interested in the militia.

== American Civil War ==
The 82nd Pennsylvania Infantry Regiment was organized as the 31st Pennsylvania Infantry Regiment and served under that designation until the Battle of Fair Oaks. Thereafter, the 2nd Reserve Regiment was given the designation 31st Pennsylvania Infantry Regiment and the original regiment was renumbered as the 82nd Pennsylvania Infantry Regiment. Williams was the first colonel of the regiment, having been appointed July 23, 1861.

Williams commanded the regiment during the Peninsula Campaign, where the unit was in action at the Siege of Yorktown and at the Seven Days Battles during which the regiment suffered heavy casualties at the Battle of Seven Pines and Battle of Malvern Hill. The regiment did not become engaged in heavy combat in the Maryland Campaign or the Battle of Fredericksburg and suffered few losses in them.

Williams was appointed a brigadier general on November 29, 1862. The appointment expired on March 4, 1863, without having been confirmed.

Warner notes that Williams's last appearance in the Official Records was January 31, 1863, when he was commander of the 82nd Pennsylvania Infantry Regiment in the division commanded by Charles Devens.

Williams resigned from the Union Army in early 1863 and returned to Allegheny (Pittsburgh).

== Later life and death ==
Williams returned to engineering after he resigned from the Union Army. Warner states that he was a professor of engineering after his return to Allegheny. After a short time, his health deteriorated and he became a prolific writer for newspapers and magazines.

David Henry Williams died on June 1, 1891, at Allegheny, Pennsylvania. He is buried at Allegheny Cemetery, Pittsburgh, Pennsylvania.
