= Nigel Sharpe =

British tennis player

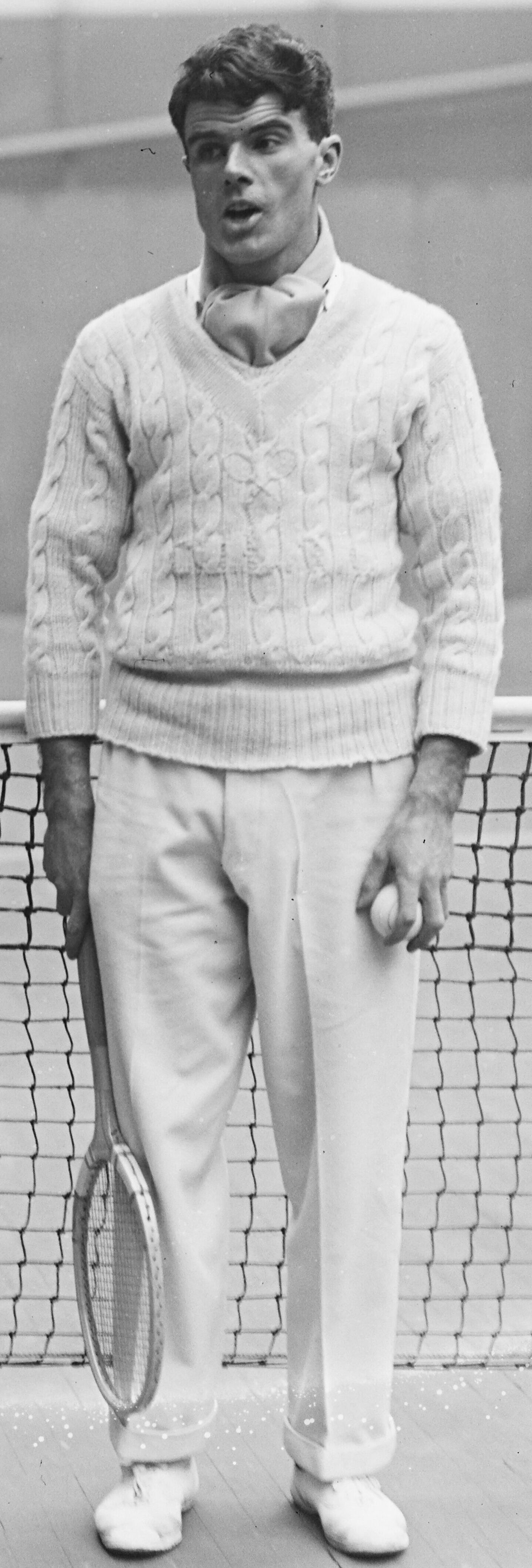
- Full name: Nigel G. Sharpe
- Country (sports): United Kingdom
- Born: 23 December 1904 London, England
- Died: 3 October 1962 (aged 57) London, England
- Turned pro: 1924 (amateur tour)
- Retired: 1939

Singles
- Career record: 133–82 (61.86%)
- Career titles: 29

Grand Slam singles results
- French Open: 3R (1928)
- Wimbledon: 4R (1929, 1931, 1935)

Nigel G. Sharpe (23 December 1904 – 3 October 1962) was a British tennis player. He was active between 1924 and 1939 and won 29 singles titles.

== Career ==
Sharpe represented the Great Britain Davis Cup team in one tie, against Poland in Torquay in 1930, called up to a side weakened by key withdrawals. The British won 5–0, with Sharpe securing wins in both of his singles matches, against Maximilian Stolarow and Ignacy Tłoczyński.

At the 1931 Wimbledon Championships, Sharpe defeated second seed Henri Cochet in the opening round. It was one of three occasions that he made the fourth round at Wimbledon.

He was particularly successful at the indoor London Covered Court Championships played on fast wood courts winning the title four times from five finals between 1928 and 1938.

His other career singles highlights include winning the Norfolk Championships three times (1931, 1935, 1936), the Bedford Open three times (1936–38). He also won the Northern Championships in 1931, the Surrey Championships in 1932, the South of England Championships in 1934, and the British Covered Court Championships in 1938.

== See also ==
- List of Great Britain Davis Cup team representatives
