= Mary McIlquham =

British tennis player

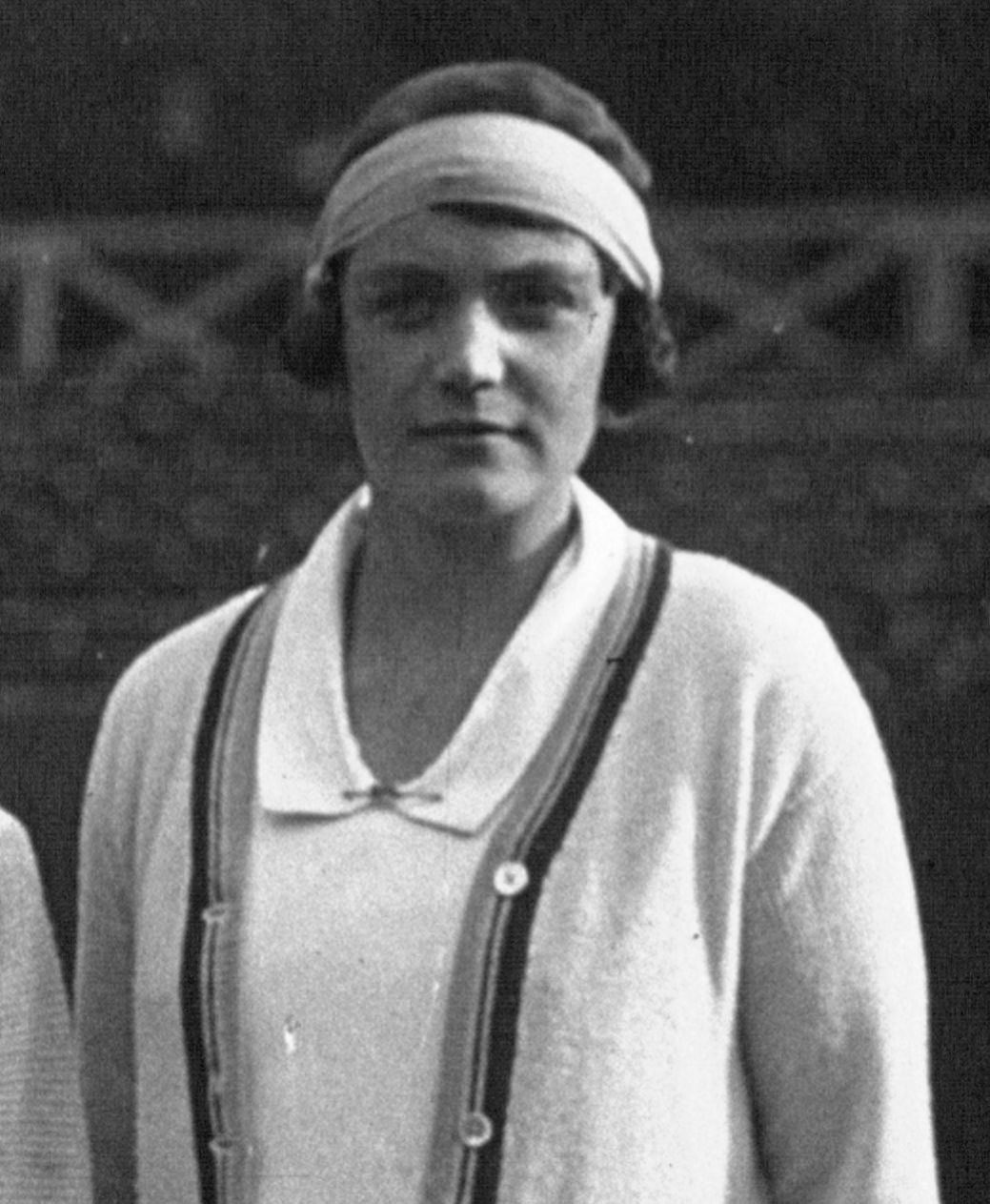
- McIlquham in 1926
- Full name: Mary Melinda McIlquham
- Country (sports): United Kingdom
- Born: 10 September 1901 Bamburgh, United Kingdom

Singles

Grand Slam singles results
- French Open: 3R (1925)
- Wimbledon: QF (1925, 1929)

Doubles

Grand Slam doubles results
- French Open: SF (1925)
- Wimbledon: F (1925)

Grand Slam mixed doubles results
- Wimbledon: QF (1929)

Mary Melinda McIlquham (née Hart, born 10 September 1901) was an English female tennis player who was active during the 1920s and early 1930s.

Between 1923 and 1931 she competed in nine Wimbledon Championships. Her best result in the singles event was reaching the quarterfinal in 1925 and 1929. In the latter year she caused an upset by defeating second-seeded Lilí Álvarez in the fourth round, who was the runner-up at the previous three editions. Her biggest success at Grand Slam level came in the doubles event where she reached the Wimbledon final in 1925 partnering Kathleen Bridge which they lost in straight sets to five-time winners Suzanne Lenglen and Elizabeth Ryan.

She was married to Clinton Gilbert McIlquham. They participated as a husband and wife couple in the Wimbledon mixed doubles event in 1923, 1925 and 1927.

== Grand Slam finals ==
=== Doubles: (1 runner-up) ===
Result	Year	Championship	Surface	Partner	Opponents	Score
Loss	1925	Wimbledon Championships	Grass	(United Kingdom) Kathleen Bridge	(France) Suzanne Lenglen (United States) Elizabeth Ryan	2–6, 2–6
