= Kathleen Lidderdale =

British hockey and tennis player

Personal information
- Nationality: British
- Born: 6 September 1894 Henley-on-Thames, Oxfordshire
- Died: 29 January 1973 (aged 78)
- Years active: 1909–1920s (hockey); 1923–1931 (tennis)

Sport
- Sport: Field hockey; Tennis

Kathleen Eleanora Lidderdale (6 September 1894 – 29 January 1973) was an English international field hockey player and tennis player.

== Personal life ==
Kathleen Lidderdale was born 6 September 1894 in Henley, Oxfordshire. Her father, James Lidderdale, was a local doctor in the Cheltenham area and a former mayor of Henley. She had four brothers and one sister. She married Captain Allman Vizer Bridge on 20 October 1924 in the Parish Church, Prestbury.

== Hockey career ==
Kathleen Lidderdale began her international hockey career in 1910 when playing for England for the first time aged 16. The previous year she began playing for her local county team, Gloucestershire. Lidderdale played at centre forward and was considered the best female player in that position at the time. A Times correspondent wrote when reporting on a match: "She was certainly the best and most finished player of either side, ard must be just as superior to any lady centre forward as S. H. Snoveller is superior to any man in that position." She was a prolific goal scorer: In 1919 she scored all nine goals against Ireland and all six against Scotland. In 1923 she was made England captain. Lidderdale also released a book in 1923 called "Hockey for Girls and Women" published by G Bell and Sons.

Kathleen's sister Margaret also played hockey for Gloucestershire.

== Tennis career ==
Lidderdale competed in seven Wimbledon women's singles tournaments between 1923 and 1931. She reached the third round of the 1923 tournament. In 1925, she came second in the women's doubles tournament with Mary McIquham; the pair lost to Suzanne Lenglen and Elizabeth Ryan.

=== Grand Slam finals ===
Doubles: (1 runner-up)

| Result | Year | Championship | Surface | Partner | Opponents | Score |
|---|---|---|---|---|---|---|
| Loss | 1925 | Wimbledon | Grass | (United Kingdom) Mary McIlquham | (France) Suzanne Lenglen (United States) Elizabeth Ryan | 2–6, 2–6 |
