= Joan Ridley =

British tennis player

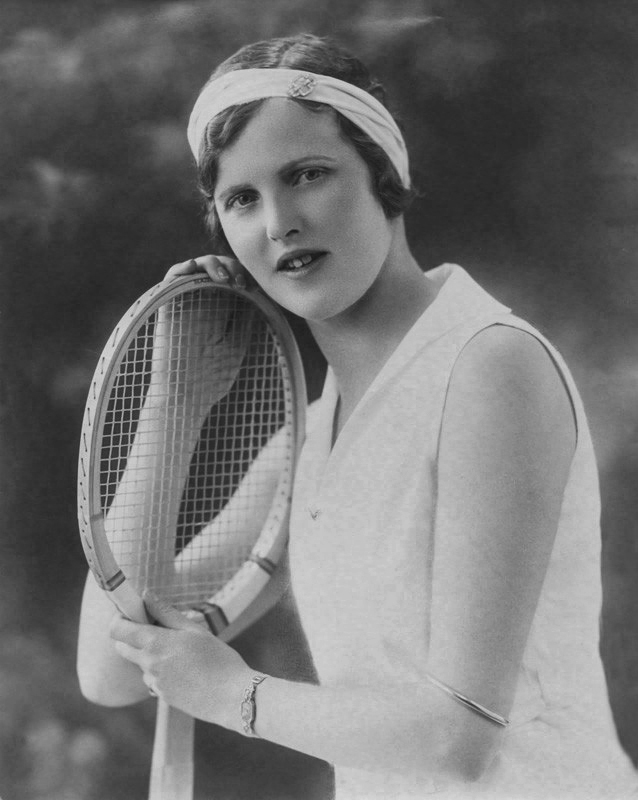
- Full name: Joan Cowell O'Meara Ridley
- Country (sports): United Kingdom
- Born: 11 July 1903 Ipswich, England
- Died: 4 October 1983 (aged 80)

Grand Slam singles results
- French Open: 3R (1929, 1931)
- Wimbledon: SF (1929)
- US Open: SF (1932)

Grand Slam doubles results
- French Open: SF (1927)
- Wimbledon: SF (1933)

Grand Slam mixed doubles results
- Wimbledon: F (1931)

Joan Cowell O'Meara Ridley (11 July 1903 – 4 October 1983) was a female British tennis player who was active in the 1920s and 1930s. Ridley was a semifinalist at the 1931 Wimbledon Championships where she lost in straight sets to Helen Jacobs.

== Career ==
In 1928 Ridley won the Scottish Championships in 1928 and successfully defended her title in 1929. The same year her best Grand Slam result was reaching the final of the mixed doubles event at the 1929 Wimbledon Championships with compatriot Ian Collins, losing in three sets to the Americans Anna Harper and George Lott.

In 1930 she won the singles title at the British Covered Court Championships, played at the Queen's Club in London, after defeating Joan Fry in the final in straight sets. In 1929, she was runner-up at the same event to Peggy Saunders Michell. With Stanley Doust, she won the mixed doubles covered court title in 1926.

In 1932, she reached the semifinals at the U.S. Championships, losing in three sets to Carolin Babcock. In October 1932 and 1933, she won the tennis tournament in White Sulphur Springs, West Virginia. In 1931 and 1932 she reached the finals of the Middle States Championships, but lost on both occasions to Elsie Goldsack Pittman. In 1933 after two unsuccessful attempts she won the Middle States Championships against Alice Francis.

In October 1935, she married Daniel Joseph Patrick O'Meara, a gynaecologist. Her forehand was her favourite stroke.

== Grand Slam finals ==
=== Mixed doubles: 1 runner-up ===
Result	Year	Championship	Surface	Partner	Opponents	Score
Loss	1931	Wimbledon	Grass	(United Kingdom) Ian Collins	(United States) Anna Harper (United States) George Lott	3–6, 6–1, 1–6
