= Gwen Sterry =

English tennis player

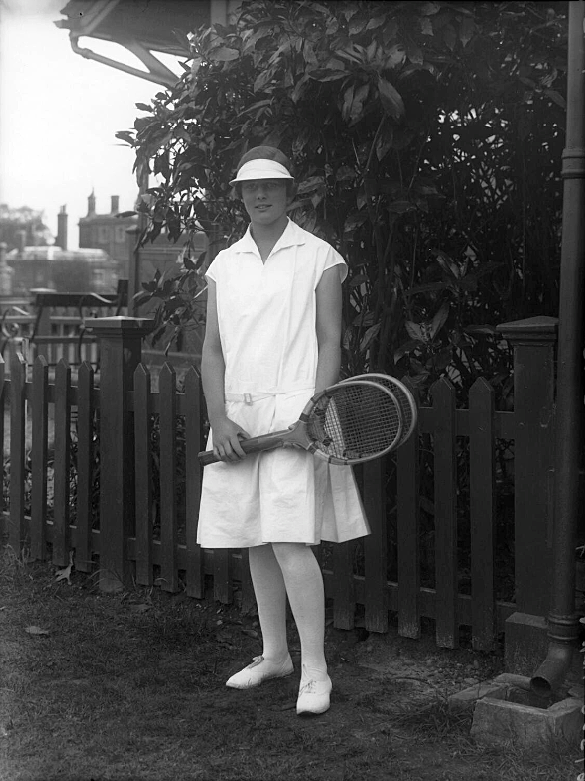
- Sterry in 1926
- Full name: Gwen Reingale Sterry Simmers
- Country (sports): United Kingdom
- Born: 1905 Surrey, England

Singles

Grand Slam singles results
- Wimbledon: 4R (1931)
- US Open: 3R (1927)

Doubles

Grand Slam doubles results
- Wimbledon: QF (1925, 1929)
- US Open: SF (1927)

Grand Slam mixed doubles results
- Wimbledon: 3R (1926, 1931)

Team competitions
- Wightman Cup: F (1927)

Gwendolyne Reingale Sterry Simmers (1905–1987) was an English tennis player who was active in the 1920s and 1930s.

In 1922 she won the Junior Singles British Championship.

She competed eight times in the singles event at Wimbledon, reaching the fourth round in 1931 which she lost to fourth-seeded Hilde Krahwinkel. Sterry lost in three sets to Helen Wills during the first round of the 1927 Wimbledon Championships and is one of only three players who were able to win a set against Wills during her eight-year reign as Wimbledon champion.

She won the doubles title at the 1926 British Hard Court Championships in Torquay partnering Betty Nuthall. With Kitty McKane Godfree she was runner-up in the doubles event in 1932 when the tournament was held in Bournemouth. That same year she won the singles title at the Surrey Championships. Sterry was part of the British team that lost the Wightman Cup in 1927 to the United States but won her doubles match partnering Betty Hill.

== Personal life ==
Sterry was the daughter of five-time Wimbledon champion Charlotte Cooper. She married the Scottish rugby international William Simmers on 9 July 1932 at St Mark's Church, Surbiton. She died in 1987, aged 82. Her death was registered in Helensburgh, Scotland.
