= Peggy Michell =

British tennis player

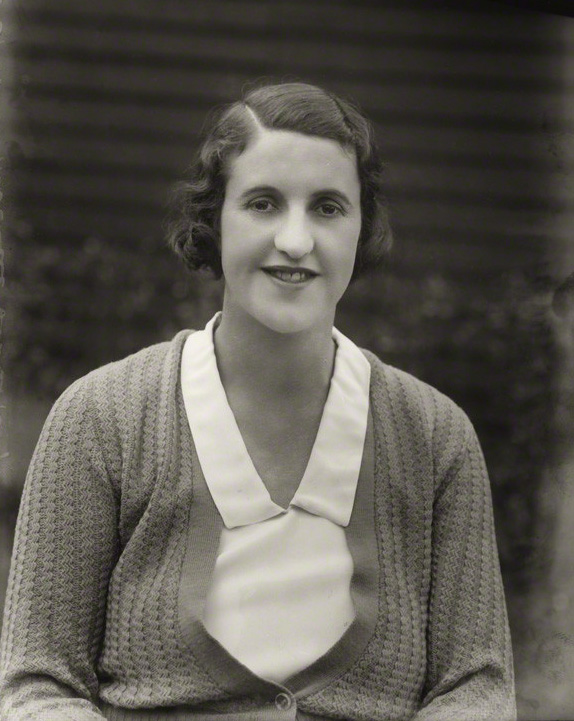
- Full name: Margaret Amy Saunders Michell
- Country (sports): United Kingdom
- Born: 28 January 1905 Chiswick, England
- Died: 19 June 1941 (aged 36) Harrow, England

Singles

Grand Slam singles results
- Wimbledon: 4R (1929)
- US Open: QF (1929)

Doubles

Grand Slam doubles results
- French Open: F (1927)
- Wimbledon: W (1928, 1929)
- US Open: W (1929)

Grand Slam mixed doubles results
- Wimbledon: 3R (1927, 1929, 1931)

Team competitions
- Wightman Cup: W (1928, 1929, 1932)

Margaret Amy Michell (née Saunders; 28 January 1905 – 19 June 1941) was a British female tennis player active in the 1920s. She is also known under her married name, Peggy Saunders-Michell.

She was educated at St Paul's Girls' School in London.

Along with Phoebe Holcroft, she won two consecutive women's doubles titles at Wimbledon (1928 and 1929) and the US Women's National Championship in 1929. With the same partner, she reached the final at the French Championships in 1927 in which they were defeated by Irene Bowder Peacock and Bobbie Heine.

Her best singles results at a Grand Slam tournament came in 1929 when she reached the fourth round at Wimbledon and the quarterfinals at the U.S. Championships where she lost to Elsie Goldsack and Helen Wills respectively. Michell competed in nine Wimbledon editions between 1925 and 1938.

She won the singles title at the British Covered Court Championships, played on wood courts at the Queen's Club in London, in 1926 and 1929. Ath the same event she also won the doubles title from 1929 to 1933, with four different partners, and the mixed doubles in 1928 and 1928.

Michell was part of the British Wightman Cup team in 1928, 1929 and 1932 and won the cup against the United States in 1928.

== Grand Slam finals ==
=== Doubles (3 titles, 1 runner-up) ===
Result	Year	Championship	Surface	Partner	Opponents	Score
Loss	1927	French Championships	Clay	(United Kingdom) Phoebe Watson	(South Africa) Irene Bowder Peacock (South Africa) Bobbie Heine	2–6, 1–6
Win	1928	Wimbledon	Grass	(United Kingdom) Phoebe Watson	(United Kingdom) Ermyntrude Harvey (United Kingdom) Eileen Bennett	6–2, 6–3
Win	1929	Wimbledon	Grass	(United Kingdom) Phoebe Watson	(United Kingdom) Phyllis Covell (United Kingdom) Dorothy Shepherd	6–4, 8–6
Win	1929	U.S. National Championships	Grass	(United Kingdom) Phoebe Watson	(United Kingdom) Phyllis Covell (United Kingdom) Dorothy Shepherd	2–6, 6–3, 6–4
