= Ermyntrude Harvey =

British tennis player (1895–1973)

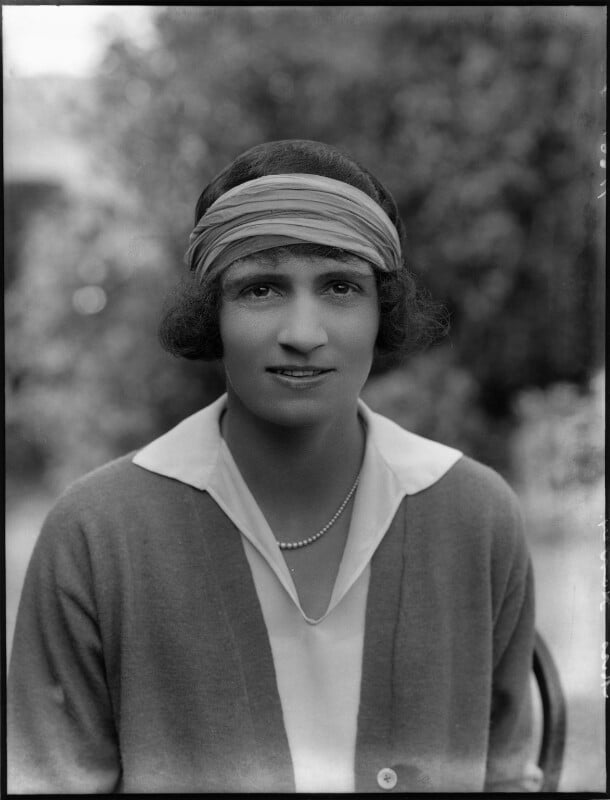
- Harvey in 1929
- Full name: Ermyntrude Hilda Harvey
- Country (sports): United Kingdom
- Born: 9 June 1895 London, England
- Died: 4 October 1973 (aged 78) Weybridge England

Singles
- Career record: 634–30 (73.4%)
- Career titles: 45

Grand Slam singles results
- French Open: 3R (1925)
- Wimbledon: 4R (1927, 1928)

Doubles

Grand Slam doubles results
- French Open: SF (1925, 1930)
- Wimbledon: F (1928)
- US Open: W (1927)

Grand Slam mixed doubles results
- Wimbledon: QF (1924, 1926, 1939)
- US Open: F (1925)

Team competitions
- Wightman Cup: W (1925, 1930)

Ermyntrude Hilda Harvey (9 June 1895 – 4 October 1973) was a British female tennis player of the 1920s and 1930s. Between 1919 and 1938 she won 45 career singles titles on grass, clay and indoor wood courts.

== Career ==
Between 1920 and 1948 she participated in 22 editions of the Wimbledon Championships. Her best results in the singles event were reaching the fourth round in both 1927 (lost to Elizabeth Ryan 7–5, 6–1) and 1928 (lost to first-seeded and eventual champion Helen Wills 6–2, 6–3).

At the 1927 U.S. National Championships, she partnered with Kathleen McKane Godfree to win the women's doubles title. The following year, Eileen Bennett and she were the women's doubles runners-up at Wimbledon.

She also was the runner-up with Vincent Richards in mixed doubles at the 1925 U.S. National Championships.

Her other career singles highlights included winning the Dovercourt Clay Courts at Dovercourt, Essex (1923), the East of England Championships, at Felixstowe, Suffolk (1924), London Hard Court Championships, at the Hurlingham Club (1924), the South of England Championships (1924), the Suffolk Championships at Saxmundham three times (1924, 1926, 1928), the Roehampton "Autumn Hard Court Tournament" on clay (1926), Frinton-on-Sea (1928), the Middlesex Championships at Chiswick (1928), the Sidmouth Grass Courts four times (1928, 1930, 1932–33), the Surrey Covered Court Championships at Dulwich (1929), the Worthing Clay Courts at Worthing (1929), the Gleneagles Hard Courts Championship (1929), the East Grinstead Open three times (1935–36, 1938).

In addition she also won the Winchester Lawn Tennis Tournament three times (1930–31, 1933), the Teignmouth and Shaldon tournament at Teignmouth (1931), the Exmouth Open four times (1930, 1932–33, 1935), the North London Hard Courts Championships, Highbury (1932), the Bude Grass Courts (1933) at Bude, Cornwall, the Tunbridge Wells Grass Courts (1933), the Seaton Tournament, Seaton, Devon (1934), the London Covered Court Championships on indoor wood courts (1934) defeating Eileen Bennett Whittingstall, the Cinque Ports Championships (1935) at Folkestone, Kent, the Felixstowe Clay Courts two times (1931–32), and the Hampstead Hard Court Tournament (1932).

She was a singles finalist at the St.George's Hill Open (1924), the Surrey Hard Court Championships at Roehampton losing to Eileen Bennett (1926), the West Kensington Hard Court Tournament (1928) losing to Elizabeth Ryan, the British Covered Court Championships (1935) losing to Peggy Scriven. She was also part of the British team that won the Wightman Cup in 1925 and 1930.

== Grand Slam finals ==
=== Doubles: 2 (1 title, 1 runners-up) ===
| Result | Year | Championship | Surface | Partner | Opponents | Score |
|---|---|---|---|---|---|---|
| Win | 1927 | U.S. National Championships | Grass | (United Kingdom) Kathleen McKane Godfree | (United Kingdom) Betty Nuthall (United Kingdom) Joan Fry | 6–1, 4–6, 6–4 |
| Loss | 1928 | Wimbledon Championships | Grass | (United Kingdom) Eileen Bennett | (United Kingdom) Peggy Michell (United Kingdom) Phoebe Holcroft Watson | 2–6, 3–6 |

=== Mixed doubles: 1 (1 runners-up) ===
| Result | Year | Championship | Surface | Partner | Opponents | Score |
|---|---|---|---|---|---|---|
| Loss | 1925 | U.S. National Championships | Grass | (United States) Vincent Richards | (United Kingdom) Kathleen McKane Godfree (Australia) John Hawkes | 2–6, 4–6 |
