= Joan Fry =

British tennis player (1906–1985)

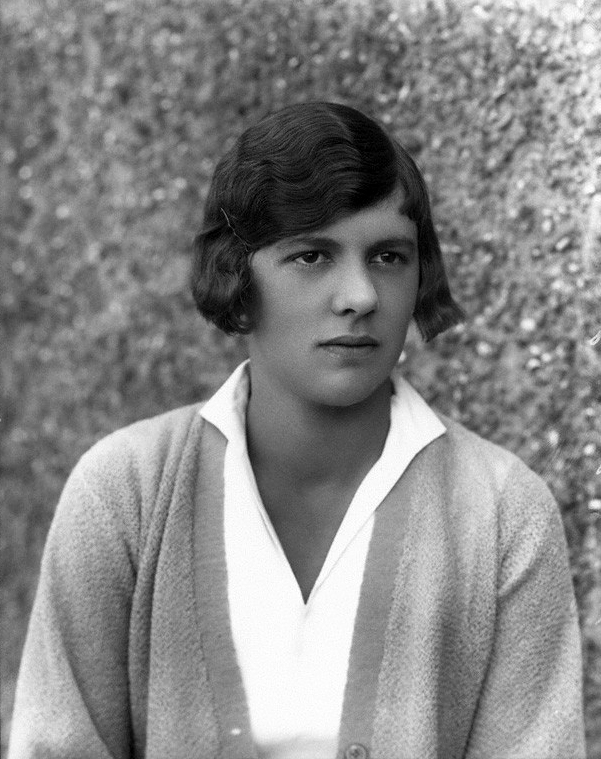
- Joan Fry pictured on 21 May 1929
- Full name: Joan Craddock Fry-Lakeman
- Country (sports): United Kingdom
- Born: 6 May 1906
- Died: 29 September 1985 (aged 79)

Grand Slam singles results
- French Open: SF (1926)
- Wimbledon: F (1925)
- US Open: QF (1925)

Grand Slam doubles results
- French Open: SF (1926, 1928, 1930)
- US Open: F (1927)

Grand Slam mixed doubles results
- French Open: 3R (1930)
- Wimbledon: F (1929)

Team competitions
- Wightman Cup: 1930

Joan Craddock Fry (6 May 1906 – 29 September 1985) was a British tennis player. Fry was a finalist at the 1925 Wimbledon Championships where she lost in straight sets to Suzanne Lenglen.

She was part of the British team that won the 1930 Wightman Cup against the United States. She lost her singles matches to Helen Wills and Helen Jacobs but together with Ermyntrude Harvey won the doubles match against Sarah Palfrey and Edith Cross.

In 1930 she was a finalist at the British Covered Court Championships, played at the Queen's Club in London.

On 12 November 1930 she married Thomas Ashley Lakeman, a lieutenant in the Royal Tank Corps.

== Grand Slam finals ==
=== Singles: 1 runner-up ===
Result	Year	Championship	Surface	Opponent	Score
Loss	1925	Wimbledon	Grass	(France) Suzanne Lenglen	2–6, 0–6

=== Doubles: 1 runner-up ===
Result	Year	Championship	Surface	Partner	Opponents	Score
Loss	1927	U.S. Championships	Grass	(United Kingdom) Betty Nuthall	(United Kingdom) Ermyntrude Harvey (United Kingdom) Kitty Mckane	1–6, 6–4, 4–6

=== Mixed doubles: 1 runner-up ===
Result	Year	Championship	Surface	Partner	Opponents	Score
Loss	1929	Wimbledon	Grass	(United Kingdom) Ian Collins	(United States) Helen Wills (United States) Francis Hunter	1–6, 4–6
