= 1929 ILTF men's and women's tennis circuit =

1929 men's and women's ILTF tennis circuit
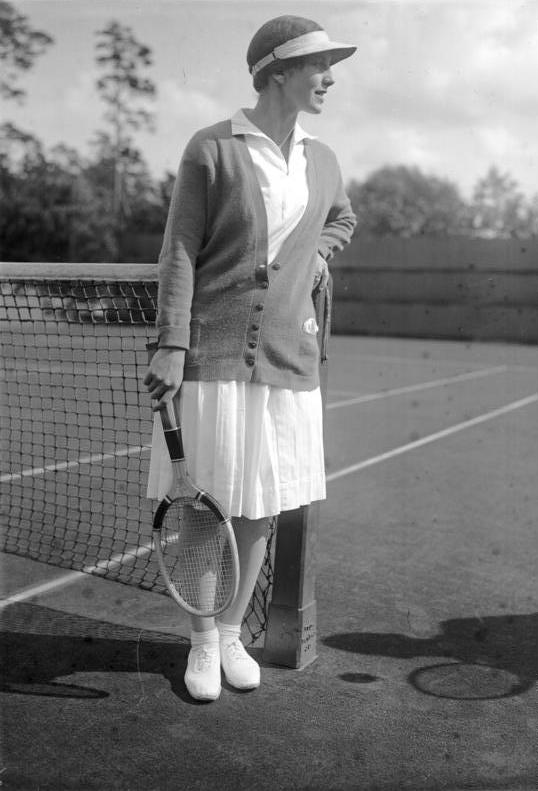
- Helen Wills Moody in 1929

Details
- Duration: January 1 – December 22
- Categories: Pro Majors (2); National championships (16); International championships (86); Team events (11); Pro Tour (4)

Achievements (singles)
- Most titles: (France) Henri Cochet (10)

The year 1929 in tennis was a complex mixture of mainly amateur tournaments composed of international, invitational, national, exhibition, and team (city leagues, country leagues, international knock-out tournaments) events and joined by regional professional tournaments limited mostly to British, German, French and American Pro events.

The professionals were mostly coaches who coached for a living, while amateur rules prohibited tennis players to benefit financially from playing. There were a few occasional professional against amateur challenges as well held in team competition format. The amateur events were almost all all-comers' event and the majority included a mixed title contest. The women's most successful players in the European international championships were Esna Boyd of Australia and two players from the United States Elizabeth Ryan who was thuspunished by the United States Lawn Tennis Association for her commitment to European events compared to those in the U.S. and Helen Wills Moody who won the two most prestigious tournaments in Europe, the French Championships and Wimbledon. The Four Musketeers dominated the rankings and tournaments worldwide. Also the Australian Championships was won by a British player, Colin Gregory.

The most important team cups were the Wightman Cup for women and the Davis Cup (called the International Lawn Tennis Challenge) and the Mitre Cup (South American version of the Davis Cup) for men. The 1929 Wightman Cup was its seventh edition and was organized by the United States Lawn Tennis Association between the teams of Great Britain and the United States. The 1929 International Lawn Tennis Challenge was its 24th edition and was organized by the International Tennis Federation. The tournament was split into the American and European zones. The winner of each sub-zone played in an Inter-Zonal Final. 24 teams entered the Europe Zone (including South Africa and Chile), while five nations participated in the America Zone. The United States defeated Cuba in the America Zone, but would then lose to France in the challenge round, giving France their third straight title. The final was played at Stade Roland Garros in Paris, France, on July 26–28.

== Key ==
Pro Majors
National championships
International championships
Team events
Pro tour

This list includes men and women international tournaments (where at least several different nations were represented), main (annual) national championships, professional tour events and the Davis, Mitre, Wightman Cup.

== January ==
- German Davis Cup player Georg Demasius turned professional.
- Retired Wimbledon champion Wilfred Baddeley died in Menton.

Month	Event	Men		Women		Mixed	
Month	Event	Champions	Runner-up	Champions	Runner-up	Champions	Runner-up
December -31	Cannes L.T.C. tournament Cannes, France	(Italy) Giorgio de Stefani; 12-10, 9–7, 2–6, 6–0	(France) Benny Berthet	(France) Sylvia Lafaurie; 6–1, 4–6, 6–4	Taunay		
December -31	Cannes L.T.C. tournament Cannes, France	Scovel / (Italy) de Stefani; 1–6, 6–4, 7–5, 7–5	(Switzerland) Aeschlimann / (Argentina) Magrane	Not known	Not known	(Switzerland) Aeschlimann / (France) Lafaurie; 6–4, 6–4	Taunay / Scovel
December 31 – 8 January	Métropole Club de Cannes Beausite; Cannes, France	(Italy) Umberto de Morpurgo; 6–3, 1–6, 6–4, 6–1	(Italy) Giorgio de Stefani	(Australia) Esna Boyd; 6–2, 6–2	(United Kingdom) Phyllis Satterthwaite		
December 31 – 8 January	Métropole Club de Cannes Beausite; Cannes, France	(Italy) Morpurgo / (United Kingdom) Hillyard; 4–6, 6–2, 6–3, 6–4	(Italy) de Stefani / (Switzerland) Aeschlimann	(Australia) Boyd / (United Kingdom) Satterthwaite; 6–4, 5–7, 6–2	(Switzerland) Payot / Anthony	(Italy) Morpurgo / (United Kingdom) Satterthwaite vs. (Austria) Matejka / (Australia) Boyd; 1–6, 6–3, 6–6 suspended	
Early January	New Courts L.T.C. of Hyères; Hyères, France	(France) Jacques Brugnon; 5–7, 4–6, 8–6, 6–4, 6–2	(Austria) Franz Wilhelm Matejka	(Australia) Esna Boyd; 8–6, ret.	(United Kingdom) Phyllis Satterthwaite		
Early January	New Courts L.T.C. of Hyères; Hyères, France	(Austria) Matejka / (Italy) Morpurgo; 6–2, 6–4, 8–6	(France) Brugnon / (United Kingdom) Hillyard	(United Kingdom) Satterthwaite / (Australia) Boyd; 7–5, 6–1	Martin / (Switzerland) Payot	(Italy) Morpurgo / (Australia) Boyd; 10-8, 6–4	(France) Brugnon / (United Kingdom) Satterthwaite
January -2	Coupe de Noël; Paris, France	(France) Henri Cochet; 6–3, 6–4, 6–3	(France) Jean Borotra	(France) Germaine Golding; 6–1, 8-10, 9–7	(France) Marguerite Bordes		
January -2	Coupe de Noël; Paris, France	(France) Cochet / (France) de Buzelet; 4–6, 6–3, 6–2, 7–5	(France) J Borotra / (France) É Borotra	(France) Desloges / (France) Conquet; 9–7, 6–0	(France) Adamoff / (France) Amaury	(France) Borotra / (France) Vlasto; 8–6, 7–5	(France) de Buzelet / (France) Desloges
January -10	New Zealand Lawn Tennis Championships 1928-1929; Christchurch, New Zealand	(New Zealand) Edgar Bartleet	(New Zealand) Cam Malfroy	(New Zealand) Marjorie MacFarlane; Not known	(New Zealand) May Speirs		
January -10	New Zealand Lawn Tennis Championships 1928-1929; Christchurch, New Zealand	(New Zealand) Bartleet / (New Zealand) Laurenson; Not known	(New Zealand) Malfroy / (New Zealand) France	(New Zealand) M Spiers / (New Zealand) M Wake	Not known	(New Zealand) M Speirs / (New Zealand) C Angas	Not known
January 9–12	Bristol Cup; Beaulieu-sur-Mer, France	(Czechoslovakia) Karel Koželuh; 6–3, 6–1, 6–0	(Republic of Ireland) Albert Burke				
12–15 January; 9 February (doubles)	Rheims Covered Courts tournament Rheims, France; Paris (doubles)	(France) Henri Cochet; 6–4, 2–6, 6–3, 6–2	(France) Christian Boussus	(France) Violette Gallay; 7–5, 6–1	(France) Arlette Neufeld		
12–15 January; 9 February (doubles)	Rheims Covered Courts tournament Rheims, France; Paris (doubles)	(France) Lesueur / (France) Pillois; 8–6, 6–1	(France) George / (France) Thurneyssen				
January 19–28	Australian Championships; Adelaide, Australia; Men's singles – Women's singles	(United Kingdom) Colin Gregory; 6–2, 6–2, 5–7, 7–5	(Australia) Richard Schlesinger	(Australia) Daphne Akhurst Cozens; 6–1, 5–7, 6–2	(Australia) Louise Bickerton		
January 19–28	Australian Championships; Adelaide, Australia; Men's singles – Women's singles	(Australia) Crawford / (Australia) Hopman; 6–1, 6–8, 4–6, 6–1, 6–3	(United Kingdom) Gregory / (United Kingdom) Collins	(Australia) Akhurst / (Australia) Bickerton; 6–2, 3–6, 6–2	(Australia) Harper / (Australia) O'Hara Wood	(Australia) Moon / Akhurst; 11-9, 3–6, 6–3	(Australia) Crawford / (Australia) Crawford
January 19–28	French Covered Courts tournament Paris, France	(France) Jean Borotra; 6–2, 6–2, 6–4	(France) Roger George	(France) Yvonne Kleinadel; 6–4, 6–1	(France) Germaine Golding		
January 19–28	French Covered Courts tournament Paris, France	(France) J Borotra / (France) É Borotra w/o	(France) Boussus / (France) de Buzelet	(France) Barbier / (France) Conquet; 7–5, 6–0	(France) Neufeld / (France) Adamoff	(France) J Borotra / (France) Bordes; 6–4, 4–6, 6–4	(France) Boussus / (France) Gallay
January 19-	Monte Carlo Country Club; Monte Carlo, Monaco	(Italy) Umberto de Morpurgo; 6–2, 6–2, 6–2	(France) Jacques Brugnon	(Australia) Esna Boyd; 7–5, 6–3	(United Kingdom) Phyllis Satterthwaite		
January 19-	Monte Carlo Country Club; Monte Carlo, Monaco	(France) Brugnon / (France) Gentien; 6–3, 5–7, 6–2, 4–6, 8–6	(Italy) Morpurgo / (United Kingdom) Hillyard	(Australia) Boyd / (United Kingdom) Satterthwaite; 2–6, 6–1, 6–4	(United Kingdom) Thomas / (United Kingdom) Covell	(Switzerland) Aeschlimann / (Australia) Boyd; 1–6, 6–3, 6–1	(France) Brugnon / (United Kingdom) Satterthwaite
January 19-	Belgian International Covered Courts tournament Brussels, Belgium	(France) Jean Borotra; 7–5, 6–4, 3–6, 6–3	(France) Henri Cochet	(France) Marguerite Broquedis; 9–7, 6–4	(Belgium) Josane Sigart		
January 19-	Belgian International Covered Courts tournament Brussels, Belgium	(France) Thurneyssen / (France) Landry; 6–0, 7–5, 6–4	(Belgium) Ewbank / (France) George	(France) Barbier / (France) Rosambert; 6–8, 6–4, 7–5	(Belgium) J Sigart / (Belgium) Y Sigart	(France) George / (France) Rosambert; 6–3, 9–7, 6–2	(France) Thurneyssen / (France) Barbier
January -27	Canadian Covered Court Tournament; Montreal, Quebec, Canada	(United States) Gilbert Hall; Not known	(Canada) Willard Crocker				
January -27	Canadian Covered Court Tournament; Montreal, Quebec, Canada	(Canada) Crocker / (Canada) Rainville; 9-5, 3–6, 0–6, 8–6, 6–4	(United States) Aydelotte / (United States) Cutler				
January -31	New Courts de Cannes Championship; Cannes, France	(Italy) Umberto de Morpurgo; 6–3, 6–4, 6–2	(France) Jacques Brugnon	(France) Sylvia Lafaurie vs. (Australia) Esna Boyd prize divided			
January -31	New Courts de Cannes Championship; Cannes, France	all doubles remained unfinished due to rain, prizes divided between participants					

== February ==
- The Davis Cup draw was held on 5th inst. in Paris. Gaston Doumergue were asked to select for the drawing of lots.
- The Sporting Club de Paris beat the Tennis Club de Paris 26 to 10 in an interclub meeting.
- Great Britain beat West Australia nine to one.
- Bill Tilden's amateur status, which was suspended from last November was requalified by the USTLA in Boston. His US number one ranking was also due to be regiven to him. He was scheduled to sail to Europe on 8 May alongside Francis Hunter to register for the Wimbledon and French Championships. However, it was also announced that none of them would be a part of the American Davis Cup team for its upcoming matches.

Month	Event	Men		Women		Mixed	
Month	Event	Champions	Runner-up	Champions	Runner-up	Champions	Runner-up
Early February	All-India national championships Allahabad, India	Not known	Not known	(British Raj) Jenny Sandison	Not known		
Early February	All-India national championships Allahabad, India	Not known	Not known	(British Raj) Jenny Sandison / Not known	Not known	(British Raj) Bobb / (British Raj) McKenna	Not known
February -7	Gallia L.T.C. de Cannes Championship; Cannes, France	(France) Henri Cochet; 7–5, 6–4, 5–7, 2–6, 9–7	(Italy) Umberto de Morpurgo	(Australia) Esna Boyd; 6–1, 6–1	(United Kingdom) Muriel Thomas		
February -7	Gallia L.T.C. de Cannes Championship; Cannes, France	All doubles remained unfinished due to rain					
February -12	Flanders International Championship; Belgium	(France) Christian Boussus; 7–5, 6–4, 6–4	(France) Henri Cochet	(France) Simone Barbier; 6–2, 6–2	Engelbert		
February -12	Flanders International Championship; Belgium	(France) J Borotra / (France) É Borotra; 6–4, 6–4, 7–5	(France) Cochet / (France) Joba	Not known	Not known	(France) George / (France) Barbier; 6–0, 6–1	(France) Boussus / Chauveau
February -14	Carlton L.T.C. de Cannes Championship; Cannes, France	(Italy) Umberto de Morpurgo; 6–4, 6–2, 6–4	(Italy) Giorgio de Stefani	(United Kingdom) Eileen Bennett; 6–4, 5–7, 6–4	(Australia) Esna Boyd		
February -14	Carlton L.T.C. de Cannes Championship; Cannes, France	(South Africa) Spence / (Switzerland) Aeschlimann; 6–1, 6–4, 6–3	(Denmark) Worm / (Monaco) Gallepe	(Australia) Boyd / (United Kingdom) Nuthall; 6–1, 6–3	(United Kingdom) Fry / (United Kingdom) Covell	(Italy) de Morpurgo / (France) Vlasto; 6–3, 6–0	(Switzerland) Aeschlimann / (United Kingdom) Covell
Mid-February	Brooklyn Heights Casino Invitational Covered Courts; New York, United States	(United States) John van Ryn; 6–1, 6–4, 6–2	(United States) Bill Tilden				
Mid-February	Brooklyn Heights Casino Invitational Covered Courts; New York, United States	(United States) van Ryn / (United States) Hall; 6–2, 9–7, 4–6, 7–5	(United States) Tilden / (United States) Hunter				
February 4–10	German Covered Courts Championships; Bremen, Weimar Republic	(Denmark) Axel Petersen; 7–5, 7–5, 6–0	(Weimar Republic) Walter Dessart	(Weimar Republic) Irmgard Rost; 11-9, 6–2, 7–5	(Weimar Republic) Ilse Friedleben		
February 4–10	German Covered Courts Championships; Bremen, Weimar Republic	(Austria) Matejka / (Weimar Republic) Moldenhauer	Not known	Kallmeyer / Hoffmann	Not known	(Austria) Matejka / (Weimar Republic) Rost	Not known
February -26	Hotel Bristol Championships; Beaulieu-sur-Mer, France	(Italy) Umberto de Morpurgo; 8-10, 6–2, 6–3, 7–5	(Italy) Giorgio de Stefani	(United Kingdom) Betty Nuthall; 6–2, 6–1	(United Kingdom) Joan Fry		
February -26	Hotel Bristol Championships; Beaulieu-sur-Mer, France	(Italy) de Morpurgo / (Italy) Del Bono; 6–3, 6–1, 6–4	(Czechoslovakia) Jan Kozeluh / (United Kingdom) Hillyard	(United Kingdom) Bennett / (United Kingdom) Fry; 6–3, 2–6, 6–2	(United Kingdom) Covell / (United Kingdom) Nuthall	(South Africa) Spence / (United Kingdom) Nuthall; 6–3, 3–6, 6–3	(Hungary) von Kehrling / (United Kingdom) Covell
February -28	St. Moritz Covered Courts Championship; St. Moritz, Switzerland	(France) Roger George; 6–1, 6–2	(Monaco) Vladimir Landau	(France) Yvonne Kleinadel; 7–5, 6–1	(Switzerland) Lolette Payot		
February -28	St. Moritz Covered Courts Championship; St. Moritz, Switzerland	(France) George / Oppenheimer; 6–3, 6–3, 6–3	(Belgium) Ewbank / (Belgium) Lacroix	Not known	Not known	(France) George / (France) Culbert; 5–7, 6–3, 6–2	Oppenheimer / (Weimar Republic) Friedleben

== March ==
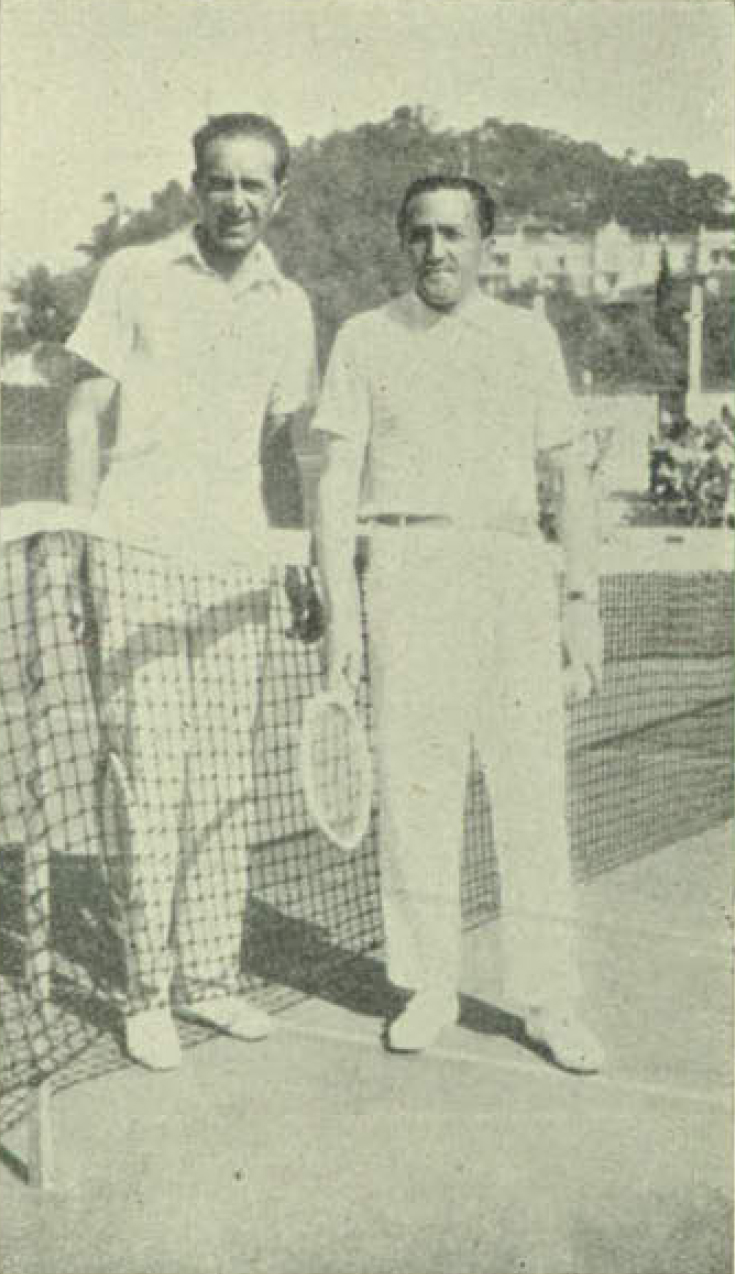
Erik Worm and Béla von Kehrling in San Remo

- In the Bordighera ladies' final Lucia Valerio and Phyllis Satterthwaite played a 425-stroke point setting up a world record, which stood for 55 years.^{[d]}
- Jean Borotra was awarded permanently the US national indoors trophy after he won the tournament three consecutive times.
- Georges Glasser and André Martin-Legeay were promoted to the premier amateur tour by the Fédération Française de Tennis after both players reached the final of the French Criterium Tournament, a B category trials competition. They were allowed to enter first -class international tournaments onwards.
- Paul Féret returned to playing this month after his requalification back from professional status.
- Italian champion Lucia Valerio won her first titles in Menton (mixed doubles) and in Sanremo in singles.
- American Wallace F. Johnson turned professional and became the trainer of the University of Pennsylvania.
- The Romanian tennis authority split into two factions. All the clubs left the Federation of Sportive Societies in Romania and formed a Union of lawn tennis clubs headed by prominent Davis Club players such as Nicolae Mişu and László Dörner. It still remained an open question whether it'd be recognized by the ILTF.
- The following rule changes were adapted by the ILTF:
  - "The Server shall not by the following movements of his feet be deemed "to change his position by walking or running:
    - Slight movements of the feet which do not materially affect the location originally taken up by him.
    - An unrestricted movement of one foot so long as the other foot maintains continuously its original contact with the ground.
  - At no time during the delivery of the service (i.e. from the taking up of the stance to the moment of impact of the racket and the ball) may both feet be off the ground simultaneously.
  - The word "feet" means the extremities of the legs below the ankles and at all times during the delivery of the service (as before described) every part of such extremities must be behind (i.e. further from the net than) the base line."

Month	Event	Men		Women		Mixed	
Month	Event	Champions	Runner-up	Champions	Runner-up	Champions	Runner-up
March -4	New South Wales Championships; Sydney, Australia	(Australia) Jack Crawford; 6–4, 6–3, 6–3	(Australia) Clifford Sproule	(Australia) Daphne Akhurst; 6–3, 6–3	(Australia) Kathrine Le Mesurier		
March -4	New South Wales Championships; Sydney, Australia	(Australia) Crawford / (Australia) Hopman; 6–3, 8–6, 3–6, 6–2	(Australia) Clemenger / (Australia) Moon	(Australia) Akhurst / (Australia) Marjorie Cox; 6–2, 6–4	(Australia) Bickerton / (Australia) Le Mesurier	(Australia) Moon / (Australia) Akhurst; 13-11, 6–1	(Australia) Baker / (Australia) Meaney
March -5	London Covered Courts Championships; London, United Kingdom	(United Kingdom) John Olliff; 6–1, 2–6, 6–3, 6–4	(United Kingdom) Stan Harris	(United Kingdom) Peggy Mitchell; 9–7, 4–6, 6–4	(United Kingdom) Joan Strawson		
March -5	London Covered Courts Championships; London, United Kingdom	(United Kingdom) Crole-Rees / (United Kingdom) Eames; 2–6, 4–6, 6–3, 6–4, 6–3	(United Kingdom) Olliff / (United Kingdom) Helmore	(United Kingdom) Mitchell / (United Kingdom) Ridley; 9-11, 6–3, 7–5	(United Kingdom) Colyer / Hill	(United Kingdom) Harris / (United Kingdom) Ridley; 6–4, 5–7, 6–4	(United Kingdom) Eames / (United Kingdom) Colyer
March -6	Monaco Cup; Monte-Carlo, Monaco	(France) Henri Cochet; 8–6, 6–4, 6–4	(Italy) Umberto de Morpurgo	(United Kingdom) Betty Nuthall; 7–5, 5–7, 6–4	(United Kingdom) Eileen Bennett		
March -6	Monaco Cup; Monte-Carlo, Monaco	(Italy) Morpurgo / (Hungary) von Kehrling; 7–5, 6–3, 2–6, 7–9, 6–1	(Denmark) Worm / (Monaco) Gallepe	(United Kingdom) Fry / (United Kingdom) Morill; 4–6, 6–0, 6–4	(United Kingdom) Covell / (United Kingdom) Satterthwaite	(France) Cochet / (United Kingdom) Bennett; 6–4, 6–4	(Czechoslovakia) Kozeluh / (United Kingdom) Satterthwaite
March -6	Monaco Cup; Monte-Carlo, Monaco	Butler Trophy (France) Cochet / (France) Brugnon def. (United Kingdom) Peters / (United Kingdom) Lyttleton-Rogers^{[a]} 6–3, 6–0, 6–2		Beaumont Trophy (United Kingdom) Covell / (United Kingdom) Nuthall def. (France) Mathieu / (France) Barbier; 4–6, 6–2, 6–2			
March -9	French Riviera Championships and Nations Cup; Menton, France	(Hungary) Béla von Kehrling; 6–4, 7–5, 6–1	(Austria) Franz Wilhelm Matejka	(United Kingdom) Phyllis Covell; 6–4, 9–7	(Weimar Republic) Cilly Aussem		
March -9	French Riviera Championships and Nations Cup; Menton, France	(Denmark) Worm / (Hungary) von Kehrling; 8–6, 6–3, 6–1	(United States) Coen / (United States) O'Connell	(United Kingdom) Morill / (Italy) Valerio; 6–4, 2–6, 7–5	(United Kingdom) Covell / (United Kingdom) Satterthwaite	(Hungary) von Kehrling / (Weimar Republic) Aussem; 3–6, 6–1, 7–5	(Denmark) Worm / (United Kingdom) Satterthwaite
March -9	French Riviera Championships and Nations Cup; Menton, France	Nations Cup (United Kingdom) Lyttleton-Rogers^{[b]} / (United Kingdom) Covell def. (United Kingdom) Hillyard / (United Kingdom) Satterthwaite; 6–3, 1–6, 6–2					
March -9	Florida Championship; Palm Beach, United States	(United States) Francis Hunter; 1–6, 6–4, 9–7, 7–5	(United States) John F. Hennessey				
March -9	Florida Championship; Palm Beach, United States	(United States) van Ryn / (United States) Allison; 7–5, 1–6, 7–5, 6–4	(United States) Hennessey / (United States) Hunter				
March 4–11	Juan-les-Pins Championship; Juan-les-Pins, France	(France) Henri Cochet; 6–3, 6–3, 6–4	(France) Emanuelle du Plaix	(United Kingdom) Eileen Bennett; 7–5, 6–0	Annemarie Löwenthal		
March 4–11	Juan-les-Pins Championship; Juan-les-Pins, France	(France) Cochet / (Switzerland) Aeschlimann; 6–2, 6–1	(Monaco) Gallepe / (France) Landry	Not known	Not known	(France) Cochet / (United Kingdom) Bennett; 6–2, 3–6, 6–3	(Switzerland) Aeschlimann / (France) Jung
March 9–11	American covered courts tournaments New York (Men), Brookline (women), United States	(France) Jean Borotra; 6–4, 6–0, 4–6, 8–6	(United States) Francis Hunter	(United States) Margaret Blake; 6–3, 6–3	(United States) Anna Fuller Hubbard		
March 9–11	American covered courts tournaments New York (Men), Brookline (women), United States	(United States) Tilden / (United States) Hunter; 6–4, 6–2, 1–6, 6–2	(France) Borotra / (United States) Washburn	(United States) Wightman / (United States) Palfrey; 6–2, 6–2	(United States) Hubbard / (United States) Blake	(United States) Hate / (United States) Blake; 5–7, 6–2, 6–2	(United States) Hill / (United States) Palfrey
March -16	Bordighera Championship; Bordighera, Italy	(Italy) Giorgio de Stefani; 6–1, 5–7, 8–6	(Hungary) Béla von Kehrling	(United Kingdom) Phyllis Satterthwaite; 6–1, 7–5	(Italy) Lucia Valerio		
March -16	Bordighera Championship; Bordighera, Italy	(Denmark) Worm / (Hungary) Kehrling; Not known	(Italy) de Stefani / (France) Brugnon	(United Kingdom) Morill / (United Kingdom) Satterthwaite; Not known	(Italy) Perelli / (Italy) Valerio	(United Kingdom) Peters / (Italy) Valerio; Not known	(Denmark) Worm / (United Kingdom) Satterthwaite
March 11–19	South of France Championships^{[c]} Nice, France	(France) Emanuelle du Plaix; 3–6, 6–1, 6–3, 6–2	(Austria) Hermann Artens	(Weimar Republic) Paula von Reznicek; 6–8, 6–2, 6–4	(United Kingdom) Phyllis Covell		
March 11–19	South of France Championships^{[c]} Nice, France	(Switzerland) Aeschlimann / (Monaco) Gallepe; 6–2, 1–6, 2–6, 6–4, 6–4	(United States) Coen / (United States) O'Connell	(United Kingdom) Covell / (United Kingdom) Thomas; 6–3, 6–2	Marjolet / Martin	(United States) Coen / (Weimar Republic) Aussem; 6–3, 10-8	(Switzerland) Aeschlimann / Rice
March 11–19	Surrey Hard Court Championshipss; Surbiton, United Kingdom	(United Kingdom) Nigel Sharpe; 6–1, 6–1, 10-8	(United Kingdom) Stan Harris	(United Kingdom) Ermyntrude Harvey; 6–4, 6–2	(United Kingdom) Phyllis Mudford		
March 11–19	Surrey Hard Court Championshipss; Surbiton, United Kingdom	(United Kingdom) Greig / (United Kingdom) Helmore; 9–7, 6–3, 5–7, 6–4	(United Kingdom) Crole-Rees / (United Kingdom) Olliff	(United Kingdom) Colyer / Hill; 8–6, 6–3	(United Kingdom) Harvey / Thompson	(United Kingdom) Crole-Rees / (United Kingdom) Harvey; 6–2, 4–6, 6–3	(United Kingdom) Olliff / (United Kingdom) Colyer
Late March	Alassio International; Alassio, Italy	(France) Jacques Brugnon; 6–3, 6–4, 6–1	(United Kingdom) Pat Hughes	Not known	Not known		
Late March	Alassio International; Alassio, Italy	(France) Brugnon / (United Kingdom) Hughes; 6–2, 6–4, 6–3	(India) Fyzee / (United Kingdom) Whitmore	Not known /	Not known	(United Kingdom) Hughes / Hunt; 3–6, 7–5, 6–3	(France) Brugnon / Turton
Late March	Southern Pro; Palm Beach, United States	(South Africa) Brian Norton; 8–6, 7–5, 6–1	(United States) Vincent Richards				
March 18–24	Côte d'Azur Championships; Cannes, France	(France) Emanuelle du Plaix; 8–6, 6–2, 9–7	(Weimar Republic) Fritz Kuhlmann	(Spain) Lilí Álvarez; 6–4, 6–1	(Weimar Republic) Paula von Reznicek		
March 18–24	Côte d'Azur Championships; Cannes, France	(Switzerland) Aeschlimann / (Monaco) Gallepe; 3–6, 6–4, 0–6, 6–3, 6–1	(United Kingdom) Lester / (United Kingdom) Kingsley	(France) Lafaurie / (United Kingdom) Covell; 7–5, 6–8, 6–4	(United Kingdom) Thomas / (Weimar Republic) von Reznicek	(Switzerland) Aeschlimann / (France) Lafaurie; 8–6, 6–4	(United Kingdom) Covell / (United Kingdom) Covell
March 19-	Italian Riviera Championships; Sanremo, Italy	Not known	Not known	(Italy) Lucia Valerio; Not known	(United Kingdom) Phyllis Satterthwaite		
March 24-	Danish Covered Courts Championships; Copenhagen, Denmark	(Weimar Republic) Hans Moldenhauer; 6–4, 6–4, 6–3	(Denmark) Povl Henriksen	(Weimar Republic) Irmgard Rost; 7–5, 4–6, 6–1	(Weimar Republic) Ilse Friedleben		
March 24-	Danish Covered Courts Championships; Copenhagen, Denmark	(Weimar Republic) Moldenhauer / (Denmark) Rasmussen; 6–4, 6–2	(Weimar Republic) Prenn / (Denmark) Nielsen	(Weimar Republic) Friedleben / (Weimar Republic) Rost; 6–4, 6–2	Not known	(Weimar Republic) Moldenhauer / (Weimar Republic) Rost; 6–3, 4–6, 6–2	(Denmark) Henriksen / (Weimar Republic) Friedleben

== April ==
- Danish Davis cup player Axel Petersen turned pro after a dispute with his own Danish Tennis Association on the refund of his travel costs. He immediately became the coach of the Norway Davis Cup team.
- The German and English Davis Cup trials were held.
- The pre-order for the Wimbledon Championships tickets exceeded 18,000 reservations, which was a 5,500 boost from previous year, while the actual seats were only at 3,500. The reservations required pre-payment. The anticipated income would have been $117,879, 49% uprise from 1928, if not for the money back guarantee for the overbooking, which totalled at $94,969 thus the predicted cash-in was just $22,910.
- Kathleen McKane Godfree announced her withdrawal from the Wimbledon Championships due to health issues.

Month	Event	Men		Women		Mixed	
Month	Event	Champions	Runner-up	Champions	Runner-up	Champions	Runner-up
Early April	Dulwich Covered Court Championships; Dulwich, United Kingdom	(Empire of Japan) Yoshiro Ohta; 6–3, 6–2, 6–2	(United Kingdom) Oswald Turnbull	(United Kingdom) Joan Ridley; 6–4, 7–5	(United Kingdom) Cristobel Wheatcroft		
Early April	Dulwich Covered Court Championships; Dulwich, United Kingdom	(United Kingdom) Olliff / Williams; 6–2, 5–7, 7–5	(Empire of Japan) Ohta / (Empire of Japan) Miki	Not known	Not known	Not known	Not known
Early April	Felixstowe Hard Courts Championship; Felixstowe, Great Britain	(United Kingdom) John Olliff; 7–5, 6–1	(United Kingdom) Gordon Crole-Rees	(United Kingdom) Betty Nuthall; 6–1, 6–2	(United Kingdom) Phoebe Holcroft Watson		
March 25 – April 2	Beausite – L. T. C. de Cannes Championship; Cannes, France	(France) Emanuelle du Plaix; 7–5, 6–1, 4–6, 6–2	(France) Paul Féret	(France) Sylvia Lafaurie; 6–3, 6–3	(United Kingdom) Phyllis Satterthwaite		
March 25 – April 2	Beausite – L. T. C. de Cannes Championship; Cannes, France	(United States) Coen / (France) du Plaix; 4–6, 6–4, 6–3	(France) Glasser / (France) Féret	(United Kingdom) Satterthwaite / (France) Lafaurie; 6–3, 6–3	(United Kingdom) Thomas / Rice	(Monaco) Gallepe / (France) Lafaurie; 6–4, 6–3	(United Kingdom) Hughes / (United Kingdom) Satterthwaite
March 27 -April 2	Biarritz Championships; Biarritz, Switzerland	(France) Pierre Henri Landry; 6–1, 6–3, 6–2	(France) Henri Cochet	(France) Simone Barbier; 6–1, 1–6, 6–4	(France) Jeanne Peyré		
March 27 -April 2	Biarritz Championships; Biarritz, Switzerland	(France) Boussus / (France) de Buzelet; 6–3, 3–6, 6–4, 6–1	(France) Cochet / (France) Landry	(France) Barbier / Leconte; 6–4, 6–0	Marie / (France) Culbert	(France) Boussus / (France) Barbier; 8–6, 8–6	(France) de Buzelet / (France) Le Besnerais
April -8	Swedish Indoors Championships; Stockholm, Sweden	(Sweden) Sune Malmström; 1–6, 7–5, 2–6, 9–7, Not known	(Sweden) Ingvar Garell	(Sweden) Sigrid Fick; 7–5, 6–4	(Sweden) Maggie Lindberg		
April -8	Swedish Indoors Championships; Stockholm, Sweden	(Sweden) Östberg / (Sweden) Ramberg; 6–1, 6–3, 6–2	(Sweden) Müller / (Sweden) Garell	(Sweden) Fick / Nilsson; 6–2, 6–2	(Sweden) Lindberg / (Sweden) Ramberg	(Sweden) Müller / (Sweden) Fick; 6–4, 9–7	(Sweden) H. Ramberg / (Sweden) Ramberg
April 1–9	Beausoleil Cup; Monte-Carlo, Monaco	(Denmark) Erik Worm; 6–2, 6–2, 5–7, 6–3	(United States) Wilbur Coen	Not known	Not known		
April 1–9	Beausoleil Cup; Monte-Carlo, Monaco	Not known	Not known	(United States) Ryan / (United Kingdom) Satterthwaite; 6–2, 6–4	(France) Mathieu / (France) Lafaurie	(United States) O'Connell / (United States) Ryan; 6–0, 6–3	(Denmark) Worm / (United Kingdom) Satterthwaite
April 8-14	Beaulieu Championship; Beaulieu-sur-Mer, France	(France) Emanuelle du Plaix; 6–3, 6–3, 6–3	(Republic of Ireland) George Lyttleton-Rogers	(Spain) Lilí Álvarez; 6–3, 6–3	(Weimar Republic) Paula von Reznicek		
April 8-14	Beaulieu Championship; Beaulieu-sur-Mer, France	(Denmark) Worm / (United Kingdom) Hillyard; 3–6, 6–4, 6–4	(Austria) Salm / (Austria) Artens	(France) Lafaurie / (Spain) Álvarez; 6–4, 6–3	(United States) Ryan / (United Kingdom) Satterthwaite	(Denmark) Worm / (United Kingdom) Satterthwaite; 6–3, 1–6, 6–3	(United States) O'Connell / (United States) Ryan
April -17	Magdalen Park Tournament; London, United Kingdom	(Empire of Japan) Yoshiro Ohta; 5–7, 6–3, 7–5	(United Kingdom) John Olliff	(United Kingdom) Joan Fry; 6–1, 6–1	(United Kingdom) Phyllis Covell		
Mid-April	Roehampton Tournament; Roehampton, United Kingdom	(Empire of Japan) Yoshiro Ohta; 3–6, 6–2, 7–5, 6–2	(United Kingdom) William Powell	(United Kingdom) Elsa Haylock; 6–4, 2–6, 10-8	(United Kingdom) Joan Ridley		
Mid-April	Melbury Hard Court Tournament; London, United Kingdom	(United Kingdom) John Olliff; 6–4, 6–3	(United Kingdom) Oswald Turnbull	(United Kingdom) Eileen Bennett; 6–3, 6–2	(United Kingdom) Phoebe Holcroft Watson		
Mid-April	North London Hard Court Tournament; London, United Kingdom	(France) René Lacoste; 6–1, 6–2, 6–3	(France) Jacques Brugnon	(United Kingdom) Cecily Marriott; 6–4, 6–4	(United Kingdom) Aurea Edgington		
Mid-April	North London Hard Court Tournament; London, United Kingdom	(France) Lacoste / (France) Brugnon; 3–6, 6–1, 6–3, 8–6	Crawford / Hodgson	Not known	Not known	Not known	
April -21	L.T.C. Miramar de Juan-les-Pins Championship; Juan-les-Pins, France	(France) Emanuelle du Plaix; 6–2, 6–1	(United Kingdom) F.R. Scovel	(France) Sylvia Lafaurie; 8–6, 6–4	(France) Daisy Speranza-Wyns		
April -21	L.T.C. Miramar de Juan-les-Pins Championship; Juan-les-Pins, France	Not known / Not known	Not known / Not known	Not known / Not known	Not known / Not known	(United Kingdom) F.R. Scovel / (France) Speranza-Wyns; 6–1, 6–2	(France) du Plaix / (France) Lafaurie
April 21–27	St. Raphaël T.C. Championships; St. Raphaël, France	(Switzerland) Charles Aeschlimann; 4–6, 3–6, 6–4, 6–3, 6–0	(France) Emanuelle du Plaix	Not known	Not known		
April 21–27	St. Raphaël T.C. Championships; St. Raphaël, France	(France) du Plaix / (Switzerland) Aeschlimann; 6–4, 6–4, 6–2	Williams / Beckman	(France) Lafaurie / (France) Speranza-Wyns; 6–4, 6–3	Meldon / Malleson	(Switzerland) Aeschlimann / (France) Lafaurie; 7–5, 4–6, 6–0	(France) du Plaix / (France) Speranza-Wyns
April -27	Ealing Tournament; Ealing, United Kingdom	(United Kingdom) William Powell; 7–5, 6–3	(South Africa) Pat Spence	(United Kingdom) Eileen Bennett; 9–7, 7–5	(United Kingdom) Betty Nuthall		
April -27	Ealing Tournament; Ealing, United Kingdom	Not known	Not known	(United Kingdom) Nuthall / (United Kingdom) Watson; 6-3, 6-4	(United Kingdom) Harvey / (United Kingdom) Mrs. Lycett	(South Africa) Spence / (United Kingdom) Nuthall; 7-5, 6-1	(United Kingdom) Harris / (United Kingdom) Harvey

== May ==
- The mixed French-German team meeting resulted in an overwhelming French victory. Only Christian Boussus lost a match.
- The Dutch women team lost to the Americans.
- Paris beat Amsterdam. The parisiens were led by Henri Cochet and Jacques Brugnon on the men's part.
- Violet Chamberlain beat Eileen Bennett in the Regent's Park.

Month	Event	Men		Women		Mixed	
Month	Event	Champions	Runner-up	Champions	Runner-up	Champions	Runner-up
Early May	Montreux Championships; Montreux, Switzerland	(Denmark) Erik Worm; 7–5, 6–3, 6–0	(United States) O'Connell	(Weimar Republic) Ilse Friedleben; 5–7, 6–2, 12-10	(Italy) Lucia Valerio		
Early May	Montreux Championships; Montreux, Switzerland	(Denmark) Worm / (Switzerland) Fisher; 6–2, 6–3, 6–4	(United States) Covington / (United States) O'Connell	Not known	Not known	(Switzerland) Fisher / (France) Golding; 6–3, 6–2	(Denmark) Worm / (Italy) Valerio
May 7–9; May 4–6; May 3–5; May 4–6; May 4–6	Davis Cup Europe first round Oslo, Norway; Copenhagen, Denmark; Helsinki, Finland; Athens, Greece; Brussels, Belgium	First round winners Hungary 4–1; Denmark 4–1; Egypt 4–1; Greece 4–1; Belgium 4–1	First round losers Norway; Chile; Finland; Yugoslavia; Romania				
April 29-May 4	British Hard Court Championships; Bournemouth, United Kingdom	(United Kingdom) Bunny Austin; 6–3, 6–2, 1–6, 6–4	(South Africa) Louis Raymond	(South Africa) Bobbie Heine; 6–4, 3–6, 8–6	(United Kingdom) Joan Ridley		
April 29-May 4	British Hard Court Championships; Bournemouth, United Kingdom	(United Kingdom) Crole-Rees / (United Kingdom) Eames; 3–6, 6–4, 6–2, 6–3	(United Kingdom) Hughes / (United Kingdom) Peters	(United Kingdom) Goldsack / (United Kingdom) Ridley; 5–7, 12-10, 6–2	(United Kingdom) Shepherd-Barron / (United Kingdom) Covell	(United Kingdom) Hughes / (United Kingdom) Fry; 2–6, 6–3, 6–2	(United Kingdom) Crole-Rees / (United Kingdom) Nuthall
May 4–11	Spanish National Championships; Barcelona, Spain	(Spain) Enrique Maier; 6–1, 6–2, 6–0	(Spain) José-Maria Tejada	(Spain) Lilí Álvarez; 6–1, 6–0	(Spain) Rosa Torras		
May 4–11	Spanish National Championships; Barcelona, Spain	(Spain) Maier / (Spain) Sindreu	(Spain) Saprissa / (Spain) Juanico	(Spain) Torras / M. de la Cruz López de Lerena	Müller / De Mesnard	(Spain) Maier / (Spain) Torras	Fonrodona / Boter
May 9–12	Belgian National Championships	(Belgium) Léopold de Borman; 2–6, 6–2, 6–3, 9–7	(Belgium) André Lacroix	(Belgium) Josane Sigart; 6–3, 6–0	(Belgium) Anne Guyot de Mishaegen		
May 9–12	Belgian National Championships	(Belgium) de Borman / (Belgium) Toussaint; 6–2, 6–1, 6–4	Dewen / Limbosch	(Belgium) Sigart / (Belgium) Waucquez	Not known	(Belgium) Lacroix / (Belgium) Sigart; 6–1, 2–6, 6–2	Bandoup / Ittner
May 15–17 May 11–13 May 7–9 May 17–19; May 10–12	Davis Cup second round Dublin, Ireland Barcelona, Spain; Copenhagen, Denmark; Prague, Czechoslovakia; Budapest, Hungary; The Hague, Netherlands; Saltsjöbaden, Sweden; Warsaw, Poland	Second round winners Italy 5–0; Germany 4–1; Denmark 4–1; Czechoslovakia 3–0; Hungary 3–2; Netherlands 4–1; South Africa 5–0; Great Britain 5–0	Second round losers Ireland; Spain; Greece; Belgium; Monaco; Egypt; Sweden; Poland	left:Jenő Pétery, Béla von Kehrling, Vladimir Landau and René Gallèpe in the Hungary-Monaco Davis Cup tie			
May 11–17	Austrian International Championships; Vienna, Austria	(France) Henri Cochet; 6–4, 6–2, 4–6, 6–4	(Austria) Franz Wilhelm Matejka	(Hungary) Mrs. László Schréder; 3–6, 6–3, 6–4	(Austria) Emmy Hagenauer		
May 11–17	Austrian International Championships; Vienna, Austria	(France) Cochet / (France) Danet; 3–6, 6–3, 6–3, 6–4.	(Austria) Artens / (Austria) Matejka	(Austria) von Ellissen / (Austria) Hagenauer	Not known	(France) Thurneyssen / (Hungary) Mrs. Schréder; 7–5, 6–2	(France) George / (Austria) Eisenmenger
May 16–18	Davis Cup America Zone first round Montreal, Quebec, Canada	First round winners United States 5–0	First round losers Canada				
Around May 19	Berlin Championships; Berlin, Weimar Republic	(France) Henri Cochet; 9-11, 6–3, 6–1, 6–1	(Czechoslovakia) Roderich Menzel	(Weimar Republic) Paula Von Reznicek; 7–5, 6–3	(Weimar Republic) Cilly Aussem		
Around May 19	Berlin Championships; Berlin, Weimar Republic	(France) Cochet / (France) Brugnon; 4–6, 6–3, 6–1, 10-8	(Weimar Republic) Moldenhauer / (Weimar Republic) Prenn	(South Africa) Heine / (South Africa) Neave7–5, 7–5	(Weimar Republic) Peitz / Stephanus	(France) Brugnon / (South Africa) Heine; 2–6, 6–2, 7–5	(France) Cochet / (Weimar Republic) Aussem
Late May	Wiesbaden International Championships; Wiesbaden, Weimar Republic	(Switzerland) Hector Fisher; 6–8, 6–2, 6–3, 4–6, 6–4	(Denmark) Erik Worm	(Weimar Republic) Ilse Friedleben; 6–1, 6–3	(Weimar Republic) Irmgard Rost		
Late May	Wiesbaden International Championships; Wiesbaden, Weimar Republic	(Switzerland) Fisher / (Denmark) Worm; 3–6, 6–4, 6–3, 6–3	(Weimar Republic) Kuhlmann / (Weimar Republic) Buss	Not known	Not known	Not known	Not known
Late May	Blau-Weiss Club tournament Berlin, Weimar Republic	(Austria) Franz Wilhelm Matejka; 6–2, 6–0, 3–6, 6–3	(Denmark) Erik Worm	(Weimar Republic) Ilse Friedleben; 1–6, 6–3, 10-8	(Weimar Republic) Paula Von Reznicek		
Late May	Blau-Weiss Club tournament Berlin, Weimar Republic	(Switzerland) Fisher / (Denmark) Worm; 6–1, 6–2, 6–3	(France) Du Plaix / (France) George	Not known	Not known	Not known	Not known
May -25	Surrey Grass Court Championships; Surbiton, England	(United Kingdom) Eric Peters; 3–6, 6–1, 6–1, 6–3	(United Kingdom) Oswald Turnbull	(United Kingdom) Betty Nuthall; 7–5, 6–1	(United States) Elizabeth Ryan		
May -25	Surrey Grass Court Championships; Surbiton, England	(United Kingdom) Crole-Rees / (United Kingdom) Eames; 6–4, 10-8, 6–4	(United Kingdom) Lycett / (United Kingdom) Peters	(United States) Ryan / (United Kingdom) Nuthall; 6–4, 6–3	(United Kingdom) Fry / Sherry	(United Kingdom) Crole-Rees / (United States) Ryan; 6–2, 7–5	(Empire of Japan) Miki / (United Kingdom) Mudford
May 17–25	Davis Cup America Zone second round Chevy Chase, Maryland, United States; Montreal, Quebec, Canada	First round winners United States 4–1; Cuba 4–1	First round losers Japan; Mexico				

== June ==
- The International Lawn Tennis Federation declared that it acknowledged only the Federation of Sportive Societies in Romania as the Romanian tennis governing body and only its member clubs are authorized to organize tennis events and prohibited players to enter any tournament, which weren't endorsed by the Romanian federation.
- The British ladies' team beat the South Africans'.
- The United States Davis Cup team beat flawlessly the British reserve Davis Cup team.
- René Lacoste announced his withdrawal from the Wimbledon Championships due to his business affairs.
- The German ladies' team had a close victory over the American women's team.
- Leila Claude-Anet became the French junior champion, André Merlin were crowned on the boys' part.
- The British ladies' team beat the French rivals without losing a match.

Month	Event	Men		Women		Mixed	
Month	Event	Champions	Runner-up	Champions	Runner-up	Champions	Runner-up
May 30-June 1	Davis Cup America zone final Detroit, Michigan, United States	First round winners United States 5–0	First round losers Cuba				
5–9 June	Davis Cup Europe zone quarterfinal Hamburg, Germany; Copenhagen, Denmark; Budapest, Hungary; Bournemouth, England	QF winners Germany 3-2; Czechoslovakia 4-1; Hungary 3-2; Great Britain 5-0	QF losers Italy; Denmark; Netherlands; South Africa				
Early June	German Pro Championships; Berlin, Weimar Republic	(Weimar Republic) Roman Najuch	Not known				
Early June	German Pro Championships; Berlin, Weimar Republic	(France) Ramillon / (Republic of Ireland) Burke	(Weimar Republic) Najuch/Richter				
May 20-June 2	French Championships; Paris, France; Men's singles – Men's Doubles – Women's singles	(France) René Lacoste; 6–3, 2–6, 6–0, 2–6, 8–6	(France) Jean Borotra	(United States) Helen Wills Moody; 6–3, 6–4	(France) Simonne Mathieu		
May 20-June 2	French Championships; Paris, France; Men's singles – Men's Doubles – Women's singles	(France) Lacoste / (France) Borotra; 6–3, 3–6, 6–3, 3–6, 8–6	(France) Brugnon / (France) Cochet	(Spain) Álvarez / (Netherlands) Bouman; 7–5, 6–3	(South Africa) Heine / (South Africa) Neave	(France) Cochet / (United States) Bennett; 6–3, 6–2	(United States) Hunter / (United States) Wills Moody
June -15	Dutch International Championships; Noordwijk, Netherlands	(United States) Bill Tilden; 6–4, 6–2, 6–3	(United States) Francis Hunter	(Belgium) Josane Sigart; 6–4, 6–4	(Netherlands) Kea Bouman		
June -15	Dutch International Championships; Noordwijk, Netherlands	(United States) Tilden / (United States) Hunter; 6–3, 6–3, 7–5	(United States) Coen / (Netherlands) Timmer	(Netherlands) Couquerque / (Netherlands) Bouman; 6–4, 6–4	(Netherlands) Dros-Canters / Kallmayer	(Egypt) Grandguillot / (Belgium) Sigart; 6–2, 8–6	(Romania) Mişu / (Weimar Republic) Krahwinkel
June 9–16	Tri-State Tennis Tournament; Cincinnati, United States	(United States) Herbert Bowman; 2–6, 6–4, 6–4, 6–1	(United States) Julius Seligson	(United States) Clara Louise Zinke; 6–2, 6–34	(United States) Ruth Riese		
June 9–16	Tri-State Tennis Tournament; Cincinnati, United States	(United States) Bowman / (United States) Pare; 4–6, 6–2, 6–2, 6–8, 6–4	(United States) Jennings / (United States) Royer				
June 10–16	Czechoslovakian International Championships; Prague, Czechoslovakia	(France) Henri Cochet; 2–6, 6–8, 6–2, 7–5, 8–6	(France) Christian Boussus	(Czechoslovakia) Mrs. Kozeluh; 6–2, 6–4	Korotvikova		
June 10–16	Czechoslovakian International Championships; Prague, Czechoslovakia	(France) Cochet / (France) Boussus; 4–6, 6–3, 7–5, 6–2	(Czechoslovakia) Kozeluh / (Czechoslovakia) Macenauer	N!A	Not known	Not known	Not known
June -17	Kent Championships; Beckenham, United Kingdom	(United Kingdom) Harry Lee; 7-5, 6-4, 6-2	(United Kingdom) Charles Kingsley	(United Kingdom) Phyllis Covell; 6–1, 6–4	(United Kingdom) Peggy Mitchell		
June -17	Kent Championships; Beckenham, United Kingdom	(United Kingdom) Lycett / (United Kingdom) Wheatley; 6–2, 6–5, 6–3	(Japan) Ohta / (Japan) Miki	(United Kingdom) Nuthall / (United States) Elizabeth Ryan; 6–3, 6–1	(United Kingdom) Harvey / (United Kingdom) McIlquham	(South Africa) Raymond/ (South Africa) Bobbie Heine; 8-6, 6-1	(United Kingdom) Harris / (United Kingdom) Ridley
Mid-June	Danish National Championships; Denmark	(Denmark) Einer Ulrich; 6–3, 6–2, 3–6, 6–1	(Denmark) Arne Veslchou Rasmussen	(Denmark) Else Dam; 6–3, 1–6, 6–2	(Denmark) Tove Morville		
Mid-June	Danish National Championships; Denmark	(Denmark) Henriksen / (Denmark) Gleerup; 6–1, 7–5, 10-8	(Denmark) Rasmussen / (Denmark) Holst	Not known	Not known	(Denmark) Ulrich / (Denmark) Dam; 6–1, 7–5	(Denmark) Bache / Morville
June 14–21	Davis Cup Europe Zone Semifinal; Prague, Czechoslovakia; Budapest, Hungary	SF winners Germany 4-1; Great Britain 3-2	SF losers Czechoslovakia; Hungary				
June 19–23	Swiss National Championships; Luzern, Switzerland	(Switzerland) Maurice Férrier; 6–2, 6–8, 3–6, 6–2, 6–2	(Switzerland) Jean Wuarin	(Switzerland) Emmy Schäublin; 6–3, 6–1	(Switzerland) Fehlmann		
June 19–23	Swiss National Championships; Luzern, Switzerland	(Switzerland) Wuarin / (Switzerland) Férrier; 6–2, 7–9, 6–0, 12-10	(Switzerland) Aeschlimann / (Switzerland) A. Ernst	Fehlmann / (Switzerland) Simon; 6–3, 6–3	Schardt / Steinfels	(Switzerland) Aeschlimann / Fehlmann; 6–3, 6–4	Raisin / Steinfels
Late June	Norwegian National Championships; Norway	(Norway) Torleif Torkildsen; 6–1, 6–4, 6–l	(Norway) Toralf Herstad	(Norway) Agga Anderssen; 6–4, 6–1	(Norway) Ada Werring		
Late June	Northern Championships; Liverpool, United Kingdom	(France) Jacques Brugnon; 3–6, 7–5, 6–1, 6–1	(United Kingdom) Donald Greig	(United Kingdom) Winifred Bower; 6–1, 3–6, 6–1	(United Kingdom) Joan Strawson		
Late June	Northern Championships; Liverpool, United Kingdom	(France) Brugnon / (United States) Covington; 6–4, 6–3	(United Kingdom) Radcliffe / Carlton	Not known	Not known	(United Kingdom) Greig / (United Kingdom) Strawson; Not known	(France) Brugnon / (United Kingdom) Bower
Late June	Queen's Club Championships; London, United Kingdom	(United States) Bill Tilden and (United States) Francis Hunter prize shared due to rain		(United States) Elizabeth Ryan; 6–2, 2–6, 6–2	(United Kingdom) Elsie Goldsack		
Late June	Queen's Club Championships; London, United Kingdom	(United States) Tilden / (United States) Hunter; 9-11, 6–2, 7–5, 6–3	(United States) Van Ryn / (United States) Allison	(United Kingdom) Goldsack / Jameson; 6–3, 7–5	(United Kingdom) Morill / (United States) Bundy	Not known	Not known

== July ==
- Olympian tennis player, promoter and referee Charles Voigt died during Wimbledon in London.
- An electronic scoreboard was introduced on the Wimbledon court for the first time in history.
- The Poland Davis Cup team beat the Hungarian reserve team by one rubber.
- The Oslo Cup was won by Torleif Torkildsen.
- The international tournament in Sárospatak (Hungary) was won by Béla von Kehrling. The field included various Davis Cup players such as Gheorghe Lupu, Alexandru Botez (Romania), Ludwig von Salm-Hoogstraeten (Austria), the Stołarow-brothers (Poland), Franjo Šefer (Yugoslavia) and the Hungary Davis Cup team.
- The Czechoslovakia Davis Cup team lost two non Davis-Cup matches in a row to Hungary (3-2) and South Africa (5-2).

Month	Event	Men		Women		Mixed	
Month	Event	Champions	Runner-up	Champions	Runner-up	Champions	Runner-up
June 24–July 6	The Championships, Wimbledon; London, United Kingdom; Men's singles – Women's singles	(France) Henri Cochet; 6–4, 6–3, 6–4	(France) Jean Borotra	(United States) Helen Wills; 6–1, 6–2	(United States) Helen Hull Jacobs	All England Plate (United States) Bud Chandler def. (United Kingdom) William Powell; 6–4, 3–6 6–2	
June 24–July 6	The Championships, Wimbledon; London, United Kingdom; Men's singles – Women's singles	(United States) Allison / (United States) Van Ryn; 6–4, 5–7, 6–3, 10–12, 6–4	(United Kingdom) Collins / (United Kingdom) Gregory	(United Kingdom) Watson / (United Kingdom) Saunders; 6–4, 8–6	(United Kingdom) Covell / (United Kingdom) Shepherd Barron	(United States) Hunter / (United States) Wills; 6–1, 6–4	/ (United Kingdom) Fry / (United Kingdom) Collins
July 5	Yugoslavian Championships; Zagreb, Kingdom of Serbs, Croats and Slovenes	(Socialist Federal Republic of Yugoslavia) Franjo Šefer; 7–5, 7–5, 6–2	(Socialist Federal Republic of Yugoslavia) Krešimir Friedrich	(Socialist Federal Republic of Yugoslavia) Vera Vujić; 7–5, 6–1	(Socialist Federal Republic of Yugoslavia) Vlasta Gostiša		
July 5	Yugoslavian Championships; Zagreb, Kingdom of Serbs, Croats and Slovenes	(Socialist Federal Republic of Yugoslavia) Šefer / (Socialist Federal Republic of Yugoslavia) Kukuljević; 6–4, 3–6, 9–7, 4–6, 8–6	(Socialist Federal Republic of Yugoslavia) K. Friedrich / (Socialist Federal Republic of Yugoslavia) D. Friedrich	Not known	Not known	(Socialist Federal Republic of Yugoslavia) Kukuljević / (Socialist Federal Republic of Yugoslavia) Vujić; 7–5, 6–3	(Socialist Federal Republic of Yugoslavia) Šefer / Schwaickhardt
July -11	US National Clay Court Championships; Indianapolis, Indiana, United States	(United States) Emmett Pare; 6–4, 6–3, 4–6, 3–6, 6–1	(United States) Gilbert Hall				
July -11	US National Clay Court Championships; Indianapolis, Indiana, United States	(United States) Mercur / (United States) Hall; 10-12, 3–6, 6–2, 9–7, 6–4	(United States) Kussman / (United States) Gorchakoff				
July 12–14	Davis Cup Europe Zone Final; Berlin, Germany	Winner Germany 3–2	Loser Great Britain				
Mid-July	Portugal National Championships; Portugal	(Portugal) José De Verda; 6–2, 6–2, 7–5	(Portugal) António Casanovas	(Portugal) Angelica Plantier; 6–3, 6–0	(Portugal) Carvalho		
Mid-July	Portugal National Championships; Portugal	(Portugal) De Verda / (Portugal) Pinto-Coelho; 6–2, 2–6, 7–5, 6–2	(Portugal) Vasconcelos / (Portugal) Casanovas	Not known	Not known	(Portugal) Vasconcelos / Plantier; 6–1, 6–3	(Portugal) De Verda / Ribeiro
Mid-July	Strasbourg International Championships; Strasbourg, France	(France) Jacques Brugnon; 8–6, 7–5, 6–1	(Weimar Republic) Philipp Buss	(Weimar Republic) Ilse Friedleben; 5–7, 6–4, 6–3	(France) Germanine Charnelet		
Mid-July	Strasbourg International Championships; Strasbourg, France	(France) Brugnon / (Weimar Republic) Buss; 6–0, 6–1	(France) Féret / Garrey	Not known	Not known	(Weimar Republic) Buss / (France) Mathieu; 6–3, 8–6	(France) Brugnon / (Weimar Republic) Friedleben
Mid-July	Bavarian International Championships; Munich, Weimar Republic	(Italy) Alberto Del Bono; 6–4, 6–4	(Denmark) Erik Worm	(Weimar Republic) Klara Hammer; 6–4, 4–6, 7–5	(Weimar Republic) Irmgard Rost		
Mid-July	Bavarian International Championships; Munich, Weimar Republic	(Italy) Del Bono / (Denmark) Worm; 6–3, 1–6, 6–3	(Denmark) Rasmussen / Sildhoff	Not known	Not known	(Denmark) Worm / (Weimar Republic) Hammer; 6–3, 6–4	(Italy) Del Bono / (Weimar Republic) Rost
July 18–21	Düsseldorf Tournament; Düsseldorf, Weimar Republic	(France) Jean Borotra; 4–6, 6–4, 6–3, 6–4	(Empire of Japan) Yoshiro Ohta				
July 19–21	Davis Cup Inter-Zonal Zone Final; Berlin, Germany	Winner United States 5–0	Loser Germany				
July 15–20	Scottish National Grass Court Championships; Murrayfield, Scotland	(United Kingdom) Colin Gregory; 6–2, 6–3, 9–7	(United Kingdom) Ian Collins	(United Kingdom) Joan Ridley; 6–0, 6–4	(United Kingdom) Helen Milne Barr		
July 15–20	Scottish National Grass Court Championships; Murrayfield, Scotland	(United Kingdom) H.G.N. Lee / (United Kingdom) Scovell; 6–4, 6–3, 7–5	(United Kingdom) Ian Collins / (United Kingdom) W.A.R. Collins	(United Kingdom) Joan Ridley / (United Kingdom) Sterry; 1–6, 6–2, 6–4	(United Kingdom) Barr / (United Kingdom) Watson	(United Kingdom) J.C. Gregory / (United Kingdom) Watson; 1–6, 6–2, 6–4	(United Kingdom) Lee / (United Kingdom) Ridley
July 15–20	Irish Championships; Dublin, Ireland	(United Kingdom) John Olliff; 4-6, 6–3, 1–6, 6–2, 6–4	(Republic of Ireland) George Lyttleton-Rogers	(South Africa) Bobbie Heine; 3–6, 6–3, 6–2	(South Africa) Billie Tapscott		
July 15–20	Irish Championships; Dublin, Ireland	(Republic of Ireland) McGuire / Mack; 6-2, 6-2, 4-6, 6-2	(Republic of Ireland) Lyttleton-Rogers / (United Kingdom) Olliff	(South Africa) Heine / (South Africa) Neave; 6-8, 6-4, 6-4	(South Africa) Cole / (South Africa) Tapscott	(Republic of Ireland) Meldon / (South Africa) Smidt; 4-6, 6-4, 6-2	(Republic of Ireland) Lyttleton-Rogers / (South Africa) Tapscott
July 15–20	Welsh Championships; Newport, Wales	(United Kingdom) Charles Kingsley; 7–5, 6–4, 4–6, 8–6	(United Kingdom) William Powell	(United Kingdom) Eleanor Rose	Not known		
July 15–20	Welsh Championships; Newport, Wales	(United Kingdom) Peters / (United Kingdom) Kingsley	(United Kingdom) Phillips / Tuckett	(United Kingdom) Eleanor Rose / Not known	Not known	(United Kingdom) Eleanor Rose / Not known	Not known
July 22–25	Pro Championships of Great Britain; London, United Kingdom	(United Kingdom) Dan Maskell; 6–2, 6–4, 6–2	J. Pearce				
July 22–25	Pro Championships of Great Britain; London, United Kingdom	W.H. Dear / T.C.Jeffrey; 3-6, 6-2, 8-6, 9-7	C.H.Read / (United Kingdom) Maskell				
Late July	Grand Hotel Panhans Championships; Semmering, Austria	(Czechoslovakia) Jan Koželuh; 6–3, 12-10, 4–6, 6–3	(Czechoslovakia) Roderich Menzel	Deutsch; 7–5, 3-0, ret.	(Czechoslovakia) Koželuh		
Late July	Grand Hotel Panhans Championships; Semmering, Austria	(Czechoslovakia) Rohrer / (Czechoslovakia) Menzel vs. (Czechoslovakia) Koželuh / (Austria) Matejka		Grave / (United Kingdom) Thomas; 6–4, 8–6	(Austria) E. Hagenauer / (Weimar Republic) von Ellisen	(Hungary) Kehrling / (Hungary) Mrs. Schréder; 6–3, 8–6	(Czechoslovakia) Menzel / Brehm
Late July	Gstaad Championships; Gstaad, Switzerland	(Switzerland) Hector Fisher; 6–3, 8–6, 6–4	(Austria) Hermann Artens	(Switzerland) Lolette Payot w/o	(France) Germaine Golding		
Late July	Gstaad Championships; Gstaad, Switzerland	(Austria) Artens / (Switzerland) Simon; 2–6, 6–2, 6–2, 5–7, 6–4	(Switzerland) Fisher / "Jenny"	Not known	Not known	Not known	Not known
July -27	Canadian Lawn Tennis National Championships; Toronto, Ontario, Canada	(Canada) Jack Wright; 6–4, 6–4, 1–6, 7–5	(United States) Frank Shields	(Canada) Olive Wade; 6–0, 1–6, 6–1	(United States) Ruth Riese		
July -27	Canadian Lawn Tennis National Championships; Toronto, Ontario, Canada	(Canada) Crocker / (Canada) Wright	(United States) Shields / (United States) D Strachan	(Canada) Mrs OE Gray / (Canada) Wade	(Canada) Mrs. Beer / P Rykert	(Canada) C.W. Aikman / (Canada) Mrs. Beer (Canada) Ch. W. Leslie / Miss Grierson prizes divided due to rain	
July 26–28	Davis Cup challenge round Paris, France	Champion France 3–2	Runner-up United States				

== August ==
- Italian and French teams played a tie in Evian. None of the Four Musketeers participated.
- Elizabeth Ryan was expelled off the United States Wightman Cup team because of her excessive commitment to European tournaments. Despite the appeal of Helen Wills Moody Ryan was declared stateless in terms of tennis.
- Bill Tilden permanently won the Newport Casino Invitational trophy after three consecutive victories.

Month	Event	Men		Women		Mixed	
Month	Event	Champions	Runner-up	Champions	Runner-up	Champions	Runner-up
August 9	Wightman Cup; Forest Hills, United States			(United Kingdom) Great Britain 4–3	United States		
August 4–11	German International Championships; Hamburg, Weimar Republic	(France) Christian Boussus; 6–1, 4–6, 6–1, 6–8, 6–1	(Weimar Republic) Otto Froitzheim	(Weimar Republic) Paula von Reznicek; 6–2, 5–7, 6–0	(United Kingdom) Violet Chamberlain		
August 4–11	German International Championships; Hamburg, Weimar Republic	(France) Brugnon / (France) Boussus; 8–6, 6–2, 6–4	(France) Landry / (South Africa) Spence	(United Kingdom) Fry / (United Kingdom) Colyer; 6–3, 6–3	(United Kingdom) Haylock / (United Kingdom) Chamberlain	(United Kingdom) Lee / (United Kingdom) Colyer; 4–6, 6–1, 6–2	(Weimar Republic) Moldenhauer / (Weimar Republic) Rost
August 19–25	Swiss International Championships; Genève, Switzerland	(Japan) Yoshiro Ohta; 4–6, 6–4, 3–6, 6–2, 6–3	(Denmark) Erik Worm	(Spain) Bella Dutton de Pons; 6–3 3–6 9–7	(Switzerland) Lolette Payot		
August 19–25	Swiss International Championships; Genève, Switzerland	(Republic of Ireland) Lyttleton-Rogers / (Japan) Ohta; 6–2, 5–7, 6–4, 6–2	(United States) Sweetzer / (Italy) Martino	(South Africa) Petchell / (Spain) de Pons; 6–1, 6–2	Ruprecht / Wisard	(Switzerland) Férrier / (Switzerland) Payot; 6–1, 6–4	(Denmark) Worm / (Spain) Pons
August 19–24	13th ATA All-Black National Championships; Bordentown, United States	(United States) Edgar George Brown; 0–6, 4–6, 6–3, Not known, 6–0	(United States) James Stocks	(United States) Ora Washington; 4–6, 6–4, 6–2	(United States) Frances Gittens		
August 19–24	13th ATA All-Black National Championships; Bordentown, United States	(United States) Saitch / (United States) Smith; 6–4, 1–6, 6–2	(United States) Downing / (United States) McGriff	Not known	Not known	Not known	Not known
August 19–24	Newport Casino Invitational; Newport, Rhode Island, United States	(United States) Bill Tilden; 6–2, 3–6, 6–4, 5–7, 6–3	(United States) George Lott				

== September ==
- The British Wightman Cup team defeated the Californian State team five to one.
- The Hungarian-English mixed team match ended in 5-3.
- The Greece Davis Cup team beat the Hungarian reserve team 3-2
- Pál Aschner became the Hungarian boys' junior champion, Zsuzsi Havassy won the girls'.
- A 24-rubber Netherlands-Belgium non-Davis Cup match resulted in a massive Dutch victory.
- Jimmy Nuthall, Betty Nuthall's younger brother won the English junior championships alongside Margaret Scriven on the girls' part.
- Imre Takáts was sidelined with an appendectomy.
- Jenny Sandison was thought to have set a new lowest time record for a final when she won the Cranleigh final, which lasted only twenty minutes.

Month	Event	Men		Women		Mixed	
Month	Event	Champions	Runner-up	Champions	Runner-up	Champions	Runner-up
August 26–September 1	German National Championship	(Weimar Republic) Friedrich Frenz; 7–5, 6–8, 6–2, 6–2	(Weimar Republic) Fritz Kuhlmann	(Weimar Republic) Hilde Krahwinkel Sperling; 6–3, 6–1	(Weimar Republic) Anne Peitz		
August 26–September 1	German National Championship	(Weimar Republic) Frenz / (Weimar Republic) von Cramm; 6–2, 2–6, 6–4, 6–3	Remmert / Zander	(Weimar Republic) Krahwinkel / (Weimar Republic) Peitz	Not known	(Weimar Republic) Kuhlmann / (Weimar Republic) Krahwinkel; 6–4, 6–2	(Weimar Republic) Frenz / (Weimar Republic) Peitz
September 2–9	Hungarian International Championship; Budapest, Hungary	(Hungary) Béla von Kehrling; 7–5, 4–6, 6–3, ret.	(Czechoslovakia) Roderich Menzel	(Weimar Republic) Hilde Krahwinkel; 6–4, 6–1	(Weimar Republic) Ellen Hoffmann		
September 2–9	Hungarian International Championship; Budapest, Hungary	(Czechoslovakia) Menzel / (Czechoslovakia) Rohrer; 7–5, 6–2, 6–4	(Weimar Republic) Frenz / (Weimar Republic) Heine	(United Kingdom) McIlquham / (United Kingdom) Colyer; 3–6, 6–2, 6–4	(Czechoslovakia) Rohrer / (Czechoslovakia) Deutsch	(Czechoslovakia) Menzel / (Hungary) Mrs. Göncz; 6–4, 2–6, 6–1	(Hungary) Kehrling / (Hungary) Mrs. Schréder
August 19 – September 14	US National Championships; Forest Hills, United States (ladies); Chestnut Hill, United States (doubles, mixed doubles)	(United States) Bill Tilden; 3–6, 6–3, 4–6, 6–2, 6–4	(United States) Francis Hunter	(United States) Helen Wills Moody; 6–2, 6–2	(United Kingdom) Phoebe Holcroft Watson		
August 19 – September 14	US National Championships; Forest Hills, United States (ladies); Chestnut Hill, United States (doubles, mixed doubles)	(United States) Lott / (United States) Doeg; 10-8, 16–14, 6–1	(United States) Bell / (United States) White	(United Kingdom) Watson / (United Kingdom) Michell; 2–6, 6–2, 6–4	(United Kingdom) Barron / (United Kingdom) Covell	(United States) Lott / (United Kingdom) Nuthall; 6–3, 6–3	(United Kingdom) Austin / (United Kingdom) Covell
September 7–15	Adriatic Championships; Trieste, Italy	(France) Emanuelle Du Plaix	(United Kingdom) Harry Lee	(United States) Elizabeth Ryan; 7–5, 6–4	(Italy) Maud Rosenbaum Levi		
September 7–15	Adriatic Championships; Trieste, Italy	Not known / Not known	Not known / Not known	(France) Barbier / (United States) Ryan; 6–2, 6–2	(Italy) Luzzatti / (Italy) Levi	(France) Brugnon / (United States) Ryan	(United Kingdom) Hughes / (Italy) Levi
September 7–15	Adriatic Championships; Trieste, Italy	Butler Trophy (France) Boussus / (France) Brugnon def. (Austria) Artens / (Austria) Salm-Hoogstraeten; 6–2, 6–1, 6–4		Prince of Piedmont Trophy (Czechoslovakia) Jan Koželuh def. (Austria) Hermann Artens; 6–3, 3–6, 6–4, 6–2			
Mid-September	German Pro Championships; Berlin, Weimar Republic	(Weimar Republic) Roman Najuch; 6–0, 6–4 7–9, 6–3	(Weimar Republic) Hermann Bartelt				
Mid-September	German Pro Championships; Berlin, Weimar Republic	(Republic of Ireland) Burke / (France) Ramillon; 1–6, 2–6, 7–5, ret.	(Weimar Republic) Najuch / Richter				
Mid-September	Montreux International Championship; Montreux, Switzerland	(France) Christian Boussus; 6–4, 9–7, 6–2	(Republic of Ireland) George Lyttleton-Rogers	(Switzerland) Lolette Payot; 9–7, 3–6, 6–4	(Weimar Republic) Irmgard Rost		
Mid-September	Montreux International Championship; Montreux, Switzerland	(Denmark) Worm / (Switzerland) Fisher; 6–4, 9–7, 6–2	(France) Boussus / (France) Buzelet	(Switzerland) Payot / (Weimar Republic) Rost; 7–5, 6–2	(Spain) Pons / (South Africa) Petchell	(Switzerland) Fisher / (Switzerland) Payot; 6–4, 11-9, 6–3	(France) Boussus / Beardsley
Mid-September	US Pro Championships; Forest Hills, United States	(Czechoslovakia) Karel Koželuh; 6–4, 6–4, 4–6, 4–6, 7–5	(United States) Vincent Richards				
Mid-September	US Pro Championships; Forest Hills, United States	(Czechoslovakia) Koželuh / Richards; 5–7, 6–1, 6–3, 6–1	(United States) Kinsey / (United States) Johnson				
Mid-September	South of England Championship; Eastbourne, United Kingdom	(New Zealand) Eskell Andrews; 6–4, 3–6, 6–4	(United Kingdom) Keats Lester	(United Kingdom) Elsie Goldsack; 8–6, 2–6, 6–3	(British Raj) Jenny Sandison		
Mid-September	South of England Championship; Eastbourne, United Kingdom	(New Zealand) Andrews / (United Kingdom) Sharpe; 3–6, 6–2, 10–8	(United Kingdom) Lester / (United Kingdom) Peters	(United Kingdom) Harvey / (United Kingdom) Mudford; 6–3, 6–4	Manser / Tyrrel	(Japan) Miki / (United Kingdom) Mudford; 8–6, 6–3	(United Kingdom) Sharpe / (United Kingdom) Heeley
Mid-September	Coupe Porée; Coupe Georges Gouttenoire (ladies); Coupe Jacques Leféburre (mixed); Paris, France	(France) Jean Borotra; 7–5, 6–3, 9–7	(France) Christian Boussus	(France) Simonne Mathieu; 7–5, 6–3	(Weimar Republic) Ilse Friedleben		
Mid-September	Baden-Baden Championship; Baden-Baden, Weimar Republic	(France) René de Buzelet; 6–2, 0–6, 2–6, 6–3, ret.	(Weimar Republic) Otto Froitzheim	(France) Simonne Mathieu; 7–5, 6–2	(Weimar Republic) Ilse Friedleben		
Mid-September	Baden-Baden Championship; Baden-Baden, Weimar Republic	(France) Buzelet / (France) Boussus; 6–3, 6–1, 6–2	(Weimar Republic) Buss / (France) Thurneyssen	(France) Mathieu / (France) Barbier; 6–3, 6–4	(Weimar Republic) Friedleben / (Weimar Republic) Reznicek	(France) Buzelet / (Weimar Republic) Friedleben; 6–3, 2–6, 6–4	(France) Boussus/ (Weimar Republic) Reznicek
September -28	Pacific Southwest tournament Los Angeles, United States	(United States) John Doeg; 8-10, 7–5, 8–6, 8–6	(United States) John Van Ryn	(United Kingdom) Betty Nuthall; 8–6, 7–5	(United States) Anna McCune Harper		
September -28	North of England Championships; Scarborough, United Kingdom	(United Kingdom) Charles Kingsley; 7-9, 6–1, 6–1, 6–4	(United Kingdom) Keats Lester	(United Kingdom) Joan Fry	(United Kingdom) Dorothy Anderson		

== October ==
- The France Davis Cup team lost to Japan in the latter's homeland.
- The French won the annual France-England covered court meeting in Queen's Club. Apart from the official programme the highlight was a Borotra-Tilden match, which also booked a French victory.
- Kay Lund was crowned German junior champion.
- The English amateurs beat the pros six to three.

Month	Event	Men		Women		Mixed	
Month	Event	Champions	Runner-up	Champions	Runner-up	Champions	Runner-up
October 5-	Mexican Championships; Mexico City, Mexico	(United States) John Van Ryn; 6–3, 4–6, 6–1, 6–8, 6–4	(United States) Ben Gorchakoff	Williams; 7–5, 7–5	(United States) Gladman	(United States) Van Ryn / (United States) Gladman; 9–7, 6–2	(United States) Hall / (United States) Cross
October 14–22	British Covered Court Championships; Not known, Not known	(France) Jacques Brugnon; 7–5, 6–2, 6–2	(United Kingdom) Nigel Sharpe	(United Kingdom) Peggy Michell; 6–4, 6–4	(United Kingdom) Joan Ridley		
October 14–22	British Covered Court Championships; Not known, Not known	(United Kingdom) Crole-Rees / (United Kingdom) Eames; 6–1, 1–6, 4–6, 8–6, 7–5	(United Kingdom) Peters / (United Kingdom) Wheatley			(United Kingdom) Crole-Rees / (United Kingdom) Michell; 6–1, 6–3	(United Kingdom) Wheatley / (United Kingdom) Mrs. Lycett
October	Meran Championships; Merano, Italy	(France) Emanuelle du Plaix; 6–3, 2–6, 6–4, 6–l	(Austria) Franz Wilhelm Matejka	(Weimar Republic) Ilse Friedleben; 3 wins (round robin format)	(Weimar Republic) Toni Schomburgk		
October	Meran Championships; Merano, Italy	Open Championships (United Kingdom) Pat Hughes; 6–1, 6–1, 4–6, 1–6, 9–7	(Austria) Hermann Artens	(Weimar Republic) Toni Schomburgk straight sets	Kallmeyer		
October	Meran Championships; Merano, Italy	(Hungary) Kehrling / (Weimar Republic) Froitzheim; 2–6, 6–4, 6–3, 4–6, 11-9	(United Kingdom) Hughes / (United Kingdom) Lee	(Weimar Republic) Schomburgk / Fritsch; 7–5, 6–0	(Weimar Republic) Rost / (Weimar Republic) Friedleben	(Weimar Republic) Kuhlmann / (Weimar Republic) Schomburgk; 10-8, 6–4	(United Kingdom) Hughes / (Italy) Levi

== November ==
Month	Event	Men		Women		Mixed	
Month	Event	Champions	Runner-up	Champions	Runner-up	Champions	Runner-up
Early November	Mitre Cup; Rio de Janeiro, Brazil	Champion Argentina 5–0	Runner-up Brazil				
November 3–10	Spanish International Championship; Barcelona, Spain	(France) Christian Boussus; 6-4, 6-2, 3-6, 7- 5	(Netherlands) Hendrik Timmer	(Netherlands) Madzy Rollin Couquerque; 6-1, 1-6, 8-6	(France) Ida Adamoff		
November 3–10	Spanish International Championship; Barcelona, Spain	(Spain) Sindreu / (Spain) Maier; 6-3, 6-3, 6-4	(France) Boussus / (France) du Plaix	(France) Besnerais / (France) Adamoff; 8-6, 6-4	(Netherlands) Couquerque / Fabra	(France) Boussus / (France) Besnerais; 6-8, 6-1, 6-3	(Netherlands) Timmer / (Netherlands) Couquerque
November 5–11	Argentine International Championship; Buenos Aires, Argentina	(Argentina) Guillermo Robson; 2–6, 7–5, 6–2, 1–6, 8–6	(Spain) Manuel Alonso Areizaga	MacKinnon; 5–7, 7–5, 6–2	Rendtorff		
Late November	Queen's Club Covered Courts Championships; London, United Kingdom	(United Kingdom) Fred Perry; 3–6, 6–4, 6–2	(United Kingdom) Keats Lester	(United Kingdom) Joan Ridley; 6–3, 6–3	(United Kingdom) Effie Hemmant		
Late November	Queen's Club Covered Courts Championships; London, United Kingdom	(United States) Tilden / (United Kingdom) Kingsley; 9–7, 6–2, 6–3	(United Kingdom) Eames / (United Kingdom) Wheatcroft	Not known	Not known	(United Kingdom) Perry / List; 3–6, 7–5, 7–5	(United Kingdom) Harris / (United Kingdom) Ridley
Late November	Swiss Covered Courts Championships; Zurich, Switzerland	(Switzerland) Jean Wuarin; 6–1, 6–1, 6–4	(Switzerland) Boris Maneff	Trolliet; 6–3, 3–6, 6–4	Duvillad		
Late November	Swiss Covered Courts Championships; Zurich, Switzerland	(Switzerland) Wuarin / (Switzerland) Férrier n 6–4, 6–4	Joubet / Favre	Not known	Not known	Trolliet / Peloux; 6–2, 6–4	Drumond / Schweetver

== December ==
- World-ranked German Davis Cup player Hans Moldenhauer died in a motor accident.
- US player Fred Inman died of illness.
- Suzanne Lenglen retired from tennis.

Month	Event	Men		Women		Mixed	
Month	Event	Champions	Runner-up	Champions	Runner-up	Champions	Runner-up
December -14	Hidalgo Cup; Mexico City, Mexico	Champion Mexico 3–2	Runner-up Cuba				

== Rankings ==
These are the rankings compiled and published by Helen Wills Moody, world number one female player in March and A. Wallis Myers founder of the International Lawn Tennis Club of Great Britain in September.

=== Men's singles ===
Wills' singles rankings, as of March 1929
#	Player
1	Henri Cochet (FRA)
2	René Lacoste (FRA)
3	Bill Tilden (USA)
4	Jean Borotra (FRA)
5	Francis Hunter (USA)

Myers' singles rankings, as of September 1929
#	Player
1	Henri Cochet (FRA)
2	René Lacoste (FRA)
3	Jean Borotra (FRA)
4	Bill Tilden (USA)
5	Francis Hunter (USA)
6	George Lott (USA)
7	John Doeg (USA)
8	John Van Ryn (USA)
9	Bunny Austin (GBR)
10	Umberto De Morpurgo (ITA)
11	Christian Boussus (FRA)
12	Pierre Henri Landry (FRA)
13	Yoshiro Ohta (JPN)
14	Colin Gregory (GBR)
15	Daniel Prenn (GER)
16	Hans Moldenhauer (GER)

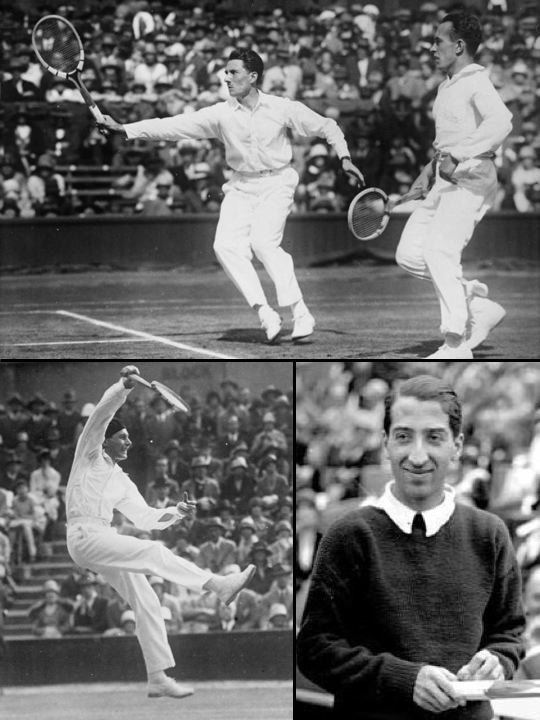
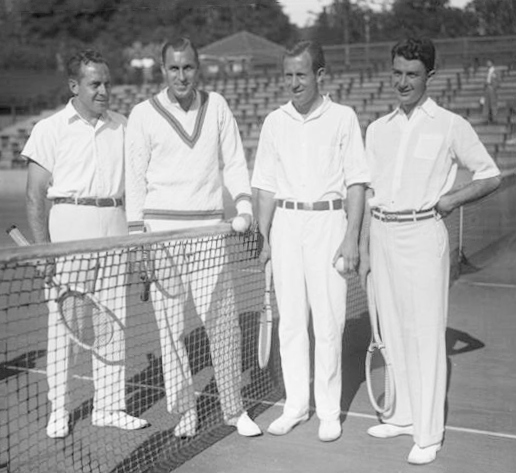
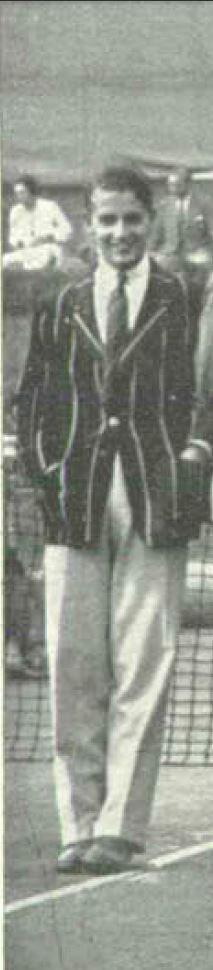
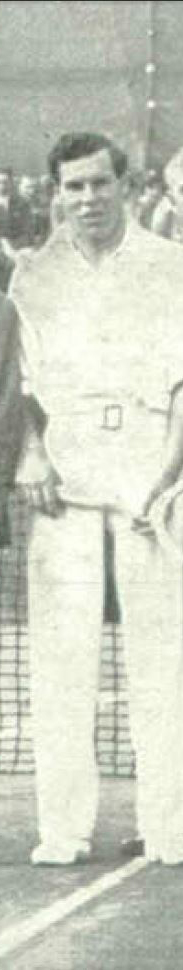
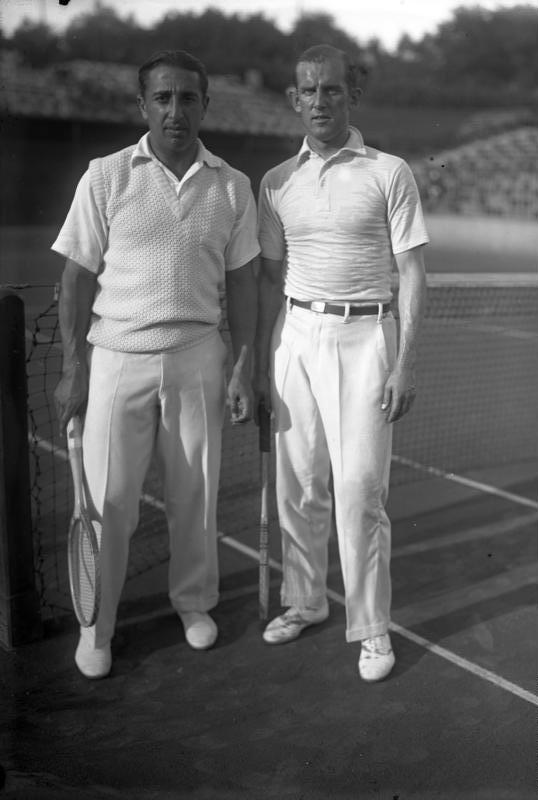
Cochet (1), (Brugnon), Borotra (3), Lacoste (2), Hunter (5), Tilden (4), (Allison), van Ryn (8), Austin (9), Gregory (14), Prenn (15), Moldenhauer (16)

=== Women's singles ===
Myers' singles rankings, as of September 1929
#	Player
1	Helen Wills Moody (USA)
2	Phoebe Holcroft Watson (GBR)
3	Helen Jacobs (USA)
4	Betty Nuthall (GBR)
5	Bobbie Heine (RSA)
6	Simonne Mathieu (FRA)
7	Eileen Bennett (GBR)
8	Paula von Reznicek (GER)
9	Peggy Michell (GBR)
10	Elsie Goldsack (GBR)
11	Jenny Sandison (British India)
12	Doris Metaxa (FRA)
13	Edith Cross (GBR)
14	Mary Heeley (GBR)

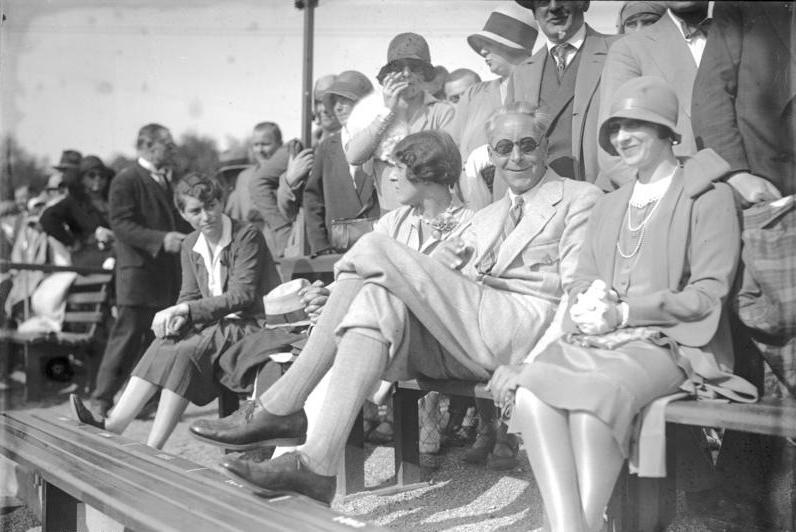
Right to left:Wills (1) and von Reznicek (8)

== Notes ==
- ^{a} ^{b} George Lyttleton-Rogers was an Irish player but the rules of the Butler Trophy and Nations Cup required players to be of the same nationality thus Rogers represented Great Britain on those two occasions.
- ^{c} Due to constant rain the South of France tournament was postponed to March and this year it was merged with the annual Parc Imperial L.T.C. de Nice tournament.
- ^{d} Jon Henderson of The Guardian incorrectly dates the match to 1930. The record was broken in the 1984 Central Fidelity Banks International by Jean Hepner and Vicki Nelson-Dunbar with 643 shots.
- ^{e} Lo Sport Fascista switches the results of Sanremo and Bordighera. It is apparent in their chronological order and match outcomes.

== Works cited ==
=== Online media ===
- "1929 Australian Championships". australianopen.com. Melbourne: Tennis Australia. Archived from the original on 2014-07-14.
- "Tennis New Zealand Roll of Honor". tennisnz.com. Tennis New Zealand. p. 14.
- "1920–1929". vdt-tennis.de (in German). Essen, Germany: Verband Deutscher Tennislehrer (Association of German tennis coaches). Archived from the original on 14 July 2014.
- "Cuadro de Honor" [Roll of Honor] (PDF) (in Spanish). Barcelona, Spain: Real Federación Española de Tenis.
- Smith, Phillip S. (2013). "From Club Court to Center Court;The Evolution of Professional Tennis in Cincinnati" (PDF). White Plains, New York, United States: United States Tennis Association.
- "Hall of Famers – Wilfred Baddeley". International Tennis Hall of Fame. Archived from the original on 2014-07-14.

=== Books ===
- Hereng, Jacques; De Veene, Carlos (2004). De ongelofelijke successtory van tennis in België [The story of the incredible success of tennis in Belgium]. Tielt, Belgium: Lannoo Uitgeverij. pp. 152–155. ISBN 9789020955972.
- Nauright, John (2012). Sports around the World. Santa Barbara, United States: ABC-CLIO. p. 214. ISBN 9781598843019.
- Moss, Major T (1949). Lawn Tennis. London, United Kingdom: Allen & Unwin. pp. 112.
- Gillmeister, Heiner (1998). Tennis: A Cultural History. London, United Kingdom: Bloomsbury Publishing. pp. 255–259. ISBN 9781441171016.
- Wallis Myers, A., ed. (1930). Ayers' Lawn Tennis Almanack 1930. London, United Kingdom: F.H. Ayers Ltd.

=== Periodicals ===
==== Tennisz és Golf ====
- Béla Kehrling, ed. (1929). "1929 season" [International news] (PDF). Tennisz és Golf (in Hungarian). I. Budapest, Hungary: Bethlen Gábor írod. és Nyomdai Rt.
  - "Külföldi hírek" [International news] (PDF) (1). May 10, 1929: 14–16.
  - "Külföldi hírek" [International news] (PDF) (2). May 25, 1929: 41, 43, 48, 50, 51.
  - "A francia nemzetközi bajnokságok Párisban" [The French International Championships in Paris] (PDF) (3). June 10, 1929: 65–68, 80.
  - "Külföldi hírek" [International news] (PDF) (4). June 25, 1929: 104, 106–107.
  - "Külföldi hírek" [International news] (PDF) (5). July 10, 1929.
  - "Külföldi hírek" [International news] (PDF) (6). July 25, 1929.
  - "Külföldi hírek" [International news] (PDF) (7). August 10, 1929.
  - "Külföldi hírek" [International news] (PDF) (8). August 25, 1929.
  - "A MAC nemzetközi bajnokságai" [The International Championships] (PDF) (9). September 10, 1929.
  - "Tennisz és golf" (PDF) (10). September 25, 1929.
  - "Tennisz és golf" (PDF) (11). October 10, 1929.
  - "Tennisz és golf" (PDF) (12). October 25, 1929.
  - "Külföldi hírek" [International news] (PDF) (13). November 10, 1929.
  - "Tennisz és golf" (PDF) (15–16). December 25, 1929.

==== The Straits Times ====
- "1929 season". The Straits Times. Singapore, Straits Settlements. 1929.
  - "11th successive victory" (29,075). April 29, 1929: 13.
  - "Champions again" (29,075). 26 February 1930: 13.
  - "Woman without a country". 22 August 1929: 13.
  - "Tennis player's motor accident" (12,912). 31 December 1929: 9.
  - "Indian Tennis Star". September 19, 1929: 5.

==== Le Figaro ====
  - "Tennis" (316). November 11, 1928: 5.
  - "Tennis" (366). December 31, 1928: 5.
- François Coty, ed. (1929). "1929 season". Le Figaro (in French). Paris, France. ISSN 0182-5852.
  - "Tennis" (1). January 1, 1929: 5.
  - "Tennis" (2). January 2, 1929: 4.
  - "Tennis" (3). January 3, 1929: 5.
  - "Tennis" (11). January 11, 1929: 7.
  - "Tennis" (15). January 15, 1929: 5.
  - "Tennis" (21). January 21, 1929: 5.
  - "Tennis" (22). January 22, 1929: 5.
  - "Tennis" (27). January 27, 1929: 5.
  - "Tennis" (28). January 28, 1929: 4.
  - "Tennis" (29). January 29, 1929: 6.
  - "Tennis" (31). January 31, 1929: 6.
  - "Tennis" (36). February 5, 1929: 6.
  - "Tennis" (37). February 6, 1929: 5.
  - "Tennis" (38). February 7, 1929: 5.
  - "Tennis" (40). February 9, 1929: 5.
  - "W.T. Tilden est requalifié" [W.T. Tilden is requalified] (41). February 10, 1929: 5.
  - "Tennis" (43). February 12, 1929: 5.
  - "Tennis" (44). February 13, 1929: 4.
  - "Tennis" (45). February 14, 1929: 7.
  - "Tennis" (46). February 15, 1929: 7.
  - "Tennis" (47). February 16, 1929: 6.
  - "Tennis" (56). February 25, 1929: 5.
  - "Tennis" (57). February 26, 1929: 6.
  - "Tennis" (59). February 28, 1929: 6.
  - "Tennis" (64). March 5, 1929: 6.
  - "Tennis" (65). March 6, 1929: 6.
  - "Tennis" (66). March 7, 1929: 5.
  - "Tennis" (70). March 11, 1929: 6.
  - "Tennis" (71). March 12, 1929: 6.
  - "Tennis" (72). March 13, 1929: 5.
  - "Tennis" (73). March 14, 1929: 5.
  - "Tennis" (78). March 19, 1929: 7.
  - "Tennis" (79). March 20, 1929: 5.
  - "Tennis" (84). March 25, 1929: 9.
  - "Tennis" (85). March 26, 1929: 9.
  - "Tennis" (86). March 27, 1929: 9.
  - "Tennis" (91). April 1, 1929: 6.
  - "Tennis" (92). April 2, 1929: 6.
  - "Tennis" (94). April 4, 1929: 6.
  - "Tennis" (98). April 8, 1929: 6.
  - "Tennis" (99). April 9, 1929: 9.
  - "Tennis" (100). April 10, 1929: 6.
  - "Tennis" (120). April 30, 1929: 9.
  - "Tennis" (124). May 4, 1929: 11.
  - "Tennis" (142). May 22, 1929: 11.
  - "Tennis" (149). May 29, 1929: 10.
  - "Tennis" (169). June 18, 1929: 8.
  - "Tennis" (172). June 21, 1929: 10.
  - "Tennis" (175). June 24, 1929: 7.
  - "Tennis" (204). July 23, 1929: 7.
  - "Les dix meilleurs jouers de tennis du monde" [The best ten players of the world] (262). September 19, 1929: 8.
  - "Tennis" (261). September 18, 1929: 8.

==== Le Petit Niçois ====
- Albert Lejeune, ed. (1929). "1929 season". Le Petit Niçois (in French). 50.
  - "Tennis sur la Côte d'Azur" [Tennis at the Côte d'Azur] (1). January 1, 1929: 3.
  - "Tennis sur la Côte d'Azur" [Tennis at the Côte d'Azur] (8). January 8, 1929: 3.
  - "Tennis sur la Côte d'Azur" [Tennis at the Côte d'Azur] (64). March 5, 1929: 2. Archived from the original on December 24, 2013.
  - "Tennis sur la Côte d'Azur" [Tennis at the Côte d'Azur] (65). March 6, 1929: 2.

==== The Singapore Free Press ====
- "1929 season". The Singapore Free Press and Mercantile Advertiser. Singapore, Straits Settlements: Mohammed Eunos. 1929.
  - "strenuous tennis match" (12,686). April 8, 1929: 4.
  - "N. of England lawn tennis titles" (12,833). September 28, 1929: 13.

==== Other ====
- "English Tennis". The Argus (23,817). Melbourne: 10. June 15, 1929.
- "U.S. Canada divide honors in tennis". The Brownsville Herald (23,817). Brownsville, Texas, United States: 32. January 27, 1929.
- "Tennis Titles Change". New Zealand Truth (1,206). Wellington, New Zealand: 14. 10 January 1929.
- "Cannes tournament". The Sydney Morning Herald. 98 (28,398): 12. 10 January 1929.
- "Lawn Tennis". The Sydney Morning Herald. 98 (28,443): 15. 4 March 1929.
- "Hunter Wins Florida Title" (PDF). The Advocate (70). Burnie, Tasmania, Australia: 7. 11 March 1919.
- "Tennis sur la Côte d'Azur" [Tennis at the Côte d'Azur]. L'Éclaireur (in French). 48 (69). Nice, France: Agençe Havas: 6. 10 March 1929.
- "Miss Blake tennis champion". Escanaba Daily Press. XX (288). Escanaba, United States: 15. 17 March 1929.
- "Mercur, Hall win". Escanaba Daily Press. XXI (7). Escanaba, United States: 12. July 11, 1929.
- "De Stefani vittorioso a Bordighera" [De Stefani victorious in Bordighera] (PDF). La Stampa (in Italian). 63 (66). Turin, Italy: 4. 17 March 1929.
- Henderson, Jon (27 March 2005). "Two thousand strokes – one point". The Guardian. London, United Kingdom. ISSN 0261-3077.
- "Rachette italiane sulla riviera" [Tennis on the Italian Riviera]. Lo Sport Fascista (in Italian). II (4). Milan, Italy: Lando Ferretti: 100. April 1929.
- "Lawn-Tennis". Le Gaulois (in French). 64 (18,793). Paris, France: 6. 20 March 1929.
- "Lawn-Tennis". Le Gaulois (in French). 64 (18,795). Paris, France: 6. 22 March 1929.
- "Edgar Brown holds on to tennis crown" (PDF). New York Age. 42 (51). New York City, United States: 6. 31 August 1929. OCLC 9274417.
- "Tennis sur la Côte d'Azur" [Tennis at the Côte d'Azur]. L'Éclaireur (in French). 48 (112). Nice, France: Agençe Havas: 2. 22 April 1929.
- "Tennis sur la Côte d'Azur" [Tennis at the Côte d'Azur]. L'Éclaireur (in French). 48 (118). Nice, France: Agençe Havas: 2. 28 April 1929.
- "Les championnats nattionaux à Lucerne" [National Championships in Luzern] (PDF). Feuille d'Avis de Neuchâtel (in French). 191 (143). Neuchâtel, Switzerland: 4. 24 June 1929.
- "Tournoi international à Montreux" [International Championships in Montreux] (PDF). Feuille d'Avis de Neuchâtel (in French). 191 (221). Neuchâtel, Switzerland: 4. 23 September 1929.
- "Lawn-tennis" (PDF). Feuille d'Avis de Neuchâtel (in French). 191 (197). Neuchâtel, Switzerland: 4. 26 August 1929.
- "Une nouvelle étoile du tennis nous vient de l'Inde" [New tennis star arrives here from India] (PDF). L'Impartial (in French). 49 (14,816). La Chaux-de-Fonds, Switzerland: 1. 2 May 1929.
- "Scottish Tennis". Aberdeen Journal. 22 July 1929 – via British Newspaper Archive.
- "Jack Wright Tennis Champion Defeats Frank Shields". Winnipeg Tribune: 12. July 29, 1929.
- "Jack Wright No. 1 Player Capture Canadian Tennis Title". The Kansas City Star. Kansas City, Missouri, United States: 77. July 28, 1929.
- "Big Bill Tilden Beats George Lott". Santa Cruz Evening News. 44 (92). Santa Cruz, California, United States: Devlin and Judah Co.: 1 July 28, 1929. OCLC 40192810.
- "Description of Finals in Pacific Tennis Meet Given by Greeley Man". Greeley Daily Tribune. XXII (68). Greeley, Colorado, United States: 9. October 9, 1929. OCLC 13073246.
- "Best players" (pdf). The Canberra Times. 3 (481): 4. May 3, 1929.
- "La semana deportiva" [The week in sports]. Blanco y Negro (in Spanish). 39 (2008). Madrid, Spain: 71. 10 November 1929.
- "Tennis". A Noite (in Portuguese). 20 (6821). Rio de Janeiro, Brazil: 10. 20 November 1930.
- "Frederick C. Inman, Retired broker, dies". The New York Times. December 1929.
- "Lenglen a. saleslady in paris dress shop". The New York Times. December 1929.
- "Mexico's net team keeps Hidalgo cup". The New York Times. December 1929.
- "Kent Championships". Western Morning News (21,598). 7 June 1929 – via British Newspaper Archive.
- "Professional Tennis Championships". Dundee Courier (((23,758))/21, 351): 7. 27 July 1929 – via British Newspaper Archive.
- "Kozeluh wins French tennis title". Dundee Courier (((23,590))/21, 183): 7. 2 January 1929 – via British Newspaper Archive.
- "Lawn tennis". Yorkshire Post and Leeds Intelligencer (25,519): 19. 29 April 1929 – via British Newspaper Archive.
- "Irish Championships results". Dundee Courier (((23,753))/21, 346): 9. 22 July 1929 – via British Newspaper Archive.
- "Tennis". Western Daily Press. 143 (23,931): 3. 22 July 1929 – via British Newspaper Archive.
