= 1930 French Championships – Women's singles =

Women's singles
- 1930 French Championships

Final
- Champion: (United States) Helen Wills Moody
- Runner-up: (United States) Helen Jacobs
- Score: 6–2, 6–1

Details
- Draw: 43
- Seeds: 8

Events
Singles	men	women
Doubles	men	women
← 1929 ·	French Championships	· 1931 →

Helen Moody defeated Helen Jacobs 6–2, 6–1 in the final to win the women's singles tennis title at the 1930 French Championships.

== Seeds ==
The seeded players are listed below. Helen Moody is the champion; others show the round in which they were eliminated.

1. (United States) Helen Moody (champion)
2. (United Kingdom) Phoebe Holcroft Watson (quarterfinals)
3. (France) Simonne Mathieu (quarterfinals)
4. (Germany) Cilly Aussem (semifinals)
5. (United States) Elizabeth Ryan (quarterfinals)
6. (Spain) Lilí Álvarez (semifinals)
7. (United States) Helen Jacobs (finalist)
8. (United Kingdom) Eileen Bennett (second round)

== Draw ==
=== Key ===
- Q = Qualifier
- WC = Wild card
- LL = Lucky loser
- r = Retired

=== Finals ===
Quarterfinals
1	(United States) Helen Moody	6	6
(Germany) Irmgard Rost	0	1
4	(Germany) Cilly Aussem	4	6	6
5	(United States) Elizabeth Ryan	6	1	0
6	(Spain) Lilí Álvarez	6	7
3	(France) Simonne Mathieu	3	5
7	(United States) Helen Jacobs	5	6	6
2	(United Kingdom) Phoebe Holcroft Watson	7	3	1

Semifinals
1	(United States) Helen Moody	6	6
4	(Germany) Cilly Aussem	2	1
6	(Spain) Lilí Álvarez	1	0
7	(United States) Helen Jacobs	6	6

Finals
1	(United States) Helen Moody	6	6
7	(United States) Helen Jacobs	2	1

=== Earlier rounds ===
==== Section 1 ====
First round

Second round
1	(United States) Moody	6	6
(France) Neufeld	0	0
(United Kingdom) Mudford	6	6
(France) Adamoff	2	3
8	(United Kingdom) Bennett
(France) Golding
(Germany) Rost
(United Kingdom) Satterthwaite

Third round
1	(United States) Moody	6	6
(United Kingdom) Mudford	2	4
(France) Golding	5	2
(Germany) Rost	7	6

Quarterfinals
1	(United States) Moody	6	6
(Germany) Rost	0	1

==== Section 2 ====
First round
(France) Kleinadel	8	6
(France) Amaury	6	1
5	(United States) Ryan	6	10
(France) Desloge	2	8
(France) Charpenel	1	6	1
(France) Bordes	6	4	6
(France) Henrotin
Vaananem
(France) Barbier	7	9
(France) Lebesnerais	5	7

Second round
4	(Germany) Aussem	6	6
(France) Bernard	4	3
(Belgium) Sigart	6	6
(France) Kleinadel	1	1
5	(United States) Ryan	6	6
(France) Bordes	1	3
Vaananem	2	1
(France) Barbier	6	6

Third round
4	(Germany) Aussem	6	6
(Belgium) Sigart	3	4
5	(United States) Ryan	6	6
(France) Barbier	1	2

Quarterfinals
4	(Germany) Aussem	4	6	6
5	(United States) Ryan	6	1	0

==== Section 3 ====
First round
(France) Metaxa
(France) Charnelet
(France) Danet	1	3
(Germany) Friedleben	6	6
(Germany) Peitz	6	6
(France) Gallay	4	4
De Oberschall	0	1
6	(Spain) Lilí Álvarez	6	6
(Denmark) Stockel	6	6
(France) De Montebello	4	1
(France) Anet	6	5	0
(United Kingdom) Owen	4	7	6

Second round
(France) Charnelet	2	5
(Germany) Friedleben	6	7
(Germany) Peitz	4	4
6	(Spain) Lilí Álvarez	6	6
(Denmark) Stockel	5	0
(United Kingdom) Owen	7	6
(France) Berthet	2	1
3	(France) Mathieu	6	6

Third round
(Germany) Friedleben	5	6	3
6	(Spain) Lilí Álvarez	7	3	6
(United Kingdom) Owen	2	2
3	(France) Mathieu	6	6

Quarterfinals
6	(Spain) Lilí Álvarez	6	7
3	(France) Mathieu	3	5

==== Section 4 ====
First round

Second round
(France) Meunier	6	3
(Switzerland) Payot	8	6
(France) Vaussard	0	0
7	(United States) Jacobs	6	6
(France) Peyre	2	4
(Germany) Krahwinkel	6	6
(France) Guillier	4	2
2	(United Kingdom) Holcroft-Watson	6	6

Third round
(Switzerland) Payot	0	2
7	(United States) Jacobs	6	6
(Germany) Krahwinkel	4	2
2	(United Kingdom) Holcroft-Watson	6	6

Quarterfinals
7	(United States) Jacobs	5	6	6
2	(United Kingdom) Holcroft-Watson	7	3	1

Preceded by 1930 Australian Championships – Women's singles	Grand Slam women's singles	Succeeded by 1930 Wimbledon Championships – Women's singles
