= 1928 French Championships – Women's singles =

Women's singles
- 1928 French Championships

Final
- Champion: (United States) Helen Wills
- Runner-up: (United Kingdom) Eileen Bennett
- Score: 6–1, 6–2

Details
- Draw: 37
- Seeds: 8

Events
Singles	men	women
Doubles	men	women
← 1927 ·	French Championships	· 1929 →

First-seeded Helen Wills defeated Eileen Bennett 6–1, 6–2 in the final to win the women's singles tennis title at the 1928 French Championships. The draw consisted of 37 players of which 8 were seeded.

== Seeds ==
The seeded players are listed below. Helen Wills is the champion; others show the round in which they were eliminated.

1. (United States) Helen Wills (champion)
2. (France) Suzanne Devé (second round)
3. (Netherlands) Kea Bouman (semifinals)
4. (Australia) Daphne Akhurst (quarterfinals)
5. (France) Elisabeth Macready (second round)
6. (Spain) Lilly De Alvarez (first round)
7. (France) Marguerite Bordes (third round)
8. (United Kingdom) Eileen Bennett (finalist)

== Draw ==
=== Key ===
- Q = Qualifier
- WC = Wild card
- LL = Lucky loser
- r = Retired

=== Finals ===
Quarterfinals
1	(United States) Helen Wills	6	6
(Netherlands) Madzy Rollin Couquerque	2	0
4	(Australia) Daphne Akhurst	8	2
(United Kingdom) Cristobel Hardie	10	6
(France) J. Vaussard	0	0
3	(Netherlands) Kea Bouman	6	6
8	(United Kingdom) Eileen Bennett	6	7	7
(United States) Penelope Anderson	3	9	5

Semifinals
1	(United States) Helen Wills	6	6
(United Kingdom) Cristobel Hardie	1	1
3	(Netherlands) Kea Bouman	2	6
8	(United Kingdom) Eileen Bennett	6	8

Finals
1	(United States) Helen Wills	6	6
8	(United Kingdom) Eileen Bennett	1	2

=== Earlier rounds ===
==== Section 1 ====
First round

Second round
1	(United States) Wills	6	6
(France) Marcou	0	3
(Germany) Aussem	3	7	6
(United States) Watson	6	5	0
(France) Beauge	5	6	4
(Netherlands) Couquerque	7	4	6
(Netherlands) Lycett	2	2
7	(France) Bordes	6	6

Third round
1	(United States) Wills	6	6
(Germany) Aussem	1	2
(Netherlands) Couquerque	10	6
7	(France) Bordes	8	2

Quarterfinals
1	(United States) Wills	6	6
(Netherlands) Couquerque	2	0

==== Section 2 ====
First round
(United Kingdom) Fry	2	6	6
(France) Neufeld	6	0	2
(France) Golding
(France) Peyre
5	(France) Macready
(France) Wolfson
(Australia) O'Hara Wood	10	6
(France) Barbier	8	3
(United Kingdom) Hardie	6	6
(France) Gallay	2	4
(France) Kleinadel	3	4
(France) Henrotin	6	6

Second round
(France) Amaury	1	1
4	(Australia) Akhurst	6	6
(United Kingdom) Fry	6	6	6
(France) Peyre	8	2	1
5	(France) Macready	3	3
(Australia) O'Hara Wood	6	6
(United Kingdom) Hardie	6	4	6
(France) Henrotin	3	6	4

Third round
4	(Australia) Akhurst	6	6
(United Kingdom) Fry	1	1
(Australia) O'Hara Wood	6	4
(United Kingdom) Hardie	8	6

Quarterfinals
4	(Australia) Akhurst	8	2
(United Kingdom) Hardie	10	6

==== Section 3 ====
First round
(France) Vaussard
(France) Grasset
(France) Fourcade
6	(Spain) De Alvarez
(United Kingdom) Nuthall	9	7
(France) Lebesnerais	7	5
(France) Wyns-Speranza
(France) Charnelet
(United States) Mallory	6	6
(France) Le Conte	0	2

Second round
(France) Vaussard	6	6
(France) Fourcade	3	2
(United Kingdom) Nuthall	4	4
(France) Charnelet	6	6
(United States) Mallory	6	0	4
(Australia) Boyd	3	6	6
(United Kingdom) Colyer	3	2
3	(Netherlands) Bouman	6	6

Third round
(France) Vaussard	7	6
(France) Charnelet	5	3
(Australia) Boyd	6	1	2
3	(Netherlands) Bouman	4	6	6

Quarterfinals
(France) Vaussard	0	0
3	(Netherlands) Bouman	6	6

==== Section 4 ====
First round

Second round
(United States) Julie Anthony	6
(Netherlands) Canters	4	r
(France) Bourgeois	6	2	1
8	(United Kingdom) Bennett	3	6	6
(France) Conquet	1	2
(Australia) Bickerton	6	6
(United States) Anderson
2	(France) Deve

Third round
(United States) Julie Anthony	0	2
8	(United Kingdom) Bennett	6	6
(Australia) Bickerton	3	14	1
(United States) Anderson	6	12	6

Quarterfinals
8	(United Kingdom) Bennett	6	7	7
(United States) Anderson	3	9	5

Preceded by 1928 Australian Championships – Women's singles	Grand Slam women's singles	Succeeded by 1928 Wimbledon Championships – Women's singles
