= Irmgard Rost =

German tennis player and author

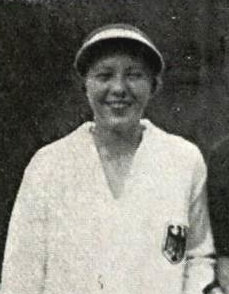
- Rost in Rio de Janeiro (1931)
- Country (sports): Weimar Republic
- Born: 1909
- Died: 1970 (aged 60–61)
- Plays: Right-handed

Grand Slam singles results
- French Open: QF (1930)
- Wimbledon: 2R (1928, 1929)

Grand Slam doubles results
- French Open: QF (1929, 1930)
- Wimbledon: 2R (1928)

Grand Slam mixed doubles results
- French Open: 2R (1929, 1930)
- Wimbledon: 2R (1929)

Irmgard Rost (1909 – 1976), was a German tennis player active in the 1920s and 1930s.

She competed at the Wimbledon Championships in 1928 and 1929. Her best result in singles was reaching the second round in 1928, where she was defeated by fifth-seed and eventual finalist Helen Jacobs. At the 1929 French Championships, she was seeded eighth. After victories in the first rounds against Colette Rosambert and Elsie Goldsack Pittman, she lost in the third round to Sylvie Jung Henrotin. At the 1930 French Championships, she was unseeded but reached the quarterfinals, where she was defeated by top-seed and eventual champion Helen Wills Moody.

Rost was a singles runner-up at the 1931 German Championships in Hamburg, losing the final in straight sets to defending champion and compatriot Cilly Aussem. In February 1929, Rost won the singles title at the German Indoor Championships in Bremen after a three-sets win in the final against Ilse Friedleben.

In 1931, she went on a tennis tour to Argentina, Brazil and Chile with Cilly Aussem. At the Argentine Open, she was runner-up to Aussem.
