= San Francisco City Championships =

Tournament information
- Tour: USTA Circuit (1901–1922); ILTF World Circuit (1923–1972); ILTF Independent Circuit (1973–1977); Northern California TA Circuit (1978–present)
- Founded: 1901; 125 years ago
- Venue: California Tennis Club (1901–1929); Golden Gate Park (1930–2018); Dolores Park (2019–present)
- Surface: Hard / outdoor

The San Francisco City Championships is a men's and women's tennis tournament founded in 1901. It first was played at the California Tennis Club, San Francisco, United States, and then staged annually at various locations until 2019 when it moved to Dolores Park.

== History ==
The San Francisco City Tournament was inaugurated in 1901 and played at the California Tennis Club the first winner of the singles men's singles competition was George Whitney who defeated Robert Whitney. In the early days of the event a challenge round was in operation, meaning the previous year's winner did not play in the all comers main draw instead they met a challenger in final.

In 1910 a women's singles competition was added to the schedule and the first winner was Ida Mearns who defeated Annabelle Vodden. Until 1945 it was played in a best of five sets format then switched to best of three. In 1930 the event was moved to the Golden Gate Park tennis center until 2018 when it was moved to Dolores Park due to refurbishment of the Golden Gate Park venue.

The tournament was part of the Northern California LTA circuit, and sub circuit of the USNLTA Circuit until 1922. In 1923 after the United States Tennis Association joined the International Lawn Tennis Federation it became an open event on the ILTF World Circuit until 1969 for men and 1972 for women. In 1973 it became part of the ILTF Independent Circuit (those tournaments not part of men's Grand Prix Circuit or women's WTA Tour) until 1977. In 1978 it was further downgraded to a local regional event under the auspices of the Northern California Tennis Association.
