= ILTF World Open Circuit =

Historical tennis circuit

Details
- Duration: 1913–1972 (58 seasons)
- Categories: ILTF World Championships (1913-1923); ILTF Grand Slams (1924-1969); ILTF Africa (1915-69); ILTF Asia (1915-69); ILTF Australasia (1913-69); ILTF Central America & Caribbean (1923-69); ILTF Europe (1913-69); ILTF North America (1914-69); ILTF South America (1920-69)

Achievements (singles)

The ILTF World Open Circuit or ILTF International Circuit or ILTF World Circuit was the definitive, globally centralized network of amateur and early professional tennis tournaments administered by the International Lawn Tennis Federation (ILTF) between 1913 and 1969 for 56 seasons it was the worldwide top-tier circuit for amateur players. Also simply called the ILTF Circuit, it was established to unify international playing regulations and standardize tournament structures. The circuit functioned as an interlocking grid of major national championships, regional tournament "swings," and team competitions like the Davis Cup and Federation Cup. Rather than acting as a direct day-to-day promoter, the ILTF operated the circuit through a sophisticated governance structure anchored by its Management Committee and its functional sub-committees, most notably the ILTF Calendar Committee and its global-regional subsidiary circuits.

Following the creation of the ILTF Grand Prix Circuit in 1970 all 20 events on that circuit were previously events on this circuit. By 1973 of the 72 tournaments on the Grand Prix circuit nearly all of them were former ILTF World Circuit events, from that year onward that circuit became known as the ILTF Independent Circuit more events from this tour eventually became Grand Prix events. However by 1989 it had only 10 events remaining before it was discontinued.

The circuit was characterized by its strictly enforced amateur guidelines during its first 55 years, during which players traveled via stipends (flights, accommodation, meals, local transport expense vouchers provided and paid for by sovereign national lawn tennis associations (LTAs). The Calendar Committee acted as the central macro-liaison, harmonizing calendar dates submitted by the national federations to completely eliminate scheduling overlaps. This rigid structural template provided a predictable, sequential itinerary that allowed legendary figures like Margaret Court, Rod Laver, and Maria Bueno to travel globally across continuous regional geographical circuits.

Following the advent of the Open Era in 1968, the ILTF World Circuit transformed to accommodate commercialized prize money. Faced with the threat of private, rogue corporate promoter led circuits like World Championship Tennis (WCT), the ILTF utilized its Calendar Committee to engineer the ILTF Grand Prix Circuit in 1970. This defensive initiative established the foundational hierarchy of point-vetted tournament grading and year-end championship pools that would eventually evolve into the modern ATP Tour and WTA Tour frameworks by the early 1990s.

== History ==
=== The Imperial Era and LTA Dominance (Pre-1913) ===
Before a unified world federation existed, international tennis operated under a decentralized, imperial model. Following the sport's codification, Great Britain’s Lawn Tennis Association (LTA)—founded in 1888—became the de facto global governing body. Because the LTA was the custodian of the universal rules and hosted the definitive grass-court championship at Wimbledon, foreign associations looked to London to dictate playing standards and equipment regulations. No overarching body managed a tour; individual clubs hosted local matches, and players moved at their own discretion within the bounds of British-codified amateur rules.

=== The Rebellion and Formation of the ILTF (1911–1913) ===
By the early 1910s, deep resentment grew among international administrators over Great Britain's singular control. The movement to break the British LTA monopoly was catalyzed by two key international figures: Charles Duane Williams, a Geneva-based American lawyer, and Count Henri de Baillet-Latour, an influential Belgian sports administrator.

In October 1911, Williams wrote directly to Henri Wallet, the president of the French tennis organization, proposing an international tournament in Paris to establish a world championship on clay courts, specifically designed to rival Wimbledon's self-appointed status as the sole "World Championship" on grass. Williams’ concept directly led to the staging of the inaugural World Hard Court Championships in Paris in 1912. The organizing committee for this event used the momentum to coordinate a wider rebellion. Though Duane Williams died aboard the RMS Titanic in April 1912, the administrative push survived. On March 1, 1913, delegates from 12 national associations gathered in Paris to officially strip the British LTA of its solo rule and establish the International Lawn Tennis Federation (ILTF).

=== Unification and Centralized Control (1913–1924) ===
Despite the creation of the ILTF, true global harmony remained elusive. To secure the British LTA's cooperation during the 1913 launch, the new federation conceded immense residual privileges to London: the ILTF initially granted Wimbledon the permanent, perpetual right to host the official "World Grass Court Championships." This overt favoritism infuriated the United States National Lawn Tennis Association (USNLTA), which staged a decade-long boycott of the federation.

The deadlock was broken in 1923. The United States finally agreed to integrate its domestic calendar under a historic compromise where the ILTF permanently abolished the title of "World Championships." By 1924, the ILTF was formally granted sole control over world tennis. This institutional unification effectively consolidated oversight of the global tournament calendar. Rather than physically operating local schedules, the ILTF acted as the ultimate macro-liaison, locking in the chronological sequence of the newly designated "Official Championships" (the Australian, French, Wimbledon, and US tournaments) to form a unified structural grid.

=== The Engine Room: The ILTF Management Committee and Calendar Committee ===
The highly organized nature of the pre-1970 amateur tennis circuit was driven by a sophisticated administrative pipeline. At the top sat the ILTF Management Committee, which oversaw the sport's global administration. To handle specialized logistical burdens, it operated through functional sub-committees, the most vital of which was the ILTF Calendar Committee.

The Calendar Committee had responsibility for the scheduling of world wide tennis tournaments. Its explicit mandate was to liaise directly with the sovereign national LTAs to evaluate the events they wished to stage. The committee’s primary utility lay in resolving the "overlap problem." By actively harmonizing tournament dates, the committee ensured that major national championships and regional tournament blocks never conflicted with one another.

This fixed, non-overlapping calendar grid was the exact mechanism that made global itineraries possible. Without the Calendar Committee enforcing this sequential structure, legendary players like Margaret Court could never have mapped out their international travel on the world circuit. Because the global schedule was rigidly locked in months in advance, players could arrange long-distance transit across continents, moving seamlessly from the Australian summer circuit to the Caribbean circuits, through the European clay-court season, and onto the British and American grass-court swings.

=== Definitive Proof of Macro-Scheduling: The ILTF vs. IOC Olympic Clash (1924–1928) ===
The structural reality of this global events grid is definitively proven by the fierce geopolitical turf war that erupted between the ILTF and the International Olympic Committee (IOC) in the mid-1920s. When the IOC finalized dates for the Summer Olympic Games, the event timeline created direct calendar collisions with the tightly packed summer windows required for Wimbledon and the Davis Cup.The ILTF Calendar Committee fiercely protected its template; when the IOC requested that the ILTF temporarily alter or suspend its national majors during Olympic years to clear the calendar, the ILTF flatly refused.

The conflict escalated into a battle for supreme authority over the sport. The ILTF demanded the absolute right to nominate all Olympic tennis entrants and manage the tournaments under its own rules. The IOC—led by Count Henri de Baillet-Latour, who now fiercely defended Olympic sovereignty—refused to yield. Following the 1924 Paris Games, the ILTF flexed its structural monopoly. Defending the sovereignty of its calendar grid, the ILTF withheld all player entries for the 1928 Amsterdam Olympic Games. Realizing they could not stage a legitimate tournament without the ILTF-sanctioned framework, the IOC dropped tennis from the Olympic program entirely, starting a 64-year Olympic exile.

=== The Crisis of the Open Era and the Grand Prix Circuit ===
The Calendar Committee's role shifted drastically from a regulatory gatekeeper to an active crisis-management task force with the arrival of the Open Era in 1968. When the amateur barrier fell, wealthy private promoters like Lamar Hunt’s World Championship Tennis (WCT) aggressively signed top players to exclusive contracts, creating rogue, competing tournament schedules that threatened to render traditional ILTF events obsolete. To fight back against private commercial takeovers, the ILTF mobilized its Calendar Committee. Under the leadership of British tennis administrator Derek Hardwick, the committee was utilized as the vehicle to design and implement a defensive unified infrastructure: The ILTF Grand Prix Circuit. Archival records from the era verify that the sub-committee tasked with engineering this counter-strategy consisted of Ben Barnett, Robert Abdesselam, R.B. Colwell, and John Harrison, operating directly alongside Hardwick under the umbrella of the Calendar Committee.

They structured a system where independent tournaments were graded by importance, prestige, and prize money. Crucially, they introduced a centralized bonus pool to reward players who consistently competed in ILTF-sanctioned events rather than defecting to rogue pro troupes. As validated by Stan Smith in historical accounts of his victory at the inaugural 1970 year-end Masters Grand Prix in Tokyo, it was Hardwick’s ILTF calendar committee that spent 10 grueling months organizing the infrastructure, securing Pepsi-Cola as the title sponsor, and carving out the dates necessary to launch the circuit's crown jewel. This Grand Prix system under the Calendar Committee's conduct successfully stabilized the sport, establishing the unified, point-vetted weekly calendar that would eventually evolve into the modern ATP Tour and WTA Tour.

== Seasons ==
=== Men's ===
- 1929 ILTF Mens Tennis Circuit
- 1930 ILTF Men's Tennis Circuit
- 1931 ILTF Men's Tennis Circuit
- 1967 ILTF Men's Tennis Circuit
- 1969 ILTF Men's Tennis Circuit

=== Women's ===
- 1929 ILTF Women's Tennis Circuit
- 1930 ILTF Women's Tennis Circuit
- 1931 ILTF Women's Tennis Circuit
- 1969 ILTF Women's Tennis Circuit
- 1970 ILTF Women's Tennis Circuit
- 1971 ILTF Women's Tennis Circuit
- 1972 ILTF Women's Tennis Circuit

== See also ==
- ILTF Grand Prix Circuit
- ILTF Women's International Grand Prix Circuit

== Sources ==
=== Books and Journals ===
- Barrett, John (2014). Wimbledon: The Official History. London: Vision Sports Publishing. ISBN 978-1909534230.
- Court, Margaret (1975). Court on Court: A Life in Tennis. New York: Dodd, Mead & Co. ISBN 978-0396071983.
- Gillmeister, Heiner (1998). Tennis: A Cultural History. London: Leicester University Press. ISBN 978-0718501471.
- Lake, Robert J. (2015). A Social History of Tennis in Britain. London: Routledge. ISBN 978-0415714310.
- Mallon, Bill; Heijmans, Jeroen (2011). Historical Dictionary of the Olympic Movement (4th ed.). Lanham, Maryland: Scarecrow Press. ISBN 978-0810872493.
- Olympika: (2015) The International Journal of Olympic Studies, Volume 24. International Centre for Olympic Studies (ICOS). Western University. London, Ontario, Canada.
- Metzler, Paul (1975). Tennis Styles and Stylists. Great Neck, New York: Book Horizons. ISBN 978-0824401870.

=== Newspapers ===
- The New York Times (March 2, 1913). New York City, New York. "Tennis Federation Bars United States; International Body Formed in Paris Without Representatives of This Country."
- The Times (March 31, 1968). London, England. "ILTF Votes Unanimously to End Amateur Barrier; 12 Open Tournaments Approved for 1968 Season."

=== Online Sources ===
- ATP Tour News: "Stan Smith: The First Champion" – An archival feature article where Stan Smith details the 10-month administrative effort led by Derek Hardwick and the ILTF calendar committee to stage the historic inaugural 1970 Masters tournament in Tokyo.
- University of Southampton Research Repository: "Women's Sporting Lives: A biographical study of elite amateur tennis players at Wimbledon" – Doctoral thesis by sports historian Janine van Someren examining the highly organized geographical circuits and structural realities managed by national LTAs under the early ILTF framework.
