= Barbara Margaret Trimble =

British novelist (1921–1995)

- Born: 21 February 1915; Holyhead, Anglesey, Wales, United Kingdom of Great Britain and Ireland
- Died: 12 November 1995 (aged 80)
- Occupation: Novelist
- Writing career
- Pen name: Margaret Blake, B. M. Gill, Barbara Gilmour
- Language: English
- Period: 1967–1991
- Genres: Crime, thriller, and romance

Barbara Margaret Trimble (née Gill; 15 or 21 February 1921 – 12 November 1995) was a British writer of more than 20 crime, thriller and romance novels between 1967 and 1991, under the names of Margaret Blake, B. M. Gill and Barbara Gilmour.

== Life ==
Barbara Margaret Gill was born in Holyhead, Anglesey, Wales; her father was Irish and her mother was Welsh.

Trimble was nominated twice for an Edgar Award for Best Novel, in 1985 (for The Twelfth Juror) and in 1988 (for Nursery Crimes).

She died in 1995.

== Bibliography ==
=== As Margaret Blake ===
==== Single novels ====
- Stranger at the Door (1967)
- Bright Sun, Dark Shadow (1968)
- The Rare and the Lovely (1969)
- The Elusive Exile (1971)
- Courier to Danger (1973)
- Flight from Fear (1973)
- Apple of Discord (1975)
- Walk Softly and Beware (1977)

=== As B. M. Gill ===
==== Single novels ====
- Target Westminster (1977)
- Death Drop (1979)
- The Twelfth Juror (1984)
- Nursery Crimes (1986)
- Dying to Meet You (1988)
- Time and Time Again (1989)

==== Inspector Maybridge Series ====
1. Victims (1980) (US title: Suspect)
2. Seminar for Murder (1985)
3. The Fifth Rapunzel (1991)

=== As Barbara Gilmour ===
==== Single novels ====
- You Can't Stay Here (1968)
- Pattern of Loving (1969)
- Threads of Fate (1971)
- Question the Wind (1973)
