= 1930 French Championships (tennis) =

- Date: 24 May – 1 June 1930
- Edition: 35th
- Category: 6th Grand Slam (ITF)
- Surface: Clay
- Location: Paris (XVI^{e}), France
- Venue: Stade Roland Garros

Champions

Men's singles
- (France) Henri Cochet

Women's singles
- (United States) Helen Wills Moody

Men's doubles
- (France) Henri Cochet / (France) Jacques Brugnon

Women's doubles
- (United States) Helen Wills Moody / (United States) Elizabeth Ryan

Mixed doubles
- (Germany) Cilly Aussem / (United States) Bill Tilden
- Seniors over 40 singles (Germany) Otto Froitzheim
← 1929 ·	French Championships	· 1931 →

The 1930 French Championships (now known as the French Open) was a tennis tournament that took place on the outdoor clay ourts at the Stade Roland-Garros in Paris, France. The tournament ran from 24 May until 1 June. It was the 35th staging of the French Championships and the second Grand Slam tournament of the year. Henri Cochet and Helen Wills Moody won the singles titles.

== Finals ==
=== Men's singles ===
(France) Henri Cochet defeated (United States) Bill Tilden 3–6, 8–6, 6–3, 6–1

=== Women's singles ===
(United States) Helen Wills Moody defeated (United States) Helen Jacobs 6–2, 6–1

=== Men's doubles ===
(France) Henri Cochet / (France) Jacques Brugnon defeated (Australia) Harry Hopman / (Australia) Jim Willard 6–3, 9–7, 6–3

=== Women's doubles ===
(United States) Helen Wills Moody / (United States) Elizabeth Ryan defeated (France) Simone Barbier / (France) Simonne Mathieu 6–3, 6–1

=== Mixed doubles ===
(Germany) Cilly Aussem / (United States) Bill Tilden defeated (United Kingdom) Eileen Bennett Whittingstall / (France) Henri Cochet 6–4, 6–4

=== Seniors over 40 singles ===
(Germany) Otto Froitzheim defeated (France) François Blanchy 6-0, 6-4

Preceded by 1930 Australian Championships	Grand Slams	Succeeded by 1930 Wimbledon Championships
