= Marcou =

Marcou is a surname. Notable people with the surname include:

- Alex Marcou (born 1958), Australian rules footballer
- James Marcou (born 1988), American ice hockey player
- Jules Marcou (1824–1898), French, Swiss, and American geologist

== See also ==
- Marcos (given name)
