= Ilse Friedleben =

German tennis player

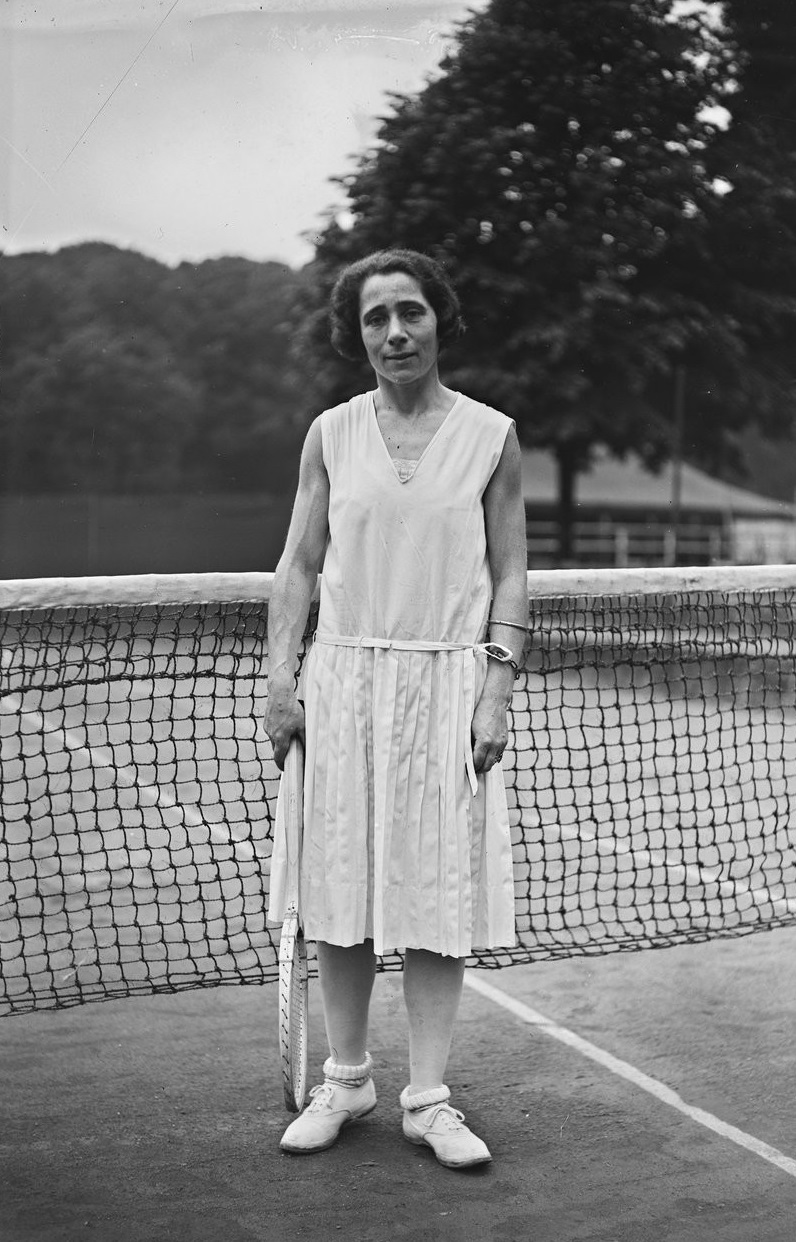
- Country (sports): Germany
- Born: 2 September 1893 Frankfurt am Main, Germany
- Died: December 1963 (aged 70) London, United Kingdom
- Plays: Right-handed

Singles

Grand Slam singles results
- French Open: 3R (1927)
- Wimbledon: 1R (1927, 1929)

Doubles

Grand Slam doubles results
- French Open: 2R (1927, 1929)
- Wimbledon: 1R (1927)

Grand Slam mixed doubles results
- French Open: QF (1930)

Ilse Friedleben (German pronunciation: [ˈɪlzə ˈfʁiːtleːbm̩], née Weihermann; 2 September 1893 – December 1963) was a German female tennis player who was active until the beginning of the 1930s.

== Biography ==
Friedleben was born under her maiden name Weihermann in Frankfurt am Main on 2 September 1893. Along with her sisters Toni and Anna, she played field hockey at the SC Frankfurt 1880 as well as tennis at the TC Palmengarten. In the years before World War I, Ilse and her sister Toni were among the best German female tennis players.

After the war, the first years of the Weimar Republic became Friedleben's most successful years. In between 1920 and 1926, she won the German Championships at Hamburg six times, only being defeated once by Nelly Neppach in 1925.

In 1927, the year the International Lawn Tennis Federation lifted the ban on German players on international tournaments, the time of her dominance seemed to come to an end. Although she reached the final at Hamburg again, she was beaten by emerging 18-year-old Cilly Aussem. In the same year, Aussem took her place at the top of the German tennis ranking. She played at Wimbledon in 1927 and 1929, but saw her first round exit in each year. Still at the 1927 French Championships, she reached the quarterfinals, losing to Dutch Kea Bouman, the eventual champion, in three sets. Her last triumph was her German title in 1932, a year when Aussem didn't participate due to an illness.

In Spring 1933, Friedleben was still ranked fifth on national level. After the Nazi Party had seized power in Germany in January, German tennis clubs began to expel Jewish members. In April, the German tennis association announced that Jewish players would no longer be allowed to play for Germany in international tournaments. Friedleben, who was of Jewish faith, fled to Switzerland in the same month. From then, only little is known of her life. She is said to have worked as a teacher in Switzerland after World War II. She died in London in December 1963.
