= Eileen Bennett =

British film actress (1919–2025)

- Born: Eileen Jessie Mary Bennett; 8 July 1919; London, England
- Died: 9 March 2025 (aged 105); Washington, D.C., US
- Occupations: Actress, model
- Years active: 1939–1943
- Spouse: Thomas West Hammond Jr. (m. 1945; died 1970)
- Children: 2, including Nicholas Hammond

Eileen Jessie Mary Bennett (8 July 1919 – 9 March 2025) was a British film and West End stage actress who was active in the industry in the late 1930s and early 1940s. She was the mother of actor Nicholas Hammond.

== Early life ==
Eileen Jessie Mary Bennett was born in London, England on 8 July 1919. She attended the Royal Academy of Dramatic Art and started her career as a model.

== Film career ==
Bennett made her uncredited screen debut in the 1939 film The Outsider. Later that year, she played Eve in the thriller Trunk Crime. 1939 also saw her deputise as a television announcer for Jasmine Bligh when she was on leave. Bennett was described as "Britain's new screen star" in 1942. She had significant roles in the comedy Much Too Shy (1942) and Thursday's Child (1943).

== Personal life and death ==
Bennett married Thomas West Hammond Jr. during World War II in July 1945. He died from a heart attack in 1970. The couple had two sons: David Hammond, and actor Nicholas Hammond. Bennett turned 100 on 8 July 2019, and she died in Washington, D.C. on 9 March 2025, at the age of 105.

== Filmography ==
Year	Title	Role
1939	The Outsider	Uncredited
1939	Q Planes	Uncredited
1939	The Gang's All Here	Cigarette seller
1939	Trunk Crime	Eve
1939	Cæsar's Friend (TV movie)	Marcella
1941	He Found a Star	Sleepy
1942	Back-Room Boy	Uncredited
1942	Breach of Promise	Uncredited
1942	Much Too Shy	Jackie Somers
1943	Thursday's Child	Phoebe Wilson
