= Simone Barbier =

French tennis player

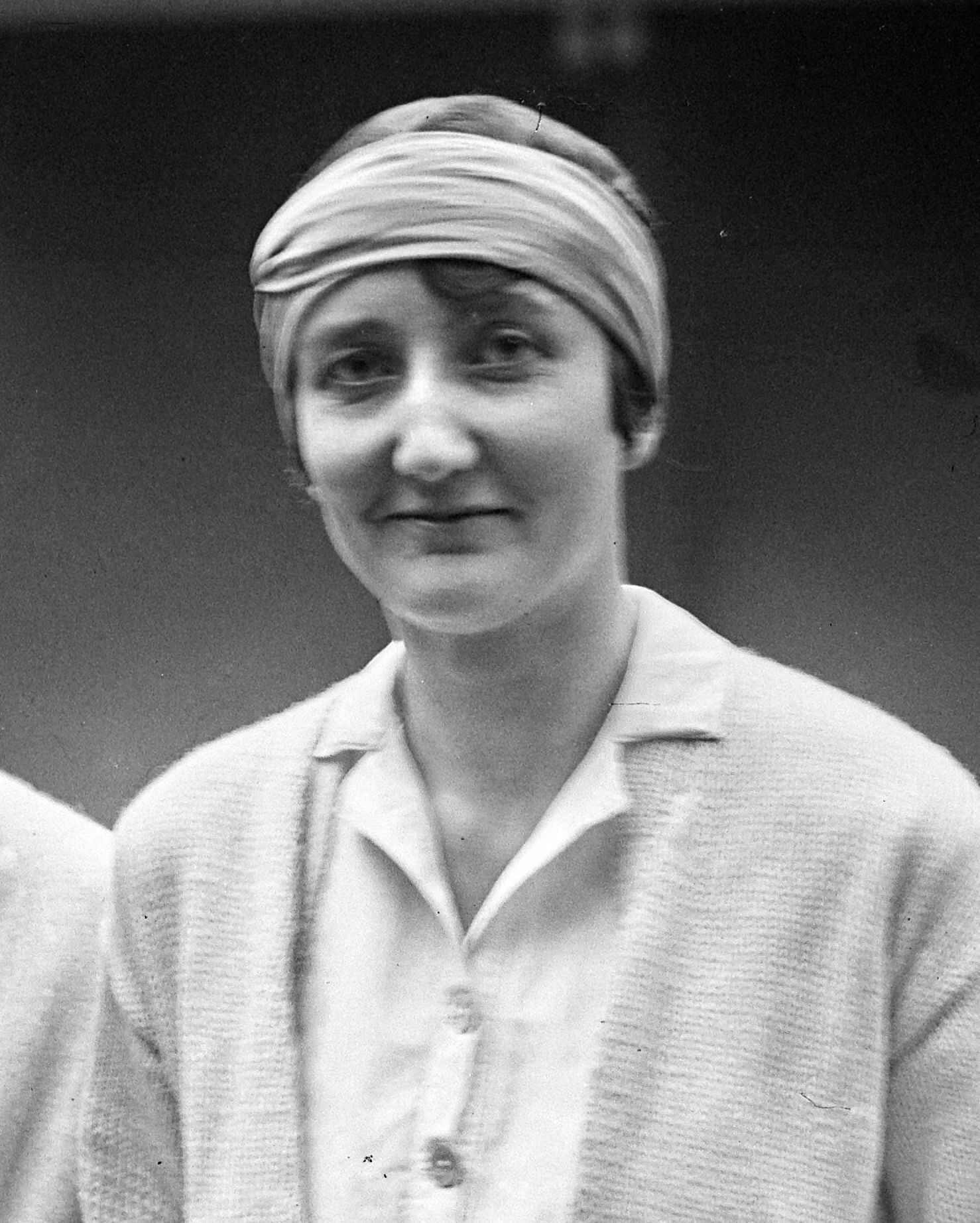
- Country (sports): France
- Born: 19 January 1903; Nancy, France
- Died: 23 September 1992 (aged 89); La Celle-Saint-Cloud, France

Singles

Grand Slam singles results
- French Open: 3R (1927, 1930, 1938)
- Wimbledon: 2R (1929, 1930)

Doubles

Grand Slam doubles results
- French Open: F (1930)
- Wimbledon: QF (1930)

Grand Slam mixed doubles results
- French Open: QF (1929)
- Wimbledon: 3R (1930)

Simone Barbier (19 January 1903 – 23 September 1992) was a French tennis player.

She reached the doubles final at the 1930 French Championships with compatriot Simonne Mathieu in which they lost in straight sets to Elizabeth Ryan and Helen Wills Moody. In 1929 and 1930 she competed in the Wimbledon Championships, reaching the second round in singles, the quarterfinal in doubles with Mathieu and the second round in mixed doubles partnering Jacques Grandguillot.

Barbier won the doubles title at the covered courts championships of Belgium and France.

She said her favorite stroke was the smash but her most successful stroke was the forehand drive to the opponent's backhand corner.

== Grand Slam finals ==
=== Doubles: (1 runner-up) ===
Result	Year	Championship	Surface	Partner	Opponents	Score
Loss	1930	French Championships	Clay	(France) Simonne Mathieu	(United States) Elizabeth Ryan (United States) Helen Wills Moody	3–6, 1–6
