= List of Wimbledon mixed doubles champions =

Wimbledon Mixed Doubles Champions
- Location: London; United Kingdom
- Venue: AELTC
- Governing body: AELTC / LTA
- Created: 1913
- Surface: Grass
- Prize money: £ 128,000 (2023)
- Website: wimbledon.com

Most titles
- Amateur era: 7: Elizabeth Ryan
- Open era: 4: Martina Navratilova; Leander Paes

Most consecutive titles
- Amateur era: 5: Doris Hart
- Open era: 2: Billie Jean King; Owen Davidson; Wendy Turnbull; Helena Suková; Cyril Suk; Desirae Krawczyk; Neal Skupski

Current champion
- Marcelo Arévalo; Jeļena Ostapenko

This is a list of the champions and runners-up of the Wimbledon Championships Mixed Doubles tournament, first introduced to the championship in 1913. From 1915 to 1918, and from 1940 to 1945, no competition was held due to the two World Wars.

From 1888, the "All England" mixed doubles championship was held during the Northern Championships (at Manchester or Liverpool).

== Finalists ==
=== Amateur Era ===
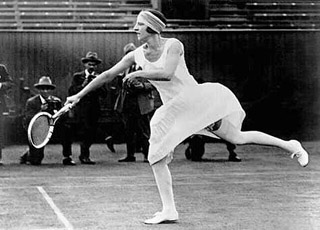
Suzanne Lenglen won the mixed doubles competition on three occasions.

| Year | Champions | Runners-up | Score |
|---|---|---|---|
| 1913 | (United Kingdom) Hope Crisp (United Kingdom) Agnes Tuckey | (United Kingdom) James Cecil Parke (United Kingdom) Ethel Larcombe | 3–6, 5–3 retired |
| 1914 | (United Kingdom) James Cecil Parke (United Kingdom) Ethel Larcombe | (New Zealand) Anthony Wilding (France) Marguerite Broquedis | 4–6, 6–4, 6–2 |
| 1915 | No competition (due to World War I) | | |
| 1916 | No competition (due to World War I) | | |
| 1917 | No competition (due to World War I) | | |
| 1918 | No competition (due to World War I) | | |
| 1919 | (United Kingdom) Randolph Lycett (United States) Elizabeth Ryan | (United Kingdom) Albert Prebble (United Kingdom) Dorothea Lambert Chambers | 6–0, 6–0 |
| 1920 | (Australia) Gerald Patterson (France) Suzanne Lenglen | (United Kingdom) Randolph Lycett (United States) Elizabeth Ryan | 7–5, 6–3 |
| 1921 | (United Kingdom) Randolph Lycett (2) (United States) Elizabeth Ryan (2) | (United Kingdom) Max Woosnam (United Kingdom) Phyllis Howkins | 6–3, 6–1 |
| 1922 | (Australia) Pat O'Hara Wood (France) Suzanne Lenglen (2) | (United Kingdom) Randolph Lycett (United States) Elizabeth Ryan | 6–4, 6–3 |
| 1923 | (United Kingdom) Randolph Lycett (3) (United States) Elizabeth Ryan (3) | (India) Lewis Deane (United Kingdom) Dorothy Shepherd-Barron | 6–4, 7–5 |
| 1924 | (United Kingdom) Brian Gilbert (United Kingdom) Kitty McKane | (United Kingdom) Leslie Godfree (United Kingdom) Dorothy Shepherd-Barron | 6–3, 3–6, 6–3 |
| 1925 | (France) Jean Borotra (France) Suzanne Lenglen (3) | (Italy) Uberto de Morpurgo (United States) Elizabeth Ryan | 6–3, 6–3 |
| 1926 | (United Kingdom) Leslie Godfree (United Kingdom) Kitty Godfree (2) | (United States) Howard Kinsey (United States) Mary Browne | 6–3, 6–4 |
| 1927 | (United States) Francis Hunter (United States) Elizabeth Ryan (4) | (United Kingdom) Leslie Godfree (United Kingdom) Kitty Godfree | 8–6, 6–0 |
| 1928 | (South Africa) Pat Spence (United States) Elizabeth Ryan (5) | (Australia) Jack Crawford (Australia) Daphne Akhurst | 7–5, 6–4 |
| 1929 | (United States) Francis Hunter (2) (United States) Helen Moody | (United Kingdom) Ian Collins (United Kingdom) Joan Fry | 6–1, 6–4 |
| 1930 | (Australia) Jack Crawford (United States) Elizabeth Ryan (6) | (Germany) Daniel Prenn (Germany) Hilde Krahwinkel Sperling | 6–1, 6–3 |
| 1931 | (United States) George Lott (United States) Anna Harper | (United Kingdom) Ian Collins (United Kingdom) Joan Ridley | 6–3, 1–6, 6–1 |
| 1932 | (Spain) Enrique Maier (United States) Elizabeth Ryan (7) | (Australia) Harry Hopman (Belgium) Josane Sigart | 7–5, 6–2 |
| 1933 | (Germany) Gottfried von Cramm (Germany) Hilde Krahwinkel | (South Africa) Norman Farquharson (United Kingdom) Mary Heeley | 7–5, 8–6 |
| 1934 | (Japan) Ryuki Miki (United Kingdom) Dorothy Round | (United Kingdom) Bunny Austin (United Kingdom) Dorothy Shepherd-Barron | 3–6, 6–4, 6–0 |
| 1935 | (United Kingdom) Fred Perry (United Kingdom) Dorothy Round (2) | (Australia) Harry Hopman (Australia) Nell Hopman | 7–5, 4–6, 6–2 |
| 1936 | (United Kingdom) Fred Perry (2) (United Kingdom) Dorothy Round (3) | (United States) Don Budge (United States) Sarah Fabyan | 7–9, 7–5, 6–4 |
| 1937 | (United States) Don Budge (United States) Alice Marble | (France) Yvon Petra (France) Simonne Mathieu | 6–4, 6–1 |
| 1938 | (United States) Don Budge (2) (United States) Alice Marble (2) | (Germany) Henner Henkel (United States) Sarah Palfrey Cooke | 6–1, 6–4 |
| 1939 | (United States) Bobby Riggs (United States) Alice Marble (3) | (United Kingdom) Frank Wilde (United Kingdom) Nina Brown | 9–7, 6–1 |
| 1940 | No competition (due to World War II) | | |
| 1941 | No competition (due to World War II) | | |
| 1942 | No competition (due to World War II) | | |
| 1943 | No competition (due to World War II) | | |
| 1944 | No competition (due to World War II) | | |
| 1945 | No competition (due to World War II) | | |
| 1946 | (United States) Tom Brown (United States) Louise Brough | (Australia) Geoff Brown (United States) Dorothy Bundy | 6–4, 6–4 |
| 1947 | (Australia) John Bromwich (United States) Louise Brough (2) | (Australia) Colin Long (Australia) Nancye Bolton | 1–6, 6–4, 6–2 |
| 1948 | (Australia) John Bromwich (2) (United States) Louise Brough (3) | (Australia) Frank Sedgman (United States) Doris Hart | 6–2, 3–6, 6–3 |
| 1949 | (South Africa) Eric Sturgess (South Africa) Sheila Summers | (Australia) John Bromwich (United States) Louise Brough | 9–7, 9–11, 7–5 |
| 1950 | (South Africa) Eric Sturgess (2) (United States) Louise Brough (4) | (Australia) Geoff Brown (United States) Patricia Todd | 11–9, 1–6, 6–4 |
| 1951 | (Australia) Frank Sedgman (United States) Doris Hart | (Australia) Mervyn Rose (Australia) Nancye Bolton | 7–5, 6–2 |
| 1952 | (Australia) Frank Sedgman (2) (United States) Doris Hart (2) | (Argentina) Enrique Morea (Australia) Thelma Long | 4–6, 6–3, 6–4 |
| 1953 | (United States) Vic Seixas (United States) Doris Hart (3) | (Argentina) Enrique Morea (United States) Shirley Fry | 9–7, 7–5 |
| 1954 | (United States) Vic Seixas (2) (United States) Doris Hart (4) | (Australia) Ken Rosewall (United States) Margaret duPont | 5–7, 6–4, 6–3 |
| 1955 | (United States) Vic Seixas (3) (United States) Doris Hart (5) | (Argentina) Enrique Morea (United States) Louise Brough | 8–6, 2–6, 6–3 |
| 1956 | (United States) Vic Seixas (4) (United States) Shirley Fry | (United States) Gardnar Mulloy (United States) Althea Gibson | 2–6, 6–2, 7–5 |
| 1957 | (Australia) Mervyn Rose (United States) Darlene Hard | (Australia) Neale Fraser (United States) Althea Gibson | 6–4, 7–5 |
| 1958 | (Australia) Bob Howe (Australia) Lorraine Coghlan | (Denmark) Kurt Nielsen (United States) Althea Gibson | 6–3, 13–11 |
| 1959 | (Australia) Rod Laver (United States) Darlene Hard (2) | (Australia) Neale Fraser (Brazil) Maria Bueno | 6–4, 6–3 |
| 1960 | (Australia) Rod Laver (2) (United States) Darlene Hard (3) | (Australia) Bob Howe (Brazil) Maria Bueno | 13–11, 3–6, 8–6 |
| 1961 | (Australia) Fred Stolle (Australia) Lesley Turner Bowrey | (Australia) Bob Howe (Germany) Edda Buding | 11–9, 6–2 |
| 1962 | (Australia) Neale Fraser (United States) Margaret duPont | (United States) Dennis Ralston (United Kingdom) Ann Haydon | 2–6, 6–3, 13–11 |
| 1963 | (Australia) Ken Fletcher (Australia) Margaret Court | (South Africa) Bob Hewitt (United States) Darlene Hard | 11–9, 6–4 |
| 1964 | (Australia) Fred Stolle (2) (Australia) Lesley Turner (2) | (Australia) Ken Fletcher (Australia) Margaret Court | 6–4, 6–4 |
| 1965 | (Australia) Ken Fletcher (2) (Australia) Margaret Court (2) | (Australia) Tony Roche (Australia) Judy Tegart | 12–10, 6–3 |
| 1966 | (Australia) Ken Fletcher (3) (Australia) Margaret Court (3) | (United States) Dennis Ralston (United States) Billie Jean King | 4–6, 6–3, 6–3 |
| 1967 | (Australia) Owen Davidson (United States) Billie Jean King | (Australia) Ken Fletcher (Brazil) Maria Bueno | 7–5, 6–2 |

=== Open Era ===
| Year | Champions | Runners-up | Score |
|---|---|---|---|
| 1968 | (Australia) Ken Fletcher (4) (Australia) Margaret Court (4) | (Soviet Union) Alex Metreveli (Soviet Union) Olga Morozova | 6–1, 14–12 |
| 1969 | (Australia) Fred Stolle (3) (United Kingdom) Ann Jones | (Australia) Tony Roche (Australia) Judy Tegart | 6–2, 6–3 |
| 1970 | (Romania) Ilie Năstase (United States) Rosemary Casals | (Soviet Union) Alex Metreveli (Soviet Union) Olga Morozova | 6–3, 4–6, 9–7 |
| 1971 | (Australia) Owen Davidson (2) (United States) Billie Jean King (2) | (United States) Marty Riessen (Australia) Margaret Court | 3–6, 6–2, 15–13 |
| 1972 | (Romania) Ilie Năstase (2) (United States) Rosemary Casals (2) | (Australia) Kim Warwick (Australia) Evonne Goolagong Cawley | 6–4, 6–4 |
| 1973 | (Australia) Owen Davidson (3) (United States) Billie Jean King (3) | (Mexico) Raúl Ramírez (United States) Janet Newberry | 6–3, 6–2 |
| 1974 | (Australia) Owen Davidson (4) (United States) Billie Jean King (4) | (United Kingdom) Mark Farrell (United Kingdom) Lesley Charles | 6–3, 9–7 |
| 1975 | (United States) Marty Riessen (Australia) Margaret Court (5) | (Australia) Allan Stone (Netherlands) Betty Stöve | 6–4, 7–5 |
| 1976 | (Australia) Tony Roche (France) Françoise Dürr | (United States) Dick Stockton (United States) Rosemary Casals | 6–3, 2–6, 7–5 |
| 1977 | (South Africa) Bob Hewitt (South Africa) Greer Stevens | (South Africa) Frew McMillan (Netherlands) Betty Stöve | 3–6, 7–5, 6–4 |
| 1978 | (South Africa) Frew McMillan (Netherlands) Betty Stöve | (Australia) Ray Ruffels (United States) Billie Jean King | 6–2, 6–2 |
| 1979 | (South Africa) Bob Hewitt (2) (South Africa) Greer Stevens (2) | (South Africa) Frew McMillan (Netherlands) Betty Stöve | 7–5, 7–6^{(9–7)} |
| 1980 | (United States) John Austin (United States) Tracy Austin | (Australia) Mark Edmondson (Australia) Dianne Fromholtz | 4–6, 7–6^{(8–6)}, 6–3 |
| 1981 | (South Africa) Frew McMillan (2) (Netherlands) Betty Stöve (2) | (United States) John Austin (United States) Tracy Austin | 4–6, 7–6^{(7–2)}, 6–3 |
| 1982 | (South Africa) Kevin Curren (United States) Anne Smith | (United Kingdom) John Lloyd (Australia) Wendy Turnbull | 2–6, 6–3, 7–5 |
| 1983 | (United Kingdom) John Lloyd (Australia) Wendy Turnbull | (United States) Steve Denton (United States) Billie Jean King | 6–7^{(5–7)}, 7–6^{(7–5)}, 7–5 |
| 1984 | (United Kingdom) John Lloyd (2) (Australia) Wendy Turnbull (2) | (United States) Steve Denton (United States) Kathy Jordan | 6–3, 6–3 |
| 1985 | (Australia) Paul McNamee (United States) Martina Navratilova | (Australia) John Fitzgerald (Australia) Elizabeth Smylie | 7–5, 4–6, 6–2 |
| 1986 | (United States) Ken Flach (United States) Kathy Jordan | (Switzerland) Heinz Günthardt (United States) Martina Navratilova | 6–3, 7–6^{(9–7)} |
| 1987 | (United Kingdom) Jeremy Bates (United Kingdom) Jo Durie | (Australia) Darren Cahill (Australia) Nicole Provis | 7–6^{(12–10)}, 6–3 |
| 1988 | (United States) Sherwood Stewart (United States) Zina Garrison | (United States) Kelly Jones (United States) Gretchen Magers | 6–1, 7–6^{(7–3)} |
| 1989 | (United States) Jim Pugh (Czechoslovakia) Jana Novotná | (Australia) Mark Kratzmann (Australia) Jenny Byrne | 6–4, 5–7, 6–4 |
| 1990 | (United States) Rick Leach (United States) Zina Garrison (2) | (Australia) John Fitzgerald (Australia) Elizabeth Smylie | 7–5, 6–2 |
| 1991 | (Australia) John Fitzgerald (Australia) Elizabeth Smylie | (United States) Jim Pugh (Soviet Union) Natasha Zvereva | 7–6^{(7–4)}, 6–2 |
| 1992 | (Czechoslovakia) Cyril Suk (Latvia) Larisa Savchenko Neiland | (Netherlands) Jacco Eltingh (Netherlands) Miriam Oremans | 7–6^{(7–2)}, 6–2 |
| 1993 | (Australia) Mark Woodforde (United States) Martina Navratilova (2) | (Netherlands) Tom Nijssen (Netherlands) Manon Bollegraf | 6–3, 6–4 |
| 1994 | (Australia) Todd Woodbridge (Czech Republic) Helena Suková | (United States) T. J. Middleton (United States) Lori McNeil | 3–6, 7–5, 6–3 |
| 1995 | (United States) Jonathan Stark (United States) Martina Navratilova (3) | (Czech Republic) Cyril Suk (United States) Gigi Fernández | 6–4, 6–4 |
| 1996 | (Czech Republic) Cyril Suk (2) (Czech Republic) Helena Suková (2) | (Australia) Mark Woodforde (Latvia) Larisa Savchenko Neiland | 1–6, 6–3, 6–2 |
| 1997 | (Czech Republic) Cyril Suk (3) (Czech Republic) Helena Suková (3) | (Russia) Andrei Olhovskiy (Latvia) Larisa Savchenko Neiland | 4–6, 6–3, 6–4 |
| 1998 | (Belarus) Max Mirnyi (United States) Serena Williams | (India) Mahesh Bhupathi (Croatia) Mirjana Lučić | 6–4, 6–4 |
| 1999 | (India) Leander Paes (United States) Lisa Raymond | (Sweden) Jonas Björkman (Russia) Anna Kournikova | 6–4, 3–6, 6–3 |
| 2000 | (United States) Donald Johnson (United States) Kimberly Po | (Australia) Lleyton Hewitt (Belgium) Kim Clijsters | 6–4, 7–6^{(7–3)} |
| 2001 | (Czech Republic) Leoš Friedl (Slovakia) Daniela Hantuchová | (United States) Mike Bryan (South Africa) Liezel Huber | 4–6, 6–3, 6–2 |
| 2002 | (India) Mahesh Bhupathi (Russia) Elena Likhovtseva | (Zimbabwe) Kevin Ullyett (Slovakia) Daniela Hantuchová | 6–2, 1–6, 6–1 |
| 2003 | (India) Leander Paes (2) (United States) Martina Navratilova (4) | (Israel) Andy Ram (Russia) Anastasia Rodionova | 6–3, 6–3 |
| 2004 | (Zimbabwe) Wayne Black (Zimbabwe) Cara Black | (Australia) Todd Woodbridge (Australia) Alicia Molik | 3–6, 7–6^{(10–8)}, 6–4 |
| 2005 | (India) Mahesh Bhupathi (2) (France) Mary Pierce | (Australia) Paul Hanley (Ukraine) Tatiana Perebiynis | 6–4, 6–2 |
| 2006 | (Israel) Andy Ram (Russia) Vera Zvonareva | (United States) Bob Bryan (United States) Venus Williams | 6–3, 6–2 |
| 2007 | (United Kingdom) Jamie Murray (Serbia) Jelena Janković | (Sweden) Jonas Björkman (Australia) Alicia Molik | 6–4, 3–6, 6–1 |
| 2008 | (United States) Bob Bryan (Australia) Samantha Stosur | (United States) Mike Bryan (Slovenia) Katarina Srebotnik | 7–5, 6–4 |
| 2009 | (The Bahamas) Mark Knowles (Germany) Anna-Lena Grönefeld | (India) Leander Paes (Zimbabwe) Cara Black | 7–5, 6–3 |
| 2010 | (India) Leander Paes (3) (Zimbabwe) Cara Black (2) | (South Africa) Wesley Moodie (United States) Lisa Raymond | 6–4, 7–6^{(7–5)} |
| 2011 | (Austria) Jürgen Melzer (Czech Republic) Iveta Benešová | (India) Mahesh Bhupathi (Russia) Elena Vesnina | 6–3, 6–2 |
| 2012 | (United States) Mike Bryan (United States) Lisa Raymond (2) | (India) Leander Paes (Russia) Elena Vesnina | 6–3, 5–7, 6–4 |
| 2013 | (Canada) Daniel Nestor (France) Kristina Mladenovic | (Brazil) Bruno Soares (United States) Lisa Raymond | 5–7, 6–2, 8–6 |
| 2014 | (Serbia) Nenad Zimonjić (Australia) Samantha Stosur (2) | (Belarus) Max Mirnyi (Chinese Taipei) Chan Hao-ching | 6–4, 6–2 |
| 2015 | (India) Leander Paes (4) (Switzerland) Martina Hingis | (Austria) Alexander Peya (Hungary) Tímea Babos | 6–1, 6–1 |
| 2016 | (Finland) Henri Kontinen (United Kingdom) Heather Watson | (Colombia) Robert Farah (Germany) Anna-Lena Grönefeld | 7–6^{(7–5)}, 6–4 |
| 2017 | (United Kingdom) Jamie Murray (2) (Switzerland) Martina Hingis (2) | (Finland) Henri Kontinen (United Kingdom) Heather Watson | 6–4, 6–4 |
| 2018 | (Austria) Alexander Peya (United States) Nicole Melichar | (United Kingdom) Jamie Murray (Belarus) Victoria Azarenka | 7–6^{(7–1)}, 6–3 |
| 2019 | (Croatia) Ivan Dodig (Chinese Taipei) Latisha Chan | (Sweden) Robert Lindstedt (Latvia) Jeļena Ostapenko | 6–2, 6–3 |
| 2020 | No competition (due to COVID-19 pandemic) | | |
| 2021 | (United Kingdom) Neal Skupski (United States) Desirae Krawczyk | (United Kingdom) Joe Salisbury (United Kingdom) Harriet Dart | 6–2, 7–6^{(7–1)} |
| 2022 | (United Kingdom) Neal Skupski (2) (United States) Desirae Krawczyk (2) | (Australia) Matthew Ebden (Australia) Samantha Stosur | 6–4, 6–3 |
| 2023 | (Croatia) Mate Pavić (Ukraine) Lyudmyla Kichenok | (Belgium) Joran Vliegen (China) Xu Yifan | 6–4, 6–7^{(9–11)}, 6–3 |
| 2024 | (Poland) Jan Zieliński (Chinese Taipei) Hsieh Su-wei | (Mexico) Santiago González (Mexico) Giuliana Olmos | 6–4, 6–2 |
| 2025 | (Netherlands) Sem Verbeek (Czech Republic) Kateřina Siniaková | (United Kingdom) Joe Salisbury (Brazil) Luisa Stefani | 7–6^{(7–3)}, 7–6^{(7–3)} |
| 2026 | (El Salvador) Marcelo Arévalo (Latvia) Jeļena Ostapenko | (Australia) Marc Polmans (Australia) Storm Hunter | 4–6, 7–5, 6–2 |

== See also ==
Wimbledon other competitions

- List of Wimbledon gentlemen's singles champions
- List of Wimbledon gentlemen's doubles champions
- List of Wimbledon ladies' singles champions
- List of Wimbledon ladies' doubles champions
- List of Wimbledon champions

Grand Slam mixed doubles

- List of Australian Open mixed doubles champions
- List of French Open mixed doubles champions
- List of US Open mixed doubles champions
- List of Grand Slam mixed doubles champions
