= 1921 Wimbledon Championships – Men's doubles =

Men's doubles
- 1921 Wimbledon Championships

Final
- Champions: (United Kingdom) Randolph Lycett (United Kingdom) Max Woosnam
- Runners-up: (United Kingdom) Arthur Lowe (United Kingdom) Gordon Lowe
- Score: 6–3, 6–0, 7–5

Details
- Draw: 64
- Seeds: –

Events
Singles	men	women		boys	girls
Doubles	men	women	mixed	boys	girls
← 1920 ·	Wimbledon Championships	· 1922 →

Randolph Lycett and Max Woosnam defeated Arthur Lowe and James Cecil Parke in the final, 6–3, 6–0, 7–5 to win the gentlemen's doubles tennis title at the 1921 Wimbledon Championships. The reigning champions Chuck Garland and R. Norris Williams did not defend their title.

== Draw ==
=== Key ===
- Q = Qualifier
- WC = Wild card
- LL = Lucky loser
- Alt = Alternate
- SE = Special exempt
- PR = Protected ranking
- ITF = ITF entry
- JE = Junior exempt
- w/o = Walkover
- r = Retired
- d = Defaulted
- SR = Special ranking

=== Finals ===
Quarterfinals
(United Kingdom) Arthur Lowe (United Kingdom) Gordon Lowe	6	6	6	6
(United Kingdom) Frank Jarvis (United Kingdom) Ernest Lamb	3	2	8	1
(United Kingdom) George Alston (British Ceylon) Frederick de Saram	1	2	2
(India) Lewis Deane (India) Sydney Jacob	6	6	6
(United Kingdom) Jack Hillyard (United Kingdom) Algernon Kingscote	4	3	6	0
(United Kingdom) Randolph Lycett (United Kingdom) Max Woosnam	6	6	3	6
(United Kingdom) Alfred Beamish (New Zealand) Frank Fisher	5	2	4
(United Kingdom) Herbert Roper Barrett (South Africa) Brian Norton	7	6	6

Semifinals
(United Kingdom) Arthur Lowe (United Kingdom) Gordon Lowe	6	6	4	6	12
(India) Lewis Deane (India) Sydney Jacob	1	8	6	0	10
(United Kingdom) Randolph Lycett (United Kingdom) Max Woosnam	8	2	6	6
(United Kingdom) Herbert Roper Barrett (South Africa) Brian Norton	6	6	3	4

Final
(United Kingdom) Arthur Lowe (United Kingdom) Gordon Lowe	3	0	5
(United Kingdom) Randolph Lycett (United Kingdom) Max Woosnam	6	6	7

=== Top half ===
==== Section 1 ====
First round
(United Kingdom) Ernest Parton (United Kingdom) Monty Temple	3	1	6	6
(United Kingdom) CS Grace (South Africa) Gerald Sherwell	6	6	4	8
(United Kingdom) Frank Donisthorpe (United Kingdom) BS Foster	6	6	6
(United Kingdom) LE Gaunt (Malaysia) DH Kleinman	0	4	3
(United Kingdom) JT Baines (United Kingdom) St John Pym	6	1	4	2
(United Kingdom) Walter Crawley (United Kingdom) Albert Prebble	4	6	6	6
(United Kingdom) Arthur Lowe (United Kingdom) Gordon Lowe	6	6	6
(India) Sirdar Dass (India) Bharpur Singh	0	4	4
(United Kingdom) Frank Jarvis (United Kingdom) Ernest Lamb	6	7	6	6
(Belgium) Paul de Borman (Belgium) Antoine de Bousies	3	9	3	1
(United Kingdom) GR Ashton (United Kingdom) ME Nigel-Jones	6	6	7
(United Kingdom) JW O'Farrell (United Kingdom) Ernest Seale	1	3	5
(France) Alain Gerbault (United Kingdom) A. Wallis Myers	6	6	3	9
(Sweden) Carl-Erik von Braun (United Kingdom) Patrick Wheatley	3	3	6	7
(United Kingdom) Charles Scroope (United Kingdom) George Thomas	7	8	7	5	6
(United States) Axel Gravem (United Kingdom) JCF Simpson	5	6	9	7	8

Second round
(United Kingdom) CS Grace (South Africa) G Sherwell	6	2	6	6
(United Kingdom) F Donisthorpe (United Kingdom) BS Foster	2	6	0	1
(United Kingdom) W Crawley (United Kingdom) A Prebble	3	5	6
(United Kingdom) A Lowe (United Kingdom) G Lowe	6	7	8
(United Kingdom) F Jarvis (United Kingdom) E Lamb	6	6	6
(United Kingdom) GR Ashton (United Kingdom) ME Nigel-Jones	4	4	2
(France) A Gerbault (United Kingdom) AW Myers	0	5	0
(United States) A Gravem (United Kingdom) JCF Simpson	6	7	6

Third round
(United Kingdom) CS Grace (South Africa) G Sherwell	4	4	6	6	3
(United Kingdom) A Lowe (United Kingdom) G Lowe	6	6	3	2	6
(United Kingdom) F Jarvis (United Kingdom) E Lamb	1	6	1	6	6
(United States) A Gravem (United Kingdom) JCF Simpson	6	2	6	1	0

Quarterfinals
(United Kingdom) A Lowe (United Kingdom) G Lowe	6	6	6	6
(United Kingdom) F Jarvis (United Kingdom) E Lamb	3	2	8	1

==== Section 2 ====
First round
(United Kingdom) JA Frost (India) Cotah Ramaswami	4	8	9	6	8
(United Kingdom) Arthur Belgrave (United Kingdom) HJ Graham-Bennett	6	6	11	2	6
(United Kingdom) GDH Alston (British Ceylon) Frederick de Saram	6	6	6
Maj. Baden Powell (United Kingdom) Hew Stoker	3	3	4
(United Kingdom) LM Andrews (United Kingdom) HS Job	3	4	6
(United Kingdom) Alex Drew (United Kingdom) Leslie Godfree	6	6	8
(United Kingdom) Neville Deed (United Kingdom) RH Hotham	2	4	1
(Australia) Alfred Jones (United States) J Jones	6	6	6
(United Kingdom) George Cartwright (United Kingdom) Henry Martin	5	5	6	6	6
(United Kingdom) E Morris Hall (United Kingdom) AJ Jimenez	7	7	4	3	8
(India) Lewis Deane (India) Sydney Jacob	6	6	6
(India) Athar-Ali Fyzee (India) Hassan Ali Fyzee	1	4	3
(United Kingdom) Stanley Franklin (United Kingdom) WL Hollick	w/o
(United Kingdom) George Boustead (United Kingdom) JL Holt
(United Kingdom) FP Down (United Kingdom) Humphrey Milford	7	1	1	6	6
(United Kingdom) Alfred Ingram (United Kingdom) Leonard Lyle	5	6	6	2	4

Second round
(United Kingdom) JA Frost (India) C Ramaswami	8	5	2
(United Kingdom) GDH Alston (British Ceylon) F de Saram	10	7	6
(United Kingdom) A Drew (United Kingdom) L Godfree	7	4	3	7
(Australia) A Jones (United States) J Jones	5	6	6	9
(United Kingdom) E Morris Hall (United Kingdom) AJ Jimenez	0	1	3
(India) L Deane (India) S Jacob	6	6	6
(United Kingdom) G Boustead (United Kingdom) JL Holt	4	3	3
(United Kingdom) FP Down (United Kingdom) H Milford	6	6	6

Third round
(United Kingdom) G Alston (British Ceylon) F de Saram	6	4	3	6	7
(Australia) A Jones (United States) J Jones	4	6	6	3	5
(India) L Deane (India) S Jacob	8	3	6	6
(United Kingdom) FP Down (United Kingdom) H Milford	6	6	0	3

Quarterfinals
(United Kingdom) GDH Alston (British Ceylon) F de Saram	1	2	2
(India) L Deane (India) S Jacob	6	6	6

The nationality of Major Baden Powell is unknown.

=== Bottom half ===
==== Section 3 ====
First round
(United Kingdom) Cecil Campbell (United Kingdom) FH Teall	6	6	6
(United Kingdom) EG Bisseker (United Kingdom) Neville Willford	4	4	3
(Spain) Manuel Alonso (United Kingdom) Noel Turnbull	6	6	6
(United Kingdom) Vincent Burr (United Kingdom) Ulysses Williams	2	2	3
(United States) AW Asthalter (United States) Arthur Lovibond	1	5	11	4
(United Kingdom) Jack Hillyard (United Kingdom) Algernon Kingscote	6	7	9	6
(United Kingdom) Percival Davson (United Kingdom) Theodore Mavrogordato	6	6	6
(United Kingdom) Rercy Jewson (United Kingdom) OC Johnson	1	0	2
(United Kingdom) RS Barnes (United Kingdom) Roderick McNair	2	3	2
(United Kingdom) Randolph Lycett (United Kingdom) Max Woosnam	6	6	6
(United Kingdom) Cyril Eltringham (United Kingdom) Douglas Watson	6	6	5	6
(United Kingdom) Brian Gilbert (United Kingdom) GTC Watt	1	1	7	4
(France) André Gobert (France) William Laurentz	w/o
(United Kingdom) Thomas Bevan (United Kingdom) FCG Fison
(United Kingdom) LF Davin (United Kingdom) AW Davson	6	3	5	3
(United Kingdom) Percy Oakley (United Kingdom) Charles Sedgwick	4	6	7	6

Second round
(United Kingdom) C Campbell (United Kingdom) FH Teall	5	2	2
(Spain) M Alonso (United Kingdom) N Turnbull	7	6	6
(United Kingdom) J Hillyard (United Kingdom) A Kingscote	6	6	6
(United Kingdom) P Davson (United Kingdom) T Mavrogordato	2	2	3
(United Kingdom) R Lycett (United Kingdom) M Woosnam	6	6	6
(United Kingdom) C Eltringham (United Kingdom) D Watson	1	1	4
(United Kingdom) T Bevan (United Kingdom) FCG Fison	2	7	3	4
(United Kingdom) P Oakley (United Kingdom) C Sedgwick	6	5	6	6

Third round
(Spain) M Alonso (United Kingdom) N Turnbull	6	6	2	3	3
(United Kingdom) J Hillyard (United Kingdom) A Kingscote	2	2	6	6	6
(United Kingdom) R Lycett (United Kingdom) M Woosnam	5	6	3
(United Kingdom) P Oakley (United Kingdom) C Sedgwick	7	2	3^{r}

Quarterfinals
(United Kingdom) J Hillyard (United Kingdom) A Kingscote	4	3	6	0
(United Kingdom) R Lycett (United Kingdom) M Woosnam	6	6	3	6

==== Section 4 ====
First round
(United Kingdom) HL Askham (United Kingdom) Basil Harrison	7	8	2	3	2
(Netherlands) Arthur Diemer Kool (Netherlands) Christiaan van Lennep	5	6	6	6	6
(United Kingdom) Ambrose Dudley (United Kingdom) John Cecil Masterman	w/o
(United Kingdom) Charles Dixon (Japan) Zenzo Shimizu
(United Kingdom) St John Evers (United Kingdom) CS Gordon-Smith	7	6	3	7
AJ Hubert (United Kingdom) Bill Swinden	5	1	6	5
(United Kingdom) George Birtles (United Kingdom) William Radcliffe	4	9	6
(United Kingdom) Alfred Beamish (New Zealand) Frank Fisher	6	11	8
(United Kingdom) Arthur Gore (United States) Frank Hunter	6	3	7	6
(United Kingdom) Scotter Owen (United Kingdom) Francis Stowe	4	6	5	2
(United Kingdom) Harold Aitken (United Kingdom) Hamilton Price	2	2	5
(United Kingdom) Herbert Roper Barrett (South Africa) Brian Norton	6	6	7
(United Kingdom) Major Ritchie (India) Mohammed Sleem	2	2	2
(United Kingdom) Ben Haughton (United Kingdom) Mark Hick	6	6	6
C Goodall (United Kingdom) MRL White	6	6	1	6
(United Kingdom) Eric Portlock (United Kingdom) WT Tucker	3	4	6	2

Second round
(Netherlands) A Diemer Kool (Netherlands) C van Lennep	6	2	6	3	7
(United Kingdom) C Dixon (Japan) Z Shimizu	2	6	4	6	5
(United Kingdom) StJ Evers (United Kingdom) CS Gordon-Smith	2	2	4
(United Kingdom) A Beamish (New Zealand) F Fisher	6	6	6
(United Kingdom) A Gore (United States) F Hunter	1	2	1
(United Kingdom) HR Barrett (South Africa) B Norton	6	6	6
(United Kingdom) B Haughton (United Kingdom) M Hick	7	6	6
C Goodall (United Kingdom) MRL White	5	2	3

Third round
(Netherlands) A Diemer Kool (Netherlands) C van Lennep	6	3	6	3
(United Kingdom) A Beamish (New Zealand) F Fisher	8	6	3	6
(United Kingdom) HR Barrett (South Africa) B Norton	6	6	6
(United Kingdom) B Haughton (United Kingdom) M Hick	3	3	2

Quarterfinals
(United Kingdom) A Beamish (New Zealand) F Fisher	5	2	4
(United Kingdom) HR Barrett (South Africa) B Norton	7	6	6

The nationalities of AJ Hubert and C Goodall is unknown.
