= 1923 Wimbledon Championships – Men's doubles =

Men's doubles
- 1923 Wimbledon Championships

Final
- Champions: (United Kingdom) Leslie Godfree (United Kingdom) Randolph Lycett
- Runners-up: (Spain) Eduardo Flaquer (Spain) Manuel de Gomar
- Score: 6–3, 6–4, 3–6, 6–3

Details
- Draw: 64
- Seeds: –

Events
Singles	men	women		boys	girls
Doubles	men	women	mixed	boys	girls
← 1922 ·	Wimbledon Championships	· 1924 →

James Anderson and Randolph Lycett were the defending champions, but Anderson did not participate. Lycett partnered with Leslie Godfree and defeated Eduardo Flaquer and Manuel de Gomar in the final, 6–3, 6–4, 3–6, 6–3 to win the gentlemen's doubles tennis title at the 1923 Wimbledon Championships.

== Draw ==
=== Key ===
- Q = Qualifier
- WC = Wild card
- LL = Lucky loser
- Alt = Alternate
- ITF = ITF entry
- PR = Protected ranking
- SR = Special ranking
- SE = Special exempt
- JE = Junior exempt
- JR = Junior Accelerator Programme entrant
- CO = College Accelerator Programme entrant
- NG = Next Gen Accelerator Program entrant
- w/o = Walkover
- r = Retired
- d = Defaulted

=== Finals ===
Quarterfinals
(India) Lewis Deane (India) Hassan Ali Fyzee	4	4	6	6	8
(United Kingdom) Harold Aitken (United Kingdom) William Radcliffe	6	6	4	3	6
(United Kingdom) Leslie Godfree (United Kingdom) Randolph Lycett	6	6	6
(United Kingdom) Jack Hillyard (South Africa) Gerald Sherwell	4	4	4
(Spain) Eduardo Flaquer (Spain) Manuel de Gomar	10	6	6
(United Kingdom) Alfred Ingram (United Kingdom) John Cecil Masterman	8	3	3
(United States) Frank Hunter (United States) Vincent Richards	3	4	6	6	4
(France) Jean Borotra (France) René Lacoste	6	6	2	4	6

Semifinals
(India) Lewis Deane (India) Hassan Ali Fyzee	6	4	3
(United Kingdom) Leslie Godfree (United Kingdom) Randolph Lycett	8	6	6
(Spain) Eduardo Flaquer (Spain) Manuel de Gomar	11	4	6	3	7
(France) Jean Borotra (France) René Lacoste	9	6	4	6	5

Final
(United Kingdom) Leslie Godfree (United Kingdom) Randolph Lycett	6	6	3	6
(Spain) Eduardo Flaquer (Spain) Manuel de Gomar	3	4	6	3

=== Top half ===
==== Section 1 ====
First round
(United Kingdom) Sydney Watts (United Kingdom) Neville Willford	4	4	4
(United Kingdom) Charles Dixon (United Kingdom) Frank Wallers	6	6	6
(United Kingdom) Leonard Lyle (United Kingdom) Albert Prebble	6	6	6
(United Kingdom) CS Gordon-Smith (United Kingdom) AJ Jimenez	2	3	2
(India) Lewis Deane (India) Hassan Ali Fyzee	6	7	6
(Australia) Noel Heath (United Kingdom) A. Wallis Myers	3	5	4
(United Kingdom) Mark Hick (United Kingdom) AH McCormick	1	3	5
(United Kingdom) HF Hunt (United Kingdom) Ernest Lamb	6	6	7
(United Kingdom) Lionel Alderson (Republic of Ireland) F Crosbie	6	1	2	6	6
(United Kingdom) G Aylmer (United Kingdom) Arthur Berger	3	6	6	2	1
(United Kingdom) Eric Portlock (United Kingdom) WT Tucker	2	0	8	8
(United Kingdom) Harold Aitken (United Kingdom) William Radcliffe	6	6	6	10
(United Kingdom) Norman Dicks (Canada) Henry Mayes	4	6	6	4	3
(Argentina) Carlos Caminos (Argentina) Alfredo Villegas	6	1	4	6	6
NB Deane (India) Athar-Ali Fyzee	2	6	3	4
(United Kingdom) Percy Oakley (United Kingdom) Charles Sedgwick	6	3	6	6

Second round
(United Kingdom) C Dixon (United Kingdom) F Wallers	w/o
(United Kingdom) L Lyle (United Kingdom) A Prebble
(India) L Deane (India) HA Fyzee	6	6	6
(United Kingdom) HF Hunt (United Kingdom) E Lamb	4	1	3
(United Kingdom) L Alderson (Republic of Ireland) F Crosbie	12	4	3	4
(United Kingdom) H Aitken (United Kingdom) W Radcliffe	10	6	6	6
(Argentina) C Caminos (Argentina) A Villegas	4	3	5
(United Kingdom) P Oakley (United Kingdom) C Sedgwick	6	6	7

Third round
(United Kingdom) L Lyle (United Kingdom) A Prebble	6	1	6	4	2
(India) L Deane (India) HA Fyzee	1	6	2	6	6
(United Kingdom) H Aitken (United Kingdom) W Radcliffe	6	6	6
(United Kingdom) P Oakley (United Kingdom) C Sedgwick	3	4	4

Quarterfinals
(India) L Deane (India) HA Fyzee	4	4	6	6	8
(United Kingdom) H Aitken (United Kingdom) W Radcliffe	6	6	4	3	6

The nationality of NB Deane is unknown.

==== Section 2 ====
First round
(United Kingdom) PC Chase (United Kingdom) JA Dean	1	3	2
(United Kingdom) Herbert Roper Barrett (South Africa) Brian Norton	6	6	6
(United Kingdom) James Legg (United Kingdom) Will Legg	6	4	6	0	2
(Argentina) Ronaldo Boyd (Argentina) Guillermo Robson	2	6	4	6	6
(United Kingdom) Donald Greig (United Kingdom) Max Woosnam	6	6	6
(United Kingdom) Norman Latchford (United Kingdom) Keats Lester	4	2	2
(United Kingdom) Leslie Godfree (United Kingdom) Randolph Lycett
(United Kingdom) George Golding (France) Pierre Henri Landry	w/o
(United Kingdom) Walter Crawley (Belgium) Jean Washer	6	8	6
(United Kingdom) George Birtles (United Kingdom) EG Bisseker	4	6	4
(United Kingdom) Jack Hillyard (South Africa) Gerald Sherwell
(United Kingdom) Gerry Millard (United Kingdom) George Stoddart	w/o
(United Kingdom) JT Baines (Romania) Nicolae Mișu	7	0	2	1
(Republic of Ireland) Cecil Campbell (India) Sydney Jacob	5	6	6	6
(France) Jacques Brugnon (France) Paul Féret	6	4	4	8	6
(United Kingdom) Scotter Owen (United Kingdom) Francis Stowe	1	6	6	6	1

Second round
(United Kingdom) HR Barrett (South Africa) B Norton	6	4	6	8
(Argentina) R Boyd (Argentina) G Robson	1	6	2	6
(United Kingdom) D Greig (United Kingdom) M Woosnam	6	7	2	6
(United Kingdom) L Godfree (United Kingdom) R Lycett	4	9	6	8
(United Kingdom) W Crawley (Belgium) J Washer	5	4	6	2
(United Kingdom) J Hillyard (South Africa) G Sherwell	7	6	3	6
(Republic of Ireland) C Campbell (India) S Jacob	1	6	6	6	1
(France) J Brugnon (France) P Féret	6	4	4	8	6

Third round
(United Kingdom) HR Barrett (South Africa) B Norton	6	4	2	6	4
(United Kingdom) L Godfree (United Kingdom) R Lycett	4	6	6	3	6
(United Kingdom) J Hillyard (South Africa) G Sherwell
(France) J Brugnon (France) P Féret	w/o

Quarterfinals
(United Kingdom) L Godfree (United Kingdom) R Lycett	6	6	6
(United Kingdom) J Hillyard (South Africa) G Sherwell	4	4	4

=== Bottom half ===
==== Section 3 ====
First round
(United Kingdom) Victor Cazalet (United Kingdom) GR Westmacott	5	2	2
(Spain) Eduardo Flaquer (Spain) Manuel de Gomar	7	6	6
(United Kingdom) Percival Davson (United Kingdom) Theodore Mavrogordato	6	6	6
(United Kingdom) Alex Drew (United Kingdom) Major Ritchie	2	1	1
(United Kingdom) LF Davin (United Kingdom) JM Morrison Sykes	6	6	4	6	2
(United Kingdom) WHM Aitken (United Kingdom) T Moss	2	8	6	3	6
(United Kingdom) Brian Gilbert (United Kingdom) Patrick Wheatley	6	5	4	5
(United Kingdom) JM Bell (United Kingdom) Ambrose Dudley	3	7	6	7
(Republic of Ireland) AE Browne (India) EBN Taylor	12	2	4
(United Kingdom) FP Down (United Kingdom) Humphrey Milford	14	6	6
(Australia) BE Henty (United Kingdom) Bill Swinden	1	1	4
(United Kingdom) Royden Dash (United Kingdom) Roy Poland	6	6	6
(United Kingdom) Monty Temple (United Kingdom) GTC Watt	3	7	1	3
(United Kingdom) Alfred Ingram (United Kingdom) John Cecil Masterman	6	5	6	6
(United Kingdom) HA Carless (United Kingdom) CP Luck	6	6	2	9
(United Kingdom) Eliot Crawshay-Williams (United Kingdom) Royden Wilkinson	4	3	6	7

Second round
(Spain) E Flaquer (Spain) M de Gomar	7	6	6
(United Kingdom) P Davson (United Kingdom) TM Mavrogordato	5	2	2
(United Kingdom) WHM Aitken (United Kingdom) T Moss	2	1	1
(United Kingdom) JM Bell (United Kingdom) A Dudley	6	6	6
(United Kingdom) FP Down (United Kingdom) H Milford	3	3	5
(United Kingdom) R Dash (United Kingdom) RD Poland	6	6	7
(United Kingdom) A Ingram (United Kingdom) JC Masterman	7	6	6
(United Kingdom) HA Carless (United Kingdom) CP Luck	5	3	3

Third round
(Spain) E Flaquer (Spain) M de Gomar	7	6	6
(United Kingdom) JM Bell (United Kingdom) A Dudley	5	2	4
(United Kingdom) R Dash (United Kingdom) R Poland	4	2	6	6	3
(United Kingdom) A Ingram (United Kingdom) JC Masterman	6	6	4	1	6

Quarterfinals
(Spain) E Flaquer (Spain) M de Gomar	10	6	6
(United Kingdom) A Ingram (United Kingdom) JC Masterman	8	3	3

==== Section 4 ====
First round
(United States) Frank Hunter (United States) Vincent Richards	6	6	7
(United Kingdom) RG Bernard (United Kingdom) DM Evans	2	3	5
(India) Syed Mohammad Hadi (India) Donald Rutnam	6	6	6
(United States) JP Carleton (Switzerland) Hector Fisher	2	4	4
(United Kingdom) Brian Helmore (United Kingdom) Teddy Higgs	2	6	6	9
(United Kingdom) DM Field (United Kingdom) N Field	6	2	2	7
(United Kingdom) EO Anderson (Australia) GP Sayers	6	4	2	6	6
(United Kingdom) AW Davson (United Kingdom) EJ Harrison	2	6	6	4	3
(United Kingdom) Clive Branfoot (United Kingdom) Douglas Watson	6	6	6
(United Kingdom) P Marsden (United Kingdom) Clinton McIlquham	2	2	2
(United Kingdom) Vincent Burr (United Kingdom) Ulysses Williams	6	6	6
(Sweden) Carl-Erik von Braun (Denmark) Henning Larsen	1	1	3
(France) Jean Borotra (France) René Lacoste	6	6	7	8
(United Kingdom) Alex Blair (South Africa) Pat Spence	3	3	9	6
(United Kingdom) Arthur Belgrave (United Kingdom) Gordon Crole-Rees	1	3	5
(United Kingdom) Leighton Crawford (New Zealand) Frank Fisher	6	6	7

Second round
(United States) F Hunter (United States) V Richards	6	9	6
(India) SM Hadi (India) D Rutnam	4	7	4
(United Kingdom) B Helmore (United Kingdom) E Higgs	6	6	6
(United Kingdom) EO Anderson (Australia) GP Sayers	4	4	4
(United Kingdom) C Branfoot (United Kingdom) D Watson	6	6	8
(United Kingdom) V Burr (United Kingdom) U Williams	3	3	6
(France) J Borotra (France) R Lacoste	14	6	6
(United Kingdom) FRL Crawford (New Zealand) F Fisher	12	4	2

Third round
(United States) F Hunter (United States) V Richards	6	6	6
(United Kingdom) B Helmore (United Kingdom) E Higgs	4	4	1
(United Kingdom) C Branfoot (United Kingdom) D Watson	2	2	2
(France) J Borotra (France) R Lacoste	6	6	6

Quarterfinals
(United States) F Hunter (United States) V Richards	3	4	6	6	4
(France) J Borotra (France) R Lacoste	6	6	2	4	6
