= 1921 Wimbledon Championships – Men's singles =

Men's singles
- 1921 Wimbledon Championships

Final
- Champion: (United States) Bill Tilden
- Runner-up: (South Africa) Brian Norton
- Score: 4–6, 2–6, 6–1, 6–0, 7–5

Details
- Draw: 128
- Seeds: –

Events
Singles	men	women		boys	girls
Doubles	men	women	mixed	boys	girls
← 1920 ·	Wimbledon Championships	· 1922 →

Brian Norton defeated Manuel Alonso 5–7, 4–6, 7–5, 6–3, 6–3 in the All Comers' Final, but the reigning champion Bill Tilden defeated Norton 4–6, 2–6, 6–1, 6–0, 7–5 in the challenge round to win the gentlemen's singles tennis title at the 1921 Wimbledon Championships.

Tilden was the last men's champion at the original Wimbledon location at Worple Road, and was also the last men's champion under the challenge round system. From 1922 onward the reigning champion, like every other player, would have to play from the beginning of the tournament instead of playing a single Challenge Round match against the winner of the all-comers tournament.

== Draw ==
=== Key ===
- Q = Qualifier
- WC = Wild card
- LL = Lucky loser
- Alt = Alternate
- SE = Special exempt
- PR = Protected ranking
- ITF = ITF entry
- JE = Junior exempt
- w/o = Walkover
- r = Retired
- d = Defaulted
- SR = Special ranking

=== Challenge round ===
Challenge Round
(South Africa) Brian Norton	6	6	1	0	5
(United States) Bill Tilden	4	2	6	6	7

=== All-Comers' Finals ===
Quarterfinals
(Japan) Zenzo Shimizu	6	9	3	6	10
(United Kingdom) Randolph Lycett	3	11	6	2	8
(Spain) Manuel Alonso	6	6	2	6
(United Kingdom) Algernon Kingscote	1	3	6	2
(United Kingdom) Cecil Campbell	2	5	6	4
(United States) Frank Hunter	6	7	3	6
(South Africa) Brian Norton	4	6	6	6
(Canada) Henry Mayes	6	2	2	2

Semifinals
(Japan) Zenzo Shimizu	6	5	6	4	6
(Spain) Manuel Alonso	3	7	3	6	8
(United States) Frank Hunter	0	3	7	7	2
(South Africa) Brian Norton	6	6	5	5	6

Final
(Spain) Manuel Alonso	7	6	5	3	3
(South Africa) Brian Norton	5	4	7	6	6

=== Top half ===
==== Section 1 ====
First round
(United Kingdom) Herbert Roper Barrett	3	6	6	6
(United Kingdom) Brian Gilbert	6	3	3	1
(United Kingdom) Francis Stowe	6	5	7	6
(United Kingdom) ME Nigel-Jones	3	7	5	4
(United Kingdom) Scotter Owen	6	6	6
(United Kingdom) George Golding	4	2	2
(United Kingdom) GTC Watt
(United Kingdom) Stanley Franklin	w/o
(United Kingdom) RH Hotham	1	1	0
(Japan) Zenzo Shimizu	6	6	6
(Belgium) Antoine de Bousies
(United States) Jed Jones	w/o
(United Kingdom) Charles Roupell	8	9	6
(United Kingdom) CS Grace	6	7	4
(United Kingdom) Roderick McNair	3	5	1
(United Kingdom) Noel Turnbull	6	7	6

Second round
(United Kingdom) HR Barrett	6	6	6
(United Kingdom) F Stowe	2	4	3
(United Kingdom) S Owen	6	6	6
(United Kingdom) GTC Watt	1	3	4
(Japan) Z Shimizu	6	6	6
(Belgium) A de Bousies	0	2	0
(United Kingdom) C Roupell	0	3	3
(United Kingdom) N Turnbull	6	6	6

Third round
(United Kingdom) HR Barrett	6	6	6
(United Kingdom) S Owen	0	1	3
(Japan) Z Shimizu	6	7	6
(United Kingdom) N Turnbull	3	5	1

Fourth round
(United Kingdom) HR Barrett	3	3	1
(Japan) Z Shimizu	6	6	6

==== Section 2 ====
First round
(India) Cotah Ramaswami	3	2	2
(United Kingdom) Alfred Beamish	6	6	6
(United Kingdom) Ambrose Dudley	w/o
(United Kingdom) GR Ashton
(United Kingdom) FH Teall	3	0	4
(United Kingdom) Charles Scroope	6	6	6
(Sweden) Carl-Erik von Braun	4	2	0
(United Kingdom) Major Ritchie	6	6	6
(South Africa) PM Dixon	6	1	6	3	5
(United Kingdom) Ulysses Williams	2	6	3	6	7
(United Kingdom) Alfred Hunter	w/o
(United Kingdom) George Stoddart
(United Kingdom) Arthur Belgrave	6	6	6
(United Kingdom) G Towle	0	4	1
(United Kingdom) LE Gaunt	0	2	4
(United Kingdom) Randolph Lycett	6	6	6

Second round
(United Kingdom) A Beamish
(United Kingdom) GR Ashton	w/o
(United Kingdom) C Scroope	3	6	0
(United Kingdom) M Ritchie	6	8	6
(United Kingdom) U Williams
(United Kingdom) G Stoddart	w/o
(United Kingdom) A Belgrave	3	2	4
(United Kingdom) R Lycett	6	6	6

Third round
(United Kingdom) A Beamish	6	6	8
(United Kingdom) M Ritchie	3	2	6
(United Kingdom) U Williams	2	2	0
(United Kingdom) R Lycett	6	6	6

Fourth round
(United Kingdom) A Beamish	6	6	4
(United Kingdom) R Lycett	8	8	6

==== Section 3 ====
First round
(United Kingdom) Herbert Pervin	1	2	2
(South Africa) Gerald Sherwell	6	6	6
(United Kingdom) Percy Pinckney	1	1^{r}
(United Kingdom) Monty Temple	6	4
(United Kingdom) William Radcliffe	6	5	8	6
(United Kingdom) WL Hollick	2	7	6	2
(United Kingdom) George Birtles	6	6	6	6
(United Kingdom) HS Job	8	4	4	4
(United Kingdom) LM Andrews	6	7	3	2
(United Kingdom) Hew Stoker	0	9	6	6
(United Kingdom) A. Wallis Myers	6	6	6
(United Kingdom) Ernest Parton	4	3	1
(United Kingdom) HL Askham	0	3	3
(Spain) Manuel Alonso	6	6	6
(United Kingdom) Thomas Nicholson	3	5	3
(United Kingdom) LF Davin	6	7	6

Second round
(South Africa) G Sherwell	1	5	7	7	6
(United Kingdom) M Temple	6	7	5	5	2
(United Kingdom) W Radcliffe	6	4	1	6	1
(United Kingdom) G Birtles	1	6	6	4	6
(United Kingdom) H Stoker	1	6	6	8
(United Kingdom) AW Myers	6	3	2	6
(Spain) M Alonso	6	6	6
(United Kingdom) LF Davin	2	0	3

Third round
(South Africa) G Sherwell	6	6	8
(United Kingdom) G Birtles	2	4	6
(United Kingdom) H Stoker	3	1	2
(Spain) M Alonso	6	6	6

Fourth round
(South Africa) G Sherwell	0	2	2
(Spain) M Alonso	6	6	6

==== Section 4 ====
First round
(United States) Arthur Lovibond	6	9	6
(United Kingdom) T Moss	2	7	4
(United Kingdom) St John Evers	4	3	8
(United Kingdom) S Watts	6	6	10
(United Kingdom) Theodore Mavrogordato	6	6	6
(United Kingdom) Neville Deed	3	2	1
(United Kingdom) E Morris Hall	1	0	2
(United Kingdom) AW Davson	6	6	6
(New Zealand) Frank Fisher	2	1	5
(United Kingdom) Algernon Kingscote	6	6	7
(Italy) GLA Brian	4	3	1
(United Kingdom) Charles Dixon	6	6	6
(United Kingdom) Gordon Lowe
(United Kingdom) Walter Crawley	w/o
(United Kingdom) CS Gordon-Smith	1	1	2
(India) Hassan Ali Fyzee	6	6	6

Second round
(United States) A Lovibond	6	6	6
(United Kingdom) S Watts	3	0	1
(United Kingdom) T Mavrogordato	6	6	7
(United Kingdom) AW Davson	1	0	5
(United Kingdom) A Kingscote	6	6	6
(United Kingdom) C Dixon	1	0	0
(United Kingdom) G Lowe	2	6	6	6
(India) HA Fyzee	6	4	3	1

Third round
(United States) A Lovibond	3	4	3
(United Kingdom) T Mavrogordato	6	6	6
(United Kingdom) A Kingscote	6	6	6
(United Kingdom) G Lowe	2	3	3

Fourth round
(United Kingdom) T Mavrogordato	0	8	4
(United Kingdom) A Kingscote	6	10	6

=== Bottom half ===
==== Section 5 ====
First round
(United Kingdom) GDH Alston	3	2	3
(United Kingdom) Max Woosnam	6	6	6
(United Kingdom) Alex Drew	5	6	6	6
(United Kingdom) HP Greenwood	7	2	1	3
(United Kingdom) Brame Hillyard	2	5	1
(United Kingdom) Cecil Campbell	6	7	6
(France) Alain Gerbault	4	6	10	6
(India) Athar-Ali Fyzee	6	4	8	4
(Netherlands) Arthur Diemer Kool	6	4	5	6	6
(United States) Axel Gravem	4	6	7	4	3
(Malaysia) DH Kleinman	0	6	4	6	9
(Switzerland) René de Grenus	6	3	6	3	7
(France) André Gobert
(France) William Laurentz	w/o
(United Kingdom) Frank Donisthorpe	4	6	4	6	6
(United Kingdom) Harold Aitken	6	4	6	3	0

Second round
(United Kingdom) M Woosnam	5	1	6	6	7
(United Kingdom) A Drew	7	6	3	2	5
(United Kingdom) C Campbell	6	6	6
(France) A Gerbault	2	3	2
(Netherlands) A Diemer Kool	8	6	6
(Malaysia) DH Kleinman	6	1	3
(France) A Gobert	6	4	6	6
(United Kingdom) F Donisthorpe	0	6	1	0

Third round
(United Kingdom) M Woosnam	5	3	7	6	4
(United Kingdom) C Campbell	7	6	5	2	6
(Netherlands) A Diemer Kool	3	6	1	4
(France) A Gobert	6	4	6	6

Fourth round
(United Kingdom) C Campbell	9	1	4	4
(France) A Gobert	7	6	6	2^{r}

==== Section 6 ====
First round
(United Kingdom) Cyril Eltringham	3	2	3
(United Kingdom) Leslie Godfree	6	6	6
(United Kingdom) Percival Davson	6	3	6	6
(United Kingdom) JA Frost	2	6	1	4
(United Kingdom) Ben Haughton	6	6	6
(United Kingdom) JL Holt	4	4	1
(United Kingdom) Jack Hillyard	3	2	0
(United States) Frank Hunter	6	6	6
(United Kingdom) JCF Simpson	1	0	2
(India) Mohammed Sleem	6	6	6
(United Kingdom) George Cartwright	6	6	6
(United Kingdom) AK Davis	2	1	3
(United Kingdom) Douglas Watson	6	6	2	6
(United Kingdom) Mark Hick	4	2	6	4
(United States) U Kramet	6	6	7	6
(Australia) Denis Browne	3	3	9	3

Second round
(United Kingdom) L Godfree	0	7	1
(United Kingdom) P Davson	6	9	6
(United Kingdom) B Haughton	6	3	6	5	2
(United States) F Hunter	4	6	3	7	6
(India) M Sleem	6	6	6
(United Kingdom) G Cartwright	3	0	1
(United Kingdom) D Watson	6	9	6
(United States) U Kramet	2	7	2

Third round
(United Kingdom) P Davson	5	3	6	7	7
(United States) F Hunter	7	6	1	5	9
(India) M Sleem	6	6	6
(United Kingdom) D Watson	4	4	2

Fourth round
(United States) F Hunter	2	7	6	7
(India) M Sleem	6	5	3	5

==== Section 7 ====
First round
(United Kingdom) Ernest Black	6	2	6	7
(British Ceylon) Frederick de Saram	3	6	1	5
(United Kingdom) Patrick Wheatley	6	6	6
(India) Lewis Deane	4	4	2
(United Kingdom) Basil Harrison	6	6	6
(Italy) Joe Nathan	4	2	4
(United Kingdom) John Cecil Masterman	4	4	12	2
(South Africa) Brian Norton	6	6	10	6
(United Kingdom) Arthur Lowe	4	6	6	6
(United Kingdom) Leonard Lyle	6	3	4	1
(United Kingdom) Francis de Weck	2	5	1
(Belgium) Paul de Borman	6	7	6
(United Kingdom) Arthur Gore	3	2	2
(India) Sydney Jacob	6	6	6
(United Kingdom) HumphreyMilford	7	4	5	5
(United Kingdom) George Thomas	5	6	7	7

Second round
(United Kingdom) E Black	5	2	3
(United Kingdom) P Wheatley	7	6	6
(United Kingdom) B Harrison	3	2	1
(South Africa) B Norton	6	6	6
(United Kingdom) A Lowe	6	6	6
(Belgium) P de Borman	2	0	1
(India) S Jacob	6	6	6
(United Kingdom) G Thomas	3	3	1

Third round
(United Kingdom) P Wheatley	4	4	3
(South Africa) B Norton	6	6	6
(United Kingdom) A Lowe	6	3	2	2
(India) S Jacob	1	6	6	6

Fourth round
(South Africa) B Norton	6	6	6
(India) S Jacob	1	1	2

==== Section 8 ====
First round
(United Kingdom) EJ Bunbury	0	2	4
(Netherlands) Christiaan van Lennep	6	6	6
(United States) Arnold Jones	1	2	6	3
(United Kingdom) Alfred Ingram	6	6	4	6
(United Kingdom) JW O'Farrell	2	0	0
(United Kingdom) OC Johnson	6	6	6
(United Kingdom) Robert Walker	1	0	6	2
(United Kingdom) Thomas Bevan	6	6	1	6
(United Kingdom) George Boustead	4	3	1
(United Kingdom) EG Bisseker	6	6	6
(United Kingdom) FP Down	2	1	2
(Canada) Henry Mayes	6	6	6
(United Kingdom) RS Barnes	4	6	7	2	2
(United Kingdom) Frank Jarvis	6	4	5	6	6
(United Kingdom) JT Baines	4	3	7
(United Kingdom) Royden Dash	6	6	9

Second round
(Netherlands) C van Lennep	6	6	6
(United Kingdom) A Ingram	1	1	3
(United Kingdom) OC Johnson	6	2	1	1
(United Kingdom) T Bevan	4	6	6	6
(United Kingdom) EG Bisseker	2	1	4
(Canada) H Mayes	6	6	6
(United Kingdom) F Jarvis	5	6	1	6	6
(United Kingdom) R Dash	7	2	6	3	4

Third round
(Netherlands) C van Lennep	6	4	6	6
(United Kingdom) T Bevan	4	6	1	2
(Canada) H Mayes	6	5	6	6
(United Kingdom) F Jarvis	3	7	4	3

Fourth round
(Netherlands) C van Lennep	w/o
(Canada) H Mayes

Preceded by 1921 Australasian Championships – Men's singles	Grand Slam men's singles	Succeeded by 1921 U.S. National Championships – Men's singles
