= 1921 in tennis =

This page covers all the important events in the sport of tennis in 1921. It provides the results of notable tournaments throughout the year on both the men's and women's ILTF tennis circuits.

== Australian Open ==
Category	Champion(s)	Finalist(s)	Score
Singles	(Australia) Rice Gemmell	(Australia) Alf Hedeman	7–5, 6–1, 6–4
Doubles	(Australia) Stanley Eaton (Australia) Rice Gemmell	(Australia) N. Brearley (Australia) Edward Stokes	7–5, 6–3, 6–3

== French Open ==
Not a Grand Slam event.

== Wimbledon ==
Category	Champion(s)	Finalist(s)	Score
Men's singles	(United States) Bill Tilden	(South Africa) Brian Norton	4–6, 2–6, 6–1, 6–0, 7–5
Women's singles	(France) Suzanne Lenglen	(United States) Elizabeth Ryan	6–2, 6–0
Men's doubles	(United Kingdom) Randolph Lycett (United Kingdom) Max Woosnam	(United Kingdom) Arthur Lowe (United Kingdom) Gordon Lowe	6–3, 6–0, 7–5
Women's doubles	(France) Suzanne Lenglen (United States) Elizabeth Ryan	(United Kingdom) Winifred Beamish (South Africa) Irene Peacock	6–1, 6–2
Mixed doubles	(United Kingdom) Randolph Lycett (United States) Elizabeth Ryan	(United Kingdom) Max Woosnam (United Kingdom) Phyllis Howkins	6–3, 6–1

== US Open ==
Category	Champion(s)	Finalist(s)	Score
Men's singles	(United States) Bill Tilden	(United States) Wallace F. Johnson	6–1, 6–3, 6–1
Women's singles	(United States) Molla Bjurstedt Mallory	(United States) Mary Browne	4–6, 6–4, 6–2
Men's doubles	(United States) Bill Tilden (United States) Vincent Richards	(United States) Richard Norris Williams (United States) Watson Washburn	13–11, 12–10, 6–1
Women's doubles	(United States) Mary Browne (United States) Louise Riddell Williams	(United States) Helen Gilleaudeau (United States) Aletta Bailey Morris	6–3, 6–2
Mixed doubles	(United States) Mary Browne (United States) Bill Johnston	(United States) Molla Bjurstedt Mallory (United States) Bill Tilden	3–6, 6–4, 6–3
