= 1923 Wimbledon Championships – Mixed doubles =

Mixed doubles
- 1923 Wimbledon Championships

Final
- Champions: (United Kingdom) Randolph Lycett (United States) Elizabeth Ryan
- Runners-up: (British Raj) Lewis Deane (United Kingdom) Dorothy Shepherd-Barron
- Score: 6–4, 7–5

Details
- Draw: 64
- Seeds: –

Events
Singles	men	women		boys	girls
Doubles	men	women	mixed	boys	girls
← 1922 ·	Wimbledon Championships	· 1924 →

Pat O'Hara Wood and Suzanne Lenglen were the defending champions, but O'Hara Wood did not compete. Lenglen partnered with Jean Washer, but lost in the semi-finals to eventual champions Randolph Lycett and Elizabeth Ryan.

Lycett and Ryan defeated Lewis Deane and Dorothy Shepherd-Barron in the final, 6–4, 7–5 to win the mixed doubles tennis title at the 1923 Wimbledon Championships.

== Draw ==
=== Key ===
- Q = Qualifier
- WC = Wild card
- LL = Lucky loser
- Alt = Alternate
- SE = Special exempt
- PR = Protected ranking
- ITF = ITF entry
- JE = Junior exempt
- w/o = Walkover
- r = Retired
- d = Defaulted
- SR = Special ranking

=== Finals ===
Quarterfinals
(British Raj) Lewis Deane (United Kingdom) Dorothy Shepherd-Barron	8	4	6
(United Kingdom) Jack Hillyard (United Kingdom) Phyllis Satterthwaite	6	6	3
(United Kingdom) Walter Crawley (United Kingdom) Kitty McKane	6	4	3
(United States) Vincent Richards (United States) Molla Mallory	3	6	6
(United Kingdom) Patrick Wheatley (United Kingdom) Evelyn Colyer	8	4
(United Kingdom) Randolph Lycett (United States) Elizabeth Ryan	10	6
(Belgium) Jean Washer (France) Suzanne Lenglen	6	6
(France) Jacques Brugnon (France) Élisabeth Macready	3	2

Semifinals
(British Raj) Lewis Deane (United Kingdom) Dorothy Shepherd-Barron	5	6	6
(United States) Vincent Richards (United States) Molla Mallory	7	3	4
(United Kingdom) Randolph Lycett (United States) Elizabeth Ryan	7	6
(Belgium) Jean Washer (France) Suzanne Lenglen	5	3

Final
(British Raj) Lewis Deane (United Kingdom) Dorothy Shepherd-Barron	4	5
(United Kingdom) Randolph Lycett (United States) Elizabeth Ryan	6	7

=== Top half ===
==== Section 1 ====
First round
(United Kingdom) Albert Prebble (United Kingdom) Winifred McNair	6	7	1
(France) René Lacoste (France) Julie Vlasto	2	9	6
(United Kingdom) Leslie Godfree (United Kingdom) Joan Reid-Thomas	6	4	6
(South Africa) Gerald Sherwell (United Kingdom) Vera Youle	2	6	8
(United Kingdom) Ernest Lamb (Netherlands) Kea Bouman	6	6
(United Kingdom) GTC Watt (United Kingdom) Doris Craddock	3	3
(British Raj) Lewis Deane (United Kingdom) Dorothy Shepherd-Barron	11	6
(South Africa) Brian Norton (United Kingdom) Ermyntrude Harvey	9	1
(United Kingdom) Max Woosnam (United Kingdom) Phyllis Covell	6	3	6
(United Kingdom) Charles Roupell (United Kingdom) Mrs HB Weston	3	6	1
(United Kingdom) JA Dean (United Kingdom) Norah Middleton	4	2
(United Kingdom) Ambrose Dudley (United Kingdom) Mrs IFL Elliot	6	6
(United Kingdom) RG Bernard (United Kingdom) Mrs AA Hall	6	3	1
(United Kingdom) Jack Hillyard (United Kingdom) Phyllis Satterthwaite	2	6	6
(United States) Bill Johnston (United States) Eleonora Sears	6	10
(United Kingdom) T Moss; Mrs D Harvey	4	8

Second round
(France) R Lacoste (France) J Vlasto	3	2
(South Africa) G Sherwell (United Kingdom) V Youle	6	6
(United Kingdom) E Lamb (Netherlands) K Bouman	3	6	3
(British Raj) L Deane (United Kingdom) D Shepherd-Barron	6	4	6
(United Kingdom) M Woosnam (United Kingdom) P Covell	6	6
(United Kingdom) A Dudley (United Kingdom) Mrs IFL Elliot	3	1
(United Kingdom) J Hillyard (United Kingdom) P Satterthwaite	7	6
(United States) W Johnston (United States) E Sears	5	4

Third round
(South Africa) G Sherwell (United Kingdom) V Youle	3	3
(British Raj) L Deane (United Kingdom) D Shepherd-Barron	6	6
(United Kingdom) M Woosnam (United Kingdom) P Covell	4	3
(United Kingdom) J Hillyard (United Kingdom) P Satterthwaite	6	6

Quarterfinals
(British Raj) L Deane (United Kingdom) D Shepherd-Barron	8	4	6
(United Kingdom) J Hillyard (United Kingdom) P Satterthwaite	6	6	3

The nationality of Mrs D Harvey is unknown.

==== Section 2 ====
First round
(Australia) BE Henty (United Kingdom) Enid Clarke	6	6
(United Kingdom) AJ Jimenez (United Kingdom) Mrs WE Hudleston	3	2
(United Kingdom) Norman Dicks (United Kingdom) Joan Austin	6	4	3
(United Kingdom) Percy Oakley (United Kingdom) MK Taylor	3	6	6
(United Kingdom) Walter Crawley (United Kingdom) Kitty McKane	6	6	6
(Republic of Ireland) Cecil Campbell (United Kingdom) Mrs Gunter	2	8	2
(United Kingdom) Donald Greig (United Kingdom) Dorothea Lambert Chambers	1	5
(United Kingdom) Alfred Ingram (United Kingdom) Peggy Ingram	6	7
(New Zealand) Frank Fisher (United Kingdom) Winifred Beamish	6	6
(United Kingdom) Bill Swinden (United Kingdom) E Kelsey	2	2
(United Kingdom) PC Chase (United Kingdom) Kathleen Lidderdale	3	6	2
(United States) Vincent Richards (United States) Molla Mallory	6	2	6
(Australia) Noel Heath (United Kingdom) Nancy Heath	4	4
(India) Athar-Ali Fyzee (United Kingdom) Ariadne Rodocanachi	6	6
(United Kingdom) JT Baines (United States) Leslie Bancroft	6	4	2
(United Kingdom) Frank Wallers (United Kingdom) Mrs WL Hollick	2	6	6

Second round
(Australia) BE Henty (United Kingdom) E Clarke	7	6
(United Kingdom) P Oakley (United Kingdom) MK Taylor	5	2
(United Kingdom) W Crawley (United Kingdom) K McKane	3	10	6
(United Kingdom) A Ingram (United Kingdom) M Ingram	6	8	3
(New Zealand) F Fisher (United Kingdom) W Beamish	6	6	4
(United States) V Richards (United States) M Mallory	8	3	6
(India) AA Fyzee (United Kingdom) A Rodocanachi	4	5
(United Kingdom) F Wallers (United Kingdom) Mrs WL Hollick	6	7

Third round
(Australia) BE Henty (United Kingdom) E Clarke	6	2	3
(United Kingdom) W Crawley (United Kingdom) K McKane	3	6	6
(United States) V Richards (United States) M Mallory	6	6
(United Kingdom) F Wallers (United Kingdom) Mrs WL Hollick	4	1

Quarterfinals
(United Kingdom) W Crawley (United Kingdom) K McKane	6	4	3
(United States) V Richards (United States) M Mallory	3	6	6

=== Bottom half ===
==== Section 3 ====
First round
(United Kingdom) George Thomas (United Kingdom) Hazel Hogarth	2	3
(United Kingdom) Harold Aitken (United Kingdom) Enid Head	6	6
(United Kingdom) Humphrey Milford (United Kingdom) Mrs HV Parbury	6	6
(United Kingdom) George Golding (United Kingdom) Joan Hextall	3	3
(United Kingdom) William Radcliffe (United Kingdom) Eleanor Rose	6	5	5
(United Kingdom) Patrick Wheatley (United Kingdom) Evelyn Colyer	4	7	7
(United Kingdom) Herbert Roper Barrett (United Kingdom) Mabel Clayton	6	6
(United Kingdom) EC Williams (United Kingdom) Weeta Donaldson	3	3
(France) Jean Borotra (United Kingdom) JL Colegate	7	6
(United Kingdom) CS Gordon-Smith (United Kingdom) Peggy Dransfield	5	2
(United Kingdom) Clive Branfoot (United Kingdom) L Cadle	6	7	6
(United Kingdom) Clinton McIlquham (United Kingdom) Mary McIlquham	8	5	3
(United Kingdom) Alex Blair (United Kingdom) Dorothy Holman	9	3	6
(United Kingdom) Eric Portlock (United Kingdom) Louise Bull	7	6	3
(United Kingdom) EG Bisseker (United Kingdom) Marie Hazel	5	4
(United Kingdom) Randolph Lycett (United States) Elizabeth Ryan	7	6

Second round
(United Kingdom) H Aitken (United Kingdom) E Head	3	4
(United Kingdom) H Milford (United Kingdom) Mrs HV Parbury	6	6
(United Kingdom) P Wheatley (United Kingdom) E Colyer	6	4	6
(United Kingdom) HR Barrett (United Kingdom) M Clayton	3	6	4
(France) J Borotra (United Kingdom) JL Colegate	6	6
(United Kingdom) C Branfoot (United Kingdom) L Cadle	1	4
(United Kingdom) A Blair (United Kingdom) D Holman	1	4
(United Kingdom) R Lycett (United States) E Ryan	6	6

Third round
(United Kingdom) H Milford (United Kingdom) Mrs HV Parbury	3	7
(United Kingdom) P Wheatley (United Kingdom) E Colyer	6	9
(France) J Borotra (United Kingdom) JL Colegate	3	4
(United Kingdom) R Lycett (United States) E Ryan	6	6

Quarterfinals
(United Kingdom) P Wheatley (United Kingdom) E Colyer	8	4
(United Kingdom) R Lycett (United States) E Ryan	10	6

==== Section 4 ====
First round
(India) Hassan Ali Fyzee (United Kingdom) Phoebe Holcroft	6	1	2
(United Kingdom) Alex Drew (United Kingdom) Claire Beckingham	1	6	6
(United Kingdom) Brian Gilbert (United States) Eleanor Goss	6	6
(United Kingdom) Teddy Higgs (United Kingdom) Sylvia Lumley-Ellis	3	0
(Belgium) Jean Washer (France) Suzanne Lenglen	6	6
(United States) AW Asthalter (United Kingdom) Aurea Edgington	3	1
(United Kingdom) Douglas Watson (United Kingdom) Molly Welsh	6	5	4
(Republic of Ireland) Harold Price (United Kingdom) Joy Coote	4	7	6
(United Kingdom) Theodore Mavrogordato (United Kingdom) Mabel Parton	3	4
(United Kingdom) Arthur Berger (United Kingdom) Madeline O'Neill	6	6
(United Kingdom) Charles Sedgwick (United Kingdom) CJ Tyrrell	8	7
(South Africa) Pat Spence; Mrs Herriot	6	5
(United Kingdom) Brian Helmore (Republic of Ireland) Mrs RRW Jackson	4	6
(United Kingdom) N Field (United Kingdom) Annie Cobb	6	8
(United Kingdom) Ulysses Williams (United Kingdom) Mrs MB Reckitt	2	6
(France) Jacques Brugnon (France) Elizabeth Macready	6	8

Second round
(India) HA Fyzee (United Kingdom) P Holcroft	4	5
(United Kingdom) B Gilbert (United States) E Goss	6	7
(Belgium) J Washer (France) S Lenglen	6	6
(Republic of Ireland) H Price (United Kingdom) J Coote	4	4
(United Kingdom) A Berger (United Kingdom) M O'Neill	9	6
(United Kingdom) C Sedgwick (United Kingdom) CJ Tyrrell	7	4
(United Kingdom) N Field (United Kingdom) A Cobb	6	2	1
(France) J Brugnon (France) E Macready	2	6	6

Third round
(United Kingdom) B Gilbert (United States) E Goss	2	2
(Belgium) J Washer (France) S Lenglen	6	6
(United Kingdom) A Berger (United Kingdom) M O'Neill	3	1
(France) J Brugnon (France) E Macready	6	6

Quarterfinals
(Belgium) J Washer (France) S Lenglen	6	6
(France) J Brugnon (France) E Macready	3	2

The nationality of Mrs Herriot is unknown.
