= 1923 Wimbledon Championships – Men's singles =

Men's singles
- 1923 Wimbledon Championships

Final
- Champion: (United States) Bill Johnston
- Runner-up: (United States) Frank Hunter
- Score: 6–0, 6–3, 6–1

Details
- Draw: 133
- Seeds: –

Events
Singles	men	women		boys	girls
Doubles	men	women	mixed	boys	girls
← 1922 ·	Wimbledon Championships	· 1924 →

Bill Johnston defeated Frank Hunter 6–0, 6–3, 6–1 in the final to win the gentlemen's singles tennis title at the 1923 Wimbledon Championships. The field consisted of 133 players and a preliminary round of five matches was held to bring the total down to a 128 men draw. Gerald Patterson was the defending champion, but did not participate.

== Draw ==
Key

- Q = Qualifier
- WC = Wild card
- LL = Lucky loser
- Alt = Alternate
- ITF = ITF entry
- PR = Protected ranking
- SR = Special ranking
- SE = Special exempt
- JE = Junior exempt
- JR = Junior Accelerator Programme entrant
- CO = College Accelerator Programme entrant
- NG = Next Gen Accelerator Program entrant
- w/o = Walkover
- r = Retired
- d = Defaulted

=== Finals ===
Quarterfinals
(Republic of Ireland) Cecil Campbell	1	7	2	2
(United States) Bill Johnston	6	5	6	6
(South Africa) Brian Norton	7	6	6
(United Kingdom) Max Woosnam	5	3	2
(United Kingdom) DM Evans	2	6	5
(United Kingdom) Gordon Lowe	6	8	7
(United States) Frank Hunter	3	4	6	6	6
(Spain) Manuel de Gomar	6	6	1	3	2

Semifinals
(United States) Bill Johnston	6	6	6
(South Africa) Brian Norton	4	2	4
(United Kingdom) Gordon Lowe	3	5	4
(United States) Frank Hunter	6	7	6

Final
(United States) Bill Johnston	6	6	6
(United States) Frank Hunter	0	3	1

=== Top half ===
==== Section 1 ====
First round
(France) René Lacoste	6	6	6
(Poland) DS Menda	0	4	1
(United Kingdom) AH McCormick	4	0	2
(United Kingdom) Royden Dash	6	6	6
(United Kingdom) LF Davin	6	6	4	6
(United Kingdom) FR Scovel	2	4	6	3
(United Kingdom) AW Davson	6	6	3	2	9
(Switzerland) Hector Fisher	4	4	6	6	7
(United Kingdom) PC Chase	1	2	4
(India) Syed Mohammad Hadi	6	6	6
(United Kingdom) RH Hotham	3	0	2
(United Kingdom) Arthur Macpherson	6	6	6
(Republic of Ireland) Cecil Campbell
(New Zealand) TR Quill	w/o
(South Africa) Gerald Sherwell	7	6	6
(United Kingdom) RF Scovell	5	3	2

Second round
(France) R Lacoste	6	6	6
(United Kingdom) R Dash	1	3	4
(United Kingdom) LF Davin	6	2	5
(United Kingdom) AW Davson	8	6	7
(India) SM Hadi	1	6	6	3	5
(United Kingdom) A Macpherson	6	2	3	6	7
(Republic of Ireland) C Campbell	7	6	8
(South Africa) G Sherwell	5	1	6

Third round
(France) R Lacoste	6	6	6
(United Kingdom) AW Davson	2	2	0
(United Kingdom) A Macpherson	3	1	4
(Republic of Ireland) C Campbell	6	6	6

Fourth round
(France) R Lacoste	6	6	3	2	3
(Republic of Ireland) C Campbell	1	3	6	6	6

==== Section 2 ====
First round
(United Kingdom) Neville Willford	2	3	6	3
(United Kingdom) George Stoddart	6	6	1	1^{r}
(France) Jacques Brugnon	6	6	6
(Australia) BE Henty	4	4	3
(Argentina) Guillermo Robson	0	1	2
(India) Sydney Jacob	6	6	6
(Belgium) Jean Washer	1	3	2
(United States) Vincent Richards	6	6	6
(United Kingdom) M Fox	2	7	6	3	6
(United Kingdom) William Radcliffe	6	5	0	6	4
(United Kingdom) Gerry Millard	5	6	4	5
(South Africa) Pat Spence	7	2	6	7
(United Kingdom) Douglas Watson	5	6	7	4
(United Kingdom) Leighton Crawford	7	3	5	1^{r}
(United Kingdom) Teddy Higgs	4	2	1
(United States) Bill Johnston	6	6	6

Second round
(United Kingdom) N Willford	3	3	2
(France) J Brugnon	6	6	6
(India) S Jacob	2	3	6
(United States) V Richards	6	6	8
(United Kingdom) M Fox	1	4	6
(South Africa) P Spence	6	6	8
(United Kingdom) D Watson	1	2	7
(United States) W Johnston	6	6	9

Third round
(France) J Brugnon	4	1	2
(United States) V Richards	6	6	6
(South Africa) P Spence	0	1	4
(United States) W Johnston	6	6	6

Fourth round
(United States) V Richards	4	3	5
(United States) W Johnston	6	6	7

==== Section 3 ====
First round
(United Kingdom) N Latchford	1	3	1
(United Kingdom) Patrick Wheatley	6	6	6
(United Kingdom) Humphrey Milford	6	7	6
(United States) JP Carleton	2	5	1
(United Kingdom) Major Ritchie	2	4	3
(South Africa) Brian Norton	6	6	6
(United Kingdom) Royden Wilkinson	3	2	6	2
(United Kingdom) Victor Penman	6	6	2	6
(United Kingdom) GW Grounsell	6	2	6	1	4
(United Kingdom) Francis Stowe	3	6	4	6	6
(United Kingdom) Scotter Owen	0	2	2
(United Kingdom) Walter Crawley	6	6	6
(United Kingdom) HR Fussell	6	6	6
(United Kingdom) P Marsden	4	3	2
(France) Jean Borotra	6	6	1	9
(United Kingdom) James Legg	4	1	6	7

Second round
(United Kingdom) P Wheatley	6	9	6
(United Kingdom) H Milford	3	7	4
(South Africa) B Norton	6	6	6
(United Kingdom) V Penman	0	3	1
(United Kingdom) F Stowe	2	3	2
(United Kingdom) W Crawley	6	6	6
(United Kingdom) HR Fussell	3	5	6
(France) J Borotra	6	6	8

Third round
(United Kingdom) P Wheatley	6	6	1	1	2
(South Africa) B Norton	3	8	6	6	6
(United Kingdom) W Crawley	6	2	6	5	0
(France) J Borotra	3	6	3	7	6

Fourth round
(South Africa) B Norton	6	7	6
(France) J Borotra	3	5	3

==== Section 4 ====
First round
(United Kingdom) Arthur Belgrave	3	4	4
(Canada) Henry Mayes	6	6	6
(United Kingdom) EG Bisseker	2	5	4
(New Zealand) Frank Fisher	6	7	6
(Argentina) Carlos Caminos
(United States) John Van Ryn	w/o
(Australia) Denis Browne	7	1	2	0
(United Kingdom) JT Baines	5	6	6	6
(United Kingdom) Theodore Mavrogordato	6	6	6
(Australia) GP Sayers	3	3	1
(Republic of Ireland) Harold Price	0	2	3
(United Kingdom) Max Woosnam	6	6	6
(United Kingdom) WHM Aitken	6	6	6
(United Kingdom) Lionel Alderson (Note: Played and won a preliminary round to qualify for the first round)	2	3	0
(United Kingdom) C Brierley	1	2	4
(United Kingdom) Jack Hillyard	6	6	6

Second round
(Canada) H Mayes	6	6	6
(New Zealand) F Fisher	2	2	0
(Argentina) C Caminos	4	4	4
(United Kingdom) JT Baines	6	6	6
(United Kingdom) T Mavrogordato	7	1	3	8
(United Kingdom) M Woosnam	5	6	6	10
(United Kingdom) WHM Aitken	5	5	2
(United Kingdom) J Hillyard	7	7	6

Third round
(Canada) H Mayes	6	6	6
(United Kingdom) JT Baines	1	4	3
(United Kingdom) M Woosnam	6	6	6
(United Kingdom) J Hillyard	4	3	3

Fourth round
(Canada) H Mayes	4	6	1
(United Kingdom) M Woosnam	6	8	6

=== Bottom half ===
==== Section 5 ====
First round
(United Kingdom) JM Bell	9	7	6
(United Kingdom) JA Dean	7	5	3
(United Kingdom) T Moss	4	6	2
(Denmark) Henning Larsen	6	8	6
(United Kingdom) John Cecil Masterman	6	6	6
(United Kingdom) Henry Standring	2	0	1
(United Kingdom) JF Philpotts	1	0	0
(Sweden) Carl-Erik von Braun	6	6	6
(United Kingdom) Alex Drew	6	2	4	4
(United Kingdom) Charles Kingsley	4	6	6	6
(India) Athar-Ali Fyzee	6	4	2	3
(United Kingdom) DM Evans	2	6	6	6
(India) Donald Rutnam	7	6	3	6
(British Raj) Lewis Deane	5	1	6	3
(United Kingdom) N Field	2	5	6	6	4
(United Kingdom) Ambrose Dudley	6	7	2	4	6

Second round
(United Kingdom) JM Bell	6	5	3	3
(Denmark) H Larsen	4	7	6	6
(United Kingdom) JC Masterman	4	6	1	6	6
(Sweden) C-E von Braun	6	4	6	0	3
(United Kingdom) C Kingsley	3	2	8	8	1
(United Kingdom) DM Evans	6	6	6	6	6
(India) D Rutnam	4	7	4
(United Kingdom) A Dudley	6	9	6

Third round
(Denmark) H Larsen	4	4	1
(United Kingdom) JC Masterman	6	6	6
(United Kingdom) DM Evans	7	6	4	6
(United Kingdom) A Dudley	5	3	6	4

Fourth round
(United Kingdom) JC Masterman	7	0	1	7	7
(United Kingdom) DM Evans	5	6	6	5	9

==== Section 6 ====
First round
(United Kingdom) Arthur Yencken	6	0	3	5
(United Kingdom) Roy Poland	1	6	6	7
(United Kingdom) Leslie Godfree	1	6	0	6	9
(Romania) Nicolae Mișu	6	4	6	2	7
(United Kingdom) Victor Cazalet	3	6	1	6	3
(United Kingdom) Arthur Berger	6	3	6	1	6
(United Kingdom) Eric Portlock	5	3	6	6	1
(United States) U Kramet	7	6	4	3	6
(Republic of Ireland) F Crosbie	0	7	2
(United Kingdom) Brian Gilbert	6	9	6
(United Kingdom) Gordon Lowe	6	6	6
(United Kingdom) Sydney Watts	3	2	0
(United Kingdom) Monty Temple	6	6	6
(United Kingdom) S Simons	3	0	3
(United Kingdom) Randolph Lycett	6	6	1	6
(United Kingdom) Ulysses Williams	3	1	6	1

Second round
(United Kingdom) R Poland	4	7	3
(United Kingdom) L Godfree	6	9	6
(United Kingdom) A Berger	6	6	3	4	8
(United States) U Kramet	1	2	6	6	6
(United Kingdom) B Gilbert	5	4	6
(United Kingdom) G Lowe	7	6	8
(United Kingdom) M Temple	4	4	2
(United Kingdom) R Lycett	6	6	6

Third round
(United Kingdom) L Godfree	4	5	1
(United Kingdom) A Berger	6	7	6
(United Kingdom) G Lowe	6	8	3	6
(United Kingdom) R Lycett	1	6	6	3

Fourth round
(United Kingdom) A Berger	4	6	1	6
(United Kingdom) G Lowe	6	3	6	8

==== Section 7 ====
First round
(United Kingdom) Eliot Crawshay-Williams	6	3	12	1	4
(United Kingdom) Vincent Burr	4	6	10	6	6
(Spain) Eduardo Flaquer	5	4	1
(United States) Frank Hunter	7	6	6
(Argentina) Ronaldo Boyd	0	0	0
(India) Hassan Ali Fyzee	6	6	6
(United Kingdom) Charles Dixon	3	2	0^{r}
(France) Paul Féret	6	6	0
(France) Antoine Gentien	8	4	0
(United Kingdom) Norman Dicks	10	6	6
(Australia) Noel Heath	6	5	2	3
(United Kingdom) Percival Davson	1	7	6	6
(United Kingdom) HA Carless	1	6	6	6
(United Kingdom) Noel Turnbull	6	3	4	1
(United Kingdom) Alex Blair	6	5	10	1	3
(United Kingdom) Hew Stoker	2	7	8	6	6

Second round
(United Kingdom) V Burr	7	0	1	3
(United States) F Hunter	5	6	6	6
(India) HA Fyzee	6	6	1	6
(France) P Féret	3	3	6	4
(United Kingdom) N Dicks	6	6	6	1	9
(United Kingdom) P Davson	8	3	2	6	7
(United Kingdom) HA Carless	6	6	3	5	6
(United Kingdom) H Stoker	0	0	6	7	2

Third round
(United States) F Hunter	8	6	7
(India) HA Fyzee	6	3	5
(United Kingdom) N Dicks	7	6	7
(United Kingdom) HA Carless	5	4	5

Fourth round
(United States) F Hunter	9	6	8
(United Kingdom) N Dicks	7	4	6

==== Section 8 ====
First round
(United Kingdom) Cecil Tindell-Green	9	6	6
(United Kingdom) Brian Helmore	7	1	3
(United Kingdom) Clinton McIlquham	3	4	4
(United Kingdom) Bill Swinden	6	6	6
(Spain) Manuel de Gomar	4	6	6	6
(United Kingdom) Thomas Bevan	6	2	2	3
(United Kingdom) Alfred Ingram	6	3	6	3	7
(United Kingdom) George Golding	1	6	1	6	5
(United Kingdom) Donald Greig	6	6	6
(United Kingdom) George Thomas	4	4	2
(India) EBN Taylor	6	2	6	6	6
(United Kingdom) Clive Branfoot	3	6	8	1	4
(United Kingdom) Charles Roupell	6	7	6
(United Kingdom) RG Bernard	0	5	2
(United Kingdom) Mark Hick	3	4	5
(United Kingdom) CP Luck	6	6	7

Second round
(United Kingdom) C Tindell-Green	6	6	6
(United Kingdom) W Swinden	4	0	4
(Spain) M de Gomar	6	6	7
(United Kingdom) A Ingram	4	4	5
(United Kingdom) D Greig	6	6	6
(India) EBN Taylor	4	2	4
(United Kingdom) C Roupell	6	2	6	4	3
(United Kingdom) CP Luck	3	6	4	6	6

Third round
(United Kingdom) C Tindell-Green	6	4	2
(Spain) M de Gomar	8	6	6
(United Kingdom) D Greig	6	6	6
(United Kingdom) CP Luck	1	4	3

Fourth round
(Spain) M de Gomar	4	6	6	6
(United Kingdom) D Greig	6	0	1	4

=== Preliminary round ===
Player 1	Winning score	Player 2
(United Kingdom) Lionel Alderson	Walkover	(United Kingdom) EO Anderson
(United Kingdom) CJ Brierley	6–1, 6–2, 3–6, 10–8	(United Kingdom) Keats Lester
(United Kingdom) Jack Hillyard	6–3, 6–2, 7–5	(Argentina) Alfredo Villegas
(United Kingdom) JM Bell	6–0, 6–2, 6–2	(United Kingdom) SM Lahey-Bean
(United Kingdom) JA Dean	Walkover	(United Kingdom) Leonard Lyle

== Notes ==
Preceded by 1923 Australasian Championships – Men's singles	Grand Slam men's singles	Succeeded by 1923 U.S. National Championships – Men's singles
