= 1923 Wimbledon Championships =

- Date: 25 June – 7 July
- Edition: 43rd
- Category: Grand Slam
- Surface: Grass
- Location: Church Road; SW19, Wimbledon, London, United Kingdom
- Venue: All England Lawn Tennis and Croquet Club

Champions

Men's singles
- (United States) Bill Johnston

Women's singles
- (France) Suzanne Lenglen

Men's doubles
- (United Kingdom) Leslie Godfree / (United Kingdom) Randolph Lycett

Women's doubles
- (France) Suzanne Lenglen / (United States) Elizabeth Ryan

Mixed doubles
- (United Kingdom) Randolph Lycett / (United States) Elizabeth Ryan
- Wimbledon Championships

The 1923 Wimbledon Championships took place on the outdoor grass courts at the All England Lawn Tennis and Croquet Club in Wimbledon, London, United Kingdom. The tournament ran from 25 June until 7 July. It was the 43rd staging of the Wimbledon Championships, and the first Grand Slam tennis event of 1923.

== Finals ==
=== Men's singles ===
(United States) Bill Johnston defeated (United States) Frank Hunter, 6–0, 6–3, 6–1

=== Women's singles ===
(France) Suzanne Lenglen defeated (United Kingdom) Kitty McKane, 6–2, 6–2

=== Men's doubles ===
(United Kingdom) Leslie Godfree / (United Kingdom) Randolph Lycett defeated (Spain) Eduardo Flaquer / (Spain) Manuel de Gomar, 6–3, 6–4, 3–6, 6–3

=== Women's doubles ===
(France) Suzanne Lenglen / (United States) Elizabeth Ryan defeated (United Kingdom) Joan Austin / (United Kingdom) Evelyn Colyer, 6–3, 6–1

=== Mixed doubles ===
(United Kingdom) Randolph Lycett / (United States) Elizabeth Ryan defeated (India) Lewis Deane / (United Kingdom) Dorothy Shepherd-Barron, 6–4, 7–5

Preceded by 1922 Australasian Championships	Grand Slams	Succeeded by 1923 Australasian Championships
