= Arthur Diemer Kool =

Dutch tennis player

- Country (sports): Netherlands
- Born: 30 January 1896; Paramaribo, Suriname
- Died: 3 October 1959 (aged 63); Saint-Jorioz, France

Singles

Grand Slam singles results
- Wimbledon: 3R (1921)

Doubles

Grand Slam doubles results
- Wimbledon: 3R (1921)

Grand Slam mixed doubles results
- Wimbledon: 1R (1921)

Arthur Diemer Kool (30 January 1896 – 3 October 1959) was a Dutch tennis player.

He won the singles title at the Dutch Tennis Championships in 1912 aged 16 and won the title again in 1915, 1916 and 1917. With Gerard Scheurleer he became doubles champion in 1914, 1915 and with Christiaan van Lennep in 1916 and 1923. Diemer Kool won the national mixed doubles title in 1914, 1916 and 1917.

He played in 15 ties for the Dutch Davis Cup team between 1920 and 1933 and compiled a 25–13 win-loss record.

Diemer Kool participated in the 1921 Wimbledon Championships where he reached the third round in the singles event in which he lost to André Gobert in four sets. In the doubles event he partnered Christiaan van Lennep and also reached the third round, losing to Alfred Beamish and Frank Fisher.

== Personal life ==
On 18 July 1918 he married tennis player Marie Bernardien de Bloeme in The Hague and they had five daughters.
