= 1923 Wimbledon Championships – Women's singles =

Women's singles
- 1923 Wimbledon Championships

Final
- Champion: (France) Suzanne Lenglen
- Runner-up: (United Kingdom) Kitty McKane
- Score: 6–2, 6–2

Details
- Draw: 70
- Seeds: –

Events
Singles	men	women		boys	girls
Doubles	men	women	mixed	boys	girls
← 1922 ·	Wimbledon Championships	· 1924 →

Defending champion Suzanne Lenglen defeated Kitty McKane 6–2, 6–2 in the final to win the ladies' singles tennis title at the 1923 Wimbledon Championships.

== Draw ==
=== Key ===
- Q = Qualifier
- WC = Wild card
- LL = Lucky loser
- Alt = Alternate
- SE = Special exempt
- PR = Protected ranking
- ITF = ITF entry
- JE = Junior exempt
- w/o = Walkover
- r = Retired
- d = Defaulted
- SR = Special ranking

=== Finals ===
Quarterfinals
(France) Suzanne Lenglen	6	6
(United Kingdom) Marie Hazel	2	1
(United States) Molla Mallory	6	5	4
(United Kingdom) Winifred Beamish	4	7	6
(United Kingdom) Kitty McKane	6	6
(United States) Eleanor Goss	2	2
(United Kingdom) Eleanor Rose	0	0
(United States) Elizabeth Ryan	6	6

Semifinals
(France) Suzanne Lenglen	6	6
(United Kingdom) Winifred Beamish	0	0
(United Kingdom) Kitty McKane	1	6	6
(United States) Elizabeth Ryan	6	2	4

Final
(France) Suzanne Lenglen	6	6
(United Kingdom) Kitty McKane	2	2

=== Top half ===
==== Section 1 ====
First round

Second round
(France) Suzanne Lenglen	6	6
(United Kingdom) Peggy Ingram	0	0
(United Kingdom) Peggy Dransfield	4	2
(United Kingdom) Phyllis Covell	6	6
(South Africa) L McArthur	6	5	6
(Belgium) LR Grisar	2	7	2
(France) Julie Vlasto	6	6
(Republic of Ireland) Mrs RRW Jackson	2	3

Third round
(France) S Lenglen	6	6
(United Kingdom) P Covell	0	3
(South Africa) L McArthur	2	0
(France) J Vlasto	6	6

Fourth round
(France) S Lenglen	6	6
(France) J Vlasto	1	0

==== Section 2 ====
First round

Second round
(Netherlands) Kea Bouman	0	3
(United Kingdom) Mrs MB Reckitt	6	6
(United Kingdom) Mrs Perrett	4	1
(United Kingdom) Annie Cobb	6	6
(United Kingdom) Phyllis Satterthwaite	6	0	6
(United Kingdom) Dorothy Holman	1	6	2
(United Kingdom) Marie Hazel	2	6	6
(United Kingdom) Mrs Bruce-May	6	1	4

Third round
(United Kingdom) Mrs MB Reckitt	6	6
(United Kingdom) A Cobb	2	2
(United Kingdom) P Satterthwaite	14	2	3
(United Kingdom) M Hazel	12	6	6

Fourth round
(United Kingdom) Mrs MB Reckitt	w/o
(United Kingdom) M Hazel

==== Section 3 ====
First round

Second round
(United Kingdom) HL Eddis	3	2
(United States) Molla Mallory	6	6
(United Kingdom) Molly Welsh	2	9	4
(United Kingdom) Aurea Edgington	6	7	6
(United Kingdom) Mrs WL Hollick	6	6
(United Kingdom) Joan Reid-Thomas	2	2
(United Kingdom) Violet Pinckney	9	2	5
(United Kingdom) Kathleen Lidderdale	7	6	7

Third round
(United States) M Mallory	6	6
(United Kingdom) A Edgington	4	0
(United Kingdom) Mrs WL Hollick	6	3
(United Kingdom) K Lidderdale	8	6

Fourth round
(United States) M Mallory	6	6
(United Kingdom) K Lidderdale	3	3

==== Section 4 ====
First round
(United Kingdom) Mary McIlquham	6	0	6
(United States) Leslie Bancroft	2	6	8
(United States) Martha Bayard	6	6
(United Kingdom) L Cadle	0	4
(United Kingdom) Enid Clarke	7	3	6
(United Kingdom) C Rimington	5	6	1

Second round
(United Kingdom) Louise Bull	5	1
(United Kingdom) Mrs HB Weston	7	6
(United Kingdom) Joan Hextall	3	2
(United Kingdom) Winifred Beamish	6	6
(United Kingdom) M Parton	7	0
(United States) L Bancroft	9	6
(United States) M Bayard	3	4
(United Kingdom) E Clarke	6	6

Third round
(United Kingdom) Mrs HB Weston	2	2
(United Kingdom) W Beamish	6	6
(United States) L Bancroft	4	6	4
(United Kingdom) E Clarke	6	1	6

Fourth round
(United Kingdom) W Beamish	6	6
(United Kingdom) E Clarke	0	1

=== Bottom half ===
==== Section 5 ====
First round
(United Kingdom) KM Marriott	6	2	3
(United Kingdom) Ariadne Rodocanachi	2	6	6
(France) Germaine Golding	w/o
(United Kingdom) Mrs Gunter
(United Kingdom) Kitty McKane	6	6
(United States) Katherine Gardner	1	0

Second round
(United Kingdom) A Rodocanachi	1	6	11
(United Kingdom) Mrs Gunter	6	4	9
(United Kingdom) K McKane	6	6
(United Kingdom) Phoebe Holcroft	1	2
(United Kingdom) E McDonald	3	1
(United Kingdom) Mabel Clayton	6	6
(United Kingdom) Honor Woolrych	7	2^{r}
(United Kingdom) Sylvia Lumley-Ellis	5	1

Third round
(United Kingdom) A Rodocanachi	0	1
(United Kingdom) K McKane	6	6
(United Kingdom) M Clayton	6	6
(United Kingdom) S Lumley-Ellis	1	3

Fourth round
(United Kingdom) K McKane	6	6
(United Kingdom) M Clayton	4	1

==== Section 6 ====
First round

Second round
(United Kingdom) Evelyn Colyer	3	6	4
(United Kingdom) Vera Youle	6	0	6
(United States) Eleanor Goss	6	6
(United Kingdom) Weeta Donaldson	4	1
(United Kingdom) EM Beckingham	6	6
(United Kingdom) SM Fison	3	4
(United Kingdom) Enid Head	0	3
(United Kingdom) Blanche Colston	6	6

Third round
(United Kingdom) V Youle	6	4
(United States) E Goss	8	6
(United Kingdom) EM Beckingham
(United Kingdom) B Colston	w/o

Fourth round
(United States) E Goss	6	6
(United Kingdom) EM Beckingham	2	2

==== Section 7 ====
First round

Second round
(United Kingdom) JL Mumford	2	3
(France) Elizabeth Macready	6	6
(United Kingdom) FM Haldane	3	7	6
(United Kingdom) CJ Tyrrell	6	5	2
(United Kingdom) Mrs IFL Elliot	7	3	6
(United Kingdom) Joan Austin	5	6	8
(United Kingdom) Claire Beckingham	4	0
(United Kingdom) Eleanor Rose	6	6

Third round
(France) E Macready	0	0
(United Kingdom) FM Haldane	6	6
(United Kingdom) J Austin	6	0
(United Kingdom) E Rose	8	6

Fourth round
(United Kingdom) FM Haldane	6	2	7
(United Kingdom) E Rose	4	6	9

==== Section 8 ====
First round

Second round
(United Kingdom) Mrs GB Goodes	0	1
(United States) Elizabeth Ryan	6	6
(United Kingdom) Doris Craddock	9	6
(United Kingdom) JL Colegate	7	3
(United Kingdom) Ermyntrude Harvey	6	6
(United Kingdom) Norah Middleton	4	2
(United States) Eleonora Sears	3	2
(United Kingdom) Dorothy Shepherd-Barron	6	6

Third round
(United States) E Ryan	6	6
(United Kingdom) D Craddock	1	4
(United Kingdom) E Harvey	6	3
(United Kingdom) D Shepherd-Barron	8	6

Fourth round
(United States) E Ryan	6	6
(United Kingdom) D Shepherd-Barron	1	1

Preceded by 1923 Australasian Championships – Women's singles	Grand Slam women's singles	Succeeded by 1923 U.S. National Championships – Women's singles
