= 1921 Wimbledon Championships =

- Date: 20 June – 2 July
- Edition: 41st
- Category: Grand Slam
- Surface: Grass
- Location: Worple Road; SW19, Wimbledon, London, United Kingdom
- Venue: All England Lawn Tennis and Croquet Club

Champions

Men's singles
- (United States) Bill Tilden

Women's singles
- (France) Suzanne Lenglen

Men's doubles
- (United Kingdom) Randolph Lycett / (United Kingdom) Max Woosnam

Women's doubles
- (France) Suzanne Lenglen / (United States) Elizabeth Ryan

Mixed doubles
- (United Kingdom) Randolph Lycett / (United States) Elizabeth Ryan
- Wimbledon Championships

The 1921 Wimbledon Championships took place on the outdoor grass courts at the All England Lawn Tennis and Croquet Club in Wimbledon, London, United Kingdom. The tournament ran from 20 June until 2 July. It was the 41st staging of the Wimbledon Championships and the first Grand Slam tennis event of 1921.

It was the last Wimbledon Championships held at the original Worple Road location, and it was also the last time the challenge round system was used at Wimbledon. From 1922 onward, the reigning champion would no longer play a single match, the Challenge Round, against the winner of the all-comers tournament to decide the championship but, like every other player, would have to play from the beginning of the tournament.

== Finals ==
=== Men's singles ===
(United States) Bill Tilden defeated (South Africa) Brian Norton, 4–6, 2–6, 6–1, 6–0, 7–5

=== Women's singles ===
(France) Suzanne Lenglen defeated (United States) Elizabeth Ryan, 6–2, 6–0

=== Men's doubles ===
(United Kingdom) Randolph Lycett / (United Kingdom) Max Woosnam defeated (United Kingdom) Arthur Lowe / (United Kingdom) Gordon Lowe, 6–3, 6–0, 7–5

=== Women's doubles ===
(France) Suzanne Lenglen / (United States) Elizabeth Ryan defeated (United Kingdom) Winifred Beamish / (South Africa) Irene Peacock, 6–1, 6–2

=== Mixed doubles ===
(United Kingdom) Randolph Lycett / (United States) Elizabeth Ryan defeated (United Kingdom) Max Woosnam / (United Kingdom) Phyllis Howkins, 6–3, 6–1

Preceded by 1920 U.S. National Championships	Grand Slams	Succeeded by 1921 U.S. National Championships
