= Manuel de Gomar =

Spanish tennis player (1897–1935)

- Full name: Manuel Pérez Seoane y Fernández de Salamanca, Conde de Gomar
- Country (sports): Spain
- Born: 29 September 1897; Madrid, Spain
- Died: January 1935 (aged 37); Madrid
- Retired: 1923

Singles

Grand Slam singles results
- Wimbledon: QF (1923)

Other tournaments
- WHCC: F (1922)
- WCCC: SF (1923)

Doubles

Grand Slam doubles results
- Wimbledon: F (1923)

Team competitions
- Davis Cup: F (1922)

Manuel de Gomar (Spanish pronunciation: [ma'nwel de 'gomaɾ]; 21 September 1897 – January 1935) was a Spanish tennis player active mainly at the beginning of the 1920s.

== Biography ==
Count de Gomar, a member of Atlético Madrid, won the Spanish tennis championships from 1916 to 1918. In 1922 and 1923, he played at the Wimbledon Championships. While he dropped out of the competition early in his first year, he was able to reach the quarterfinals in singles in 1923 which he lost to Frank Hunter in five sets. In doubles, he reached the final along with his compatriot Eduardo Flaquer but lost to British Randolph Lycett and Leslie Godfree 3–6, 4–6, 6–3 and 3–6.

In 1922, de Gomar reached the final of the World Hard Court Championships at Brussels which he lost to Henri Cochet in five sets.

From 1921 to 1923, de Gomar was a member of the first Spanish Davis Cup team. In 1922, he reached the final along with Manuel Alonso. The two were called "Los Dos Manolos" ("the two Manuels"), a reference to "Big Bill" Tilden and "Little Bill" Johnston, another pair of famous tennis player at the time. In the final against the Australian Davis Cup team, however, de Gomar lost all his matches and the Spanish team subsequently lost 1–4.

In 1923, de Gomar had to retire from tennis because of an illness of which he eventually died in early 1935. He was buried at Madrid's San Isidro cemetery.

== Grand Slam finals ==
=== Doubles (1 runner-up) ===
Result	Year	Championship	Surface	Partner	Opponents	Score
Loss	1923	Wimbledon	Grass	(Spain) Eduardo Flaquer	(United Kingdom) Leslie Godfree (United Kingdom) Randolph Lycett	3–6, 4–6, 6–3, 3–6
