= Lewis Deane =

Anglo-Indian tennis player (1882–1934)

- Full name: Lewis Seymour Deane
- Country (sports): British India
- Born: 12 March 1882
- Died: 18 December 1934 (aged 52)

Singles

Grand Slam singles results
- Wimbledon: 1R (1911, 1921, 1923)

Doubles

Grand Slam doubles results
- Wimbledon: SF (1921, 1923)

Grand Slam mixed doubles results
- Wimbledon: F (1923)

Lewis Seymour Deane (12 March 1882 – 18 December 1934) was an Anglo-Indian tennis player.

Born in Meerut, Deane was the second son of British Indian Army captain George Deane of the Bengal Lancers.

Deane, a champion of Bengal and Punjab, played in India's first ever Davis Cup team in 1921, with the side going through to the semi-finals. He twice reached the Wimbledon men's doubles semi-finals (with Sydney Jacob in 1921 & Hassan Ali Fyzee in 1923) and was a mixed doubles finalist at the 1923 Wimbledon Championships.

== Grand Slam finals ==
=== Mixed doubles: 1 (1 runner-up) ===
Result	Year	Championship	Surface	Partner	Opponents	Score
Loss	1923	Wimbledon	Grass	(United Kingdom) Dorothy Shepherd-Barron	(United States) Elizabeth Ryan (United Kingdom) Randolph Lycett	4–6, 5–7

== See also ==
- List of India Davis Cup team representatives
