= Dorothy Shepherd-Barron =

English tennis player

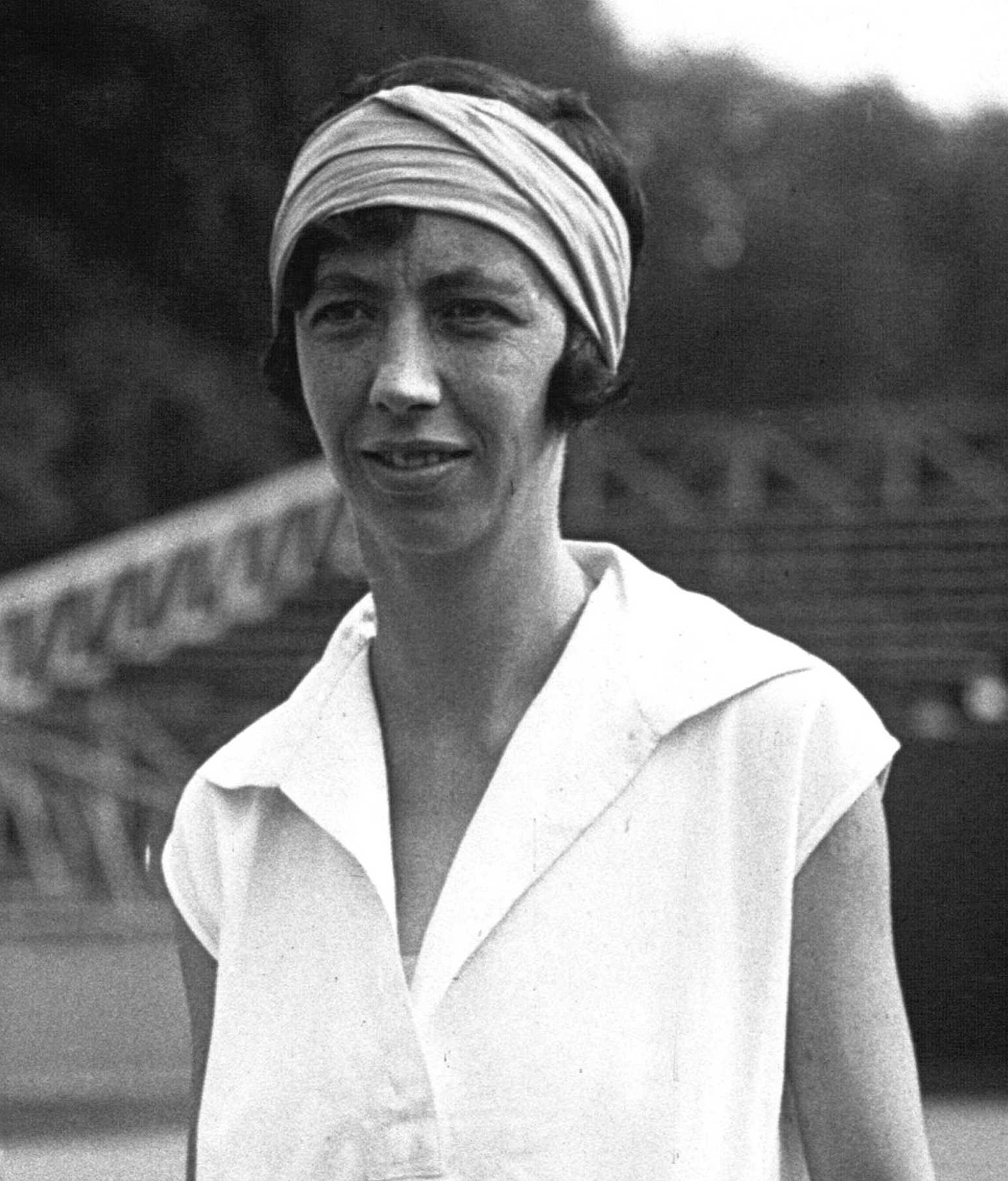
- Full name: Dorothy Cunliffe Shepherd-Barron
- Country (sports): Great Britain
- Born: 24 November 1897; Beighton, England
- Died: 20 February 1953 (aged 55); Melbourn, England

Singles

Grand Slam singles results
- French Open: 2R (1926)
- Wimbledon: QF (1921, 1924)
- US Open: QF (1931)

Doubles

Grand Slam doubles results
- Wimbledon: W (1931)
- US Open: F (1929)

Grand Slam mixed doubles results
- Wimbledon: F (1923, 1924, 1934)

Team competitions
- Wightman Cup: W (1924)
Medal record
Olympic Games
Bronze medal – third place	1924 Paris	Doubles

Dorothy Shepherd-Barron (née Cunliffe; 24 November 1897 – 20 February 1953) was a tennis player from Great Britain who competed in the 1924 Summer Olympics.

== Tennis career ==
At the 1924 Summer Olympics she teamed with Evelyn Colyer to win a bronze medal in the women's doubles event. In the singles event, she reached the quarterfinals, losing to Julie Vlasto.

Between 1920 and 1939, she participated in 15 editions of the Wimbledon Championships. In the singles event, her best result was reaching the quarterfinals in 1921 (losing to Mabel Clayton) and 1924 (losing to Phyllis Satterthwaite. She reached the final of the Wimbledon doubles event in 1929 with Phyllis Howkins Covell, losing in straight sets to compatriots Peggy Saunders Michell and Phoebe Holcroft Watson, a result that was repeated in the final of the U.S. National Championships. Two years later, in 1931, she and partner Phyllis Mudford King won the doubles title, defeating Doris Metaxa Howard and Josane Sigart in three sets.

In mixed doubles, she was a Grand Slam finalist on four occasions, partnering Lewis Deane, Leslie Godfree and Bunny Austin.

== Personal life ==
On 23 September 1921, she married engineer Wilfred Shepherd-Barron in Bombay, India. One of their sons is John Shepherd-Barron, credited as the inventor of the ATM, and their youngest son, Richard Shepherd-Barron, was a racing driver in the 1950s and 1960s, finishing 13th overall at the 1962 Le Mans race. She died in a car accident in Cambridgeshire on 20 February 1953.

== Grand Slam finals ==
=== Doubles: 3 (1 title, 2 runner-ups) ===
Result	Year	Championship	Surface	Partner	Opponents	Score
Loss	1929	Wimbledon	Grass	(United Kingdom) Phyllis Howkins Covell	(United Kingdom) Peggy Michell (United Kingdom) Phoebe Holcroft Watson	6–4, 8–6
Loss	1929	U.S. Championships	Grass	(United Kingdom) Phyllis Howkins Covell	(United Kingdom) Peggy Michell (United Kingdom) Phoebe Holcroft Watson	6–2, 3–6, 4–6
Win	1931	Wimbledon	Grass	(United Kingdom) Phyllis Mudford King	(France) Doris Metaxa (Belgium) Josane Sigart	3–6, 6–3, 6–4

=== Mixed doubles: 4 (4 runner-ups) ===
Result	Year	Championship	Surface	Partner	Opponents	Score
Loss	1923	Wimbledon	Grass	(British Raj) Lewis Deane	(United States) Elizabeth Ryan (United Kingdom) Randolph Lycett	4–6, 5–7
Loss	1924	Wimbledon	Grass	(United Kingdom) Leslie Godfree	(United Kingdom) Kitty McKane (United Kingdom) John Gilbert	3–6, 6–3, 3–6
Loss	1931	French Championships	Clay	(United Kingdom) Bunny Austin	(United Kingdom) Betty Nuthall (South Africa) Patrick Spence	3–6, 7–5, 3–6
Loss	1934	Wimbledon	Grass	(United Kingdom) Bunny Austin	(United Kingdom) Dorothy Round (Japan) Tatsuyoshi Miki	6–3, 4–6, 0–6
