= William Alfred Ingram =

British tennis player

Alfred Ingram
- Full name: William Alfred Ingram
- Country (sports): United Kingdom
- Born: 1876 Newbury, Berkshire, United Kingdom
- Died: 30 December 1944 (aged 68) Newbury, Berkshire, United Kingdom
- Turned pro: 1901 (amateur tour)
- Retired: 1934

Singles
- Career record: 44-27
- Career titles: 7

Grand Slam singles results
- Wimbledon: QF (1913)

Grand Slam doubles results
- Wimbledon: QF (1920, 1923)

Grand Slam mixed doubles results
- Wimbledon: 3R (1925)

Alfred Ingram (1876–1944) was a British tennis player in the years before and after World war 1.

He played in the Wimbledon singles from 1912 to 1926. His best performance at Wimbledon was a quarter final in 1913 (where he lost to Maurice McLoughlin).

He won seven tournaments, including the 1910 Edmonton, where he defeated Hassan Ali Fyzee in the final.

He was runner-up at the 1909 Sussex Championships, where he defeated Stanley Doust (a world No. 8) and Arthur Davys Tuckey in the semifinal before losing the final to Robert Powell.

His daughter Peggy played at Wimbledon (Alfred and Peggy played mixed doubles together at Wimbledon).
