= Brian Norton (tennis) =

South African tennis player

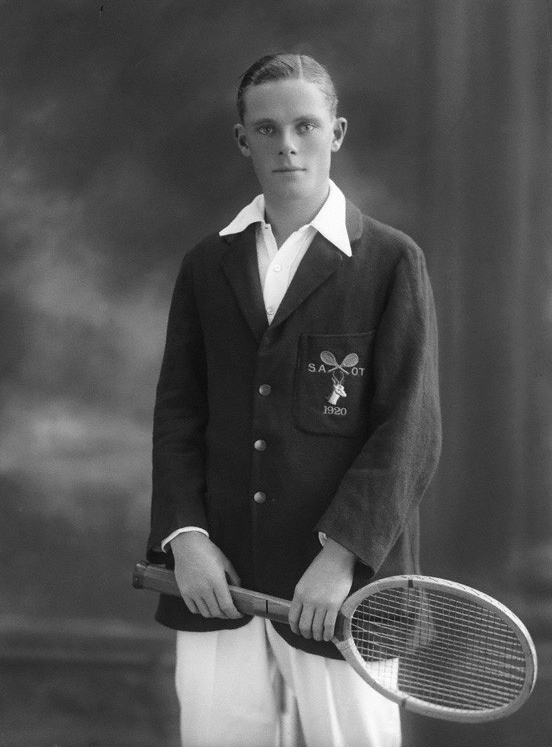
- Full name: Brian Ivan Cobb Norton
- Country (sports): South Africa
- Born: 10 October 1899; Robben Island, Cape Colony
- Died: 16 July 1956 (aged 56); Santa Clara, California, United States

Singles
- Highest ranking: No. 7 (1921, A. Wallis Myers)

Grand Slam singles results
- Wimbledon: F (1921^{Ch})
- US Open: SF (1923)

Other tournaments
- WHCC: 2R (1920, 1923)

Doubles

Grand Slam doubles results
- Wimbledon: SF (1921, 1922)
- US Open: W (1923)

Mixed doubles

Grand Slam mixed doubles results
- Wimbledon: SF (1920)

Brian Ivan Cobb Norton (10 October 1899 – 16 July 1956), nicknamed "Babe", was a South African tennis player. He was born in Cape Colony and died in Santa Clara, California. At Wimbledon 1921, Norton beat Frank Hunter and Manuel Alonso Areizaga, before having two championship points in the Challenge Round against Bill Tilden but losing in five sets. Norton is one of only two men to hold championship point in a Grand Slam men's singles final and yet not win a title (the other is Guillermo Coria at the 2004 French Open. Norton won the 1923 U.S. National Championships doubles, alongside Tilden. In the singles that year, Norton beat R. Norris Williams in a five-set quarterfinal, then lost to Tilden in the semifinals.

After Norton, the next South African citizen to reach the gentlemen's singles final at Wimbledon would be Kevin Anderson 97 years later in 2018. Although another South African-born tennis player, Kevin Curren, had reached the Wimbledon final in 1985 against Boris Becker (Germany), Curren played as a U.S. (American) citizen.

He competed in the singles and doubles events at the 1920 Summer Olympics. Norton was ranked World No. 7 by A. Wallis Myers of The Daily Telegraph in 1921 and 1922.

In 1921, he won the singles title at the South of England Championships after a five-set victory in the final against Mohammed Sleem.

== Grand Slam finals ==
=== Singles (1 runner-up) ===
Result	Year	Championship	Surface	Opponent	Score
Loss	1921	Championships	Grass	(United States) Bill Tilden	6–4, 6–2, 1–6, 0–6, 5–7

=== Doubles (1 title) ===
Result	Year	Championship	Surface	Partner	Opponents	Score
Win	1923	U.S. National Championships	Grass	(United States) Bill Tilden	(United States) Richard Williams (United States) Watson Washburn	3–6, 6–2, 6–3, 5–7, 6–2
