= Jack Hillyard =

English cricketer and tennis player

Major Jack Montagu Hillyard (2 January 1891 – 16 February 1983) played cricket for Harrow in Fowler's match in 1910, served in the British Army in the First World War, and became a moderately successful tennis player in the 1920s and 1930s.

== Early life ==
Hillyard was born in Harpenden, Hertfordshire, the son of Commander George Whiteside Hillyard and Blanche Bingley. His father won an Olympic gold medal for tennis in 1908, and his mother won the women's championship at Wimbledon six times between 1886 and 1900. His younger sister Marjorie was born in 1896, in the Hillyard's house "The Elms" in Thorpe Satchville, Leicestershire.

He attended Harrow School, and played in the Eton v Harrow cricket match twice. In 1909, he took 3 wickets; the following year, in the famous match that became known as "Fowler's match", he was Harrow's top scorer, reaching 62 runs in the first innings, and took 5 wickets, but against the odds Harrow lost to Eton.

Hillyard served in the Royal Field Artillery in the First World War, spending four years in France and reaching the rank of major. His father served in the Royal Navy.

== Tennis career ==
He played in the men's singles at Wimbledon from 1920 to 1930, and 1932 and 1934, reaching the third round in 1920, 1922 and 1923. He lost the final of the All England Plate in 1924 to Jack Condon, but won the Surrey Grass Court Championships that year. He also won the Romsey Open in 1920, beating B.V Harcourt in the final.

Hillyard achieved greater success in the doubles, where he was Riviera double champion with Erik Worm, and won the Monte Carlo Second Meeting in April 1921. He reached the quarter-finals at Wimbledon in both men's doubles and the mixed doubles in 1921, playing with Algernon Kingscote and Phyllis Satterthwaite respectively. He repeated the feat in 1923, playing with Gerald Sherwell and Satterthwaite again.

== Later life ==
Hillyard married writer Fabienne d'Avilla in 1945. She was the daughter of French author Léon Brethous-Lafargue and divorced wife of Pedro Frederico Vaz de Carvalhaes. She wrote under the names Francis D'Avilla and Evelyn Fabyan. She did not remarry after they were divorced, and died in 1980.

In 1952, he married Mary Penelope Colthurst, daughter of Sir Richard St John Jefferyes Colthurst, 8th Baronet. She had divorced first husband, Brigadier Godfrey John Hamilton, in 1942. She inherited Blarney Castle, and she died 1975.

Hillyard died at Blarney Castle, in County Cork, Ireland. He had no children.
