= Leslie Godfree =

English tennis player

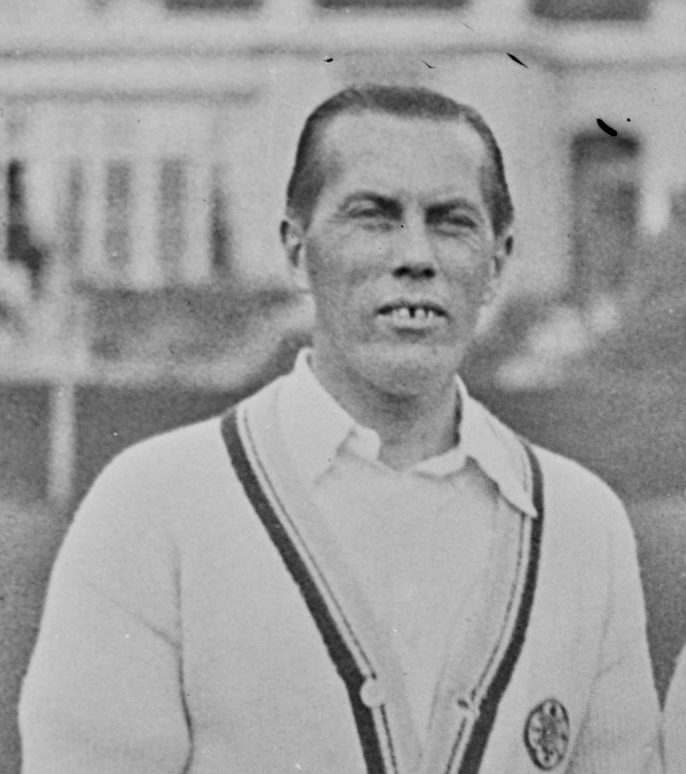
- Full name: Leslie Allison Godfree
- Country (sports): Great Britain
- Born: 27 April 1885; Brighton, Sussex, England
- Died: 17 November 1971 (aged 86); Richmond, London, England
- Plays: right-handed (one-handed backhand)

Singles

Grand Slam singles results
- French Open: 3R (1926)
- Wimbledon: 3R (1923)
- US Open: 1R (1930)

Doubles

Grand Slam doubles results
- French Open: 3R (1926)
- Wimbledon: W (1923)
- US Open: 2R (1930)
- Olympic Games: 1R (1924)

Mixed doubles

Grand Slam mixed doubles results
- French Open: SF (1926)
- Wimbledon: W (1926)
- US Open: QF (1930)
- Olympic Games: QF (1924)

Leslie Allison Godfree (27 April 1885 – 17 November 1971) was a British male tennis player who was especially successful in doubles and mixed doubles.

== Biography ==
Educated at Brighton College, Godfree played at the Wimbledon Championships from 1920 to 1930. While in singles he dropped out of the competition after the first or second round each year, he won the doubles title partnering Randolph Lycett in 1923. In January 1926, he married Kathleen McKane, a two time Wimbledon singles champion. In the same year, the newly married couple took the mixed doubles title at Wimbledon, being the only married couple ever to win this championship. Leslie had already reached the mixed doubles final two years earlier in 1924 where he was beaten by his future wife Kitty, and the couple would again in 1927.

Apart from Wimbledon, the Godfrees played at the French Championships in 1926 where they could advance to the semifinals in mixed doubles. In 1930, Godfree took part at the U.S. Championships where he reached the quarterfinals in mixed doubles, this time partnering Mercedes Malowe.

He was also member of the British Davis Cup team from 1923 to 1927 and competed at the 1924 Summer Olympics in Paris.

== Grand Slam finals ==
=== Doubles (1 title) ===
Result	Year	Championship	Surface	Partner	Opponents	Score
Win	1923	Wimbledon	Grass	(United Kingdom) Randolph Lycett	(Spain) Manuel de Gomar (Spain) Eduardo Flaquer	6–3, 6–4, 3–6, 6–3

=== Mixed doubles: (1 title, 2 runners-up) ===
Result	Year	Championship	Surface	Partner	Opponents	Score
Loss	1924	Wimbledon	Grass	(United Kingdom) Dorothy Shepherd-Barron	(United Kingdom) Kitty McKane (United Kingdom) John Gilbert	3–6, 6–3, 3–6
Win	1926	Wimbledon	Grass	(United Kingdom) Kitty Godfree	(United States) Mary Kendall Browne (United States) Howard Kinsey	6–3, 6–4
Loss	1927	Wimbledon	Grass	(United Kingdom) Kitty Godfree	(United States) Elizabeth Ryan (United States) Frank Hunter	6–8, 0–6
