= Randolph Lycett =

English tennis player

- Full name: Randolph Lycett
- Country (sports): Australia; United Kingdom
- Born: 27 August 1886; Birmingham, England
- Died: 9 February 1935 (aged 48); Jersey, United Kingdom
- Height: 1.73 m (5 ft 8 in)
- Turned pro: 1905 (amateur tour)
- Retired: 1929
- Plays: Right-handed (one-handed backhand)

Singles
- Career record: 185–68 (73.1%)
- Career titles: 16

Grand Slam singles results
- Australian Open: SF (1905)
- Wimbledon: F (1922)
- US Open: 2R (1919)

Doubles

Grand Slam doubles results
- Australian Open: W (1905, 1911)
- Wimbledon: W (1921, 1922, 1923)

Grand Slam mixed doubles results
- Wimbledon: W (1919, 1921, 1923)

Team competitions
- Davis Cup: QF (1921)

Randolph Lycett (27 August 1886 – 9 February 1935) was a British tennis player. Lycett is primarily known for his success in doubles, winning 5 men's doubles and 3 mixed doubles slams. He was also the runner-up at the 1922 Wimbledon men's singles (where he lost to Gerald Patterson).

Lycett was recognised as one of the dominant players in men's doubles. He was the champion at both the Australasian Championships and Wimbledon multiple times. In April 1924 he won the singles title at the inaugural British Hard Court Championships in Torquay defeating Christiaan van Lennep in the final in four sets. He played in three ties for the British Davis Cup team in 1921 and 1923 and compiled a record of six wins and three losses.

His cousin was the operatic soprano Miriam Licette.

In the 1921 Wimbledon Quarter Final, Randolph Lycett played Zenzo Shimizu on a very hot day. During the third set, Lycett was revived with gin each time Ends were changed. In the Fifth Set, he ordered a bottle of champagne, and was drinking it when the Umpire announced "Shimizu leads by nine games to eight in the Final Set". Lycett dropped his racket, and began to search for it on his hands and knees.

== Grand Slam finals ==
=== Singles: 1 runner-up ===
Result	Year	Championship	Surface	Opponent	Score
Loss	1922	Wimbledon	Grass	(Australia) Gerald Patterson	3–6, 4–6, 2–6

=== Doubles: 6 (5 titles, 1 runner-up) ===
Result	Year	Championship	Surface	Partner	Opponents	Score
Win	1905	Australasian Championships	Grass	(Australia) Tom Tachell	(Australia) Edgar T. Barnard (Australia) Basil Spence	11–9, 8–6, 1–6, 4–6, 6–1
Win	1911	Australasian Championships	Grass	(Australia) Rodney Heath	(Australia) John Addison (Australia) Norman Brookes	6–2, 7–5, 6–0
Loss	1919	Wimbledon	Grass	(United States) Rodney Heath	(Australia) Pat O'Hara Wood (Australia) Ronald Thomas	4–6, 2–6, 6–4, 2–6
Win	1921	Wimbledon	Grass	(Australia) Max Woosnam	(United Kingdom of Great Britain and Ireland) Arthur Lowe (United Kingdom of Great Britain and Ireland) Gordon Lowe	6–3, 6–0, 7–5
Win	1922	Wimbledon	Grass	(Australia) James Anderson	(Australia) Pat O'Hara Wood (Australia) Gerald Patterson	3–6, 7–9, 6–4, 6–3, 11–9
Win	1923	Wimbledon	Grass	(United Kingdom of Great Britain and Ireland) Leslie Godfree	(Spain) Eduardo Flaquer (Spain) Manuel de Gomar	6–3, 6–4, 3–6, 6–3

=== Mixed doubles: 5 (3 titles, 2 runners-up) ===
Result	Year	Championship	Surface	Partner	Opponents	Score
Win	1919	Wimbledon	Grass	(United States) Elizabeth Ryan	(United Kingdom) Dorothea Lambert Chambers (United Kingdom) Albert Prebble	6–0, 6–0
Loss	1920	Wimbledon	Grass	(United States) Elizabeth Ryan	(France) Suzanne Lenglen (Australia) Gerald Patterson	7–5, 6–3
Win	1921	Wimbledon	Grass	(United States) Elizabeth Ryan	(United Kingdom) Phyllis Howkins (United Kingdom) Max Woosnam	6–3, 6–1
Loss	1922	Wimbledon	Grass	(United States) Elizabeth Ryan	(France) Suzanne Lenglen (Australia) Pat O'Hara Wood	6–4, 6–3
Win	1923	Wimbledon	Grass	(United States) Elizabeth Ryan	(United Kingdom) Dorothy Shepherd Barron (British Raj) Lewis Deane	6–4, 7–5
