= Francis Hunter =

American tennis player (1894–1981)

Frank Hunter
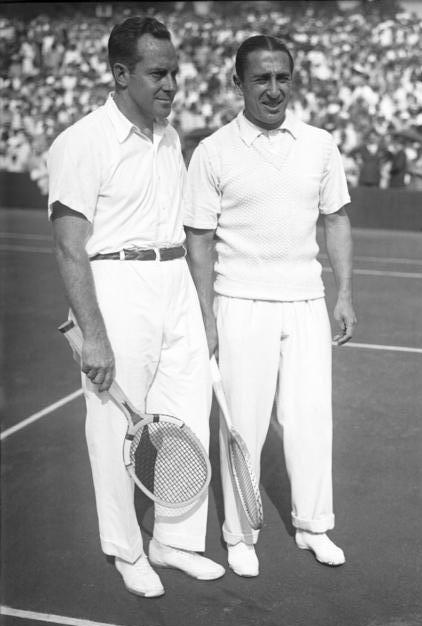
- Francis Hunter (left) with Daniel Prenn, 1929
- Full name: Francis Townsend Hunter
- Country (sports): United States
- Born: June 28, 1894 New York, New York, U.S.
- Died: December 2, 1981 (aged 87) Palm Beach, Florida, U.S.
- Turned pro: 1931 (amateur tour from 1915)
- Retired: 1944
- Plays: Right-handed (1-handed backhand)
- Int. Tennis HoF: 1961 (member page)

Singles
- Career record: 480-152 (75.9%)
- Career titles: 24
- Highest ranking: No. 4 (1929, A. Wallis Myers)

Grand Slam singles results
- French Open: QF (1929)
- Wimbledon: F (1923)
- US Open: F (1928, 1929)

Other tournaments
- Professional majors
- US Pro: F (1933)

Doubles
- Career record: no value

Grand Slam doubles results
- Wimbledon: W (1924, 1927)
- US Open: W (1927)

Grand Slam mixed doubles results
- French Open: F (1928, 1929)
- Wimbledon: W (1927, 1929)
Medal record
Olympic Games – Tennis
Gold medal – first place	1924 Paris	Doubles

Francis "Frank" Townsend Hunter (June 28, 1894 – December 2, 1981) was an American tennis player who won an Olympic gold medal. He won the U.S. National Indoor Championships in 1922 and 1930 and the Eastern Clay Court Championships in 1919.

== Early and personal life ==
Hunter graduated from Cornell University in 1916, where he was a member of the Quill and Dagger society, the ice hockey team, and the Alpha-Kappa Chapter of the Kappa Sigma Fraternity.

During WWI he was a lieutenant commander in the U.S. Navy and served on Admiral Beatty's flagship of the British Royal Navy. He later wrote a book about his experiences with the Admiral.

Hunter was the second husband of the actress Lisette Verea in 1954.

Hunter was later successful in the coal and printing industries.

== Tennis career ==
Hunter set a one-day record by winning five matches in singles, 1920. They were all straight-set victories and came in two different New York tournaments.

Hunter won the U.S. National Indoor Championships in 1922 and again in 1930 and the Eastern Clay Court Championships in 1919.

He was a singles finalist at Wimbledon in 1923 (where he beat Gordon Lowe, then lost to Bill Johnston).

Hunter won a gold medal at the 1924 Paris Olympics, in the men's doubles event with partner Vincent Richards.

He won the Scheveningen Championships on red clay in the Netherlands in 1928 defeating Hendrik Timmer in the semifinal in four sets and Jean Borotra in the final in three straight sets.

Hunter reached the U.S. championships singles final in 1928 (where he beat Jack Crawford and George Lott, then lost to Henri Cochet in five sets).

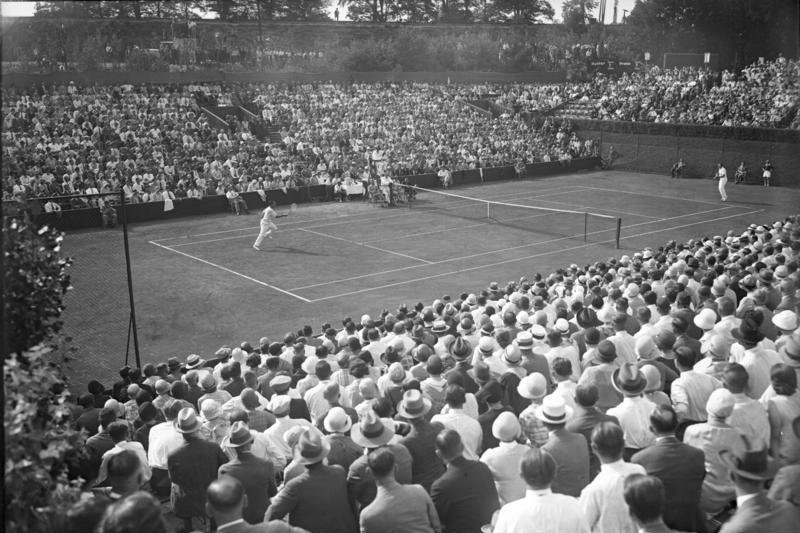
German Daniel Prenn (left) and Hunter (right), in a Davis Cup match in Berlin in 1929

He reached his third Grand Slam singles final at the U.S. championships in 1929 where he beat R. Norris Williams, losing the final in five sets to Bill Tilden.

He was ranked World No. 4 in 1929 by A. Wallis Myers of The Daily Telegraph and World No. 5 in another Myers list in September the same year.

Hunter won the Brooklyn Indoor Championships in 1930 defeating J. Gilbert Hall in the semifinal.

Hunter turned professional in mid January 1931 joining Bill Tilden. He reached the final of the U.S. Pro Championships in 1933 where he lost to Vincent Richards. As well as playing on the pro tour, Hunter was also a promoter, including promoting the first Perry-Vines tour in 1937 with S. Howard Voshell.

== Grand Slam finals ==
=== Singles: 3 runners-up ===
Result	Year	Championship	Surface	Opponent	Score
Loss	1923	Wimbledon	Grass	(United States) Bill Johnston	0–6, 3–6, 1–6
Loss	1928	U.S. National Championships	Grass	(France) Henri Cochet	6–4, 4–6, 6–3, 5–7, 3–6
Loss	1929	U.S. National Championships	Grass	(United States) Bill Tilden	6–3, 3–6, 6–4, 2–6, 4–6

=== Doubles: 3 titles ===
Result	Year	Championship	Surface	Partner	Opponents	Score
Win	1924	Wimbledon	Grass	(United States) Vincent Richards	(United States) Watson Washburn (United States) R. Norris Williams	6−3, 3−6, 8−10, 8−6, 6−3
Win	1927	Wimbledon	Grass	(United States) Bill Tilden	(France) Jacques Brugnon (France) Henri Cochet	1–6, 4–6, 8–6, 6–3, 6–4
Win	1927	U.S. National Championships	Grass	(United States) Bill Tilden	(United States) R. Norris Williams (United States) Bill Johnston	10–8, 6–3, 6–3

=== Mixed doubles: 4 (2 titles, 2 runners-up) ===
Result	Year	Championship	Surface	Partner	Opponents	Score
Win	1927	Wimbledon	Grass	(United States) Elizabeth Ryan	(United Kingdom) Kathleen McKane Godfree (United Kingdom) Leslie Godfree	8–6, 6–0
Loss	1928	French Championships	Clay	(United States) Helen Wills	(United Kingdom) Eileen Bennett (France) Henri Cochet	6–3, 3–6, 3–6
Loss	1929	French Championships	Clay	(United States) Helen Wills	(United Kingdom) Eileen Bennett (France) Henri Cochet	3–6, 2–6
Win	1929	Wimbledon	Grass	(United States) Helen Wills	(United Kingdom) Joan Fry (United Kingdom) Ian Collins	6–1, 6–4
