= Max Woosnam =

English football and tennis player

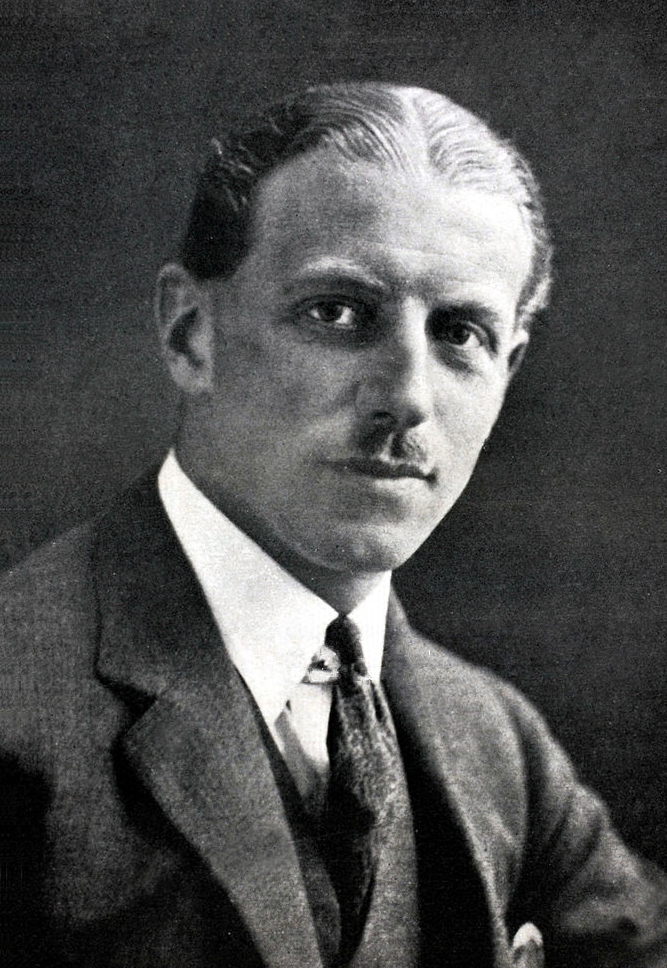
- Woosnam in 1920
- Full name: Maxwell Woosnam
- Country (sports): Great Britain
- Born: 6 September 1892 Liverpool, England
- Died: 14 July 1965 (aged 72) London, England

Grand Slam singles results
- Wimbledon: QF (1923)

Other tournaments
- Olympic Games: 2R (1920)

Grand Slam doubles results
- Wimbledon: W (1921)

Grand Slam mixed doubles results
- Wimbledon: F (1921)
Medal record
Representing United Kingdom
Olympic Games – Tennis
Gold medal – first place	1920 Antwerp	Doubles
Silver medal – second place	1920 Antwerp	Mixed doubles

Max Woosnam
Personal information
- Height: 5 ft 10 1/2 in (1.79 m)
- Position: Centre half

Senior career*
Years	Team	Apps	(Gls)
1914–1919	Corinthian	17	(9)
1914	Chelsea	3	(0)
1919–1925	Manchester City	96	(5)
1924–1926	Northwich Victoria	?	(0)

International career
1921-1922	England Amateurs	2	(0)
1922	England	1	(0)
- * Club domestic league appearances and goals

Maxwell Woosnam (6 September 1892 – 14 July 1965) was a British sportsman who is sometimes referred to as the 'Greatest British sportsman' in recognition of his achievements.

Among his achievements were winning an Olympic gold and silver in tennis at the 1920 Summer Olympics, winning the doubles at Wimbledon, compiling a 147 break in snooker, making a century at Lord's Cricket Ground, captaining the British Davis Cup team, captaining Manchester City F.C. finishing ultimately runners-up for the Football League Championship in 1920–21, and captaining the England national football team.

== Background ==
Max Woosnam was born in Liverpool, the son of Maxwell Woosnam, a clergyman who served as canon of Chester Cathedral and Archdeacon of Macclesfield, and his wife Mary Seeley, daughter of Hilton Philipson. The Woosnam family were landed gentry, of Cefnllysgwynne, Brecknockshire, Wales, originally of Montgomeryshire. Woosnam spent most of his childhood in Aberhafesp, Mid Wales.

He attended Winchester College, where he captained the golf and cricket teams, and also represented the school at football and squash. As a schoolboy, he made scores of 144 and 33 not out for a Public Schools XI while playing against the Marylebone Cricket Club (MCC) at Lord's.

In 1911, Woosnam went up to Trinity College, Cambridge, representing Cambridge University at football, cricket, lawn tennis, real tennis and golf (being a scratch golfer), becoming a quadruple Blue.

In the First World War, Woosnam, who served with the Montgomeryshire Yeomanry and Royal Welsh Fusiliers, fought alongside Siegfried Sassoon on the western front and in the Gallipoli Campaign. Woosnam took part in a number of wartime sporting events, including football matches between a team of enlisted Corinthians players and Aldershot Command, and a Military vs Queen's Club tennis match.

== Corinthian FC ==
Straight from university, Woosnam was chosen for the Corinthian F.C. tour of Brazil in the summer of 1913. Managing the tour's first goal, against Rio de Janeiro, he also scored against Paulistano. In 1914, he again set sail with the Corinthians for Brazil; however this tour was cancelled when, still at sea, the side discovered war had been declared at home. The team decided to return to enlist. After a quick stop in Rio, allowing the players a brief walk around the town, they set sail for home. Dodging German U-boats and torpedo fire, they eventually made it back to England. It was Woosnam's last trip abroad with Corinthian FC. He remained with Corinthian for five years, as well as making a handful of appearances for Chelsea.

== Post-war ==
After the war, Woosnam continued his amateur sporting career, taking part in several sporting events. Woosnam was a finalist in the 1919 All England Plate tournament, a tennis competition held at the Wimbledon Championships, consisting of players who were defeated in the first or second rounds of the singles competition. Following a defeat of Woosnam while representing Cambridge University in a tennis match against Queen's Club in April 1919, the Times remarked that "Woosnam is a player of many games, and he could excel at tennis if he could devote enough time to the game... ...tennis is a mistress who must be constantly wooed." However, Woosnam continued to divide his attention; he played football for Chelsea either side of the Queen's Club match, captaining the team. His performance for Chelsea led to selection for a North versus South international trial match. Once the football season finished, Woosnam took part in several tennis tournaments. He won both the singles and doubles titles in the Cambridge University tournament, and entered Wimbledon for the first time. His tennis form in 1919 led The Times correspondent to describe his partnership with Noel Turnbull as a "doubles team of promise". Woosnam declined the opportunity to become a professional sportsman, finding the idea 'vulgar'.

== Manchester City ==
Upon moving to Manchester, he signed for Manchester City on amateur terms. He made his debut on 1 January 1920 against Bradford City, a match that also saw the debut of Sam Cookson. Initially he played only home matches due to other commitments. However, when Manchester City, without Woosnam, suffered a shock 3–0 FA Cup defeat to Leicester City at the end of the month, some supporters blamed Woosnam's employers, Crossley Brothers. As a result, the engineering firm ordered Woosnam not to miss another game.

Playing at centre half, Woosnam eventually became Manchester City captain at the recommendation of his teammates. This was highly unusual for an amateur among professionals. Eventually his success allowed him to play for England (both for the amateur team and as a full international as captain). Woosnam was also selected to captain the British football team at the Olympics, but refused, having already committed himself to the tennis team. He continued other sporting endeavours outside of football however, winning doubles titles at Wimbledon and the Olympics, and captaining the Great Britain Davis Cup team.

== Northwich Victoria ==
Woosnam had been working for chemical company ICI in Winnington, Northwich, and, while still being on Manchester City's books, he played for Winnington Park and then for Northwich Victoria in the Cheshire County League. He made his debut for Northwich on Christmas Day, 1924, in a derby match against Witton Albion, resulting in a 3–0 victory for Northwich. He sometimes captained the side, before ending his football career in February 1926 due to injuries and other commitments.

== Death and legacy ==
He was appointed to the board of ICI, and died in 1965 of respiratory failure, having been a heavy smoker all his life.

His life is chronicled in the book All Round Genius – The Unknown Story of Britain's Greatest Sportsman, by Mick Collins.

Woosnam's uncle, Hylton Philipson, was a cricketer and played five Test matches for England.

He once defeated actor and film director Charlie Chaplin at table tennis, playing with a butter knife instead of a bat.

Besides being a pioneer for table tennis, he was very accomplished at snooker, once achieving a maximum break of 147.

Jane Percy, Duchess of Northumberland, is Woosnam's sororal grandniece.

Woosnam had three children: Denise Woosnam who was engaged to Peter Pease, and a friend of Richard Hillary (Author of The Last Enemy); Max, and Penny.

== See also ==
- C. B. Fry, Cuthbert Ottaway and Alfred Lyttelton — three similar sporting polymaths.
