= 1928 Wimbledon Championships – Mixed doubles =

Mixed doubles
- 1928 Wimbledon Championships

Final
- Champions: (South Africa) Pat Spence (United States) Elizabeth Ryan
- Runners-up: (Australia) Jack Crawford (Australia) Daphne Akhurst
- Score: 7–5, 6–4

Details
- Draw: 64 (5 Q )
- Seeds: 4

Events
Singles	men	women		boys	girls
Doubles	men	women	mixed	boys	girls
← 1927 ·	Wimbledon Championships	· 1929 →

Frank Hunter and Elizabeth Ryan were the defending champions, but decided not to play together. Hunter partnered with Helen Wills, but lost in the semifinals to Ryan and her partner Pat Spence.

Spence and Ryan defeated Jack Crawford and Daphne Akhurst in the final, 7–5, 6–4 to win the mixed doubles tennis title at the 1928 Wimbledon Championships.

== Seeds ==
1. (France) Henri Cochet / (United Kingdom) Eileen Bennett (quarterfinals)
2. (South Africa) Pat Spence / (United States) Elizabeth Ryan (champions)
3. (United States) Frank Hunter / (United States) Helen Wills (semifinals)
4. (United Kingdom) Gordon Crole-Rees / (United Kingdom) Phoebe Watson (quarterfinals)

Click on the seed number of a player to go to their draw section.

== Draw ==
=== Key ===
- Q = Qualifier
- WC = Wild card
- LL = Lucky loser
- Alt = Alternate
- SE = Special exempt
- PR = Protected ranking
- ITF = ITF entry
- JE = Junior exempt
- w/o = Walkover
- r = Retired
- d = Defaulted
- SR = Special ranking

=== Finals ===
Quarterfinals
2	(South Africa) Pat Spence (United States) Elizabeth Ryan	6	6
(United Kingdom) Leslie Godfree (United Kingdom) Phyllis Covell	4	3
3	(United States) Frank Hunter (United States) Helen Wills	6	6
(Republic of Ireland) Charles Scroope (United Kingdom) Dorothy Shepherd-Barron	1	3
1	(France) Henri Cochet (United Kingdom) Eileen Bennett	10	4	3
(Australia) Jack Crawford (Australia) Daphne Akhurst	8	6	6
4	(United Kingdom) Gordon Crole-Rees (United Kingdom) Phoebe Watson	4	4
(Australia) Gar Moon (Australia) Meryl O'Hara Wood	6	6

Semifinals
2	(South Africa) Pat Spence (United States) Elizabeth Ryan	4	6	6
3	(United States) Frank Hunter (United States) Helen Wills	6	4	3
(Australia) Jack Crawford (Australia) Daphne Akhurst	6	7
(Australia) Gar Moon (Australia) Meryl O'Hara Wood	3	5

Final
2	(South Africa) Pat Spence (United States) Elizabeth Ryan	7	6
(Australia) Jack Crawford (Australia) Daphne Akhurst	5	4

=== Top half ===
==== Section 1 ====
First round
2	(South Africa) Pat Spence (United States) Elizabeth Ryan	6	6
(United Kingdom) Jack Hillyard (United Kingdom) Phyllis Satterthwaite	2	2
(France) Emmanuel du Plaix (United Kingdom) H Evelyn-Jones	10	2
(United States) John Hennessey (United States) Helen Jacobs	12	6
(United Kingdom) Douglas Hodges (United Kingdom) Joan Fry	6	6
(Austria) Franz Matejka (Austria) Lilly von Ellissen	4	1
Q	(United Kingdom) Harvey Mackintosh (United Kingdom) Elsa Haylock	5	6
(Argentina) Guillermo Robson (Netherlands) Mence Canters	7	8
(United Kingdom) JH Frowen (United Kingdom) Dorothy Shaw	6	3	7
(United Kingdom) Maurice Summerson (United Kingdom) R Watson	4	6	9
(United Kingdom) Edward Dearman (United Kingdom) Evelyn Dearman	6	2	6
(United Kingdom) HV Edwards (United Kingdom) Mrs HV Edwards	3	6	1
(United Kingdom) William Powell (United Kingdom) Sylvia Lumley-Ellis	9	2	6
(Switzerland) Hector Fisher (United Kingdom) Beatrice Brown	7	6	2
(United Kingdom) Leslie Godfree (United Kingdom) Phyllis Covell	4	6	6
(Germany) Feo Hartz (Germany) Irmgard Rost	6	3	0

Second round
2	(South Africa) P Spence (United States) E Ryan	6	6
(United States) J Hennessey (United States) H Jacobs	3	3
(United Kingdom) D Hodges (United Kingdom) J Fry	3	6	6
(Argentina) G Robson (Netherlands) M Canters	6	3	2
(United Kingdom) M Summerson (United Kingdom) R Watson	3	5
(United Kingdom) E Dearman (United Kingdom) E Dearman	6	7
(United Kingdom) W Powell (United Kingdom) S Lumley-Ellis	4	2
(United Kingdom) L Godfree (United Kingdom) P Covell	6	6

Third round
2	(South Africa) P Spence (United States) E Ryan	6	6
(Argentina) G Robson (Netherlands) M Canters	3	4
(United Kingdom) E Dearman (United Kingdom) E Dearman	1	2
(United Kingdom) L Godfree (United Kingdom) P Covell	6	6

Quarterfinals
2	(South Africa) P Spence (United States) E Ryan	6	6
(United Kingdom) L Godfree (United Kingdom) P Covell	4	3

==== Section 2 ====
First round
3	(United States) Frank Hunter (United States) Helen Wills	6	6
(Czechoslovakia) Jan Koželuh (United Kingdom) Madge Slaney	1	2
(United Kingdom) Colin Gregory (United Kingdom) Ermyntrude Harvey	7	3	6
(South Africa) Gerald Sherwell (United Kingdom) Enid Clarke	5	6	4
(France) René Lacoste (France) Yvonne Bourgeois	w/o
(United Kingdom) Cyril Eames (United Kingdom) Winifred Beamish
(Germany) Heinrich Kleinschroth (Republic of Ireland) Mrs RRW Jackson	1	1
(Australia) Jack Hawkes (Australia) Esna Boyd	6	6
(Republic of Ireland) Charles Scroope (United Kingdom) Dorothy Shepherd-Barron	6	6
(Denmark) Axel Petersen (Denmark) Inga Sperling	0	4
(United States) Bill Lingelbach (United Kingdom) Violet Chamberlain	1	5
(Italy) Uberto de Morpurgo (Italy) Lucia Valerio	6	7
(United Kingdom) Brian Gilbert (United Kingdom) Margaret Stocks	6	4	2
(Australia) Harry Hopman (Australia) Louie Bickerton	2	6	6
(Germany) Friedrich Rahe (Germany) Paula von Reznicek	4	2
(United Kingdom) Pat Hughes (United Kingdom) Eleanor Rose	6	6

Second round
3	(United States) F Hunter (United States) H Wills	6	10
(United Kingdom) C Gregory (United Kingdom) E Harvey	4	8
(United Kingdom) C Eames (United Kingdom) W Beamish	2	3
(Australia) J Hawkes (Australia) E Boyd	6	6
(Republic of Ireland) C Scroope (United Kingdom) D Shepherd-Barron	6	7
(Italy) H de Morpurgo (Italy) L Valerio	0	5
(Australia) H Hopman (Australia) L Bickerton	3	6	6
(United Kingdom) P Hughes (United Kingdom) E Rose	6	4	3

Third round
3	(United States) F Hunter (United States) H Wills	6	4	6
(Australia) J Hawkes (Australia) E Boyd	3	6	3
(Republic of Ireland) C Scroope (United Kingdom) D Shepherd-Barron	6	6
(Australia) H Hopman (Australia) L Bickerton	2	3

Quarterfinals
3	(United States) F Hunter (United States) H Wills	6	6
(Republic of Ireland) C Scroope (United Kingdom) D Shepherd-Barron	1	3

=== Bottom half ===
==== Section 3 ====
First round
1	(France) Henri Cochet (United Kingdom) Eileen Bennett	6	8
(France) Jacques Brugnon (United Kingdom) Gwen Sterry	1	6
(United Kingdom) Randolph Lycett (United Kingdom) Joan Lycett
(France) Antoine Gentien (France) Violette Gallay	w/o
Q	(United Kingdom) Dudley Pitt (United Kingdom) Peggy Pleydell-Bouverie	7	2	2
(Greece) Max Balli (Greece) Helene Nicolopoulos	5	6	6
(Republic of Ireland) Cecil Campbell (Republic of Ireland) Lavender Campbell	6	6
Q	(United Kingdom) Basil Lawrence (United Kingdom) Mrs Shepherd-Wellesley	1	3
(United Kingdom) Eric Peters (United Kingdom) JL Colegate	6	1	5
(Hungary) Béla von Kehrling (Germany) Cilly Aussem	2	6	7
(Australia) Jack Crawford (Australia) Daphne Akhurst
(Germany) Friedrich Frenz (Germany) Ellen Hoffman	w/o
(France) Édouard Borotra (United Kingdom) Mabel Mavrogordato	6	1	5
Q	(United States) Jack Olmsted (United Kingdom) Vera Marshall	3	6	7
(Argentina) Ronaldo Boyd (United Kingdom) CJ Tyrrell	6	4	5
(United Kingdom) Bunny Austin (United Kingdom) Betty Nuthall	3	6	7

Second round
1	(France) H Cochet (United Kingdom) E Bennett	9	6
(United Kingdom) R Lycett (United Kingdom) J Lycett	7	3
(Greece) M Balli (Greece) H Nicolopoulos	6	3
(Republic of Ireland) C Campbell (Republic of Ireland) L Campbell	8	6
(Hungary) B von Kehrling (Germany) C Aussem	5	2
(Australia) J Crawford (Australia) D Akhurst	7	6
Q	(United States) J Olmsted (United Kingdom) V Marshall	3	5
(United Kingdom) H Austin (United Kingdom) B Nuthall	6	7

Third round
1	(France) H Cochet (United Kingdom) E Bennett	6	6
(Republic of Ireland) C Campbell (Republic of Ireland) L Campbell	2	4
(Australia) J Crawford (Australia) D Akhurst	11	9
(United Kingdom) H Austin (United Kingdom) B Nuthall	9	7

Quarterfinals
1	(France) H Cochet (United Kingdom) E Bennett	10	4	3
(Australia) J Crawford (Australia) D Akhurst	8	6	6

==== Section 4 ====
First round
4	(United Kingdom) Gordon Crole-Rees (United Kingdom) Phoebe Watson	6	6
(United Kingdom) Lewis Michell (United Kingdom) Peggy Saunders	2	4
(United Kingdom) Donald Greig (United Kingdom) Elsie Goldsack	2	4
(United States) George Lott (United States) Molla Mallory	6	6
(United Kingdom) Teddy Higgs (United Kingdom) Mary McIlquham	9	6	6
(United Kingdom) Charles Kingsley (United Kingdom) Evelyn Colyer	11	3	3
Q	(United Kingdom) Alex Drew (United Kingdom) Barbara Drew	0	5
(France) Jean Borotra (France) Marguerite Bordes	6	7
(United States) Wilbur Coen (United States) Penelope Anderson	6	4	1
(United Kingdom) RC Wackett (United Kingdom) Joan Strawson	4	6	6
(Australia) Gar Moon (Australia) Meryl O'Hara Wood	6	6
(United Kingdom) Keats Lester (United Kingdom) Joan Ridley	0	4
(Netherlands) Hendrik Timmer (Netherlands) Kea Bouman	6	6
(United Kingdom) Patrick Wheatley (United Kingdom) Kathleen Bridge	2	4
(France) Roger Danet (France) Jacqueline Gallay	3	3
(Belgium) André Lacroix (Belgium) Josane Sigart	6	6

Second round
4	(United Kingdom) G Crole-Rees (United Kingdom) P Watson	6	3	6
(United States) G Lott (United States) M Mallory	4	6	3
(United Kingdom) E Higgs (United Kingdom) M McIlquham	2	4
(France) J Borotra (France) M Bordes	6	6
(United Kingdom) RC Wackett (United Kingdom) J Strawson	1	4
(Australia) E Moon (Australia) M O'Hara Wood	6	6
(Netherlands) H Timmer (Netherlands) K Bouman	6	3	8
(Belgium) A Lacroix (Belgium) J Sigart	0	6	6

Third round
4	(United Kingdom) G Crole-Rees (United Kingdom) P Watson	6	6
(France) J Borotra (France) M Bordes	4	3
(Australia) E Moon (Australia) M O'Hara Wood	7	3	6
(Netherlands) H Timmer (Netherlands) K Bouman	5	6	2

Quarterfinals
4	(United Kingdom) G Crole-Rees (United Kingdom) P Watson	4	4
(Australia) E Moon (Australia) M O'Hara Wood	6	6
