= 1928 Wimbledon Championships – Men's singles =

Men's singles
- 1928 Wimbledon Championships

Final
- Champion: (France) René Lacoste
- Runner-up: (France) Henri Cochet
- Score: 6–1, 4–6, 6–4, 6–2

Details
- Draw: 128 (10Q)
- Seeds: 8

Events
Singles	men	women		boys	girls
Doubles	men	women	mixed	boys	girls
- Wimbledon Championships

René Lacoste defeated the defending champion Henri Cochet 6–1, 4–6, 6–4, 6–2 in the final to win the gentlemen's singles tennis title at the 1928 Wimbledon Championships.

== Seeds ==
1. (France) Henri Cochet (final)
2. (France) René Lacoste (champion)
3. (United States) Bill Tilden (semifinals)
4. (United States) Frank Hunter (first round)
5. (France) Jean Borotra (quarterfinals)
6. (United States) John Hennessey (quarterfinals)
7. (Italy) Uberto de Morpurgo (quarterfinals)
8. (Australia) Gerald Patterson (fourth round)

Click on the seed number of a player to go to their draw section.

== Draw ==
Key

- Q = Qualifier
- WC = Wild card
- LL = Lucky loser
- Alt = Alternate
- ITF = ITF entry
- PR = Protected ranking
- SR = Special ranking
- SE = Special exempt
- JE = Junior exempt
- JR = Junior Accelerator Programme entrant
- CO = College Accelerator Programme entrant
- NG = Next Gen Accelerator Program entrant
- w/o = Walkover
- r = Retired
- d = Defaulted

=== Finals ===
Quarterfinals
1	(France) Henri Cochet	6	6	5	6
6	(United States) John Hennessey	4	1	7	3
(France) Christian Boussus	12	10	6
(France) Jacques Brugnon	10	8	2
2	(France) René Lacoste	6	6	6
7	(Italy) Uberto de Morpurgo	2	3	4
3	(United States) Bill Tilden	8	3	6	6
5	(France) Jean Borotra	6	6	3	2

Semifinals
1	(France) Henri Cochet	11	3	6	6
(France) Christian Boussus	9	6	2	3
2	(France) René Lacoste	2	6	2	6	6
3	(United States) Bill Tilden	6	4	6	4	3

Final
1	(France) Henri Cochet	1	6	4	2
2	(France) René Lacoste	6	4	6	6

=== Top half ===
==== Section 1 ====
First round
1	(France) Henri Cochet	6	8	6
(India) Mohammed Sleem	2	6	2
(United Kingdom) Teddy Higgs	2	4	5
(Australia) Harry Hopman	6	6	7
(Canada) Henry Mayes	6	6	6
(Australia) Jack Cummings	3	2	1
(United Kingdom) Frank Jarvis	5	1	9	6	1
(South Africa) GWV Hurst	7	6	7	1	6
(France) Édouard Borotra	7	4	6	8
(Belgium) André Lacroix	5	6	1	6
(France) André Aron	w/o
(Republic of Ireland) Charles Scroope
(Argentina) Ronaldo Boyd	6	6	6
(United Kingdom) Leslie Godfree	3	2	2
Q	(Argentina) Adriano Zappa	3	2	6	2
Q	(United Kingdom) Dudley Pitt	6	6	3	6

Second round
1	(France) H Cochet	6	6	8
(Australia) H Hopman	1	4	6
(Canada) H Mayes	6	6	6
(South Africa) GWV Hurst	1	2	2
(France) É Borotra	6	6	10	4
(Republic of Ireland) C Scroope	8	1	12	6
(Argentina) R Boyd	6	6	7
Q	(United Kingdom) D Pitt	3	3	5

Third round
1	(France) H Cochet	6	6	7	6
(Canada) H Mayes	1	8	5	2
(Republic of Ireland) C Scroope	3	6	0
(Argentina) R Boyd	6	8	6

Fourth round
1	(France) H Cochet	6	6	6
(Argentina) R Boyd	4	1	3

==== Section 2 ====
First round
6	(United States) John Hennessey	6	6	6
Q	(United States) Edward Mather	1	0	2
(United Kingdom) Norman Latchford	6	6	6
(United Kingdom) Theodore Mavrogordato	3	0	1
(South Africa) Gerald Sherwell	6	0	3	6	9
(United Kingdom) Brame Hillyard	3	6	6	1	7
(United Kingdom) Cyril Eames	6	7	6	6
(United Kingdom) CL Philcox	4	9	3	1
(United Kingdom) Gordon Crole-Rees	2	2	1
(United Kingdom) Eric Peters	6	6	6
(Germany) Friedrich Frenz
(Italy) Placido Gaslini	w/o
(New Zealand) John Peacock	4	6	6	2	3
(United Kingdom) Norman Dicks	6	3	1	6	6
(France) Roger Danet	6	6	0	3	6
(United Kingdom) Arthur Belgrave	3	1	6	6	3

Second round
6	(United States) J Hennessey	6	6	6
(United Kingdom) N Latchford	2	4	2
(South Africa) G Sherwell	3	6	6	5	7
(United Kingdom) C Eames	6	3	3	7	5
(United Kingdom) E Peters	2	6	6	10	5
(Germany) F Frenz	6	2	2	12	7
(United Kingdom) N Dicks	6	6	6
(France) R Danet	2	1	1

Third round
6	(United States) J Hennessey	6	7	6
(South Africa) G Sherwell	4	5	2
(Germany) F Frenz	6	8	6
(United Kingdom) N Dicks	3	6	3

Fourth round
6	(United States) J Hennessey	6	6	6
(Germany) F Frenz	4	1	3

==== Section 3 ====
First round
4	(United States) Frank Hunter	4	7	4	6	5
(New Zealand) Buster Andrews	6	5	6	2	7
(France) Christian Boussus	6	6	6
(United Kingdom) Herman David	1	3	2
(United Kingdom) Philip Glover	6	6	1	6
Q	(United Kingdom) ME Nigel-Jones	1	1	6	2
(Czechoslovakia) Roderich Menzel	w/o
(United States) Jack Olmsted
(United Kingdom) William Powell	4	6	5	8	2
(United Kingdom) Randolph Lycett	6	4	7	6	6
(Australia) Gar Moon	5	6	6	6
(United Kingdom) Brian Gilbert	7	1	0	4
(Japan) Yoshiro Ohta	6	1	6	6
(Italy) Giorgio de Stefani	3	6	1	3
(Greece) Augustos Zerlendis	6	8	6
Q	(France) Claude de Ricou	4	6	4

Second round
(New Zealand) E Andrews	4	1	1
(France) C Boussus	6	6	6
(United Kingdom) P Glover	7	1	5
(United States) J Olmsted	9	6	7
(United Kingdom) R Lycett	7	6	5	7	0
(Australia) E Moon	9	4	7	5	6
(Japan) Y Ohta	6	8	6
(Greece) A Zerlendis	1	6	3

Third round
(France) C Boussus	9	6	6
(United States) J Olmsted	7	1	2
(Australia) E Moon	6	6	7	6
(Japan) Y Ohta	4	2	9	4

Fourth round
(France) C Boussus	6	6	2	6
(Australia) E Moon	0	4	6	2

==== Section 4 ====
First round
8	(Australia) Gerald Patterson	6	4	6	7
(United Kingdom) Leighton Crawford	2	6	3	5
(Germany) Heinrich Kleinschroth	6	6	6
(United Kingdom) Billy Collins	4	2	1
(United Kingdom) John Olliff	6	1	1	6	7
(France) Emmanuel du Plaix	1	6	6	3	5
(United Kingdom) Charles Kingsley	6	1	6	6
(United Kingdom) Noel Turnbull	2	6	3	2
(Republic of Ireland) Denis O'Callaghan	6	6	6
Q	(United Kingdom) Richard Pickersgill	4	3	0
Q	(United Kingdom) Royden Dash	3	2	3
(Argentina) Guillermo Robson	6	6	6
(France) Jacques Brugnon	6	6	6
(United States) U Kramet	0	0	1
(South Africa) John Holthouse	7	6	6	6	6
(United Kingdom) JH Frowen	9	4	2	8	4

Second round
8	(Australia) G Patterson	6	6	6
(Germany) H Kleinschroth	0	2	1
(United Kingdom) J Olliff	4	1	12	2
(United Kingdom) C Kingsley	6	6	10	6
(Republic of Ireland) D O'Callaghan	7	6	1	6
(Argentina) G Robson	5	3	6	4
(France) J Brugnon	6	6	6
(South Africa) J Holthouse	2	4	2

Third round
8	(Australia) G Patterson	10	9	10	5	6
(United Kingdom) C Kingsley	8	11	8	7	2
(Republic of Ireland) D O'Callaghan	2	2	4
(France) J Brugnon	6	6	6

Fourth round
8	(Australia) G Patterson	3	7	4	2
(France) J Brugnon	6	5	6	6

=== Bottom half ===
==== Section 5 ====
First round
2	(France) René Lacoste	6	6	6
(South Africa) HL Walcott	0	2	2
(Australia) Jack Hawkes	6	6	6
(Austria) Hermann Artens	3	4	1
(United States) George Lott	6	6	6
(Republic of Ireland) F Crosbie	2	0	0
(Czechoslovakia) Jan Koželuh	w/o
(United Kingdom) Keats Lester
(United States) Wilbur Coen	7	6	6
(Denmark) Axel Petersen	5	3	3
(United Kingdom) Jack Hillyard	4	2	6	4
(India) EV Bobb	6	6	3	6
(United Kingdom) Bunny Austin	6	6	6
(India) Sydney Jacob	1	3	1
Q	(United Kingdom) Victor Cazalet	5	6	2
(United Kingdom) Patrick Wheatley	7	8	6

Second round
2	(France) R Lacoste	6	4	6	6
(Australia) J Hawkes	3	6	3	4
(United States) G Lott	6	7	7
(United Kingdom) K Lester	1	5	5
(United States) W Coen	6	6	6
(India) EV Bobb	3	3	3
(United Kingdom) H Austin	6	6	6	6	6
(United Kingdom) P Wheatley	2	8	8	2	1

Third round
2	(France) R Lacoste	6	9	6	6
(United States) G Lott	1	7	8	2
(United States) W Coen	4	6	4	6	1
(United Kingdom) H Austin	6	3	6	3	6

Fourth round
2	(France) R Lacoste	6	6	6	1	6
(United Kingdom) H Austin	4	4	8	6	2

==== Section 6 ====
First round
7	(Italy) Uberto de Morpurgo	6	9	6
(United States) Bill Breese	2	7	1
(United Kingdom) David Williams	6	6	7
(Malaysia) DH Kleinman	1	4	5
(United Kingdom) Ted Avory	4	6	6	6
(United Kingdom) RC Wackett	6	4	1	4
(Austria) Franz Matejka	6	8	8	6
(Germany) Friedrich Rahe	3	10	6	3
(Argentina) Hector Cattaruzza	6	7	6
(United Kingdom) Roger Worthington	1	5	2
(United Kingdom) Brian Helmore	2	3	3
(United Kingdom) Harry Lee	6	6	6
(United Kingdom) Ian Collins	6	6	6
(Greece) Max Balli	3	3	3
(Republic of Ireland) St John Mahony	7	2	5	7
(France) René de Buzelet	5	6	7	9

Second round
7	(Italy) H de Morpurgo	6	6	6
(United Kingdom) D Williams	2	4	2
(United Kingdom) E Avory	6	6	0	3	0
(Austria) F-W Matejka	3	3	6	6	6
(Argentina) H Cattaruzza	6	2	3	2
(United Kingdom) H Lee	1	6	6	6
(United Kingdom) I Collins	6	8	4	2
(France) R de Buzelet	3	10	6	6

Third round
7	(Italy) H de Morpurgo	6	9	3	7
(Austria) F-W Matejka	2	7	6	5
(United Kingdom) H Lee	6	3	4	11
(France) R de Buzelet	2	6	6	13

Fourth round
7	(Italy) H de Morpurgo	6	6	6
(France) R de Buzelet	4	2	2

==== Section 7 ====
First round
3	(United States) Bill Tilden	6	6	6
(United Kingdom) Maurice Summerson	0	1	0
(Switzerland) Hector Fisher	6	6	6
Q	(United Kingdom) Oswald Jameson	3	2	4
(United Kingdom) Basil Lawrence
(United Kingdom) Harry Lewis-Barclay	w/o
(Hungary) Béla von Kehrling	6	7	6	6
(India) Hira-Lal Soni	2	9	2	2
(Italy) Roberto Bocciardo	4	6	4	6	5
(Republic of Ireland) Cecil Campbell	6	4	6	3	7
(France) Pierre Henri Landry	6	6	6	4	3
(United Kingdom) Donald Greig	3	8	4	6	2^{r}
Q	(United States) Sidney Wood	10	6	12
(United Kingdom) Nigel Sharpe	8	1	10
(United States) Henry Brunie	3	3	6	6	6
(France) Antoine Gentien	6	6	3	3	4

Second round
3	(United States) W Tilden	6	6	6
(Switzerland) H Fisher	1	3	1
(United Kingdom) B Lawrence	0	2	3
(Hungary) B von Kehrling	6	6	6
(Republic of Ireland) C Campbell	2	6	4	3
(France) PH Landry	6	4	6	6
Q	(United States) S Wood	1	4	6	6	6
(United States) H Brunie	6	6	3	4	2

Third round
3	(United States) W Tilden	6	6	6
(Hungary) B von Kehrling	2	3	1
(France) PH Landry	4	6	6	8
Q	(United States) S Wood	6	1	1	6

Fourth round
3	(United States) W Tilden	6	2	2	6	6
(France) PH Landry	4	6	6	1	4

==== Section 8 ====
First round
5	(France) Jean Borotra	6	8	6
(United Kingdom) Arthur Lowe	2	6	4
(New Zealand) Russell Young	1	4	4
(United Kingdom) Pat Hughes	6	6	6
(Netherlands) Hendrik Timmer	8	6	6
(Republic of Ireland) George Lyttleton-Rogers	6	4	3
(South Africa) Pat Spence	6	10	2	6
(United Kingdom) Harvey Mackintosh	1	8	6	3
(United Kingdom) John Pennycuick	8	6	6
(South Africa) Norman Farquharson	6	3	3
(Australia) Jack Crawford	6	6	6
(United Kingdom) Douglas Hodges	1	3	2
(United Kingdom) Colin Gregory	6	5	6	6
(Germany) Feo Hartz	2	7	3	4
(United States) Bill Lingelbach	6	3	8	6	4
(Argentina) Carlos Morea	4	6	10	4	6

Second round
5	(France) J Borotra	1	6	6	8
(United Kingdom) P Hughes	6	4	3	6
(Netherlands) H Timmer	1	6	4	10	3
(South Africa) P Spence	6	4	6	8	6
(United Kingdom) J Pennycuick	4	6	3	10
(Australia) J Crawford	6	2	6	12
(United Kingdom) C Gregory	6	3	8	4	6
(Argentina) C Morea	3	6	6	6	1

Third round
5	(France) J Borotra	7	7	6
(South Africa) P Spence	5	5	3
(Australia) J Crawford	9	6	6
(United Kingdom) C Gregory	7	4	3

Fourth round
5	(France) J Borotra	3	6	6	7	6
(Australia) J Crawford	6	4	2	9	3

Preceded by 1928 French Championships	Grand Slams; Men's Singles	Succeeded by 1928 U.S. Championships
