= 1927 Wimbledon Championships – Men's singles =

Men's singles
- 1927 Wimbledon Championships

Final
- Champion: (France) Henri Cochet
- Runner-up: (France) Jean Borotra
- Score: 4–6, 4–6, 6–3, 6–4, 7–5

Details
- Draw: 128 (10Q)
- Seeds: 8

Events
Singles	men	women		boys	girls
Doubles	men	women	mixed	boys	girls
- Wimbledon Championships

Henri Cochet defeated the defending champion Jean Borotra in the final, 4–6, 4–6, 6–3, 6–4, 7–5 to win the gentlemen's singles tennis title at the 1927 Wimbledon Championships. He saved a record six championship points, and became the first player to win three consecutive Grand Slam matches from two sets down, an achievement that went unmatched until Tommy Robredo did so at the 2013 French Open.

Sidney Wood became the youngest competitor in the men's singles at Wimbledon at 15 years 231 days; he was defeated by René Lacoste in the first round. Meanwhile, George Greville became the oldest singles player in Wimbledon history, aged 59 when he was defeated in the first round.

== Seeds ==
1. (France) René Lacoste (semifinals)
2. (United States) Bill Tilden (semifinals)
3. (France) Jean Borotra (final)
4. (France) Henri Cochet (champion)
5. (Japan) Takeichi Harada (first round)
6. (South Africa) Louis Raymond (second round)
7. (France) Jacques Brugnon (quarterfinals)
8. (Czechoslovakia) Jan Koželuh (quarterfinals)

Click on the seed number of a player to go to their draw section.

== Draw ==
Key

- Q = Qualifier
- WC = Wild card
- LL = Lucky loser
- Alt = Alternate
- ITF = ITF entry
- PR = Protected ranking
- SR = Special ranking
- SE = Special exempt
- JE = Junior exempt
- JR = Junior Accelerator Programme entrant
- CO = College Accelerator Programme entrant
- NG = Next Gen Accelerator Program entrant
- w/o = Walkover
- r = Retired
- d = Defaulted

=== Finals ===
Quarterfinals
2	(United States) Bill Tilden	6	6	3	7
7	(France) Jacques Brugnon	3	1	6	5
4	(France) Henri Cochet	3	3	6	6	6
(United States) Frank Hunter	6	6	2	2	3
1	(France) René Lacoste	6	6	6
8	(Czechoslovakia) Jan Koželuh	4	3	4
3	(France) Jean Borotra	6	3	6	6
(Netherlands) Hendrik Timmer	1	6	3	0

Semifinals
2	(United States) Bill Tilden	6	6	5	4	3
4	(France) Henri Cochet	2	4	7	6	6
1	(France) René Lacoste	4	3	6	6	2
3	(France) Jean Borotra	6	6	1	1	6

Final
4	(France) Henri Cochet	4	4	6	6	7
3	(France) Jean Borotra	6	6	3	4	5

=== Top half ===
==== Section 1 ====
First round
2	(United States) Bill Tilden	6	6	6
Q	(United Kingdom) GA Pratt	2	1	0
(United Kingdom) Roy Poland	1	6	6	6
(United Kingdom) RC Wackett	6	3	4	3
(United Kingdom) Roger Worthington	6	6	7
Q	(United Kingdom) Eliot Crawshay-Williams	1	3	5
(Romania) Nicolae Mișu	3	6	0	6	5
(United Kingdom) Pat Hughes	6	2	6	3	7
(United Kingdom) George Cholmondeley	6	6	6	6	8
(United Kingdom) Edward Dearman	8	8	3	1	6
(United Kingdom) Theodore Mavrogordato	2	7	6	5
(Republic of Ireland) Edward McGuire	6	9	1	7
(Switzerland) Hector Fisher	6	4	6	11
(France) Claude de Ricou	3	6	1	9
(France) Christian Boussus	9	7	6
(United Kingdom) Jack Hillyard	7	5	4

Second round
2	(United States) W Tilden	6	6	6
(United Kingdom) R Poland	3	0	1
(United Kingdom) R Worthington	2	6	2
(United Kingdom) P Hughes	6	8	6
(United Kingdom) G Cholmondeley	12	1	3
(Republic of Ireland) E McGuire	14	6	6
(Switzerland) H Fisher	6	9	3	4	2
(France) C Boussus	2	7	6	6	6

Third round
2	(United States) W Tilden	6	6	6
(United Kingdom) P Hughes	3	4	0
(Republic of Ireland) E McGuire	2	7	0	1
(France) C Boussus	6	5	6	6

Fourth round
2	(United States) W Tilden	6	7	6
(France) C Boussus	1	5	2

==== Section 2 ====
First round
7	(France) Jacques Brugnon	8	6	6
(New Zealand) Francis Fisher	6	4	4
(United Kingdom) Tony Buzzard	4	3	6	4
(United Kingdom) Henry Hunter	6	6	4	6
(United Kingdom) Eric Peters	6	6	6
(United Kingdom) George Stoddart	2	2	2
(Germany) Otto Froitzheim	11	6	3	6
(United Kingdom) Ian Collins	9	3	6	3
(Republic of Ireland) AE Browne	6	9	6
Q	(United Kingdom) EC Penny	2	7	2
(Republic of Ireland) Noel Holmes
(South Africa) Pat Spence	w/o
(India) Krishna Prasada	7	6	6
(United Kingdom) Arthur Yencken	5	4	1
(United Kingdom) Charles Kingsley	6	6	6
(United Kingdom) Will Legg	2	0	2

Second round
7	(France) J Brugnon	7	6	6
(United Kingdom) H Hunter	5	1	3
(United Kingdom) E Peters	0	3	10
(Germany) O Froitzheim	6	6	12
(Republic of Ireland) AE Browne	6	10	3	4	6
(Republic of Ireland) N Holmes	4	8	6	6	2
(India) K Prasada	1	1	2
(United Kingdom) C Kingsley	6	6	6

Third round
7	(France) J Brugnon	6	6	4	6
(Germany) O Froitzheim	1	2	6	3
(Republic of Ireland) AE Browne	3	6	5	2
(United Kingdom) C Kingsley	6	4	7	6

Fourth round
7	(France) J Brugnon	4	6	6	6
(United Kingdom) C Kingsley	6	3	2	2

==== Section 3 ====
First round
4	(France) Henri Cochet	6	6	6
(United Kingdom) Fassett Burnett	4	3	4
(United Kingdom) Noel Turnbull	6	7	6
Q	(United Kingdom) Cyril Banks	2	5	1
(United Kingdom) Llewellyn Owen
(Netherlands) Cornelis Bryan	w/o
(Republic of Ireland) Harold Price	3	3	4
(Germany) Heinrich Kleinschroth	6	6	6
(United Kingdom) RD England	2	7	7	6
(Republic of Ireland) Jack Miley	6	5	5	3
(United Kingdom) Norman Latchford
(Czechoslovakia) Ernst Gottlieb	w/o
Q	(United Kingdom) Hew Stoker	8	3	9	6	1
(United Kingdom) William Powell	6	6	11	2	6
(Hungary) Béla von Kehrling	6	6	3	7
(United Kingdom) John Pennycuick	1	3	6	5

Second round
4	(France) H Cochet	6	0	6	6
(United Kingdom) N Turnbull	2	6	2	3
(United Kingdom) L Owen	4	6	1	3
(Germany) H Kleinschroth	6	2	6	6
(United Kingdom) RD England	4	1	8	6	6
(United Kingdom) N Latchford	6	6	6	4	3
(United Kingdom) W Powell	6	0	8	4
(Hungary) B von Kehrling	4	6	10	6

Third round
4	(France) H Cochet	7	9	6
(Germany) H Kleinschroth	5	7	0
(United Kingdom) RD England	1	1	2
(Hungary) B von Kehrling	6	6	6

Fourth round
4	(France) H Cochet	8	6	6
(Hungary) B von Kehrling	6	3	2

==== Section 4 ====
First round
6	(South Africa) Louis Raymond	6	7	8
(United Kingdom) Claude Roupell	4	5	6
(United Kingdom) DM Evans	1	5	6	3
(United Kingdom) Gordon Crole-Rees	6	7	2	6
(United Kingdom) JE Pogson-Smith	6	9	1	6	6
(United Kingdom) Leighton Crawford	2	11	6	3	8
(United Kingdom) Colin Gregory	10	6	6
(United Kingdom) Maurice Summerson	8	0	3
(United Kingdom) Arthur Lowe	6	6	6
(United Kingdom) Randolph Lycett	2	4	4
(United Kingdom) Ted Avory	3	6	6	0
(United Kingdom) Brame Hillyard	6	8	3	6
(Japan) Yoshiro Ohta	1	4	3
(United States) Frank Hunter	6	6	6
(United Kingdom) Henry Standring	8	3	0
(United Kingdom) Algernon Kingscote	10	6	6

Second round
6	(South Africa) L Raymond	6	3	6	5	2
(United Kingdom) G Crole-Rees	2	6	4	7	6
(United Kingdom) FRL Crawford	3	1	3
(United Kingdom) C Gregory	6	6	6
(United Kingdom) A Lowe	6	6	6
(United Kingdom) B Hillyard	4	4	0
(United States) F Hunter	6	6	6
(United Kingdom) A Kingscote	3	3	4

Third round
(United Kingdom) G Crole-Rees	3	3	1
(United Kingdom) C Gregory	6	6	6
(United Kingdom) A Lowe	2	6	3
(United States) F Hunter	6	8	6

Fourth round
(United Kingdom) C Gregory	6	5	2	6	3
(United States) F Hunter	4	7	6	4	6

=== Bottom half ===
==== Section 5 ====
First round
1	(France) René Lacoste	6	6	6
(United States) Sidney Wood	1	3	1
(United Kingdom) Brian Helmore	1	3	1
(India) Sydney Jacob	6	6	6
(United Kingdom) Harvey Mackintosh	6	6	5	7
(United Kingdom) George Greville	4	3	7	5
(United Kingdom) CJ Brierley	w/o
(France) Roger Danet
Q	(United Kingdom) Oswald Jameson	2	0	4
(South Africa) Jack Condon	6	6	6
(France) Antoine Gentien	7	6	6	5	6
(United Kingdom) Douglas Powell	9	2	1	7	2
(India) Athar-Ali Fyzee	w/o
Q	(Republic of Ireland) Chester Walsh
(Canada) Henry Mayes	6	6	6
(United Kingdom) Arthur Berger	1	3	2

Second round
1	(France) R Lacoste	2	6	6	6
(India) S Jacob	6	0	3	4
(United Kingdom) H Mackintosh	6	4	6	6
(France) R Danet	4	6	3	4
(South Africa) J Condon	2	6	1	0
(France) A Gentien	6	4	6	6
Q	(Republic of Ireland) C Walsh	2	6	1	0
(Canada) H Mayes	6	4	6	6

Third round
1	(France) R Lacoste	6	6	6
(United Kingdom) H Mackintosh	0	2	2
(South Africa) J Condon	9	4	6	4	6
(Canada) H Mayes	7	6	2	6	0

Fourth round
1	(France) R Lacoste	6	6	6
(South Africa) J Condon	0	3	3

==== Section 6 ====
First round
8	(Czechoslovakia) Jan Koželuh	5	6	6	6
(United Kingdom) Royden Dash	7	4	1	2
(United Kingdom) Harvey Hillier
(Egypt) Loutfalla Wahid	w/o
(Republic of Ireland) St John Mahony	7	6	9
(United Kingdom) Lionel Alderson	5	4	7
(Sweden) Henning Müller	3	4	6	3
(United Kingdom) Craig Campbell	6	6	4	6
(United Kingdom) Donald Greig	6	6	7
(United Kingdom) Douglas Hodges	4	1	5
(United Kingdom) Nigel Sharpe	6	6	6
(United Kingdom) Cecil Tindell-Green	2	1	1
(Germany) Oscar Kreuzer	6	6	6
(United Kingdom) Neville Deed	2	2	3
(United Kingdom) Leslie Godfree	4	4	7	3
(United Kingdom) Keats Lester	6	6	5	6

Second round
8	(Czechoslovakia) J Koželuh	6	6	6
(United Kingdom) H Hillier	1	4	4
(Republic of Ireland) StJ Mahony	10	7	6
(United Kingdom) C Campbell	8	5	1
(United Kingdom) D Greig	6	1	4	6	6
(United Kingdom) N Sharpe	4	6	6	3	4
(Germany) O Kreuzer	1	0	3
(United Kingdom) K Lester	6	6	6

Third round
8	(Czechoslovakia) J Koželuh	6	6	6
(Republic of Ireland) StJ Mahony	2	4	4
(United Kingdom) D Greig	3	3	6	6	6
(United Kingdom) K Lester	6	6	4	4	4

Fourth round
8	(Czechoslovakia) J Koželuh	6	3
(United Kingdom) D Greig	4	0^{r}

==== Section 7 ====
First round
3	(France) Jean Borotra	7	7	9
(United Kingdom) Arthur Belgrave	5	5	7
(Dutch East Indies) EL Sarkies	2	1	3
(United Kingdom) William Radcliffe	6	6	6
(United Kingdom) Billy Collins
(United Kingdom) Brian Gilbert	w/o
(United Kingdom) Teddy Higgs	2	3	6	7	8
(Austria) Hermann Artens	6	6	2	5	6
(South Africa) Norman Farquharson	5	0	6	6	6
(United Kingdom) Clinton McIlquham	7	6	3	3	4
(India) Hassan Ali Fyzee	w/o
(United Kingdom) Ambrose Dudley
(United Kingdom) David Williams	9	6	6
Q	(United Kingdom) PRR Hurditch	7	4	4
(Republic of Ireland) Cecil Campbell	6	6	6
(United Kingdom) WB Stott	1	1	0

Second round
3	(France) J Borotra	7	3	6	6
(United Kingdom) W Radcliffe	5	6	4	4
(United Kingdom) W Collins	3	0	6	4
(United Kingdom) E Higgs	6	6	4	6
(South Africa) N Farquharson	10	4	5	6	6
(United Kingdom) A Dudley	8	6	7	4	3
(United Kingdom) D Williams	1	1	0
(Republic of Ireland) C Campbell	6	6	6

Third round
3	(France) J Borotra	6	2	1	6	6
(United Kingdom) E Higgs	1	6	6	2	2
(South Africa) N Farquharson	1	4	1
(Republic of Ireland) C Campbell	6	6	6

Fourth round
3	(France) J Borotra	6	8	6	6
(Republic of Ireland) C Campbell	8	6	0	1

==== Section 8 ====
First round
5	(Japan) Takeichi Harada	6	4	1	6	2
(France) Pierre Henri Landry	4	6	6	1	6
(United Kingdom) Norman Dicks	6	8	4	6
(Republic of Ireland) F Crosbie	3	6	6	1
(Netherlands) Hendrik Timmer	6	8	8
(United States) Watson Washburn	1	6	6
Q	(United Kingdom) JDF Fisher	1	3	0
(United Kingdom) Walter Crawley	6	6	6
(United Kingdom) RDN Pryce-Jones	2	6	4
(United Kingdom) Frank Jarvis	6	8	6
(United Kingdom) CL Philcox	2	6	6	6
(United Kingdom) WHM Aitken	6	3	3	4
(United Kingdom) Monty Temple	3	4	4
Q	(United Kingdom) Harry Lee	6	6	6
(South Africa) Gerald Sherwell	1	6	1	3
(United Kingdom) Cyril Eames	6	4	6	6

Second round
(France) PH Landry	6	2	6	6
(United Kingdom) N Dicks	1	6	1	2
(Netherlands) H Timmer	6	6	6
(United Kingdom) W Crawley	4	4	2
(United Kingdom) F Jarvis	3	3	3
(United Kingdom) CL Philcox	6	6	6
Q	(United Kingdom) H Lee	3	6	7	6
(United Kingdom) C Eames	6	4	5	2

Third round
(France) PH Landry	5	4	6	6
(Netherlands) H Timmer	7	6	3	8
(United Kingdom) CL Philcox	7	5	6	6	6
Q	(United Kingdom) H Lee	9	7	1	2	4

Fourth round
(Netherlands) H Timmer	6	6	6
(United Kingdom) CL Philcox	3	2	0

Preceded by 1927 French Championships	Grand Slams; Men's Singles	Succeeded by 1927 U.S. Championships
