= 1927 Wimbledon Championships – Men's doubles =

Men's doubles
- 1927 Wimbledon Championships

Final
- Champions: (United States) Frank Hunter (United States) Bill Tilden
- Runners-up: (France) Jacques Brugnon (France) Henri Cochet
- Score: 1–6, 4–6, 8–6, 6–3, 6–4

Details
- Draw: 64 (4 Q )
- Seeds: 4

Events
Singles	men	women		boys	girls
Doubles	men	women	mixed	boys	girls
← 1926 ·	Wimbledon Championships	· 1928 →

Frank Hunter and Bill Tilden defeated defending champions Jacques Brugnon and Henri Cochet in the final, 1–6, 4–6, 8–6, 6–3, 6–4 to win the gentlemen's doubles tennis title at the 1927 Wimbledon Championship.

== Seeds ==
1. (France) Jacques Brugnon / (France) Henri Cochet (final)
2. (France) Jean Borotra / (France) René Lacoste (third round)
3. (United States) Frank Hunter / (United States) Bill Tilden (champions)
4. (South Africa) Jack Condon / (South Africa) Louis Raymond (semifinals)

Click on the seed number of a player to go to their draw section.

== Draw ==
=== Key ===
- Q = Qualifier
- WC = Wild card
- LL = Lucky loser
- Alt = Alternate
- ITF = ITF entry
- PR = Protected ranking
- SR = Special ranking
- SE = Special exempt
- JE = Junior exempt
- JR = Junior Accelerator Programme entrant
- CO = College Accelerator Programme entrant
- NG = Next Gen Accelerator Program entrant
- w/o = Walkover
- r = Retired
- d = Defaulted

=== Finals ===
Quarterfinals
(United Kingdom) Gordon Crole-Rees (United Kingdom) Cyril Eames	2	3	4
(United Kingdom) Bunny Austin (United Kingdom) Randolph Lycett	6	6	6
3	(United States) Frank Hunter (United States) Bill Tilden	7	6	6
(United Kingdom) Norman Latchford (United Kingdom) RDN Pryce-Jones	5	3	3
1	(France) Jacques Brugnon (France) Henri Cochet	8	6	3	6
(United Kingdom) Colin Gregory (United Kingdom) Charles Kingsley	6	3	6	4
4	(South Africa) Jack Condon (South Africa) Louis Raymond	6	6	6
(United Kingdom) Teddy Higgs (United Kingdom) Keats Lester	3	4	4

Semifinals
(United Kingdom) Bunny Austin (United Kingdom) Randolph Lycett	0	8	4
3	(United States) Frank Hunter (United States) Bill Tilden	6	10	6
1	(France) Jacques Brugnon (France) Henri Cochet	6	6	7
4	(South Africa) Jack Condon (South Africa) Louis Raymond	1	2	5

Final
3	(United States) Frank Hunter (United States) Bill Tilden	1	4	8	6	6
1	(France) Jacques Brugnon (France) Henri Cochet	6	6	6	3	4

=== Top half ===
==== Section 1 ====
First round
2	(France) Jean Borotra (France) René Lacoste	6	6	6
(United Kingdom) Pat Hughes (United Kingdom) Henry Standring	3	4	2
(Austria) Hermann Artens (United States) AW Asthalter
(United Kingdom) M Davies; HG Hellier	w/o
(United Kingdom) Leonard Lyle (United Kingdom) Albert Prebble	2	1	6
(United Kingdom) Gordon Crole-Rees (United Kingdom) Cyril Eames	6	6	8
(United Kingdom) Edward Dearman (United Kingdom) Brian Helmore	6	3	4	6	2
(United Kingdom) Arthur Berger (United Kingdom) HF Hunt	3	6	6	4	6
(United Kingdom) Henry Hunter (United Kingdom) Richard Saul	5	3	1
(Germany) Otto Froitzheim (Germany) Oscar Kreuzer	7	6	6
(Netherlands) Cornelis Bryan (Netherlands) Hendrik Timmer	7	8	6
(Republic of Ireland) Harold Price (Republic of Ireland) Harry Read	5	6	3
(United Kingdom) DM Evans (United Kingdom) RG Stone	2	2	3
(France) Roger Danet (France) Antoine Gentien	6	6	6
(United Kingdom) Bunny Austin (United Kingdom) Randolph Lycett	6	6	4	7
(United Kingdom) Jack Hillyard (United Kingdom) FR Scovel	3	1	6	5

Second round
2	(France) J Borotra (France) R Lacoste	7	6	6
(Austria) H Artens (United States) AW Asthalter	5	3	1
(United Kingdom) G Crole-Rees (United Kingdom) C Eames	9	6	6	9
(United Kingdom) A Berger (United Kingdom) HF Hunt	11	2	4	7
(Germany) O Froitzheim (Germany) O Kreuzer	6	2	6	5	2
(Netherlands) C Bryan (Netherlands) H Timmer	4	6	3	7	6
(France) R Danet (France) A Gentien	5	6	3	1
(United Kingdom) H Austin (United Kingdom) R Lycett	7	3	6	6

Third round
2	(France) J Borotra (France) R Lacoste	4	6	2	6	4
(United Kingdom) G Crole-Rees (United Kingdom) C Eames	6	4	6	4	6
(Netherlands) C Bryan (Netherlands) H Timmer	2	4	6
(United Kingdom) H Austin (United Kingdom) R Lycett	6	6	8

Quarterfinals
(United Kingdom) G Crole-Rees (United Kingdom) C Eames	2	3	4
(United Kingdom) H Austin (United Kingdom) R Lycett	6	6	6

The nationality of HG Hellier is unknown.

==== Section 2 ====
First round
3	(United States) Frank Hunter (United States) Bill Tilden	6	6	6
(Republic of Ireland) Cecil Campbell (United Kingdom) Eliot Crawshay-Williams	0	3	1
(United Kingdom) Leslie Godfree (United Kingdom) Donald Greig	6	6	6
(United Kingdom) WHM Aitken (Republic of Ireland) Noel Holmes	3	3	1
Q	(United Kingdom) WT Tucker (United Kingdom) David Williams	1	3	4
(United Kingdom) HE Forman (United Kingdom) WHA Hunt	6	6	6
Q	(United Kingdom) Eric Hollins (United Kingdom) Martin Wedd	4	8	6	3
(Canada) Henry Mayes (United Kingdom) Maurice Summerson	6	10	4	6
(India) Hassan Ali Fyzee (India) Krishna Prasada	6	10	6
(Republic of Ireland) Edward McGuire (Republic of Ireland) Jack Miley	2	8	2
(South Africa) Norman Farquharson (South Africa) Pat Spence	w/o
(United Kingdom) Fassett Burnett (United Kingdom) Vincent Burr
(United Kingdom) George Birtles (United Kingdom) JG Hogan
(United Kingdom) Brian Gilbert (United Kingdom) Noel Turnbull	w/o
(United Kingdom) William Powell (New Zealand) Russell Young	1	5	1
(United Kingdom) Norman Latchford (United Kingdom) RDN Pryce-Jones	6	7	6

Second round
3	(United States) F Hunter (United States) W Tilden	6	10	0
(United Kingdom) L Godfree (United Kingdom) D Greig	0	8	0^{r}
(United Kingdom) HE Forman (United Kingdom) WHA Hunt	1	0	7	4
(Canada) H Mayes (United Kingdom) M Summerson	6	6	5	6
(India) HA Fyzee (India) K Prasada	12	6	5	7
(United Kingdom) F Burnett (United Kingdom) V Burr	10	3	7	5
(United Kingdom) G Birtles (United Kingdom) JG Hogan	6	4	1	3
(United Kingdom) N Latchford (United Kingdom) RDN Pryce-Jones	4	6	6	6

Third round
3	(United States) F Hunter (United States) W Tilden	7	6	6
(Canada) H Mayes (United Kingdom) M Summerson	5	2	3
(India) HA Fyzee (India) K Prasada	3	6	6	5	2
(United Kingdom) N Latchford (United Kingdom) RDN Pryce-Jones	6	4	1	7	6

Quarterfinals
3	(United States) F Hunter (United States) W Tilden	7	6	6
(United Kingdom) N Latchford (United Kingdom) RDN Pryce-Jones	5	3	3

=== Bottom half ===
==== Section 3 ====
First round
1	(France) Jacques Brugnon (France) Henri Cochet	10	6	6
(United Kingdom) Ambrose Dudley (Romania) Nicolae Mișu	8	3	4
(United Kingdom) Theodore Mavrogordato (South Africa) Gerald Sherwell	7	7	6
(United Kingdom) Claude Metcalf (United Kingdom) Arthur Vinall	5	5	4
(France) Christian Boussus (France) Pierre Henri Landry	6	6	4	6
Q	(United Kingdom) Graham Mathieson (United Kingdom) JB Pittman	3	2	6	2
(Czechoslovakia) Ernst Gottlieb (Czechoslovakia) Jan Koželuh	7	6	6
(United Kingdom) Frank Jarvis (United States) Sidney Wood	5	1	1
NB Deane (United Kingdom) RD England	6	6	5	11
(United Kingdom) Walter Crawley (United Kingdom) Monty Temple	2	2	7	9
(United Kingdom) Colin Gregory (United Kingdom) Charles Kingsley	6	6	6
(United Kingdom) Algernon Kingscote (United Kingdom) Arthur Yencken	4	2	4
(United Kingdom) Ian Collins (United Kingdom) Billy Collins	6	6	6
(United Kingdom) Leighton Crawford (United Kingdom) Eric Peters	4	3	4
(United Kingdom) Royden Dash (United Kingdom) Roy Poland	6	6	2	3	6
(United Kingdom) Douglas Powell (United Kingdom) Nigel Sharpe	3	4	6	6	3

Second round
1	(France) J Brugnon (France) H Cochet	6	6	5	6
(United Kingdom) T Mavrogordato (South Africa) G Sherwell	2	4	7	3
(France) C Boussus (France) PH Landry	2	7	4
(Czechoslovakia) E Gottlieb (Czechoslovakia) J Koželuh	6	9	6
NB Deane (United Kingdom) RD England	1	1	1
(United Kingdom) C Gregory (United Kingdom) C Kingsley	6	6	6
(United Kingdom) I Collins (United Kingdom) W Collins	6	6	6
(United Kingdom) R Dash (United Kingdom) R Poland	1	2	4

Third round
1	(France) J Brugnon (France) H Cochet	6	6	6
(Czechoslovakia) E Gottlieb (Czechoslovakia) J Koželuh	2	2	3
(United Kingdom) C Gregory (United Kingdom) C Kingsley	6	6	11
(United Kingdom) I Collins (United Kingdom) W Collins	3	2	9

Quarterfinals
1	(France) J Brugnon (France) H Cochet	8	6	3	6
(United Kingdom) C Gregory (United Kingdom) C Kingsley	6	3	6	4

The nationality of NB Deane is unknown.

==== Section 4 ====
First round
4	(South Africa) Jack Condon (South Africa) Louis Raymond	4	6	6	6
(United Kingdom) Tony Buzzard (United Kingdom) Roger Worthington	6	4	1	3
(Republic of Ireland) AE Browne (United Kingdom) Douglas Hodges	6	4	8	7
(United States) Bill Lingelbach (France) Claude de Ricou	2	6	10	9
(United Kingdom) Herbert Roper Barrett (United Kingdom) Arthur Gore	6	4	4	10
Q	(United Kingdom) Francis Stowe (United Kingdom) Ulysses Williams	3	6	6	12
(United Kingdom) Alfred Ingram (United Kingdom) William Radcliffe	6	5	8	3
(United Kingdom) Turner Cole (United Kingdom) RC Wackett	1	7	10	6
(United Kingdom) JT Baines (South Africa) Julien Lezard	4	5	2
(Hungary) Béla von Kehrling (Germany) Heinrich Kleinschroth	6	7	6
(United Kingdom) Lewis Michell (United Kingdom) JE Pogson-Smith	6	1	1	3
(United Kingdom) Teddy Higgs (United Kingdom) Keats Lester	2	6	6	6
(United Kingdom) Harvey Mackintosh (United Kingdom) WB Stott	4	2	9	1
(Republic of Ireland) Cecil Campbell (Republic of Ireland) St John Mahony	6	6	7	6
(New Zealand) Frank Fisher (New Zealand) Frank Wilding	1	6	2
(Japan) Takeichi Harada (United States) Watson Washburn	6	8	6

Second round
4	(South Africa) J Condon (South Africa) L Raymond
(United States) W Lingelbach (France) C de Ricou	w/o
Q	(United Kingdom) F Stowe (United Kingdom) U Williams	6	7	5	2
(United Kingdom) T Cole (United Kingdom) RC Wackett	4	9	7	6
(Hungary) B von Kehrling (Germany) H Kleinschroth	6	7	4	2	3
(United Kingdom) E Higgs (United Kingdom) K Lester	4	5	6	6	6
(Republic of Ireland) C Campbell (Republic of Ireland) StJ Mahony	0	4	6	2
(Japan) T Harada (United States) W Washburn	6	6	2	6

Third round
4	(South Africa) J Condon (South Africa) L Raymond	4	4	8	6	6
(United Kingdom) T Cole (United Kingdom) RC Wackett	6	6	6	4	3
(United Kingdom) E Higgs (United Kingdom) K Lester	2	3	6	6	6
(Japan) T Harada (United States) W Washburn	6	6	2	4	3

Quarterfinals
4	(South Africa) J Condon (South Africa) L Raymond	6	6	6
(United Kingdom) E Higgs (United Kingdom) K Lester	3	4	4
