= 1932 Wimbledon Championships – Men's doubles =

Men's doubles
- 1932 Wimbledon Championships

Final
- Champions: (France) Jean Borotra (France) Jacques Brugnon
- Runners-up: (United Kingdom) Pat Hughes (United Kingdom) Fred Perry
- Score: 6–0, 4–6, 3–6, 7–5, 7–5

Details
- Draw: 64 (5Q)
- Seeds: 4

Events
Singles	men	women		boys	girls
Doubles	men	women	mixed	boys	girls
- Wimbledon Championships

George Lott and John Van Ryn were the defending champions, but Lott did not compete. Van Ryn competed with Wilmer Allison, but lost in the semifinals to Jacques Brugnon and Henri Cochet.

Borotra and Brugnon defeated Pat Hughes and Fred Perry in the final, 6–0, 4–6, 3–6, 7–5, 7–5 to win the gentlemen's doubles tennis title at the 1932 Wimbledon Championship.

== Seeds ==
1. (United States) Wilmer Allison / (United States) John Van Ryn (semifinals)
2. (Australia) Jack Crawford / (Australia) Harry Hopman (third round)
3. (United Kingdom) Pat Hughes / (United Kingdom) Fred Perry (final)
4. (France) Jean Borotra / (France) Jacques Brugnon (champions)

Click on the seed number of a player to go to their draw section.

== Draw ==
Key

- Q = Qualifier
- WC = Wild card
- LL = Lucky loser
- Alt = Alternate
- ITF = ITF entry
- PR = Protected ranking
- SR = Special ranking
- SE = Special exempt
- JE = Junior exempt
- JR = Junior Accelerator Programme entrant
- CO = College Accelerator Programme entrant
- NG = Next Gen Accelerator Program entrant
- w/o = Walkover
- r = Retired
- d = Defaulted

=== Finals ===
Quarterfinals
1	(United States) Wilmer Allison (United States) John Van Ryn	6	3	8	6
(Czechoslovakia) Roderich Menzel (United Kingdom) John Olliff	4	6	6	3
4	(France) Jean Borotra (France) Jacques Brugnon
(United Kingdom) Harry Lee (United Kingdom) Keats Lester	w/o
(United States) Gregory Mangin (United States) Sidney Wood	5	5	3
3	(United Kingdom) Pat Hughes (United Kingdom) Fred Perry	7	7	6
(France) Christian Boussus (France) André Merlin	6	6	3	6
(Japan) Ryuki Miki (Japan) Jiro Sato	3	4	6	1

Semifinals
1	(United States) Wilmer Allison (United States) John Van Ryn	3	2	4
4	(France) Jean Borotra (France) Jacques Brugnon	6	6	6
3	(United Kingdom) Pat Hughes (United Kingdom) Fred Perry	8	6	6
(France) Christian Boussus (France) André Merlin	6	1	3

Final
4	(France) Jean Borotra (France) Jacques Brugnon	6	4	3	7	7
3	(United Kingdom) Pat Hughes (United Kingdom) Fred Perry	0	6	6	5	5

=== Top half ===
==== Section 1 ====
First round
1	(United States) Wilmer Allison (United States) John Van Ryn	6	9	14
(Egypt) Jacques Grandguillot (Egypt) Pierre Grandguillot	2	7	12
(United Kingdom) Brian Gilbert (United Kingdom) Norman Latchford	4	4	6	2
(United Kingdom) Alan Brown (United Kingdom) Bob Tinkler	6	6	3	6
(United Kingdom) Jimmy Nuthall (United Kingdom) Raymond Tuckey	1	8	4	4
(United Kingdom) Ian Collins (United Kingdom) Colin Gregory	6	6	6	6
(India) Janmeja Charanjiva (India) Jagat Mohan Lal	3	6	0
(Australia) Jack Clemenger (Australia) Cliff Sproule	6	8	6
(United Kingdom) Eric Attewell (United Kingdom) Arthur Hill	3	7	6	6
(Austria) Hermann Artens (Austria) Harry Kinzl	6	5	2	3
(United Kingdom) Cyril Fletcher (United Kingdom) John Fletcher	6	6	6
(France) Paul Féret (France) Emmanuel du Plaix	2	4	4
Q	(United Kingdom) Hugh Mackinnon (United Kingdom) Peter Young	9	4	6	7	3
(United Kingdom) Harvey Hillier (United Kingdom) David Williams	11	6	4	5	6
(United Kingdom) Claude Metcalf (United Kingdom) Arthur Vinall	4	5	4
(Czechoslovakia) Roderich Menzel (United Kingdom) John Olliff	6	7	6

Second round
1	(United States) W Allison (United States) J Van Ryn	7	6	6
(United Kingdom) A Brown (United Kingdom) R Tinkler	5	2	4
(United Kingdom) I Collins (United Kingdom) C Gregory	4	6	4	7	6
(Australia) J Clemenger (Australia) C Sproule	6	3	6	5	2
(United Kingdom) E Attewell (United Kingdom) A Hill	3	6	6	10
(United Kingdom) C Fletcher (United Kingdom) J Fletcher	6	8	4	12
(United Kingdom) H Hillier (United Kingdom) D Williams	7	5	4
(Czechoslovakia) R Menzel (United Kingdom) J Olliff	9	7	6

Third round
1	(United States) W Allison (United States) J Van Ryn	6	6	6
(United Kingdom) I Collins (United Kingdom) J Gregory	4	1	4
(United Kingdom) C Fletcher (United Kingdom) J Fletcher	10	5	6	6	1
(Czechoslovakia) R Menzel (United Kingdom) J Olliff	12	7	1	3	6

Quarterfinals
1	(United States) W Allison (United States) J Van Ryn	6	3	8	6
(Czechoslovakia) R Menzel (United Kingdom) J Olliff	4	6	6	3

==== Section 2 ====
First round
4	(France) Jean Borotra (France) Jacques Brugnon	6	7	6
(United Kingdom) RG Bernard (United Kingdom) Alfred Ingram	4	5	3
(United Kingdom) Nigel Sharpe (United Kingdom) Patrick Wheatley	3	3	6	1
(United States) Frank Shields (South Africa) Pat Spence	6	6	3	6
Q	(United Kingdom) Tony Crossley (United Kingdom) RG Stone	6	2	6	9
(United Kingdom) Douglas Freshwater (United Kingdom) Gwyn Tuckett	2	6	4	7
(United Kingdom) Jack Hillyard (Monaco) Vladimir Landau	w/o
(United Kingdom) Kenneth Gandar-Dower (United Kingdom) Frank Wilde
(New Zealand) Buster Andrews (New Zealand) Cam Malfroy	4	6	5	3
(United Kingdom) Harry Lee (United Kingdom) Keats Lester	6	4	7	6
(Japan) Takeo Kuwabara (India) Atri Madan Mohan	6	6	8
(Austria) Franz Matejka (Republic of Ireland) Harold Price	3	2	6
(Denmark) Anker Jacobsen (Denmark) Arne Rasmussen	4	2	2
(United Kingdom) Herman David (United Kingdom) Eric Peters	6	6	6
(United Kingdom) Douglas Hodges (United Kingdom) William Powell	3	6	6	4	6
(Romania) Nicolas Magaloff (Soviet Union) Sergei Rodzianko	6	2	1	6	2

Second round
4	(France) J Borotra (France) J Brugnon	11	6	6
(United States) F Shields (South Africa) P Spence	9	0	2
Q	(United Kingdom) A Crossley (United Kingdom) RG Stone	3	7	4
(United Kingdom) K Gandar-Dower (United Kingdom) F Wilde	6	9	6
(United Kingdom) H Lee (United Kingdom) K Lester	6	6	5	6
(Japan) T Kuwabara (India) AM Mohan	4	2	7	4
(United Kingdom) H David (United Kingdom) E Peters	6	11	6
(United Kingdom) D Hodges (United Kingdom) W Powell	3	9	1

Third round
4	(France) J Borotra (France) J Brugnon	6	6	8
(United Kingdom) K Gandar-Dower (United Kingdom) F Wilde	3	1	6
(United Kingdom) H Lee (United Kingdom) K Lester	2	5	6	6	6
(United Kingdom) H David (United Kingdom) E Peters	6	7	1	2	2

Quarterfinals
4	(France) J Borotra (France) J Brugnon
(United Kingdom) H Lee (United Kingdom) K Lester	w/o

=== Bottom half ===
==== Section 3 ====
First round
(United Kingdom) Teddy Higgs (United Kingdom) Richard Turnbull	8	7	6	2	8
(United Kingdom) Brian Finnigan (New Zealand) James Giesen	6	5	8	6	6
(Argentina) Carlos Magrane (United Kingdom) Jimmy Reddall	6	6	4	6
(India) Hassan Ali Fyzee (India) Hira-Lal Soni	1	2	6	3
(United States) Gregory Mangin (United States) Sidney Wood	6	6	6
(Netherlands) Josef Knottenbelt (Netherlands) Hendrik Timmer	2	2	3
(Switzerland) Hector Fisher (Spain) Enrique Maier	6	6	6
(Germany) Heinrich Kleinschroth (United Kingdom) Walter Michelmore	2	1	1
(Japan) Iwao Aoki (Republic of Ireland) George Lyttleton-Rogers	6	7	6
(United Kingdom) Billy Collins (United Kingdom) Philip Glover	2	5	4
(United Kingdom) Jock Findlay (United Kingdom) Lewis Michell	6	6	5	11
(United Kingdom) Cyril Eames (United Kingdom) Laddie Wheatcroft	4	1	7	9
Q	(United Kingdom) Norman Taylor (United Kingdom) Orson Wright	w/o
(France) Antoine Gentien (France) Pierre Henri Landry
Q	(United Kingdom) Wilfred Freeman (Netherlands) DP van Meurs	w/o
3	(United Kingdom) Pat Hughes (United Kingdom) Fred Perry

Second round
(United Kingdom) E Higgs (United Kingdom) R Turnbull	4	5	4
(Argentina) C Magrane (United Kingdom) J Reddall	6	6	6
(United States) G Mangin (United States) S Wood	4	6	6	6
(Switzerland) H Fisher (Spain) E Maier	6	3	4	4
(Japan) I Aoki (Republic of Ireland) G Lyttleton-Rogers	7	14	4	6
(United Kingdom) J Findlay (United Kingdom) L Michell	5	12	6	3
(France) A Gentien (France) PH Landry	4	2	6
3	(United Kingdom) P Hughes (United Kingdom) F Perry	6	6	8

Third round
(Argentina) C Magrane (United Kingdom) J Reddall	2	5	4
(United States) G Mangin (United States) S Wood	6	7	6
(Japan) I Aoki (Republic of Ireland) G Lyttleton-Rogers	3	3	5
3	(United Kingdom) P Hughes (United Kingdom) F Perry	6	6	7

Quarterfinals
(United States) G Mangin (United States) S Wood	5	5	3
3	(United Kingdom) P Hughes (United Kingdom) F Perry	7	7	6

==== Section 4 ====
First round
(United Kingdom) Ted Avory (United Kingdom) Dickie Ritchie	5	6	4	6	6
Q	(United Kingdom) Malcolm Russell (United Kingdom) Pat Sherwood	7	4	6	4	0
(United Kingdom) Leighton Crawford (United Kingdom) Geoffrey de Ste. Croix	3	2	3
(United Kingdom) Colin Ritchie (South Africa) Gerald Sherwell	6	6	6
(Czechoslovakia) Ladislav Hecht (Czechoslovakia) Josef Šíba	3	6	3	2
(France) Christian Boussus (France) André Merlin	6	2	6	6
(United Kingdom) Stan Harris (Belgium) Guy Van Zuylen	1	6	8	7
(United Kingdom) WB Henderson (United Kingdom) Jack Lysaght	6	3	6	5
(Japan) Ryuki Miki (Japan) Jiro Sato	7	6	6
(Hungary) Béla von Kehrling (United Kingdom) Charles Kingsley	5	2	4
(United Kingdom) Tony Buzzard (United Kingdom) Edward Buzzard	4	6	2	4
(Germany) Gottfried von Cramm (Germany) Louis Haensch	6	4	6	6
(United Kingdom) Freddie Della Porta (United Kingdom) Harold Gunn	7	6	5	6
(United Kingdom) John Leader (Poland) Ignacy Tłoczyński	5	2	7	1
(United Kingdom) Roy Poland (United Kingdom) CH Watson	4	3	0
2	(Australia) Jack Crawford (Australia) Harry Hopman	6	6	6

Second round
(United Kingdom) E Avory (United Kingdom) R Ritchie	8	1	7	6
(United Kingdom) C Ritchie (South Africa) G Sherwell	6	6	5	4
(France) C Boussus (France) A Merlin	7	8	11
(United Kingdom) S Harris (Belgium) G Van Zuylen	5	6	9
(Japan) T Miki (Japan) J Sato	6	6	6	6
(Germany) G von Cramm (Germany) L Haensch	2	4	7	3
(United Kingdom) A Della Porta (United Kingdom) H Gunn	4	2	5
2	(Australia) J Crawford (Australia) H Hopman	6	6	7

Third round
(United Kingdom) E Avory (United Kingdom) R Ritchie	4	5	1
(France) C Boussus (France) A Merlin	6	7	6
(Japan) T Miki (Japan) J Sato	6	10	6	3	9
2	(Australia) J Crawford (Australia) H Hopman	4	12	2	6	7

Quarterfinals
(France) C Boussus (France) A Merlin	6	6	3	6
(Japan) T Miki (Japan) J Sato	3	4	6	1
