= 1926 Wimbledon Championships – Men's doubles =

Men's doubles
- 1926 Wimbledon Championships

Final
- Champions: (France) Jacques Brugnon (France) Henri Cochet
- Runners-up: (United States) Howard Kinsey (United States) Vincent Richards
- Score: 7–5, 4–6, 6–3, 6–2

Details
- Draw: 64 (4Q)
- Seeds: –

Events
Singles	men	women		boys	girls
Doubles	men	women	mixed	boys	girls
- Wimbledon Championships

Jean Borotra and René Lacoste were the defending champions, but decided not to play together. Lacoste partnered with Paul Féret but withdrew before the start of the competition. Borotra played with Léonce Aslangul, but lost to Jacques Brugnon and Henri Cochet in the quarterfinals.

Brugnon and Cochet defeated Howard Kinsey and Vincent Richards in the final, 7–5, 4–6, 6–3, 6–2 to win the gentlemen's doubles tennis title at the 1926 Wimbledon Championship.

The Duke of York, the future King George VI, remains the only member of the British royal family to ever compete at Wimbledon after competing in the men's doubles tournament. Partnering with his mentor and advisor Louis Greig, the pair were eliminated in the first round by former champions Herbert Roper Barrett and Arthur Gore.

== Draw ==
Key

- Q = Qualifier
- WC = Wild card
- LL = Lucky loser
- Alt = Alternate
- ITF = ITF entry
- PR = Protected ranking
- SR = Special ranking
- SE = Special exempt
- JE = Junior exempt
- JR = Junior Accelerator Programme entrant
- CO = College Accelerator Programme entrant
- NG = Next Gen Accelerator Program entrant
- w/o = Walkover
- r = Retired
- d = Defaulted

=== Finals ===
Quarterfinals
(Hungary) Béla von Kehrling (Netherlands) Christiaan van Lennep	6	6	6
(United Kingdom) Cyril Eames (United Kingdom) Teddy Higgs	4	3	2
(France) Jacques Brugnon (France) Henri Cochet	3	6	6	3	8
(France) Léonce Aslangul (France) Jean Borotra	6	0	3	6	6
(United Kingdom) Norman Latchford (United Kingdom) Robert Pryce-Jones	2	2	3
(United Kingdom) Bunny Austin (United Kingdom) Randolph Lycett	6	6	6
(United States) Howard Kinsey (United States) Vincent Richards	7	3	13	7
(United Kingdom) Gordon Crole-Rees (United Kingdom) Charles Kingsley	5	6	11	5

Semifinals
(Hungary) Béla von Kehrling (Netherlands) Christiaan van Lennep	7	4	2
(France) Jacques Brugnon (France) Henri Cochet	9	6	6
(United Kingdom) Bunny Austin (United Kingdom) Randolph Lycett	5	4	4
(United States) Howard Kinsey (United States) Vincent Richards	7	6	6

Final
(France) Jacques Brugnon (France) Henri Cochet	7	4	6	6
(United States) Howard Kinsey (United States) Vincent Richards	5	6	3	2

=== Top half ===
==== Section 1 ====
First round
(Hungary) Béla von Kehrling (Netherlands) Christiaan van Lennep	6	5	7	6
(United States) Jack Olmsted (France) Claude de Ricou	1	7	5	0
(United Kingdom) Sidney Hepburn (United Kingdom) Tim Horn	6	1	4	6	6
Q	(United Kingdom) Charles Dixon (United Kingdom) Frank Wallers	2	6	6	4	3
(United Kingdom) Herbert Roper Barrett (United Kingdom) Arthur Gore	6	6	6
(United Kingdom) Louis Greig (United Kingdom) Prince Albert, Duke of York	1	3	2
(United Kingdom) Royden Dash (United Kingdom) Roy Poland	2	2	4
(France) Max Decugis (France) André Gobert	6	6	6
(New Zealand) Frank Fisher (Soviet Union) Sergei Rodzianko	w/o
(United Kingdom) Cyril Eames (United Kingdom) Teddy Higgs
(South Africa) Julien Lezard (South Africa) Pat Spence	10	6	5
(Spain) Eduardo Flaquer (United Kingdom) Donald Greig	12	8	7
(United Kingdom) Ambrose Dudley (United States) Donald Stralem	4	6	6	6
(Netherlands) Marinus van der Feen (Netherlands) Gerard Leembruggen	6	1	1	2
Q	(United Kingdom) Scotter Owen (United Kingdom) Francis Stowe	7	6	6
(United States) Craig Biddle (United Kingdom) A. Wallis Myers	5	2	1

Second round
(Hungary) B von Kehrling (Netherlands) C van Lennep	6	6	6
(United Kingdom) S Hepburn (United Kingdom) T Horn	2	1	4
(United Kingdom) HR Barrett (United Kingdom) A Gore	3	3	6
(France) M Decugis (France) A Gobert	6	6	8
(United Kingdom) C Eames (United Kingdom) E Higgs	8	6	6
(Spain) E Flaquer (United Kingdom) D Greig	6	3	4
(United Kingdom) A Dudley (United States) D Stralem	4	8	8	0
Q	(United Kingdom) S Owen (United Kingdom) F Stowe	6	10	6	6

Third round
(Hungary) B von Kehrling (Netherlands) C van Lennep	4	1	8	6	6
(France) M Decugis (France) A Gobert	6	6	6	2	2
(United Kingdom) C Eames (United Kingdom) E Higgs	6	6	6
Q	(United Kingdom) S Owen (United Kingdom) F Stowe	1	4	2

Quarterfinals
(Hungary) B von Kehrling (Netherlands) C van Lennep	6	6	6
(United Kingdom) C Eames (United Kingdom) E Higgs	4	3	2

==== Section 2 ====
First round
(Czechoslovakia) Jan Koželuh (Czechoslovakia) Ladislav Žemla	3	6	6	8
(United Kingdom) Alex Drew (United Kingdom) William Radcliffe	6	3	1	6
(Austria) Paul Brick (Austria) Franz Glanz	1	3	6
(United Kingdom) Ian Collins (United Kingdom) Billy Collins	6	6	8
(United Kingdom) Major Ritchie (United States) Jimmy Van Alen	7	7	3	4	6
(Switzerland) Charles Aeschlimann (United Kingdom) George Cholmondeley	5	5	6	6	3
(Netherlands) Gerard Scheurleer (Netherlands) M Wetselaar	1	2	2
(France) Jacques Brugnon (France) Henri Cochet	6	6	6
(United Kingdom) Leonard Lyle (United Kingdom) Albert Prebble	6	3	6	6
(United Kingdom) JCF Simpson (United Kingdom) Douglas Watson	1	6	3	4
(Argentina) Ronaldo Boyd (Argentina) Guillermo Robson	6	6	6
(United Kingdom) Leslie Godfree (United Kingdom) Patrick Wheatley	4	3	4
(United Kingdom) Jack Hillyard (Canada) Henry Mayes	4	6	6	1
(France) Léonce Aslangul (France) Jean Borotra	6	8	4	6
(India) DM Bhalla (India) R Jagmohan	4	3	3
(United Kingdom) Leighton Crawford (United Kingdom) Pat Hughes	6	6	6

Second round
(Czechoslovakia) J Koželuh (Czechoslovakia) L Žemla	6	6	6
(United Kingdom) I Collins (United Kingdom) W Collins	1	4	3
(United Kingdom) M Ritchie (United States) J Van Alen	8	1	2
(France) J Brugnon (France) H Cochet	10	6	6
(United Kingdom) L Lyle (United Kingdom) A Prebble	11	5	6	2
(Argentina) R Boyd (Argentina) G Robson	13	7	2	6
(France) L Aslangul (France) J Borotra	6	6	6
(United Kingdom) FRL Crawford (United Kingdom) P Hughes	2	3	4

Third round
(Czechoslovakia) J Koželuh (Czechoslovakia) L Žemla	9	3	2
(France) J Brugnon (France) H Cochet	11	6	6
(Argentina) R Boyd (Argentina) G Robson
(France) L Aslangul (France) J Borotra

Quarterfinals
(France) J Brugnon (France) H Cochet	3	6	6	3	8
(France) L Aslangul (France) J Borotra	6	0	3	6	6

=== Bottom half ===
==== Section 3 ====
First round
(New Zealand) JF Park (United Kingdom) Henry Standring	3	6	4	6	4
Q	(United Kingdom) Lewis Michell (United Kingdom) JE Pogson-Smith	6	2	6	3	6
(United Kingdom) J Duminy (United Kingdom) Charles Roupell	1	3	3
(Switzerland) Hector Fisher (Canada) David Morrice	6	6	6
(Denmark) Axel Petersen (Denmark) Einer Ulrich	6	6	6
(United Kingdom) Maurice Summerson (United Kingdom) Cecil Tindell-Green	4	0	2
(United Kingdom) WHM Aitken (Republic of Ireland) Noel Holmes	5	2	6	7
(United Kingdom) Norman Latchford (United Kingdom) RDN Pryce-Jones	7	6	1	9
(United Kingdom) Walter Crawley (United Kingdom) Percival Davson	2	8	4	6	6
(Mexico) Ignacio de la Borbolla (Belgium) Georges Watson	6	6	6	2	8
(United Kingdom) Frank Jarvis (United Kingdom) Keats Lester	6	4	4
(United Kingdom) Bunny Austin (United Kingdom) Randolph Lycett	8	6	6
(United Kingdom) HE Forman (United Kingdom) WHA Hunt	4	1	6	3
(Netherlands) Cornelis Bryan (Netherlands) Hendrik Timmer	6	6	3	6
LL	(India) Athar-Ali Fyzee (India) Hassan Ali Fyzee	7	6	4	4	6
(United Kingdom) Arthur Berger (United Kingdom) RG Bernard	5	4	6	6	4

Second round
Q	(United Kingdom) L Michell (United Kingdom) JE Pogson-Smith	6	6	4	4	8
(Switzerland) H Fisher (Canada) D Morrice	4	3	6	6	6
(Denmark) A Petersen (Denmark) E Ulrich	1	1	6	6	3
(United Kingdom) N Latchford (United Kingdom) RDN Pryce-Jones	6	6	3	1	6
(Mexico) I de la Borbolla (Belgium) G Watson	6	2	2	3
(United Kingdom) H Austin (United Kingdom) R Lycett	3	6	6	6
(Netherlands) C Bryan (Netherlands) H Timmer	6	6	6
LL	(India) AA Fyzee (India) HA Fyzee	2	1	1

Third round
Q	(United Kingdom) L Michell (United Kingdom) JE Pogson-Smith	4	5	4
(United Kingdom) N Latchford (United Kingdom) RDN Pryce-Jones	6	7	6
(United Kingdom) H Austin (United Kingdom) R Lycett	6	6	6
(Netherlands) C Bryan (Netherlands) H Timmer	4	3	3

Quarterfinals
(United Kingdom) N Latchford (United Kingdom) RDN Pryce-Jones	2	2	3
(United Kingdom) H Austin (United Kingdom) R Lycett	6	6	6

==== Section 4 ====
First round
(United Kingdom) Colin Gregory (United Kingdom) Reginald Knight	3	8	0
(United Kingdom) Douglas Hodges (South Africa) Gerald Sherwell	6	10	6
(India) Sandford Bobb (India) Bertie Meyer
(France) Paul Féret (France) René Lacoste	w/o
(United Kingdom) George Fletcher (Australia) DJR Sumner	4	2	6	4
(Australia) LJ Carr (Australia) EL Jones	6	6	4	6
(United States) Howard Kinsey (United States) Vincent Richards	6	8	6
(Romania) Nicolae Mișu (United Kingdom) Nigel Sharpe	4	6	3
(United Kingdom) CR Havers (United Kingdom) Basil Lawrence	4	4	6	6	6
(United Kingdom) Brian Gilbert (United Kingdom) Arthur Yencken	6	6	2	2	3
(United Kingdom) Gordon Crole-Rees (United Kingdom) Charles Kingsley	6	6	6
(United Kingdom) Harold Aitken (United Kingdom) Alfred Ingram	2	3	2
(United Kingdom) St John Evers (United Kingdom) Theodore Mavrogordato	6	4	6	6
(Argentina) Hector Cattaruzza (Argentina) Enrique Obarrio	1	6	1	3
Q	(United Kingdom) John Pennycuick (United Kingdom) Douglas Powell	3	3	8	2
(United Kingdom) Harvey Mackintosh (United Kingdom) WB Stott	6	6	6	6

Second round
(United Kingdom) D Hodges (South Africa) G Sherwell	3	1	12	4
(India) S Bobb (India) B Meyer	6	6	10	6
(Australia) LJ Carr (Australia) EL Jones	1	2	2
(United States) H Kinsey (United States) V Richards	6	6	6
(United Kingdom) CR Havers (United Kingdom) B Lawrence	3	1	3
(United Kingdom) G Crole-Rees (United Kingdom) C Kingsley	6	6	6
(United Kingdom) StJ Evers (United Kingdom) T Mavrogordato	4	6	2	6	3
(United Kingdom) H Mackintosh (United Kingdom) WB Stott	6	4	6	4	6

Third round
(India) S Bobb (India) B Meyer	4	0	3
(United States) H Kinsey (United States) V Richards	6	6	6
(United Kingdom) G Crole-Rees (United Kingdom) C Kingsley	6	6	6
(United Kingdom) H Mackintosh (United Kingdom) WB Stott	1	3	2

Quarterfinals
(United States) H Kinsey (United States) V Richards	7	3	13	7
(United Kingdom) G Crole-Rees (United Kingdom) C Kingsley	5	6	11	5
