= 1928 Wimbledon Championships – Men's doubles =

Men's doubles
- 1928 Wimbledon Championships

Final
- Champions: (France) Jacques Brugnon (France) Henri Cochet
- Runners-up: (Australia) Jack Hawkes (Australia) Gerald Patterson
- Score: 13–11, 6–4, 6–4

Details
- Draw: 64 (5Q)
- Seeds: 4

Events
Singles	men	women		boys	girls
Doubles	men	women	mixed	boys	girls
- Wimbledon Championships

Frank Hunter and Bill Tilden were the defending champions, but lost in the semifinals to Jack Hawkes and Gerald Patterson.

Jacques Brugnon and Henri Cochet defeated Hawkes and Patterson in the final, 13–11, 6–4, 6–4 to win the gentlemen's doubles tennis title at the 1928 Wimbledon Championship.

== Seeds ==
1. (United States) Frank Hunter / (United States) Bill Tilden (semifinals)
2. (France) Jacques Brugnon / (France) Henri Cochet (champions)
3. (United States) John Hennessey / (United States) George Lott (semifinals)
4. (Australia) Jack Hawkes / (Australia) Gerald Patterson (final)

Click on the seed number of a player to go to their draw section.

== Draw ==
Key

- Q = Qualifier
- WC = Wild card
- LL = Lucky loser
- Alt = Alternate
- ITF = ITF entry
- PR = Protected ranking
- SR = Special ranking
- SE = Special exempt
- JE = Junior exempt
- JR = Junior Accelerator Programme entrant
- CO = College Accelerator Programme entrant
- NG = Next Gen Accelerator Program entrant
- w/o = Walkover
- r = Retired
- d = Defaulted

=== Finals ===
Quarterfinals
1	(United States) Frank Hunter (United States) Bill Tilden	4	6	6	6
(United Kingdom) Gordon Crole-Rees (United Kingdom) Cyril Eames	6	1	3	2
4	(Australia) Jack Hawkes (Australia) Gerald Patterson	6	6	4	6
(Argentina) Ronaldo Boyd (Argentina) Guillermo Robson	4	4	6	3
2	(France) Jacques Brugnon (France) Henri Cochet	6	6	6
(Switzerland) Hector Fisher (Netherlands) Hendrik Timmer	3	3	2
3	(United States) John Hennessey (United States) George Lott	6	6	1	6
(Australia) Jack Cummings (Australia) Gar Moon	1	1	6	3

Semifinals
1	(United States) Frank Hunter (United States) Bill Tilden	7	7	6	6	10
4	(Australia) Jack Hawkes (Australia) Gerald Patterson	9	9	4	4	8
2	(France) Jacques Brugnon (France) Henri Cochet	11	6	3	7
3	(United States) John Hennessey (United States) George Lott	9	4	6	5

Final
4	(Australia) Jack Hawkes (Australia) Gerald Patterson	11	4	4
2	(France) Jacques Brugnon (France) Henri Cochet	13	6	6

=== Top half ===
==== Section 1 ====
First round
1	(United States) Frank Hunter (United States) Bill Tilden	6	6	6
Q	(United Kingdom) Ted Avory (United Kingdom) Colin Higgins	2	3	0
(Germany) Friedrich Frenz (Germany) Feo Hartz	4	6	7	3	1
(Republic of Ireland) Denis O'Callaghan (Republic of Ireland) Charles Scroope	6	4	5	6	6
(France) René de Buzelet (France) Édouard Borotra	6	9	6
Q	(United Kingdom) Lewis Michell (United Kingdom) Arthur Vinall	3	7	4
(Republic of Ireland) George Lyttleton-Rogers (France) Emmanuel du Plaix	4	2	2
(United Kingdom) Douglas Hodges (United Kingdom) Keats Lester	6	6	6
Q	(United Kingdom) Laddie Wheatcroft (United Kingdom) Ulysses Williams	3	6	6	6
LL	(New Zealand) John Peacock (New Zealand) Russell Young	6	3	2	2
(United Kingdom) Leighton Crawford (United Kingdom) Eric Peters	3	0	6	5
(United Kingdom) Bunny Austin (United Kingdom) Ian Collins	6	6	3	7
(India) Athar-Ali Fyzee (India) Hassan Ali Fyzee	4	5	2
(Hungary) Béla von Kehrling (Czechoslovakia) Jan Koželuh	6	7	6
(United Kingdom) Gordon Crole-Rees (United Kingdom) Cyril Eames	7	6	6
(Austria) Hermann Artens (Austria) Franz Matejka	5	4	2

Second round
1	(United States) F Hunter (United States) W Tilden	6	6	6
(Republic of Ireland) D O'Callaghan (Republic of Ireland) C Scroope	3	3	2
(France) R de Buzelet (France) E Borotra	7	4	6	6
(United Kingdom) D Hodges (United Kingdom) K Lester	5	6	2	1
Q	(United Kingdom) I Wheatcroft (United Kingdom) U Williams	6	3	6	2	1
(United Kingdom) H Austin (United Kingdom) I Collins	3	6	4	6	6
(Hungary) B von Kehrling (Czechoslovakia) J Koželuh	3	9	5	6	5
(United Kingdom) G Crole-Rees (United Kingdom) C Eames	6	7	7	4	7

Third round
1	(United States) F Hunter (United States) W Tilden	6	6	5	5	6
(France) R de Buzelet (France) E Borotra	4	4	7	7	2
(United Kingdom) H Austin (United Kingdom) I Collins	2	3	4
(United Kingdom) G Crole-Rees (United Kingdom) C Eames	6	6	6

Quarterfinals
1	(United States) F Hunter (United States) W Tilden	4	6	6	6
(United Kingdom) G Crole-Rees (United Kingdom) C Eames	6	1	3	2

==== Section 2 ====
First round
4	(Australia) Jack Hawkes (Australia) Gerald Patterson	6	6	6
(United Kingdom) Sidney Hepburn (Belgium) André Lacroix	1	4	2
(India) Mohammed Sleem (India) Hira-Lal Soni	6	6	2	4
(United Kingdom) Teddy Higgs (United Kingdom) Patrick Wheatley	8	4	6	6
(Greece) Max Balli (Greece) Augustos Zerlendis	0	3	4
(France) Christian Boussus (France) Pierre Henri Landry	6	6	6
(United Kingdom) Lionel Alderson (United Kingdom) Maurice Summerson	1	1	0
(France) Jean Borotra (France) René Lacoste	6	6	6
(Australia) Norman Brookes (United States) Wilbur Coen	6	6	6
(United Kingdom) Guy Cooper (United Kingdom) Campbell Rodger	1	3	3
(South Africa) John Holthouse (South Africa) HL Walcott
(Italy) Roberto Bocciardo (Italy) Giorgio de Stefani	w/o
(United States) Henry Brunie (United States) Sidney Wood	4	10	5
(United Kingdom) Billy Collins (United Kingdom) William Radcliffe	6	12	7
(Argentina) Ronaldo Boyd (Argentina) Guillermo Robson	6	6	6
(United Kingdom) Norman Latchford (United Kingdom) RDN Pryce-Jones	1	4	4

Second round
4	(Australia) J Hawkes (Australia) G Patterson	7	9	6
(United Kingdom) E Higgs (United Kingdom) P Wheatley	5	7	3
(France) C Boussus (France) PH Landry	5	6	4	4
(France) J Borotra (France) R Lacoste	7	4	6	6
(Australia) N Brookes (United States) W Coen	6	6	7
(South Africa) J Holthouse (South Africa) HL Walcott	3	4	5
(United Kingdom) W Collins (United Kingdom) W Radcliffe	3	3	4
(Argentina) R Boyd (Argentina) G Robson	6	6	6

Third round
4	(Australia) J Hawkes (Australia) G Patterson	6	5	6	9
(France) J Borotra (France) R Lacoste	3	7	4	7
(Australia) N Brookes (United States) W Coen	6	2	3	6	4
(Argentina) R Boyd (Argentina) G Robson	4	6	6	3	6

Quarterfinals
4	(Australia) J Hawkes (Australia) G Patterson	6	6	4	6
(Argentina) R Boyd (Argentina) G Robson	4	4	6	3

=== Bottom half ===
==== Section 3 ====
First round
2	(France) Jacques Brugnon (France) Henri Cochet
(United Kingdom) Herbert Roper Barrett (New Zealand) Frank Fisher	w/o
(United Kingdom) Edward Dearman (United Kingdom) William Powell	3	0	1
(Australia) Jack Crawford (Australia) Harry Hopman	6	6	6
(United States) Bill Lingelbach (United States) Edward Mather	6	6	6
(United Kingdom) Turner Cole (United Kingdom) RC Wackett	3	4	4
(United Kingdom) Pat Hughes (United Kingdom) Dudley Pitt	6	6	5	5	7
(United Kingdom) Brian Gilbert (United Kingdom) GR Westmacott	3	3	7	7	5
(United Kingdom) George Cholmondeley (Canada) Henry Mayes	6	5	6	3	6
(United Kingdom) Jack Hillyard (South Africa) Julien Lezard	3	7	1	6	1
(United States) Jack Olmsted (France) Claude de Ricou	8	4	6	6
(United Kingdom) Harvey Mackintosh (United Kingdom) WB Stott	6	6	1	4
(United Kingdom) Percival Davson (United Kingdom) Theodore Mavrogordato	6	7	2	6
(Argentina) Hector Cattaruzza (Argentina) Adriano Zappa	2	5	6	4
(Italy) Placido Gaslini (Italy) Uberto de Morpurgo	w/o
(Switzerland) Hector Fisher (Netherlands) Hendrik Timmer

Second round
2	(France) J Brugnon (France) H Cochet	10	6	7	4	6
(Australia) J Crawford (Australia) H Hopman	8	2	9	6	4
(United States) W Lingelbach (United States) E Mather	3	4	7	5
(United Kingdom) P Hughes (United Kingdom) D Pitt	6	6	5	7
(United Kingdom) G Cholmondeley (Canada) H Mayes	6	2	3	2
(United States) J Olmsted (France) C de Ricou	3	6	6	6
(United Kingdom) P Davson (United Kingdom) T Mavrogordato	5	7	1	0^{r}
(Switzerland) H Fisher (Netherlands) H Timmer	7	5	6	4

Third round
2	(France) J Brugnon (France) H Cochet	6	6	6
(United Kingdom) P Hughes (United Kingdom) D Pitt	2	2	4
(United States) J Olmsted (France) C de Ricou	7	2	7
(Switzerland) H Fisher (Netherlands) H Timmer	9	6	9

Quarterfinals
2	(France) J Brugnon (France) H Cochet	6	6	6
(Switzerland) H Fisher (Netherlands) H Timmer	3	3	2

==== Section 4 ====
First round
3	(United States) John Hennessey (United States) George Lott	7	7	6
(France) Roger Danet (France) Antoine Gentien	5	5	3
(United Kingdom) Colin Gregory (United Kingdom) Charles Kingsley	3	2	6	6	6
(United Kingdom) Randolph Lycett (South Africa) Pat Spence	6	6	3	2	4
(New Zealand) Buster Andrews (South Africa) Norman Farquharson	7	2	0	6	4
(United Kingdom) Arthur Lowe (South Africa) Gerald Sherwell	5	6	6	2	6
(United Kingdom) Nigel Sharpe (United Kingdom) Noel Turnbull
(India) Sydney Jacob (Czechoslovakia) Roderich Menzel	w/o
(Australia) Jack Cummings (Australia) Gar Moon	6	6	6
Q	(United Kingdom) Arthur Belgrave (United Kingdom) EC Penny	1	2	2
(United Kingdom) Leslie Godfree (United Kingdom) Donald Greig	11	6	6
(United Kingdom) John Olliff (United Kingdom) Douglas Powell	9	0	1
(United Kingdom) HE Forman (United Kingdom) WHA Hunt	6	10	5	6
Q	(United Kingdom) Cyril Banks (United Kingdom) Richard Pickersgill	2	8	7	1
(Germany) Heinrich Kleinschroth (Germany) Friedrich Rahe
(India) EV Bobb (United States) U Kramet	w/o

Second round
3	(United States) J Hennessey (United States) G Lott	6	4	6	6
(United Kingdom) J Gregory (United Kingdom) C Kingsley	3	6	0	3
(United Kingdom) A Lowe (South Africa) G Sherwell	4	6	6	6
(United Kingdom) N Sharpe (United Kingdom) N Turnbull	6	2	1	4
(Australia) R Cummings (Australia) E Moon	6	3	7	8
(United Kingdom) L Godfree (United Kingdom) D Greig	4	6	5	6
(United Kingdom) HE Forman (United Kingdom) WHA Hunt	1	6	0	4
(Germany) H Kleinschroth (Germany) F Rahe	6	2	6	6

Third round
3	(United States) J Hennessey (United States) G Lott	6	6	6
(United Kingdom) A Lowe (South Africa) G Sherwell	2	2	3
(Australia) R Cummings (Australia) E Moon	6	6	13
(Germany) H Kleinschroth (Germany) F Rahe	1	4	11

Quarterfinals
3	(United States) J Hennessey (United States) G Lott	6	6	1	6
(Australia) R Cummings (Australia) E Moon	1	1	6	3
