= 1926 Wimbledon Championships – Men's singles =

Men's singles
- 1926 Wimbledon Championships

Final
- Champion: (France) Jean Borotra
- Runner-up: (United States) Howard Kinsey
- Score: 8–6, 6–1, 6–3

Details
- Draw: 128 (7Q)
- Seeds: –

Events
Singles	men	women		boys	girls
Doubles	men	women	mixed	boys	girls
- Wimbledon Championships

Jean Borotra defeated Howard Kinsey 8–6, 6–1, 6–3 in the final on July 2, 1926 to win the gentlemen's singles tennis title at Wimbledon. René Lacoste was the defending champion, but withdrew before his first round match.

== Draw ==
Key

- Q = Qualifier
- WC = Wild card
- LL = Lucky loser
- Alt = Alternate
- ITF = ITF entry
- PR = Protected ranking
- SR = Special ranking
- SE = Special exempt
- JE = Junior exempt
- JR = Junior Accelerator Programme entrant
- CO = College Accelerator Programme entrant
- NG = Next Gen Accelerator Program entrant
- w/o = Walkover
- r = Retired
- d = Defaulted

=== Finals ===
Quarterfinals
(France) Jacques Brugnon	6	4	6	4	6
(United Kingdom) Charles Kingsley	2	6	2	6	4
(United States) Howard Kinsey	6	6	3	6
(South Africa) Pat Spence	3	3	6	3
(France) Henri Cochet	6	6	4	6
(United Kingdom) Colin Gregory	4	2	6	3
(Czechoslovakia) Jan Koželuh	4	6	7	1
(France) Jean Borotra	6	4	9	6

Semifinals
(France) Jacques Brugnon	4	6	3	6	7
(United States) Howard Kinsey	6	4	6	3	9
(France) Henri Cochet	6	5	6	3	5
(France) Jean Borotra	2	7	2	6	7

Final
(United States) Howard Kinsey	6	1	3
(France) Jean Borotra	8	6	6

=== Top half ===
==== Section 1 ====
First round
(Czechoslovakia) Ladislav Žemla	1	7	6	6
(United Kingdom) Norman Latchford	6	5	2	2
(United Kingdom) Norman Dicks	6	6	6
Q	(United Kingdom) Jack Weakley	4	0	4
(Romania) Nicolae Mișu	6	4	2	1
(France) Jacques Brugnon	4	6	6	6
(United Kingdom) Douglas Hodges	6	6	6
(India) Sandford Bobb	4	2	4
(Austria) Franz Glanz	1	2	4
(United Kingdom) Randolph Lycett	6	6	6
(New Zealand) JF Park
(Canada) William Foley	w/o
(Australia) Eric Lloyd Jones	0	6	6	0
(United Kingdom) WHM Aitken	6	1	8	6
(France) René Lacoste	w/o
(Netherlands) Gerard Leembruggen

Second round
(Czechoslovakia) L Žemla	2	6	6	2
(United Kingdom) N Dicks	6	3	3	0^{r}
(France) J Brugnon	7	6	6
(United Kingdom) D Hodges	5	2	2
(United Kingdom) R Lycett	6	6	6
(New Zealand) JF Park	1	1	0
(United Kingdom) WHM Aitken	6	5	6	6
(Netherlands) G Leembruggen	1	7	4	0

Third round
(Czechoslovakia) L Žemla	3	0	2
(France) J Brugnon	6	6	6
(United Kingdom) R Lycett	6	6	7
(United Kingdom) WHM Aitken	3	1	5

Fourth round
(France) J Brugnon	6	6	6
(United Kingdom) R Lycett	4	1	3

==== Section 2 ====
First round
(Argentina) Guillermo Robson	2	6	2	4
(United Kingdom) Charles Kingsley	6	1	6	6
(Switzerland) Hector Fisher	7	1	7	6
(United Kingdom) Douglas Watson	5	6	5	4
(France) Max Decugis	2	6	8	1	7
(United Kingdom) Leighton Crawford	6	4	6	6	5
(New Zealand) Russell Young	2	3	1
(United Kingdom) George Greville	6	6	6
(United Kingdom) JE Pogson-Smith	2	1	3
(Canada) Henry Mayes	6	6	6
(United States) Donald Stralem	2	2	1
(Netherlands) Hendrik Timmer	6	6	6
(New Zealand) James Lowry	5	1	2
(Switzerland) Charles Aeschlimann	7	6	6
(United Kingdom) Fassett Burnett	6	8	6
(United Kingdom) Tony Crossley	2	6	3

Second round
(United Kingdom) C Kingsley	11	6	6
(Switzerland) H Fisher	9	2	2
(France) M Decugis	6	7	4	6
(United Kingdom) G Greville	3	5	6	4
(Canada) H Mayes	3	6	4	7	6
(Netherlands) H Timmer	6	4	6	5	3
(Switzerland) C Aeschlimann	4	6	2	6	6
(United Kingdom) F Burnett	6	3	6	4	1

Third round
(United Kingdom) C Kingsley	6	6	9
(France) M Decugis	2	2	7
(Canada) H Mayes	2	5	6	6	6
(Switzerland) C Aeschlimann	6	7	1	1	4

Fourth round
(United Kingdom) C Kingsley	6	1	6	2	6
(Canada) H Mayes	2	6	1	6	3

==== Section 3 ====
First round
(India) Athar-Ali Fyzee	6	4	6	6
(Dutch East Indies) EL Sarkies	3	6	2	3
(United Kingdom) Theodore Mavrogordato	6	3	3	6	6
(United Kingdom) Eric Peters	4	6	6	2	8
(Netherlands) Cornelis Bryan
(Austria) Ludwig von Salm-Hoogstraeten	w/o
(United Kingdom) Royden Dash	4	6	6	7
(United Kingdom) CL Philcox	6	2	0	5
(United Kingdom) Craig Campbell	5	6	6	3	2
(United Kingdom) Brian Gilbert	7	2	4	6	6
(United Kingdom) Charles Dixon	2	1	1
(United States) Howard Kinsey	6	6	6
(Spain) Eduardo Flaquer	8	6	3	7
(United States) Jack Olmsted	6	4	6	5
(United Kingdom) Walter Crawley	6	6	6
(United Kingdom) Maurice Summerson	2	2	3

Second round
(India) AA Fyzee	6	3	6	6
(United Kingdom) E Peters	3	6	3	1
(Netherlands) C Bryan	2	6	6	5	6
(United Kingdom) R Dash	6	1	3	7	4
(United Kingdom) B Gilbert	1	1	4
(United States) H Kinsey	6	6	6
(Spain) E Flaquer	2	9	9	7
(United Kingdom) W Crawley	6	7	7	5

Third round
(India) AA Fyzee	8	4	1	4
(Netherlands) C Bryan	6	6	6	6
(United States) H Kinsey	6	6	4	3	6
(Spain) E Flaquer	2	2	6	6	1

Fourth round
(Netherlands) C Bryan	4	2	4
(United States) H Kinsey	6	6	6

==== Section 4 ====
First round
(United Kingdom) Major Ritchie	3	4	6	2
(United Kingdom) Nigel Sharpe	6	6	4	6
(Argentina) Francisco Bryans	1	2	1
(United Kingdom) George Cholmondeley	6	6	6
(Republic of Ireland) Edmond Mockler	4	1	5
(Denmark) Axel Petersen	6	6	7
(United Kingdom) RDN Pryce-Jones	5	9	3
(South Africa) Pat Spence	7	11	6
(United Kingdom) Monty Temple	4	2	4
(United Kingdom) Donald Greig	6	6	6
(Argentina) Enrique Obarrio	1	4	4
(United Kingdom) Brian Helmore	6	6	6
(United Kingdom) Gordon Crole-Rees	3	3	2
(United Kingdom) Noel Turnbull	6	6	6
(Hungary) Béla von Kehrling	7	6	2	6
(France) Paul Féret	5	4	6	3

Second round
(United Kingdom) N Sharpe	4	6	6	6
(United Kingdom) G Cholmondeley	6	4	1	3
(Denmark) A Petersen	3	6	6	2	2
(South Africa) P Spence	6	2	2	6	6
(United Kingdom) D Greig	8	6	6
(United Kingdom) B Helmore	6	2	3
(United Kingdom) N Turnbull	6	7	6
(Hungary) B von Kehrling	2	5	3

Third round
(United Kingdom) N Sharpe	6	6	5	3
(South Africa) P Spence	8	3	7	6
(United Kingdom) D Greig	6	3	6	6
(United Kingdom) N Turnbull	4	6	2	0

Fourth round
(South Africa) P Spence	4	5	6	6	6
(United Kingdom) D Greig	6	7	2	3	0

=== Bottom half ===
==== Section 5 ====
First round
(United Kingdom) Alex Blair	6	5	3	1
(United Kingdom) RG Bernard	4	7	6	6
(United Kingdom) Frank Jarvis	8	7	5	1	1
(Netherlands) Maas van der Feen	6	5	7	6	6
Q	(United Kingdom) Arthur Yencken	0	0	0
(United States) Vincent Richards	6	6	6
(United Kingdom) Ambrose Dudley	1	5	3
(France) Henri Cochet	6	7	6
Q	(United Kingdom) Clinton McIlquham	6	7	8	4
(United Kingdom) Keats Lester	8	9	6	6
(Australia) DJR Sumner	3	2	5
(United Kingdom) Teddy Higgs	6	6	7
(United Kingdom) Gordon Lowe	6	6	6
(United Kingdom) Eliot Crawshay-Williams	4	2	2
(United Kingdom) William Powell	5	6	4	6
(Argentina) Ronaldo Boyd	7	3	6	8

Second round
(United Kingdom) RG Bernard	8	8	7	6
(Netherlands) M van der Feen	6	10	5	4
(United States) V Richards	6	3	4	2
(France) H Cochet	4	6	6	6
(United Kingdom) K Lester	6	6	17
(United Kingdom) E Higgs	3	3	15
(United Kingdom) G Lowe	6	6	3	6
(Argentina) R Boyd	2	2	6	3

Third round
(United Kingdom) RG Bernard	1	3	3
(France) H Cochet	6	6	6
(United Kingdom) K Lester	6	6	6
(United Kingdom) G Lowe	3	4	3

Fourth round
(France) H Cochet	6	7	6
(United Kingdom) K Lester	2	5	4

==== Section 6 ====
First round
(United Kingdom) Colin Gregory	6	6	6	6
(United Kingdom) Roy Poland	3	4	8	3
(United Kingdom) Brame Hillyard
(Soviet Union) Sergei Rodzianko	w/o
(Kingdom of Yugoslavia) György Dungyersky	8	3	4	2
(South Africa) Gerald Sherwell	6	6	6	6
(United Kingdom) H Lewis-Philipps	2	3	3
Q	(Republic of Ireland) F Crosbie	6	6	6
Q	(United Kingdom) David Williams	1	1	2
(United Kingdom) Percival Davson	6	6	6
(France) Léonce Aslangul	9	6	4	6
(United Kingdom) Alfred Ingram	7	4	6	2
(United Kingdom) Patrick Wheatley	6	6	6
(United Kingdom) Cecil Tindell-Green	4	1	2
(United Kingdom) Harvey Mackintosh	2	6	1	6	6
(Austria) Paul Brick	6	2	6	3	2

Second round
(United Kingdom) C Gregory	8	6	6
(United Kingdom) B Hillyard	6	2	2
(South Africa) G Sherwell	6	6	6
Q	(Republic of Ireland) F Crosbie	4	0	1
(United Kingdom) P Davson	6	6	4	6
(France) L Aslangul	2	1	6	4
(United Kingdom) P Wheatley	6	6	5	6
(United Kingdom) H Mackintosh	3	1	7	1

Third round
(United Kingdom) C Gregory	6	4	3	6	7
(South Africa) G Sherwell	0	6	6	4	5
(United Kingdom) P Davson	6	4	7	0	3
(United Kingdom) P Wheatley	1	6	5	6	6

Fourth round
(United Kingdom) C Gregory	6	4	6	5	6
(United Kingdom) P Wheatley	4	6	2	7	1

==== Section 7 ====
First round
(United Kingdom) Douglas Powell	6	3	0	3
(France) André Gobert	2	6	6	6
(United Kingdom) Arthur Berger	0	5	3
(Netherlands) Christiaan van Lennep	6	7	6
(United Kingdom) JCF Simpson	6	4	3	1
(United Kingdom) Cyril Eames	4	6	6	6
(United Kingdom) Basil Lawrence	1	0	5
(United Kingdom) Bunny Austin	6	6	7
(United Kingdom) Henry Standring	6	6	6
Q	(United Kingdom) Neville Willford	1	3	2
(Czechoslovakia) Jan Koželuh	6	6	6
(United Kingdom) George Thomas	0	2	2
(United Kingdom) Lionel Alderson
(United Kingdom) John Pennycuick	w/o
(United Kingdom) Charles Roupell	6	6	2	4	6
(United Kingdom) WB Stott	4	0	6	6	3

Second round
(France) A Gobert	6	5	5	6
(Netherlands) C van Lennep	2	7	7	8
(United Kingdom) C Eames	7	4	0	1^{r}
(United Kingdom) H Austin	5	6	6	4
(United Kingdom) H Standring	6	2	3	2
(Czechoslovakia) J Koželuh	4	6	6	6
(United Kingdom) J Pennycuick	6	9	4	6
(United Kingdom) C Roupell	3	7	6	2

Third round
(Netherlands) C van Lennep	0	6	4	1
(United Kingdom) H Austin	6	4	6	6
(Czechoslovakia) J Koželuh	6	6	6
(United Kingdom) J Pennycuick	1	1	3

Fourth round
(United Kingdom) H Austin	6	0	1	3
(Czechoslovakia) J Koželuh	2	6	6	6

==== Section 8 ====
First round
(France) Jean Borotra	6	6	6
(United Kingdom) Leslie Godfree	3	4	4
(India) Hassan Ali Fyzee	7	6	2	6
(United Kingdom) Pat Hughes	5	2	6	4
(Belgium) Georges Watson	2	2	1
(United Kingdom) Arthur Lowe	6	6	6
(United Kingdom) VS Erskine Lindop	6	6	6
(Portugal) Rodrigo de Castro Pereira	3	3	2
(Greece) Pan Papadopoulos
Q	(United Kingdom) LF Davin	w/o
(Canada) David Morrice	6	4	1	4
(Denmark) Einer Ulrich	4	6	6	6
(Argentina) Hector Cattaruzza	6	6	9
(New Zealand) Frank Fisher	2	0	7
(Mexico) Ignacio de la Borbolla	6	5	6
(United Kingdom) William Radcliffe	8	7	8

Second round
(France) J Borotra	3	6	7	6
(India) HA Fyzee	6	4	5	4
(United Kingdom) A Lowe	6	6	6
(United Kingdom) VS Erskine Lindop	1	1	2
Q	(United Kingdom) LF Davin	5	6	6	4
(Denmark) E Ulrich	7	8	3	6
(Argentina) H Cattaruzza	4	6	4	6	6
(United Kingdom) W Radcliffe	6	3	6	1	2

Third round
(France) J Borotra	6	6	7
(United Kingdom) A Lowe	3	4	5
(Denmark) E Ulrich	7	6	8
(Argentina) H Cattaruzza	5	1	6

Fourth round
(France) J Borotra	6	2	6	7
(Denmark) E Ulrich	1	6	4	5

Preceded by 1926 French Championships	Grand Slams; Men's Singles	Succeeded by 1926 U.S. Championships
