= 1929 Wimbledon Championships – Men's doubles =

Men's doubles
- 1929 Wimbledon Championships

Final
- Champions: (United States) Wilmer Allison (United States) John Van Ryn
- Runners-up: (United Kingdom) Ian Collins (United Kingdom) Colin Gregory
- Score: 6–4, 5–7, 6–3, 10–12, 6–4

Details
- Draw: 64 (5Q)
- Seeds: 4

Events
Singles	men	women		boys	girls
Doubles	men	women	mixed	boys	girls
- Wimbledon Championships

Jacques Brugnon and Henri Cochet were the defending champions, but lost in the quarterfinals to Wilmer Allison and John Van Ryn.

Allison and Van Ryn defeated Ian Collins and Colin Gregory in the final, 6–4, 5–7, 6–3, 10–12, 6–4 to win the gentlemen's doubles tennis title at the 1929 Wimbledon Championship.

== Seeds ==
1. (France) Jacques Brugnon / (France) Henri Cochet (quarterfinals)
2. (United States) John Hennessey / (United States) George Lott (semifinals)
3. (United States) Frank Hunter / (United States) Bill Tilden (semifinals)
4. (United Kingdom) Ian Collins / (United Kingdom) Colin Gregory (final)

Click on the seed number of a player to go to their draw section.

== Draw ==
Key

- Q = Qualifier
- WC = Wild card
- LL = Lucky loser
- Alt = Alternate
- ITF = ITF entry
- PR = Protected ranking
- SR = Special ranking
- SE = Special exempt
- JE = Junior exempt
- JR = Junior Accelerator Programme entrant
- CO = College Accelerator Programme entrant
- NG = Next Gen Accelerator Program entrant
- w/o = Walkover
- r = Retired
- d = Defaulted

=== Finals ===
Quarterfinals
2	(United States) John Hennessey (United States) George Lott	6	11	5	6
(United Kingdom) Charles Kingsley (United Kingdom) John Olliff	3	9	7	2
4	(United Kingdom) Ian Collins (United Kingdom) Colin Gregory	5	4	6	6	6
(France) Jean Borotra (France) Christian Boussus	7	6	1	2	2
1	(France) Jacques Brugnon (France) Henri Cochet	5	6	6	6
(United States) Wilmer Allison (United States) John Van Ryn	7	8	3	8
3	(United States) Frank Hunter (United States) Bill Tilden	6	8	6
(Hungary) Béla von Kehrling (Germany) Heinrich Kleinschroth	4	6	1

Semifinals
2	(United States) John Hennessey (United States) George Lott	6	5	1	6	5
4	(United Kingdom) Ian Collins (United Kingdom) Colin Gregory	4	7	6	4	7
(United States) Wilmer Allison (United States) John Van Ryn	6	12	6
3	(United States) Frank Hunter (United States) Bill Tilden	3	10	3

Final
4	(United Kingdom) Ian Collins (United Kingdom) Colin Gregory	4	7	3	12	4
(United States) Wilmer Allison (United States) John Van Ryn	6	5	6	10	6

=== Top half ===
==== Section 1 ====
First round
2	(United States) John Hennessey (United States) George Lott	6	6	6
(Hungary) Pál Leiner (Hungary) Imre Takáts	2	1	1
(Germany) Fritz Kuhlmann (Germany) Eberhard Nourney	9	4	6	6
(United Kingdom) Harry Lee (United Kingdom) Will Legg	7	6	1	2
(United Kingdom) Randolph Lycett (United Kingdom) Patrick Wheatley	6	6	6
(Austria) Franz Matejka (Austria) Ludwig von Salm-Hoogstraeten	2	2	2
(Germany) Hans Moldenhauer (Germany) Daniel Prenn	6	8	6	3	6
(United Kingdom) Jack Chamberlain (United Kingdom) Jack Harrison	4	10	3	6	2
(United Kingdom) Charles Kingsley (United Kingdom) John Olliff	6	6	6
(Sweden) Curt Östberg (Sweden) Harry Ramberg	0	3	3
Q	(United States) Jimmy Van Alen (United States) William Van Alen	6	6	6
(United Kingdom) Stan Harris (Romania) Nicolae Mișu	3	4	3
(India) Janmeja Charanjiva (India) Syed Mohammad Hadi	7	6	8	7
(United Kingdom) Laddie Wheatcroft (United Kingdom) Ulysses Williams	5	4	10	5
(United Kingdom) JH Frowen (United Kingdom) William Powell	4	5	6
(United Kingdom) Arthur Lowe (South Africa) Gerald Sherwell	6	7	8

Second round
2	(United States) J Hennessey (United States) G Lott	6	9	7	6
(Germany) F Kuhlmann (Germany) E Nourney	1	7	9	2
(United Kingdom) R Lycett (United Kingdom) P Wheatley	6	7	6
(Germany) H Moldenhauer (Germany) D Prenn	4	5	1
(United Kingdom) C Kingsley (United Kingdom) J Olliff	6	6	6
Q	(United States) J Van Alen (United States) W Van Alen	1	2	4
(India) J Charanjiva (India) SM Hadi	6	6	5	6
(United Kingdom) A Lowe (South Africa) G Sherwell	2	4	7	2

Third round
2	(United States) J Hennessey (United States) G Lott	6	6	6
(United Kingdom) R Lycett (United Kingdom) P Wheatley	2	3	1
(United Kingdom) C Kingsley (United Kingdom) J Olliff	6	1	6	6
(India) J Charanjiva (India) SM Hadi	1	6	1	4

Quarterfinals
2	(United States) J Hennessey (United States) G Lott	6	11	5	6
(United Kingdom) C Kingsley (United Kingdom) J Olliff	3	9	7	2

==== Section 2 ====
First round
4	(United Kingdom) Ian Collins (United Kingdom) Colin Gregory	6	3	5	6	9
(France) Antoine Gentien (France) Georges Glasser	2	6	7	4	7
Q	(United Kingdom) MHB Eddowes (United Kingdom) Eric Hollins	2	4	6	1
(South Africa) Norman Farquharson (South Africa) Louis Raymond	6	6	3	6
(United Kingdom) Pat Hughes (Canada) Charles Leslie	6	7	6
(United Kingdom) Douglas Powell (United Kingdom) Nigel Sharpe	2	5	3
(Republic of Ireland) Shirley Dillon (Republic of Ireland) Edward McGuire	5	4	6	6	6
(France) Emmanuel du Plaix (France) Raymond Rodel	7	6	3	4	2
(Canada) Willard Crocker (South Africa) DA Wright	6	6	9
(United Kingdom) GR Ashton (United Kingdom) Leighton Crawford	3	2	7
(France) Jean Borotra (France) Christian Boussus	6	7	6
(United Kingdom) Billy Collins (United Kingdom) Harvey Mackintosh	4	5	3
(Italy) Roberto Bocciardo (Italy) Leonardo Bonzi	5	8	0	4
(United Kingdom) Victor Cazalet (United Kingdom) John Cecil Masterman	7	6	6	6
(Republic of Ireland) Cecil Campbell (United Kingdom) Eliot Crawshay-Williams	6	3	6	4
(Belgium) Léopold de Borman (Belgium) André Lacroix	4	6	8	6

Second round
4	(United Kingdom) I Collins (United Kingdom) C Gregory	1	1	8	8	6
(South Africa) N Farquharson (South Africa) L Raymond	6	6	6	6	0
(United Kingdom) P Hughes (Canada) C Leslie	6	6	7
(Republic of Ireland) S Dillon (Republic of Ireland) E McGuire	1	2	5
(Canada) W Crocker (South Africa) DA Wright	1	3	15
(France) J Borotra (France) C Boussus	6	6	17
(United Kingdom) V Cazalet (United Kingdom) JC Masterman	6	7	9	5	6
(Belgium) L de Borman (Belgium) A Lacroix	2	5	11	7	4

Third round
4	(United Kingdom) I Collins (United Kingdom) C Gregory	6	6	8
(United Kingdom) P Hughes (Canada) C Leslie	4	1	6
(France) J Borotra (France) C Boussus	6	6	6
(United Kingdom) V Cazalet (United Kingdom) JC Masterman	2	1	1

Quarterfinals
4	(United Kingdom) I Collins (United Kingdom) C Gregory	5	4	6	6	6
(France) J Borotra (France) C Boussus	7	6	1	2	2

=== Bottom half ===
==== Section 3 ====
First round
1	(France) Jacques Brugnon (France) Henri Cochet	6	7	7
(United Kingdom) Norman Latchford (United Kingdom) David Williams	3	5	5
(Czechoslovakia) Roderich Menzel (Denmark) Einer Ulrich	2	4	6	6	11
(United Kingdom) Alfred Ingram (United Kingdom) William Radcliffe	6	6	4	0	9
(Spain) Enrique Maier (Spain) Francisco Sindreu	w/o
(Japan) Ryuki Miki (Japan) Yoshiro Ohta
(United Kingdom) Sidney Hepburn (United Kingdom) Tim Horn	4	4	8	6	6
Q	(United Kingdom) GA Barber (United Kingdom) CH Watson	6	6	6	3	2
(United States) Wilbur Coen (Netherlands) Hendrik Timmer	7	6	6
(Italy) Alberto del Bono (Italy) Uberto de Morpurgo	5	4	1
(New Zealand) Buster Andrews (Czechoslovakia) Jan Koželuh	7	3	6	6
Q	(United Kingdom) Kenneth Gandar-Dower (United Kingdom) Ivor Maddock	5	6	3	3
(United Kingdom) Brame Hillyard (United Kingdom) Jack Hillyard	2	4	7	6
(Germany) Walter Dessart (Germany) Friedrich Frenz	6	6	5	8
(United States) Wilmer Allison (United States) John Van Ryn
(Egypt) Rene Danon (Egypt) Jacques Grandguillot	w/o

Second round
1	(France) J Brugnon (France) H Cochet	6	7	6
(Czechoslovakia) R Menzel (Denmark) E Ulrich	4	5	4
(Japan) T Miki (Japan) Y Ohta	5	3	5
(United Kingdom) S Hepburn (United Kingdom) T Horn	7	6	7
(United States) W Coen (Netherlands) H Timmer	5	3	6	2
(New Zealand) E Andrews (Czechoslovakia) J Koželuh	7	6	3	6
(Germany) W Dessart (Germany) F Frenz	3	4	4
(United States) W Allison (United States) J Van Ryn	6	6	6

Third round
1	(France) J Brugnon (France) H Cochet	6	10	6
(United Kingdom) S Hepburn (United Kingdom) T Horn	1	8	1
(New Zealand) E Andrews (Czechoslovakia) J Koželuh	2	4	2
(United States) W Allison (United States) J Van Ryn	6	6	6

Quarterfinals
1	(France) J Brugnon (France) H Cochet	5	6	6	6
(United States) W Allison (United States) J Van Ryn	7	8	3	8

==== Section 4 ====
First round
3	(United States) Frank Hunter (United States) Bill Tilden	6	6	4	3	6
(South Africa) Roy Malcolm (South Africa) Colin Robbins	2	2	6	6	0
(United Kingdom) Brian Gilbert (United Kingdom) Noel Turnbull	6	4	6	6	8
(United States) R Covington (Germany) Karl Wetzel	1	6	0	8	6
(United Kingdom) Keats Lester (United Kingdom) Eric Peters	4	4	1
(United Kingdom) Gordon Crole-Rees (United Kingdom) Cyril Eames	6	6	6
(United Kingdom) Donald Greig (United Kingdom) Brian Helmore	6	6	6	7
(United Kingdom) Claude Metcalf (United Kingdom) Arthur Vinall	8	4	2	5
(United Kingdom) Edward Dearman (United Kingdom) Lewis Michell	6	6	6	7
(United Kingdom) Alan Brown (United Kingdom) CL Philcox	3	8	4	5
(France) René de Buzelet (France) Pierre Henri Landry
Q	(United Kingdom) Fred Perry (United Kingdom) Frank Wilde	w/o
(United Kingdom) Guy Cooper (United States) Bill Lingelbach	6	6	7
(Republic of Ireland) Noel Holmes (United Kingdom) FR Price	2	2	5
(Hungary) Béla von Kehrling (Germany) Heinrich Kleinschroth	6	6	6
(United Kingdom) Herman David (United Kingdom) Ken Horne	0	0	2

Second round
3	(United States) F Hunter (United States) W Tilden	6	6	6
(United Kingdom) B Gilbert (United Kingdom) N Turnbull	3	2	4
(United Kingdom) G Crole-Rees (United Kingdom) C Eames	6	6	3	6
(United Kingdom) D Greig (United Kingdom) B Helmore	4	4	6	2
(United Kingdom) E Dearman (United Kingdom) L Michell	2	4	6	4
(France) R de Buzelet (France) PH Landry	6	6	2	6
(United Kingdom) G Cooper (United States) W Lingelbach	7	1	3	3
(Hungary) B von Kehrling (Germany) H Kleinschroth	5	6	6	6

Third round
3	(United States) F Hunter (United States) W Tilden	6	6	6
(United Kingdom) G Crole-Rees (United Kingdom) C Eames	1	4	3
(France) R de Buzelet (France) PH Landry	6	6	2	2	3
(Hungary) B von Kehrling (Germany) H Kleinschroth	4	2	6	6	6

Quarterfinals
3	(United States) F Hunter (United States) W Tilden	6	8	6
(Hungary) B von Kehrling (Germany) H Kleinschroth	4	6	1
