= Bryans =

Bryans is a surname shared by several notable people, among them being:

- Anne Bryans, deceased British Red Cross staffer
- Bebe Bryans, living American athlete
- Billy Bryans, deceased Canadian musician
- Frank Bryans, deceased Argentine cricketer and tennis player
- John Bryans, deceased British actor
- Lina Bryans, deceased Australian artist
- Lynda Bryans, living Northern Irish television news personality
- Matt Bryans, living British artist
- Ralph Bryans, deceased Northern Irish motorcycle racer
- Robin Bryans, deceased Irish author
