= Frank Bryans =

Argentine cricketer and tennis player

Personal information
- Full name: Francisco Alfred Bryans
- Born: 3 July 1901; Argentina
- Died: 15 December 1963 (aged 62); Buenos Aires, Argentina
- Batting: Unknown
- Bowling: Unknown

Career statistics
Competition	First-class
Matches	9
Runs scored	240
Batting average	16.00
100s/50s	–/1
Top score	65
Balls bowled	831
Wickets	18
Bowling average	23.33
5 wickets in innings	1
10 wickets in match	–
Best bowling	5/67
Catches/stumpings	3/–
- Source: Cricinfo, 27 July 2019

Francisco Alfred 'Frank' Bryans (3 July 1901 – 15 December 1963) was an Argentine first-class cricketer and tennis player.

Byrans made his debut in first-class cricket for Argentina against the Marylebone Cricket Club (MCC) at Buenos Aires in December 1926. He played three further first-class matches against the touring MCC in January 1927. His next appearances in first-class cricket came for Argentina against the touring Sir J Cahn's XI in March 1930, with Bryans making three appearances. In seven first-class matches for Argentina, he scored 186 runs at an average of 16.90 and a high score of 65. With the ball, he took 13 wickets at a bowling average of 23.07, with best figures of 5 for 67. He later played two first-class matches for H. D. G. Leveson Gower's XI in 1933 at Eastbourne, playing against Oxford University and Cambridge University. He scored 54 runs in these two matches and took 5 wickets.

As a tennis player, Bryans twice took part in Wimbledon. In the 1926 Men's Singles he was defeated in the first-round by George Cholmondeley, while in the 1933 Men's Singles he was again defeated in the first-round, this time by Alan Brown. Bryans served as the president of the Argentine Cricket Association from 1956–60. He died at Buenos Aires in December 1963.
