= Matt Bryans =

British artist (born 1977)

Matt Bryans (born 1977) is an artist based in London. Bryans has exhibited at Tate Modern in the exhibition Untitled (2005), with Amie Dicke, Godfried Donkor, Dr Lakra, Wangechi Mutu, Jockum Nordström, Stephen Shearer and Nicole Wermers. He erases colour photographs from magazines, leaving behind smudged and smeared newsprint. Such collections of masked news stories covered the walls of galleries in immersive installations.

Examples of Bryans work have been acquired by several important public art collections, including the Museum of Contemporary Art, Los Angeles and Tate Modern, London.

== Exhibitions ==
- 2008 Matt Bryans, Kate MacGarry, London
- 2007 Matt Bryans, Martin van Zomeren, Amsterdam
- 2006 Matt Bryans, Atlanta Center of Contemporary Art, USA
- 2006 Matt Bryans, Kate MacGarry, London
- 2005 Picture This!, MMD Museum Dhondt-Dhaenens, Deurle, Belgium
- 2005 Matt Bryans, Salon 94, New York
- 2005 Matt Bryans - Landscapes, Martin van Zomeren, Amsterdam
- 2003 Matt Bryans, Kate MacGarry, London
