= Ernst Gottlieb =

Czech tennis player (1893–1980)

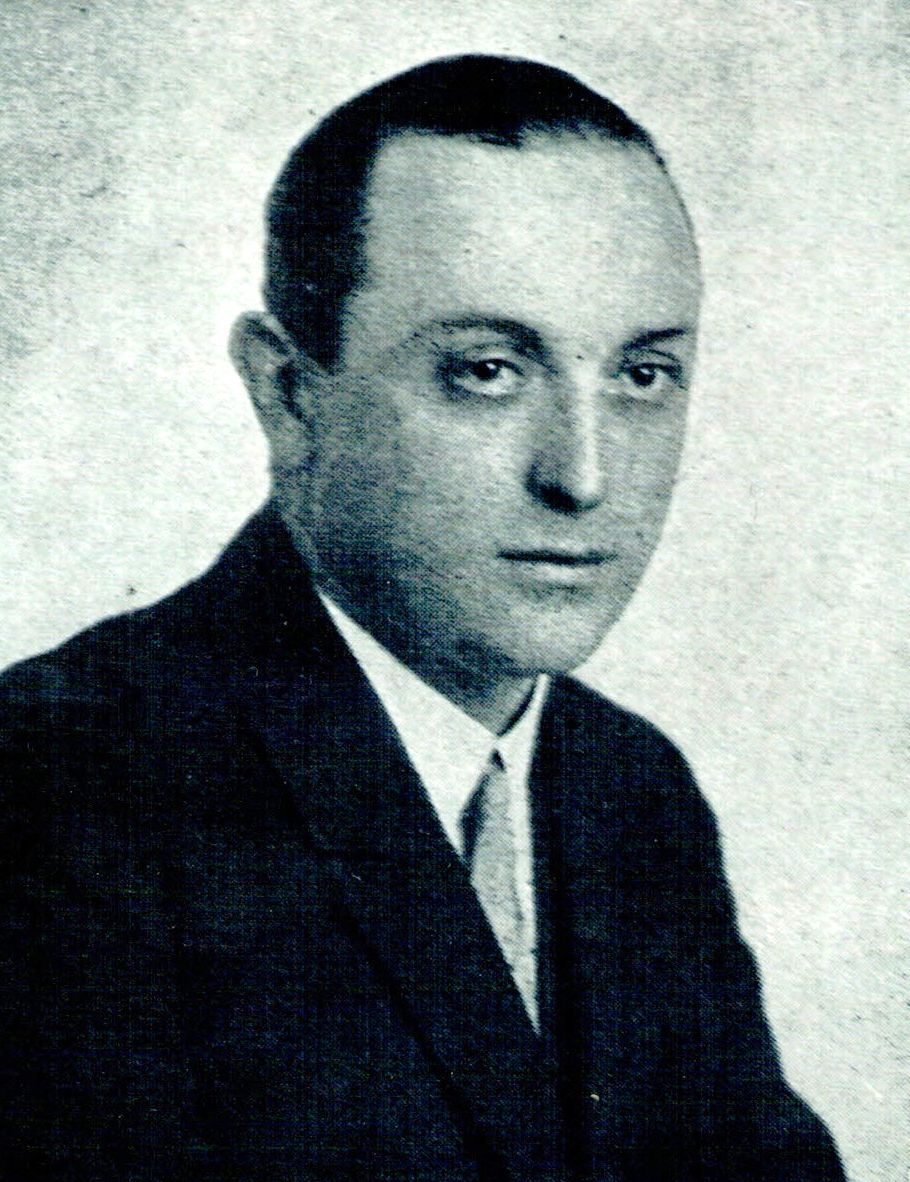

Personal information
- Nationality: Czech
- Born: 18 March 1893; Brno, Austria-Hungary
- Died: 10 April 1980 (aged 87); São Paulo, Brazil

Sport
- Sport: Tennis

Ernst "Arnošt" Gottlieb (18 March 1893 – 10 April 1980) was a Czechoslovak tennis player. He competed in the men's doubles event at the 1924 Summer Olympics.

Gottlieb was born into a German-speaking Jewish family in Brno. His father Ignaz Gottlieb was a kitchenware factory owner.

In August 1914 he was mobilized to the Austro-Hungarian Army, and served on the Eastern Front of World War I. In summer 1917 he was taken a prisoner of war, and eventually joined the Czechoslovak Legions formed in Russia. After the war her returned to his native Brno, where he worked in a rubber manufacturing company as a buyer.

Gottlieb was a registered player of the German Lawn Tennis Club in Brno, specializing in doubles. Together with Friedrich Rohrer, he became a vice-champion on Czechoslovakia in doubles in 1924. Both players represented Czechoslovakia at the 1924 Summer Olympics. They won the Czechoslovak championships a year later in 1925. In 1926 they won with Rohrer the Austrian championships. In 1927 Gottlieb represented Czechoslovakia at the Davis Cup. The same year he became the Czechoslovak champion in doubles with Jan Koželuh and mixed doubles with Jozefína Lobkovicová. He was also an avid rower, and held a membership at the German Rowing Club in Brno.

After the outbreak of World War II in 1939, Gottlieb emigrated to France, where he hoped to join the Czechoslovak armed forces in exile. That proved to be not possible, so he decided to move to Brazil where his brother lived. Gottlieb settled in São Paulo and worked as a businessman.
