= Cyril Eames =

British tennis player

- Full name: Cyril Gladstone Eames
- Country (sports): Great Britain
- Born: 20 October 1890
- Died: 1 August 1974 (aged 83)
- Plays: Right-handed

Singles

Grand Slam singles results
- French Open: 2R (1925)
- Wimbledon: 2R (1925, 1926, 1927, 1928)

Doubles

Grand Slam doubles results
- French Open: SF (1925)
- Wimbledon: QF (1926, 1927, 1928)

Grand Slam mixed doubles results
- French Open: 2R (1925)
- Wimbledon: QF (1925)

Cyril Gladstone Eames (20 October 1890 – 1 August 1974) was a British tennis player.

The son of Charles Gladstone Eames who was also a tennis player, he was most active in the 1920s and made the Wimbledon singles second round four times.

It was his doubles partnership with Gordon Crole-Rees that he was most known for. The pair won the British Covered Court Championships, twice made the Wimbledon doubles quarter-finals and were doubles semi-finalists at the 1925 French Championships, where they lost in five sets to Jean Borotra and René Lacoste. They featured together in the 1928 and 1929 International Lawn Tennis Challenge (Davis Cup) campaigns, winning four of their five doubles rubbers. In their only loss, to Italy in the 1928 Europe Zone semi-final, they had held match points

In 1931 he announced his intention to retire from the tour.

== See also ==
- List of Great Britain Davis Cup team representatives
