= Teddy Higgs =

British tennis player

- Full name: Edward Higgs
- Country (sports): Great Britain
- Born: 1901 or 1902
- Died: 27 July 1950 (aged 48) Lemsford, England

Singles

Grand Slam singles results
- Wimbledon: 3R (1927)
- US Open: 1R (1928)

Doubles

Grand Slam doubles results
- Wimbledon: QF (1926, 1927)

Edward Higgs (died 27 July 1950) was a British tennis player.

== Early life and career ==
Higgs grew up Hertfordshire and studied at Haileybury, before competing on the tennis circuit in the 1920s. He won the British Covered Court Championships in 1927, beating Gordon Crole-Rees in the final. His best run at Wimbledon came in 1927 when he was beaten in the third round by Jean Borotra in five sets. He made the Wimbledon men's doubles quarter-finals twice. A Davis Cup player for Great Britain in 1927 and 1928, Higgs won eight singles rubbers and lost four.

== Personal life ==
Higgs was married Enid Joyce Sherring, the daughter of an Indian civil servant, on December 10 1931 at Christ Church, East Sheen. This made him the brother-in-law of Donal Morphy, the founder of Morphy Richards.

Higgs died in 1950 at his Lemsford home, aged 48. At the time of his death he was a member of the British selection committee for the Davis Cup and Wightman Cup.

== See also ==
- List of Great Britain Davis Cup team representatives
