= Charles Kingsley (tennis) =

English tennis player

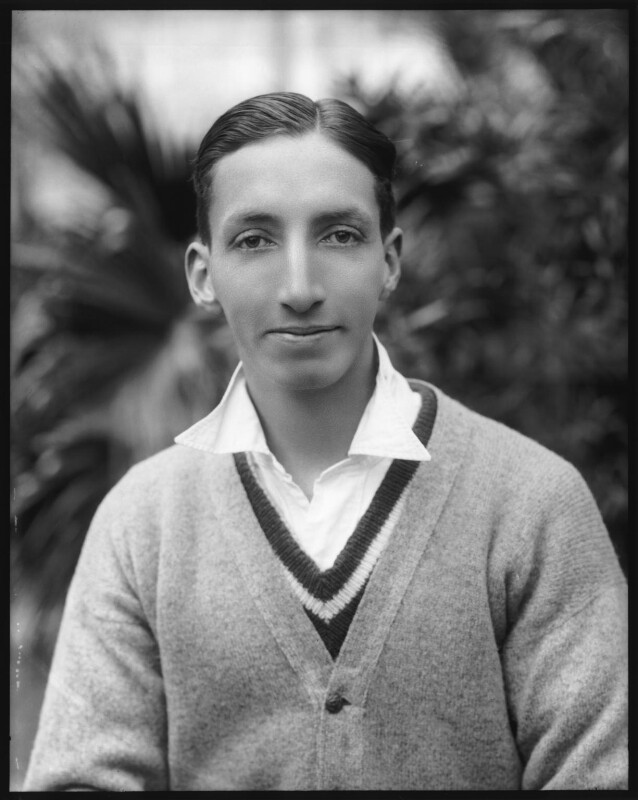
- Kingsley in 1925
- Full name: Charles Herbert Kingsley
- Country (sports): United Kingdom
- Born: 6 March 1899; Moulmein, Burma
- Died: 9 January 1996 (aged 96); Monte Carlo, Monaco

Singles

Grand Slam singles results
- French Open: 3R (1928, 1931)
- Wimbledon: QF (1926)

Doubles

Grand Slam doubles results
- Wimbledon: QF (1924, 1926, 1927, 1929)

Mixed doubles

Grand Slam mixed doubles results
- Wimbledon: SF (1933)

Charles Herbert Kingsley (6 March 1899 – 9 January 1996) was an amateur English tennis player.

Kingsley won the Scottish Championships singles title in 1924 beating G. M. Elliott for the loss of three games. "The winner was much the more versatile player, was quicker in court, placed the more skilfully, and seldom chased a hopeless return." He reached the quarterfinals of Wimbledon (beating Max Decugis before losing to Jacques Brugnon) and the final of Monte Carlo in 1926. Kingsley won the Welsh Championships in 1929 beating William Powell in the final.
