= Keats Lester =

British tennis player

- Full name: Horace Keats Lester
- Country (sports): (United Kingdom) Great Britain
- Born: 4 August 1904
- Died: 16 June 1946 (aged 41) London, England
- Retired: 1934

Grand Slam singles results
- French Open: 4R (1927)
- Wimbledon: 4R (1926, 1930)

Grand Slam doubles results
- Wimbledon: QF (1927, 1932)

Grand Slam mixed doubles results
- Wimbledon: 3R (1926, 1932)

Horace Keats Lester (4 August 1904 – 16 June 1946) was a tennis player from England who competed for Great Britain. He was a pupil at The Leys School, Cambridge.

== Career ==
Lester took part in the Wimbledon Championships every year from 1923 to 1934, for a total of 12 appearances.

He represented Great Britain in the 1926 International Lawn Tennis Challenge. His only match was a dead rubber in Great Britain's Europe Zone semi-final win over Spain in Barcelona, which he lost in straight sets to Raimundo Morales-Marques.

At the 1927 French Championships, Lester was the only seeded British player (12th). He was beaten in the fourth round by Patrick Spence, after having wins over Frenchman Alain Bernard, American Jimmy Van Alen and South African Jack Condon.

== Death ==
Lester was killed on 16 June 1946, when he fell 100 feet from the roof of his block of flats in Chesham Place, Westminster. It was initially reported that he had been sleepwalking but an inquest in July ruled that Lester had committed suicide, while of "unsound mind". He left an estate valued for probate at £24,551.
