= Hector Fisher =

Tennis player and footballer (1901–?)

- Full name: Hector Cosmo Fisher
- Country (sports): Switzerland
- Born: 4 May 1901; Myaungmya, Burma

Singles

Grand Slam singles results
- French Open: 3R (1933, 1936)
- Wimbledon: QF (1925)

Doubles

Grand Slam doubles results
- Wimbledon: QF (1928)

Mixed doubles

Grand Slam mixed doubles results
- Wimbledon: 3R (1933, 1938)

Hector Cosmo Fisher (born 4 May 1901) was an English-Swiss-Thai tennis player and footballer.

== Personal life ==
Fisher was born in Myaungmya, Burma in 1901 and baptised in Bassein, Bengal, British India in August 1902. He was the son of Henry Cosmo-Fisher (1874–1918) and Annie Fisher. His father was an Anglo-Indian born in Bangalore. He had a younger brother, Colin Cosmo-Fisher (1903–1964). He was described as a cosmopolitan "Burmese-Siamese-English-Swiss" athlete.

Fisher attended Oxford University, and played tennis there before he moved to Switzerland.

== Tennis ==
Fisher was above all an excellent tennis player. He represented Switzerland during his tennis career and played in the Davis Cup in the years between 1931 and 1939. Fisher won the Swiss Open in Gstaad four times in 1923, 1928, 1929 and 1931. In 1925 he reached the quarter-finals of Wimbledon. He won the international tennis tournament in Wiesbaden in 1929 and an international tournament in Basel in 1930.

== Football ==
Fisher was also a footballer and played for Montreux-Sports at least during the 1927–28 season.

He also played for FC Basel 1893 in at least one league match in 1930. Fisher joined Basel's first team during their 1930–31 season under Austrian head coach Gustav Putzendopler. He played his first test game for them on 25 October 1930 at home in the Landhof as Basel won 5–1 against La Chaux-de-Fonds. After playing in another test game against Biel-Bienne, Fisher played his domestic league debut for the club in the away game on 30 November 1930 as Basel played a 2–2 draw with local team Old Boys. Fisher was only the second English person to play league football for the club, in fact to date he remains one of only three English players ever to play for Basel, the others being Archibald E. Gough between 1900 and 1902 and L. B. Trenchard Chaffey in 1901.

== Sources ==
- Rotblau: Jahrbuch Saison 2017/2018. Publisher: FC Basel Marketing AG. ISBN 978-3-7245-2189-1
- Die ersten 125 Jahre. Publisher: Josef Zindel im Friedrich Reinhardt Verlag, Basel. ISBN 978-3-7245-2305-5

== Note ==
(NB: The editors of these books and the authors in "Basler Fussballarchiv" have not been able to be able to identify all the players, their date and place of birth or date and place of death, who played in the games during the early years of FC Basel.)
