= Gordon Crole-Rees =

British tennis player

- Country (sports): United Kingdom
- Born: 17 November 1883; Southend-on-Sea, England
- Died: 9 June 1954 (aged 70); Southend, England

Singles

Grand Slam singles results
- French Open: 2R (1925)
- Wimbledon: 3R (1925, 1927)

Doubles

Grand Slam doubles results
- French Open: SF (1925)
- Wimbledon: QF (1926, 1927, 1928)

Grand Slam mixed doubles results
- Wimbledon: SF (1930)

Gordon Rhind Oak Crole-Rees (17 November 1883 – 9 June 1954) was a British tennis player.

== Career ==
Crole-Rees was educated at Highgate School from September 1905 until April 1911.

=== Davis Cup ===
Crole-Rees made his Davis Cup debut in 1925 when he was used by Great Britain for two singles rubbers against France at Devonshire Park. For the rest of Davis Cup career, a further nine ties, he featured only in the doubles. Initially he partnered Charles Kingsley and then he played alongside Cyril Eames.

=== Wimbledon ===
Crole-Rees twice reached the third round at the Wimbledon Championships, but had more success at the tournament as a doubles player. He made the quarter-finals in the men's doubles in three successive years from 1926 to 1928. In the 1927 Wimbledon Championships, en route to the quarter-finals, Crole-Rees and his partner Cyril Eames managed to defeat second seeds Jean Borotra and Rene Lacoste. He made semi-finals in the mixed doubles with Phyllis Mudford at the 1930 Wimbledon Championships.

=== Singles titles ===
- 1925: Surrey Championships
- 1926: Kent Championships
- 1927: Surrey Championships
- 1927: Irish Lawn Tennis Championships

== See also ==
- List of Great Britain Davis Cup team representatives
