= Brian Gilbert (tennis) =

English tennis player

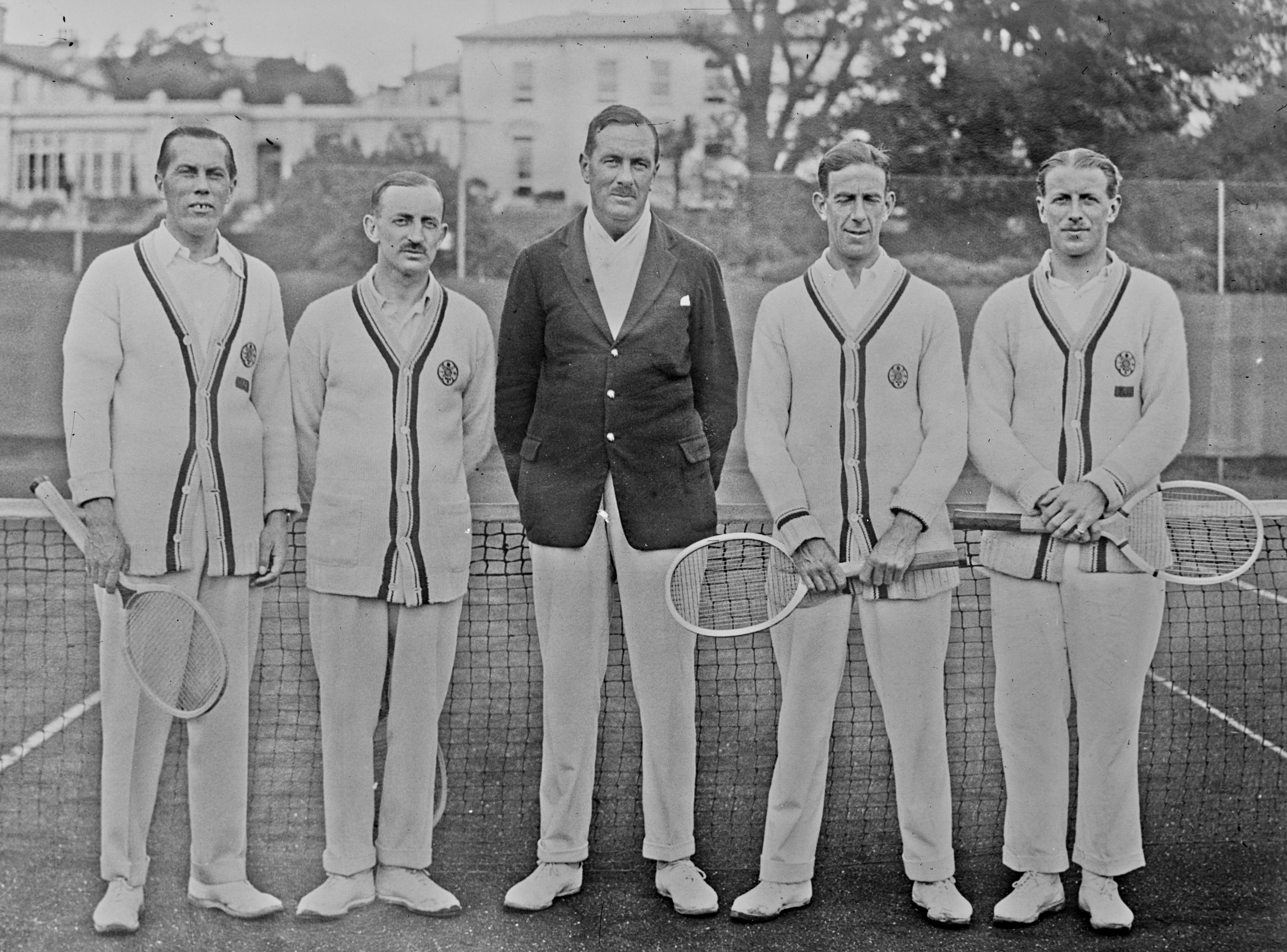
- Brian Gilbert in 1924 (4th from left).
- Full name: John Brian Gilbert
- Country (sports): Great Britain
- Born: 17 July 1887; Barnes, Surrey, England
- Died: 28 July 1974 (aged 87); Roehampton, Surrey, England

Singles

Grand Slam singles results
- Wimbledon: SF (1922)

Other tournaments
- WHCC: 4R (1923)
- WCCC: F (1923)
- Olympic Games: 4R (1924)

Doubles

Grand Slam doubles results
- Wimbledon: 3R (1922, 1924, 1931)

Mixed doubles

Grand Slam mixed doubles results
- Wimbledon: W (1924)

Other mixed doubles tournaments
- WHCC: F (1922, 1923)
- WCCC: F (1923)
- Olympic Games: SF – 4th (1924)

John Brian Gilbert (17 July 1887 – 28 July 1974) was an English men's singles tennis player.

Gilbert competed in the 1924 Summer Olympics and the 1922-1933 Wimbledon Championships. Gilbert reached the semi-finals at Wimbledon in 1922, beating Theodore Mavrogordato before losing to Randolph Lycett.

== Grand Slam finals ==
=== Mixed doubles: (1 title) ===
Result	Year	Championship	Surface	Partner	Opponents	Score
Win	1924	Wimbledon	Grass	(United Kingdom) Kitty McKane	(United Kingdom) Dorothy Shepherd-Barron (United Kingdom) Leslie Godfree	6–3, 3–6, 6–3
