= Match of the Century (tennis) =

1926 tennis match between Suzanne Lenglen and Helen Wills

- (France) Suzanne Lenglen vs. (United States) Helen Wills
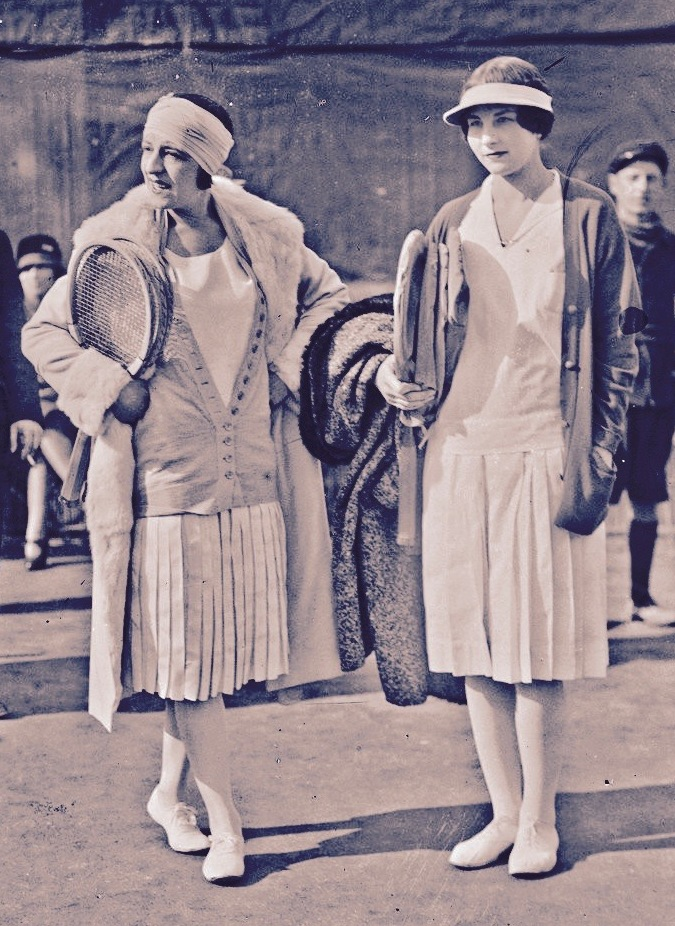
- Lenglen (left) and Wills (right) at the Match of the Century
Set	1	2
(France) Suzanne Lenglen	6	8
(United States) Helen Wills	3	6
- Date: Tuesday, 16 February 1926
- Tournament: Carlton Club (February edition)
- Location: Cannes, France
- Chair umpire: George Hillyard

The Match of the Century was a tennis match on February 16, 1926 known for being the only career meeting between Suzanne Lenglen and Helen Wills, the two preeminent female tennis players of the 1920s. The meeting took place in the final of the February edition of the Carlton Club tournament in Cannes on the French Riviera. Lenglen won the match in straight sets by a score of 6–3, 8–6.

== Background ==
The Match of the Century between Suzanne Lenglen and Helen Wills was contested in the women's singles final of the February edition of the Carlton Club tournament, a middle-tier tournament on the French Riviera circuit. Lenglen and Wills were widely considered to be the two best women's tennis players in the world at the time. They had never faced each other in singles or doubles before this meeting, and had not played against each other in mixed doubles either until a week earlier. Although the Carlton Club tournament itself was not particularly significant, a huge amount of anticipation for a match between Lenglen and Wills had been building up for a few years. While there was particular interest in a match at the French Championships or Wimbledon that June, the press considered it inevitable that they would play at least once if not several times before then on the Riviera circuit once Wills decided to travel to France with the intent of competing on the Riviera, where Lenglen resided and typically began her season. As there were no tournaments that players were required to enter, it was not initially clear where any of the matches would take place. Lenglen, Wills, and some of the leading hotel owners and tennis manufacturers with controlling interests on the Riviera ultimately agreed to set up the first potential meeting at the Carlton Club tournament.

== Competitors ==
=== Suzanne Lenglen ===
Suzanne Lenglen was a 26-year-old French tennis player who was widely acknowledged as the best women's player in the world at the time. She had been ranked No. 1 in the world by A. Wallis Myers in 1925, a position she had held for five consecutive years since the rankings began in 1921. She entered the Carlton Club event on a 163-match win streak, having not lost a singles match in over four years. Lenglen was a six-time Wimbledon champion, then second-most at the time behind Dorothea Lambert Chambers. She had lost just one match in singles and three sets in total since the end of World War I, a period of seven years. Lenglen was rarely challenged in singles, as further evidenced by the lopsided scores with which she won the overwhelming majority of her matches.

The press presented Lenglen with a mythical persona, calling her La Divine (the Goddess) and writing about her as if she were infallible at tennis. The way she was described and regularly highlighted in the press made her immensely popular among tennis fans and drew people to watch her matches who were not otherwise interested in tennis. Her biggest matches often sold out, and potentially upwards of a few thousand fans were unable to purchase seated tickets or gain entry at all. Due to her popularity and high-profile acquaintances, she is recognized as the first female athlete to become an international celebrity outside of her sport.

=== Helen Wills ===
Helen Wills was a 20-year-old American tennis player who was regarded as an up-and-coming star and one of the only players who could potentially defeat Lenglen, if not the only one. She had been ranked No. 2 in the world by A. Wallis Myers after the 1925 season by virtue of having won the U.S. National Championships the previous three years. Her first two such titles came against compatriot Molla Mallory, the only player to defeat Lenglen in singles after World War I. The third title was a victory over British player Kitty McKane, who had previously defeated Wills in the 1924 Wimbledon final.

== Lead-up to the match ==
=== Missed encounters in previous years ===
The hype for a match between Lenglen and Wills began in late 1923 following Wills's first major title at the U.S. National Championships. Their first encounter was expected to take place in 1924 when Wills made her first trip to Europe to compete in the Wightman Cup against Great Britain before partaking in Wimbledon and the Olympics later that summer. However, such a meeting never materialized. In April, Lenglen contracted jaundice in Spain after winning the Barcelona International. This illness prevented her from playing another competitive match until Wimbledon and notably kept her out of the French Championships, where she was the four-time defending champion. Although both Lenglen and Wills entered Wimbledon in late June, Lenglen had not fully recovered. She entered her quarterfinal against her doubles partner Elizabeth Ryan as an overwhelming favorite, having not lost a game in any of her first three matches. Although she defeated Ryan, she dropped the middle set, the first set of tennis she had lost in singles since 1921. Following the match, Lenglen withdrew from the tournament, asserting she had not yet recovered from her illness. She did not play another match that year. In the other half of the draw, Wills reached the final without losing more than two games in any set. Though, she could not capitalize on Lenglen's withdrawal and ultimately finished runner-up to Kitty McKane despite taking the first set. A week later, Wills did take advantage of Lenglen's absence at the 1924 Olympics in Paris, winning the gold medals in both singles and doubles. This Olympic success bolstered her popularity in the United States and helped her rise to a level of stardom comparable to that of Lenglen, adding more interest for a match between tennis's two leading female stars.

Wills did not return to Europe in 1925, instead focusing on her college studies as a sophomore at the University of California at Berkeley in the early part of the year and competing in tournaments on the east coast of the United States during the summer. During that year, Lenglen reestablished that she was unbeatable, going undefeated in both singles and doubles, and winning titles in singles, doubles, and mixed doubles at both the first open French Championships as well as Wimbledon. In the United States, Wills was unable to match Lenglen's level of success. Although she won the U.S. National Championships for the third year in a row, needed three sets to defeat Kitty McKane in the final and lost a singles match in straight sets to Elizabeth Ryan at a lead-up tournament. She also lost the decisive doubles match in the Wightman Cup to the visiting British pair of McKane and Evelyn Colyer. With these lapses, Wills had yet to attain the reputation of unassailability that Lenglen had. As a result, Lenglen was still regarded as the best player of the world and a clear favourite in a potential match against Wills.

=== Early Riviera season ===
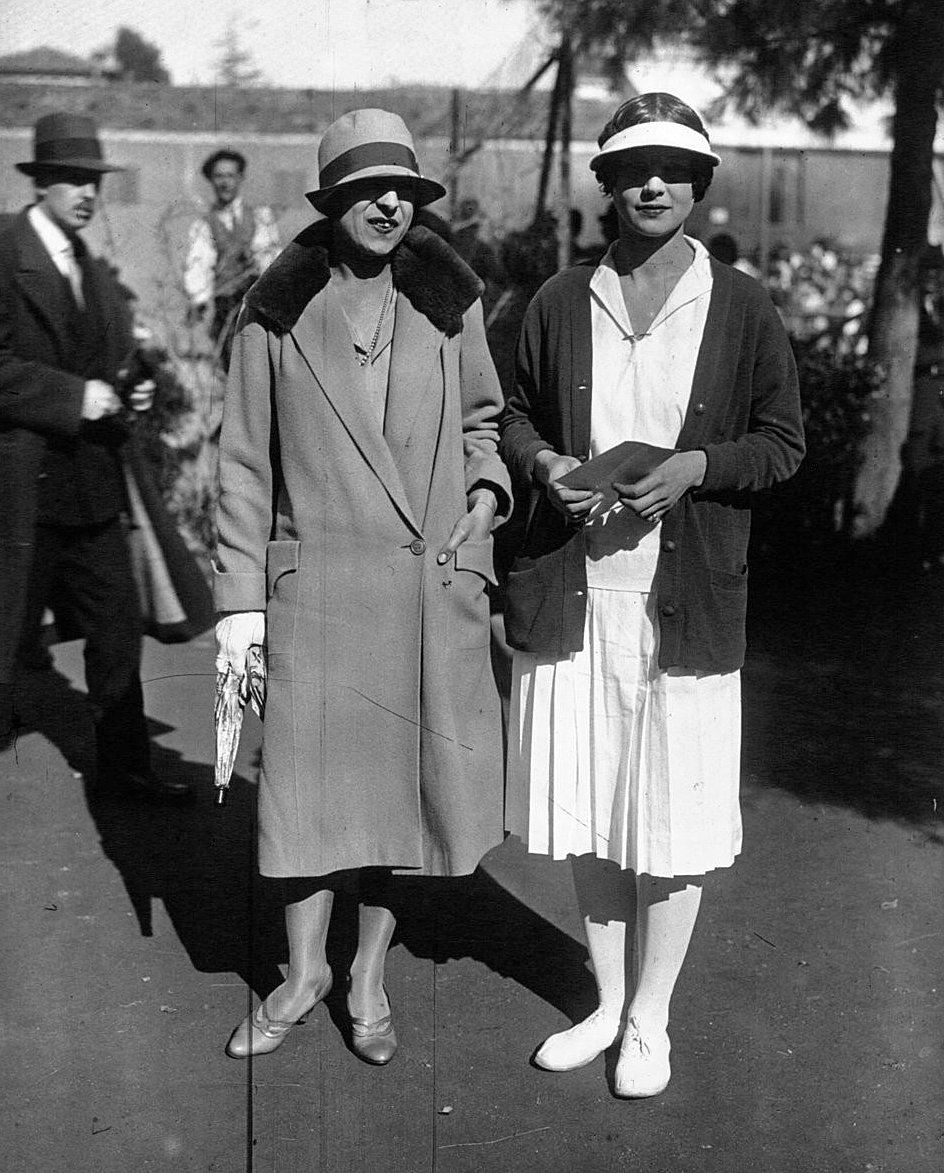
Suzanne Lenglen (left) and Helen Wills Moody on 14 February 1926 in Cannes.

Wills announced in late December 1925 that she was planning to travel to France the next month with one of her goals being to face Lenglen in a tournament on the French Riviera, where Lenglen typically played the majority of her season outside of the Grand Slam tournaments. A keen artist, Wills was adamant that having the opportunity to paint and continue her art studies were part of her underlying motivation for the trip as well. Wills left the United States from New York City with her mother on 6 January and arrived in Le Havre on 15 January, taking a boat train to Paris and then reaching the Riviera on Le Train Bleu the following morning. They were greeted in Paris by over a thousand people, including reporters, officials from the French Tennis Federation (FFT), and a leading French male tennis player Jean Borotra. Pierre Gillou, who was the president of the FFT, and Borotra escorted them to Cannes.

The French Riviera season lasted from late December through April and attracted many of the best players in the world in the lead-up to the French Championships in early June and the Wimbledon Championships in late June, Europe's two Grand Slam tournaments. Despite the Riviera being in France, the players and spectators at these events were predominantly British. Lenglen had already played three tournaments before Wills's arrival. She did not enter the singles events at any of these tournaments, consistent with her usual schedule of only playing doubles and mixed doubles early in the season as she had done in previous years. Wills entered tournaments in all three weeks after she arrived before the Carlton Club tournament. She played at the Metropole Hotel and the Gallia Lawn Tennis Club in Cannes before commuting to Nice to play at the Nice Lawn Tennis Club. Lenglen and Wills avoided meeting at either of the first two tournaments, as Wills only entered singles at the Metropole Hotel while Lenglen only played the doubles and mixed doubles at that tournament and then did not enter the Gallia Club tournament. They could not meet in singles in Nice either as only Lenglen had entered singles; however, they set up their first potential meetings by both entering the doubles and mixed doubles events.

The press expected a singles match between Lenglen and Wills to take place at the Nice Lawn Tennis Club as this was Lenglen's home club. As such, Lenglen had already only entered doubles at the Metropole Hotel and stood by that decision when Wills decided to enter the singles event. She then missed the Gallia Club tournament altogether due to her father's illness. Wills demonstrated that she was in good form at both tournaments, winning both singles events. During this time, she also gained favor in the press and among fans. Her opening match had a record level of attendance for the Riviera. At the Metropole Hotel though, she lost eight games twice in straight set wins against high-ranked players Hélène Contostavlos and Julie Vlasto, opponents Lenglen had routinely defeated in the past while conceding far fewer games. That gap in performance led the press to assert she would not have a chance against Lenglen; however, she partially nullified that assessment by only losing five games to Contostavlos in the Gallia Club final. Meanwhile, Wills lost in the semifinals of the mixed doubles event at the Gallia Club, largely due to the fault of her aged partner George Hillyard.

Contrary to expectation, Lenglen continued to avoid a singles match with Wills in Nice in accordance with leading business interests on the Riviera. When Wills entered the singles event, Lenglen withdrew, which was highly uncharacteristic given that the tournament was at her club. Wills ultimately withdrew from the singles event for an unclear reason, however, prompting Lenglen to reenter. She may have withdrawn because she only needed to commute from Cannes to play the doubles events, which better suited her mother's preference not to relocate to Nice for just one week. She may have also not wanted to face Lenglen at her own club, or to play a singles match against her with the slower type of ball known as a "groover" in use at the tournament. Although they could have met in both doubles and mixed doubles, Lenglen defaulted from the doubles event after the first round because her partner Phyllis Satterthwaite was injured in a car accident. Lenglen and Wills both reached the mixed doubles final, setting up their first encounter. Playing alongside Uberto De Morpurgo, Lenglen defeated Wills and Charles Aeschlimann while only dropping three games and easily nullifying the strategy of Wills and Aeschlimann to keep Lenglen and De Morpurgo at the baseline with repeated lobs. The result was not considered surprising because Wills had not been expected to reach the final with the lower-ranked Aeschlimann as her partner and did not influence expectations for a potential singles encounter.

Key
W	F	SF	QF	#R	RR	Q#	DNQ	A	NH

(W) winner; (F) finalist; (SF) semifinalist; (QF) quarterfinalist; (#R) rounds 4, 3, 2, 1; (RR) round-robin stage; (Q#) qualification round; (DNQ) did not qualify; (A) absent; (NH) not held; (SR) strike rate (events won / competed); (W–L) win–loss record.

Performance timeline from Wills's arrival leading up to the Carlton Club tournament
(France) Suzanne Lenglen			Date	Tournament	(United States) Helen Wills		
Singles	Doubles	Mixed	Date	Tournament	Singles	Doubles	Mixed
A	W	W	18–24 Jan	Metropole Hotel, Cannes	W	A	A
A	A	A	25–31 Jan	Gallia Lawn Tennis Club, Cannes	W	A	SF
W	QF	W	1–7 Feb	Nice Lawn Tennis Club, Nice	A	W	F
5–0	5–0	10–0	Win–loss		11–0	3–0	8–2

Note: Lenglen defaulted in the doubles event at the Nice Lawn Tennis Club.

=== Wills's amateur status ===
During the Riviera season, the French press questioned Wills's amateur status over the issue of Wills agreeing to write a series of articles on her matches for the International News Service (INS). She had obtained sponsorship from the INS instead of the United States Lawn Tennis Association (USLTA) because the USLTA did not want her to travel to Europe until much later that spring to play in an international team competition while representing the United States. The USLTA, however, had an unrelated player-writer rule at the time that forbade players from writing for income about tournaments in which they were playing. In response to the press allegations, the USLTA conducted an investigation of whether Wills violated the rule. At the time of the investigation, Wills had yet to publish any of her writing for the INS. The USLTA ultimately cleared Wills of any wrongdoing on the basis of her statement that she intended to write about aspects of how to play tennis rather than the tournaments themselves. Spectators on the Riviera supported Wills in this matter upon finding out that she was stressed over the possibility of losing her amateur status.

Besides the investigation into Wills's writing, the press also questioned Wills for selling some of her artwork to various newspapers to help finance the trip. Among the works she sold was a sketch of Lenglen for $500. She was able to sell her work for such a high price largely because of her popularity as a tennis player rather than her artistic skill. Nonetheless, Wills was never investigated for these sales because the USLTA did not have a rule against the selling of art and the newspapers were officially making the purchases as art and not news. Because of the initial concerns, Wills also checked with the USLTA over whether the match itself could threaten her amateur status due to the large commercial interest in the event. They verified the business interests were not an issue because the players were not the ones profiting off of the match.

== Tournament ==
=== Selection of the Carlton Club ===
Lenglen and Wills both entered the singles and doubles events at the Carlton Club tournament, setting up their first potential encounter in singles in particular. The Carlton Club was chosen as the location for the match by the leading businessmen on the French Riviera who represented the hotels and tennis-related manufacturers. The hotel representatives were highlighted by the three owners of the Carlton Club, namely John Burke and his sons Albert and Edmund, all of whom were Irish professional tennis players. The tennis businessmen included Francis Fisher and Jacques Brugnon, both of whom were representing the Dunlop Company and were also tennis players themselves.

Lenglen's father, who was also a manager at the Nice Lawn Tennis Club, had wanted the first match to be held at their club. However, the hotel owners and tennis companies were against holding the match in Nice because they expected Lenglen to win the match with ease based on Wills's performance in her first two tournaments. They thought that if Lenglen won too easily, there would be much less to gain financially from a rematch on the Riviera later on. They wanted to delay the match to the Carlton Club the following week to give Wills more time to become accustomed to the conditions and the clay courts on the Riviera with the hope that would make the match more competitive and fuel interest in a rematch. That rematch could potentially take place at the South of France Championships in March, which was hosted by the Nice Lawn Tennis Club and was the largest tournament on the Riviera. In the meantime, another week's delay also amplified interest for the match in the global press and among fans, increasing the opportunity for profit. Fisher and Brugnon made one of the conditions for holding the match at the Carlton Club to be that the tournament use their Dunlop balls, which the Burkes agreed to in spite of objections from some of the club's members. Lenglen was persuaded to abide by these expectations and Wills followed suit, thereby moving the match to the Carlton Club against the wishes of Lenglen's father. The February tournament was one of two editions that the Carlton Club hosted annually, the other taking place in April.

=== Path to the final ===
With 58 competitors entered in the women's singles draw at the February edition of the Carlton Club, the event was played as a standard six-round single-elimination knockout bracket. Lenglen and Wills were intentionally placed on opposite sides of the draw to ensure the only match in which they could meet would be the final. Although they each needed to get through the five rounds to ensure that they meet, it was regarded as a foregone conclusion that they would both reach the final due to the gap in playing ability between them and the other players.

Neither Lenglen, nor Wills lost a game in any of their first three singles matches and both lost just two games in their fourth match. Although the tournament had been scheduled from Monday to Sunday, no matches were played for three days from Tuesday through Thursday due to heavy rain. As Lenglen had a bye in the first round, Wills had an extra match to play against Julie Vlasto in the semifinals. When Vlasto took a 4–1 lead in the second set, she was heavily booed over the possibility of her interfering with a Lenglen–Wills final. Nonetheless, Wills recovered to win the next five games and the match, solidifying a match in the final against Lenglen. During this last set, however, Wills fell in the middle of a rally and suffered a cut on her right knee that was bleeding out. Wills received treatment for the cut after the semifinal and dismissed it as unimportant. She was largely successful in hiding the extent of the injury from the press at the time.

Key: (SF) semifinal; (QF) quarterfinal; (#R) rounds 3, 2, 1

Early rounds of Carlton Club singles event
(France) Suzanne Lenglen		Round	(United States) Helen Wills	
Opponent	Score	Round	Opponent	Score
Bye	N/A	1R	(United Kingdom) Ethel Fischer	6–0, 6–0
(United Kingdom) Winifred Bower	6–0, 6–0	2R	(United Kingdom) Madeline O'Neill	6–0, 6–0
(United Kingdom) Mary Cambridge	6–0, 6–0	3R	(France) Cosette Saint-Omer-Roy	6–0, 6–0
(United Kingdom) Gladys Colston	6–0, 6–0	QF	(United Kingdom) Eileen Bennett	6–2, 6–0
(Greece) Hélène Contostavlos	6–0, 6–2	SF	(France) Julie Vlasto	6–1, 6–4

=== Venue ===
The Carlton Club was not that large, consisting of just six courts. American sportswriter John Tunis described the setting as a "tawdry little excuse for a tennis club". The courts themselves were positioned in a way so that the players were nearly always facing the Sun, except between 11:00 AM to 1:00 PM. As such, the final was scheduled for 11:15 AM to avoid that issue.

The capacity on the main court was nowhere close to being able to accommodate all of the people interested in attending the match. Once the second semifinal concluded, workers arrived to construct a secondary set of bleachers to greatly increase the seating capacity. Tickets for these seats were not sold until 9:00 AM on the day of the match, only about two hours before the match itself. Fans wanting to buy tickets began to form a line outside the club the afternoon before the day of the match, some of whom paid people to hold their place in line for that afternoon or overnight. The makeshift bleachers were still being built on the morning of the match and were not completed until within an hour of the scheduled start time of the match. As such, there was no time for the building inspector to test the safety of the bleachers; however, the lack of safety awareness largely did not concern or deter the ticketed spectators. Seated tickets sold out at 300 francs each, (Note: The conversion rate was about 25 francs to 1 US dollar.) already about six times more than the cost of tickets at the U.S. National Championship men's singles final, which were sold at as low as $2 per seat at the time. In addition to seated tickets, standing room was also sold out at 100 francs per person. Moreover, many tickets were scalped at up to 1200 francs, equivalent to about $48.

The attendance at the match was estimated to be between 3000 and 6000, depending on who was counted. In addition, there were far more outside the venue who found alternative ways to see the match. Some people climbed eucalyptus trees or ladders that they had rented to get a glimpse of the match. The owner of a villa across the street sold standing room at 20 francs for people to watch the match from their upper-floor windows. After their window space overflowed, they dismantled tiles from their roof and sold attic space in which people could bring chairs to stand on and see the match by peering out from the part of the roof with removed tiles. Tunis commented, "Pretty soon every house in the vicinity looked half undressed, a hundred faces stucks out of the attics as though the villas were made of cardboard." The Carlton Hotel overlooking the court followed suit and also had people watching the match from their window balconies. A large group of people also watched the match from the roof of the Carlton Club garage.

== Match summary ==
Tournament referee George Simond chose the match officials, all of whom were agreed upon by Lenglen and Wills. The chair umpire was George Hillyard. The six linesmen were Cyril Tolley, Clement Cazalet, Roman Najuch, Francis Towle, Charles Hope, and Reginald Dunkerley. All of the officials were British. Simond, Hillyard, Tolley, Najuch, Cazalet, and Dunkerley were tennis players themselves. Tolley was also a British Amateur golf champion, while Towle was a hotel magnate. There was no foot fault judge, possibly as a result of a series of foot faults being called against Lenglen in her semifinal match.

=== First set ===
After Wills took an early lead in the match, Lenglen rebounded to win the first set comfortably. The set began with both players holding serve, Lenglen to love and Wills to 30 after falling behind 15–30. Wills carried over the momentum from her service game to break Lenglen and take a 2–1 lead. Although Lenglen had initially saved two break points at 15–40, Wills was eventually able to break on a long point that ended with her hitting a defensive cross-court backhand winner far up the line from well behind the baseline. The final shot prompted a standing ovation from the crowd, who did not expect Lenglen's well-placed previous shot to be returned, let alone hit for a winner. Wills' performance in this game convinced the spectators that Wills could compete with Lenglen and in turn that the match would be competitive.

Nonetheless, Lenglen was able to break Wills in her next three service games after devising a new tactic. In the first three games, she observed that Wills only attempted cross-court backhand winners, never hitting her backhand up the line. Lenglen took advantage of this weakness beginning in the fourth game by hitting drop shots to lure Wills into the net. If Wills was able to get to the drop shot, Lenglen would follow it up with a passing shot to win the point. She had little difficulty in setting up these drop shots because she knew where to position herself whenever Wills was hitting a backhand shot. Meanwhile, Wills lacked the speed to hit a good offensive return off of Lenglen's drop shots. This strategy also made Wills do more running and tired her later in the match. Lenglen's first two breaks and a service hold gave her a 4–2 lead.

Having lost three games in a row, Wills changed her own tactics and opted to come to the net voluntarily in Lenglen's next service game. This strategy helped her get another break to get to 3–4 after Lenglen was only able to hit one passing shot in the game. However, Lenglen was able to adjust and get her third break of serve in the next game by hitting deep lobs instead of passing shots whenever Wills came to the net. She then consolidated the break to win the set 6–3. Despite taking the first set, Lenglen went to her mother in the stands for a glass of cognac in-between sets, a practice she was known for doing in her most competitive matches beginning with the 1919 Wimbledon final. Conversely, Wills was not dismayed by losing the first set, as she had a reputation for starting matches slowly only to end up winning in three sets.

First set game-by-game summary
Held serve	SL	HW			SL				SL
(France) Suzanne Lenglen	1	1	1	2	3	4	4	5	6
(United States) Helen Wills	0	1	2	2	2	2	3	3	3
Broke serve			HW	SL		SL	HW	SL	

=== Second set ===
The second set was more competitive than the first. After three service holds to begin the set, Wills again picked up the first break to take a 3–1 lead. She continued to employ her strategy of coming to the net on every point and not giving Lenglen good opportunities to hitting passing shots. At this point, Lenglen stalled the match and again went to the stands for another glass of cognac. When she returned to the court, she broke back as Wills began playing more passively and stopped coming to the net in an effort to conserve energy. After Lenglen held serve to level the set at 3–3, the two competitors played what turned out to be the longest game of the match. Wills began the game trailing 15–40, but saved both break points by coming to the net. She then missed two routine shots on game points before prevailing on the fourteenth point of the game, an unforced error by Lenglen two points after the fourth deuce.

With Wills leading 4–3, the next game became the most controversial. After Lenglen briefly left the court a third time for more cognac, Wills took a 15–30 lead in Lenglen's service game. The next point featured a long rally that ended with Lenglen hitting the ball cross-court near the intersection of the service line and the sideline. Although the shot was called good, it is generally accepted that linesman Cyril Tolley missed the call. Reporter Don Skene in particular noted that it landed wide by "three inches at least". Wills, who typically had a calm demeanor, became enraged and screamed at Tolley to question his call. Although the spectators also backed Wills, the call stood and Lenglen ended up winning the game. Wills then held serve in a game that went to deuce. Lenglen followed suit with a hold to love to keep the set level at 5–5.

"And incidentally it will go down as one of the most grotesque and thrilling and momentous games on record."

— James Thurber on the confusion in the game at 6–5 in the second set.

In the next game, Lenglen broke Wills to 30 to give herself the chance to serve for the match. She took a 40–15 lead in her service game to earn two match points. The first match point became another critical juncture in the match. Lenglen and Wills engaged in a long rally that ended with Wills hitting a powerful cross-court forehand into the corner near the line. Both players, the umpire, and the crowd heard the ball called out, signaling the end of the match. Within moments, photographers and reporters flooded the court and pictures were taken of Lenglen and Wills about to shake hands at the net. However, linesman Charles Hope told the umpire that the ball was in and the call had from a spectator in the stands. Several minutes were needed to clear out all of the people and flowers on the court so that play could resume. When the match continued, Wills won the next three points to break Lenglen and level the match at 6–6.

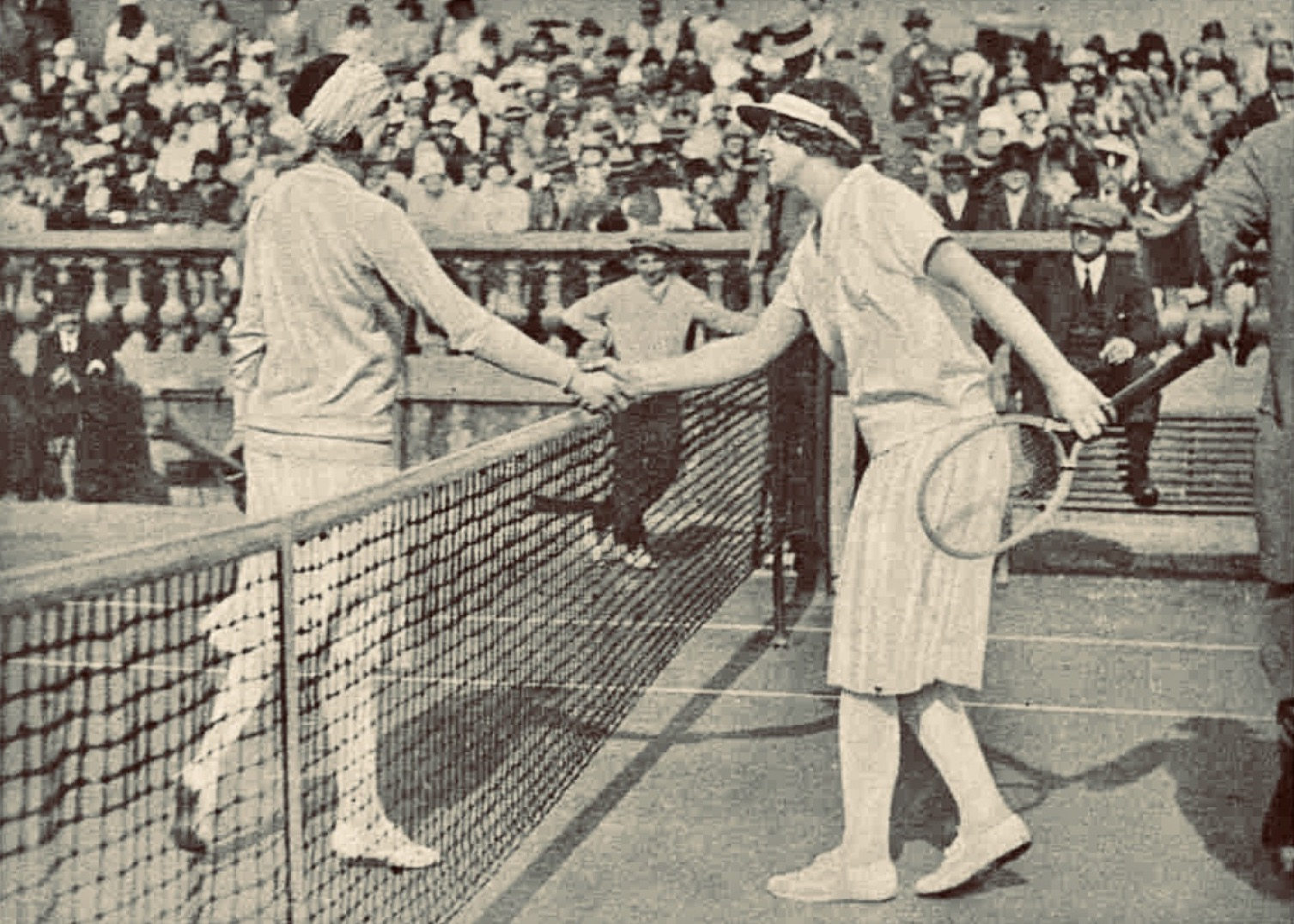
Lenglen and Wills shake hands as a linesman (far right) signals that the match is not over.

Both players had game points in each of the final two games of the match. Wills could not carry her momentum into her service game and fell behind 0–40. Although she won the next four points, Lenglen responded by taking the last three points and the game, setting up a second chance to serve out the match. Wills had a break point at 30–40 and a second after Lenglen had a rare double fault at deuce. However, Lenglen saved both break chances, and won the next two points to earn a third match point. On Lenglen's second shot of the point, she drew Wills into the net with a drop shot that she was barely able to get back. Wills's weak subsequent shot gave Lenglen enough time to run up to near the service line and hit a volley for a winner to end the match 6–3, 8–6.

Second set game-by-game summary
Held serve	HW	SL	HW			SL	HW	SL	HW	SL				SL
(France) Suzanne Lenglen	0	1	1	1	2	3	3	4	4	5	6	6	7	8
(United States) Helen Wills	1	1	2	3	3	3	4	4	5	5	5	6	6	6
Broke serve				HW	SL						SL	HW	SL	

=== Statistics ===
Category	(France) Lenglen	(United States) Wills
First set (19 minutes)
Points won	30/47 (64%)	17/47 (36%)
Break point conversions	3/3 (100%)	2/4 (50%)
Most consecutive points	10	4
Second set (41 minutes)
Points won	52/99 (53%)	47/99 (47%)
Break point conversions	3/9 (33%)	2/4 (50%)
Most consecutive points	4	4
Overall (63 minutes)
Points won	82/146 (56%)	64/146 (44%)
Break point conversions	6/12 (50%)	4/8 (50%)

Source: Little

== Press coverage ==
There was immense interest in covering the match and the lead-up events and activities of both players from when Wills arrived in France. A large number of journalists travelled to the French Riviera from Europe, North America, and South America to cover the match weeks in advance, creating an intense competition for information about anything related to Lenglen and Wills. As a result, not all information published was truthful. This predicament was further complicated by Wills initially avoiding most interview attempts as part of her agreement with the INS to write her own stories. The American journalists present included John Tunis for the American Lawn Tennis magazine and The New Yorker, Allison Danzig for The New York Times, James Thurber for the Riviera edition of The Chicago Tribune, Al Laney for Paris Herald, Paul Gallico for the New York Daily News, and Grantland Rice for Collier's magazine. The French journalists included Gaston Leroux for Le Journal. The British journalists included A. Wallis Myers. Spanish novelist Vicente Blasco Ibáñez was paid 40,000 francs to cover the match despite a lack of familiarity with tennis.

== Aftermath ==
=== Doubles final ===
Lenglen and Wills also faced each other in the doubles final at the Carlton Club tournament, partnering with Julie Vlasto and Hélène Contostavlos respectively. Neither of them had lost a set in the doubles event either. The doubles final was scheduled a little after 2:00 PM, and started only about two hours after the singles final ended. A large fraction of those in attendance for the first match of the day did not stay for the second one. In particular, nearly all of the reporters left the venue so that they could finish their stories and send them back to their respective newspapers. As a result, the second match was almost entirely left out of any newspaper coverage. Although the crowd for the doubles match was smaller, they showed less respect for the players, shouting throughout the match and breaking the usual convention of staying silent during points.

Having already lost the singles final, Wills played more recklessly in the doubles final. She came to the net on every point and regularly poached shots from her partner. Wills also deliberately tried to hit shots toward Lenglen to continue to test who was the better player. Lenglen and Vlasto countered Wills's strategy by hitting their shots away from Wills, either by aiming in the direction of Contostavlos or executing lobs over Wills. Lenglen was noticeably tired during the late stages of the second set and had to rely on Vlasto to help finish the match. Despite both sets being close, Lenglen and Vlasto defeated Wills and Contostavlos 6–4, 8–6, a similar scoreline to the singles final. Their victory was attributed to Contostavlos's performance as the least accomplished player among the four competitors. Even though Wills lost, the aggressiveness of her approach to the match helped her win favor among the remaining crowd. They celebrated Wills's performance at the end of the match despite Lenglen's winning and having cheered Lenglen at the end of the first match of the day.

=== Later Riviera season ===
The press expected the Match of the Century to be the start of a long rivalry between Lenglen and Wills that would continue later in the Riviera season. Wills facilitated the possibility of another encounter by entering singles events each of the next five weeks. On the other hand, Lenglen had previously stated at the beginning of the season that she only intended to compete in singles at three tournaments on the Riviera, a statement she reaffirmed after Wills announced her intention to compete there. As she had already entered singles at both her home club in Nice and the Carlton Club the previous two weeks, Lenglen was expected to set up a potential rematch at her home club, which hosted the South of France Championships the week of 8–14 March. After Wills officially entered the singles event at the tournament, the club began constructing a secondary stand that could seat 10,000 in anticipation for the match.

The week after the Carlton Club tournament, Lenglen entered only the doubles event at Beaulieu. Before her first match, however, she had a nervous collapse while travelling to the tournament, still suffering from exhaustion from the previous week's events. She ultimately ended up playing just one match before withdrawing. Although she also withdrew from the main events at the Monte Carlo tournament in which was Wills was competing, she entered the smaller eight-player doubles draw at the tournament called the Beaumont Cup that was separate from the main doubles event. Lenglen won the Beaumont Cup with Vlasto, while Wills and Leslie Aeschlimann lost in the opposite semifinal largely due to Aeschlimann being ill.

Following Monte Carlo, Lenglen unexpectedly did not enter another tournament until the Carlton Club's April edition when Wills had already left the Riviera, and did not play singles again on the Riviera.

== Significance ==
The closeness of the first match combined with Wills's aggressive play challenged Lenglen's perceived invincibility and made the press and spectators think that Wills could defeat Lenglen in singles and establish herself as the better player and the best in the world.

The press believed Wills and Lenglen were similar caliber players and that a rematch could go either way.

Wills also met Frederick Moody, her future husband, at the beginning of the trip.

== Bibliography ==
- Cherry, Jeanne (2018). Helen Wills: Tennis, Art, Life. London: Tennis Gallery Wimbledon. ISBN 978-1999953119.
- Collins, Bud (2010). The Bud Collins History of Tennis (2nd ed.). New York: New Chapter Press. ISBN 978-0942257700.
- Engelmann, Larry (1988). The Goddess and the American Girl: The Story of Suzanne Lenglen and Helen Wills. Oxford University Press. ISBN 978-0195043631.
- King, Billie Jean; Starr, Cynthia (1988). We Have Come a Long Way: The Story of Women's Tennis. New York: McGraw-Hill. ISBN 978-0070346253.
- Little, Alan (1988). Suzanne Lenglen: Tennis idol of the twenties. The Wimbledon Lawn Tennis Museum. ISBN 978-0906741221.
- Little, Alan (2007). Suzanne Lenglen: Tennis Idol of the Twenties. The Wimbledon Lawn Tennis Museum. ISBN 978-0906741436.
- Phillips, Caryl (1999). The Right Set: A Tennis Anthology. Vintage. ISBN 978-0375706462.
- Wagg, Stephen (2011). Myths and Milestones in the History of Sport. Hampshire: Palgrave Macmillan. ISBN 978-0230241251.
