= Lenglen–Dewhurst match at the 1926 Wimbledon Championships =

1926 tennis match

1926 Wimbledon second-round match
- (France) Suzanne Lenglen vs. (British Ceylon) Evelyn Dewhurst
Set	1	2
(France) Suzanne Lenglen	6	6
(British Ceylon) Evelyn Dewhurst	2	2
- Date: 25 June 1926 (three times rescheduled)
- Tournament: Wimbledon Championships
- Location: All England Club, Church Road, Wimbledon
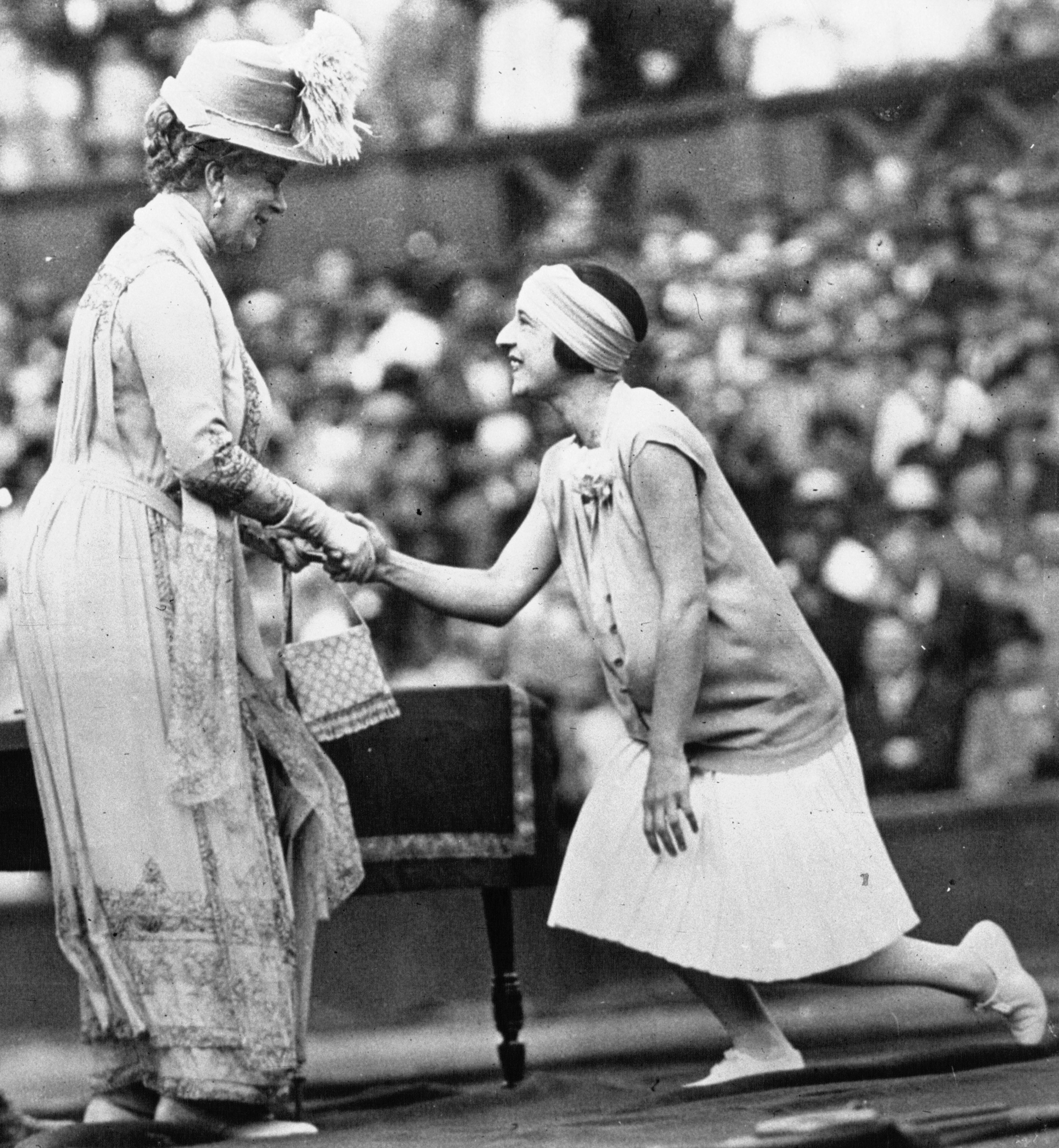
- Lenglen (right) with Queen Mary at the 1926 Wimbledon Championships

The Lenglen–Dewhurst match at the 1926 Wimbledon Championships was a second-round match between French tennis player Suzanne Lenglen and British Ceylonese tennis player Evelyn Dewhurst at the 1926 Wimbledon Championships, one of the four Grand Slam tournaments. Lenglen, a six-time Wimbledon singles champion who was undefeated in singles at the tournament, defeated Dewhurst in straight sets for the last competitive win of her amateur career. The match had been rescheduled three times. Lenglen withdrew from the tournament following the match and also forfeited her amateur status a month after the tournament to become a professional tennis player.

The match was enshrouded in controversy after it needed to be rescheduled to accommodate the British royal family. As Lenglen did not think the rescheduled time fit in with her doubles match, she asked for the match to be rescheduled again. Although it never was, Lenglen did not show up at the rescheduled time. As a result, tournament officials ultimately rescheduled the match anyway, moving it to the following day to be played following her doubles match. After her doubles match took longer than anticipated to complete, the singles match was rescheduled a third time again to the following day. Although Lenglen won the match, the British crowd that had long been extremely supportive of Lenglen turned against her after the press erroneously reported the postponements had angered Queen Mary, even though Queen Mary was supportive of Lenglen in the situation. Lenglen's fallout with the British crowd was one of the underlying factors in her leaving amateur tennis.

Lenglen's unwillingness to comply with the first rescheduled time of the match was in part due to two other separate issues, namely her family struggling with their finances and the French Tennis Federation demanding that she partner with a compatriot instead of her longtime doubles partner American Elizabeth Ryan.

== Background ==
The 1926 Wimbledon Championships were known as the Jubilee Championships to commemorate the 50th edition of the tournament. Suzanne Lenglen entered the tournament on a 179-match win streak in singles and notably defeated her main competitive rival American Helen Wills earlier in the year in the Match of the Century in their only ever encounter. Shortly before Wimbledon, Wills unexpectedly needed to withdraw due to appendicitis. Although Lenglen was a heavy favourite with Wills not participating, the tournament began with two issues. With her father ill and her family expending money, Lenglen's finances were more of a concern than they had been in previous years. For previous Wimbledon tournaments, national tennis associations would pay top players more than what they needed to cover their travel expenses so they could earn money while maintaining their amateur status. However, in 1926, the Wimbledon club covered the travel expenses of top players without giving them anything extra. Meanwhile, the French Tennis Federation wanted Lenglen to enter the doubles event with a French partner in Julie Vlasto rather than her usual partner, Elizabeth Ryan. Lenglen preferred to enter with Ryan even though she had partnered Vlasto at the previous two French Championships in Ryan's absence. Although she agreed to play with Vlasto, the situation later worsened. Lenglen became unsettled by being drawn against Ryan in her opening doubles match. In the lead-up to this match, Lenglen and Ryan played an exhibition set of doubles together with Queen Mary in attendance to celebrate the start of the Jubilee Championships. They were surprisingly defeated 6–8 by McKane and Kea Bouman, despite having only lost one set together in open competition in their careers.

== Match details ==
Lenglen's situation did not improve once the tournament began. She opened the singles event with an uncharacteristic win against Browne in which she lost five games, the same number she had lost in the entire 1925 singles event. She was originally supposed to play the doubles match against Ryan at 4:30 PM the following day, followed by her second singles match of the day. However, her singles match was moved to 2:00 PM before the doubles match to accommodate the royal family who planned to be in attendance. Lenglen was not informed of the change until the next morning. She did not want to play the singles before her more important doubles, and did not want to play at 2:00 PM because she had a doctor's appointment at the time. Lenglen asked her regular mixed doubles partner Jacques Brugnon to tell the tournament referee to reschedule the singles match. He never received the message. By the time Lenglen arrived on the grounds at 3:30 PM, Queen Mary and the rest of the crowd were waiting over an hour. After Wimbledon officials confronted her in anger, she refused to play either match.

Neither the officials, nor Lenglen's opponents wanted her defaulted. As a result, the club adhered to Lenglen's wishes and rescheduled both matches the following day, with the doubles first. Nonetheless, Lenglen and Vlasto were defeated by Ryan and her partner Mary Browne in three sets, despite having three match points when they were ahead 7–6 in the second set. The crowd who had typically supported Lenglen were against her, in part as a result of a fabricated story in the newspaper that Lenglen had angered Queen Mary. With the long duration of the match, the singles was again delayed until the following day. Although Lenglen defeated Evelyn Dewhurst in the match, she lost four games, far more than anyone expected.

== Aftermath ==
After the match, Lenglen played and won her opening mixed doubles match before withdrawing from both singles and mixed doubles due to a shoulder injury. Lenglen ultimately decided that this was her last amateur tournament, ending her career in the midst of a 179-match win streak, having not lost since 1921. A month later, she signed a $50,000 contract with American sports promotor C. C. Pyle to turn professional and headline an exhibition tour in the United States. After that tour was a financial success, Lenglen headlined another shorter tour in the United Kingdom a few months later. Dewhurst also turned professional to join Lenglen on that second tour.

In the wake of Lenglen's withdrawal from the tournament, Kitty Godfree won her second Wimbledon title. In Lenglen's absence from amateur tennis in the coming years, Helen Wills established herself as the best women's tennis player in the world, winning the next four editions of Wimbledon in particular. Although Lenglen retired from professional tennis the following year, she never regained her amateur status and a rematch of the Match of the Century with Wills never materialized.
