= 1926 Wimbledon Championships – Women's doubles =

Women's doubles
- 1926 Wimbledon Championships

Final
- Champions: (United States) Mary Browne (United States) Elizabeth Ryan
- Runners-up: (United Kingdom) Evelyn Colyer (United Kingdom) Kitty Godfree
- Score: 6–1, 6–1

Details
- Draw: 41 (4Q)
- Seeds: –

Events
Singles	men	women		boys	girls
Doubles	men	women	mixed	boys	girls
- Wimbledon Championships

Suzanne Lenglen and Elizabeth Ryan were the defending champions, but decided not to play together. Lenglen partnered with Julie Vlasto, but lost in the second round to Ryan and her partner Mary Browne.

Browne and Ryan defeated Evelyn Colyer and Kitty Godfree in the final, 6–1, 6–1 to win the ladies' doubles tennis title at the 1926 Wimbledon Championships.

== Draw ==
Key

- Q = Qualifier
- WC = Wild card
- LL = Lucky loser
- Alt = Alternate
- ITF = ITF entry
- PR = Protected ranking
- SR = Special ranking
- SE = Special exempt
- JE = Junior exempt
- JR = Junior Accelerator Programme entrant
- CO = College Accelerator Programme entrant
- NG = Next Gen Accelerator Program entrant
- w/o = Walkover
- r = Retired
- d = Defaulted

=== Finals ===
Quarterfinals
(United Kingdom) Dorothea Lambert Chambers (United Kingdom) Ermyntrude Harvey	6	2	5
(United States) Mary Browne (United States) Elizabeth Ryan	3	6	7
(United Kingdom) JL Colegate (United Kingdom) CJ Tyrrell	6	3
(United Kingdom) Winifred Beamish (United Kingdom) Enid Clarke	8	6
(United Kingdom) Joan Fry (United Kingdom) Marie Hazel	3	4
Q	(United Kingdom) Naomi Jackson-Feilden (United Kingdom) Molly Welsh	6	6
(United Kingdom) NQ Radcliffe-Platt (United Kingdom) PM Radcliffe	2	3
(United Kingdom) Evelyn Colyer (United Kingdom) Kitty Godfree	6	6

Semifinals
(United States) Mary Browne (United States) Elizabeth Ryan	6	6
(United Kingdom) Winifred Beamish (United Kingdom) Enid Clarke	2	3
Q	(United Kingdom) Naomi Jackson-Feilden (United Kingdom) Molly Welsh	2	3
(United Kingdom) Evelyn Colyer (United Kingdom) Kitty Godfree	6	6

Final
(United States) Mary Browne (United States) Elizabeth Ryan	6	6
(United Kingdom) Evelyn Colyer (United Kingdom) Kitty Godfree	1	1

=== Top half ===
==== Section 1 ====
First round

Second round
(United Kingdom) Joyce Brown (United Kingdom) Phoebe Watson	3	4
(United Kingdom) Dorothea Lambert Chambers (United Kingdom) Ermyntrude Harvey	6	6
(United Kingdom) Dorothy Alexander (United Kingdom) D Lee Mumford	1	3
(France) Elizabeth Macready (United Kingdom) Agnes Tuckey	6	6
(United States) Mary Browne (United States) Elizabeth Ryan	3	9	6
(France) Suzanne Lenglen (France) Julie Vlasto	6	7	2
(United Kingdom) Enid Broadbridge (United Kingdom) Irene Maltby	13	6
EC Mogg (United Kingdom) Hilary Stebbing	11	0

Third round
(United Kingdom) D Lambert Chambers (United Kingdom) E Harvey	6	6
(France) E Macready (United Kingdom) A Tuckey	4	2
(United States) M Browne (United States) E Ryan	6	2	6
(United Kingdom) E Broadbridge (United Kingdom) I Maltby	1	6	3

Quarterfinals
(United Kingdom) D Lambert Chambers (United Kingdom) E Harvey	6	2	5
(United States) M Browne (United States) E Ryan	3	6	7

The nationality of EC Mogg is unknown.

==== Section 2 ====
First round
Q	(United Kingdom) E Norman (United Kingdom) Mrs MB Reckitt	4	7	6
Q	(United Kingdom) Mary Cambridge (United Kingdom) Doris Craddock	6	5	1
(Republic of Ireland) WM Haughton (Republic of Ireland) Mrs RRW Jackson	3	4
(United Kingdom) Winifred Beamish (United Kingdom) Enid Clarke	6	6
(United Kingdom) Violet Chamberlain (United Kingdom) Aurea Edgington	6	6
Q	(United Kingdom) Louise Bull (United Kingdom) Ariadne Rodocanachi	3	4
(United Kingdom) Dorothy Hill (United Kingdom) Joan Ridley	6	4	6
(United Kingdom) Madge Valantine (United Kingdom) Honor Woolrych	4	6	4
(United Kingdom) Eileen Bennett (United Kingdom) Gwen Sterry	1	4
(United Kingdom) Elsie Goldsack (United Kingdom) Dorothy Holman	6	6

Second round
(British Ceylon) Evelyn Dewhurst (United Kingdom) Gladys Seel	6	5	6
(United Kingdom) Mabel Mavrogordato (United Kingdom) MA Thomas	3	7	1
(United Kingdom) JL Colegate (United Kingdom) CJ Tyrrell	6	6
Q	(United Kingdom) E Norman (United Kingdom) Mrs MB Reckitt	1	1
(United Kingdom) W Beamish (United Kingdom) E Clarke	6	6
(United Kingdom) V Chamberlain (United Kingdom) A Edgington	2	1
(United Kingdom) D Hill (United Kingdom) J Ridley	8	5	6
(United Kingdom) E Goldsack (United Kingdom) D Holman	6	7	2

Third round
(British Ceylon) E Dewhurst (United Kingdom) G Seel	6	2	4
(United Kingdom) JL Colegate (United Kingdom) CJ Tyrrell	2	6	6
(United Kingdom) W Beamish (United Kingdom) E Clarke	6	6
(United Kingdom) D Hill (United Kingdom) J Ridley	2	2

Quarterfinals
(United Kingdom) JL Colegate (United Kingdom) CJ Tyrrell	6	3
(United Kingdom) W Beamish (United Kingdom) E Clarke	8	6

=== Bottom half ===
==== Section 3 ====
First round
Mrs Herriot (United Kingdom) Mrs WE Hudleston	1	3
(New Zealand) Marjorie MacFarlane (United Kingdom) Mrs M Marshall	6	6
(United Kingdom) Betty Dix (United Kingdom) Christabel Hardie	1	4
(United Kingdom) Mary McIlquham (United Kingdom) Dorothy Shepherd-Barron	6	6
(United Kingdom) Mrs Bruce-May; Mrs van Praagh	1	4
(United States) Marion Jessup (United States) Molla Mallory	6	6
(United Kingdom) Joan Fry (United Kingdom) Marie Hazel	6	6
(United Kingdom) Claire Beckingham (United Kingdom) EM Beckingham	4	4

Second round
(New Zealand) M MacFarlane (United Kingdom) Mrs M Marshall	3	0
(United Kingdom) M McIlquham (United Kingdom) D Shepherd-Barron	6	6
(United States) M Jessup (United States) M Mallory	3	2
(United Kingdom) J Fry (United Kingdom) M Hazel	6	6
(United Kingdom) Betty Nuthall (United Kingdom) Peggy Saunders	5	4
(United States) Anna Harper (United States) LV McCune	7	6
(Netherlands) Kea Bouman (France) Simonne Mathieu	3	5
Q	(United Kingdom) Naomi Jackson-Feilden (United Kingdom) Molly Welsh	6	7

Third round
(United Kingdom) M McIlquham (United Kingdom) D Shepherd-Barron	3	6	3
(United Kingdom) J Fry (United Kingdom) M Hazel	6	3	6
(United States) A Harper (United States) LV McCune	5	3
Q	(United Kingdom) N Jackson-Feilden (United Kingdom) M Welsh	7	6

Quarterfinals
(United Kingdom) J Fry (United Kingdom) M Hazel	3	4
Q	(United Kingdom) N Jackson-Feilden (United Kingdom) M Welsh	6	6

The nationalities of Mrs Herriot and Mrs van Praagh are unknown.

==== Section 4 ====
First round

Second round
(United Kingdom) NQ Radcliffe-Platt (United Kingdom) PM Radcliffe	6	6
(United Kingdom) Mrs O Bevir (United Kingdom) R Watson	3	1
(United Kingdom) Peggy Dransfield (United Kingdom) Hazel Hogarth	0	1
(Greece) Hélène Contostavlos (United Kingdom) Domini Crosfield	6	6
(United Kingdom) Evelyn Colyer (United Kingdom) Kitty Godfree	7	6
(Australia) M Elliott (Australia) REJ Stephens	5	1
(United Kingdom) Sylvia Lumley-Ellis (United Kingdom) Eleanor Rose	6	8
(United Kingdom) Peggy Pleydell-Bouverie (United Kingdom) Joan Strawson	1	6

Third round
(United Kingdom) NQ Radcliffe-Platt (United Kingdom) PM Radcliffe	6	6	7
(Greece) H Contostavlos (United Kingdom) D Crosfield	8	2	5
(United Kingdom) E Colyer (United Kingdom) K Godfree	6	7
(United Kingdom) S Lumley-Ellis (United Kingdom) E Rose	2	5

Quarterfinals
(United Kingdom) NQ Radcliffe-Platt (United Kingdom) PM Radcliffe	2	3
(United Kingdom) E Colyer (United Kingdom) K Godfree	6	6
