= 1926 Wimbledon Championships – Mixed doubles =

Mixed doubles
- 1926 Wimbledon Championships

Final
- Champions: (United Kingdom) Leslie Godfree (United Kingdom) Kitty Godfree
- Runners-up: (United States) Howard Kinsey (United States) Mary Browne
- Score: 6–3, 6–4

Details
- Draw: 64 (4Q)
- Seeds: –

Events
Singles	men	women		boys	girls
Doubles	men	women	mixed	boys	girls
- Wimbledon Championships

Jean Borotra and Suzanne Lenglen were the defending champions, but withdrew before their second round match against Howard Kinsey and Mary Browne.

Leslie Godfree and Kitty Godfree defeated Kinsey and Browne in the final, 6–3, 6–4 to win the mixed doubles tennis title at the 1926 Wimbledon Championships. They remain the only married couple to ever win the mixed doubles title at Wimbledon.

== Draw ==
Key

- Q = Qualifier
- WC = Wild card
- LL = Lucky loser
- Alt = Alternate
- ITF = ITF entry
- PR = Protected ranking
- SR = Special ranking
- SE = Special exempt
- JE = Junior exempt
- JR = Junior Accelerator Programme entrant
- CO = College Accelerator Programme entrant
- NG = Next Gen Accelerator Program entrant
- w/o = Walkover
- r = Retired
- d = Defaulted

=== Finals ===
Quarterfinals
(United Kingdom) Leslie Godfree (United Kingdom) Kitty Godfree	6	6
(United Kingdom) RDN Pryce-Jones (United Kingdom) Irene Maltby	4	0
(United States) Vincent Richards (United States) Elizabeth Ryan	8	6
(United Kingdom) Brian Gilbert (United Kingdom) Ermyntrude Harvey	6	3
(Hungary) Béla von Kehrling (Spain) Lilí de Álvarez	8	4	2
(United States) Howard Kinsey (United States) Mary Browne	6	6	6
(United Kingdom) Arthur Berger (United Kingdom) Joan Strawson	6	4	6
(United Kingdom) Pat Hughes (United Kingdom) Madge Valantine	3	6	4

Semifinals
(United Kingdom) Leslie Godfree (United Kingdom) Kitty Godfree	7	6
(United States) Vincent Richards (United States) Elizabeth Ryan	5	4
(United States) Howard Kinsey (United States) Mary Browne	5	6	6
(United Kingdom) Arthur Berger (United Kingdom) Joan Strawson	7	4	0

Final
(United Kingdom) Leslie Godfree (United Kingdom) Kitty Godfree	6	6
(United States) Howard Kinsey (United States) Mary Browne	3	4

=== Top half ===
==== Section 1 ====
First round
(Denmark) Einer Ulrich (United Kingdom) Marie Hazel	9	6	6
(United Kingdom) Ulysses Williams (British Ceylon) Evelyn Dewhurst	11	1	3
(United States) Donald Stralem (United Kingdom) Dorothy Hill	1	0
(United Kingdom) Leslie Godfree (United Kingdom) Kitty Godfree	6	6
(Soviet Union) Sergei Rodzianko (United Kingdom) Sylvia Lumley-Ellis	w/o
(United Kingdom) Royden Dash (United Kingdom) CJ Tyrrell
(Czechoslovakia) Jan Koželuh (Austria) Lilly von Ellissen	4	6	6
(Switzerland) Charles Aeschlimann (United Kingdom) E Petchell	6	2	8
(United Kingdom) Douglas Watson (United Kingdom) R Watson	6	6
(Mexico) Ignacio de la Borbolla (United Kingdom) D Lee Mumford	0	4
(United Kingdom) RDN Pryce-Jones (United Kingdom) Irene Maltby	6	6
(United Kingdom) Alfred Ingram (United Kingdom) Peggy Pleydell-Bouverie	4	3
(United Kingdom) William Radcliffe (United Kingdom) Eleanor Rose	6	6
(United Kingdom) Laddie Wheatcroft (United Kingdom) Christabel Wheatcroft	4	1
(United Kingdom) Frank Jarvis (United Kingdom) Joan Ridley	1	3
(Canada) Henry Mayes (Greece) Hélène Contostavlos	6	6

Second round
(Denmark) E Ulrich (United Kingdom) M Hazel	2	3
(United Kingdom) L Godfree (United Kingdom) K Godfree	6	6
(United Kingdom) R Dash (United Kingdom) CJ Tyrrell	3	6	3
(Switzerland) C Aeschlimann (United Kingdom) E Petchell	6	1	6
(United Kingdom) D Watson (United Kingdom) R Watson	4	6	3
(United Kingdom) RDN Pryce-Jones (United Kingdom) I Maltby	6	3	6
(United Kingdom) W Radcliffe (United Kingdom) E Rose	5	6	6
(Canada) H Mayes (Greece) H Contostavlos	7	1	3

Third round
(United Kingdom) L Godfree (United Kingdom) K Godfree	6	6
(Switzerland) C Aeschlimann (United Kingdom) E Petchell	1	3
(United Kingdom) RDN Pryce-Jones (United Kingdom) I Maltby	6	4	7
(United Kingdom) W Radcliffe (United Kingdom) E Rose	1	6	5

Quarterfinals
(United Kingdom) L Godfree (United Kingdom) K Godfree	6	6
(United Kingdom) RDN Pryce-Jones (United Kingdom) I Maltby	4	0

==== Section 2 ====
First round
(United Kingdom) Basil Lawrence (United Kingdom) Elsa Haylock	7	7
(Czechoslovakia) Ladislav Žemla (Republic of Ireland) Mrs RRW Jackson	9	9
(United Kingdom) WB Stott (United Kingdom) Dorothy Alexander	8	2
(United Kingdom) Gordon Crole-Rees (United States) Marion Jessup	10	6
(United States) Vincent Richards (United States) Elizabeth Ryan	6	6
(United Kingdom) Ernest Lamb (United Kingdom) Enid Clarke	2	4
(Netherlands) Cornelis Bryan (United Kingdom) Mrs A Clayton	2	1
(India) Bertie Meyer (United Kingdom) Dorothy Shepherd-Barron	6	6
(Netherlands) Hendrik Timmer (Netherlands) Kea Bouman	6	6
(Australia) DJR Sumner (United Kingdom) Elsie Goldsack	0	2
(Australia) EL Jones (Australia) M Elliott	1	1
(France) Henri Cochet (France) Julie Vlasto	6	6
(United Kingdom) Brian Gilbert (United Kingdom) Ermyntrude Harvey	5	6	6
(United Kingdom) Bunny Austin (United Kingdom) Betty Nuthall	7	2	3
Q	(United Kingdom) Vincent Burr (United Kingdom) Agnes Tuckey	3	6
(United Kingdom) Maurice Summerson (United Kingdom) Phoebe Watson	6	8

Second round
(Czechoslovakia) L Žemla (Republic of Ireland) Mrs RRW Jackson	2	6
(United Kingdom) G Crole-Rees (United States) M Jessup	6	8
(United States) V Richards (United States) E Ryan	6	6
(India) B Meyer (United Kingdom) D Shepherd-Barron	4	3
(Netherlands) H Timmer (Netherlands) K Bouman	3	3
(France) H Cochet (France) J Vlasto	6	6
(United Kingdom) B Gilbert (United Kingdom) E Harvey	6	6
(United Kingdom) M Summerson (United Kingdom) P Holcroft Watson	4	0

Third round
(United Kingdom) G Crole-Rees (United States) M Jessup	3	4
(United States) V Richards (United States) E Ryan	6	6
(France) H Cochet (France) J Vlasto	3	7	4
(United Kingdom) B Gilbert (United Kingdom) E Harvey	6	5	6

Quarterfinals
(United States) V Richards (United States) E Ryan	8	6
(United Kingdom) B Gilbert (United Kingdom) E Harvey	6	3

=== Bottom half ===
==== Section 3 ====
First round
(United Kingdom) George Thomas (United Kingdom) Hazel Hogarth	3	2
(United Kingdom) Lewis Michell (United Kingdom) Peggy Saunders	6	6
(United Kingdom) Keats Lester (United Kingdom) Gwen Sterry	7	6
(United Kingdom) Colin Gregory (United Kingdom) Betty Dix	5	4
(Hungary) Béla von Kehrling (Spain) Lilí de Álvarez	6	6
(United Kingdom) Charles Kingsley (United Kingdom) Eileen Bennett	3	3
(South Africa) Pat Spence (United Kingdom) Evelyn Colyer	6	11
(United Kingdom) Douglas Hodges (United Kingdom) Joan Fry	2	9
(United Kingdom) St John Evers (United Kingdom) Mabel Mavrogordato	6	0	4
(Denmark) Axel Petersen (United Kingdom) Hilary Stebbing	4	6	6
(United Kingdom) Cyril Eames (United Kingdom) Winifred Beamish
(Greece) Pan Papadopoulos (United Kingdom) Domini Crosfield	w/o
(United Kingdom) Harold Aitken (United Kingdom) Beatrice Brown	3	0
(France) Jean Borotra (France) Suzanne Lenglen	6	6
(United Kingdom) Francis Stowe (United Kingdom) Enid Broadbridge	1	1
(United States) Howard Kinsey (United States) Mary Browne	6	6

Second round
(United Kingdom) L Michell (United Kingdom) M Saunders	1	3
(United Kingdom) K Lester (United Kingdom) G Sterry	6	6
(Hungary) B von Kehrling (Spain) E de Álvarez	3	6	6
(South Africa) P Spence (United Kingdom) E Colyer	6	4	4
(United Kingdom) StJ Evers (United Kingdom) M Mavrogordato	9	5
(United Kingdom) C Eames (United Kingdom) W Beamish	11	7
(France) J Borotra (France) S Lenglen	w/o
(United States) H Kinsey (United States) M Browne

Third round
(United Kingdom) K Lester (United Kingdom) G Sterry	2	2
(Hungary) B von Kehrling (Spain) E de Álvarez	6	6
(United Kingdom) C Eames (United Kingdom) W Beamish	6	5
(United States) H Kinsey (United States) M Browne	8	7

Quarterfinals
(Hungary) B von Kehrling (Spain) E de Álvarez	8	4	2
(United States) H Kinsey (United States) M Browne	6	6	6

==== Section 4 ====
First round
(United Kingdom) GTC Watt (United Kingdom) Mrs WE Hudleston	1	4
(United Kingdom) Arthur Berger (United Kingdom) Joan Strawson	6	6
(South Africa) Julien Lezard (United Kingdom) Honor Woolrych	8	4	6
Q	(United Kingdom) John Pennycuick (United Kingdom) Eileen Morle	6	6	3
(South Africa) Gerald Sherwell (United Kingdom) Claire Beckingham	9	5	4
(United Kingdom) Fassett Burnett (United Kingdom) Cecily Marriott	7	7	6
(United Kingdom) Bill Swinden (United Kingdom) Mrs Bruce-May	4	6
(United Kingdom) Reginald Knight (United Kingdom) Norah Middleton	6	8
Q	(United Kingdom) Max Whitmore; Mrs P Wilkin	0	3
(United Kingdom) Henry Standring (United Kingdom) E Phayre	6	6
(United Kingdom) Ambrose Dudley (United Kingdom) JL Colegate	6	4	4
(United Kingdom) Pat Hughes (United Kingdom) Madge Valantine	2	6	6
(United Kingdom) Patrick Wheatley (United Kingdom) Dorothea Lambert Chambers	6	3	6
(United Kingdom) Teddy Higgs (United Kingdom) Mary McIlquham	2	6	2
(United Kingdom) Donald Greig (United States) Molla Mallory	6	5	6
(France) Jacques Brugnon (France) Simonne Mathieu	2	7	1

Second round
(United Kingdom) A Berger (United Kingdom) J Strawson	2	7	6
(South Africa) J Lezard (United Kingdom) H Woolrych	6	5	2
Q	(United Kingdom) F Burnett (United Kingdom) C Marriott	3	2
(United Kingdom) R Knight (United Kingdom) N Middleton	6	6
(United Kingdom) H Standring (United Kingdom) E Phayre	3	2
(United Kingdom) P Hughes (United Kingdom) M Valantine	6	6
(United Kingdom) P Wheatley (United Kingdom) D Lambert Chambers	6	6
(United Kingdom) D Greig (United States) M Mallory	4	2

Third round
(United Kingdom) A Berger (United Kingdom) J Strawson	6	6
(United Kingdom) R Knight (United Kingdom) N Middleton	4	4
(United Kingdom) P Hughes (United Kingdom) M Valantine	6	1	8
(United Kingdom) P Wheatley (United Kingdom) D Lambert Chambers	4	6	6

Quarterfinals
(United Kingdom) A Berger (United Kingdom) J Strawson	6	4	6
(United Kingdom) P Hughes (United Kingdom) M Valantine	3	6	4

The nationality of Mrs P Wilkin is unknown.
