= 1926 French Championships – Women's singles =

Women's singles
- 1926 French Championships

Final
- Champion: (France) Suzanne Lenglen
- Runner-up: (United States) Mary Kendall Browne
- Score: 6–1, 6–0

Details
- Draw: 32
- Seeds: 8

Events
| Singles | men | women |
| Doubles | men | women |
| ← 1925 · | French Championships | · 1927 → |

Suzanne Lenglen defeated Mary Kendall Browne 6–1, 6–0 in the final to win the women's singles tennis title at the 1926 French Championships. Lenglen dropped four games in her five matches.

== Seeds ==
The seeded players are listed below. Suzanne Lenglen is the champion; others show the round in which they were eliminated.

1. (France) Suzanne Lenglen (champion)
2. (United States) Helen Wills (second round)
3. (United States) Mary Kendall Browne (final)
4. (United States) Elizabeth Ryan (quarterfinals)
5. (United Kingdom) Joan Fry (semifinals)
6. (United Kingdom) Kathleen McKane Godfree (quarterfinals)
7. (France) Diddie Vlasto (first round)
8. (France) Yvonne Bourgeois (first round)

== Draw ==
=== Key ===
- Q = Qualifier
- WC = Wild card
- LL = Lucky loser
- r = Retired

=== Finals ===
Quarterfinals
1 | (France) Suzanne Lenglen | 6 | 6
(France) Simonne Mathieu | 0 | 0
4 | (United States) Elizabeth Ryan | 5 | 6 | 9
5 | (United Kingdom) Joan Fry | 7 | 3 | 11
3 | (United States) Mary K. Browne | 7 | 6
6 | (United Kingdom) Kathleen McKane Godfree | 5 | 0
(Greece) Hélène Contostavlos | 2 | 9 | 6
(Netherlands) Kea Bouman | 6 | 7 | 8

Semifinals
1 | (France) Suzanne Lenglen | 6 | 6
5 | (United Kingdom) Joan Fry | 2 | 1
3 | (United States) Mary K. Browne | 8 | 6
(Netherlands) Kea Bouman | 6 | 2

Finals
1 | (France) Suzanne Lenglen | 6 | 6
3 | (United States) Mary K. Browne | 1 | 0

=== Earlier rounds ===
==== Section 1 ====
First round
1 | (France) Lenglen | 6 | 6
(Hungary) Péteri | 0 | 0
(United Kingdom) Shepherd-Barron | 6 | 6
(France) Conquet | 4 | 3
(United States) Jessup | 6 | 6
(France) Lebesnerais | 3 | 2
(France) Mathieu | 6 | 0 | 6
8 | (France) Bourgeois | 2 | 6 | 1
4 | (United States) Ryan | 5 | 6 | 6
(France) Danet | 7 | 2 | 3
(France) Vaussard | 6 | 6
(France) Charnelet | 3 | 1
5 | (United Kingdom) Fry | 6 | 6
(France) Bourgeois | 4 | 1
(France) Descleres | 6 | 6
(France) Le Conte | 2 | 4

Second round
1 | (France) Lenglen | 6 | 6
(United Kingdom) Shepherd-Barron | 0 | 0
(United States) Jessup | 6 | 7 | 0
(France) Mathieu | 2 | 9 | 6
4 | (United States) Ryan | 6 | 6
(France) Vaussard | 4 | 2
5 | (United Kingdom) Fry | 13 | 6
(France) Descleres | 11 | 1

Quarterfinals
1 | (France) Lenglen | 6 | 6
(France) Mathieu | 0 | 0
4 | (United States) Ryan | 5 | 6 | 9
5 | (United Kingdom) Fry | 7 | 3 | 11

Semifinals
1 | (France) Lenglen | 6 | 6
5 | (United Kingdom) Fry | 2 | 1

==== Section 2 ====
First round
3 | (United States) Browne | 6 | 6
(France) Des Landes De Danoet | 3 | 1
(France) Devé | 6 | 6
(United Kingdom) Munford | 3 | 4
(France) Grasset | 6 | 6
(France) Wyns-Speranza | 1 | 2
(United Kingdom) De Borman | 1 | 2
6 | (United Kingdom) Godfree | 6 | 6
(France) Lecaron | 4 | 2
(Greece) Contostavlos | 6 | 6
(France) Sherbatskoy | 6 | 6
7 | (France) Vlasto | 3 | 0
(Netherlands) Bouman | 6 | 6
(United Kingdom) Colyer | 2 | 1
(France) Golding | 3 | 5
2 | (United States) Wills | 6 | 7

Second round
3 | (United States) Browne | 6 | 4 | 6
(France) Devé | 4 | 6 | 3
(France) Grasset | 4 | 4
6 | (United Kingdom) Godfree | 6 | 6
(Greece) Contostavlos | 6 | 6
7 | (France) Vlasto | 2 | 2
(Netherlands) Bouman | w/o
2 | (United States) Wills

Quarterfinals
3 | (United States) Browne | 7 | 6
6 | (United Kingdom) Godfree | 5 | 0
(Greece) Contostavlos | 2 | 9 | 6
(Netherlands) Bouman | 6 | 7 | 8

Semifinals
3 | (United States) Browne | 8 | 6
(Netherlands) Bouman | 6 | 2

| Preceded by 1926 Australasian Championships – Women's singles | Grand Slam women's singles | Succeeded by 1926 Wimbledon Championships – Women's singles |
