= 1926 Wimbledon Championships – Women's singles =

Women's singles
- 1926 Wimbledon Championships

Final
- Champion: (United Kingdom) Kitty Godfree
- Runner-up: (Spain) Lilí de Álvarez
- Score: 6–2, 4–6, 6–3

Details
- Draw: 64 (8Q)
- Seeds: –

Events
Singles	men	women		boys	girls
Doubles	men	women	mixed	boys	girls
- Wimbledon Championships

Kitty Godfree defeated Lilí de Álvarez 6–2, 4–6, 6–3 to win the Ladies' Singles at the 1926 Wimbledon Championships.

Suzanne Lenglen was the defending champion, but withdrew from her third round match against Claire Beckingham.

== Draw ==
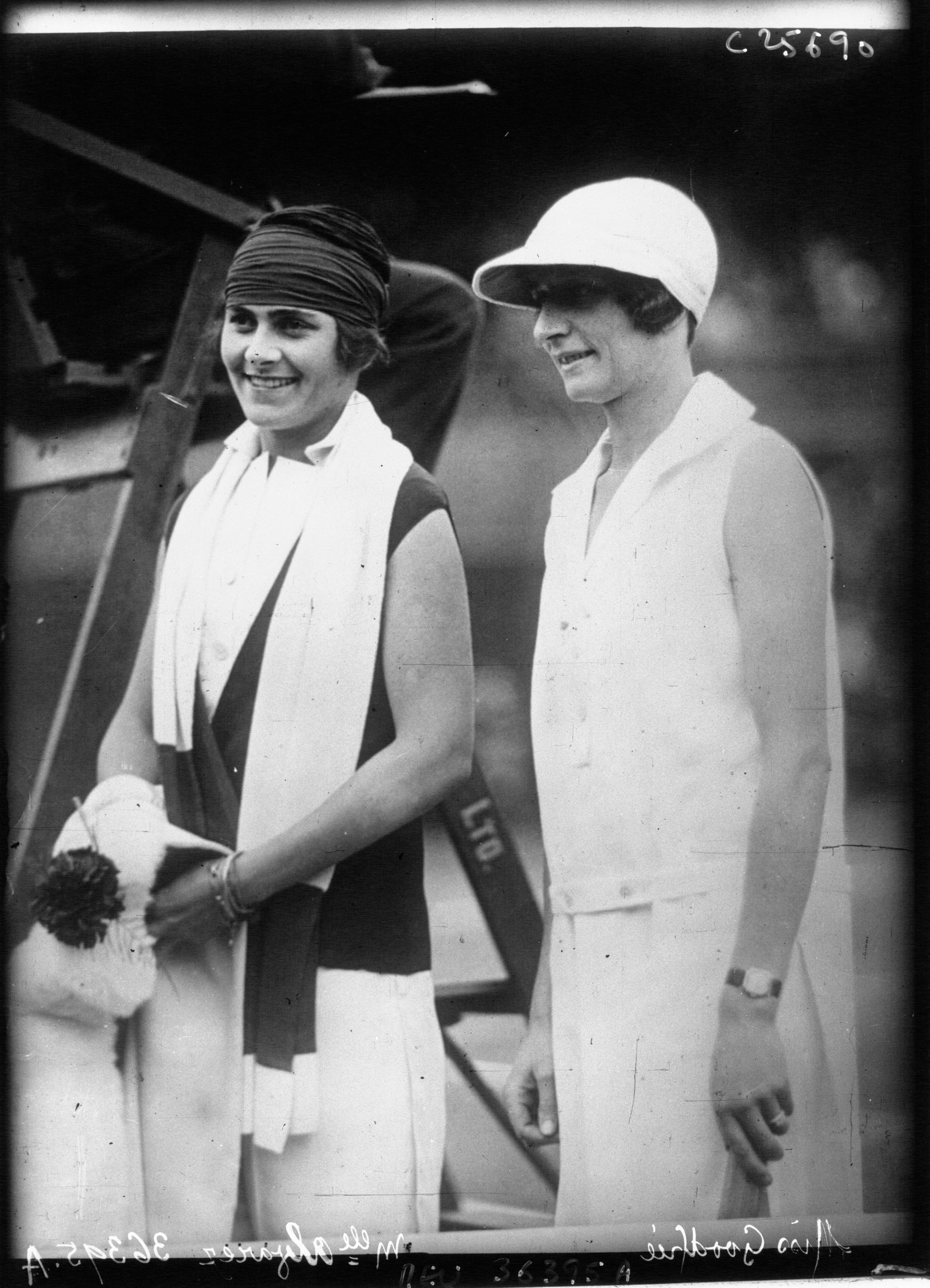
Lilí de Álvarez (left) and Kitty Godfree (right) at the 1926 Wimbledon Championships ladies singles final.

Key

- Q = Qualifier
- WC = Wild card
- LL = Lucky loser
- Alt = Alternate
- ITF = ITF entry
- PR = Protected ranking
- SR = Special ranking
- SE = Special exempt
- JE = Junior exempt
- JR = Junior Accelerator Programme entrant
- CO = College Accelerator Programme entrant
- NG = Next Gen Accelerator Program entrant
- w/o = Walkover
- r = Retired
- d = Defaulted

=== Finals ===
Quarterfinals
(United Kingdom) Claire Beckingham	2	2
(Spain) Lilí de Álvarez	6	6
(United States) Molla Mallory	3	7	6
(Netherlands) Kea Bouman	6	5	3
(France) Julie Vlasto	6	6
(Greece) Hélène Contostavlos	3	3
(United Kingdom) CJ Tyrrell	2	0
(United Kingdom) Kitty Godfree	6	6

Semifinals
(Spain) Lilí de Álvarez	6	6
(United States) Molla Mallory	2	2
(France) Julie Vlasto	4	0
(United Kingdom) Kitty Godfree	6	6

Final
(Spain) Lilí de Álvarez	2	6	3
(United Kingdom) Kitty Godfree	6	4	6

=== Top half ===
==== Section 1 ====
First round
(United Kingdom) Mary McIlquham	5	1
(United Kingdom) Claire Beckingham	7	6
(United Kingdom) Elsa Haylock	6	6
(United Kingdom) Doris Craddock	2	3
(France) Suzanne Lenglen	6	6
(United States) Mary Browne	2	3
Q	(United Kingdom) Betty Dix	9	4
(British Ceylon) Evelyn Dewhurst	11	6
(Republic of Ireland) WM Haughton	2	0
(Spain) Lilí de Alvarez	6	6
Q	(United Kingdom) Dorothy Holman	6	6
(United Kingdom) E Norman	3	2
(United Kingdom) P Watson	6	8
(United Kingdom) R Watson	0	6
(United Kingdom) Betty Nuthall	6	5	6
(Australia) M Elliott	4	7	2

Second round
(United Kingdom) C Beckingham	6	6
(United Kingdom) E Haylock	4	2
(France) S Lenglen	6	6
(British Ceylon) E Dewhurst	2	2
(Spain) E de Alvarez	6	3	6
Q	(United Kingdom) D Holman	4	6	2
(United Kingdom) P Watson	6	6
(United Kingdom) B Nuthall	3	0

Third round
(United Kingdom) C Beckingham
(France) S Lenglen	w/o
(Spain) E de Alvarez	6	6
(United Kingdom) P Watson	1	3

Quarterfinals
(United Kingdom) C Beckingham	2	2
(Spain) E de Alvarez	6	6

==== Section 2 ====
First round
(United Kingdom) Joan Fry	6	6
(United Kingdom) Mrs M Marshall	1	0
Q	(United Kingdom) Weeta Crawshay-Williams	3	2
(United Kingdom) Eileen Bennett	6	6
(United Kingdom) Phyllis Whitley	4	2
(United Kingdom) Aurea Edgington	6	6
(United States) Molla Mallory	6	6
(United States) Anna Harper	1	2
(United Kingdom) GJ Gilder
(Canada) Mrs HF Wright	w/o
(United Kingdom) Dorothy Hill	6	7
(United Kingdom) Peggy Saunders	1	5
(United Kingdom) Elsie Goldsack	0	1
(Netherlands) Kea Bouman	6	6
(United Kingdom) Domini Crosfield
(United States) Helen Wills	w/o

Second round
(United Kingdom) J Fry	6	4	7
(United Kingdom) E Bennett	3	6	5
(United Kingdom) A Edgington	2	1
(United States) M Mallory	6	6
(United Kingdom) GJ Gilder	6	1	2
(United Kingdom) D Hill	3	6	6
(Netherlands) K Bouman	6	6
(United Kingdom) D Crosfield	0	0

Third round
(United Kingdom) J Fry	6	4	5
(United States) M Mallory	4	6	7
(United Kingdom) D Hill	3	2
(Netherlands) K Bouman	6	6

Quarterfinals
(United States) M Mallory	3	7	6
(Netherlands) K Bouman	6	5	3

=== Bottom half ===
==== Section 3 ====
First round
(United Kingdom) Evelyn Colyer	7	6
Q	(United Kingdom) Violet Chamberlain	5	2
Q	(United Kingdom) Peggy Dransfield	1	2
(France) Julie Vlasto	6	6
(United Kingdom) Gwen Sterry	6	6
Q	(United Kingdom) Mrs MB Reckitt	1	3
(United Kingdom) Joan Strawson	6	3	5
(Republic of Ireland) Mrs RRW Jackson	3	6	7
(United Kingdom) Mabel Mavrogordato	2	4
(United States) Marion Jessup	6	6
Q	(United Kingdom) Eileen Morle	4	1
(Greece) Hélène Contostavlos	6	6
(United Kingdom) Dorothy Shepherd-Barron	1	1
(United Kingdom) Winifred Beamish	6	6
(United Kingdom) Joan Ridley	7	5	2
(Australia) REJ Stephens	5	7	6

Second round
(United Kingdom) E Colyer	4	5
(France) J Vlasto	6	7
(United Kingdom) G Sterry	6	6
(Republic of Ireland) Mrs RRW Jackson	4	2
(United States) M Jessup	6	4	4
(Greece) H Contostavlos	2	6	6
(United Kingdom) W Beamish	6	6
(Australia) REJ Stephens	0	3

Third round
(France) J Vlasto	3	6	6
(United Kingdom) G Sterry	6	3	3
(Greece) H Contostavlos	7	6
(United Kingdom) W Beamish	5	4

Quarterfinals
(France) J Vlasto	6	6
(Greece) H Constostavlos	3	3

==== Section 4 ====
First round
(United Kingdom) CJ Tyrrell	6	6
(New Zealand) Marjorie MacFarlane	4	4
(United Kingdom) Christabel Hardie	6	6
(United States) Anna Harper	4	4
Q	(United Kingdom) Enid Broadbridge	4	0
(United Kingdom) Eleanor Rose	6	6
(France) Simonne Mathieu	8	4	2
(United Kingdom) Sylvia Lumley-Ellis	6	6	6
(United Kingdom) Ermyntrude Harvey	5	5
(United Kingdom) Enid Clarke	7	7
(United Kingdom) JL Colegate	0	4
(United States) Elizabeth Ryan	6	6
(United Kingdom) Honor Woolrych
(Australia) Dorothy Rendall	w/o
(Austria) Lilly von Ellissen	0	0
(United Kingdom) Kitty Godfree	6	6

Second round
(United Kingdom) CJ Tyrrell	4	6	6
(United Kingdom) C Hardie	6	2	4
(United Kingdom) E Rose	6	1	1
(United Kingdom) S Lumley-Ellis	2	6	6
(United Kingdom) E Clarke	3	2
(United States) E Ryan	6	6
(United Kingdom) H Woolrych	2	0
(United Kingdom) K Godfree	6	6

Third round
(United Kingdom) CJ Tyrrell	6	1	6
(United Kingdom) S Lumley-Ellis	2	6	0
(United States) E Ryan	6	4	0
(United Kingdom) K Godfree	1	6	6

Quarterfinals
(United Kingdom) CJ Tyrrell	2	0
(United Kingdom) K Godfree	6	6

Preceded by 1926 French Championships	Grand Slams; Women's Singles	Succeeded by 1926 U.S. National Championships
