= Evelyn Dewhurst =

English tennis player

- Country (sports): British Ceylon
- Born: 12 January 1902
- Died: 1993 (aged 90–91)
- Turned pro: 1927

Singles

Grand Slam singles results
- Wimbledon: 2R (1926)

Doubles

Grand Slam doubles results
- Wimbledon: 3R (1926)

Evelyn Dewhurst (née Maud Evelyn Ray Marshall; 12 January 1902 – 1993) was a British Ceylonese tennis player. She competed at the 1926 Wimbledon Championships, reaching the second round in singles and the third round in doubles. Her second-round loss to six-time Wimbledon singles champion Suzanne Lenglen was a pivotal match in Lenglen's career that led to her retiring from amateur tennis to become a professional.

After winning the Ceylonese national championship in 1927, Dewhurst herself retired from amateur tennis to join Lenglen on her short British professional tour. She signed for a low amount of 1000 pounds because she "desperately needed the money". Dewhurst played five more singles matches against Lenglen on the tour, losing all of them. She also partnered with Karel Koželuh or Howard Kinsey to play against Lenglen and either Koželuh or Kinsey in mixed doubles, also losing all of her matches.

== Personal life ==
Evelyn Dewhurst was born with the name Maud Evelyn Ray Marshall on 12 January 1902 to Maud (née Breffit) and Stewart Ray Marshall. She had a brother Stewart Ray Marshall. Evelyn married Godfrey Jefferson Dewhurst, who was an infantry soldier stationed in British Ceylon. Her brother was married to her sister-in-law, Nancy Stevenson Dewhurst.

Following her tennis playing career, Dewhurst published seven books on tennis from 1939 to 1972, a few of which have been reissued more recently since 2000. Dewhurst lived her later life in Teulada in Spain, moving there in 1956, and is considered the first international tourist to settle there.
