= 1925 French Championships – Women's singles =

Women's singles
- 1925 French Championships

Final
- Champion: (France) Suzanne Lenglen
- Runner-up: (United Kingdom) Kitty McKane
- Score: 6–1, 6–2

Details
- Draw: 34
- Seeds: 8

Events
| Singles | men | women |
| Doubles | men | women |
| ← 1924 · | French Championships | · 1926 → |

Suzanne Lenglen defeated Kitty McKane in the final, 6–1 6–2 to win the women's singles tennis title at the 1925 French Championships. This was the first time that the French Championships was staged as a Grand Slam event.

== Seeds ==
1. (France) Suzanne Lenglen (champion)
2. (France) Yvonne Bourgeois (third round)
3. n/a
4. (France) Simonne Passemard (quarterfinals)

5. (Greece) Hélène Contostavlos (semifinals)
6. (France) Marguerite Billout (quarterfinals)
7. (France) Julie Vlasto (semifinals)
8. (France) Jeanne Vaussard (third round)

Click on the seed number of a player to go to their draw section.

== Draw ==
=== Key ===
- Q = Qualifier
- WC = Wild card
- LL = Lucky loser
- Alt = Alternate
- ITF = ITF entry
- PR = Protected ranking
- SR = Special ranking
- SE = Special exempt
- JE = Junior exempt
- JR = Junior Accelerator Programme entrant
- CO = College Accelerator Programme entrant
- NG = Next Gen Accelerator Program entrant
- w/o = Walkover
- r = Retired
- d = Defaulted

=== Finals ===
Quarterfinals
1 | (France) Suzanne Lenglen | 6 | 6
(United Kingdom) Evelyn Colyer | 0 | 2
5 | (Greece) Hélène Contostavlos | 7 | 6
4 | (France) Simonne Passemard | 5 | 3
(United Kingdom) Kitty McKane | 6 | 10
6 | (France) Marguerite Billout | 0 | 8
7 | (France) Julie Vlasto | 6 | 6
(France) Nicole Desclercs | 1 | 2

Semifinals
1 | (France) Suzanne Lenglen | 6 | 6
5 | (Greece) Hélène Contostavlos | 2 | 0
(United Kingdom) Kitty McKane | 6 | 6
7 | (France) Julie Vlasto | 2 | 2

Final
1 | (France) Suzanne Lenglen | 6 | 6
(United Kingdom) Kitty McKane | 1 | 2

=== Top half ===
==== Section 1 ====
First round

Second round
1 | (France) Suzanne Lenglen | 6 | 6
(France) Yvonne des Landes de Danoet | 0 | 0
(France) Elisabeth Macready | 7 | 12
(France) M Beauge | 5 | 10
(United Kingdom) Evelyn Colyer | 8 | 7
(France) Germaine Pigueron | 6 | 5
8 | (France) Jeanne Vaussard
(France) Florand

Third round
1 | (France) S Lenglen | 6 | 6
(France) E Macready | 0 | 0
(United Kingdom) E Colyer | 10 | 3 | 7
8 | (France) J Vaussard | 8 | 6 | 5

Quarterfinals
1 | (France) S Lenglen | 6 | 6
(United Kingdom) E Colyer | 0 | 2

==== Section 2 ====
First round
(France) Marie Conquet | 6 | 6
(United States) Grierson | 1 | 3

Second round
(Spain) Lilí de Álvarez
5 | (Greece) Hélène Contostavlos
(United Kingdom) Mary McIlquham | 6 | 6
(France) Marie Danet | 1 | 4
(France) Germaine Golding
Survana
4 | (France) Simonne Passemard | 3 | 6 | 8
(France) M Conquet | 6 | 4 | 6

Third round
5 | (Greece) H Contostavlos | 3 | 6 | 6
(United Kingdom) M McIlquham | 6 | 2 | 4
(France) G Golding | 2 | 4
4 | (France) S Passemard | 6 | 6

Quarterfinals
5 | (Greece) H Contostavlos | 7 | 6
4 | (France) S Passemard | 5 | 3

The nationality of Survana is unknown.

=== Bottom half ===
==== Section 3 ====
First round
(United States) Maud Rosenbaum | 6 | 6
(France) Daisy Wyns-Speranza | 4 | 4

Second round
(United States) M Rosenbaum | 2 | 1
(United Kingdom) Kitty McKane | 6 | 6
(France) Suzanne Dévé
(France) L Huchez
6 | (France) Marguerite Billout | 6 | 6
(France) S Lecaron | 2 | 1
(Switzerland) Leslie Aeschlimann | 3 | 2
(France) G Grasset | 6 | 6

Third round
(United Kingdom) K McKane | 6 | 6
(France) S Dévé | 1 | 2
6 | (France) M Billout | 8 | 4 | 6
(France) G Grasset | 6 | 6 | 3

Quarterfinals
(United Kingdom) K McKane | 6 | 10
6 | (France) M Billout | 0 | 8

==== Section 4 ====
First round

Second round
(France) Canivet | 1 | 1
7 | (France) Julie Vlasto | 6 | 6
(United Kingdom) Ermyntrude Harvey | 6 | 6
(France) Germaine Charnelet | 2 | 1
(Spain) Isabel Fonrodona
(France) Nicole Desclercs
2 | (France) Yvonne Bourgeois | 6 | 8
(France) Yvonne Huchez | 2 | 6

Third round
7 | (France) J Vlasto | 8 | 6
(United Kingdom) E Harvey | 6 | 4
(France) N Desclercs | 6 | 2 | 6
2 | (France) Y Bourgeois | 3 | 6 | 3

Quarterfinals
7 | (France) J Vlasto | 6 | 6
(France) N Desclercs | 1 | 2

| Preceded by 1925 Australasian Championships – Women's singles | Grand Slam women's singles | Succeeded by 1925 Wimbledon Championships – Women's singles |
