= Hélène Contostavlos =

French-born Greek tennis player

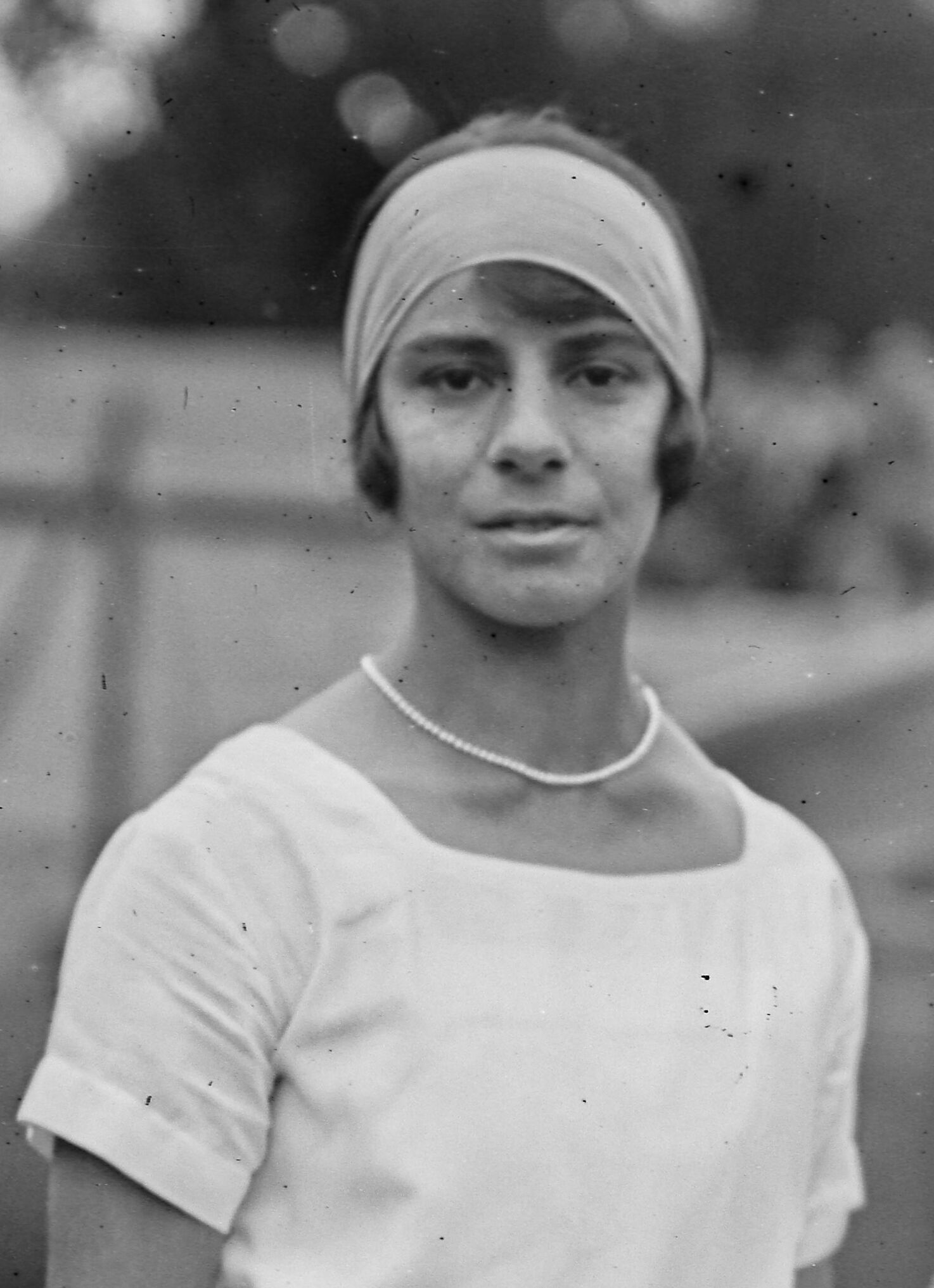
- Contostavlos in 1923
- Country (sports): Greece
- Born: 6 August 1902 Marseille, France
- Died: 3 February 1963 (aged 60) Marseille, France

Grand Slam singles results
- French Open: SF (1925)
- Wimbledon: QF (1926, 1928)

Other tournaments
- WHCC: QF (1923)

Grand Slam doubles results
- French Open: QF (1926)
- Wimbledon: 3R (1926, 1931)

Other doubles tournaments
- WHCC: F (1923)

Grand Slam mixed doubles results
- Wimbledon: 2R (1926, 1928, 1931, 1933)

Hélène Alexander Contostavlos-Nicolopoulo (6 August 1903 – 3 February 1963) was a French-born Greek tennis player. She was a semifinalist at the 1925 French Championships, where she lost to the eventual champion, Suzanne Lenglen. She also made the quarterfinals at Wimbledon twice in 1926 and 1928. Contostavlos played in one major final in doubles at the 1923 World Hard Court Championships, finishing runner-up to Lenglen and Julie Vlasto while partnering with Daisy Speranza.

== Personal life ==
Hélène Contostavlos was born on 6 August 1903 in Marseille to Julie Scaramanga and Alexander Contostavlos, both of whom were Greek. Her parents moved to France for business. Contostavlos married Jean Nicolopoulo in 1928. She was a cousin of fellow tennis player Julie Vlasto. She was also a great-granddaughter of banker Alexandros Kontostavlos.
