= Yvonne Bourgeois =

French tennis player (1902–1983)

- Full name: Yvonne Renée Suzanne Bourgeois
- Country (sports): FRA
- Born: 6 May 1902; Paris, France
- Died: 12 May 1983 (aged 81); Paris, France

Singles

Grand Slam singles results
- French Open: 3R (1925)
- Wimbledon: 2R (1928)

Doubles

Grand Slam doubles results
- French Open: SF (1925)
- Wimbledon: 3R (1928)
- Olympic Games: SF (1924)

Grand Slam mixed doubles results
- French Open: SF (1928)
- Wimbledon: 1R (1928)

Yvonne Bourgeois (6 May 1902 – 12 May 1983) was a French tennis player. She competed in the doubles event at the 1924 Summer Olympics with compatriot Marguerite Billout. They reached the semifinal in which they lost in straight sets to Phyllis Covell and Kathleen McKane. In the bronze medal match they lost to Dorothy Shepherd-Barron and Evelyn Colyer, also in straight sets.

In 1928 she competed in the Wimbledon Championships, reaching the second round in singles, the third round in doubles and the first round in mixed doubles.
