= 1924 Wightman Cup =

International women's tennis competition

Details
- Edition: 2nd

Champion
- Winning nation: Great Britain

The 1924 Wightman Cup was the 2nd edition of the Wightman Cup, the annual women's team tennis competition between the United States and Great Britain. It was held at the All England Lawn Tennis and Croquet Club in Wimbledon, London in the United Kingdom. Great Britain defeated the visiting United States team, winning their first title.

== Result ==
Great Britain
6
All England Lawn Tennis and Croquet Club, Wimbledon, United Kingdom
18–19 June 1924
Grass

United States
1

			1	2	3
1	(United Kingdom) (United States)	Phyllis Covell; Helen Wills	6; 2	6; 4
2	(United Kingdom) (United States)	Kathleen McKane; Molla Mallory	6; 3	6; 3
3	(United Kingdom) (United States)	Kathleen McKane; Helen Wills	6; 2	6; 2
4	(United Kingdom) (United States)	Phyllis Covell; Molla Mallory	6; 2	5; 7	6; 3
5	(United Kingdom) (United States)	Geraldine Beamish; Eleanor Goss	6; 1	8; 10	6; 3
6	(United Kingdom) (United States)	Phyllis Covell / Dorothy Shepherd-Barron; Marion Jessup / Eleanor Goss	6; 2	6; 2
7	(United Kingdom) (United States)	Kathleen McKane / Evelyn Colyer; Hazel Hotchkiss Wightman / Helen Wills	0; 6	3; 6

== See also ==
- 1924 Davis Cup
