= 1925 Wightman Cup =

International women's tennis competition

Details
- Edition: 3rd

Champion
- Winning nation: Great Britain

The 1925 Wightman Cup was the third edition of the Wightman Cup, the annual women's team tennis competition between the United States and Great Britain. It was held at the West Side Tennis Club in Forest Hills, New York, United States. Great Britain defeated the United States to win their second title, the first time the cup was won by the visiting team.

== Result ==
United States
3
West Side Tennis Club, Forest Hills, NY, United States
14–15 August 1925
Grass

Great Britain
4

			1	2	3
1	(United States) (United Kingdom)	Molla Mallory; Kathleen McKane	4; 6	7; 5	0; 6
2	(United States) (United Kingdom)	Helen Wills; Joan Fry	6; 0	7; 5
3	(United States) (United Kingdom)	Eleanor Goss; Dorothea Lambert Chambers	5; 7	6; 3	1; 6
4	(United States) (United Kingdom)	Helen Wills; Kathleen McKane	6; 1	1; 6	9; 7
5	(United States) (United Kingdom)	Molla Mallory; Joan Fry	6; 3	6; 0
6	(United States) (United Kingdom)	Molla Mallory / May Sutton Bundy; Ermyntrude Harvey / Dorothea Lambert Chambers	8; 10	1; 6
7	(United States) (United Kingdom)	Helen Wills / Mary Browne; Kathleen McKane / Evelyn Colyer	0; 6	3; 6

== See also ==
- 1925 Davis Cup
