= 1926 French Championships (tennis) =

- Date: 2–14 June 1926
- Edition: 31st
- Category: 2nd Grand Slam (ITF)
- Surface: Clay
- Location: Paris (XVI^{e}), France
- Venue: Croix-Catelan, Racing Club de France

Champions

Men's singles
- (France) Henri Cochet

Women's singles
- (France) Suzanne Lenglen

Men's doubles
- (United States) Vincent Richards / (United States) Howard Kinsey

Women's doubles
- (France) Suzanne Lenglen / (France) Julie Vlasto

Mixed doubles
- (France) Suzanne Lenglen / (France) Jacques Brugnon
← 1925 ·	French Championships	· 1927 →

The 1926 French Championships (now known as the French Open) was a tennis tournament that took place on outdoor clay courts at the Croix-Catelan of the Racing Club de France in Paris, France. The tournament ran from 2 June until 14 June. It was the 31st staging of the French Championships and the second Grand Slam tournament of the year.

Suzanne Lenglen repeated her feat of winning every event she was eligible for, in her final year of competition before she turned professional; the tournament was also notable for being the first time American competitors won a title, Vincent Richards and Howard Kinsey in the men's doubles.

== Finals ==
=== Men's singles ===
(France) Henri Cochet defeated (France) René Lacoste, 6–2, 6–4, 6–3

=== Women's singles ===
(France) Suzanne Lenglen defeated (United States) Mary Browne, 6–1, 6–0

=== Men's doubles ===
(United States) Vincent Richards / (United States) Howard Kinsey defeated (France) Henri Cochet / (France) Jacques Brugnon, 6–4, 6–1, 4–6, 6–4

=== Women's doubles ===
(France) Suzanne Lenglen / (France) Julie Vlasto defeated (United Kingdom) Evelyn Colyer / (United Kingdom) Kitty McKane, 6–1, 6–1

=== Mixed doubles ===
(France) Suzanne Lenglen / (France) Jacques Brugnon defeated (France) Nanette le Besnerais / (France) Jean Borotra, 6–4, 6–3

Preceded by 1926 Australasian Championships	Grand Slams	Succeeded by 1926 Wimbledon Championships
