= 1925 French Championships (tennis) =

- Date: 28 May – 6 June 1925
- Edition: 30th / 1st Grand Slam
- Category: Grand Slam
- Surface: Clay
- Location: Saint-Cloud, France
- Venue: Stade Français

Champions

Men's singles
- (France) René Lacoste

Women's singles
- (France) Suzanne Lenglen

Men's doubles
- (France) Jean Borotra / (France) René Lacoste

Women's doubles
- (France) Suzanne Lenglen / (France) Julie Vlasto

Mixed doubles
- (France) Suzanne Lenglen / (France) Jacques Brugnon
← 1924 ·	French Championships	· 1926 →

The 1925 French Championships (now known as the French Open) was a tennis tournament that took place on the outdoor clay courts at the Stade Français at La Faisanderie in the Parc de Saint-Cloud in Paris, France. The tournament ran from 28 May until 6 June 1925. It was the 30th staging of the French Championships but the first time it was staged as a Grand Slam event, open to amateur players who were neither French citizens nor residents of France. It was the second Grand Slam tournament of the year after the Australasian Championships.

The tournament was organized by Stade Français and Racing Club de France. Play on the first day was canceled due to bad weather.

Suzanne Lenglen won all three events she entered; singles, doubles, and the mixed doubles and al titles were won by French players.

== Finals ==
=== Men's singles ===
(France) René Lacoste defeated (France) Jean Borotra, 7–5, 6–1, 6–4

=== Women's singles ===
(France) Suzanne Lenglen defeated (United Kingdom) Kitty McKane, 6–1, 6–2

=== Men's doubles ===
(France) Jean Borotra / (France) René Lacoste defeated (France) Henri Cochet / (France) Jacques Brugnon, 7–5, 4–6, 6–3, 2–6, 6–3

=== Women's doubles ===
(France) Suzanne Lenglen / (France) Julie Vlasto defeated (United Kingdom) Evelyn Colyer / (United Kingdom) Kitty McKane, 6–1, 9–11, 6–2

=== Mixed doubles ===
(France) Suzanne Lenglen / (France) Jacques Brugnon defeated (France) Julie Vlasto / (France) Henri Cochet, 6–2, 6–2

Preceded by 1925 Australasian Championships	Grand Slams	Succeeded by 1925 Wimbledon Championships
