= Domini Crosfield =

British politician and tennis player

Domini Crosfield in 1929

Domini Crosfield, Lady Crosfield (1884 – 15 January 1963), was a British Liberal Party politician and tennis player.

== Background ==
Born Domini Elliadi in Lancashire, she was the daughter of Elie M. Elliadi (1843–1928), a Greek merchant from Smyrnia, and Marie Homer (1863–1924). In 1907 she married Arthur Crosfield, Liberal MP for Warrington, 1906–1910. When her husband was created a baronet in 1915 she became Lady Crosfield.

== Career ==
During World War One, Lady Crosfield was Honorary Adviser on Exhibitions and Art to the Greek Department of Information. From 1915-19 she was Commandant of two VAD hospices. She was actively involved in the running of the North Islington Infant Welfare Centre and School for Mothers. In 1919 she became President of the centre, a position she would hold until 1959. She was Founder and Chairman of Pediki Steghi (Day Nurseries) and of Music for Children in Greece. She was a Member of Council, for the Imperial Society of Teachers of Dancing. She was a Member of the Grants Committee of the National Playing Fields Association. She was a Member of the Executive of the Children's Playground Committee. She was a Member of the Executive of National Association of Maternity and Child Welfare. She was a Member of the Executive and Chairman of the Standing Committee of the Anglo-Hellenic League. She was Vice-President and Director of the London Philharmonic Society. She was Vice-President of the National Playing Fields Association and a member of the Grants and Children’s Playground Sub-Committee.

== Political career ==
At a parliamentary General Election she contested, as a Liberal party candidate Islington North in 1929;

General Election 30 May 1929: Islington North
Party	Candidate	Votes	%	±%
Labour	Robert Stanley Young	18,272	41.8	+6.5
Conservative	Gordon Cosmo Touche	15,207	34.8	−9.6
Liberal	Domini Crosfield, Lady Crosfield	10,210	23.4	+3.1
Majority		3,065	7.0	−2.1
Turnout			68.0	−4.2
Labour gain from Conservative		Swing	+8.0	

She did not stand for parliament again. In 1938, she was awarded the Golden Cross of the Order of George I (Greece). She was made a Commander of the Order of the Phoenix (Greece) and the Diploma of Commander of Order of Welfare (Greece).

She was a championship tennis player, and at her home in Witanhurst she hosted her own charity tennis competition immediately after the Wimbledon fortnight, with many of the championship players staying on in London for the event. For the 1906 Intercalated Games, Domini Elliadis entered the Women's singles but did not start at the event.
