= Julie Vlasto =

French tennis player

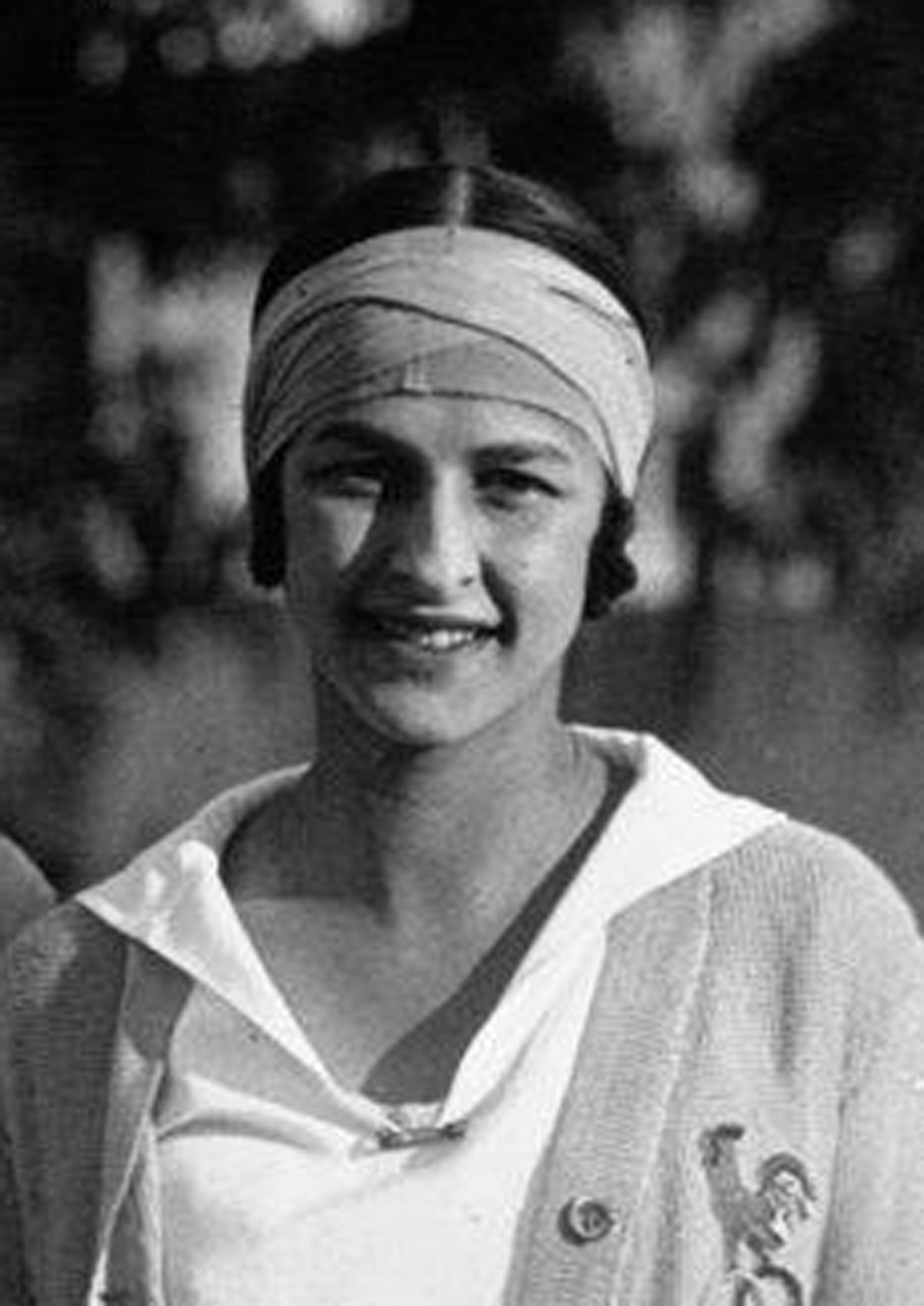
- Full name: Pénélope Julie Vlasto Serpieri
- Country (sports): France
- Born: 8 August 1903 Marseille, France
- Died: 2 March 1985 (aged 81) Lausanne, Switzerland
- Plays: Right-handed (one-handed backhand)

Singles
- Highest ranking: No. 8 (1923)

Grand Slam singles results
- French Open: SF (1925)
- Wimbledon: SF (1926)

Doubles

Grand Slam doubles results
- French Open: W (1925, 1926)

Grand Slam mixed doubles results
- French Open: F (1925)
Medal record
Olympic Games – Tennis
Silver medal – second place	1924 Paris	Singles

Pénélope Julie "Diddie" Vlasto Serpieri (French pronunciation: [ʒyli vlastɔ] Greek: Πηνελόπη-Ιουλία Βλαστού-Σερπιέρη; 8 August 1903 – 2 March 1985) was a female tennis player from France. She won the silver medal at the Paris Olympics in 1924 in women's singles, losing the final to the American Helen Wills Moody. Vlasto also won the version of the French national championships in 1924 that was open only to French nationals. She was a doubles partner of Suzanne Lenglen in many women's doubles tournaments during the early 1920s.

She was born as Pénélope Julie Vlasto on 8 August 1903, in Marseille, France.Both her parents were from Greece. Vlastos' family hails from Constantinople, and later settled in Chios

According to Wallis Myers of the Daily Telegraph and Daily Mail, Vlasto was ranked in the world top ten in 1923 and 1926, reaching a career high of world No. 8 in 1923.

She married Jean-Baptiste Serpieri on 17 February 1927, and they had 3 children. Her son Freddy was an equestrian, and he had one daughter from his relationship with the famous Greek singer Marinella

== Grand Slam finals ==
=== Doubles (2 titles) ===
Result	Year	Championship	Surface	Partner	Opponents	Score
Win	1925	French Championships	Clay	(France) Suzanne Lenglen	(United Kingdom) Kitty McKane (United Kingdom) Evelyn Colyer	6–1, 9–11, 6–2
Win	1926	French Championships	Clay	(France) Suzanne Lenglen	(United Kingdom) Kitty McKane (United Kingdom) Evelyn Colyer	6–1, 6–1

=== Mixed doubles (1 runner-up) ===
Result	Year	Championship	Surface	Partner	Opponents	Score
Loss	1925	French Championships	Clay	(France) Henri Cochet	(France) Suzanne Lenglen (France) Jacques Brugnon	2–6, 2–6

== Grand Slam singles tournament timeline ==
Key
W	F	SF	QF	#R	RR	Q#	DNQ	A	NH

(W) winner; (F) finalist; (SF) semifinalist; (QF) quarterfinalist; (#R) rounds 4, 3, 2, 1; (RR) round-robin stage; (Q#) qualification round; (DNQ) did not qualify; (A) absent; (NH) not held; (SR) strike rate (events won / competed); (W–L) win–loss record.

Tournament	1923	1924	1925	1926	1927	1928	1929	1930	1931	Career SR
Australia	A	A	A	A	A	A	A	A	A	0 / 0
France^{1}	QF	NH	SF	2R	A	A	A	A	1R	0 / 4
Wimbledon	4R	A	A	SF	A	A	2R	1R	A	0 / 4
United States	A	A	A	A	A	A	A	A	A	0 / 0
SR	0 / 2	0 / 0	0 / 1	0 / 2	0 / 0	0 / 0	0 / 1	0 / 1	0 / 1	0 / 8

^{1}Through 1923, the French Championships were open only to French nationals. The World Hard Court Championships (WHCC), actually played on clay in Paris or Brussels, began in 1912 and were open to all nationalities. The results from that tournament are shown here for 1923. The Olympics replaced the WHCC in 1924, as the Olympics were held in Paris. Beginning in 1925, the French Championships were open to all nationalities, with the results shown here beginning with that year.

== See also ==
- Performance timelines for all female tennis players since 1978 who reached at least one Grand Slam or Olympic singles final
