= 1926 Wimbledon Championships =

- Date: 21 June – 3 July
- Edition: 46th
- Category: Grand Slam
- Surface: Grass
- Location: Church Road; SW19, Wimbledon, London, United Kingdom
- Venue: All England Lawn Tennis and Croquet Club

Champions

Men's singles
- (France) Jean Borotra

Women's singles
- (United Kingdom) Kitty Godfree

Men's doubles
- (France) Jacques Brugnon / (France) Henri Cochet

Women's doubles
- (United States) Mary Browne / (United States) Elizabeth Ryan

Mixed doubles
- (United Kingdom) Leslie Godfree / (United Kingdom) Kitty Godfree
- Wimbledon Championships

The 1926 Wimbledon Championships, also known as the Jubilee Championships, took place on the outdoor grass courts at the All England Lawn Tennis and Croquet Club in Wimbledon, London, United Kingdom. The tournament ran from 21 June until 3 July. It was the 46th staging of the Wimbledon Championships, and the third Grand Slam tennis event of 1926.

This championship is notable for having The Duke of York, the future King George VI competing with his mentor and advisor Louis Greig in the men's doubles. The pair were eliminated in the first round by former champions Herbert Roper Barrett and Arthur Gore.

== Finals ==
=== Men's singles ===
(France) Jean Borotra defeated (United States) Howard Kinsey, 8–6, 6–1, 6–3

=== Women's singles ===
(United Kingdom) Kitty Godfree defeated (Spain) Lilí de Álvarez, 6–2, 4–6, 6–3

=== Men's doubles ===
(France) Jacques Brugnon / (France) Henri Cochet defeated (United States) Howard Kinsey / (United States) Vincent Richards, 7–5, 4–6, 6–3, 6–2

=== Women's doubles ===
(United States) Mary Browne / (United States) Elizabeth Ryan defeated (United Kingdom) Kitty Godfree / (United Kingdom) Evelyn Colyer, 6–1, 6–1

=== Mixed doubles ===
(United Kingdom) Leslie Godfree (Note: The Godfrees are the only married couple to have won the mixed doubles title.) / (United Kingdom) Kitty Godfree defeated (United States) Howard Kinsey / (United States) Mary Browne, 6–3, 6–4

== Notes ==
Preceded by 1926 French Championships	Grand Slams	Succeeded by 1926 U.S. National Championships
