= Kathleen McKane Godfree =

British badminton and tennis player

Kitty McKane Godfree
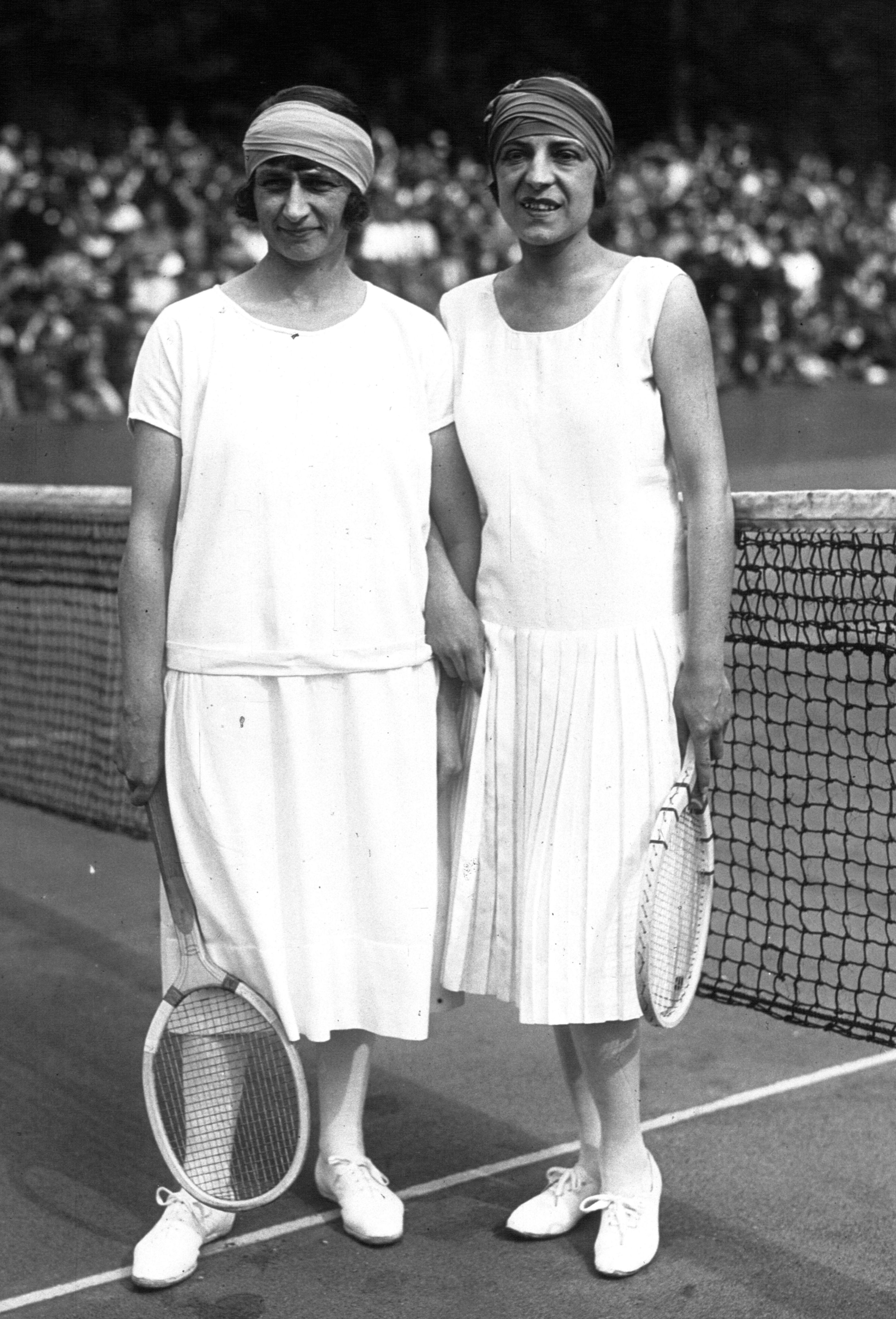
- Kathleen McKane Godfree (left) and Suzanne Lenglen at the French Championships in 1925
- Full name: Kathleen McKane Godfree
- Country (sports): Great Britain
- Born: 7 May 1896 Bayswater, England
- Died: 19 June 1992 (aged 96) London, England
- Plays: Right-handed
- Int. Tennis HoF: 1978 (member page)

Singles
- Highest ranking: No.2 (1923, 1924, 1926)

Grand Slam singles results
- French Open: F (1923, 1925)
- Wimbledon: W (1924, 1926)
- US Open: F (1925)

Grand Slam doubles results
- French Open: F (1925, 1926)
- Wimbledon: F (1922, 1924, 1926)
- US Open: W (1923, 1927)

Grand Slam mixed doubles results
- Wimbledon: W (1924, 1926)
- US Open: W (1925)

Team competitions
- Wightman Cup: (1924, 1925)
Medal record
Olympic Games – Tennis
Gold medal – first place	1920 Antwerp	Doubles
Silver medal – second place	1920 Antwerp	Mixed Doubles
Silver medal – second place	1924 Paris	Doubles
Bronze medal – third place	1920 Antwerp	Singles
Bronze medal – third place	1924 Paris	Singles

Kathleen "Kitty" McKane Godfree (née McKane; 7 May 1896 – 19 June 1992) was a British tennis and badminton player and the second most decorated female British Olympian, joint with Katherine Grainger.

== Career ==
According to A. Wallis Myers of The Daily Telegraph and the Daily Mail, Godfree was ranked in the world top 10 from 1921 (when the rankings began) through 1927, reaching a career high of world No. 2 in these rankings in 1923, 1924, and 1926.

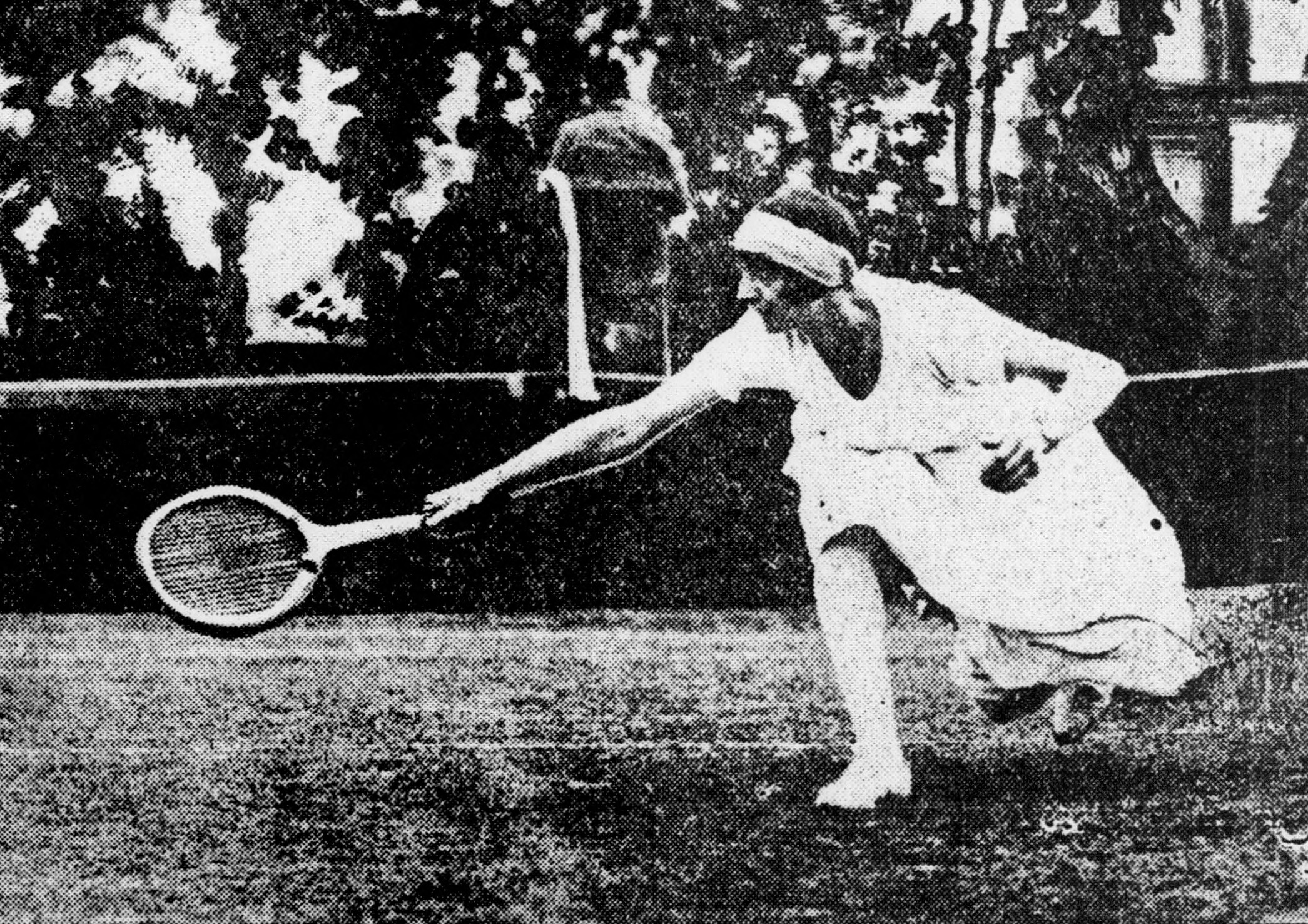
Playing in 1923

Godfree won five Olympic medals in tennis at the 1920 Antwerp and 1924 Paris games, the most Olympic medals won by a tennis player until Venus Williams matched this record at the 2016 Olympic Games. In 1923, she captured the title at the World Covered Court Championships.

Godfree won the Wimbledon singles title twice. In the 1924 final, Godfree recovered from a set and 4–1 (40–15) down against Helen Wills to win the title. This was the only defeat at Wimbledon for Wills who later won eight titles. In the 1926 final, Godfree recovered from a 3–1 and game-point-against deficit in the third set to defeat Lili de Alvarez.

The 1924 Wimbledon final was not Godfree's only victory over Wills. Godfree also defeated Wills during the 1924 Wightman Cup 6–2, 6–2. On at least two other occasions, Godfree pushed Wills to the limit. Wills won their quarterfinal in the 1923 U.S. Championships 2–6, 6–2, 7–5 after Godfree recovered to 5–5 in the third set after trailing 5–2. In the final of the 1925 U.S. Championships, Wills won in three sets.

In 1925, Godfree became the first person to have reached the singles finals of the French Championships, Wimbledon, and U.S. Championships during her career.

In 1922, Kitty and her sister Margaret McKane Stocks were the only sisters to contest a Wimbledon doubles final (until Serena and Venus Williams reached the final in 2000), losing to Suzanne Lenglen and Elizabeth Ryan 6–0, 6–4.

Godfree's lifetime record at Wimbledon was 38–11 in singles, 33–12 in women's doubles, and 40–12 in mixed doubles.

Godfree received a Centenary medallion on Wimbledon's Centre Court in 1977. She presented the winner's trophy to Martina Navratilova in 1986, in honour of the centenary year of play at Wimbledon. Godfree was inducted into the International Tennis Hall of Fame in 1978.

In badminton, Godfree won eight All England Open Badminton Championships from 1920 through 1925, considered the unofficial World Badminton Championships until 1977.

She was the subject of This Is Your Life in 1987 when she was surprised by Eamonn Andrews while shopping in a supermarket in East Sheen.

Godfree died on 19 June 1992 at the age of 96.

Godfree's name lives on in Wimbledon at Kathleen Godfree Court, a later-living development that she opened on 25 July 1989.

In 2025 the Museum of Richmond included her in their exhibition "Trailblazing Women – Richmond’s Sporting Superstars".

== Grand Slam finals ==
=== Singles: 5 (2 titles, 3 runners-up) ===
Result	Year	Championship	Surface	Opponent	Score
Loss	1923	Wimbledon	Grass	(France) Suzanne Lenglen	2–6, 2–6
Win	1924	Wimbledon	Grass	(United States) Helen Wills	4–6, 6–4, 6–4
Loss	1925	French Championships	Clay	(France) Suzanne Lenglen	1–6, 2–6
Loss	1925	U.S. National Championships	Grass	(United States) Helen Wills	6–3, 0–6, 2–6
Win	1926	Wimbledon	Grass	(Spain) Lilí de Álvarez	6–2, 4–6, 6–3

=== Doubles: 7 (2 titles, 5 runners-up) ===
Result	Year	Championship	Surface	Partner	Opponents	Score
Loss	1922	Wimbledon	Grass	(United Kingdom) Margaret McKane Stocks	(France) Suzanne Lenglen (United States) Elizabeth Ryan	0–6, 4–6
Win	1923	U.S. National Championships	Grass	(United Kingdom) Phyllis Howkins Covell	(United States) Eleanor Goss (United States) Hazel Hotchkiss Wightman	2–6, 6–2, 6–1
Loss	1924	Wimbledon	Grass	(United Kingdom) Phyllis Howkins Covell	(United States) Hazel Hotchkiss Wightman (United States) Helen Wills	4–6, 4–6
Loss	1925	French Championships	Clay	(United Kingdom) Evelyn Colyer	(France) Suzanne Lenglen (France) Julie Vlasto	1–6, 11–9, 2–6
Loss	1926	French Championships	Clay	(United Kingdom) Evelyn Colyer	(France) Suzanne Lenglen (France) Julie Vlasto	1–6, 1–6
Loss	1926	Wimbledon	Grass	(United Kingdom) Evelyn Colyer	(United States) Mary Browne (United States) Elizabeth Ryan	1–6, 1–6
Win	1927	U.S. National Championships	Grass	(United Kingdom) Ermyntrude Harvey	(United Kingdom) Joan Fry (United Kingdom) Betty Nuthall	6–1, 4–6, 6–4

=== Mixed doubles: 5 (3 titles, 2 runners-up) ===
Result	Year	Championship	Surface	Partner	Opponents	Score
Loss	1923	U.S. National Championships	Grass	(Australia) John Hawkes	(United States) Molla Bjurstedt Mallory (United States) Bill Tilden	3–6, 6–2, 8–10
Win	1924	Wimbledon	Grass	(United Kingdom) Brian Gilbert	(United Kingdom) Dorothy Shepherd (United Kingdom) Leslie Godfree	6–3, 3–6, 6–3
Win	1925	U.S. National Championships	Grass	(Australia) John Hawkes	(United Kingdom) Ermyntrude Harvey (United States) Vincent Richards	6–2, 6–4
Win	1926	Wimbledon	Grass	(United Kingdom) Leslie Godfree	(United States) Mary Browne (United States) Howard Kinsey	6–3, 6–4
Loss	1927	Wimbledon	Grass	(United Kingdom) Leslie Godfree	(United States) Elizabeth Ryan (United States) Frank Hunter	6–8, 0–6

== Grand Slam singles tournament timeline ==
Key
W	F	SF	QF	#R	RR	Q#	DNQ	A	NH

(W) winner; (F) finalist; (SF) semifinalist; (QF) quarterfinalist; (#R) rounds 4, 3, 2, 1; (RR) round-robin stage; (Q#) qualification round; (DNQ) did not qualify; (A) absent; (NH) not held; (SR) strike rate (events won / competed); (W–L) win–loss record.

Tournament	1919	1920	1921	1922	1923	1924	1925	1926	1927	1928	1929	1930	1931	1932	1933	1934	Career SR
Australia	NH	NH	NH	A	A	A	A	A	A	A	A	A	A	A	A	A	0 / 0
France^{1}	NH	A	A	SF	F	NH	F	QF	A	A	A	A	A	A	A	A	0 / 4
Wimbledon	QF	3R	2R	2R	F	W	SF	W	QF	A	A	A	4R	4R	2R	3R	2 / 13
United States	A	A	A	A	QF	A	F	A	1R	A	A	A	A	A	A	A	0 / 3
SR	0 / 1	0 / 1	0 / 1	0 / 2	0 / 3	1 / 1	0 / 3	1 / 2	0 / 2	0 / 0	0 / 0	0 / 0	0 / 1	0 / 1	0 / 1	0 / 1	2 / 20

^{1}Through 1923, the French Championships were open only to French nationals and foreigners who had membership with a French tennis club. The World Hard Court Championships (WHCC), actually played on clay in Paris or Brussels, began in 1912 and were open to all nationalities. The results from that tournament are shown here from 1920 through 1923. The Olympics replaced the WHCC in 1924, as the Olympics were held in Paris. Beginning in 1925, the French Championships were open to all nationalities, with the results shown here beginning with that year.

== Husband ==
Kitty and her husband Leslie remain the only married couple to have won the mixed doubles championship at Wimbledon, winning the title in 1926. Kitty has also been referred to as Mrs. L. A. Godfree on sportscards and in reference material.

== See also ==
- Performance timelines for all female tennis players since 1978 who reached at least one Grand Slam final
