= Evelyn Colyer =

British tennis player

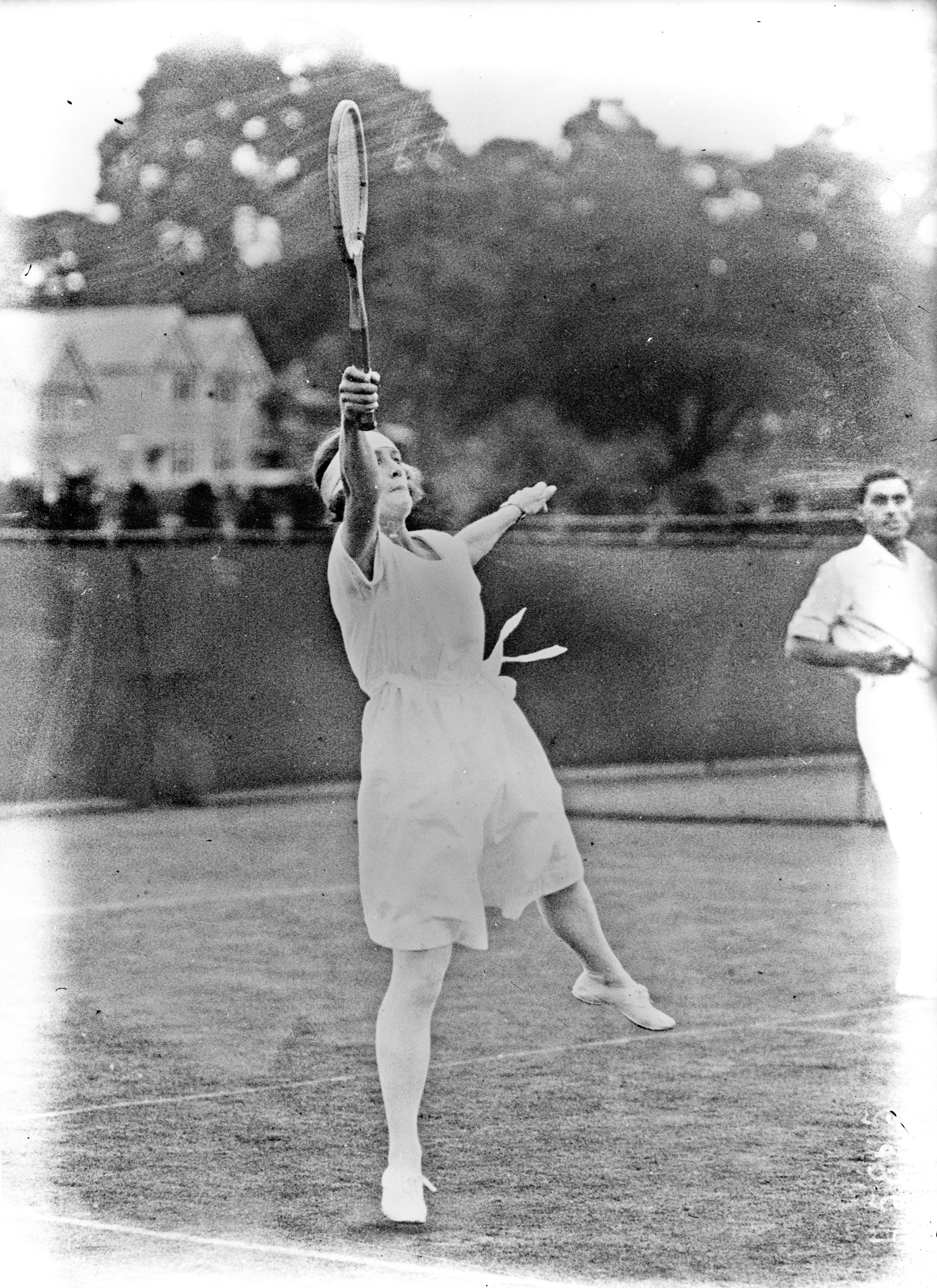
- Full name: Evelyn Lucy Colyer Munro
- Country (sports): Great Britain
- Born: 16 August 1902; Wandsworth, England
- Died: 6 November 1930 (aged 28); Bishnath, British India
- Retired: 1930

Singles

Grand Slam singles results
- French Open: QF (1925)
- Wimbledon: 4R (1927)

Doubles

Grand Slam doubles results
- French Open: F (1925, 1926)
- Wimbledon: F (1923, 1926)

Grand Slam mixed doubles results
- French Open: 2R (1928)

Team competitions
- Wightman Cup: W (1924, 1925)
Medal record
Olympic Games
Bronze medal – third place	1924 Paris	Doubles

Evelyn Lucy Colyer (later Munro, 16 August 1902 – 4 November 1930) was a female tennis player from Great Britain. With Joan Austin, sister of Bunny Austin, Colyer played doubles in the 1923 Wimbledon final against Suzanne Lenglen and Elizabeth Ryan. Colyer and Austin were known in the British press as "The Babes." At the 1924 Paris Olympics, she teamed with Dorothy Shepherd-Barron to win a bronze medal in the women's doubles event.

From 1920 until 1929, she competed in all editions of the Wimbledon Championships. Her best singles result was reaching the fourth round in 1927 in which she was defeated by Kitty Godfree.

In 1925, she teamed with P.B.D Spence and won the mixed doubles title at the Queen's Club Covered Courts Championships.

She was part of the winning British Wightman Cup team in 1924 and 1925 as well as the team that lost in 1926.

On 13 February 1930 she married Hamish Munro, a tea planter from Assam, British India and soon afterward, the couple migrated to Assam. She died on 6 November 1930 of complications after giving birth to twins on 20 October.

== Grand Slam finals ==
=== Doubles (4 runners-up) ===
Result	Year	Championship	Partner	Opponents	Score
Loss	1923	Wimbledon	(United Kingdom) Joan Austin	(France) Suzanne Lenglen (United States) Elizabeth Ryan	3–6, 1–6
Loss	1925	French Championships	(United Kingdom) Kitty McKane	(France) Suzanne Lenglen (France) Julie Vlasto	1–6, 11–9, 2–6
Loss	1926	French Championships	(United Kingdom) Kitty McKane	(France) Suzanne Lenglen (France) Julie Vlasto	1–6, 1–6
Loss	1926	Wimbledon	(United Kingdom) Kitty McKane	(United States) Mary Kendall Browne (United Kingdom) Randolph Lycett	1–6, 1–6
