= 1922 in tennis =

This page covers all the important events in the sport of tennis in 1922. It provides the results of notable tournaments throughout the year on both the men's and women's ILTF tennis circuits.

== Australian Open ==
| Category | Champion(s) | Finalist(s) | Score |
|---|---|---|---|
| Men's singles | (Australia) James Anderson | (Australia) Gerald Patterson | 6–0, 3–6, 3–6, 6–3, 6–2 |
| Women's singles | (Australia) Margaret Molesworth | (Australia) Esna Boyd | 6–3, 10–8 |
| Men's doubles | (Australia) Jack Hawkes (Australia) Gerald Patterson | (Australia) James Anderson (Australia) Norman Peach | 8–10, 6–0, 6–0, 7–5 |
| Women's doubles | (Australia) Esna Boyd Robertson (Australia) Marjorie Mountain | (Australia) Floris St. George (Australia) Gwen Utz | 1–6, 6–4, 7–5 |
| Mixed doubles | (Australia) Esna Boyd Robertson (Australia) Jack Hawkes | (Australia) Gwen Utz (Australia) Harold Utz | 6–1, 6–1 |

== French Open ==
Not a Grand Slam event.

== Wimbledon ==
| Category | Champion(s) | Finalist(s) | Score |
|---|---|---|---|
| Men's singles | (Australia) Gerald Patterson | (United Kingdom) Randolph Lycett | 6–3, 6–4, 6–2 |
| Women's singles | (France) Suzanne Lenglen | (United States) Molla Mallory | 6–2, 6–0 |
| Men's doubles | (Australia) James Anderson (United Kingdom) Randolph Lycett | (Australia) Gerald Patterson (Australia) Pat O'Hara Wood | 3–6, 7–9, 6–4, 6–3, 11–9 |
| Women's doubles | (France) Suzanne Lenglen (United States) Elizabeth Ryan | (United Kingdom) Kitty McKane (United Kingdom) Margaret Stocks | 6–0, 6–4 |
| Mixed doubles | (Australia) Pat O'Hara Wood (France) Suzanne Lenglen | (United Kingdom) Randolph Lycett (United States) Elizabeth Ryan | 6–4, 6–3 |

== US Open ==
| Category | Champion(s) | Finalist(s) | Score |
|---|---|---|---|
| Men's singles | (United States) Bill Tilden | (United States) Bill Johnston | 4–6, 3–6, 6–2, 6–3, 6–4 |
| Women's singles | (United States) Molla Mallory | (United States) Helen Wills | 6–3, 6–1 |
| Men's doubles | (United States) Bill Tilden (United States) Vincent Richards | (Australia) Gerald Patterson (Australia) Pat O'Hara Wood | 4–6, 6–1, 6–3, 6–4 |
| Women's doubles | (United States) Marion Zinderstein (United States) Helen Wills | (United States) Edith Sigourney (United States) Molla Mallory | 6–4, 7–9, 6–3 |
| Mixed doubles | (United States) Molla Mallory (United States) Bill Tilden | (United States) Helen Wills (United States) Howard Kinsey | 6–4, 6–3 |
