= Suzanne Lenglen career statistics =

This is a list of the main career statistics of professional French tennis player Suzanne Lenglen.

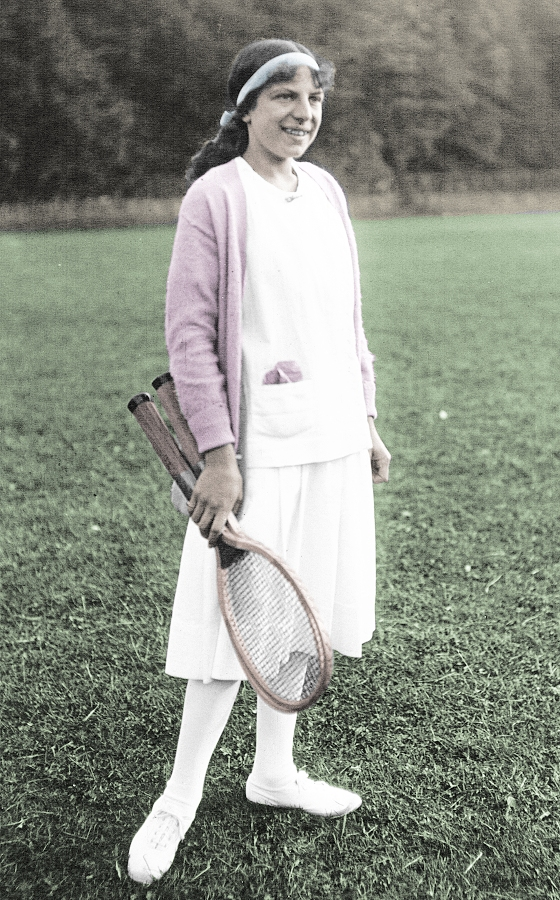
Suzanne Lenglen in 1914

== Grand Slam tournament finals ==
=== Singles: 8 finals (8 titles) ===
Result	Year	Championship	Surface	Opponent	Score
Win	1919	Wimbledon	Grass	(United Kingdom) Dorothea Lambert Chambers	10–8, 4–6, 9–7
Win	1920	Wimbledon (2)	Grass	(United Kingdom) Dorothea Lambert Chambers	6–3, 6–0
Win	1921	Wimbledon (3)	Grass	(United States) Elizabeth Ryan	6–2, 6–0
Win	1922	Wimbledon (4)	Grass	(United States) Molla Mallory	6–2, 6–0
Win	1923	Wimbledon (5)	Grass	(United Kingdom) Kathleen McKane	6–2, 6–2
Win	1925	French Championships	Clay	(United Kingdom) Kathleen McKane	6–1, 6–2
Win	1925	Wimbledon (6)	Grass	(United Kingdom) Joan Fry	6–2, 6–0
Win	1926	French Championships (2)	Clay	(United States) Mary Browne	6–1, 6–0

=== Doubles: 8 finals (8 titles) ===
Result	Year	Championship	Surface	Partner	Opponents	Score
Win	1919	Wimbledon	Grass	(United States) Elizabeth Ryan	(United Kingdom) Dorothea Lambert Chambers (United Kingdom) Ethel Thomson Larcombe	4–6, 7–5, 6–3
Win	1920	Wimbledon (2)	Grass	(United States) Elizabeth Ryan	(United Kingdom) Dorothea Lambert Chambers (United Kingdom) Ethel Thomson Larcombe	6–4, 6–0
Win	1921	Wimbledon (3)	Grass	(United States) Elizabeth Ryan	(United Kingdom) Geraldine Beamish (South Africa) Irene Peacock	6–1, 6–2
Win	1922	Wimbledon (4)	Grass	(United States) Elizabeth Ryan	(United Kingdom) Kathleen McKane Godfree (United Kingdom) Margaret McKane Stocks	6–0, 6–4
Win	1923	Wimbledon (5)	Grass	(United States) Elizabeth Ryan	(United Kingdom) Joan Austin (United Kingdom) Evelyn Colyer	6–3, 6–1
Win	1925	French Championships	Clay	(France) Julie Vlasto	(United Kingdom) Evelyn Colyer (United Kingdom) Kathleen McKane Godfree	6–1, 9–11, 6–2
Win	1925	Wimbledon (6)	Grass	(United States) Elizabeth Ryan	(United Kingdom) Kathleen Bridge (United Kingdom) Mary McIlquham	6–2, 6–2
Win	1926	French Championships (2)	Clay	(France) Julie Vlasto	(United Kingdom) Evelyn Colyer (United Kingdom) Kathleen McKane Godfree	6–1, 6–1

=== Mixed doubles: 5 finals (5 titles) ===
Result	Year	Championship	Surface	Partner	Opponents	Score
Win	1920	Wimbledon	Grass	(Australia) Gerald Patterson	(United States) Elizabeth Ryan (United Kingdom) Randolph Lycett	7–5, 6–3
Win	1922	Wimbledon (2)	Grass	(Australia) Pat O'Hara Wood	(United Kingdom) Randolph Lycett (United States) Elizabeth Ryan	6–4, 6–3
Win	1925	French Championships	Clay	(France) Jacques Brugnon	(France) Henri Cochet (France) Didi Vlasto	6–2, 6–2
Win	1925	Wimbledon (3)	Grass	(France) Jean Borotra	(Italy) Umberto de Morpurgo (United States) Elizabeth Ryan	6–3, 6–3
Win	1926	French Championships (2)	Clay	(France) Jacques Brugnon	(France) Nanette le Besnerais (France) Jean Borotra	6–4, 6–3

== World Hard Court Championships ==
=== Singles: 4 finals (4 titles) ===
Result	Year	Championship	Surface	Opponent	Score
Win	1914	World Hard Court Championships	Clay	(France) Germaine Golding	6–3, 6–2
Win	1921	World Hard Court Championships (2)	Clay	(United States) Molla Mallory	6–2, 6–3
Win	1922	World Hard Court Championships (3)	Clay	(United States) Elizabeth Ryan	6–3, 6–2
Win	1923	World Hard Court Championships (4)	Clay	(United Kingdom) Kathleen McKane	6–2, 6–3

=== Doubles: 4 finals (3 titles, 1 runner-up) ===
Result	Year	Championship	Surface	Partner	Opponents	Score
Win	1914	World Hard Court Championships	Clay	(United States) Elizabeth Ryan	(France) Blanche Amblard (France) Suzanne Amblard	6–0, 6–0
Win	1921	World Hard Court Championships (2)	Clay	(France) Germaine Golding	(United Kingdom) Dorothy Holman (South Africa) Irene Peacock	6–2, 6–2
Win	1922	World Hard Court Championships (3)	Clay	(United States) Elizabeth Ryan	(United Kingdom) Winifred Beamish (United Kingdom) Kitty McKane	6–0, 6–4
Loss	1923	World Hard Court Championships	Clay	(France) Germaine Golding	(United Kingdom) Winifred Beamish (United Kingdom) Kitty McKane	2–6, 3–6

=== Mixed doubles: 4 finals (3 titles, 1 runner-up) ===
Result	Year	Championship	Surface	Partner	Opponents	Score
Loss	1914	World Hard Court Championships	Clay	(Austria) Ludwig von Salm-Hoogstraeten	(France) Max Decugis (United States) Elizabeth Ryan	3–6, 1–6
Win	1921	World Hard Court Championships	Clay	(France) Max Decugis	(France) William Laurentz (France) Germaine Golding	6–3, 6–2
Win	1922	World Hard Court Championships (2)	Clay	(France) Henri Cochet	(United Kingdom) Brian Gilbert (United Kingdom) Geraldine Beamish	6–4, 4–6, 6–0
Win	1923	World Hard Court Championships (2)	Clay	(France) Henri Cochet	(United Kingdom) Brian Gilbert (United Kingdom) Kitty McKane	6–2, 10–8

== Olympic finals ==
=== Singles: 1 final (1 gold medal) ===
Result	Year	Championship	Surface	Opponent	Score
Gold	1920	Antwerp Olympics	Clay	(United Kingdom) Edith Holman	6–3, 6–0

=== Mixed doubles: 1 final (1 gold medal) ===
Result	Year	Championship	Surface	Partner	Opponents	Score
Gold	1920	Antwerp Olympics	Clay	(France) Max Decugis	(United Kingdom) Kathleen McKane Godfree (United Kingdom) Max Woosnam	6–4, 6–2

- note - Suzanne Lenglen also won a bronze medal in women's doubles, partnering Élisabeth d'Ayen.

== Career finals ==
=== Singles: (83 titles) ===
Winner — Legend Grand Slam tournaments (8–0) Summer Olympics (1–0) WHCC (4–0) Other tournaments (70–6)	Titles by surface Hard (0–0) Grass (6–0) Clay (77–6)

Result	Date	Tournament	Location	Surface	Opponent	Score
Win	May, 1913	Picardy Tournament	Compiegne, France	Clay	(France) Mlle L Marcot	?
Win	June 22, 1913	Lille Tournament	Lille, France	Clay	(United Kingdom) Beatrice Butler	6–1, 6–1
Loss	July 12, 1913	Chantilly Tournament	Chantilly, France	Clay	(France) Jeanne Matthey	5–7, 1–6
Loss	July 16, 1913	Compiegne Tournament	Compiegne, France	Clay	(France) Jeanne Matthey	default
Win	August 29, 1913	Wimeraux Tournament	Wimeraux, France	Clay	(United Kingdom) Blanche Colston	4–6, 9–7, 3–2 retired
Win	September 13, 1913	Le Touquet Tournament	Le Touquet, France	Clay	(United Kingdom) Blanche Colston	6–0, 2–6, 6–1
Win	January 4, 1914	Cannes New Year Tournament	Cannes, France	Clay	(France) M. Ward	6–0, 6–0
Win	January 11, 1914	Cannes Carlton Club	Cannes, France	Clay	(United Kingdom) Ruth Winch	7–5, 3–-6, 6–1
Win	April 12, 1914	Cannes Carlton Club II	Cannes, France	Clay	(United States) Elizabeth Ryan	6–3, 3–6, 6–2
Loss	May 23, 1914	French Championships	Paris, France	Clay	(France) Marguerite Broquedis	7–5, 4–6, 3–6
Win	June 9, 1914	World Hard Court Championships	Paris, France	Clay	(France) Germaine Golding	6–2, 6–1
Win	June 15, 1914	Lille Tournament	Lille, France	Clay	(United Kingdom) Beatrice Butler	6–0, 6–0
Win	June 21, 1914	Amiens Tournament	Amiens, France	Clay	(France) Mlle Vienne	6–2, 6–0
Loss	July 25, 1914	Compiegne Tournament	Compiegne, France	Clay	(France) Suzanne Amblard	default
Win	March 2, 1919	Cannes Carlton Tournament	Cannes, France	Clay	(France) Doris Wolfson	6–1, 6–1
Win	March 9, 1919	La Festa Tournament	Monte Carlo, Monaco	Clay	(France) Doris Wolfson	6–0, 6–0
Win	March 16, 1919	Riviera Championship	Menton, France	Clay	(France) A Doublet	6–0, 6–1
Win	March 25, 1919	South of France Championships	Nice, France	Clay	(France) Doris Wolfson	6–0, 6–0
Win	March 30, 1919	Cannes Beau Site Hotel	Cannes, France	Clay	(France) Elizabeth D'Ayen	6–0, 6–0
Win	May 25, 1919	Paris Championship	Paris, France	Clay	(France) Jeanne Vaussard	6–0, 6–1
Win	July 5, 1919	Wimbledon	London, UK	Grass	(United Kingdom) Dorothea Lambert Chambers	10–8, 4–6, 9–7
Loss	August 11, 1919	Cabourg Tournament	Cabourg, France	Clay	(France) Blanche Amblard	default
Win	August 30, 1919	Deauville Tournament	Deauville, France	Clay	(France) Marguerite Broquedis	6–1, 6–3
Win	September 13, 1919	Le Touquet Tournament	Le Touquet, France	Clay	(United Kingdom) Madeline O'Neill	6–0, 6–1
Win	January 11, 1920	Cannes New Year Tournament	Cannes, France	Clay	(United Kingdom) Madeline O'Neill	6–1, 6–0
Win	January 18, 1920	Cannes Carlton Club	Cannes, France	Clay	(United States) Elizabeth Ryan	6–0, 6–1
Win	February 29, 1920	Beaulieu Tournament	Beaulieu, France	Clay	(United States) Elizabeth Ryan	6–2, 6–0
Win	March 7, 1920	Monte Carlo Championships	Monte Carlo, Monaco	Clay	(United States) Elizabeth Ryan	6–1, 6–2
Loss	March 14, 1920	South of France Championships	Nice, France	Clay	(United Kingdom) Geraldine Beamish	default
Win	April 30, 1920	Cannes Beau Site Hotel	Cannes, France	Clay	(Sweden) Sigrid Fick	6–1, 6–1
Win	June 13, 1920	French Championships	Paris, France	Clay	(France) Marguerite Broquedis	6–1, 7–5
Win	July 3, 1920	Wimbledon	London, UK	Grass	(United Kingdom) Dorothea Lambert Chambers	6–3, 6–0
Win	August 9, 1920	Ostende Tournament	Ostende, Belgium	Clay	(United Kingdom) Helen Leisk	6–0, 6–0
Win	August 12, 1920	Knokke-Sure-Mer Tournament	Knokke, Belgium	Clay	(Belgium) Anne de Borman	6–0, 6–2
Win	August 23, 1920	Antwerp Olympics	Antwerp, Belgium	Clay	(United Kingdom) Dorothy Holman	6–3, 6–0
Win	September 5, 1920	Boulogne Tournament	Boulogne, France	Clay	(United Kingdom) Madeline O'Neill	6–0, 6–0
Win	September 12, 1920	Le Touquet Tournament	Le Touquet, France	Clay	(United Kingdom) Madeline O'Neill	6–0, 6–1
Win	January 10, 1921	Cannes Beau Site Hotel	Cannes, France	Clay	(United Kingdom) Blanche Colston	6–0, 6–0
Win	January 16, 1921	Cannes Carlton Club	Cannes, France	Clay	(United States) Elizabeth Ryan	6–0, 6–1
Win	February 14, 1921	Place Mozart Tournament	Nice, France	Clay	(United States) Elizabeth Ryan	6–0, 6–2
Win	February 21, 1921	Cannes Carlton Club II	Cannes, France	Clay	(United States) Elizabeth Ryan	6–0, 6–2
Win	March 6, 1921	La Festa	Monte Carlo, Monaco	Clay	(United States) Elizabeth Ryan	6–2, 6–0
Win	March 21, 1921	South of France Championships	Nice, France	Clay	(France) Marcelle Septier	6–1, 6–1
Win	April 18, 1921	Cannes Carlton Club III	Cannes, France	Clay	(United Kingdom) Phyllis Satterthwaite	6–1, 6–0
Win	May 1, 1921	Beausoleil Championships	Monte Carlo, Monaco	Clay	(United Kingdom) Phyllis Satterthwaite	6–1, 6–0
Win	May 22, 1921	French Championships	Paris, France	Clay	(France) Germaine Golding	default
Win	June 5, 1921	World Hard Court Championships	Paris, France	Clay	(United States) Molla Mallory	6–2, 6–3
Win	July 2, 1921	Wimbledon	Wimbledon, UK	Grass	(United States) Elizabeth Ryan	6–2, 6–0
Win	April 25, 1922	Beausoleil Championships	Monte Carlo, Monaco	Clay	(United States) Eleanor Goss	6–0, 6–0
Win	May 21, 1922	World Hard Court Championships	Brussels, Belgium	Clay	(United States) Elizabeth Ryan	6–3, 6–2
Win	June 11, 1922	French Championships	Paris, France	Clay	(France) Germaine Golding	6–4, 6–0
Win	June 18, 1922	Lille Tournament	Lille, France	Clay	(France) Germaine Golding	6–2, 6–0
Win	July 8, 1922	Wimbledon	London, UK	Grass	(United States) Molla Mallory	6–2, 6–0
Win	July 30, 1922	La Bourboule Tournament	La Bourboule, France	Clay	(France) Hélène Contostavlos	6–1, 6–0
Win	August 6, 1922	Deauville Tournament	Deauville, France	Clay	(France) Marguerite Broquedis	6–1, 6–1
Win	August 13, 1922	Pourville International	Pourville, France	Clay	(France) Marie Danet	rain/split title
Win	September 30, 1922	Marseilles Tournament	Marseilles, France	Clay	(France) Hélène Contostavlos	6–1, 6–0
Win	January 7, 1923	Cannes Beau Site Hotel	Cannes, France	Clay	(United Kingdom) Phyllis Satterthwaite	6–4, 6–2
Win	February 11, 1923	Nice Tournament	Nice, France	Clay	(United States) Elizabeth Ryan	default
Win	February 18, 1923	Cannes Carlton Club II	Cannes, France	Clay	(United States) Elizabeth Ryan	6–3, 6–1
Win	March 12, 1923	Riviera Championships	Menton, France	Clay	(United Kingdom) Kathleen McKane Godfree	6–2, 7–5
Win	March 19, 1923	South of France Championships	Nice, France	Clay	(United States) Elizabeth Ryan	6–1, 6–0
Win	May 27, 1923	World Hard Court Championships	Paris, France	Clay	(United Kingdom) Kathleen McKane Godfree	6–3, 6–3
Win	June 17, 1923	French Championships	Paris, France	Clay	(France) Germaine Golding	6–1, 6–4
Win	July 7, 1923	Wimbledon	London, UK	Grass	(United Kingdom) Kathleen McKane Godfree	6–2, 6–2
Win	August 5, 1923	Deauville	Deauville, France	Clay	(France) Sylvia Lafaurie	6–1, 6–0
Win	August 13, 1923	Pourville Tournament	Pourville, France	Clay	(France) Nanette le Besnerais	6–0, 6–0
Win	August 18, 1923	Cabourg Tournament	Cabourg, France	Clay	(France) Daisy Speranza-Wyns	default
Win	September 2, 1923	Chateau d'Ardennes Tournament	Chateau d'Ardennes, Belgium	Clay	(Belgium) Marthe Dupont	6–1, 6–0
Win	September 10, 1923	Spain Championships	San Sebastian, Spain	Clay	(France) Nanette le Besnerais	6–0, 6–1
Win	September 17, 1923	Biarritz Tournament	Biarritz, France	Clay	(France) Germaine Le Conte	default
Win	October 1, 1923	Portugal Championships	Cascais, Portugal	Clay	(United Kingdom) M Graham	6–0, 6–0
Win	October 14, 1923	Intern. Championships of Barcelona	Barcelona, Spain	Clay	(Spain) Maria Luisa Marnet	6–0, 6–0
Win	February 10, 1924	Nice Tournament	Nice, France	Clay	(United Kingdom) Dorothy Shepherd-Barron	6–0, 6–1
Win	March 9, 1924	Riviera Championships	Menton, France	Clay	(United Kingdom) Phyllis Covell	6–2, 6–1
Win	March 16, 1924	South of France Championships	Nice, France	Clay	(United Kingdom) Phyllis Covell	6–2, 6–1
Win	April 27, 1924	Barcelona International	Barcelona, Spain	Clay	(Spain) Maria Luisa Marnet	6–1, 6–1
Win	February 8, 1925	Nice Tournament	Nice, France	Clay	(France) M Tripp	6–0, 6–1
Win	March 15, 1925	South of France Championships	Nice, France	Clay	(United Kingdom) Ermyntrude Harvey	default
Win	June 7, 1925	French Championships	Paris, France	Clay	(United Kingdom) Kathleen McKane Godfree	6–1, 6–2
Win	July 3, 1925	Wimbledon	Wimbledon, UK	Grass	(United Kingdom) Joan Fry	6–2, 6–0
Win	July 30, 1925	Pourville Tournament	Pourville, France	Clay	(France) Yvonne Bourgeois	6–0, 6–0
Win	August 30, 1925	Deauville Tournament	Deauville, France	Clay	(Australia) Daphne Akhurst	6–2, 6–2
Win	September 6, 1925	Chateau d'Ardennes Tournament	Chateau d'Ardennes, Belgium	Clay	(Belgium) Simone Washer	6–1, 6–1
Win	September 13, 1925	Biarritz Tournament	Biarritz, France	Clay	(France) Marguerite Broquedis	6–0, 6–0
Win	February 7, 1926	Parc Imperial	Nice, France	Clay	(France) MA Wright	6–0, 6–0
Win	February 16, 1926	Cannes Carlton Club	Cannes, France	Clay	(United States) Helen Wills	6–3, 8–6
Win	May 1, 1926	Rome Championships	Rome, Italy	Clay	(United States) Maud Rosenbaum	6–0, 6–0
Win	June 14, 1926	French Championships	Paris, France	Clay	(United States) Mary Browne	6–2, 6–0

- Scores, players, events courtesy of Wright & Ditson's Lawn Tennis Guides and "Suzanne Lenglen: Tennis Idol of the Twenties."

== Performance timelines ==
Key
W	F	SF	QF	#R	RR	Q#	DNQ	A	NH

(W) winner; (F) finalist; (SF) semifinalist; (QF) quarterfinalist; (#R) rounds 4, 3, 2, 1; (RR) round-robin stage; (Q#) qualification round; (DNQ) did not qualify; (A) absent; (NH) not held; (SR) strike rate (events won / competed); (W–L) win–loss record.

=== Singles ===
Tournament	1914	1915–18	1919	1920	1921	1922	1923	1924	1925	1926	SR	W–L	Win %
Grand Slam tournaments (Note: The four modern Grand Slam tournaments were established in 1924. The French Championships are the only such tournament where earlier results are not counted towards Grand Slam statistics because it had not been open to international players. Lenglen never competed at the Australasian Championships, which began for women in 1922.)
French Championships	F	not held		W	W	W	W	A	W	W	2 / 2	10–0	100%
Wimbledon	A	NH	W	W	W	W	W	SF	W	3R	6 / 8	32–0	100%
U.S. Championships	A	A	A	A	2R	A	A	A	A	A	0 / 1	0–1	0%
World Championship tournaments (Note: From 1912 to 1923, there were three World Championship tournaments on different surfaces: Grass Court (Wimbledon), Hard Court (clay), and Covered Court (wood). In 1924, Wimbledon became one of the new Grand Slam tournaments, the World Hard Court Championships were replaced by the French Championships, and the World Covered Court Championships (at which Lenglen never competed) were abolished.)
World Hard Court Championships	W	not held		1R	W	W	W	Defunct			4 / 5	17–0	100%

=== Doubles ===
Tournament	1914	1915–18	1919	1920	1921	1922	1923	1924	1925	1926	SR	W–L	Win %
Grand Slam tournaments
French Championships	F	not held		W	W	W	W	A	W	W	2 / 2	7–0	100%
Wimbledon	A	NH	W	W	W	W	W	QF	W	2R	6 / 8	29–1	97%
U.S. Championships	A	A	A	A	1R	A	A	A	A	A	0 / 1	0–0	–
World Championship tournaments
World Hard Court Championships	W	not held		A	W	W	F	Defunct			3 / 4	13–1	93%

=== Mixed doubles ===
Tournament	1914	1915–18	1919	1920	1921	1922	1923	1924	1925	1926	SR	W–L	Win %
Grand Slam tournaments
French Championships	W	not held		W	W	W	W	A	W	W	2 / 2	8–0	100%
Wimbledon	A	NH	QF	W	2R	W	SF	QF	W	2R	3 / 8	30–2	94%
World Championship tournaments
World Hard Court Championships	F	not held		A	W	W	W	Defunct			3 / 4	16–1	94%

Source: Little

== Longest winning streaks, etc ==
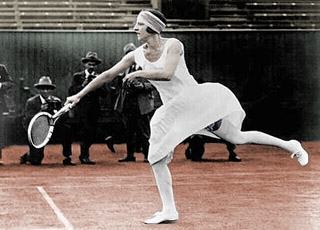
Suzanne Lenglen in action circa 1920

- 181 match win streak from 1921 to 1926.
- 341–7 (97.99%) win-loss record
- Lenglen was ranked world No. 1 for eight years.
- 5 games lost in 5 matches at 1925 Wimbledon. All-time record.
- Won the Triple Crown (singles, doubles, and mixed) three times at Wimbledon. All-time record.
- In the 1922 Wimbledon final Suzanne Lenglen defeated Molla Mallory, 6–2, 6–0, in 23 minutes. All-time record.

== See also ==
- Helen Wills career statistics

== Bibliography ==
- Little, Alan (2007). Suzanne Lenglen: Tennis Idol of the Twenties. London: The Wimbledon Lawn Tennis Museum. ISBN 978-0906741436.
- Robertson, Max (1974). The Encyclopedia of Tennis: 100 years of Great Players and Events. New York: Viking Press. ISBN 978-0670294084.
