= 1922 Wimbledon Championships – Men's doubles =

Men's doubles
- 1922 Wimbledon Championships

Final
- Champion: (Australia) James Anderson (United Kingdom) Randolph Lycett
- Runner-up: (Australia) Pat O'Hara Wood (Australia) Gerald Patterson
- Score: 3–6, 7–9, 6–4, 6–3, 11–9

Details
- Draw: 64
- Seeds: –

Events
Singles	men	women		boys	girls
Doubles	men	women	mixed	boys	girls
← 1921 ·	Wimbledon Championships	· 1923 →

Randolph Lycett and Max Woosnam were the defending champions, but Woosnam did not participate. Lycett partnered with James Anderson and defeated Pat O'Hara Wood and Gerald Patterson in the final, 3–6, 7–9, 6–4, 6–3, 11–9 to win the gentlemen's doubles tennis title at the 1922 Wimbledon Championships.

== Draw ==
=== Key ===
- Q = Qualifier
- WC = Wild card
- LL = Lucky loser
- Alt = Alternate
- SE = Special exempt
- PR = Protected ranking
- ITF = ITF entry
- JE = Junior exempt
- w/o = Walkover
- r = Retired
- d = Defaulted
- SR = Special ranking

=== Finals ===
Quarterfinals
(United Kingdom) Herbert Roper Barrett (South Africa) Brian Norton	3	8	6	2	6
(France) Jacques Brugnon (France) Marcel Dupont	6	6	2	6	4
(Australia) Pat O'Hara Wood (Australia) Gerald Patterson	6	7	3	6
(Belgium) Jean Washer (Belgium) Georges Watson	3	5	6	1
(United Kingdom) Ben Haughton (United Kingdom) Louis Meldon	4	5	1
(Australia) James Anderson (United Kingdom) Randolph Lycett	6	7	6
(United Kingdom) Harry Lewis-Barclay (Australia) Rupert Wertheim	4	6	3	4
(United States) George Caner (United States) Dean Mathey	6	3	6	6

Semifinals
(United Kingdom) Herbert Roper Barrett (South Africa) Brian Norton	1	6	7	3	13
(Australia) Pat O'Hara Wood (Australia) Gerald Patterson	6	3	5	6	15
(Australia) James Anderson (United Kingdom) Randolph Lycett	6	6	6
(United States) George Caner (United States) Dean Mathey	2	3	2

Final
(Australia) Pat O'Hara Wood (Australia) Gerald Patterson	6	9	4	3	9
(Australia) James Anderson (United Kingdom) Randolph Lycett	3	7	6	6	11

=== Top half ===
==== Section 1 ====
First round
(New Zealand) James Lowry (United States) Jimmy Van Alen	3	3	7	10	6
(United Kingdom) AW Davson (United Kingdom) CS Gordon-Smith	6	6	5	8	4
(United Kingdom) Donald Greig (United Kingdom) Hew Stoker	6	8	6
(Spain) Manuel Alonso (Spain) Manuel de Gomar	4	6	2
(United Kingdom) Alfred Ingram (United Kingdom) Leonard Lyle	2	0	11
(United Kingdom) Herbert Roper Barrett (South Africa) Brian Norton	6	6	13
(Portugal) Frederico Vasconcelos (Portugal) SD de Verda	w/o
(Germany) RF Kalberer (United Kingdom) FN Warden
(United Kingdom) Percy Oakley (United Kingdom) Charles Sedgwick	3	1	8
(Spain) José María Alonso (Spain) Eduardo Flaquer	6	6	10
(Australia) Denis Browne (United Kingdom) GTC Watt	6	15	2	3
(France) Jacques Brugnon (France) Marcel Dupont	3	17	6	6
(New Zealand) Frank Fisher (United Kingdom) HF Hunt	11	6	7	4
(France) Alain Gerbault (India) Cotah Ramaswami	9	8	9	6
(United Kingdom) Brian Gilbert (South Africa) Gerald Sherwell
(Italy) Mino Balbi Di Robecco (Italy) Cesare Colombo	w/o

Second round
(New Zealand) J Lowry (United States) J Van Alen	6	6	5	6
(United Kingdom) D Greig (United Kingdom) H Stoker	4	4	7	3
(United Kingdom) HR Barrett (South Africa) B Norton	6	6	6
(Germany) RF Kalberer (United Kingdom) FN Warden	3	4	4
(Spain) JM Alonso (Spain) E Flaquer	3	1	6	4
(France) J Brugnon (France) M Dupont	6	6	3	6
(France) A Gerbault (India) C Ramaswami	6	1	6	4	1
(United Kingdom) B Gilbert (South Africa) G Sherwell	4	6	3	6	6

Third round
(New Zealand) JN Lowry (United States) J Van Alen	w/o
(United Kingdom) H Barrett (South Africa) B Norton
(France) J Brugnon (France) M Dupont	3	6	6	6
(United Kingdom) B Gilbert (South Africa) G Sherwell	6	3	3	1

Quarterfinals
(United Kingdom) HR Barrett (South Africa) B Norton	3	8	6	2	6
(France) J Brugnon (France) M Dupont	6	6	2	6	4

==== Section 2 ====
First round
(United Kingdom) Cecil Campbell (United Kingdom) Xenophon Casdagli
(India) Athar-Ali Fyzee (India) Hassan Ali Fyzee	w/o
(United Kingdom) Frank Jarvis (United Kingdom) Ernest Lamb	2	0	0
(Australia) Pat O'Hara Wood (Australia) Gerald Patterson	6	6	6
(United Kingdom) RS Barnes (United Kingdom) Roderick McNair
(United Kingdom) P Marsden (United Kingdom) DL Morgan	w/o
(United Kingdom) PC Chase (United Kingdom) SF Thol	7	4	3	6	7
(United Kingdom) HO Dixon (South Africa) PM Dixon	5	6	6	3	5
(United Kingdom) Scotter Owen (United Kingdom) Francis Stowe	2	7	10
(Belgium) Jean Washer (Belgium) Georges Watson	6	9	12
(United Kingdom) Ambrose Dudley (United Kingdom) Leslie Godfree	3	6	6	7	3
(France) Jean Borotra (France) Henri Cochet	6	8	1	5	6
(United States) AW Asthalter (United Kingdom) Walter Crawley	6	6	6
(United Kingdom) Arthur Gore (Australia) Frank Riseley	2	2	4
(France) R Peyrelongue (Greece) Augustos Zerlendis	6	4	6	6	1
(United Kingdom) Cyril Eltringham (United Kingdom) Cecil Tindell-Green	8	6	4	3	6

Second round
(United Kingdom) C Campbell (United Kingdom) X Casdagli	4	4	5
(Australia) P O'Hara Wood (Australia) G Patterson	6	6	7
(United Kingdom) RS Barnes (United Kingdom) R McNair	1	6	4	4
(United Kingdom) PC Chase (United Kingdom) SF Thol	6	3	6	6
(Belgium) J Washer (Belgium) G Watson	8	2	6	6
(France) J Borotra (France) H Cochet	6	6	2	4
(United States) AW Asthalter (United Kingdom) W Crawley	3	3	10	2
(United Kingdom) C Eltringham (United Kingdom) C Tindell-Green	6	6	8	6

Third round
(Australia) P O'Hara Wood (Australia) G Patterson	6	6	6
(United Kingdom) PC Chase (United Kingdom) SF Thol	2	3	2
(Belgium) J Washer (Belgium) G Watson	6	6	6
(United Kingdom) C Eltringham (United Kingdom) C Tindell-Green	2	4	4

Quarterfinals
(Australia) P O'Hara Wood (Australia) G Patterson	6	7	3	6
(Belgium) J Washer (Belgium) G Watson	3	5	6	1

=== Bottom half ===
==== Section 3 ====
First round
(United Kingdom) Ben Haughton (United Kingdom) Louis Meldon	6	7	6
(United Kingdom) Harold Aitken (South Africa) WL van Ryn	2	5	0
(South Africa) E Coutts (South Africa) GWV Hurst	w/o
(United Kingdom) Royden Dash (United Kingdom) Bill Swinden
(United Kingdom) Alex Drew (United Kingdom) William Radcliffe	7	4	1
(United Kingdom) Leighton Crawford (United Kingdom) Major Ritchie	9	6	6
(United Kingdom) Victor Cazalet (Canada) Henry Mayes	6	7	6
(United Kingdom) JT Baines (United Kingdom) JCF Simpson	3	5	4
(Australia) James Anderson (United Kingdom) Randolph Lycett	6	2	6	9
(United Kingdom) Charles Kingsley (United States) Amos Wilder	2	6	1	7
(United Kingdom) Robert Walker (United Kingdom) Neville Willford	4	1	1
(United Kingdom) EG Bisseker (United Kingdom) Jack Hillyard	6	6	6
(United Kingdom) Percival Davson (United Kingdom) Theodore Mavrogordato	6	6	8
(United Kingdom) Alex Blair (United Kingdom) DL Craig	3	1	6
(United Kingdom) Eliot Crawshay-Williams (United Kingdom) Royden Wilkinson	w/o
(Sweden) Carl-Erik von Braun (Sweden) Marcus Wallenberg

Second round
(United Kingdom) B Haughton (United Kingdom) L Meldon	7	6	6
(United Kingdom) R Dash (United Kingdom) W Swinden	5	4	2
(United Kingdom) FRL Crawford (United Kingdom) M Ritchie	6	6	6
(United Kingdom) V Cazalet (Canada) H Mayes	3	3	3
(Australia) J Anderson (United Kingdom) R Lycett	6	6	6
(United Kingdom) EG Bisseker (United Kingdom) J Hillyard	1	2	3
(United Kingdom) P Davson (United Kingdom) T Mavrogordato	6	6	9
(Sweden) C-E von Braun (Sweden) M Wallenberg	2	1	7

Third round
(United Kingdom) B Haughton (United Kingdom) L Meldon	6	6	3	8
(United Kingdom) FRL Crawford (United Kingdom) M Ritchie	0	2	6	6
(Australia) J Anderson (United Kingdom) R Lycett	5	15	6	5	7
(United Kingdom) P Davson (United Kingdom) T Mavrogordato	7	13	3	7	5

Quarterfinals
(United Kingdom) B Haughton (United Kingdom) L Meldon	4	5	1
(Australia) J Anderson (United Kingdom) R Lycett	6	7	6

==== Section 4 ====
First round
(Portugal) Antonio Casanovas (Portugal) Luiz Ricciardi
(Belgium) P de Becker (Belgium) Paul de Borman	w/o
(United Kingdom) Arthur Belgrave (United Kingdom) Charles Dixon
(United Kingdom) Tim Horn (United Kingdom) Albert Prebble	w/o
(United Kingdom) Philip Glover (United Kingdom) George Thomas	9	2	2
(United Kingdom) Harry Lewis-Barclay (Australia) Rupert Wertheim	11	6	6
(Romania) Nicolae Mișu (Italy) Uberto de Morpurgo	12	8	6	6	3
(United Kingdom) ArthurLowe (United Kingdom) Gordon Lowe	14	10	3	2	6
(United Kingdom) Vincent Burr (United Kingdom) WT Tucker	0	2	2
(United States) George Caner (United States) Dean Mathey	6	6	6
(United Kingdom) LF Davin (United Kingdom) GM Elliott	6	3	3	2
(United States) Axel Gravem (United Kingdom) John Cecil Masterman	2	6	6	6
(United Kingdom) Dudley Pitt (United Kingdom) Jack Weakley	1	3	4
(India) Syed Mohammad Hadi (India) Donald Rutnam	6	6	6
(Australia) BE Henty (United Kingdom) Sidney Hepburn	4	6	9	6
(United Kingdom) OG Miller (United Kingdom) WB Stott	6	2	7	4

Second round
(Portugal) A Casanovas (Portugal) L Ricciardi	4	5	1
(United Kingdom) A Belgrave (United Kingdom) C Dixon	6	7	6
(United Kingdom) H Lewis-Barclay (Australia) R Wertheim	8	6	8
(United Kingdom) A Lowe (United Kingdom) G Lowe	6	0	6
(United States) G Caner (United States) D Mathey	6	3	6	6
(United States) A Gravem (United Kingdom) JC Masterman	2	6	2	3
(India) SM Hadi (India) D Rutnam	6	7	6
(Australia) BE Henty (United Kingdom) S Hepburn	2	5	2

Third round
(United Kingdom) A Belgrave (United Kingdom) C Dixon	5	1	3
(United Kingdom) H Lewis-Barclay (Australia) R Wertheim	7	6	6
(United States) G Caner (United States) D Mathey	2	6	6	3	6
(India) SM Hadi (India) D Rutnam	6	3	3	6	4

Quarterfinals
(United Kingdom) H Lewis-Barclay (Australia) R Wertheim	4	6	3	4
(United States) G Caner (United States) D Mathey	6	3	6	6
