= 1922 Wimbledon Championships – Mixed doubles =

Mixed doubles
- 1922 Wimbledon Championships

Final
- Champions: (Australia) Pat O'Hara Wood (France) Suzanne Lenglen
- Runners-up: (United Kingdom) Randolph Lycett (United States) Elizabeth Ryan
- Score: 6–4, 6–3

Details
- Draw: 64
- Seeds: –

Events
Singles	men	women		boys	girls
Doubles	men	women	mixed	boys	girls
← 1921 ·	Wimbledon Championships	· 1923 →

Pat O'Hara Wood and Suzanne Lenglen defeated the defending champions Randolph Lycett and Elizabeth Ryan in the final, 6–4, 6–3 to win the mixed doubles tennis title at the 1922 Wimbledon Championships.

== Draw ==
=== Key ===
- Q = Qualifier
- WC = Wild card
- LL = Lucky loser
- Alt = Alternate
- SE = Special exempt
- PR = Protected ranking
- ITF = ITF entry
- JE = Junior exempt
- w/o = Walkover
- r = Retired
- d = Defaulted
- SR = Special ranking

=== Finals ===
Quarterfinals
(United Kingdom) Ben Haughton (United Kingdom) WM Haughton	2	3
(United Kingdom) Brian Gilbert (United Kingdom) Winifred McNair	6	6
(United Kingdom) Randolph Lycett (United States) Elizabeth Ryan	4	6	6
(United Kingdom) Walter Crawley (United Kingdom) Kitty McKane	6	3	3
(United Kingdom) Percy Oakley (United Kingdom) MS Scott	3	4
(United Kingdom) Cecil Tindell-Green (United Kingdom) Vera Youle	6	6
(Australia) Pat O'Hara Wood (France) Suzanne Lenglen	6	6
(Belgium) Jean Washer (United Kingdom) Mrs FS Warburg	2	1

Semifinals
(United Kingdom) Brian Gilbert (United Kingdom) Winifred McNair	0	0
(United Kingdom) Randolph Lycett (United States) Elizabeth Ryan	6	6
(United Kingdom) Cecil Tindell-Green (United Kingdom) Vera Youle	0	0
(Australia) Pat O'Hara Wood (France) Suzanne Lenglen	6	6

Final
(United Kingdom) Randolph Lycett (United States) Elizabeth Ryan	4	3
(Australia) Pat O'Hara Wood (France) Suzanne Lenglen	6	6

=== Top half ===
==== Section 1 ====
First round
(United Kingdom) Herbert Roper Barrett (United Kingdom) Winifred Beamish
(United Kingdom) Percy Pinckney (United Kingdom) Violet Pinckney	w/o
(New Zealand) Edgar Bartleet (France) D Fenwick
(United Kingdom) Gerry Millard (United Kingdom) Blanche Colston	w/o
(United Kingdom) Arthur Gore (United Kingdom) Mrs HB Weston	4	6	7
(United Kingdom) GTC Watt (United Kingdom) D Craddock	6	1	5
(United Kingdom) Hew Stoker; RA Green	2	1
(United Kingdom) Ben Haughton (United Kingdom) WM Haughton	6	6
(New Zealand) Frank Fisher (United Kingdom) Louise Bull	6	6
(United Kingdom) Theodore Mavrogordato (United Kingdom) Mabel Parton	3	4
(United Kingdom) Brian Gilbert (United Kingdom) Winifred McNair	6	9
(Sweden) Carl-Erik von Braun (United Kingdom) Ermyntrude Harvey	0	7
(United Kingdom) EG Bisseker (United Kingdom) C Rimington	2	6	6
(United Kingdom) JCF Simpson (United Kingdom) Madeline O'Neill	6	4	4
(United Kingdom) William Radcliffe (United Kingdom) Eleanor Rose	6	6
(United Kingdom) Ernest Lamb (United Kingdom) Olive Manser	3	3

Second round
(United Kingdom) HR Barrett (United Kingdom) W Beamish	7	6
(New Zealand) E Bartleet (France) D Fenwick	5	2
(United Kingdom) A Gore (United Kingdom) Mrs HB Weston	2	4
(United Kingdom) B Haughton (United Kingdom) WM Haughton	6	6
(New Zealand) F Fisher (United Kingdom) L Bull	2	3
(United Kingdom) JB Gilbert (United Kingdom) WM McNair	6	6
(United Kingdom) EG Bisseker (United Kingdom) C Rimington
(United Kingdom) W Radcliffe (United Kingdom) E Rose	w/o

Third round
(United Kingdom) HR Barrett (United Kingdom) W Beamish	7	1
(United Kingdom) B Haughton (United Kingdom) WM Haughton	9	6
(United Kingdom) B Gilbert (United Kingdom) W McNair
(United Kingdom) EG Bisseker (United Kingdom) C Rimington	w/o

Quarterfinals
(United Kingdom) B Haughton (United Kingdom) WM Haughton	2	3
(United Kingdom) B Gilbert (United Kingdom) W McNair	6	6

The nationality of RA Green is unknown.

==== Section 2 ====
First round
(United Kingdom) Randolph Lycett (United States) Elizabeth Ryan	6	7
(Sweden) Marcus Wallenberg (United Kingdom) Annie Cobb	1	5
(United Kingdom) Bill Swinden (United Kingdom) CM Douglass	3	8	5
(United Kingdom) Ambrose Dudley (United Kingdom) Aurea Edgington	6	6	7
(United Kingdom) CS Gordon-Smith (United Kingdom) Peggy Dransfield	2	2
(United Kingdom) Cecil Campbell (South Africa) Irene Peacock	6	6
(United Kingdom) Alfred Ingram (United Kingdom) Peggy Ingram	3	7	6
(United States) George Caner (United States) Edith Sigourney	6	5	4
(France) Jean Borotra (France) Elizabeth Macready	1	5
(United Kingdom) Walter Crawley (United Kingdom) Kitty McKane	6	7
(United Kingdom) Jack Hillyard (United Kingdom) Phyllis Satterthwaite	4	4
(United States) Axel Gravem (United States) Eleanor Goss	6	6
(India) Cotah Ramaswami (United Kingdom) Evelyn Colyer	1	6	3
(United Kingdom) Leslie Godfree (United Kingdom) Mabel Clayton	6	4	6
(United Kingdom) Vincent Burr (United Kingdom) PM Stevenson	4	2
(Australia) Rupert Wertheim (United Kingdom) Dorothea Lambert Chambers	6	6

Second round
(United Kingdom) R Lycett (United States) E Ryan	6	6
(United Kingdom) A Dudley (United Kingdom) A Edgington	1	2
(United Kingdom) C Campbell (South Africa) I Peacock
(United Kingdom) A Ingram (United Kingdom) M Ingram	w/o
(United Kingdom) W Crawley (United Kingdom) K McKane	6	8
(United States) A Gravem (United States) E Goss	3	6
(United Kingdom) L Godfree (United Kingdom) M Clayton	4	3
(Australia) R Wertheim (United Kingdom) D Lambert Chambers	6	6

Third round
(United Kingdom) R Lycett (United States) E Ryan	6	6
(United Kingdom) C Campbell (South Africa) I Peacock	2	4
(United Kingdom) W Crawley (United Kingdom) K McKane	6	6
(Australia) R Wertheim (United Kingdom) D Lambert Chambers	3	3

Quarterfinals
(United Kingdom) R Lycett (United States) E Ryan	4	6	6
(United Kingdom) W Crawley (United Kingdom) K McKane	6	3	3

=== Bottom half ===
==== Section 3 ====
First round
(United Kingdom) Neville Willford (United Kingdom) Susannah Willford	1	4
(South Africa) PM Dixon (India) Mrs WP Keays	6	6
(United Kingdom) PercyOakley (United Kingdom) MS Scott	6	8
(United Kingdom) Thomas Bevan (United Kingdom) Mrs IFL Elliot	1	6
(Belgium) Paul de Borman (Belgium) Pauline Alison	2	6	2
(United Kingdom) Eric Portlock (United Kingdom) Enid Head	6	2	6
(United Kingdom) Albert Prebble (United Kingdom) Dora Geen	w/o
(United Kingdom) FP Down (United Kingdom) Joy Coote
(United Kingdom) Cecil Tindell-Green (United Kingdom) Vera Youle	4	6	6
(United Kingdom) Herbert Pervin (South Africa) Mrs MF Ellis	6	3	4
(United Kingdom) Xenophon Casdagli (United Kingdom) Dorothy Holman	6	4	6
(United Kingdom) Ulysses Williams (United Kingdom) Mrs MB Reckitt	1	6	2
(United States) AW Asthalter (United Kingdom) Mildred Coles	8	5
(United Kingdom) Noel Turnbull (United Kingdom) Margaret Stocks	10	7
(United Kingdom) Scotter Owen (United Kingdom) Sylvia Lumley-Ellis	6	6
(United Kingdom) Leighton Crawford; Mrs T Bostock	4	1

Second round
(South Africa) PM Dixon (India) Mrs WP Keays	4	1
(United Kingdom) P Oakley (United Kingdom) MS Scott	6	6
(United Kingdom) E Portlock (United Kingdom) E Head	1	7	6
(United Kingdom) FP Down (United Kingdom) J Coote	6	5	8
(United Kingdom) C Tindell-Green (United Kingdom) V Youle
(United Kingdom) X Casdagli (United Kingdom) D Holman	w/o
(United Kingdom) N Turnbull (United Kingdom) M Stocks
(United Kingdom) S Owen (United Kingdom) S Lumley-Ellis	w/o

Third round
(United Kingdom) P Oakley (United Kingdom) MS Scott
(United Kingdom) FP Down (United Kingdom) J Coote	w/o
(United Kingdom) C Tindell-Green (United Kingdom) V Youle	6	6
(United Kingdom) N Turnbull (United Kingdom) M Stocks	3	4

Quarterfinals
(United Kingdom) P Oakley (United Kingdom) MS Scott	3	4
(United Kingdom) C Tindell-Green (United Kingdom) V Youle	6	6

The nationality of Mrs T Bostock is unknown.

==== Section 4 ====
First round
(United Kingdom) LM Hertsman (United Kingdom) Joan Hextall	w/o
(United Kingdom) Humphrey Milford (United Kingdom) Mrs HV Parbury
(United States) Dean Mathey (United States) Molla Mallory	6	6
(United Kingdom) Harold Aitken (United Kingdom) Beatrice Brown	4	2
(South Africa) Gerald Sherwell (United Kingdom) Dorothy Kemmis-Betty
(United Kingdom) RH Hotham (United Kingdom) Ruth Winch	w/o
(Australia) Pat O'Hara Wood (France) Suzanne Lenglen	6	6
(United Kingdom) Alex Drew (United Kingdom) Norah Middleton	1	1
(United Kingdom) GM Elliott (United Kingdom) Mrs Rawson-Wood	w/o
(United Kingdom) WL Hollick (United Kingdom) Mrs WL Hollick
(Belgium) Jean Washer (United Kingdom) Mrs FS Warburg	6	6
(United Kingdom) WT Tucker (United Kingdom) Mrs CE Hunter	3	4
(United Kingdom) SF Thol (United Kingdom) Helen Leisk	6	6
(United Kingdom) LF Davin (United Kingdom) Molly Welsh	4	3
(Greece) Augustos Zerlendis (United Kingdom) Mrs AA Hall	7	6
(United Kingdom) George Thomas (United Kingdom) Hazel Hogarth	5	4

Second round
(United Kingdom) H Milford (United Kingdom) Mrs HV Parbury	2	8	5
(United States) D Mathey (United States) M Mallory	6	6	7
(South Africa) G Sherwell (United Kingdom) D Kemmis-Betty	2	1
(Australia) P O'Hara Wood (France) S Lenglen	6	6
(United Kingdom) WL Hollick (United Kingdom) Mrs WL Hollick	1	4
(Belgium) J Washer (United Kingdom) Mrs FS Warburg	6	6
(United Kingdom) SF Thol (United Kingdom) H Leisk
(Greece) A Zerlendis (United Kingdom) Mrs AA Hall	w/o

Third round
(United States) D Mathey (United States) M Mallory	2	4
(Australia) P O'Hara Wood (France) S Lenglen	6	6
(Belgium) J Washer (United Kingdom) Mrs FS Warburg	4	6	6
(United Kingdom) SF Thol (United Kingdom) H Leisk	6	2	3

Quarterfinals
(Australia) P O'Hara Wood (France) S Lenglen	6	6
(Belgium) J Washer (United Kingdom) Mrs FS Warburg	2	1
