= 1924 Australasian Championships – Mixed doubles =

Mixed doubles
- 1924 Australasian Championships

Final
- Champions: (Australia) Daphne Akhurst (Australia) Jim Willard
- Runners-up: (Australia) Esna Boyd (Australia) Gar Hone
- Score: 6–3, 6–4

Details
- Draw: 16
- Seeds: 4

Events
Singles	men	women		boys	girls
Doubles	men	women	mixed	boys	girls
← 1923 ·	Australasian Championships	· 1925 →

The fourth-seeds Daphne Akhurst and Jim Willard defeated the third seeded Esna Boyd and Gar Hone 6–3, 6–4 in the final, to win the mixed doubles tennis title at the 1924 Australasian Championships.

== Seeds ==
1. (Australia) Meryl O'Hara Wood / (Australia) Pat O'Hara Wood (first round)
2. (Australia) Sylvia Lance / (Australia) Ian McInnes (semifinals)
3. (Australia) Esna Boyd / (Australia) Gar Hone (final)
4. (Australia) Daphne Akhurst / (Australia) Jim Willard (champions)

== Draw ==
=== Key ===
- Q = Qualifier
- WC = Wild card
- LL = Lucky loser
- Alt = Alternate
- ITF = ITF entry
- PR = Protected ranking
- SR = Special ranking
- SE = Special exempt
- JE = Junior exempt
- JR = Junior Accelerator Programme entrant
- CO = College Accelerator Programme entrant
- NG = Next Gen Accelerator Program entrant
- w/o = Walkover
- r = Retired
- d = Defaulted

=== Draw ===
First round
(Australia) Dorothy Hope (Australia) Bob Schlesinger	3	6	6
1	(Australia) Meryl O'Hara Wood (Australia) Pat O'Hara Wood	6	2	4
(Australia) Minnie Richardson (Australia) Colin Newton	6	1	6
(Australia) Gwen Hack (Australia) Clive Fitts	2	6	4
4	(Australia) Daphne Akhurst (Australia) Jim Willard	6	6
(Australia) Mrs. W. T. Rowe (Australia) Frank Drews	2	4
(Australia) Mall Molesworth (Australia) Norman Roberts	6	6
(United Kingdom) Hester Phillimore (Australia) Noel Heath	4	2
2	(Australia) Sylvia Lance (Australia) Ian McInnes	7	6
(Australia) Vere de Bavay (Australia) Rupert Wertheim	5	1
(Australia) Kathleen Le Messurier (Australia) W. H. Smith	6	3	9
(Australia) Quentin Winter-Irving (Australia) Basil Henty	2	6	7
3	(Australia) Esna Boyd (Australia) Gar Hone	6	7
(Australia) Mavis McIver (Australia) Tim Fitchett	2	5
(Australia) Marjorie Todd (Australia) Jack Clemenger	6	4	6
(Australia) Ursula Bere (Australia) Alec Sandral	2	6	1

Quarterfinals
(Australia) Dorothy Hope (Australia) Bob Schlesinger	4	6	6
(Australia) Minnie Richardson (Australia) Colin Newton	6	2	3
4	(Australia) Daphne Akhurst (Australia) Jim Willard	6	6
(Australia) Mall Molesworth (Australia) Norman Roberts	3	0
2	(Australia) Sylvia Lance (Australia) Ian McInnes	6	6
(Australia) Kathleen Le Messurier (Australia) W. H. Smith	0	3
3	(Australia) Esna Boyd (Australia) Gar Hone	6	6
(Australia) Marjorie Todd (Australia) Jack Clemenger	3	3

Semifinals
(Australia) Dorothy Hope (Australia) Bob Schlesinger	5	2
4	(Australia) Daphne Akhurst (Australia) Jim Willard	7	6
2	(Australia) Sylvia Lance (Australia) Ian McInnes	1	4
3	(Australia) Esna Boyd (Australia) Gar Hone	6	6

Final
4	(Australia) Daphne Akhurst (Australia) Jim Willard	6	6
3	(Australia) Esna Boyd (Australia) Gar Hone	3	4
