= 1922 Australasian Championships =

- Date: 1–9 December 1922
- Edition: 15th
- Category: Grand Slam (ITF)
- Surface: Grass
- Location: Sydney, Australia
- Venue: White City Tennis Club

Champions

Men's singles
- (Australia) James Anderson

Women's singles
- (Australia) Margaret Molesworth

Men's doubles
- (Australia) Jack Hawkes / (Australia) Gerald Patterson

Women's doubles
- (Australia) Esna Boyd Robertson / (Australia) Marjorie Mountain

Mixed doubles
- (Australia) Esna Boyd Robertson / (Australia) Jack Hawkes
- Australasian Championships

The 1922 Australasian Championships was a tennis tournament that took place on outdoor Grass courts at the White City Tennis Club, Sydney, Australia, from 2 December to 9 December. It was the 15th edition of the Australian Championships (now known as the Australian Open), the third held in Sydney, and the third Grand Slam tournament of the year. It was the inaugural year for the women's singles, women's doubles and mixed doubles competitions. The singles titles were won by Australians James Anderson and Margaret Molesworth.

== Finals ==
=== Men's singles ===
(Australia) James Anderson defeated (Australia) Gerald Patterson 6–0, 3–6, 3–6, 6–3, 6–2

=== Women's singles ===
(Australia) Margaret Molesworth defeated (Australia) Esna Boyd 6–3, 10–8

=== Men's doubles ===
(Australia) Jack Hawkes / (Australia) Gerald Patterson defeated (Australia) James Anderson / (Australia) Norman Peach 8–10, 6–0, 6–0, 7–5

=== Women's doubles ===
(Australia) Esna Boyd Robertson / (Australia) Marjorie Mountain defeated (Australia) Floris St. George / (Australia) Gwen Utz 1–6, 6–4, 7–5

=== Mixed doubles ===
(Australia) Esna Boyd Robertson / (Australia) Jack Hawkes defeated (Australia) Gwen Utz / (Australia) Harold Utz 6–1, 6–1

Preceded by 1922 U.S. National Championships	Grand Slams	Succeeded by 1923 Wimbledon Championships
