= 1924 Australasian Championships – Women's singles =

Women's singles
- 1924 Australasian Championships

Final
- Champion: (Australia) Sylvia Lance
- Runner-up: (Australia) Esna Boyd
- Score: 6–3, 3–6, 6–4

Details
- Draw: 22
- Seeds: 8

Events
Singles	men	women		boys	girls
Doubles	men	women	mixed	boys	girls
← 1923 ·	Australasian Championships	· 1925 →

Sylvia Lance defeated Esna Boyd 6–3, 3–6, 6–4, in the final to win the women's singles tennis title at the 1924 Australian Championships.

== Seeds ==
The seeded players are listed below. Sylvia Lance is the champion; others show the round in which they were eliminated.

1. (Australia) Mall Molesworth (quarterfinals)
2. (Australia) Esna Boyd (finalist)
3. (Australia) Sylvia Lance (champion)
4. (Australia) Daphne Akhurst (semifinals)
5. (Australia) Lily Addison (first round)
6. (Australia) Kathleen Le Messurier (semifinals)
7. n/a ^{[a]}
8. (Australia) Marjorie Todd (quarterfinals)

== Draw ==
=== Key ===
- Q = Qualifier
- WC = Wild card
- LL = Lucky loser
- r = Retired

=== Finals ===
Quarterfinals
1	(Australia) Mall Molesworth	9	3	6
6	(Australia) Kathleen Le Messurier	7	6	8
8	(Australia) Marjorie Todd	6	4	1
3	(Australia) Sylvia Lance	1	6	6
2	(Australia) Esna Boyd	6	6
(Australia) -. Simpson	1	1
(Australia) V. Mather	1	4
4	(Australia) Daphne Akhurst	6	6

Semifinals
6	(Australia) Kathleen Le Messurier	2	2
3	(Australia) Sylvia Lance	6	6
2	(Australia) Esna Boyd	6	6
4	(Australia) Daphne Akhurst	1	4

Finals
3	(Australia) Sylvia Lance	6	3	6
2	(Australia) Esna Boyd	3	6	4

=== Earlier rounds ===
==== Section 1 ====
First round
8	(Australia) Todd	6	6
(Australia) Hoddle-Wrigley	3	3
3	(Australia) Lance	6	6
(Australia) McIver	2	1
(Australia) Mrs. W. T. Rowe	6	6
(Australia) Muirhead	1	0

Second round
1	(Australia) Molesworth
(Australia) Howett	w/o
6	(Australia) Le Messurier	6	6
(Australia) Richardson	3	1
(Australia) De Bavay	1	1
8	(Australia) Todd	6	6
3	(Australia) Lance	6	6
(Australia) Mrs. W. T. Rowe	3	2

Quarterfinals
1	(Australia) Molesworth	9	3	6
6	(Australia) Le Messurier	7	6	8
8	(Australia) Todd	6	4	1
3	(Australia) Lance	1	6	6

Semifinals
6	(Australia) Le Messurier	2	2
3	(Australia) Lance	6	6

==== Section 2 ====
First round
(United Kingdom) Johnson
5	(Australia) Addison	w/o
2	(Australia) Boyd	6	6
(United Kingdom) Thynne	2	1
(Australia) Hack	6	7
(Australia) Salter	3	5

Second round
(United Kingdom) Johnson	1	1
2	(Australia) Boyd	6	6
(Australia) Hack	3	8	4
(Australia) Simpson	6	6	6
(Australia) Ferguson	2	8
(Australia) Mather	6	10
(Australia) Bere	6	5	0
4	(Australia) Akhurst	4	7	6

Quarterfinals
2	(Australia) Boyd	6	6
(Australia) Simpson	1	1
(Australia) Mather	1	4
4	(Australia) Akhurst	6	6

Semifinals
2	(Australia) Boyd	6	6
4	(Australia) Akhurst	1	4

== Notes ==
- ^{a} Meryl O'Hara Wood was the seventh seed in an original draw.

Preceded by 1923 U.S. National Championships – Women's singles	Grand Slam women's singles	Succeeded by 1924 Wimbledon Championships – Women's singles
