= 1924 Australasian Championships – Women's doubles =

Women's doubles
- 1924 Australasian Championships

Final
- Champions: (Australia) Daphne Akhurst (Australia) Sylvia Lance
- Runners-up: (Australia) Kathleen Le Messurier (Australia) Meryl O'Hara Wood
- Score: 7–5, 6–2

Details
- Draw: 16
- Seeds: 4

Events
Singles	men	women		boys	girls
Doubles	men	women	mixed	boys	girls
- Australasian Championships

First-seeded Daphne Akhurst and Sylvia Lance defeated the fourth seeds Kathleen Le Messurier and Meryl O'Hara Wood 7–5, 6–2 in the final, to win the women's doubles tennis title at the 1924 Australasian Championships.

== Seeds ==
1. (Australia) Daphne Akhurst / (Australia) Sylvia Lance (champions)
2. (Australia) Esna Boyd / (Australia) Marjorie Todd (semifinals)
3. (Australia) Mall Molesworth / (Australia) Dorothy Rendall (semifinals)
4. (Australia) Kathleen Le Messurier / (Australia) Meryl O'Hara Wood (final)

== Draw ==
Key

- Q = Qualifier
- WC = Wild card
- LL = Lucky loser
- Alt = Alternate
- ITF = ITF entry
- PR = Protected ranking
- SR = Special ranking
- SE = Special exempt
- JE = Junior exempt
- JR = Junior Accelerator Programme entrant
- CO = College Accelerator Programme entrant
- NG = Next Gen Accelerator Program entrant
- w/o = Walkover
- r = Retired
- d = Defaulted

=== Draw ===
First round
2	(Australia) Esna Boyd (Australia) Marjorie Todd	6	6
(Australia) Violet Mather (Australia) Doris Mountain	1	2
(Australia) Louie Boddington (Australia) Nell Thyne	6	6
(Australia) Ruby Mercer (Australia) Isabel Wade	3	1
4	(Australia) Kathleen Le Messurier (Australia) Meryl O'Hara Wood	6	6
(Australia) Vere de Bavay (Australia) Ursula Bere	2	1
(Australia) Gwen Hack (Australia) Mrs. W. T. Rowe	6	8	7
(Australia) Mrs G. B. Goodes (Australia) Helen Outhwaite	8	6	5
1	(Australia) Daphne Akhurst (Australia) Sylvia Lance	6	6
(Australia) Kathleen Roberts (Australia) Jessie Salter	1	1
(Australia) Minnie Richardson (Australia) Jessie Simpson	6	6
(Australia) Dorothy Hope (Australia) Mavis McIver ^{[a]}	3	4
3	(Australia) Mall Molesworth (Australia) Dorothy Rendall	6	6
(Australia) M. Farnsworth (Australia) I. Morton	4	1
(Australia) Youtha Anthony (Australia) Frances Hoddle-Wrigley	w/o
(Australia) Nancy Grant (United Kingdom) Hester Phillimore

Quarterfinals
2	(Australia) Esna Boyd (Australia) Marjorie Todd	9	6
(Australia) Louie Boddington (Australia) Nell Thyne	7	3
4	(Australia) Kathleen Le Messurier (Australia) Meryl O'Hara Wood	6	6
(Australia) Gwen Hack (Australia) Mrs. W. T. Rowe	2	1
1	(Australia) Daphne Akhurst (Australia) Sylvia Lance	6	6
(Australia) Minnie Richardson (Australia) Jessie Simpson	3	2
3	(Australia) Mall Molesworth (Australia) Dorothy Rendall	6	6
(Australia) Youtha Anthony (Australia) Frances Hoddle-Wrigley	3	2

Semifinals
2	(Australia) Esna Boyd (Australia) Marjorie Todd	4	3
4	(Australia) Kathleen Le Messurier (Australia) Meryl O'Hara Wood	6	6
1	(Australia) Daphne Akhurst (Australia) Sylvia Lance	6	6
3	(Australia) Mall Molesworth (Australia) Dorothy Rendall	3	1

Final
4	(Australia) Kathleen Le Messurier (Australia) Meryl O'Hara Wood	5	2
1	(Australia) Daphne Akhurst (Australia) Sylvia Lance	7	6

== Notes ==
- ^{a} Lily Addison in an original draw.
