= 1922 Wimbledon Championships – Men's singles =

Men's singles
- 1922 Wimbledon Championships

Final
- Champion: (Australia) Gerald Patterson
- Runner-up: (United Kingdom) Randolph Lycett
- Score: 6–3, 6–4, 6–2

Details
- Draw: 128
- Seeds: –

Events
Singles	men	women		boys	girls
Doubles	men	women	mixed	boys	girls
← 1921 ·	Wimbledon Championships	· 1923 →

Gerald Patterson defeated Randolph Lycett 6–3, 6–4, 6–2 in the final to win the gentlemen's singles tennis title at the 1922 Wimbledon Championships. Bill Tilden was the defending champion, but did not participate.

== Draw ==
=== Key ===
- Q = Qualifier
- WC = Wild card
- LL = Lucky loser
- Alt = Alternate
- SE = Special exempt
- PR = Protected ranking
- ITF = ITF entry
- JE = Junior exempt
- w/o = Walkover
- r = Retired
- d = Defaulted
- SR = Special ranking

=== Finals ===
Quarterfinals
(United Kingdom) Randolph Lycett	2	6	6	8
(United Kingdom) Percival Davson	6	1	4	6
(United Kingdom) Theodore Mavrogordato	4	6	3	6	2
(United Kingdom) Brian Gilbert	6	3	6	3	6
(Australia) James Anderson	6	6	2	2	6
(Australia) Pat O'Hara Wood	3	3	6	6	4
(Australia) Gerald Patterson	7	6	6	6
(United Kingdom) Cecil Campbell	9	3	2	1

Semifinals
(United Kingdom) Randolph Lycett	8	9	6
(United Kingdom) Brian Gilbert	6	7	3
(Australia) James Anderson	1	6	9	1	3
(Australia) Gerald Patterson	6	3	7	6	6

Final
(United Kingdom) Randolph Lycett	3	4	2
(Australia) Gerald Patterson	6	6	6

=== Top half ===
==== Section 1 ====
First round
(United Kingdom) EG Bisseker	1	5	6	6	3
(Spain) Manuel Alonso	6	7	3	2	6
(France) Jacques Brugnon	9	4	5	6	6
(United Kingdom) John Cecil Masterman	7	6	7	2	2
(United Kingdom) HP Greenwood	7	6	5	7	5
(Spain) José María Alonso	5	4	7	9	7
(United States) AW Asthalter	2	4	2
(United Kingdom) Major Ritchie	6	6	6
(United Kingdom) OG Miller	3	5	7	6	2
(United Kingdom) George Golding	6	7	5	4	6
(United Kingdom) Randolph Lycett	6	5	6	6
(Italy) Cesare Colombo	4	7	4	4
(United Kingdom) Mark Hick	3	5	3
(United Kingdom) Philip Glover	6	7	6
(Italy) Uberto de Morpurgo
(Belgium) P de Becker	w/o

Second round
(Spain) M Alonso	3	4	6	3
(France) J Brugnon	6	6	4	6
(Spain) JM Alonso	3	5	6	1
(United Kingdom) M Ritchie	6	7	2	6
(United Kingdom) G Golding	2	2	4
(United Kingdom) R Lycett	6	6	6
(United Kingdom) P Glover	5	1	3
(Italy) H de Morpurgo	7	6	6

Third round
(France) J Brugnon	8	6	6
(United Kingdom) M Ritchie	6	2	4
(United Kingdom) R Lycett	4	6	6	6
(Italy) H de Morpurgo	6	3	0	3

Fourth round
(France) J Brugnon	2	6	5	3
(United Kingdom) R Lycett	6	1	7	6

==== Section 2 ====
First round
(United Kingdom) Charles Roupell	6	6	2	6
(New Zealand) James Lowry	1	4	6	3
(United Kingdom) Alex Drew	6	6	6
(United Kingdom) HO Dixon	1	4	2
(United Kingdom) Ben Haughton	4	2	2
(United Kingdom) Arthur Lowe	6	6	6
(United Kingdom) Charles Dixon	4	5	6	3
(France) Marcel Dupont	6	7	2	6
(New Zealand) Edgar Bartleet	1	6	3	4
(United Kingdom) Thomas Bevan	6	3	6	6
(United Kingdom) Ambrose Dudley	4	7	3	6	4
(United Kingdom) Percival Davson	6	5	6	4	6
(United Kingdom) Donald Greig	6	6	6
(Portugal) Luiz Ricciardi	1	0	1
(United States) George Caner	6	6	11
(Australia) Robert Barbour	1	1	9

Second round
(United Kingdom) C Roupell	5	3	9	2
(United Kingdom) A Drew	7	6	7	6
(United Kingdom) A Lowe	6	4	6	6	6
(France) M Dupont	8	6	1	0	4
(United Kingdom) T Bevan	6	1	6	6	6
(United Kingdom) P Davson	8	6	3	4	8
(United Kingdom) D Greig	5	6	6	1	4
(United States) G Caner	7	2	2	6	6

Third round
(United Kingdom) A Drew	4	6	7	8
(United Kingdom) A Lowe	6	2	5	6
(United Kingdom) P Davson	6	6	7
(United States) G Caner	4	3	5

Fourth round
(United Kingdom) A Drew	0	4	3
(United Kingdom) P Davson	6	6	6

==== Section 3 ====
First round
(United Kingdom) Theodore Mavrogordato	6	6	6
(South Africa) Gerald Sherwell	2	1	1
(United Kingdom) Alfred Ingram	6	6	1	5	2
(United States) Amos Wilder	3	4	6	7	6
(United Kingdom) Leonard Lyle	6	6	6
(United Kingdom) Monty Temple	1	3	3
(United Kingdom) CS Gordon-Smith	4	4	0^{r}
(United Kingdom) Clinton McIlquham	6	6	0
(United Kingdom) Jack Weakley	3	1	1
(Sweden) Carl-Erik von Braun	6	6	6
(United Kingdom) PC Chase	6	2	6	6
(South Africa) WL van Ryn	1	6	2	3
(United Kingdom) DL Craig	6	8	9
(South Africa) Julien Lezard	1	6	7
(United Kingdom) Humphrey Milford	9	6	1	3	5
(United Kingdom) HR Fussell	7	4	6	6	7

Second round
(United Kingdom) T Mavrogordato	6	6	6
(United States) A Wilder	1	0	1
(United Kingdom) L Lyle	6	6	6
(United Kingdom) C McIlquham	4	4	1
(Sweden) C-E von Braun	6	7	6
(United Kingdom) PC Chase	4	5	3
(United Kingdom) DL Craig	4	2	3
(United Kingdom) HR Fussell	6	6	6

Third round
(United Kingdom) T Mavrogordato	6	6	1	6
(United Kingdom) L Lyle	2	2	6	3
(Sweden) C-E von Braun	3	2	5
(United Kingdom) HR Fussell	6	6	7

Fourth round
(United Kingdom) T Mavrogordato	6	7	6
(United Kingdom) HR Fussell	1	5	4

==== Section 4 ====
First round
(United Kingdom) Victor Cazalet	2	3	2
(United Kingdom) Harry Lewis-Barclay	6	6	6
(United Kingdom) Arthur Belgrave
(Portugal) Frederico Vasconcelos	w/o
(New Zealand) Frank Fisher	6	6	6
(France) Alain Gerbault	3	0	0
(United Kingdom) Brian Gilbert	6	4	6	7
(United Kingdom) CS Grace	4	6	3	5
(India) Syed Mohammad Hadi	3	4	6	6	6
(United Kingdom) Scotter Owen	6	6	4	1	2
(Belgium) Paul de Borman	1	2	3
(United Kingdom) Alex Blair	6	6	6
(United Kingdom) Royden Dash	6	6	2	6
(United Kingdom) Dudley Pitt	4	2	6	4
(United Kingdom) George Thomas	2	6	6	6
(United Kingdom) AW Davson	6	4	3	3

Second round
(United Kingdom) H Lewis-Barclay	6	6	6
(United Kingdom) A Belgrave	4	4	2
(New Zealand) F Fisher	4	3	1
(United Kingdom) B Gilbert	6	6	6
(India) SM Hadi	2	7	6	6
(United Kingdom) A Blair	6	5	4	4
(United Kingdom) R Dash	6	2	3	4
(United Kingdom) G Thomas	0	6	6	6

Third round
(United Kingdom) H Lewis-Barclay	3	6	5	3
(United Kingdom) B Gilbert	6	2	7	6
(India) SM Hadi	6	6	4	5
(United Kingdom) G Thomas	8	4	6	7

Fourth round
(United Kingdom) B Gilbert	9	6	3	6	6
(United Kingdom) G Thomas	11	2	6	2	0

=== Bottom half ===
==== Section 5 ====
First round
(United Kingdom) Arthur Gore	2	2	4
(India) Hassan Ali Fyzee	6	6	6
(United Kingdom) Sidney Hepburn
(Italy) Mino Balbi di Robecco	w/o
(South Africa) Brian Norton	6	6	7
(United Kingdom) Bill Swinden	4	2	5
(Australia) James Anderson	7	7	6
(United Kingdom) Noel Turnbull	5	5	3
(United States) Dean Mathey	0	6	6	7
(Belgium) Jean Washer	6	2	2	5
(France) Henri Cochet	4	3	6	7	6
(United Kingdom) Walter Crawley	6	6	4	5	2
(Portugal) Antonio Casanovas	2	1	3
(Romania) Nicolae Mișu	6	6	6
(United Kingdom) Ulysses Williams	7	10	0	12	3
(India) Cotah Ramaswami	5	8	6	14	6

Second round
(India) HA Fyzee	6	3	6	6
(United Kingdom) S Hepburn	1	6	2	2
(South Africa) B Norton	2	3	2
(Australia) J Anderson	6	6	6
(United States) D Mathey	2	6	4	2
(France) H Cochet	6	3	6	6
(Romania) N Mișu	6	6	6
(India) C Ramaswami	1	4	3

Third round
(India) HA Fyzee	2	6	2	3
(Australia) J Anderson	6	2	6	6
(France) H Cochet	3	6	6	4	6
(Romania) N Mișu	6	3	3	6	2

Fourth round
(Australia) J Anderson	6	6	6
(France) H Cochet	3	0	4

==== Section 6 ====
First round
(United Kingdom) Neville Willford	6	6	5	6
(Spain) Eduardo Flaquer	4	4	7	3
(United Kingdom) Tim Horn	2	3	3
(Sweden) Marcus Wallenberg	6	6	6
(United Kingdom) Charles Kingsley
(Portugal) SD de Verda	w/o
(United Kingdom) William Radcliffe	4	6	6	9
(France) R Peyrelongue	6	4	4	7
(France) René Lacoste	1	1	3
(Australia) Pat O'Hara Wood	6	6	6
(Italy) GLA Brian	3	0	1
(Spain) Manuel de Gomar	6	6	6
(United Kingdom) Leighton Crawford	6	3	3	7
(United Kingdom) Jack Hillyard	1	6	6	9
(United Kingdom) WL Hollick	2	4	4
(Greece) Augustos Zerlendis	6	6	6

Second round
(Spain) E Flaquer	7	6	2	6	6
(Sweden) M Wallenberg	5	3	6	8	4
(United Kingdom) C Kingsley	3	2	4
(United Kingdom) W Radcliffe	6	6	6
(Australia) P O'Hara Wood	6	6	6
(Spain) M de Gomar	1	3	4
(United Kingdom) J Hillyard	6	0	6	5	6
(Greece) A Zerlendis	2	6	4	7	3

Third round
(Spain) E Flaquer	6	7	6
(United Kingdom) W Radcliffe	2	5	2
(Australia) P O'Hara Wood	6	4	6	6
(United Kingdom) J Hillyard	3	6	2	0

Fourth round
(Spain) E Flaquer	2	4	9
(Australia) P O'Hara Wood	6	6	11

==== Section 7 ====
First round
(Australia) Gerald Patterson
(United Kingdom) DL Morgan	w/o
(United States) Axel Gravem	6	6	4	7
(Belgium) Georges Watson	4	2	6	5
(France) Jean Borotra	6	6	6
(United Kingdom) Frank Jarvis	3	4	4
(United Kingdom) LF Davin	2	6	2
(United Kingdom) Cyril Eltringham	6	8	6
(United Kingdom) Leslie Godfree	1	3	0
(United Kingdom) Algernon Kingscote	6	6	6
(South Africa) E Coutts	w/o
(United Kingdom) AJ Gore
(United Kingdom) RH Hotham	2	1	0
(Australia) Rupert Wertheim	6	6	6
(United Kingdom) Neville Deed	2	1	0
(France) André Gobert	6	6	6

Second round
(Australia) G Patterson	6	6	6
(United States) A Gravem	1	1	4
(France) J Borotra	6	6	6
(United Kingdom) C Eltringham	2	2	2
(United Kingdom) A Kingscote	6	6	6
(United Kingdom) AJ Gore	3	2	1
(Australia) R Wertheim	4	4	2
(France) A Gobert	6	6	6

Third round
(Australia) G Patterson	6	6	6
(France) J Borotra	0	1	3
(United Kingdom) A Kingscote	4	6	6	6
(France) A Gobert	6	4	2	2

Fourth round
(Australia) G Patterson	6	3	5	6	6
(United Kingdom) A Kingscote	4	6	7	4	3

==== Section 8 ====
First round
(India) Donald Rutnam	6	6	7
(United Kingdom) Percy Pinckney	3	3	5
(India) Athar-Ali Fyzee	3	0	0^{r}
(United Kingdom) Gordon Lowe	6	6	2
(United Kingdom) Cecil Campbell	3	6	6	6
(South Africa) GWV Hurst	6	1	3	2
(United States) Jimmy Van Alen	3	4	7	2
(United Kingdom) Louis Meldon	6	6	5	6
(United Kingdom) WHM Aitken	6	8	5	4
(United Kingdom) F Rattigan	2	10	7	2^{r}
(United Kingdom) SF Thol	0	7	2	5
(United Kingdom) George Stoddart	6	5	6	7
(United Kingdom) Hew Stoker	6	6	6
(United Kingdom) Sydney Watts	4	2	2
(United Kingdom) GM Elliott	6	4	3	3
(United Kingdom) Cecil Tindell-Green	3	6	6	6

Second round
(India) D Rutnam	3	1	3
(United Kingdom) G Lowe	6	6	6
(United Kingdom) C Campbell	6	6	6
(United Kingdom) L Meldon	4	3	1
(United Kingdom) WHM Aitken	2	6	6	7
(United Kingdom) G Stoddart	6	2	3	5
(United Kingdom) H Stoker	3	5	4
(United Kingdom) C Tindell-Green	6	7	6

Third round
(United Kingdom) G Lowe	13	2	4
(United Kingdom) C Campbell	15	6	6
(United Kingdom) WHM Aitken	1	1	1
(United Kingdom) C Tindell-Green	6	6	6

Fourth round
(United Kingdom) C Campbell	2	6	9	6
(United Kingdom) C Tindell-Green	6	2	7	0

Preceded by 1922 Australasian Championships – Men's singles	Grand Slam men's singles	Succeeded by 1922 U.S. National Championships – Men's singles
