= Philip Glover =

English tennis player

- Full name: Philip Foster Glover
- Country (sports): United Kingdom
- Born: 9 February 1894 Handforth, Cheshire, England
- Died: 26 April 1957 (age 64) Marylebone, London, England
- Turned pro: 1919 (amateur tour)
- Retired: 1946

Singles
- Career record: 36–14
- Career titles: 2

Grand Slam singles results
- Wimbledon: 2R (1922, 1926, 1930, 1933)

Other tournaments
- WCCC: 1R (1920)

Philip Foster Glover (9 February 1894 – 26 April 1957) was an English tennis player. He competed at the Wimbledon Championships between 1919 and 1933 in singles. and played at the 1920 World Covered Court Championships at the Queen's Club. He was active from 1919 to 1946 and contested 5 career single finals winning 2 titles.

== Career ==
Philip Foster Glover was born on 9 February 1894 in Handforth, Cheshire, England with the birth registered in Altrincham. He played his first tournament at the Sandown Open in 1919 where he reached the final and lost to George Watt. In 1924 he won his first singles title at the Western Province Championships in Cape Town, South Africa. In 1926 he was a quarter finalist at the British Hard Court Championships where he lost to Bunny Austin.

In 1927 he won second and final singles title at the Alverstoke Open against Roger Worthington. In 1931 he played at the Saint-Raphaël International at Saint-Raphaël-sur-Mer in France where he lost in the quarter finals to André Merlin., the same year he was a finalist at Sandown for the second time where he lost to Brian Gilbert. In 1933 he reached the final of the Sandown Open for the third time, but was beaten by Keats Lester. In 1946 he played his final singles tournament at the Irish Championships in Dublin where he lost in the third round to Tony Mottram.

Philip Foster Glover died on 26 April 1957 in Marylebone, London, England aged 64.
