= Alverstoke Open =

Defunct tennis tournament
- Tour: ILTF Circuit
- Founded: 1918; 107 years ago
- Abolished: 1981; 44 years ago
- Location: Alverstoke, Hampshire, England
- Venue: Alverstoke Lawn Tennis Club
- Surface: Grass/Clay (outdoors)

The Alverstoke Open was an annual combined tennis tournament founded in 1909 as the Gosport Tournament at Alverstoke, Hampshire, England. The tournament was mainly played on grass courts except for the 1921 to 1923 editions which were played on clay courts. The tournament was part of the ILTF Circuit and ended in 1981.

== History ==
Alverstoke Lawn Tennis Club was founded in 1880. The club had lawn tennis tournaments as early as 1900. In 1909 Gosport and Alverstoke Lawn Tennis Club established the Gosport Tournament, that event ran until 1914 when it was discontinued due to World War One. In 1918 following the first world war the club revived the previous event under a new name called the Alverstoke Open Lawn Tennis Tournament. The tournament was not held during World War Two but resumed in 1947. The tournament was part of the ILTF Circuit and ended in 1981.

=== Men's Singles ===
(Incomplete roll) two editions of the men's event was staged in 1955 * July and the other ** August.

Year	Winner	Runner-up	Score
1919	(United Kingdom) C.H. Cole	(United Kingdom) Henry Dacre Stoker	6–3, 4–6, 6–1.
1920	(United Kingdom) C. Coppinger	(United Kingdom) J.R. Blake	6–3, 6–4.
1921	(United Kingdom) C. Coppinger (2)	(United Kingdom) Bernard Vernon-Harcourt	10–8, 8–6.
1922	(United Kingdom) N.A. Knox	(United Kingdom) Bernard Vernon-Harcourt	6–4, 3–6, 10–8.
1923	(United Kingdom) Henry Hunter	(United Kingdom) Bernard Vernon-Harcourt	6–0, 6–3.
1924	(United Kingdom) Henry Hunter (2)	(United Kingdom) Guy Jameson	8–6, 6–4.
1925	(United Kingdom) H.T.S. King	(United Kingdom) J. Gregg	6–2, 6–2.
1926	(United Kingdom) H.T.S. King (2)	(United Kingdom) John Pogson-Smith	6–3, 6–2.
1927	(United Kingdom) Philip Foster Glover	(United Kingdom) Roger Worthington	8–6, 6–2.
1928	(United Kingdom) Roger Worthington	(United Kingdom) Henry Dacre-Stoker	6–3, 6–1, 6–3.
1929	(United Kingdom) Guy Jameson	(United Kingdom) Roger Worthington	1–6, 8–6, 6–2, 12–10.
1930	(United Kingdom) H.A. Packer	(United Kingdom) Roger Worthington	8–10, 6–4, 6–2.
1931	(United Kingdom) Eric Conrad Peters	(United Kingdom) P. Giesen	6–2, 6–4.
1932	(United Kingdom) Eric Conrad Peters (2)	(Republic of Ireland) Edmund Mockler	6–0, 6–0.
1933	(United Kingdom) Eric Conrad Peters (3)	(United Kingdom) L.E. Bourke	6–2, 6–3 6–1.
1934	(United Kingdom) Eric Conrad Peters (4)	(United Kingdom) W.G. Agnew	6–1, 6–0.
1935	(United Kingdom) Eric Conrad Peters (5)	(United Kingdom) Tommy Anderson	6–4, 6–2.
1936	(United Kingdom) Denis Reginald Fussell	(United Kingdom) P.H. Sidney	6–2, 6–0.
1937	(United Kingdom) Eric Conrad Peters (6)	(United Kingdom) Walter Dermot Muspratt	6–2, 6–4.
1938	(United Kingdom) Eric Conrad Peters (7)	(United Kingdom) William Earle	6–3, 6–3.
1939	(United Kingdom) William Earle	(United Kingdom) A.G. Lloyd	7–5, 5–7, 6–0.
1940/1945	Not held (due to World War II)		
1947	(United Kingdom) R.G. Salmon	(United Kingdom) Walter Dermot Muspratt	3–6, 7–5, 6–1.
1948	(United Kingdom) K.G. Anson	(United Kingdom) Alfred Threfall	6–4, 6–3.
1949	(United Kingdom) D.S. Anderson	(United Kingdom) Gavin M. McColl	6–4, 7–5.
1950	(United Kingdom) David S. Anderton	(United Kingdom) Gavin M. McColl	7–5, 6–4.
1951	(United Kingdom) David S. Anderton (2)	(United Kingdom) Gavin M. McColl	6–3, 4–6, 13–11.
1952	(United Kingdom) Bill Threlfall	(United Kingdom) V.W. Langdon	6–2, 6–4.
1953	(United Kingdom) David S. Anderton (3)	(United Kingdom) Gavin M. McColl	6–4, 6–2.
1954	(United Kingdom) Gavin M. McColl	(United Kingdom) V.W. Langdon	6–2, 6–1.
1955 *	(United Kingdom) Colin Hannam	(United Kingdom) Alan Mills	5–7, 6–4, 6–4.
1955 **	(United Kingdom) Gavin M. McColl	(United Kingdom) V.W. Langdon	6–4, 6–3.
1956	(United Kingdom) Gavin M. McColl (2)	(United Kingdom) V.W. Langdon	6–4, 6–3.
1957	(United Kingdom) Ralph T. White	(United Kingdom) S. Roberts	6–1, 6–1.
1959	(United Kingdom) Ralph T. White (2)	(United Kingdom) H.M. Harvey	4–6, 6–2, 6–4.
1960	(United Kingdom) E. Chesterton	(United Kingdom) Gavin M. McColl	6–3, 4–6, 6–3.
1965	(United Kingdom) C.R. Trippe	(United Kingdom) G.R. Bone	6–2, 6–4.
↓ Open Era ↓
1969	(South Africa) Bryan Desatnic	(United Kingdom) R.E. Collings	5–7, 8–6, 6–1.
1970	(United Kingdom) Max Franklin	(United Kingdom) J. Webster	6–2, 6–3.
1971	(United Kingdom) Ashley Compton-Dando	(United Kingdom) A.P. Billingham	8–6, 6–4.
1972	(United Kingdom) Jasper Cooper	(United States) Bill Gatlin	8–9, 6–2, 6–2.
1973	(United Kingdom) Philip Siviter	(United Kingdom) Jasper Cooper	6–1, 9–7, 6–2.
1975	(United Kingdom) Jasper Cooper (2)	(United Kingdom) Robin Wallace	6–3, 6–3.
1977	(United Kingdom) T. Ferrier	(Israel) Roni Goldman	6–3, 6–3.
1978	(United Kingdom) T. Ferrier (2)	(United Kingdom) D. Emery	3–6, 6–3, 6–3.
1981	(Malaysia) Suresh Menon	(Malaysia) Rudy Foo	7–5, 6–2.

=== Women's Singles ===
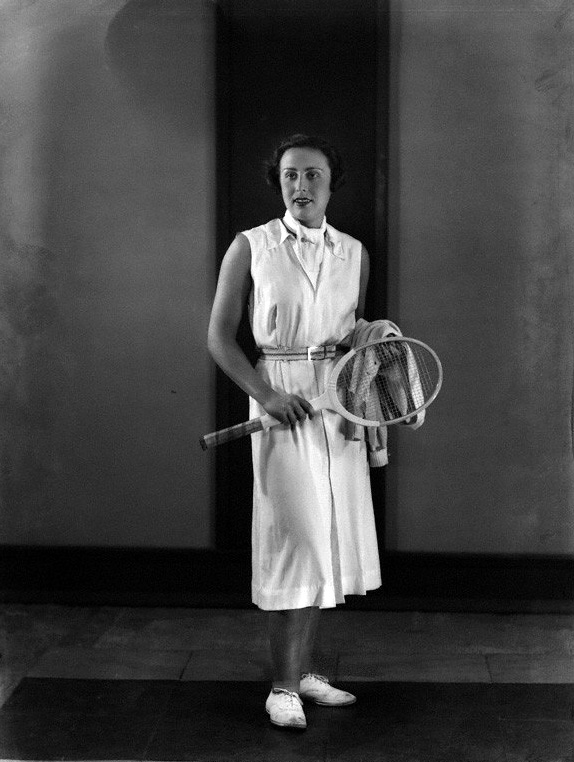
Susan Noel in 1935 won 2 singles titles.

(Incomplete roll)

Year	Winner	Runner-up	Score
1929	(United Kingdom) G A Rose	(United Kingdom) Sybil Stokes	7–5, 6–3
1932	(United Kingdom) Naomi Trentham	(United Kingdom) Sheila Hewitt	7–5, 3–6, 7–5.
1933	(United Kingdom) Effie Hemmant Peters	(United Kingdom) Betty Boas	6–3, 6–2
1934	(Republic of Ireland) D. Finigan	(United Kingdom) Betty Boas	7–5, 5–7, 6–2
1935	(United Kingdom) Effie Hemmant Peters (2)	(United Kingdom) N Truman	6–3, 6–8, 6–2
1938	(United Kingdom) Susan Noel	(United Kingdom) Effie Hemmant Peters	6–1, 6–2
1939	(United Kingdom) Susan Noel (2)	(United Kingdom) Jean Saunders	6–2, 6–1
1940/1945	Not held (due to World War II)		
1948	(United Kingdom) Peggy Townlee	(United Kingdom) Heather MacFarlane	6–3, 6–3
1950	(United Kingdom) Heather MacFarlane	(United Kingdom) Rose Leonard	6–4, 1–6, 6–2
1952	(United Kingdom) Rose Leonard	(United Kingdom) G. Newman	6–2, 6–1
↓ Open Era ↓
1970	(United Kingdom) Diane Riste	(United Kingdom) P. Hardgrave	6–0, 8–6
1971	(Rhodesia) Susan Hudson-Beck	(United Kingdom) Diane Riste	6–3, 6–2
1972	(United Kingdom) Diane Riste (2)	(United Kingdom) Betty Norman	9–7, 6–4
1973	(United Kingdom) Diane Riste (3)	(United Kingdom) Betty Norman	6–1, 6–2
1975	(United Kingdom) Diane Riste (4)	(United Kingdom) Betty Norman	6–3, 6–2
1977	(United Kingdom) Betty Norman	(United Kingdom) M. Bevan	7–5, 5–7, 6–4
1978	(United Kingdom) Betty Norman (2)	(United States) J. Kurz	7–5, 1–6, 7–5
1981	(United Kingdom) Kim Hotston	(United Kingdom) Betty Norman	2–6, 6–3, 9–7
