= George Caner =

American tennis player

George Colket Caner
- Full name: George Colket Caner
- Country (sports): United States
- Born: July 5, 1894 St. Davids, Pennsylvania, United States
- Died: June 23, 1984 (aged 89) Manchester, Massachusetts, United States
- Turned pro: 1910 (amateur tour)
- Retired: 1930

Singles

Grand Slam singles results
- Wimbledon: 3R (1922)
- US Open: SF (1920)

Doubles

Grand Slam doubles results
- Wimbledon: SF (1922)

Mixed doubles

Grand Slam mixed doubles results
- Wimbledon: 1R (1922)

George Caner (1894–1984) was an American tennis player.

Caner was often referred to as G. Colket Caner. After losing his opening match at the U. S. championships in 1910, Caner reached the last 16 in 1911. He lost early in 1912, 1913 and 1915. In 1920, Caner reached the semifinals, where he took a set off defending champion Bill Johnston. In the match between Johnston and Caner, Caner was the steadier player and fought hard, but Johnston was brilliant in patches, which were enough to see him to victory in four sets. The correspondent in The Brooklyn Daily Eagle commented that it was "astonishing that a player of Caner's ability has been able to reach the semi-finals of the national championship", concluding that the reason for this had been a "soft" draw. At Wimbledon 1922, Caner lost in the third round. Caner also played golf and football . He went to Harvard (where he excelled at tennis and was intercollegiate singles champion) and later during World war 1 enlisted in the Ambulance Corps.
