= Gladys Colston =

British tennis player

Gladys Colston, Lady Roundway
- Country (sports): United Kingdom
- Born: 4 September 1879; Brighton, England
- Died: 1 October 1969 (aged 90); London, England
- Plays: Left-handed

Singles

Grand Slam singles results
- Wimbledon: 3R (1922, 1923)

Doubles

Grand Slam doubles results
- Wimbledon: 3R (1923)

Blanche Gladys Colston, Lady Roundway (née du Bois Duddell, born 1879) was a British tennis player. She reached the third round at Wimbledon twice in 1922 and 1923, conceding walkovers in both instances. She was a runner-up at the British Covered Court Championships in 1902 and 1922, twenty years apart. She competed regularly in Germany in her early career.

Colston won a set in two 1913 finals against Suzanne Lenglen at tournaments in Wimereux and Le Touquet in northern France when Lenglen was 14 years old, making her one of the few players to win a set in multiple matches against Lenglen in singles. She defeated Lenglen in the mixed doubles finals at both of those tournaments, partnering with Triple World Champion Anthony Wilding in the latter event, making her one of the few players to defeat Lenglen in multiple matches.

== Personal life ==
She was born Blanche Gladys du Bois Duddell to George Duddell and Frances Kate du Bois. Her father was a property owner who became wealthy doing business in Hong Kong. Her mother was her father's great-niece. She had an older brother William Duddell who was a physicist and inventor. She married British Army officer Edward Murray Colston, 2nd Baron Roundway in 1904, thereby becoming Lady Roundway. They had one child, a daughter who died in an accident as a child after falling from a window.
