= 1922 Australasian Championships – Women's singles =

Women's singles
- 1922 Australasian Championships

Final
- Champion: (Australia) Mall Molesworth
- Runner-up: (Australia) Esna Boyd
- Score: 6–3, 10–8

Details
- Draw: 14
- Seeds: –

Events
Singles	men	women
Doubles	men	women	mixed
Australasian Championships	· 1923 →

Mall Molesworth defeated Esna Boyd 6–3, 10–8 in the final to win the women's singles tennis title at the 1922 Australasian Championships.

== Draw ==
=== Key ===
- Q = Qualifier
- WC = Wild card
- LL = Lucky loser
- r = Retired

1st round
(Australia) Mall Molesworth	7	6
(Australia) A. Gray	5	3
(Australia) Marjorie Mountain	6	6
(Australia) G. Stevens	4	3
(Australia) S. Carr	6	1	8
(Australia) -. Rock	2	6	6
(Australia) Gwen Utz	6	6
(Australia) -. Dodemaide	4	2
(Australia) Esna Boyd	6	6
(Australia) Floris St. George	4	1
(Australia) J. Watson	6	6
(Australia) -. Grant	3	2
(Australia) Sylvia Lance	6	6
(Australia) Lorna Bull	3	1

2nd round
(Australia) Mall Molesworth	6	6
(Australia) Marjorie Mountain	4	4
(Australia) S. Carr	w/o
(Australia) Gwen Utz
(Australia) Esna Boyd	6	6
(Australia) J. Watson	3	2
(Australia) Sylvia Lance	6	6
(Australia) M. Elliott	1	2

Semifinals
(Australia) Mall Molesworth	6	6
(Australia) Gwen Utz	2	3
(Australia) Esna Boyd	6	10
(Australia) Sylvia Lance	4	8

Final
(Australia) Mall Molesworth	6	10
(Australia) Esna Boyd	3	8

Preceded by 1921 U.S. National Championships – Women's singles	Grand Slam women's singles	Succeeded by 1922 Wimbledon Championships – Women's singles
