= 1922 Wimbledon Championships – Women's doubles =

Women's doubles
- 1922 Wimbledon Championships

Final
- Champions: (France) Suzanne Lenglen (United States) Elizabeth Ryan
- Runners-up: (United Kingdom) Kitty McKane (United Kingdom) Margaret Stocks
- Score: 6–0, 6–4

Details
- Draw: 32
- Seeds: –

Events
Singles	men	women		boys	girls
Doubles	men	women	mixed	boys	girls
← 1921 ·	Wimbledon Championships	· 1923 →

Suzanne Lenglen and Elizabeth Ryan successfully defended their title, defeating Kitty McKane and Margaret Stocks in the final, 6–0, 6–4 to win the ladies' doubles tennis title at the 1922 Wimbledon Championships.

== Draw ==
=== Key ===
- Q = Qualifier
- WC = Wild card
- LL = Lucky loser
- Alt = Alternate
- SE = Special exempt
- PR = Protected ranking
- ITF = ITF entry
- JE = Junior exempt
- w/o = Walkover
- r = Retired
- d = Defaulted
- SR = Special ranking

=== Finals ===
Semifinals
(United Kingdom) Dora Geen (United Kingdom) Winifred McNair	0	1
(France) Suzanne Lenglen (United States) Elizabeth Ryan	6	6
(United Kingdom) Dorothy Holman (United Kingdom) Helen Leisk	w/o
(United Kingdom) Kitty McKane (United Kingdom) Margaret Stocks

Final
(France) Suzanne Lenglen (United States) Elizabeth Ryan	6	6
(United Kingdom) Kitty McKane (United Kingdom) Margaret Stocks	0	4

=== Top half ===
First round
(United Kingdom) NQ Radcliffe-Platt (United Kingdom) PM Radcliffe	3	6	6
(France) Elizabeth Macready (United Kingdom) Violet Pinckney	6	3	2
(New Zealand) Marjorie Bain (France) D Fenwick
(United Kingdom) AM Hogg (United Kingdom) Jessie Walker	w/o
(United Kingdom) Mabel Clayton (United Kingdom) Doris Craddock	5	4
(United Kingdom) Winifred Beamish (United Kingdom) Phyllis Satterthwaite	7	6
(United Kingdom) Ermyntrude Harvey (United Kingdom) Mrs CE Hunter	6	5	1
(United Kingdom) Dora Geen (United Kingdom) Winifred McNair	3	7	6
(United Kingdom) Dorothy Kemmis-Betty (United Kingdom) Mabel Parton	2	4
(United Kingdom) Eleanor Rose (United Kingdom) Vera Youle	6	6
(United Kingdom) Enid Head (United Kingdom) Peggy Ingram	6	6
(United Kingdom) Mrs WL Hollick (United Kingdom) Cecily Marriott	3	3
(France) Suzanne Lenglen (United States) Elizabeth Ryan	6	6
(United Kingdom) Aurea Edgington (United Kingdom) Hazel Hogarth	0	1
(South Africa) Mrs MF Ellis (United Kingdom) Mrs Johnstone-Brown	4	1
(United Kingdom) Molly Welsh (United Kingdom) Mrs HB Weston	6	6

Second round
(United Kingdom) NQ Radcliffe-Platt (United Kingdom) PM Radcliffe
(New Zealand) M Bain (France) D Fenwick	w/o
(United Kingdom) W Beamish (United Kingdom) P Satterthwaite	3	4
(United Kingdom) D Geen (United Kingdom) W McNair	6	6
(United Kingdom) E Rose (United Kingdom) V Youle	6	6
(United Kingdom) E Head (United Kingdom) M Ingram	4	1
(France) S Lenglen (United States) E Ryan	6	6
(United Kingdom) M Welsh (United Kingdom) Mrs HB Weston	1	0

Quarterfinals
(United Kingdom) NQ Radcliffe-Platt (United Kingdom) PM Radcliffe	w/o
(United Kingdom) D Geen (United Kingdom) W McNair
(United Kingdom) E Rose (United Kingdom) V Youle	5	2
(France) S Lenglen (United States) E Ryan	7	6

Semifinals
(United Kingdom) D Geen (United Kingdom) W McNair	0	1
(France) S Lenglen (United States) E Ryan	6	6

=== Bottom half ===
First round
(United Kingdom) EM Stokes (United Kingdom) EZ Stokes	6	4	6
(United Kingdom) Louise Bull (United Kingdom) Ariadne Rodocanachi	2	6	3
(United Kingdom) Peggy Dransfield (United Kingdom) Norah Middleton
(United Kingdom) Mildred Coles (United Kingdom) Ruth Winch	w/o
(United Kingdom) Mrs AA Hall (United Kingdom) Mrs Perrett	3	3
(United Kingdom) C Rimington (United Kingdom) Mrs FS Warburg	6	6
(United Kingdom) Dorothy Holman (United Kingdom) Helen Leisk	6	6
(United Kingdom) Annie Cobb (United Kingdom) Olive Manser	3	2
(United States) Molla Mallory (United States) Edith Sigourney	2	1
(United Kingdom) Dorothea Lambert Chambers (South Africa) Irene Peacock	6	6
(United Kingdom) Joy Coote (United Kingdom) Mrs HV Parbury	6	8
(United Kingdom) Evelyn Colyer (United Kingdom) Mrs J O'Neill	4	6
(United Kingdom) Sylvia Lumley-Ellis (United Kingdom) MS Scott	2	2
(United Kingdom) Kitty McKane (United Kingdom) Margaret Stocks	6	6
(United Kingdom) WM Haughton (United Kingdom) Mrs RRW Jackson	6	6
(United Kingdom) ML Stevenson (United Kingdom) PM Stevenson	4	3

Second round
(United Kingdom) EM Stokes (United Kingdom) EZ Stokes	6	1	4
(United Kingdom) PH Dransfield (United Kingdom) N Middleton	4	6	6
(United Kingdom) C Rimington (United Kingdom) Mrs FS Warburg	1	3
(United Kingdom) D Holman (United Kingdom) H Leisk	6	6
(United Kingdom) D Lambert Chambers (South Africa) I Peacock	6	6
(United Kingdom) J Coote (United Kingdom) Mrs HV Parbury	3	2
(United Kingdom) K McKane (United Kingdom) M Stocks	6	7
(United Kingdom) WM Haughton (United Kingdom) Mrs RRW Jackson	1	5

Quarterfinals
(United Kingdom) P Dransfield (United Kingdom) N Middleton	w/o
(United Kingdom) D Holman (United Kingdom) H Leisk
(United Kingdom) D Lambert Chambers (South Africa) I Peacock	4	6	0
(United Kingdom) K McKane (United Kingdom) M Stocks	6	3	6

Semifinals
(United Kingdom) D Holman (United Kingdom) H Leisk	w/o
(United Kingdom) K McKane (United Kingdom) M Stocks
