= Eduardo Flaquer =

Spanish tennis player (1896–1951)

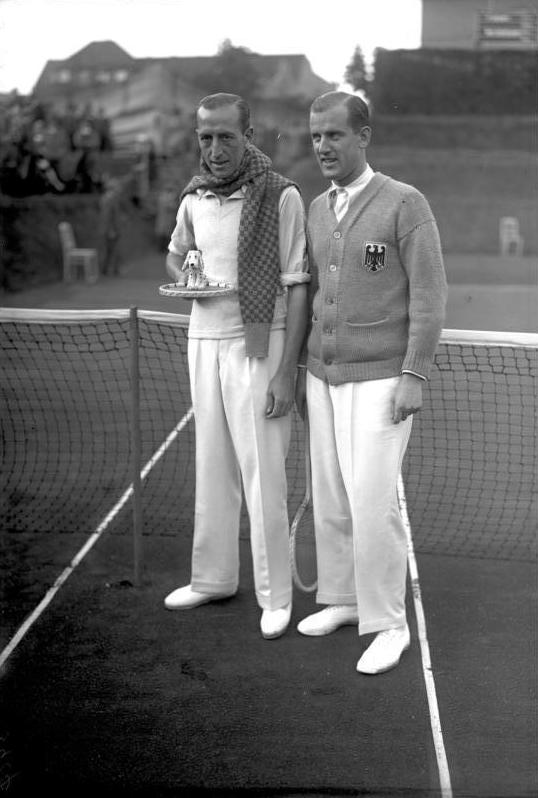
- Flaquer (left) with German tennis player Hans Moldenhauer, 1928 Davis Cup match
- Full name: Eduardo Flaquer Vázquez
- Country (sports): Spain
- Born: 4 September 1894; Barcelona, Spain
- Died: 18 August 1951 (aged 56); Zumaya, Spain

Singles

Grand Slam singles results
- French Open: QF (1925)
- Wimbledon: 4R (1922)

Other tournaments
- WHCC: 4R (1923)
- WCCC: 2R (1923)
- Olympic Games: 2R (1924)

Doubles

Grand Slam doubles results
- Wimbledon: F (1923)
- Olympic Games: 3R (1924)

Mixed doubles
- Olympic Games: QF (1924)

Eduardo Flaquer Vázquez (4 November 1896 – 18 August 1951) was a Spanish tennis player who represented Spain in the Davis Cup and Olympic Games. He competed in the singles event at the 1924 Summer Olympics, reaching the second round in which he lost to Jean Washer. With compatriot Ricardo Saprissa he competed in the men's doubles event and reached the third round. In the mixed doubles he teamed up with compatriot Lilí Álvarez and reached the quarterfinal.

He competed in the 1922 Wimbledon Championships and reached the fourth round of the singles event in which he lost to Pat O'Hara Wood. In the 1923 Wimbledon Championships he reached the final of the doubles event with Manuel de Gomar.

== Grand Slam finals ==
=== Doubles (1 runner-up) ===
Result	Year	Championship	Surface	Partner	Opponents	Score
Loss	1923	Wimbledon	Grass	(Spain) Manuel de Gomar	(United Kingdom) Leslie Godfree (United Kingdom) Randolph Lycett	3–6, 4–6, 6–3, 3–6
