= 1922 Wimbledon Championships – Women's singles =

Women's singles
- 1922 Wimbledon Championships

Final
- Champion: (France) Suzanne Lenglen
- Runner-up: (United States) Molla Mallory
- Score: 6–2, 6–0

Details
- Draw: 64
- Seeds: –

Events
Singles	men	women		boys	girls
Doubles	men	women	mixed	boys	girls
← 1921 ·	Wimbledon Championships	· 1923 →

Three-time defending champion Suzanne Lenglen defeated Molla Mallory in the final, 6–2, 6–0 to win the ladies' singles tennis title at the 1922 Wimbledon Championships. The final lasted only 23 minutes, the quickest singles final match in the history of the tournament.

== Draw ==
=== Key ===
- Q = Qualifier
- WC = Wild card
- LL = Lucky loser
- Alt = Alternate
- SE = Special exempt
- PR = Protected ranking
- ITF = ITF entry
- JE = Junior exempt
- w/o = Walkover
- r = Retired
- d = Defaulted
- SR = Special ranking

=== Finals ===
Quarterfinals
(United States) Elizabeth Ryan	1	6
(France) Suzanne Lenglen	6	8
(United Kingdom) Peggy Dransfield	2	2
(South Africa) Irene Peacock	6	6
(United Kingdom) Mrs IFL Elliot	6	1
(United Kingdom) Winifred Beamish	8	6
(United Kingdom) Aurea Edgington	2	4
(United States) Molla Mallory	6	6

Semifinals
(France) Suzanne Lenglen	6	6
(South Africa) Irene Peacock	4	1
(United Kingdom) Winifred Beamish	2	2
(United States) Molla Mallory	6	6

Final
(France) Suzanne Lenglen	6	6
(United States) Molla Mallory	2	0

=== Top half ===
==== Section 1 ====
First round
(United States) Elizabeth Ryan	6	6
(United Kingdom) Enid Head	3	0
(United Kingdom) Winifred McNair	8	6
(United Kingdom) Olive Manser	6	1
(United Kingdom) Ermyntrude Harvey	7	4	6
(United Kingdom) Mrs RRW Jackson	5	6	2
(France) D Fenwick	6	4	4
(United Kingdom) Mrs Rawson-Wood	1	6	6
(United Kingdom) ML Stevenson	3	5
(United Kingdom) Evelyn Colyer	6	7
(United Kingdom) Sylvia Lumley-Ellis	6	4
(United Kingdom) PM Stevenson	8	6
(United Kingdom) Kitty McKane	6	6
(United States) Eleonora Sears	1	0
(France) Suzanne Lenglen	6	6
(South Africa) Mrs MF Ellis	0	0

Second round
(United States) E Ryan	4	6	6
(United Kingdom) W McNair	6	3	0
(United Kingdom) E Harvey	6	6
(United Kingdom) Mrs Rawson-Wood	2	1
(United Kingdom) E Colyer	6	6
(United Kingdom) PM Stevenson	3	3
(United Kingdom) K McKane	1	5
(France) S Lenglen	6	7

Third round
(United States) E Ryan	6	6
(United Kingdom) E Harvey	3	3
(United Kingdom) E Colyer	0	0
(France) S Lenglen	6	6

Quarterfinals
(United States) E Ryan	1	6
(France) S Lenglen	6	8

==== Section 2 ====
First round
(United Kingdom) Mrs Anstey
(United Kingdom) Ruth Winch	w/o
(United Kingdom) Blanche Colston	6	6
(United Kingdom) Peggy Ingram	3	4
(United Kingdom) Annie Cobb	w/o
(United Kingdom) Peggy Dransfield
(United Kingdom) Helen Leisk	8	6
(United Kingdom) Molly Welsh	6	2
(United Kingdom) Norah Middleton	8	6	6
(United Kingdom) Mrs HC Hextall	6	8	1
(United Kingdom) Mildred Coles	2	1
(South Africa) Irene Peacock	6	6
(France) Elizabeth Macready	6	2	6
(United Kingdom) Mrs AA Hall	3	6	2
(United Kingdom) Dorothy Holman	6	6
(United Kingdom) Violet Pinckney	1	2

Second round
(United Kingdom) Mrs Anstey	2	6	3
(United Kingdom) B Colston	6	3	6
(United Kingdom) P Dransfield	8	2	6
(United Kingdom) H Leisk	6	6	4
(United Kingdom) N Middleton	2	0
(South Africa) I Peacock	6	6
(France) E Macready	3	0
(United Kingdom) D Holman	6	6

Third round
(United Kingdom) B Colston	w/o
(United Kingdom) P Dransfield
(South Africa) I Peacock	7	6
(United Kingdom) D Holman	5	0

Quarterfinals
(United Kingdom) P Dransfield	6	6
(South Africa) I Peacock	2	2

=== Bottom half ===
==== Section 3 ====
First round
(United Kingdom) C Rimington	6	3	6
(United States) Edith Sigourney	4	6	4
(United Kingdom) Mrs IFL Elliot	6	6
(United Kingdom) Mrs Johnstone-Brown	2	2
(United Kingdom) Mrs JB Perrett	5	6	2
(United Kingdom) Madeline O'Neill	7	3	6
(United Kingdom) Louise Bull	8	6
(Belgium) Pauline Alison	6	1
(United Kingdom) Ariadne Rodocanachi	6	6
(India) Mrs ES Graham	4	4
(United Kingdom) Winifred Beamish	6	6
(United Kingdom) Dorothy Kemmis-Betty	2	4
(United Kingdom) Mrs HB Weston	2	6	7
(United Kingdom) WM Haughton	6	3	5
(New Zealand) Marjorie Bain	0	0
(United Kingdom) Margaret Stocks	6	6

Second round
(United Kingdom) C Rimington	5	3
(United Kingdom) Mrs IFL Elliot	7	6
(United Kingdom) M O'Neill	6	8
(United Kingdom) L Bull	2	6
(United Kingdom) A Rodocanachi	2	2
(United Kingdom) W Beamish	6	6
(United Kingdom) Mrs HB Weston	6	6
(United Kingdom) M Stocks	4	4

Third round
(United Kingdom) Mrs IFL Elliot	6	6
(United Kingdom) M O'Neill	4	3
(United Kingdom) W Beamish	6	6
(United Kingdom) Mrs HB Weston	3	4

Quarterfinals
(United Kingdom) Mrs IFL Elliot	6	1
(United Kingdom) W Beamish	8	6

==== Section 4 ====
First round
(United Kingdom) MS Scott	5	5
(United Kingdom) Vera Youle	7	7
(United Kingdom) Doris Craddock	1	0
(United Kingdom) Aurea Edgington	6	6
(United Kingdom) AM Hogg	3	4
(United Kingdom) EZ Stokes	6	6
(United States) Eleanor Goss	2	0
(United Kingdom) Eleanor Rose	6	6
(United Kingdom) Mabel Parton	6	6
(United Kingdom) Mrs Bruce-May	2	4
(United Kingdom) Jessie Walker	0	6	1
(United Kingdom) Phyllis Satterthwaite	6	3	6
(India) Mrs WP Keays	0	3
(United States) Molla Mallory	6	6
(United Kingdom) Joan Hextall	3	3
(United Kingdom) Mrs WL Hollick	6	6

Second round
(United Kingdom) V Youle	2	3
(United Kingdom) A Edgington	6	6
(United Kingdom) EZ Stokes	5	1
(United Kingdom) E Rose	7	6
(United Kingdom) M Parton	6	6
(United Kingdom) P Satterthwaite	4	1
(United States) M Mallory	6	6
(United Kingdom) Mrs WL Hollick	1	2

Third round
(United Kingdom) A Edgington	6	3	6
(United Kingdom) E Rose	1	6	3
(United Kingdom) M Parton	2	1
(United States) M Mallory	6	6

Quarterfinals
(United Kingdom) A Edgington	2	4
(United States) M Mallory	6	6

Preceded by 1922 Australasian Championships – Women's singles	Grand Slam women's singles	Succeeded by 1922 U.S. National Championships – Women's singles
