= Ben Sherwell =

English cricketer

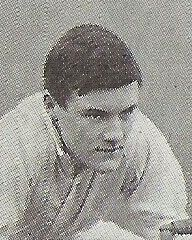
Sherwell in 1926

Noel Benjamin "Ben" Sherwell (16 March 1904 – 29 December 1960) was an English first-class cricketer active 1923–39 who played 36 First-class matches for Middlesex and University of Cambridge. He was born in Hendon, educated at Tonbridge School and Gonville and Caius College, Cambridge. He died near Chur in Switzerland.
