= 1922 Australasian Championships – Men's singles =

Men's singles
- 1922 Australasian Championships

Final
- Champion: (Australia) James Anderson
- Runner-up: (Australia) Gerald Patterson
- Score: 6–0, 3–6, 3–6, 6–3, 6–2

Events
Singles	men	women
Doubles	men	women	mixed
- Australasian Championships

James Anderson defeated Gerald Patterson 6–0, 3–6, 3–6, 6–3, 6–2 in the final to win the men's singles tennis title at the 1922 Australasian Championships.

== Draw ==
=== Key ===
- Q = Qualifier
- WC = Wild card
- LL = Lucky loser
- r = Retired

Quarterfinals
(Australia) James Anderson	7	6	6
(Australia) Wilfred Bruce Dive	5	4	3
(Australia) Norman Peach	6	6	9
(Australia) Jack Clemenger	1	1	7
(Australia) Jack Hawkes	w/o
(Australia) Andrew Robert Huthnance
(Australia) E. L. Jones	4	7	1	8
(Australia) Gerald Patterson	6	5	6	10

Semifinals
(Australia) James Anderson	1	6	6	6
(Australia) Norman Peach	6	2	2	4
(Australia) Jack Hawkes	6	6	5	6	8
(Australia) Gerald Patterson	8	4	7	3	10

Finals
(Australia) James Anderson	6	3	3	6	6
(Australia) Gerald Patterson	0	6	6	3	2

=== Earlier rounds ===
==== Section 1 ====
First round
(Australia) North	6	6	8
(Australia) Sheehan	2	3	6

Second round
(Australia) Anderson	6	3	6	6
(Australia) North	1	6	2	2
(Australia) Gemmell	6	6	6
(Australia) Lawrie	3	3	4
(Australia) Poulton	6	6	6
(Australia) Goodman	4	4	2
(Australia) Dive	6	6	6
(Australia) J. Willard	0	0	0

Third round
(Australia) Anderson	6	6	6
(Australia) Gemmell	2	2	2
(Australia) Poulton	3	4	1
(Australia) Dive	6	6	6

Quarterfinals
(Australia) Anderson	7	6	6
(Australia) Dive	5	4	3

==== Section 2 ====
First round

Second round
(Australia) Peach	6	6	6
(Australia) Jordan	4	2	3
(Australia) Wertheim	6	6	6
(Australia) Jencken	2	2	1
(Australia) T. Cummings	6	3	6	6
(Australia) Varley	1	6	2	1
(Australia) Clemenger	6	6	6
(Australia) Utz	2	2	2

Third round
(Australia) Peach	14	2	6	13	6
(Australia) Wertheim	16	6	4	11	0
(Australia) T. Cummings	2	6	3	2
(Australia) Clemenger	6	1	6	6

Quarterfinals
(Australia) Peach	6	6	9
(Australia) Clemenger	1	1	7

==== Section 3 ====
First round
(Australia) Hawkes	6	6	6
(Australia) Goodman	3	2	1
(Australia) Sandrai	6	6	6
(Australia) Buchanan	4	1	1

Second round
(Australia) Hawkes	6	7	6
(Australia) Sandrai	1	5	2
(Australia) Baker	9	6	6
(Australia) Henderson	7	1	3
(Australia) A. Willard	6	6	2	6
(Australia) Fitzgerald	3	4	6	4
(Australia) Huthnance	1	6	7	6
(Australia) Bullough	6	2	5	3

Third round
(Australia) Hawkes	6	7	7
(Australia) Baker	1	5	5
(Australia) A. Willard	7	9	4	1
(Australia) Huthnance	5	11	6	6

Quarterfinals
(Australia) Hawkes	w/o
(Australia) Huthnance

==== Section 4 ====
First round

Second round
(Australia) E. L. Jones	6	6	6
(Australia) Cross	3	1	1
(Australia) G. Pearson	6	0	3	1
(Australia) Jack Cummings	1	6	6	6

Third round
(Australia) E. L. Jones	6	6	6
(Australia) Jack Cummings	1	4	3
(Australia) Bonnington	6	0	3	1
(Australia) Patterson	1	6	6	6

Quarterfinals
(Australia) E. L. Jones	4	7	1	8
(Australia) Patterson	6	5	6	10

Preceded by 1921 U.S. National Championships	Grand Slam men's singles	Succeeded by 1922 Wimbledon Championships
