= Gerald Sherwell =

South African tennis player

- Full name: Gerald Raleigh Sherwell
- Country (sports): South Africa
- Born: 12 May 1889; Transvaal, South Africa
- Died: 29 May 1975 (aged 86); Kent, England
- Plays: Right-handed

Singles

Grand Slam singles results
- Wimbledon: 4R (1921)

Doubles

Grand Slam doubles results
- Wimbledon: QF (1923)

Grand Slam mixed doubles results
- Wimbledon: QF (1920)

Gerald Raleigh Sherwell (12 May 1889 – 29 May 1975) was a South African tennis player.

One of ten brothers, Sherwell was born in Transvaal. An elder brother, Percy, captained South Africa in Test cricket and one of his younger brothers, Ben, played first-class cricket for Cambridge University. Two of his brothers were killed in action in World War I. Their father, Thomas Yeo Sherwell, was a developer from the English town of Yeovil, who came to South Africa after the discovery of gold. The modern day Johannesburg suburb of Yeoville is named after him.

Sherwell was married to Ethel Constance in 1915.

Active in the 1920s and 1930s, Sherwell made the singles fourth round of the 1921 Wimbledon Championships and was a two-time doubles quarter-finalist. In 1926 he represented South Africa in a Davis Cup tie against Sweden in London. He was also a competitive badminton player and made several appearances at the All England Championships.

== See also ==
- List of South Africa Davis Cup team representatives
