= Cecil Campbell (tennis) =

Irish tennis player

- Full name: Cecil James Frederick Campbell
- Country (sports): Ireland
- Born: 4 May 1891 Dublin, Ireland
- Died: 11 May 1952 (aged 61) Cairo, Egypt

Grand Slam singles results
- Wimbledon: QF (1921, 1922, 1923)

Grand Slam doubles results
- Wimbledon: 2R (1921, 1922, 1923, 1927)

Grand Slam mixed doubles results
- Wimbledon: 3R (1922, 1928)

Team competitions
- Davis Cup: QF^{Eu} (1923)

Lieutenant-Colonel The Hon. Sir Cecil James Frederick Campbell KBE CMG (4 May 1891 – 11 May 1952) was an amateur Irish tennis player, lawyer and businessman. He reached the quarterfinals of Wimbledon for three consecutive years between 1921 and 1923.

== Biography ==
He was the second son of Irish peer James Campbell, 1st Baron Glenavy, who served as Attorney-General for Ireland and Lord Chief Justice of Ireland. Cecil was considered the best Irish tennis player of his era.

On 23 May 1925 in London, Campbell married Lavender Letts, a fellow tennis player from Essex. She competed for Ireland in women's singles at the 1929 Wimbledon Championships, and they competed together in mixed doubles at Wimbledon in 1928 and 1929.

Campbell moved to Egypt in 1922, where until 1930 he served as legal secretary to the Financial Adviser to the Egyptian Government. He later became legal counsellor to the British resident in Cairo. In 1933, he became managing director of the Marconi Radio Telephone Company of Egypt, and later chairman of the local board of Anglo-Egyptian Oilfields.

In 1934, Lavender successfully sued for divorce on the grounds of her husband's adultery with the wife of a British civil servant in Cairo. Cecil remarried the same year.

He was named a Companion of the Order of St Michael and St George in the 1930 New Year Honours After his service in the Second World War, he received a knighthood.

From 1947 to the time of his death, he was president of the English Chamber of Commerce in Egypt.

On 11 May 1952, he was found dead of a gunshot wound at his home in Zamalek, Cairo, after suffering "indifferent health for a long time," according to The Times.
