= 1922 Wimbledon Championships =

- Date: 26 June – 10 July
- Edition: 42nd
- Category: Grand Slam
- Surface: Grass
- Location: Church Road; SW19, Wimbledon, London, United Kingdom
- Venue: All England Lawn Tennis and Croquet Club

Champions

Men's singles
- (Australia) Gerald Patterson

Women's singles
- (France) Suzanne Lenglen

Men's doubles
- (Australia) James Anderson / (United Kingdom) Randolph Lycett

Women's doubles
- (France) Suzanne Lenglen / (United States) Elizabeth Ryan

Mixed doubles
- (Australia) Pat O'Hara-Wood / (France) Suzanne Lenglen
- Wimbledon Championships

The 1922 Wimbledon Championships were the 42nd edition of the prestigious tennis tournament, held at the All England Lawn Tennis and Croquet Club in Wimbledon, London in the United Kingdom. The tournament ran from 26 June until 10 July. It was the 42nd staging of the Wimbledon Championships, and the first Grand Slam tennis event of 1922.

This edition of Wimbledon was historically important as being the first in which all defending champions were required to play in the main draw. Previously, the Gentlemen's Singles, Ladies' Singles, and Gentlemen's Doubles used a system known as the Challenge Round, in which the reigning champions were granted an automatic bye into the final while all other competitors played in a tournament to determine the final opponent.

It was the first Championships played at the present site in Church Road.

== Finals ==
=== Men's singles ===
(Australia) Gerald Patterson defeated (United Kingdom) Randolph Lycett, 6–3, 6–4, 6–2

=== Women's singles ===
(France) Suzanne Lenglen defeated (United States) Molla Mallory, 6–2, 6–0

=== Men's doubles ===
(Australia) James Anderson / (United Kingdom) Randolph Lycett defeated (Australia) Gerald Patterson / (Australia) Pat O'Hara Wood, 3–6, 7–9, 6–4, 6–3, 11–9

=== Women's doubles ===
(France) Suzanne Lenglen / (United States) Elizabeth Ryan defeated (United Kingdom) Kitty McKane / (United Kingdom) Margaret Stocks, 6–0, 6–4

=== Mixed doubles ===
(Australia) Pat O'Hara Wood / (France) Suzanne Lenglen defeated (United Kingdom) Randolph Lycett / (United States) Elizabeth Ryan, 6–4, 6–3

Preceded by 1921 Australasian Championships	Grand Slams	Succeeded by 1922 U.S. National Championships
