= Edith Sigourney =

American tennis player

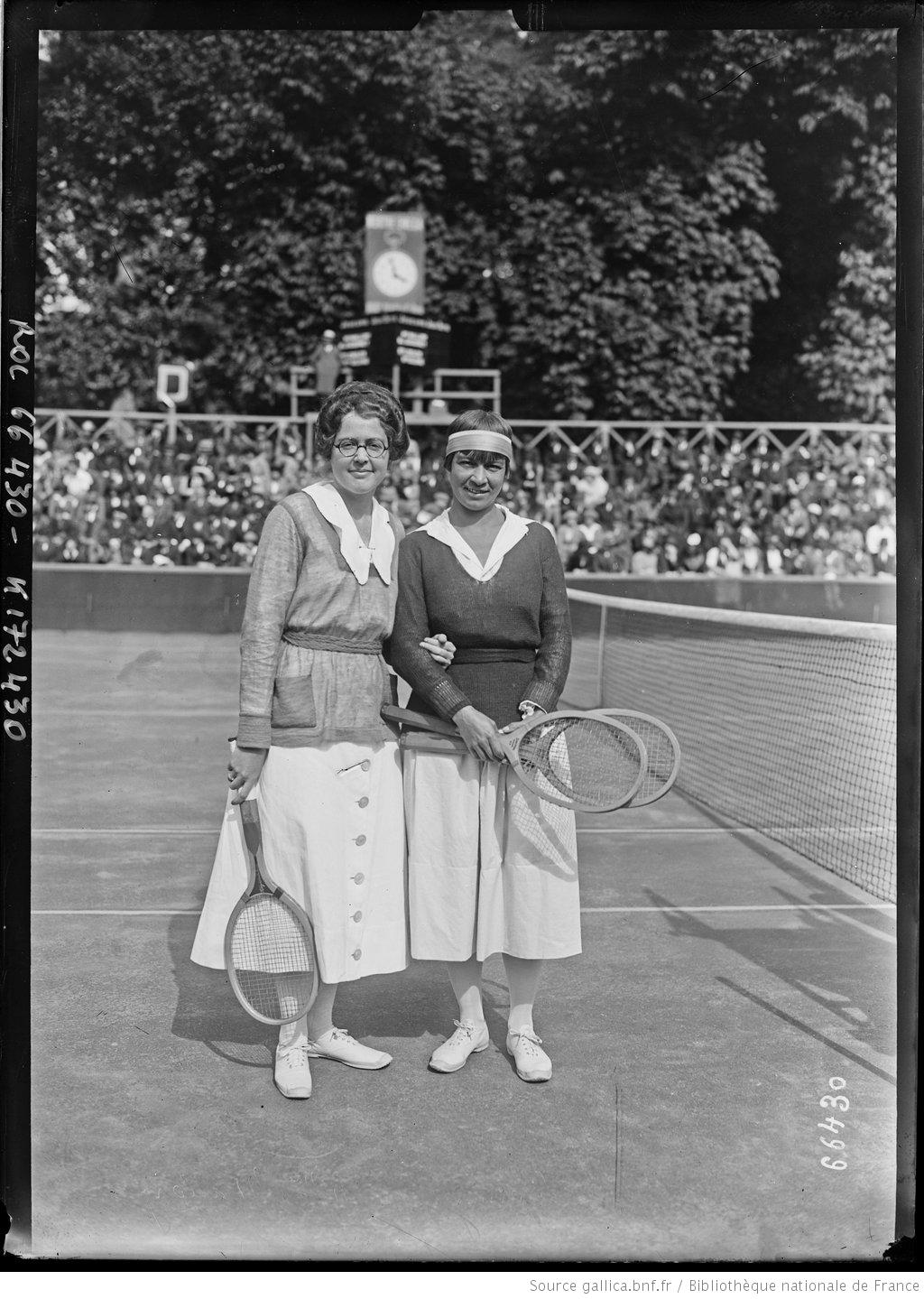
- Sigourney (l.) with Molla Mallory at the 1921 World Hard Court Championships
- Full name: Edith P. Sigourney
- Country (sports): United States
- Born: May 15, 1895 Boston, Massachusetts, U.S.
- Died: December 2, 1982 (aged 87) Lynn, Massachusetts, U.S.

Grand Slam singles results
- Wimbledon: 1R (1921, 1922, 1924)
- US Open: QF (1920, 1922)

Grand Slam doubles results
- Wimbledon: 2R (1921, 1924)
- US Open: F (1922)

Grand Slam mixed doubles results
- Wimbledon: 2R (1921, 1924)
- US Open: QF (1923)

Edith Sigourney (May 15, 1895 – December 2, 1982) was an American tennis player during the 1920s.

== Biography ==
Edith Sigourney was born in Boston, Massachusetts in 1895. She and her five siblings grew up at the family's home on Beacon Street. She learned to play tennis at the Nahant tennis club where the family spent their summers.

Sigourney's best result at the U.S. Championships was the quarterfinals, which she reached twice, in 1920 and 1922. In doubles, she was a finalist alongside Molla Mallory in 1922, where they lost to Marion Zinderstein and Helen Wills in three sets. She was within the US national top ten in 1920 (no. 8), 1923 (no. 7) and 1925 (no. 10).

Sigourney crossed the Atlantic three times to play at the Wimbledon Championships in 1921, 1923 and 1924, but lost her initial match in each year. In 1921, she also played at the World Hard Court Championships at Paris.

In 1928, she won the U.S. Indoor Championships.

Along with Hazel Wightman, she won the National Senior Doubles Championships five times in between 1940 and 1947.

She later moved to Nahant, and lived there until her death in 1982.

Sigourney was inducted into the New England Tennis Hall of Fame in 1999.

== Grand Slam finals ==
=== Doubles: (1 runner-up) ===
Result	Year	Championship	Surface	Partner	Opponents	Score
Loss	1922	U.S. Championships	Grass	(United States) Molla Mallory	(United States) Helen Wills (United States) Marion Zinderstein	4–6, 9–7, 3–6
