= Margaret Stocks =

English badminton and tennis player

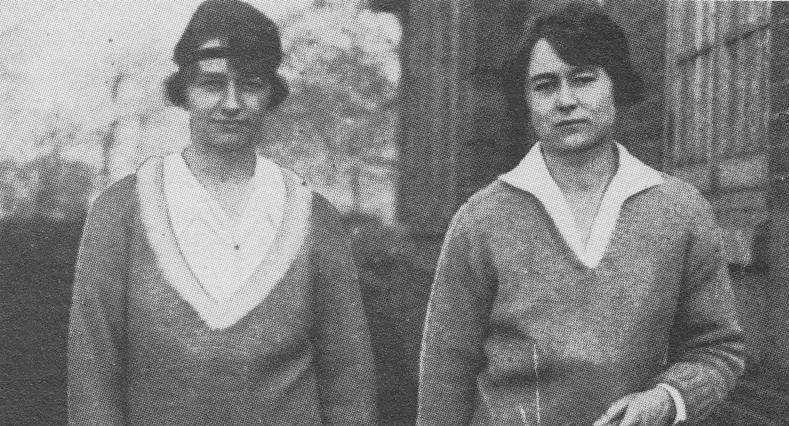

Personal information
- Born: 26 April 1895 Paddington, London
- Died: 1 January 1985 (aged 89) Shepway, Kent

Sport
- Country: England
- Sport: Badminton

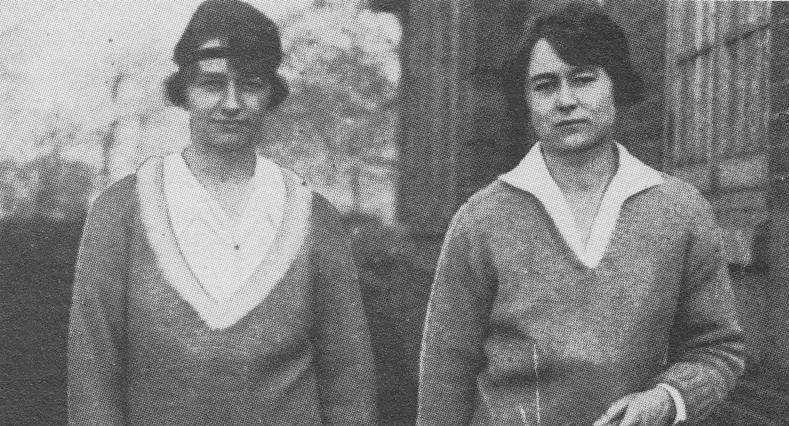
Kitty and Margaret McKane 1921

Margaret Stocks née Margaret McKane (1895–1985) was an English badminton and tennis player. She was born in London in 1895, and she married Andrew Denys Stocks in 1921. She came to prominence the same year when winning the All England women's doubles badminton title with her younger sister Kitty McKane. The following year, the sisters reached the 1922 Wimbledon Championships women's doubles final, losing to Suzanne Lenglen and Elizabeth Ryan. The sisters won an All England badminton doubles title in 1924, and Stocks became the singles champion in 1925.

== Medal record at the All England Badminton Championships ==
Medal	Year	Event
Gold medal – first place	1921	Women's doubles
Gold medal – first place	1924	Women's doubles
Gold medal – first place	1925	Women's singles

== Grand Slam finals ==
=== Doubles (1 runner-up) ===
Result	Year	Championship	Surface	Partner	Opponents	Score
Loss	1921	Wimbledon	Grass	(United Kingdom) Kitty McKane	(France) Suzanne Lenglen (United States) Elizabeth Ryan	0–6, 4–6
