= Marjorie Mountain =

Australian tennis player

Marjorie Mountain was an Australian tennis player.

== Grand slam finals ==
Marjorie Mountain reached the final in women's doubles in the inaugural Australian Championship 1922 with Esna Boyd and they defeated Gwen Utz and Floris St. George 1–6, 6–4, 7–5 to win the title. She also she reached semifinals of the Australian Open in the Mixed doubles with Roy Wertheim in the same year
