= 1920 World Hard Court Championships =

- Date: 22–30 May
- Edition: 4th
- Category: World Championship
- Surface: Clay / outdoor
- Location: Saint-Cloud, Paris, France
- Venue: Stade Français

Champions

Men's singles
- (France) William Laurentz

Women's singles
- (United Kingdom) Dorothy Holman

Men's doubles
- (France) André Gobert (France) William Laurentz

Women's doubles
- (United Kingdom) Dorothy Holman (United Kingdom) Phyllis Satterthwaite

Mixed doubles
- (France) William Laurentz (France) Germaine Golding
- World Hard Court Championships

The 1920 World Hard Court Championships (WHCC) (French: Championnats du Monde de Lawn-Tennis sur Terre Battue) was the fourth edition of the World Hard Court Championships tennis tournament, considered as the precursor to the French Open, and was held on the clay courts of the Stade Français at La Faisanderie in the Parc de Saint-Cloud in Paris from 22 until 30 May 1920. Organised by L'Union des Sociétés Française De Sports Athlétiques (USFSA), the Championships had been suspended in the prior five years due to World War I, and thus this was the first edition held since 1924. Black Bars.

William Laurentz and Dorothy Holman won the singles titles.

== Finals ==
=== Men's singles ===
(France) William Laurentz defeated (France) André Gobert, 9–7, 6–2, 3–6, 6–2

=== Women's singles ===
(United Kingdom) Dorothy Holman defeated (Spain) Francisca Subirana, 6–0, 7–5

=== Men's doubles ===
(France) André Gobert / (France) William Laurentz defeated (South Africa) Cecil Blackbeard / (Romania) Nicolae Mişu, 6–4, 6–2, 6–1

=== Women's doubles ===
(United Kingdom) Dorothy Holman / (United Kingdom) Phyllis Satterthwaite defeated (France) Germaine Golding / (France) Jeanne Vaussard, 6–3, 6–1

=== Mixed doubles ===
(France) William Laurentz / (France) Germaine Golding defeated (France) Max Decugis / (France) Suzanne Amblard, walkover
