= French Covered Court Championships =

French Covered Court Championships Championnats de France sur Court Couvert

Defunct tennis tournament
- Tour: Pre-open era (1877–1967)
- Founded: 1895
- Abolished: 1971
- Editions: 69
- Location: Paris, France
- Venue: Tennis Club de Paris, 1895-1946, 1951-60, 1962, 1964, 1967-71; Lyon; 1947-48, 1961, 1963, 1968
- Surface: Wood (indoor)

The French Covered Court Championships its original name or Championnats de France sur Court Couvert also known as the French Covered Court Open Championships and the French Indoors was a tennis event held from 1895 through 1971 in Paris, France and Lyon, France.

== History ==
The French Covered Court Championships was played at the Tennis Club de Paris the original location was Rue de Civry in the 16th arrondissement of Paris shortly before the beginning of the 1st World War it changed location to Port de Saint Cloud until shortly after the 2nd World War when it moved again to its current location at 91 Boulevard Exelmans, Auteuil, Paris, France. The club still exists today, it originally had four very fast Indoor (Oak Parquet Wood) courts and five Outdoor Clay courts. The tournament was one of earliest events open to international players for the indoor event the staging of the tournament tended to fluctuate between February, April and November annually the men's competition ceased in 1969 but the women's continued until 1971, it ran for 69 editions and was an early predecessor of the current Paris Masters.

== Champions ==
Notes: Challenge round: The final round of a tournament, in which the winner of a single-elimination phase faces the previous year's champion, who plays only that one match. The challenge round was used in the early history of tennis (from 1877 through 1921) in some tournaments not all. (c) Indicates challenger

=== Men's singles ===
Year	Champions	Runners-up	Score
Championnats de France sur Court Couvert
1895	(France) André Vacherot	(France) Paul Aymé	6–3, 6–3, 6–3
1896	(Ireland) Manliffe Goodbody	(England) George Simond	7–5, 6–3, 6–4
1897	(Ireland) Manliffe Goodbody	(United Kingdom) Frank Riseley	6–3, 6–1, 6–0
1898	(England) George Simond	(France) Paul Aymé	9–7, 2–6, 7–5 retired.
1899	(United Kingdom) Major Ritchie	(France) Paul Aymé	4–6, 6–3, 6–3, 6–4
1900	(United Kingdom) George Caridia	(Ireland) Harold Mahony	3–6, 11–9, 6–3
1901	(England) George Simond	(France) Max Decugis	6–0, 7–5, 6–1
1902	(United Kingdom) Major Ritchie	(France) Max Decugis	5–7, 7–9, 6–3, 6–2, 6–3
1903	(France) Max Decugis	(United Kingdom) Major Ritchie	7–5, 6–1, 5–7, 8–6
1904	(France) Max Decugis	(England) Robert Baldwin Hough	5–7, 6–2, 6–2, 6–3
1905	(United Kingdom) Major Ritchie	(England) John Flavelle	6–4, 10–8, 6–4
1906	(New Zealand) Anthony Wilding	(United Kingdom) Major Ritchie	6–2, 6–1, 6–1
1907	(New Zealand) Anthony Wilding	(France) Max Decugis	4–6, 6–1, 1–6, 4-1 retired.
1908	(United Kingdom) Major Ritchie	(France) Max Decugis	8–6, 6–4, 1–6, 6–4
1909	(France) Max Decugis	(England) Arthur Lowe	6–0, 6–3, 3–6, 6–3
1910	(France) Max Decugis	(England) Arthur Lowe	0–6, 6–1, 6–2, 6–2
1911	(France) William Laurentz	(New Zealand) Anthony Wilding	4–6, 4–6, 6–1, 13-11, 8–6
1912	(France) André Gobert	(France) Maurice Germot	6–4, 6–4, 6–2
1913	(France) André Gobert	(France) William Laurentz	6–3, 4–6, 6–2, 6–4
1914	(France) Gordon Lowe	(France) Félix Poulin	6–3, 6–1, 6–2
1914/1919	Not held (due to World War I)		
1920	(France) André Gobert	(France) Jacques Brugnon	6–0, 6–2, 6–1
1921	(France) Jacques Brugnon	(France) Marcel Dupont	6–1, 6–3, 6–2
1922	(France) Jean Borotra	(France) Jacques Brugnon	6–1, 6–2, 2–6, 6–1
1923	(France) René Lacoste	(France) Max Hirsch	5–7, 11–9, 6–3, 6–0
1924	(France) Jean Borotra	(France) Henri Cochet	6–2, 9–7, 5–7, 6–4
1925	(France) René Lacoste	(France) André Gobert	3–6, 6–1, 6–1, 3–6, 6–4
1926	(France) Jean Couiteas de Faucamberge	(France) Jean Rebois	6-3, 6-0, 6-4
1927	(France) Jean Borotra	(France) Pierre Henri Landry	2–6, 6–1, 6–4, 6–1
1928	(France) René de Buzelet	(France) Pierre Henri Landry	6–4, 4–6, 3–6, 6–3, 7–5
1929	(France) Jean Borotra	(France) Roger George	6–2, 6–2, 6–4
1930	(France) Jean Borotra	(France) Christian Boussus	6–2, 6–4, 6–1
1931	(France) Jean Borotra	(France) Jean Lesueur	6–3, 11–9, 5–7, 6–4
1932	(France) Jean Borotra	(France) Marcel Bernard	1–6, 6–3, 4–6, 6–3, 6–4
1933	(France) Jean Borotra	(France) René de Buzelet	6–2, 4–6, 6–2, 6–1
1934	(France) André Merlin	(France) Paul Féret	6–2, 3–6, 5–7, 6–0, 6–2
1935	(France) Jean Borotra	(United Kingdom) Daniel Prenn	6–2, 6–2, 6–4
1936	(France) Jean Borotra	(France) Bernard Destremau	8–6, 8–6, 6–2
1937	(France) Marcel Bernard	(France) Bernard Destremau	6–4, 6–4, 1–6, 3–6, 9–7
1938	(France) Yvon Petra	(Sweden) Karl Schröder	9–7, 7–5, 3–6, 9–7
1939	(France) Pierre Pellizza	(Czechoslovakia) Roderich Menzel	4–6, 6–2, 6–2, 6–1
1940/1945	Not held (due to World War II)		
1946	(Sweden) Lennart Bergelin	(France) Yvon Petra	4–6, 5–7, 6–4, 6–4, 6–4
1947	(France) Jean Borotra	(Sweden) Torsten Johansson	6–4, 9–7, 5–7, 3–6, 6–4
1948	(Spain) Pedro Masip	(France) Henri Cochet	7–5, 6–4, 2–6, 2–6, 6-
1949	(United States) Frank Parker	(France) Marcel Bernard	6–1, 4–6, 6–3, 6–2
1950	(Sweden) Sven Davidson	(Sweden) Torsten Johansson	6–2, 7–5, 6–3
1951	(Egypt) Jaroslav Drobný	(France) Marcel Bernard	8–6, 6–3, 6–4
1952	(Denmark) Kurt Nielsen	(Egypt) Jaroslav Drobný	8–6, 6–4, 6–4
1953	(United States) Budge Patty	(United States) Art Larsen	6–3, 4–6, 7–5, 6–4
1954	(Denmark) Torben Ulrich	(Poland) Władysław Skonecki	6–2, 6–3, 6–3
1955	(United States) Budge Patty	(United States) Hugh Stewart	6–3 7–5 6–3
1956	(United States) Budge Patty	(Sweden) Sven Davidson	6–2 3–6 6–3 6–0
1957	(Sweden) Sven Davidson	(Denmark) Torben Ulrich	6–3, 4–6, 6–3, 6–4
1958	(Denmark) Kurt Nielsen	(Egypt) Jaroslav Drobný	7–5, 6–3, 6–2
1959	(Denmark) Kurt Nielsen	(France) Jean-Claude Molinari	10–8, 3–6, 6–3, 6–3
1960	(Denmark) Jørgen Ulrich	(United Kingdom) Billy Knight	2–6, 6–4, 6–4, 6–4
1961	(Denmark) Jørgen Ulrich	(United Kingdom) Billy Knight	7–5, 4–6, 8–10, 6–3, 6–4
1962	(Sweden) Jan-Erik Lundqvist	(France) Pierre Darmon	3–6, 8–10, 6–2, 6–3, 6–4
1963	(Sweden) Jan-Erik Lundqvist	(France) Jean-Claude Barclay	6–4, 8–6, 6–2
1964	(United Kingdom) Bobby Wilson	(Socialist Federal Republic of Yugoslavia) Nikola Pilić	10–8, 6–2, 6–4
1965	(United Kingdom) Bobby Wilson	(United Kingdom) Roger Taylor	6–4, 6–4, 6–3
1966	(Sweden) Jan-Erik Lundqvist	(United Kingdom) Bobby Wilson	6–4, 6–4, 6–4
1967	(Netherlands) Tom Okker	(Czechoslovakia) Jan Kodeš	6–2, 3–6, 6–3, 6–4
Open era
1968	(Czechoslovakia) Milan Holeček	(Australia) Bob Carmichael	6–4, 10–8, 3–6, 6–3
1969	(France) Jean-Pierre Courcol	(United Kingdom) Graham Stilwell	10–8, 6–8, 6–0, 10–8

=== Women's singles ===
- Notes: The women's tournament of 1968 were played twice in * Paris and ** Lyon.

(incomplete roll)

Year	Champions	Runners-up	Score
Championnats de France sur Court Couvert
1895	(France) Adine Masson	(United Kingdom) Mrs Underwoods	6–3, 6–2
1896	(France) Adine Masson	(United Kingdom) Phoebe Riseley Hausburg	7–5, 6–4
1897	(France) Adine Masson	(France) Suzanne Girod	
1902	(United Kingdom) Blanche Duddell	(France) Marie-Louise de Pfeffel	6–0, 6–2
1903	(France) Kate Gillou	(France) Marie-Louise de Pfeffel	4–6, 6–4, 6–2
1905	(United States) Vera Warden	?	?
1906	(United States) Vera Warden	(United Kingdom) Miss Andrews	6–3, 6–2
1907	(United Kingdom) Gladys Eastlake-Smith	(France) Marie-Louise de Pfeffel	7–5, 6–1
1908	(France) Adine Masson	(France) Abeille Villard Gallay	6–1, 6–2
1909	(France) Adine Masson	(France) Jeanne Matthey	6–3, 6–2
1910	(France) Marguerite Broquedis	(France) Daisy Speranza	11–9, 7–5
1911	(France) Germaine Régnier	(United Kingdom) Madeline Fisher O’Neill	6–8, 6–2, 6–4
1912	(France) Marie Conquet	(France) Jeanne Matthey	1–6, 6–4, 10–8
1913	(France) Marguerite Broquedis	(France) Marie Danet	6–2, 6–1
1914	(France) Marie Conquet	(France) Germaine Golding	6–3, 6–4
1914/1918	Not held (due to World War I)		
1919	(France) Mlle Amblard	(France) Jeanne Vaussard	6–0, 6–2
1920	(France) Germaine Golding	(France) Jeanne Vaussard	6–8, 6–3, 6–1
1921	(France) Germaine Golding	(France) Daisy Speranza	6–2, 6–2
1922	(France) Marguerite Broquedis	(France) Marie Conquet	7–9, 7–5, 6–1
1923	(France) Germaine Golding	(France) Jeanne Vaussard	6–2, 6–2
1924	(France) Germaine Golding	(France) Suzanne Devé	6–2, 6–4
1925	(France) Marguerite Broquedis Billout	(France) Marie Conquet	4–6, 6–3, 6–1
1926	(France) Germaine Golding	(France) Jeanne Vaussard	6–3, 2–6, 6–3
1927	(France) Marguerite Broquedis Bordes	(France) Germaine Golding	6–2, 6–3
1928	(France) Suzanne Devé	(France) Germaine Golding	1–6, 12–10, 8–6
1929	(France) Simone Kleinadel	(France) Germaine Golding	8–6, 6–4
1930	(Germany) Paula von Reznicek	(France) Marguerite Bordes	6–2, 6–2
1931	(France) Germaine Golding	(France) Arlette Neufeld	6–2, 2–6, 6–0
1932	(Switzerland) Lolette Payot	(France) Yvonne Kleinadel	6–4, 6–0
1933	(France) Jacqueline Goldschmidt	(France) Mme Michel Bernard	6–1, 6–3
1934	(France) Colette Rosambert	(France) Yvonne Kleinadel	6–2, 3–6, 6–3
1935	(Switzerland) Lolette Payot	(France) Ida Adamoff	1–6, 6–3, 6–4
1936	(Belgium) Nelly Adamson	(United Kingdom) Simone Lafargue	2–6, 7–5, 6–2
1937	(France) Suzanne Pannetier	(France) Yvonne Kleinadel	6–2, 6–0
1938	(France) Suzanne Pannetier	(France) Arlette Neufeld Halff	7–5, 6–4
1939	(France) Suzanne Pannetier	(United States) Gracyn Wheeler	4–6, 6–2, 6–2
1940/1945	Not held (due to World War II)		
1946	(France) Nelly Adamson Landry	(France) Micheline Inglebert	6–3, 6–3
1947	(France) Nelly Adamson Landry	(France) Colette Rosambert-Boegner	6–0, 6–2
1948	(France) Nelly Adamson Landry	(France) Colette Rosambert-Boegner	3–6, 6–3, 6–3
1949	(France) Maud Galtier	(France) Jacqueline Saladin Boutin	0–6, 6–1, 6–3
1950	(France) Anne-Marie Seghers	(France) Arlette Neufeld Halff	6–1, 6–2
1951	(United Kingdom) Jean Quertier	(United Kingdom) Joan Curry	6–3, 1–6, 8–6
1952	(United Kingdom) Jean Quertier	(France) Nelly Adamson Landry	9–7, 7–5
1953	(United Kingdom) Susan Partridge	(France) Suzanne Schmitt	8–6, 7–5
1954	(France) Maud Galtier	(France) Jacqueline Kermina	6–3, 6–4
1955	(United Kingdom) Patricia Ward	(France) Susan Chatrier	7–5, 6–4
1956	(United States) Althea Gibson	(United Kingdom) Angela Buxton	6–2, 8–6
1957	(Australia) Thelma Coyne Long	(United Kingdom) Angela Buxton	6–1, 1–6, 6–2
1958	(Belgium) Christiane Mercelis	(United Kingdom) Patricia Ward	6–3, 7–9, 8–6
1959	(United Kingdom) Angela Mortimer	(France) Flo de la Courtie	6–2, 6–1
1960	(United Kingdom) Angela Mortimer	(United Kingdom) Marian Craig-Smith	7–5, 7–5
1961	(United Kingdom) Angela Mortimer	(United Kingdom) Shirley Bloomer	2–6, 6–3, 6–0
1962	(United Kingdom) Ann Haydon	(Mexico) Rosie Reyes Darmon	6–3, 6–1
1963	(United Kingdom) Ann Haydon Jones	(France) Janine Lieffrig	8–6, 6–1
1964	(France) Janine Lieffrig	(Australia) Christine Truman	6–4, 8–6
1965	(United Kingdom) Ann Haydon Jones	(United Kingdom) Elizabeth Starkie	6–3, 6-8, 6–2
1966	(United Kingdom) Ann Haydon Jones	(United Kingdom) Frances MacLennan	6–2, 6–2
1967	(France) Monique Salfati	(United Kingdom) Winnie Shaw	6–2, 10–8
Open era
1968	(United Kingdom) Nell Truman	(France) Évelyne Terras	7–5, 7–5 *
1968	(Mexico) Rosie Reyes Darmon	(France) Danièle Wild-Bouteleux	6–1, 1–6, 9–7 **
1969	(Netherlands) Betty Stöve	(France) Janine Lieffrig	6–3, 6–2
1970	(France) Odile de Roubin	(France) Gail Sherriff Chanfreau	6–2, 6–2
1971	(United Kingdom) Marilyn Greenwood	(France) Odile de Roubin	6–2, 6–4

== See also ==
- Fédération Française de Tennis
- Paris Masters – successor to the French Covered Court Championships
- Category:National and multi-national tennis tournaments

== Sources ==
- Ayre's Lawn Tennis Almanack And Tournament Guide, A. Wallis Myers. UK.
- Dunlop Lawn Tennis Almanack and Tournament Guide, G.P. Hughes, 1939 to 1958, Published by Dunlop Sports Co. Ltd., UK.
- Lawn Tennis and Badminton Magazines, 1896–1901, Amateur Sports Publishing Co. Ltd., London, UK.
- Lawn Tennis and Croquet Magazines, 1901–1920, Amateur Sports Publishing Co. Ltd., London, UK.
- Lowe's Lawn Tennis Annuals and Compendia, Lowe, Sir F. Gordon, Eyre & Spottiswoode, London, UK.
