= City of Paris Open Championships =

Defunct tennis tournament
- Tour: ILTF World Circuit (1913-70) combined ILTF Grand Prix Circuit (1971) men ILTF World Circuit (1971,73) women
- Founded: 1901
- Abolished: 1973
- Location: Paris; France
- Venue: Ile de Puteaux Tennis-Club de Paris (1901-10); Tennis Club de Paris (1911-20); Racing Club de France (1921-44, 1947-51, 1953-64); Stade Jean-Bouin (1965-66); Roland Garros (1945-46,52, 1967-71)
- Surface: Clay

City of Paris Open Championships, was a combined FFT/ILTF affiliated clay court tennis tournament founded in 1901 as men's event called the City of Paris Championships the tournament was first played at the Puteaux, Le club, de l'Île de Puteaux, Paris, France. In 1921 its name was changed to the Poree Cup, and it was moved to the autumn in the tennis calendar schedule. In 1931 it was rebranded as the Paris International Championships, and became a combined event. In 1947 the French Tennis Federation re-established the Coupe Marcel Porée as separate tournament, moving it to early Autumn in the tennis calendar. This event was moved to Easter before the French Championships, and continued under its title name the Paris international Championships till at least the late 1960s. The event ran annually until 1971 it became known as the City of Paris Open, when the tournament ended that year. It was then revived as a women's event in 1973 when it too was abolished.

== History ==
Founded in 1901 as the City of Paris Championships, it was first played at Ile de Puteaux Tennis-Club. In 1911 the tournament was moved to the Tennis Club de Paris.

In 1921 the tournament was moved to the Racing Club de France and its scheduling changed to autumn, late September or early October, with the move its name was changed to the Marcel Poree Cup or (Coupe Marcel Porée) in honor of Marcel Porée, a member of the Racing Club de France committee, who died in a car accident just a few months earlier.

In 1931 its name was changed again to the Paris International Championships from that date the Coupe Marcel Porée then denoted the winner of men's singles championship. The winner's of women's singles championship were awarded the Coupe Jean Gouttenoire, and the men's doubles the Coupe Cyril, and the mixed doubles the Coupe Jacques Lefébure.

In 1947 the French Tennis Federation re-established the Coupe Marcel Porée as a separate distinct tournament in its own right. It then was played in the autumn between September and October, and then became the last event played on clay of the season at the Racing Club de France before the start of competitions on indoor courts.

The same year in 1947 the Paris International Championships were moved to the Tennis-Club de Paris, and from then it was played around Easter before the French Championships. It remained a joint men's and women's event until 1970 when the ladies championship ended.

In 1971 the men's event ended, and in 1973 the women's event was revived for one last edition. The tournament was part of ILTF European Circuit from 1914 to 1968. During its final few seasons the men's events was part of the ILTF Grand Prix Circuit.

The tournament was also at times played at Roland Garros, and Stade Jean-Bouin.

== Finals ==
=== Men's singles ===
(incomplete roll) included:

Year	Champion	Runner-up	Score
City of Paris Championships
1901	(France) Max Decugis	(France) Paul Lebreton	8–6, 2–6, 6–2, 7–5
1902	(United Kingdom) Reginald Doherty	(France) Paul Lebreton	w.o.
1903	(United Kingdom) Reginald Doherty	(France) Max Decugis	6–4, 6–3, 8–6
1904	(United Kingdom) Arthur Gore	(France) Max Decugis	3–6, 5–7, 6–3, 6–2
1907	(France) Max Decugis	(France) Pierre Gautier	6–0, 6–0, 6–0
1908	(France) Max Decugis	(France) Maurice Germot	1–6, 6–2, 6–3, retd.
1909	(France) Max Decugis	(France) Maurice Germot	7–5, 7–5, 7–5
1910	(France) Robert Wallet	(United Kingdom) Réginald Forbes	6–1, 6–4
1911	(France) André Gobert	(France) William Laurentz	6–4, 6–4, 6–3
1912	(France) Max Decugis	(France) Maurice Germot	8–6, 6–2, 6–4
1913	(France) William Laurentz	(France) André Gobert	6–1, 9–7, 3–6, 6–2, 2–3, retd.
1914/1920	Not held (due to World War I)		
Coupe Marcel Poree
1921	(France) Marcel Dupont	(France) Pierre Canivet	6–0, 6–0, 6–2
1922	(France) Pierre Hirsch	(Armenia) Léonce Aslangul	6–4, 6–1, 6–4
1923	(France) Jean Borotra	(France) Antoine Gentien	6–2, 6–3, 8–6
1924	(France) Paul Féret	(Denmark) Erik Tegner	6–2, 6–1, 6–4
1925	(France) Paul Féret	(Armenia) Léonce Aslangul	6–2, 6–3, 4–6, 6–1
1926	(France) Roger George	(France) Antoine Gentien	5–7, 6–0, 6–3
1927	(France) Henri Cochet	(France) Christian Boussus	4–6, 6–4, 3–6, 6–3, 6–3
1928	(France) André Aron	(France) Louis Geraud	7–5, 6–3, 6–2
1929	(France) Jean Borotra	(France) Christian Boussus	7–5, 6–3, 9–7
1930	(France) Jean Borotra	(France) Christian Boussus	6–1, 6–3, 1–6, 5–7, 6–4
Paris International Championships
1931	(France) Paul Féret	(France) André Merlin	6–3, 6–1, 2–6, 4–6, 6–4
1932	(France) Christian Boussus	(France) Paul Féret	2–6, 6–3, 6–1, 6–2
1933	(Germany) Daniel Prenn	(France) Christian Boussus	2–6, 3–6, 6–2, 6–3, 6–4
1934	(France) Christian Boussus	(France) André Martin-Legeay	6–4, 6–3, 6–0
1935	(France) Marcel Bernard	(Italy) Giovanni Palmieri	6–4, 6–1, 6–0
1936	(France) André Merlin	(France) André Martin-Legeay	6–4, 2–6, 7–5, 6–3
1937	(Kingdom of Yugoslavia) Franjo Punčec	(Republic of China (1912–1949)) Kho Sin-Kie	6–2, 6–2, 2–6, 6–4
1939/1942	Not held (due to World War II)		
1943	(France) Henri Cochet	(France) Yvon Petra	10–8, 11–9, 9–7
1945	(France) Yvon Petra	(France) Marcel Bernard	6–3, 6–0, 6–4
1946	(France) Yvon Petra	(France) Pierre Pellizza	6–8, 5–7, 6–2, 6–3, 7–5
1947	(United States) Budge Patty	(France) Bernard Destremau	4–6, 6–3, 7–5, 4–6, 6–4
1948	(France) Marcel Bernard	(France) Henri Cochet	6–4, 6–3, 6–2
1949	(United States) Frank Parker	(France) Marcel Bernard	6–0, 7–5, 8–6
1950	(United States) Bill Talbert	(United States) Budge Patty	6–3, 9–7, 6–1
1951	(Egypt) Jaroslav Drobný	(United States) Dick Savitt	6–1, 6–3, 7–5
1952	(United States) Budge Patty	(Argentina) Enrique Morea	6–2, 6–4, 6–1
1953	(United States) Budge Patty	(United States) Bernard Bartzen	4–6, 6–4, 6–3, 6–4
1954	(United States) Hal Burrows	(France) Paul Rémy	7–5, 2–6, 6–3, 8–6
1955	(United States) Budge Patty	(Australia) Mervyn Rose	6–2, 6–2, 6–1
1956	(United States) Budge Patty	(United States) Art Larsen	6–2, 10–12, 6–2, 6–1
1957	(Australia) Mervyn Rose	(United States) Budge Patty	7–5, 6–3, 7–5
1958	(United States) Budge Patty	(Egypt) Jaroslav Drobný	10–8, 6–0, 6–3
1959	(France) Pierre Darmon	(France) Gérard Pilet	6–2, 1–6, 3–6, 6–3, 6–1
1960	(France) Jean-Noël Grinda	(France) Robert Haillet	6–2, 6–4, 6–1
1961	(France) Pierre Darmon	(France) Gérard Pilet	4–6, 6–3, 6–3, 6–1
1962	(France) Gérard Pilet	(France) Pierre Darmon	6–0, 6–3, 5–7, 1–6, 6–3
1963	(France) Pierre Darmon	(Australia) Alan Lane	5–7, 6–4, 6–1, 6–3
1964	(Brazil) Thomaz Koch	(Brazil) Ronald Barnes	6–0, 6–1, 1–6, 9–7
1965	(South Africa) Bob Hewitt	(France) Pierre Barthes	6–2, 6–3, 6–3
1966	(Chile) Jaime Pinto Bravo	(France) François Jauffret	7–5, 6–1, 8–10, 6–2
1967	(France) Pierre Darmon	(France) François Jauffret	6–3, 6–2, 6–2
1968	(Australia) Bob Carmichael	(France) Pierre Darmon	6–3, 8–6, 12–10
↓ Open Era ↓
City of Paris Open Championships
1971	(United States) Stan Smith	(France) François Jauffret	6–2, 6–4, 7–5,

=== Women's Singles ===
Year	Winner	Runner-up	Score
Coupe Marcel Poree
1922	(France) Yvonne Bourgeois	(France) Germaine Bourgeois Pigueron	??
1923	(France) Mme Danet	(France) Daisy Speranza	6-4, 1-6, 6-2
1924	(Greece) Hélène Contostavlos	(France) Simone Passemard	6-2, 6-4
1925	(Greece) Hélène Contostavlos	(France) Simone Passemard	6-1, 4-6, 7-5
1926	(Greece) Hélène Contostavlos	(France) Yvonne Bourgeois	6-3, 6-2
1927	(France) Simonne Mathieu	(France) Marguerite Broquedis	6-1, 6-4
1928	(France) Simonne Mathieu	(Greece) Hélène Contostavlos	3-6, 6-1, 7-5
1929	(France) Simonne Mathieu	(Germany) Ilse Friedleben	7-5, 6-3
1930	(France) Simonne Mathieu	(France) Leila Schopfer	6-0, 6-2
Paris International Championships
1950	(United States) Dottie Head	(France) Jacqueline Saladin Boutin	6-3, 6-3
1951	(France) Nelly Adamson Landry	(Hungary) Zsuzsa Körmöczy	8-10, 6-4, 7-5
1952	(United States) Dottie Head	(France) Jacqueline Saladin Boutin	6-0, 6-3
1953	(France) Nelly Adamson Landry	(France) Jacqueline Kermina	7-5, 6-2
1954	(France) Jacqueline Kermina	(France) Josette Billaz	8-6, 6-3
1955	(France) Jacqueline Kermina	(France) Maud Mottez Galtier	6-1, 4-6, 7-5
1956	(Australia) Thelma Coyne Long	(France) Ginette Jucker Bucaille	6-2, 6-1
1957	(Germany) Edda Buding	(Germany) Ilse Buding	3-6, 6-3, 6-1
1958	(France) Aline Nenot	(Australia) Marie Martin	6-4, 5-7, 6-0
1959	(France) Monique Hamelin Coste	(France) Jacqueline Rees-Lewis	6-2, 6-4
1960	(Chile) Maria Tort Ayala	(France) N. Huve	6-2, 6-3
1961	(France) Jacqueline Kermina	(France) Claudine Pierval	9-7, 4-6, 6-3
1962	(France) Françoise Dürr	(United States) Dottie Head Knode	6-4, 0-6, 6-0
1963	(France) Françoise Dürr	(France) Jacqueline Kermina	8-6, 6-1
1964	(France) Françoise Dürr	(France) Michelle Boulle	6-2, 6-0
1965	(Australia) Faye Toyne	(United States) Dottie Head Knode	6-3, 6-2
1966	(France) Françoise Dürr	(Australia) Faye Toyne	6-3, 6-2
1967	(Australia) Gail Sherriff	(Australia) Faye Toyne	0-6, 6-1, 6-3
1968	(Australia) Gail Sherriff	(France) Odile de Roubin	6-0, 6-1
1969	(France) Odile de Roubin	(France) Claudine Pierval Rouire	7-5, 6-3
City of Paris Open Championships
1970	(France) Odile de Roubin	(France) Danielle Wild Bouteleux	3-6, 6-2, 6-3
