= 1920 World Hard Court Championships – Men's singles =

Men's singles
- 1920 World Hard Court Championships

Final
- Champion: (France) William Laurentz
- Runner-up: (France) André Gobert
- Score: 9–7, 6–2, 3–6, 6–2

Details
- Draw: 30

Events
Singles	men	women
Doubles	men	women	mixed
- World Hard Court Championships

The men's singles was one of five events of the 1920 World Hard Court Championships tennis tournament held in Paris, France from 22 until 30 May 1920. The draw consisted of 30 players. Anthony Wilding was the defending champion, but did not participate. William Laurentz defeated compatriot André Gobert in the final to win the Championship.

== Draw ==
Key

- Q = Qualifier
- WC = Wild card
- LL = Lucky loser
- Alt = Alternate
- ITF = ITF entry
- PR = Protected ranking
- SR = Special ranking
- SE = Special exempt
- JE = Junior exempt
- JR = Junior Accelerator Programme entrant
- CO = College Accelerator Programme entrant
- NG = Next Gen Accelerator Program entrant
- w/o = Walkover
- r = Retired
- d = Defaulted

=== Finals ===
Semifinals
(France) William Laurentz	6	8	8
(Spain) Manuel Alonso	2	6	6
(Denmark) Erik Tegner
(France) André Gobert	w/o

Final
(France) William Laurentz	9	6	3	6
(France) André Gobert	7	2	6	2

=== Top half ===
First round
(France) William Laurentz	6	6	6
(Spain) Luis de Olivares	1	0	1
(South Africa) George Dodd	6	7	6
(France) Roger Danet	4	5	4
(France) Pierre Hirsch	7	7	6
(France) Max Decugis	5	5	4
(Japan) Zenzo Shimidzu	6	6	6	6
(France) Jacques Brugnon	3	3	7	1
(Romania) Nicolae Mişu	7	6	3	6
(United Kingdom) Percival Davson	5	1	6	1
(Spain) Manuel Alonso	6	6	6
(France) Alain Gerbault	2	1	3
(South Africa) Brian Norton	6	5	6	6
(Switzerland) René de Grenus	1	7	2	4

Second round
(France) William Laurentz	6	9	6
(South Africa) George Dodd	0	7	0
(France) Pierre Hirsch	6	6	6
(United Kingdom) Arthur Wallis Myers	2	2	1
(Japan) Zenzo Shimidzu	7	3	6	5
(Romania) Nicolae Mişu	5	6	1	3^{r}
(Spain) Manuel Alonso	6	6	6	6
(South Africa) Brian Norton	2	8	2	1

Quarterfinals
(France) William Laurentz	6	6	6
(France) Pierre Hirsch	1	0	3
(Japan) Zenzo Shimidzu	4	5	6	5
(Spain) Manuel Alonso	6	7	3	7

Semifinals
(France) William Laurentz	6	8	8
(Spain) Manuel Alonso	2	6	6

=== Bottom half ===
First round
(Denmark) Erik Tegner	6	6	6
(France) Jean le Besnerais	0	3	4
(South Africa) Cecil Blackbeard	w/o
(Spain) Eduardo Flaquer
(South Africa) Louis Raymond	4	6	7	6
G. Cousin	6	2	5	3
(United Kingdom) Oswald Turnbull	6	6	6
(France) S. Martin	2	0	0
(United Kingdom) Arthur Lovibond	3	6	6	6
G. Sabragh	6	0	0	1
(France) André Gobert	3	1	1
(Spain) Jose Maria Alonso	6	6	6
(United Kingdom) Charles Winslow
(United States) Nathaniel Niles	6	6	6
Gerald	1	3	1

Second round
(Denmark) Erik Tegner	9	7	6
(South Africa) Cecil Blackbeard	7	5	3
(South Africa) Louis Raymond	4	6	6	7
(United Kingdom) Oswald Turnbull	6	4	1	5
(United Kingdom) Arthur Lovibond	4	2	3
(France) André Gobert	6	6	6
(United Kingdom) Charles Winslow	0	12	6	6	6
(United States) Nathaniel Niles	6	14	1	0	4

Quarterfinals
(Denmark) Erik Tegner	w/o
(South Africa) Louis Raymond
(France) André Gobert	7	7	7
(United Kingdom) Charles Winslow	5	5	5

Semifinals
(Denmark) Erik Tegner
(France) André Gobert	w/o
