= 1920 World Hard Court Championships – Women's singles =

Women's singles
- 1920 World Hard Court Championships

Final
- Champion: (United Kingdom) Dorothy Holman
- Runner-up: (Spain) Francisca Subirana
- Score: 6–0, 7–5

Details
- Draw: 15

Events
Singles	men	women
Doubles	men	women	mixed
- World Hard Court Championships

The women's singles was one of five events of the 1920 World Hard Court Championships tennis tournament held in Paris, France from 23 until 30 May 1920. The draw consisted of 15 players. Suzanne Lenglen was the defending champion, but did not participate. Dorothy Holman won the title, defeating Francisca Subirana in the final.

== Draw ==
Key

- Q = Qualifier
- WC = Wild card
- LL = Lucky loser
- Alt = Alternate
- ITF = ITF entry
- PR = Protected ranking
- SR = Special ranking
- SE = Special exempt
- JE = Junior exempt
- JR = Junior Accelerator Programme entrant
- CO = College Accelerator Programme entrant
- NG = Next Gen Accelerator Program entrant
- w/o = Walkover
- r = Retired
- d = Defaulted

=== Draw ===
First round
(United Kingdom) Dorothy Holman	6	6
(South Africa) Olive Winslow	2	4
(France) Jeanne Vaussard	6	6
(Spain) Isabel Fonrodona	4	0
(France) Suzanne Amblard	w/o
(France) Suzanne Lenglen
(United Kingdom) Phyllis Satterthwaite	6	6
(France) Germaine Golding	2	4
(France) Elisabeth d'Ayen	6	4	6
(France) Genevieve Cousin	2	6	1
(France) Marguerite Billout	6	6
(United Kingdom) Miss Lammin	3	3
(Spain) Panchita Subirana	6	6
(France) Suzanne Deve	2	2

Quarterfinals
(United Kingdom) Dorothy Holman	6	6
(France) Marie Danet	2	4
(France) Jeanne Vaussard	4	3
(France) Suzanne Amblard	6	6
(United Kingdom) Phyllis Satterthwaite	6	6
(France) Elisabeth d'Ayen	3	2
(France) Marguerite Billout	8	4
(Spain) Panchita Subirana	10	6

Semifinals
(United Kingdom) Dorothy Holman	6	4	6
(France) Suzanne Amblard	2	6	0
(United Kingdom) Phyllis Satterthwaite
(Spain) Panchita Subirana	w/o

Final
(United Kingdom) Dorothy Holman	6	7
(Spain) Panchita Subirana	0	5
