= 1920 World Hard Court Championships – Women's doubles =

Women's doubles
- 1920 World Hard Court Championships

Final
- Champions: (United Kingdom) Dorothy Holman (United Kingdom) Phyllis Satterthwaite
- Runners-up: (France) Germaine Golding (France) Jeanne Vaussard
- Score: 6–3, 6–1

Details
- Draw: 7

Events
Singles	men	women
Doubles	men	women	mixed
- World Hard Court Championships

The women's doubles was one of five events at the 1920 World Hard Court Championships. Suzanne Lenglen and Elizabeth Ryan were the title holders, but did not participate. Dorothy Holman and Phyllis Satterthwaite won the Championship, defeating Germaine Golding and Jeanne Vaussard 6–3, 6–1 in the final.

== Draw ==
Key

- Q = Qualifier
- WC = Wild card
- LL = Lucky loser
- Alt = Alternate
- ITF = ITF entry
- PR = Protected ranking
- SR = Special ranking
- SE = Special exempt
- JE = Junior exempt
- JR = Junior Accelerator Programme entrant
- CO = College Accelerator Programme entrant
- NG = Next Gen Accelerator Program entrant
- w/o = Walkover
- r = Retired
- d = Defaulted

=== Draw ===
Quarterfinals
(United Kingdom) Dorothy Holman (United Kingdom) Phyllis Satterthwaite	6	6
(France) Suzanne Amblard (France) Marguerite Billout	4	4
(Spain) Isabel Fonrodona (Spain) Panchite Subirana	8	6	7
(France) Marie Conquet (France) Marie Danet	6	8	5
(France) Germaine Golding (France) Jeanne Vaussard	6	6
(United Kingdom) Gertrude Denman; Mrs. Sanderson	1	1

Semifinals
(United Kingdom) Dorothy Holman (United Kingdom) Phyllis Satterthwaite	6	6
(Spain) Isabel Fonrodona (Spain) Panchite Subirana	3	2
(France) Germaine Golding (France) Jeanne Vaussard	6	7
(France) Elisabeth d'Ayen (France) Suzanne Devé	3	5

Finals
(United Kingdom) Dorothy Holman (United Kingdom) Phyllis Satterthwaite	6	6
(France) Germaine Golding (France) Jeanne Vaussard	3	1
