= Drive Club Open Tournament =

Defunct tennis tournament
- Founded: 1908
- Abolished: 1928
- Editions: 20
- Location: Fulham, London, England.
- Venue: The Drive Club
- Surface: Hard (cement), Clay (en tout cas)

The Drive Club Open Tournament and informally known as the Fulham Hard Courts was a combined men's and women's tennis tournament played at the Drive Club, Fulham, London, originally on hard cement courts, or sometimes clay courts and ran until 1928. In 1931 the Drive Club was closed.

== History ==
The Drive Club Tournament was founded in 1908 and were played on the Drive Mansions tennis courts at Fulham, London, England. They consisted of cement (concrete) courts, the first hard courts in London. The drive club also had clay courts constructed that had to be resurfaced in 1926 with en tout cas red clay.

In 1931 the drive club closed over the years the courts and grounds were not maintained, and eventually became abandoned. The land was sold to developers in the 1970s.

Notable winners of the men's singles championship title included Charles Percy Dixon (1908–1910) and Gordon Lowe (1920–1922). Former women's singles winners included Dorothy Holman, (1912, 1920, 1922–1923), Geraldine Ramsey Beamish (1924–1925), Kitty McKane (1924), Phyllis Howkins Covell (1925) and Phyllis Mudford (1928). Additionally Molla Bjurstedt was a losing finalist in 1909.

== Sources ==
- Fry, Charles Burgess (1910). "Lawn Tennis on Hard Courts". Fry's Magazine: The Illustrated Monthly of Sport, Travel and Outdoor Life. London: G. Newnes, Limited.
- "History: The early days". drivemansions.co.uk. London, England. The Drive Mansions Ltd.
- The Municipal Journal and Public Works Engineer (1926), En Tout Cas: Hard Lawn Tennis Court. London. Volume 35, Issue 1749. p. 1282
- The Sportsman (25 September 1912). The Drive Club Open Tournament at Fulham. London, England.
