= Leif Rovsing =

Danish tennis player

- Full name: Ludvig Leif Sadi Rovsing
- Born: 27 July 1887 Copenhagen, Denmark
- Died: 17 June 1977 (aged 89) Ordrup, Denmark

Ludvig Leif Sadi Rovsing, née Qvist (27 July 1887 – 17 June 1977) was a Danish tennis player. He competed in two events at the 1912 Summer Olympics.

As an openly gay man, he was excluded by Danish sports authorities, who banned his participation in several sports tournaments.

== World Championships finals ==
=== Doubles: 1 runner-up ===
| Result | Year | Championship | Surface | Partner | Opponents | Score |
|---|---|---|---|---|---|---|
| Loss | 1923 | World Covered Court Championships | Wood | (Denmark) Erik Tegner | (France) Henri Cochet (France) Jean Couiteas | 1–6, 1–6, 5–7 |
