= Nicolae Mișu (tennis) =

Romanian tennis player (1893–1973)

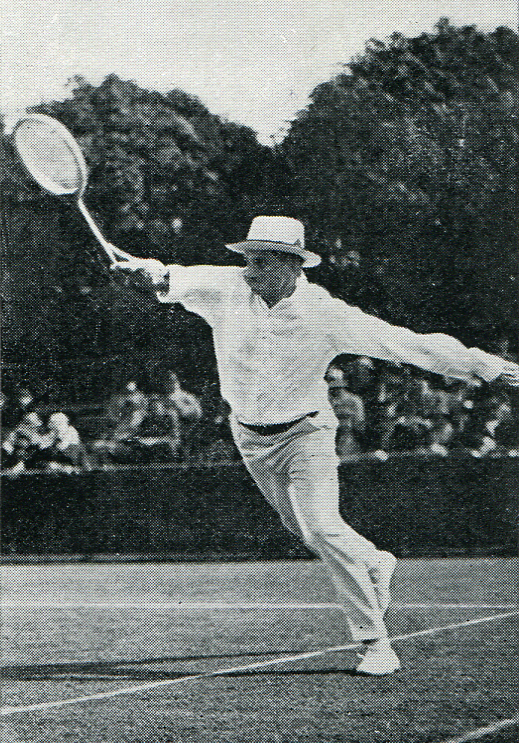
- Country (sports): Romania
- Born: 18 January 1893; Vienna, Austria-Hungary
- Died: 1 January 1973 (aged 79); Bucharest, Romania
- Turned pro: 1919
- Retired: 1933

Singles
- Career titles: 8

Grand Slam singles results
- French Open: QF (1926)
- Wimbledon: 3R (1922), (1924)

Other tournaments
- WHCC: SF (1919, 1923)
- Olympic Games: 1R (1924)

Doubles

Other doubles tournaments
- WHCC: F (1920, 1922)
- WCCC: F (1919)

Nicolae Mișu (also Nicholas Mishu; 18 January 1893 – 1 January 1973) was a Romanian tennis player and diplomat. He competed at the 1924 Summer Olympics and was also a member of Romanian Davis Cup team. His father, Nicolae Mișu, served as the Minister of Foreign Affairs of Romania.

== World Championships finals ==
=== Doubles: (3 runner-ups) ===
Result	Year	Championship	Surface	Partner	Opponents	Score
Loss	1919	World Covered Court Championships	Wood	(United Kingdom) H. Portlock	(France) André Gobert (France) William Laurentz	1–6, 0–6, 2–6
Loss	1920	World Hard Court Championships	Clay	(South Africa) Cecil Blackbeard	(France) André Gobert (France) William Laurentz	4–6, 2–6, 1–6
Loss	1922	World Hard Court Championships	Clay	(France) Marcel Dupont	(France) Jean Borotra (France) Henri Cochet	8–6, 1–6, 2–6, 3–6

== Career titles ==
No.	Date	Tournament	Opponent	Score
1.	1919	Monte-Carlo Championships, Roquebrune-Cap-Martin, France	(France) Max Decugis	6–2, 6–0
2.	1919	Riviera Championships, Menton, France	(France) Max Decugis	6–3, 6–2, 10–12, 2–6, 7–5
3	1919	London Hard Court Championships, London, England	(Australia) Stanley Doust	6–1, 6–3
4	1919	Cannes Championships, Cannes, France	(France) Max Decugis	6–8, 6–4, 4–6, 6–3, 6–0
5	1920	Riviera Championships, Menton, France	(United Kingdom) Gordon Lowe	4–3 r.
6	1919	Hendon Hard Courts (Autumn), Hendon, England	(New Zealand) Frank Fisher	4–6, 6–1, 6–4, 6–3
7	1922	North London Hard Court Championships, Highbury, England	(India) Athar-Ali Fyzee	6–3, 6–4, 0–6, 6–2
8	1924	Surrey Covered Court Championships, Dulwich, England	(South Africa) Patrick Spence	6–0, 5–7, 6–0, 6–4
