= Elsebeth Brehm =

Danish tennis player

- Country (sports): Denmark
- Born: 30 July 1901 Frederiksberg, Hovedstaden, Denmark
- Died: 14 July 1995 (aged 93) Gentofte, Hovedstaden, Denmark

Elsebeth Brehm, married name Jørgensen (30 July 1901 – 14 July 1995) was a Danish tennis player. She represented Denmark at the 1920 Summer Olympics and at the 1924 Summer Olympics.

Brehm won many Danish Championships, and in 1921, this athletic and aggressive player emerged as triple champion in the World Covered Court Championships, winning both the singles, the women's doubles along with Ebba Meyer, and the mixed doubles with Erik Tegner. This tournament was held at Brehm's home club in Copenhagen, Frederiksberg.
