= World Covered Court Championships =

Defunct tennis tournament
- Founded: 1913
- Abolished: 1923
- Editions: 6
- Location: Various
- Surface: Wood (indoor)

The World Covered Court Championships were part of a series of three major world championships sanctioned from 1913 to 1923 by the International Lawn Tennis Federation (ILTF). The tournament was played indoors on wood floors, and its venue changed from year to year among several countries. While the World Grass Court Championships (Wimbledon) and World Hard Court Championships (WHCC) could justify their "world championship" titles, the WCCC had trouble attracting top players from outside Europe. At an Annual General Meeting (AGM) held on 16 March 1923 in Paris, France the ILTF issued the ‘Rules of Tennis’ that were adopted with public effect on 1 January 1924. The United States became an affiliated member of the ILTF. The World Championship title was also dropped at this meeting and a new category of Official Championship was created for events in Great Britain, France, USA and Australia – today’s Grand Slam events. The WCCC tournament was then disbanded by the ILTF.

== Locations and dates ==
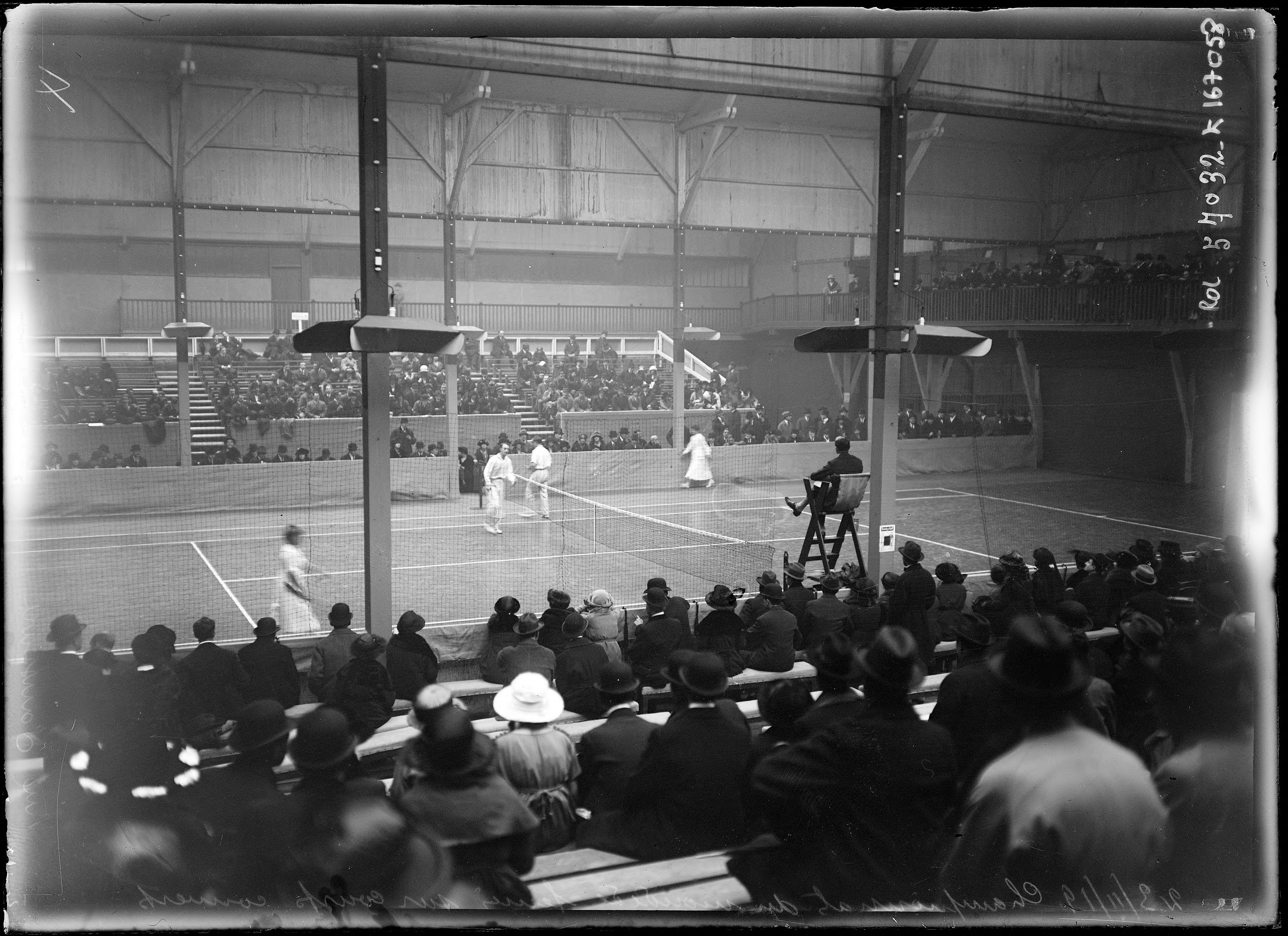
1919 World Covered Court Championships at 154. Rue Saussure

.

Year	Venue	Date
1913	Royal Lawn Tennis Club, Stockholm	2–8 November
1914-18	No competition (due to World War I)	
1919	Sporting Club de Paris, Paris	15–23 November
1920	Queen's Club, London	11–20 October
1921	Kjøbenhavns Boldklub, Copenhagen	2–10 April
1922	Palace Lawn Tennis Club, St. Moritz	16–25 February
1923	Palacio de la Industria, Barcelona	1–11 February

== Finals ==
=== Men's singles ===
Year	Champions	Runners-up	Score
1913	(New Zealand) Anthony Wilding	(France) Maurice Germot	5–7, 6–2, 6–3, 6–1
1914	No competition (due to World War I)		
1915	No competition (due to World War I)		
1916	No competition (due to World War I)		
1917	No competition (due to World War I)		
1918	No competition (due to World War I)		
1919	(France) Andre Gobert	(France) Max Decugis	6–3, 6–2, 6–2
1920	(United Kingdom) Gordon Lowe	(United Kingdom) Walter Crawley	6–2, 6–3, 6–1
1921	(France) William Laurentz	(United Kingdom) Alfred Beamish	6–2, 6–4, 6–2
1922	(France) Henri Cochet	(France) Jean Borotra	4–6, 2–6, 6–3, 6–2, 6–0
1923	(France) Henri Cochet	(United Kingdom) Brian Gilbert	6–4, 7–5, 6–4

=== Women's singles ===
Year	Champions	Runners-up	Score
1913	(United Kingdom) Helen Aitchison	(France) Kate Fenwick	6–4, 6–2
1914	No competition (due to World War I)		
1915	No competition (due to World War I)		
1916	No competition (due to World War I)		
1917	No competition (due to World War I)		
1918	No competition (due to World War I)		
1919	(United Kingdom) Dorothy Holman	(France) Germaine Golding	6–3, 6–4
1920	(United Kingdom) Winifred Beamish	(United Kingdom) Kitty McKane	6–2, 5–7, 9–7
1921	(Denmark) Elsebeth Brehm Jørgensen	(Denmark) Ebba Meyer	6–2, 6–4
1922	(France) Germaine Golding	(France) Jeanne Vaussard	6–2, 7–5
1923	(United Kingdom) Kitty McKane	(United Kingdom) Winifred Beamish	6–3, 4–6, 6–2

=== Men's doubles ===
Year	Champions	Runners-up	Score
1913	(France) Max Decugis (France) Maurice Germot	(Germany) Curt Bergmann (Germany) Heinrich Kleinschroth	7–5, 2–6, 7–9, 6–3, 6–1
1914	No competition (due to World War I)		
1915	No competition (due to World War I)		
1916	No competition (due to World War I)		
1917	No competition (due to World War I)		
1918	No competition (due to World War I)		
1919	(France) André Gobert (France) William Laurentz	(Romania) Nicolae Mișu (United Kingdom) H. Portlock	6–1, 6–0, 6–2
1920	(United Kingdom) Percival Davson (United Kingdom) Theodore Mavrogordato	(United Kingdom) Alfred Beamish (New Zealand) Frank Fisher	4–6, 10–8, 13–11, 3–6, 6–3
1921	(France) Maurice Germot (France) William Laurentz	(Denmark) Paul Henriksen (Denmark) Erik Tegner	6–3, 6–2, 3–6, 6–3
1922	(France) Henri Cochet (France) Jean Borotra	(Switzerland) Charles Martin (Switzerland) Armand Simon	2–6, 6–2, 6–1, 6–4
1923	(France) Henri Cochet (France) Jean Couiteas	(Denmark) Leif Rovsing (Denmark) Erik Tegner	6–1, 6–1, 7–5

=== Women's doubles ===
Year	Champions	Runners-up	Score
1913	No women's doubles held		
1914	No competition (due to World War I)		
1915	No competition (due to World War I)		
1916	No competition (due to World War I)		
1917	No competition (due to World War I)		
1918	No competition (due to World War I)		
1919	(United Kingdom) Winifred Beamish (United Kingdom) Kitty McKane	(United Kingdom) Dorothy Holman (United Kingdom) Phyllis Howkins	6–3, 6–4
1920	(United Kingdom) Winifred Beamish (United Kingdom) Kitty McKane	(United Kingdom) Doris Craddock (South Africa) Irene Peacock	6–3, 7–5
1921	(Denmark) Elsebeth Brehm Jørgensen (Denmark) Ebba Meyer	(Denmark) Vera Forum (Denmark) Jutta Steenberg	6–2, 4–6, 6–2
1922	(France) Germaine Golding (France) Jeanne Vaussard	(France) Yvonne Bourgeois (France) Mme Canivet	walkover
1923	(United Kingdom) Winifred Beamish (United Kingdom) Kitty McKane	(France) Germaine Golding (France) Jeanne Vaussard	6–1, 6–1

=== Mixed doubles ===
Year	Champions	Runners-up	Score
1913	(France) Max Decugis (France) Kate Fenwick	(Sweden) Gunnar Setterwall (Sweden) Sigrid Fick	7–5, 12–10
1914	No competition (due to World War I)		
1915	No competition (due to World War I)		
1916	No competition (due to World War I)		
1917	No competition (due to World War I)		
1918	No competition (due to World War I)		
1919	(France) Max Decugis (United Kingdom) Winifred Beamish	(France) William Laurentz (France) Germaine Golding	6–3, 6–3
1920	(New Zealand) Frank Fisher (South Africa) Irene Peacock	(Australia) Stanley Doust (United Kingdom) Kitty McKane	walkover
1921	(Denmark) Erik Tegner (Denmark) Elsebeth Brehm	(Denmark) Harald T. Waagepetersen (Denmark) Agnete Goldschmidt	6–2, 6–2
1922	(France) Jean Borotra (France) Germaine Golding	(France) Max Decugis (France) Jeanne Vaussard	6–3, 6–4
1923	(United Kingdom) Walter Crawley (United Kingdom) Kitty McKane	(United Kingdom) Brian Gilbert (United Kingdom) Winifred Beamish	4–6, 6–2, 6–3

== See also ==
- World Hard Court Championships
- World Grass Court Championships (Wimbledon)
- Category:National and multi-national tennis tournaments
