= Maurice Germot =

French tennis player

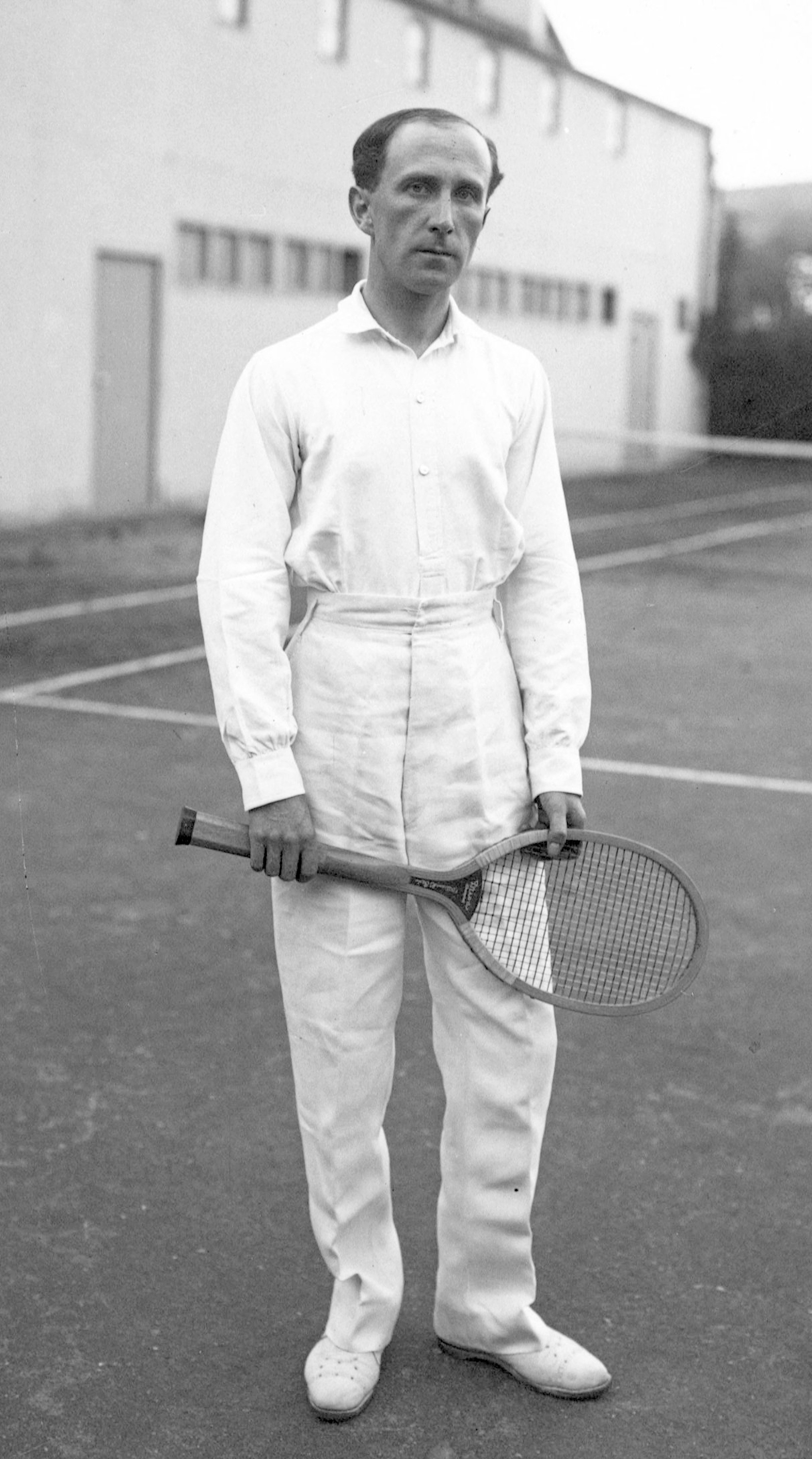
- Germot in 1911
- Full name: Marie Claude Maurice Germot
- Country (sports): France
- Born: 15 November 1882 Vichy, Allier, France
- Died: 6 August 1958 (aged 75) Vichy, Allier, France
- Plays: Right-handed (1-handed backhand)

Singles

Grand Slam singles results
- Wimbledon: QF (1914)

Other tournaments
- WHCC: QF (1914)
- WCCC: F (1913)

Doubles

Other doubles tournaments
- WHCC: W (1914)
- WCCC: W (1913, 1921)
Medal record
tennis
Representing France
Olympic Games
Gold medal – first place	1912 Stockholm	Doubles (indoor)
Intercalated Games
Gold medal – first place	1906 Athens	Doubles
Silver medal – second place	1906 Athens	Singles

Maurice Germot (French: [mɔʁis ʒɛʁmo, moʁ-]; 15 November 1882 – 6 August 1958) was a French tennis player and Olympic champion. He was twice an Olympic Gold medallist in doubles, partnering Max Decugis in 1906 and André Gobert in 1912, and a Silver medallist in singles in 1906.

Germot won the French Championships in 1905, 1906 and 1910, and was a finalist in 1908, 1909 and 1911. (Note: The French Championships during these years was reserved for French club members only and is thus not considered a Grand Slam tournament)

In major events, Germot reached the finals of the World Covered Court Championships, played on a wood court in Stockholm, Sweden in 1913, finishing runner-up to Anthony Wilding but he won this doubles competition three times. He also reached the quarterfinals of the World Hard Court Championships and Wimbledon in 1914.

== World Championships finals ==
=== Singles (1 runner-up) ===
Result	Year	Championship	Surface	Opponent	Score
Loss	1913	World Covered Court Championships	Wood	(New Zealand) Anthony Wilding	7–5, 2–6, 3–6, 1–6

=== Doubles: (3 titles) ===
Result	Year	Championship	Surface	Partner	Opponents	Score
Win	1913	World Covered Court Championships	Wood	(France) Max Decugis	(German Empire) Curt Bergmann (German Empire) Heinrich Kleinschroth	7–5, 2–6, 7–9, 6–3, 6–1
Win	1914	World Hard Court Championships	Clay	(France) Max Decugis	(United Kingdom) Arthur Gore (United Kingdom) Algernon Kingscote	6–1, 11–9, 6–8, 6–2
Win	1921	World Covered Court Championships	Wood	(France) William Laurentz	(Denmark) Paul Henriksen (Denmark) Erik Tegner	6–3, 6–2, 3–6, 6–3
