= Geraldine Beamish =

English tennis player

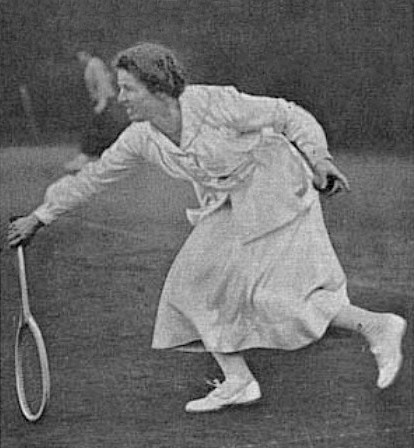
- Full name: Winifred Geraldine Ramsey Beamish
- Country (sports): Great Britain
- Born: 23 June 1883 Forest Gate, London, U.K.
- Died: 10 May 1972 (aged 88) St Pancras, London, U.K.

Singles

Grand Slam singles results
- Wimbledon: SF (1919, 1922, 1923)

Other tournaments
- WCCC: W (1920)
- Olympic Games: 2R (1920)

Doubles

Grand Slam doubles results
- Wimbledon: F (1921)

Other doubles tournaments
- WCCC: W (1919, 1920, 1923)

Mixed doubles

Grand Slam mixed doubles results
- Wimbledon: SF (1920)

Other mixed doubles tournaments
- Olympic Games: 2R (1920)
Medal record
Women's tennis
Olympic Games
Silver medal – second place	1920 Antwerp	Doubles

Winifred Geraldine Ramsey Beamish (née Ramsey; 23 June 1883 – 10 May 1972) was an English tennis player who competed in the 1920 Summer Olympics.

== Biography ==
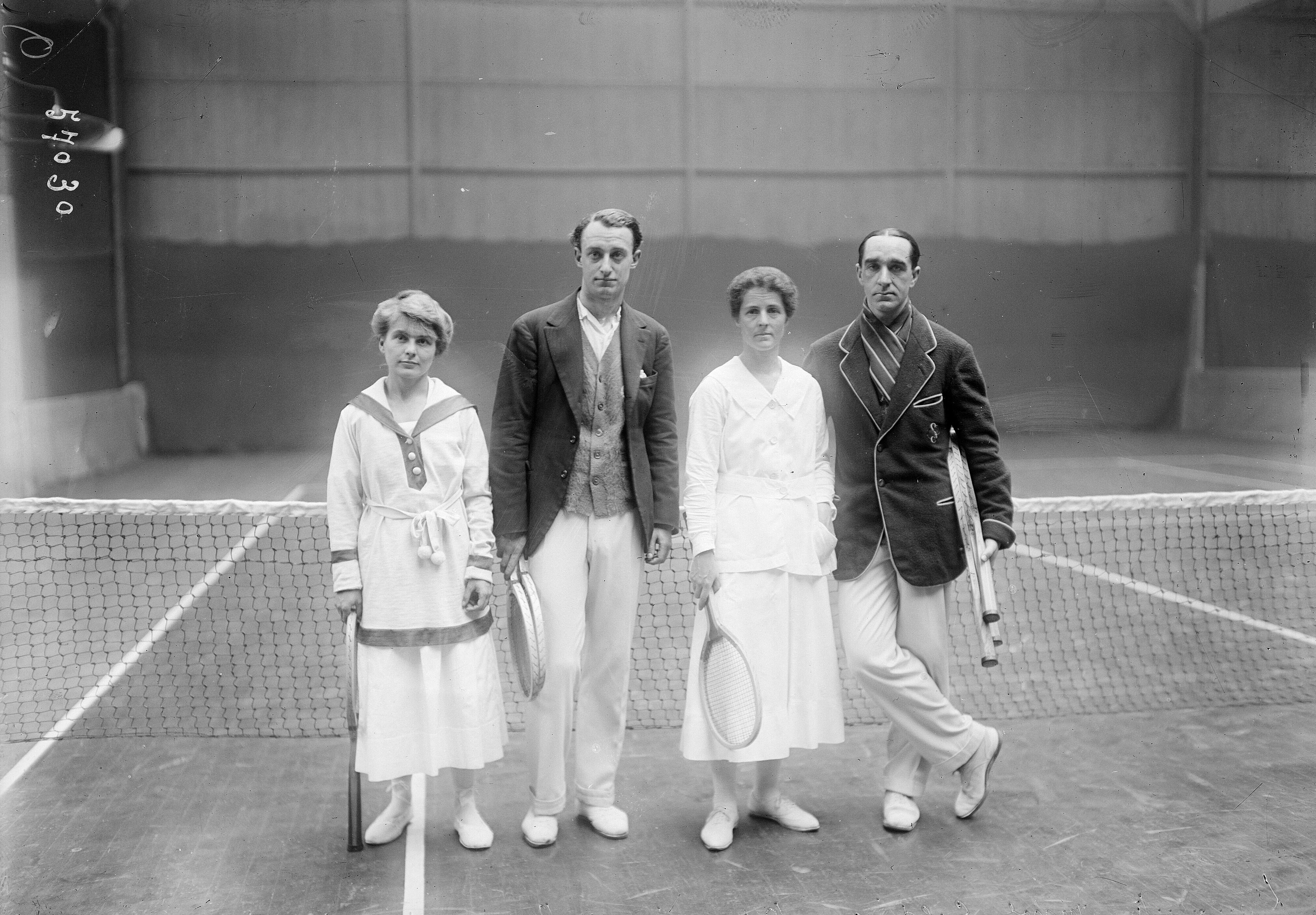
Beamish (2nd from right) with Golding, Laurentz and Decugis in 1919.

Winifred Geraldine Ramsey was born on 23 June 1883 at Forest Gate, London. She married tennis player Alfred Beamish on 30 September 1911.

She competed at The Championships, Wimbledon from 1910 throughout 1933 in each year the tournament was held, reaching the semifinals three times in 1919, 1922 and 1923. In 1919, she lost to Phyllis Satterthwaite, in 1922, she lost to Molla Mallory, and the following year to Suzanne Lenglen.

In 1920, she won the silver medal in the Olympic doubles competition with her partner Dorothy Holman. She also competed in the mixed doubles event with her husband Alfred, but they were eliminated in the second round. In the singles competition she had a walkover in the first round and was eliminated in the second round by her doubles partner Dorothy Holman.

One of her greatest triumphs was her title at the World Covered Court Championship (WCCC) in 1920, where she defeated Kathleen McKane Godfree in the final in three sets. Along with McKane Godfree, she won the WCCC doubles title in 1919, 1920, and 1923.

She died on 10 May 1972 at St Pancras, London.

== Grand Slam finals ==
=== Doubles (1 runner-up) ===
Result	Year	Championship	Surface	Partner	Opponents	Score
Loss	1921	Wimbledon	Grass	(South Africa) Irene Bowder Peacock	(France) Suzanne Lenglen (United States) Elizabeth Ryan	1–6, 2–6

== World championships finals ==
=== Singles (1 title) ===
Result	Year	Championship	Surface	Opponent	Score
Win	1920	World Covered Court Championships	Wood	(United Kingdom) Kathleen McKane	6–2, 5–7, 9–7

=== Doubles (4 titles, 1 runner-up) ===
Result	Year	Championship	Surface	Partner	Opponents	Score
Win	1919	World Covered Court Championships	Wood	(United Kingdom) Kathleen McKane	(United Kingdom) Dorothy Holman (United Kingdom) Phyllis Covell	6–3, 6–4
Win	1920	World Covered Court Championships	Wood	(United Kingdom) Kathleen McKane	(United Kingdom) Doris Craddock (South Africa) Irene Bowder Peacock	6–3, 7–5
Loss	1922	World Hard Court Championships	Wood	(United Kingdom) Kathleen McKane	(France) Suzanne Lenglen (United States) Elizabeth Ryan	0–6, 4–6
Win	1923	World Hard Court Championships	Clay	(United Kingdom) Kathleen McKane	(France) Germaine Golding (France) Suzanne Lenglen	6–2, 6–3
Win	1923	World Covered Court Championships	Wood	(United Kingdom) Kathleen McKane	(France) Germaine Golding (France) Jeanne Vaussard	6–1, 6–1

=== Mixed doubles (1 title) ===
Result	Year	Championship	Surface	Partner	Opponents	Score
Win	1919	World Covered Court Championships	Wood	(United Kingdom) Max Decugis	(France) Germaine Golding (France) William Laurentz	6–3, 6–3
Loss	1922	World Hard Court Championships	Clay	(United Kingdom) John Gilbert	(France) Suzanne Lenglen (France) Henri Cochet	4–6, 6–4, 0–6
