= Erik Tegner =

Danish tennis player

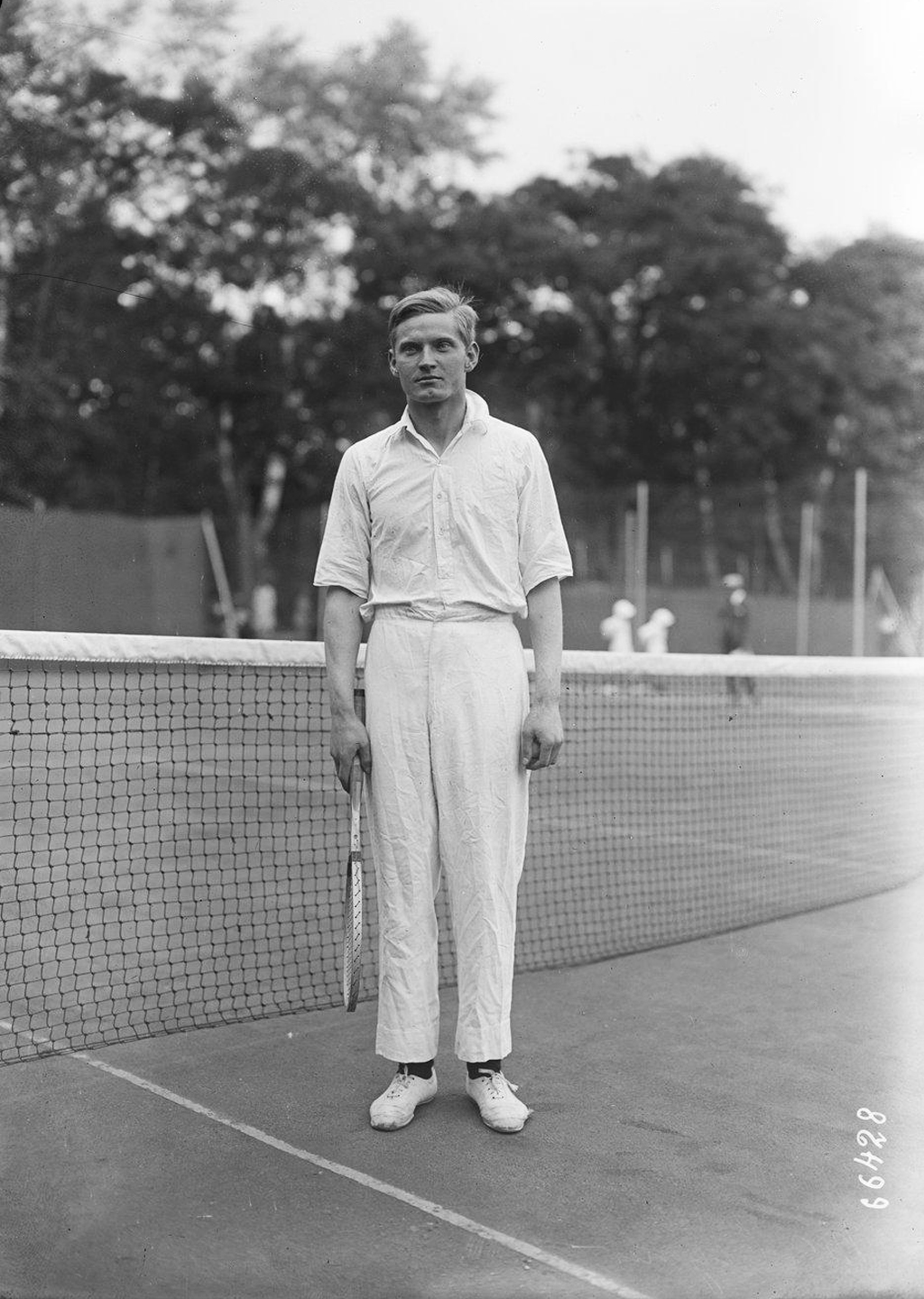
- Tegner in 1921
- Country (sports): Denmark
- Born: 29 October 1896 Bangkok, Rattanakosin Kingdom
- Died: 9 September 1965 (aged 68) Reading, Great Britain

Singles

Other tournaments
- Olympic Games: 2R (1920, 1924)

Doubles

Grand Slam doubles results
- Wimbledon: 2R (1920)

Other doubles tournaments
- WCCC: F (1921, 1923)
- Olympic Games: 3R (1920)

Mixed doubles

Grand Slam mixed doubles results
- Wimbledon: 3R (1920)
- Olympic Games: 4th (1920)

Erik Tegner (29 October 1896 – 9 September 1965) was a Danish tennis player who competed in the singles event at the 1920 Summer Olympics and 1924 Summer Olympics, reaching the second round on both occasions. With compatriot Amory Hansen he reached the semifinal of the mixed doubles event in 1920 in which they lost to eventual Olympic champions Suzanne Lenglen and Max Decugis. In the bronze medal match they lost to Milada Skrbková and Ladislav Žemla-Rázný.

Tegner competed in the singles and doubles events at the 1920 Wimbledon Championships, reaching the second and third rounds, respectively.

Tegner teamed up with countrywoman Elsebeth Brehm to win the mixed doubles title at the 1921 World Covered Court Championships in Copenhagen. He competed in the doubles event with compatriot Paul Henriksen, and they were runners-up to the French pairing Maurice Germot and William Laurentz. At the 1923 edition of the World Covered Court Championships, held in Barcelona, he played in the doubles event with Leif Rovsing and were again runners-up, this time to the French team of Henri Cochet and Jean Couiteas.

== World Championships finals ==
=== Doubles: 2 runner-ups ===
Result	Year	Championship	Surface	Partner	Opponents	Score
Loss	1921	World Covered Court Championships	Wood	(Denmark) Paul Henriksen	(France) William Laurentz (France) Maurice Germot	3–6, 2–6, 6–3, 3–6
Loss	1923	World Covered Court Championships	Wood	(Denmark) Leif Rovsing	(France) Henri Cochet (France) Jean Couiteas	1–6, 1–6, 5–7
