= Jean Couiteas de Faucamberge =

French tennis player

- Full name: Jean-Raymond Couiteas de Faucamberge
- Country (sports): France
- Born: 24 September 1901; La Marsa, French Tunisia
- Died: 24 December 1963 (aged 62); Paris, France

Singles

Grand Slam singles results
- French Open: 3R (1930)

Other tournaments
- WCCC: QF (1923)

Doubles

Other doubles tournaments
- WCCC: W (1923)

Jean-Raymond Couiteas de Faucamberge (né Couiteas; 24 September 1901 – 24 December 1963) was a tennis player from France. He competed in the International Lawn Tennis Challenge in 1922 and 1924. He later developed a relationship with the American heiress Gertrude Sanford Legendre.

== ILTF finals ==
=== Doubles (1) ===
Result	Year	Championship	Surface	Partner	Opponents	Score
Win	1923	World Covered Court Championships	Wood	(France) Henri Cochet	(Denmark) Leif Rovsing (Denmark) Erik Tegner	6–1, 6–1, 7–5
