= Francisca Subirana =

Spanish tennis player (1900–1981)

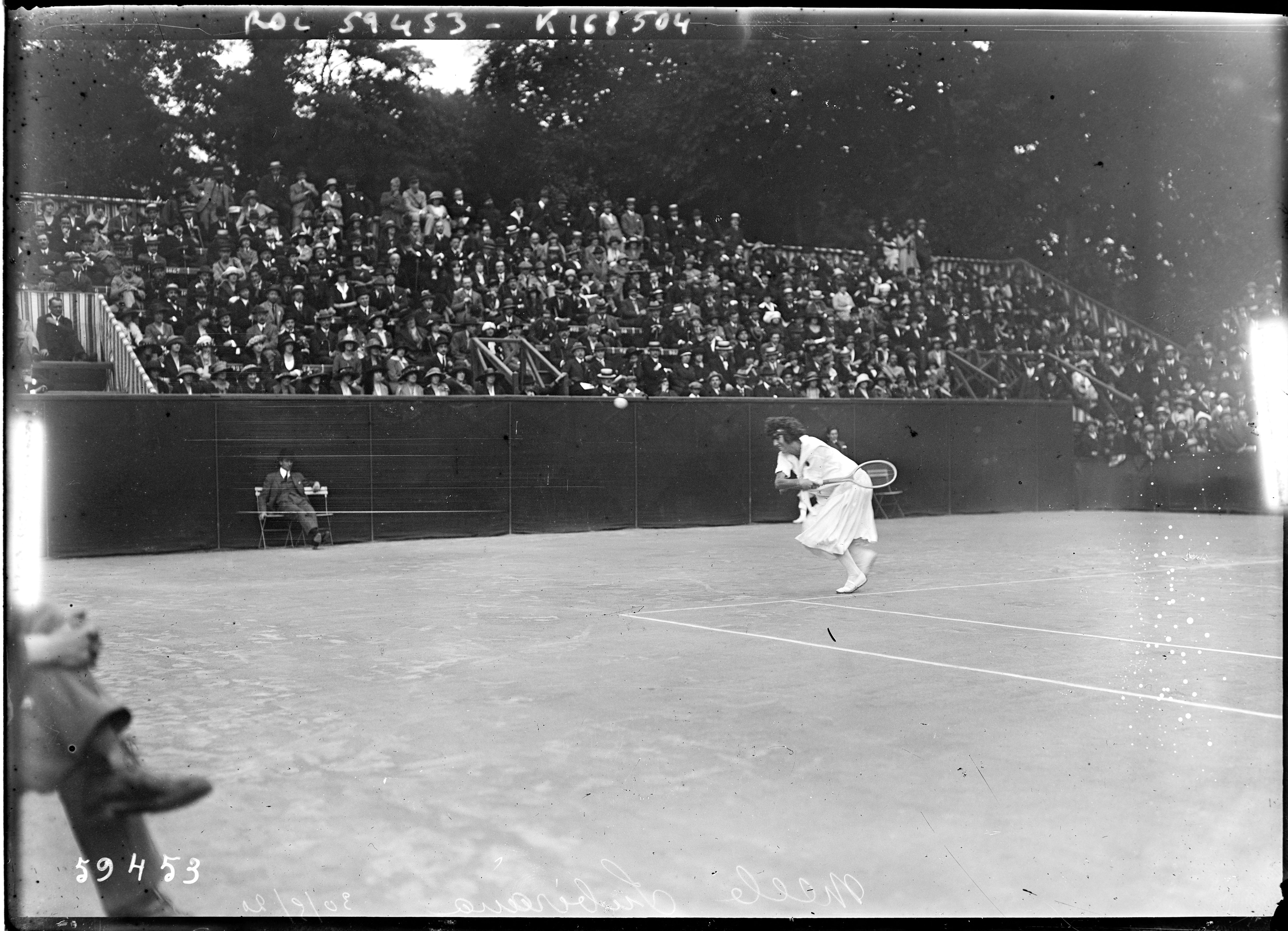
- Subirana at the 1920 World Hard Court Championships
- Full name: Francisca Subirana Wolf
- Country (sports): Spain
- Born: 24 January 1900 Barcelona, Spain
- Died: March 1981 (aged 81) Herzliya, Israel
- Retired: 1922

Singles

Other tournaments
- WHCC: F (1920)
- Olympic Games: 1R (1920)

Doubles
- Olympic Games: 1R (1920)

Mixed doubles
- Olympic Games: 1R (1920)

Francisca "Panchita" Subirana Wolf (also y Lobo; 24 January 1900 – March 1981) was a Spanish tennis player.

== Biography ==
Subirana was born in Barcelona. She won the city's tennis tournament five seasons (1916 - 1920). In 1920, she reached the final of the World Hard Court Championships which she lost to Dorothy Holman in straight sets. She was in the Spanish squad for the 1920 Summer Olympics at Antwerp but did not play her first match against Winifred McNair.

Around 1922, Subirana retired from tennis. In 1924, she married Ricardo Wolf (1887–1981), a German Jewish immigrant, in Cuba (where their names were changed to y Lobo, the Spanish word for "wolf"). In 1961, the couple moved to Israel where Ricardo was assigned the Cuban ambassador by Fidel Castro. After Ricardo retired from his diplomatic post in 1973, the Wolfs spent the rest of their lives in Israel. In 1975, they founded the Wolf Foundation which awards the Wolf Prize since 1978. Ricardo Wolf died at Herzliya in February 1981, and Francisca died there one month later at an age of 81.

== World Championships finals ==
=== Singles (1 runner-up) ===
Result	Year	Championship	Surface	Opponent	Score
Loss	1920	World Hard Court Championships	Clay	(United Kingdom) Dorothy Holman	0–6, 5–7
