= Dorothy Holman =

British tennis player

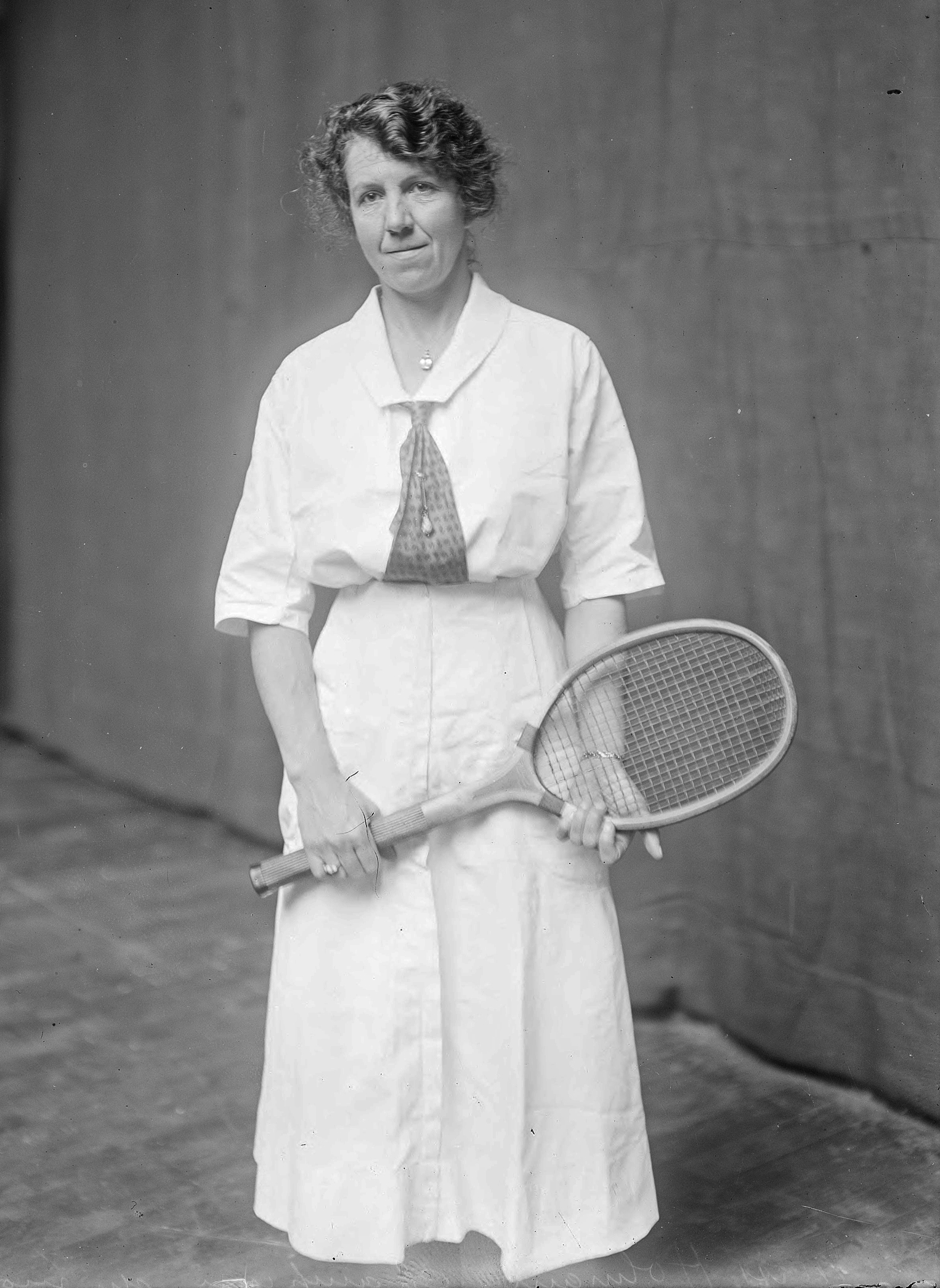
- Full name: Edith Dorothy Holman
- Country (sports): Great Britain
- Born: 18 July 1883 Kilburn, London, England
- Died: 15 June 1968 (aged 84) London, England
- Plays: Right-handed

Singles

Grand Slam singles results
- Wimbledon: SF (1912, 1913)

Other tournaments
- WHCC: W (1920)
- WCCC: W (1919)

Doubles

Grand Slam doubles results
- Wimbledon: SF (1919, 1922)

Other doubles tournaments
- WHCC: W (1920)
- WCCC: F (1919)

Grand Slam mixed doubles results
- Wimbledon: QF (1913)
Medal record
Olympic Games – Tennis
Silver medal – second place	1920 Antwerp	Singles
Silver medal – second place	1920 Antwerp	Doubles

Edith Dorothy Holman (18 July 1883 – 15 June 1968) was a British tennis player and three time ILTF world champion twice in singles winning the World Covered Court Championships in 1919, and the World Hard Court Championships in 1920 and once in doubles the same year. In addition, she was a double silver medalist at the 1920 Summer Olympics (singles and doubles).

== Career ==
Holman was born in Kilburn, London. In 1920, she won the silver medal in the singles event and in the doubles competition with her partner Geraldine Beamish. She also competed in the mixed doubles event with Gordon Lowe, but they were eliminated in the first round. In 1919, she won the singles title at the World Covered Court Championship, played on wooden courts at the Sporting Club de Paris, defeating Germaine Regnier Golding in the final in straight sets. She also won the World Hard Court Championship in 1920, defeating Francisca Subirana in straight sets.

Her best result at the Wimbledon Championships came in 1912 and 1913 when she reached the semifinal of the singles event, which she lost to Charlotte Copper Sterry and Winifred Slocock McNair respectively.

Her other career singles highlights include winning the Aldeburgh Open, (1909), British Covered Court Championships, played at the Queen's Club in London, on four occasions (1912, 1914, 1921 and 1922), and the Drive Club Tournament at Fulham on hard cement four times (1912, 1920, 1922-1923).

== World Championships finals ==
=== Singles (2 titles) ===
Result	Year	Championship	Surface	Opponent	Score
Win	1919	World Covered Court Championships	Wood	(United Kingdom) Germaine Golding	6–3, 6–4
Win	1920	World Hard Court Championships	Clay	(Spain) Francisca Subirana	6–0, 7–5

=== Doubles (1 title, 2 runner-ups) ===
Result	Year	Championship	Surface	Partner	Opponents	Score
Loss	1919	World Covered Court Championships	Wood	(United Kingdom) Phyllis Howkins	(United Kingdom) Winifred Beamish (United Kingdom) Kitty McKane	3–6, 4–6
Win	1920	World Hard Court Championships	Clay	(United Kingdom) Phyllis Satterthwaite	(France) Germaine Golding (France) Jeanne Vaussard	6–3, 6–1
Loss	1921	World Hard Court Championships	Clay	(South Africa) Irene Peacock	(France) Germaine Golding (France) Suzanne Lenglen	2–6, 2–6
