= Germaine Golding =

French tennis player

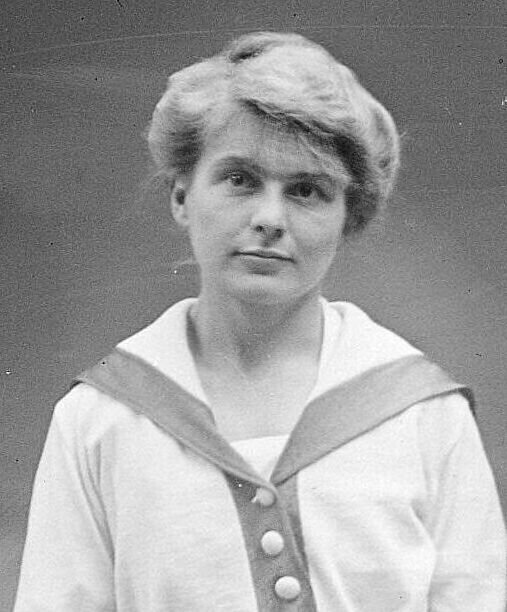
- Golding (1919)
- Full name: Anne Germaine Golding
- Country (sports): France
- Born: 6 June 1887 Dijon, France
- Died: 14 August 1973 (aged 86) Boulogne-Billancourt, France
- Plays: Right-handed

Singles

Grand Slam singles results
- French Open: 3R (1925, 1930)
- Wimbledon: 1R (1923)
- WHCC: F (1914)
- WCCC: W (1922)

Doubles

Grand Slam doubles results
- French Open: QF (1925)
- Wimbledon: 1R (1923)
- WHCC: W (1921)
- WCCC: W (1922)

Mixed doubles

Grand Slam mixed doubles results
- French Open: 2R (1930)
- WHCC: W (1920)
- WCCC: W (1922)

Anne Germaine Golding (French pronunciation: [ʒɛʁmɛn gɔldiŋ]; née Régnier; 6 June 1887 – 14 August 1973) was a French tennis player who was mainly active during the interwar period and achieved most of her tournament wins on indoor courts.

== Personal life ==
Golding was born on 6 June 1887 in Dijon, daughter of Jean Marie Georges Régnier, a trader, and Camille Berthe Dietz. She married George Jackson Lewis Golding from the United Kingdom on 5 March 1912 in the 16th arrondissement of Paris. Golding lived in London and was an officer in the British colonial army.

== Career ==
Golding was a finalist at the French Championships singles event on four occasions, before the tournament became open to international players. In 1910 she lost in a close three-set match to Jeanne Matthey. In 1921 she withdrew from her final against Suzanne Lenglen, while in 1922 and 1923 she lost to Lenglen in straight sets.

Golding reached the singles final of the 1914 World Hard Court Championships in Paris which she lost to 15-year-old Suzanne Lenglen in straight sets. Her greatest success were her three titles in singles, doubles and mixed doubles at the 1922 World Covered Court Championship, played on wood courts in St. Moritz, Switzerland. In the singles final she was too strong for Jeanne Vaussard and she won the doubles title with Vaussard after a walkover in the final. In the mixed doubles she partnered with Jean Borotra and defeated compatriots Max Decugis and Vaussard in the final in two sets.

In August 1922 she won the singles title at the Swiss International Championships, that year also held in St. Moritz, which she had also won the previous year and would win for a third time in 1924. In addition she finished as runner-up at the event in 1911 and 1917.

At the 1924 Summer Olympics at Paris, she lost her semifinals match of the singles event against eventual champion Helen Wills as well as the following match for bronze against Kathleen McKane.

Golding reached the singles final of the French Covered Court Championships, played on indoor wood courts at the Tennis Club de Paris, on 11 occasions, winning the title seven times between 1911 and 1931.

After the French Championships were opened for international players in 1925, Golding had problems to compete. She played at Paris for the last time in 1933, losing to Sylvie Jung Henrotin in the second round.

== World Championships finals ==
=== Singles (1 title, 2 runner-ups) ===
Result	Year	Championship	Surface	Opponents	Score
Loss	1914	World Hard Court Championships	Clay	(France) Suzanne Lenglen	2–6, 1–6
Loss	1919	World Covered Court Championships	Wood	(United Kingdom) Dorothy Holman	3–6, 4–6
Win	1922	World Covered Court Championships	Wood	(France) Jeanne Vaussard	6–2, 7–5

=== Doubles (2 titles, 2 runner-ups) ===
Result	Year	Championship	Surface	Partner	Opponents	Score
Loss	1920	World Hard Court Championships	Clay	(France) Jeanne Vaussard	(United Kingdom) Dorothy Holman (United Kingdom) Phyllis Satterthwaite	3–6, 1–6
Win	1921	World Hard Court Championships	Clay	(France) Suzanne Lenglen	(United Kingdom) Dorothy Holman (South Africa) Irene Peacock	6–2, 6–2
Win	1922	World Covered Court Championships	Wood	(France) Jeanne Vaussard	(Switzerland) Canivet (France) Yvonne Bourgeois	walkover
Loss	1923	World Covered Court Championships	Wood	(France) Jeanne Vaussard	(United Kingdom) Geraldine Beamish (United Kingdom) Kathleen McKane	1–6, 1–6

=== Mixed doubles (2 titles, 1 runner-up) ===
Result	Year	Championship	Surface	Partner	Opponents	Score
Loss	1919	World Covered Court Championships	Wood	(France) William Laurentz	(United Kingdom) Geraldine Beamish (France) Max Decugis	3–6, 3–6
Win	1920	World Hard Court Championships	Clay	(France) William Laurentz	(France) Suzanne Amblard (France) Max Decugis	walkover
Win	1922	World Covered Court Championships	Wood	(France) Jean Borotra	(France) Jeanne Vaussard (France) Max Decugis	6–3, 6–4
