= William Laurentz =

French tennis player

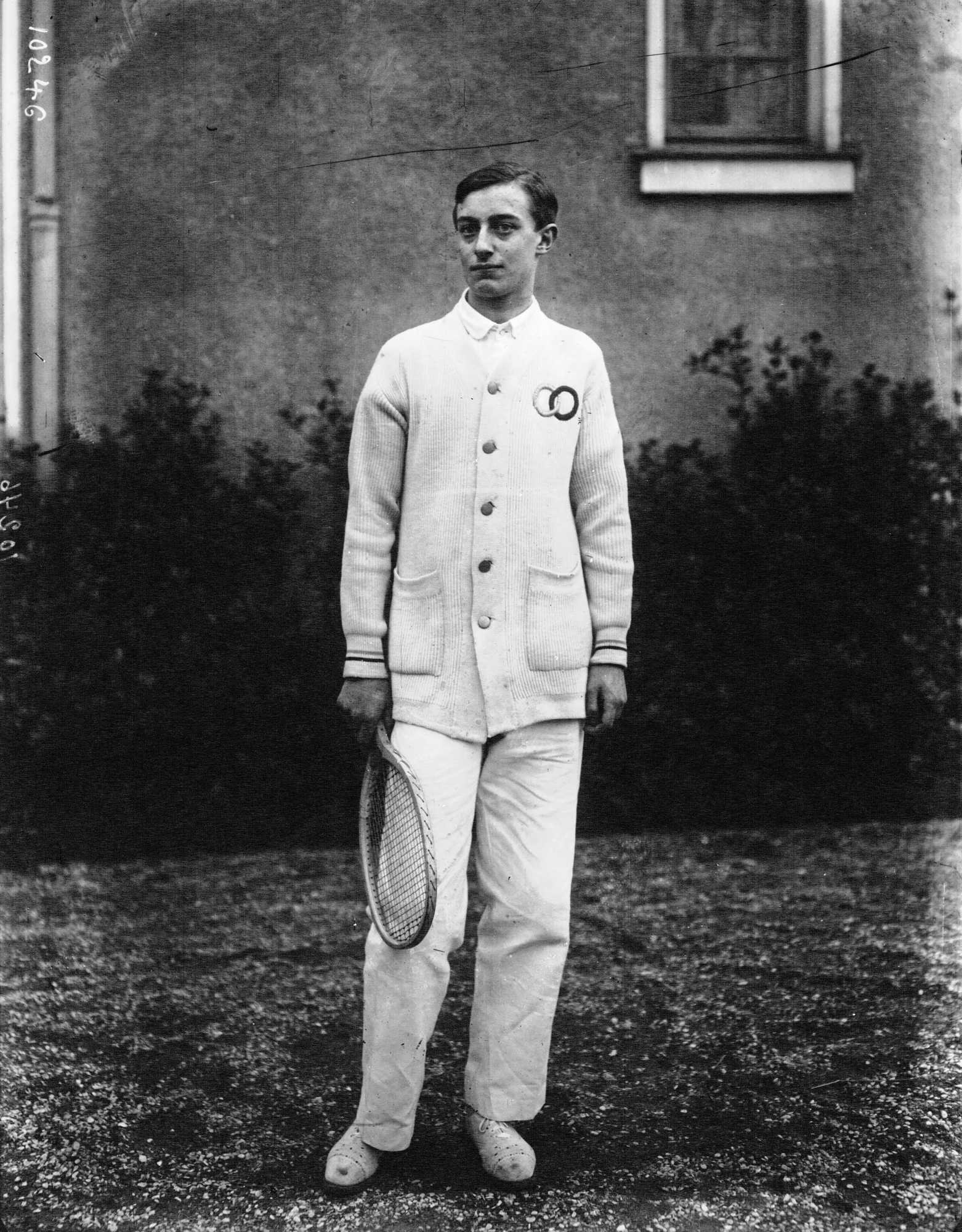
- Full name: William Hector Auguste Edmond Laurentz
- Country (sports): France
- Born: 26 February 1895; Paris, France
- Died: 7 March 1922 (aged 27); Paris, France
- Plays: Right-handed

Singles
- Highest ranking: No. 8 (1920) by A. Wallis Myers

Grand Slam singles results
- Wimbledon: 3R (1920)

Other tournaments
- WHCC: W (1920)
- WCCC: W (1921)

Doubles

Grand Slam doubles results
- Wimbledon: 3R (1919)

Other doubles tournaments
- WHCC: W (1920, 1921)
- WCCC: W (1919, 1921)

Mixed doubles

Grand Slam mixed doubles results
- Wimbledon: QF (1919)

Other mixed doubles tournaments
- WHCC: W (1920)
- WCCC: F (1919)

William Laurentz (French pronunciation: [wiljam lɔʁɑ̃ts]; 26 Feb 1895 – 7 March 1922) was a French tennis player of the early 20th century whose main achievements were winning the singles title at the World Hard Court Championships and World Covered Court Championships.

== Career ==
Laurentz achieved his breakthrough in April 1911 at age 16 when he defeated the Wimbledon champion Anthony Wilding in the final of the French Covered Court Championships in Paris.

In March 1912 he was playing in the Challenge Round of the Championship of France against Andre Gobert when at 2–4 in the first set a ball that glanced off his racket struck him in the eye. Subsequently, the eye had to be removed.

He notably won the mixed doubles at the French Championships in 1912 and 1913, partnering Daisy Speranza, when the tournament was open only to French residents, and the singles at the International Lawn Tennis Federation's (ILTF) 1920 World Hard Court Championships (WHCC). In the final of the latter, played on clay courts at the Stade Français in Paris, he beat Andre Gobert in four sets. Together with Gobert he additionally won the men's doubles title at the WHCC in 1920 and 1921. In 1921 he won the singles title at the World Covered Court Championships (WCCC), played in Copenhagen on an indoor wood surface, beating Alfred Beamish in the final in straight sets.

Laurentz participated at the Wimbledon Championships for the first time in 1919, losing in straight sets in the first round to Algernon Kingscote. His best Wimbledon result came the following year, 1920, when he reached the third round in which he was defeated by his compatriot Jacques Brugnon in four sets. He was entered for the 1921 Championships but withdrew before his first round match against Andre Gobert.

He was ranked world No. 8 for 1920 by A. Wallis Myers of The Daily Telegraph. That year he won the singles title at Boulogne. In 1921 he was runner-up to Manuel Alonso Areizaga in Barcelona, losing the final in straight sets.

Between 1912 and 1921 he played in five ties for the French Davis Cup team and has a record of three wins and seven defeats.

Laurentz died suddenly in Paris on 7 March 1922 of septicaemia following upon influenza.

== Playing style ==
In his book The Art of Lawn Tennis (1920) Bill Tilden described Laurentz as "another brilliant, erratic and intensely interesting figure that France has given the tennis world..." who played mostly by instinct. Tilden describes Laurentz' service as one of "several varieties, all well played. He uses an American twist as his regular delivery, but varies it with a sharp slice, a reverse twist of great spin, and a fast cannon-ball smash." His volleying was "brilliant...but very erratic" and his overhead smashes were judged likewise. He had great fighting skills and played at his best when behind but was prone to anxiety lapses. Tilden concludes that "Laurentz might beat anyone in the world on his day or lose to the veriest dub when at his worst.".

== World Championships finals ==
=== Singles (2 titles) ===
Result	Year	Championship	Surface	Opponent	Score
Win	1920	World Hard Court Championships	Clay	(France) Andre Gobert	9–7, 6–2, 3–6, 6–2
Win	1921	World Covered Court Championships	Wood	(United Kingdom) Alfred Beamish	6–2, 6–4, 6–2

=== Doubles: (4 titles) ===
Result	Year	Championship	Surface	Partner	Opponents	Score
Win	1919	World Covered Court Championships	Wood	(France) André Gobert	(Romania) Nicolae Mișu (United Kingdom) H. Portlock	6–1, 6–0, 6–2
Win	1920	World Hard Court Championships	Clay	(France) André Gobert	(South Africa) Cecil Blackbeard (Romania) Nicolae Mișu	6–4, 6–2, 6–1
Win	1921	World Covered Court Championships	Wood	(France) Maurice Germot	(Denmark) Paul Henriksen (Denmark) Erik Tegner	6–3, 6–2, 3–6, 6–3
Win	1921	World Hard Court Championships	Clay	(France) André Gobert	(France) Pierre Albarran (France) Alain Gerbault	6–4, 6–2, 6–8, 6–2

=== Mixed doubles: (1 titles, 2 runner-ups) ===
Result	Year	Championship	Surface	Partner	Opponents	Score
Loss	1919	World Covered Court Championships	Wood	(France) Germaine Golding	(France) Max Decugis (United Kingdom) Winifred Beamish	3–6, 3–6
Win	1920	World Hard Court Championships	Clay	(France) Germaine Golding	(France) Max Decugis (France) Suzanne Amblard	walkover
Loss	1921	World Hard Court Championships	Clay	(France) Germaine Golding	(France) Max Decugis (France) Suzanne Lenglen	3–6, 2–6
