= André Gobert =

French tennis player (1890–1951)

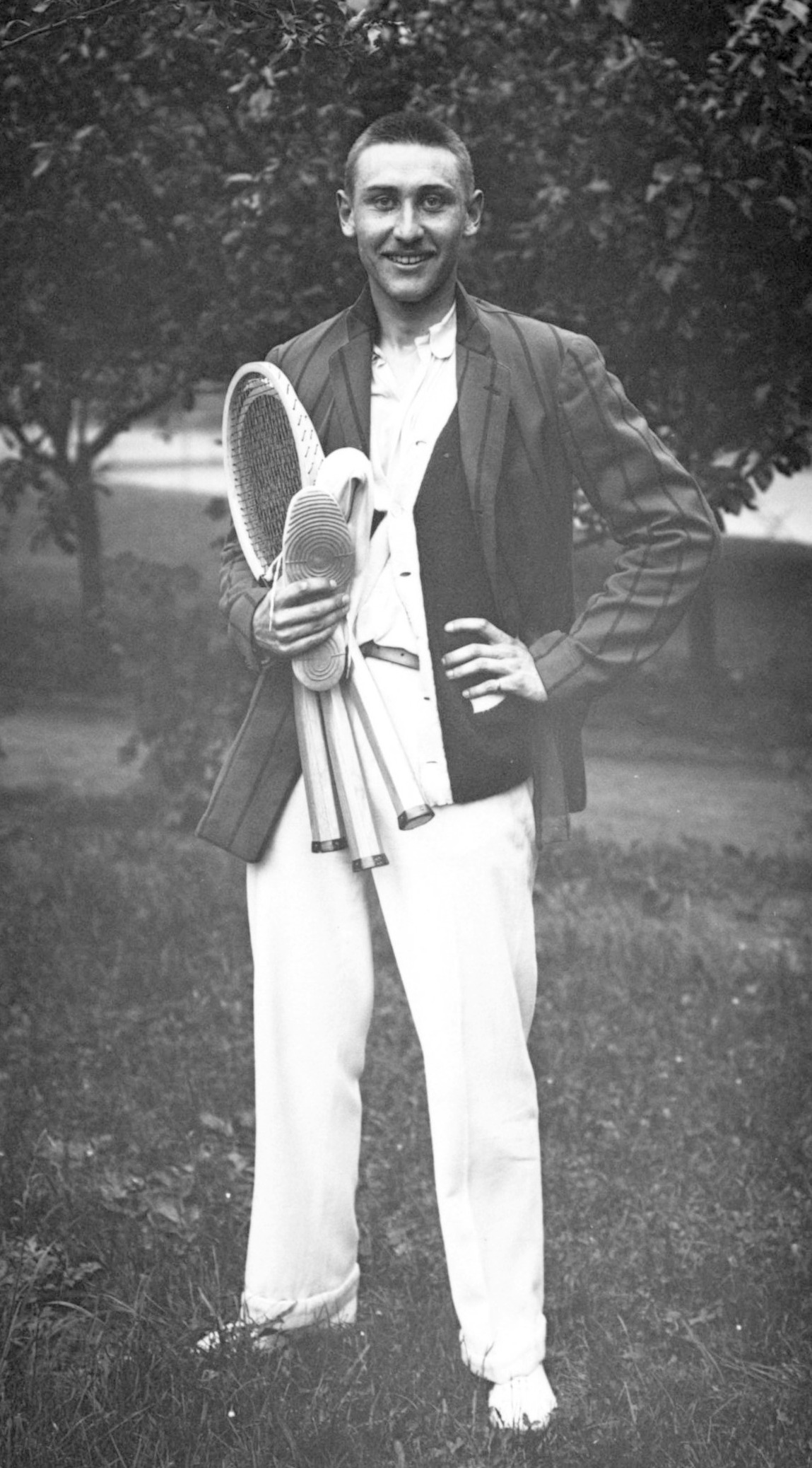
- Full name: André Maurice Henri Gobert
- Country (sports): France
- Born: 30 September 1890; Paris, France
- Died: 6 December 1951 (aged 61); Paris, France
- Turned pro: 1909 (amateur tour)
- Retired: 1926
- Plays: Left-handed (one-handed backhand)

Singles
- Career record: 168–53 (76%)
- Career titles: 26
- Highest ranking: No. 3 (1919, A. Wallis Myers)

Grand Slam singles results
- French Open: QF (1925)
- Wimbledon: F (1912^{(AC)})

Other tournaments
- WHCC: F (1913, 1920)
- WCCC: W (1919)

Doubles

Grand Slam doubles results
- Wimbledon: W (1911)

Other doubles tournaments
- WHCC: W (1920, 1921)
- WCCC: W (1919)
Medal record
Summer Olympics
Gold medal – first place	1912 Stockholm	Singles (indoor)
Gold medal – first place	1912 Stockholm	Doubles (indoor)

André Henri Gobert (30 September 1890 – 6 December 1951) was a tennis player from France. Gobert is a double Olympic tennis champion of 1912. At the Stockholm Games, he won both the men's singles and doubles indoor gold medals.

== Career ==
Gobert first started playing tennis at age 11.

He was a two-time winner of the French Championships in 1911 and 1920, when the tournament was only open to amateur tennis players who had a membership with a French tennis club. He also won the International Lawn Tennis Federation's World Covered Court Championship (Indoor Wood) in 1919. Also twice runner-up at the World Hard Court Championships on Clay (1913 and 1920). He won the indoor tennis gold medal at the 1912 Olympic Games. Gobert reached the Wimbledon All-Comers final in 1912, beating James Cecil Parke and Max Decugis, then lost to Arthur Gore.

He won the singles title at the British Covered Court Championships, played on wooden courts at the Queen's Club in London, five times; in 1911, 1912, 1920, 1921 and 1922. In 1910, he won the All England Plate at Wimbledon, the competition for players who were defeated in the first and second rounds of the singles competition.

Between 1912 and 1922, Gobert played for the French Davis Cup team in five ties and compiled a record of three wins and 11 losses.

== Grand Slam finals ==
=== Doubles: 2 (1 titles, 1 runner-up) ===
Result	Year	Championship	Surface	Partner	Opponents	Score
Win	1911	Wimbledon	Grass	(France) Max Decugis	(United Kingdom) Major Ritchie (New Zealand) Anthony Wilding	9–7, 5–7, 6–3, 2–6, 6–2
Loss	1912	Wimbledon	Grass	(France) Max Decugis	(United Kingdom) Charles P. Dixon (United Kingdom) Herbert Roper-Barrett	6–3, 3–6, 4–6, 5–7

== World Championships finals ==
=== Singles (1 title, 2 runner-ups) ===
Result	Year	Championship	Surface	Opponent	Score
Loss	1913	World Hard Court Championships	Clay	(New Zealand) Anthony Wilding	3–6, 3–6, 6–1, 4–6
Loss	1920	World Hard Court Championships	Clay	(France) William Laurentz	7–9, 2–6, 6–3, 2–6
Win	1920	World Covered Court Championships	Wood	(France) Max Decugis	6–3, 6–2, 6–2

=== Doubles: (3 titles) ===
Result	Year	Championship	Surface	Partner	Opponents	Score
Win	1919	World Covered Court Championships	Wood	(France) William Laurentz	(Romania) Nicolae Mișu (United Kingdom) H. Portlock	6–1, 6–0, 6–2
Win	1920	World Hard Court Championships	Clay	(France) William Laurentz	(South Africa) Cecil Blackbeard (Romania) Nicolae Mișu	6–4, 6–2, 6–1
Win	1921	World Hard Court Championships	Clay	(France) William Laurentz	(France) Pierre Albarran (France) Alain Gerbault	6–4, 6–2, 6–8, 6–2
