= Max Decugis =

French tennis player (1882–1978)

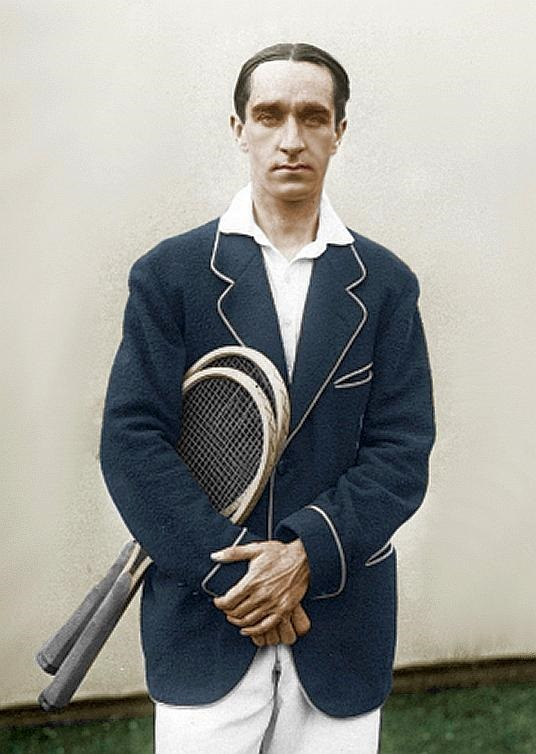
- Decugis in 1913
- Full name: Maxime Omer Mathieu Decugis
- Country (sports): France
- Born: 24 September 1882 Paris, France
- Died: 6 September 1978 (aged 95) Biot, France
- Turned pro: 1900 (amateur)
- Retired: 1926
- Plays: Right-handed (one-handed backhand)

Singles
- Career record: 241–64 (79.02%)
- Career titles: 41
- Highest ranking: No. 10 (1913, A. Wallis Myers)

Grand Slam singles results
- French Open: 1R (1925)
- Wimbledon: SF (1911, 1912)
- US Open: 1R (1925)

Other tournaments
- WHCC: SF (1913, 1914)
- WCCC: F (1919)

Doubles
- Career record: 0–0

Grand Slam doubles results
- Wimbledon: W (1911)

Other doubles tournaments
- WHCC: W (1914)
- WCCC: W (1913)

Mixed doubles

Other mixed doubles tournaments
- WHCC: W (1912, 1913, 1914, 1921)
- WCCC: W (1913, 1919)

Team competitions
- Davis Cup: F (1904)
Medal record
Olympic Games
Representing a Mixed team
Silver medal – second place	1900 Paris	Men's doubles
Representing France
Gold medal – first place	1920 Antwerp	Mixed doubles
Bronze medal – third place	1920 Antwerp	Men's doubles
Intercalated Games
Gold medal – first place	1906 Athens	Singles
Gold medal – first place	1906 Athens	Doubles
Gold medal – first place	1906 Athens	Mixed doubles

Maxime Omer Mathieu Décugis, sometimes spellt Decugis (French pronunciation: [maksim dekyʒiz]; 24 September 1882 – 6 September 1978) was a French tennis player. He won the French Championships eight times (a French club members-only tournament before 1925). He also won three Olympic medals at the 1900 Paris Olympics and the 1920 Antwerp Olympics, with a gold medal in the mixed doubles partnering Suzanne Lenglen.

== Life ==
Decugis' father was a merchant at Les Halles, the company's name was Omer Décugis et fils, however the accent mark on the é is missing from Max Decugis' birth certificate, and appears inconsistently in later English-speaking sources. The origin of the family name Décugis, spelled with accented é in an 1842 source, is "from Cuges-les-Pins."

In 1905, he married Marie Flameng, the daughter of painter François Flameng, in Paris. After the death of Marie in 1969, Max married Suzanne Louise Duval in October.

== Career ==
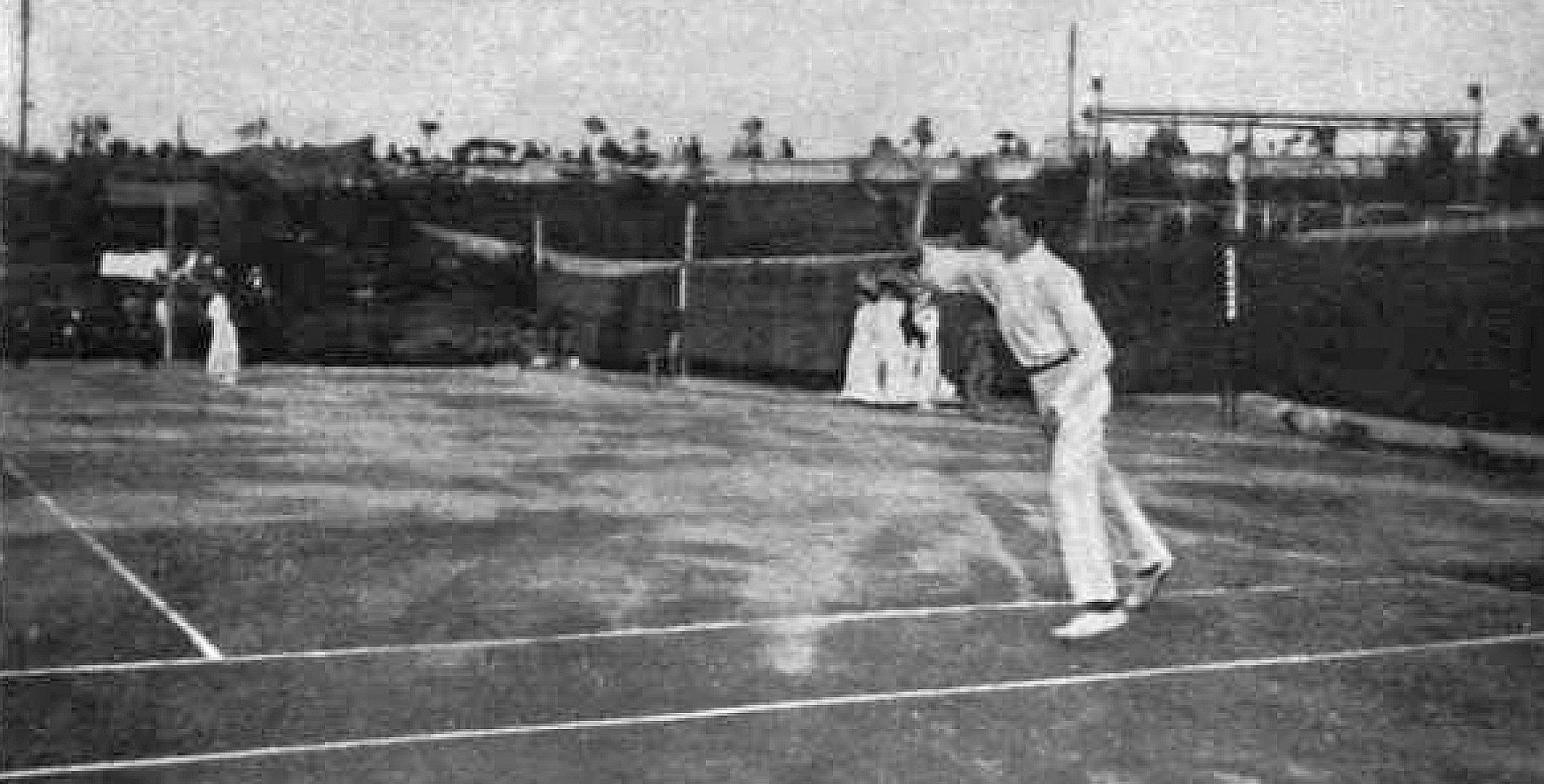
Decugis playing at the Margitsziget court in Budapest, Hungary in 1908

Decugis won the French Championships in 1903, 1904, 1907, 1908, 1909, 1912, 1913, and 1914 (also 14 times in doubles and seven times in mixed). The interruption of World War I denied Decugis the opportunity to defend his 1914 title. Decugis was also a four-time runner-up, having lost the final in 1902, 1906, 1920, and 1923. He won the International German Championship in 1901 and 1902.

In major tournaments, Decugis reached the semifinals of both the 1911 and 1912 Wimbledon Championships and the 1913 and 1914 World Hard Court Championships (WHCC) and the final of the World Covered Court Championship (WCCC) in 1919. He won the mixed doubles title at the WHCC on four occasions (1912, 1913, 1914, 1921) and at the WCCC on two (1913, 1919).

In May 1910, Decugis twice defeated Anthony Wilding at Wiesbaden, first in the final of the Wiesbaden Cup in four sets, followed by a victory in the final of the Wiesbaden Championship in three straight sets.

A. Wallis Myers of The Daily Telegraph ranked Decugis as world No. 10 in both 1913 and 1914.

== Grand Slam finals ==
=== Doubles: 2 (1 title, 1 runner-up) ===
Result	Year	Championship	Surface	Partner	Opponents	Score
Win	1911	Wimbledon	Grass	(France) André Gobert	(United Kingdom) Major Ritchie (New Zealand) Anthony Wilding	9–7, 5–7, 6–3, 2–6, 6–2
Loss	1912	Wimbledon	Grass	(France) André Gobert	(United Kingdom) Charles P. Dixon (United Kingdom) Herbert Roper-Barrett	6–3, 3–6, 4–6, 5–7

== World Championships finals ==
=== Singles (1 runner-up) ===
Result	Year	Championship	Surface	Opponent	Score
Loss	1919	World Covered Court Championships	Wood	(France) Andre Gobert	3–6, 2–6, 2–6

=== Doubles: (2 titles) ===
Result	Year	Championship	Surface	Partner	Opponents	Score
Win	1913	World Covered Court Championships	Wood	(France) Maurice Germot	(German Empire) Curt Bergmann (German Empire) Heinrich Kleinschroth	7–5, 2–6, 7–9, 6–3, 6–1
Win	1914	World Hard Court Championships	Clay	(France) Maurice Germot	(United Kingdom) Arthur Gore (United Kingdom) Algernon Kingscote	6–1, 11–9, 6–8, 6–2

=== Mixed doubles: (6 titles, 2 runner-ups) ===
Result	Year	Championship	Surface	Partner	Opponents	Score
Win	1912	World Hard Court Championships	Clay	(Belgium) Anne de Borman	(Germany) Heinrich Kleinschroth (Germany) Mieken Rieck	6–4, 7–5
Win	1913	World Hard Court Championships	Clay	(United States) Elizabeth Ryan	(New Zealand) Anthony Wilding (France) Germaine Golding	walkover
Win	1913	World Covered Court Championships	Wood	(France) Kate Fenwick	(Sweden) Gunnar Setterwall (Sweden) Sigrid Fick	7–5, 12–10
Win	1914	World Hard Court Championships	Clay	(United States) Elizabeth Ryan	(Austria) Ludwig von Salm-Hoogstraeten (France) Suzanne Lenglen	6–3, 6–1
Win	1919	World Covered Court Championships	Wood	(United Kingdom) Winifred Beamish	(France) William Laurentz (France) Germaine Golding	6–3, 6–3
Loss	1920	World Hard Court Championships	Clay	(France) Suzanne Amblard	(France) William Laurentz (France) Germaine Golding	walkover
Win	1921	World Hard Court Championships	Clay	(France) Suzanne Lenglen	(France) William Laurentz (France) Germaine Golding	6–3, 6–2
Loss	1922	World Covered Court Championships	Wood	(France) Jeanne Vaussard	(France) Jean Borotra (France) Germaine Golding	3–6, 4–6

== See also ==
- List of French Men's Singles champions and finalists
