= Jeanne Vaussard =

French tennis player

- Country (sports): France
- Born: 19 December 1891 Paris, France
- Died: 24 February 1977 (aged 85) Paris, France

Grand Slam singles results
- French Open: Loss (1924)

Jeanne Georgette Edmée Vaussard (19 December 1891 – 24 February 1977) was a French tennis player. She who competed in the Olympic Games in 1920 and 1924 and reached the finals of the French Championships in 1924, losing to her compatriot Julie Vlasto, in a version of the tournament that was till then open only to French nationals.

== World Championships finals ==
=== Doubles (1 title, 1 runner-up) ===
Result	Year	Championship	Surface	Partner	Opponents	Score
Win	1922	World Covered Court Championships	Wood	(France) Germaine Golding	(Switzerland) Canivet (France) Yvonne Bourgeois	walkover
Loss	1923	World Covered Court Championships	Wood	(France) Germaine Golding	(France) Geraldine Beamish (United Kingdom) Kathleen McKane	1–6, 1–6
