= Tennis at the 1920 Summer Olympics – Men's doubles =

Tennis at the Olympics

Men's doubles tennis at the Games of the VII Olympiad
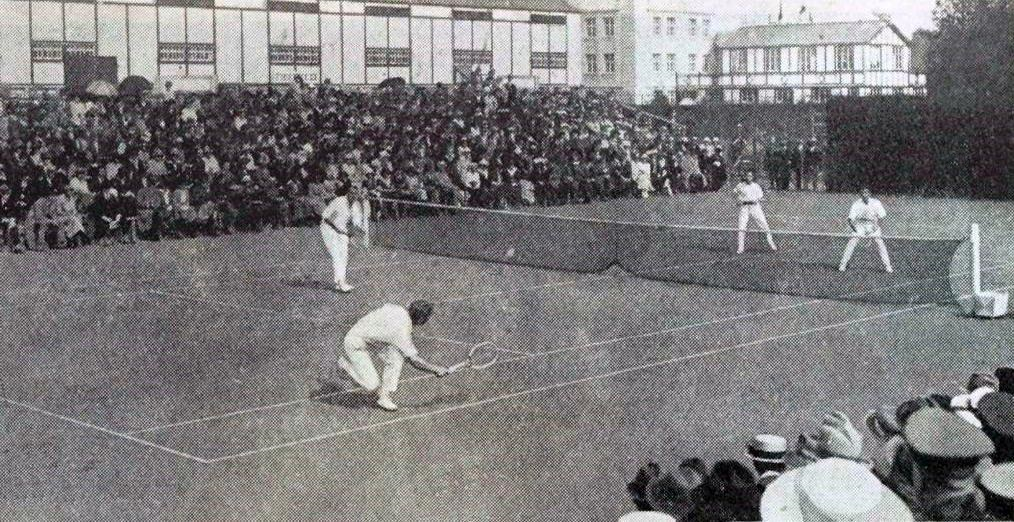
- Tennis at the 1920 Olympics
- Venue: Beerschot Tennis Club
- Dates: 16–24 August 1920
- Competitors: 22 teams (44 players) from 11 nations

Medalists
1st place, gold medalist(s)		Noel Turnbull; Max Woosnam; Great Britain
2nd place, silver medalist(s)		Seiichiro Kashio; Ichiya Kumagae; Japan
3rd place, bronze medalist(s)		Pierre Albarran; Max Decugis; France

Men's doubles
- Tennis at the 1920 Summer Olympics

Events
Singles	men	women
Doubles	men	women	mixed
← 1912 ·	Summer Olympics	· 1924 →

The men's doubles was a tennis event held as part of the Tennis at the 1920 Summer Olympics programme. It was the sixth appearance of the event. A total of 44 players (22 pairs) from 11 nations competed in the event, which was held from 16 to 24 August 1920 at the Beerschot Tennis Club. Nations were limited to four pairs (eight players) each. The event was won by Noel Turnbull and Max Woosnam of Great Britain, defeating Seiichiro Kashio and Ichiya Kumagae of Japan in the final. It was Great Britain's third victory in the men's doubles, most of any nation. Japan's silver came in its debut in the event. France earned its second consecutive bronze medal as Pierre Albarran and Max Decugis had a walkover in what would have been an all-France bronze-medal match.

== Background ==
This was the sixth appearance of men's doubles tennis. The event has been held at every Summer Olympics where tennis has been on the program: from 1896 to 1924 and then from 1988 to the current program. A demonstration event was held in 1968.

As in previous Games, the field for this event was relatively weak and without top competitors. The Olympic tennis tournament was no longer scheduled adjacent to or concurrent with Wimbledon, as it had been in 1908 and 1912; however, it was at the same time as the U.S. Championship this year. Bill Tilden and Bill Johnston, and all the other American players, thus did not enter.

Belgium, Italy, Japan, Spain, and Switzerland each made their debut in the event. Great Britain made its fourth appearance in the event, tying the absent Germany for most among nations.

== Competition format ==
The competition was a single-elimination tournament with a bronze-medal match. All matches were best-of-five sets. Tiebreaks had not been invented yet.

== Schedule ==
Date	Time	Round
Monday, 16 August 1920		Round of 32
Tuesday, 17 August 1920		Round of 32; Round of 16
Wednesday, 18 August 1920		Round of 16
Thursday, 19 August 1920; Friday, 20 August 1920; Saturday, 21 August 1920; Sunday, 22 August 1920; Monday, 23 August 1920		Quarterfinals; Semifinals; Bronze medal match
Tuesday, 24 August 1920		Final

== Draw ==
=== Key ===
- Q = Qualifier
- WC = Wild card
- LL = Lucky loser
- Alt = Alternate
- ITF = ITF entry
- PR = Protected ranking
- SR = Special ranking
- SE = Special exempt
- JE = Junior exempt
- JR = Junior Accelerator Programme entrant
- CO = College Accelerator Programme entrant
- NG = Next Gen Accelerator Program entrant
- w/o = Walkover
- r = Retired
- d = Defaulted

=== Finals ===
Semifinals
François Blanchy (FRA); Jacques Brugnon (FRA)	4	6	3	1
Seiichiro Kashio (JPN); Ichiya Kumagae (JPN)	6	4	6	6
Pierre Albarran (FRA); Max Decugis (FRA)	6	4	3	8
Noel Turnbull (GBR); Max Woosnam (GBR)	4	6	6	10

Final (gold-medal match)
Seiichiro Kashio (JPN); Ichiya Kumagae (JPN)	2	7	5	5
Noel Turnbull (GBR); Max Woosnam (GBR)	6	5	7	7
Bronze-medal match
François Blanchy (FRA); Jacques Brugnon (FRA)	w/o
Pierre Albarran (FRA); Max Decugis (FRA)

=== Top half ===
First round
C Langaard (NOR); J Nielsen (NOR)
A Chiesa (SUI); J Scholler (SUI)	w/o
A Lammens (BEL); J Washer (BEL)	6	6	6
S Malmström (SWE); C-E von Braun (SWE)	2	4	3
S Kashio (JPN); I Kumagae (JPN)
A Bonacossa (ITA); A Suzzi (ITA)	w/o
K Ardelt (TCH); L Žemla (TCH)	6	6	6
A Laloux (BEL); R Laloux (BEL)	2	4	4
B Norton (RSA); L Raymond (RSA)	6	7	6
JM Alonso Areyzaga (ESP); M Alonso Areyzaga (ESP)	3	5	0

Second round
F Blanchy (FRA); J Brugnon (FRA)	6	6	6
B Hykš (TCH); J Just (TCH)	1	2	4
O Andersson (SWE); H Müller (SWE)	1	8	1	4
C Langaard (NOR); J Nielsen (NOR)	6	6	6	6
A Lammens (BEL); J Washer (BEL)	1	4	4
S Kashio (JPN); I Kumagae (JPN)	6	6	6
K Ardelt (TCH); L Žemla (TCH)	1	6	6
B Norton (RSA); L Raymond (RSA)	6	8	8

Quarterfinals
F Blanchy (FRA); J Brugnon (FRA)	6	6	6
C Langaard (NOR); J Nielsen (NOR)	1	1	3
S Kashio (JPN); I Kumagae (JPN)	6	6	4	6
B Norton (RSA); L Raymond (RSA)	3	2	6	3

Semifinals
F Blanchy (FRA); J Brugnon (FRA)	4	6	3	1
S Kashio (JPN); I Kumagae (JPN)	6	4	6	6

=== Bottom half ===
First round
D Lawton (FRA); J-P Samazeuilh (FRA)	6	6	6
R Grisar (BEL); M van den Bemden (BEL)	4	2	3
C Blackbeard (RSA); G Dodd (RSA)	6	10	6
A Beamish (GBR); G Lowe (GBR)	1	8	3
J.M. Fernández (ESP); E de Satrústegui (ESP)	7	6	1	6
V de Laveleye (BEL); S Halot (BEL)	5	3	6	4
P Albarran (FRA); M Decugis (FRA)
J Bures (TCH); J Popelka (TCH)	w/o
F Týř (TCH); O Woffek (TCH)
G Patterson (AUS); R Thomas (AUS)	w/o

Second round
D Lawton (FRA); J-P Samazeuilh (FRA)	3	0	7
C Blackbeard (RSA); G Dodd (RSA)	6	6	7
J.M. Fernández (ESP); E de Satrústegui (ESP)	2	6	3	4
P Albarran (FRA); M Decugis (FRA)	6	3	6	6
F Týř (TCH); O Woffek (TCH)	1	2	3
N Turnbull (GBR); M Woosnam (GBR)	6	6	6
M Balbi di Robecco (ITA); C Colombo (ITA)	6	7	3	6
A Simon (SUI); H Syz (SUI)	3	5	6	4

Quarterfinals
C Blackbeard (RSA); G Dodd (RSA)	6	4	4	5
P Albarran (FRA); M Decugis (FRA)	3	6	6	7
N Turnbull (GBR); M Woosnam (GBR)	6	6	6	6
M Balbi di Robecco (ITA); C Colombo (ITA)	2	8	1	3

Semifinals
P Albarran (FRA); M Decugis (FRA)	6	4	3	8
N Turnbull (GBR); M Woosnam (GBR)	4	6	6	10

== Sources ==
- Belgium Olympic Committee (1957). Olympic Games Antwerp 1920: Official Report (in French).
- Wudarski, Pawel (1999). "Wyniki Igrzysk Olimpijskich" (in Polish).
- ITF, 2008 Olympic Tennis Event Media Guide
