= 1920 Wimbledon Championships – Men's doubles =

Men's doubles
- 1920 Wimbledon Championships

Final
- Champions: (United States) Chuck Garland (United States) R. Norris Williams
- Runners-up: (United Kingdom) Algernon Kingscote (United Kingdom) James Cecil Parke
- Score: 4–6, 6–4, 7–5, 6–2

Details
- Draw: 53
- Seeds: –

Events
Singles	men	women		boys	girls
Doubles	men	women	mixed	boys	girls
- Wimbledon Championships

Chuck Garland and R. Norris Williams defeated Algernon Kingscote and James Cecil Parke in the final, 4–6, 6–4, 7–5, 6–2 to win the gentlemen's doubles tennis title at the 1920 Wimbledon Championships. The reigning champions Pat O'Hara Wood and Ronald Thomas did not defend their title.

== Draw ==
Key

- Q = Qualifier
- WC = Wild card
- LL = Lucky loser
- Alt = Alternate
- ITF = ITF entry
- PR = Protected ranking
- SR = Special ranking
- SE = Special exempt
- JE = Junior exempt
- JR = Junior Accelerator Programme entrant
- CO = College Accelerator Programme entrant
- NG = Next Gen Accelerator Program entrant
- w/o = Walkover
- r = Retired
- d = Defaulted

=== Finals ===
Quarterfinals
(United States) Chuck Garland (United States) R. Norris Williams	6	7	6
(United Kingdom) Arthur Lowe (United Kingdom) Gordon Lowe	3	5	1
(United States) Bill Johnston (United States) Bill Tilden	6	7	6
(Australia) Stanley Doust (United Kingdom) Albert Prebble	2	5	4
(United Kingdom) Algernon Kingscote (United Kingdom) James Cecil Parke	6	4	6	4	7
(South Africa) Cecil Blackbeard (South Africa) George Dodd	3	6	3	6	5
(United Kingdom) Alfred Ingram (United Kingdom) Leonard Lyle	5	2	4
(United Kingdom) Percival Davson (United Kingdom) Theodore Mavrogordato	7	6	6

Semifinals
(United States) Chuck Garland (United States) R. Norris Williams	4	6	6	4	6
(United States) Bill Johnston (United States) Bill Tilden	6	4	3	6	2
(United Kingdom) Algernon Kingscote (United Kingdom) James Cecil Parke	6	6	6
(United Kingdom) Percival Davson (United Kingdom) Theodore Mavrogordato	4	4	1

Final
(United States) Chuck Garland (United States) R. Norris Williams	4	6	7	6
(United Kingdom) Algernon Kingscote (United Kingdom) James Cecil Parke	6	4	5	2

=== Top half ===
==== Section 1 ====
First round
(United Kingdom) HJ Gilbert (United Kingdom) MRL White	6	7	4	1	3
(Canada) Henry Mayes (Greece) Augustos Zerlendis	3	5	6	6	6
(United Kingdom) JA Frost (Beiyang government) Wei Wing Lock	1	2	1
(United States) Axel Gravem (United Kingdom) Fred Lindemann	6	6	6
(United Kingdom) Arthur Lowe (United Kingdom) Gordon Lowe	6	6	7
(United Kingdom) Vincent Burr (United Kingdom) BW Vane Percy	2	2	5

Second round
(United Kingdom) D Ingram (United Kingdom) Bill Swinden	w/o
(United Kingdom) HM Morris (United Kingdom) Charles Simond
(United Kingdom) Walter Crawley (United States) Samuel Hardy	3	4	0
(United States) Chuck Garland (United States) R. Norris Williams	6	6	6
(United Kingdom) Beverley Covell (United Kingdom) JG Hogan
(Canada) H Mayes (Greece) A Zerlendis	w/o
(United States) A Gravem (United Kingdom) F Lindemann	4	0	0
(United Kingdom) A Lowe (United Kingdom) G Lowe	6	6	6

Third round
HM Morris (United Kingdom) C Simond	3	3	2
(United States) C Garland (United States) RN Williams	6	6	6
(United Kingdom) B Covell (United Kingdom) JG Hogan	1	4	3
(United Kingdom) A Lowe (United Kingdom) G Lowe	6	6	6

Quarterfinals
(United States) C Garland (United States) RN Williams	6	7	6
(United Kingdom) A Lowe (United Kingdom) G Lowe	3	5	1

==== Section 2 ====
First round
(United States) Bill Johnston (United States) Bill Tilden	6	6	6
(United Kingdom) Maurice Blythman (United Kingdom) PE Harrison	4	1	1
(Netherlands) Christiaan van Lennep (Netherlands) Gerard Scheurleer	w/o
(France) André Gobert (France) William Laurentz
(United Kingdom) Charles Dixon (Romania) Nicolae Mișu	7	6	4	2	1
(South Africa) Louis Raymond (South Africa) Charles Winslow	5	4	6	6	6
(United Kingdom) Louis Greig (United Kingdom) St John Pym	4	3	8
(United Kingdom) Ambrose Dudley (United Kingdom) A. Wallis Myers	6	6	10
CF Sanderson (United Kingdom) Neville Willford	1	2	1
(United Kingdom) Alfred Beamish (United Kingdom) GTC Watt	6	6	6
(United Kingdom) RS Barnes (United Kingdom) Roderick McNair	1	2	6	3
(United States) Arthur Lovibond (United Kingdom) Monty Temple	6	6	4	6
PJ Baird (United Kingdom) Stanley Franklin	3	5	7	6	6
(United Kingdom) N Field (United Kingdom) Dan Hanbury	6	7	5	3	4
(United Kingdom) Percy Portlock (United Kingdom) JB Ward	1	1	6	4
(Australia) Stanley Doust (United Kingdom) Albert Prebble	6	6	4	6

Second round
(United States) W Johnston (United States) W Tilden	6	6	4	9
(France) A Gobert (France) W Laurentz	2	0	6	7
(South Africa) L Raymond (South Africa) C Winslow	6	6	6
(United Kingdom) A Dudley (United Kingdom) AW Myers	3	0	2
(United Kingdom) A Beamish (United Kingdom) GTC Watt	2	6	6	9
(United Kingdom) A Lovibond (United Kingdom) M Temple	6	2	4	7
(United Kingdom) PJ Baird (United Kingdom) S Franklin	0	0	1
(Australia) S Doust (United Kingdom) A Prebble	6	6	6

Third round
(United States) W Johnston (United States) W Tilden	6	6	6
(South Africa) L Raymond (South Africa) C Winslow	2	4	2
(United Kingdom) A Beamish (United Kingdom) GTC Watt	1	3	4
(Australia) S Doust (United Kingdom) A Prebble	6	6	6

Quarterfinals
(United States) W Johnston (United States) W Tilden	6	7	6
(Australia) S Doust (United Kingdom) A Prebble	2	5	4

The nationalities of CF Sanderson and PJ Baird are unknown.

=== Bottom half ===
==== Section 3 ====
First round
(New Zealand) Frank Fisher (Australia) Randolph Lycett	6	6	6
(United Kingdom) JT Baines (India) Sirdar Dass	0	2	0
(United Kingdom) Herbert Roper Barrett (United Kingdom) Major Ritchie	2	6	1
(United Kingdom) Algernon Kingscote (United Kingdom) James Cecil Parke	6	8	6
(South Africa) SD Brokenshaw (South Africa) E Coutts	w/o
(United Kingdom) CW Murray (United Kingdom) George Thomas
(Sweden) Carl-Erik von Braun (Sweden) Sune Malmström	6	3	6	7	6
(South Africa) PM Dixon (United Kingdom) JCF Simpson	2	6	4	9	3
(United Kingdom) Jack Hillyard (United Kingdom) Noel Turnbull	6	6	6
(United Kingdom) Alfred Hunter (United Kingdom) George Stoddart	4	2	4
(Australia) BE Henty (United Kingdom) John Cecil Masterman	4	4	1
(France) Jacques Brugnon (France) Max Decugis	6	6	6
(South Africa) Cecil Blackbeard (South Africa) George Dodd
(United Kingdom) EB Milner (United Kingdom) Frank Wallers	w/o
(United Kingdom) Alex Drew (United Kingdom) Leslie Godfree	2	8	10	4	6
(United Kingdom) Hamilton Price (Japan) Zenzo Shimizu	6	6	8	6	3

Second round
(New Zealand) F Fisher (Australia) R Lycett	1	1	3
(United Kingdom) A Kingscote (United Kingdom) JC Parke	6	6	6
(United Kingdom) CW Murray (United Kingdom) G Thomas	6	3	6	1
(Sweden) S Malmström (Sweden) C-E von Braun	3	6	8	6
(United Kingdom) J Hillyard (United Kingdom) N Turnbull	9	4	4
(France) J Brugnon (France) M Decugis	11	6	6
(South Africa) C Blackbeard (South Africa) G Dodd	6	6	12
(United Kingdom) A Drew (United Kingdom) L Godfree	4	1	10

Third round
(United Kingdom) A Kingscote (United Kingdom) JC Parke	6	6	6
(Sweden) S Malmström (Sweden) C-E von Braun	4	0	2
(France) J Brugnon (France) M Decugis	7	3	3	3
(South Africa) C Blackbeard (South Africa) G Dodd	5	6	6	6

Quarterfinals
(United Kingdom) A Kingscote (United Kingdom) JC Parke	6	4	6	4	7
(South Africa) C Blackbeard (South Africa) G Dodd	3	6	3	6	5

==== Section 4 ====
First round
(United Kingdom) JM Bell (United Kingdom) Hew Stoker	4	6	4	6	3
(United Kingdom) LF Davin (United Kingdom) Ernest Lamb	6	4	6	1	6
(South Africa) Brian Norton (South Africa) Gerald Sherwell	6	6	6
(United Kingdom) Scotter Owen (United Kingdom) Francis Stowe	3	2	4

Second round
(United Kingdom) LF Davin (United Kingdom) E Lamb	4	4	6	6
(South Africa) B Norton (South Africa) G Sherwell	6	6	3	8
(United Kingdom) AW Davson (United Kingdom) Ulysses Williams	3	0	6	4
(United Kingdom) Alfred Ingram (United Kingdom) Leonard Lyle	6	6	4	6
(France) André Roche (Greece) S Vlasto	2	2	5
(France) Alain Gerbault (Denmark) Erik Tegner	6	6	7
(United Kingdom) Percival Davson (United Kingdom) Theodore Mavrogordato	6	6	6
(United Kingdom) Maurice Day (United Kingdom) T Moss	2	2	1

Third round
(South Africa) B Norton (South Africa) G Sherwell	4	2	1
(United Kingdom) A Ingram (United Kingdom) L Lyle	6	6	6
(France) A Gerbault (Denmark) E Tegner	1	0	0
(United Kingdom) P Davson (United Kingdom) T Mavrogordato	6	6	6

Quarterfinals
(United Kingdom) A Ingram (United Kingdom) L Lyle	5	2	4
(United Kingdom) P Davson (United Kingdom) T Mavrogordato	7	6	6
