= Japan at the 1920 Summer Olympics =

- IOC code: JPN
- NOC: Japanese Olympic Committee

in Antwerp
- Competitors: 15 in 4 sports
- Flag bearer: Gensabulo Noguchi
- Medals Ranked 17th: Gold 0 Silver 2 Bronze 0 Total 2

Summer Olympics appearances (overview)
- 1912; 1920; 1924; 1928; 1932; 1936; 1948; 1952; 1956; 1960; 1964; 1968; 1972; 1976; 1980; 1984; 1988; 1992; 1996; 2000; 2004; 2008; 2012; 2016; 2020; 2024

The Empire of Japan competed at the 1920 Summer Olympics in Antwerp, Belgium.

== Background ==
Following Japan's poor showing during its Olympic debut at the 1912 Summer Olympics in Stockholm, Sweden, Japan planned for increased participation and the discipline of its athletes in the 1916 Summer Olympics planned for Berlin, Germany (which was subsequently cancelled by World War I. Japan also expanded its participation in international sporting events, by competing in the Far Eastern Games held in Manila in 1913, Shanghai in 1915, Tokyo in 1917 and Manila in 1919. By the time of the 1920 Olympics, Japan was able to field a fifteen-man team. Although most of its track-and-field runners and swimmers failed to pass the initial heats, Japan did considerably better in tennis, securing its first Olympic medals. However, the Japan Amateur Athletic Association, which sponsored the team, grossly underestimated the costs of journey, and was unable to pay for the team's return from Belgium. Local representatives of the Mitsubishi and Mitsui zaibatsu agreed to pay the $15,000 necessary for the stranded team to come home, but the embarrassment was so great that the Japanese government agreed to provide subsidies for future Olympic participation.

== Medalists ==
Medal	Name	Sport	Event	Date
Silver	Ichiya Kumagae	Tennis	Men's singles	August 23
Silver	Seiichiro Kashio; Ichiya Kumagae	Tennis	Men's doubles	August 23

Medals by sport
Sport	1st place, gold medalist(s)	2nd place, silver medalist(s)	3rd place, bronze medalist(s)	Total
Tennis	0	2	0	3
Total	0	2	0	2

== Aquatics ==
=== Diving ===
A single diver represented Japan in 1920. It was the nation's debut in the sport. Masayoshi Uchida was unable to advance past the first round of the plain high diving competition.

Men

Ranks given are within the semifinal group.

Diver	Event	Semifinals			Final		
Diver	Event	Points	Score	Rank	Points	Score	Rank
Masayoshi Uchida	Plain high dive	40	94.0	8	did not advance		

=== Swimming ===
Two swimmers, both men, represented Japan in 1920. It was the nation's debut in the sport. Neither of the swimmers advanced to the finals.

Ranks given are within the heat.

Men

Swimmer	Event	Quarterfinals		Semifinals		Final	
Swimmer	Event	Result	Rank	Result	Rank	Result	Rank
Kenkichi Saito	100 m free	Unknown	6	did not advance			
Kenkichi Saito	400 m free	6:16.8	2 Q	did not finish			
Masayoshi Uchida	100 m free	Unknown	5	did not advance			
Masayoshi Uchida	400 m free	6:40.0	3	did not advance			

== Athletics ==
11 athletes represented Japan in 1920. It was the nation's second appearance in athletics, having competed in the sport both times Japan had appeared at the Olympics. Japan continued to seek its first medals in the sport unsuccessfully, with a 12th-place finish in the decathlon the best result of the Games for Japanese athletes.

Ranks given are within the heat.

Athlete	Event	Heats		Quarterfinals		Semifinals		Final	
Athlete	Event	Result	Rank	Result	Rank	Result	Rank	Result	Rank
Saburo Hasumi	800 m	N/A		2:02.2	6	did not advance			
Saburo Hasumi	1500 m	N/A					6	did not advance	
Ichiro Kaga	100 m		5	did not advance					
Ichiro Kaga	200 m		4	did not advance					
Shizo Kanakuri	Marathon	N/A						2:48:45.4	16
Hiroshi Masuda	Pentathlon	N/A						did not finish	
Yahei Miura	Marathon	N/A						2:59:37.0	24
Zensaku Motegi	10000 m	N/A					12	did not advance	
Zensaku Motegi	Marathon	N/A						2:51:09.4	20
Gensabulo Noguchi	Decathlon	N/A						3668.630	12
Tomeichi Oura	5000 m	N/A					6	did not advance	
Kunosuke Sano	5000 m	N/A					7	did not advance	
Kunosuke Sano	10000 m	N/A					8	did not advance	
Shinichi Yamaoka	100 m	11.6	4	did not advance					
Shinichi Yamaoka	200 m	23.9	4	did not advance					
Kenzo Yashima	Marathon	N/A						2:57:02.0	21

== Tennis ==
Two tennis players, both men, competed for Japan in 1920. It was the nation's debut in the sport. Kumagae took the men's singles silver medal, and the pair also took silver in the men's doubles. The two would have faced each other in the quarterfinals of the singles tournament had Kashio advanced that far, so could not have won any more than the two medals they did win.

Player	Event	Round of 64	Round of 32	Round of 16	Quarterfinals	Semifinals	Finals	Rank
Player	Event	Opposition Score	Opposition Score	Opposition Score	Opposition Score	Opposition Score	Opposition Score	Rank
Seiichiro Kashio	Men's singles	Bye	Tegner (DEN); W 6–3, 6–1, 6–2	Dodd (RSA); L 6–3, 4–6, 6–2, 3–6, 6–1	did not advance			9
Ichiya Kumagae	Men's singles	Alonso (ESP); W 7–5, 6–3, 6–3	de Laveleye (BEL); W 6–0, 6–1, 6–0	Lammens (BEL); W 7–5, 6–1, 6–4	Dodd (RSA); W 7–5, 6–1, 6–1	Winslow (RSA); W 6–2, 6–2, 6–2	Raymond (RSA); L 5–7, 6–4, 7–5, 6–4	2nd place, silver medalist(s)
Seiichiro Kashio; Ichiya Kumagae	Men's doubles	N/A	Bye	Lammens & Washer (BEL); W 6–1, 6–4, 6–4	Norton & Raymond (RSA); W 6–3, 6–2, 4–6, 6–3	Blanchy & Brugnon (FRA); W 6–4, 4–6, 6–3, 6–1	Turnbull & Woosnam (GBR); L 6–2, 5–7, 7–5, 7–5	2nd place, silver medalist(s)

Opponent nation	Wins	Losses	Percent
Belgium	3	0	1.000
Denmark	1	0	1.000
France	1	0	1.000
Great Britain	0	1	.000
South Africa	3	2	.600
Spain	1	0	1.000
Total	9	3	.750

Round	Wins	Losses	Percent
Round of 64	1	0	1.000
Round of 32	2	0	1.000
Round of 16	2	1	.667
Quarterfinals	2	0	1.000
Semifinals	2	0	1.000
Final	0	2	.000
Bronze match	0	0	–
Total	9	3	.750
