= Tennis at the 1920 Summer Olympics – Men's singles =

Tennis at the Olympics

Men's singles tennis at the Games of the VII Olympiad
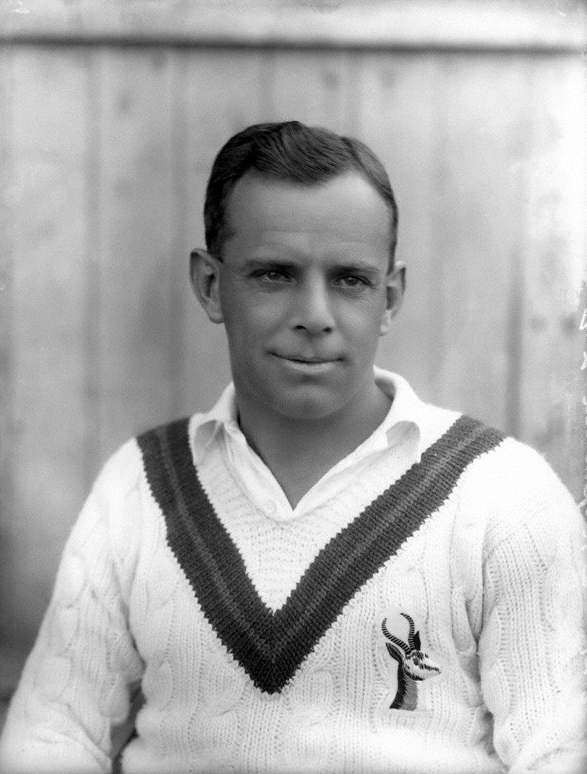
- Louis Raymond (1929)
- Venue: Beerschot Tennis Club
- Dates: 16–23 August 1920
- Competitors: 41 from 14 nations

Medalists
1st place, gold medalist(s)		Louis Raymond	South Africa
2nd place, silver medalist(s)		Ichiya Kumagae	Japan
3rd place, bronze medalist(s)		Charles Winslow	South Africa

Men's singles
- Tennis at the 1920 Summer Olympics

Events
Singles	men	women
Doubles	men	women	mixed
← 1912 ·	Summer Olympics	· 1924 →

The men's singles was a tennis event held as part of the tennis at the 1920 Summer Olympics programme. It was the sixth appearance of the event. A total of 44 players from 15 nations entered in the event; 41 players from 14 nations competed. The event was held from 16 to 23 August 1920 at the Beerschot Tennis Club. Nations were limited to four players each. The event was won by Louis Raymond of South Africa, the nation's second consecutive in the event (second-most all-time behind Great Britain's three). South Africa had nearly had both finalists again, as it had in 1912, but defending champion Charles Winslow fell to Japan's Ichiya Kumagae in the semifinal; Winslow took bronze by walkover against Noel Turnbull of Great Britain. Kumagae's silver was Japan's first medal in the event.

== Background ==
This was the sixth appearance of the men's singles tennis event. The event has been held at every Summer Olympics where tennis has been on the program: from 1896 to 1924 and then from 1988 to the current program. Demonstration events were held in 1968 and 1984.

As in previous Games, the field for this event was relatively weak and without top competitors. The Olympic tennis tournament was no longer scheduled adjacent to or concurrent with Wimbledon, as it had been in 1908 and 1912; however, it was at the same time as the U.S. Championship this year. Bill Tilden and Bill Johnston, and all the other American players, thus did not enter. Australia's Gerald Patterson did enter, but withdrew.

Belgium, Czechoslovakia, Italy, Japan, Spain, and Switzerland each made their debut in the event. France made its fifth appearance, most among all nations, having missed only the St. Louis 1904 event.

== Competition format ==
The competition was a single-elimination tournament with a bronze-medal match. All matches were best-of-five sets.

== Schedule ==
Date	Time	Round
Monday, 16 August 1920		Round of 64; Round of 32
Tuesday, 17 August 1920		Round of 32
Wednesday, 18 August 1920		Round of 32; Round of 16
Thursday, 19 August 1920		Round of 16
Friday, 20 August 1920		Round of 16
Saturday, 21 August 1920		Quarterfinals
Sunday, 22 August 1920		Semifinals
Monday, 23 August 1920		Bronze medal match Final

== Draw ==
=== Key ===
- Q = Qualifier
- WC = Wild card
- LL = Lucky loser
- Alt = Alternate
- ITF = ITF entry
- PR = Protected ranking
- SR = Special ranking
- SE = Special exempt
- JE = Junior exempt
- JR = Junior Accelerator Programme entrant
- CO = College Accelerator Programme entrant
- NG = Next Gen Accelerator Program entrant
- w/o = Walkover
- r = Retired
- d = Defaulted

=== Finals ===
Quarterfinals
Sune Malmström (SWE)	3	1	1
Louis Raymond (RSA)	6	6	6
Noel Turnbull (GBR)	0	7	4	6	7
Manuel Alonso Areyzaga (ESP)	6	5	6	3	5
Ichiya Kumagae (JPN)	7	6	6
George Dodd (RSA)	5	1	1
Gordon Lowe (GBR)	4	6	4	6	2
Charles Winslow (RSA)	6	3	6	4	6

Semifinals
Louis Raymond (RSA)	2	1	6	6	6
Noel Turnbull (GBR)	6	6	2	2	1
Ichiya Kumagae (JPN)	6	6	6
Charles Winslow (RSA)	2	2	2

Final (gold-medal match)
Louis Raymond (RSA)	5	6	7	6
Ichiya Kumagae (JPN)	7	4	5	4
Bronze-medal match
Noel Turnbull (GBR)	w/o
Charles Winslow (RSA)

=== Top half ===
==== Section 1 ====
First round

Second round
A Simon (SUI)	3	8	6	6	6
E de Satrústegui (ESP)	6	6	2	8	2
S Malmström (SWE)	4	6	6	7
L Žemla (TCH)	6	2	3	5
L Raymond (RSA)	7	6	4	6
M van den Bemden (BEL)	5	1	6	1
J Brugnon (FRA)	6	7	6
A Chiesa (SUI)	4	5	4

Third round
A Simon (SUI)	2	2	0
S Malmström (SWE)	6	6	6
L Raymond (RSA)	3	6	6	6
J Brugnon (FRA)	6	2	0	1

Quarterfinals
S Malmström (SWE)	3	1	1
L Raymond (RSA)	6	6	6

==== Section 2 ====
First round
J.M. Fernández (ESP)	0	6	6	6
F Lindqvist (SWE)	6	2	3	2
M Balbi Di Robecco (ITA)
G Patterson (AUS)	w/o
K Ardelt (TCH)
L Nypels (NED)	w/o
A Beamish (GBR)	6	6	6
O Woffek (TCH)	1	3	4
M Alonso Areyzaga (ESP)	6	2	6	6
J Just (TCH)	3	6	0	2
M Woosnam (GBR)	3	6	6	6
H Müller (SWE)	6	1	3	3

Second round
N Turnbull (GBR)
J Scholler (SUI)	w/o
J.M. Fernández (ESP)	2	4	1
M Balbi Di Robecco (ITA)	6	6	6
K Ardelt (TCH)	2	4	3
A Beamish (GBR)	6	6	6
M Alonso Areyzaga (ESP)	6	2	6	6
M Woosnam (GBR)	1	6	1	3

Third round
N Turnbull (GBR)	3	6	6	6	6
M Balbi Di Robecco (ITA)	6	3	0	8	2
A Beamish (GBR)	1	7	7	3	1
M Alonso Areyzaga (ESP)	6	5	5	6	6

Quarterfinals
N Turnbull (GBR)	0	7	4	6	7
M Alonso Areyzaga (ESP)	6	5	6	3	5

=== Bottom half ===
==== Section 3 ====
First round
C-E von Braun (SWE)	4	6	7	6
A Bonacossa (ITA)	6	1	5	2
A Lammens (BEL)	6	6	3	7
H Syz (SUI)	3	4	6	5
I Kumagae (JPN)	7	6	6
JM Alonso Areyzaga (ESP)	5	3	3
V de Laveleye (BEL)	6	2	6	6
C Langaard (NOR)	2	6	3	3
M Decugis (FRA)	6	12	2	8
B Norton (RSA)	4	10	6	6
G Dodd (RSA)	2	6	6	9
F Blanchy (FRA)	6	2	1	7

Second round
C-E von Braun (SWE)	2	1	1
A Lammens (BEL)	6	6	6
I Kumagae (JPN)	6	6	6
V de Laveleye (BEL)	0	1	0
M Decugis (FRA)	2	1	1
G Dodd (RSA)	6	6	6
E Tegner (DEN)	3	1	2
S Kashio (JPN)	6	6	6

Third round
A Lammens (BEL)	5	1	4
I Kumagae (JPN)	7	6	6
G Dodd (RSA)	6	4	6	3	6
S Kashio (JPN)	3	6	2	6	1

Quarterfinals
I Kumagae (JPN)	7	6	6
G Dodd (RSA)	5	1	1

==== Section 4 ====
The match between Lowe and Zerlendis was played over two days, and lasted for nearly six hours. At one point the ballboys, bored by the long rallying, left the court and went to lunch, forcing the match to stop until they returned.

First round

Second round
A Zerlendis (GRE)	12	10	7	4	4
G Lowe (GBR)	14	8	5	6	6
J Nielsen (NOR)	2	3	1
C Colombo (ITA)	6	6	6
J-P Samazeuilh (FRA)	5	6	3	2
C Winslow (RSA)	7	2	6	6
R Thomas (AUS)	1	3	6	4
J Washer (BEL)	6	6	3	6

Third round
G Lowe (GBR)	6	6	2	7
C Colombo (ITA)	4	0	6	5
C Winslow (RSA)	8	6	6
J Washer (BEL)	6	4	1

Quarterfinals
G Lowe (GBR)	4	6	4	6	2
C Winslow (RSA)	6	3	6	4	6

== Results summary ==
Rank	Player	Nation	Round of 64	Round of 32	Round of 16	Quarterfinals	Semifinals	Final
1st place, gold medalist(s)	Louis Raymond	South Africa	Bye	M van den Bemden (BEL); W 7–5, 6–1, 4–6, 6–1	J Brugnon (FRA); W 3–6, 6–2, 6–0, 6–1	S Malmström (SWE); W 6–3, 6–1, 6–1	N Turnbull (GBR); W 2–6, 1–6, 6–2, 6–2, 6–1	I Kumagae (JPN); W 5–7, 6–4, 7–5, 6–4
2nd place, silver medalist(s)	Ichiya Kumagae	Japan	JM Alonso (ESP); W 7–5, 6–3, 6–3	V de Laveleye (BEL); W 6–0, 6–1, 6–0	A Lammens (BEL); W 7–5, 6–1, 6–4	G Dodd (RSA); W 7–5, 6–1, 6–1	C Winslow (RSA); W 6–2, 6–2, 6–2	L Raymond (RSA); L 5–7, 6–4, 7–5, 6–4
3rd place, bronze medalist(s)	Charles Winslow	South Africa	Bye	J-P Samazeuilh (FRA); W 7–5, 2–6, 6–3, 6–2	J Washer (BEL); W 8–6, 6–4, 6–1	G Lowe (GBR); W 6–4, 3–6, 6–4, 4–6, 6–2	I Kumagae (JPN); L 6–2, 6–2, 6–2	N Turnbull (GBR); W w/o
4	Noel Turnbull	Great Britain	Bye	J Scholler (SUI); W w/o	M Balbi Di Robecco (ITA); W 3–6, 6–3, 6–0, 6–8, 6–2	M Alonso Areyzaga (ESP); W 0–6, 7–5, 4–6, 6–3, 7–5	L Raymond (RSA); L 2–6, 1–6, 6–2, 6–2, 6–1	C Winslow (RSA); L w/o
5	Manuel Alonso Areizaga	Spain	J Just (TCH); W 6–3, 2–6, 6–0, 6–2	M Woosnam (GBR); W 6–1, 2–6, 6–1, 6–3	A Beamish (GBR); W 6–1, 5–7, 5–7, 6–3, 6–1	N Turnbull (GBR); L 0–6, 7–5, 4–6, 6–3, 7–5	did not advance	
5	George Dodd	South Africa	F Blanchy (FRA); W 2–6, 6–2, 6–1, 9–7	M Decugis (FRA); W 6–2, 6–1, 6–1	S Kashio (JPN); W 6–3, 4–6, 6–2, 3–6, 6–1	I Kumagae (JPN); L 7–5, 6–1, 6–1	did not advance	
5	Gordon Lowe	Great Britain	Bye	A Zerlendis (GRE); W 14–12, 8–10, 5–7, 6–4, 6–4	C Colombo (ITA); W 6–4, 6–0, 2–6, 7–5	C Winslow (RSA); L 6–4, 3–6, 6–4, 4–6, 6–2	did not advance	
5	Sune Malmström	Sweden	Bye	L Žemla (TCH); W 4–6, 6–2, 6–3, 7–5	A Simon (SUI); W 6–2, 6–2, 6–0	L Raymond (RSA); L 6–3, 6–1, 6–1	did not advance	
9	Mino Balbi Di Robecco	Italy	G Patterson (AUS); W w/o	J.M. Fernández (ESP); W 6–2, 6–4, 6–1	N Turnbull (GBR); L 3–6, 6–3, 6–0, 6–8, 6–2	did not advance		
9	Alfred Beamish	Great Britain	O Woffek (TCH); W 6–1, 6–3, 6–4	K Ardelt (TCH); W 6–6, 6–4, 6–3	M Alonso Areizaga (ESP); L 6–1, 5–7, 5–7, 6–3, 6–1	did not advance		
9	Jacques Brugnon	France	Bye	A Chiesa (SUI); W 6–4, 7–5, 6–4	L Raymond (RSA); L 3–6, 6–2, 6–0, 6–1	did not advance		
9	Cesare Colombo	Italy	Bye	J Nielsen (NOR); W 6–2, 6–3, 6–1	G Lowe (GBR); L 6–4, 6–0, 2–6, 7–5	did not advance		
9	Seiichiro Kashio	Japan	Bye	E Tegner (DEN); W 6–3, 6–1, 6–2	G Dodd (RSA); L 6–3, 4–6, 6–2, 3–6, 6–1	did not advance		
9	Albert Lammens	Belgium	H Syz (SUI); W 6–3, 6–4, 3–6, 7–5	C-E von Braun (SWE); W 6–2, 6–1, 6–1	I Kumagae (JPN); L 7–5, 6–1, 6–4	did not advance		
9	Armand Simon	Switzerland	Bye	E de Satrústegui (ESP); W 3–6, 8–6, 6–2, 6–8, 6–2	S Malmström (SWE); L 6–2, 6–2, 6–0	did not advance		
9	Jean Washer	Belgium	Bye	R Thomas (AUS); W 6–1, 6–3, 3–6, 6–4	C Winslow (RSA); L 8–6, 6–4, 6–1	did not advance		
17	Karel Ardelt	Czechoslovakia	L Nypels (NED); W w/o	A Beamish (GBR); L 6–6, 6–4, 6–3	did not advance			
17	Maurice van den Bemden	Belgium	Bye	L Raymond (RSA); L 7–5, 6–1, 4–6, 6–1	did not advance			
17	Carl-Eric von Braun	Sweden	A Bonacossa (ITA); W 4–6, 6–1, 7–5, 6–2	A Lammens (BEL); L 6–2, 6–1, 6–1	did not advance			
17	Alberto Henri Chiesa	Switzerland	Bye	J Brugnon (FRA); L 6–4, 7–5, 6–4	did not advance			
17	Max Decugis	France	B Norton (RSA); W 6–4, 12–10, 2–6, 8–6	G Dodd (RSA); L 6–2, 6–1, 6–1	did not advance			
17	José Miguel Fernández de Liencres	Spain	F Lindqvist (SWE); W 0–6, 6–2, 6–3, 6–2	M Balbi Di Robecco (ITA); L 6–2, 6–4, 6–1	did not advance			
17	Victor de Laveleye	Belgium	C Langaard (NOR); W 6–2, 2–6, 6–3, 6–3	I Kumagae (JPN); L 6–0, 6–1, 6–0	did not advance			
17	Jack Nielsen	Norway	Bye	C Colombo (ITA); L 6–2, 6–3, 6–1	did not advance			
17	Jean-Pierre Samazeuilh	France	Bye	C Winslow (RSA); L 7–5, 2–6, 6–3, 6–2	did not advance			
17	Enrique de Satrústegui	Spain	Bye	A Simon (SUI); L 3–6, 8–6, 6–2, 6–8, 6–2	did not advance			
17	Erik Tegner	Denmark	Bye	S Kashio (JPN); L 6–3, 6–1, 6–2	did not advance			
17	Ronald Thomas	Australia	Bye	J Washer (BEL); L 6–1, 6–3, 3–6, 6–4	did not advance			
17	Max Woosnam	Great Britain	H Müller (SWE); W 3–6, 6–1, 6–3, 6–3	M Alonso Areizaga (ESP); L 6–1, 2–6, 6–1, 6–3	did not advance			
17	Ladislav Žemla	Czechoslovakia	Bye	S Malmström (SWE); L 4–6, 6–2, 6–3, 7–5	did not advance			
17	Augustos Zerlendis	Greece	Bye	G Lowe (GBR); L 14–12, 8–10, 5–7, 6–4, 6–4	did not advance			
32	José María Alonso	Spain	I Kumagae (JPN); L 7–5, 6–3, 6–3	did not advance				
32	François Blanchy	France	G Dodd (RSA); L 2–6, 6–2, 6–1, 9–7	did not advance				
32	Alberto Bonacossa	Italy	C-E von Braun (SWE); L 4–6, 6–1, 7–5, 6–2	did not advance				
32	Jaroslav Just	Czechoslovakia	M Alonso Areizaga (ESP); L 6–3, 2–6, 6–0, 6–2	did not advance				
32	Conrad Langaard	Norway	V de Laveleye (BEL); L 6–2, 2–6, 6–3, 6–3	did not advance				
32	Fritz Lindqvist	Sweden	J.M. Fernández (ESP); L 0–6, 6–2, 6–3, 6–2	did not advance				
32	Henning Müller	Sweden	M Woosnam (GBR); L 3–6, 6–1, 6–3, 6–3	did not advance				
32	Brian Norton	South Africa	M Decugis (FRA); L 6–4, 12–10, 2–6, 8–6	did not advance				
32	Hans Syz	Switzerland	A Lammens (BEL); L 6–3, 6–4, 3–6, 7–5	did not advance				
32	Otto Woffek	Czechoslovakia	A Beamish (GBR); L 6–1, 6–3, 6–4	did not advance				
—	Leopold Nypels	Netherlands	K Ardelt (TCH); L w/o	did not advance				
—	Gerald Patterson	Australia	M Balbi Di Robecco (ITA); L w/o	did not advance				
—	J. Scholler	Switzerland	Bye	N Turnbull (GBR); L w/o	did not advance			

== Sources ==
- Belgium Olympic Committee (1957). Olympic Games Antwerp 1920: Official Report (in French).
- Wudarski, Pawel (1999). "Wyniki Igrzysk Olimpijskich" (in Polish).
- ITF, 2008 Olympic Tennis Event Media Guide
