= 1920 Wimbledon Championships – Men's singles =

Men's singles
- 1920 Wimbledon Championships

Final
- Champion: (United States) Bill Tilden
- Runner-up: (Australia) Gerald Patterson
- Score: 2–6, 6–3, 6–2, 6–4

Details
- Draw: 128
- Seeds: –

Events
Singles	men	women		boys	girls
Doubles	men	women	mixed	boys	girls
- Wimbledon Championships

Bill Tilden defeated Zenzo Shimizu 6–4, 6–4, 13–11 in the All Comers' Final, and then defeated the reigning champion Gerald Patterson 2–6, 6–3, 6–2, 6–4 in the challenge round to win the gentlemen's singles tennis title at the 1920 Wimbledon Championships.

== Draw ==
Key

- Q = Qualifier
- WC = Wild card
- LL = Lucky loser
- Alt = Alternate
- ITF = ITF entry
- PR = Protected ranking
- SR = Special ranking
- SE = Special exempt
- JE = Junior exempt
- JR = Junior Accelerator Programme entrant
- CO = College Accelerator Programme entrant
- NG = Next Gen Accelerator Program entrant
- w/o = Walkover
- r = Retired
- d = Defaulted

=== Challenge round ===
Challenge Round
(United States) Bill Tilden	2	6	6	6
(Australia) Gerald Patterson	6	3	2	4

=== All-Comers' Finals ===
Quarterfinals
(United Kingdom) Theodore Mavrogordato	6	4	9	7
(United States) R. Norris Williams	3	6	7	5
(Japan) Zenzo Shimizu	6	6	6
(United Kingdom) Neville Willford	0	1	2
(United Kingdom) Randolph Lycett	5	6	4	5
(United States) Bill Tilden	7	4	6	7
(South Africa) Cecil Blackbeard	6	1	3	1
(United States) Chuck Garland	4	6	6	6

Semifinals
(United Kingdom) Theodore Mavrogordato	6	4	0	2
(Japan) Zenzo Shimizu	3	6	6	6
(United States) Bill Tilden	6	8	6
(United States) Chuck Garland	4	6	2

Final
(Japan) Zenzo Shimizu	4	4	11
(United States) Bill Tilden	6	6	13

=== Top half ===
==== Section 1 ====
First round
(United Kingdom) GTC Watt	0	2	1
(United Kingdom) Theodore Mavrogordato	6	6	6
(United Kingdom) Maurice Day	4	2	3
(New Zealand) Frank Fisher	6	6	6
(United Kingdom) Charles Dixon	9	6	8
(United Kingdom) TA Fuller	7	2	6
(United Kingdom) Brame Hillyard	0	1	4
(United Kingdom) Percival Davson	6	6	6
(United Kingdom) Alfred Hunter	6	7	3	6
(United Kingdom) Ernest Parton	3	5	6	1
(United Kingdom) Walter Crawley	4	3	4
(United Kingdom) Arthur Macpherson	6	6	6
(South Africa) Brian Norton	6	7	6
(United Kingdom) JCF Simpson	2	5	2
(United Kingdom) IS White	4	4	1
(United Kingdom) RH Hotham	6	6	6

Second round
(United Kingdom) T Mavrogordato	6	6	6
(New Zealand) F Fisher	4	2	3
(United Kingdom) C Dixon	3	2	7	0
(United Kingdom) P Davson	6	6	5	6
(United Kingdom) A Hunter	4	2	5
(United Kingdom) A Macpherson	6	6	7
(South Africa) B Norton	6	13	6
(United Kingdom) RH Hotham	2	11	2

Third round
(United Kingdom) T Mavrogordato	3	7	6	7
(United Kingdom) P Davson	6	5	3	5
(United Kingdom) A Macpherson	6	4	2	2
(South Africa) B Norton	4	6	6	6

Fourth round
(United Kingdom) T Mavrogordato	6	7	8
(South Africa) B Norton	1	5	6

==== Section 2 ====
First round
(Denmark) Erik Tegner	6	6	6
(United Kingdom) Monty Temple	4	2	0
(United Kingdom) JA Frost	3	4	2
(United States) Axel Gravem	6	6	6
(United States) R. Norris Williams	6	6	6
(United Kingdom) N Field	2	1	3
(United Kingdom) George Boustead
(United Kingdom) JW O'Farrell	w/o
(South Africa) Gerald Sherwell	7	2	4
(United Kingdom) Arthur Gore	9	6	6
(France) Jacques Brugnon	6	6	6	6
(United Kingdom) JT Baines	8	4	4	0
(Australia) BE Henty	3	4	3
(South Africa) Louis Raymond	6	6	6
(France) William Laurentz	6	6	6
(United Kingdom) LF Davin	2	3	1

Second round
(Denmark) E Tegner	7	6	3	4	5
(United States) A Gravem	5	2	6	6	7
(United States) RN Williams	6	6	6
(United Kingdom) G Boustead	2	2	1
(United Kingdom) A Gore	2	4	6	6	3
(France) J Brugnon	6	6	2	0	6
(South Africa) L Raymond	4	3	6	3
(France) W Laurentz	6	6	4	6

Third round
(United States) A Gravem	5	0	1
(United States) RN Williams	7	6	6
(France) J Brugnon	6	3	6	6
(France) W Laurentz	4	6	3	2

Fourth round
(United States) RN Williams	6	6	6
(France) J Brugnon	0	2	2

==== Section 3 ====
First round
(Beiyang government) Wei Wing Lock	3	6	8	2	6
(United Kingdom) Vincent Burr	6	4	6	6	4
(United Kingdom) CL Philcox	6	6	6
(France) André Roche	2	2	4
(United Kingdom) Beverley Covell	1	3	7	2
(Sweden) Sune Malmström	6	6	5	6
(United Kingdom) Leonard Lyle	4	3	3
(Greece) Augustos Zerlendis	6	6	6
(Netherlands) Christiaan van Lennep	w/o
(United Kingdom) Scotter Owen
(United Kingdom) Percy Portlock	1	2	5
(France) André Gobert	6	6	7
(United Kingdom) Philip Glover	w/o
(United Kingdom) Gordon Lowe
(United Kingdom) Arthur Belgrave	2	3	1
(Japan) Zenzo Shimizu	6	6	6

Second round
(Beiyang government) WL Wei	6	6	4	4	4
(United Kingdom) CL Philcox	3	4	6	6	6
(Sweden) S Malmström	3	1	4
(Greece) A Zerlendis	6	6	6
(United Kingdom) S Owen	1	2	3
(France) A Gobert	6	6	6
(United Kingdom) G Lowe	2	2	8	2
(Japan) Z Shimizu	6	6	6	6

Third round
(United Kingdom) CL Philcox	3	6	3	2
(Greece) A Zerlendis	6	2	6	6
(France) A Gobert	4	8	6	6	4
(Japan) Z Shimizu	6	10	4	2	6

Fourth round
(Greece) A Zerlendis	3	4	3
(Japan) Z Shimizu	6	6	6

==== Section 4 ====
First round
(United Kingdom) Neville Deed	4	4	1
(United Kingdom) Percy Pinckney	6	6	6
(United Kingdom) Maurice Blythman
(United Kingdom) Shirley Dillon	w/o
(South Africa) PM Dixon	6	4	3	2
(Canada) Henry Mayes	3	6	6	6
(United Kingdom) JB Ward	7	0	6	3	2
(United Kingdom) Robert Walker	5	6	2	6	6
(United Kingdom) HJ Gilbert	3	6	1	0
(United Kingdom) Roderick McNair	6	1	6	6
(United Kingdom) Neville Willford	6	6	6
(United Kingdom) Bill Swinden	2	2	4
(United Kingdom) Fred Lindemann	w/o
(United Kingdom) MRL White
(United Kingdom) JG Hogan	3	6	6	6
(United Kingdom) Geoffrey Youll	6	1	2	4

Second round
(United Kingdom) P Pinckney	6	6	6
(United Kingdom) M Blythman	2	1	1
(Canada) H Mayes	6	6	4	6
(United Kingdom) R Walker	1	2	6	4
(United Kingdom) R McNair	6	4	4	4
(United Kingdom) N Willford	0	6	6	6
(United Kingdom) MRL White	3^{r}
(United Kingdom) JG Hogan	3

Third round
(United Kingdom) P Pinckney	0	7	5	3
(Canada) H Mayes	6	5	7	6
(United Kingdom) N Willford	6	1	6	6
(United Kingdom) JG Hogan	2	6	1	2

Fourth round
(Canada) H Mayes	6	1	5
(United Kingdom) N Willford	8	6	7

=== Bottom half ===
==== Section 5 ====
First round
(United States) Samuel Hardy	6	6	6
(United Kingdom) T Moss	0	3	2
(Australia) Stanley Doust	6	6	6
(United Kingdom) Richard Turnbull	1	2	0
(Australia) Randolph Lycett	6	6	6
(United States) Clark Hopkins	2	0	4
(United Kingdom) George Thomas	2	6	6	6
(United Kingdom) Alfred Ingram	6	2	3	3
(United Kingdom) Alfred Beamish	6	6	6
(United Kingdom) SF Thol	4	2	2
(United Kingdom) Humphrey Milford	6	5	2	6	6
(Spain) Luis de Olivares	3	7	6	1	4
(Belgium) Paul de Borman	6	6	3	8
(France) Alain Gerbault	1	4	6	6
(United Kingdom) Major Ritchie	6	6	7
(United Kingdom) Hew Stoker	1	3	5

Second round
(United States) S Hardy	6	1	3	8	0^{r}
(Australia) S Doust	2	6	6	6	0
(Australia) R Lycett	2	6	6	8
(United Kingdom) G Thomas	6	1	3	6
(United Kingdom) A Beamish	6	6	6
(United Kingdom) H Milford	0	2	1
(Belgium) P de Borman	4	1	2
(United Kingdom) M Ritchie	6	6	6

Third round
(Australia) S Doust	2	7	3	4
(Australia) R Lycett	6	5	6	6
(United Kingdom) A Beamish	6	6	3	6
(United Kingdom) M Ritchie	4	4	6	3

Fourth round
(Australia) R Lycett	6	6	4	6
(United Kingdom) A Beamish	2	0	6	0

==== Section 6 ====
First round
(United Kingdom) L Robinson	1	1	5
(United States) Fred Inman	6	6	7
(United Kingdom) Algernon Kingscote
(South Africa) E Coutts	w/o
(United States) Arthur Lovibond	3	6	3
(United Kingdom) Arthur Lowe	6	8	6
(United Kingdom) E Morris Hall
(United Kingdom) Frank Wallers	w/o
(United Kingdom) Donald Kingdon	4	2	3
(United Kingdom) James Cecil Parke	6	6	6
(United States) Bill Johnston	6	6	6
(United Kingdom) John Flavelle	2	4	2
(United Kingdom) Stanley Franklin
(India) Sirdar Dass	w/o
(United States) Bill Tilden	6	6	6
(United Kingdom) HR Fussell	3	2	1

Second round
(United States) F Inman	2	0	0
(United Kingdom) A Kingscote	6	6	6
(United Kingdom) A Lowe	6	6	6
(United Kingdom) E Morris Hall	1	2	2
(United Kingdom) JC Parke	7	2	6	8
(United States) W Johnston	5	6	2	6
(United Kingdom) S Franklin	1	1	0
(United States) W Tilden	6	6	6

Third round
(United Kingdom) A Kingscote	8	6	6
(United Kingdom) A Lowe	6	4	0
(United Kingdom) JC Parke	3	2	4
(United States) W Tilden	6	6	6

Fourth round
(United Kingdom) A Kingscote	3	7	4	7	3
(United States) W Tilden	6	5	6	5	6

==== Section 7 ====
First round
(United Kingdom) CW Murray	4	4	8
(United Kingdom) Ambrose Dudley	6	6	10
(South Africa) Cecil Blackbeard	6	6	6
(India) Yasin Mohamed	0	1	0
(United Kingdom) B Wood-Hill	3	3	2
(United Kingdom) George Stoddart	6	6	6
(South Africa) George Dodd	6	6	6
(United States) EA Niles	2	3	1
(Sweden) Carl-Erik von Braun	4	1	2
(Romania) Nicolae Mișu	6	6	6
(Netherlands) Gerard Scheurleer	7	4	6	6	4
(United Kingdom) A. Wallis Myers	9	6	2	4	3^{r}
(United Kingdom) CS Grace	4	1	3
(United Kingdom) Frank Jarvis	6	6	6
(United Kingdom) Mark Hick	7	6	4	6	1
(United Kingdom) JM Bell	5	8	6	4	6

Second round
(United Kingdom) A Dudley	3	6	6	4	3
(South Africa) C Blackbeard	6	4	2	6	6
(United Kingdom) G Stoddart	2	6	0
(South Africa) G Dodd	6	8	6
(Romania) N Mișu	5	4	6	3
(Netherlands) G Scheurleer	7	6	4	6
(United Kingdom) F Jarvis	3	6	4	7	6
(United Kingdom) JM Bell	6	4	6	5	2

Third round
(South Africa) C Blackbeard	6	8	4	6
(South Africa) G Dodd	2	6	6	3
(Netherlands) G Scheurleer	3	4	0
(United Kingdom) F Jarvis	6	6	6

Fourth round
(South Africa) C Blackbeard	6	6	6
(United Kingdom) F Jarvis	2	1	4

==== Section 8 ====
First round
(United Kingdom) Ernest Lamb
(United Kingdom) CS Galbraith	w/o
(United Kingdom) John Cecil Masterman	3	6	6	3	6
(United Kingdom) Ulysses Williams	6	4	3	6	3
(South Africa) Charles Winslow	6	6	6
(United Kingdom) EB Milner	2	2	2
(United States) Chuck Garland	7	6	6	6
(United Kingdom) Noel Turnbull	5	8	3	3
(United Kingdom) Alex Drew	12	8	6
(United Kingdom) RS Barnes	10	6	4
(United Kingdom) AW Davson	0	1	3
(France) Max Decugis	6	6	6
(United States) AW Asthalter	w/o
(United Kingdom) Jack Hillyard
(United Kingdom) PE Harrison	1	0	2
(United Kingdom) Leslie Godfree	6	6	6

Second round
(United Kingdom) E Lamb	7	1	2	1
(United Kingdom) JC Masterman	5	6	6	6
(South Africa) C Winslow	4	1	3
(United States) C Garland	6	6	6
(United Kingdom) A Drew	6	9	6	6
(France) M Decugis	4	7	8	2
(United Kingdom) J Hillyard	6	5	4	6	6
(United Kingdom) L Godfree	4	7	6	2	3

Third round
(United Kingdom) JC Masterman	4	2	1
(United States) C Garland	6	6	6
(United Kingdom) A Drew	4	6	6	6
(United Kingdom) J Hillyard	6	1	1	4

Fourth round
(United States) C Garland	6	6	6
(United Kingdom) A Drew	4	2	1

Preceded by 1921 Australasian Championships – Men's singles	Grand Slam men's singles	Succeeded by 1921 U.S. National Championships – Men's singles
