= 1922 International Lawn Tennis Challenge =

1922 edition of the International Lawn Tennis Challenge

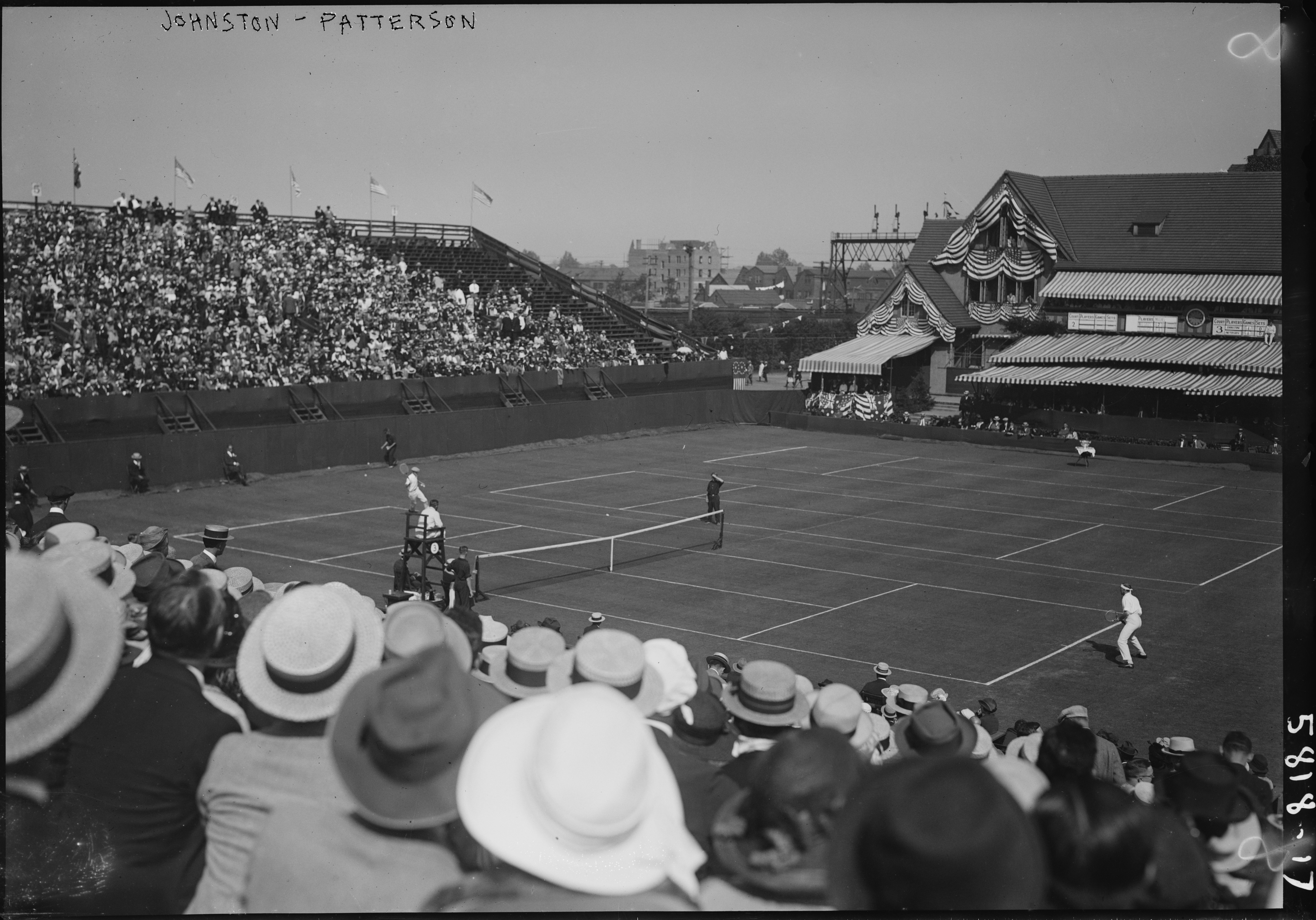
- Bill Johnston (US) vs. Gerald Patterson (Australasia) in the Challenge Round at the West Side Tennis Club

Details
- Duration: 17 June – 5 September 1922
- Edition: 17th
- Teams: 11

Champion
- Winning nation: United States

The 1922 International Lawn Tennis Challenge was the 17th edition of what is now known as the Davis Cup. The tournament saw first-time entries from Italy and Romania. Australasia would storm through the preliminary round, but would fall to defending champions the United States in the challenge round. The final was played at the West Side Tennis Club in New York City, New York on 1–5 September.

== Draw ==
First round 19–24 June
Great Britain
bye
Italy	w/o
Japan
Spain	w/o
Philippines
Beckenham, England (grass)
Romania	0
India	5
Scarborough, England (grass)
Australasia	4
Belgium	0
Czechoslovakia	w/o
Hawaii (Note: Canada and Hawaii defaulted after being drawn away to European entries, because of the difficulties of travel. The withdrawals of Japan and the Philippines were likely for the same reason; in the following year the draw would be divided into geographical zones to lessen the amount of travel required.)
France	w/o
Canada
bye
Denmark

Quarterfinals; 17 June–15 July
London, England (grass)
Great Britain	4
Italy	1
Bristol, England (grass)
Spain	4
India	1
London, England (clay)
Australasia	5
Czechoslovakia	0
Copenhagen, Denmark
France	4
Denmark	1

Semifinals; 10–14 August
Great Britain
Spain	w/o
Boston, MA, United States (grass)
Australasia	4
France	1

Final; 17–19 August
Philadelphia, PA, United States (grass)
Spain	1
Australasia	4

=== First round ===
India vs. Romania

India
5
Beckenham Cricket Club, Beckenham, England
19–20 June 1922
Grass

Romania
0

			1	2	3	4	5
1	(India) (Romania)	Athar-Ali Fyzee; Nicolae Mișu	3; 6	5; 7	6; 4	6; 4	6; 0
2	(India) (Romania)	Hassan-Ali Fyzee; Misu Stern	6; 0	6; 1	6; 1
3	(India) (Romania)	Hassan-Ali Fyzee / Cotah Ramaswami; Nicolae Mișu / Misu Stern	6; 2	6; 4	6; 0
4	(India) (Romania)	Athar-Ali Fyzee; Misu Stern	6; 2	6; 2	6; 1
5	(India) (Romania)	Hassan-Ali Fyzee; Nicolae Mișu	4; 6	6; 1	6; 1	7; 5

Australasia vs. Belgium

Australasia
4
Yorkshire Lawn Tennis Club, Scarborough, England
22–24 June 1922
Grass

Belgium
0

			1	2	3	4	5
1	(Australasia) (Belgium)	Gerald Patterson; Jean Washer	6; 3	6; 4	6; 4
2	(Australasia) (Belgium)	James Anderson; Georges Watson	6; 2	6; 1	6; 2
3	(Australasia) (Belgium)	James Anderson / Pat O'Hara Wood; Jean Washer / Georges Watson	6; 1	6; 2	4; 6	7; 9	7; 5
4	(Australasia) (Belgium)	James Anderson; Jean Washer	6; 4	6; 3	6; 2
5	(Australasia) (Belgium)	Gerald Patterson; Georges Watson						not played

=== Quarterfinals ===
Great Britain vs. Italy

Great Britain
4
Roehampton Lawn Tennis Club, London, England
19–21 June 1922
Grass

Italy
1

			1	2	3	4	5
1	(United Kingdom) (Italy)	Algernon Kingscote; Cesare Colombo	7; 5	6; 4	6; 1
2	(United Kingdom) (Italy)	Gordon Lowe; Mino Balbi Di Robecco	6; 1	6; 3	6; 1
3	(United Kingdom) (Italy)	Algernon Kingscote / Frank Riseley; Mino Balbi Di Robecco / Cesare Colombo	6; 1	6; 4	6; 0
4	(United Kingdom) (Italy)	Algernon Kingscote; Mino Balbi Di Robecco						w/o
5	(United Kingdom) (Italy)	Gordon Lowe; Cesare Colombo	6; 1	6; 2	6; 0

Spain vs. India

Spain
4
Bristol Lawn Tennis Club, Bristol, England
13–15 July 1922
Grass

India
1

			1	2	3	4	5
1	(Spain) (India)	Manuel de Gomar; Athar-Ali Fyzee	1; 6	6; 2	6; 3	3; 6	6; 1
2	(Spain) (India)	Manuel Alonso Areizaga; Hassan Ali Fyzee	6; 1	6; 2	6; 2
3	(Spain) (India)	Eduardo Flaquer / Manuel de Gomar; Hassan Ali Fyzee / Cotah Ramaswami	6; 3	5; 7	9; 11	10; 8	4; 6
4	(Spain) (India)	Manuel de Gomar; Hassan Ali Fyzee	6; 1	6; 3	3; 6	6; 3
5	(Spain) (India)	Manuel Alonso Areizaga; Athar-Ali Fyzee	6; 3	6; 4	0; 6	6; 4

Australasia vs. Czechoslovakia

Australasia
5
Roehampton Lawn Tennis Club, London, England
14–15 July 1922
Clay

Czechoslovakia
0

			1	2	3	4	5
1	(Australasia) (Czechoslovakia)	Gerald Patterson; Friedrich Rohrer	6; 1	6; 3	3; 6	6; 2
2	(Australasia) (Czechoslovakia)	James Anderson; Karel Ardelt	7; 5	6; 4	6; 4
3	(Australasia) (Czechoslovakia)	Gerald Patterson / Rupert Wertheim; Karel Ardelt / Friedrich Rohrer	9; 7	6; 0	6; 3
4	(Australasia) (Czechoslovakia)	Gerald Patterson; Karel Ardelt	6; 3	6; 2	2; 6	6; 2
5	(Australasia) (Czechoslovakia)	James Anderson; Friedrich Rohrer	4; 6	6; 4	6; 3	6; 0

Denmark vs. France

Denmark
1
Copenhagen, Denmark
17–19 June 1922

France
4

			1	2	3	4	5
1	(Denmark) (France)	Erik Tegner; Jean Borotra	0; 6	6; 3	4; 6	6; 1	4; 6
2	(Denmark) (France)	Vagn Ingerslev; Jean Couiteas	8; 6	6; 3	6; 1
3	(Denmark) (France)	Erik Tegner / Erik Worm; Jean Borotra / Henri Cochet	6; 3	2; 6	6; 2	8; 10	2; 6
4	(Denmark) (France)	Vagn Ingerslev; Jean Borotra	3; 6	2; 6	4; 6
5	(Denmark) (France)	Erik Tegner; Henri Cochet	5; 7	2; 6	7; 9

=== Semifinals ===
Australasia vs. France

Australasia
4
Longwood Cricket Club, Boston, MA, United States
10–14 August 1922
Grass

France
1

			1	2	3	4	5
1	(Australasia) (France)	Gerald Patterson; André Gobert	4; 6	3; 6	6; 3	6; 4	6; 3
2	(Australasia) (France)	Pat O'Hara Wood; Henri Cochet	4; 6	6; 3	0; 6	9; 7	3; 6
3	(Australasia) (France)	Pat O'Hara Wood / Gerald Patterson; Henri Cochet / André Gobert	6; 0	6; 8	4; 6	6; 3	10; 8
4	(Australasia) (France)	Gerald Patterson; Henri Cochet	6; 2	2; 6	6; 4	6; 2
5	(Australasia) (France)	Pat O'Hara Wood; André Gobert	2; 6	6; 2	6; 1	6; 4

=== Final ===
Australasia vs. Spain

Australasia
4
Germantown Cricket Club, Philadelphia, PA, United States
17–19 August 1922
Grass

Spain
1

			1	2	3	4	5
1	(Australasia) (Spain)	Gerald Patterson; Manuel de Gomar	6; 3	8; 6	6; 4
2	(Australasia) (Spain)	Pat O'Hara Wood; Manuel Alonso Areizaga	6; 2	6; 3	2; 6	6; 8	1; 6
3	(Australasia) (Spain)	Pat O'Hara Wood / Gerald Patterson; Manuel Alonso Areizaga / Manuel de Gomar	6; 3	6; 3	6; 4
4	(Australasia) (Spain)	Gerald Patterson; Manuel Alonso Areizaga	8; 6	6; 2	6; 2
5	(Australasia) (Spain)	Pat O'Hara Wood; Manuel de Gomar	6; 8	3; 6	6; 0	6; 4	6; 1

== Challenge Round ==
United States vs. Australasia

United States
4
West Side Tennis Club, New York, NY, United States
1–5 September 1922
Grass

Australasia
1

			1	2	3	4	5
1	(United States) (Australasia)	Bill Tilden; Gerald Patterson	7; 5	10; 8	6; 0
2	(United States) (Australasia)	Bill Johnston; James Anderson	6; 1	6; 2	6; 3
3	(United States) (Australasia)	Vincent Richards / Bill Tilden; Pat O'Hara Wood / Gerald Patterson	4; 6	0; 6	3; 6
4	(United States) (Australasia)	Bill Tilden; James Anderson	6; 4	5; 7	3; 6	6; 4	6; 2
5	(United States) (Australasia)	Bill Johnston; Gerald Patterson	6; 2	6; 2	6; 1
