= 1921 International Lawn Tennis Challenge =

1921 edition of the International Lawn Tennis Challenge

Details
- Duration: 23 May – 5 September 1921
- Edition: 16th
- Teams: 11

Champion
- Winning nation: United States

The 1921 International Lawn Tennis Challenge was the 16th edition of what is now known as the Davis Cup. In the playoff finals, newcomers Japan surprised Australasia 4–1, but would fall to defending champions the United States in the Challenge Round. The final was played 2–5 September at the West Side Tennis Club in New York City.

== Teams ==
The tournament saw a boom in entries, with a record 12 teams entering to challenge for the cup. Argentina, Czechoslovakia, Denmark, India, Japan, the Philippines, and Spain all entered the tournament for the first time, although Argentina and the Philippines withdrew after the draw.

== Draw ==
First round May–July
France
bye
India
bye
Japan	w/o
Philippines
Prague, Czechoslovakia
Czechoslovakia	2
Belgium	3
Toronto, Ontario (clay)
Canada	0
Australasia	5
Hendon, England (clay)
Great Britain	4
Spain	1
bye
Argentina
bye
Denmark

Quarterfinals; 16 July–6 August
Paris, France (clay)
France	1
India	4
Japan	w/o
Belgium
Pittsburgh, Pennsylvania (grass)
Australasia	3
Great Britain	2
Argentina
Denmark	w/o

Semifinals; 18–21 August
Chicago, Illinois (grass)
India	0
Japan	5
Cleveland, Ohio (grass)
Australasia	5
Denmark	0

Final; 22–27 August
Newport, Rhode Island (grass)
Japan	4
Australasia	1

=== First round ===
Czechoslovakia vs. Belgium

Czechoslovakia
2
Prague, Czechoslovakia
13–16 June 1921

Belgium
3

			1	2	3	4	5
1	(Czechoslovakia) (Belgium)	Karel Ardelt; Jean Washer	6; 4	5; 7	5; 7	3; 6
2	(Czechoslovakia) (Belgium)	Ladislav Žemla; Albert Lammens	6; 2	6; 4	6; 2
3	(Czechoslovakia) (Belgium)	Jaroslav Just / Ladislav Žemla; Albert Lammens / Jean Washer	6; 4	6; 3	6; 8	4; 6	0; 6
4	(Czechoslovakia) (Belgium)	Ladislav Žemla; Jean Washer	3; 6	6; 3	9; 7	2; 6	6; 2
5	(Czechoslovakia) (Belgium)	Karel Ardelt; Albert Lammens	3; 6	2; 6	6; 4	1; 6

Great Britain v Spain

Great Britain
4
London Country Club, Hendon, England
23–25 May 1921
Clay

Spain
1

			1	2	3	4	5
1	(United Kingdom) (Spain)	Gordon Lowe; Manuel de Gomar	6; 3	4; 6	6; 1	6; 0
2	(United Kingdom) (Spain)	Randolph Lycett; Manuel Alonso Areizaga	6; 4	6; 2	6; 4
3	(United Kingdom) (Spain)	Max Woosnam / Randolph Lycett; Manuel Alonso Areizaga / Manuel de Gomar	2; 6	9; 7	6; 2	6; 2
4	(United Kingdom) (Spain)	Gordon Lowe; Manuel Alonso Areizaga	6; 8	1; 6	6; 8
5	(United Kingdom) (Spain)	Randolph Lycett; Manuel de Gomar	6; 1	6; 8	7; 9	6; 3	6; 2

Canada vs. Australasia

Canada
0
Toronto Lawn Tennis Club, Toronto, Ontario
23–27 July 1921
Clay

Australasia
5

			1	2	3	4	5
1	(Canada) (Australasia)	Henri Laframboise; James Anderson	6; 4	5; 7	0; 6	2; 6
2	(Canada) (Australasia)	Paul Bennett; John Hawkes	6; 8	4; 6	4; 6
3	(Canada) (Australasia)	Paul Bennett / George Holmes; James Anderson / Clarence Todd	2; 6	3; 6	1; 6
4	(Canada) (Australasia)	Paul Bennett; James Anderson	3; 6	0; 6	2; 6
5	(Canada) (Australasia)	Henri Laframboise; Clarence Todd	2; 6	2; 6	8; 6	2; 6

=== Quarterfinals ===
France vs. India

France
1
Racing Club de France, Paris, France
16–18 July 1921
Clay

India
4

			1	2	3	4	5
1	(France) (India)	Jean-Pierre Samazeuilh; Sydney Jacob	6; 3	8; 6	7; 5
2	(France) (India)	William Laurentz; Mohammed Sleem	6; 4	2; 6	6; 3	2; 6	0; 6
3	(France) (India)	Jacques Brugnon / William Laurentz; Lewis Deane / Athar-Ali Fyzee	1; 6	6; 2	7; 5	2; 6	4; 6
4	(France) (India)	Jean-Pierre Samazeuilh; Mohammed Sleem	1; 6	3; 6	3; 6
5	(France) (India)	Jacques Brugnon; Lewis Deane	3; 6	6; 4	5; 7	6; 4	6; 8

Australasia vs. Great Britain

Australasia
3
Allegheny County Club, Pittsburgh, Pennsylvania
4–6 August 1921
Grass

Great Britain
2

			1	2	3	4	5
1	(Australasia) (United Kingdom)	James Anderson; Max Woosnam	6; 4	6; 2	6; 4
2	(Australasia) (United Kingdom)	John Hawkes; Gordon Lowe	4; 6	4; 6	1; 6
3	(Australasia) (United Kingdom)	James Anderson / Clarence Todd; Noel Turnbull / Max Woosnam	4; 6	9; 7	4; 6	6; 2	6; 4
4	(Australasia) (United Kingdom)	James Anderson; Gordon Lowe	6; 2	6; 3	3; 6	6; 2
5	(Australasia) (United Kingdom)	John Hawkes; Max Woosnam	3; 6	6; 0	9; 7	3; 6	3; 6

=== Semifinals ===
India vs. Japan

India
0
Lake Forest, Illinois
18–20 August 1921
Grass

Japan
5

			1	2	3	4	5
1	(India) (Japan)	Mohammed Sleem; Zenzo Shimizu	5; 7	6; 2	0; 6	2; 6
2	(India) (Japan)	Hassan Ali Fyzee; Ichiya Kumagae	6; 3	3; 6	3; 6	7; 9
3	(India) (Japan)	Lewis Deane / Hassan Ali Fyzee; Ichiya Kumagae / Zenzo Shimizu	1; 6	1; 6	6; 2	6; 2	0; 6
4	(India) (Japan)	Hassan Ali Fyzee; Zenzo Shimizu	2; 6	1; 6	7; 9
5	(India) (Japan)	Mohammed Sleem; Ichiya Kumagae	7; 9	1; 6	1; 6

Australasia vs. Denmark

Australasia
5
Mayfield Country Club, Cleveland, Ohio
19–21 August 1921
Grass

Denmark
0

			1	2	3	4	5
1	(Australasia) (Denmark)	James Anderson; Vagn Ingerslev	6; 0	6; 1	7; 5
2	(Australasia) (Denmark)	Norman Peach; Erik Tegner	7; 5	6; 2	6; 4
3	(Australasia) (Denmark)	James Anderson / Clarence Todd; Povl Henriksen / Erik Tegner	6; 0	6; 2	6; 1
4	(Australasia) (Denmark)	James Anderson; Erik Tegner	6; 0	6; 2	6; 1
5	(Australasia) (Denmark)	Norman Peach; Vagn Ingerslev	3; 6	6; 2	6; 0	3; 6	6; 2

=== Final ===
Japan vs. Australasia

Japan
4
Newport Casino, Newport, Rhode Island
22–27 August 1921
Grass

Australasia
1

			1	2	3	4	5
1	(Japan) (Australasia)	Zenzo Shimizu; James Anderson	6; 4	7; 5	6; 4
2	(Japan) (Australasia)	Ichiya Kumagae; John Hawkes	3; 6	2; 6	8; 6	6; 2	6; 3
3	(Japan) (Australasia)	Ichiya Kumagae / Zenzo Shimizu; James Anderson / Clarence Todd	6; 4	4; 6	6; 8	0; 6
4	(Japan) (Australasia)	Zenzo Shimizu; John Hawkes	4; 6	6; 2	6; 3	6; 2
5	(Japan) (Australasia)	Ichiya Kumagae; James Anderson	3; 6	6; 4	2; 6	7; 5	6; 2

== Challenge Round ==
United States vs. Japan

United States
5
West Side Tennis Club, New York, New York
2–5 September 1921
Grass

Japan
0

			1	2	3	4	5
1	(United States) (Japan)	Bill Johnston; Ichiya Kumagae	6; 2	6; 4	6; 2
2	(United States) (Japan)	Bill Tilden; Zenzo Shimizu	5; 7	4; 6	7; 5	6; 2	6; 1
3	(United States) (Japan)	Watson Washburn / Richard Norris Williams; Ichiya Kumagae / Zenzo Shimizu	6; 2	7; 5	4; 6	7; 5
4	(United States) (Japan)	Bill Tilden; Ichiya Kumagae	9; 7	6; 4	6; 1
5	(United States) (Japan)	Bill Johnston; Zenzo Shimizu	6; 3	5; 7	6; 2	6; 4
