= Sune Malmström =

Swedish tennis player (1897–1961)

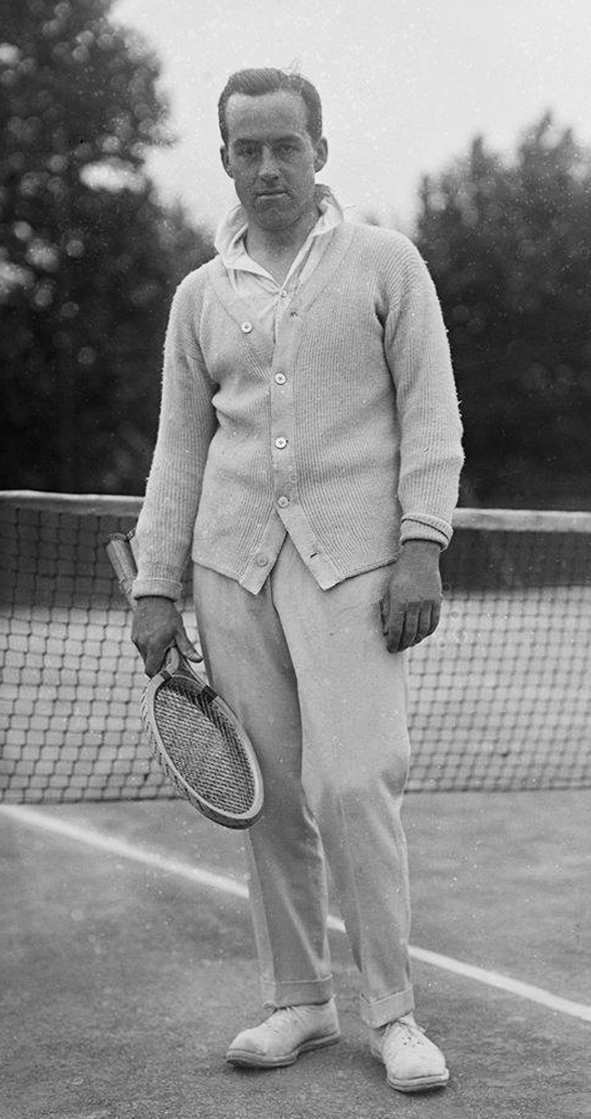
- Malmström in 1922
- Full name: Jarl Sune Malmström
- Country (sports): Sweden
- Born: 28 October 1897 Malmö, Sweden
- Died: 17 December 1961 (aged 64) Stockholm, Sweden

Singles

Grand Slam singles results
- Wimbledon: 2R (1920)

Other tournaments
- Olympic Games: QF (1920)

Doubles

Grand Slam doubles results
- Wimbledon: 3R (1920)

Other doubles tournaments
- Olympic Games: 1R (1920)

Mixed doubles

Other mixed doubles tournaments
- Olympic Games: QF (1920)

Jarl Sune Malmström (28 October 1897 – 17 December 1961) was a Swedish male tennis player who represented Sweden in the Davis Cup and the Olympic Games.

== Tennis career ==
Malmström competed in the singles, doubles and mixed doubles events at the 1920 Summer Olympics. In the singles event, he reached the quarterfinal after a bye in the first round and wins against Ladislav Žemla and Armand Simon. In the quarterfinal, he was defeated by South African Louis Raymond. With compatriot Carl-Erik von Braun, he lost in the first round of the doubles event against Jean Washer and Albert Lammens. In the mixed doubles event he teamed up with Lily Strömberg and after byes in the first and second round they lost the quarterfinal match against the Danish team Amory Hansen and Erik Tegner in three sets.

Malmström participated in the 1920 Wimbledon Championships, playing in the singles and doubles events. In the singles, he made it to the second round after a victory in the first round against Beverley Covell. In the second round, he lost in straight sets to Augustos Zerlendis. With countryman Carl-Erik von Braun he reached the third round of the doubles event in which Algernon Kingscote and James Cecil Parke proved too strong.

== See also ==
- List of Sweden Davis Cup team representatives
