= Otto Woffek =

Czech tennis player

Personal information
- Nationality: Czech
- Born: 1 February 1892 Smíchov
- Died: Unknown

Sport
- Country: Czechoslovakia
- Sport: Tennis
- Rank: 9, men's doubles; 32, men's singles
- Event(s): 1920 Summer Olympics, Antwerp

Achievements and titles
- Olympic finals: 1920

Otto Josef Maria Woffek (born 1892, date of death unknown) was a Czech tennis player. He competed in the men's singles and doubles events at the 1920 Summer Olympics. His partner in the doubles was František Týř, where they faced eventual gold medalists Noel Turnbull and Max Woosnam.

In the singles, Woffek faced Alfred Beamish.
