= Enrique de Satrústegui =

Spanish tennis player (1897–1977)

Personal information
- Born: 10 February 1897 Barcelona, Spain
- Died: 24 March 1977 (aged 80)

Sport
- Sport: Tennis

Enrique de Satrústegui Fernández Barrié Vicuña (10 February 1897 – 24 March 1977), the fourth Baron de Satrústegui, was a Spanish male tennis player. He represented Spain at the 1920 Summer Olympics and competed at the men's singles. De Satrústegui was selected for the team by the Royal Spanish Tennis Federation along with Eduardo Flaquer and brothers José María Alonso and Manuel Alonso Areizaga, with Luis de Olivares (the first Spanish player to play in a Grand Slam tournament, earlier in 1920) "surprisingly left out of that list."

He also competed in the 1923 World Covered Court Championships, losing in round one, and a 1920 tournament in Barcelona, losing in round two.

De Satrústegui was the son of Enrique de Satrústegui y Barrié and Rosa María Fernández Vicuña. He succeeded his father as Baron de Satrústegui in 1935. Aside from playing tennis, he was an industrial engineer. He married Clotilde Abrisqueta y Delgado.

He had at least one son, Enrique de Satrústegui y Abrisqueta, who applied for the succession to the title of Baron after his death.
