= Albert Lammens =

Belgian tennis player

- Country (sports): Belgium
- Born: 17 June 1890
- Died: 7 October 1933 (aged 43)

Singles

Other tournaments
- Olympic Games: 3R (1920)

Doubles

Other doubles tournaments
- Olympic Games: 2R (1920, 1924)

Other mixed doubles tournaments
- Olympic Games: QF (1920)

Albert Lammens (17 June 1890 – 7 October 1933) was a Belgian tennis player who represented Belgium in the Davis Cup and the Olympic Games. In 1919 Lammens won the singles title at the Belgian Championships and with Jean Washer won the doubles title in 1920 and 1921.

He took part in the 1920 Summer Olympics, organized in his native county, and in the 1924 Summer Olympics. In the 1920 singles event he won the first round against Hans Syz, followed by a victory over Carl-Eric von Braun in the second round but in the third round Ichiya Kumagae proved too strong. In the 1920 doubles event Lammens partnered with Jean Washer. They defeated Sune Malström and Carl-Eric von Braun in the first round but lost in the second round in straight sets to the Japanese pair Ichiya Kumagae and Seiichiro Kashio. He played in the mixed doubles together with Anne Chaudoir and after a bye in the first round and a win in the second against Jeanne Vaussard and François Blanchy, they were defeated in the third round in three sets by the eventual Olympic champions Suzanne Lenglen and Max Decugis.

At the 1924 Summer Olympics Lammens competed in the singles and doubles events. In the singles he had a bye in the first round and lost in straight sets to Pavel Macenauer in the second, winning just a single game. With compatriot Stéphane Halot he had a bye in the first round of the doubles event but lost in the second round to the French team of René Lacoste and Jean Borotra.

He competed for the Belgian Davis Cup team in 1919, losing to France, and in 1921, winning against Czechoslovakia.
