= 1912 Australasian Championships =

- Date: 30 December 1912 – 1 January 1913
- Edition: 8th
- Category: Grand Slam (ITF)
- Surface: Grass
- Location: Hastings, New Zealand
- Venue: Hastings Lawn Tennis Club

Champions

Singles
- (United Kingdom of Great Britain and Ireland) James Cecil Parke

Doubles
- (United Kingdom of Great Britain and Ireland) Charles Dixon / (United Kingdom of Great Britain and Ireland) James Cecil Parke
- Australasian Championships

The 1912 Australasian Championships was a tennis tournament that took place on outdoor grass courts at Hastings, New Zealand, from 30 December 1912 until 1 January 1913. It was the 8th edition of the Australian Championships (now known as the Australian Open), the first held in Hastings, the second held in New Zealand, after Christchurch in 1906, and the third Grand Slam tournament of the year. Travel by sea was slow, limiting the attendance of Australian players, and New Zealand player Anthony Wilding did not return from Europe. The singles title was won by Irish James Cecil Parke.

== Finals ==
=== Men's singles ===
(United Kingdom of Great Britain and Ireland) James Cecil Parke defeated (United Kingdom of Great Britain and Ireland) Alfred Beamish, 3–6, 6–3, 1–6, 6–1, 7–5.

=== Men's doubles ===
(United Kingdom of Great Britain and Ireland) Charles Dixon / (United Kingdom of Great Britain and Ireland) James Cecil Parke defeated (United Kingdom of Great Britain and Ireland) Alfred Beamish / (United Kingdom of Great Britain and Ireland) Gordon Lowe, 6–4, 6–4, 6–2.

Preceded by 1912 U.S. National Championships	Grand Slams	Succeeded by 1913 Wimbledon Championships
