= Armand Simon =

Swiss tennis player

- Country (sports): Switzerland
- Born: 20 May 1887 Niederurnen

Armand Theodor Carl Simon (20 May 1887 – 27 December 1966) was a Swiss tennis player. He competed at the 1920 Summer Olympics representing Switzerland. Charles participated in the men's singles and in men's doubles. In the men's doubles at the 1920 Summer Olympics, he partnered with fellow tennis player Hans Syz.

== World Championships finals ==
=== Doubles: 2 runner-ups ===
| Result | Year | Championship | Surface | Partner | Opponents | Score |
|---|---|---|---|---|---|---|
| Loss | 1922 | World Covered Court Championships | Wood | (Switzerland) Charles Martin | (France) Henri Cochet (France) Jean Couiteas | 6–2, 2–6, 1–6, 4–6 |
