= Cecil Blackbeard =

South African tennis player

- Full name: Cecil Roberts Blackbeard
- Country (sports): South Africa
- Born: 26 January 1900 King William's Town, Cape Colony
- Died: 19 April 1954 (aged 54) Benoni, South Africa

Grand Slam singles results
- Wimbledon: QF (1920)

Other tournaments
- WHCC: 2R (1920)

Grand Slam doubles results
- Wimbledon: QF (1920)

Other doubles tournaments
- WHCC: F (1920)
- Olympic Games: QF (1920)

Grand Slam mixed doubles results
- Wimbledon: 2R (1920)

Cecil Roberts Blackbeard (26 January 1900 – 19 April 1954) was a South African male tennis player who represented South Africa in the Davis Cup and the Olympic Games. He competed in the doubles event at the 1920 Summer Olympics. With compatriot George Dodd, he reached the quarterfinal round after victories over Alfred Beamish and Francis Lowe in the first round, followed by a win over Jean-Pierre Samazeuilh and Daniel Lawton in the second. In the quarterfinal they were defeated in four sets by Max Decugis and Pierre Albarran.

Blackbeard participated in the 1920 Wimbledon Championships playing in all three events (singles, doubles, mixed). In the singles event he made it to the quarterfinal round after victories over Yasin Mohamed, Ambrose Dudley, his doubles partner George Dodd and Frank Jarvis. In the quarterfinal he lost in four sets to Chuck Garland. With countryman George Dodd he also reached the quarterfinal of the doubles event in which Algernon Kingscote and Cecil Parke proved too strong. He was less successful in the mixed doubles, reaching the second round with D.K. Betty.

In May 1920, he reached the final of the doubles event at the World Hard Court Championships, played at the Stade Français in Paris. With his teammate Nicolae Mişu they were defeated in the final by the French pair André Gobert and William Laurentz in straight sets.

In 1926, Blackbeard reached the final of the singles event at the South African Championships which he lost in three straight sets to countryman Jack Condon. At the same championships he won the doubles title in 1923 with his brother, D. Blackbeard, and in 1926 with Charles Winslow.

== World Championships finals ==
=== Doubles: (1 runner-up) ===
Result	Year	Championship	Surface	Partner	Opponents	Score
Loss	1920	World Hard Court Championships	Clay	(Romania) Nicolae Mișu	(France) André Gobert (France) William Laurentz	4–6, 2–6, 1–6
