= Robert Grisar =

Belgian tennis player

Personal information
- Nationality: Belgian
- Born: 21 February 1890
- Died: 24 August 1978 (aged 88)

Sport
- Sport: Tennis

Robert Grisar (21 February 1890 – 24 August 1978) was a Belgian tennis player. He competed in the men's doubles event at the 1920 Summer Olympics.
