= 1920 Wimbledon Championships – Women's doubles =

Women's doubles
- 1920 Wimbledon Championships

Final
- Champions: (France) Suzanne Lenglen (United States) Elizabeth Ryan
- Runners-up: (United Kingdom) Dorothea Lambert Chambers (United Kingdom) Ethel Larcombe
- Score: 6–4, 6–0

Details
- Draw: 26
- Seeds: –

Events
Singles	men	women		boys	girls
Doubles	men	women	mixed	boys	girls
← 1919 ·	Wimbledon Championships	· 1921 →

Suzanne Lenglen and Elizabeth Ryan successfully defended their title, defeating Dorothea Lambert Chambers and Ethel Larcombe in the final, 6–4, 6–0 to win the ladies' doubles tennis title at the 1920 Wimbledon Championships.

== Draw ==
=== Key ===
- Q = Qualifier
- WC = Wild card
- LL = Lucky loser
- Alt = Alternate
- SE = Special exempt
- PR = Protected ranking
- ITF = ITF entry
- JE = Junior exempt
- w/o = Walkover
- r = Retired
- d = Defaulted
- SR = Special ranking

=== Finals ===
Semifinals
(United Kingdom) Mrs Armstrong (United Kingdom) Olive Manser	1	0
(France) Suzanne Lenglen (United States) Elizabeth Ryan	6	6
(United Kingdom) Dorothea Lambert Chambers (United Kingdom) Ethel Larcombe	6	6
(United Kingdom) Winifred Beamish (United Kingdom) Hazel Hogarth	1	1

Final
(France) Suzanne Lenglen (United States) Elizabeth Ryan	6	6
(United Kingdom) Dorothea Lambert Chambers (United Kingdom) Ethel Larcombe	4	0

=== Top half ===
First round
Mrs DC Bousfield (United Kingdom) Mrs RC Cole	1	0
(United Kingdom) Mrs Armstrong (United Kingdom) Olive Manser	6	6
(United Kingdom) Mrs AA Hall (United Kingdom) Mrs Perrett	6	4
(United Kingdom) Dora Geen (United Kingdom) Margaret McKane	8	6
(United Kingdom) Mrs HA Davis (United Kingdom) Eleanor Rose	2	6	1
(United Kingdom) Kitty McKane (United Kingdom) Winifred McNair	6	2	6
(France) Suzanne Lenglen (United States) Elizabeth Ryan	6	6
(United Kingdom) Dorothy Shepherd (United Kingdom) Mrs FS Warburg	0	0
(United Kingdom) Ermyntrude Harvey (United Kingdom) Mrs CE Hunter	6	6
Miss Cane (Australia) Miss O'Hara Wood	3	2

Second round
(United Kingdom) Helen Leisk (United Kingdom) Agnes Tuckey	7	6
(United Kingdom) Dorothy Holman (United Kingdom) Edith Johnson	5	2
(United States) Molla Mallory (United Kingdom) Mabel Parton	4	6	5
(United Kingdom) Mrs Armstrong (United Kingdom) O Manser	6	1	7
(United Kingdom) D Geen (United Kingdom) M McKane	1	4
(United Kingdom) K McKane (United Kingdom) W McNair	6	6
(France) S Lenglen (United States) E Ryan	6	6
(United Kingdom) E Harvey (United Kingdom) Mrs CE Hunter	1	1

Quarterfinals
(United Kingdom) H Leisk (United Kingdom) A Tuckey	2	6	4
(United Kingdom) Mrs Armstrong (United Kingdom) O Manser	6	3	6
(United Kingdom) K McKane (United Kingdom) W McNair	3	3
(France) S Lenglen (United States) E Ryan	6	6

Semifinals
(United Kingdom) Mrs Armstrong (United Kingdom) O Manser	1	0
(France) S Lenglen (United States) E Ryan	6	6

The nationalities of Mrs DC Bousfield and Miss Cane are unknown.

=== Bottom half ===
First round
(United Kingdom) Dorothea Lambert Chambers (United Kingdom) Ethel Larcombe	6	6
(United Kingdom) A Currie (United Kingdom) F Currie	2	1
(United Kingdom) DS Holmes (United Kingdom) MB Holmes	6	8	6
(United Kingdom) Mrs J O'Neill (South Africa) Olive Winslow	3	10	2
Miss Collings (Australia) Sylvia Lance	6	6	0
(United Kingdom) Phyllis Howkins (United Kingdom) Phyllis Satterthwaite	8	1	6
(United Kingdom) Doris Craddock (United Kingdom) Gladys Lamplough	6	6
(United Kingdom) Peggy Dransfield (United Kingdom) Norah Middleton	1	0
(United Kingdom) Winifred Beamish (United Kingdom) Hazel Hogarth	6	6
(United Kingdom) Mrs RWF Harding (United Kingdom) Mrs HV Parbury	0	3

Second round
(United Kingdom) D Lambert Chambers (United Kingdom) E Larcombe	6	6
(United Kingdom) DS Holmes (United Kingdom) MB Holmes	0	0
(United Kingdom) P Howkins (United Kingdom) P Satterthwaite	6	6
(United Kingdom) D Craddock (United Kingdom) G Lamplough	4	1
(United Kingdom) W Beamish (United Kingdom) H Hogarth	6	6
(United Kingdom) Mrs HC Hextall (United Kingdom) E Tighe	1	2
(United Kingdom) Aurea Edgington (United Kingdom) Mrs Rowand Harker	8	6
(United Kingdom) Dorothy Kemmis-Betty (United Kingdom) Vera Youle	6	3

Quarterfinals
(United Kingdom) D Lambert Chambers (United Kingdom) E Larcombe	6	6
(United Kingdom) P Howkins (United Kingdom) P Satterthwaite	2	3
(United Kingdom) W Beamish (United Kingdom) H Hogarth	6	4	6
(United Kingdom) A Edgington (United Kingdom) Mrs Rowand Harker	3	6	4

Semifinals
(United Kingdom) D Lambert Chambers (United Kingdom) E Larcombe	6	6
(United Kingdom) W Beamish (United Kingdom) H Hogarth	1	1

The nationality of Miss Collings is unknown.
