= José Miguel Fernández de Liencres =

Spanish tennis player (1898–1975)

Personal information
- Nationality: Spanish
- Born: 19 October 1898 Madrid, Spain
- Died: 8 January 1975 (aged 76) Úbeda, Spain

Sport
- Sport: Tennis

José Miguel Fernández de Liencres (19 October 1898 – 8 January 1975) was a Spanish tennis player. He competed in the men's singles and doubles events at the 1920 Summer Olympics.
