= Albert Lindqvist =

Swedish tennis player

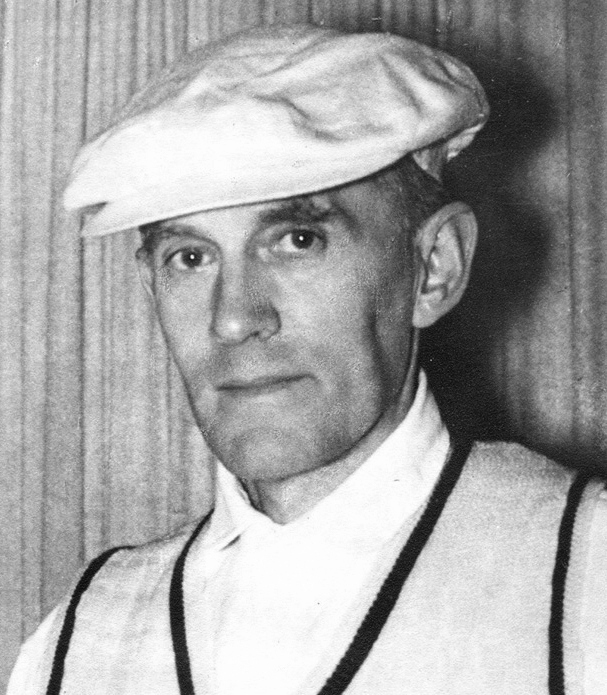
- Born: 26 February 1888; Lund, Sweden
- Died: 28 March 1961 (aged 73); Malmö, Sweden

Fritz Axel Albert Lindqvist (26 February 1888 – 28 March 1961) was a Swedish tennis player. He competed in singles and mixed doubles at the 1920 Summer Olympics and finished 14th–32nd.
