= Alberto Henri Chiesa =

Swiss tennis player

For people with similar names, see: Alberto Chiesa - Italian rugby union player, Carlo Alberto Chiesa - Italian screenwriter and Carlo Alberto Dalla Chiesa - Italian general

Alberto Henri Chiesa was a Swiss tennis player. He competed at the 1920 Summer Olympics and participated in the Men's singles tennis event.
