= Carl-Erik von Braun =

Swedish tennis player

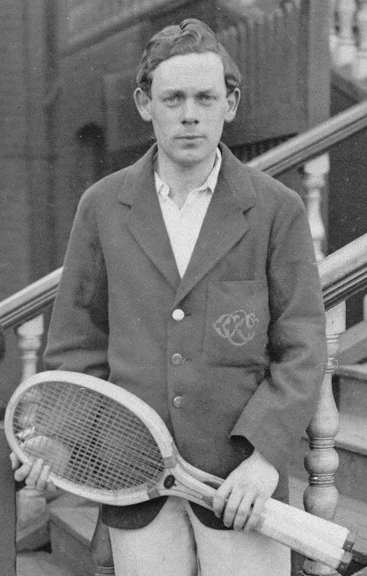
- Country (sports): Sweden
- Residence: Gothenburg, Sweden
- Born: 14 November 1896 Stockholm, Sweden
- Died: 2 November 1981 (aged 84) Helsingborg, Sweden
- Plays: Left-handed (one-handed backhand)

Singles

Grand Slam singles results
- Wimbledon: 3R (1922, 1925)

Doubles

Grand Slam doubles results
- Wimbledon: 3R (1920)

Grand Slam mixed doubles results
- Wimbledon: 1R (1921, 1922, 1925)

Team competitions
- Davis Cup: QF (1925)

Carl-Erik von Braun (14 November 1896 – 2 November 1981) was a Swedish tennis player who was active in the 1920s.

== Tennis career ==
Von Braun competed at the Wimbledon Championships between 1920 and 1925. His best singles result was reaching the third round in 1922 (lost to H.R. Fussell) and 1925 (lost to Raymond Casey). His best doubles result was at his first appearance in 1920 when he reached the third round partnering compatriot Sune Malmström.

Von Braun was a member of the Swedish Davis Cup team who played against the Netherlands during the 1925 Davis Cup competition. The match was played on clay courts in Noordwijk, Netherlands and Von Braun lost his singles matches, against Henk Timmer and Arthur Diemer Kool, in straight sets as well as his doubles match partnering Marcus Wallenberg.

He competed in the singles and doubles events at the 1920 Summer Olympics in Antwerp. In the singles event, he reached the second round, in which he was defeated by Albert Lammens. With compatriot Sune Malmström, he lost in the first round of the doubles event against Jean Washer and Albert Lammens.

== See also ==
- List of Sweden Davis Cup team representatives
