= Masayoshi Uchida =

Japanese swimmer

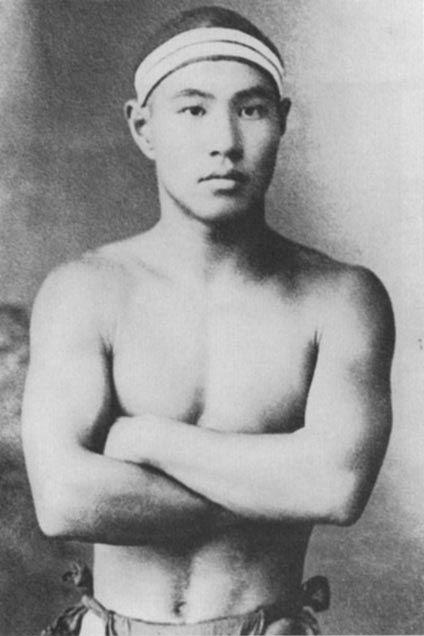

Personal information
- Native name: 内田 正練
- Nationality: Japanese
- Born: 7 January 1898 Hamamatsu, Japan
- Died: 14 February 1945 (aged 47)

Sport
- Sport: Swimming
- Strokes: freestyle

Masayoshi Uchida (内田 正練, Uchida Masayoshi; 7 January 1898 – 14 February 1945) was a Japanese swimmer. He competed in two swimming events and the diving at the 1920 Summer Olympics. He was killed in action during World War II.
