= Seiichiro Kashio =

Japanese tennis player (1892–1962)

Seichiro Kashio
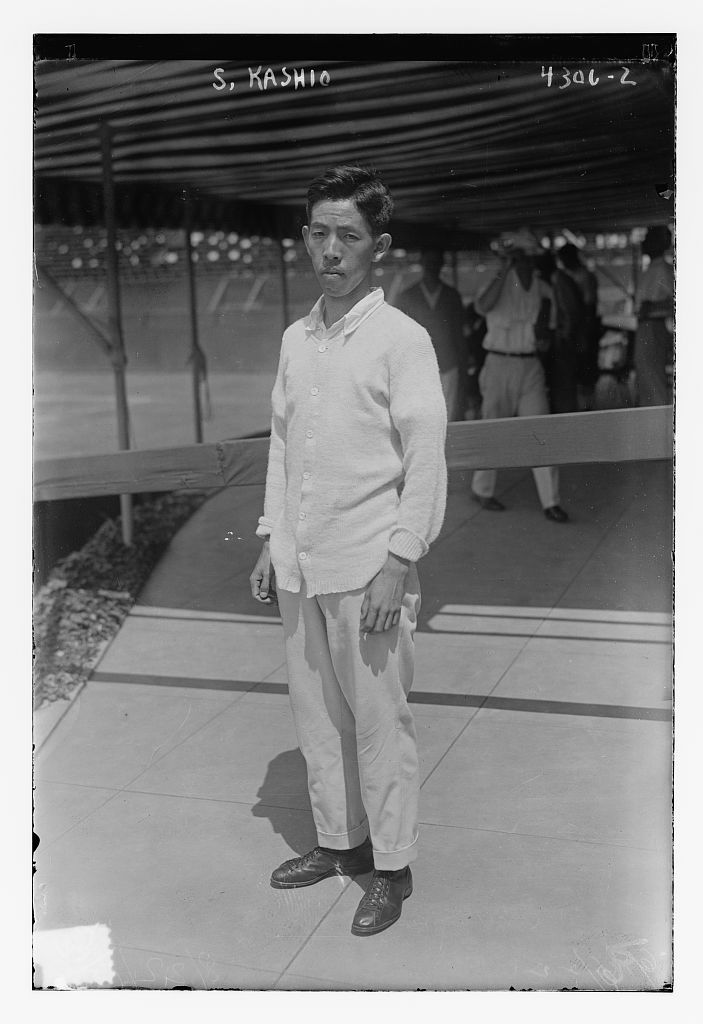
- Country (sports): Japan
- Born: January 2, 1892 Osaka, Japan
- Died: September 6, 1962 (aged 70) Palo Alto, California, US

Singles
- Career titles: 1 ATP

Medal record

Men's tennis

Representing Japan

Olympic Games
Silver medal – second place	1920 Antwerp	Doubles

Seiichiro Kashio (柏尾 誠一郎, Kashio Seiichirō; January 2, 1892 – September 6, 1962) was a tennis player from Japan, and with Ichiya Kumagae was one of the first Japanese Olympic medalists. He won the 1919 Canadian Open by defeating United States player Walter Wesbrook 3–6, 6–3, 6–1, 11–9.

== Biography ==
A native of Osaka, Kashio graduated from Tokyo Higher Commercial School (now Hitotsubashi University), and was subsequently employed by the trading company Mitsui & Co. and stationed at that company's New York City branch office. He competed in the 1918 US Open, finishing in the third round. He also participated in the 1919 US Open, finishing in the second round.

At the 1920 Summer Olympics held in Antwerp, Belgium, Kashio was defeated in the third round of the singles competition. However, paired with Ichiya Kumagae, he won the silver medal in the men's doubles event. In the doubles final, Kashio and Kumagae lost to Oswald Turnbull and Max Woosnam of Great Britain: 2–6, 7–5, 5–7, and 5–7.

Kashio was a member of the first Japan Davis Cup team, which finished as runner-up in the 1921 International Lawn Tennis Challenge. He subsequently partnered with Zenzo Shimizu in the 1923 Davis Cup, reaching the semi-finals. He appears to have retired from competition soon thereafter, and little is known of his subsequent career.
