= George Dodd (tennis) =

South African tennis player

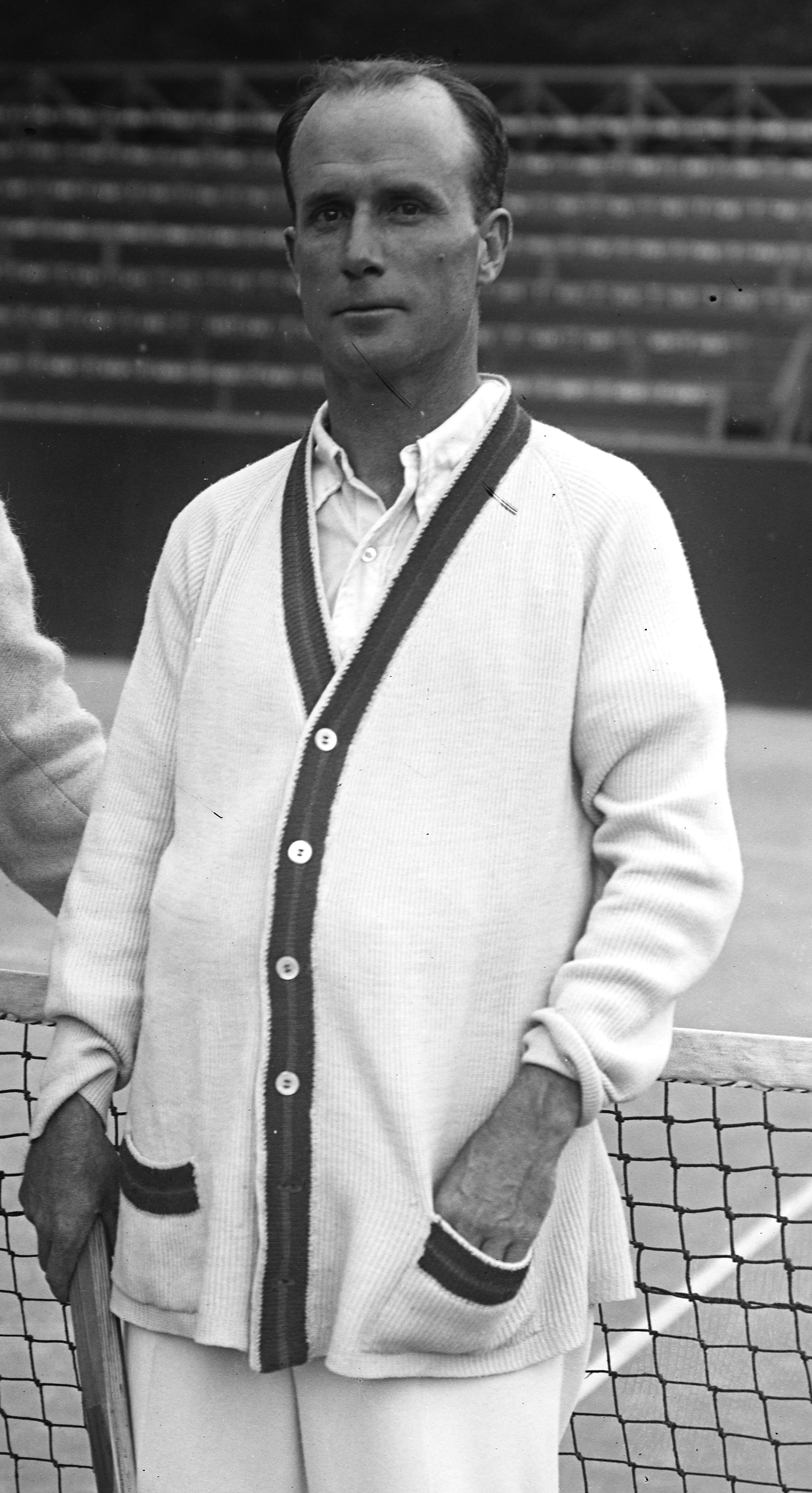
- Dodd (1920)
- Full name: George Henry Dodd
- Country (sports): South Africa
- Born: 16 January 1882 Kowie East, Port Alfred, Cape Colony
- Died: 21 July 1957 (aged 74) Durban, South Africa

Singles

Grand Slam singles results
- Wimbledon: 3R (1919, 1920)

George Henry Dodd (16 January 1882 – 21 July 1957) was a South African tennis player. George was the son of Douglas William Dodd, an Anglican minister from Eton, Buckinghamshire, and Elizabeth Saffrona (née Pruen). He competed for South Africa in the tennis event at the 1920 Summer Olympics where he took part in the men's singles and doubles events. In the singles competition, he reached the fourth round, in which he lost to Ichiya Kumagae in straight sets. In the doubles, he partnered with Cecil Blackbeard and reached the third round.

Dodd won the 1912 men's singles title at the South African Championships, defeating R.F. Le Sueur in the final in five sets. In addition, he was runner-up on five occasions (1914, 1922, 1925, 1928, 1929).

George was married thrice: his first marriage was to Grace Lilian Floquet (1887-1959) at St Mary's Anglican Church, Pretoria, on 10 August 1906. They divorced in Johannesburg on 25 January 1921. His second marriage was to Anna Catharina Margaretha Boshoff at the Johannesburg Magistrate's Court on 1 October 1921; this marriage also culminated in divorce on 26 October 1933 at Johannesburg. George's third and final marriage was to Agnes Ruth Joy Sackville-West (1903-1969), granddaughter of Lionel Sackville-West, 2nd Baron Sackville and Pepita de Oliva, on 15 October 1938 at the Johannesburg Magistrate's Court. They were married until his death on 21 July 1957. George died at the Durban sanatorium, his cause of death cited as congestive cardiac failure, uraemia and hypertensive disease. His widow, Ruth, went on to marry Samuel Wells Coutts of Benoni, son of John Alexander Coutts and Sarah Green.
