= Mino Balbi Di Robecco =

Italian tennis player

Balbi Di Robecco
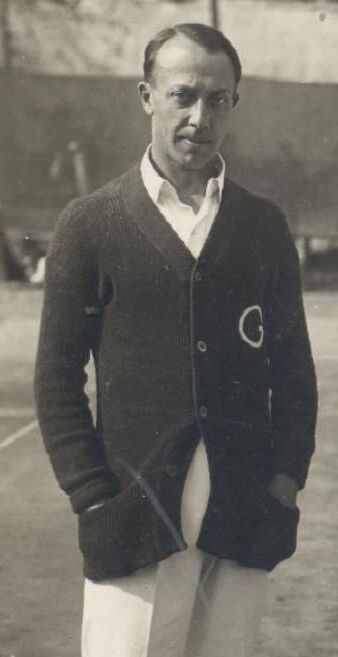

Personal information
- Born: 19 November 1883; Genoa, Genova, Italy
- Died: 23 November 1964 (aged 79); Genoa, Genova, Italy

Sport
- Sport: Tennis

Giovanni Mino Balbi Di Robecco (19 November 1885 – 23 November 1964) was an Italian tennis player. He represented Italy at the 1920 Summer Olympics, competing in the Men's singles event. Balbi Di Robecco also represented Italy at the 1922 Wimbledon Championships, competing in the Men's singles event and Men's Doubles event. In 1914, he won the Capri Watch Cup, a tennis tournament that is held annually in Italy.
