= Manuel Alonso Areizaga =

Spanish tennis player (1895–1984)

Manuel Alonso
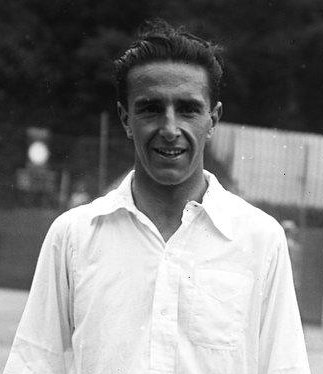
- Full name: Manuel Alonso de Areyzaga
- Country (sports): Spain
- Born: 12 November 1895 San Sebastián, Spain
- Died: 11 October 1984 (aged 88) Madrid, Spain
- Height: 1.75 m (5 ft 9 in)
- Turned pro: 1920 (amateur tour)
- Retired: 1938
- Plays: right-handed (one-handed backhand)
- Int. Tennis HoF: 1977 (member page)

Singles
- Highest ranking: No. 5 (1927, A. Wallis Myers)

Grand Slam singles results
- Wimbledon: F (1921^{(AC)})
- US Open: QF (1922, 1923, 1925, 1927)

Other tournaments
- WHCC: SF (1920)
- WCCC: 3R (1923)
- Olympic Games: QF (1920)

Other doubles tournaments
- Olympic Games: QF (1924)

Team competitions
- Davis Cup: F (1922)

Manuel Alonso de Areizaga (12 November 1895 – 11 October 1984) was a Spanish tennis player. He was the first Spanish tennis player of international stature.

== Biography ==
Alonso was born at San Sebastián on 12 November 1895. He won the Spanish tennis championships in 1915, 1919 and 1920. He frequently played doubles with his elder brother José María (b. 1890) who also was a successful tennis player.

In 1920, Alonso took part at the Summer Olympics at Antwerp. In singles, he reached the quarterfinals losing to British Noel Turnbull. In the same year, Alonso reached the semifinals at the World Hard Court Championships. At the 1924 Summer Olympics at Paris, Alonso reached the fourth round in singles.

In the early 1920s, Bill Tilden wrote about Alonso: "Seldom have I seen such wonderful natural abilities as are found in this young Spaniard...Alonzo has a terrific forehand drive that is the closest rival to W.M. Johnston's of any shot I have seen...His overhead is at once severe, deadly and reliable. He smashes with speed and direction. It is not only in his varied stroke equipment that Alonzo is great but in his marvellous footwork. Such speed of foot and lightning turning I have never before seen on a tennis court...I look to see Alonzo, who today loses matches through lack of resource, become by virtue of experience and tournament play the greatest player on the continent."

In 1921, at his first appearance at the Wimbledon Championships, Alonso made it to the all-comers final, losing to Brian Norton in five sets). He played at Wimbledon in 1922 and 1924 again, but couldn't repeat this success and dropped out of the competition in early rounds. From 1921 to 1925, Alonso was a member of the Spanish Davis Cup team and reached the final in 1922 partnering Manuel de Gomar. Both were called "Los Dos Manolos" ("the two Manuels"), a reference to the American "two Bills", "Big Bill" Tilden and "Little Bill" Johnston.

Alonso moved to the United States in 1923 which made him eligible for a U.S. ranking. He regularly played at the U.S. Championships until 1927 and reached the quarterfinals in 1922, 1923, 1925, and 1927. He was three years in the U.S. Top 10 (No. 4 in 1925 and 1927, No. 2 in 1926). In 1927, he was ranked world No. 5 by A. Wallis Myers of The Daily Telegraph. In 1931 and 1936, Alonso made two short appearances for his country in the Davis Cup again. Soon thereafter, he retired from tennis.

In 1977, Alonso was inducted into the Tennis Hall of Fame. He died on 11 October 1984 at Madrid.
