= Karel Ardelt =

Czech tennis player (1889–1978)

- Born: 28 January 1889; Písek, Austria-Hungary
- Died: 14 February 1978 (aged 89); Prague, Czechoslovakia

Karel Ardelt (Czech pronunciation: [ˈkarɛl ˈardɛlt], 28 January 1889 – 14 February 1978) was a Czech tennis player.

As a player for Bohemia, he was entered in two events in tennis at the 1912 Summer Olympics: outdoor singles and outdoor doubles (with Jiří Kodl) but did not play.

Ardelt competed for Czechoslovakia in two events in tennis at the 1920 Summer Olympics: singles and doubles (with Ladislav Žemla).

In the Davis Cup, he represented Czechoslovakia and lost five times.

== Other sources ==
- Evans, Hilary; Gjerde, Arild; Heijmans, Jeroen; Mallon, Bill; et al. "Karel Ardelt". Olympics at Sports-Reference.com. Sports Reference LLC. Archived from the original on 2 December 2016.
- Miloslav Trnka (15 January 2013). "Olympionik Karel Ardelt nepřišel na svět v Praze, ale v Písku" [Olympian Karel Ardelt wasn't born in Prague but in Písek] (PDF). Rodopisná revue (in Czech). Prague, Czech Republic: rodopisna-revue-online.tode.cz/.
- "Games at Wimbledon". The Evening Post. CIV (14). Wellington, New Zealand: Blundell Bros Limited: 11. 17 July 1922.
