= 1920 Wimbledon Championships =

- Date: 21 June – 3 July
- Edition: 40th
- Category: Grand Slam
- Surface: Grass
- Location: Worple Road; SW19, Wimbledon, London, United Kingdom
- Venue: All England Lawn Tennis and Croquet Club

Champions

Men's singles
- (United States) Bill Tilden

Women's singles
- (France) Suzanne Lenglen

Men's doubles
- (United States) Chuck Garland / (United States) R. Norris Williams

Women's doubles
- (France) Suzanne Lenglen / (United States) Elizabeth Ryan

Mixed doubles
- (Australia) Gerald Patterson / (France) Suzanne Lenglen
- Wimbledon Championships

The 1920 Wimbledon Championships took place on the outdoor grass courts at the All England Lawn Tennis and Croquet Club in Wimbledon, London, United Kingdom. The tournament ran from 21 June until 3 July. It was the 40th staging of the Wimbledon Championships, and the second Grand Slam tennis event of 1920.

== Finals ==
=== Men's singles ===
(United States) Bill Tilden defeated (Australia) Gerald Patterson 2–6, 6–3, 6–2, 6–4

=== Women's singles ===
(France) Suzanne Lenglen defeated (United Kingdom) Dorothea Lambert Chambers 6–3, 6–0

=== Men's doubles ===
(United States) Chuck Garland / (United States) R. Norris Williams defeated (United Kingdom) Algernon Kingscote / (United Kingdom) James Cecil Parke 4–6, 6–4, 7–5, 6–2

=== Women's doubles ===
(France) Suzanne Lenglen / (United States) Elizabeth Ryan defeated (United Kingdom) Dorothea Lambert Chambers / (United Kingdom) Ethel Larcombe 6–4, 6–0

=== Mixed doubles ===
(Australia) Gerald Patterson / (France) Suzanne Lenglen defeated (Australia) Randolph Lycett / (United States) Elizabeth Ryan 7–5, 6–3

Preceded by 1920 Australasian Championships	Grand Slams	Succeeded by 1920 U.S. National Championships
