= José María Alonso =

Spanish tennis player (1890–1979)

José María Alonso de Areyzaga
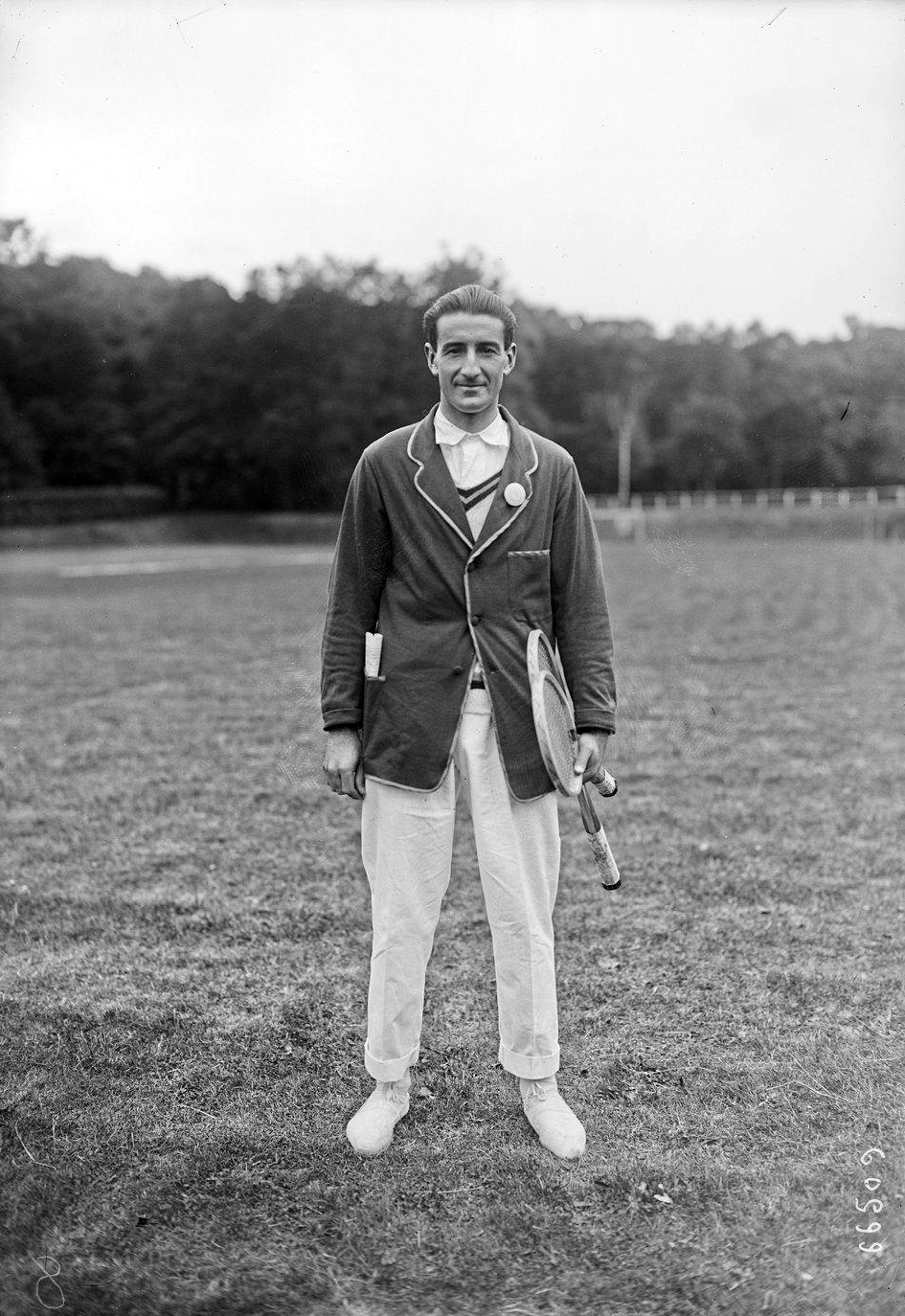
- Country (sports): Spain
- Born: 28 March 1890 San Sebastián, Spain
- Died: 14 March 1979 (aged 88) Córdoba, Argentina

Singles

Grand Slam singles results
- Wimbledon: 2R (1922)

Other tournaments
- Olympic Games: 1R (1920)

Doubles

Grand Slam doubles results
- Wimbledon: QF (1924)
- Olympic Games: QF (1924)

Grand Slam mixed doubles results
- Wimbledon: 1R (1924)

José María Alonso de Areyzaga (28 March 1890 – 14 March 1979) was a Spanish male tennis player. He competed in the singles event at the 1920 Summer Olympics in which he lost in the first round to Ichiya Kumagae. With his brother Manuel Alonso, he competed in the men's doubles event at the 1924 Summer Olympics and reached the quarterfinal. With his brother he reached the quarterfinal of the doubles event at the 1924 Wimbledon Championships.
