= James Cecil Parke =

Irish tennis player

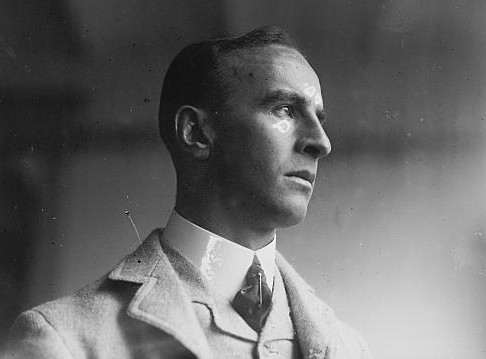
- Country (sports): (United Kingdom of Great Britain and Ireland) Great Britain and Ireland
- Born: 26 July 1881 Clones, County Monaghan, Ireland
- Died: 27 February 1946 (aged 64) Llandudno, Conwy, Wales
- Turned pro: 1900 (amateur tour)
- Retired: 1925
- Plays: Right-handed (one-handed backhand)

Singles
- Career record: 193–40 (82.83%)
- Career titles: 31
- Highest ranking: No. 1 (1914, P.A. Vaile)

Grand Slam singles results
- Australian Open: W (1912)
- Wimbledon: SF (1910, 1913)

Grand Slam doubles results
- Australian Open: W (1912)
- Wimbledon: F (1920)

Grand Slam mixed doubles results
- Wimbledon: W (1914)

Team competitions
- Davis Cup: W (1912)

Rugby union career
- Position: Centre
Amateur team(s)
Years	Team	Apps	(Points)
–	Monkstown		
–	DUFC		
Senior career
Years	Team	Apps	(Points)
1901–1908	Leinster	10	
- Correct as of 30 January 2021
International career
Years	Team	Apps	(Points)
1903–1909	Ireland	20	(36)
- Correct as of 8 February 2021
Medal record
Representing Great Britain
Tennis, Summer Olympics
Silver medal – second place	1908 London	Outdoor doubles

James Cecil Parke (26 July 1881 – 27 February 1946) was an Irish rugby union player, tennis player, golfer, solicitor and World War I veteran. He became an Olympic silver medallist, Davis Cup champion, Wimbledon Mixed Doubles winner and Australasian Championships winner in both Singles and Doubles. He has often been referred to as Ireland's greatest ever sportsman.

== Early life ==
James Parke was born in the town of Clones located in County Monaghan, Ireland. He was one of eight children to Emily (née Pringle) and William Parke. When he was nine years old, Parke played for his hometown's chess team. He attended the Portora Royal School in Enniskillen and after graduation he attended Trinity college to study law. Having been a part of the Irish golf team in 1906, Parke was also considered a top-class track and field sprinter and a cricketer.

== Rugby career ==
From 1901 to 1908, Parke played on the rugby teams of Monkstown, Dublin University. He also played on the provincial level for Leinster. Between 1903 and 1909, he also played in twenty games for the Irish national team. Parke captained Ireland on three occasions. He helped Ireland win two of their three 1906 Home Nations matches, resulting in a shared championship with Wales. In his final international cap, Parke kicked a penalty and a conversion to help seal a 19–8 victory in Ireland's first match against France.

== Tennis career ==
As a tennis player, Parke was a baseliner whose best shot was a running down-the-line forehand. Through his career, Parke achieved a number of feats. Having already become the European singles champion in 1907, Parke later won a silver medal in the 1908 Olympics in men's doubles, the Australian men's singles and doubles tennis titles in 1912, and the Wimbledon mixed doubles title in 1914. He won eight Irish Lawn Tennis Singles titles, four doubles and two mixed titles. Parke was ranked world No. 4 in both 1913 and 1920 by A. Wallis Myers of The Daily Telegraph. He was described as having the strongest claim to the "championships of the world" by P.A. Vaile for the 1914 season.

Having already played in the Davis Cup (then known as the International Lawn Tennis Challenge), he defeated Norman Brookes and Rodney Heath in the Challenge Round on 28–30 November 1912, helping the British Isles capture the Cup in one of his greatest accomplishments. The following year he beat Maurice McLoughlin and Richard Norris Williams in the Challenge Round on 25–28 July 1913. However, the British Isles lost the meeting against the USA. Parke wore a four-leaved shamrock during every match he played.

== Military ==
Just after the outbreak of World War 1, Parke was commissioned in the Leinster Regiment (Royal Canadians) with the rank of lieutenant. With a temporary promotion to captain, he transferred to the Essex Regiment in mid-1916. In 1917 and 1918 he served as a temporary major on two separate occasions. During the war, he was wounded twice, at Gallipoli and on the Western front. Parke resigned his commission on 5 May 1920, with the retired rank of major.

== Personal life ==
Parke married Sybil Smith in 1918 and moved to her hometown of Llandudno, Wales in 1920 where he joined Chamberlain and Johnson law practice. He died in Llandudno in 1946 following a heart attack.

== Grand Slam finals ==
=== Singles: 1 title ===
Result	Year	Championship	Surface	Opponent	Score
Win	1912	Australasian Championships	Grass	(United Kingdom) Alfred Beamish	3–6, 6–3, 1–6, 6–1, 7–5

=== Doubles: 2 (1 title, 1 runner-up) ===
Result	Year	Championship	Surface	Partner	Opponents	Score
Win	1912	Australasian Championships	Grass	(United Kingdom) Charles Dixon	(United Kingdom) Alfred Beamish (United Kingdom) Gordon Lowe	6–4, 6–4, 6–2
Loss	1920	Wimbledon	Grass	(United Kingdom) Algernon Kingscote	(United States) Chuck Garland (United States) R. Norris Williams	6–4, 4–6, 5–7, 2–6

=== Mixed doubles: 2 (1 title, 1 runner-up) ===
Result	Year	Championship	Surface	Partner	Opponents	Score
Loss	1913	Wimbledon	Grass	(United Kingdom) Ethel Thomson Larcombe	(United Kingdom) Agnes Tuckey (United Kingdom) Hope Crisp	6–3, 3–5 retired
Win	1914	Wimbledon	Grass	(United Kingdom) Ethel Thomson Larcombe	(France) Marguerite Broquedis (New Zealand) Anthony Wilding	4–6, 6–4, 6–2

== See also ==
- Frank Stoker
