= Hans Syz =

Swiss tennis player (1891–1954)

- Full name: Hans Georg Syz
- Country (sports): Switzerland
- Born: 15 October 1891 Alameda, California, U.S.
- Died: 23 December 1954 (aged 63) Zürich, Switzerland

Hans Georg Syz (15 October 1891 – 23 December 1954) was an American-born Swiss tennis player. He represented Switzerland at the 1920 Summer Olympics and in the 1924 Summer Olympics.

== Personal life ==
On 23 March 1916, Syz married Emilie Irene Louise "Lili" von Ramberg (1888–1978), daughter of Günther Franz Oskar von Ramberg (1850–1907) and Martha von Ramberg (née Spalding; 1852–1918). Her paternal grandfather was Arthur von Ramberg. They had two children;

- Isabel Maria Syz (1917–2011), married Edmund Friedrich Schulthess (1914–2002),
- Hans A. Syz (1921–1985), married Raymonde Abegg (1934–2021), a great-granddaughter of Carl Abegg-Arter, with whom he had seven children.

Syz died 23 December 1954 in Zurich, Switzerland.
