= Alfred Beamish =

British tennis player

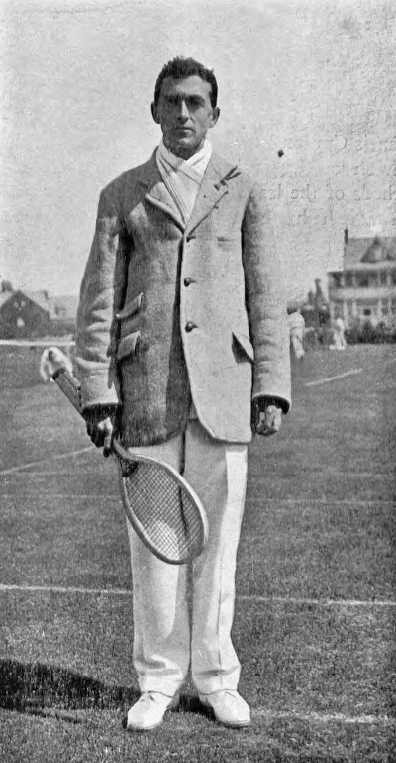
- Full name: Alfred Ernest Beamish
- Country (sports): United Kingdom
- Born: 6 August 1879; Richmond, London, England
- Died: 28 February 1944 (aged 64)
- Turned pro: 1903 (amateur tour)
- Retired: 1921

Singles

Grand Slam singles results
- Australian Open: F (1912)
- Wimbledon: SF (1912, 1914)

Other tournaments
- WCCC: F (1921)
- Olympic Games: 1R (1912)

Doubles

Grand Slam doubles results
- Australian Open: F (1912)
Medal record
Olympic Games
Bronze medal – third place	1912 Stockholm	Men's indoor doubles

Alfred Ernest Beamish (6 August 1879 – 28 February 1944) was a British tennis player born in Richmond, Surrey, England. He finished as runner-up to James Cecil Parke in the Men's Singles final of the Australasian Championships, the future Australian Open in 1912. Beamish also partnered with Charles Dixon to win the bronze medal in the indoor doubles event at the 1912 Stockholm Olympics. He was the runner-up in one of tennis's early majors, the World Covered Court Championship in 1921. He competed at the 1920 Summer Olympics. He was also twice a semifinalist at Wimbledon in 1912 (where he beat Gordon Lowe before losing to Arthur Gore) and 1914 (where he lost to Norman Brookes). Beamish was married to Wimbledon singles semi-finalist Winifred Beamish.

== Grand Slam finals ==
=== Singles (1 runner-up) ===
Result	Year	Championship	Surface	Opponent	Score
Loss	1912	Australasian Championships	Grass	(United Kingdom) James Cecil Parke	6–3, 3–6, 6–1, 1–6, 5–7

=== Doubles (1 runner-up) ===
Result	Year	Championship	Surface	Partner	Opponents	Score
Loss	1912	Australasian Championships	Grass	(United Kingdom) Gordon Lowe	(United Kingdom) James Cecil Parke (United Kingdom) Charles Dixon	6–4, 6–4, 6–2

== World Championships finals ==
=== Singles (1 runner-up) ===
Result	Year	Championship	Surface	Opponent	Score
Loss	1921	World Covered Court Championships	Wood	(France) William Laurentz	2–6, 4–6, 2–6
