= Louis Raymond (tennis) =

South African tennis player (1895–1962)

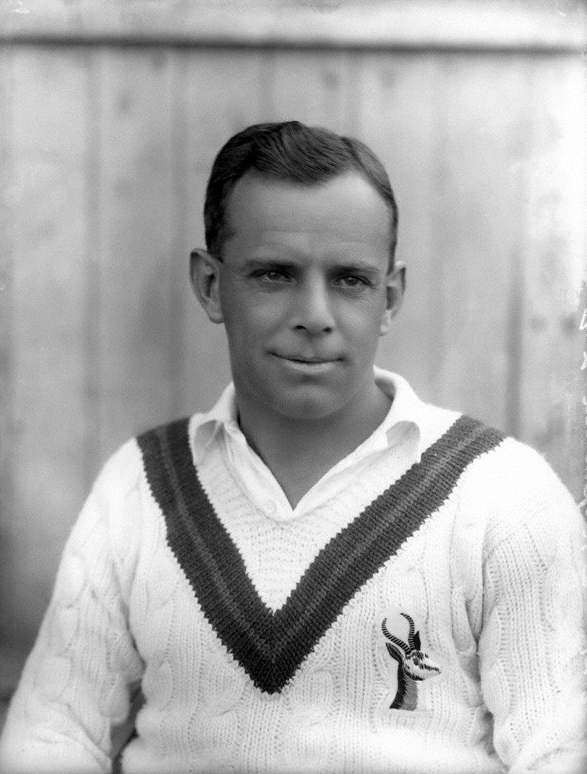
- Full name: Louis Bosman Raymond
- Country (sports): South Africa
- Born: 28 June 1895 Pretoria, South African Republic
- Died: 30 January 1962 (aged 66) Johannesburg, South Africa
- Plays: Left-handed (1-handed backhand)

Singles
- Career record: 14–8

Grand Slam singles results
- French Open: QF (1927)
- Wimbledon: SF (1924)

Other tournaments
- WHCC: QF (1920)

Doubles

Grand Slam doubles results
- Wimbledon: SF (1924, 1927)

Grand Slam mixed doubles results
- Wimbledon: SF (1927)

Team competitions
- Davis Cup: SF (1919)
Medal record
Olympic Games – Tennis
Gold medal – first place	1920 Antwerp	Singles

Louis Bosman Raymond (28 June 1895 – 30 January 1962) was a male tennis player from South Africa.

== Career ==
At the 1920 Summer Olympics in Antwerp, Belgium, he defeated Ichiya Kumagai in the finals to win the gold medal.

He won the South African Championships six times; four consecutive titles from 1921 through 1924, as well as victories in 1930 and 1931.

In 1924, he made it to the semifinal of the singles event at the Wimbledon Championships, losing to eventual champion Jean Borotra in straight sets. In 1927 he reached the quarterfinal of the French Championship in which he was defeated by Bill Tilden.

Between 1919 and 1931, Raymond played in ten ties for the South African Davis Cup team, with a record of ten wins and eleven losses.

In Tilden's book, The Art of Lawn Tennis, Raymond is described as a "hard working and deserving player" and someone who "attains success by industry rather than natural talent".
