= Jean Washer =

Belgian tennis player

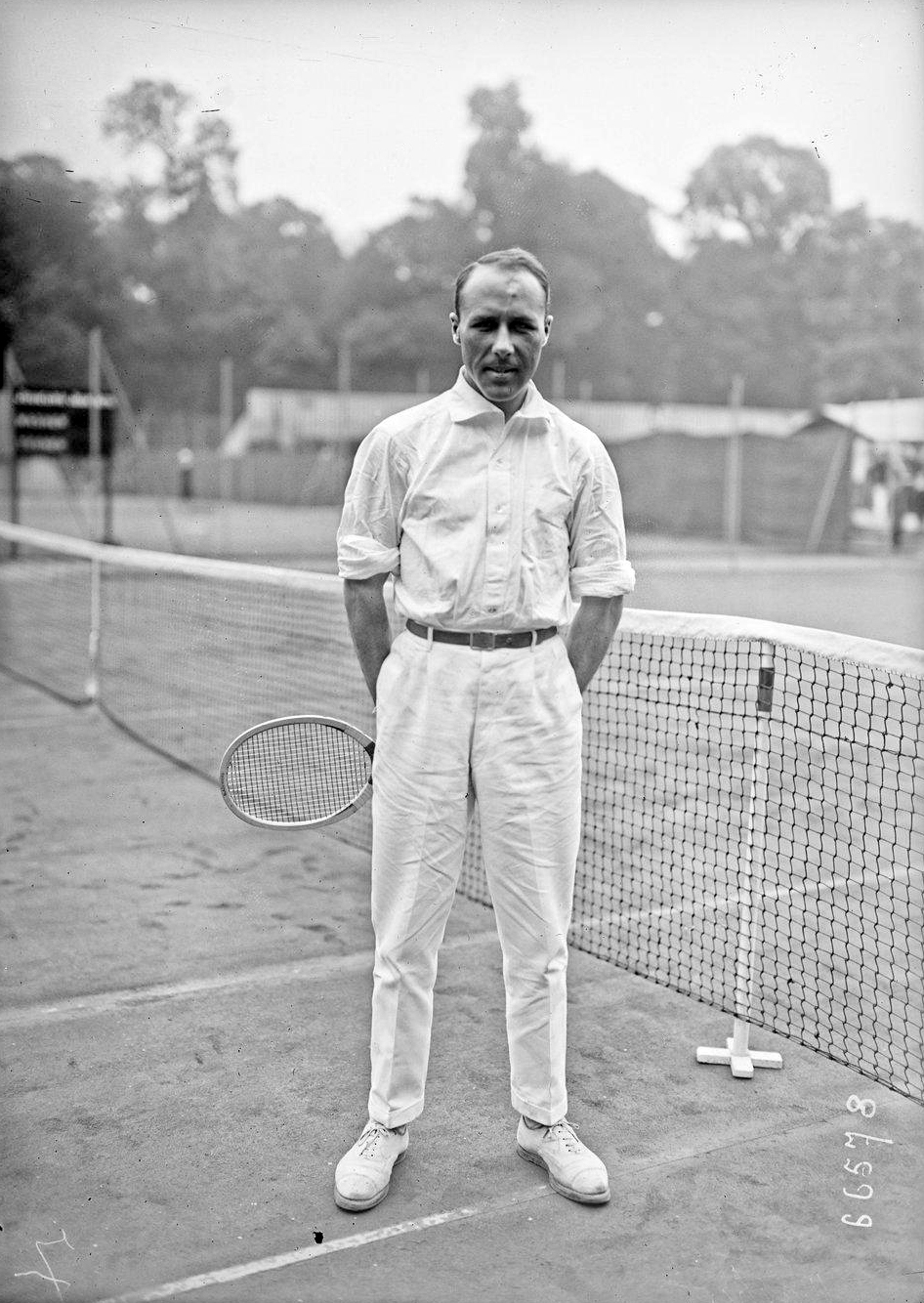
- Full name: Jean Marie Octave Constant Washer
- Country (sports): Belgium
- Born: 22 August 1894 Berchem, Antwerp, Belgium
- Died: 23 March 1972 (aged 77) Geneva, Switzerland
- Plays: Left-handed (one-handed backhand)

Singles
- Career record: 15–7
- Highest ranking: No. 9 (1923, A. Wallis Myers)

Grand Slam singles results
- French Open: SF (1925)
- Wimbledon: QF (1924)
- US Open: 3R (1927)

Other tournaments
- WHCC: F (1921, 1923)

Team competitions
- Davis Cup: QF (1921)

Jean Marie Octave Constant Washer (French pronunciation: [ʒɑ̃ waʃe]; 22 August 1894 – 23 March 1972) was a Belgian tennis player successful in the 1920s. He was the father of Philippe Washer.

== Tennis career ==
Washer reached the final of the World Hard Court championships (the precursor to the French championships) in 1921, beating Jean Borotra in the quarterfinals. He lost the final in straight sets to Bill Tilden. The correspondent from Le Sport universel illustré summed up the Belgian by saying "Washer is one of the most conscientious players in existence. Solid, robust, he reminds me completely of one of the best forwards in the world of rugby". The article went on to describe the final and said Washer had a "very good forehand" and made a "better showing than the result seems to indicate, because he obliged the great Tilden to work hard". In 1923 he reached the final again, beating Henri Cochet in five sets. "The Belgian attacked with magnificent brilliance" and his service "began to annoy Cochet too". Washer lost the final in five sets to Bill Johnston. He reached the semifinals of Roland Garros in 1925, beating Cochet in the quarter finals. Cochet had lost five times to that point against Washer and had not beaten him. Washer won the match with a fast and powerful drive. Washer lost to Jean Borotra in the semifinals. Washer also reached the French quarterfinals in 1926 as well as at the 1924 Wimbledon Championships.

He was ranked world No. 9 by A. Wallis Myers of The Daily Telegraph for 1923.

== World Championships finals ==
=== Singles (2 runner-ups) ===
Result	Year	Championship	Surface	Opponent	Score
Loss	1921	World Hard Court Championships	Clay	(United States) Bill Tilden	3–6, 3–6, 3–6
Loss	1923	World Hard Court Championships	Clay	(United States) Bill Johnston	6–4, 2–6, 2–6, 6–4, 3–6
