= Noel Turnbull =

British tennis player

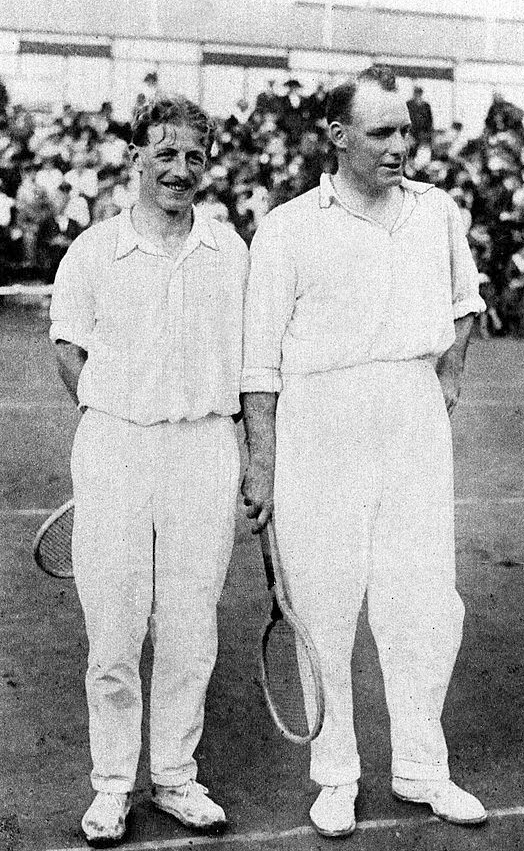
- Noel Turnbull (right) and Max Woosnam at the 1920 Olympics

Personal information
- Born: 20 December 1890 Highgate, London, Great Britain
- Died: 17 December 1970 (aged 79) Whitby, North Yorkshire, England

Sport
- Sport: Tennis
Medal record
Representing United Kingdom
Olympic Games
Gold medal – first place	1920 Antwerp	Doubles

Oswald Graham Noel Turnbull MC (20 December 1890 – 17 December 1970) was an English tennis player. He is best known for his gold medal in the men's doubles event (with Maxwell Woosnam) at the 1920 Antwerp Olympics.

Before World War I, Turnbull worked at the family firm of ship-owners. During the war, he served as a driver and, during the Battle of the Somme, won the Military Cross. In 1919 he had his first major tennis tournament, the Davis Cup. In 1921, he played again in the Cup and won the singles at the Portuguese Championships, but then disappeared from tennis for four years to focus on golf. In 1926, he returned to the Davis Cup, and in 1928, again won the singles at the Portuguese Championships.
