= 1921 U.S. National Championships – Women's singles =

Women's singles
- 1921 U.S. National Championships

Final
- Champion: (United States) Molla Mallory
- Runner-up: (United States) Mary Browne
- Score: 4–6, 6–4, 6–2

Details
- Draw: 64
- Seeds: –

Events
Singles	men	women
Doubles	men	women
← 1920 ·	U.S. National Championships	· 1922 →

Molla Mallory defeated Mary Browne 4–6, 6–4, 6–2 in the final to win the women's singles tennis title at the 1921 U.S. National Championships. The women's event was organized for the first time at the West Side Tennis Club, Forest Hills, New York City and was held from August 15 through August 20, 1921. It was Mallory's sixth U.S. National singles title. In the second round of the event, Mallory defeated Suzanne Lenglen for the only time in her career. Suzanne Lenglen was making her only ever competitive appearance in the United States. She retired from the match after losing the first set, the only competitive loss after World War I of her career.

== Draw ==
=== Final eight ===
Quarterfinals
(United States) Patricia Hitchins	8	6
(United States) Adelaide Greene	6	2
(United States) Ann Cole	1	2
(United States) Mary Browne	6	6
(United States) Helene Falk	2	1
(United States) Molla Mallory	6	6
(United States) May Sutton Bundy	6	6
(United States) Helen Gilleaudeau	1	2

Semifinals
(United States) Patricia Hitchins	3	0
(United States) Mary Browne	6	6
(United States) Molla Mallory	8	6
(United States) May Sutton Bundy	6	2

Finals
(United States) Mary Browne	6	4	2
(United States) Molla Mallory	4	6	6

Preceded by 1921 Wimbledon Championships – Women's singles	Grand Slam women's singles	Succeeded by 1922 Australasian Championships – Women's singles
