= 1921 World Hard Court Championships – Women's doubles =

Women's doubles
- 1921 World Hard Court Championships

Final
- Champions: (France) Germaine Golding (France) Suzanne Lenglen
- Runners-up: (United Kingdom) Dorothy Holman (South Africa) Irene Peacock
- Score: 6–2, 6–2

Events
Singles	men	women
Doubles	men	women	mixed
- World Hard Court Championships

The women's doubles was one of five events at the 1921 World Hard Court Championships. Dorothy Holman and Phyllis Satterthwaite were the title holders. Holman paired with Irene Peacock this year, but lost to Germaine Golding and Suzanne Lenglen 6–2, 6–2 in the final.

== Draw ==
Key

- Q = Qualifier
- WC = Wild card
- LL = Lucky loser
- Alt = Alternate
- ITF = ITF entry
- PR = Protected ranking
- SR = Special ranking
- SE = Special exempt
- JE = Junior exempt
- JR = Junior Accelerator Programme entrant
- CO = College Accelerator Programme entrant
- NG = Next Gen Accelerator Program entrant
- w/o = Walkover
- r = Retired
- d = Defaulted

=== Draw ===
1st round
(France) Germaine Golding (France) Suzanne Lenglen	6	6
(United States) Molla Mallory (United States) Edith Sigourney	4	1
(France) Marguerite Billout (France) Daisy Speranza
?
?
(France) Genevieve Cousin (France) Suzanne Devé
?
(France) Marie Conquet (France) Marie Danet
(United Kingdom) Miss Lammin (France) Nanette le Besnerais
?
?
?
?
(Belgium) Anne de Borman (Belgium) Marie Storms
?
(United Kingdom) Dorothy Holman (South Africa) Irene Peacock

2nd round
(France) Germaine Golding (France) Suzanne Lenglen	6	6
(France) Marguerite Billout (France) Daisy Speranza	1	0
(France) Genevieve Cousin (France) Suzanne Devé	6	2	6
(France) Marie Conquet (France) Marie Danet	2	6	4
(United Kingdom) Miss Lammin (France) Nanette le Besnerais
?
(Belgium) Anne de Borman (Belgium) Marie Storms	6	4	6
(United Kingdom) Dorothy Holman (South Africa) Irene Peacock	2	6	8

Semifinals
(France) Germaine Golding (France) Suzanne Lenglen	6	6
(France) Genevieve Cousin (France) Suzanne Devé	1	0
(United Kingdom) Miss Lammin (France) Nanette le Besnerais	2	4
(United Kingdom) Dorothy Holman (South Africa) Irene Peacock	6	6

Finals
(France) Germaine Golding (France) Suzanne Lenglen	6	6
(United Kingdom) Dorothy Holman (South Africa) Irene Peacock	2	2
