= 1921 World Hard Court Championships – Women's singles =

Women's singles
- 1921 World Hard Court Championships

Final
- Champion: (France) Suzanne Lenglen
- Runner-up: (United States) Molla Mallory
- Score: 6–2, 6–3

Details
- Draw: 32

Events
Singles	men	women
Doubles	men	women	mixed
← 1920 ·	World Hard Court Championships	· 1922 →

The women's singles was one of five events of the 1921 World Hard Court Championships tennis tournament held in Paris, France from 28 May until 5 June 1921. The draw consisted of 22 players. Dorothy Holman was the title holder, but she lost in the second round to Jeanne Vaussard. Suzanne Lenglen defeated Molla Mallory in the final for her second World Hard Court Championship title. Lenglen had won the tournament in 1914 and would win the next two editions in 1922 and 1923 as well.

== Draw ==
=== Key ===
- Q = Qualifier
- WC = Wild card
- LL = Lucky loser
- Alt = Alternate
- SE = Special exempt
- PR = Protected ranking
- ITF = ITF entry
- JE = Junior exempt
- w/o = Walkover
- r = Retired
- d = Defaulted
- SR = Special ranking

=== Finals ===
Semifinals
(United States) Molla Mallory	8	6
(France) Marguerite Broquedis	6	4
(South Africa) Irene Bowder Peacock	0	1
(France) Suzanne Lenglen	6	6

Final
(United States) Molla Mallory	2	3
(France) Suzanne Lenglen	6	6

=== Top half ===
First round
(United States) Molla Mallory	6	6
(France) Blanche Amblard	1	1
(France) Jeanne Vaussard	6	6
(Greece) Hélène Contostavlos	1	4
(Belgium) Marie Storms	3	4
(United Kingdom) Dorothy Holman	6	6

Second round
(United States) Molla Mallory	7	6
(France) Yvonne Bourgeois	5	4
(France) Jeanne Vaussard	6	6
(United Kingdom) Dorothy Holman	3	3
(France) Daisy Speranza	1	3
(France) Germaine Golding	6	6
(France) Suzanne Amblard	4	1
(France) Marguerite Broquedis	6	6

Quarterfinals
(United States) Molla Mallory	6	6
(France) Jeanne Vaussard	2	2
(France) Germaine Golding	3	6	2
(France) Marguerite Broquedis	6	3	6

Semifinals
(United States) Molla Mallory	8	6
(France) Marguerite Broquedis	6	4

=== Bottom half ===
First round
(South Africa) Irene Bowder Peacock	4	6	6
(France) Nanette le Besnerais	6	1	2
(United States) Eleanora Sears
(France) Marie Conquet	d
(France) Marie Danet	4	3
(United States) Edith Sigourney	6	6

Second round
(South Africa) Irene Bowder Peacock	6	6
(France) Marie Conquet	3	3
(France) Genevieve Cousin	3	6	6
(United States) Edith Sigourney	6	4	3
(United Kingdom) Dorothy Lammin	4	1
(France) Suzanne Dévé	6	6
(Belgium) Anne de Borman	0	0
(France) Suzanne Lenglen	6	6

Quarterfinals
(South Africa) Irene Bowder Peacock	7	6
(France) Genevieve Cousin	5	4
(France) Suzanne Dévé	0	0
(France) Suzanne Lenglen	6	6

Semifinals
(South Africa) Irene Bowder Peacock	0	1
(France) Suzanne Lenglen	6	6
