= Lenglen–Mallory match at the 1921 U.S. National Championships =

Tennis match

1921 U.S. National Championship second-round match
- (United States) Molla Mallory vs. (France) Suzanne Lenglen
Set	1	2
(United States) Molla Mallory	6	0
(France) Suzanne Lenglen	2	0 (Note: (ret. two points into the first game))
- Date: August 16, 1921
- Tournament: U.S. National Championships
- Location: West Side Tennis Club; Forest Hills, New York
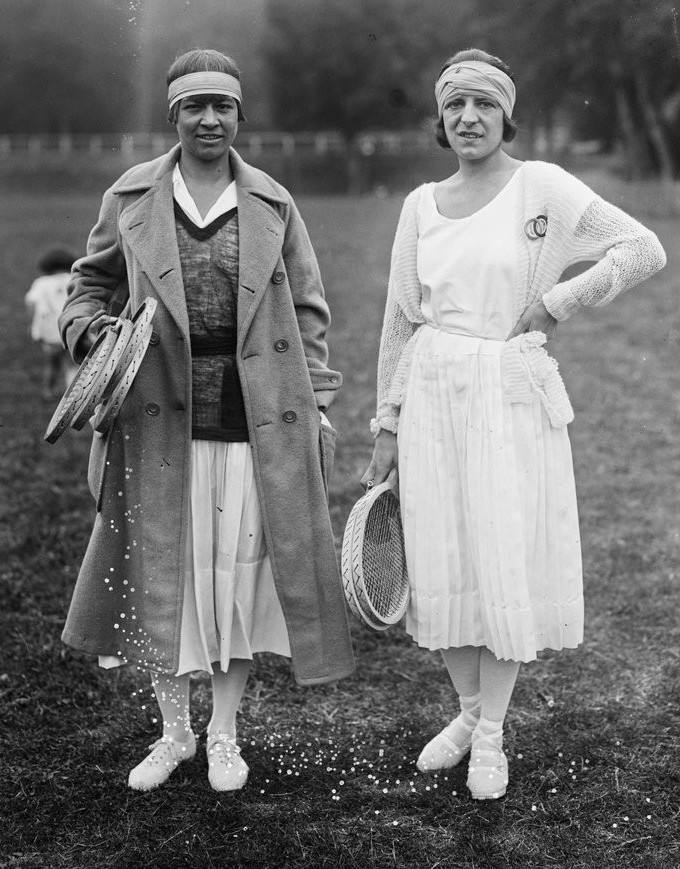
- Mallory (left) and Lenglen (right)

The Lenglen–Mallory match at the 1921 U.S. National Championships was a second-round match between French tennis player Suzanne Lenglen and American tennis player Molla Mallory at the 1921 U.S. National Championships, an amateur tournament that has since become one of the four modern professional Grand Slam tournaments. Mallory defeated Lenglen in the match, with Lenglen retiring from the match in the first game of the second set after losing the first set. It was Lenglen's only competitive amateur loss after World War I, and her only competitive amateur match in the United States during her career.

Lenglen had entered the match on a 108-match win streak, including one victory over Mallory, a five-time U.S. National champion in singles. Following the loss, she withdrew from all other competitive events on the remainder of her United States tour, including the doubles event at the same venue (which she had entered with Mallory) and the mixed doubles event a few weeks later at Longwood Cricket Club in Brookline, Massachusetts. Lenglen did not play another competitive match until March 1922, at which point she began an all-time record 179-match win streak that was intact when she retired from competitive tennis in 1926. During this win streak, she defeated Mallory two more times to establish herself as the better player as viewed by the media and tennis historians. A professional tour in the United States that began in 1926 helped further restore her reputation outside of Europe.

The match was enshrouded in controversy over Lenglen's health during the match. Lenglen had been sick with bronchitis in the lead-up to the match back in France and it is unclear whether she was in better health by the time of the match. She retired in the match after coughing repeatedly up to that point. Although the French Tennis Federation (FFT) accepted Lenglen's statement that she had still been ill, the FFT vice president resigned in disagreement, having seen Lenglen's condition at the match. The American media did not accept that Lenglen was in bad health either, accusing her of making an excuse for losing and coining the phrase "cough and quit" to describe her attitude. Another more minor controversy was the United States Lawn Tennis Association (USLTA) not providing her with alcohol during the match, which they had promised in spite of Prohibition.

== Background ==
Suzanne Lenglen was regarded as the best women's tennis player in the world in 1921, having won the World Hard Court Championships in her first two appearances and the Wimbledon Championships in her first three appearances. She was 22 years old and had entered this match on a 108-match win streak. Molla Mallory was considered the best American women's tennis player, having won the U.S. National Championships in five of the previous six years. Mallory, who was 37 years old and originally from Norway, had been sent to compete in Europe for the first time since her triumphs in the United States by the United States Lawn Tennis Association (USLTA), who had hoped that Lenglen would return the favor and compete in America. During this trip, Lenglen defeated Mallory in their only meeting at the 1921 World Hard Court Championships in France.

Lenglen had been interested in competing at the 1921 U.S. National Championships to prove that she deserved to be called a world champion. Her father opposed the idea because he could not accompany Lenglen across the ocean due to his poor health. Although the French Tennis Federation did not have the funds to send Lenglen to the United States, American philanthropist Anne Morgan agreed to cover her expenses in exchange for her playing exhibition matches in support of the American Committee for Devastated France. This committee was founded by Morgan to provide relief for parts of France still recovering from World War I. As another stipulation, Lenglen agreed to the trip in part because the USLTA had promised to provide her with alcohol in spite of prohibition laws in the United States at the time. At this point in her career, she had become accustomed to drinking cognac during her more important matches. Lenglen was scheduled to begin her trip on July 30 and arrive in time to play in tournaments beginning on August 3, two weeks before the U.S. National Championships. However, bronchitis delayed her trip twice. She did not leave France until August 6 and did not make it to New York until August 13, three days before her opening match. She was still sick when she arrived.

== Match details ==
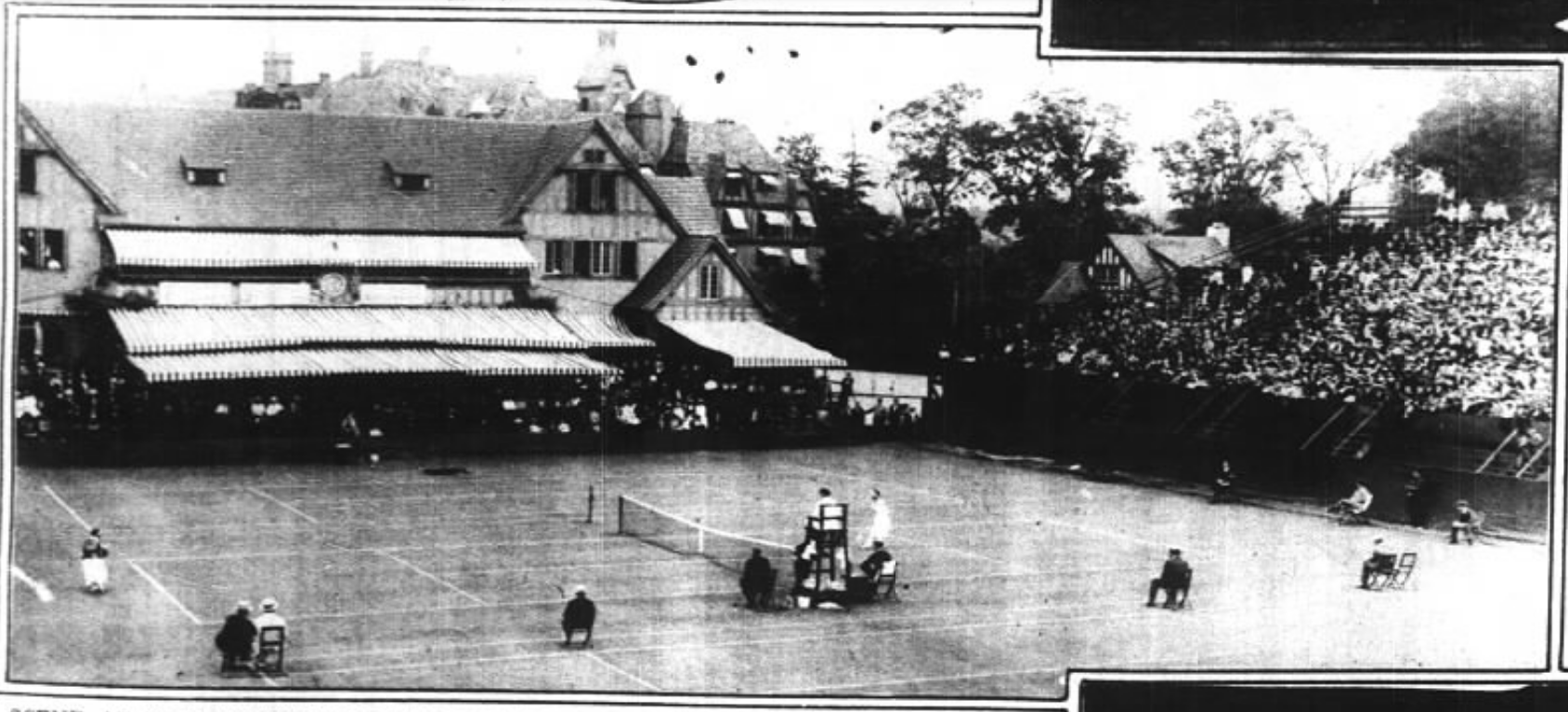
Lenglen (far court) and Mallory (near court) contesting the 1921 U.S. National Championship second-round match

The unseeded draw at the U.S. National Championships placed Lenglen in a first-round match against Eleanor Goss followed by a second round match against Mallory if both players won their opening matches. After Goss defaulted, tournament officials rescheduled the match between Lenglen and Mallory to be held that night to appease the large crowd that showed up to see Lenglen play. Journalists at the time reported that Goss likely defaulted on purpose so that Lenglen would have to face Mallory without having played a competitive match since Wimbledon six weeks earlier. With over 8,000 people in attendance, Mallory took a 2–0 lead in the first set before Lenglen began coughing in the third game. Lenglen recovered to win two of the next three games before Mallory took the last four games and the set. Aside from her coughing, Lenglen was also distraught over the USLTA not fulfilling their promise to provide her with alcohol during the match. After a lost rally and a double fault to start the second set, Lenglen retired from the match. This was the only singles loss of Lenglen's career following World War I.

== Remainder of the United States tour ==
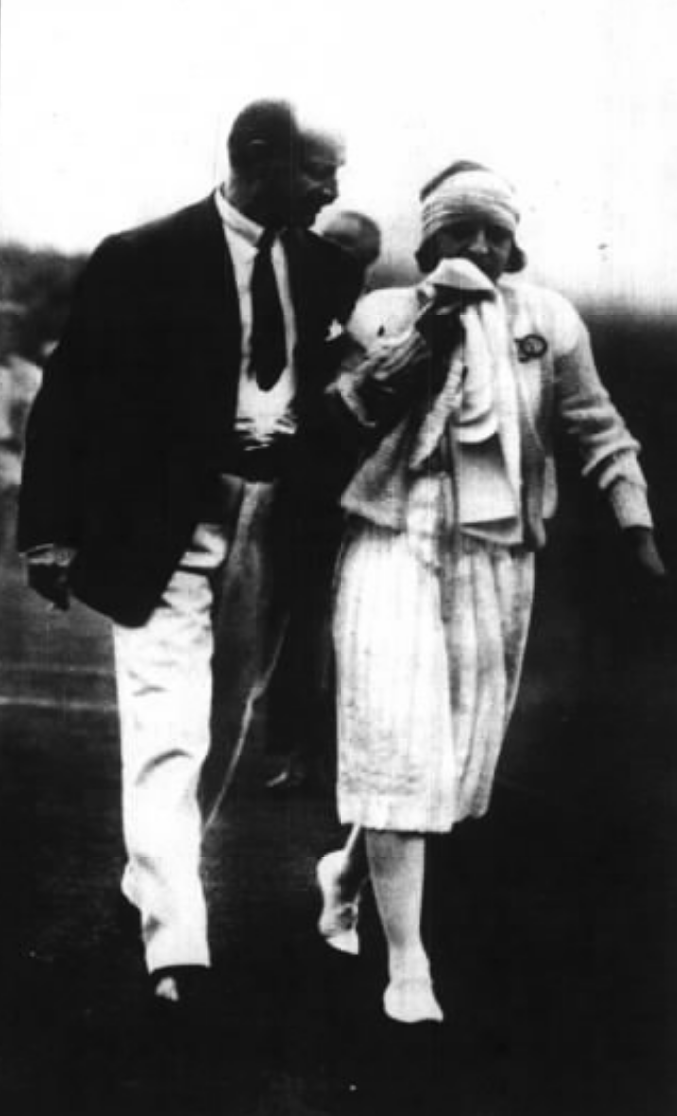
Lenglen walking off the court with FFT vice president Albert de Joannis after retiring against Mallory

Following the match, Lenglen withdrew from the doubles event, which she had entered with Mallory as her partner. Her retirement in singles was not well received by fans or journalists. In particular, sportswriters believed she retired because she did not believe she could win, not because she was ill. They coined a phrase "cough and quit" that became popular at the time for describing someone who needed an excuse to avoid losing. The fact that Lenglen was seen dancing later that night further propagated the idea that she was faking an illness. Nonetheless, a doctor visited her later that week and recommended that she rest for eight days before resuming training. Although the French Tennis Federation (FFT) accepted Lenglen's statement that she was sick, Albert de Joannis, the vice president of the FFT who had accompanied Lenglen on the trip, believed Lenglen was feigning illness and resigned over the stance the FFT had taken. After multiple canceled exhibition matches, Lenglen returned to play a practice session on August 30 but again became ill. She made her only two exhibition appearances in mixed doubles on September 10–11. After still dealing with sickness, plans to have Lenglen enter other tournaments or play an exhibition against Mallory never materialized. She left the United States on September 21.

== Aftermath ==
Despite the loss, Lenglen resumed winning after the match. Although she did not return to competitive tennis until 1922, she immediately began a 179-match win streak that remained in progress at the end of her competitive career in 1926. Lenglen had her first rematch with Mallory at the 1922 Wimbledon final, which she won with ease, only losing five games as a consequence of playing more aggressively. Lenglen then recorded a double bagel victory over Mallory on the French Riviera in 1923, their last meeting. Lenglen never played another competitive match in the United States. Nonetheless, she returned to the United States for a professional tour beginning in late 1926 in which she played exhibition matches against American tennis player Mary Browne, winning all such matches that were played to completion while again ending two matches early. (Note: As the tour was an exhibition, Lenglen did not need to officially retire to end the match early.) Lenglen's success in Europe after the loss to Mallory as well as her United States professional tour combined to help restore her reputation in United States as both a popular celebrity and a dominant tennis player.

After her victory over Lenglen, Mallory progressed to the final at the 1921 singles event, where she defeated Mary Browne to win her sixth U.S. National Championship singles title. She would go on to win two more U.S. National singles titles in 1922 and 1926. Her eight singles titles are an all-time US Open record in singles for men and women.

Lenglen and Mallory being drawn against each other in the second round led the U.S. National Championships to begin seeding players the following year to ensure that the favorites for the title would not meet in the early rounds, a practice that was soon adopted by all of the major tournaments and is ubiquitous in modern tennis.
