= 1921 World Hard Court Championships – Men's singles =

Men's singles
- 1921 World Hard Court Championships

Final
- Champion: (United States) Bill Tilden
- Runner-up: (Belgium) Jean Washer
- Score: 6–3, 6–3, 6–3

Details
- Draw: 47

Events
Singles	men	women
Doubles	men	women	mixed
- World Hard Court Championships

The men's singles was one of five events of the 1921 World Hard Court Championships tennis tournament held in Paris, France from 28 May until 5 June 1921. The draw consisted of 47 players. William Laurentz was the defending champion, but lost in the quarterfinals. Bill Tilden became the first American to win the Championship after beating Jean Washer of Belgium in the final.

== Draw ==
Key

- Q = Qualifier
- WC = Wild card
- LL = Lucky loser
- Alt = Alternate
- ITF = ITF entry
- PR = Protected ranking
- SR = Special ranking
- SE = Special exempt
- JE = Junior exempt
- JR = Junior Accelerator Programme entrant
- CO = College Accelerator Programme entrant
- NG = Next Gen Accelerator Program entrant
- w/o = Walkover
- r = Retired
- d = Defaulted

=== Finals ===
Quarterfinals
(Belgium) Jean Washer	6	6	7
(France) Jean Borotra	2	1	5
(France) William Laurentz	4	4	3
(Denmark) Erik Tegner	6	6	6
(United States) Bill Tilden	6	6	5	6
(France) Roger Danet	2	2	7	0
(France) A. Felix Poulin	3	1	6	1
(Romania) Nicolae Mişu	6	6	1	6

Semifinals
(Belgium) Jean Washer	7	4	6	6
(Denmark) Erik Tegner	5	6	1	4
(United States) Bill Tilden	6	6	6
(Romania) Nicolae Mişu	3	3	2

Final
(Belgium) Jean Washer	3	3	3
(United States) Bill Tilden	6	6	6

=== Top half ===
==== Section 1 ====
First round

Second round
(Belgium) Jean Washer	w/o
(France) Jacques Brugnon
(France) Jean le Besnerais	2	6	3	6	5
(France) Chatan	6	4	6	4	2^{r}
(France) Jean Borotra	6	1	6	4	6
(Spain) Manuel de Gomar	1	6	4	6	4
(United Kingdom) J.T. Baines	6	6	3	6
(France) Pierre Dufau	4	4	6	2

Third round
(Belgium) Jean Washer	6	6	6
(France) Jean le Besnerais	2	4	0
(France) Jean Borotra	6	8	6
(United Kingdom) J.T. Baines	1	6	3

Quarterfinals
(Belgium) Jean Washer	6	6	7
(France) Jean Borotra	2	1	5

==== Section 2 ====
First round
(France) William Laurentz	6	3	6	6
(France) Jean Francois Blanchy	0	6	3	2
(Spain) Manuel Areyzaga	6	6	5	6
(France) Jacques Samazeuilh	0	4	7	1
(France) Alain Gerbault	3	6	6	6
(France) Léonce Aslangul	6	3	0	2
(Italy) Umberto de Morpurgo	w/o
Bonnetti
(United States) Arnold Jones	6	6	6
(France) Marcel Cousin	0	2	3
(Denmark) Erik Tegner	6	6	2	6
(Switzerland) Pablo Debran	2	3	6	2
(France) Jean Faucamberge	w/o
(Spain) Luis de Olivares
(United Kingdom) Arthur Wallis Myers	6	6	6
(Switzerland) J. d'Espine	2	2	4

Second round
(France) William Laurentz	6	6	2	5	6
(Spain) Manuel Areyzaga	4	4	6	7	4
(France) Alain Gerbault	4	3	6	1
(Italy) Umberto de Morpurgo	6	6	2	6
(United States) Arnold Jones	5	1	4
(Denmark) Erik Tegner	7	6	6
(France) Jean Faucamberge	5	1	1
(United Kingdom) Arthur Wallis Myers	7	6	6

Third round
(France) William Laurentz	6	2	6	2	6
(Italy) Umberto de Morpurgo	2	6	1	6	4
(Denmark) Erik Tegner	6	2	0	6	6
(United Kingdom) Arthur Wallis Myers	4	6	6	1	1

Quarterfinals
(France) William Laurentz	4	4	3
(Denmark) Erik Tegner	6	6	6

=== Bottom half ===
==== Section 3 ====
First round
(Russia) Sergei Rodzianko	10	7	6
de Lieneres	8	5	0
(United States) Jed Jones	6	6	6
(Belgium) Albert Lammens	1	4	1
(United Kingdom) Walter Crawley	6	6	7
(France) Raymond Rodel	3	1	5
(United States) Bill Tilden	6	2	6	10
(Spain) Eduardo Flaquer	0	6	3	8
Engmann	w/o
Vallejo
(France) Pierre Albaran	w/o
(United States) Frank Hunter
R.E. Sherbrooke	6	6	10
(France) F. Rodon	2	2	8

Second round
(Russia) Sergei Rodzianko	6	0	6	5	6
(United States) Jed Jones	3	6	2	7	3
(United Kingdom) Walter Crawley	6	3	4	5
(United States) Bill Tilden	4	6	6	7
Engmann	3	1	3
(France) Pierre Albaran	6	6	6
R.E. Sherbrooke	0	2	9
(France) Roger Danet	6	6	11

Third round
(Russia) Sergei Rodzianko	3	0	1
(United States) Bill Tilden	6	6	6
(France) Pierre Albaran
(France) Roger Danet	w/o

Quarterfinals
(United States) Bill Tilden	6	6	5	6
(France) Roger Danet	2	2	7	0

==== Section 4 ====
First round

Second round
(Switzerland) Charles Aeschlimann	6	6	6
(France) Marcel Dupont	1	2	1
(France) A. Felix Poulin	6	7	4	6
Blanc	2	5	6	3
(Romania) Nicolae Mişu	6	11	6
(France) André Gobert	3	9	3
(Spain) Jose Maria Areyzaga	3	6	6	6
(France) Pierre Hirsch	6	2	0	4

Third round
(Switzerland) Charles Aeschlimann	10	6	0	4	3
(France) A. Felix Poulin	8	3	6	6	6
(Romania) Nicolae Mişu	6	9	6
(Spain) Jose Maria Areyzaga	2	7	2

Quarterfinals
(France) A. Felix Poulin	3	1	6	1
(Romania) Nicolae Mişu	6	6	1	6
