= 1919 Wimbledon Championships – Women's singles final =

Tennis championship match

1919 Wimbledon women's singles final
- (France) Suzanne Lenglen vs. (United Kingdom) Dorothea Lambert Chambers
Set	1	2	3
(France) Suzanne Lenglen	10	4	9
(United Kingdom) Dorothea Lambert Chambers	8	6	7
- Date: 7 July 1919
- Tournament: Wimbledon Championships
- Location: All England Club, Worple Road, Wimbledon
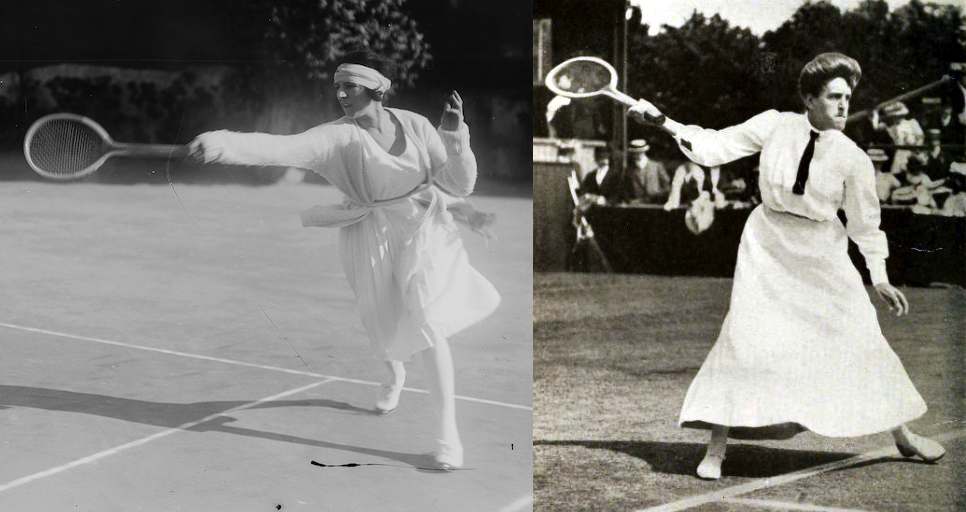
- Lenglen (left) and Lambert Chambers (right)

The 1919 Wimbledon women's singles final was a championship match at the 1919 Wimbledon Championships, one of the three amateur tennis World Championship tournaments at the time and one of the four modern Grand Slam tournaments. The final was contested as a challenge round between French tennis player Suzanne Lenglen, the winner of the All Comers' bracket, and British tennis player Dorothea Lambert Chambers, the reigning champion from 1914. Lenglen won the match 10–8, 4–6, 9–7 for the title, her first of six Wimbledon singles titles and second major singles title out of 12 in total between her four world championship singles titles and eight Grand Slam singles titles. Lenglen also won the women's doubles title at the tournament with Elizabeth Ryan.

With the victory, Lenglen became a global sport celebrity and elevated women's tennis to a similar stature as men's tennis instead of a sideshow. The attendance of 8000 at the match that was more than double the seating capacity led Wimbledon to build a much larger venue that opened three years later. The match set the record for most games in a Wimbledon women's singles final at 44, which stood until 1970. Lenglen and Lambert Chambers had a rematch in the Wimbledon challenge round the following year that Lenglen won easily.

== Background ==
The 1919 edition of the Wimbledon Championships was the first since 1914 after a four-year hiatus due to World War I. It was one of two world championship tournaments held that year, along with the World Covered Court Championships. The third such tournament, the World Hard Court Championships, waited until 1920 to resume in part due it being scheduled earlier in the calendar year. At the time, Wimbledon was also known as the World Grass Court Championships to match the naming scheme of the other two world championships on clay (known as Hard Court) and wood (known as Covered Court).

With the challenge system in place, Suzanne Lenglen had to win six matches to reach the challenge round, while Dorothea Lambert Chambers did not have to play any other matches. Lenglen made it through the first four rounds while only losing six games. Among the players she defeated were 1912 champion Ethel Larcombe and future champion Kathleen McKane. Her biggest challenge in the All Comers' competition was her doubles partner Ryan, who saved match points down 2–5 to level the second set at five games. After an hour-long rain delay at 30–30, Lenglen won the last two games to win the match. Following a lopsided victory in the All Comers' final against Sattherthwaite, Lenglen faced Lambert Chambers in the challenge round. Lenglen was 20 years old and the reigning World Hard Court champion from 1914, while Lambert Chambers was 40 years old and a seven-time Wimbledon champion. Although Lambert Chambers had defeated Lenglen in their only previous encounter in 1914, Lenglen was considered the favourite for this match five years later.

== Match details ==
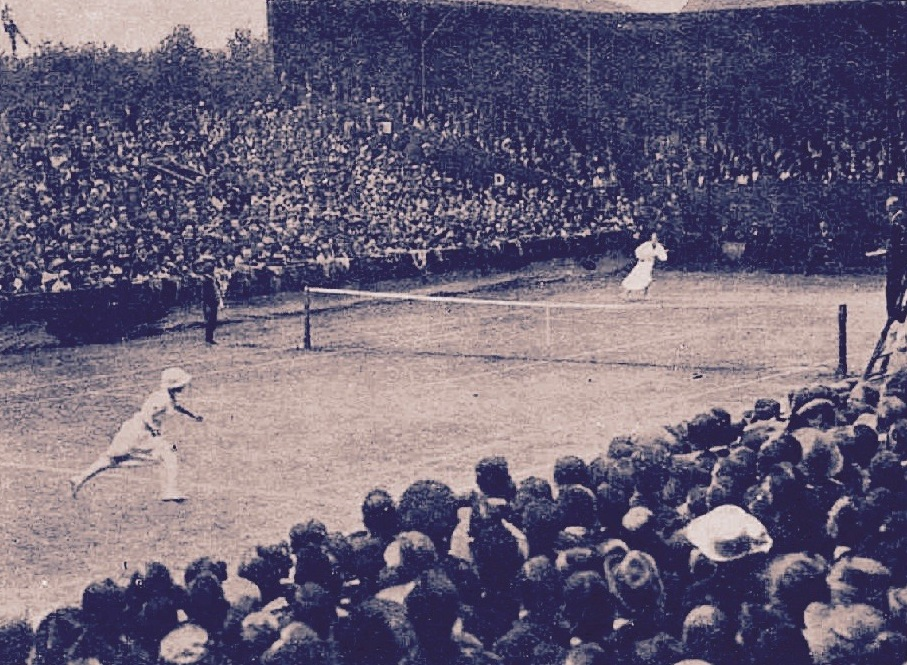
Lenglen (near court) and Lambert Chambers (far court) contesting the 1919 Wimbledon final

All three sets of the match were extremely close. Lambert Chambers was able to trouble Lenglen with well-placed drop shots. While Lenglen led most of the first set, Lambert Chambers saved two set points with drop shots while down 3–5 and then earned two set points of her own at 6–5. However, Lenglen saved both and eventually won the set 10–8. Lambert Chambers forced a third set, despite squandering a 4–1 lead. The situation reversed in the final set as Lambert Chambers came from 4–1 down to earn two match points at 6–5. Though like in the first set, Lenglen saved both of them, including the first with a volley off the wooden frame of her racquet on an attempted passing shot by Lambert Chambers. She ultimately won the set 9–7 for her first Wimbledon title. The match set the record for most games in a Wimbledon women's singles final with 44, a mark only since surpassed by the 1970 final between Margaret Court and Billie Jean King. Over 8000 people attended the match, including King George V and Queen Mary, and well above the seating capacity of 3500 on Centre Court.

== Aftermath ==
Lenglen's victory cemented her place at the top of women's tennis, where she would remain until she retired from competitive tennis in 1926. It also made Lenglen a star and an international celebrity, while boosting the popularity of women's tennis in general. In particular, the sellout crowd of 8000 greatly exceeding the seating capacity of 3500 at Worple Road led Wimbledon to build a new venue at Church Road with a seating capacity of 10000. The new stadium opened three years later in 1922 and Church Road remains the site of Wimbledon today.

Lambert Chambers played in one more Wimbledon, reaching the challenge round again the following year to set up a rematch of the 1919 final. Lenglen won the rematch much more easily, only losing three games. Aside from the 1919 final, Lenglen never lost more than three games in a single set in any of her other major finals at the world championship or Grand Slam tournaments before or thereafter.
