= 1921 Wimbledon Championships – Women's doubles =

Women's doubles
- 1921 Wimbledon Championships

Final
- Champions: (France) Suzanne Lenglen (United States) Elizabeth Ryan
- Runners-up: (United Kingdom) Winifred Beamish (South Africa) Irene Peacock
- Score: 6–1, 6–2

Details
- Draw: 23
- Seeds: –

Events
Singles	men	women		boys	girls
Doubles	men	women	mixed	boys	girls
← 1920 ·	Wimbledon Championships	· 1922 →

Suzanne Lenglen and Elizabeth Ryan successfully defended their title, defeating Winifred Beamish and Irene Peacock in the final, 6–1, 6–2 to win the ladies' doubles tennis title at the 1921 Wimbledon Championships.

== Draw ==
=== Key ===
- Q = Qualifier
- WC = Wild card
- LL = Lucky loser
- Alt = Alternate
- SE = Special exempt
- PR = Protected ranking
- ITF = ITF entry
- JE = Junior exempt
- w/o = Walkover
- r = Retired
- d = Defaulted
- SR = Special ranking

=== Finals ===
Semifinals
(United Kingdom) Doris Craddock (United Kingdom) Margaret McKane	2	1
(United Kingdom) Winifred Beamish (South Africa) Irene Peacock	6	6
(France) Suzanne Lenglen (United States) Elizabeth Ryan	6	6
(United Kingdom) Phyllis Howkins (United Kingdom) Dorothy Shepherd	2	0

Final
(United Kingdom) Winifred Beamish (South Africa) Irene Peacock	1	2
(France) Suzanne Lenglen (United States) Elizabeth Ryan	6	6

=== Top half ===
First round
(United Kingdom) WM Haughton (United Kingdom) Mrs RRW Jackson	6	2	16
(United Kingdom) Peggy Dransfield (United Kingdom) Norah Middleton	3	6	14
(United Kingdom) MM Fergus (United Kingdom) M Thom	2	6	4
(United Kingdom) Una Gracey (United Kingdom) Dorothy Holman	6	4	6
(United Kingdom) Winifred Beamish (South Africa) Irene Peacock	6	6
(United Kingdom) Mabel Clayton (United Kingdom) Mrs J O'Neill	1	0
(United Kingdom) Aurea Edgington (United Kingdom) Mrs Rowand Harker	6	6
(United Kingdom) HL Eddis; ERE Mercer	3	2

Second round
(United Kingdom) Mrs HA Davis (United Kingdom) Phyllis Satterthwaite	w/o
(United Kingdom) Mrs Armstrong (United Kingdom) Hazel Hogarth
(United States) Molla Mallory (United States) Edith Sigourney	6	4	0
(United Kingdom) Doris Craddock (United Kingdom) Margaret McKane	4	6	6
(United Kingdom) WM Haughton (United Kingdom) Mrs RRW Jackson	3	4
(United Kingdom) U Gracey (United Kingdom) D Holman	6	6
(United Kingdom) W Beamish (South Africa) I Peacock	6	6
(United Kingdom) A Edgington (United Kingdom) Mrs Rowand Harker	3	1

Quarterfinals
(United Kingdom) Mrs Armstrong (United Kingdom) H Hogarth	4	3
(United Kingdom) D Craddock (United Kingdom) M McKane	6	6
(United Kingdom) U Gracey (United Kingdom) D Holman	0	0
(United Kingdom) W Beamish (South Africa) I Peacock	6	6

Semifinals
(United Kingdom) D Craddock (United Kingdom) M McKane	2	1
(United Kingdom) W Beamish (South Africa) I Peacock	6	6

The nationality of ERE Mercer is unknown.

=== Bottom half ===
First round
(United Kingdom) Kitty McKane (United Kingdom) Winifred McNair	w/o
(France) Suzanne Lenglen (United States) Elizabeth Ryan
(United Kingdom) Evelyn Colyer (United Kingdom) Peggy Ingram	4	4
(United Kingdom) Dorothy Kemmis-Betty (United Kingdom) Mabel Parton	6	6
(United Kingdom) Dorothea Lambert Chambers (United Kingdom) Ethel Larcombe	6	6
(United Kingdom) Mrs D Harvey (United Kingdom) Edith Johnson	0	0

Second round
(France) S Lenglen (United States) E Ryan	6	6
(United Kingdom) D Kemmis-Betty (United Kingdom) M Parton	0	1
(United Kingdom) D Lambert Chambers (United Kingdom) E Larcombe	6	6
(United Kingdom) Mrs WL Hollick (United Kingdom) Cecily Marriott	1	2
(Belgium) Anne de Borman (United Kingdom) Mrs HB Weston	6	6
(United Kingdom) Mrs AA Hall (United Kingdom) Mrs Perrett	3	3
(United Kingdom) Phyllis Howkins (United Kingdom) Dorothy Shepherd	6	6
(United Kingdom) Eleanor Rose (United Kingdom) EE Tanner	4	4

Quarterfinals
(France) S Lenglen (United States) E Ryan	6	6
(United Kingdom) D Lambert Chambers (United Kingdom) E Larcombe	2	2
(Belgium) A de Borman (United Kingdom) Mrs HB Weston	2	2
(United Kingdom) P Howkins (United Kingdom) D Shepherd	6	6

Semifinals
(France) S Lenglen (United States) E Ryan	6	6
(United Kingdom) P Howkins (United Kingdom) D Shepherd	2	0
