= 1921 World Hard Court Championships =

- Date: 28 May–5 June
- Edition: 5th
- Category: World Championship
- Surface: Clay / outdoor
- Location: Saint-Cloud, Paris, France
- Venue: Stade Français

Champions

Men's singles
- (United States) Bill Tilden

Women's singles
- (France) Suzanne Lenglen

Men's doubles
- (France) André Gobert (France) William Laurentz

Women's doubles
- (France) Germaine Golding (France) Suzanne Lenglen

Mixed doubles
- (France) Max Decugis (France) Suzanne Lenglen
- World Hard Court Championships

The 1921 World Hard Court Championships (WHCC) (French: Championnats du Monde de Tennis sur Terre Battue) was the fifth edition of the World Hard Court Championships tennis tournament, considered as the precursor to the French Open, and was held on the clay courts of the Stade Français at the Parc de Saint-Cloud in Paris from 28 May until 5 June 1921.

The Championships was organised by the Fédération Française de Tennis, which had recently separated from the L'Union des Sociétés Française de Sports Athlétiques, the organiser of the first four editions.

The field at the Championships was stronger this year as the United States sent an official delegation of its best players, including Bill Tilden and Molla Mallory, for the first time.

Suzanne Lenglen became the first player in the Championships' history to win the singles, doubles and mixed doubles events.

== Finals ==
=== Men's singles ===
(United States) Bill Tilden defeated (Belgium) Jean Washer, 6–3, 6–3, 6–3

=== Women's singles ===
(France) Suzanne Lenglen defeated (United States) Molla Mallory, 6–2, 6–3

=== Men's doubles ===
(France) André Gobert / (France) William Laurentz defeated (France) Pierre Albarran / (France) Alain Gerbault, 6–4, 6–2, 6–8, 6–2

=== Women's doubles ===
(France) Germaine Golding / (France) Suzanne Lenglen defeated (United Kingdom) Dorothy Holman / (South Africa) Irene Peacock, 6–2, 6–2

=== Mixed doubles ===
(France) Max Decugis / (France) Suzanne Lenglen defeated (France) William Laurentz / (France) Germaine Golding, 6–3, 6–2
