= 1921 Wimbledon Championships – Women's singles =

Women's singles
- 1921 Wimbledon Championships

Final
- Champion: (France) Suzanne Lenglen
- Runner-up: (United States) Elizabeth Ryan
- Score: 6–2, 6–0

Details
- Draw: 56
- Seeds: –

Events
| Singles | men | women | | boys | girls |
| Doubles | men | women | mixed | boys | girls |
| ← 1920 · | Wimbledon Championships | · 1922 → |

Elizabeth Ryan defeated Phyllis Satterthwaite 6–1, 6–0 in the All Comers' Final, but the reigning champion Suzanne Lenglen defeated Ryan 6–2, 6–0 in the Challenge Round to win the Ladies' Singles at the 1921 Wimbledon Championships.

This was the last year that the defending champion received an automatic bye into the final (formally known as the Challenge round). Beginning in 1922, the defending champion was required to play in the regular Wimbledon draw.

== Draw ==
=== Key ===
- Q = Qualifier
- WC = Wild card
- LL = Lucky loser
- Alt = Alternate
- SE = Special exempt
- PR = Protected ranking
- ITF = ITF entry
- JE = Junior exempt
- w/o = Walkover
- r = Retired
- d = Defaulted
- SR = Special ranking

=== Challenge round ===
| Challenge Round |
| (United States) Elizabeth Ryan | 2 | 0 |
| (France) Suzanne Lenglen | 6 | 6 |

=== All comers' finals ===
Quarterfinals
(United Kingdom) Mabel Clayton | 6 | 6
(United Kingdom) Dorothy Shepherd | 3 | 2
(United Kingdom) Phyllis Satterthwaite | 6 | 6 | 6
(United Kingdom) Phyllis Howkins | 1 | 8 | 1
(United Kingdom) Winifred McNair | 5 | 6 | 4
(South Africa) Irene Peacock | 7 | 2 | 6
(United States) Elizabeth Ryan | 0 | 6 | 6
(United States) Molla Mallory | 6 | 4 | 4

Semifinals
(United Kingdom) Mabel Clayton | 6 | 2
(United Kingdom) Phyllis Satterthwaite | 8 | 6
(South Africa) Irene Peacock | 6 | 4
(United States) Elizabeth Ryan | 8 | 6

Final
(United Kingdom) Phyllis Satterthwaite | 1 | 0
(United States) Elizabeth Ryan | 6 | 6

=== Top half ===
==== Section 1 ====
First round
(United Kingdom) Helen Leisk
(United Kingdom) Mrs HA Davis | w/o
(United Kingdom) Mrs Perrett | 6 | 5 | 2
(United Kingdom) Annie Cobb | 3 | 7 | 6
(United Kingdom) Mrs HV Parbury | 6 | 4 | 3
(United Kingdom) WM Haughton | 3 | 6 | 6
(United Kingdom) Dorothy Shepherd | 6 | 6
(United Kingdom) Weeta Donaldson | 0 | 0

Second round
(United Kingdom) Margaret McKane | 1 | 6 | 3
(United Kingdom) Mabel Clayton | 6 | 2 | 6
(United Kingdom) E Kelsey | 7 | 7
(United Kingdom) Peggy Ingram | 5 | 5
(United Kingdom) H Leisk | 6 | 6
(United Kingdom) A Cobb | 3 | 1
(United Kingdom) WM Haughton | 5 | 6 | 1
(United Kingdom) D Shepherd | 7 | 4 | 6

Third round
(United Kingdom) M Clayton | 6 | 6
(United Kingdom) E Kelsey | 1 | 0
(United Kingdom) H Leisk | 5 | 6 | 1
(United Kingdom) D Shepherd | 7 | 4 | 6

Quarterfinals
(United Kingdom) M Clayton | 6 | 6
(United Kingdom) D Shepherd | 3 | 2

==== Section 2 ====
First round
(United Kingdom) M Thom | 5 | 2
(United Kingdom) Mrs WL Hollick | 7 | 6
(United Kingdom) Eleanor Rose | 6 | 6
(Belgium) Anne de Borman | 3 | 4
(United Kingdom) Phyllis Satterthwaite | 6 | 0 | 6
(United Kingdom) Gladys Lamplough | 3 | 6 | 2
(United Kingdom) Mrs AA Hall | 2 | 1
(United Kingdom) Doris Craddock | 6 | 6
(United Kingdom) Peggy Dransfield | 4 | 6 | 6
(United Kingdom) Cecily Marriott | 6 | 2 | 1
(United Kingdom) Phyllis Howkins | 6 | 6
(United Kingdom) Tiny Alston | 1 | 0
(United Kingdom) EE Tanner | 6 | 6
(United Kingdom) NB Palmer | 1 | 2
(United Kingdom) R Foulger | 3 | 1
(United Kingdom) MM Fergus | 6 | 6

Second round
(United Kingdom) Mrs WL Hollick | 1 | 2
(United Kingdom) E Rose | 6 | 6
(United Kingdom) P Satterthwaite | 6 | 2 | 7
(United Kingdom) D Craddock | 1 | 6 | 5
(United Kingdom) P Dransfield | 4 | 7
(United Kingdom) P Howkins | 6 | 9
(United Kingdom) EE Tanner | 7 | 5 | 4
(United Kingdom) MM Fergus | 5 | 7 | 6

Third round
(United Kingdom) E Rose | 2 | 1
(United Kingdom) P Satterthwaite | 6 | 6
(United Kingdom) P Howkins | 6 | 6
(United Kingdom) MM Fergus | 0 | 4

Quarterfinals
(United Kingdom) P Satterthwaite | 6 | 6 | 6
(United Kingdom) P Howkins | 1 | 8 | 1

=== Bottom half ===
==== Section 3 ====
First round
(United Kingdom) Louise Bull | 6 | 6
(United Kingdom) Mrs RRW Jackson | 2 | 1
(United Kingdom) Winifred McNair | 6 | 6
(United Kingdom) Mabel Parton | 1 | 0
(United Kingdom) Norah Middleton | 6 | 6
(United States) Edith Sigourney | 2 | 4
(United Kingdom) Betty Crundall Punnett | 3 | 2
(United Kingdom) KAH Todd | 6 | 6
(United Kingdom) E Tighe | 4 | 1
(United Kingdom) Una Gracey | 6 | 6
(United Kingdom) Mrs Rowand Harker | 6 | 5 | 4
(United Kingdom) Enid Head | 4 | 7 | 6
(United Kingdom) Mrs O Bruce | 1 | 0
(South Africa) Irene Peacock | 6 | 6
(United Kingdom) Mrs J O'Neill | 5 | 6 | 6
(United Kingdom) Evelyn Colyer | 7 | 0 | 2

Second round
(United Kingdom) L Bull | 6 | 4 | 3
(United Kingdom) W McNair | 4 | 6 | 6
(United Kingdom) N Middleton | 8 | 6
(United Kingdom) KAH Todd | 6 | 3
(United Kingdom) U Gracey | 6 | 4 | 7
(United Kingdom) E Head | 4 | 6 | 5
(South Africa) I Peacock | 6 | 6
(United Kingdom) Mrs J O'Neill | 1 | 2

Third round
(United Kingdom) W McNair | 7 | 6
(United Kingdom) N Middleton | 5 | 2
(United Kingdom) U Gracey | 0 | 4
(South Africa) I Peacock | 6 | 6

Quarterfinals
(United Kingdom) W McNair | 5 | 6 | 4
(South Africa) I Peacock | 7 | 2 | 6

==== Section 4 ====
First round
(United Kingdom) Winifred Beamish | 6 | 6
(United Kingdom) M Smailes | 0 | 0
(United Kingdom) Mrs HB Weston | 9 | 4
(United Kingdom) Dorothy Holman | 11 | 6
(United Kingdom) Kitty McKane | 6 | 6
(United Kingdom) Aurea Edgington | 2 | 4
(United States) Elizabeth Ryan | 6 | 6
(United Kingdom) Dorothy Kemmis-Betty | 3 | 1

Second round
(United Kingdom) W Beamish | 6 | 7
(United Kingdom) D Holman | 1 | 5
(United Kingdom) K McKane | 4 | 2
(United States) E Ryan | 6 | 6
(United Kingdom) Blanche Colston | 1 | 3
(United Kingdom) Dora Geen | 6 | 6
(United Kingdom) Edith Johnson | w/o
(United States) Molla Mallory

Third round
(United Kingdom) W Beamish | 5 | 4
(United States) E Ryan | 7 | 6
(United Kingdom) D Geen | 3 | 2
(United States) M Mallory | 6 | 6

Quarterfinals
(United States) E Ryan | 0 | 6 | 6
(United States) M Mallory | 6 | 4 | 4
