= Nanette le Besnerais =

French tennis player (1896–1981)

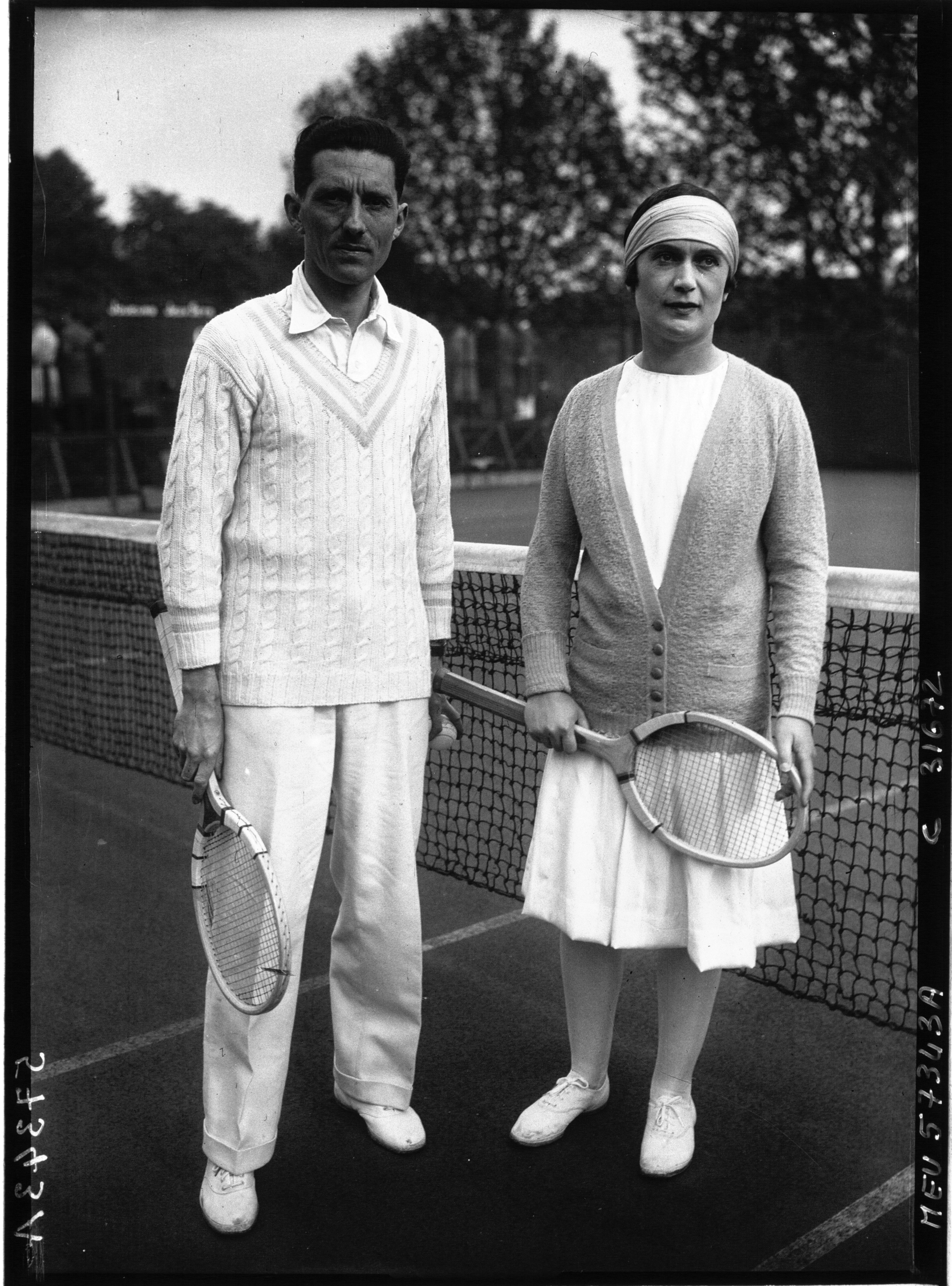
- Le Besnerais with mixed doubles partner Jacques Brugnon
- Full name: Anne-Marie Le Besnerais
- Country (sports): France
- Born: 4 January 1896 Laurède, Aquitaine, France
- Died: 20 December 1981 (aged 85)

Singles

Grand Slam singles results
- French Open: 2R (1927, 1931, 1932)

Other tournaments
- WHCC: 2R (1922)

Doubles

Other doubles tournaments
- WHCC: SF (1921)

Mixed doubles

Grand Slam mixed doubles results
- French Open: F (1926)

Other mixed doubles tournaments
- WHCC: 2R (1922)

Anne-Marie "Nanette" le Besnerais (née Anne-Marie Carbonel-Tequi; 4 January 1896 – 20 December 1981) was a French tennis player. She finished runner-up in mixed doubles at the 1926 French Championships to Suzanne Lenglen and Jacques Brugnon while competing with Jean Borotra.

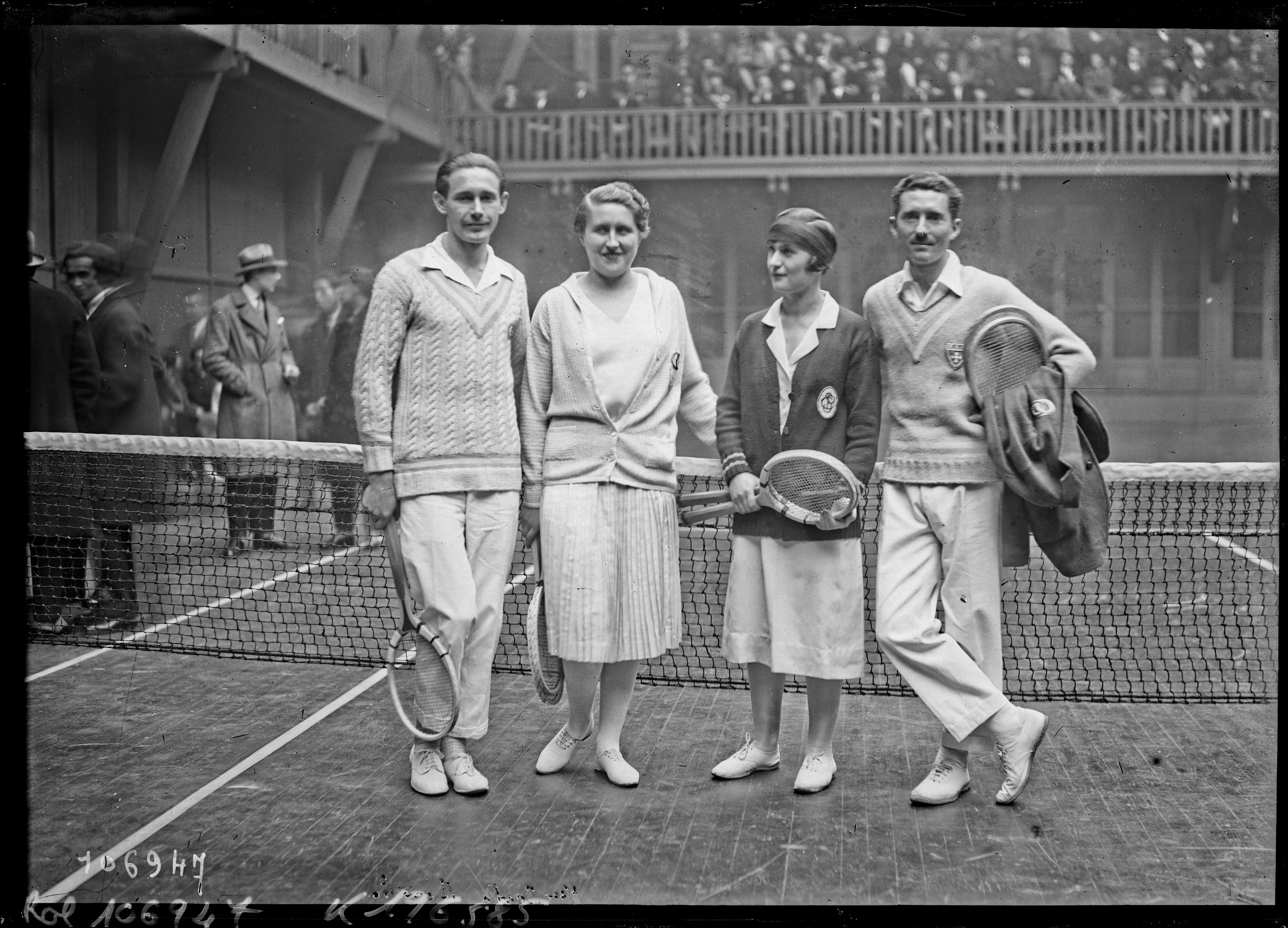
Le Besnerais (second from left) pictured with Jacques Brugnon, Marguerite Broquedis, and Jean Borotra

== Grand Slam finals ==
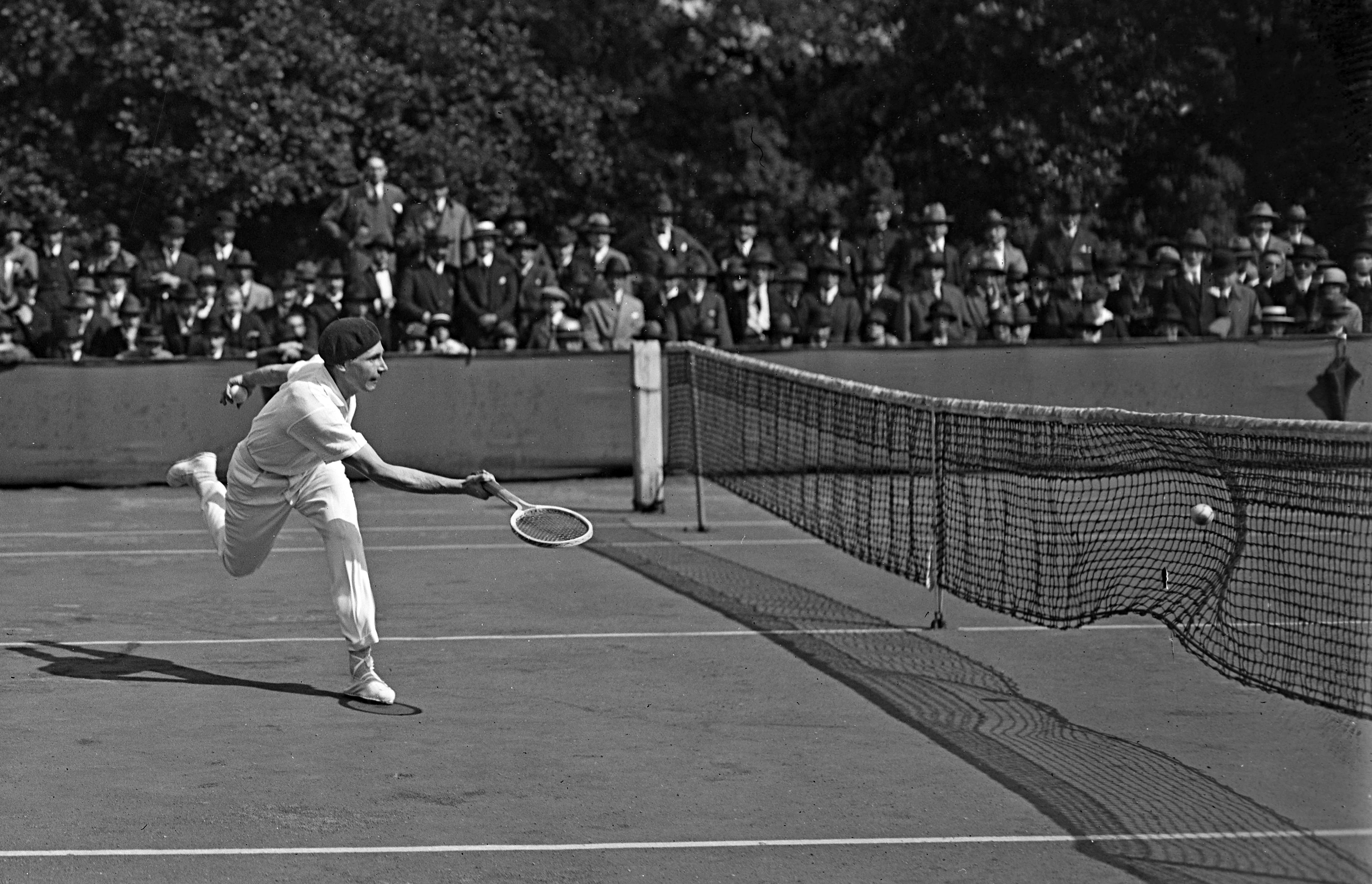
Borotra at the 1924 French Championships.

=== Mixed doubles: 1 runner-up ===
Result	Year	Championship	Surface	Partner	Opponents	Score
Loss	1926	French Championships	Clay	(France) Jean Borotra	(France) Jacques Brugnon (France) Suzanne Lenglen	4–6, 3–6
