= Suzanne Lenglen =

French tennis player (1899–1938)

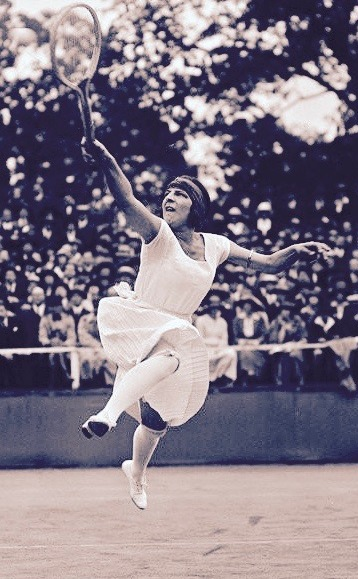
- Lenglen in 1922
- Country (sports): France
- Born: 24 May 1899 Paris, France
- Died: 4 July 1938 (aged 39) Paris, France
- Height: 1.64 m (5 ft 5 in) (Note: also approximated as "five and a half feet" or "five feet six inches")
- Turned pro: August 1926
- Plays: Right-handed (one-handed backhand)
- Coach: Charles Lenglen
- Int. Tennis HoF: 1978 (member page)

Singles
- Career record: 332–7
- Career titles: 83
- Highest ranking: No. 1 (1921) (Note: Ranking by A. Wallis Myers)

Grand Slam singles results
- French Open: W (1925, 1926)
- Wimbledon: W (1919, 1920, 1921, 1922, 1923, 1925)
- US Open: 2R (1921)

Other tournaments
- WHCC: W (1914, 1921, 1922, 1923)
- Olympic Games: W (1920)

Doubles
- Career record: 254–6
- Career titles: 74

Grand Slam doubles results
- French Open: W (1925, 1926)
- Wimbledon: W (1919, 1920, 1921, 1922, 1923, 1925)

Other doubles tournaments
- WHCC: W (1914, 1921, 1922)
- Olympic Games: SF – Bronze (1920)

Mixed doubles
- Career record: 381–18
- Career titles: 93

Grand Slam mixed doubles results
- French Open: W (1925, 1926)
- Wimbledon: W (1920, 1922, 1925)

Other mixed doubles tournaments
- WHCC: W (1921, 1922, 1923)
- Olympic Games: W (1920)
Medal record
Olympic Games
Gold medal – first place	1920 Antwerp	Women's singles
Gold medal – first place	1920 Antwerp	Mixed doubles
Bronze medal – third place	1920 Antwerp	Women's doubles

Suzanne Rachel Flore Lenglen (French pronunciation: [syzan lɑ̃ɡlɛn]; 24 May 1899 – 4 July 1938) was a French tennis player. She was the inaugural world No. 1 from 1921 to 1926, winning eight Grand Slam titles in singles and twenty-one in total. She was also a four-time World Hard Court Champion in singles, and ten times in total. (Note: From 1912 to 1923, there were three World Championship tournaments that were precursors to the four modern Grand Slam tournaments. Modern statistics count results from Wimbledon toward the Grand Slams, while counting results from the other two toward the World Championships.) Lenglen won six Wimbledon singles titles, including five in a row from 1919 to 1923, and was the champion in singles, doubles, and mixed doubles at the first two open French Championships in 1925 and 1926. In doubles, she was undefeated with her usual partner, Elizabeth Ryan, highlighted by another six titles at Wimbledon. Lenglen was the first leading amateur to turn professional. She ranked as the greatest women's tennis player from the amateur era in the 100 Greatest of All Time series on the Tennis Channel in 2012.

Coached by her father Charles throughout her career, Lenglen began playing tennis at age 11, becoming the youngest major champion in history with her 1914 World Hard Court Championship title at age 15. This success, along with her balletic playing style and brash personality, helped make Lenglen a national heroine in a country coping with the aftermath of World War I. After the war had delayed her career four years, Lenglen was largely unchallenged. She won her Wimbledon debut in 1919 in the second-longest final in history, the only one of her major singles finals she did not win by a lopsided scoreline. Her only post-war loss came in a retirement against Molla Mallory, her only amateur match in the United States. Afterwards, she began a 179-match win streak, during which she defeated Helen Wills in the high-profile Match of the Century in 1926. Following a misunderstanding at Wimbledon later that year, Lenglen abruptly retired from amateur tennis, signing to headline a professional tour in the United States beginning that same year.

Referred to by the French press as La Divine (The Goddess), Lenglen revolutionised the sport by integrating the aggressive style of men's tennis into the women's game and breaking the convention of women competing in clothing unsuitable for tennis. She incorporated fashion into her matches, highlighted by her signature bandeau headwear. Lenglen is recognised as the first female athlete to become a global sport celebrity and her popularity led Wimbledon to move to its larger modern-day venue. Her professional tours laid the foundation for the series of men's professional tours that continued until the Open Era, and led to the first major men's professional tournament the following year. Lenglen was inducted into the International Tennis Hall of Fame in 1978, and the second show court at the site of the French Open is named in her honour.

== Early life and background ==
Suzanne Rachel Flore Lenglen was born in the 16th arrondissement of Paris on 24 May 1899 to Charles and Anaïs Lenglen (née Dhainault). She had a younger brother who did not live past the age of three. Lenglen's father was a pharmacist who became wealthy by inheriting a horse-drawn omnibus company from his father. Several years after Suzanne was born, her father sold the omnibus business, after which he relocated the family to Marest-sur-Matz near Compiègne in northern France in 1904. They spent their winters in Nice on the French Riviera in a villa across the street from the Nice Lawn Tennis Club. By the time Lenglen was eight, she excelled at a variety of sports, including swimming and cycling. In particular, she enjoyed diabolo, a game involving balancing a spinning top on a string with two attached sticks. During the winter, Lenglen performed diabolo routines in front of large crowds on the Promenade des Anglais in Nice. Her father credited her confidence to play tennis in large stadiums to her experience as a diabolo performer.

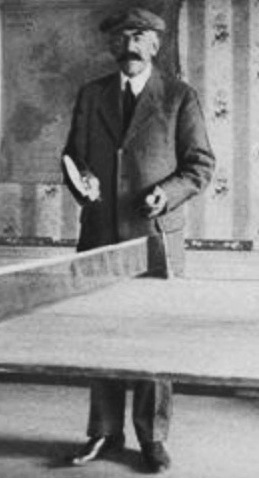
Lenglen's father

Lenglen's father attended tennis tournaments on the Riviera circuit, where the world's best players competed in the first half of the year. Having played the sport recreationally, he bought Lenglen a racket from a toy shop in June 1910 shortly after she had turned 11 years old, and set up a makeshift court on the lawn of their house. She quickly showed enough skill to convince her father to get her a proper racket from a tennis manufacturer within a month. He then developed training exercises and played against his daughter. Three months later, Lenglen travelled to Paris to play on a proper clay court owned by her father's friend, Dr. Cizelly. At Cizelly's recommendation, she entered a local high-level tournament in Chantilly. In the singles handicap event, Lenglen won four rounds and finished in second place. (Note: Handicap results are not counted towards Lenglen's overall records in singles, doubles, or mixed doubles.)

Lenglen's success at the Chantilly tournament prompted her father to train her more seriously. He studied the leading male and female players and decided to teach Lenglen the tactics from the men's game, which were more aggressive than the women's style of slowly constructing points from the baseline. When the family returned to Nice towards the end of autumn, her father arranged for her to play twice a week at the Nice Lawn Tennis Club even though children had never been allowed on the courts, and had her practise with leading male players at the club. Lenglen began training with Joseph Negro, the club's teaching professional. Negro had a wide variety of shots in his repertoire and trained Lenglen to play the same way. As Lenglen's primary coach, her father employed harsh and rigorous methods, saying, "I was a hard taskmaster, and although my advice was always well intentioned, my criticisms were at times severe, and occasionally intemperate." Lenglen's parents watched her matches and discussed her minute errors between themselves throughout, showing restraint in their criticisms only when she was sick. As a result, Lenglen became comfortable with appearing ill, which made it difficult for others to tell if she was sick.

== Amateur career ==
=== 1912–13: Maiden titles ===
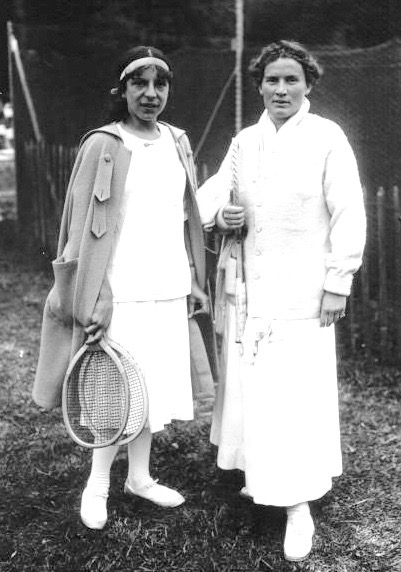
Lenglen (left) with usual doubles partner Elizabeth Ryan in 1914. They first played together in 1913.

Lenglen entered her first non-handicap singles event in July 1912 at the Compiègne Championships near her hometown, her only regular event of the year. She won her debut match in the quarterfinals before losing her semifinal to Jeanne Matthey. She also played in the singles and mixed doubles handicap events, winning both of them. When Lenglen returned to Nice in 1913, she entered a handicap doubles event in Monte Carlo with Elizabeth Ryan, an American who had moved to England a year earlier. Although they lost the final in three sets, Ryan became Lenglen's most frequent doubles partner and the pair never lost another match. Lenglen's success at handicap events led her to enter more regular events in the rest of 1913. She debuted at the South of France Championships at the Nice Club in March, winning only one match. Nonetheless, when Lenglen returned to Compiègne, she won her first two regular singles titles, both within a few weeks of her 14th birthday. After losing to Matthey again at both of her events in July, the latter of which by default, Lenglen rebounded to win titles in her last two singles events of the year.

=== 1914: World Hard Court champion ===
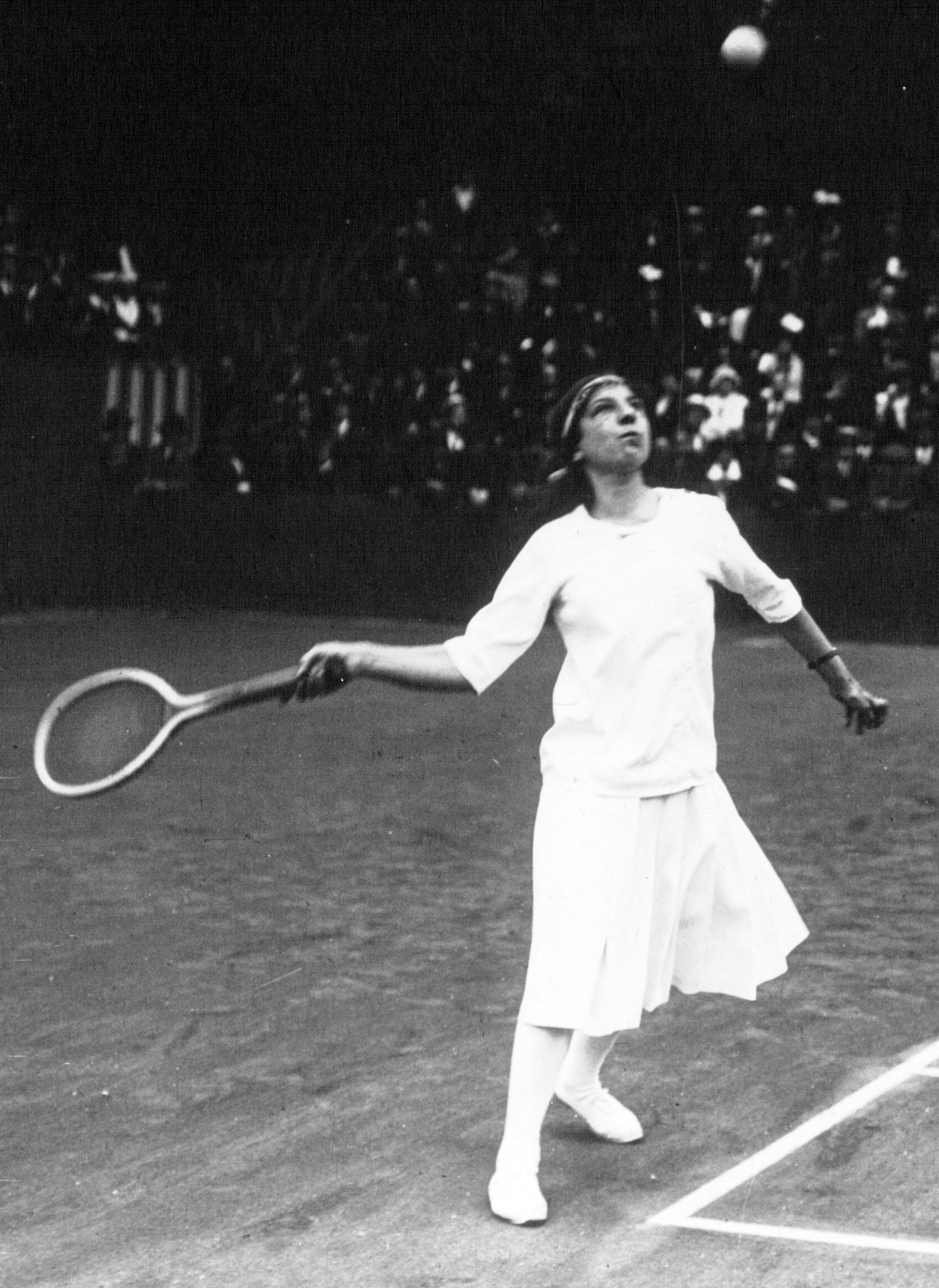
Lenglen at the 1914 World Hard Court Championships

Back on the Riviera in 1914, Lenglen focused on regular events. Her victory in singles against the high-ranking British player Ruth Winch was regarded as a huge surprise by the tennis community. However, Lenglen still struggled at larger tournaments early in the year, losing to Ryan in the quarterfinals at Monte Carlo and six-time Wimbledon champion Dorothea Lambert Chambers in the semifinals at the South of France Championships. In May, Lenglen was invited to enter the French Championships, which was restricted to French players. The format gave the defending champion a bye until the final match, known as the challenge round. In that match, they faced the winner of the All Comers' competition, a standard tournament bracket for the remaining players. Lenglen won the All Comers' singles draw of six players to make it to the challenge round against Marguerite Broquedis. Despite winning the first set, she lost the match. This was the last time in Lenglen's career she lost a completed singles match, and the only time she lost a singles final other than by default. Although she also lost the doubles challenge round at the tournament to Blanche and Suzanne Amblard, Lenglen won the mixed doubles title with Max Decugis as her partner.

Lenglen's performance at the French Championships set the stage for her debut at the World Hard Court Championships, one of the major tournaments recognised by the International Lawn Tennis Federation at the time. She won the singles final against Germaine Golding for her first major title. The only set she lost during the event was to Suzanne Amblard in the semifinals. Her volleying ability was instrumental in defeating Amblard, and her ability to outlast Golding in long rallies gave her the advantage in the final. Lenglen also won the doubles title with Ryan over the Amblard sisters without dropping a game in the final. She finished runner-up in mixed doubles to Ryan and Decugis. Following the World Hard Court Championships, Lenglen could have debuted at Wimbledon, but her father decided against it. He did not like her chances of defeating Lambert Chambers on grass, a surface on which she had never competed, given that she had already lost to her earlier in the year on clay.

=== World War I hiatus ===
After World War I began in August 1914, tournaments ceased, interfering with Lenglen's father's plan for her to enter Wimbledon in 1915. During the war, Lenglen's family lived at their home in Nice, an area less affected by the war than northern France. Although there were no tournaments, Lenglen had plenty of opportunity to train in Nice. Soldiers came to the Riviera to temporarily avoid the war, including leading tennis players such as two-time United States national champions R. Norris Williams and Clarence Griffin. These players competed in charity exhibitions primarily in Cannes to raise money for the French Red Cross. Lenglen participated and had the opportunity to play singles matches against male players.

=== 1919: Classic Wimbledon final ===
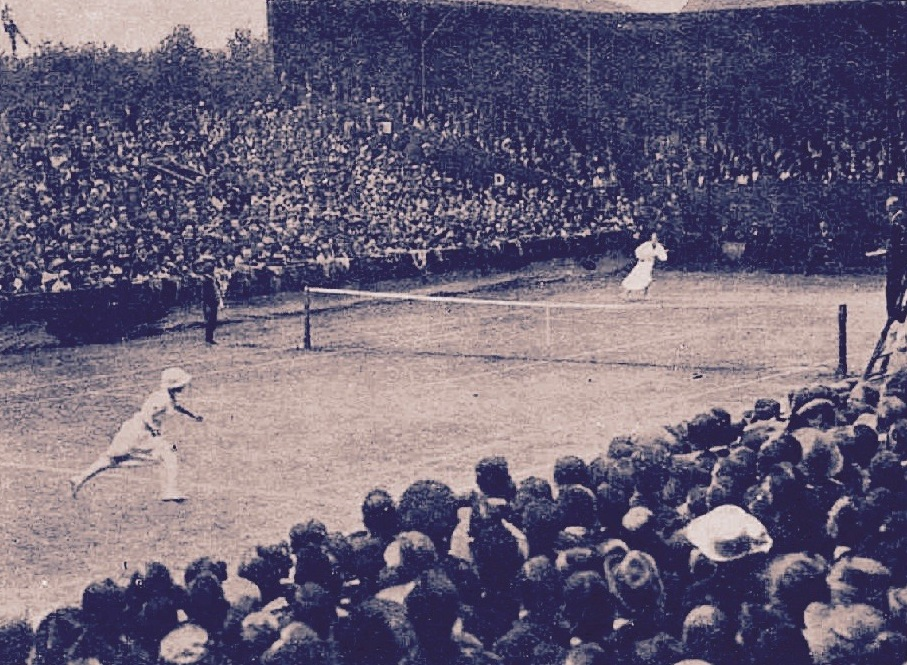
Lenglen (near court) and Lambert Chambers contesting the 1919 Wimbledon final

Many tournaments resumed in 1919, following the end of World War I. Lenglen won nine singles titles in ten events, all four of her doubles events, and eight mixed doubles titles in ten events. She won the South of France Championships in March without dropping a game in any of her four matches. Although the French Championships and World Hard Court Championships did not return until the following year, Lenglen was able to debut at Wimbledon in July. She won the six-round All Comers' bracket, losing only six games in the first four rounds. Her biggest challenge in the All Comers' competition was her doubles partner Ryan, who saved match points and levelled the second set of their semifinal at five games, losing only after an hour-long rain delay. Although the 20-year-old Lenglen was considered a favourite against the 40-year-old Lambert Chambers in the challenge round, Lambert Chambers was able to trouble Lenglen with well-placed drop shots. Lenglen won the first set 10–8 after both players saved two set points. After saving two match points, Lenglen won the third set 9–7 for her first Wimbledon title. The match set the record for most games in a Wimbledon women's singles final with 44, since surpassed only by the 1970 final between Margaret Court and Billie Jean King. More than 8,000 people attended the match, well above the seating capacity of 3,500 on Centre Court. Lenglen defeated Lambert Chambers and Ethel Larcombe again in the doubles final with Ryan. She already lost to Ryan and Randolph Lycett in her mixed doubles quarterfinal, her only loss of the year in any discipline aside from defaults.

=== 1920: Olympic champion ===
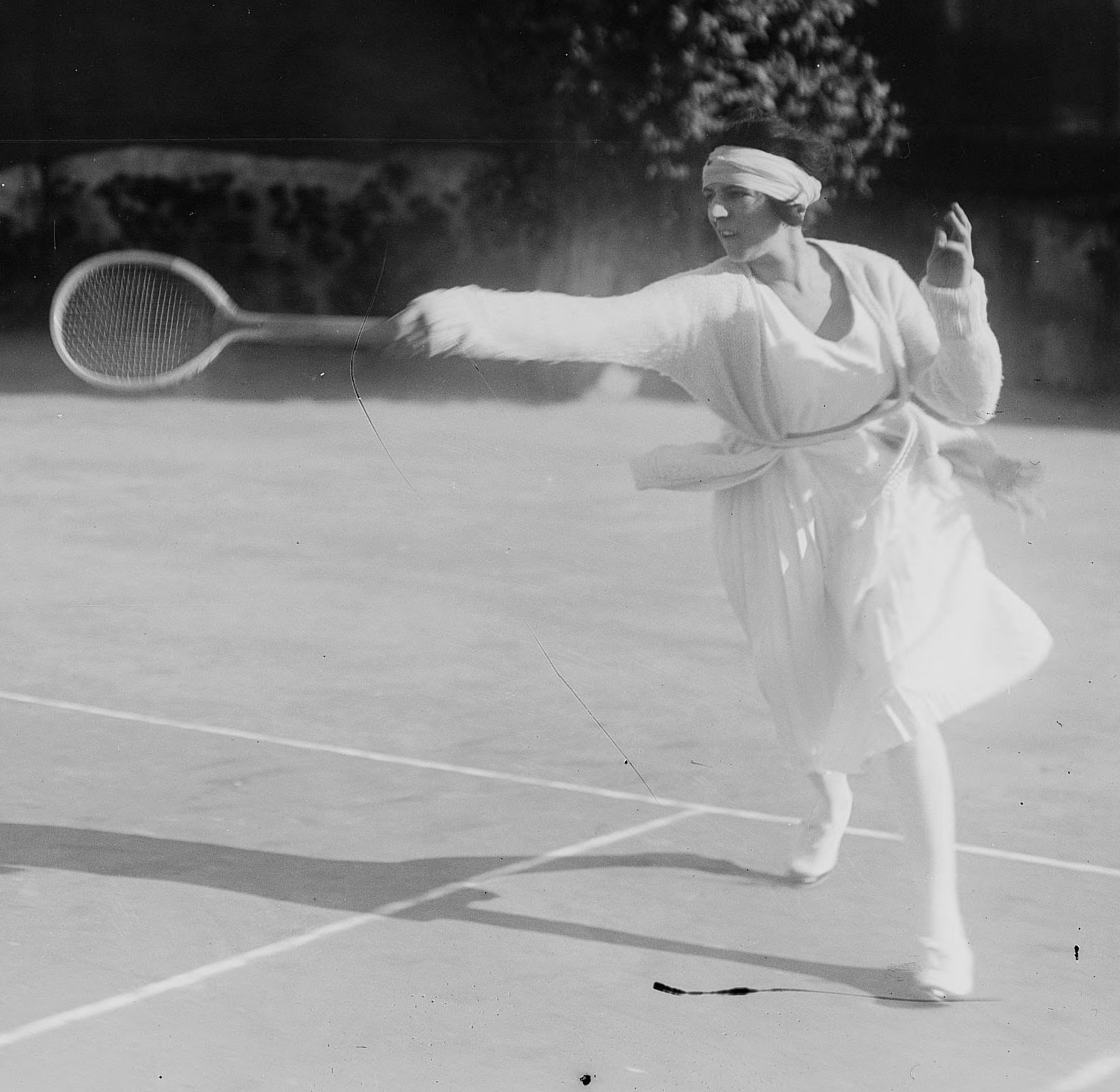
Lenglen at Cannes in 1920

Lenglen began 1920 with five singles titles on the Riviera, three of which she won in lopsided finals against Ryan. However, Ryan was able to defeat Lenglen in mixed doubles at Cannes in windy conditions, Lenglen's only mixed doubles loss of the year. Although the World Hard Court Championships returned in May, Lenglen withdrew due to illness. She recovered in time for the French Championships two weeks later and won the singles, doubles, and mixed doubles titles to complete a triple crown. Lenglen easily made it to the challenge round in singles, where she defeated Broquedis in a rematch of the 1914 final. She won the doubles event with Élisabeth d'Ayen and defended her mixed doubles title with Decugis, only needing to play the challenge round.

Lenglen's next event was Wimbledon. Lambert Chambers won the All Comers' final to set up a rematch of the previous year's final. Although the match was expected to be close again and began 2–2, Lenglen won ten of the last eleven games for her second consecutive Wimbledon singles title. She won the triple crown, taking the doubles with Ryan and the mixed doubles with Australian Gerald Patterson. The doubles final was also a rematch of the previous year's final against Lambert Chambers and Larcombe, and the mixed doubles victory came against defending champions Ryan and Lycett. Lenglen's decision to partner with Patterson led to the Fédération Française de Lawn Tennis (FFLT) threatening to not pay her expenses for the Wimbledon trip unless she partnered with a compatriot. Lenglen and her father replied by paying for the trip themselves. After Wimbledon, Lenglen won both of her events in Belgium in the lead-up to the Olympic Games in Antwerp. At the Olympics, Lenglen won two gold medals and one bronze medal for France. She won the singles title over British player Dorothy Holman, losing only four games in the entire event. She won mixed doubles with Decugis, overcoming an opening set loss in their quarterfinal. Lenglen partnered with d'Ayen again in the doubles event, losing their semifinal to Kathleen McKane and Winifred McNair in a tight match that ended 8–6 in the decisive third set. This match was Lenglen's only loss in doubles all year. Their opponents in the bronze medal match defaulted.

=== 1921: Only singles defeat post-World War I ===
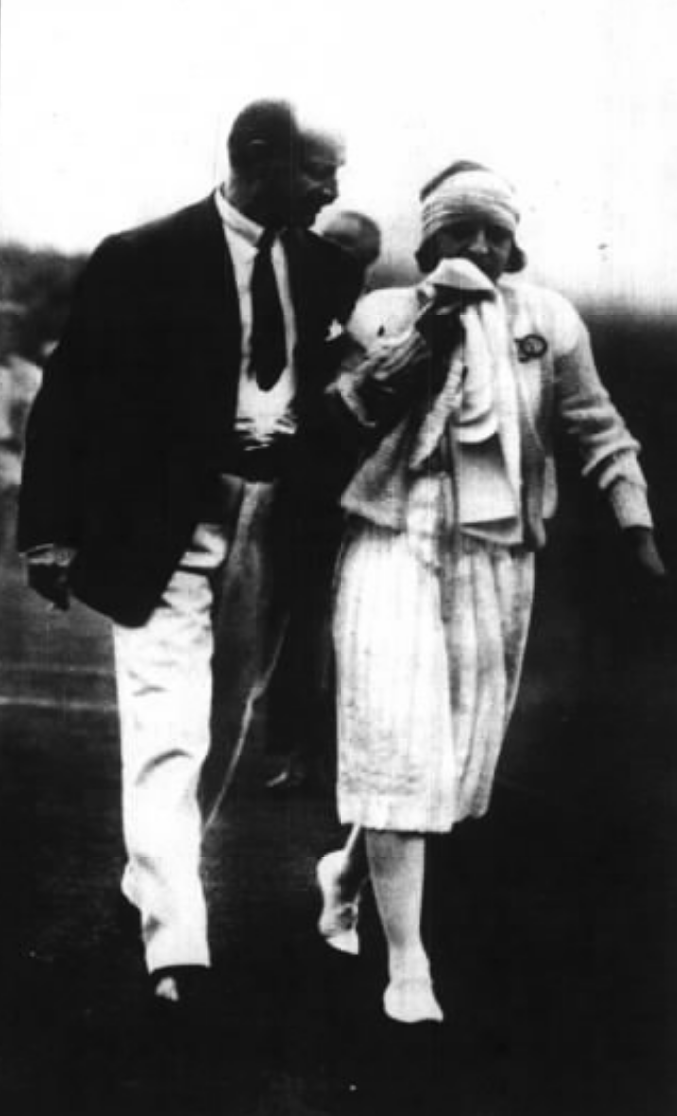
Lenglen walking off the court after retiring against Mallory

Lenglen again dominated the tournaments on the Riviera in 1921, winning eight titles in singles, six in doubles, and seven in mixed doubles. Her only loss came in mixed doubles. She won all of her matches against Ryan, four in singles and five in mixed doubles. All of Lenglen's doubles titles on the Riviera were with Ryan.

Lenglen defended her triple crown at the French Championships. Later that month, she returned to the World Hard Court Championships, where five-time United States national singles champion Molla Mallory was making her debut. The United States Lawn Tennis Association (USLTA) sent Mallory and Bill Tilden to the tournament with the hope of drawing Lenglen over to compete in the United States. Although Lenglen defeated Mallory in the final in straight sets, she trailed 2–3 in the second set before winning the last four games. Lenglen won the triple crown at the tournament, partnering with Golding in doubles and Jacques Brugnon in mixed doubles. She then won her third consecutive Wimbledon titles in both singles and doubles, defeating her doubles partner Ryan in a lopsided singles final. She withdrew from the mixed doubles event after her partner suffered an ankle injury.

Lenglen planned to compete at the U.S. National Championships in August to prove she deserved to be called a world champion. Due to illness delaying her trip, however, she did not make it to New York until three days before her opening match and was still sick when she arrived. After Lenglen's opening round opponent defaulted, the tournament rescheduled her second round match against Mallory for that night to appease the large crowd that showed up to see Lenglen play. With more than 8,000 people in attendance, Mallory took a 2–0 lead in the first set before Lenglen began coughing in the third game. After losing the first set, Lenglen retired from the match two points into the second set for her only singles loss after World War I. She played only two more matches in the United States, both small exhibitions, before leaving in late September.

=== 1922: Start of 179-match win streak ===
During the 1922 season, Lenglen did not lose a match in any discipline other than by default. She did not return to competitive tennis until March, six months after her loss to Mallory. Lenglen's first tournament back was the South of France Championships, where she won the doubles and mixed doubles titles. She did not play the singles event and did not play singles again until a month later at the Beausoleil Championships in Monte Carlo, where she won the title without dropping a game. This tournament began a 179-match win streak that Lenglen continued through the end of her amateur career.

In the middle of the year, Lenglen won triple crowns at the World Hard Court Championships, the French Championships, and Wimbledon. At the first, she saved two set points in her semifinal against McKane before winning the set 10–8. Needing to play only three challenge round matches at the French, Lenglen agreed to forgo the challenge round system at Wimbledon and be included in the main draw at the request of the tournament organisers. In the singles final, she faced Mallory in a rematch of their U.S. National Championship meeting. Like in the United States, Mallory won the first two games of the final. However, Lenglen rebounded and won the next twelve games for the title. The final remains the shortest in Wimbledon history, lasting only 26 minutes.

=== 1923: Career-best 45 titles ===
Lenglen entered more events and won more titles in 1923 than any other year. She won all 16 of the singles events she entered, as well as 13 of 14 doubles events, and 16 of 18 mixed doubles events. Unlike previous years, she did not default a match in any discipline. At the beginning of the season, Mallory travelled to France to make her debut on the French Riviera circuit. Lenglen and Mallory had their last encounter at the South of France Championships, which Mallory entered after not performing well at her other two events on the Riviera. Lenglen defeated her without losing a game. At the same tournament, Lenglen's twelve-month win streak across all disciplines came to an end with a mixed doubles loss to Ryan and Lycett.

At what was to be the last edition of the World Hard Court Championships, Lenglen faced McKane in the final in each event, all three of which were held in the same afternoon. She defeated McKane in singles and mixed doubles, the latter of which was with Henri Cochet as her partner for the second consecutive year. With Ryan absent, however, Lenglen partnered with Golding and lost to the British team of McKane and Geraldine Beamish. At the French Championships, Lenglen defended her triple crown without losing a set in spite of the challenge round format being abandoned. She partnered with Brugnon in mixed doubles for the third straight year, and paired with Julie Vlasto for the first time in doubles. She faced the most adversity in the singles final when the crowd uncharacteristically booed her for trailing 0–4 to Golding in the second set. At Wimbledon, Lenglen won the singles and doubles titles with ease, never dropping more than three games in a set. In mixed doubles, however, she was defeated by Ryan and Lycett for the second time in the year. In September, Lenglen travelled outside of France and won titles in Belgium, Spain, and Portugal.

=== 1924: No major titles ===
Although Lenglen did not lose a match in any discipline in 1924 except by default, she did not win a major tournament for the first time since 1913 aside from her hiatus due to World War I. Minor illnesses limited her to three singles events on the Riviera. Lenglen played doubles more regularly, winning eight titles in both doubles and mixed doubles. In April, Lenglen travelled to Spain to compete at the Barcelona International. Although she won all three events, she contracted jaundice soon after, preventing her from playing the French Championships. Although she had not fully recovered by Wimbledon, she entered the tournament and won her first three singles matches without dropping a game. In the next round, however, Ryan proved to be a more difficult opponent and took the second set from Lenglen 8–6, only the third set of singles Lenglen had lost since World War I. Although Lenglen narrowly won the match, she then withdrew from the tournament following the advice of her doctor. She did not play another event the rest of the year, and in particular missed the Olympic Games in Paris, where Helen Wills won the women's singles event.

=== 1925: Open French champion ===
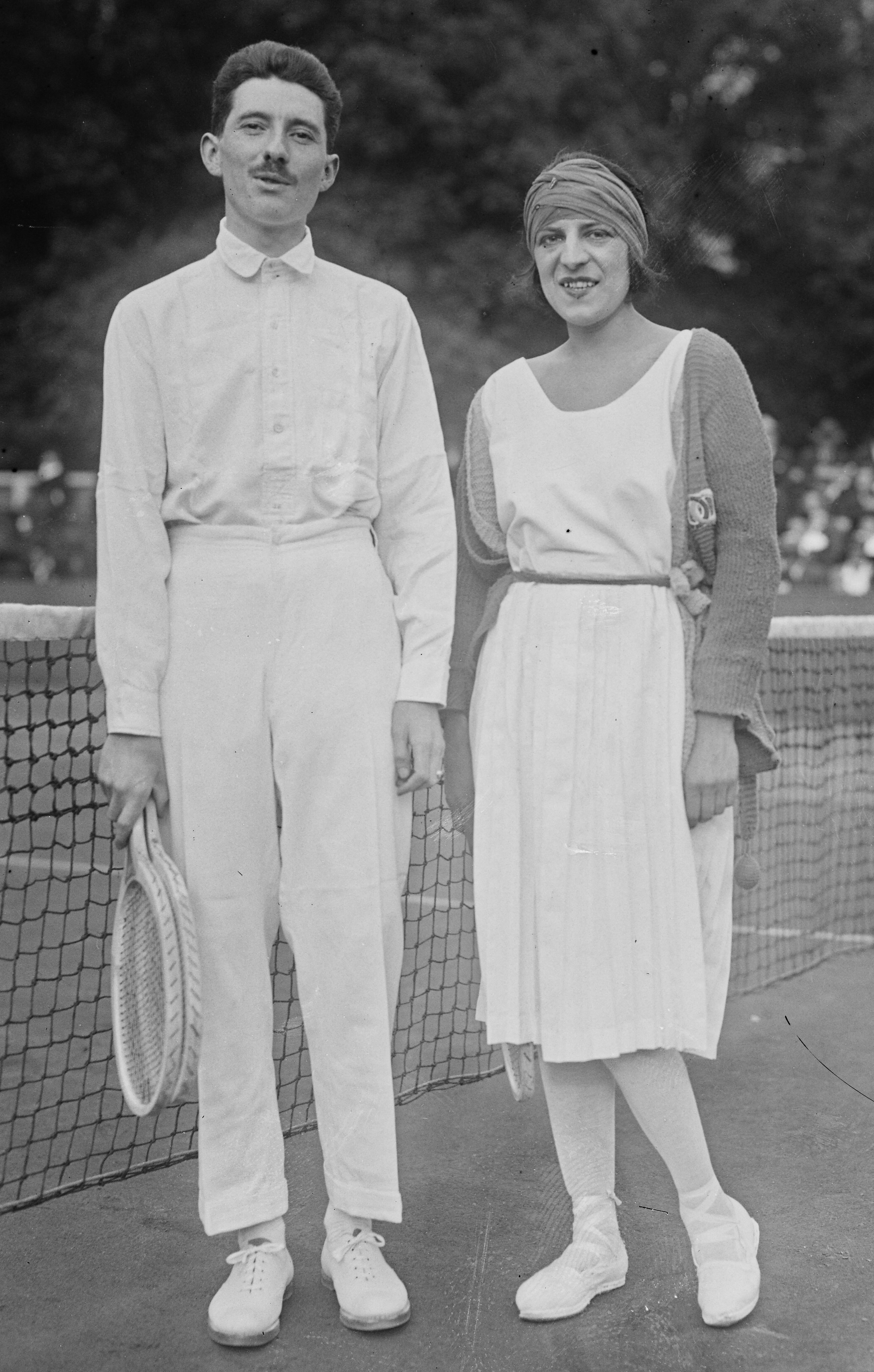
Lenglen won five mixed doubles titles at the French Championships with Jacques Brugnon, including the first two open to international players.

Lenglen returned to tennis at the Beau Site New Year Meeting in Cannes the first week of the year, winning in doubles with Ryan in her only event. She played singles at only two tournaments on the Riviera, including the South of France Championships. Her only loss during this part of the season was to Ryan and Umberto de Morpurgo at the Côte d'Azur Championships in Cannes. In May, Lenglen entered the French Championships, the inaugural edition open to international players. The tournament was played at St. Cloud at the site of the defunct World Hard Court Championships. Lenglen won the triple crown and was not challenged in singles or mixed doubles. She won the singles final over McKane, losing only three games. She won the mixed doubles final with Brugnon against her doubles partner Julie Vlasto and Cochet. Although Lenglen and Vlasto lost the second set of the doubles final 9–11 to McKane and Evelyn Colyer, they won the other two sets with ease for the title.

Lenglen followed her performance at the French Championships with another triple crown at Wimbledon. She played five singles matches and did not lose a game in the second set of any of them. The five games she dropped in total remain a record for fewest games lost in a singles title run in Wimbledon history. Her opponents included Ryan in her opening match, the defending champion McKane in the semifinals, and Joan Fry in the final. In mixed doubles, she partnered with Jean Borotra to defeat Ryan and de Morpurgo in the final. In doubles, Lenglen and Ryan played their last tournament together and won the title without dropping a set. During the last part of the year, Lenglen led France to a 7–4 victory in a tie against Australia, and defeated Australasian champion Daphne Akhurst in the final of the concurrent Deauville tournament. Later in the year, Lenglen won the doubles and mixed doubles events at the Cromer Covered Courts Championships, the only time she played in England other than Wimbledon and her only indoor wood tournament.

=== 1926: Match of the Century ===
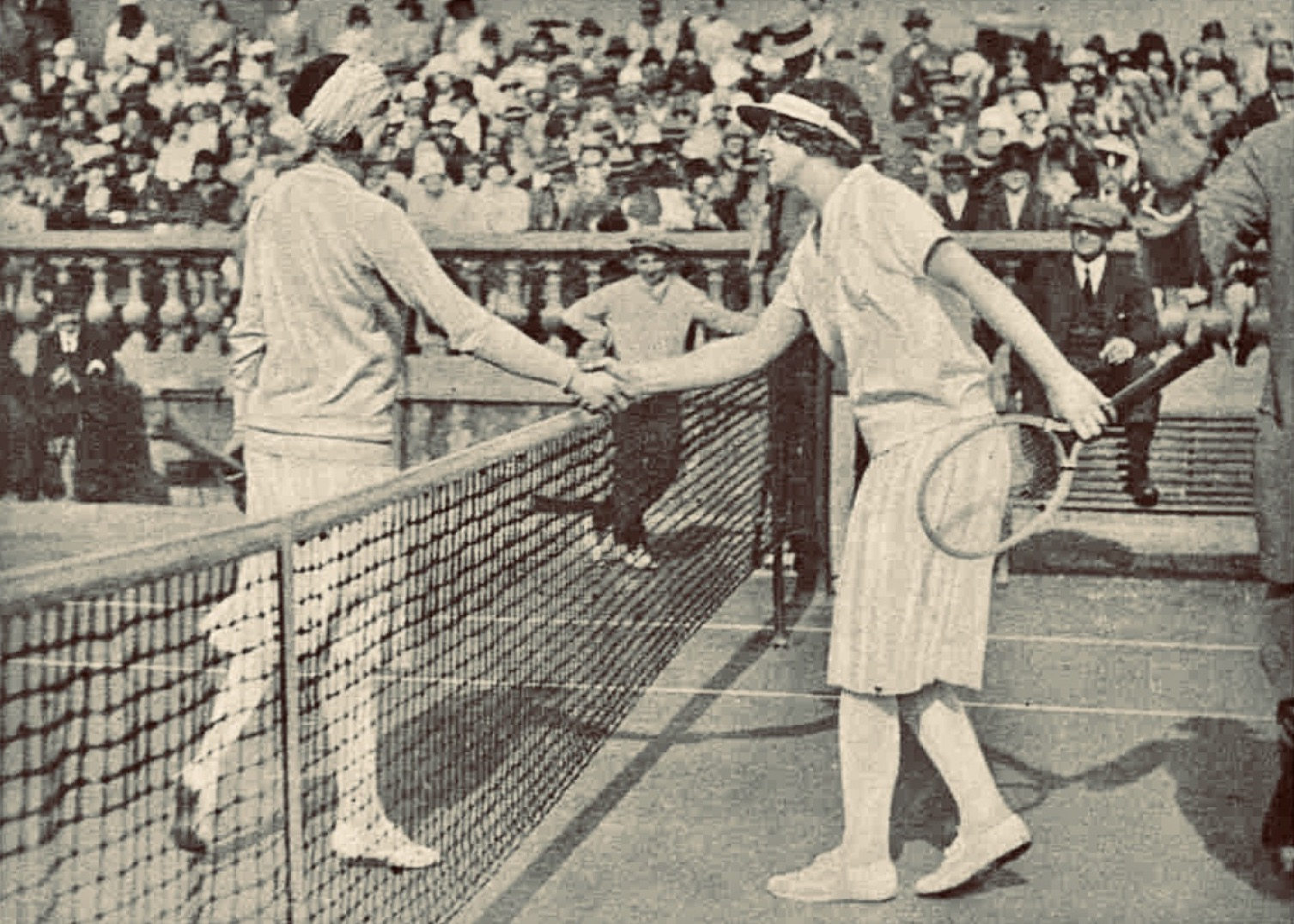
Lenglen (left) and Helen Wills mistakenly shake hands near the end of the Match of the Century while an official's hand (far right) indicates the match is not over.

The 1926 season unexpectedly was Lenglen's last as an amateur. At the beginning of the season, three-time reigning U.S. national champion Helen Wills travelled to the French Riviera with the hope of playing a match against Lenglen. With Wills's level of stardom approaching that of Lenglen's, there was an immense amount of hype for a match between them to take place. They entered the same singles draw only once, at the Carlton Club in Cannes. When Lenglen and Wills both made the final with little opposition, the club doubled the number of seats around their main court and all three thousand seats plus standing room sold out. Spectators unable to get into the venue attempted to watch the match by climbing trees and ladders or by purchasing unofficial tickets for the windows and roofs of villas across the street. In what was called the Match of the Century, Lenglen defeated Wills in straight sets. The first match point became chaotic when a winner from Wills was called out by a spectator, leading everyone but the officials to believe the match was over. Photographers captured the moment as the players shook hands at the net and the crowd began flooding the court. After clarification that the shot had been in, Wills broke Lenglen to level the set. Despite Lenglen's winning, her reputation of being unbeatable was damaged by Wills's competitive performance.

While Wills remained in France, Lenglen avoided a rematch on the Riviera. After Wills's season was marred by an appendectomy during the French Championships, she withdrew from both Grand Slam tournaments in Europe and another match between her and Lenglen never took place. In Wills's absence, Lenglen defended all three of her titles at the French Championships with ease, defeating Mary Browne in the singles final. She again won the doubles with Vlasto and the mixed doubles with Brugnon.

==== Wimbledon misunderstanding ====
Although Lenglen was a heavy favourite at Wimbledon with Wills not participating, she began the tournament facing two issues. She was concerned with her family's finances as her father's health was worsening, and she was not content with the FFLT wanting her to enter the doubles event with a French partner instead of her usual partner Ryan. Although Lenglen agreed to play with Vlasto as the FFLT wanted, she was unsettled by being drawn against Ryan in her opening doubles match.

Lenglen's situation did not improve once the tournament began. She opened the singles event with an uncharacteristic win against Browne in which she lost five games, the same number she had lost in the entire 1925 singles event. Her next singles match was then moved before her doubles match to accommodate the royal family, who planned to be in attendance. Wanting to play doubles first, Lenglen asked for the match to be rescheduled. Although the request was never received, she arrived at the grounds late. After Wimbledon officials confronted her in anger over keeping Queen Mary waiting, she refused to play. The club ultimately adhered to Lenglen's wishes and rescheduled both matches with the doubles first. Nonetheless, Lenglen and Vlasto were defeated by Ryan and Browne in three sets while the crowd who typically supported Lenglen turned against her. Although she defeated Evelyn Dewhurst in the rescheduled singles match, she then withdrew from both singles and mixed doubles, ending her last amateur tournament.

== Professional career ==
=== United States tour (1926–27) ===
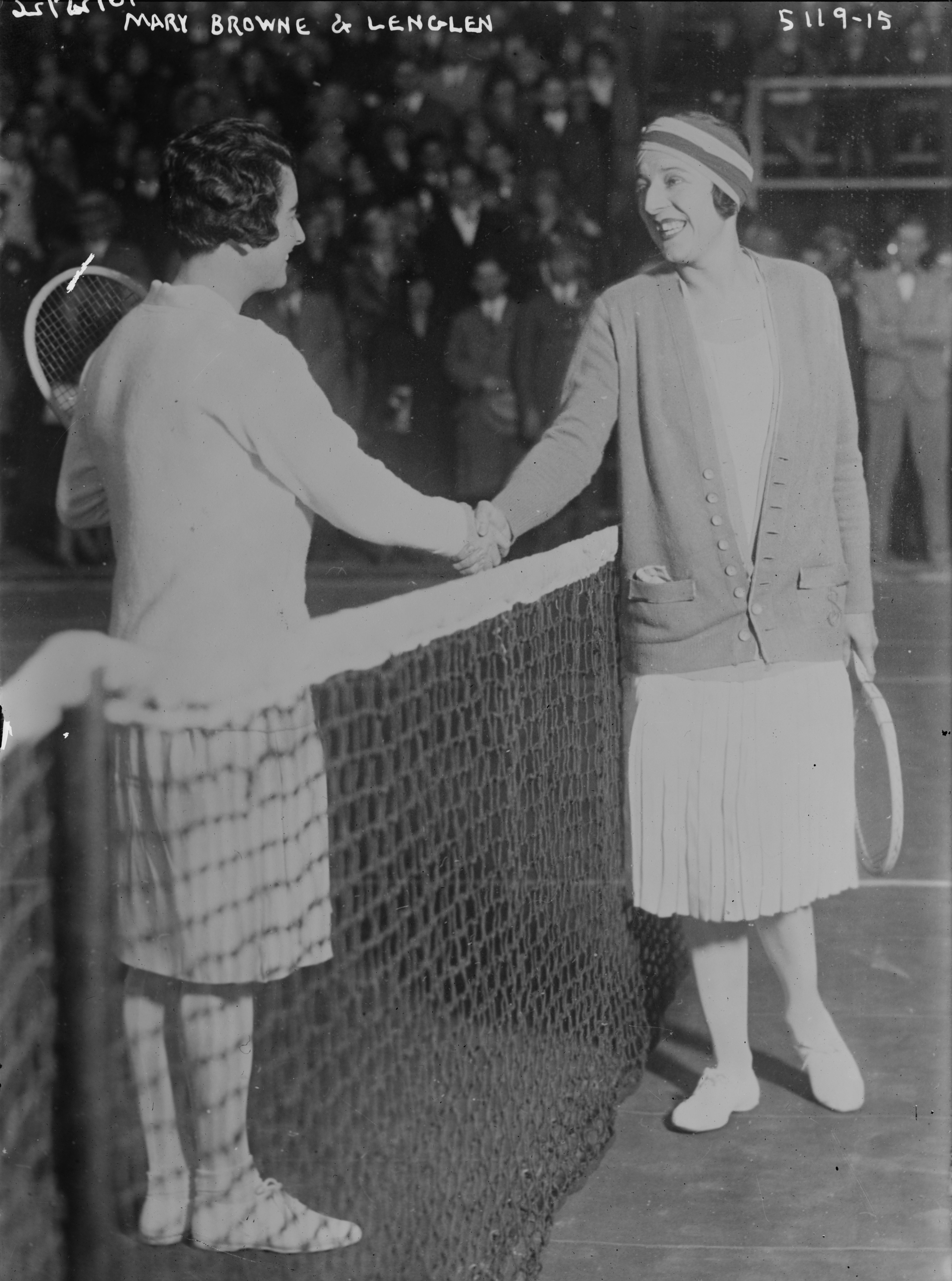
Lenglen (right) shaking hands with Mary Browne during the United States professional tour

A month after her withdrawal from Wimbledon, Lenglen signed a $50,000 contract (equivalent to about $890,000 in 2020) with American sports promoter C. C. Pyle to headline a four-month professional tour in the United States beginning in October 1926. She had begun discussing a professional contract with Pyle's associate William Pickens when he visited her on the Riviera in April. Lenglen had previously turned down an offer of 200,000 francs (equivalent to about $130,000 in 2020) (Note: The conversion rate was about 25 francs to 1 U.S. dollar.) to turn professional in the United States following her last victory over Molla Mallory in 1923, declining in large part to keep her amateur status. She became less concerned with that, however, after the crowd turned against her at Wimbledon. She was more interested in keeping her social status, and was convinced by Pyle that turning professional would not hurt her stardom or damage her reputation. With Lenglen on the tour, Pyle attempted to recruit other top players, including Wills, McKane, and leading Americans Bill Tilden and Bill Johnston. Although they all declined, Pyle was able to sign Mary Browne as well as men's players Vincent Richards, Paul Féret, Howard Kinsey, and Harvey Snodgrass. Richards was regarded as the biggest star among the male players, having won gold medals in singles and doubles at the 1924 Olympics. Once the tour began, Lenglen and all of the other players lost their amateur status.

Although professional tennis tournaments already existed, the tour was the first travelling professional exhibition series in tennis history. It featured 40 stops, starting on 9 October 1926 and ending on 14 February 1927, and included several stops in Canada as well as one in Cuba. Lenglen dominated Browne on the tour, winning all 33 of the best-of-three-set matches played to completion. Browne did not win a set until the second set at the 33rd stop. The only other set she won was the only set they played at the 36th stop, where Lenglen had decided to play just a one-set match while ill to avoid disappointing the fans. Browne also nearly won a set at the 23rd stop, losing 9–11, at which point Lenglen decided not to continue. (Note: As the tour was an exhibition, Lenglen did not need to officially retire to end the match early.)

The tour was a financial success. Lenglen earned the most money, receiving half of the revenue from ticket sales and $100,000 in total, more than the $70,000 that Babe Ruth earned in 1927 as the highest-paid player in Major League Baseball. The average attendance was just over four thousand at the 34 venues where it was recorded. The most well-attended venues were opening night at Madison Square Garden in New York City with an attendance of thirteen thousand and the Public Auditorium in Cleveland with an attendance of ten thousand. Opening night in particular brought in $34,000 from tickets sold at $1.50 to $5.50 (equivalent to $27 to $98 in 2020).

=== British tour (1927) ===
A few months after the end of the United States tour, Lenglen signed with British promoter Charles Cochran to headline a shorter professional tour in the United Kingdom. Cochran recruited Dora Köring, the 1912 Olympic silver medalist in singles, and Dewhurst to play against Lenglen. Karel Koželuh and Kinsey were the male players on the tour. There were seven tour stops, all in July 1927. Lenglen won all seven of her singles matches, never losing more than five games in any of them. The last three stops were played on the grounds of association football clubs: Queen's Park in Glasgow, Blackpool, and Manchester United. These were the best attended events on the tour and the final match at Old Trafford had an attendance of over fifteen thousand, the highest between either professional tour.

=== Aftermath ===
Lenglen was widely criticised for her decision to turn professional. Once the tour began, the FFLT expelled her and Féret while the All England Lawn Tennis Club revoked her membership. Lenglen in turn criticised amateur tennis for her nearing poverty. In the program for the United States professional tour, she stated, "In the twelve years I have been champion I have earned literally millions of francs for tennis ... And in my whole lifetime I have not earned $5,000 – not one cent of that by my specialty, my life study – tennis ... I am twenty-seven and not wealthy – should I embark on any other career and leave the one for which I have what people call genius? Or should I smile at the prospect of actual poverty and continue to earn a fortune – for whom?" She criticised the barriers that typically prevented ordinary people from becoming tennis players, stating, "Under these absurd and antiquated amateur rulings, only a wealthy person can compete, and the fact of the matter is that only wealthy people do compete. Is that fair? Does it advance the sport?" Lenglen did not participate in any other professional tours after 1927. She never formally applied to be reinstated as an amateur with the FFLT either. She had asked about the possibility in 1932 after Féret was reinstated, but was told to wait another three years and decided against it.

== Rivalries ==
=== Lenglen vs. Mallory ===
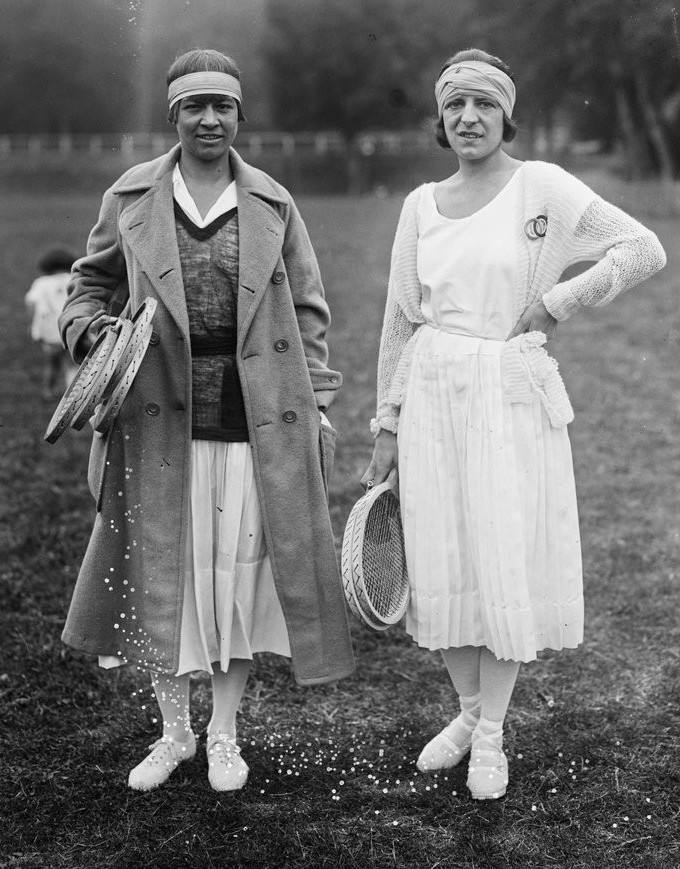
Molla Mallory (left) with Lenglen

Molla Mallory was the only player to defeat Lenglen in singles after World War I. Fifteen years older than Lenglen and originally from Norway, Mallory won a bronze medal at the 1912 Olympic Games before emigrating to the United States in 1914. While World War I halted tennis in Europe, Mallory established herself as the top-ranked American player, winning the first four U.S. National Championships she entered from 1915 through 1918. Whereas Lenglen regularly came to the net and had an all-court game built around control rather than power, the much older Mallory played almost exclusively from the baseline. The strengths of Mallory's game were that she took the ball early and had one of the most powerful forehands in women's tennis at the time. Mallory had a similar personality to Lenglen off the court. While they each hated losing, both of them smoked regularly and loved to dance. Lenglen faced Mallory just four times in singles, compiling a 3–1 record. She also won both of their doubles and mixed doubles encounters.

Their first two meetings were highlighted by Lenglen's health issues. In the final of the 1921 World Hard Court Championships, Lenglen nearly retired while struggling with blisters on her foot and trailing in the second set. Nonetheless, Lenglen proceeded to win by following her plan to play defensively and wait for Mallory to make unforced errors on attempted winners. In their second meeting at the 1921 U.S. National Championships, Mallory was able to take advantage of Lenglen's poor health, executing her usual strategy of going for winners to win the match. Although they had entered the doubles event as partners, Lenglen's health prevented them from playing any matches together at the tournament. Lenglen was able to easily win their last two meetings in 1922 and 1923 by playing more aggressively and employing Mallory's strategy of hitting well-placed winners from the baseline.

The press built the rivalry between Lenglen and Mallory. After Lenglen's retirement against Mallory at the U.S. National Championships, the vast majority of American newspapers criticised Lenglen for not finishing the match and accused her of retiring because she did not think she could win. They coined a phrase "cough and quit" that became popular at the time for describing someone who needed an excuse to avoid losing. After Lenglen's victory over Mallory at Wimbledon, the American press returned to supporting Lenglen. Both Lenglen and Mallory believed the newspapers exaggerated the personal nature of their rivalry. Mallory in particular said, "The newspapers are the dirtiest, filthiest things that ever happened. I don't want my name in the newspapers. I have a better chance on the courts than in the newspapers of my own country."

=== Lenglen and Ryan ===
Lenglen's usual doubles partner Elizabeth Ryan was also her most frequent opponent in singles. Born in the United States, Ryan travelled to England in 1912 to visit her sister before deciding to stay there permanently. Although she lost all four of her appearances in major finals, Ryan won 26 major titles between doubles and mixed doubles. The biggest strength of her game was volleying. Tennis writer Ted Tinling said, "volleying as a fundamental, aggressive technique was first injected into the women's game by Ryan." Lenglen and Ryan first partnered together at a handicap event in Monte Carlo in 1913 when they were 13 and 20 years old respectively. After losing the final at that tournament, the two of them never lost a regular doubles match, only once dropping a set in 1923 to Dorothea Lambert Chambers and Kathleen McKane, again at Monte Carlo. Ryan was Lenglen's doubles partner for 40 of her 74 doubles titles, including all six at Wimbledon and two of three at the World Hard Court Championships.

Ryan defeated Lenglen in their first singles meeting in straight sets at Monte Carlo in 1914 and also won a set in their second meeting two months later. Following their first encounter, Lenglen won all 17 of their remaining matches, including five at Wimbledon and two major finals. The only time Ryan won a set against Lenglen after World War I was in the quarterfinals at Wimbledon in 1924, where Lenglen withdrew due to illness in the following round. When the FFLT asked Lenglen to take a French partner in doubles at Wimbledon in 1926, Ryan partnered with Mary Browne to defeat Lenglen and her new partner Julie Vlasto, coming from three match points down in the second set. Ryan also won their only other doubles meeting in 1914. In mixed doubles, Lenglen compiled a 23–9 record against Ryan. Half of her career mixed doubles losses were to Ryan. After losing their first six encounters, she recovered to win the next thirteen. Lenglen won her first mixed doubles match against Ryan at the 1920 Beaulieu tournament, starting a win streak that ended with a loss to Ryan and Lycett at the 1923 South of France Championships.

=== Overlap with Wills ===
Helen Wills was the closest to becoming Lenglen's counterpart. Wills finished her career with 19 Grand Slam singles titles, a record that stood until 1970. She succeeded Lenglen as world No. 1 in 1927 and kept that ranking for the next six years and nine of the next twelve overall until 1938. Late in Lenglen's amateur career, Wills had built a similar level of stardom to Lenglen by winning the 1924 Olympic gold medal in singles in Lenglen's absence while still only 18 years old. Although their careers overlapped when Wills visited Europe in 1924 and 1926, Lenglen faced Wills only once in her career. Lenglen withdrew from Wimbledon and the Olympics due to jaundice in 1924, and Wills withdrew from the French Championships and Wimbledon in 1926 due to appendicitis, preventing a longer rivalry between tennis's two biggest female stars of the 1920s from emerging.

== Playing style ==
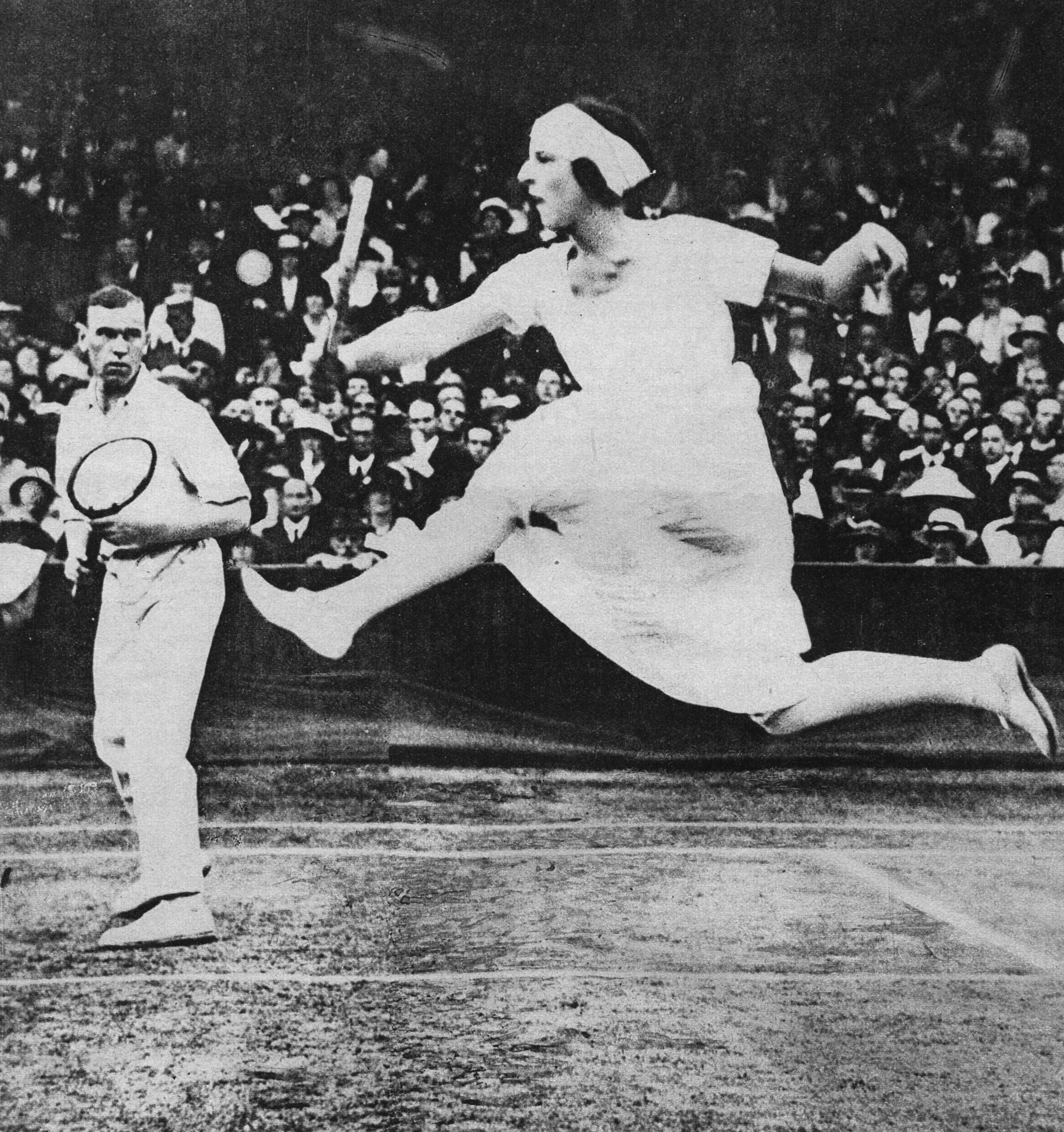
Lenglen leaping balletically to hit a volley

Describing Lenglen's all-court style of play, Elizabeth Ryan said: "[Lenglen] owned every kind of shot, plus a genius for knowing how and when to use them. She never gave an opponent the same kind of shot twice in a row. She'd make you run miles ... her game was all placement and deception and steadiness. I had the best drop shot anybody ever had, but she could not only get up to it but was so fast that often she could score a placement off it." Her rivals Molla Mallory and Helen Wills both noted that Lenglen excelled at extending rallies and could take control of points with defensive shots. Although Lenglen built her game around control rather than power, she had the ability to hit powerful shots. In particular, Mallory praised the power behind her defensive shots, saying, "She is just the steadiest player that ever was. She just sent back at me whatever I sent at her and waited for me to make a fault. And her returns often enough were harder than the shots I sent up to her." British journalist A. E. Crawley regarded her as having the best movement of her time, saying, "I have never seen on a lawn tennis court either man or woman move with such mechanical and artistic perfection and poise. Whether [Lenglen's] objective is the ball or merely changing sides, she reminded you of the movement of fire over prairie grass." He believed she was a powerful server and an aggressive volleyer, commenting, "She serves with all the male athlete's power. She smashes with the same loose and rapid action, the release of a spring of steel. Her volley is not a timid push, but an arrow from the bow. And an arrow from the bow is Suzanne herself."

Adopting a style of play drawn from men's players led Lenglen to become one of the leading volleyers in women's tennis at a time when the women's game was centred around playing from the baseline, even for the top players. Lenglen aimed to come to the net to finish points quickly whenever possible. Kathleen McKane specifically noted that "Suzanne volleyed like a man" when describing her influence on women's tennis. While Lenglen did not model the majority of her game after any specific player, she modelled her forehand after that of Anthony Wilding. Like Wilding, she aimed to hit forehands flat and with little to no topspin. She used a continental grip and strived to hit balls early on the rise. Lenglen wrote in her book Lawn Tennis for Girls: "A favorite shot of mine is the backhand down the line". Lenglen was regarded as having a graceful style of play. Her movement was thought to resemble that of a dancer, a style that may have arisen from a course on classic Greek dance she had taken as a child. René Lacoste, a leading French men's tennis player from her era, said, "[Lenglen] played with marvelous ease the simplest strokes in the world. It was only after several games that I understood what harmony was concealed by her simplicity, what wonderful mental and physical balance was hidden by the facility of her play."

Lenglen developed a reputation for drinking cognac to help her play at pivotal points of her biggest matches. Most notably, she did so during the second and third sets of her victory against Lambert Chambers in the 1919 Wimbledon final, and at the start and during the more competitive second set of her victory over Helen Wills in the Match of the Century. She travelled to the U.S. National Championships in 1921 only after the USLTA agreed to supply her with alcohol during her stay even though its sale was illegal under the laws of Prohibition at the time. Nonetheless, they did not provide Lenglen with alcohol during her retirement loss to Mallory.

== Legacy ==
=== Achievements ===
Lenglen was ranked as the 24th greatest player in history in the 100 Greatest of All Time television series. She was the ninth-highest ranked woman overall, and the highest-ranked woman to play exclusively in the amateur era. After formal annual women's tennis rankings began to be published by tennis journalist and player A. Wallis Myers in 1921, Lenglen was No. 1 in the world in each of the first six editions of the rankings through her retirement from amateur tennis in 1926. She won a total of 250 titles consisting of 83 in singles, 74 in doubles, and 93 in mixed doubles. Nine of her singles titles were won without losing a game. Lenglen compiled win percentages of 97.9% in singles and 96.9% across all disciplines. After World War I, she won 287 of 288 singles matches, starting with a 108-match win streak and ending with a 179-match win streak, the latter of which was longer than Helen Wills's longest win streak of 161 matches. Lenglen ended her career on a 250-match win streak on clay.

Lenglen's eight Grand Slam women's singles titles are tied for the tenth-most all-time, and tied for fourth in the amateur era behind only Maureen Connolly's nine, Court's thirteen, and Wills's nineteen. Aside from the 1919 Wimbledon Championships, Lenglen did not lose more than three games in a set in any of her other Grand Slam or World Hard Court Championship singles finals. Lenglen's six Wimbledon titles are tied for the sixth-most in history. Her former record of five consecutive Wimbledon titles has since been matched only by Martina Navratilova, who won her sixth in a row in 1987. Lenglen's title at the 1914 World Hard Court Championships made her the youngest major champion in tennis history at 15 years and 16 days old, nearly a year ahead of the next two youngest, Martina Hingis and Lottie Dod. (Note: Lottie Dod and Martina Hingis are respectively recognised as the youngest Grand Slam singles champion and youngest Grand Slam champion overall by virtue of the World Hard Court Championships not being one of the four modern Grand Slam tournaments.)

Lenglen won a total of 17 titles at Wimbledon, 19 at the French Championships, and 10 at the World Hard Court Championships across all disciplines. Lenglen completed three Wimbledon triple crowns – winning the singles, doubles, and mixed doubles events at a tournament in the same year – in 1920, 1922, and 1925. She also won two triple crowns at the World Hard Court Championships in 1921 and 1922, and six at the French Championships, the first four of which came consecutively from 1920 through 1923 when the tournament was invitation-only to French nationals and the last two of which came in 1925 and 1926 when the tournament was open to internationals.

=== Mythical persona ===
Following World War I, Lenglen became a symbol of national pride in France in a country looking to recover from the war. The French press referred to Lenglen as notre Suzanne (our Suzanne) to characterise her status as a national heroine; and more eminently as La Divine (The Goddess) to assert her unassailability. The press wrote about Lenglen as if she were infallible at tennis, often attributing any performance that was relatively poor by her standards to various excuses such as the fault of her doubles partner or to having concern over the health of her father. Journalists who criticised Lenglen were condemned and refuted by the rest of the press. At the Olympics, she introduced herself to journalists as "The Great Lenglen", a title that was well received. Before matches, Lenglen would predict to the press that she was going to win, a practice that Americans treated as improper. She explained, "When I am asked a question I endeavour to give a frank answer. If I know I am going to win, what harm is there in saying so?"

Lenglen was the first female athlete to be acknowledged as a celebrity outside of her sport. She was acquainted with members of royal families such as King Gustav V of Sweden, and actresses such as Mary Pickford. She was well known by the general public, and her matches were well-attended by people not otherwise interested in tennis. Many of her biggest matches were sold out, including the 1919 Wimbledon final against Lambert Chambers, where the attendance more than doubled the seating capacity of Centre Court, and her first match against Mallory, where tickets were sold at a cost of up to 500 francs (about $330 in 2020) and an estimated five thousand people could not gain entry to see the match after it had sold out. The popularity of Lenglen's matches at Wimbledon was a large factor in the club moving the tournament from Worple Road to its modern site at Church Road. A new Centre Court opened in 1922 with a seating capacity of nearly ten thousand, nearly three times larger than that at the old venue. At the Match of the Century against Wills, seated tickets that were sold out at 300 francs, then equivalent to about $11 in the United States (or $200 in 2020), were re-sold by scalpers at up to 1200 francs, which was then about $44 (or $780 in 2020). This cost far exceeded that for the men's singles final at the U.S. National Championships at the time, which were sold at as low as $2 per seat (about $40 in 2020).

Lenglen's mythical reputation began at a young age. She was known for a story about her father training her to improve her shot precision as a child by placing a handkerchief at different locations on the court and instructing her to hit it as a target. She was said to be able to hit the handkerchief with ease regardless of the type of incoming shot. Each time she did, he would fold it in half before replacing it with a coin. It was said that Lenglen could hit the coin up to five times in a row.

=== Professional tennis ===
Lenglen was the first leading tennis player to leave amateur tennis to play professionally, thereby launching playing tennis as a professional career. The exhibition tour she headlined in the United States from 1926 to 1927 in which a few players travelled together to compete against each other across a series of venues was the first of its kind. It established a format that was repeated over twenty times for the next four decades until the start of the Open Era. With Pyle interested in tennis only because of Lenglen, Vincent Richards, the leading male player on Lenglen's United States tour, organised the next such tour featuring himself competing against Karel Koželuh in 1928. He also began organising the first major professional tournaments to feature players who had been top amateurs, beginning with the U.S. Pro Tennis Championships first held later in 1927.

As the top women's players nearly all kept their amateur status, women were largely left out of both the travelling exhibition tours and the growing professional tournaments after Lenglen's playing career ended. The next significant exhibition tour to feature women's tennis players did not occur until 1941 when Alice Marble became one of the headliners on a tour that also featured leading male players Don Budge and Bill Tilden. Fellow top-ranked players Pauline Betz and Althea Gibson followed Marble by turning professional in 1947 and 1958 respectively. Betz played on two tours, one in 1947 and another from 1950 to 1951. Gibson played in a series of warmup matches for the Harlem Globetrotters, an exhibition basketball team in the United States.

=== Women's sportswear ===
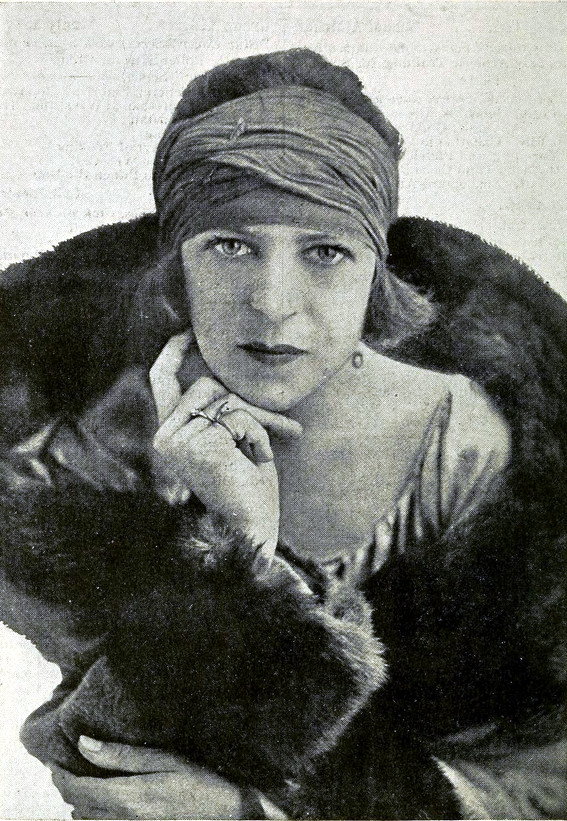
Lenglen wearing her signature bandeau and distinctive large coat

Lenglen redefined traditional women's tennis attire early in her career. By the 1919 Wimbledon final, she avoided donning a corset in favour of a short-sleeved blouse and calf-length pleated skirt to go along with a distinctive circular-brimmed bonnet, a stark contrast with her much older opponent Dorothea Lambert Chambers who wore long sleeves and a plain skirt below the calf.

The following year, Lenglen ended the norm of women competing in clothes not suited for playing tennis. She had Jean Patou design her outfits that were not only intended to be stylish, but allowed her to perform her signature leaping ballet motion in points and did not restrict her movement on the court. This type of attire was among the earliest women's sportswear. Unusual for the time, her blouse was sleeveless and her skirt extended only to her knees. Lenglen replaced the bonnet with a bandeau, which became known as the "Lenglen bandeau" and was her signature piece of attire throughout the rest of her career. On the court, she routinely wore makeup and popularised having tanned skin instead of a pale complexion that other players had preferred before her time. Later in her career, she moved away from just wearing white in favour of brighter-coloured outfits. Overall, she pioneered the idea of players using the tennis court to showcase fashion instead of just competing. Off the court, Lenglen frequently wore an oversized and expensive fur coat.

=== Honours ===
Lenglen is honoured in a variety of ways at the French Open. At Stade Roland Garros, Court Suzanne Lenglen – the second show court that was built in 1994 with a capacity of about ten thousand – was named after her in 1997. Outside the court, there is a bronze relief statue of Lenglen that was erected in 1994. The FFLT had originally planned to erect a statue of Lenglen immediately after her death, but this plan never materialised due to the start of World War II later that year. Additionally, one of the main entrances to the ground is Porte Suzanne Lenglen, which leads to Allée Suzanne Lenglen. Moreover, the women's singles championship trophy was named the Coupe Suzanne Lenglen in 1987. In spite of her success at the French Championships, Lenglen never competed at Stade Roland Garros as it did not become the site for the tournament until 1928, after her retirement from amateur tennis.

Lenglen was inducted into the International Tennis Hall of Fame in 1978. Following her death, she was awarded the Cross of the Legion of Honour. Another road, the Avenue Suzanne Lenglen, is named in her honour outside of the Nice Lawn Tennis Club. She has been honoured in a Google Doodle twice, once on her 117th birthday on 24 May 2016, and again on International Women's Day on 8 March 2017.

== Personal life ==
Lenglen was in a long-term relationship with Baldwin Baldwin from 1927 to 1932. Baldwin was the grandson and heir to Lucky Baldwin, a prominent businessman and real estate investor active in California. Lenglen met Baldwin during her professional tour in the United States. Although they intended to get married, those plans never materialised largely because Baldwin was already married and his wife would not agree to a divorce while Lenglen and Baldwin were together. During this time, her father died of poor health in 1929.

Lenglen was the author of several books on tennis, the first two of which she wrote during her amateur career. Her first book, Lawn Tennis for Girls, covered techniques and advice on tactics for beginner tennis players. She also wrote Lawn Tennis: The Game of Nations and a romantic novel, The Love Game: Being the Life Story of Marcelle Penrose. Lenglen finished her last book Tennis by Simple Exercises with Margaret Morris in 1937. The book featured a section by Lenglen on what was needed to become an all-around tennis player and a section by Morris, a choreographer and dancer, on exercises designed for tennis players. She played a role as an actress in the 1935 British musical comedy film Things Are Looking Up, in which she contests a tennis match against the lead character portrayed by Cicely Courtneidge.

In 1933, Lenglen returned to tennis as a coach serving as the director of a school on the grounds of Stade Roland Garros. She opened her own tennis school for girls in 1936 at the Tennis Mirabeau in Paris with the support of the FFLT. She began instructing adults the following year. In May 1938, Lenglen became the inaugural director of the French National Tennis School in Paris.

Shortly after her appointment, Lenglen became severely fatigued while teaching at the school and needed to receive a blood transfusion. She had other health issues post-retirement, most notably suffering from appendicitis and undergoing an appendectomy in October 1934. Lenglen died on 4 July 1938 at the age of 39, three weeks after she became ill, and was reported to have died from pernicious anemia. Her specific cause of death was unclear owing to anemia being curable, and to reports of her having other illnesses, including leukemia. Lenglen was buried at the Cimetière de Saint-Ouen just outside Paris.

== Career statistics ==
=== Performance timelines ===
Key
W	F	SF	QF	#R	RR	Q#	DNQ	A	NH

(W) winner; (F) finalist; (SF) semifinalist; (QF) quarterfinalist; (#R) rounds 4, 3, 2, 1; (RR) round-robin stage; (Q#) qualification round; (DNQ) did not qualify; (A) absent; (NH) not held; (SR) strike rate (events won / competed); (W–L) win–loss record.

Results from the French Championships before 1924 do not count towards the statistical totals because the tournament was not yet open to international players.

==== Singles ====
Tournament	1914	1915–18	1919	1920	1921	1922	1923	1924	1925	1926	SR	W–L	Win %
Grand Slam tournaments (Note: The four modern Grand Slam tournaments were established in 1924. The French Championships are the only such tournament where earlier results are not counted towards Grand Slam statistics because it had not been open to international players. Lenglen never competed at the Australasian Championships, which began for women in 1922.)
French Championships	F	Not Held		W	W	W	W	A	W	W	2 / 2	10–0	100%
Wimbledon	A	NH	W	W	W	W	W	SF	W	3R	6 / 8	32–0	100%
U.S. Championships	A	A	A	A	2R	A	A	A	A	A	0 / 1	0–1	0%
World Championship tournaments (Note: From 1912 to 1923, there were three World Championship tournaments on different surfaces: Grass Court (Wimbledon), Hard Court (clay), and Covered Court (wood). In 1924, Wimbledon became one of the new Grand Slam tournaments, the World Hard Court Championships were replaced by the French Championships, and the World Covered Court Championships (at which Lenglen never competed) were abolished.)
World Hard Court Championships	W	Not Held		1R	W	W	W	Defunct			4 / 5	17–0	100%

==== Doubles ====
Tournament	1914	1915–18	1919	1920	1921	1922	1923	1924	1925	1926	SR	W–L	Win %
Grand Slam tournaments
French Championships	F	Not Held		W	W	W	W	A	W	W	2 / 2	7–0	100%
Wimbledon	A	NH	W	W	W	W	W	QF	W	2R	6 / 8	29–1	97%
U.S. Championships	A	A	A	A	1R	A	A	A	A	A	0 / 1	0–0	–
World Championship tournaments
World Hard Court Championships	W	Not Held		A	W	W	F	Defunct			3 / 4	13–1	93%

==== Mixed doubles ====
Tournament	1914	1915–18	1919	1920	1921	1922	1923	1924	1925	1926	SR	W–L	Win %
Grand Slam tournaments
French Championships	W	Not Held		W	W	W	W	A	W	W	2 / 2	8–0	100%
Wimbledon	A	NH	QF	W	2R	W	SF	QF	W	2R	3 / 8	30–2	94%
World Championship tournaments
World Hard Court Championships	F	Not Held		A	W	W	W	Defunct			3 / 4	16–1	94%

=== Major finals ===
==== Grand Slam singles: 8 (8 titles) ====
Result	Year	Tournament	Surface	Opponent	Score
Win	1919	Wimbledon	Grass	(United Kingdom) Dorothea Lambert Chambers	10–8, 4–6, 9–7
Win	1920	Wimbledon (2)	Grass	(United Kingdom) Dorothea Lambert Chambers	6–3, 6–0
Win	1921	Wimbledon (3)	Grass	(United States) Elizabeth Ryan	6–2, 6–0
Win	1922	Wimbledon (4)	Grass	(United States) Molla Mallory	6–2, 6–0
Win	1923	Wimbledon (5)	Grass	(United Kingdom) Kathleen McKane	6–2, 6–2
Win	1925	French Championships	Clay	(United Kingdom) Kathleen McKane	6–1, 6–2
Win	1925	Wimbledon (6)	Grass	(United Kingdom) Joan Fry	6–2, 6–0
Win	1926	French Championships (2)	Clay	(United States) Mary Browne	6–1, 6–0

==== World Championship singles: 4 (4 titles) ====
Result	Year	Tournament	Surface	Opponent	Score
Win	1914	World Hard Court Championships	Clay	(France) Germaine Golding	6–3, 6–2
Win	1921	World Hard Court Championships (2)	Clay	(United States) Molla Mallory	6–2, 6–3
Win	1922	World Hard Court Championships (3)	Clay	(United States) Elizabeth Ryan	6–3, 6–2
Win	1923	World Hard Court Championships (4)	Clay	(United Kingdom) Kathleen McKane	6–2, 6–3

=== Olympic medal matches ===
==== Singles: 1 (1 gold medal) ====
Result	Year	Tournament	Surface	Opponent	Score
Gold	1920	Antwerp Olympics	Grass	(United Kingdom) Dorothy Holman	6–3, 6–0

== See also ==
- List of Grand Slam women's singles champions
- List of Grand Slam women's doubles champions
- List of Grand Slam mixed doubles champions
- List of Grand Slam-related tennis records
