= Tennis at the 1920 Summer Olympics – Mixed doubles =

Mixed doubles tennis at the Games of the VII Olympiad
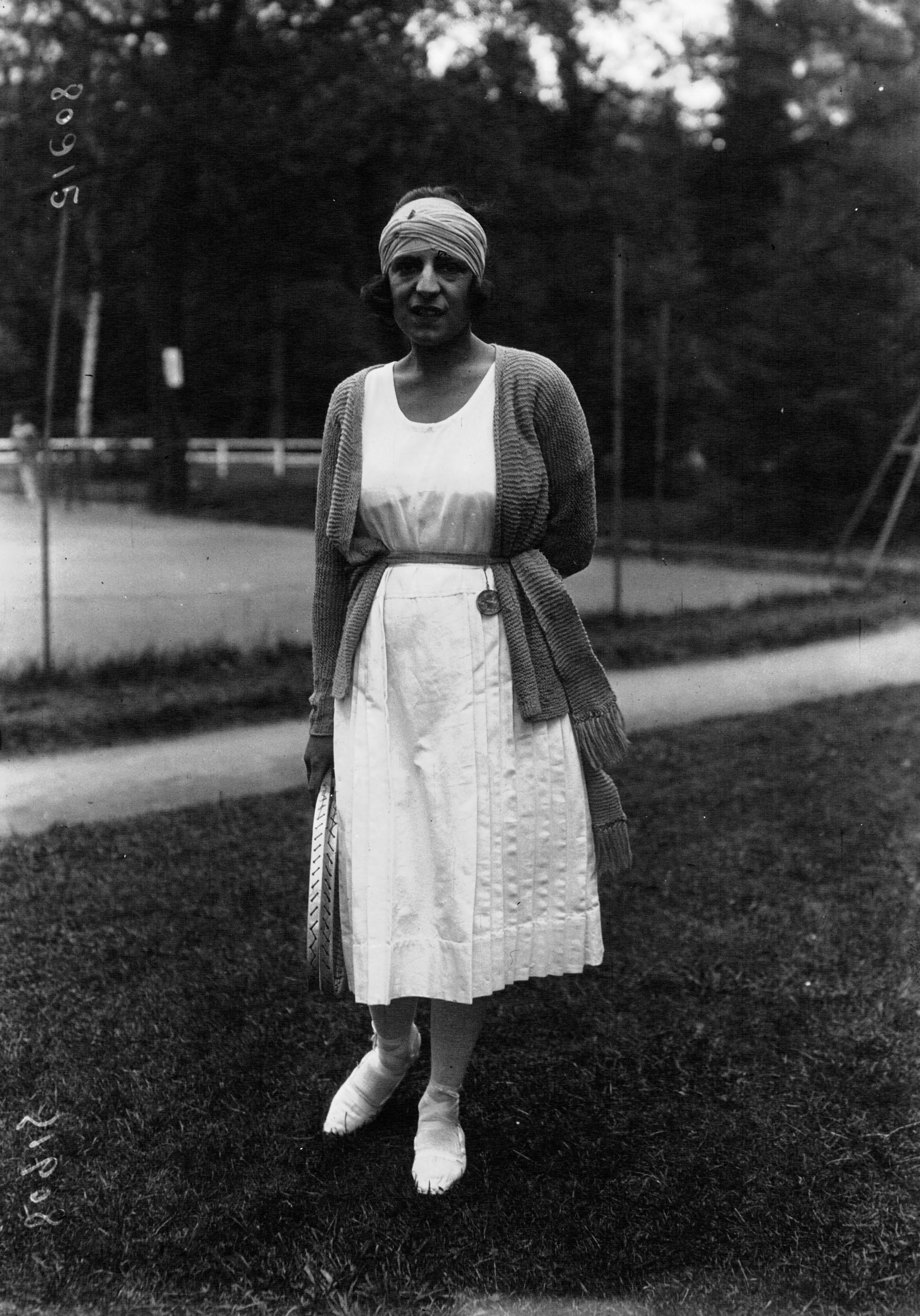
- Gold medalist Suzanne Lenglen
- Venue: Beerschot Tennis Club
- Dates: 17–24 August 1920
- Competitors: 32 from 7 nations
- Teams: 16

Medalists
1st place, gold medalist(s)		France: Suzanne Lenglen; Max Decugis
2nd place, silver medalist(s)		Great Britain: Kathleen McKane Godfree; Max Woosnam
3rd place, bronze medalist(s)		Czechoslovakia: Milada Skrbková; Ladislav Žemla

Mixed doubles
- Tennis at the 1920 Summer Olympics

Events
Singles	men	women
Doubles	men	women	mixed
← 1912 ·	Summer Olympics	· 1924 →

The mixed doubles was a tennis event held as part of the Tennis at the 1920 Summer Olympics programme. It was the third appearance of the event. A total of 32 players (16 pairs) from 7 nations competed in the event, which was held from 17 to 24 August 1920 at the Beerschot Tennis Club. French pair Suzanne Lenglen and Max Decugis took gold, with British players Kathleen McKane Godfree and Max Woosnam earning silver and Czechoslovakia's Milada Skrbková and Ladislav Žemla winning bronze. It was the first victory for France in the event; Czechoslovakia earned its first mixed doubles medal in its event debut.

== Background ==
This was the third appearance of mixed doubles tennis. The event was first held in 1900 and would not be held again until 1912 (when both outdoor and indoor versions were held); it would then be held the next two Games in 1920 and 1924. Tennis was not a medal sport from 1928 to 1984, though there were demonstration events in 1968 (which included mixed doubles) and 1984 (which did not). Mixed doubles did not return with the rest of the tennis programme in 1988; instead, it was not until 2012 that mixed doubles returned to the programme, where it has been since.

Suzanne Lenglen and Max Decugis had won the last French Championship before World War I (in 1914) and the first French Championship after the war (in 1920). Decugis had won multiple mixed doubles titles with other partners previously.

Belgium, Czechoslovakia, Denmark, and Italy each made their mixed doubles debut. France competed for the third time, the only nation to have competed at each previous edition.

== Competition format ==
The competition was a single-elimination tournament with a bronze-medal match. All matches were best-of-three sets.

== Schedule ==
Date	Time	Round
Tuesday, 17 August 1920		Round of 32; Round of 16
Wednesday, 18 August 1920		Round of 32; Round of 16
Thursday, 19 August 1920		Round of 16
Friday, 20 August 1920		Round of 16
Saturday, 21 August 1920; Sunday, 22 August 1920; Monday, 23 August 1920		Quarterfinals; Semifinals; Bronze medal match
Tuesday, 24 August 1920		Final

== Draw ==
=== Key ===
- Q = Qualifier
- WC = Wild card
- LL = Lucky loser
- Alt = Alternate
- SE = Special exempt
- PR = Protected ranking
- ITF = ITF entry
- JE = Junior exempt
- w/o = Walkover
- r = Retired
- d = Defaulted
- SR = Special ranking

=== Finals ===
Semifinals
Amory Hansen (DEN); Erik Tegner (DEN)	0	1
Suzanne Lenglen (FRA); Max Decugis (FRA)	6	6
Kathleen McKane (GBR); Max Woosnam (GBR)	9	6
Milada Skrbková (TCH); Ladislav Žemla (TCH)	7	3

Final (gold-medal match)
Suzanne Lenglen (FRA); Max Decugis (FRA)	6	6
Kathleen McKane (GBR); Max Woosnam (GBR)	4	2
Bronze-medal match
Amory Hansen (DEN); Erik Tegner (DEN)	6	4
Milada Skrbková (TCH); Ladislav Žemla (TCH)	8	6

=== Top half ===
First round
M Chaudoir (BEL); A Lammens (BEL)
F Subirana (ESP); M Alonso Areyzaga (ESP)	w/o
S Lenglen (FRA); M Decugis (FRA)
M Rospide (ESP); JM Alonso Areyzaga (ESP)	w/o
G Beamish (GBR); A Beamish (GBR)	4	6	7
W McNair (GBR); N Turnbull (GBR)	6	4	5

Second round
A Hansen (DEN); E Tegner (DEN)	4	8	6
A de Borman (BEL); J Washer (BEL)	6	6	3
L Strömberg-von Essen (SWE); S Malmström (SWE)
M Lindberg (SWE); O Andersson (SWE)	w/o
J Vaussard (FRA); F Blanchy (FRA)	6	5	3
M Chaudoir (BEL); A Lammens (BEL)	4	7	6
S Lenglen (FRA); M Decugis (FRA)	6	6
G Beamish (GBR); A Beamish (GBR)	2	0

Quarterfinals
A Hansen (DEN); E Tegner (DEN)	0	6	6
L Strömberg-von Essen (SWE); S Malmström (SWE)	6	1	2
M Chaudoir (BEL); A Lammens (BEL)	6	1	1
S Lenglen (FRA); M Decugis (FRA)	3	6	6

Semifinals
A Hansen (DEN); E Tegner (DEN)	0	1
S Lenglen (FRA); M Decugis (FRA)	6	6

=== Bottom half ===
First round
É d'Ayen (FRA); P Hirsch (FRA)	7	8
S Fick (SWE); A Lindqvist (SWE)	5	6
K McKane (GBR); M Woosnam (GBR)	6	6
D Holman (GBR); G Lowe (GBR)	4	2

Second round
É d'Ayen (FRA); P Hirsch (FRA)	4	2
K McKane (GBR); M Woosnam (GBR)	6	6
G Ferelli (ITA); M Balbi di Robecco (ITA)	w/o
C Dahl (NOR); C Langaard (NOR)
M Dupont (BEL); R Laloux (BEL)	5	4
M Skrbková (TCH); L Žemla (TCH)	7	6
R Gagliardi (ITA); C Colombo (ITA)	6	3
M Storms (BEL); S Halot (BEL)	8	6

Quarterfinals
K McKane (GBR); M Woosnam (GBR)
C Dahl (NOR); C Langaard (NOR)	w/o
M Skrbková (TCH); L Žemla (TCH)	7	6
M Storms (BEL); S Halot (BEL)	5	3

Semifinals
K McKane (GBR); M Woosnam (GBR)	9	6
M Skrbková (TCH); L Žemla (TCH)	7	3

== Sources ==
- Belgium Olympic Committee (1957). Olympic Games Antwerp 1920: Official Report (in French).
- Wudarski, Pawel (1999). "Wyniki Igrzysk Olimpijskich" (in Polish).
- ITF, 2008 Olympic Tennis Event Media Guide
