= Tennis at the 1920 Summer Olympics – Women's singles =

Women's singles tennis at the Games of the VII Olympiad
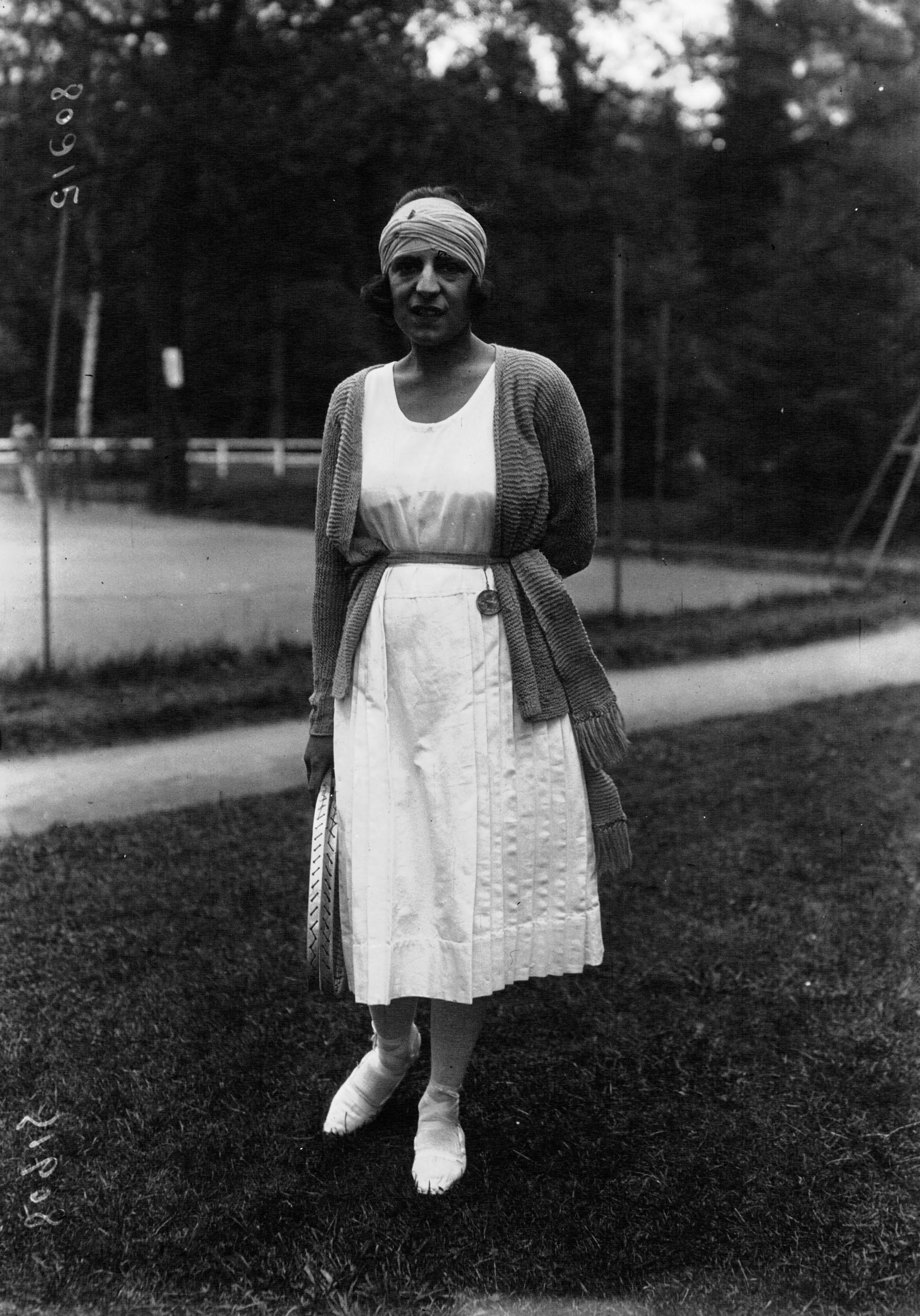
- Gold medalist Suzanne Lenglen
- Venue: Beerschot Tennis Club
- Dates: 16–24 August 1920
- Competitors: 18 from 7 nations

Medalists
1st place, gold medalist(s)		Suzanne Lenglen	France
2nd place, silver medalist(s)		Dorothy Holman	Great Britain
3rd place, bronze medalist(s)		Kathleen McKane Godfree	Great Britain

Women's singles
- Tennis at the 1920 Summer Olympics

Events
Singles	men	women
Doubles	men	women	mixed
← 1912 ·	Summer Olympics	· 1924 →

The women's singles was a tennis event held as part of the Tennis at the 1920 Summer Olympics programme. A total of 18 players from 7 nations competed in the event, which was held from 16 to 24 August 1920 at the Beerschot Tennis Club. The event was won by Suzanne Lenglen of France, defeating Dorothy Holman of Great Britain in the final. It was the second consecutive victory for a French woman, with Marguerite Broquedis winning the pre-war 1912 tournament. Kathleen McKane Godfree of Great Britain defeated Sigrid Fick of Sweden in the bronze-medal match.

Lenglen's victory was comprehensive, as she lost only 4 games in her 5 matches (1 to Fick in the semifinals, 3 to Holman in the final).

== Background ==
This was the fourth appearance of the women's singles tennis. A women's event was held only once during the first three Games (only men's tennis was played in 1896 and 1904), but has been held at every Olympics for which there was a tennis tournament since 1908. Tennis was not a medal sport from 1928 to 1984, though there were demonstration events in 1968 and 1984.

France's Suzanne Lenglen was the "dominant women's player in the world, and considered by some as the greatest female player of all time." She highlighted a strong field, including top British players Dorothy Holman and Kathleen McKane Godfree. Absent were Molla Mallory (a bronze medalist for Norway in 1912 who had emigrated to the United States; in 1921, she would be the only woman to beat Lenglen post-war), Dorothea Douglass Lambert Chambers of Great Britain (the 1908 Olympic gold medalist and seven-time Wimbledon winner, who had reached the Wimbledon finals in 1919 and 1920, losing both to Lenglen), and Elizabeth Ryan of the United States (long-time doubles partner of Lenglen, who would reach the 1921 Wimbledon singles final against her).

Belgium, Denmark, and Italy each made their debut in the event. France and Great Britain each made their third appearance, tied for most among nations to that point.

== Competition format ==
The competition was a single-elimination tournament with a bronze-medal match. All matches were best-of-three sets.

== Schedule ==
Date	Time	Round
Monday, 16 August 1920		Round of 32
Tuesday, 17 August 1920; Wednesday, 18 August 1920		Round of 16
Thursday, 19 August 1920; Friday, 20 August 1920; Saturday, 21 August 1920; Sunday, 22 August 1920; Monday, 23 August 1920		Quarterfinals; Semifinals
Tuesday, 24 August 1920		Bronze medal match Final

== Draw ==
=== Key ===
- Q = Qualifier
- WC = Wild card
- LL = Lucky loser
- Alt = Alternate
- SE = Special exempt
- PR = Protected ranking
- ITF = ITF entry
- JE = Junior exempt
- w/o = Walkover
- r = Retired
- d = Defaulted
- SR = Special ranking

=== Finals ===
Semifinals
Sigrid Fick (SWE)	0	1
Suzanne Lenglen (FRA)	6	6
Kathleen McKane (GBR)	w/o
Dorothy Holman (GBR)

Final (gold-medal match)
Suzanne Lenglen (FRA)	6	6
Dorothy Holman (GBR)	3	0
Bronze-medal match
Sigrid Fick (SWE)	2	0
Kathleen McKane (GBR)	6	6

=== Top half ===
First round
E Brehm (DEN)	6	6
M Dupont (BEL)	3	4
W McNair (GBR)
F Subirana (ESP)	w/o
S Lenglen (FRA)	6	6
M Storms (BEL)	0	0

Second round
A de Borman (BEL)
M Skrbková (TCH)	w/o
S Fick (SWE)	7	6
C Dahl (NOR)	5	2
L Strömberg-von Essen (SWE)	7	6
E Brehm (DEN)	5	3
W McNair (GBR)	0	0
S Lenglen (FRA)	6	6

Quarterfinals
A de Borman (BEL)	4	6
S Fick (SWE)	6	8
L Strömberg-von Essen (SWE)	0	0
S Lenglen (FRA)	6	6

Semifinals
S Fick (SWE)	0	1
S Lenglen (FRA)	6	6

=== Bottom half ===
First round
R Gagliardi (ITA)	6	0
M Lindberg (SWE)	0	0^{r}
K McKane (GBR)	6	6
J Vaussard (FRA)	4	4

Second round
R Gagliardi (ITA)	1	6	2
K McKane (GBR)	6	1	6
A Hansen (DEN)	2	3
É d'Ayen (FRA)	6	6
G Ferelli (ITA)	w/o
F Arendt (BEL)
G Beamish (GBR)	6	2
D Holman (GBR)	8	6

Quarterfinals
K McKane (GBR)	6	6
É d'Ayen (FRA)	2	3
F Arendt (BEL)	2	3
D Holman (GBR)	6	6

Semifinals
K McKane (GBR)	w/o
D Holman (GBR)

== Sources ==
- Belgium Olympic Committee (1957). Olympic Games Antwerp 1920: Official Report (in French).
- Wudarski, Pawel (1999). "Wyniki Igrzysk Olimpijskich" (in Polish).
- ITF, 2008 Olympic Tennis Event Media Guide
