= Amory Hansen =

Danish tennis player

- Country (sports): Denmark
- Born: 24 February 1887; Copenhagen, Denmark
- Died: 6 October 1961 (aged 74); Copenhagen, Denmark

Doubles
- Olympic Games: 4th (1920)

Amory Ide Agnes Hansen (née Scheel) (24 February 1887 – 6 October 1961) was a Danish tennis player who competed in the 1920 Summer Olympics. She was born and died in Copenhagen.

In 1920 she and her partner Erik Tegner finished fourth in the mixed doubles event after losing the bronze medal match to Milada Skrbková and Ladislav Žemla.

In the women's doubles tournament she and her partner Elsebeth Brehm were eliminated in the quarter-finals after losing their match to Marie Storms and Fernande Arendt. Hansen also participated in the singles competition but was eliminated in the second round after losing her match to Élisabeth d'Ayen.
