= 1923 World Hard Court Championships – Men's singles =

Men's singles
- 1923 World Hard Court Championships

Final
- Champion: (United States) Bill Johnston
- Runner-up: (Belgium) Jean Washer
- Score: 4–6, 6–2, 6–2, 4–6, 6–3

Details
- Draw: 70

Events
Singles	men	women
Doubles	men	women	mixed
- World Hard Court Championships

The men's singles was one of five events of the 1923 World Hard Court Championships tennis tournament held in Paris, France from 19 until 27 May 1923. The draw consisted of 70 players. Henri Cochet was the defending champion, but was knocked out in the semifinals. American Bill Johnston won the title after defeating Belgian Jean Washer in the final in five sets.

== Draw ==
Key

- Q = Qualifier
- WC = Wild card
- LL = Lucky loser
- Alt = Alternate
- ITF = ITF entry
- PR = Protected ranking
- SR = Special ranking
- SE = Special exempt
- JE = Junior exempt
- JR = Junior Accelerator Programme entrant
- CO = College Accelerator Programme entrant
- NG = Next Gen Accelerator Program entrant
- w/o = Walkover
- r = Retired
- d = Defaulted

=== Finals ===
Quarterfinals
(Netherlands) Christiaan van Lennep	6	0	1	8
(France) Henri Cochet	4	6	6	10
(Denmark) Erik Tegner	3	1	0
(Belgium) Jean Washer	6	6	6
(United States) Bill Johnston	6	6	6
(France) Roger Danet	3	2	1
(France) René Lacoste	6	6	6
(Netherlands) Maas van der Feen	1	3	1

Semifinals
(France) Henri Cochet	1	6	6	4	3
(Belgium) Jean Washer	6	3	3	6	6
(United States) Bill Johnston	6	8	6	6
(France) René Lacoste	4	10	4	3

Final
(Belgium) Jean Washer	6	2	2	6	3
(United States) Bill Johnston	4	6	6	4	6

=== Top half ===
==== Section 1 ====
First round

Second round
(United Kingdom) John Gilbert	6	6	6
(France) André Roche	3	2	1
(Italy) G.L.A. Brian	4	3	1
(France) Jacques Brugnon	6	6	6
(Netherlands) Christiaan van Lennep	6	6	6
(France) Alain Bernard	2	3	0
?	?	?	?
(Belgium) Maurice v.d. Bemden	?	?	?

Third round
(United Kingdom) John Gilbert	6	6	6
(France) Jacques Brugnon	2	4	2
(Netherlands) Christiaan van Lennep	6	6	6
(Belgium) Maurice v.d. Bemden	1	0	0

Fourth round
(United Kingdom) John Gilbert	6	3	4	6
(Netherlands) Christiaan van Lennep	4	6	6	8

==== Section 2 ====
First round

Second round
(Czechoslovakia) Rázný Zemla	w/o
(India) Ali-Hassan Fyzee
(Italy) Placido Gaslini	2	2	1
(United Kingdom) Brame Hillyard	6	6	6
(France) Henri Cochet	w/o
(Czechoslovakia) Friedrich Röhrer
(France) Jacques Samazeuilh
(Italy) Cesare Colombo	w/o

Third round
(Czechoslovakia) Rázný Zemla	3	7	5
(United Kingdom) Brame Hillyard	6	9	7
(France) Henri Cochet	1	6	9	6
(Italy) Cesare Colombo	6	2	7	3

Fourth round
(United Kingdom) Brame Hillyard	2	8	4
(France) Henri Cochet	6	10	6

==== Section 3 ====
First round

Second round
(Switzerland) Pablo Debran	w/o
(United Kingdom) Donald Greig
(Denmark) Erik Tegner	6	6	6
(Italy) C. Strazza	4	1	4
(France) Pierre Hirsch	4	6	6	6
(France) André Casanova	6	4	3	3
?	?	?	?
(Spain) Eduardo Flaquer	?	?	?

Third round
(Switzerland) Pablo Debran	6	3	6	8
(Denmark) Erik Tegner	4	6	8	10
(France) Pierre Hirsch	6	2	1	0
(Spain) Eduardo Flaquer	2	6	6	6

Fourth round
(Denmark) Erik Tegner	1	6	6	6
(Spain) Eduardo Flaquer	6	4	3	2

==== Section 4 ====
First round
(Belgium) Jean Washer	8	4	6	6
(France) R. Georges	6	6	3	3
(France) R. Barbas	6	6	6
(Italy) Mario Brian	2	1	0
(France) Max Decugis	w/o
(Romania) Nicolae Mişu

Second round
(France) André Gobert	8	4	6	6
(Switzerland) J. d'Espine	6	6	3	3
(United Kingdom) F. R. Leighton Crawford	4	4	9	0
(Italy) Umberto de Morpurgo	6	6	7	6
(South Africa) Brian Norton
(Belgium) Jean Washer	w/o
(France) R. Barbas	4	5	6	2
(France) Max Decugis	6	7	3	6

Third round
(France) André Gobert	7	6	11	1	6
(Italy) Umberto de Morpurgo	9	3	9	6	3
(Belgium) Jean Washer	6	6	6
(France) Max Decugis	1	2	2

Fourth round
(France) André Gobert	7	4	4	8
(Belgium) Jean Washer	5	6	6	10

=== Bottom half ===
==== Section 5 ====
First round
(United States) Bill Johnston	6	4	7	6
(United States) Coco Gentien	4	6	5	4
(Italy) Clemente Serventi	6	6	6
(France) Robert Champin	3	2	3
(Netherlands) Arthur Diemer Kool	8	6	6
(France) Adrien Aron	6	1	3

Second round
(United States) Bill Johnston	6	8	6
(Italy) Clemente Serventi	0	6	2
(Netherlands) Arthur Diemer Kool	w/o
(France) Jean Francois Blanchy
(France) Léonce Aslangul	6	6	6
(United States) K.W. Webb	0	0	0
(France) Paul Féret	3	6	6	0	6
(Italy) Giovanni Balbi	6	0	3	6	3

Third round
(United States) Bill Johnston	6	6	4	6
(Netherlands) Arthur Diemer Kool	3	2	6	4
(France) Léonce Aslangul	6	0	6	6
(France) Paul Féret	2	6	1	0

Fourth round
(United States) Bill Johnston	6	4	6	6
(France) Léonce Aslangul	4	6	2	2

==== Section 6 ====
First round

Second round
(Czechoslovakia) Sláva Ardelt-Robětín	w/o
(Australia) Stanley Doust
(France) Roger Danet	6	11	6
(United States) Clifton Herd	3	9	2
(United States) Henry Moore	1	1	2
(Spain) Manuel de Gomar	6	6	6
(France) Torriep	5	3	4
(Denmark) Erik Worm	7	6	6

Third round
(Czechoslovakia) Sláva Ardelt-Robětín	4	1	2
(France) Roger Danet	6	6	6
(Spain) Manuel de Gomar	6	6	6
(Denmark) Erik Worm	4	3	1

Fourth round
(France) Roger Danet	6	6	6	6
(Spain) Manuel de Gomar	3	8	0	3

==== Section 7 ====
First round

Second round
(France) René Lacoste	6	6	6
(Portugal) Jose de Verda	3	3	3
(Switzerland) Charles Aeschlimann	w/o
(France) F. Borotra
(United Kingdom) John Wheatley	6	4	6	6
(France) Jean le Besnerais	3	6	3	1
(India) Athar-Ali Fyzee
(France) Pierre Canivet	w/o

Third round
(France) René Lacoste	6	7	2	6
(Switzerland) Charles Aeschlimann	1	5	6	2
(United Kingdom) John Wheatley	6	6	4	6
(France) Pierre Canivet	3	2	6	1

Fourth round
(France) René Lacoste	6	7	6
(United Kingdom) John Wheatley	4	5	4

==== Section 8 ====
First round

Second round
(France) Jean Borotra
(Czechoslovakia) Frantisek Soyka	w/o
(Netherlands) Maas van der Feen	6	4	3	6	6
(France) Edouard Thurneyssen	3	6	6	1	4
(Belgium) Georges Watson	6	3	6	6	6
(Sweden) Sune Malmström	4	6	2	8	1
(Denmark) Henning Larsen	3	2	6	0
(France) George Manset	6	6	3	0^{r}

Third round
(Czechoslovakia) Frantisek Soyka
(Netherlands) Maas van der Feen	w/o
(Belgium) Georges Watson
(Denmark) Henning Larsen	w/o

Fourth round
(Netherlands) Maas van der Feen	6	6	6
(Denmark) Henning Larsen	2	2	2
