= Tennis at the 1920 Summer Olympics – Women's doubles =

Women's doubles tennis at the Games of the VII Olympiad
- Venue: Beerschot Tennis Club
- Dates: 17–24 August
- Competitors: 8 teams from 5 nations

Medalists
1st place, gold medalist(s)		Kathleen McKane; Winifred McNair	Great Britain
2nd place, silver medalist(s)		Winifred Beamish; Dorothy Holman	Great Britain
3rd place, bronze medalist(s)		Élisabeth d'Ayen; Suzanne Lenglen	France

Women's doubles
- Tennis at the 1920 Summer Olympics

Events
Singles	men	women
Doubles	men	women	mixed
← 1912 ·	Summer Olympics	· 1924 →

The women's doubles was a tennis event held as part of the Tennis at the 1920 Summer Olympics programme. It was the first appearance of the event. A total of 18 players, comprising 9 pairs, from 5 nations competed in the event, which was held from 17 to 24 August 1920 at the Beerschot Tennis Club.

== Draw ==
=== Key ===
- Q = Qualifier
- WC = Wild card
- LL = Lucky loser
- Alt = Alternate
- SE = Special exempt
- PR = Protected ranking
- ITF = ITF entry
- JE = Junior exempt
- w/o = Walkover
- r = Retired
- d = Defaulted
- SR = Special ranking

=== Draw ===
First round
Marguerite Chaudoir (BEL); Marthe Dupont (BEL)	6	2	6
Marie Jones (BEL); Suzanne Laurencin (BEL)	3	6	2

Quarterfinals
Suzanne Lenglen (FRA); Élisabeth d'Ayen (FRA)	6	6
Sigrid Fick (SWE); Lily Strömberg-von Essen (SWE)	4	3
Kathleen McKane (GBR); Winifred McNair (GBR)	6	7
Marguerite Chaudoir (BEL); Marthe Dupont (BEL)	2	5
Anne de Borman (BEL); Lucienne Tschaggeny (BEL)	2	4
Winifred Beamish (GBR); Dorothy Holman (GBR)	6	6
Amory Hansen (DEN); Elsebeth Brehm (DEN)	1	1
Fernande Arendt (BEL); Marie Storms (BEL)	6	6

Semifinals
Suzanne Lenglen (FRA); Élisabeth d'Ayen (FRA)	6	3	6
Kathleen McKane (GBR); Winifred McNair (GBR)	2	6	8
Winifred Beamish (GBR); Dorothy Holman (GBR)	6	6
Fernande Arendt (BEL); Marie Storms (BEL)	1	1

Final (gold-medal match)
Kathleen McKane (GBR); Winifred McNair (GBR)	8	6
Winifred Beamish (GBR); Dorothy Holman (GBR)	6	4
Bronze-medal match
Suzanne Lenglen (FRA); Élisabeth d'Ayen (FRA)
Fernande Arendt (BEL); Marie Storms (BEL)	w/o

== Sources ==
- Belgium Olympic Committee (1957). Olympic Games Antwerp 1920: Official Report (in French).
- Wudarski, Pawel (1999). "Wyniki Igrzysk Olimpijskich" (in Polish).
- ITF, 2008 Olympic Tennis Event Media Guide
