= 1914 World Hard Court Championships =

3rd edition of the World Hard Court Championship

- Date: 29 May–8 June
- Edition: 3rd
- Category: World Championship
- Surface: Clay / outdoor
- Location: Saint-Cloud, Paris, France
- Venue: Stade Français

Champions

Men's singles
- (New Zealand) Anthony Wilding

Women's singles
- (France) Suzanne Lenglen

Men's doubles
- (France) Max Decugis (France) Maurice Germot

Women's doubles
- (France) Suzanne Lenglen (United States) Elizabeth Ryan

Mixed doubles
- (France) Max Decugis (United States) Elizabeth Ryan
- World Hard Court Championships

The 1914 World Hard Court Championships (WHCC) (French: Championnats du Monde de Tennis sur Terre Battue) was the third edition of the World Hard Court Championships tennis tournament, considered as the precursor to the French Open, and was held on the clay courts of the Stade Français at the Parc de Saint-Cloud in Paris from 29 May until 8 June 1914. It was organised by L’Union des Sociétés Française de Sports Athlétiques, and consisted of five events: men's singles, men's doubles, women's singles, women's doubles and mixed doubles event, with the women's doubles event part of the competition for the first time.

== Finals ==
=== Men's singles ===
(New Zealand) Anthony Wilding defeated (Austria) Ludwig von Salm-Hoogstraeten, 6–0, 6–2, 6–4

=== Women's singles ===
(France) Suzanne Lenglen defeated (France) Germaine Golding, 6–2, 6–1

=== Men's doubles ===
(France) Max Decugis / (France) Maurice Germot defeated (United Kingdom) Arthur Gore / (United Kingdom) Algernon Kingscote, 6–1, 11–9, 6–8, 6–2

=== Women's doubles ===
(France) Suzanne Lenglen / (United States) Elizabeth Ryan defeated (France) Blanche Amblard / (France) Suzanne Amblard, 6–1, 6–1

=== Mixed doubles ===
(France) Max Decugis / (United States) Elizabeth Ryan defeated (Austria) Ludwig von Salm-Hoogstraeten / (France) Suzanne Lenglen, 6–3, 6–1
