= 1923 World Hard Court Championships – Women's singles =

Women's singles
- 1923 World Hard Court Championships

Final
- Champion: (France) Suzanne Lenglen
- Runner-up: (United Kingdom) Kitty McKane
- Score: 6–3, 6–3

Details
- Draw: 38

Events
Singles	men	women
Doubles	men	women	mixed
← 1922 ·	World Hard Court Championships

The women's singles was one of five events of the 1923 World Hard Court Championships tennis tournament held in Paris, France from 19 until 27 May 1923. The draw consisted of 38 players. Suzanne Lenglen, the two-time defending champion, defeated Kitty McKane 6–3, 6–3 in the final to win her fourth championship title.

== Draw ==
=== Finals ===
Quarterfinals
(France) Suzanne Lenglen	6	6
(France) Marie Conquet	1	1
(United States) Eleanor Goss	6	2	1
(United Kingdom) Geraldine Beamish	4	6	6
(France) Germaine Golding	2	7	6
(France) Diddie Vlasto	6	5	2
(France) Marguerite Billout	2	5
(United Kingdom) Kitty McKane	6	7

Semifinals
(France) Suzanne Lenglen	6	6
(United Kingdom) Geraldine Beamish	1	1
(France) Germaine Golding	2	2
(United Kingdom) Kitty McKane	6	6

Finals
(France) Suzanne Lenglen	6	6
(United Kingdom) Kitty McKane	3	3

=== Top half ===
==== Section 1 ====
First round

Second round
(France) Suzanne Lenglen	w/o
(Austria) Erna Redlich
(Italy) Giulia Perelli	w/o
(France) N. Descleres
(France) Daisy Speranza-Wyns	6	6
(United States) Miss Ginn	0	4
(France) Marie Conquet	8	6
(United States) Eleanora Sears	6	2

Third round
(France) Suzanne Lenglen	6	6
(Italy) Giulia Perelli	0	0
(France) Daisy Speranza-Wyns	2	6
(France) Marie Conquet	6	8

Quarterfinals
(France) Suzanne Lenglen	6	6
(France) Marie Conquet	1	1

==== Section 2 ====
First round
(Netherlands) Kea Bouman	6	6
(France) Mme Delagentiere	1	0
(United Kingdom) Miss Lammin	w/o
(France) Germaine Pigueron
(Spain) Lili de Alvarez	6	6
(France) Mlle Chanclaire	4	4

Second round
(United States) Eleanor Goss	7	4	9
(France) Charmaine Charnelet	5	6	7
(France) Suzanne Devé	6	6
(Belgium) Anne de Borman	1	3
(Netherlands) Kea Bouman	6	6
(United Kingdom) Miss Lammin	1	3
(Spain) Lili de Alvarez	2	6	4
(United Kingdom) Geraldine Beamish	6	2	6

Third round
(United States) Eleanor Goss	6	6
(France) Suzanne Devé	2	4
(Netherlands) Kea Bouman	0	0
(United Kingdom) Geraldine Beamish	6	6

Quarterfinals
(United States) Eleanor Goss	6	2	1
(United Kingdom) Geraldine Beamish	4	6	6

=== Bottom half ===
==== Section 3 ====
First round

Second round
(France) Germaine Golding	w/o
(Netherlands) Mme A. Diemer-Kool
(France) Jeanne Vaussard	6	6
(Belgium) Simone Washer	0	0
(France) Genevieve Cousin	6	6
(Belgium) Leonie L'Hoest	1	1
(France) Diddie Vlasto	6	6
(United States) Isabella Mumford	1	4

Third round
(France) Germaine Golding	6	6
(France) Jeanne Vaussard	3	1
(France) Genevieve Cousin	6	1
(France) Diddie Vlasto	8	6

Quarterfinals
(France) Germaine Golding	2	7	6
(France) Diddie Vlasto	6	5	2

==== Section 4 ====
First round
(Belgium) Marie Storms	6	6
(France) Nanette le Besnerais	4	3
(France) Marie Danet	6	6
(United Kingdom) Mrs Hillyard	0	0
(France) Yvonne Bourgeois	2	1
(United Kingdom) Kitty McKane	6	6

Second round
(France) Marguerite Billout	6	6
(France) Mlle Lecaron	0	2
(France) Mme Canivet	6	8
(United States) Leslie Bancroft	4	6
(Belgium) Marie Storms	8	6
(France) Marie Danet	6	3
(France) Blanche Amblard	0	0
(United Kingdom) Kitty McKane	6	6

Third round
(France) Marguerite Billout	6	6
(France) Mme Canivet	3	1
(Belgium) Marie Storms	2	1
(United Kingdom) Kitty McKane	6	6

Quarterfinals
(France) Marguerite Billout	2	5
(United Kingdom) Kitty McKane	6	7
