= 1914 World Hard Court Championships – Women's singles =

Women's singles
- 1914 World Hard Court Championships

Final
- Champion: (France) Suzanne Lenglen
- Runner-up: (France) Germaine Golding
- Score: 6–2, 6–1

Details
- Draw: 19

Events
Singles	men	women
Doubles	men	women	mixed
- World Hard Court Championships

The women's singles was one of five events of the 1914 World Hard Court Championships tennis tournament held in Paris, France from 29 May until 8 June 1914. The draw consisted of 19 players. Mieken Rieck was the defending champion, but did not participate. Suzanne Lenglen(who also won the women's double championship that year) won her first of four titles, defeating fellow French player Germaine Golding in straight sets in the final.

== Draw ==
Suzanne Lenglen playing baseline 1914

Key

- Q = Qualifier
- WC = Wild card
- LL = Lucky loser
- Alt = Alternate
- ITF = ITF entry
- PR = Protected ranking
- SR = Special ranking
- SE = Special exempt
- JE = Junior exempt
- JR = Junior Accelerator Programme entrant
- CO = College Accelerator Programme entrant
- NG = Next Gen Accelerator Program entrant
- w/o = Walkover
- r = Retired
- d = Defaulted

=== Finals ===
Semifinals
(France) Suzanne Lenglen	6	4	6
(France) Suzanne Amblard	2	6	3
(France) Marguerite Broquedis	2	2
(France) Germaine Golding	6	6

Final
(France) Suzanne Lenglen	6	6
(France) Germaine Golding	2	1

=== Top half ===
First round
(Belgium) Anne de Borman	w/o
(Hungary) Hedwig von Satzger
(France) Mlle Poujade	6	8	6
(Norway) Caro Dahl	3	10	4

Second round
(France) Suzanne Lenglen	6	8
(France) Phyllis Satterthwaite	3	6
(Belgium) Anne de Borman	6	6
(France) Mlle Poujade	3	1
(France) Magda Aranyi	w/o
(United Kingdom) M. Tripp
(France) Suzanne Amblard	6	6
(Portugal) Angelica Plantier	0	1

Quarterfinals
(France) Suzanne Lenglen	6	6
(Belgium) Anne de Borman	2	3
(France) Magda Aranyi	0	0
(France) Suzanne Amblard	6	6

Semifinals
(France) Suzanne Lenglen	6	4	6
(France) Suzanne Amblard	2	6	3

=== Bottom half ===
First round
(France) Blanche Amblard	6	6
(Sweden) Sigrid Fick	3	3

Second round
(France) Marguerite Broquedis	6	6
(France) Blanche Amblard	3	3
(United States) Elizabeth Ryan	6	6	6
(France) Marie Conquet	8	4	0
(United Kingdom) M. Fergus	6	6
(Switzerland) Cecile Matthey	2	2
(France) Germaine Golding	w/o
(United Kingdom) J. Tripp

Quarterfinals
(France) Marguerite Broquedis	4	2
(United States) Elizabeth Ryan	6	6
(United Kingdom) M. Fergus	3	10	1
(France) Germaine Golding	6	8	6

Semifinals
(France) Marguerite Broquedis	2	2
(France) Germaine Golding	6	6
