= 1923 World Hard Court Championships – Women's doubles =

Women's doubles
- 1923 World Hard Court Championships

Final
- Champions: (United Kingdom) Winifred Beamish (United Kingdom) Kitty McKane
- Runners-up: (France) Germaine Golding (France) Suzanne Lenglen
- Score: 6–2, 6–3

Events
Singles	men	women
Doubles	men	women	mixed
← 1922 ·	World Hard Court Championships

Winifred Beamish and Kitty McKane defeated Germaine Golding and Suzanne Lenglen 6–2, 6–3 to win the women's doubles tennis title at the 1923 World Hard Court Championships. Lenglen and Elizabeth Ryan were the defending champions, with Ryan not participating this year.

== Draw ==
Key

- Q = Qualifier
- WC = Wild card
- LL = Lucky loser
- Alt = Alternate
- ITF = ITF entry
- PR = Protected ranking
- SR = Special ranking
- SE = Special exempt
- JE = Junior exempt
- JR = Junior Accelerator Programme entrant
- CO = College Accelerator Programme entrant
- NG = Next Gen Accelerator Program entrant
- w/o = Walkover
- r = Retired
- d = Defaulted

=== Draw ===
1st round
(United Kingdom) Geraldine Beamish (United Kingdom) Kitty McKane	6	6
(France) Mme Canivet (France) Mme de Rauch	1	2
(Belgium) Anne de Borman (Belgium) Marie Storms	0	6	6
(France) Mme Florand (France) Mlle Lecaron	6	4	3
(France) Germaine Charnelet (France) Mlle Chanclaire	3	4
(France) Genevieve Cousin (France) Suzanne Deve	6	6
(Spain) Lili de Alvarez (France) Jeanne Vaussard	6	5	6
(France) Yvonne Bourgeois (France) Marguerite Billout	2	7	4
(United States) Leslie Bancroft (United States) Eleanor Goss	6	6
(France) Marie Conquet (France) Marie Danet	3	2
(France) Mme Delageniere (United Kingdom) Miss Lammin	w/o
? ?
(United States) Isabella Mumford (United States) Eleanora Sears	2	2
(France) Nanette le Besnerais (France) Diddie Vlasto	6	6
(Netherlands) Kea Bouman (Belgium) Leonie l'Hoest	1	1
(France) Germaine Golding (France) Suzanne Lenglen	6	6

Quarterfinals
(United Kingdom) Geraldine Beamish (United Kingdom) Kitty McKane	w/o
(Belgium) Anne de Borman (Belgium) Marie Storms
(France) Genevieve Cousin (France) Suzanne Deve	2	4
(Spain) Lili de Alvarez (France) Jeanne Vaussard	6	6
(United States) Leslie Bancroft (United States) Eleanor Goss	w/o
(France) Mme Delageniere (United Kingdom) Miss Lammin
(France) Nanette le Besnerais (France) Diddie Vlasto	2	2
(France) Germaine Golding (France) Suzanne Lenglen	6	6

Semifinals
(United Kingdom) Geraldine Beamish (United Kingdom) Kitty McKane	6	6
(Spain) Lili de Alvarez (France) Jeanne Vaussard	2	0
(United States) Leslie Bancroft (United States) Eleanor Goss	3	1
(France) Germaine Golding (France) Suzanne Lenglen	6	6

Finals
(United Kingdom) Geraldine Beamish (United Kingdom) Kitty McKane	6	6
(France) Germaine Golding (France) Suzanne Lenglen	2	3
