= Tennis at the 1920 Summer Olympics =

- Date: 16–24 August 1920
- Edition: 6th
- Surface: Grass / outdoor
- Location: Beerschot Tennis Club, Kontich

Champions

Men's singles
- Louis Raymond (RSA)

Women's singles
- Suzanne Lenglen (FRA)

Men's doubles
- Noel Turnbull / Max Woosnam (GBR)

Women's doubles
- Kathleen McKane / Winifred McNair (GBR)

Mixed doubles
- Suzanne Lenglen / Max Decugis (FRA)
- Summer Olympics

Final results for the Tennis competition at the 1920 Summer Olympics in Antwerp, Belgium. The competition was held from Monday, 16 August 1920 to Tuesday, 24 August 1920.

== Medal summary ==
=== Events ===
Event	Gold	Silver	Bronze
Men's singles	Louis Raymond; South Africa	Ichiya Kumagae; Japan	Charles Winslow; South Africa
Men's doubles	Great Britain; Noel Turnbull; Max Woosnam	Japan; Seiichiro Kashio; Ichiya Kumagae	France; Pierre Albarran; Max Decugis
Women's singles	Suzanne Lenglen; France	Dorothy Holman; Great Britain	Kathleen McKane; Great Britain
Women's doubles	Great Britain; Kathleen McKane; Winifred McNair	Great Britain; Winifred Beamish; Dorothy Holman	France; Élisabeth d'Ayen; Suzanne Lenglen
Mixed doubles	France; Suzanne Lenglen; Max Decugis	Great Britain; Kathleen McKane; Max Woosnam	Czechoslovakia; Milada Skrbková; Ladislav Žemla

=== Medal table ===
Rank	Nation	Gold	Silver	Bronze	Total
1	Great Britain	2	3	1	6
2	France	2	0	2	4
3	South Africa	1	0	1	2
4	Japan	0	2	0	2
5	Czechoslovakia	0	0	1	1
Totals (5 entries)		5	5	5	15

== Participating nations ==
A total of 75 tennis players (52 men and 23 women) from 14 nations (men from 14 nations - women from 8 nations) competed at the Antwerp Games:

- Australia (1) (men:1 women:0)
- Belgium (16) (men:8 women:8)
- Czechoslovakia (7) (men:6 women:1)
- Denmark (3) (men:1 women:2)
- France (10) (men:7 women:3)
- Great Britain (8) (men:4 women:4)
- Greece (1) (men:1 women:0)
- Italy (4) (men:3 women:1)
- Japan (2) (men:2 women:0)
- Norway (3) (men:2 women:1)
- South Africa (5) (men:5 women:0)
- Spain (4) (men:4 women:0)
- Sweden (8) (men:5 women:3)
- Switzerland (3) (men:3 women:0)
