= 1914 World Hard Court Championships – Women's doubles =

Women's doubles
- 1914 World Hard Court Championships

Final
- Champions: (France) Suzanne Lenglen (United States) Elizabeth Ryan
- Runners-up: (France) Blanche Amblard (France) Suzanne Amblard
- Score: 6–0, 6–0

Events
| Singles | men | women |
| Doubles | men | women | mixed |
| World Hard Court Championships | · 1920 → |

The Women's Doubles was one of five events at the 1914 World Hard Court Championships, held in Paris from 29 May until 8 June 1914. Suzanne Lenglen and Elizabeth Ryan won the inaugural title, defeating twin sisters Blanche Amblard and Suzanne Amblard 6–0, 6–0 in the final.

== Draw ==
=== Key ===
- Q = Qualifier
- WC = Wild card
- LL = Lucky loser
- Alt = Alternate
- SE = Special exempt
- PR = Protected ranking
- ITF = ITF entry
- JE = Junior exempt
- w/o = Walkover
- r = Retired
- d = Defaulted
- SR = Special ranking

=== Draw ===
Quarterfinals
(France) Suzanne Lenglen (United States) Elizabeth Ryan | 6 | 6
(Belgium) Anne de Borman (United Kingdom) M. Fergus | 3 | 3
(Sweden) Sigrid Fick (United Kingdom) Phyllis Satterthwaite | 6 | 6
(France) Marie Conquet (France) Germaine Golding | 2 | 2
(Norway) Caro Dahl (Switzerland) Cecile Matthey | w/o
(United Kingdom) J. Tripp (United Kingdom) M. Tripp
(France) Blanche Amblard (France) Suzanne Amblard | 6 | 6
(France) Marguerite Broquedis (Norway) Anna Isdahl | 2 | 3

Semifinals
(France) Suzanne Lenglen (United States) Elizabeth Ryan | 6 | 6
(Sweden) Sigrid Fick (United Kingdom) Phyllis Satterthwaite | 1 | 3
(Norway) Caro Dahl (Switzerland) Cecile Matthey | 1 | 1
(France) Blanche Amblard (France) Suzanne Amblard | 6 | 6

Finals
(France) Suzanne Lenglen (United States) Elizabeth Ryan | 6 | 6
(France) Blanche Amblard (France) Suzanne Amblard | 0 | 0
