= 1922 World Hard Court Championships – Men's singles =

Men's singles
- 1922 World Hard Court Championships

Final
- Champion: (France) Henri Cochet
- Runner-up: (Spain) Manuel de Gomar
- Score: 6–0, 2–6, 4–6, 6–1, 6–2

Details
- Draw: 62

Events
Singles	men	women
Doubles	men	women	mixed
- World Hard Court Championships

The men's singles was one of five events of the 1922 World Hard Court Championships tennis tournament held in Brussels, Belgium from 13 until 21 May 1922. The draw consisted of 62 players. Bill Tilden was the defending champion, but did not participate. Frenchman Henri Cochet won the title after defeating Spaniard Manuel de Gomar in the final.

== Draw ==
Key

- Q = Qualifier
- WC = Wild card
- LL = Lucky loser
- Alt = Alternate
- ITF = ITF entry
- PR = Protected ranking
- SR = Special ranking
- SE = Special exempt
- JE = Junior exempt
- JR = Junior Accelerator Programme entrant
- CO = College Accelerator Programme entrant
- NG = Next Gen Accelerator Program entrant
- w/o = Walkover
- r = Retired
- d = Defaulted

=== Finals ===
Quarterfinals
(Spain) Manuel de Gomar	6	6	6
(Switzerland) Charles Aeschlimann	0	1	2
(Belgium) Maurice v.d. Bemden	5	3	7	3
(France) Jean Borotra	7	6	5	6
(Spain) Manuel Alonso	3	3	6	4
(France) Henri Cochet	6	6	4	6
(Belgium) Georges Watson	4	3	6	2
(Romania) Nicolae Mişu	6	6	4	6

Semifinals
(Spain) Manuel de Gomar	4	8	6	6
(France) Jean Borotra	6	6	1	0
(France) Henri Cochet	4	6	6	6
(Romania) Nicolae Mişu	6	2	2	1

Final
(Spain) Manuel de Gomar	0	6	6	1	2
(France) Henri Cochet	6	2	4	6	6

=== Top half ===
==== Section 1 ====
First round
(United Kingdom) Francis Lowe	6	6	6
(Belgium) Weber	0	1	0
(Belgium) Jean Washer	w/o
(United Kingdom) G.E. Hill
(Spain) Manuel de Gomar	6	8	6
(Italy) Mino Balbi de Robecco	4	6	2
(Czechoslovakia) Rázný Zemla	w/o
(Switzerland) Alberto Henri Chiesa
(Switzerland) Charles Aeschlimann	w/o
(Italy) Umberto de Morpurgo
(Belgium) P. de Becker	1	2	0
(France) J. Sabès	6	6	6
(Italy) Alberto Bonacossa	w/o
(France) Paul Féret

Second round
(Spain) Eduardo Flaquer	6	1	6	6
(United Kingdom) Francis Lowe	3	6	2	2
(Belgium) Jean Washer	3	2	12	4
(Spain) Manuel de Gomar	6	6	10	6
(Czechoslovakia) Rázný Zemla	0	2	1
(Switzerland) Charles Aeschlimann	6	6	6
(France) J. Sabès	6	6	2	6
(Italy) Alberto Bonacossa	4	3	6	2

Third round
(Spain) Eduardo Flaquer	5	4	4
(Spain) Manuel de Gomar	7	6	6
(Switzerland) Charles Aeschlimann	6	6	6
(France) J. Sabès	3	2	3

Quarterfinals
(Spain) Manuel de Gomar	6	6	6
(Switzerland) Charles Aeschlimann	0	1	2

==== Section 2 ====
First round
(France) Alain Gerbault	w/o
(Netherlands) Gerard Scheurleer
(Belgium) Stéphane Halot	4	1
(Australia) Stanley Doust	6	3^{r}
(Belgium) Maurice v.d. Bemden	6	6	6
(United Kingdom) C.E. Leonard Lyle	4	0	1
(United Kingdom) Arthur Wallis Myers	w/o
(Switzerland) J. d'Espine
(India) Ali-Hassan Fyzee	w/o
(South Africa) Brian Norton
(Czechoslovakia) Friedrich Röhrer	6	6	6
(Belgium) André Laloux	4	2	4
(France) Marcel Dupont	6	6	6
(Denmark) Svend Olsen	4	1	2
(France) Jean Borotra	6	6	2	6
(Greece) Augustos Zerlendis	2	4	6	1

Second round
(France) Alain Gerbault	6	4	6	7
(Belgium) Stéphane Halot	2	6	3	5
(Belgium) Maurice v.d. Bemden	6	6	6
(United Kingdom) Arthur Wallis Myers	4	2	1
(India) Ali-Hassan Fyzee	6	2	6	7
(Czechoslovakia) Friedrich Röhrer	2	6	3	5
(France) Marcel Dupont	2	10	6	6	5
(France) Jean Borotra	6	12	4	2	7

Third round
(France) Alain Gerbault	7	2	7	8	4
(Belgium) Maurice v.d. Bemden	5	6	9	6	6
(India) Ali-Hassan Fyzee	6	1	8	2	4
(France) Jean Borotra	3	6	6	6	6

Quarterfinals
(Belgium) Maurice v.d. Bemden	5	3	7	3
(France) Jean Borotra	7	6	5	6

=== Bottom half ===
==== Section 3 ====
First round
(Netherlands) Kick van Lennep	6	6	6
(Italy) G.L.A. Brian	4	2	0
(Belgium) G. Triest	6	6	6
(Czechoslovakia) Sláva Ardelt-Robětín	1	2	4
(Switzerland) Pablo Debran	w/o
(United States) Dean Mathey
(Spain) Manuel Alonso	6	6	6
(Czechoslovakia) Pavel Macenauer	2	2	1
(Belgium) R.H. Spaak	w/o
(United Kingdom) Hamilton Price
(United Kingdom) John Gilbert	w/o
(France) André Gobert
(Netherlands) Maas van der Feen	6	6	5	2	6
(Denmark) Erik Tegner	3	1	7	6	2
(France) Henri Cochet	6	6	4	6
(Italy) Riccardo Sabbadini	2	4	6	3

Second round
(Netherlands) Kick van Lennep	6	6	6
(Belgium) G. Triest	2	0	4
(Switzerland) Pablo Debran
(Spain) Manuel Alonso	w/o
(Belgium) R.H. Spaak	1	3	6	1
(United Kingdom) John Gilbert	6	6	4	6
(Netherlands) Maas van der Feen	4	4	4
(France) Henri Cochet	6	6	6

Third round
(Netherlands) Kick van Lennep	4	3	2
(Spain) Manuel Alonso	6	6	6
(United Kingdom) John Gilbert	5	3	3
(France) Henri Cochet	7	6	6

Quarterfinals
(Spain) Manuel Alonso	3	3	6	4
(France) Henri Cochet	6	6	4	6

==== Section 4 ====
First round
(Spain) Jose Maria Alonso	6	6	6
Vertaing	1	1	1
(Belgium) W. Lemaire de Warzeé	w/o
(United Kingdom) Ernest Lamb
(Italy) Cesare Colombo	6	6	6
(Switzerland) Maurice Ferrier	1	1	3
(Belgium) Georges Watson	6	3	2	8	6
(United Kingdom) Jack Hillyard	3	6	6	6	2
(France) René Lacoste	6	6	5	0	6
(United Kingdom) Herbert Roper-Barrett	4	4	7	6	0
(France) J.T. de Poncheville	6	6	6
(Belgium) R. Laloux	3	0	1
(Romania) Nicolae Mişu	6	6	6
(France) Pierre du Pasquier	2	3	1

Second round
(Spain) Jose Maria Alonso	w/o
(Belgium) W. Lemaire de Warzeé
(Italy) Cesare Colombo	6	4	3	6	1
(Belgium) Georges Watson	3	6	6	4	6
(France) René Lacoste	6	6	7
(France) J.T. de Poncheville	0	1	5
(Romania) Nicolae Mişu	6	6	6
(Switzerland) R. de Graffenried	4	1	1

Third round
(Spain) Jose Maria Alonso	4	1	3
(Belgium) Georges Watson	6	6	6
(France) René Lacoste	2	3	2
(Romania) Nicolae Mişu	6	6	6

Quarterfinals
(Belgium) Georges Watson	4	3	6	2
(Romania) Nicolae Mişu	6	6	4	6
