= 1922 World Hard Court Championships – Women's singles =

Women's singles
- 1922 World Hard Court Championships

Final
- Champion: (France) Suzanne Lenglen
- Runner-up: (United States) Elizabeth Ryan
- Score: 6–3, 6–2

Details
- Draw: 34

Events
Singles	men	women
Doubles	men	women	mixed
- World Hard Court Championships

The women's singles was one of five events of the 1922 World Hard Court Championships tennis tournament held in Brussels, Belgium from 13 until 21 May 1922. The draw consisted of 34 players. Suzanne Lenglen successfully defended her title, defeating Elizabeth Ryan 6–3, 6–2 in the final.

== Draw ==
=== Finals ===
Quarterfinals
(France) Suzanne Lenglen	6	6
(Belgium) Pauline Alison	0	0
(United Kingdom) Phyllis Satterthwaite	5	2
(United Kingdom) Kitty McCane	7	6
(Belgium) Anne de Borman	6	6
(Belgium) Marie Storms	4	2
(United Kingdom) Geraldine Beamish	2	2
(United States) Elizabeth Ryan	6	6

Semifinals
(France) Suzanne Lenglen	10	6
(United Kingdom) Kitty McCane	8	2
(Belgium) Anne de Borman	2	0
(United States) Elizabeth Ryan	6	6

Finals
(France) Suzanne Lenglen	6	6
(United States) Elizabeth Ryan	3	2

=== Top half ===
==== Section 1 ====
First round
(Belgium) Mlle Jolz	w/o
(France) Daisy Speranza

Second round
(France) Suzanne Lenglen	6	6
(Belgium) H. van der Kindere	0	0
(Belgium) Marthe Dupont	6	6
(Belgium) Mlle Jolz	1	4
(United Kingdom) Evelyn Colyer	4	6	6
(Belgium) Mme Janssens	6	2	2
(Belgium) Pauline Alison	w/o
(Belgium) Mme du Pasquier

Third round
(France) Suzanne Lenglen	6	6
(Belgium) Marthe Dupont	0	0
(United Kingdom) Evelyn Colyer	3	6	7
(Belgium) Pauline Alison	6	0	9

Quarterfinals
(France) Suzanne Lenglen	6	6
(Belgium) Pauline Alison	0	0

==== Section 2 ====
First round

Second round
(United Kingdom) Phyllis Satterthwaite	6	6
(Czechoslovakia) Mme Lobkowiczova	0	0
(France) Yvonne Bourgeois	6	6
(Belgium) Mme Taudin-Chabot	2	1
(Belgium) Mme Grisar	w/o
(France) Nanette le Besnerais
(United Kingdom) Kitty McCane	6	6
(Belgium) Mlle Sagliardi	0	2

Third round
(United Kingdom) Phyllis Satterthwaite	6	6
(France) Yvonne Bourgeois	1	0
(Belgium) Mme Grisar	1	0
(United Kingdom) Kitty McCane	6	6

Quarterfinals
(United Kingdom) Phyllis Satterthwaite	5	2
(United Kingdom) Kitty McCane	7	6

=== Bottom half ===
==== Section 3 ====
First round
(Belgium) Mlle Itner	3	3
(France) Doris Wolfson	6	6

Second round
(Belgium) Anne de Borman	6	6
(Czechoslovakia) Gretel Röhrer	2	0
(United Kingdom) Dorothy Kemmis-Betty	6	6
(France) Doris Wolfson	0	3
(United Kingdom) Mrs. Hunter	6	9
(Belgium) Mlle de Spirlet	4	7
(Belgium) Marie Storms	6	6
(Italy) Giulia Perelli	1	3

Third round
(Belgium) Anne de Borman	8	2	7
(United Kingdom) Dorothy Kemmis-Betty	6	6	5
(United Kingdom) Mrs. Hunter	2	1
(Belgium) Marie Storms	6	6

Quarterfinals
(Belgium) Anne de Borman	6	6
(Belgium) Marie Storms	4	2

==== Section 4 ====
First round

Second round
(United Kingdom) Geraldine Beamish	6	6
(Belgium) Mlle Brigode	1	1
(France) Germaine Pigueron	6	6
(Belgium) Loes Everts	1	4
(United Kingdom) Irene Peacock	6	6
(Belgium) Mme Jones	1	0
(France) Marguerite Billout
(United States) Elizabeth Ryan	w/o

Third round
(United Kingdom) Geraldine Beamish	6	6
(France) Germaine Pigueron	3	3
(United Kingdom) Irene Peacock	6	6	2
(United States) Elizabeth Ryan	1	8	6

Quarterfinals
(United Kingdom) Geraldine Beamish	2	2
(United States) Elizabeth Ryan	6	6
