= 1922 World Hard Court Championships – Women's doubles =

Women's doubles
- 1922 World Hard Court Championships

Final
- Champions: (France) Suzanne Lenglen (United States) Elizabeth Ryan
- Runners-up: (United Kingdom) Winifred Beamish (United Kingdom) Kitty McKane
- Score: 6–0, 6–4

Events
Singles	men	women
Doubles	men	women	mixed
- World Hard Court Championships

The women's doubles was one of five events at the 1922 World Hard Court Championships. Germaine Golding and Suzanne Lenglen were the defending champions. Golding did not participate, but Lenglen partnered with Elizabeth Ryan to win her third title and second with Ryan, defeating Winifred Beamish and Kitty McKane 6–0, 6–4 in the final.

== Draw ==
Key

- Q = Qualifier
- WC = Wild card
- LL = Lucky loser
- Alt = Alternate
- ITF = ITF entry
- PR = Protected ranking
- SR = Special ranking
- SE = Special exempt
- JE = Junior exempt
- JR = Junior Accelerator Programme entrant
- CO = College Accelerator Programme entrant
- NG = Next Gen Accelerator Program entrant
- w/o = Walkover
- r = Retired
- d = Defaulted

=== Draw ===
1st round
(Belgium) Loes Everts (Belgium) Mme Taudin-Chabot	1	1
(United Kingdom) Irene Peacock (United Kingdom) Phyllis Satterthwaite	6	6
(France) Yvonne Bourgeois (France) Doris Wolfson	4	6	1
(United Kingdom) Mrs. Hunter (United Kingdom) Dorothy Kemmis-Betty	6	4	6
(Belgium) Pauline Alison (United Kingdom) Evelyn Colyer	7	6
(Belgium) Mme Grisar (Belgium) Mme Jones	5	0
(Belgium) Mlle Itner (France) Daisy Speranza	4	6	5
(Belgium) Mme Janssens (Belgium) Marie Storms	6	4	7
(Belgium) Mlle Gagliardi (Italy) Giulia Perelli	1	12
(United Kingdom) Kitty McKane (United Kingdom) Geraldine Beamish	6	14

2nd round
(France) Suzanne Lenglen (United States) Elizabeth Ryan	6	6
(Belgium) Anne de Borman (Belgium) Marthe Dupont	3	1
(United Kingdom) Irene Peacock (United Kingdom) Phyllis Satterthwaite	6	6
(United Kingdom) Mrs. Hunter (United Kingdom) Dorothy Kemmis-Betty	0	3
(Belgium) Pauline Alison (United Kingdom) Evelyn Colyer	w/o
(France) Marguerite Billout (France) Germaine Pigueron
(Belgium) Mme Janssens (Belgium) Marie Storms	2	0
(United Kingdom) Kitty McKane (United Kingdom) Geraldine Beamish	6	6

Semifinals
(France) Suzanne Lenglen (United States) Elizabeth Ryan	6	6
(United Kingdom) Irene Peacock (United Kingdom) Phyllis Satterthwaite	1	3
(Belgium) Pauline Alison (United Kingdom) Evelyn Colyer	4	2
(United Kingdom) Kitty McKane (United Kingdom) Geraldine Beamish	6	6

Final
(France) Suzanne Lenglen (United States) Elizabeth Ryan	6	6
(United Kingdom) Kitty McKane (United Kingdom) Geraldine Beamish	0	4
