= Suzanne Laurencin =

Belgian tennis player

Personal information
- Nationality: Belgian
- Born: 23 April 1893 Antwerp
- Died: 26 October 1970 (aged 77) Cannes

Sport
- Sport: Tennis

Suzanne Charlotte Laurencin (née Good; 23 April 1893 – 26 October 1970) was a Belgian tennis player. She competed in the women's doubles event at the 1920 Summer Olympics.
