= 1922 World Hard Court Championships =

- Date: 13–21 May
- Edition: 6th
- Category: World Championship
- Surface: Clay / outdoor
- Location: Brussels, Belgium
- Venue: Royal Léopold Club

Champions

Men's singles
- (France) Henri Cochet

Women's singles
- (France) Suzanne Lenglen

Men's doubles
- (France) Jean Borotra (France) Henri Cochet

Women's doubles
- (France) Suzanne Lenglen (United States) Elizabeth Ryan

Mixed doubles
- (France) Henri Cochet (France) Suzanne Lenglen
- World Hard Court Championships

The 1922 World Hard Court Championships (WHCC) (French: Championnats du Monde de Tennis sur Terre Battue) was the sixth edition of the World Hard Court Championships tennis tournament, considered as the precursor to the French Open. For the first time, the Championships were not held in Paris, but instead on the clay courts of the Royal Léopold Club in Brussels, Belgium, from 13 until 21 May 1922.

For the second year in a row, Suzanne Lenglen won the singles, doubles and mixed doubles events.

== Finals ==
=== Men's singles ===
(France) Henri Cochet defeated (Spain) Manuel de Gomar, 6–0, 2–6, 4–6, 6–1, 6–2

=== Women's singles ===
(France) Suzanne Lenglen defeated (United States) Elizabeth Ryan, 6–3, 6–2

=== Men's doubles ===
(France) Jean Borotra / (France) Henri Cochet defeated (France) Marcel Dupont / (Romania) Nicolae Mişu, 6–8, 6–1, 6–2, 6–3

=== Women's doubles ===
(France) Suzanne Lenglen / (United States) Elizabeth Ryan defeated (United Kingdom) Winifred Beamish / (United Kingdom) Kitty McKane, 6–0, 6–4

=== Mixed doubles ===
(France) Henri Cochet / (France) Suzanne Lenglen defeated (United Kingdom) Brian Gilbert / (United Kingdom) Geraldine Beamish, 6–4, 4–6, 6–0
