= Lucienne Tschaggeny =

Belgian tennis player

Personal information
- Full name: Lucienne Marthe Marie Françoise Tschaggeny
- Nationality: Belgian
- Born: 26 September 1891 Brussels, Belgium
- Died: Unknown

Sport
- Sport: Tennis

Lucienne Tschaggeny (born 26 September 1891, date of death unknown) was a Belgian tennis player. She competed in the women's doubles event at the 1920 Summer Olympics.
