= 1914 World Hard Court Championships – Men's singles =

Men's singles
- 1914 World Hard Court Championships

Final
- Champion: (New Zealand) Anthony Wilding
- Runner-up: (Austria) Ludwig von Salm-Hoogstraeten
- Score: 6–0, 6–2, 6–4

Details
- Draw: 43

Events
Singles	men	women
Doubles	men	women	mixed
- World Hard Court Championships

The men's singles was one of five events of the 1914 World Hard Court Championships tennis tournament held in Paris, France from 29 May until 8 June 1914. The draw consisted of 43 players. Anthony Wilding successfully defended his title, beating Ludwig von Salm-Hoogstraeten in straight sets in the final.

== Draw ==
Key

- Q = Qualifier
- WC = Wild card
- LL = Lucky loser
- Alt = Alternate
- ITF = ITF entry
- PR = Protected ranking
- SR = Special ranking
- SE = Special exempt
- JE = Junior exempt
- JR = Junior Accelerator Programme entrant
- CO = College Accelerator Programme entrant
- NG = Next Gen Accelerator Program entrant
- w/o = Walkover
- r = Retired
- d = Defaulted

=== Finals ===
Quarterfinals
(France) Max Decugis	6	5	6	6
(Hungary) Béla von Kehrling	3	7	3	2
(United Kingdom) Algernon Kingscote	0	2	2
(New Zealand) Anthony Wilding	6	6	6
(France) A. Felix Poulin	5	6	2	6	3
(France) Maurice Germot	7	3	6	0	0^{r}
(France) André Gobert	5	3	3
(Austria) Ludwig von Salm	7	6	6

Semifinals
(France) Max Decugis	1	2	1
(New Zealand) Anthony Wilding	6	6	6
(France) A. Felix Poulin	2	4	4
(Austria) Ludwig von Salm	6	6	6

Final
(New Zealand) Anthony Wilding	6	6	6
(Austria) Ludwig von Salm	0	2	4

=== Top half ===
==== Section 1 ====
First round

Second round
(Belgium) Paul de Borman	6	6	6
(France) William Laurentz	1	2	4
(France) Max Decugis	6	6	6
(France) I. Aranyi	2	1	0
(Hungary) Béla von Kehrling	6	3	7	6
(Austria) O. Worisek	4	6	5	4
(Australia) Robert Kidston	w/o
(United States) Craig Biddle

Third round
(Belgium) Paul de Borman	1	0	2
(France) Max Decugis	6	6	6
(Hungary) Béla von Kehrling	6	6	6
(Australia) Robert Kidston	4	1	1

Quarterfinals
(France) Max Decugis	6	5	6	6
(Hungary) Béla von Kehrling	3	7	3	2

==== Section 2 ====
First round
(France) Albert Canet	w/o
P. Guillemant
(France) Etienne Micard	w/o
(Denmark) Leif Rovsing
(New Zealand) Anthony Wilding	w/o
(Germany) Fritz von Bissing
(Italy) Umberto de Morpurgo	w/o
(Germany) Otto Froitzheim
(Switzerland) Armand Simon	6	6	4	6
(France) Alain Gerbault	0	4	6	3
(United States) P. Townsend	w/o
(Germany) Heinrich Kleinschroth

Second round
(United Kingdom) Algernon Kingscote	6	6	6
(United Kingdom) Arthur Myers	2	2	2
(France) Albert Canet	w/o
(France) Etienne Micard
(New Zealand) Anthony Wilding	6	4	6	6
(Italy) Umberto de Morpurgo	0	6	0	1
(Switzerland) Arman Simon	6	6	6
(United States) P. Townsend	0	0	1

Third round
(United Kingdom) Algernon Kingscote	w/o
(France) Albert Canet
(New Zealand) Anthony Wilding	6	6	6
(Switzerland) Arman Simon	4	0	3

Quarterfinals
(United Kingdom) Algernon Kingscote	0	2	2
(New Zealand) Anthony Wilding	6	6	6

=== Bottom half ===
==== Section 3 ====
First round
(Germany) Luis Heyden	6	6	6	6
(France) A. Bonnal	4	3	8	4
(United Kingdom) Arthur Gore	6	6	6
(United Kingdom) C.R. Satterthwaite	3	0	4
(France) A. Felix Poulin	6	6	6
(Sweden) Henrik Fick	0	3	4
(France) George Manset	w/o
(Germany) Robert Kleinschroth
(France) Maurice Germot	6	6	1	6
(France) E. Chelli	2	3	6	3

Second round
(Germany) Luis Heyden	0	6	6	6
(United Kingdom) Arthur Gore	6	3	3	1
(France) A. Felix Poulin	?
(France) George Manset	?
(France) Maurice Germot	w/o
H.W.G. Ras
(Italy) J.S. de Morpurgo	w/o
(Australia) Alfred Dunlop

Third round
(Germany) Luis Heyden	1	6	4	2
(France) A. Felix Poulin	6	4	6	6
(France) Maurice Germot	6	6	6
(Italy) J.S. de Morpurgo	2	4	2

Quarterfinals
(France) A. Felix Poulin	5	6	2	6	3
(France) Maurice Germot	7	3	6	0	0^{r}

==== Section 4 ====
First round

Second round
(Belgium) A. Georges Watson	w/o
(Belgium) William du Vivier
(France) André Gobert	7	3	2	6	6
(France) A. Chancerel	5	6	6	4	4
(United Kingdom) Francis Lowe	6	6	6
(France) Georges Gault	4	3	4
(Austria) Ludwig von Salm	6	6	6
(Hungary) Jenő Zsigmondy	1	3	2

Third round
(Belgium) A. Georges Watson	2	1	7	1
(France) André Gobert	6	6	5	6
(United Kingdom) Francis Lowe	6	3	2	6	3
(Austria) Ludwig von Salm	3	6	6	3	6

Quarterfinals
(France) André Gobert	5	3	3
(Austria) Ludwig von Salm	7	6	6
