= Marie Jones (tennis) =

Belgian tennis player

Personal information
- Nationality: Belgian
- Born: 8 November 1887 Mechelen

Sport
- Sport: Tennis

Marguerite Marie Hendrika Fanny Hubertine Jones (born 8 November 1887, date of death unknown) was a Belgian tennis player. She competed in the women's doubles event at the 1920 Summer Olympics.
