= 1923 World Hard Court Championships =

- Date: 19–27 May
- Edition: 7th
- Category: World Championship
- Surface: Clay / outdoor
- Location: Saint-Cloud, Paris, France
- Venue: Stade Français

Champions

Men's singles
- (United States) Bill Johnston

Women's singles
- (France) Suzanne Lenglen

Men's doubles
- (France) Jacques Brugnon (France) Marcel Dupont

Women's doubles
- (United Kingdom) Geraldine Beamish (United Kingdom) Kitty McKane

Mixed doubles
- (France) Henri Cochet (France) Suzanne Lenglen
- World Hard Court Championships

The 1923 World Hard Court Championships (WHCC) (French: Championnats du Monde de Tennis sur Terre Battue) was the seventh and last edition of the World Hard Court Championships tennis tournament, considered as the precursor to the French Open. It was organised by the Fédération Française de Tennis and was held on the outdoor clay courts of the Stade Français at the Parc de Saint-Cloud in Paris from 19 May until 27 May 1923. Bill Johnston and Suzanne Lenglen won the singles titles.

== Men's singles ==
(United States) Bill Johnston defeated (Belgium) Jean Washer, 4–6, 6–2, 6–2, 4–6, 6–3

== Women's singles ==
(France) Suzanne Lenglen defeated (United Kingdom) Kitty McKane, 6–3, 6–3

== Men's doubles ==
(France) Jacques Brugnon / (France) Marcel Dupont defeated (France) Léonce Aslangul / (Italy) Uberto de Morpurgo, 10–12, 3–6, 6–2, 6–3, 6–4

== Women's doubles ==
(United Kingdom) Winifred Beamish / (United Kingdom) Kitty McKane defeated (France) Germaine Golding / (France) Suzanne Lenglen, 6–2, 6–3

== Mixed doubles ==
(France) Henri Cochet / (France) Suzanne Lenglen defeated (United Kingdom) Brian Gilbert / (United Kingdom) Kitty McKane, 6–2, 10–8
