= Pierre Hirsch =

French tennis player

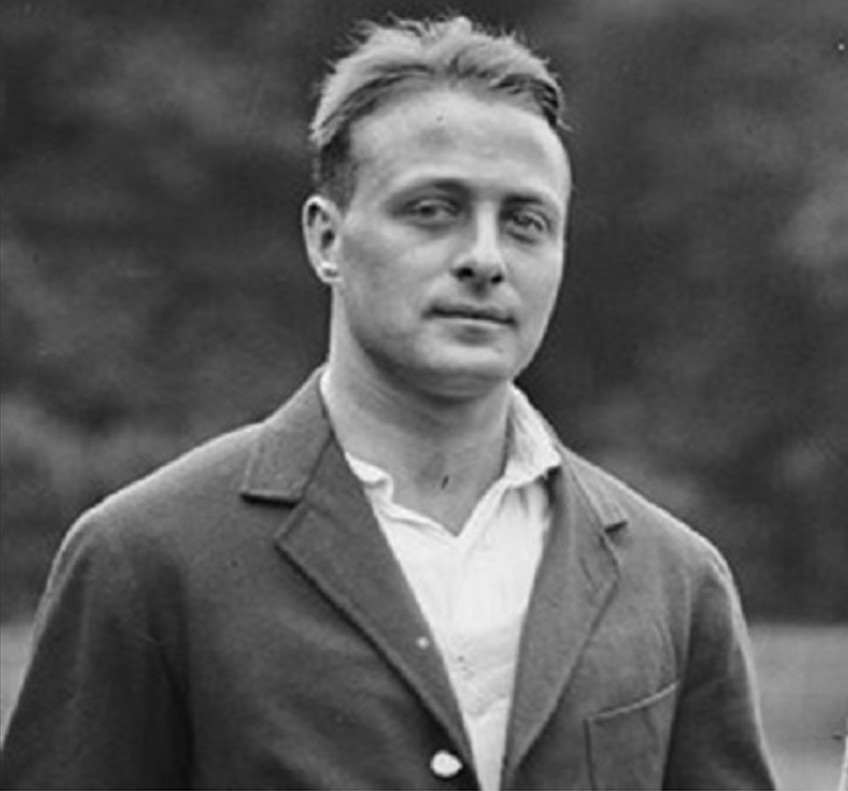

Personal information
- Nationality: French
- Born: 8 November 1900 Paris, France
- Died: 19 April 1942 (aged 41) Oświęcim, Poland

Sport
- Sport: Tennis

Pierre Hirsch (8 November 1900 – 19 April 1942) was a French tennis player. He competed in the mixed doubles event at the 1920 Summer Olympics. He died in the Auschwitz concentration camp.
