= Adrien Aron =

French tennis and bridge player, philately specialist

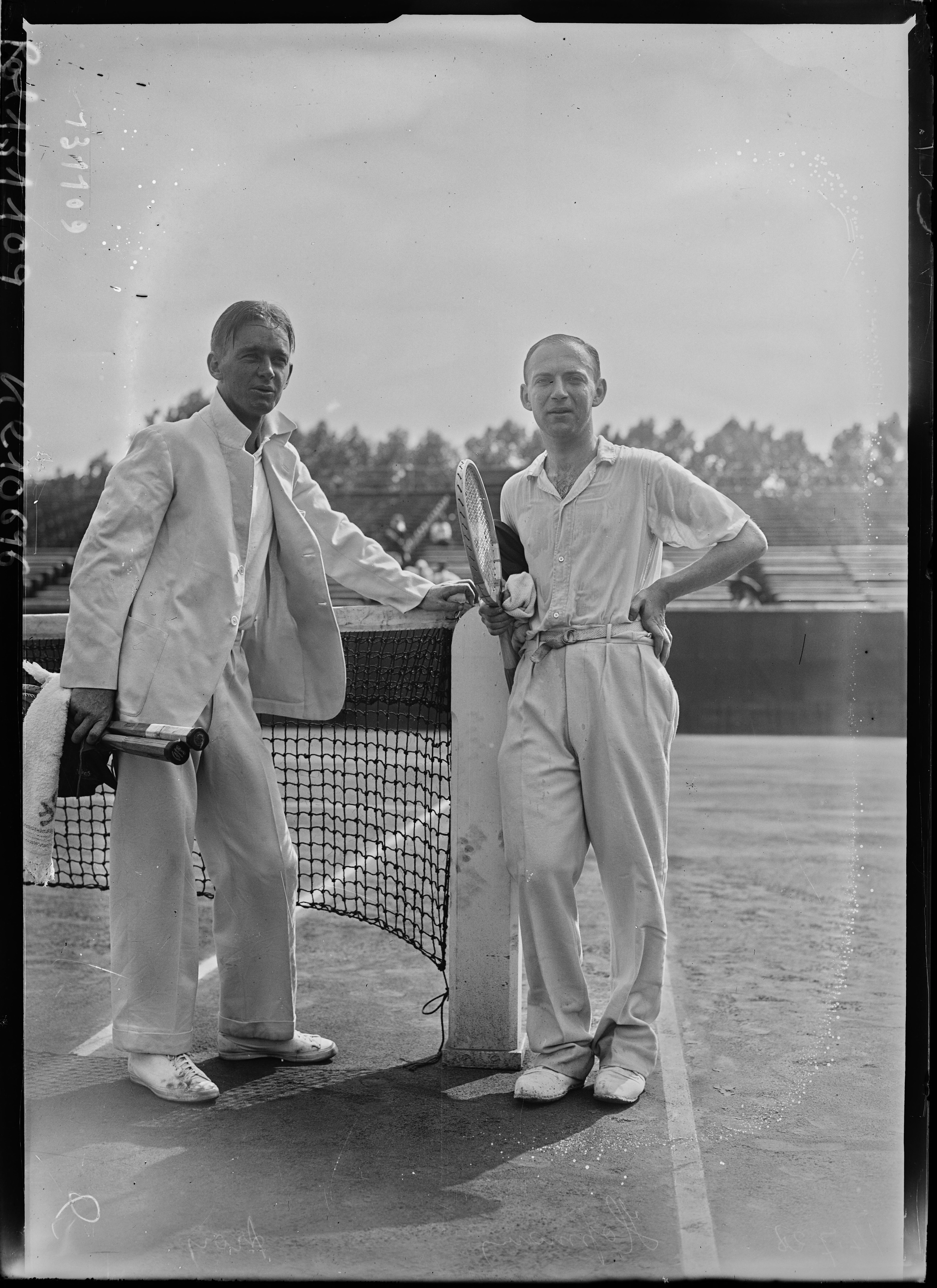
- Harry Hopman and Aron in 1928, during a France-Australia match at Roland Garros
- Born: April 29, 1902; Paris
- Died: November 30, 1969 (aged 67); Neuilly-sur-Seine
- Occupation(s): Tennis and bridge player, philately specialist

Adrien Aron (29 April 1902 in Paris – 30 November 1969 in Neuilly-sur-Seine), was a French tennis and bridge player, and a philately specialist.

== Biography ==
Adrien Aron was the older brother of philosopher Raymond Aron. He graduated with a law degree.

During the interwar period, he was described as "elegant, frequented the rich circles of tennis and gambling clubs; he perfectly embodied the man of pleasure, a type of man that my philosophical self despised and that perhaps a part of myself, barely conscious, humiliated by his sovereign lightness, admired or envied," said his brother.

=== Tennis career ===
He was described by Jean Samazeuilh as a "real machine to return the ball and a crocodile of the worst kind". However, he could not compete with the "Musketeers". At the end of 1928, he was ranked the eleventh best French player by the French Tennis Federation.

He won the Deauville tournament three times. He won the Porée Cup in 1928, defeating Louis Géraud in the final.

He participated six times in the French Championships between 1925 and 1931. Notably, he was defeated by the Hungarian champion Béla von Kehrling in 1926 and by Patrick Spence in five sets in 1927.

=== Bridge career ===
From the 1930s, he focused on bridge, becoming one of France's leading specialists in the game, alongside Pierre Albarran.

=== Philately ===
After the war, he gave up rackets and cards and became passionate about philately. In 1959, he published Les Secrets de la philatélie with Calmann-Lévy.

== Works ==
- Pierre Bellanger, Pierre Albarran, Adrien Aron, and Sophoklís Venizélos, Bridge, les 102 donnes d'un grand match, Grasset, Paris, 1933.
- Adrien Aron and Jean Fayard, L'art du bridge, Arthème Fayard, Paris, 1938.
- Adrien Aron, Les Secrets de la philatélie, Calmann-Lévy, Paris, 1959.
