= Suzanne Amblard =

French tennis player

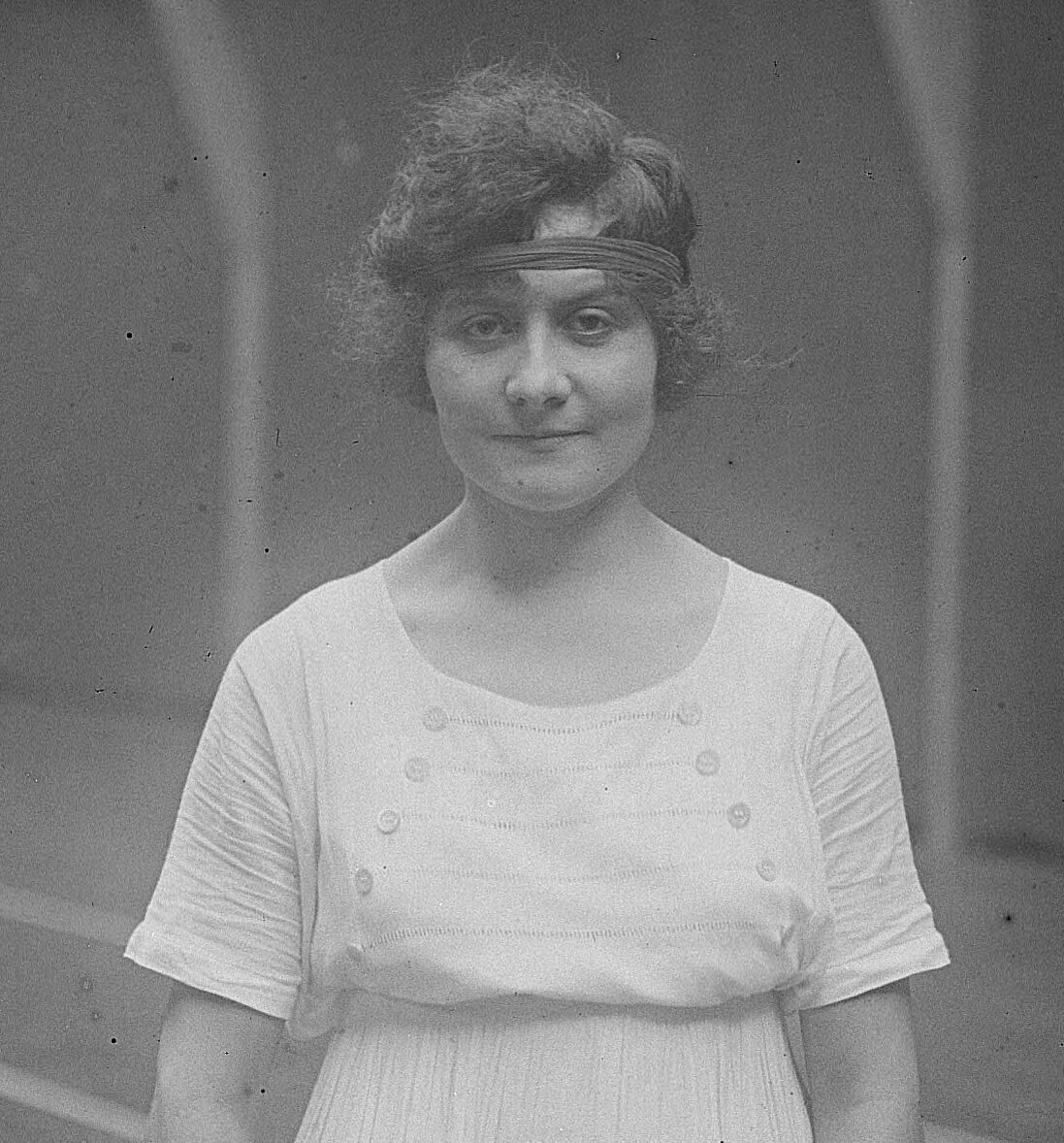
- Amblard in 1920
- Full name: Suzanne Emilie Amblard
- Country (sports): France
- Born: 9 September 1896 Ville d’Avray, France
- Died: 17 May 1980 (aged 83) Paris, France

Grand Slam singles results
- French Open: 1R (1920)

Other tournaments
- WHCC: SF (1913, 1914, 1920)

Grand Slam doubles results
- French Open: W (1913, 1914)

Other doubles tournaments
- WHCC: F (1914)

Grand Slam mixed doubles results
- French Open: F (1914)

Other mixed doubles tournaments
- WHCC: F (1920)

Suzanne Emilie Amblard (9 September 1896 – 17 May 1980) was a French tennis player. Amblard regularly played doubles with her twin sister Blanche. They won the French Championships in back-to-back years in 1913 and 1914. They also finished runner-up at the World Hard Court Championships in 1914 to Suzanne Lenglen and Elizabeth Ryan. Amblard also had success in singles, reaching the semifinals of the World Hard Court Championships three times. In one of those semifinals, she became one of only several players to win a set against Suzanne Lenglen, which she did in a three set loss. Amblard was ranked as the fourth best French women's tennis player in 1921, behind Lenglen, Marguerite Broquedis, and Germaine Golding.
