= Marguerite Chaudoir =

Belgian tennis player

Personal information
- Nationality: Belgian
- Born: 19 November 1885 Liège, Belgium
- Died: 24 December 1967 (aged 82) Liège, Belgium

Sport
- Sport: Tennis

Marguerite Chaudoir (née Trasenster; 19 November 1885 – 24 December 1967) was a Belgian tennis player. She competed in the women's doubles event with her niece, Marthe Dupont, at the 1920 Summer Olympics.
