= Nicolae Mișu =

Romanian politician (1858–1924)

Minister of Foreign Affairs of Romania
- In office 15 October 1919 – 30 November 1919
- Monarch: Ferdinand I
- Preceded by: Arthur Văitoianu
- Succeeded by: Alexandru Vaida-Voevod

Personal details
- Born: 6 August 1858 Bucharest, Principality of Wallachia
- Died: 31 August 1924 (aged 66) Bucharest, Kingdom of Romania

Nicolae Mișu (6 August 1858 – 31 August 1924) was a Romanian politician and diplomat who served as the Minister of Foreign Affairs of Romania.

== Life and political career ==
Mișu completed a law degree at the University of Göttingen in 1919 and political science studies in Paris. He was the first envoy of the Romanian monarch in Bulgaria. He also served as the Envoy Extraordinary and Plenipotentiary to Vienna, Constantinople, and London. While in London, he lobbied for protection of interests of Aromanians in Pind Mountains. He was also involved in discussions on rights of Jewish minority of Dobruja when it was split between Romania and Bulgaria. From 15 October until 30 November 1919, Mișu was Minister of Foreign Affairs of Romania within the Artur Văitoianu cabinet during which Romania became a signatory to the Treaty of Saint-Germain-en-Laye.

He died on 31 August 1924 in Bucharest.

== See also ==
- Foreign relations of Romania
