= Ladislav Žemla =

Czech tennis player (1887–1955)

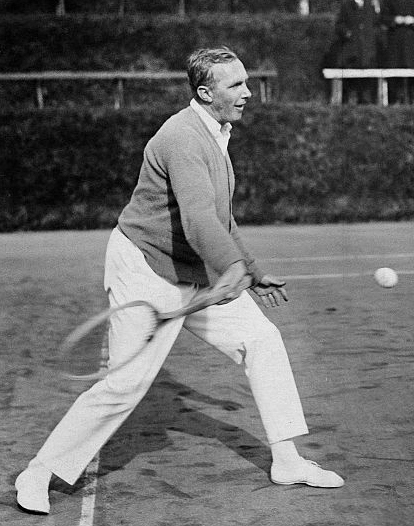
- Žemla in 1923
- Country (sports): Czechoslovakia
- Born: 6 November 1887; Kladruby, Austria-Hungary
- Died: 18 June 1955 (aged 67); Prague, Czechoslovakia
- Plays: Right-handed (one-handed backhand)

Singles

Grand Slam singles results
- Wimbledon: 3R (1926)

Other tournaments
- WHCC: 3R (1923)
- Olympic Games: SF – 4th (1912)

Doubles

Grand Slam doubles results
- Wimbledon: 3R (1926)

Other doubles tournaments
- Olympic Games: SF – 4th (1912)

Mixed doubles

Grand Slam mixed doubles results
- Wimbledon: 2R (1926)
Medal record
Representing Czechoslovakia
Olympic Games
Bronze medal – third place	1920 Antwerp	Mixed doubles

Ladislav Žemla (6 November 1887 – 18 June 1955) was a Czech tennis player. He competed for Bohemia at the 1906, 1908 and 1912 Summer Olympics and for Czechoslovakia at the 1920 and 1924 Summer Olympics. At the 1920 Olympics, he won a bronze medal in the mixed doubles event, together with his wife Milada Skrbková. He also won a bronze medal at the 1906 Intercalated Games, playing with his brother Zdeněk Žemla.

Between 1921 and 1927 he was a member of the Czechoslovakian Davis Cup team.
