= Margareta Lindberg =

Swedish tennis player

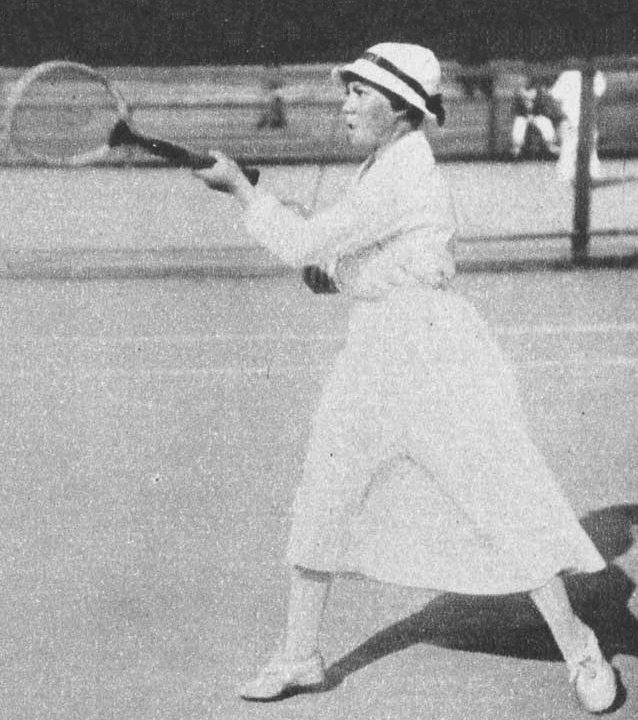
- Born: 31 May 1889 Stockholm, Sweden
- Died: 21 May 1984 (aged 94) Lidingö, Stockholm, Sweden

Jenny Emilie Greta "Margareta" Lindberg (31 May 1889 – 6 May 1974) was a Swedish tennis player. She competed in singles at the 1920 Summer Olympics and finished in 15th place.
