= Blanche Amblard =

French tennis player

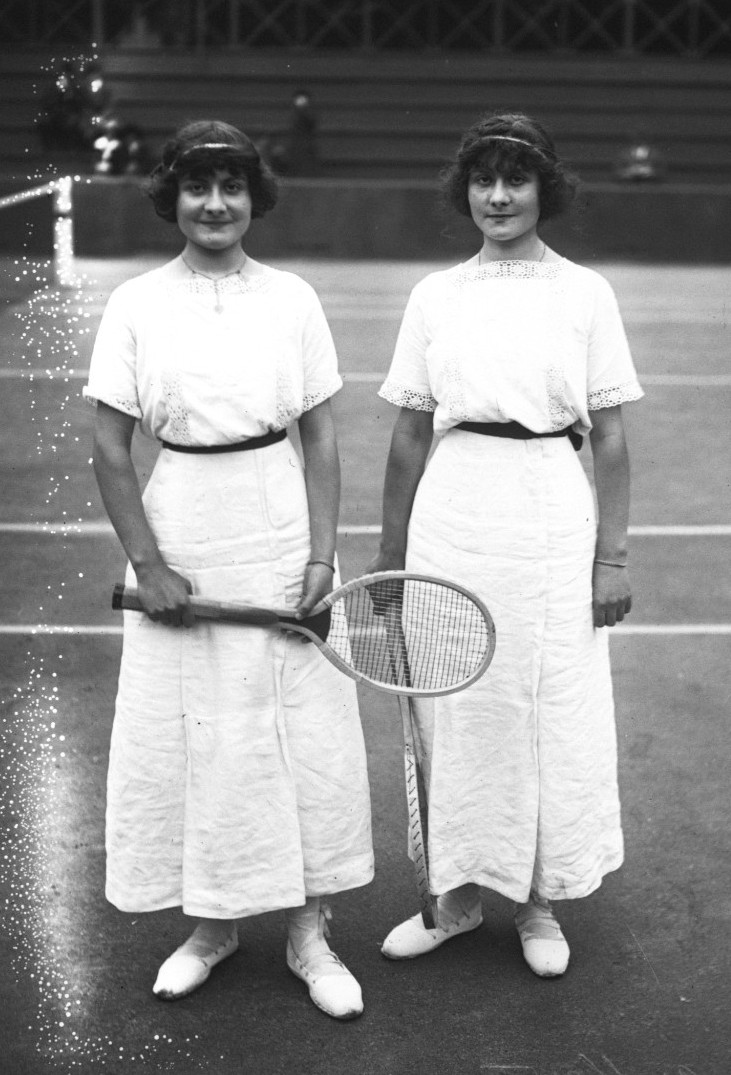
- Amblard sisters in 1914
- Full name: Blanche Mathilde Amblard
- Country (sports): France
- Born: 9 September 1896 Ville d’Avray, France
- Died: August 25, 1974 (aged 77) La Celle-Saint-Cloud, France

Other tournaments
- WHCC: SF (1913)

Grand Slam doubles results
- French Open: W (1913, 1914)

Other doubles tournaments
- WHCC: F (1914)

Blanche Mathilde Amblard (9 September 1896 – 25 August 1974) was a French tennis player. Amblard regularly played doubles with her twin sister Suzanne. They won the French Championships in back-to-back years in 1913 and 1914. They also finished runner-up at the World Hard Court Championships in 1914 to Suzanne Lenglen and Elizabeth Ryan. In singles, Amblard reached the semifinals of the World Hard Court Championships in 1913. She was ranked as the seventh best French women's tennis player in 1921, while her sister was fourth.
