= Élisabeth d'Ayen =

French tennis player (1898–1969)

- Full name: Élisabeth d'Ayen Macready
- Country (sports): France
- Born: 27 October 1898; Maintenon, Eure-et-Loir, France
- Died: 7 December 1969 (aged 71); Paris, France

Singles

Grand Slam singles results
- French Open: 3R (1925)
- Wimbledon: 3R (1923)

Other tournaments
- Olympic Games: Bronze Medal (1920)

Doubles

Grand Slam doubles results
- Wimbledon: QF (1925)

Grand Slam mixed doubles results
- Wimbledon: QF (1923)

Medal record

Women's tennis

Representing France

Olympic Games
Bronze medal – third place	1920 Antwerp	Doubles

Élisabeth d'Ayen Macready (French pronunciation: [elizabɛt dajɛ̃]; 27 October 1898 – 7 December 1969) was a French tennis player who competed in the Olympic Games in 1920. She won the bronze medal, along with Suzanne Lenglen, in the women's doubles competition in Antwerp. At the Grand Slam tournaments Macready reached the third round at the Wimbledon Championships (1923) and the French Championships (1925).
