= Milada Skrbková =

Czech tennis player

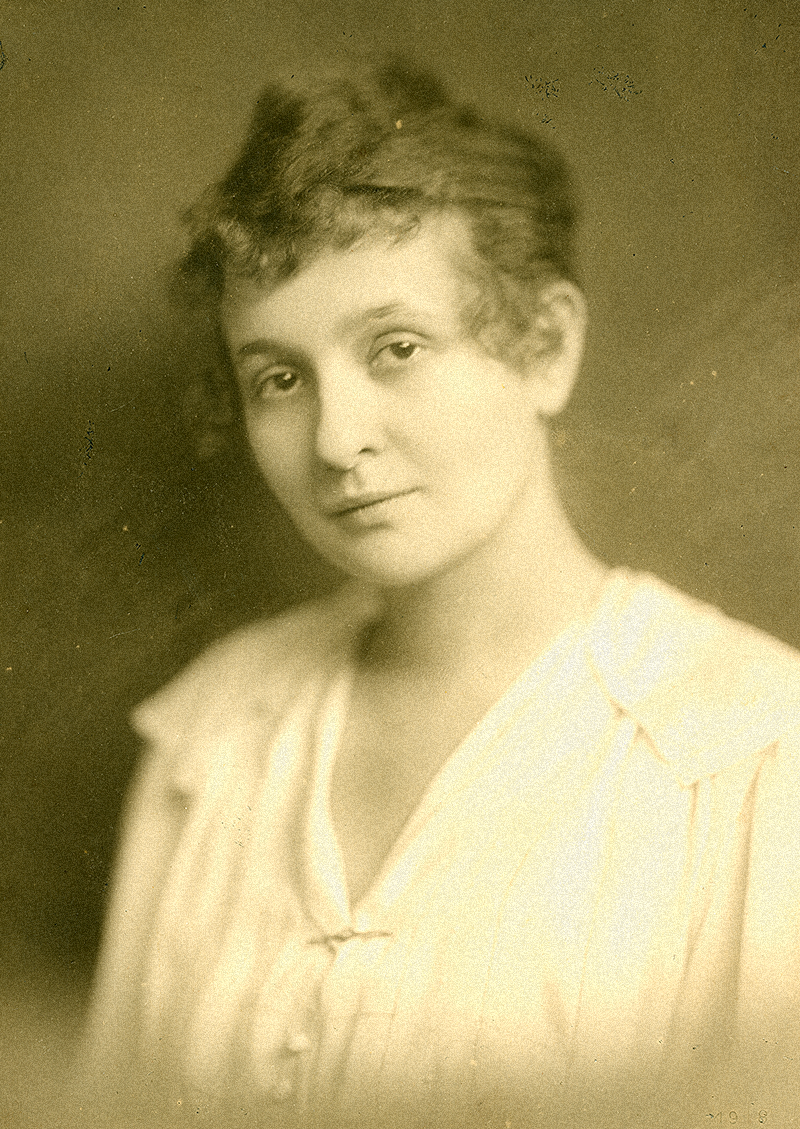
- Born: 30 May 1897 Prague, Austria-Hungary
- Died: 2 October 1935 (aged 38) Prague, Czechoslovakia
Medal record
Representing Czechoslovakia
Olympic Games
Bronze medal – third place	1920 Antwerp	Mixed doubles

Milada Skrbková (later Žemlová; 30 May 1897 – 2 October 1935) was a Czech tennis player. At the 1920 Olympics she won a bronze medal in the mixed doubles, playing with her future husband Ladislav Žemla. She was the first woman to represent Czechoslovakia at the Olympics.
