= Caro Dahl =

Norwegian tennis player

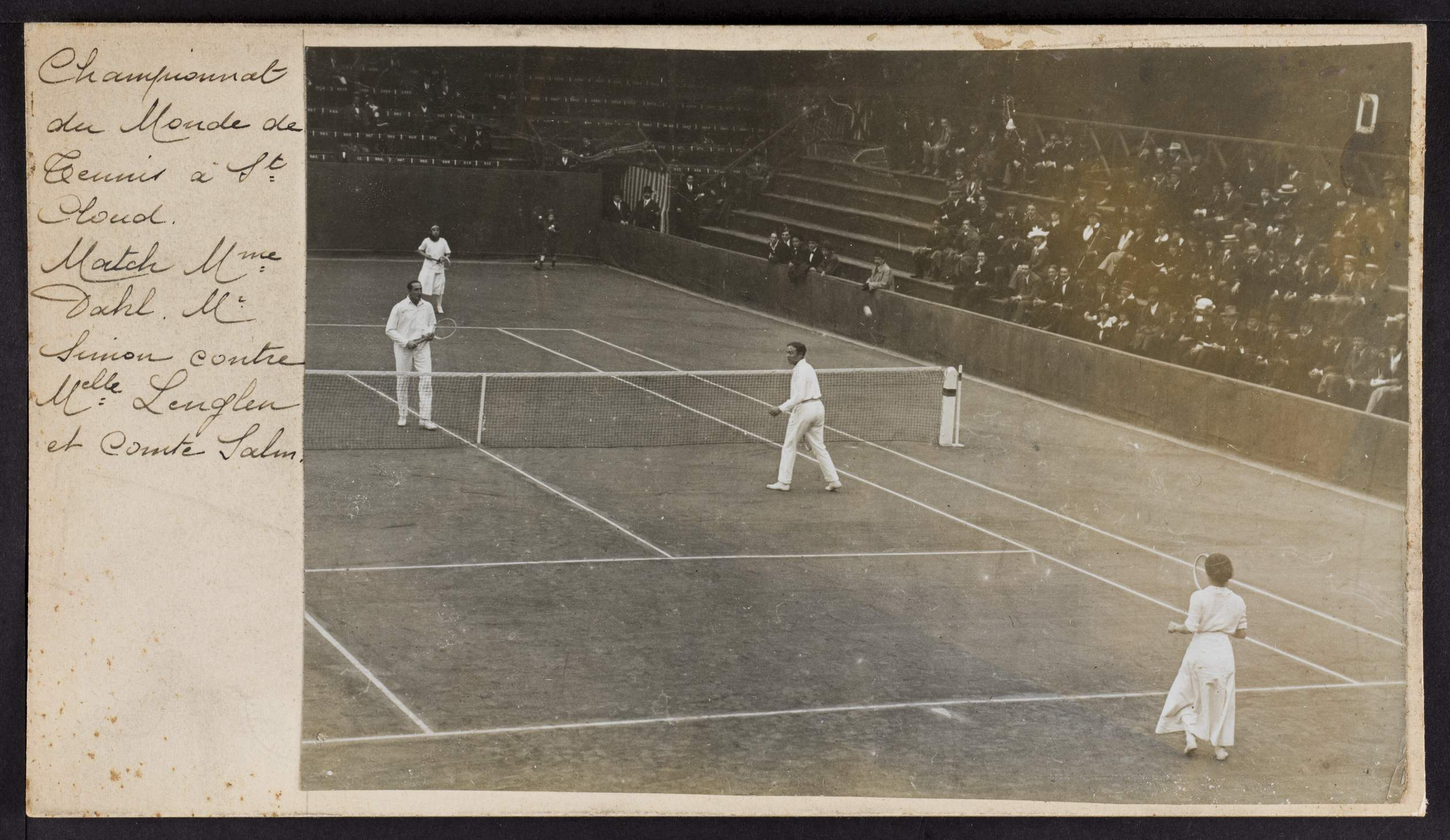
- Postcard photograph depicting a game of Caro Dahl's

Personal information
- Full name: Caroline Lucia Maria (Caro) Dahl
- Nationality: Norwegian
- Born: 17 October 1890 Istanbul, Turkey
- Died: 21 January 1979 (aged 88) Norway

Sport
- Sport: Tennis
- Club: Oslo Tennisklubb

Caroline Lucia Maria (Caro) Dahl (née Peter; 17 October 1890 – 21 January 1979) was a Norwegian tennis player, born in Istanbul.

== Career ==
Dahl competed in women's singles at the 1920 Summer Olympics in Antwerp, where she tied 9th. At the 1924 Summer Olympics in Paris, she competed in both women's singles and mixed doubles (with Conrad Langaard).

She won national titles in tennis (outdoor single) in 1919, 1920, 1923, 1924 and 1925. These five titles each earned her a Kongepokal (King’s Cup).

== Personal life ==
Dahl was born in Istanbul, the daughter of Silvie Pessi (1863–1939) and businessman Joachim Peter (died 1891). As her father died the year after her birth, the family eventually left Istanbul and Dahl grew up in Zürich. In 1913 she married Knud Dahl, who graduated as engineer in Zürich the same year. From 1915 to 1917 she lived with her husband in the United States, and thereafter in Oslo. She died in Oslo on 21 January 1979.
