= Lily Strömberg-von Essen =

Swedish tennis player

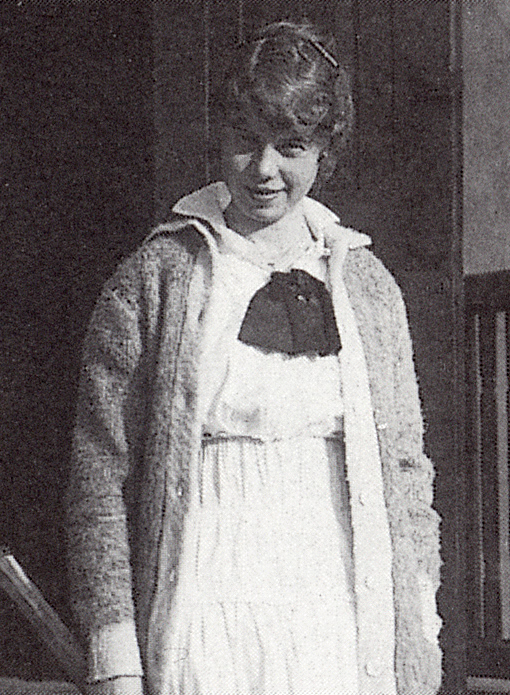
- Born: 24 September 1896 Lund, Sweden
- Died: 21 May 1990 (aged 93) Stockholm, Sweden

Lily Elisabeth Strömberg-von Essen (24 September 1896 – 21 May 1990) was a Swedish tennis player. She competed at the 1920 and 1924 Summer Olympics and finished fifth in four of her six events, which included women's singles and women's and mixed doubles.
