= Marthe Dupont =

Belgian tennis player

- Full name: Marthe Dupont-Trasenster
- Country (sports): Belgium
- Born: 30 March 1892 Ougrée, Belgium
- Died: 15 November 1979 (aged 87) Liège, Belgium

Marthe Dupont-Trasenster (née Trasenster; 30 March 1892 – 15 November 1979) was a Belgian tennis player.

== Career ==
She represented Belgium in the 1920 Summer Olympics and in the 1924 Summer Olympics. She was also a Belgian national tennis champion in 1921 and 1930.

== Personal life ==
In 1911, Marthe married a Belgian sport shooter, Émile Dupont who won a silver medal in the 1920 Summer Olympics and also participated in the 1924 Summer Olympics representing Belgium.

Her cousin, Marguerite Chaudoir, was also a Belgian tennis player.
