= Marie Storms =

Belgian tennis player (1885–1901)

- Country (sports): Belgium
- Born: 19 December 1885 Merbes-le-Château, Belgium
- Died: 14 June 1962 (aged 76)

Other tournaments
- WHCC: 3R (1923)

Marie Pauline Julia Storms (née Puissant; 19 December 1885 – 14 June 1962) was a Belgian tennis player. She competed at the 1920 Summer Olympics and the 1924 Summer Olympics. She was the wife of Belgian sports shooter Réginald Storms.
