= 1932 Wimbledon Championships – Women's doubles =

Women's doubles
- 1932 Wimbledon Championships

Final
- Champions: (France) Doris Metaxa (Belgium) Josane Sigart
- Runners-up: (United States) Helen Jacobs (United States) Elizabeth Ryan
- Score: 6–4, 6–3

Details
- Draw: 48 (5Q)
- Seeds: 4

Events
Singles	men	women		boys	girls
Doubles	men	women	mixed	boys	girls
- Wimbledon Championships

Phyllis King and Dorothy Shepherd-Barron were the defending champions, but lost in the quarterfinals to Lolette Payot and Muriel Thomas.

Doris Metaxa and Josane Sigart defeated Helen Jacobs and Elizabeth Ryan in the final, 6–4, 6–3 to win the ladies' doubles tennis title at the 1932 Wimbledon Championships.

== Seeds ==
1. (United Kingdom) Eileen Fearnley-Whittingstall / (United States) Betty Nuthall (third round)
2. (United States) Helen Jacobs / (United States) Elizabeth Ryan (final)
3. (United Kingdom) Phyllis King / (United Kingdom) Dorothy Shepherd-Barron (quarterfinals)
4. (France) Doris Metaxa / (Belgium) Josane Sigart (champions)

Click on the seed number of a player to go to their draw section.

== Draw ==
Key

- Q = Qualifier
- WC = Wild card
- LL = Lucky loser
- Alt = Alternate
- ITF = ITF entry
- PR = Protected ranking
- SR = Special ranking
- SE = Special exempt
- JE = Junior exempt
- JR = Junior Accelerator Programme entrant
- CO = College Accelerator Programme entrant
- NG = Next Gen Accelerator Program entrant
- w/o = Walkover
- r = Retired
- d = Defaulted

=== Finals ===
Quarterfinals
2	(United States) Helen Jacobs (United States) Elizabeth Ryan	6	4	6
(United Kingdom) Naomi Trentham (United Kingdom) Helen Turnbull	1	6	1
3	(United Kingdom) Phyllis King (United Kingdom) Dorothy Shepherd-Barron	6	5	4
(Switzerland) Lolette Payot (United Kingdom) Muriel Thomas	3	7	6
(United Kingdom) Phyllis Covell (United Kingdom) Billie Yorke	0	3
4	(France) Doris Metaxa (Belgium) Josane Sigart	6	6
(United Kingdom) Elsie Pittman (United Kingdom) Joan Ridley	4	6	6
(United Kingdom) Ermyntrude Harvey (United Kingdom) Phoebe Watson	6	2	8

Semifinals
2	(United States) Helen Jacobs (United States) Elizabeth Ryan	6	6
(Switzerland) Lolette Payot (United Kingdom) Muriel Thomas	1	2
4	(France) Doris Metaxa (Belgium) Josane Sigart	7	6
(United Kingdom) Ermyntrude Harvey (United Kingdom) Phoebe Watson	5	2

Final
2	(United States) Helen Jacobs (United States) Elizabeth Ryan	4	3
4	(France) Doris Metaxa (Belgium) Josane Sigart	6	6

=== Top half ===
==== Section 1 ====
First round

Second round
2	(United States) Helen Jacobs (United States) Elizabeth Ryan	6	6
(United Kingdom) Agnes Tuckey (United Kingdom) Christabel Wheatcroft	1	2
Q	(United Kingdom) Ruth Kirk (United Kingdom) M Wynne	6	6
(United Kingdom) Joan Lycett (South Africa) Irene Peacock	3	2
(Germany) Cilly Aussem (United Kingdom) Phyllis Satterthwaite	w/o
(United Kingdom) Mrs Bruce-May (United Kingdom) Madge List
Q	(United Kingdom) Doreen Busby; Mrs G Hawkins	7	2
(United Kingdom) Naomi Trentham (United Kingdom) Helen Turnbull	9	6

Third round
2	(United States) H Jacobs (United States) E Ryan	6	7
Q	(United Kingdom) R Kirk (United Kingdom) M Wynne	2	5
(United Kingdom) Mrs Bruce-May (United Kingdom) M List	5	3
(United Kingdom) N Trentham (United Kingdom) H Turnbull	7	6

Quarterfinals
2	(United States) H Jacobs (United States) E Ryan	6	4	6
(United Kingdom) N Trentham (United Kingdom) H Turnbull	1	6	1

The nationality of Mrs G Hawkins is unknown.

==== Section 2 ====
First round
3	(United Kingdom) Phyllis King (United Kingdom) Dorothy Shepherd-Barron	6	6
(United Kingdom) Elsa Haylock (Poland) Jadwiga Jędrzejowska	2	4
(United Kingdom) Beatrice Feltham (United Kingdom) Freda Scott	6	6
(Netherlands) Els Belzer (Netherlands) Madzy Couquerque	0	4
(United Kingdom) Winifred Beamish (United Kingdom) Margaret Mellows	7	6
Q	(United Kingdom) Mary Knapp (United Kingdom) Daphne White	5	2
(France) Jacqueline Goldschmidt (Spain) Bella Pons	5	6	6
(United Kingdom) Dorothy Anderson (United Kingdom) Jeanette Morfey	7	4	2
(United Kingdom) Enid Clarke (United Kingdom) Violet Owen	1	3
(United Kingdom) Kitty Godfree (United Kingdom) Gwen Sterry	6	6
(France) Simonne Mathieu (France) Colette Rosambert	0	6	6
(United Kingdom) Enid Broadbridge (United Kingdom) Davinia Townsend	6	4	2
(United Kingdom) Joan Ingram (United Kingdom) Peggy Pleydell-Bouverie	2	3
(Switzerland) Lolette Payot (United Kingdom) MA Thomas	6	6
(United Kingdom) Betty Soames (United Kingdom) Olga Webb	4	3
(United Kingdom) Sheila Hewitt (United Kingdom) Kay Stammers	6	6

Second round
3	(United Kingdom) P King (United Kingdom) D Shepherd-Barron	6	6
(United Kingdom) B Feltham (United Kingdom) F Scott	4	2
(United Kingdom) W Beamish (United Kingdom) M Mellows	6	6
(France) J Goldschmidt (Spain) B Pons	3	2
(United Kingdom) K Godfree (United Kingdom) G Sterry	6	10	2
(France) S Mathieu (France) C Rosambert	2	12	6
(Switzerland) L Payot (United Kingdom) MA Thomas	6	9
(United Kingdom) S Hewitt (United Kingdom) K Stammers	4	7

Third round
3	(United Kingdom) P King (United Kingdom) D Shepherd-Barron	10	6
(United Kingdom) W Beamish (United Kingdom) M Mellows	8	2
(France) S Mathieu (France) C Rosambert	4	6	2
(Switzerland) L Payot (United Kingdom) MA Thomas	6	4	6

Quarterfinals
3	(United Kingdom) P King (United Kingdom) D Shepherd-Barron	6	5	4
(Switzerland) L Payot (United Kingdom) MA Thomas	3	7	6

=== Bottom half ===
==== Section 3 ====
First round
(South Africa) Mrs WG Lowe (United Kingdom) Mildred Nonweiler	5	1
(United Kingdom) Cecily Marriott (United Kingdom) Madge Slaney	7	6
(United Kingdom) NQ Radcliffe-Platt (United Kingdom) PM Radcliffe	7	5	0
(United Kingdom) Betty Dix (United Kingdom) Effie Peters	5	7	6
(United Kingdom) Joy Cunningham (United Kingdom) Susan Noel	7	2	3
(United Kingdom) Sybil Edwards (United Kingdom) Dorothy Jameson	5	6	6
(France) Elizabeth Macready (United Kingdom) Vera Montgomery	1	4
(United Kingdom) Phyllis Covell (United Kingdom) Billie Yorke	6	6
Q	(United Kingdom) Mie Johnstone (United Kingdom) Lucy Pennycuick	7	6
(United Kingdom) Gethyn Harry (United Kingdom) JF Harry	5	3
(United Kingdom) Peggy Michell (United Kingdom) Dorothy Round	6	6
(United Kingdom) Doris Eastley (United Kingdom) Andree Lucas	4	4
(United Kingdom) Evelyn Dearman (United Kingdom) Nancy Lyle	6	2	6
(Germany) Marie Horn (Germany) Hilde Krahwinkel	2	6	3
(United Kingdom) Mary Heeley (United Kingdom) Freda James	6	4	5
4	(France) Doris Metaxa (Belgium) Josane Sigart	2	6	7

Second round
(United Kingdom) C Marriott (United Kingdom) M Slaney	3	6	4
(United Kingdom) B Dix (United Kingdom) E Peters	6	2	6
(United Kingdom) S Edwards (United Kingdom) D Jameson	4	6	5
(United Kingdom) P Covell (United Kingdom) A Yorke	6	4	7
Q	(United Kingdom) M Johnstone (United Kingdom) L Pennycuick	4	2
(United Kingdom) M Michell (United Kingdom) D Round	6	6
(United Kingdom) E Dearman (United Kingdom) N Lyle	3	2
4	(France) D Metaxa (Belgium) J Sigart	6	6

Third round
(United Kingdom) B Dix (United Kingdom) E Peters	3	6	4
(United Kingdom) P Covell (United Kingdom) A Yorke	6	3	6
(United Kingdom) M Michell (United Kingdom) D Round	4	8	2
4	(France) D Metaxa (Belgium) J Sigart	6	6	6

Quarterfinals
(United Kingdom) P Covell (United Kingdom) A Yorke	0	3
4	(France) D Metaxa (Belgium) J Sigart	6	6

==== Section 4 ====
First round

Second round
(United States) Anna Harper (United States) Sarah Palfrey	6	6
(United Kingdom) Sybil Edwards (United Kingdom) Marjorie Stork	4	2
(United Kingdom) Elsie Pittman (United Kingdom) Joan Ridley	3	6	6
(United States) Dorothy Burke (Italy) Lucia Valerio	6	3	1
(United Kingdom) Ermyntrude Harvey (United Kingdom) Phoebe Watson	6	6
Q	Mrs HW Backhouse; L Philip	1	1
(United Kingdom) Helen Burr (United Kingdom) Helen Dyson	1	3
1	(United Kingdom) Eileen Fearnley-Whittingstall (United Kingdom) Betty Nuthall	6	6

Third round
(United States) A Harper (United States) S Palfrey	4	2
(United Kingdom) E Pittman (United Kingdom) J Ridley	6	6
(United Kingdom) E Harvey (United Kingdom) P Watson	12	6
1	(United Kingdom) E Fearnley-Whittingstall (United Kingdom) B Nuthall	10	1

Quarterfinals
(United Kingdom) E Pittman (United Kingdom) J Ridley	4	6	6
(United Kingdom) E Harvey (United Kingdom) P Watson	6	2	8

The nationalities of Mrs HW Backhouse and L Philip are unknown.
