= 1924 Wimbledon Championships – Women's doubles =

Women's doubles
- 1924 Wimbledon Championships

Final
- Champions: (United States) Hazel Wightman (United States) Helen Wills
- Runners-up: (United Kingdom) Phyllis Covell (United Kingdom) Kitty McKane
- Score: 6–4, 6–4

Details
- Draw: 40
- Seeds: –

Events
Singles	men	women		boys	girls
Doubles	men	women	mixed	boys	girls
← 1923 ·	Wimbledon Championships	· 1925 →

Suzanne Lenglen and Elizabeth Ryan were the defending champions, but Lenglen was forced to withdraw from their quarterfinal match due to health problems.

Hazel Wightman and Helen Wills defeated Phyllis Covell and Kitty McKane in the final, 6–4, 6–4 to win the ladies' doubles tennis title at the 1924 Wimbledon Championships.

== Draw ==
=== Key ===
- Q = Qualifier
- WC = Wild card
- LL = Lucky loser
- Alt = Alternate
- SE = Special exempt
- PR = Protected ranking
- ITF = ITF entry
- JE = Junior exempt
- w/o = Walkover
- r = Retired
- d = Defaulted
- SR = Special ranking

=== Finals ===
Quarterfinals
(United Kingdom) Sylvia Lumley-Ellis (United Kingdom) Agnes Tuckey	3	6
(United Kingdom) Dorothea Lambert Chambers (United Kingdom) Dorothy Shepherd-Barron	6	8
(United Kingdom) Phyllis Covell (United Kingdom) Kitty McKane	7	6
(United Kingdom) Winifred Beamish (United Kingdom) Marie Hazel	5	1
(United Kingdom) Dorothy Hill (United Kingdom) Peggy Pleydell-Bouverie	2	6	7
(United States) Eleanor Goss (United States) Marion Jessup	6	2	9
(France) Suzanne Lenglen (United States) Elizabeth Ryan	w/o
(United States) Hazel Wightman (United States) Helen Wills

Semifinals
(United Kingdom) Dorothea Lambert Chambers (United Kingdom) Dorothy Shepherd-Barron	4	6	4
(United Kingdom) Phyllis Covell (United Kingdom) Kitty McKane	6	3	6
(United States) Eleanor Goss (United States) Marion Jessup	6	4
(United States) Hazel Wightman (United States) Helen Wills	8	6

Final
(United Kingdom) Phyllis Covell (United Kingdom) Kitty McKane	4	4
(United States) Hazel Wightman (United States) Helen Wills	6	6

=== Top half ===
==== Section 1 ====
First round

Second round
(United Kingdom) Phoebe Holcroft (United Kingdom) Naomi Jackson-Fielden	4	1
(United Kingdom) Mildred Coles (United Kingdom) Joan Ridley	6	6
(United Kingdom) Sylvia Lumley-Ellis (United Kingdom) Agnes Tuckey	6	8
(United Kingdom) Claire Beckingham (United Kingdom) EM Beckingham	3	6
(India) M Hasler (United Kingdom) Mrs J O'Neill	6	0	4
(United Kingdom) Irene Maltby (United Kingdom) Eleanor Rose	3	6	6
(United Kingdom) Mrs Saunders-Taylor (United States) Eleonora Sears	1	0
(United Kingdom) Dorothea Lambert Chambers (United Kingdom) Dorothy Shepherd-Barron	6	6

Third round
(United Kingdom) M Coles (United Kingdom) J Ridley	2	4
(United Kingdom) S Lumley-Ellis (United Kingdom) A Tuckey	6	6
(United Kingdom) I Maltby (United Kingdom) E Rose	2	4
(United Kingdom) D Lambert Chambers (United Kingdom) D Shepherd-Barron	6	6

Quarterfinals
(United Kingdom) S Lumley-Ellis (United Kingdom) A Tuckey	3	6
(United Kingdom) D Lambert Chambers (United Kingdom) D Shepherd-Barron	6	8

==== Section 2 ====
First round
(United Kingdom) Joan Barrett (United Kingdom) Joyce Brown	6	2	2
(United Kingdom) Mrs Bruce-May; Mrs van Praagh	3	6	6
(United Kingdom) Winifred Beamish (United Kingdom) Marie Hazel
(United Kingdom) HL Eddis; Mrs Gregson	w/o
(United Kingdom) Mrs E Bousfield (United Kingdom) CI Kalber	6	1	4
(United Kingdom) Mrs WL Hollick (United Kingdom) Cecily Marriott	1	6	6
(United Kingdom) KM Marriott (United Kingdom) OM Walker	3	6	2
(United Kingdom) Peggy Dransfield (United Kingdom) Hazel Hogarth	6	2	6

Second round
(United States) Lilian Scharman (United States) Edith Sigourney	3	1
(Netherlands) Kea Bouman (France) Elizabeth Macready	6	6
(United Kingdom) Kathleen Lidderdale (United Kingdom) Mary McIlquham	4	2
(United Kingdom) Phyllis Covell (United Kingdom) Kitty McKane	6	6
(United Kingdom) Mrs Bruce-May; Mrs van Praagh	0	2
(United Kingdom) W Beamish (United Kingdom) M Hazel	6	6
(United Kingdom) Mrs WL Hollick (United Kingdom) C Marriott	3	1
(United Kingdom) P Dransfield (United Kingdom) H Hogarth	6	6

Third round
(Netherlands) K Bouman (France) E Macready	3	3
(United Kingdom) P Covell (United Kingdom) K McKane	6	6
(United Kingdom) W Beamish (United Kingdom) M Hazel	6	6
(United Kingdom) P Dransfield (United Kingdom) H Hogarth	3	1

Quarterfinals
(United Kingdom) P Covell (United Kingdom) K McKane	7	6
(United Kingdom) W Beamish (United Kingdom) M Hazel	5	1

The nationalities of Mrs van Praagh and Mrs Gregson are unknown.

=== Bottom half ===
==== Section 3 ====
First round
(United Kingdom) NQ Radcliffe-Platt (United Kingdom) PM Radcliffe	4	6	4
(United Kingdom) Mrs IFL Elliot (Republic of Ireland) Hilda Wallis	6	1	6
(Republic of Ireland) WM Haughton (Republic of Ireland) Mrs RRW Jackson	6	4	3
(United Kingdom) Dorothy Hill (United Kingdom) Peggy Pleydell-Bouverie	4	6	6
(United Kingdom) Ariadne Rodocanachi (United Kingdom) MK Taylor	4	8	4
(United Kingdom) Joy Coote (United Kingdom) Mrs HV Parbury	6	6	6
(United Kingdom) Winifred McNair (United Kingdom) R Watson	6	7
(United Kingdom) Mary Burgess-Smith (United Kingdom) Mrs MB Reckitt	2	5

Second round
(United Kingdom) Mrs IFL Elliot (Republic of Ireland) H Wallis	6	4	2
(United Kingdom) D Hill (United Kingdom) M Pleydell-Bouverie	4	6	6
(United Kingdom) J Coote (United Kingdom) Mrs HV Parbury	6	3	3
(United Kingdom) W McNair (United Kingdom) R Watson	4	6	6
(United Kingdom) Ermyntrude Harvey (United Kingdom) Phyllis Satterthwaite	6	6
(United Kingdom) Norah Middleton (United Kingdom) Molly Welsh	0	3
(United Kingdom) JL Colegate (United Kingdom) CJ Tyrrell	4	3
(United States) Eleanor Goss (United States) Marion Jessup	6	6

Third round
(United Kingdom) D Hill (United Kingdom) M Pleydell-Bouverie	6	9
(United Kingdom) W McNair (United Kingdom) R Watson	3	7
(United Kingdom) E Harvey (United Kingdom) P Satterthwaite	7	10
(United States) E Goss (United States) M Jessup	9	12

Quarterfinals
(United Kingdom) D Hill (United Kingdom) M Pleydell-Bouverie	2	6	7
(United States) E Goss (United States) M Jessup	6	2	9

==== Section 4 ====
First round

Second round
(United Kingdom) Joan Reid-Thomas (United Kingdom) Mrs HB Weston	6	7
Mrs BL Bisgood (United Kingdom) Mrs AK Guyer	1	5
(United Kingdom) Enid Clarke (United Kingdom) Enid Head	0	3
(France) Suzanne Lenglen (United States) Elizabeth Ryan	6	6
(United Kingdom) Violet Pinckney (United Kingdom) Hilary Stebbing	1	2
(United Kingdom) Joan Austin (United Kingdom) Evelyn Colyer	6	6
(United Kingdom) Doris Craddock (United Kingdom) Mabel Parton	4	0
(United States) Hazel Wightman (United States) Helen Wills	6	6

Third round
(United Kingdom) J Reid-Thomas (United Kingdom) Mrs HB Weston	3	1
(France) S Lenglen (United States) E Ryan	6	6
(United Kingdom) J Austin (United Kingdom) E Colyer	2	4
(United States) H Wightman (United States) H Wills	6	6

Quarterfinals
(France) S Lenglen (United States) E Ryan	w/o
(United States) H Wightman (United States) H Wills

The nationality of Mrs BL Bisgood is unknown.
