= 1924 Wimbledon Championships – Women's singles =

Women's singles
- 1924 Wimbledon Championships

Final
- Champion: (United Kingdom) Kitty McKane
- Runner-up: (United States) Helen Wills
- Score: 4–6, 6–4, 6–4

Details
- Draw: 64
- Seeds: –

Events
Singles	men	women		boys	girls
Doubles	men	women	mixed	boys	girls
← 1923 ·	Wimbledon Championships	· 1925 →

Kitty McKane defeated Helen Wills 4–6, 6–4, 6–4 in the final to win the ladies' singles tennis title at the 1924 Wimbledon Championships.

Suzanne Lenglen was the five-time defending champion, but withdrew from her semifinal match against Kitty McKane due to health problems.

== Draw ==
=== Key ===
- Q = Qualifier
- WC = Wild card
- LL = Lucky loser
- Alt = Alternate
- SE = Special exempt
- PR = Protected ranking
- ITF = ITF entry
- JE = Junior exempt
- w/o = Walkover
- r = Retired
- d = Defaulted
- SR = Special ranking

=== Finals ===
Quarterfinals
(United Kingdom) Dorothy Shepherd-Barron	4	8
(United Kingdom) Phyllis Satterthwaite	6	10
(United States) Helen Wills	6	6
(United Kingdom) Jessie Colegate	1	0
(United States) Marion Jessup	1	3
(United Kingdom) Kitty McKane	6	6
(France) Suzanne Lenglen	6	6	6
(United States) Elizabeth Ryan	2	8	4

Semifinals
(United Kingdom) Phyllis Satterthwaite	2	1
(United States) Helen Wills	6	6
(United Kingdom) Kitty McKane
(France) Suzanne Lenglen	w/o

Final
(United States) Helen Wills	6	4	4
(United Kingdom) Kitty McKane	4	6	6

=== Top half ===
==== Section 1 ====
First round
(United Kingdom) R Watson	1	6	1
(United Kingdom) Marie Hazel	6	4	6
(United Kingdom) Eleanor Rose	6	6
(Bermuda) Gladys Hutchings	3	0
(United Kingdom) Dorothy Hill	6	0
(United Kingdom) Dorothy Shepherd-Barron	8	6
(United States) Edith Sigourney	6	2	6
(Republic of Ireland) Hilda Wallis	3	6	8
(United States) Eleanor Goss	4	4
(United Kingdom) Phyllis Satterthwaite	6	6
(United Kingdom) CJ Tyrrell	6	6
(United Kingdom) Joy Coote	2	3
(United Kingdom) Kathleen Lidderdale	2	6	0
(United Kingdom) Agnes Tuckey	6	4	0^{r}
(United Kingdom) Joan Ridley	4	3
(United Kingdom) Doris Craddock	6	6

Second round
(United Kingdom) M Hazel	1	1
(United Kingdom) E Rose	6	6
(United Kingdom) D Shepherd-Barron	6	6
(Republic of Ireland) H Wallis	0	1
(United Kingdom) P Satterthwaite	6	6
(United Kingdom) CJ Tyrrell	1	4
(United Kingdom) K Lidderdale	1	3
(United Kingdom) D Craddock	6	6

Third round
(United Kingdom) E Rose	2	4
(United Kingdom) D Shepherd-Barron	6	6
(United Kingdom) P Satterthwaite	6	6
(United Kingdom) D Craddock	1	1

Quarterfinals
(United Kingdom) D Shepherd-Barron	4	8
(United Kingdom) P Satterthwaite	6	10

==== Section 2 ====
First round
(United States) Helen Wills	6	6
(United States) Lilian Scharman	1	0
(United Kingdom) Louise Bull	6	1	4
(United Kingdom) Peggy Dransfield	4	6	6
(United Kingdom) HL Eddis	6	6
(United Kingdom) Mary McIlquham	1	2
(United Kingdom) Naomi Jackson-Fielden	3	1
(United Kingdom) Aurea Edgington	6	6
(United Kingdom) Mrs HB Weston	4	3
(United Kingdom) JL Colegate	6	6
(United Kingdom) Ariadne Rodocanachi
(United Kingdom) CJ Walters	w/o
(United Kingdom) Evelyn Colyer	8	6
(France) Elizabeth Macready	6	1
(United Kingdom) Norah Middleton	0	0
(United Kingdom) Winifred Beamish	6	6

Second round
(United States) H Wills	6	6
(United Kingdom) P Dransfield	0	2
(United Kingdom) M McIlquham	8	3	5
(United Kingdom) A Edgington	6	6	7
(United Kingdom) JL Colegate	6	6
(United Kingdom) A Rodocanachi	0	0
(United Kingdom) E Colyer	6	6
(United Kingdom) W Beamish	3	4

Third round
(United States) H Wills	6	6
(United Kingdom) A Edgington	2	2
(United Kingdom) JL Colegate	6	6
(United Kingdom) E Colyer	3	3

Quarterfinals
(United States) H Wills	6	6
(United Kingdom) JL Colegate	1	0

=== Bottom half ===
==== Section 3 ====
First round
(United States) Marion Jessup	6	6
(India) M Hasler	1	2
(United Kingdom) Mrs LC Pitman	1	3
(United Kingdom) Joan Barrett	6	6
(United Kingdom) MK Taylor	4	3
(United Kingdom) Phoebe Holcroft	6	6
(United Kingdom) Joan Austin	6	3	2
(Republic of Ireland) WM Haughton	2	6	6
(United Kingdom) Kitty McKane	6	4	6
(United Kingdom) Blanche Colston	4	6	1
(United States) Molla Mallory	7	6
(United Kingdom) Ermyntrude Harvey	5	3
(Switzerland) Mrs M Monk	1	4
(United Kingdom) Honor Woolrych	6	6
(United Kingdom) Mildred Coles	6	6
(United Kingdom) Molly Welsh	3	2

Second round
(United States) M Jessup	6	6
(United Kingdom) J Barrett	0	2
(United Kingdom) P Holcroft	6	9
(Republic of Ireland) WM Haughton	1	7
(United Kingdom) K McKane	6	6
(United States) M Mallory	1	0
(United Kingdom) H Woolrych	12	2	6
(United Kingdom) M Coles	10	6	3

Third round
(United States) M Jessup	6	6
(United Kingdom) P Holcroft	1	3
(United Kingdom) K McKane	4	6	6
(United Kingdom) H Woolrych	6	0	0

Quarterfinals
(United States) M Jessup	1	3
(United Kingdom) K McKane	6	6

==== Section 4 ====
First round
(United States) Eleanora Sears	1	2
(United Kingdom) Enid Clarke	6	6
(United Kingdom) Sylvia Lumley-Ellis	0	0
(France) Suzanne Lenglen	6	6
(United Kingdom) Winifred McNair	2	5
(United States) Hazel Wightman	6	7
(United Kingdom) Mrs Saunders-Taylor	6	6
(Canada) I Haselden	0	0
(United Kingdom) Phyllis Covell	4	6	6
(United Kingdom) Dorothy Holman	6	4	0
(United Kingdom) Joan Reid-Thomas	9	6
(United Kingdom) KM Marriott	7	4
(United Kingdom) Mabel Parton	6	2	8
(Netherlands) Kea Bouman	1	6	6
(United Kingdom) Peggy Pleydell-Bouverie	0	0
(United States) Elizabeth Ryan	6	6

Second round
(United Kingdom) E Clarke	0	0
(France) S Lenglen	6	6
(United States) H Wightman	6	6
(United Kingdom) Mrs J Saunders-Taylor	0	2
(United Kingdom) P Covell	6	6
(United Kingdom) J Reid-Thomas	1	1
(United Kingdom) M Parton	4	6
(United States) E Ryan	6	8

Third round
(France) S Lenglen	6	6
(United States) H Wightman	0	0
(United Kingdom) P Covell	4	5
(United States) E Ryan	6	7

Quarterfinals
(France) S Lenglen	6	6	6
(United States) E Ryan	2	8	4

Preceded by 1924 Australasian Championships – Women's singles	Grand Slam women's singles	Succeeded by 1924 U.S. National Championships – Women's singles
