= 1923 U.S. National Championships (tennis) =

- Date: September 10–15 (M); August 13–18 (W)
- Edition: 43rd
- Category: Grand Slam (ITF)
- Surface: Grass
- Location: Philadelphia, Pennsylvania (MS); Forest Hills, New York (WS, WD); Chestnut Hill, Massachusetts (MD, XD)
- Venue: Germantown Cricket Club (MS); West Side Tennis Club (WS, WD); Longwood Cricket Club (MD, XD)

Champions

Men's singles
- (United States) Bill Tilden

Women's singles
- (United States) Helen Wills Moody

Men's doubles
- (United States) Bill Tilden / (South Africa) Brian Norton

Women's doubles
- (United Kingdom) Kitty McKane / (United Kingdom) Phyllis Howkins Covell

Mixed doubles
- (United States) Molla Bjurstedt Mallory / (United States) Bill Tilden
- U.S. National Championships

The 1923 U.S. National Championships (now known as the US Open) was a tennis tournament that took place on the outdoor grass courts at the Germantown Cricket Club in Philadelphia, Pennsylvania, United States. The women's tournament was held from August 13 until August 18 while the men's tournament ran from September 10 until September 15. It was the 43rd staging of the U.S. National Championships and the third Grand Slam tennis event of the year.

== Finals ==
=== Men's singles ===
(United States) Bill Tilden defeated (United States) Bill Johnston 6–4, 6–1, 6–4

=== Women's singles ===
(United States) Helen Wills defeated (United States) Molla Mallory 6–2, 6–1

=== Men's doubles ===
(United States) Bill Tilden / (South Africa) Brian Norton defeated (United States) Richard Norris Williams / (United States) Watson Washburn 3–6, 6–2, 6–3, 5–7, 6–2

=== Women's doubles ===
(United Kingdom) Kitty McKane / (United Kingdom) Phyllis Howkins Covell defeated (United States) Hazel Hotchkiss Wightman / (United States) Eleanor Goss 2–6, 6–2, 6–1

=== Mixed doubles ===
(United States) Molla Mallory / (United States) Bill Tilden defeated (United Kingdom) Kitty McKane / (Australia) John Hawkes 6–3, 2–6, 10–8

Preceded by 1923 Australasian Championships	Grand Slams	Succeeded by 1924 Australasian Championships
