= 1925 U.S. National Championships – Women's singles =

Women's singles
- 1925 U.S. National Championships

Final
- Champion: (United States) Helen Wills
- Runner-up: (United Kingdom) Kathleen McKane Godfree
- Score: 3–6, 6–0, 6–2

Details
- Draw: 64

Events
| Singles | men | women |
| Doubles | men | women |
| ← 1924 · | U.S. National Championships | · 1926 → |

First-seeded Helen Wills defeated Kathleen McKane Godfree 3–6, 6–0, 6–2 in the final to win the women's singles tennis title at the 1925 U.S. National Championships. The event was held at the West Side Tennis Club, Forest Hills, New York City. It was Wills's third consecutive U.S. National singles title.

== Draw ==
=== Final eight ===
Quarterfinals
(United States) Elizabeth Ryan | 6 | 5 | 2
(United Kingdom) Kathleen McKane Godfree | 3 | 7 | 6
(United States) Molla Bjurstedt Mallory | 6 | 6
(United States) Penelope Anderson | 2 | 1
(United States) Helen Wills | 4 | 6 | 6
(United Kingdom) Joan Fry | 6 | 0 | 3
(United States) Eleanor Goss | 6 | 11
(United Kingdom) Dorothea Douglass Lambert Chambers | 2 | 9

Semifinals
(United Kingdom) Kathleen McKane Godfree | 4 | 7 | 8
(United States) Molla Bjurstedt Mallory | 6 | 5 | 6
(United States) Helen Wills | 3 | 6 | 6
(United States) Eleanor Goss | 6 | 0 | 2

Finals
(United Kingdom) Kathleen McKane Godfree | 6 | 0 | 2
(United States) Helen Wills | 3 | 6 | 6

| Preceded by 1925 Wimbledon Championships – Women's singles | Grand Slam women's singles | Succeeded by 1926 Australasian Championships – Women's singles |
