= 1925 U.S. National Championships (tennis) =

- Date: September 14–19 (M); August 17–24 (W)
- Edition: 45th
- Category: Grand Slam (ITF)
- Surface: Grass
- Location: Forest Hills, Queens; New York City, New York
- Venue: West Side Tennis Club

Champions

Men's singles
- (United States) Bill Tilden

Women's singles
- (United States) Helen Wills Moody

Men's doubles
- (United States) Richard Norris Williams / (United States) Vincent Richards

Women's doubles
- (United States) Mary Browne / (United States) Helen Wills

Mixed doubles
- (United Kingdom) Kitty McKane / (Australia) Jack Hawkes
← 1924 ·	U.S. National Championships	· 1926 →

The 1925 U.S. National Championships (now known as the US Open) was a tennis tournament that took place on the outdoor grass courts at the West Side Tennis Club, Forest Hills in New York City, New York. The women's tournament was held from August 17 until August 24 while the men's tournament ran from September 14 until September 19. It was the 45th staging of the U.S. National Championships and the fourth Grand Slam tennis event of the year.

== Champions ==
=== Men's singles ===
(United States) Bill Tilden defeated (United States) Bill Johnston 4–6, 11–9, 6–3, 4–6, 6–3

=== Women's singles ===
(United States) Helen Wills defeated (United Kingdom) Kitty McKane 3–6, 6–0, 6–2

=== Men's doubles ===
(United States) Richard Norris Williams / (United States) Vincent Richards defeated (Australia) Gerald Patterson / (Australia) Jack Hawkes 6–2, 8–10, 6–4, 11–9

=== Women's doubles ===
(United States) Mary Browne / (United States) Helen Wills defeated (United States) May Sutton Bundy / (United States) Elizabeth Ryan 6–4, 6–3

=== Mixed doubles ===
(United Kingdom) Kitty McKane / (Australia) Jack Hawkes defeated (United Kingdom) Ermyntrude Harvey / (United States) Vincent Richards 6–2, 6–4

Preceded by 1925 Wimbledon Championships	Grand Slams	Succeeded by 1926 Australasian Championships
