= 1932 French Championships – Women's singles =

Women's singles
- 1932 French Championships

Final
- Champion: (United States) Helen Wills Moody
- Runner-up: (France) Simonne Mathieu
- Score: 7–5, 6–1

Details
- Seeds: 8

Events
Singles	men	women
Doubles	men	women
← 1931 ·	French Championships	· 1933 →

Helen Wills Moody defeated Simonne Mathieu 7–5, 6–1 in the final to win the women's singles tennis title at the 1932 French Championships.

== Seeds ==
The seeded players are listed below. Helen Moody is the champion; others show the round in which they were eliminated.

1. (United States) Helen Moody (champion)
2. (Germany) Cilly Aussem (quarterfinals)
3. (France) Simonne Mathieu (finalist)
4. (Germany) Hilde Krahwinkel (semifinals)
5. (United Kingdom) Eileen Fearnley Whittingstall (quarterfinals)
6. (United States) Helen Jacobs (quarterfinals)
7. (United Kingdom) Betty Nuthall (semifinals)
8. (Spain) Lilly De Alvarez (third round)

== Draw ==
=== Key ===
- Q = Qualifier
- WC = Wild card
- LL = Lucky loser
- r = Retired

=== Finals ===
Quarterfinals
1	(United States) Helen Moody	6	7
(Switzerland) Lolette Payot	2	5
4	(Germany) Hilde Krahwinkel	6	6
5	(United Kingdom) Eileen Fearnley Whittingstall	3	3
6	(United States) Helen Jacobs	4	4
3	(France) Simonne Mathieu	6	6
7	(United Kingdom) Betty Nuthall	5	6	0
2	(Germany) Cilly Aussem	7	4	0^{r}

Semifinals
1	(United States) Helen Moody	6	10
4	(Germany) Hilde Krahwinkel	3	8
3	(France) Simonne Mathieu	6	6
7	(United Kingdom) Betty Nuthall	2	4

Finals
1	(United States) Helen Moody	7	6
3	(France) Simonne Mathieu	5	1

=== Earlier rounds ===
==== Section 1 ====
First round
(Switzerland) Payot	6	6
(France) Wyns-Speranza	1	3
(United Kingdom) Hewitt	6	6
(France) Gallay	3	0

Second round
1	(United States) Moody	6	6
(France) Beauge	0	1
(Netherlands) Couquerque	6	6
(Spain) Pons	2	2
8	(Spain) De Alvarez
(France) Lebesnerais
(Switzerland) Payot	6	0
(United Kingdom) Hewitt	2	0^{r}

Third round
1	(United States) Moody	6	6
(Netherlands) Couquerque	4	2
8	(Spain) De Alvarez
(Switzerland) Payot

Quarterfinals
1	(United States) Moody	6	7
(Switzerland) Payot	2	5

==== Section 2 ====
First round
4	(Germany) Krahwinkel	6	6
(France) Charnelet	2	1
(France) Claude Anet	6	6
(France) Macready	2	4
(France) Adamoff
(France) Holzschuch
(United States) Burke	6	6
(France) Gallay	3	4
5	(United Kingdom) Whittingstall	6	6
(France) Amaury	3	2
(Netherlands) Dros-Canters	4	4
(France) Barbier	6	6
(Italy) Valerio	6	6
(France) Golding	1	1
(France) Rosambert	6	6
(United Kingdom) Dyson	1	0

Second round
4	(Germany) Krahwinkel	6	6
(France) Claude Anet	3	1
(France) Adamoff	6	6
(United States) Burke	3	4
5	(United Kingdom) Whittingstall	6	6
(France) Barbier	2	2
(Italy) Valerio	10	6	1
(France) Rosambert	12	3	4^{r}

Third round
4	(Germany) Krahwinkel	1	7	6
(France) Adamoff	6	5	0
5	(United Kingdom) Whittingstall	6	1	6
(Italy) Valerio	2	6	2

Quarterfinals
4	(Germany) Krahwinkel	6	6
5	(United Kingdom) Whittingstall	3	3

==== Section 3 ====
First round
(United Kingdom) Noel	14	4	0
(France) Metaxa	12	6	6
(France) Danet	1	1
(United Kingdom) Scriven	6	6
(France) Vaussard	6	1
(Germany) Peitz	8	6
(France) Freville	0	2
6	(United States) Jacobs	6	6
(United Kingdom) Thomas
(France) Goldschmidt
(France) Kleinadel
(United States) Ryan
(France) Belliard	6	6
(France) Corbiere	3	1
(United Kingdom) Rudd
3	(France) Mathieu

Second round
(France) Metaxa	6	3	6
(United Kingdom) Scriven	2	6	3
(Germany) Peitz	6	0	5
6	(United States) Jacobs	4	6	7
(France) Goldschmidt	6	6
(France) Kleinadel	2	3
(France) Belliard	3	1
3	(France) Mathieu	6	6

Third round
(France) Metaxa	3	3
6	(United States) Jacobs	6	6
(France) Goldschmidt	0	2
3	(France) Mathieu	6	6

Quarterfinals
6	(United States) Jacobs	4	4
3	(France) Mathieu	6	6

==== Section 4 ====
First round
(France) Bellander
(France) Berthet
(France) Row	0	4
(Belgium) Sigart	6	6

Second round
(France) Berthet	3	6
(Belgium) Sigart	6	8
(France) Fournier	0	0
7	(United Kingdom) Nuthall	6	6
Rubowska	0	0
(France) Henrotin	6	6
(France) Bernard
2	(Germany) Aussem

Third round
(Belgium) Sigart	4	2
7	(United Kingdom) Nuthall	6	6
(France) Henrotin	6	2	3
2	(Germany) Aussem	4	6	6

Quarterfinals
7	(United Kingdom) Nuthall	5	6	0
2	(Germany) Aussem	7	4	0^{r}

Preceded by 1932 Australian Championships – Women's singles	Grand Slam women's singles	Succeeded by 1932 Wimbledon Championships – Women's singles
