= 1924 U.S. National Championships – Women's singles =

Women's singles
- 1924 U.S. National Championships

Final
- Champion: (United States) Helen Wills
- Runner-up: (United States) Molla Mallory
- Score: 6–1, 6–3

Details
- Draw: 64

Events
Singles	men	women
Doubles	men	women
← 1923 ·	U.S. National Championships	· 1925 →

First-seeded Helen Wills defeated Molla Mallory 6–1, 6–3 in the final to win the women's singles tennis title at the 1924 U.S. National Championships. The event was held at the West Side Tennis Club, Forest Hills, New York City. It was Wills's second consecutive U.S. National singles title.

== Draw ==
=== Final eight ===
Quarterfinals
(United States) Helen Wills	6	6
(United States) Marion Jessup	3	3
(United States) Mayme MacDonald	2	7	4
(United States) Mary K. Browne	6	5	6
(United States) Eleanor Goss	8	6
(United States) Martha Bayard	6	4
(United States) Edna Houser Roeser	1	1
(United States) Molla Mallory	6	6

Semifinals
(United States) Helen Wills	6	4	6
(United States) Mary K. Browne	4	6	3
(United States) Eleanor Goss	3	4
(United States) Molla Mallory	6	6

Finals
(United States) Helen Wills	6	6
(United States) Molla Mallory	1	3

Preceded by 1924 Wimbledon Championships – Women's singles	Grand Slam women's singles	Succeeded by 1925 Australasian Championships – Women's singles
