= 1923 U.S. National Championships – Women's singles =

Women's singles
- 1923 U.S. National Championships

Final
- Champion: (United States) Helen Wills
- Runner-up: (United States) Molla Mallory
- Score: 6–2, 6–1

Details
- Draw: 64

Events
Singles	men	women
Doubles	men	women
← 1922 ·	U.S. National Championships	· 1924 →

First-seeded seventeen year-old Helen Wills defeated Molla Mallory 6–2, 6–1 in the final to win the women's singles tennis title at the 1923 U.S. National Championships. The event was held at the West Side Tennis Club, Forest Hills, New York City. It was Wills' first U.S. National singles title.

== Draw ==
=== Final eight ===
Quarterfinals
(United States) Molla Mallory	6	6
(United States) Helen Hooker	3	1
(United States) Leslie Bancroft	3	1
(United Kingdom) Mabel Clayton	6	6
(United States) Helen Wills	2	6	7
(United Kingdom) Kitty McKane	6	2	5
(United States) Eleanor Goss	6	2	8
(United Kingdom) Phyllis Covell	1	6	6

Semifinals
(United States) Molla Mallory	6	6
(United Kingdom) Mabel Clayton	4	2
(United States) Helen Wills	6	6
(United States) Eleanor Goss	4	0

Finals
(United States) Molla Mallory	2	1
(United States) Helen Wills	6	6

Preceded by 1923 Wimbledon Championships – Women's singles	Grand Slam women's singles	Succeeded by 1924 Australasian Championships – Women's singles
