= 1932 French Championships (tennis) =

- Date: 22 May – 6 June 1932
- Edition: 37th
- Category: 8th Grand Slam (ITF)
- Surface: Clay
- Location: Paris (XVI^{e}), France
- Venue: Stade Roland Garros

Champions

Men's singles
- (France) Henri Cochet

Women's singles
- (United States) Helen Wills Moody

Men's doubles
- (France) Henri Cochet / (France) Jacques Brugnon

Women's doubles
- (United States) Helen Wills Moody / (United States) Elizabeth Ryan

Mixed doubles
- (United Kingdom) Betty Nuthall / (United Kingdom) Fred Perry
← 1931 ·	French Championships	· 1933 →

The 1932 French Championships (now known as the French Open) was a tennis tournament that took place on the outdoor clay courts at the Stade Roland-Garros in Paris, France. The tournament ran from 22 May until 6 June. It was the 37th staging of the French Championships and the second Grand Slam tournament of the year.

Henri Cochet and Helen Wills Moody won their final French Championships. For Cochet, it was his fifth win, for Wills Moody, her fourth.

== Finals ==
=== Men's singles ===
(France) Henri Cochet (FRA) defeated (Italy) Giorgio de Stefani (ITA), 6–0, 6–4, 4–6, 6–3

=== Women's singles ===
(United States) Helen Wills Moody (USA) defeated (France) Simonne Mathieu (FRA) 7–5, 6–1

=== Men's doubles ===
(France) Henri Cochet (FRA) / (France) Jacques Brugnon (FRA) defeated (France) Christian Boussus (FRA) / (France) Marcel Bernard (FRA) 6–4, 3–6, 7–5, 6–3

=== Women's doubles ===
(United States) Helen Wills Moody (USA) / (United States) Elizabeth Ryan (USA) defeated (United Kingdom) Betty Nuthall (GBR) / (United Kingdom) Eileen Bennett Whittingstall (GBR) 6–1, 6–3

=== Mixed doubles ===
(United Kingdom) Betty Nuthall (GBR) / (United Kingdom) Fred Perry (GBR) defeated (United States) Helen Wills Moody (USA) / (United States) Sidney Wood (USA) 6–4, 6–2

Preceded by 1932 Australian Championships	Grand Slams	Succeeded by 1932 Wimbledon Championships
