= 1924 U.S. National Championships (tennis) =

- Date: August 25 – September 2 (M); August 11 – 16 (W)
- Edition: 44th
- Category: Grand Slam (ITF)
- Surface: Grass
- Location: Forest Hills, Queens; New York City, New York
- Venue: West Side Tennis Club

Champions

Men's singles
- (United States) Bill Tilden

Women's singles
- (United States) Helen Wills Moody

Men's doubles
- (United States) Howard Kinsey / (United States) Robert Kinsey

Women's doubles
- (United States) Hazel Hotchkiss Wightman / (United States) Helen Wills

Mixed doubles
- (United States) Helen Wills / (United States) Vincent Richards
- U.S. National Championships

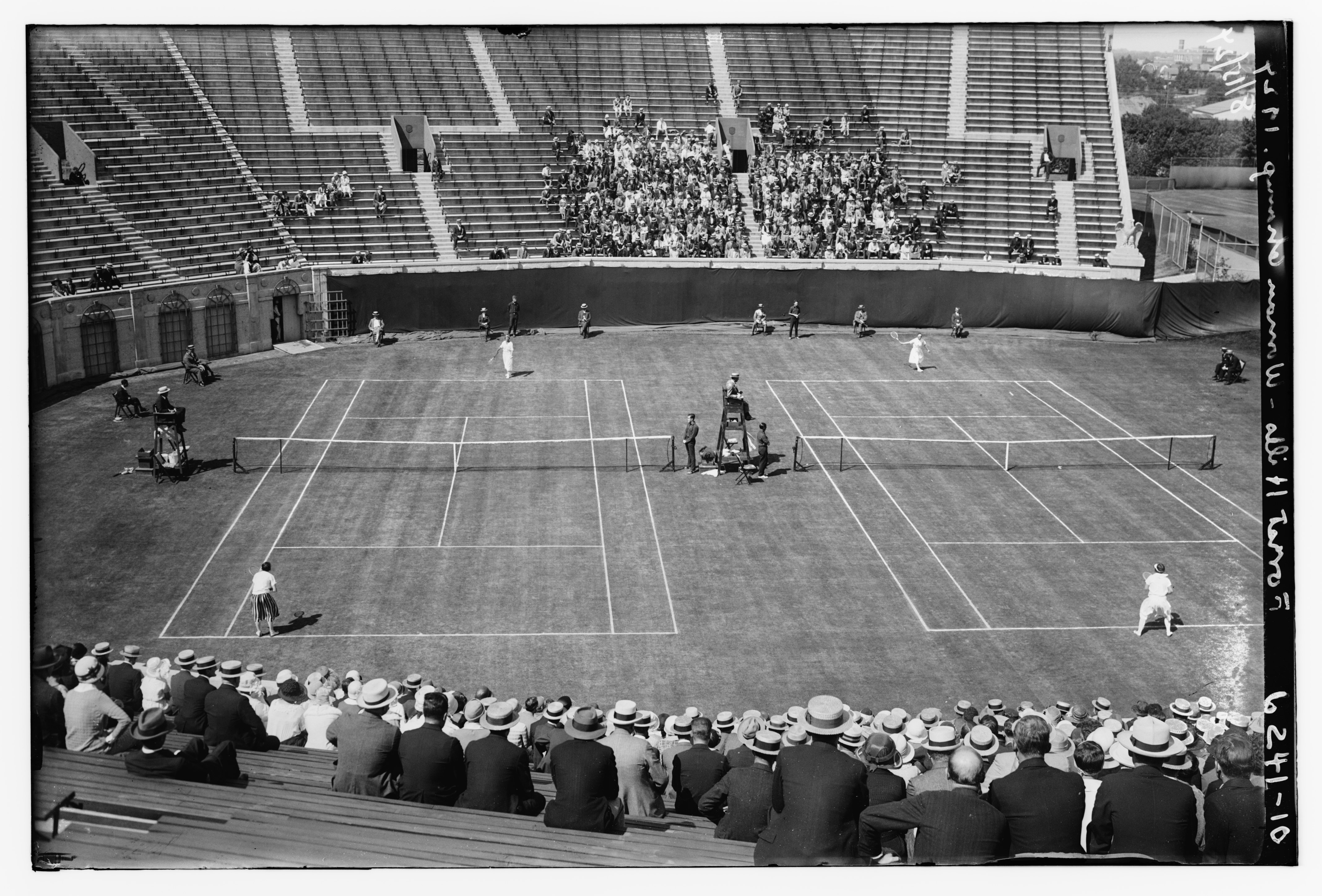
Still image from the championship

The 1924 U.S. National Championships (now known as the US Open) was a tennis tournament that took place on the outdoor grass courts at the West Side Tennis Club, Forest Hills in New York City, New York. The women's tournament was held from August 11 until August 16 while the men's tournament ran from August 25 until September 2. It was the 44th staging of the U.S. National Championships and the third Grand Slam tennis event of the year.

== Finals ==
=== Men's singles ===
(United States) Bill Tilden defeated (United States) Bill Johnston 6–1, 9–7, 6–2

=== Women's singles ===
(United States) Helen Wills defeated (United States) Molla Mallory 6–1, 6–3

=== Men's doubles ===
(United States) Howard Kinsey / (United States) Robert Kinsey defeated (Australia) Gerald Patterson / (Australia) Pat O'Hara Wood 7–5, 5–7, 7–9, 6–3, 6–4

=== Women's doubles ===
(United States) Hazel Hotchkiss Wightman / (United States) Helen Wills defeated (United States) Eleanor Goss / (United States) Marion Zinderstein Jessup 6–4, 6–3

=== Mixed doubles ===
(United States) Helen Wills / (United States) Vincent Richards defeated (United States) Molla Mallory / (United States) Bill Tilden 6–8, 7–5, 6–0

Preceded by 1924 Wimbledon Championships	Grand Slams	Succeeded by 1925 Australasian Championships
