= Helen Wills =

American tennis player (1905–1998)

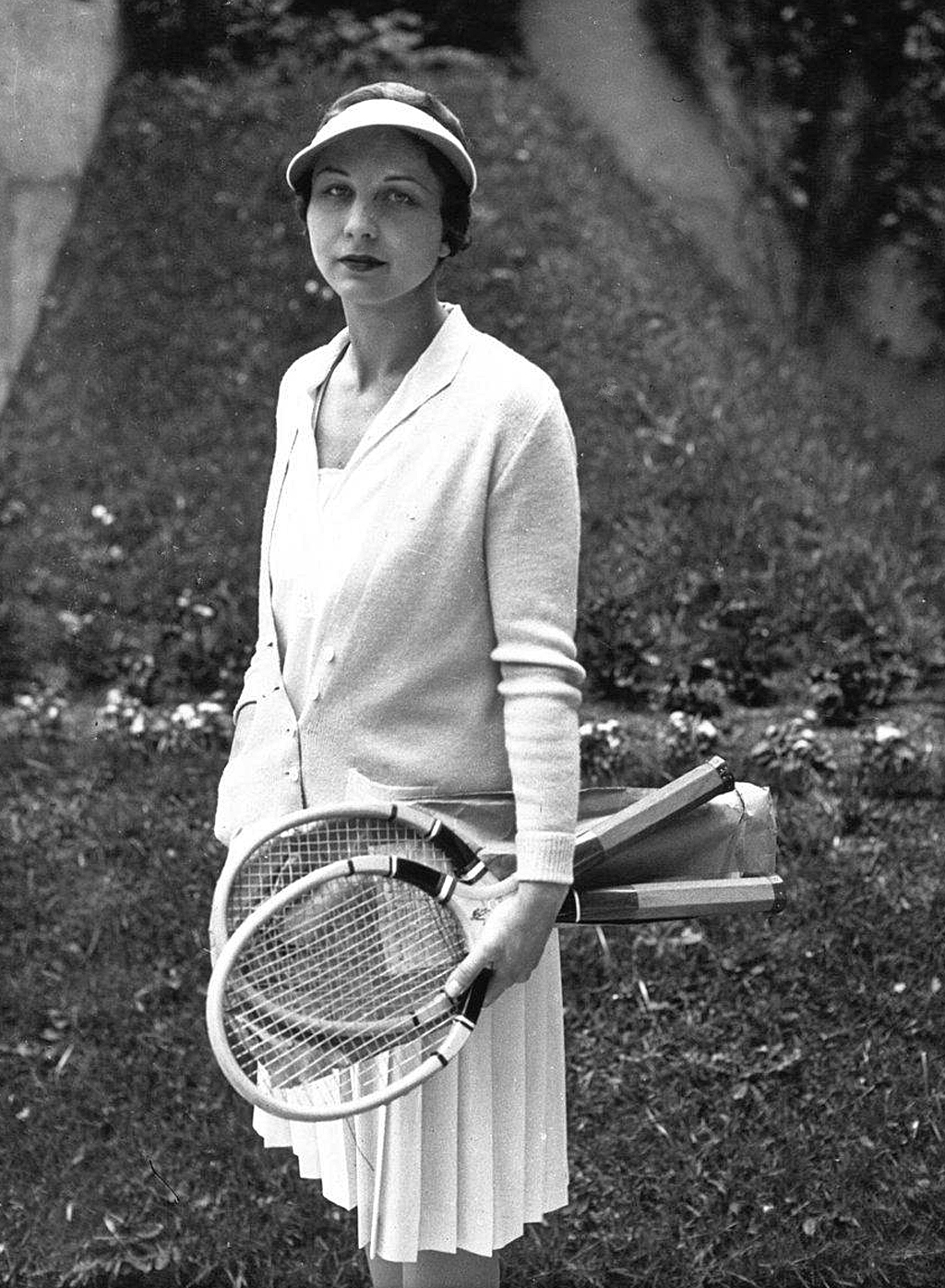
- Wills in 1932
- Full name: Helen Newington Wills
- Country (sports): United States
- Born: October 6, 1905 Centerville, California, US
- Died: January 1, 1998 (aged 92) Carmel, California, US
- Height: 5 ft 7.5 in (1.71 m)
- Retired: 1938
- Int. Tennis HoF: 1959 (member page)

Singles
- Career record: 398–35
- Highest ranking: No. 1 (1927)

Grand Slam singles results
- French Open: W (1928, 1929, 1930, 1932)
- Wimbledon: W (1927, 1928, 1929, 1930, 1932, 1933, 1935, 1938)
- US Open: W (1923, 1924, 1925, 1927, 1928, 1929, 1931)

Doubles
- Highest ranking: No. 1 (1924)

Grand Slam doubles results
- French Open: W (1930, 1932)
- Wimbledon: W (1924, 1927, 1930)
- US Open: W (1922, 1924, 1925, 1928)

Grand Slam mixed doubles results
- French Open: F (1928, 1929, 1932)
- Wimbledon: W (1929)
- US Open: W (1924, 1928)

Team competitions
- Wightman Cup: (1923, 1927, 1929, 1931, 1932, 1938)
Medal record
Representing United States
Olympic Games – Tennis
Gold medal – first place	1924 Paris	Singles
Gold medal – first place	1924 Paris	Doubles

Helen Newington Wills (October 6, 1905 – January 1, 1998), also known by her married names Helen Wills Moody and Helen Wills Roark, was an American tennis player. She won 31 Grand Slam tournament titles (singles, doubles, and mixed doubles) during her career, including 19 singles titles.

Wills was the first American woman athlete to become a global celebrity, making friends with royalty and film stars despite her preference for staying out of the limelight. She was admired for her graceful physique and for her fluid motion. She was part of a new tennis fashion, playing in knee-length pleated skirts rather than the longer ones of her predecessors, and was known for wearing her hallmark white visor, which would become a popular tennis attire among players at all levels of the sport right up to the present day.

Unusually, she practiced against men to hone her craft, and she played a relentless predominantly baseline game, wearing down her female opponents with power and accuracy. In February 1926 she played a high-profile and widely publicized match against Suzanne Lenglen which was called the Match of the Century.

Wills had a 180-match win streak from 1927 until 1933. In 1933, she beat the eighth-ranked US male player in an exhibition match. Her record of eight wins at Wimbledon was not surpassed until 1990 when Martina Navratilova won her ninth. She was said to be "arguably the most dominant tennis player of the 20th century", and has been called by some (including Jack Kramer, Harry Hopman, Mercer Beasley, Don Budge, and AP News) the greatest female player in history.

== Early life ==
She was born as Helen Newington Wills on October 6, 1905, in Centerville, Alameda County, California (now Fremont), near San Francisco. She was the only child of Clarence A. Wills, a physician and surgeon at Alameda County Infirmary and Catherine Anderson, who had graduated with a B.S. degree in Social Science at the University of California at Berkeley. Her parents had married on July 1, 1904, in Yolo County, California.

She was tutored by her mother at home until she was eight years old. After her father enlisted in the military in December 1917 and was posted in France with the American Expeditionary Forces her mother enrolled her at Bishop Hopkins Hall in Burlington, Vermont. When World War I ended the family moved back to Northern California, to Berkeley, where they took up residence near Live Oak Park. Wills enrolled as a ninth-grader at the Anna Head School, a private day and boarding school, where she graduated in 1923 at the top of her class. Her father's family grew wheat and kept a ranch near Antioch, and she occasionally practiced her tennis game nearby at the Byron Hot Springs resort. Wills attended the University of California, Berkeley, as both her parents had done, on an academic scholarship, and graduated in 1925 as a member of Phi Beta Kappa honor society.

When she was eight years old, her father bought her a tennis racket and they practiced on the dirt courts next to the Alameda County Hospital as well as at Live Oak Park. Wills' interest in tennis was kindled after watching exhibition matches by famous Californian players including May Sutton, Bill Johnston and her particular favorite, Maurice McLoughlin. In August 1919, she joined the Berkeley Tennis Club as a junior member on the advice of tennis coach William "Pop" Fuller who was a friend of her father. In the spring of 1920, she practiced for a few weeks with Hazel Hotchkiss Wightman, four-time winner of the U.S. Championships singles title, on strokes, footwork and tactics.

== Tennis career ==
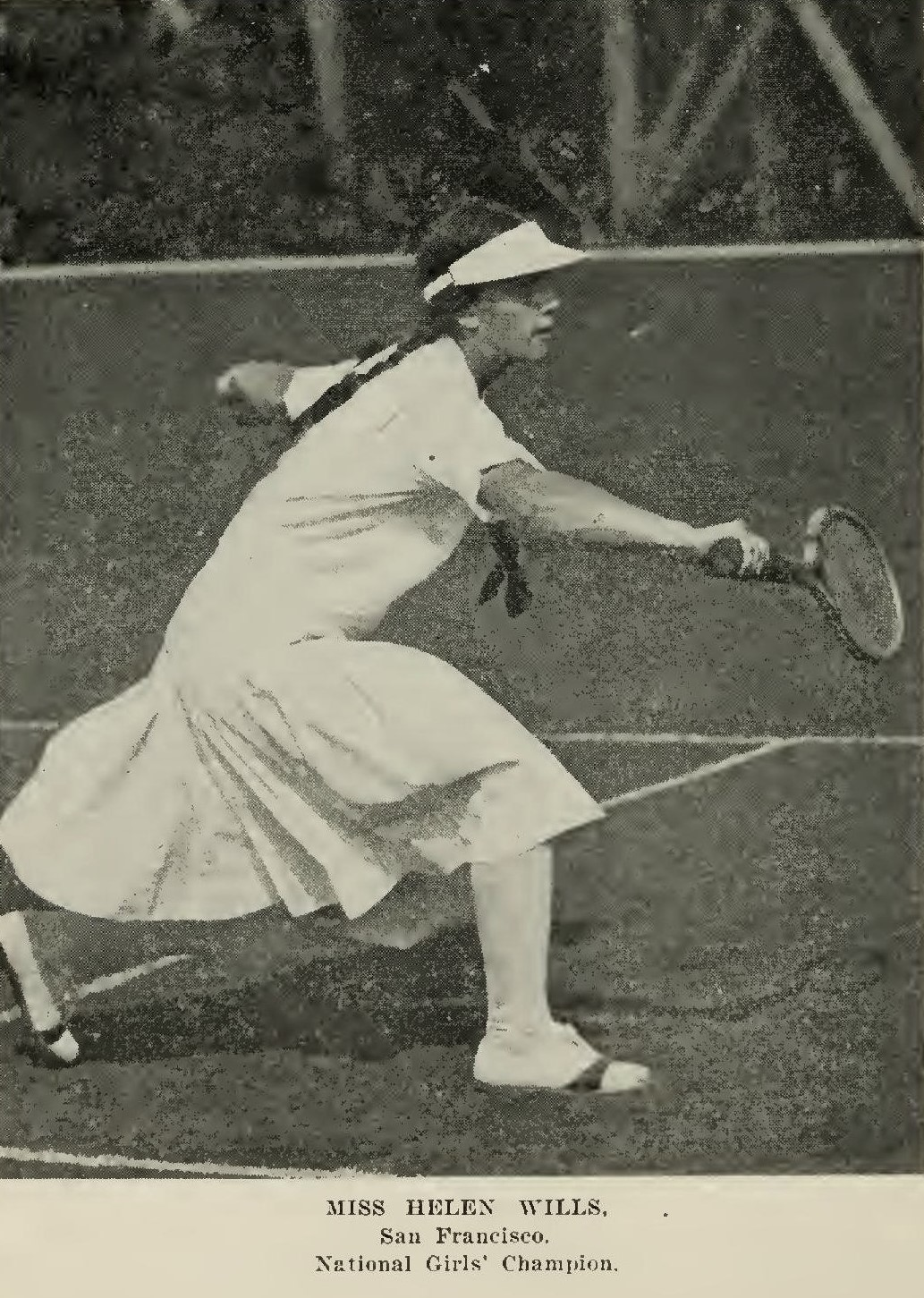
Wills in 1921

=== 1919-21: First tournaments and titles ===
In September 1919, at the age of 13, she entered her first tournament, the California State Championships, held at her own Berkeley Tennis Club. After a bye in the first round she lost in two close sets to Marjorie Wale. Reporting on the tournament the San Francisco Examiner commented that "she will bear watching in the future". By the end of 1919 she was the 7th ranked junior player in California. In 1920 she competed in four tournaments in Northern California (Sacramento, Berkeley and San Francisco) and at the end of 1920 she was the 9th ranked singles player in California. In July 1921 she traveled to the East Coast for the first time where she played in four warm-up tournaments on grass in preparation for the U.S. Girls National Championships in Forest Hills. The trip was sponsored by the California Tennis Association. In September 1921, Wills won the singles and doubles titles at the California State Championships, defeating Helen Baker in the final in three sets. At the end of 1921 Wills was ranked No. 14 in the national singles, No. 2 in the Californian ranking, behind Helen Baker and No. 1 in the national juniors.

=== 1922: U.S. Championships finalist ===
In May 1922 she won the singles title at the Pacific Coast Championships, beating Ream Leachman in the final. During Wills's run of East Coast grass court tournaments in the run up to the U.S. Championships she lost four times to Leslie Bancroft. At the 1922 U.S. Championships she participated for the first time in the women's singles event and reached the final, losing just one set to Marion Zinderstein Jessup in the quarterfinal. The New York Times described the final between 16-year old Wills against 38-year old six-time champion Molla Mallory as the "battle of youth against experience". (Note: The age difference Mallory and Wills is the largest in a final of a Grand Slam tournament.) Mallory won the final in two sets to gain her seventh title. Wills won her first Grand Slam title in the doubles event, partnering Zinderstein Jessup, after a three-sets victory in the final against Mallory and Edith Sigourney. Partnering Howard Kinsey she was runner-up in the mixed doubles event to Mary Browne and Bill Tilden. She also took part in the girls' singles championship and successfully defended her 1921 title. At the end of the year she was the No. 3 ranked singles player nationally and the top-ranked player in California.

=== 1923: First U.S. Championships title ===
Wills defended her Pacific Coast Championships singles title in June when she defeated Charlotte Hosmer in the final. On August 10, 1923 (Note: The event was played at the West Side Tennis Club in Forest Hills and was the inauguration of the new Forest Hills Stadium.) Wills made her debut in the inaugural Wightman Cup, the annual team tennis competition for women contested between teams from the United States and Great Britain. She won both her singles matches against Mabel Clayton and Kitty McKane as well as her doubles match with Mallory. Directly following the Wightman Cup she entered the U.S. Championships and won her first women's U.S. national title at the age of 17 after a straight-sets victory in the final against seven-time champion Molla Mallory, making her the youngest champion at that time. After returning to California she won her final tournament of the year, the California State Championships, against Hosmer in the final. She finished the year ranked No. 1 in California as well as nationally. A. Wallis Myers of The Daily Telegraph ranked her No. 3 in the world behind Lenglen and McKane.

=== 1924: Olympic and U.S. champion ===
During the winter months Wills worked on her game and according to her trainer Pop Fuller she had improved her overhead, service and footwork. In April the United States Lawn Tennis Association (USLTA) selected Wills for the Olympic team and for the Wightman Cup and the Wimbledon Championships leading up to the Olympics. On May 14 Wills departed New York on board the RMS Berengaria for her first trip to Europe. There was excitement in the press about the prospect of an encounter with Suzanne Lenglen, the French world No. 1 player and five-time Wimbledon champion. Upon her arrival in England Wills focused on practice sessions to get accustomed to the grass courts instead of playing warm-up tournaments. The Wightman Cup was played in June on the Wimbledon grass courts at the All England Lawn Tennis and Croquet Club. Wills lost both her singles matches, to Phyllis Covell and Kitty McKane, (Note: Bill Tilden, writing in American Lawn Tennis, blamed her defeats on her lack of tournament play which Wills later acknowledged.) but won the doubles with Hazel Hotchkiss Wightman. Wills entered her first Wimbledon Championships a few days after the conclusion of the Wightman Cup. She came through the draw with ease and reached the final without the loss of a set. Her opponent in the final McKane had received a walkover in the semifinal after Lenglen withdrew due to illness. Wills won the first set and led 4–1 in the second with a game point for 5–1 but McKane staged a comeback with attacking play and won the next two sets, and the title, against a tiring Wills. (Note: When asked years later why she had lost Wills commented: "Something happened to me that had never happened before. I lost my concentration. But I never let that happen again.".) It would be Will's only loss in the Wimbledon singles event during her career. She did win the doubles event partnering Hotchkiss Wightman, her first Wimbledon title, after a win in two sets in the final against Covell and McKane.

Wills entered the singles and doubles competitions at the 1924 Olympics in Paris, France. The tennis tournament was played on outdoor clay courts at the Stade Olympique Yves-du-Manoir in Colombes, a northwestern suburb of Paris. It was the last Olympics where tennis was a medal event (Note: At the 1968 Olympics in Mexico City tennis returned to the program as an exhibition and a demonstration event. At the 1984 Summer Olympics in Los Angeles tennis was a demonstration sport.) until the sport returned at the 1988 Olympics in Seoul, South Korea. Wills won the Olympic gold medal in both the singles and doubles events. In the singles event she had a bye in the first round and won her next four matches in straight sets to reach the final which was played on July 19. Her opponent in the final was Julie Vlasto of France who was defeated in two sets. In the doubles event she partnered veteran Hazel Wightman. The team reached the semifinal without playing, after a bye in the first round followed by two walkovers. The final against Covell and McKane was a repeat of the Wimbledon final and again the result was a two-sets victory for Wightman and Wills. In early August she returned to the United States to compete in the U.S. Championships. For the first time in her career she won all three titles in the singles, doubles and mixed doubles events. For the third successive year she played against Mallory in the singles final and like in 1923 won in straight sets. The mixed doubles event was played at the Longwood Cricket Club in Brookline where she partnered Vinnie Richards to win the final against Mallory and Tilden. In September she won the California State Championships against May Sutton in the final. She was again ranked No. 3 in the world behind Lenglen and McKane by A. Wallis Myers.

=== 1925: Third U.S. Championships title ===
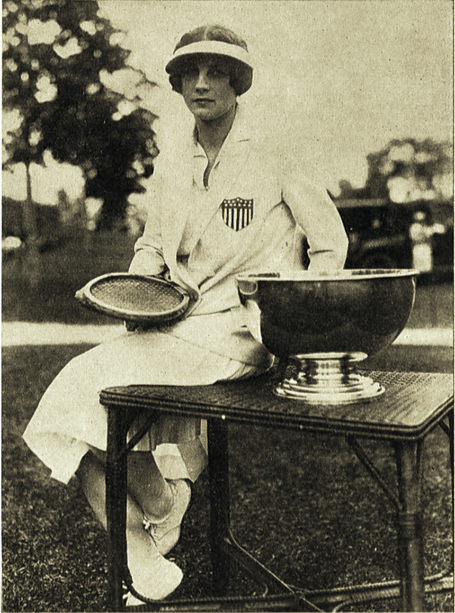
Wills in 1925

On advice of her mother, Wills did not travel to Europe and therefore did not take part in the Wimbledon Championships or in the first French Championships that were open to players who were neither French citizens nor residents of France. Wills won an invitational tournament in Pasadena in February. In July, she traveled to the East Coast to play the tradition grass court warm-up events for the U.S. Nationals. She won the singles titles at the Longwood Invitational in Brookline, against Marion Zinderstein Jessup, and at the Essex Country Club Invitational against Mary Browne. At the Seabright Invitational she lost the final to Elizabeth Ryan who, playing without shoes, dealt better with the heavy, soggy courts which prevented Wills from playing her usual driving game. It would be her only singles loss of the year. At the New York State Championships in Westchester she defeated Mallory in the final in three sets. The third edition of the Wightman Cup was played in August at Forest Hills. Wills won both her singles matches against Joan Fry and McKane but lost the decisive doubles match with Mary Brown against Evelyn Colyer and McKane. At the U.S. Championships which started on August 17, she came back from being a set down in both the quarterfinal, against Fry, and the semifinal, against Eleanor Goss, to reach the singles final. In the final against McKane she again lost the first set but won the next two to win her third consecutive U.S. Championships title at the age of 19. In mid September she also won the California State Championships for the third consecutive time, defeating Lucy McCune in the final without the loss of a game. In late September A. Wallis Myers ranked Wills No. 2 in the world behind Lenglen. Also in September she was elected to the Phi Beta Kappa honor society by the University of California.

=== 1926: Match of the Century and appendicitis ===
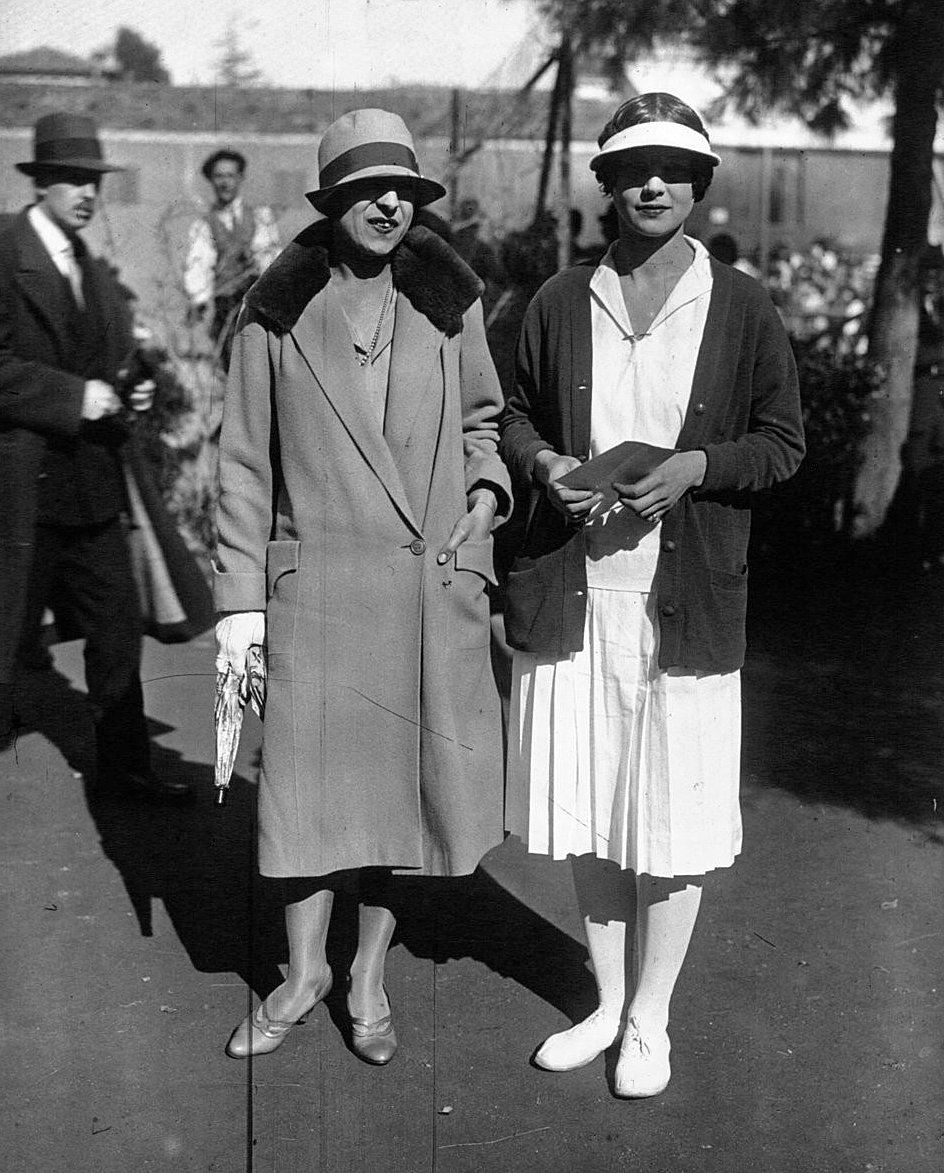
Suzanne Lenglen (left) and Helen Wills Moody in Cannes, 1926

On January 6 Wills departed New York en route to Le Havre, France with the aim to compete in the clay court Riviera tournaments and play against Suzanne Lenglen. She stated that she also wanted to do sightseeing and study art. At the end of January she won the Metropole and Gallia tournaments in Cannes. On February 16, 1926, the 20-year-old Wills met 26-year-old Suzanne Lenglen, six-time Wimbledon champion, in the final of a tournament at the Carlton Club in Cannes in the Match of the Century. It was the only time they played each other in singles competition. Public anticipation of their match was immense, resulting in high scalper ticket prices. Roofs and windows of nearby buildings were crowded with spectators, including King Gustaf V of Sweden. Both players were nervous, with Lenglen drinking brandy and water at one point to calm her nerves. Lenglen won the match 6–3, 8–6 after being down 2–1 in the first set and 5–4 in the second set. Wills had a set point in the second set and believed she had won the point, but a linesman disagreed. In one of the few times she showed emotion on court, she spoke angrily to the linesman over the call. After the match, Lenglen's father advised her that she would lose her next match to Wills if they met again soon, and Lenglen avoided Wills for the remainder of the spring. Following the Lenglen match Wills won the Riviera tournaments in Beaulieu, Monte Carlo, Menton, as well as the South of France Championships and the Cannes Club tournament. Lenglen did not take part in these singles events. Wills did not get a second chance to meet Lenglen due to an emergency appendectomy on June 5, during the French Championships, which caused her to default her second-round match and withdraw from Wimbledon, which also was considered a default. Lenglen turned professional after the 1926 season.

After she returned to the United States in July, Wills attempted a comeback from her appendectomy. She won the East Hampton tournament against Mary Brown but at Seabright she lost the final to Elizabeth Ryan for the second year running. After another defeat, in the semifinal of the New York State Championships to Mallory, and on the advice of her doctor, she withdrew from that year's U.S. Championships and returned to Berkeley. She did not play any tournaments for the remainder of the year and instead focused on her studies at Berkeley. Apart from those two losses, beginning with the 1923 U.S. Championships, Wills lost only five matches in three years: once to Lenglen, twice to Kathleen McKane Godfree, and twice to Elizabeth Ryan. Wills had winning overall records against the latter two.

=== 1927: Wimbledon and U.S. champion ===
Wills' season started in March at the Hotel Huntington Invitation which she won in the final against Marrion Williams. Together with her mother she traveled to England in May and in June won the North London Championships against Elisabeth Ryan and the Kent Championships in Beckenham against Kitty McKane Godfree. She did not take part in the French Championships. At the Wimbledon Championships full seedings were used for the first time (Note: In 1924 a simplified seeding system was used whereby up to four players from a nation would be placed in four different quarters of the draw.) and Wills was the top-seeded singles player. She lost a set to Gwen Sterry in the first round, the last set she would lose in singles until 1933, but won all other matches in straight sets, including the final against fourth-seeded Lilí de Álvarez, to win her first Wimbledon singles title. (Note: She was the first American female player to win the Wimbledon singles title since May Sutton in 1905.) Partnering Elizabeth Ryan she won her second Wimbledon doubles title against the South African pair of Bobbie Heine and Irene Peacock. Directly after Wimbledon she returned to the United States where she won the Essex Country Club Invitational, defeating 18-year old Helen Jacobs in the final. It was the first competitive encounter with Jacobs in what would become an intense rivalry. Wills won both her singles matches and her doubles with Hotchkiss Wightman to help the U.S. team win the fifth edition of the Wightman Cup against Great Britain. At the U.S. Championships in August she defeated Kea Bouman, winner of the French Championships, in the quarterfinal and Helen Jacobs in the semifinal to reach her fifth final, where she met 16-year old Betty Nuthall from Great Britain who served underhand. Wills was victorious in straight sets to win her fourth U.S. title. After the Championships, she stayed in New York and did not play any tournaments for the rest of the year. For the first time in her career she was ranked No. 1 in the world by A. Wallis Myers, in front of Álvarez and Ryan.

=== 1928: French, Wimbledon and U.S. champion ===
The 1928 season started in April when Wills traveled to France to compete in the French Championships. She was seeded first in a field of 37 players and won the singles title with ease after a victory in the final against eighth-seeded Eileen Bennett. The American Lawn Tennis magazine commented that "Miss Wills [...] so far outclasses the top flights of women throughout the world that she has no one who really can extend her." She was runner-up in the mixed doubles with Frank Hunter, losing the final to Eileen Bennett and Henri Cochet. Wills then traveled to The Hague in May to compete in an international match against the Netherlands, beating Madzy Rollin Couquerque and Kea Bouman, before traveling to the All England Club in London for the sixth edition of the Wightman Cup. Wills won both her singles matches but lost the deciding doubles match with Penelope Anderson against Eileen Bennett and Phoebe Holcroft Watson. At Wimbledon, Wills was seeded first, and won her second consecutive singles title, again after a two-sets victory in the final against Lilí de Álvarez. She did not take part in the doubles event and reached the semifinal of the mixed doubles with Francis Hunter. Upon return to the United States she defended her title at the Essex Country Club Invitational against Edith Cross and won at East Hampton against Helen Jacobs. At the U.S. Championships, which started on August 20, Wills went through the tournament without losing a set and beat Helen Jacobs is the final. It was the first time they met in a Grand Slam final. With Hotchkiss Wightman, she won the doubles final against compatriots Edith Cross and Anna McCune Harper. Subsequently, she traveled to Boston where she won the mixed doubles event partnering John Hawkes. In her autobiography Fifteen-Thirty, she commented that Hawkes was the best mixed doubles partner with whom she had ever played. For the second time she was ranked No. 1 in the world by A. Wallis Myers, in front of Álvarez and Daphne Akhurst.

=== 1929: Defense of French, Wimbledon and U.S. titles ===
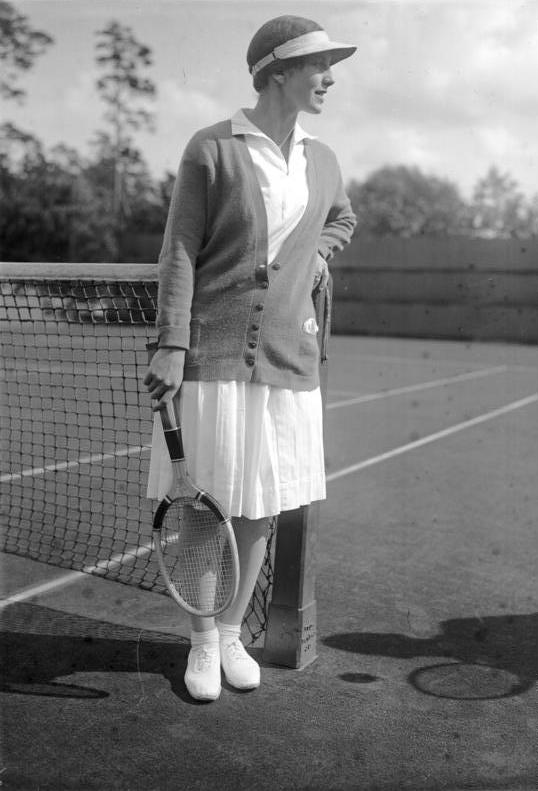
Helen Wills Moody in June 1929 at the Rot-Weiss Tennis Club in Berlin.

As in 1928, Wills' season started in April when she traveled to France to compete in the French Championships, which started on May 20. Edith Cross joined her on the trip. She successfully defended her French singles title by defeating sixth-seeded home favorite Simonne Mathieu in the final. In the doubles event, she teamed up with Edith Cross and lost in the quarterfinals to eventual champions Lilí de Álvarez and Kea Bouman. She played in the mixed doubles with Frank Hunter, and were beaten in the final by the Anglo-French team of Eileen Bennett and Henri Cochet. Wills then played international matches, as part of a U.S. team, against the Netherlands in May, beating Madzy Rollin Couquerque and Kea Bouman, and against Germany, played at the Rot-Weiss Tennis Club in Berlin in June, where she won against Cilly Aussem and Paula von Reznicek. At the Wimbledon Championships a third final against Lilí de Álvarez was anticipated but instead Wills faced fifth-seeded Helen Jacobs, their first encounter in a Wimbledon final. Wills won her third consecutive Wimbledon singles title in straight sets. With Edith Cross she lost in the third round of the doubles to Ermyntrude Harvey, but won the mixed doubles title with Frank Hunter against Ian Collins and Joan Fry. In the seventh edition of the Wightman Cup, played on August 8 and 9 at the West Side Tennis Club, Wills won both her singles matches, including a close two-sets win against Betty Nuthall, to help the U.S. team reclaim the cup. But, she lost her doubles match with Cross against Phoebe Holcroft Watson and Peggy Michell. Later that month, she won her sixth U.S. National Championships singles title after a victory in the final against second-seeded foreign player Phoebe Holcroft Watson. She played no further tournaments that year and, despite only competing in three tournaments, was ranked No. 1 in the world by A. Wallis Myers for the third successive time, this time ahead of Holcroft Watson and Jacobs.

=== 1930: French and Wimbledon titles ===
After her marriage in December 1929 she played tournaments under her married name Helen Wills Moody. Her first tournament of the year was the Hotel Huntington Invitation in Pasadena in March, where she defeated friend and frequent doubles partner Edith Cross in the final. In late April she traveled to Paris to compete in the French Championships. She won her third singles title in succession after defeating seventh-seeded Helen Jacobs in the final. Partnering Elizabeth Ryan, the doubles title was added to her list of trophies after a win in the final against the French pairing Simone Barbier and Simonne Mathieu. The eighth edition of the Wightman Cup, held at the All England Club in June, was won by the British team despite two victories in the singles by Wills. At the Wimbledon Championships first-seeded Wills reached the final after wins against seventh-seeded Phyllis Mudford in the quarterfinal and fifth-seeded Simonne Mathieu in the semifinal. She defeated Elizabeth Ryan, seeded eighth, in straight sets to win her fourth consecutive Wimbledon singles title, and with Ryan, also won the doubles title against Edith Cross and Sarah Palfrey. Wills did not defend her title at the U.S. Championships as she wanted to spend more time at home with her husband. She did compete at the Pacific Coast Championships where she won her fourth singles title after a victory in the final against Anna McCune Harper. For the fourth successive year she was ranked No. 1 in the world by A. Wallis Myers but she was excluded from the national ranking by the USLTA.

=== 1931: Regained U.S. title ===
In 1931, Wills did not travel to Europe to defend her French and Wimbledon titles, and only played in tournaments in the United States. Her first tournament was in July at the Essex Country Club Invitation in Massachusetts, where she defeated McCune Harper in the final, losing just one game. In early August Wills won the Seabright Invitational title for the first time after a double-bagel victory in the final against Helen Jacobs. At the 1931 Wightman Cup in August in Forest Hills, she won both her singles matches but lost the doubles with McCune Harper. At the U.S. National Championships she won her seventh (and last) singles title via a win in a 35-minute final against the British player Eileen Bennett Whittingstall. In the fall, she and her husband traveled to Japan, China and the Philippines. Wills played exhibition matches in Tokyo, Kobe and Yokohama. For the fifth time in succession she was ranked the No. 1 player in the world.

=== 1932: Back to Europe: French and Wimbledon titles ===
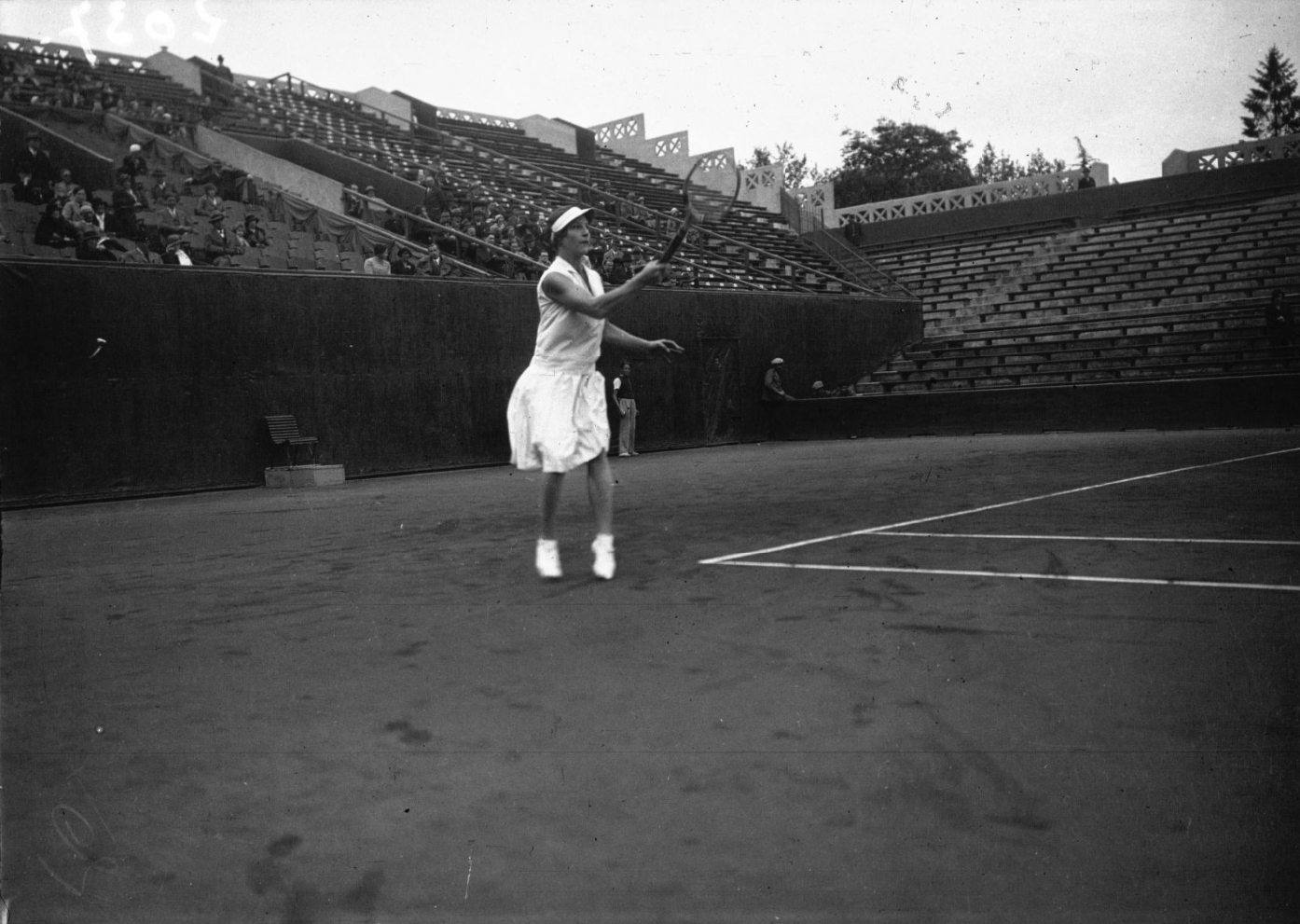
Helen Wills Moody in May 1932 at Roland Garros

Due to the economic depression in the United States, Wills and her husband decided to travel to several European countries. Wills departed New York in late April and said she wanted to compete in Europe every other year. She entered all three events of the French Championships, which was held from May 22 through June 6, without having played any warm-up tournaments. In the quarterfinal and semifinal of the singles event she survived setpoints but nevertheless won the title without losing a set when she beat Simonne Mathieu in the final. Her level of play was not quite as dominant as in previous years. She teamed up with Elizabeth Ryan to win the doubles title against Betty Nuthall and Eileen Bennett Whittingstall and in the mixed doubles she lost the final with Sidney Wood to Nuthall and Fred Perry. It was her last appearance at the French Championships. The day after the singles final she traveled to London to prepare for the Wightman Cup which was held on June 10 and 11 at the All England Club. The United States won the cup and Wills contributed with singles victories over Bennett Whittingstall and Dorothy Round but lost the doubles match with Sarah Palfrey.

At the Wimbledon Championships she encountered Helen Jacobs for the fourth time in a final of a Grand Slam tournament and as in previous occasions defeated her in straight sets to attain her fifth Wimbledon singles title. She played the mixed doubles event with compatriot Ellsworth Vines and were eliminated in the quarterfinal. In July she competed for the first time in the Dutch Championships in Noordwijk and won both the singles event, against Madzy Rollin Couquerque, as well as the doubles event with Elizbeth Ryan. Although Wills had indicated early in the year that she would defend her national U.S. title she announced in August that she would not do so and instead prolonged her stay in Europe. She then traveled on to Strasbourg, Germany where she won a tournament, beating Ilse Friedleben in the final. Afterwards she and her husband visited Switzerland, Sweden and Norway but she did not play in any further singles tournaments and for the sixth consecutive year was ranked the No. 1 player in the world.

=== 1933: Retirement in U.S. final ===
In an exhibition "Battle of the Sexes" match in San Francisco on January 28, 1933, Wills defeated Phil Neer, the eighth-ranked American male player 6–4 in a one-set match. She did not compete at the French Championships but traveled directly to England in May. She entered the Queen's Club Championships in June and reached the final to play against Elsie Goldsack Pittman but rain prevented play and the title was shared. At the Wimbledon Championships which started a week after Queen's she went through the draw with ease to reach the final against second-seeded Dorothy Round. Wills won the first set but lost the second by 6–8, the first set she had lost in competitive tennis since 1927, but won the final set to gain her sixth Wimbledon singles crown. After arriving back in New York on July 20 she felt pain and numbness in her right leg and following a consult at the New York Orthopedic Hospital decided to withdraw from the Wightman Cup in August. She was replaced by Sarah Palfrey.

Her streak of winning U.S. Championships seven times in seven attempts ended when she retired against Helen Jacobs during the 1933 final due to a back injury, trailing 0–3 with a double break in the third set. The loss ended her 45-match winning streak at the U.S. Championships. She was subsequently treated for a dislocated vertebrae.

=== 1934–35: Recovery and seventh Wimbledon title ===
In January 1934 she began receiving osteopathic treatments which made her feel better but she did not play any competitive tennis during the year. On the invitation of the Daily Mail she traveled to London to write articles on the Wimbledon tournament. On advice of her father she took up swimming and in early 1935 started to hit against a backboard to aide her recovery. After taking more than a year off to recuperate Wills returned to tennis in June 1935 when she entered two English warm-up tournaments for Wimbledon. She won the St. George's Hill Cub tournament against Elsie Pittmann but was defeated in straight sets in the semifinal of the Kent Championships by Kay Stammers. At Wimbledon she was seeded fourth behind Round, Sperling and Jacobs but won her seventh title, surviving a match point at 2–5 in the final set against third-seeded rival Jacobs.

=== 1936–38: Eighth Wimbledon title and retirement ===
Wills did not play any competitive singles tennis in 1936 and 1937 and traveled to England in late April 1938. In May she entered the North London Hard Court Tournament, her first singles competition in three years, and won the event by defeating Yvonne Law in the final. She also won the following Surrey Grass Court Championships against Margot Lumb in the final. Wills was persuaded by Hazel Wightman to participate in the Wightman Cup for the first time since 1932. On June 10 and 11 she won her singles matches against Margaret Scriven and Kay Stammers, contributing to the eighth consecutive cup win for the United States. At the Queen's Club Championships she lost in the semifinal to Hilde Sperling. In 1938 she again defeated her rival Helen Jacobs in two sets to win her eighth and last Wimbledon title before retiring permanently from playing in singles. In the following years she did occasionally compete in doubles or mixed doubles events. In a 1994 interview with Inside Tennis, she revealed that a dog bite, which happened in January 1943, ended her career:

Helen Wills: Well, it was during the war and my husband was at Fort Reilly, Kansas...It was the middle of winter, and I was walking my big police dog, Sultan. A little dog came barking wildly out of a house and grabbed my dog by the throat. Those little fox terriers have no sense. They're just wild. So my poor dog was being chewed to pieces and wasn't able to respond. But I wasn't going to have a dogfight under my feet so I let go of his collar. And then Sultan took this little dog and shook him, which he deserved. But in the fight, my index finger on my right hand was bitten...

William Simon: By the terrier?

Helen Wills: I don't know. Fury! Wild, stupid animal! But my poor old finger, the finger next to the thumb. The thumb is very important in tennis. So that was the end of my career. I couldn't manage. I never mentioned this before to anyone.

== Tennis legacy ==
=== Achievements ===
From 1919 through 1938, she amassed a 398–35 (91.9%) win–loss match record, including a winning streak of at least 158 matches, during which she did not lose a set. She was the first American woman to win the French Championships and in 1928 became the first tennis player, male or female, to win three Grand Slam tournament or Majors in one calendar year. During the 17-year period from 1922 through 1938, Wills entered 24 Grand Slam singles events, winning 19, finishing runner-up three times, and defaulting twice as a result of her appendectomy. Wills won 31 Grand Slam tournament titles (singles, women's doubles, and mixed doubles), including seven singles titles at the U.S. Championships, eight singles titles at Wimbledon, and four singles titles at the French Championships. Excluding her defaults at the French Championships and Wimbledon in 1926, she reached the final of every Grand Slam singles event she competed in. She never played at the Australian Championships.

Wills was a team member of the U.S. Wightman Cup in 1923, 1924, 1925, 1927, 1928, 1929, 1930, 1931, 1932, and 1938, winning the cup in 1923, 1927, 1929, 1931, 1932 and 1938. She compiled an overall Wightman Cup win–loss record of 20–9.

Jack Kramer, Harry Hopman, Mercer Beasley, Don Budge, and AP News called Wills the greatest female player in history.

=== Rankings ===
According to A. Wallis Myers of The Daily Telegraph and the Daily Mail, Wills was ranked in the world top ten from 1922 through 1925, 1927 through 1933, and in 1935 and 1938. She was world No. 1 in those rankings nine times, from 1927 through 1933 and in 1935 and 1938. Wills was included in the year-end top ten rankings issued by the United States Lawn Tennis Association from 1922 through 1925, 1927 through 1929, and in 1931 and 1933. She was the top-ranked U.S. player from 1923 through 1925 and 1927 through 1929. In 1950, sportswriter Grantland Rice ranked Helen Wills as the greatest female tennis player of all time.

=== Awards and honors ===
In 1935, she was named Female Athlete of the Year by the Associated Press. Wills was inducted into the International Tennis Hall of Fame in 1959 together with the late Bill Tilden who had died in 1953. They were the 22nd and 23rd members of the Hall of Fame. In 1981, Wills was inducted into the (San Francisco) Bay Area Athletic Hall of Fame. In 1996 Wills was inducted into the Women's Hall of Fame of the Intercollegiate Tennis Association.

In July 1926 and 1929, Wills appeared on the cover of Time magazine. The New York Times obituary described her as "arguably the most dominant tennis player of the 20th century".

Wills is name-checked in the Leonard Bernstein musical Wonderful Town, written in 1953 but set in 1935. In the song "Conga", Ruth Sherwood sings "What do you think of our rocks and reels?/ Mothersill's/ seasick pills?/ How do you feel about Helen Wills?"

== Playing style and personality ==
When asked in 1941 about whether Wills or Lenglen was the better player, Elizabeth Ryan, who played against both of them in singles and partnered both in doubles, said, "Suzanne, of course. She owned every kind of shot, plus a genius for knowing how and when to use them." However, Wills and Lenglen are seen as having different skills and strategies. Wills served and volleyed with unusually powerful forehand and backhand strokes, and she forced her opponents out of position by placing deep shots left and right. Lenglen was more physically nimble, and she was more imaginative—able to quickly change shots in response to conditions. Lenglen was a master of the drop shot and close net work, which was Wills' soft spot. Aware of her weakness at the net, Wills drove her opponents deep into the backcourt as much as possible. Playing Wills was, according to Helen Jacobs, like playing "a machine... with implacable concentration and undeniable skill" yet with little flexibility.

Analogizing Wills's game to poker, George Lott, a 12-time winner of Grand Slam doubles titles and a contemporary of Wills, once said, "Helen's expression rarely varied and she always tended strictly to business, but her opponents were never in doubt as to what she held: an excellent service, a powerful forehand, a strong backhand, a killer instinct, and no weaknesses. Five of a kind! Who would want to draw against that kind of hand?" Charlie Chaplin was once asked what he considered to be the most beautiful sight that he had ever seen. He responded that it was "the movement of Helen Wills playing tennis".

Wills was reported to be introverted and detached. On court, she rarely showed emotion, ignored her opponents, and took no notice of the crowd. Kitty McKane Godfree, who in 1924 inflicted the only defeat Wills suffered at Wimbledon during her career, said, "Helen was a very private person, and she didn't really make friends very much." Hazel Hotchkiss Wightman said, "Helen was really an unconfident and [socially] awkward girl—you have no idea how awkward.... I thought of Helen as an honestly shy person who was bewildered by how difficult it was to please most people." Because of her unchanging stoic expression, Grantland Rice, the American sportswriter, bestowed on Wills the nickname "Little Miss Poker Face". As her success and, ironically, unpopularity with the public increased, she was called "Queen Helen" and "the Imperial Helen". Wills said in her autobiography, "I had one thought and that was to put the ball across the net. I was simply myself, too deeply concentrated on the game for any extraneous thought."

=== Attire and racket ===
She typically wore a white sailor suit having a pleated knee-length skirt, white shoes, and a short sleeve top and a cerise-colored cardigan. The most iconic part of her attire was her signature white visor which she wore almost without exception since her junior playing days. In The Ladies Home Journal of April 1927 she commented on her choice: "As to tennis headgear, I have a particular dislike, although an altogether unreasonable one, for the narrow satin ribbons that some players tie about their heads. The georgette crepe of Mademoiselle Lenglen's famous bandeau is attractive as well as practical, but for myself I like an eye shade, because it protects the eyes, prevents wrinkles from forming about them, holds the hair in place and keeps away some of the sunburn."

In 1929, American Lawn Tennis magazine reported that Wills played with a Wright & Ditson Challenge Cup wooden racket weighing 13 1/4 oz (372 g) with a 5-inch (127 mm) handle. In the spring of 1931 the same magazine reported that Wills used the identical make and model of racket but with a weight of 13 1/2 oz (376 g). and a handle of 5 1/8 inch (130 mm).

== Personal life ==
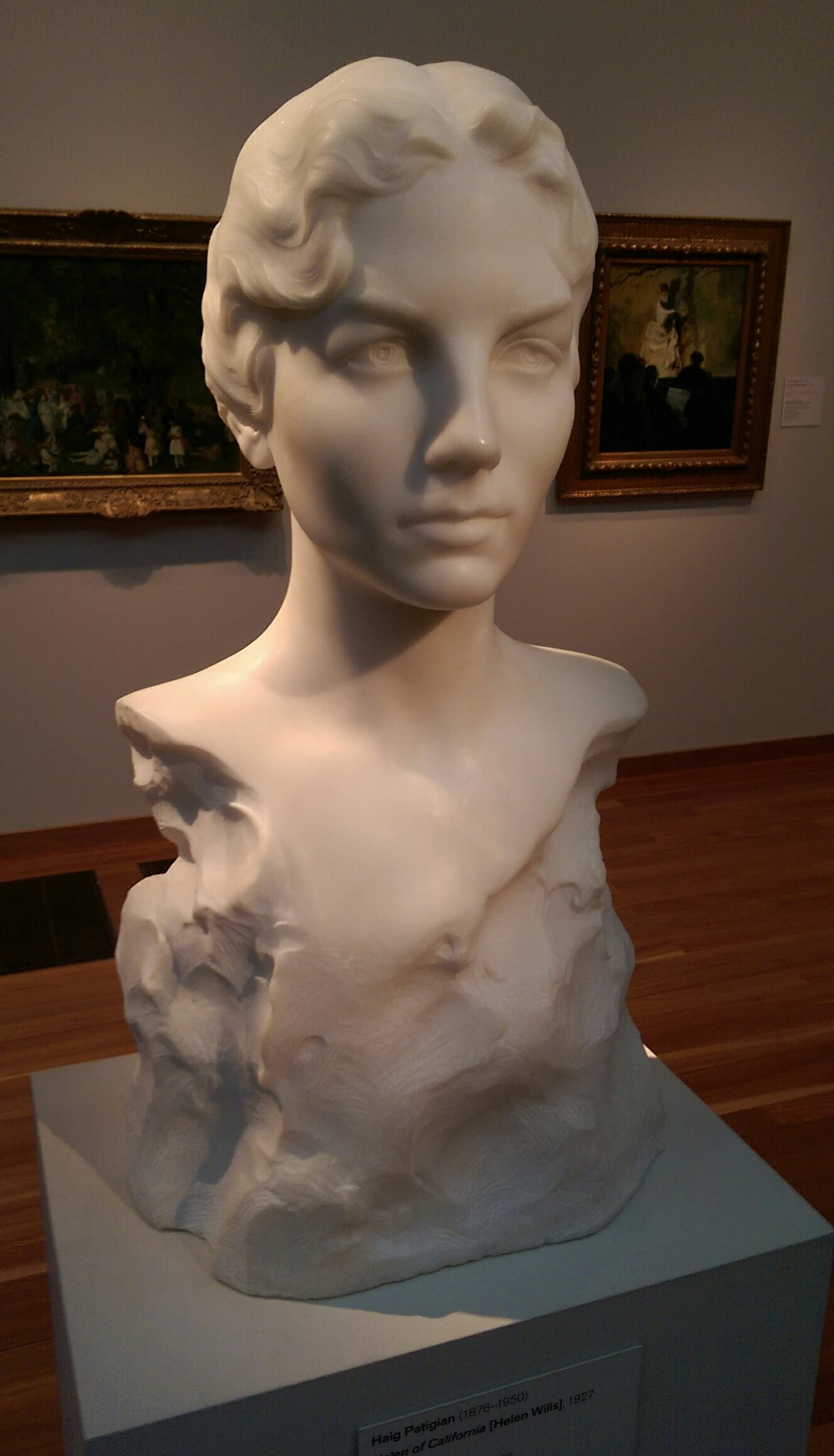
"Helen of California", a portrait sculpture by Haig Patigian, on display at the de Young Museum in San Francisco

Wills married Frederick S. Moody Jr., a San Francisco stockbroker, at the Berkeley chapel of St. Clement's Episcopal Church, on December 23, 1929. They had met in February 1926 at the Riviera after the match against Lenglen, and announced their engagement in January 1929. In marriage, she wished to retain her professional name in arts as Helen Wills. The couple settled near the Claremont Hotel and the adjoining Berkeley Tennis Club where she worked out. They lived in a "tiny apartment", according to Wills, so she kept a separate studio to practice painting and sketching. Moody was fond of squash rather than tennis, and Wills occasionally played against him for recreation. She divorced Moody in August 1937 and married Irish polo player Aidan Roark in October 1939. She did not have any children from either marriage.

Wills wrote a coaching manual, Tennis (1928), her autobiography, Fifteen-Thirty: The Story of a Tennis Player (1937), and a mystery, Death Serves an Ace (1939, with Robert Murphy). She also wrote articles for The Saturday Evening Post and other magazines.

Senator James D. Phelan befriended Wills and invited her as a frequent guest to his estate, Villa Montalvo. Wills wrote poetry as a hobby, and presented two of her works, The Awakening and The Narrow Street, to a literary competition hosted by Phelan in 1926. Wills settled laurel wreaths over the heads of the winners. Phelan himself wrote a poem dedicated to Wills. Phelan commissioned Haig Patigian, sculptor and fellow member of the Bohemian Club, to create a likeness of Wills. Patigian completed a marble bust of Wills in 1927 called Helen of California, and Phelan donated it to the M. H. de Young Memorial Museum. At his death in 1930, Phelan left Wills $20,000 ($385,458 today) in his will, "in appreciation of her winning the tennis championship for California".

Wills met painter Frida Kahlo and her husband Diego Rivera at the San Francisco studio of her friend sculptor Ralph Stackpole in 1930. Rivera sketched Wills and asked her to model as the main figure of "California" for the 30-foot-high mural Allegory of California he was painting for the City Club of the San Francisco Stock Exchange. The committee of the Stock Exchange found out that Wills was being portrayed and insisted that no living person be represented in the mural. Subsequently, Rivera darkened the hair, broadened the eyes, changed the corners of the mouth and angled the jawline to remove any specific resemblance to Wills. A portrait of Stackpole's son Peter Stackpole holding a model airplane remained unnoticed in the mural.

Wills painted all her life, giving exhibitions of her paintings and etchings in New York galleries. She personally drew all of the illustrations in her book Tennis. Her work was also part of the painting event in the art competition at the 1932 Summer Olympics. On June 17, 1929, the first exhibition of her drawings was opened at the Cooling Gallery in London.

Wills remained an avid tennis player into her 80s.

Wills died on New Year's Day 1998 at Carmel Convalescent Hospital. Her death was announced a day later. Wills bequeathed US$10 million to the University of California, Berkeley to fund the establishment of a Neuroscience institute. The resulting institute, the Helen Wills Neuroscience Institute, began in 1999 and is home to more than 70 faculty researchers and 36 graduate students.

== Career statistics ==
=== Grand Slam singles performance timeline ===
Key
W	F	SF	QF	#R	RR	Q#	DNQ	A	NH

(W) winner; (F) finalist; (SF) semifinalist; (QF) quarterfinalist; (#R) rounds 4, 3, 2, 1; (RR) round-robin stage; (Q#) qualification round; (DNQ) did not qualify; (A) absent; (NH) not held; (SR) strike rate (events won / competed); (W–L) win–loss record.

Tournament	1922	1923	1924	1925	1926	1927	1928	1929	1930	1931	1932	1933	1934	1935	1936	1937	1938	SR	W–L	Win %
Australian Championships	A	A	A	A	A	A	A	A	A	A	A	A	A	A	A	A	A	0 / 0	0–0	–
French Championships	A²	A²	A²	A	2R¹	A	W	W	W	A	W	A	A	A	A	A	A	4 / 5	20–0	100%
Wimbledon	A	A	F	A	1R¹	W	W	W	W	A	W	W	A	W	A	A	W	8 / 10	55–1	98%
U.S. National Championships	F	W	W	W	A	W	W	W	A	W	A	F	A	A	A	A	A	7 / 9	51–2	96%
Win–loss	5–1	6–0	11–1	6–0	1–0	13–0	16–0	16–0	11–0	6–0	11–0	11–1	0–0	7–0	0–0	0–0	6–0	19 / 24	126–3	98%

¹ - Wills withdrew from both the French Championships and Wimbledon Championships in 1926 after having an appendectomy. The French walkover is not counted as a loss. One week prior to Wimbledon, the tournament was informed that she would not play. She was given a default from her opening round match, which Wimbledon does not consider to be a "loss".

² - Prior to 1925, the French Championships were not open to international players.

=== Grand Slam finals ===
==== Singles: 22 (19 titles, 3 runner-ups) ====
Result	Year	Championship	Surface	Opponent	Score	Ref.
Loss	1922	U.S. Championships	Grass	(United States) Molla Mallory	3–6, 1–6	
Win	1923	U.S. Championships	Grass	(United States) Molla Mallory	6–2, 6–1	
Loss	1924	Wimbledon	Grass	(United Kingdom) Kitty McKane	6–4, 4–6, 4–6	
Win	1924	U.S. Championships (2)	Grass	(United States) Molla Mallory	6–1, 6–3	
Win	1925	U.S. Championships (3)	Grass	(United Kingdom) Kitty McKane	3–6, 6–0, 6–2	
Win	1927	Wimbledon	Grass	(Spain) Lilí de Álvarez	6–2, 6–4	
Win	1927	U.S. Championships (4)	Grass	(United Kingdom) Betty Nuthall	6–1, 6–4	
Win	1928	French Championships	Clay	(United Kingdom) Eileen Bennett	6–1, 6–2	
Win	1928	Wimbledon (2)	Grass	(Spain) Lilí de Álvarez	6–2, 6–3	
Win	1928	U.S. Championships (5)	Grass	(United States) Helen Jacobs	6–2, 6–1	
Win	1929	French Championships (2)	Clay	(France) Simonne Mathieu	6–3, 6–4	
Win	1929	Wimbledon (3)	Grass	(United States) Helen Jacobs	6–1, 6–2	
Win	1929	U.S. Championships (6)	Grass	(United Kingdom) Phoebe Holcroft Watson	6–4, 6–2	
Win	1930	French Championships (3)	Clay	(United States) Helen Jacobs	6–2, 6–1	
Win	1930	Wimbledon (4)	Grass	(United States) Elizabeth Ryan	6–2, 6–2	
Win	1931	U.S. Championships (7)	Grass	(United Kingdom) Eileen Bennett	6–4, 6–1	
Win	1932	French Championships (4)	Clay	(France) Simonne Mathieu	7–5, 6–1	
Win	1932	Wimbledon (5)	Grass	(United States) Helen Jacobs	6–3, 6–1	
Win	1933	Wimbledon (6)	Grass	(United Kingdom) Dorothy Round	6–4, 6–8, 6–3	
Loss	1933	U.S. Championships	Grass	(United States) Helen Jacobs	6–8, 6–3, 0–3, ret.	
Win	1935	Wimbledon (7)	Grass	(United States) Helen Jacobs	6–3, 3–6, 7–5	
Win	1938	Wimbledon (8)	Grass	(United States) Helen Jacobs	6–4, 6–0	

==== Doubles: 10 (9 titles, 1 runner-up) ====
Result	Year	Championship	Surface	Partner	Opponents	Score	Ref.
Win	1922	U.S. Championships	Grass	(United States) Marion Zinderstein Jessup	(United States) Molla Bjurstedt Mallory (United States) Edith Sigourney	6–4, 7–9, 6–3	
Win	1924	Wimbledon	Grass	(United States) Hazel Hotchkiss Wightman	(United Kingdom) Phyllis Howkins Covell (United Kingdom) Kitty McKane	6–4, 6–4	
Win	1924	U.S. Championships (2)	Grass	(United States) Hazel Hotchkiss Wightman	(United States) Eleanor Goss (United States) Marion Zinderstein Jessup	6–4, 6–3	
Win	1925	U.S. Championships (3)	Grass	(United States) Mary Browne	(United States) May Sutton Bundy (United States) Elizabeth Ryan	6–4, 6–3	
Win	1927	Wimbledon (2)	Grass	(United States) Elizabeth Ryan	(South Africa) Bobbie Heine (South Africa) Irene Peacock	6–3, 6–2	
Win	1928	U.S. Championships (4)	Grass	(United States) Hazel Hotchkiss Wightman	(United States) Edith Cross (United States) Anna McCune Harper	6–2, 6–2	
Win	1930	French Championships	Clay	(United States) Elizabeth Ryan	(France) Simone Barbier (France) Simonne Mathieu	6–3, 6–1	
Win	1930	Wimbledon (3)	Grass	(United States) Elizabeth Ryan	(United States) Edith Cross (United States) Sarah Palfrey	6–2, 9–7	
Win	1932	French Championships (2)	Clay	(United States) Elizabeth Ryan	(United Kingdom) Eileen Bennett Whittingstall (United Kingdom) Betty Nuthall	6–1, 6–3	
Loss	1933	U.S. Championships	Grass	(United States) Elizabeth Ryan	(United Kingdom) Freda James (United Kingdom) Betty Nuthall	default	

==== Mixed doubles: 7 (3 titles, 4 runner-ups) ====
Result	Year	Championship	Surface	Partner	Opponents	Score	Ref.
Loss	1922	U.S. Championships	Grass	(United States) Howard Kinsey	(United States) Mary Browne (United States) Bill Tilden	4–6, 3–6	
Win	1924	U.S. Championships	Grass	(United States) Vincent Richards	(United States) Molla Bjurstedt Mallory (United States) Bill Tilden	6–8, 7–5, 6–0	
Loss	1928	French Championships	Clay	(United States) Frank Hunter	(United Kingdom) Eileen Bennett (France) Henri Cochet	6–3, 3–6, 3–6	
Win	1928	U.S. Championships (2)	Grass	(Australia) John Hawkes	(United States) Edith Cross (Australia) Edgar Moon	6–1, 6–3	
Loss	1929	French Championships	Clay	(United States) Frank Hunter	(United Kingdom) Eileen Bennett (France) Henri Cochet	3–6, 2–6	
Win	1929	Wimbledon	Grass	(United States) Frank Hunter	(United Kingdom) Joan Fry (United Kingdom) Ian Collins	6–1, 6–4	
Loss	1932	French Championships	Clay	(United States) Sidney Wood	(United Kingdom) Betty Nuthall (United Kingdom) Fred Perry	4–6, 2–6	

=== Olympic Games ===
==== Singles: 1 (1 gold medal) ====
Result	Year	Tournament	Surface	Opponent	Score
Gold	1924	Summer Olympics, Paris	Clay	(France) Julie Vlasto	6–2, 6–2

==== Doubles: 1 (1 gold medal) ====
Result	Year	Tournament	Surface	Partner	Opponents	Score
Gold	1924	Summer Olympics, Paris	Clay	(United States) Hazel Wightman	(United Kingdom) Phyllis Covell (United Kingdom) Kathleen McKane	7–5, 8–6

== See also ==
- Performance timelines for all female tennis players who reached at least one Grand Slam final
- List of Grand Slam women's singles champions
- List of Grand Slam women's doubles champions
- List of Grand Slam mixed doubles champions
- List of Grand Slam related tennis records
- List of covers of Time magazine (1920s)
