= 1924 Wimbledon Championships =

- Date: 23 June – 5 July
- Edition: 44th
- Category: Grand Slam
- Surface: Grass
- Location: Church Road; SW19, Wimbledon, London, United Kingdom
- Venue: All England Lawn Tennis and Croquet Club

Champions

Men's singles
- (France) Jean Borotra

Women's singles
- (United Kingdom) Kitty McKane

Men's doubles
- (United States) Frank Hunter / (United States) Vincent Richards

Women's doubles
- (United States) Hazel Wightman / (United States) Helen Wills

Mixed doubles
- (United Kingdom) John Gilbert / (United Kingdom) Kitty McKane
- Wimbledon Championships

The 1924 Wimbledon Championships took place on the outdoor grass courts at the All England Lawn Tennis and Croquet Club in Wimbledon, London, United Kingdom. The tournament ran from 23 June until 5 July. It was the 44th staging of the Wimbledon Championships, and the second Grand Slam tennis event of 1924.

This edition saw the introduction of a draw that made use of a seeding list. The seeding was based on nationality and aimed at preventing nominated players from the same nationality meeting before the later rounds. A maximum of four players could be nominated by a country and these would be seeded into four different quarters of the draw. In 1927 the system of seeding by nationality was extended with a merit–based seeding based on the ranking of players.

== Finals ==
=== Men's singles ===
(France) Jean Borotra defeated (France) René Lacoste, 6–1, 3–6, 6–1, 3–6, 6–4

=== Women's singles ===
(United Kingdom) Kitty McKane defeated (United States) Helen Wills, 4–6, 6–4, 6–4

=== Men's doubles ===
(United States) Frank Hunter / (United States) Vincent Richards defeated (United States) Watson Washburn / (United States) R. Norris Williams, 6–3, 3–6, 8–10, 8–6, 6–3

=== Women's doubles ===
(United States) Hazel Wightman / (United States) Helen Wills defeated (United Kingdom) Phyllis Covell / (United Kingdom) Kitty McKane, 6–4, 6–4

=== Mixed doubles ===
(United Kingdom) John Gilbert / (United Kingdom) Kitty McKane defeated (United Kingdom) Leslie Godfree / (United Kingdom) Dorothy Shepherd-Barron, 6–3, 3–6, 6–3

Preceded by 1924 Australasian Championships	Grand Slams	Succeeded by 1924 U.S. National Championships
