= Elizabeth Ryan =

American tennis player

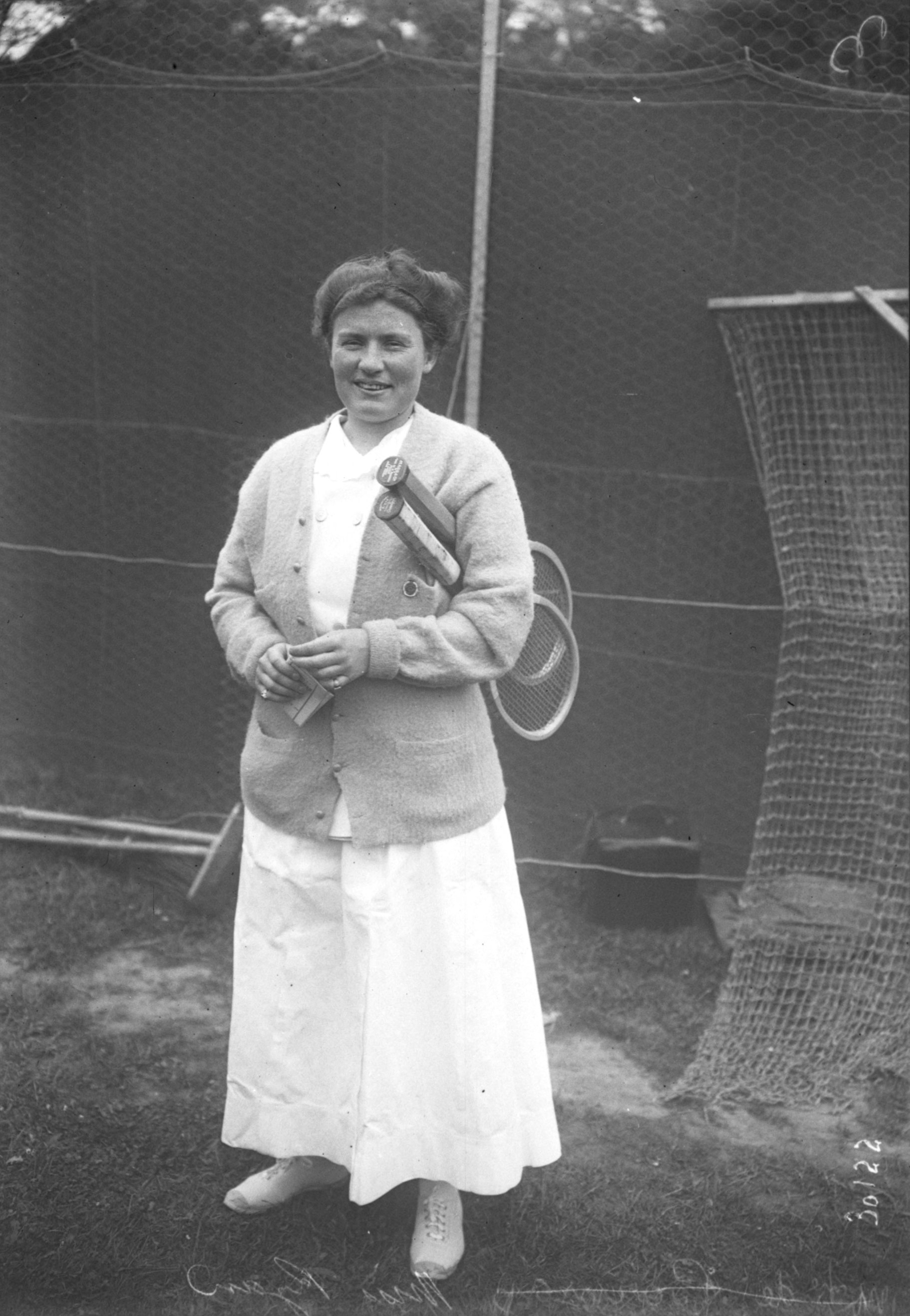
- Ryan in 1913
- Full name: Elizabeth Montague Ryan
- Country (sports): United States
- Born: February 5, 1892 Anaheim, California, U.S.
- Died: July 6, 1979 (aged 87) Wimbledon, England
- Turned pro: 1905 (amateur tour)
- Retired: 1934
- Plays: Right handed
- Int. Tennis HoF: 1972 (member page)

Singles
- Career record: 1064-94 (91.9%)
- Career titles: 244
- Highest ranking: No. 3 (1927)

Grand Slam singles results
- French Open: QF (1926, 1930, 1931)
- Wimbledon: F (1921, 1930)
- US Open: F (1926)

Other tournaments
- WHCC: F (1922)

Grand Slam doubles results
- French Open: W (1930, 1932, 1933, 1934)
- Wimbledon: W (1914, 1919, 1920, 1921, 1922, 1923, 1925, 1926, 1927, 1930, 1933, 1934)
- US Open: W (1926)

Grand Slam mixed doubles results
- French Open: F (1934)
- Wimbledon: W (1919, 1921, 1923, 1927, 1928, 1930, 1932)
- US Open: W (1926, 1933)

Elizabeth Montague Ryan (February 5, 1892 – July 6, 1979) was an American tennis player who was born in Anaheim, California, but lived most of her adult life in the United Kingdom. Ryan won 26 Grand Slam titles, 12 in women's doubles and 7 in mixed doubles at Wimbledon, an all-time record for those two events. Ryan also won four women's doubles titles at the French Championships, as well as one women's doubles title and two mixed-doubles titles at the U.S. Championships. During a 19-year run Ryan amassed a total of 659 titles in singles, doubles and mixed doubles.

== Career ==
Although she reached the Wimbledon singles finals twice, Ryan never won the title. Eight of her losses at Wimbledon were to players generally considered to be among the best ever. Ryan had to play Dorothea Lambert Chambers in the all-comers final of 1920; Suzanne Lenglen in the 1919 semifinals (losing 6–4, 7–5), 1921 final, 1922 quarterfinals, 1924 quarterfinals (losing 6–2, 6–8, 6–4), and 1925 second round; and Helen Wills Moody in the 1928 semifinals and 1930 final.

In the 1926 singles final at the U.S. Championships, the 34-year-old Ryan led 42-year-old Molla Bjurstedt Mallory 4–6, 6–4, 4–0 and had a match point at 7–6 in the third set before losing the final three games of the match.

Ryan and her longtime partner Lenglen never lost a women's doubles match at Wimbledon, going 31–0. Only Billie Jean King (224 match wins) and Martina Navratilova won more matches at Wimbledon than Ryan (190 match wins): 47–15 in singles, 73–4 in women's doubles, and 70–9 in mixed doubles.

The longtime tennis writer Ted Tinling has credited Ryan with inventing the volleying style later perfected by players such as Sarah Palfrey Cooke, Alice Marble, Louise Brough Clapp, Margaret Osborne duPont, Doris Hart, Darlene Hard, Margaret Court, Navratilova, and King. "Before World War I, women's tennis consisted primary of slogging duels from the baseline. There were a few volleying pioneers, notably ... Hazel [Hotchkiss] Wightman and Ethel [Thomson] Larcombe, but volleying as a fundamental, aggressive technique was first injected into the women's game by ... Ryan." Tinling, however, also said about Ryan, "Elizabeth wasn't fast enough for singles. Too heavy."

According to A. Wallis Myers of The Daily Telegraph and the Daily Mail, Ryan was ranked in the world top 10 from 1921 (when the rankings began) through 1928 and again in 1930, reaching a career high of world No. 3 in those rankings in 1927. Ryan was ranked second behind Mallory in the year-end rankings issued by the United States Lawn Tennis Association for 1925 and 1926.

Ryan died on July 6, 1979, at age 87 on the grounds of the All England Lawn Tennis and Croquet Club at Wimbledon, following the ladies singles final and the day before Billie Jean King broke her record number of Wimbledon wins by winning her 20th title. When tennis writer and television commentator Bud Collins tried to arrange for Ryan and King to film an interview together at Wimbledon in 1979, Ryan refused. King said "I always liked seeing Miss Ryan at Wimbledon, and I'd try to be friendly, but she didn't seem to want it. For me, it wasn't personal. Sure, I wanted the record, but I wasn't trying to steal a possession of hers." King also said "[T]here is no doubt in my mind that she just didn't want to be alive to see her record broken. She was [87], she had held it for a long, long time and she wanted it for herself. But records are there to be broken." Two years before her death, Ryan had told Ted Tinling, the tennis fashion designer, "I hope I don't live to see my record broken, but if someone is to break it, I hope it is Billie Jean. She has so much courage on the court." According to reports, Ryan became ill while watching the men's doubles final and excused herself, heading for the women's rest room. She collapsed there and was rushed to the hospital, where she died at 5:20 p.m. London time.

== Grand Slam finals ==
=== Singles: 3 (3 runner-ups) ===
Result	Year	Championship	Surface	Opponent	Score
Loss	1921	Wimbledon	Grass	(France) Suzanne Lenglen	2–6, 0–6
Loss	1926	U.S. Championships	Grass	(United States) Molla Mallory	6–4, 4–6, 7–9
Loss	1930	Wimbledon	Grass	(United States) Helen Wills	2–6, 2–6

=== Doubles: 21 (17 titles, 4 runner-ups) ===
Result	Year	Championship	Surface	Partner	Opponents	Score
Win	1914	Wimbledon	Grass	(United Kingdom) Agnes Morton	(United Kingdom) Edith Hannam (United Kingdom) Ethel Thomson Larcombe	6–1, 6–3
Win	1919	Wimbledon	Grass	(France) Suzanne Lenglen	(United Kingdom) Dorothea Lambert Chambers (United Kingdom) Ethel Thomson Larcombe	4–6, 7–5, 6–3
Win	1920	Wimbledon	Grass	(France) Suzanne Lenglen	(United Kingdom) Dorothea Lambert Chambers (United Kingdom) Ethel Thomson Larcombe	6–4, 6–0
Win	1921	Wimbledon	Grass	(France) Suzanne Lenglen	(United Kingdom) Geraldine Beamish (South Africa) Irene Bowder Peacock	6–1, 6–2
Win	1922	Wimbledon	Grass	(France) Suzanne Lenglen	(United Kingdom) Kathleen McKane Godfree (United Kingdom) Margaret McKane Stocks	6–0, 6–4
Win	1923	Wimbledon	Grass	(France) Suzanne Lenglen	(United Kingdom) Joan Austin (United Kingdom) Evelyn Colyer	6–3, 6–1
Win	1925	Wimbledon	Grass	(France) Suzanne Lenglen	(United Kingdom) Kathleen Lidderdale (United Kingdom) Mary McIlquham	6–2, 6–2
Loss	1925	U.S. Championships	Grass	(United States) May Sutton	(United States) Mary Browne (United States) Helen Wills	4–6, 3–6
Win	1926	Wimbledon	Grass	(United States) Mary Browne	(United Kingdom) Evelyn Colyer (United Kingdom) Kathleen McKane Godfree	6–1, 6–1
Win	1926	U.S. Championships	Grass	(United States) Eleanor Goss	(United States) Mary Browne (United States) Charlotte Hosmer Chapin	3–6, 6–4, 12–10
Win	1927	Wimbledon	Grass	(United States) Helen Wills	(South Africa) Bobbie Heine (South Africa) Irene Bowder Peacock	6–3, 6–2
Win	1930	French Championships	Clay	(United States) Helen Wills	(France) Simone Barbier (France) Simonne Mathieu	6–3, 6–1
Win	1930	Wimbledon	Grass	(United States) Helen Wills	(United Kingdom) Edith Cross (United States) Sarah Palfrey	6–2, 9–7
Loss	1931	French Championships	Clay	(Germany) Cilly Aussem	(United Kingdom) Eileen Bennett Whittingstall (United Kingdom) Betty Nuthall	7–9, 2–6
Win	1932	French Championships	Clay	(United States) Helen Wills	(United Kingdom) Eileen Bennett Whittingstall (United Kingdom) Betty Nuthall	6–1, 6–3
Loss	1932	Wimbledon	Grass	(United States) Helen Jacobs	(France) Doris Metaxa (Belgium) Josane Sigart	4–6, 3–6
Win	1933	French Championships	Clay	(France) Simonne Mathieu	(France) Sylvie Jung Henrotin (France) Colette Rosambert	6–1, 6–3
Win	1933	Wimbledon	Grass	(France) Simonne Mathieu	(United Kingdom) Freda James (United Kingdom) Billie Yorke	6–2, 9–11, 6–4
Loss	1933	U.S. Championships	Grass	(United States) Helen Wills	(United Kingdom) Freda James (United Kingdom) Betty Nuthall	default
Win	1934	French Championships	Clay	(France) Simonne Mathieu	(United States) Helen Jacobs (United States) Sarah Palfrey	3–6, 6–4, 6–2
Win	1934	Wimbledon	Grass	(France) Simonne Mathieu	(United Kingdom) Dorothy Andrus (France) Sylvie Jung Henrotin	6–3, 6–3

=== Mixed doubles: 14 (9 titles, 5 runner-ups) ===
Result	Year	Championship	Surface	Partner	Opponents	Score
Win	1919	Wimbledon	Grass	(United Kingdom) Randolph Lycett	(United Kingdom) Dorothea Chambers (United Kingdom) Albert Prebble	6–0, 6–0
Loss	1920	Wimbledon	Grass	(United Kingdom) Randolph Lycett	(France) Suzanne Lenglen (Australia) Gerald Patterson	5–7, 3–6
Win	1921	Wimbledon	Grass	(United Kingdom) Randolph Lycett	(United Kingdom) Phyllis Howkins (United Kingdom) Max Woosnam	6–3, 6–1
Loss	1922	Wimbledon	Grass	(United Kingdom) Randolph Lycett	(France) Suzanne Lenglen (Australia) Pat O'Hara Wood	4–6, 3–6
Win	1923	Wimbledon	Grass	(United Kingdom) Randolph Lycett	(United Kingdom) Dorothy Shepherd-Barron (British Raj) Lewis Deane	6–4, 7–5
Loss	1925	Wimbledon	Grass	(Italy) Umberto de Morpurgo	(France) Suzanne Lenglen (France) Jean Borotra	3–6, 3–6
Win	1926	U.S. Championships	Grass	(France) Jean Borotra	(United States) Hazel Hotchkiss Wightman (France) René Lacoste	6–4, 7–5
Win	1927	Wimbledon	Grass	(United States) Frank Hunter	(United Kingdom) Kathleen McKane Godfree (United Kingdom) Leslie Godfree	8–6, 6–0
Win	1928	Wimbledon	Grass	(South Africa) Patrick Spence	(Australia) Daphne Akhurst (Australia) Jack Crawford	7–5, 6–4
Win	1930	Wimbledon	Grass	(Australia) Jack Crawford	(Germany) Hilde Krahwinkel (Germany) Daniel Prenn	6–1, 6–3
Win	1932	Wimbledon	Grass	(Spain) Enrique Maier	(Belgium) Josane Sigart (Australia) Harry Hopman	7–5, 6–2
Win	1933	U.S. Championships	Grass	(United States) Ellsworth Vines	(United States) Sarah Palfrey (United States) George Lott	11–9, 6–1
Loss	1934	French Championships	Clay	(Australia) Adrian Quist	(France) Colette Rosambert (France) Jean Borotra	2–6, 4–6
Loss	1934	U.S. Championships	Grass	(United States) Lester Stoefen	(United States) Helen Jacobs (United States) George Lott	6–4, 11–13, 2–6

== Grand Slam tournament timelines ==
Key
W	F	SF	QF	#R	RR	Q#	DNQ	A	NH

(W) winner; (F) finalist; (SF) semifinalist; (QF) quarterfinalist; (#R) rounds 4, 3, 2, 1; (RR) round-robin stage; (Q#) qualification round; (DNQ) did not qualify; (A) absent; (NH) not held; (SR) strike rate (events won / competed); (W–L) win–loss record.

=== Singles ===
Tournament	1912	1913	1914	1915	1916	1917	1918	1919	1920	1921	1922	1923	1924	1925	1926	1927	1928	1929	1930	1931	1932	1933	1934	Career SR
Australian Open	NH	NH	NH	NH	NH	NH	NH	NH	NH	NH	A	A	A	A	A	A	A	A	A	A	A	A	A	0 / 0
French Championships (Note: Through 1923, the French Championships were open only to French nationals. The World Hard Court Championships (WHCC), actually played on clay in Paris or Brussels, began in 1912 and were open to all nationalities. The results from that tournament are shown here from 1912 through 1914 and from 1920 through 1923. The Olympics replaced the WHCC in 1924, as the Olympics were held in Paris. Beginning in 1925, the French Championships were open to all nationalities, with the results shown here beginning with that year.)	A	A	A	NH	NH	NH	NH	NH	A	A	A	A	NH	A	QF	A	A	A	QF	QF	1R	1R	1R	0 / 7
Wimbledon	QF	1R	ACF	NH	NH	NH	NH	SF	ACF	F	QF	SF	QF	2R	3R	SF	SF	3R	F	A	1R^{1}	A	A	0 / 16
U.S. Championships	A	A	A	A	A	A	A	A	A	A	A	A	A	QF	F	A	A	A	A	A	A	A	QF	0 / 3
SR	0 / 1	0 / 1	0 / 1	0 / 0	0 / 0	0 / 0	0 / 0	0 / 1	0 / 1	0 / 1	0 / 2	0 / 1	0 / 1	0 / 2	0 / 3	0 / 1	0 / 1	0 / 1	0 / 2	0 / 1	0 / 2	0 / 1	0 / 2	0 / 26

ACF = All comers final, with the winner to play the defending champion.

^{1} Ryan did not play. Her opponent got a walkover.

=== Doubles ===
Tournament	1912	1913	1914	1915	1916	1917	1918	1919	1920	1921	1922	1923	1924	1925	1926	1927	1928	1929	1930	1931	1932	1933	1934	Career SR
Australian Open	NH	NH	NH	NH	NH	NH	NH	NH	NH	NH	A	A	A	A	A	A	A	A	A	A	A	A	A	0 / 0
French Championships	A	NH	NH	NH	NH	NH	NH	NH	A	A	NH	A	NH	A	SF	A	A	A	W	F	W	W	W	4 / 6
Wimbledon	NH	2R	W	NH	NH	NH	NH	W	W	W	W	W	QF	W	W	W	SF	SF	W	A	F	W	W	12 / 16
U.S. Championships	A	A	A	A	A	A	A	A	A	A	A	A	A	F	W	A	A	A	A	A	A	F	SF	1 / 4
SR	0 / 0	0 / 0	1 / 1	0 / 0	0 / 0	0 / 0	0 / 0	1 / 1	1 / 1	1 / 1	1 / 1	1 / 1	0 / 1	1 / 2	2 / 3	1 / 1	0 / 1	0 / 1	2 / 2	0 / 1	1 / 2	2 / 3	2 / 3	17 / 26

=== Mixed doubles ===
Tournament	1912	1913	1914	1915	1916	1917	1918	1919	1920	1921	1922	1923	1924	1925	1926	1927	1928	1929	1930	1931	1932	1933	1934	Career SR
Australian Open	NH	NH	NH	NH	NH	NH	NH	NH	NH	NH	A	A	A	A	A	A	A	A	A	A	A	A	A	0 / 0
French Championships	A	A	A	NH	NH	NH	NH	NH	?	?	?	?	NH	?	?	?	?	?	?	?	?	?	F	0 / 1
Wimbledon	NH	?	?	NH	NH	NH	NH	W	F	W	F	W	2R	F	SF	W	W	SF	W	A	W	QF	QF	7 / 15
U.S. Championships	?	A	A	?	?	?	?	?	?	?	?	?	?	?	W	?	?	?	?	?	?	W	F	2 / 3
SR	0 / 0	0 / 0	0 / 0	0 / 0	0 / 0	0 / 0	0 / 0	1 / 1	0 / 1	1 / 1	0 / 1	1 / 1	0 / 1	0 / 1	1 / 2	1 / 1	1 / 1	0 / 1	1 / 1	0 / 0	1 / 1	1 / 2	0 / 3	9 / 19

== World Championship finals ==
=== Singles: 1 final (1 runner up) ===
Result	Year	Championship	Surface	Opponent	Score
Loss	1922	World Hard Court Championships	Clay	(France) Suzanne Lenglen	3–6, 2–6

=== Doubles: 2 finals (2 titles) ===
Result	Year	Championship	Surface	Partner	Opponents	Score
Win	1914	World Hard Court Championships	Clay	(France) Suzanne Lenglen	(France) Blanche Amblard (France) Suzanne Amblard	6–0, 6–0
Win	1922	World Hard Court Championships	Clay	(France) Suzanne Lenglen	(United Kingdom) Winifred Beamish (United Kingdom) Kitty McKane	6–0, 6–4

=== Mixed doubles: 2 finals(2 titles) ===
Result	Year	Championship	Surface	Partner	Opponents	Score
Win	1913	World Hard Court Championships	Clay	(France) Max Decugis	(New Zealand) Anthony Wilding (France) Germaine Golding	walkover
Win	1914	World Hard Court Championships	Clay	(France) Max Decugis	(Austria) Ludwig von Salm-Hoogstraeten (France) Suzanne Lenglen	6–3, 6–1

== See also ==
- Performance timelines for all female tennis since 1978 players who reached at least one Grand Slam or Olympic singles final
