= Doris Metaxa =

French tennis player (1911–2007)

Doris (Doë) Metaxa
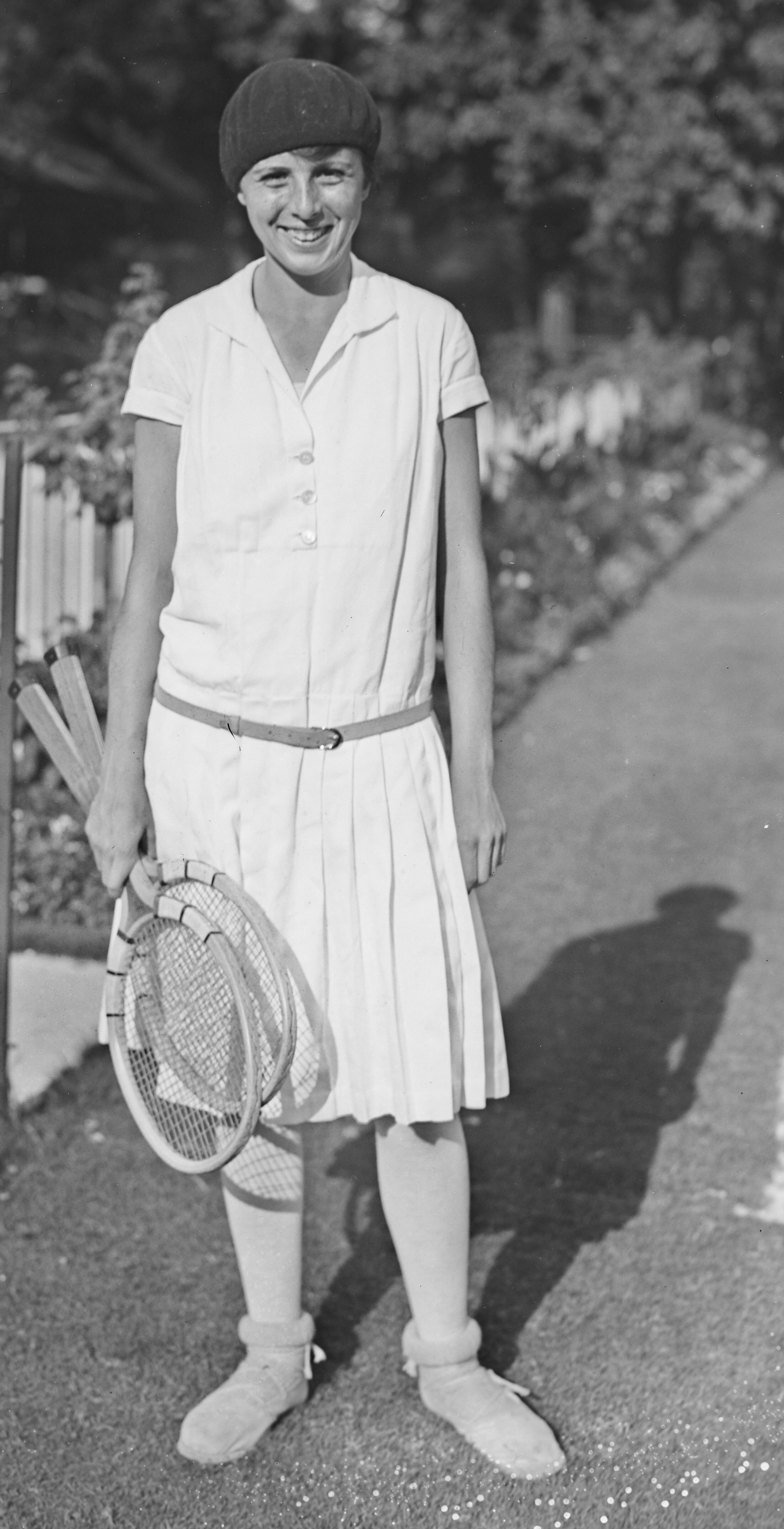
- Doris Metaxa (1928)
- Full name: Doris Emilie Metaxa Howard
- Country (sports): France
- Born: 12 June 1911 Greece
- Died: 7 September 2007 (aged 96)

Grand Slam singles results
- French Open: 3R (1931, 1932)
- Wimbledon: 4R (1932)

Grand Slam doubles results
- French Open: QF (1931, 1934)
- Wimbledon: W (1932)

Grand Slam mixed doubles results
- French Open: 1R (1929, 1930)
- Wimbledon: QF (1934)

Doris Metaxa Howard (née Metaxa; 12 June 1911 – 7 September 2007) was a Franco-Greek tennis player of the 1930s. Born in Greece, she was raised in Marseille, France.

Metaxa won the junior championships of France in 1927 and 1928. She was a member of Racing Club de France.

In 1932, she won Wimbledon title in the women's doubles with Belgian Josane Sigart against Elizabeth Ryan and Helen Jacobs, one year after a finals defeat with the same partner.

Two weeks after this victory, she married the British rugby player Peter Dunsmore Howard. They had three children, including Philip Howard, a journalist who worked for The Times.

== Grand Slam finals ==
=== Doubles: 2 (1 title, 1 runner-up) ===
Result	Year	Championship	Surface	Partner	Opponents	Score
Loss	1931	Wimbledon	Grass	(Belgium) Josane Sigart	(United Kingdom) Phyllis King (United Kingdom) Dorothy Shepherd	6–3, 3–6, 4–6
Win	1932	Wimbledon	Grass	(Belgium) Josane Sigart	(United States) Elizabeth Ryan (United States) Helen Jacobs	6–4, 6–3
