= 1932 Wimbledon Championships =

- Date: 20 June – 2 July
- Edition: 52nd
- Category: Grand Slam
- Surface: Grass
- Location: Church Road; SW19, Wimbledon, London, United Kingdom
- Venue: All England Lawn Tennis and Croquet Club

Champions

Men's singles
- (United States) Ellsworth Vines

Women's singles
- (United States) Helen Moody

Men's doubles
- (France) Jean Borotra / (France) Jacques Brugnon

Women's doubles
- (France) Doris Metaxa / (Belgium) Josane Sigart

Mixed doubles
- (Spain) Enrique Maier / (United States) Elizabeth Ryan
← 1931 ·	Wimbledon Championships	· 1933 →

The 1932 Wimbledon Championships took place on the outdoor grass courts at the All England Lawn Tennis and Croquet Club in Wimbledon, London, United Kingdom. The tournament was held from Monday 20 June until Saturday 2 July 1932. It was the 52nd staging of the Wimbledon Championships, and the third Grand Slam tennis event of 1932. Ellsworth Vines and Helen Moody won the singles titles.

== Finals ==
=== Men's singles ===
(United States) Ellsworth Vines defeated (United Kingdom) Bunny Austin, 6–4, 6–2, 6–0

=== Women's singles ===
(United States) Helen Moody defeated (United States) Helen Jacobs, 6–3, 6–1

=== Men's doubles ===
(France) Jean Borotra / (France) Jacques Brugnon defeated (United Kingdom) Pat Hughes / (United Kingdom) Fred Perry, 6–0, 4–6, 3–6, 7–5, 7–5

=== Women's doubles ===
(France) Doris Metaxa / (Belgium) Josane Sigart defeated (United States) Helen Jacobs / (United States) Elizabeth Ryan, 6–4, 6–3

=== Mixed doubles ===
(Spain) Enrique Maier / (United States) Elizabeth Ryan defeated (Australia) Harry Hopman / (Belgium) Josane Sigart, 7–5, 6–2

Preceded by 1932 French Championships	Grand Slams	Succeeded by 1932 U.S. National Championships
