= Josane Sigart =

Belgian tennis player (1909–1999

- Country (sports): Belgium
- Born: 7 January 1909 Brussels, Belgium
- Died: 20 August 1999 (aged 90)

Singles
- Highest ranking: No. 10 (1932)

Doubles

Grand Slam doubles results
- Wimbledon: W (1932)

Grand Slam mixed doubles results
- Wimbledon: F (1932)

Josane Sigart (French pronunciation: [ʒɔzan siɡaʁ]; 7 January 1909 – 20 August 1999) was a Belgian tennis player who was active in the 1930s. In 1928, she won the singles title at the Belgian Championships and would repeat this success in 1929, 1931, 1932, 1936 and 1946. In 1932, she won the Wimbledon Championships in woman's doubles with the Doris Metaxa and reached the mixed-doubles final with Harry Hopman. This made her the first Belgian winner of any Grand Slam title and she remained the sole Belgian to do so for over 70 years until Justine Henin won the women’s singles at the 2003 French Open.

In 1932, she was ranked world No. 10 by A. Wallis Myers.

== Grand Slam finals ==
=== Doubles: 2 (1 title, 1 runner-up) ===
Result	Year	Championship	Surface	Partner	Opponents	Score
Loss	1931	Wimbledon Championships	Grass	(France) Doris Metaxa	(United Kingdom) Phyllis Mudford King (United Kingdom) Dorothy Shepherd Barron	6–3, 3–6, 4–6
Win	1932	Wimbledon Championships	Grass	(France) Doris Metaxa	(United States) Elizabeth Ryan (United States) Helen Jacobs	6–4, 6–3

=== Mixed doubles: 1 (1 runner-up) ===
Result	Year	Championship	Surface	Partner	Opponents	Score
Loss	1932	Wimbledon Championships	Grass	(Australia) Harry Hopman	(United States) Elizabeth Ryan (Spain) Enrique Maier	5–7, 2–6
