= Phyllis Covell =

British tennis player

- Full name: Phyllis Lindrea Covell
- Country (sports): Great Britain
- Born: 22 May 1895; London, England
- Died: 28 October 1982 (aged 87); Heyshott, England

Singles

Grand Slam singles results
- Wimbledon: QF (1921)
- US Open: QF (1923)

Doubles

Grand Slam doubles results
- Wimbledon: F (1924, 1929)
- US Open: W (1923)

Other doubles tournaments
- WCCC: F (1919)

Grand Slam mixed doubles results
- Wimbledon: F (1921)
- US Open: F (1929)

Team competitions
- Wightman Cup: W (1924)
Medal record
Olympic Games – Tennis
Silver medal – second place	1924 Paris	Doubles

Phyllis Lindrea Covell (née Howkins. 22 May 1895 – 28 October 1982) was a female tennis player from Great Britain.

She is best remembered for her silver medal at the Paris Olympics of 1924 in the women's doubles event partnering with Kitty McKane. In 1923 she won the women's doubles title at the U.S. National Championships with McKane defeating the American pairing of Hazel Hotchkiss Wightman and Eleanor Goss in three sets. She was also a runner-up in the mixed doubles event at Wimbledon in 1921, partnering Max Woosnam. In 1924 she was part of the British Wightman Cup team who defeated the United States 6–1 at Wimbledon. Covell won both her singles matches against Helen Wills and Molla Mallory.

== Personal life ==
Phyllis Howkins married Beverley Carthew Covell on 23 September 1921 in Bombay.

== Grand Slam finals ==
=== Doubles: 4 (1 titles, 3 runners-up) ===
Result	Year	Championship	Surface	Partner	Opponents	Score
Win	1923	U.S. Championships	Grass	(United Kingdom) Kitty McKane	(United States) Hazel Hotchkiss (United States) Eleanor Goss	2–6, 6–2, 6–1
Loss	1924	Wimbledon	Grass	(United Kingdom) Kitty McKane	(United States) Hazel Hotchkiss (United States) Helen Wills	4–6, 4–6
Loss	1929	Wimbledon	Grass	(United Kingdom) Dorothy Shepherd	(United Kingdom) Peggy Saunders (United Kingdom) Phoebe Holcroft	4–6, 6–8
Loss	1929	U.S. Championships	Grass	(United Kingdom) Dorothy Shepherd	(United Kingdom) Peggy Saunders (United Kingdom) Phoebe Holcroft	6–2, 3–6, 4–6

=== Mixed doubles: 2 (0 titles, 2 runners-up) ===
Result	Year	Championship	Surface	Partner	Opponents	Score
Loss	1921	Wimbledon	Grass	(United Kingdom) Max Woosnam	(United States) Elizabeth Ryan (United Kingdom) Randolph Lycett	3–6, 1–6
Loss	1929	U.S. Championships	Grass	(United Kingdom) Bunny Austin	(United Kingdom) Betty Nuthall (United States) George Lott	3–6, 3–6

== World Championships finals ==
=== Doubles (1 runner-up) ===
Result	Year	Championship	Surface	Partner	Opponents	Score
Loss	1919	World Covered Court Championships	Wood	(United Kingdom) Dorothy Holman	(United Kingdom) Winifred Beamish (United Kingdom) Kitty McKane	3–6, 4–6
