= Eleanor Goss =

American tennis player

- Full name: Eleanor Goss-Lanning
- Country (sports): United States
- Born: November 18, 1895; New York, New York, U.S.
- Died: November 6, 1982 (aged 86); Salisbury, Connecticut, U.S.
- Plays: Right-handed

Singles

Grand Slam singles results
- US Open: F (1918)

Doubles

Grand Slam doubles results
- US Open: W (1918, 1919, 1920, 1926)

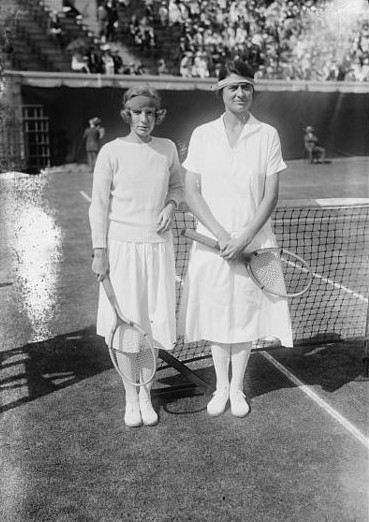
Martha Bayard and Eleanor Goss (right)

Eleanor Goss (November 18, 1895 – November 6, 1982) was an American tennis player of the inter-war period. She first drew attention in tennis by winning titles as a student at Wellesley College. She won the US Women's National Championship in women's doubles four times, including three consecutive titles between 1918 and 1920 with Marion Zinderstein.

In 1918, she also reached the women's singles final, where she was beaten by Molla Bjurstedt, and competed at the 1924 Summer Olympics.

== Grand Slam finals ==
=== Singles (1 runner-up) ===
Result	Year	Championship	Surface	Opponent	Score
Loss	1918	US National Championships	Grass	(Norway) Molla Bjurstedt	4–6, 3–6

=== Doubles (4 titles, 2 runners-up) ===
Result	Year	Championship	Surface	Partner	Opponents	Score
Win	1918	US National Championships	Grass	(United States) Marion Zinderstein	(Norway) Molla Bjurstedt (Norway) Mrs. Johan Rogge	7–5, 8–6
Win	1919	US National Championships	Grass	(United States) Marion Zinderstein	(United States) Eleonora Sears (United States) Hazel Hotchkiss	10–8, 9–7
Win	1920	US National Championships	Grass	(United States) Marion Zinderstein	(United States) Eleanor Tennant (United States) Helen Baker	6–3, 6–1
Loss	1923	US National Championships	Grass	(United States) Hazel Hotchkiss	(United Kingdom) Kathleen McKane (United Kingdom) Phyllis Covell	6–2, 2–6, 1–6
Loss	1924	US National Championships	Grass	(United States) Marion Zinderstein	(United States) Hazel Hotchkiss (United States) Helen Wills	4–6, 3–6
Win	1926	US National Championships	Grass	(United States) Elizabeth Ryan	(United States) Mary Kendall Browne (United States) Charlotte Hosmer Chapin	3–6, 6–4, 12–10
