= 1906 in tennis =

This page covers all the important events in the sport of tennis in 1906. It provides the results of notable tournaments throughout the year on both the men's and women's ILTF tennis circuits.

== Australian Open ==
Category	Champion(s)	Finalist(s)	Score
Singles	(New Zealand) Anthony Wilding	(New Zealand) Francis Fisher	6–0, 6–4, 6–4.
Doubles	(Australia) Rodney Heath (New Zealand) Anthony Wilding	(Australia) Cecil C. Cox (New Zealand) Harry Parker	6–2, 6–4, 6–2.

== French Open ==
Not a Grand Slam event.

== Wimbledon ==
Category	Champion(s)	Finalist(s)	Score
Men's singles	(United Kingdom of Great Britain and Ireland) Laurence Doherty	(United Kingdom of Great Britain and Ireland) Frank Riseley	6–4, 4–6, 6–2, 6–3
Women's singles	(United Kingdom of Great Britain and Ireland) Dorothea Douglass	(United States) May Sutton	6–3, 9–7
Men's doubles	(United Kingdom of Great Britain and Ireland) Frank Riseley (United Kingdom of Great Britain and Ireland) Sydney Smith	(United Kingdom of Great Britain and Ireland) Laurence Doherty (United Kingdom of Great Britain and Ireland) Reginald Doherty	6–8, 6–4, 5–7, 6–3, 6–3

== US Open ==
Category	Champion(s)	Finalist(s)	Score
Men's singles	(United States) William Clothier	(United States) Beals Wright	6–3, 6–0, 6–4
Women's singles	(United States) Helen Homans	(United States) Maud Barger-Wallach	6–4, 6–3
Men's doubles	(United States) Holcombe Ward (United States) Beals Wright	(United States) Fred Alexander (United States) Harold Hackett	6–3, 3–6, 6–3, 6–3
Women's doubles	(United States) Ann Burdette Coe (United States) Ethel Bliss Platt	(United States) Helen Homans (United States) Clover Boldt	6–4, 6–4
Mixed doubles	(United States) Sarah Coffin (Australia) Edward Dewhurst	(United States) Margaret Johnson (United States) J.B. Johnson	6–3, 7–5
