= List of Grand Slam women's doubles champions =

List of women's doubles Grand Slam tennis tournament champions:

The only team to complete the Grand Slam are Martina Navratilova and Pam Shriver in 1984, and their eight consecutive major win-streak remains the all-time record. Maria Bueno in 1960 and Martina Hingis in 1998 also won the Grand Slam, though with multiple partners.

Seven players have completed a Career Golden Slam by winning an Olympic gold medal and all four majors during their respective careers: Venus Williams and Serena Williams while paired together, Barbora Krejčíková and Kateřina Siniaková as a team, and individually Pam Shriver, Sara Errani and Gigi Fernández. Shriver, Fernandez (twice), Krejčíková and Siniaková also achieved the Career Super Slam, by achieving a Career Golden Slam and winning a Year-End Championship in their careers.

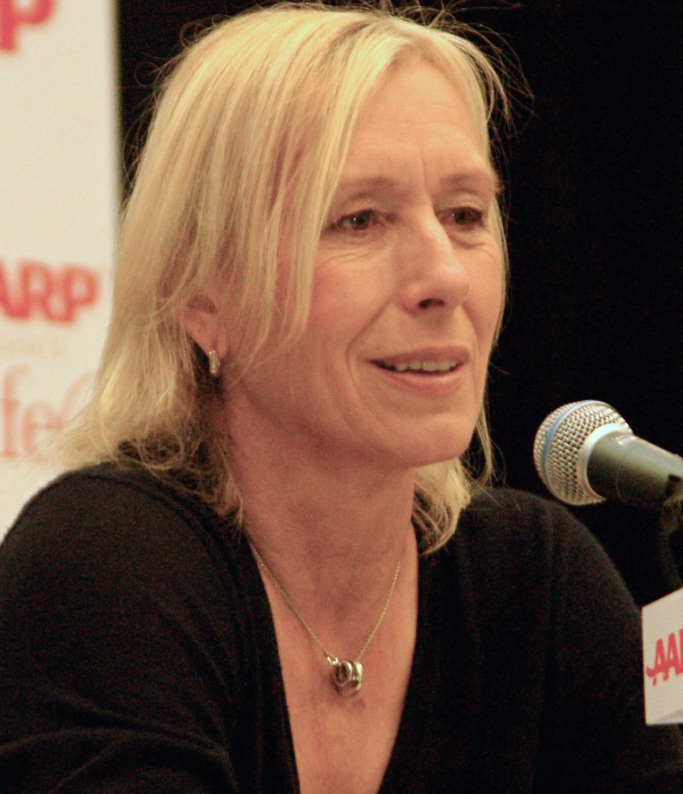
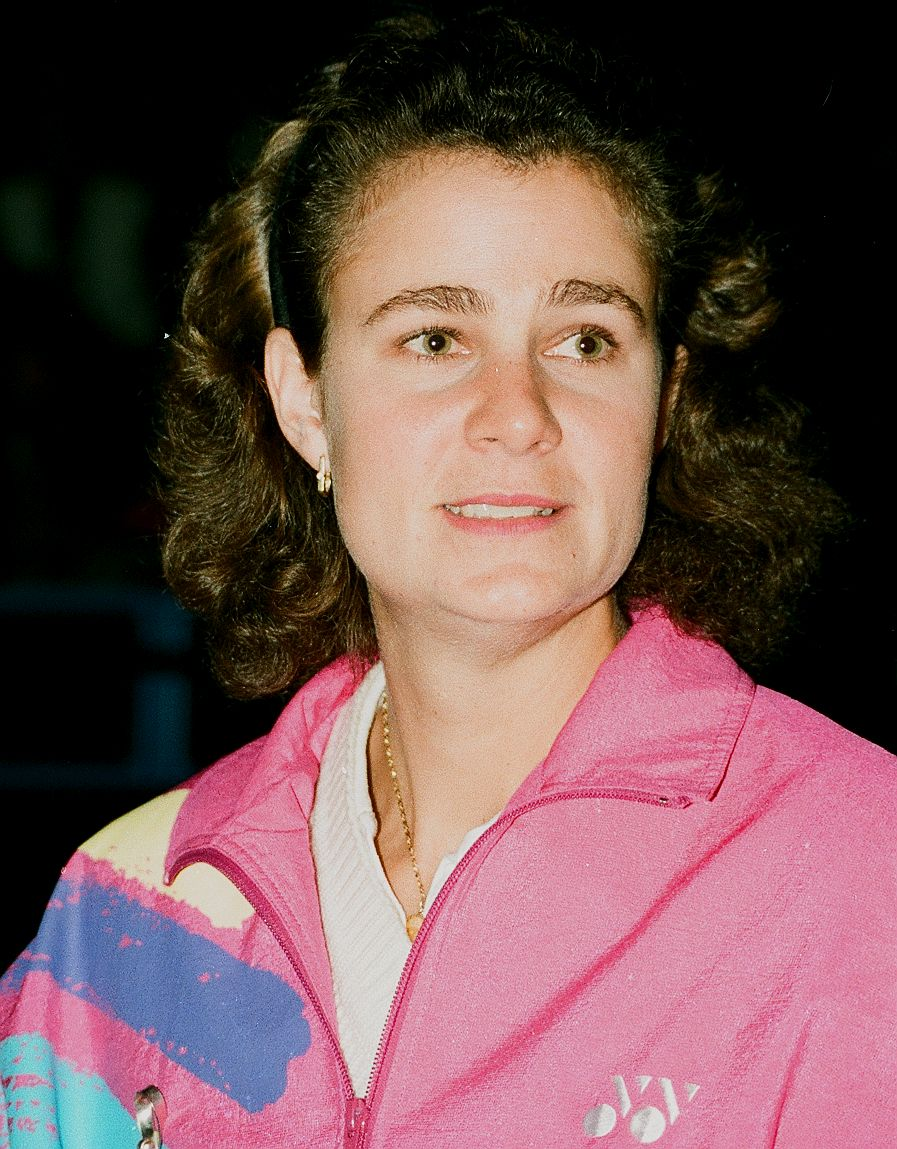
Martina Navratilova and Pam Shriver, who won a record eight consecutive major titles together.

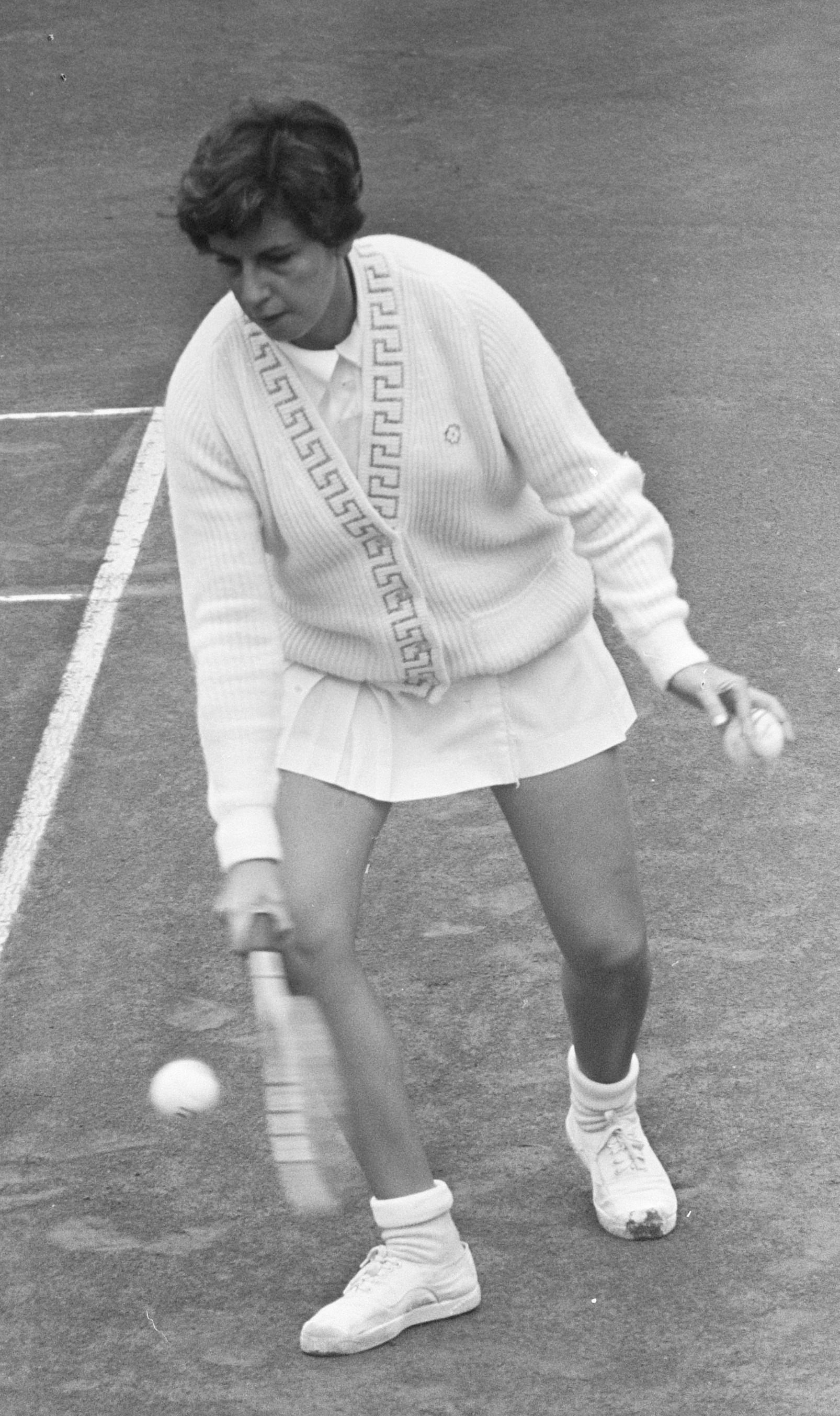
Maria Bueno, the first player to complete the Grand Slam.

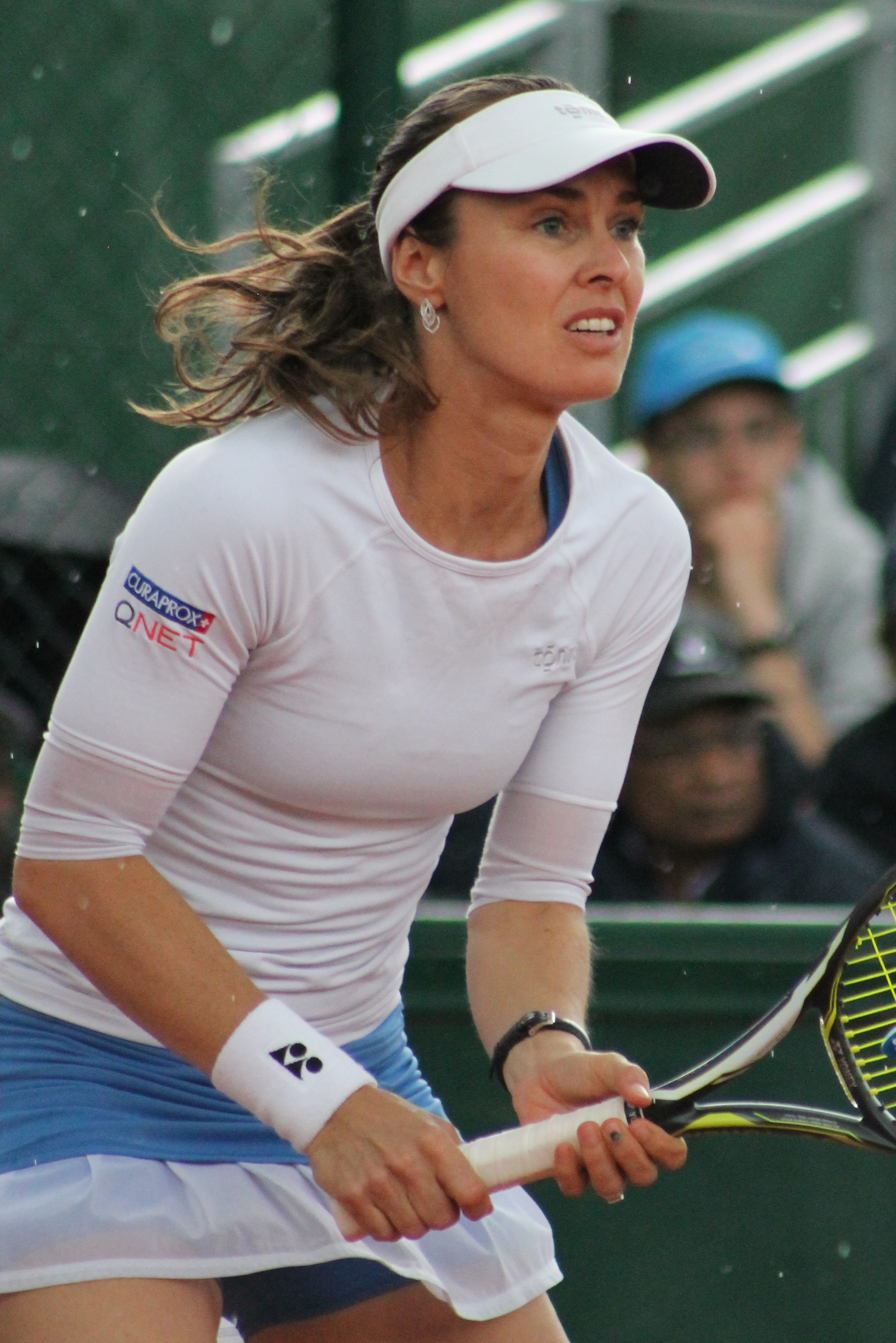
Martina Hingis, the most recent player to complete the Grand Slam.

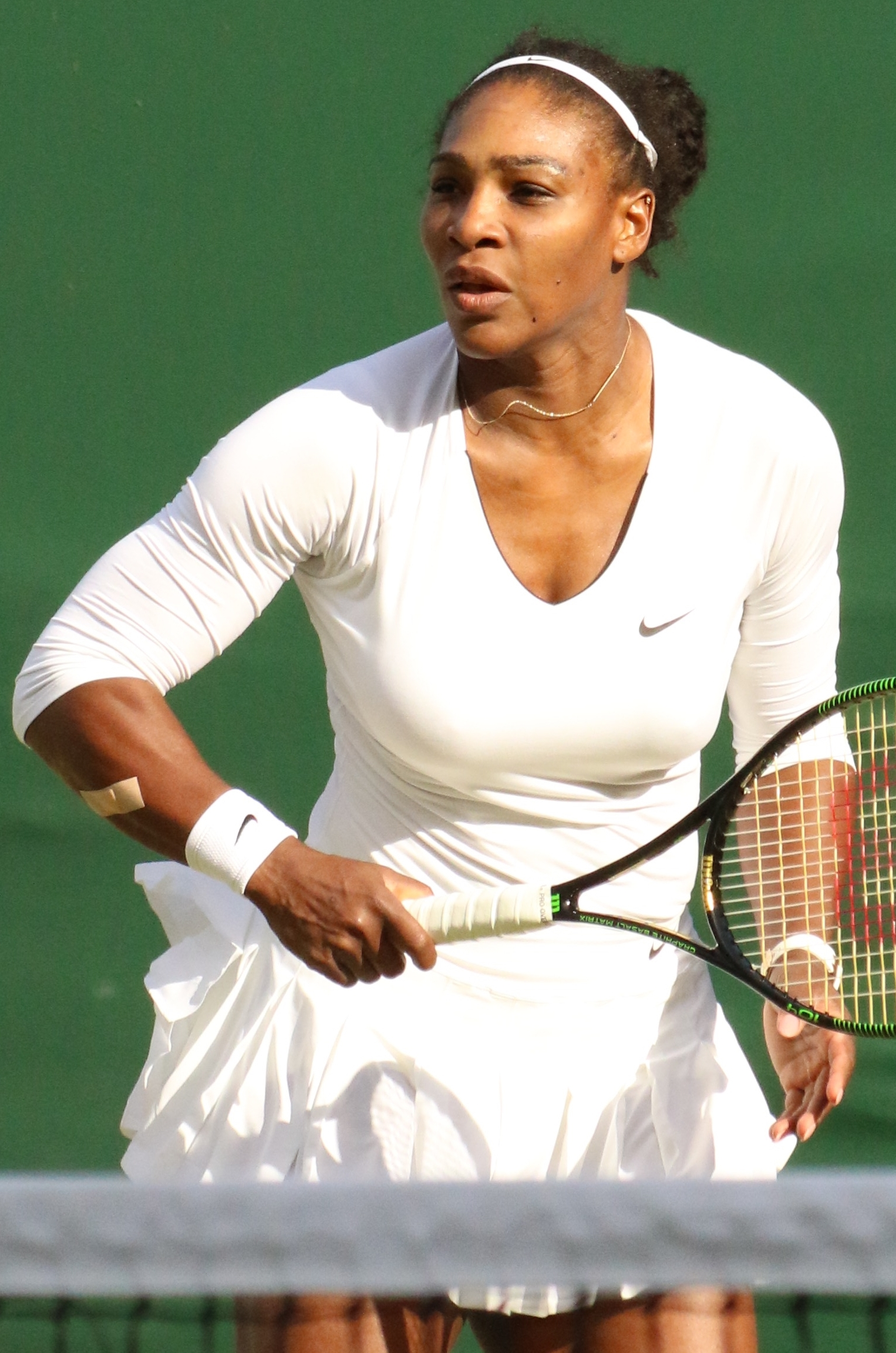
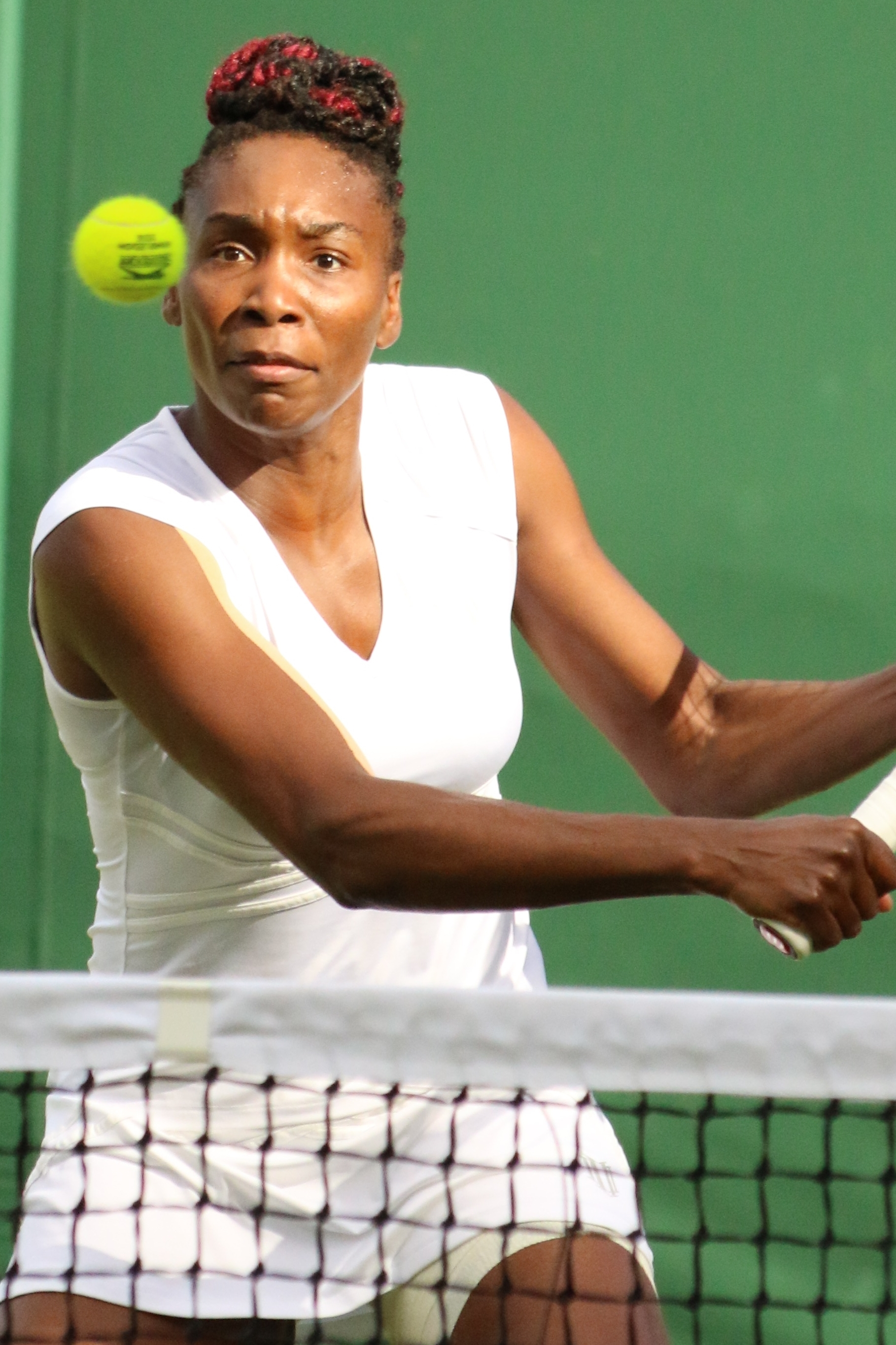
Serena and Venus Williams, the first team to complete the Career Golden Slam.
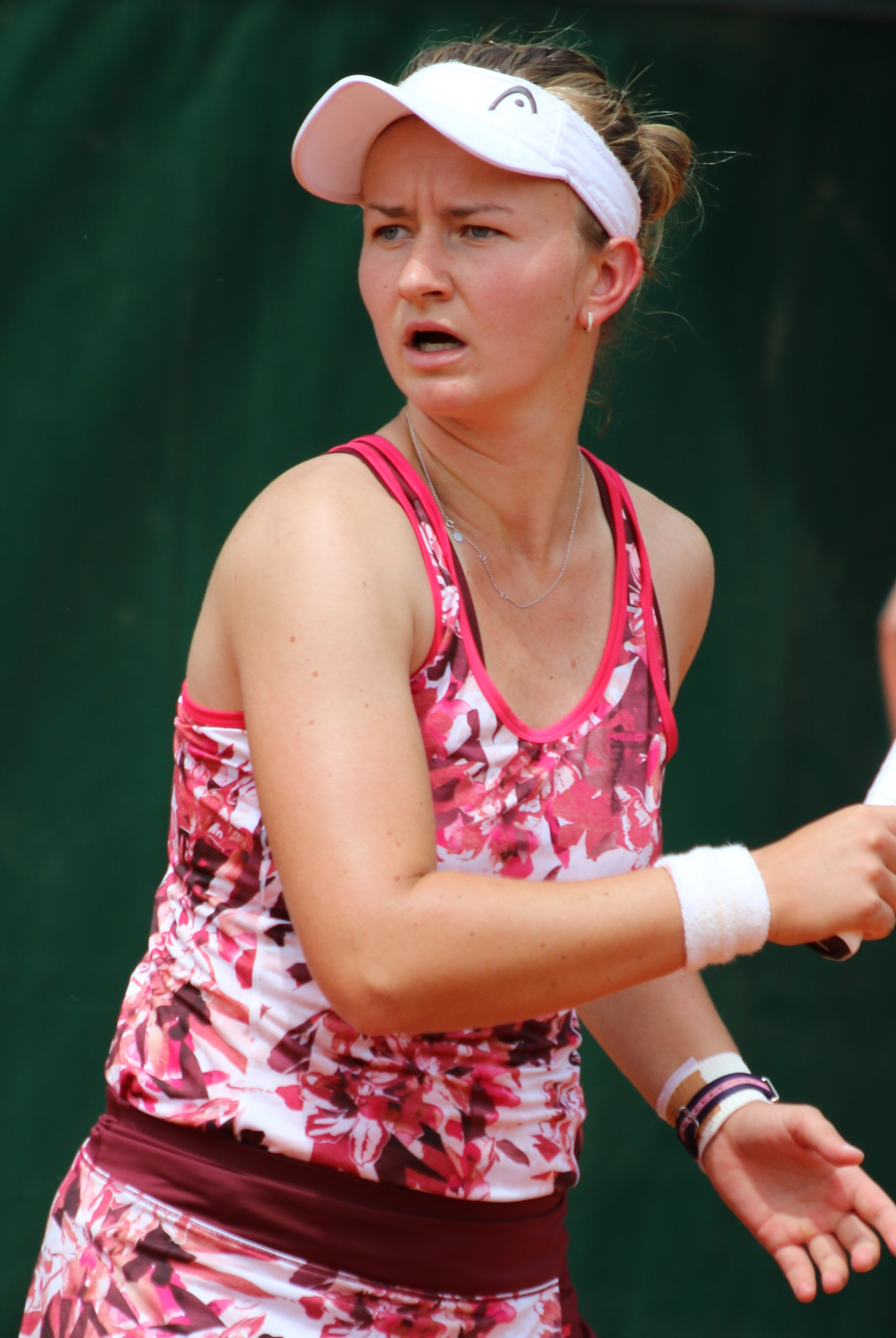
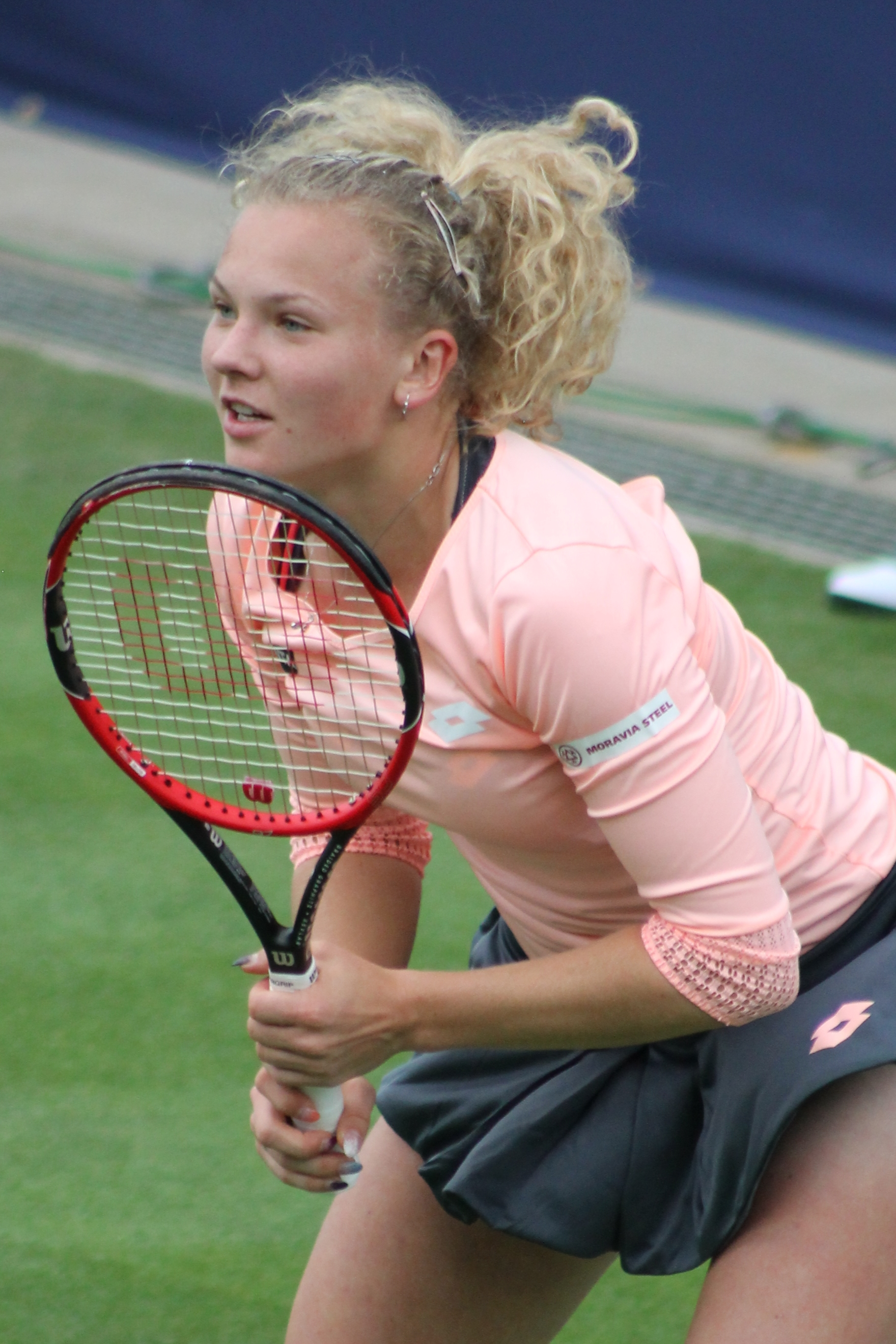
Barbora Krejčíková and Kateřina Siniaková, are the only doubles team to complete the Career Super Slam.

== Champions by year ==
† The French Championships opened itself to international competitors and renamed as Championnats Internationaux de France (de tennis).
†† Australian Open held in December.
††† French Open was held in September 2020 due to the coronavirus pandemic.

Tournament surface
AU	Hard (1988–Present); Grass (1905–1987)
FR	Clay
WB	Grass
US	Hard (1978–Present); Clay (1975–1977); Grass (1881–1974)
Flag Icon Key
List of National Flags

Year	Australian Open (Note: Australian Open: 1977–1986 was held in December.)	French Open (Note: French Championships: 1. Until 1924, were open only to select French club players.; 2. After 1925, the French Championships were open to all nationalities.)	Wimbledon	US Open
1889	started in 1922	started in 1925	started in 1913	(United States) Bertha Townsend (1/1) (United States) Margarette Ballard (1/1)
1890	tournament not created	tournament not created	tournament not created	(United States) Ellen Roosevelt (1/1) (United States) Grace Roosevelt (1/1)
1891	tournament not created	tournament not created	tournament not created	(United Kingdom) Mabel Cahill (1/2) (United States) Emma Leavitt-Morgan (1/1)
1892	tournament not created	tournament not created	tournament not created	(United Kingdom) Mabel Cahill (2/2) (United States) Adeline McKinlay (1/1)
1893	tournament not created	tournament not created	tournament not created	(United States) Aline Terry (1/1) (United States) Hattie Butler (1/1)
1894	tournament not created	tournament not created	tournament not created	(United States) Helen Hellwig (1/2) (United States) Juliette Atkinson (1/7)
1895	tournament not created	tournament not created	tournament not created	(United States) Helen Hellwig (2/2) (United States) Juliette Atkinson (2/7)
1896	tournament not created	tournament not created	tournament not created	(United States) Elisabeth Moore (1/2) (United States) Juliette Atkinson (3/7)
1897	tournament not created	tournament not created	tournament not created	(United States) Juliette Atkinson (4/7) (United States) Kathleen Atkinson (1/2)
1898	tournament not created	tournament not created	tournament not created	(United States) Juliette Atkinson (5/7) (United States) Kathleen Atkinson (2/2)
1899	tournament not created	tournament not created	tournament not created	(United States) Jane Craven (1/1) (United States) Myrtle McAteer (1/2)
1900	tournament not created	tournament not created	tournament not created	(United States) Edith Parker (1/1) (United States) Hallie Champlin (1/1)
1901	tournament not created	tournament not created	tournament not created	(United States) Juliette Atkinson (6/7) (United States) Myrtle McAteer (2/2)
1902	tournament not created	tournament not created	tournament not created	(United States) Juliette Atkinson (7/7) (United States) Marion Jones (1/1)
1903	tournament not created	tournament not created	tournament not created	(United States) Elisabeth Moore (2/2) (United States) Carrie Neely (1/3)
1904	tournament not created	tournament not created	tournament not created	(United States) May Sutton Bundy (1/1) (United States) Miriam Hall (1/1)
1905	tournament not created	tournament not created	tournament not created	(United States) Helen Homans (1/1) (United States) Carrie Neely (2/3)
1906	tournament not created	tournament not created	tournament not created	(United States) Ann Burdette Coe (1/1) (United States) Ethel Bliss Platt (1/1)
1907	tournament not created	tournament not created	tournament not created	(United States) Marie Wimer (1/1) (United States) Carrie Neely (3/3)
1908	tournament not created	tournament not created	tournament not created	(United States) Evelyn Sears (1/1) (United States) Margaret Curtis (1/1)
1909	tournament not created	tournament not created	tournament not created	(United States) Hazel Hotchkiss Wightman (1/7) (United States) Edith Rotch (1/2)
1910	tournament not created	tournament not created	tournament not created	(United States) Hazel Hotchkiss Wightman (2/7) (United States) Edith Rotch (2/2)
1911	tournament not created	tournament not created	tournament not created	(United States) Hazel Hotchkiss Wightman (3/7) (United States) Eleonora R. Sears (1/4)
1912	tournament not created	tournament not created	tournament not created	(United States) Mary Browne (1/6) (United States) Dorothy Green (1/1)
1913	tournament not created	tournament not created	(United Kingdom) Winifred McNair (1/1) (United Kingdom) Dora Boothby (1/1)	(United States) Mary Browne (2/6) (United States) Louise Riddell Williams (1/3)
1914	tournament not created	tournament not created	(United Kingdom) Agnes Morton (1/1) (United States) Elizabeth Ryan (1/17)	(United States) Mary Browne (3/6) (United States) Louise Riddell Williams (2/3)
1915	tournament not created	tournament not created	World War I	(United States) Hazel Hotchkiss Wightman (4/7) (United States) Eleonora R. Sears (2/4)
1916	tournament not created	tournament not created	World War I	(Norway) Molla Bjurstedt (1/2) (United States) Eleonora R. Sears (3/4)
1917	tournament not created	tournament not created	World War I	(Norway) Molla Bjurstedt (2/2) (United States) Eleonora R. Sears (4/4)
1918	tournament not created	tournament not created	World War I	(United States) Marion Zinderstein Jessup (1/4) (United States) Eleanor Goss (1/4)
1919	tournament not created	tournament not created	(France) Suzanne Lenglen (1/8) (United States) Elizabeth Ryan (2/17)	(United States) Marion Zinderstein Jessup (2/4) (United States) Eleanor Goss (2/4)
1920	tournament not created	tournament not created	(France) Suzanne Lenglen (2/8) (United States) Elizabeth Ryan (3/17)	(United States) Marion Zinderstein Jessup (3/4) (United States) Eleanor Goss (3/4)
1921	tournament not created	tournament not created	(France) Suzanne Lenglen (3/8) (United States) Elizabeth Ryan (4/17)	(United States) Mary Browne (4/6) (United States) Louise Riddell Williams (3/3)
1922	(Australia) Esna Boyd Robertson (1/4) (Australia) Marjorie Mountain (1/1)	tournament not created	(France) Suzanne Lenglen (4/8) (United States) Elizabeth Ryan (5/17)	(United States) Marion Zinderstein Jessup (4/4) (United States) Helen Wills Moody (1/9)
1923	(Australia) Esna Boyd Robertson (2/4) (Australia) Sylvia Lance (1/3)	tournament not created	(France) Suzanne Lenglen (5/8) (United States) Elizabeth Ryan (6/17)	(United Kingdom) Kathleen McKane Godfree (1/2) (United Kingdom) Phyllis Covell (1/1)
1924	(Australia) Daphne Akhurst (1/5) (Australia) Sylvia Lance (2/3)	tournament not created	(United States) Hazel Hotchkiss Wightman (5/7) (United States) Helen Wills Moody (2/9)	(United States) Hazel Hotchkiss Wightman (6/7) (United States) Helen Wills Moody (3/9)
1925	(Australia) Sylvia Harper (3/3) (Australia) Daphne Akhurst (2/5)	(France) Suzanne Lenglen (6/8) (France) Julie Vlasto (1/2) ^{†}	(France) Suzanne Lenglen (7/8) (United States) Elizabeth Ryan (7/17)	(United States) Mary Browne (5/6) (United States) Helen Wills Moody (4/9)
1926	(Australia) Meryl O'Hara Wood (1/2) (Australia) Esna Boyd Robertson (3/4)	(France) Suzanne Lenglen (8/8) (France) Julie Vlasto (2/2)	(United States) Mary Browne (6/6) (United States) Elizabeth Ryan (8/17)	(United States) Eleanor Goss (4/4) (United States) Elizabeth Ryan (9/17)
1927	(Australia) Meryl O'Hara Wood (2/2) (Australia) Louie Bickerton (1/3)	(South Africa) Irene Bowder Peacock (1/1) (South Africa) Bobbie Heine (1/1)	(United States) Helen Wills Moody (5/9) (United States) Elizabeth Ryan (10/17)	(United Kingdom) Kathleen McKane Godfree (2/2) (United Kingdom) Ermyntrude Harvey (1/1)
1928	(Australia) Daphne Akhurst (3/5) (Australia) Esna Boyd Robertson (4/4)	(United Kingdom) Phoebe Holcroft Watson (1/4) (United Kingdom) Eileen Bennett Whittingstall (1/3)	(United Kingdom) Peggy Saunders (1/3) (United Kingdom) Phoebe Holcroft Watson (2/4)	(United States) Hazel Hotchkiss Wightman (7/7) (United States) Helen Wills Moody (6/9)
1929	(Australia) Daphne Akhurst (4/5) (Australia) Louie Bickerton (2/3)	(Spain) Lilí Álvarez (1/1) (Netherlands) Kornelia Bouman (1/1)	(United Kingdom) Phoebe Holcroft Watson (3/4) (United Kingdom) Peggy Saunders (2/3)	(United Kingdom) Phoebe Holcroft Watson (4/4) (United Kingdom) Peggy Saunders (3/3)
1930	(Australia) Margaret Molesworth (1/3) (Australia) Emily Hood Westacott (1/3)	(United States) Helen Wills Moody (7/9) (United States) Elizabeth Ryan (11/17)	(United States) Helen Wills Moody (8/9) (United States) Elizabeth Ryan (12/17)	(United Kingdom) Betty Nuthall Shoemaker (1/4) (United States) Sarah Palfrey Cooke (1/11)
1931	(Australia) Daphne Cozens (5/5) (Australia) Louie Bickerton (3/3)	(United Kingdom) Eileen Bennett Whittingstall (2/3) (United Kingdom) Betty Nuthall Shoemaker (2/4)	(United Kingdom) Phyllis Mudford (1/1) (United Kingdom) Dorothy S. Barron (1/1)	(United Kingdom) Eileen Bennett Whittingstall (3/3) (United Kingdom) Betty Nuthall Shoemaker (3/4)
1932	(Australia) Coral Buttsworth (1/1) (Australia) Marjorie Cox Crawford (1/1)	(United States) Helen Wills Moody (9/9) (United States) Elizabeth Ryan (13/17)	(France) Doris Metaxa (1/1) (Belgium) Josane Sigart (1/1)	(United States) Helen Jacobs (1/3) (United States) Sarah Palfrey Cooke (2/11)
1933	(Australia) Margaret Molesworth (2/3) (Australia) Emily Hood Westacott (2/3)	(France) Simonne Mathieu (1/9) (United States) Elizabeth Ryan (14/17)	(France) Simonne Mathieu (2/9) (United States) Elizabeth Ryan (15/17)	(United Kingdom) Betty Nuthall Shoemaker (4/4) (United Kingdom) Freda James (1/3)
1934	(Australia) Margaret Molesworth (3/3) (Australia) Emily Hood Westacott (3/3)	(France) Simonne Mathieu (3/9) (United States) Elizabeth Ryan (16/17)	(France) Simonne Mathieu (4/9) (United States) Elizabeth Ryan (17/17)	(United States) Helen Jacobs (2/3) (United States) Sarah Palfrey Cooke (3/11)
1935	(United Kingdom) Evelyn Dearman (1/1) (United Kingdom) Nancy Lyle (1/1)	(United Kingdom) Margaret Scriven Vivian (1/1) (United Kingdom) Kay Stammers Bullitt (1/3)	(United Kingdom) Freda James (2/3) (United Kingdom) Kay Stammers Bullitt (2/3)	(United States) Helen Jacobs (3/3) (United States) Sarah Palfrey Cooke (4/11)
1936	(Australia) Thelma Coyne Long (1/12) (Australia) Nancye Wynne Bolton (1/10)	(France) Simonne Mathieu (5/9) (United Kingdom) Billie Yorke (1/4)	(United Kingdom) Freda James (3/3) (United Kingdom) Kay Stammers Bullitt (3/3)	(United States) Marjorie Gladman Van Ryn (1/1) (United States) Carolin Babcock (1/1)
1937	(Australia) Thelma Coyne Long (2/12) (Australia) Nancye Wynne Bolton (2/10)	(France) Simonne Mathieu (6/9) (United Kingdom) Billie Yorke (2/4)	(France) Simonne Mathieu (7/9) (United Kingdom) Billie Yorke (3/4)	(United States) Sarah Palfrey Cooke (5/11) (United States) Alice Marble (1/6)
1938	(Australia) Thelma Coyne Long (3/12) (Australia) Nancye Wynne Bolton (3/10)	(France) Simonne Mathieu (8/9) (United Kingdom) Billie Yorke (4/4)	(United States) Sarah Palfrey Cooke (6/11) (United States) Alice Marble (2/6)	(United States) Sarah Palfrey Cooke (7/11) (United States) Alice Marble (3/6)
1939	(Australia) Thelma Coyne Long (4/12) (Australia) Nancye Wynne Bolton (4/10)	(France) Simonne Mathieu (9/9) (Poland) Jadwiga Jędrzejowska (1/1)	(United States) Sarah Palfrey Cooke (8/11) (United States) Alice Marble (4/6)	(United States) Sarah Palfrey Cooke (9/11) (United States) Alice Marble (5/6)
1940	(Australia) Thelma Coyne Long (5/12) (Australia) Nancye Wynne Bolton (5/10)	tournament cancelled	World War II	(United States) Sarah Palfrey Cooke (10/11) (United States) Alice Marble (6/6)
1941	World War II	France held under German occupation	World War II	(United States) Sarah Palfrey Cooke (11/11) (United States) Margaret Osborne duPont (1/21)
1942	World War II	France held under German occupation	World War II	(United States) Louise Brough Clapp (1/21) (United States) Margaret Osborne duPont (2/21)
1943	World War II	France held under German occupation	World War II	(United States) Louise Brough Clapp (2/21) (United States) Margaret Osborne duPont (3/21)
1944	World War II	France held under German occupation	World War II	(United States) Louise Brough Clapp (3/21) (United States) Margaret Osborne duPont (4/21)
1945	World War II	France held under German occupation	World War II	(United States) Louise Brough Clapp (4/21) (United States) Margaret Osborne duPont (5/21)
1946	(Australia) Joyce Fitch (1/1) (Australia) Mary Bevis Hawton (1/5)	(United States) Louise Brough Clapp (5/21) (United States) Margaret Osborne duPont (6/21)	(United States) Louise Brough Clapp (6/21) (United States) Margaret Osborne duPont (7/21)	(United States) Louise Brough Clapp (7/21) (United States) Margaret Osborne duPont (8/21)
1947	(Australia) Thelma Coyne Long (6/12) (Australia) Nancye Wynne Bolton (6/10)	(United States) Louise Brough Clapp (8/21) (United States) Margaret Osborne duPont (9/21)	(United States) Patricia Canning Todd (1/2) (United States) Doris Hart (1/14)	(United States) Louise Brough Clapp (9/21) (United States) Margaret Osborne duPont (10/21)
1948	(Australia) Thelma Coyne Long (7/12) (Australia) Nancye Wynne Bolton (7/10)	(United States) Doris Hart (2/14) (United States) Patricia Canning Todd (2/2)	(United States) Louise Brough Clapp (10/21) (United States) Margaret Osborne duPont (11/21)	(United States) Louise Brough Clapp (11/21) (United States) Margaret Osborne duPont (12/21)
1949	(Australia) Thelma Coyne Long (8/12) (Australia) Nancye Wynne Bolton (8/10)	(United States) Louise Brough Clapp (12/21) (United States) Margaret Osborne duPont (13/21)	(United States) Louise Brough Clapp (13/21) (United States) Margaret Osborne duPont (14/21)	(United States) Louise Brough Clapp (14/21) (United States) Margaret Osborne duPont (15/21)
1950	(United States) Louise Brough Clapp (15/21) (United States) Doris Hart (3/14)	(United States) Shirley Fry Irvin (1/12) (United States) Doris Hart (4/14)	(United States) Louise Brough Clapp (16/21) (United States) Margaret Osborne duPont (16/21)	(United States) Louise Brough Clapp (17/21) (United States) Margaret Osborne duPont (17/21)
1951	(Australia) Thelma Coyne Long (9/12) (Australia) Nancye Wynne Bolton (9/10)	(United States) Shirley Fry Irvin (2/12) (United States) Doris Hart (5/14)	(United States) Shirley Fry Irvin (3/12) (United States) Doris Hart (6/14)	(United States) Shirley Fry Irvin (4/12) (United States) Doris Hart (7/14)
1952	(Australia) Thelma Coyne Long (10/12) (Australia) Nancye Wynne Bolton (10/10)	(United States) Shirley Fry Irvin (5/12) (United States) Doris Hart (8/14)	(United States) Shirley Fry Irvin (6/12) (United States) Doris Hart (9/14)	(United States) Shirley Fry Irvin (7/12) (United States) Doris Hart (10/14)
1953	(United States) Maureen Connolly Brinker (1/2) (United States) Julia Sampson Hayward (1/1)	(United States) Shirley Fry Irvin (8/12) (United States) Doris Hart (11/14)	(United States) Shirley Fry Irvin (9/12) (United States) Doris Hart (12/14)	(United States) Shirley Fry Irvin (10/12) (United States) Doris Hart (13/14)
1954	(Australia) Mary Bevis Hawton (2/5) (Australia) Beryl Penrose (1/2)	(United States) Maureen Connolly Brinker (2/2) (Australia) Nell Hall Hopman (1/1)	(United States) Louise Brough Clapp (18/21) (United States) Margaret Osborne duPont (18/21)	(United States) Shirley Fry Irvin (11/12) (United States) Doris Hart (14/14)
1955	(Australia) Mary Bevis Hawton (3/5) (Australia) Beryl Penrose (2/2)	(United States) Beverly Baker Fleitz (1/1) (United States) Darlene Hard (1/13)	(United Kingdom) Angela Mortimer Barrett (1/1) (United Kingdom) Anne Shilcock (1/1)	(United States) Louise Brough Clapp (19/21) (United States) Margaret Osborne duPont (19/21)
1956	(Australia) Mary Bevis Hawton (4/5) (Australia) Thelma Coyne Long (11/12)	(United Kingdom) Angela Buxton (1/2) (United States) Althea Gibson (1/5)	(United Kingdom) Angela Buxton (2/2) (United States) Althea Gibson (2/5)	(United States) Louise Brough Clapp (20/21) (United States) Margaret Osborne duPont (20/21)
1957	(United States) Althea Gibson (3/5) (United States) Shirley Fry Irvin (12/12)	(United Kingdom) Shirley Bloomer Brasher (1/1) (United States) Darlene Hard (2/13)	(United States) Althea Gibson (4/5) (United States) Darlene Hard (3/13)	(United States) Louise Brough Clapp (21/21) (United States) Margaret Osborne duPont (21/21)
1958	(Australia) Mary Bevis Hawton (5/5) (Australia) Thelma Coyne Long (12/12)	(Mexico) Rosie Reyes Darmon (1/1) (Mexico) Yola Ramírez Ochoa (1/1)	(Brazil) Maria Bueno (1/11) (United States) Althea Gibson (5/5)	(United States) Jeanne Arth (1/3) (United States) Darlene Hard (4/13)
1959	(South Africa) Renee Schuurman Haygarth (1/5) (South Africa) Sandra Reynolds Price (1/4)	(South Africa) Renee Schuurman Haygarth (2/5) (South Africa) Sandra Reynolds Price (2/4)	(United States) Jeanne Arth (2/3) (United States) Darlene Hard (5/13)	(United States) Jeanne Arth (3/3) (United States) Darlene Hard (6/13)
1960	(Brazil) Maria Bueno (2/11) (United Kingdom) Christine Truman Janes (1/1)	(Brazil) Maria Bueno (3/11) (United States) Darlene Hard (7/13)	(Brazil) Maria Bueno (4/11) (United States) Darlene Hard (8/13)	(Brazil) Maria Bueno (5/11) (United States) Darlene Hard (9/13)
1961	(Australia) Mary Carter Reitano (1/1) (Australia) Margaret Court (1/19)	(South Africa) Sandra Reynolds Price (3/4) (South Africa) Renee Schuurman Haygarth (3/5)	(United States) Karen Hantze Susman (1/3) (United States) Billie Jean King (1/16)	(United States) Darlene Hard (10/13) (Australia) Lesley Turner Bowrey (1/7)
1962	(Australia) Margaret Court (2/19) (Australia) Robyn Ebbern (1/3)	(South Africa) Sandra Reynolds Price (4/4) (South Africa) Renee Schuurman Haygarth (4/5)	(United States) Karen Hantze Susman (2/3) (United States) Billie Jean King (2/16)	(United States) Darlene Hard (11/13) (Brazil) Maria Bueno (6/11)
1963	(Australia) Margaret Court (3/19) (Australia) Robyn Ebbern (2/3)	(United Kingdom) Ann Haydon-Jones (1/3) (South Africa) Renee Schuurman Haygarth (5/5)	(Brazil) Maria Bueno (7/11) (United States) Darlene Hard (12/13)	(Australia) Margaret Court (4/19) (Australia) Robyn Ebbern (3/3)
1964	(Australia) Judy Tegart-Dalton (1/8) (Australia) Lesley Turner Bowrey (2/7)	(Australia) Margaret Court (5/19) (Australia) Lesley Turner Bowrey (3/7)	(Australia) Margaret Court (6/19) (Australia) Lesley Turner Bowrey (4/7)	(United States) Billie Jean King (3/16) (United States) Karen Hantze Susman (3/3)
1965	(Australia) Margaret Court (7/19) (Australia) Lesley Turner Bowrey (5/7)	(Australia) Margaret Court (8/19) (Australia) Lesley Turner Bowrey (6/7)	(Brazil) Maria Bueno (8/11) (United States) Nancy Richey Gunter (1/4)	(United States) Carole Caldwell Graebner (1/2) (United States) Nancy Richey Gunter (2/4)
1966	(United States) Carole Caldwell Graebner (2/2) (United States) Nancy Richey Gunter (3/4)	(Australia) Margaret Court (9/19) (Australia) Judy Tegart-Dalton (2/8)	(Brazil) Maria Bueno (9/11) (United States) Billie Jean King (4/16)	(Brazil) Maria Bueno (10/11) (United States) Nancy Richey Gunter (4/4)
1967	(Australia) Lesley Turner Bowrey (7/7) (Australia) Judy Tegart-Dalton (3/8)	(France) Françoise Dürr (1/7) (Australia) Gail Sheriff (1/4)	(United States) Rosemary Casals (1/9) (United States) Billie Jean King (5/16)	(United States) Rosemary Casals (2/9) (United States) Billie Jean King (6/16)
1968	(Australia) Karen Krantzcke (1/1) (Australia) Kerry Melville Reid (1/3)	↓ Open Era ↓		
1968	↓ Open Era ↓	(France) Françoise Dürr (2/7) (United Kingdom) Ann Haydon-Jones (2/3)	(United States) Rosemary Casals (3/9) (United States) Billie Jean King (7/16)	(Brazil) Maria Bueno (11/11) (Australia) Margaret Court (10/19)
1969	(Australia) Margaret Court (11/19) (Australia) Judy Tegart-Dalton (4/8)	(France) Françoise Dürr (3/7) (United Kingdom) Ann Haydon-Jones (3/3)	(Australia) Margaret Court (12/19) (Australia) Judy Tegart-Dalton (5/8)	(France) Françoise Dürr (4/7) (United States) Darlene Hard (13/13)
1970	(Australia) Margaret Court (13/19) (Australia) Judy Tegart-Dalton (6/8)	(France) Gail Chanfreau (2/4) (France) Françoise Dürr (5/7)	(United States) Rosemary Casals (4/9) (United States) Billie Jean King (8/16)	(Australia) Margaret Court (14/19) (Australia) Judy Tegart-Dalton (7/8)
1971	(Australia) Margaret Court (15/19) (Australia) Evonne Goolagong (1/6)	(France) Gail Chanfreau (3/4) (France) Françoise Dürr (6/7)	(United States) Rosemary Casals (5/9) (United States) Billie Jean King (9/16)	(United States) Rosemary Casals (6/9) (Australia) Judy Tegart-Dalton (8/8)
1972	(Australia) Kerry Harris (1/1) (Australia) Helen Gourlay (1/5)	(United States) Billie Jean King (10/16) (Netherlands) Betty Stöve (1/6)	(United States) Billie Jean King (11/16) (Netherlands) Betty Stöve (2/6)	(France) Françoise Dürr (7/7) (Netherlands) Betty Stöve (3/6)
1973	(Australia) Margaret Court (16/19) (United Kingdom) Virginia Wade (1/4)	(Australia) Margaret Court (17/19) (United Kingdom) Virginia Wade (2/4)	(United States) Rosemary Casals (7/9) (United States) Billie Jean King (12/16)	(Australia) Margaret Court (18/19) (United Kingdom) Virginia Wade (3/4)
1974	(Australia) Evonne Goolagong (2/6) (United States) Peggy Michel (1/3)	(United States) Chris Evert (1/3) (Soviet Union) Olga Morozova (1/1)	(Australia) Evonne Goolagong (3/6) (United States) Peggy Michel (2/3)	(United States) Rosemary Casals (8/9) (United States) Billie Jean King (13/16)
1975	(Australia) Evonne Goolagong (4/6) (United States) Peggy Michel (3/3)	(United States) Chris Evert (2/3) (Czechoslovakia) Martina Navrátilová (1/31)	(United States) Ann Kiyomura (1/1) (Japan) Kazuko Sawamatsu (1/1)	(Australia) Margaret Court (19/19) (United Kingdom) Virginia Wade (4/4)
1976	(Australia) Evonne Cawley (5/6) (Australia) Helen Gourlay (2/5)	(Uruguay) Fiorella Bonicelli (1/1) (France) Gail Lovera (4/4)	(United States) Chris Evert (3/3) (United States) Martina Navrátilová (2/31)	(South Africa) Delina Boshoff (1/1) (South Africa) Ilana Kloss (1/1)
1977	(Australia) Dianne Fromholtz Balestrat (1/1) (Australia) Helen Cawley (3/5) ^{(Jan)}	(Czechoslovakia) Regina Maršíková (1/1) (United States) Pam Teeguarden (1/1)	(Australia) Helen Cawley (4/5) (United States) JoAnne Russell (1/1)	(United States) Martina Navratilova (3/31) (Netherlands) Betty Stöve (4/6)
1977	(Australia) Evonne Cawley (6/6) (Australia) Helen Cawley (5/5) ^{(Dec)}	(Czechoslovakia) Regina Maršíková (1/1) (United States) Pam Teeguarden (1/1)	(Australia) Helen Cawley (4/5) (United States) JoAnne Russell (1/1)	(United States) Martina Navratilova (3/31) (Netherlands) Betty Stöve (4/6)
1977	shared with	(Czechoslovakia) Regina Maršíková (1/1) (United States) Pam Teeguarden (1/1)	(Australia) Helen Cawley (4/5) (United States) JoAnne Russell (1/1)	(United States) Martina Navratilova (3/31) (Netherlands) Betty Stöve (4/6)
1977	(United States) Mona Guerrant (1/1) (Australia) Kerry Melville Reid (2/3) ^{(Dec)}	(Czechoslovakia) Regina Maršíková (1/1) (United States) Pam Teeguarden (1/1)	(Australia) Helen Cawley (4/5) (United States) JoAnne Russell (1/1)	(United States) Martina Navratilova (3/31) (Netherlands) Betty Stöve (4/6)
1978	(United States) Betsy Nagelsen (1/2) (Czechoslovakia) Renáta Tomanová (1/1) ^{††}	(Socialist Federal Republic of Yugoslavia) Mima Jaušovec (1/1) (Romania) Virginia Ruzici (1/1)	(Australia) Kerry Melville Reid (3/3) (Australia) Wendy Turnbull (1/4)	(United States) Billie Jean King (14/16) (United States) Martina Navratilova (4/31)
1979	(New Zealand) Judy Connor (1/1) (Australia) Diane Evers (1/1) ^{††}	(Netherlands) Betty Stöve (5/6) (Australia) Wendy Turnbull (2/4)	(United States) Billie Jean King (15/16) (United States) Martina Navratilova (5/31)	(Netherlands) Betty Stöve (6/6) (Australia) Wendy Turnbull (3/4)
1980	(United States) Martina Navratilova (7/31) (United States) Betsy Nagelsen (2/2) ^{††}	(United States) Kathy Jordan (1/5) (United States) Anne Smith (1/5)	(United States) Kathy Jordan (2/5) (United States) Anne Smith (2/5)	(United States) Billie Jean King (16/16) (United States) Martina Navratilova (6/31)
1981	(United States) Kathy Jordan (4/5) (United States) Anne Smith (4/5) ^{††}	(South Africa) Rosalyn Fairbank Nideffer (1/2) (South Africa) Tanya Harford (1/1)	(United States) Martina Navratilova (8/31) (United States) Pam Shriver (1/21)	(United States) Kathy Jordan (3/5) (United States) Anne Smith (3/5)
1982	(United States) Martina Navratilova (11/31) (United States) Pam Shriver (3/21) ^{††}	(United States) Martina Navratilova (9/31) (United States) Anne Smith (5/5)	(United States) Martina Navratilova (10/31) (United States) Pam Shriver (2/21)	(United States) Rosemary Casals (9/9) (Australia) Wendy Turnbull (4/4)
1983	(United States) Martina Navratilova (14/31) (United States) Pam Shriver (6/21) ^{††}	(South Africa) Rosalyn Fairbank Nideffer (2/2) (United States) Candy Reynolds (1/1)	(United States) Martina Navratilova (12/31) (United States) Pam Shriver (4/21)	(United States) Martina Navratilova (13/31) (United States) Pam Shriver (5/21)
1984	(United States) Martina Navratilova (18/31) (United States) Pam Shriver (10/21) ^{††}	(United States) Martina Navratilova (15/31) (United States) Pam Shriver (7/21)	(United States) Martina Navratilova (16/31) (United States) Pam Shriver (8/21)	(United States) Martina Navratilova (17/31) (United States) Pam Shriver (9/21)
1985	(United States) Martina Navratilova (20/31) (United States) Pam Shriver (12/21) ^{††}	(United States) Martina Navratilova (19/31) (United States) Pam Shriver (11/21)	(United States) Kathy Jordan (5/5) (Australia) Elizabeth Sayers Smylie (1/1)	(Germany) Claudia Kohde-Kilsch (1/2) (Czechoslovakia) Helena Suková (1/9)
1986	no competition	(United States) Martina Navratilova (21/31) (Hungary) Andrea Temesvári (1/1)	(United States) Martina Navratilova (22/31) (United States) Pam Shriver (13/21)	(United States) Martina Navratilova (23/31) (United States) Pam Shriver (14/21)
1987	(United States) Martina Navratilova (24/31) (United States) Pam Shriver (15/21)	(United States) Martina Navratilova (25/31) (United States) Pam Shriver (16/21)	(Germany) Claudia Kohde-Kilsch (2/2) (Czechoslovakia) Helena Suková (2/9)	(United States) Martina Navratilova (26/31) (United States) Pam Shriver (17/21)
1988	(United States) Martina Navratilova (27/31) (United States) Pam Shriver (18/21)	(United States) Martina Navratilova (28/31) (United States) Pam Shriver (19/21)	(Germany) Steffi Graf (1/1) (Argentina) Gabriela Sabatini (1/1)	(United States) Gigi Fernández (1/17) (United States) Robin White (1/1)
1989	(United States) Martina Navratilova (29/31) (United States) Pam Shriver (20/21)	(Soviet Union) Larisa Savchenko Neiland (1/2) (Soviet Union) Natasha Zvereva (1/18)	(Czechoslovakia) Jana Novotná (1/12) (Czechoslovakia) Helena Suková (3/9)	(Australia) Hana Mandlíková (1/1) (United States) Martina Navratilova (30/31)
1990	(Czechoslovakia) Jana Novotná (2/12) (Czechoslovakia) Helena Suková (4/9)	(Czechoslovakia) Jana Novotná (3/12) (Czechoslovakia) Helena Suková (5/9)	(Czechoslovakia) Jana Novotná (4/12) (Czechoslovakia) Helena Suková (6/9)	(United States) Gigi Fernández (2/17) (United States) Martina Navratilova (31/31)
1991	(United States) Patty Fendick (1/1) (United States) Mary Joe Fernández (1/2)	(United States) Gigi Fernández (3/17) (Czechoslovakia) Jana Novotná (5/12)	(Soviet Union) Larisa Savchenko Neiland (2/2) (Soviet Union) Natasha Zvereva (2/18)	(United States) Pam Shriver (21/21) (Soviet Union) Natasha Zvereva (3/18)
1992	(Spain) Arantxa Sánchez Vicario (1/6) (Czechoslovakia) Helena Suková (7/9)	(United States) Gigi Fernández (4/17) (Commonwealth of Independent States) Natasha Zvereva (4/18)	(United States) Gigi Fernández (5/17) (Commonwealth of Independent States) Natasha Zvereva (5/18)	(United States) Gigi Fernández (6/17) (Commonwealth of Independent States) Natasha Zvereva (6/18)
1993	(United States) Gigi Fernández (7/17) (Belarus) Natasha Zvereva (7/18)	(United States) Gigi Fernández (8/17) (Belarus) Natasha Zvereva (8/18)	(United States) Gigi Fernández (9/17) (Belarus) Natasha Zvereva (9/18)	(Spain) Arantxa Sánchez Vicario (2/6) (Czech Republic) Helena Suková (8/9)
1994	(United States) Gigi Fernández (10/17) (Belarus) Natasha Zvereva (10/18)	(United States) Gigi Fernández (11/17) (Belarus) Natasha Zvereva (11/18)	(United States) Gigi Fernández (12/17) (Belarus) Natasha Zvereva (12/18)	(Czech Republic) Jana Novotná (6/12) (Spain) Arantxa Sánchez Vicario (3/6)
1995	(Czech Republic) Jana Novotná (7/12) (Spain) Arantxa Sánchez Vicario (4/6)	(United States) Gigi Fernández (13/17) (Belarus) Natasha Zvereva (13/18)	(Czech Republic) Jana Novotná (8/12) (Spain) Arantxa Sánchez Vicario (5/6)	(United States) Gigi Fernández (14/17) (Belarus) Natasha Zvereva (14/18)
1996	(United States) Chanda Rubin (1/1) (Spain) Arantxa Sánchez Vicario (6/6)	(United States) Lindsay Davenport (1/3) (United States) Mary Joe Fernández (2/2)	(Switzerland) Martina Hingis (1/13) (Czech Republic) Helena Suková (9/9)	(United States) Gigi Fernández (15/17) (Belarus) Natasha Zvereva (15/18)
1997	(Switzerland) Martina Hingis (2/13) (Belarus) Natasha Zvereva (16/18)	(United States) Gigi Fernández (16/17) (Belarus) Natasha Zvereva (17/18)	(United States) Gigi Fernández (17/17) (Belarus) Natasha Zvereva (18/18)	(United States) Lindsay Davenport (2/3) (Czech Republic) Jana Novotná (9/12)
1998	(Switzerland) Martina Hingis (3/13) (Croatia) Mirjana Lučić (1/1)	(Switzerland) Martina Hingis (4/13) (Czech Republic) Jana Novotná (10/12)	(Switzerland) Martina Hingis (5/13) (Czech Republic) Jana Novotná (11/12)	(Switzerland) Martina Hingis (6/13) (Czech Republic) Jana Novotná (12/12)
1999	(Switzerland) Martina Hingis (7/13) (Russia) Anna Kournikova (1/2)	(United States) Serena Williams (1/14) (United States) Venus Williams (1/14)	(United States) Lindsay Davenport (3/3) (United States) Corina Morariu (1/1)	(United States) Serena Williams (2/14) (United States) Venus Williams (2/14)
2000	(United States) Lisa Raymond (1/6) (Australia) Rennae Stubbs (1/4)	(Switzerland) Martina Hingis (8/13) (France) Mary Pierce (1/1)	(United States) Serena Williams (3/14) (United States) Venus Williams (3/14)	(France) Julie Halard-Decugis (1/1) (Japan) Ai Sugiyama (1/3)
2001	(United States) Serena Williams (4/14) (United States) Venus Williams (4/14)	(Spain) Virginia Ruano Pascual (1/10) (Argentina) Paola Suárez (1/8)	(United States) Lisa Raymond (2/6) (Australia) Rennae Stubbs (2/4)	(United States) Lisa Raymond (3/6) (Australia) Rennae Stubbs (3/4)
2002	(Switzerland) Martina Hingis (9/13) (Russia) Anna Kournikova (2/2)	(Spain) Virginia Ruano Pascual (2/10) (Argentina) Paola Suárez (2/8)	(United States) Serena Williams (5/14) (United States) Venus Williams (5/14)	(Spain) Virginia Ruano Pascual (3/10) (Argentina) Paola Suárez (3/8)
2003	(United States) Serena Williams (6/14) (United States) Venus Williams (6/14)	(Belgium) Kim Clijsters (1/2) (Japan) Ai Sugiyama (2/3)	(Belgium) Kim Clijsters (2/2) (Japan) Ai Sugiyama (3/3)	(Spain) Virginia Ruano Pascual (4/10) (Argentina) Paola Suárez (4/8)
2004	(Spain) Virginia Ruano Pascual (5/10) (Argentina) Paola Suárez (5/8)	(Spain) Virginia Ruano Pascual (6/10) (Argentina) Paola Suárez (6/8)	(Zimbabwe) Cara Black (1/5) (Australia) Rennae Stubbs (4/4)	(Spain) Virginia Ruano Pascual (7/10) (Argentina) Paola Suárez (7/8)
2005	(Russia) Svetlana Kuznetsova (1/2) (Australia) Alicia Molik (1/2)	(Spain) Virginia Ruano Pascual (8/10) (Argentina) Paola Suárez (8/8)	(Zimbabwe) Cara Black (2/5) (South Africa) Liezel Huber (1/5)	(United States) Lisa Raymond (4/6) (Australia) Samantha Stosur (1/4)
2006	(China) Yan Zi (1/2) (China) Zheng Jie (1/2)	(United States) Lisa Raymond (5/6) (Australia) Samantha Stosur (2/4)	(China) Yan Zi (2/2) (China) Zheng Jie (2/2)	(France) Nathalie Dechy (1/2) (Russia) Vera Zvonareva (1/3)
2007	(Zimbabwe) Cara Black (3/5) (South Africa) Liezel Huber (2/5)	(Australia) Alicia Molik (2/2) (Italy) Mara Santangelo (1/1)	(Zimbabwe) Cara Black (4/5) (South Africa) Liezel Huber (3/5)	(France) Nathalie Dechy (2/2) (Russia) Dinara Safina (1/1)
2008	(Ukraine) Alona Bondarenko (1/1) (Ukraine) Kateryna Bondarenko (1/1)	(Spain) Anabel Medina Garrigues (1/2) (Spain) Virginia Ruano Pascual (9/10)	(United States) Serena Williams (7/14) (United States) Venus Williams (7/14)	(Zimbabwe) Cara Black (5/5) (United States) Liezel Huber (4/5)
2009	(United States) Serena Williams (8/14) (United States) Venus Williams (8/14)	(Spain) Anabel Medina Garrigues (2/2) (Spain) Virginia Ruano Pascual (10/10)	(United States) Serena Williams (9/14) (United States) Venus Williams (9/14)	(United States) Serena Williams (10/14) (United States) Venus Williams (10/14)
2010	(United States) Serena Williams (11/14) (United States) Venus Williams (11/14)	(United States) Serena Williams (12/14) (United States) Venus Williams (12/14)	(United States) Vania King (1/2) (Kazakhstan) Yaroslava Shvedova (1/2)	(United States) Vania King (2/2) (Kazakhstan) Yaroslava Shvedova (2/2)
2011	(Argentina) Gisela Dulko (1/1) (Italy) Flavia Pennetta (1/1)	(Czech Republic) Andrea Hlaváčková (1/2) (Czech Republic) Lucie Hradecká (1/2)	(Czech Republic) Květa Peschke (1/1) (Slovenia) Katarina Srebotnik (1/1)	(United States) Liezel Huber (5/5) (United States) Lisa Raymond (6/6)
2012	(Russia) Svetlana Kuznetsova (2/2) (Russia) Vera Zvonareva (2/3)	(Italy) Sara Errani (1/6) (Italy) Roberta Vinci (1/5)	(United States) Serena Williams (13/14) (United States) Venus Williams (13/14)	(Italy) Sara Errani (2/6) (Italy) Roberta Vinci (2/5)
2013	(Italy) Sara Errani (3/6) (Italy) Roberta Vinci (3/5)	(Russia) Ekaterina Makarova (1/3) (Russia) Elena Vesnina (1/3)	(Chinese Taipei) Hsieh Su-wei (1/7) (China) Peng Shuai (1/2)	(Czech Republic) Andrea Hlaváčková (2/2) (Czech Republic) Lucie Hradecká (2/2)
2014	(Italy) Sara Errani (4/6) (Italy) Roberta Vinci (4/5)	(Chinese Taipei) Hsieh Su-wei (2/7) (China) Peng Shuai (2/2)	(Italy) Sara Errani (5/6) (Italy) Roberta Vinci (5/5)	(Russia) Ekaterina Makarova (2/3) (Russia) Elena Vesnina (2/3)
2015	(United States) Bethanie Mattek-Sands (1/5) (Czech Republic) Lucie Šafářová (1/5)	(United States) Bethanie Mattek-Sands (2/5) (Czech Republic) Lucie Šafářová (2/5)	(Switzerland) Martina Hingis (10/13) (India) Sania Mirza (1/3)	(Switzerland) Martina Hingis (11/13) (India) Sania Mirza (2/3)
2016	(Switzerland) Martina Hingis (12/13) (India) Sania Mirza (3/3)	(France) Caroline Garcia (1/2) (France) Kristina Mladenovic (1/7)	(United States) Serena Williams (14/14) (United States) Venus Williams (14/14)	(United States) Bethanie Mattek-Sands (3/5) (Czech Republic) Lucie Šafářová (3/5)
2017	(United States) Bethanie Mattek-Sands (4/5) (Czech Republic) Lucie Šafářová (4/5)	(United States) Bethanie Mattek-Sands (5/5) (Czech Republic) Lucie Šafářová (5/5)	(Russia) Ekaterina Makarova (3/3) (Russia) Elena Vesnina (3/3)	(Chinese Taipei) Chan Yung-jan (1/1) (Switzerland) Martina Hingis (13/13)
2018	(Hungary) Tímea Babos (1/4) (France) Kristina Mladenovic (2/7)	(Czech Republic) Barbora Krejčíková (1/7) (Czech Republic) Kateřina Siniaková (1/12)	(Czech Republic) Barbora Krejčíková (2/7) (Czech Republic) Kateřina Siniaková (2/12)	(Australia) Ashleigh Barty (1/1) (United States) CoCo Vandeweghe (1/1)
2019	(Australia) Samantha Stosur (3/4) (China) Zhang Shuai (1/3)	(Hungary) Tímea Babos (2/4) (France) Kristina Mladenovic (3/7)	(Chinese Taipei) Hsieh Su-wei (3/7) (Czech Republic) Barbora Strýcová (1/2)	(Belgium) Elise Mertens (1/6) (Belarus) Aryna Sabalenka (1/2)
2020	(Hungary) Tímea Babos (3/4) (France) Kristina Mladenovic (4/7)	(Hungary) Tímea Babos (4/4) (France) Kristina Mladenovic (5/7) ^{†††}	cancelled due to COVID-19 pandemic	(Germany) Laura Siegemund (1/1) (Russia) Vera Zvonareva (3/3)
2021	(Belgium) Elise Mertens (2/6) (Belarus) Aryna Sabalenka (2/2)	(Czech Republic) Barbora Krejčíková (3/7) (Czech Republic) Kateřina Siniaková (3/12)	(Chinese Taipei) Hsieh Su-wei (4/7) (Belgium) Elise Mertens (3/6)	(Australia) Samantha Stosur (4/4) (China) Zhang Shuai (2/3)
2022	(Czech Republic) Barbora Krejčíková (4/7) (Czech Republic) Kateřina Siniaková (4/12)	(France) Caroline Garcia (2/2) (France) Kristina Mladenovic (6/7)	(Czech Republic) Barbora Krejčíková (5/7) (Czech Republic) Kateřina Siniaková (5/12)	(Czech Republic) Barbora Krejčíková (6/7) (Czech Republic) Kateřina Siniaková (6/12)
2023	(Czech Republic) Barbora Krejčíková (7/7) (Czech Republic) Kateřina Siniaková (7/12)	(Chinese Taipei) Hsieh Su-wei (5/7) (China) Wang Xinyu (1/1)	(Chinese Taipei) Hsieh Su-wei (6/7) (Czech Republic) Barbora Strýcová (2/2)	(Canada) Gabriela Dabrowski (1/2) (New Zealand) Erin Routliffe (1/2)
2024	(Chinese Taipei) Hsieh Su-wei (7/7) (Belgium) Elise Mertens (4/6)	(United States) Coco Gauff (1/1) (Czech Republic) Kateřina Siniaková (8/12)	(Czech Republic) Kateřina Siniaková (9/12) (United States) Taylor Townsend (1/4)	(Ukraine) Lyudmyla Kichenok (1/1) (Latvia) Jeļena Ostapenko (1/1)
2025	(Czech Republic) Kateřina Siniaková (10/12) (United States) Taylor Townsend (2/4)	(Italy) Sara Errani (6/6) (Italy) Jasmine Paolini (1/1)	Veronika Kudermetova (Note: On 1 March 2022, the WTA announced that players from Russia will not be allowed to compete under the name or flag of Russia following the 2022 Russian invasion of Ukraine. Veronika Kudermetova thus competed as neutral player since then and her first and only title is not attributed to Russia in the "Grand Slam titles by country" list.) (1/1) (Belgium) Elise Mertens (5/6)	(Canada) Gabriela Dabrowski (2/2) (New Zealand) Erin Routliffe (2/2)
2026	(Belgium) Elise Mertens (6/6) (China) Zhang Shuai (3/3)	(Czech Republic) Kateřina Siniaková (11/12) (United States) Taylor Townsend (3/4)	(China) Guo Hanyu (1/1) (France) Kristina Mladenovic (7/7)	(Czech Republic) Kateřina Siniaková (12/12) (United States) Taylor Townsend (4/4)
Year	Australian Open	French Open	Wimbledon	US Open

== Champions list ==
=== Most Grand Slam doubles titles ===
AO Australian Open	WIM Wimbledon
FO French Open	USO US Open

==== Individual ====
Active players and tournament records indicated in bold.

Titles	Player	AO	FO	WIM	USO	Years
31	(Czechoslovakia) / (United States) Martina Navratilova	8	**7**	7	9	1975–1990
21	(United States) Margaret Osborne duPont	0	3	5	**13**	1941–1957
21	(United States) Louise Brough Clapp	1	3	5	12	1942–1957
21	(United States) Pam Shriver	7	4	5	5	1981–1991
19	(Australia) Margaret Court	8	4	2	5	1961–1975
18	(Soviet Union) / (Commonwealth of Independent States) / (Belarus) Natasha Zvereva	3	6	5	4	1989–1997
17	(United States) Elizabeth Ryan	0	4	**12**	1	1914–1934
17	(United States) Gigi Fernández	2	6	4	5	1988–1997
16	(United States) Billie Jean King	0	1	10	5	1961–1980
14	(United States) Doris Hart	1	5	4	4	1947–1954
14	(United States) **Serena Williams**	4	2	6	2	1999–2016
14	(United States) **Venus Williams**	4	2	6	2	1999–2016
Top 10

==== Team ====
Active teams and tournament records indicated in bold.

Titles	Player	AO	FO	WIM	USO	Years
20	(United States) Margaret Osborne duPont (United States) Louise Brough	0	3	5	**12**	1942–1957
20	(United States) Martina Navratilova (United States) Pam Shriver	7	4	5	4	1981–1989
14	(Commonwealth of Independent States) / (Belarus) Natasha Zvereva (United States) Gigi Fernández	2	**5**	4	3	1992–1997
14	(United States) **Serena Williams** (United States) **Venus Williams**	4	2	**6**	2	1999–2016
11	(United States) Doris Hart (United States) Shirley Fry Irvin	0	4	3	4	1950–1954
10	(Australia) Thelma Coyne Long (Australia) Nancye Wynne Bolton	**10**	0	0	0	1936–1952
8	(Spain) Virginia Ruano Pascual (Argentina) Paola Suárez	1	4	0	3	2001–2005
7	(United States) Rosemary Casals (United States) Billie Jean King	0	0	5	2	1967–1974
7	(Czech Republic) **Barbora Krejčíková** (Czech Republic) **Kateřina Siniaková**	2	2	2	1	2018–2023
6	(France) Suzanne Lenglen (United States) Elizabeth Ryan	0	0	**6**	0	1919–1925
6	(United States) Sarah Palfrey Cooke (United States) Alice Marble	0	0	2	4	1937–1940
Top 10

== Grand Slam achievements ==
Grasscourt major	Claycourt major	Hardcourt major	Carpet court

=== Grand Slam ===
Players who held all four Grand Slam titles simultaneously (in a calendar year).

Period	Player	Australian Open	French Open	Wimbledon	US Open
**Amateur Era**	(Brazil) Maria Bueno (Note: With Christine Truman and Darlene Hard.)	1960	1960	1960	1960
**Open Era**	(United States) Martina Navratilova	1984	1984	1984	1984
**Open Era**	(United States) Pam Shriver	1984	1984	1984	1984
**Open Era**	(Switzerland) Martina Hingis (Note: With Mirjana Lučić and Jana Novotná.)	1998	1998	1998	1998

=== Non-calendar year Grand Slam ===
Players who held all four Grand Slam titles simultaneously (not in a calendar year).

Period	Player	From	To	Streak
Amateur Era	(United States) Louise Brough	1949 French Championships	1950 Australian Championships	4 (Note: with Margaret duPont and Doris Hart.)
Open Era	(United States) Martina Navratilova	1986 French Open	1987 French Open	5 (Note: 1986 French Open with Andrea Temesvári)
Open Era	(United States) Pam Shriver	1986 Wimbledon	1987 French Open	4
Open Era	(United States) Gigi Fernández	1992 French Open	1993 Wimbledon	6
Open Era	(Commonwealth of Independent States) / (Belarus) Natasha Zvereva	1992 French Open	1993 Wimbledon	6
Open Era	(Belarus) Natasha Zvereva (2)	1996 US Open	1997 Wimbledon	4 (Note: with Gigi Fernández and Martina Hingis.)
Open Era	(United States) Serena Williams	2009 Wimbledon	2010 French Open	4
Open Era	(United States) Venus Williams	2009 Wimbledon	2010 French Open	4

=== Career Grand Slam ===
Players who won all four Grand Slam titles over the course of their careers.

- The event at which the Career Grand Slam was completed indicated in **bold**.

==== Individual ====
Period	Player	Australian Open	French Open	Wimbledon	US Open
Amateur Era	(United States) Louise Brough Clapp	**1950**	1946	1946	1942
Amateur Era	(United States) Doris Hart	1949	1951	1951	**1951**
Amateur Era	(United States) Shirley Fry Irvin	**1957**	1950	1951	1951
Amateur Era	(Brazil) Maria Bueno	1960	1960	1958	**1960**
Amateur Era	(Australia) Margaret Court	1961	1964	**1964**	1963
Amateur Era	(Australia) Lesley Turner Bowrey	1964	1964	**1964**	1961
Open Era	(Australia) Margaret Court (2)	1962	1965	**1969**	1968
Open Era	(Australia) Judy Tegart-Dalton	1964	1966	1969	**1970**
Open Era	(Czechoslovakia) / (United States) Martina Navratilova	**1980**	1975	1976	1977
Open Era	(United States) Kathy Jordan	**1981**	1980	1980	1981
Open Era	(United States) Anne Smith	**1981**	1980	1980	1981
Open Era	(United States) Martina Navratilova (2)	1982	**1982**	1979	1978
Open Era	(United States) Martina Navratilova (3)	1983	**1984**	1981	1980
Open Era	(United States) Pam Shriver	1982	**1984**	1981	1983
Open Era	(United States) Martina Navratilova (4)	1984	**1985**	1982	1983
Open Era	(United States) Pam Shriver (2)	1983	**1985**	1982	1984
Open Era	(United States) Martina Navratilova (5)	1985	**1986**	1983	1984
Open Era	(United States) Martina Navratilova (6)	1987	**1987**	1984	1986
Open Era	(United States) Pam Shriver (3)	1984	**1987**	1983	1986
Open Era	(United States) Martina Navratilova (7)	1988	**1988**	1986	1987
Open Era	(United States) Pam Shriver (4)	1985	**1988**	1984	1987
Open Era	(Czechoslovakia) Helena Suková	1990	**1990**	1987	1985
Open Era	(United States) Gigi Fernández	**1993**	1991	1992	1988
Open Era	(Soviet Union) / (Commonwealth of Independent States) / (Belarus) Natasha Zvereva	**1993**	1989	1991	1991
Open Era	(United States) Gigi Fernández (2)	**1994**	1992	1993	1990
Open Era	(Commonwealth of Independent States) / (Belarus) Natasha Zvereva (2)	**1994**	1992	1992	1992
Open Era	(Czech Republic) Jana Novotná	1990	1990	1989	**1994**
Open Era	(Belarus) / (Belarus) Natasha Zvereva (3)	**1997**	1993	1993	1995
Open Era	(Czech Republic) Jana Novotná (2)	1995	1991	1990	**1997**
Open Era	(Switzerland) Martina Hingis	1997	1998	1996	**1998**
Open Era	(United States) Serena Williams	**2001**	1999	2000	1999
Open Era	(United States) Venus Williams	**2001**	1999	2000	1999
Open Era	(United States) Lisa Raymond	2000	**2006**	2001	2001
Open Era	(United States) Serena Williams (2)	2003	**2010**	2002	2009
Open Era	(United States) Venus Williams (2)	2003	**2010**	2002	2009
Open Era	(Italy) Roberta Vinci	2013	2012	**2014**	2012
Open Era	(Italy) Sara Errani	2013	2012	**2014**	2012
Open Era	(Switzerland) Martina Hingis (2)	1998	2000	1998	**2015**
Open Era	(Czech Republic) Barbora Krejčíková	2022	2018	2018	**2022**
Open Era	(Czech Republic) Kateřina Siniaková	2022	2018	2018	**2022**
Open Era	(Czech Republic) Kateřina Siniaková (2)	2023	2021	2022	**2026**
Open Era	(United States) Taylor Townsend	2025	2026	2024	**2026**

==== Team ====
Player	Australian Open	French Open	Wimbledon	US Open
(Australia) Judy Tegart-Dalton (Australia) Margaret Court	1969	1966	1969	**1970**
(United States) Anne Smith (United States) Kathy Jordan	**1981**	1980	1980	1981
(United States) Martina Navratilova (United States) Pam Shriver	1982	**1984**	1981	1983
(United States) Martina Navratilova (2) (United States) Pam Shriver (2)	1983	**1985**	1982	1984
(United States) Martina Navratilova (3) (United States) Pam Shriver (3)	1984	**1987**	1983	1986
(United States) Martina Navratilova (4) (United States) Pam Shriver (4)	1985	**1988**	1984	1987
(United States) Gigi Fernández (Commonwealth of Independent States) / (Belarus) Natasha Zvereva	**1993**	1992	1992	1992
(United States) Gigi Fernández (2) (Belarus) / (Belarus) Natasha Zvereva (2)	1994	1993	1993	**1995**
(United States) Serena Williams (United States) Venus Williams	**2001**	1999	2000	1999
(United States) Serena Williams (2) (United States) Venus Williams (2)	2003	**2010**	2002	2009
(Italy) Roberta Vinci (Italy) Sara Errani	2013	2012	**2014**	2012
(Czech Republic) Barbora Krejčíková (Czech Republic) Kateřina Siniaková	2022	2018	2018	**2022**
(Czech Republic) Kateřina Siniaková (2)^{†} (United States) Taylor Townsend	2025	2026	2024	**2026**

† - Only woman to complete the Career Grand Slam with multiple partners.

=== Career Golden Slam ===
Players who won all four Grand Slam titles and the Olympic gold medal over the course of their careers.

- The event at which the Career Golden Slam was completed indicated in **bold**.

==== Individual ====
Player	Australian Open	French Open	Wimbledon	US Open	Olympics
(United States) Pam Shriver	1982	1984	1981	1983	**1988**
(United States) Gigi Fernández	**1993**	1991	1992	1988	1992
(United States) Gigi Fernández (2)	1994	1992	1993	1990	**1996**
(United States) Serena Williams	**2001**	1999	2000	1999	2000
(United States) Venus Williams	**2001**	1999	2000	1999	2000
(United States) Serena Williams (2)	2003	**2010**	2002	2009	2008
(United States) Venus Williams (2)	2003	**2010**	2002	2009	2008
(Czech Republic) Barbora Krejčíková	2022	2018	2018	**2022**	2021
(Czech Republic) Kateřina Siniaková	2022	2018	2018	**2022**	2021
(Italy) Sara Errani	2013	2012	2014	2012	**2024**

==== Team ====
Player	Australian Open	French Open	Wimbledon	US Open	Olympics
(United States) Serena Williams (United States) Venus Williams	**2001**	1999	2000	1999	2000
(United States) Serena Williams (2) (United States) Venus Williams (2)	2003	**2010**	2002	2009	2008
(Czech Republic) Barbora Krejčíková (Czech Republic) Kateřina Siniaková	2022	2018	2018	**2022**	2021

=== Career Super Slam ===
Players who won all four Grand Slam titles, the Olympic gold medal and the year-end championship over the course of their careers.

- The event at which the Career Super Slam was completed indicated in **bold**.

==== Individual ====
Player	Australian Open	French Open	Wimbledon	US Open	Olympics	Year-end
(United States) Pam Shriver	1982	1984	1981	1983	**1988**	1981
(United States) Gigi Fernández	1993	1991	1992	1988	1992	**1993**
(United States) Gigi Fernández (2)	1994	1992	1993	1990	**1996**	1994
(Czech Republic) Barbora Krejčíková	2022	2018	2018	**2022**	2021	2021
(Czech Republic) Kateřina Siniaková	2022	2018	2018	**2022**	2021	2021

==== Team ====
Player	Australian Open	French Open	Wimbledon	US Open	Olympics	Year-end
(Czech Republic) Barbora Krejčíková (Czech Republic) Kateřina Siniaková	2022	2018	2018	**2022**	2021	2021

=== Career Surface Slam ===
Players who won Grand Slam titles on clay, grass and hard courts iover the course of their careers.

- The event at which the Career Surface Slam was completed indicated in **bold**

==== Individual ====
Player	Clay court slam	Hard court slam	Grass court slam
(United States) Billie Jean King	1972 French Open	**1978 US Open**	1966 Wimbledon Championships
(Czechoslovakia) / (United States) Martina Navratilova	1975 French Open	**1978 US Open**	1976 Wimbledon Championships
(Netherlands) Betty Stöve	1972 French Open	**1979 US Open**	1972 Wimbledon Championships
(Australia) Wendy Turnbull	1979 French Open	**1979 US Open**	1978 Wimbledon Championships
(United States) Martina Navratilova (2)	1977 US Open	**1980 US Open**	1979 Wimbledon Championships
(United States) Kathy Jordan	1980 French Open	**1981 US Open**	1980 Wimbledon Championships
(United States) Anne Smith	1980 French Open	**1981 US Open**	1980 Wimbledon Championships
(United States) Martina Navratilova (3)	1982 French Open	**1983 US Open**	1980 Australian Open
(United States) Pam Shriver	**1984 French Open**	1983 US Open	1981 Wimbledon Championships
(United States) Martina Navratilova (4)	1984 French Open	**1984 US Open**	1981 Wimbledon Championships
(United States) Pam Shriver (2)	**1985 French Open**	1984 US Open	1982 Wimbledon Championships
(United States) Martina Navratilova (5)	1985 French Open	**1986 US Open**	1982 Wimbledon Championships
(United States) Pam Shriver (3)	**1987 French Open**	1986 US Open	1982 Australian Open
(United States) Martina Navratilova (6)	1986 French Open	**1987 US Open**	1982 Australian Open
(United States) Martina Navratilova (7)	1987 French Open	**1988 Australian Open**	1983 Wimbledon Championships
(United States) Pam Shriver (4)	**1988 French Open**	1987 US Open	1983 Wimbledon Championships
(United States) Martina Navratilova (8)	1988 French Open	**1989 Australian Open**	1983 Australian Open
(Czechoslovakia) Helena Suková	**1990 French Open**	1985 US Open	1987 Wimbledon Championships
(Czechoslovakia) Jana Novotná	**1990 French Open**	1990 Australian Open	1989 Wimbledon Championships
(Soviet Union) Natasha Zvereva	1989 French Open	**1991 US Open**	1991 Wimbledon Championships
(United States) Gigi Fernández	1991 French Open	1988 US Open	**1992 Wimbledon Championships**
(Commonwealth of Independent States) Natasha Zvereva (2)	1992 French Open	**1992 US Open**	1992 Wimbledon Championships
(United States) Gigi Fernández (2)	1992 French Open	1990 US Open	**1993 Wimbledon Championships**
(Belarus) Natasha Zvereva (3)	1993 French Open	1993 Australian Open	**1993 Wimbledon Championships**
(United States) Gigi Fernández (3)	1993 French Open	1992 US Open	**1994 Wimbledon Championships**
(Belarus) Natasha Zvereva (4)	1994 French Open	1994 Australian Open	**1994 Wimbledon Championships**
(Czechoslovakia) / (Czech Republic) Jana Novotná (2)	1991 French Open	**1994 US Open**	1990 Wimbledon Championships
(United States) Gigi Fernández (4)	1994 French Open	1993 Australian Open	**1997 Wimbledon Championships**
(Belarus) / (Belarus) Natasha Zvereva (5)	1995 French Open	1995 US Open	**1997 Wimbledon Championships**
(Czechoslovakia) Jana Novotná (3)	**1998 French Open**	1995 Australian Open	1995 Wimbledon Championships
(Switzerland) Martina Hingis	**1998 French Open**	1997 Australian Open	1996 Wimbledon Championships
(United States) Lindsay Davenport	1996 French Open	1997 US Open	**1999 Wimbledon Championships**
(Switzerland) Martina Hingis (2)	**2000 French Open**	1998 Australian Open	1998 Wimbledon Championships
(United States) Serena Williams	1999 French Open	1999 US Open	**2000 Wimbledon Championships**
(United States) Venus Williams	1999 French Open	1999 US Open	**2000 Wimbledon Championships**
(Japan) Ai Sugiyama	2003 French Open	2000 US Open	**2003 Wimbledon Championships**
(United States) Lisa Raymond	**2006 French Open**	2000 Australian Open	2001 Wimbledon Championships
(United States) Serena Williams (2)	**2010 French Open**	2001 Australian Open	2002 Wimbledon Championships
(United States) Venus Williams (2)	**2010 French Open**	2001 Australian Open	2002 Wimbledon Championships
(Italy) Sara Errani	2012 French Open	2012 US Open	**2014 Wimbledon Championships**
(Italy) Roberta Vinci	2012 French Open	2012 US Open	**2014 Wimbledon Championships**
(Russia) Ekaterina Makarova	2013 French Open	2014 US Open	**2017 Wimbledon Championships**
(Russia) Elena Vesnina	2013 French Open	2014 US Open	**2017 Wimbledon Championships**
(Czech Republic) Barbora Krejčíková	2018 French Open	**2022 Australian Open**	2018 Wimbledon Championships
(Czech Republic) Kateřina Siniaková	2018 French Open	**2022 Australian Open**	2018 Wimbledon Championships
(Czech Republic) Barbora Krejčíková (2)	2021 French Open	**2022 US Open**	2022 Wimbledon Championships
(Czech Republic) Kateřina Siniaková (2)	2021 French Open	**2022 US Open**	2022 Wimbledon Championships
(Chinese Taipei) Hsieh Su-wei	2014 French Open	**2024 Australian Open**	2013 Wimbledon Championships
(Czech Republic) Kateřina Siniaková (3)	2024 French Open	2023 Australian Open	**2024 Wimbledon Championships**
(United States) Taylor Townsend	**2026 French Open**	2025 Australian Open	2024 Wimbledon Championships
(France) Kristina Mladenovic	2016 French Open	2018 Australian Open	**2026 Wimbledon Championships**

==== Team ====
Player	Clay court slam	Hard court slam	Grass court slam
(United States) Kathy Jordan (United States) Anne Smith	1980 French Open	**1981 US Open**	1980 Wimbledon Championships
(United States) Martina Navratilova (United States) Pam Shriver	**1984 French Open**	1983 US Open	1981 Wimbledon Championships
(United States) Martina Navratilova (United States) Pam Shriver (2)	**1985 French Open**	1984 US Open	1982 Wimbledon Championships
(United States) Martina Navratilova (United States) Pam Shriver (3)	**1987 French Open**	1986 US Open	1982 Australian Open
(United States) Martina Navratilova (United States) Pam Shriver (4)	**1988 French Open**	1987 US Open	1983 Wimbledon Championships
(Czechoslovakia) Jana Novotná (Czechoslovakia) Helena Suková	**1990 French Open**	1990 Australian Open	1989 Wimbledon Championships
(United States) Gigi Fernández (Commonwealth of Independent States) Natasha Zvereva	1992 French Open	**1992 US Open**	1992 Wimbledon Championships
(United States) Gigi Fernández (Belarus) Natasha Zvereva (2)	1993 French Open	1993 Australian Open	**1993 Wimbledon Championships**
(United States) Gigi Fernández (Belarus) Natasha Zvereva (3)	1994 French Open	1994 Australian Open	**1994 Wimbledon Championships**
(United States) Gigi Fernández (Belarus) / (Belarus) Natasha Zvereva (4)	1995 French Open	1995 Australian Open	**1997 Wimbledon Championships**
(Switzerland) Martina Hingis (Czechoslovakia) Jana Novotná	1998 French Open	**1998 US Open**	1998 Wimbledon Championships
(United States) Serena Williams (United States) Venus Williams	1999 French Open	1999 US Open	**2000 Wimbledon Championships**
(United States) Serena Williams (United States) Venus Williams (2)	**2010 French Open**	2001 Australian Open	2002 Wimbledon Championships
(Italy) Sara Errani (Italy) Roberta Vinci	2012 French Open	2012 US Open	**2014 Wimbledon Championships**
(Russia) Ekaterina Makarova (Russia) Elena Vesnina	2013 French Open	2014 US Open	**2017 Wimbledon Championships**
(Czech Republic) Barbora Krejčíková (Czech Republic) Kateřina Siniaková	2018 French Open	**2022 Australian Open**	2018 Wimbledon Championships
(Czech Republic) Barbora Krejčíková (Czech Republic) Kateřina Siniaková (2)	2021 French Open	**2022 US Open**	2022 Wimbledon Championships
(Czech Republic) Kateřina Siniaková (United States) Taylor Townsend	**2026 French Open**	2025 Australian Open	2024 Wimbledon Championships

== Multiples titles in a season ==
♠ Player won all four major tournaments in the same year.

=== Three titles ===
★ Surface Slam (major titles on 3 different surfaces in the same season). (Note: The US Open switched to hard in 1978, and the Australian Open was played on grass until 1987.)

Australian—French—Wimbledon
1960^{♠}	(Brazil) Maria Bueno
1964	(Australia) Lesley Turner Bowrey
Open Era
1982	(United States) Martina Navratilova
1984^{♠}	(United States) Martina Navratilova (United States) Pam Shriver
1990^{★}	(Czech Republic) Jana Novotná (Czech Republic) Helena Suková
1993^{★}	(United States) Gigi Fernández (Belarus) Natasha Zvereva
1994^{★}	(United States) Gigi Fernández (Belarus) Natasha Zvereva
1997^{★}	(Belarus) Natasha Zvereva
1998^{♠★}	(Switzerland) Martina Hingis

Australian—French—U.S.
1960^{♠}	(Brazil) Maria Bueno
Open Era
1973	(Australia) Margaret Court (United Kingdom) Virginia Wade
1984^{♠★}	(United States) Martina Navratilova (United States) Pam Shriver
1987^{★}	(United States) Martina Navratilova (United States) Pam Shriver
1998^{♠}	(Switzerland) Martina Hingis
2004	(Spain) Virginia Ruano Pascual (Argentina) Paola Suárez

Australian—Wimbledon—U.S.
1950	(United States) Louise Brough
1960^{♠}	(Brazil) Maria Bueno
Open Era
1983	(United States) Martina Navratilova (United States) Pam Shriver
1984^{♠}	(United States) Martina Navratilova (United States) Pam Shriver
1998^{♠}	(Switzerland) Martina Hingis
2009	(United States) Serena Williams (United States) Venus Williams
2022	(Czech Republic) Barbora Krejčíková (Czech Republic) Kateřina Siniaková

French—Wimbledon—U.S.
1946	(United States) Louise Brough (United States) Margaret Osborne duPont
1949	(United States) Louise Brough (United States) Margaret Osborne duPont
1951	(United States) Shirley Fry (United States) Doris Hart
1952	(United States) Shirley Fry (United States) Doris Hart
1953	(United States) Shirley Fry (United States) Doris Hart
1960	(Brazil) Maria Bueno^{♠} (United States) Darlene Hard
Open Era
1972	(Netherlands) Betty Stöve
1984^{♠★}	(United States) Martina Navratilova (United States) Pam Shriver
1986^{★}	(United States) Martina Navratilova (Note: Australian Open was not held in 1986 due to change of schedule.)
1992^{★}	(United States) Gigi Fernández (Commonwealth of Independent States) Natasha Zvereva
1998^{★}	(Switzerland) Martina Hingis^{♠} (Czech Republic) Jana Novotná

=== Two titles ===
● Three-Quarter Slam (3 major titles in the same year).
‡ Channel Slam (French and Wimbledon title double).

Australian—French
1950	(United States) Doris Hart
1959	(South Africa) Renee Schuurman (South Africa) Sandra Reynolds
1960^{♠}	(Brazil) Maria Bueno
1964^{●}	(Australia) Lesley Turner Bowrey
1965	(Australia) Margaret Court (Australia) Lesley Turner Bowrey
Open Era
1973^{●}	(Australia) Margaret Court (United Kingdom) Virginia Wade
1982^{●}	(United States) Martina Navratilova
1984^{♠}	(United States) Martina Navratilova (United States) Pam Shriver
1985	(United States) Martina Navratilova (United States) Pam Shriver
1987^{●}	(United States) Martina Navratilova (United States) Pam Shriver
1988	(United States) Martina Navratilova (United States) Pam Shriver
1990^{●}	(Czech Republic) Jana Novotná (Czech Republic) Helena Suková
1993^{●}	(United States) Gigi Fernández (Belarus) Natasha Zvereva
1994^{●}	(United States) Gigi Fernández (Belarus) Natasha Zvereva
1997^{●}	(Belarus) Natasha Zvereva
1998^{♠}	(Switzerland) Martina Hingis
2004^{●}	(Spain) Virginia Ruano Pascual (Argentina) Paola Suárez
2010	(United States) Serena Williams (United States) Venus Williams
2015	(United States) Bethanie Mattek-Sands (Czech Republic) Lucie Šafářová
2017	(United States) Bethanie Mattek-Sands (Czech Republic) Lucie Šafářová
2020	(Hungary) Tímea Babos (France) Kristina Mladenovic

Australian—Wimbledon
1950^{●}	(United States) Louise Brough
1957	(United States) Althea Gibson
1960^{♠}	(Brazil) Maria Bueno
1964^{●}	(Australia) Lesley Turner Bowrey
Open Era
1969	(Australia) Margaret Court (Australia) Judy Tegart-Dalton
1974	(Australia) Evonne Goolagong Cawley (United States) Peggy Michel
1977	(Australia) Helen Cawley (Note: Helen Cawley won both editions of the Australian Open in 1977, in January and December, sharing the latter with Mona Guerrant and Kerry Melville due to a rainout.)
1982	(United States) Martina Navratilova^{●} (United States) Pam Shriver
1983^{●}	(United States) Martina Navratilova^{●} (United States) Pam Shriver
1984^{♠}	(United States) Martina Navratilova^{●} (United States) Pam Shriver
1990^{●}	(Czech Republic) Jana Novotná (Czech Republic) Helena Suková
1993^{●}	(United States) Gigi Fernández (Belarus) Natasha Zvereva
1994^{●}	(United States) Gigi Fernández (Belarus) Natasha Zvereva
1995	(Czech Republic) Jana Novotná (Spain) Arantxa Sánchez Vicario
1997^{●}	(Belarus) Natasha Zvereva
1998^{♠}	(Switzerland) Martina Hingis
2006	(China) Yan Zi (China) Zheng Jie
2007	(Zimbabwe) Cara Black (South Africa) Liezel Huber
2009^{●}	(United States) Serena Williams (United States) Venus Williams
2014	(Italy) Sara Errani (Italy) Roberta Vinci
2021	(Belgium) Elise Mertens
2022^{●}	(Czech Republic) Barbora Krejčíková (Czechoslovakia) Kateřina Siniaková

Australian—U.S.
1950^{●}	(United States) Louise Brough
1960^{♠}	(Brazil) Maria Bueno
1963	(Australia) Margaret Court (Australia) Robyn Ebbern
1966	(United States) Nancy Richey
Open Era
1970	(Australia) Margaret Court (Australia) Judy Tegart-Dalton
1973^{●}	(Australia) Margaret Court (United Kingdom) Virginia Wade
1980	(United States) Martina Navratilova
1981	(United States) Kathy Jordan (United States) Anne Smith
1983^{●}	(United States) Martina Navratilova (United States) Pam Shriver
1984^{♠}	(United States) Martina Navratilova (United States) Pam Shriver
1987^{●}	(United States) Martina Navratilova (United States) Pam Shriver
1989	(United States) Martina Navratilova
1998^{♠}	(Switzerland) Martina Hingis
2004^{●}	(Spain) Virginia Ruano Pascual (Argentina) Paola Suárez
2009^{●}	(United States) Serena Williams (United States) Venus Williams
2022^{●}	(Czech Republic) Barbora Krejčíková (Czech Republic) Kateřina Siniaková

French—Wimbledon ‡
1925	(France) Suzanne Lenglen
1928	(United Kingdom) Phoebe Holcroft Watson
1930	(United States) Elizabeth Ryan (United States) Helen Wills
1933	(United States) Elizabeth Ryan (France) Simonne Mathieu
1934	(United States) Elizabeth Ryan (France) Simonne Mathieu
1935	(United Kingdom) Kay Stammers
1937	(France) Simonne Mathieu (United Kingdom) Billie Yorke
1946^{●}	(United States) Louise Brough (United States) Margaret Osborne duPont
1949^{●}	(United States) Louise Brough (United States) Margaret Osborne duPont
1951^{●}	(United States) Shirley Fry (United States) Doris Hart
1952^{●}	(United States) Shirley Fry (United States) Doris Hart
1953^{●}	(United States) Shirley Fry (United States) Doris Hart
1956	(United Kingdom) Angela Buxton (United States) Althea Gibson
1957	(United States) Darlene Hard
1960	(Brazil) Maria Bueno^{♠} (United States) Darlene Hard
1964	(Australia) Lesley Turner Bowrey^{●} (Australia) Margaret Court
Open Era
1972	(Netherlands) Betty Stöve^{●} (United States) Billie Jean King
1980	(United States) Kathy Jordan (United States) Anne Smith
1982^{●}	(United States) Martina Navratilova
1984^{♠}	(United States) Martina Navratilova (United States) Pam Shriver
1986^{●}	(United States) Martina Navratilova
1990^{●}	(Czech Republic) Jana Novotná (Czech Republic) Helena Suková
1992^{●}	(United States) Gigi Fernández (Commonwealth of Independent States) / (Belarus) / (Belarus) Natasha Zvereva^{●}
1993^{●}	(United States) Gigi Fernández (Commonwealth of Independent States) / (Belarus) / (Belarus) Natasha Zvereva^{●}
1994^{●}	(United States) Gigi Fernández (Commonwealth of Independent States) / (Belarus) / (Belarus) Natasha Zvereva^{●}
1997	(United States) Gigi Fernández (Commonwealth of Independent States) / (Belarus) / (Belarus) Natasha Zvereva^{●}
1998	(Switzerland) Martina Hingis^{♠} (Czech Republic) Jana Novotná^{●}
2003	(Belgium) Kim Clijsters (Japan) Ai Sugiyama
2018	(Czech Republic) Barbora Krejčíková (Czech Republic) Kateřina Siniaková
2023	(Chinese Taipei) Hsieh Su-wei
2024	(Czech Republic) Kateřina Siniaková

French—U.S.
1931	(United Kingdom) Eileen Bennett (United States) Betty Nuthall
1946^{●}	(United States) Louise Brough (United States) Margaret Osborne duPont
1947	(United States) Louise Brough (United States) Margaret Osborne duPont
1949^{●}	(United States) Louise Brough (United States) Margaret Osborne duPont
1951^{●}	(United States) Shirley Fry (United States) Doris Hart
1952^{●}	(United States) Shirley Fry (United States) Doris Hart
1953^{●}	(United States) Shirley Fry (United States) Doris Hart
1960	(Brazil) Maria Bueno^{♠} (United States) Darlene Hard
Open Era
1969	(France) Françoise Dürr
1972^{●}	(Netherlands) Betty Stöve
1973^{●}	(Australia) Margaret Court (United Kingdom) Virginia Wade
1979	(Netherlands) Betty Stöve (Australia) Wendy Turnbull
1984^{♠}	(United States) Martina Navratilova (United States) Pam Shriver
1986^{●}	(United States) Martina Navratilova
1987^{●}	(United States) Martina Navratilova (United States) Pam Shriver
1992^{●}	(United States) Gigi Fernández (Commonwealth of Independent States) / (Belarus) Natasha Zvereva
1995	(United States) Gigi Fernández (Commonwealth of Independent States) / (Belarus) Natasha Zvereva
1998	(Switzerland) Martina Hingis^{♠} (Czech Republic) Jana Novotná^{●}
1999	(United States) Serena Williams (United States) Venus Williams
2002	(Spain) Virginia Ruano Pascual (Argentina) Paola Suárez
2004^{●}	(Spain) Virginia Ruano Pascual (Argentina) Paola Suárez
2012	(Italy) Sara Errani (Italy) Roberta Vinci
2026	(Czech Republic) Kateřina Siniaková (United States) Taylor Townsend

Wimbledon—U.S.
1924	(United States) Hazel Hotchkiss Wightman (United States) Helen Wills
1926	(United States) Elizabeth Ryan
1929	(United Kingdom) Phoebe Holcroft Watson (United Kingdom) Peggy Saunders
1938	(United States) Sarah Palfrey Cooke (United States) Alice Marble
1939	(United States) Sarah Palfrey Cooke (United States) Alice Marble
1946^{●}	(United States) Louise Brough^{●} (United States) Margaret Osborne duPont
1948	(United States) Louise Brough^{●} (United States) Margaret Osborne duPont
1949^{●}	(United States) Louise Brough^{●} (United States) Margaret Osborne duPont
1950	(United States) Louise Brough^{●} (United States) Margaret Osborne duPont
1951^{●}	(United States) Shirley Fry (United States) Doris Hart
1952^{●}	(United States) Shirley Fry (United States) Doris Hart
1953^{●}	(United States) Shirley Fry (United States) Doris Hart
1959	(United States) Jeanne Arth (United States) Darlene Hard
1960	(Brazil) Maria Bueno^{♠} (United States) Darlene Hard
1965	(United States) Nancy Richey
1966	(Brazil) Maria Bueno
1967	(United States) Rosemary Casals (United States) Billie Jean King
Open Era
1971	(United States) Rosemary Casals
1972^{●}	(Netherlands) Betty Stöve
1983^{●}	(United States) Martina Navratilova^{●} (United States) Pam Shriver
1984^{♠}	(United States) Martina Navratilova^{●} (United States) Pam Shriver
1986	(United States) Martina Navratilova^{●} (United States) Pam Shriver
1991	(Soviet Union) Natasha Zvereva
1992^{●}	(United States) Gigi Fernández (Commonwealth of Independent States) Natasha Zvereva
1998	(Switzerland) Martina Hingis^{♠} (Czech Republic) Jana Novotná^{●}
2001	(United States) Lisa Raymond (Australia) Rennae Stubbs
2009^{●}	(United States) Serena Williams (United States) Venus Williams
2010	(United States) Vania King (Kazakhstan) Yaroslava Shvedova
2015	(Switzerland) Martina Hingis (India) Sania Mirza
2022^{●}	(Czech Republic) Barbora Krejčíková (Czech Republic) Kateřina Siniaková

== Tournament stats ==
=== Most titles per tournament ===
Tournament	Titles	Player
Australian Open	12	(Australia) Thelma Coyne Long
French Open	7	(United States) Martina Navratilova
Wimbledon	12	(United States) Elizabeth Ryan
US Open	13	(United States) Margaret Osborne duPont

== Most consecutive titles ==
AO Australian Open	WIM Wimbledon
FO French Open	USO US Open

=== Overall record ===
==== Per player ====
Titles	Player	First event	Last event
8	(United States) Martina Navratilova	1983 WIM	1985 FO
8	(United States) Pam Shriver	1983 WIM	1985 FO
6	(United States) Gigi Fernández	1992 FO	1993 WIM
6	(Commonwealth of Independent States) / (Belarus) Natasha Zvereva	1992 FO	1993 WIM
5	(United States) Martina Navratilova (2)	1986 FO	1987 FO
5	(Switzerland) Martina Hingis	1998 AO	1999 AO

==== Per team ====
Titles	Player	First event	Last event
8	(United States) Martina Navratilova (United States) Pam Shriver	1983 WIM	1985 FO
6	(United States) Gigi Fernández (Commonwealth of Independent States) / (Belarus) Natasha Zvereva	1992 FO	1993 WIM
4	(United States) Serena Williams (United States) Venus Williams	2009 WIM	2010 FO

=== At one tournament ===
==== Per player ====
Titles	Player	Tourn.	Years
10	(United States) Margaret Osborne duPont	WIM	1941–50
6	(United States) Elizabeth Ryan	WIM	1914–23 (Note: Ongoing streak, interrupted by World War I.)
5	(United States) Juliette Atkinson	USO	1894–98
5	(United States) Martina Navratilova	FO	1984–88
5	(United States) Gigi Fernández	FO	1991–95

==== Per team ====
Titles	Team	Tourn.	Years
9	(United States) Louise Brough Clapp (United States) Margaret Osborne duPont	WIM	1942–50 (Note: Ongoing streak, interrupted by World War II.)
7	(United States) Martina Navratilova (United States) Pam Shriver	AO	1982–89 (Note: 1986 Australian Open was not held due to scheduling change.)
5	(France) Suzanne Lenglen (United States) Elizabeth Ryan	WIM	1919–23
5	(Australia) Thelma Coyne Long (Australia) Nancye Wynne Bolton	AO	1936–40

== Grand slam titles by decade ==
as of 2026 US Open.

1880s

1	Ballard, B. Townsend

1890s

5	J. Atkinson

2	K. Atkinson, Cahill, Hellwig

1	Butler, Craven, Leavitt-Morgan, McAteer, McKinlay, Moore, E. Roosevelt, G. Roosevelt, Terry

1900s

3	Neely

2	J. Atkinson

1	Bliss Platt, Champlin, Coe, Curtis, Hall, Homans, Hotchkiss Wightman, Jones, McAteer, Moore, Rotch, Parker, Ev. Sears, Sutton Bundy, Wimer

1910s

4	El. Sears

3	Browne, Hotchkiss Wightman

2	Bjurstedt, Goss, Riddell Williams, Ryan, Zinderstein Jessup

1	Boothby, Green, Lenglen, McNair, Morton, Rotch

1920s

8	Ryan

7	Lenglen

6	Wills Moody

4	Akhurst Cozens, Boyd Robertson, Holcroft Watson

3	Browne, Hotchkiss Wightman, Lance Harper, Saunders

2	Bickerton, Goss, McKane Godfree, O'Hara Wood, Vlasto, Zinderstein Jessup

1	Álvarez, Bennett Whittingstall, Bouman, Bowder Peacock, Covell, Harvey, Heine, Mountain, Riddell Williams

1930s

9	Mathieu, Palfrey Cooke

7	Ryan

5	Marble

4	Coyne Long, Nuthall Shoemaker, Wynne Bolton, Yorke

3	Hood Westacott, Jacobs, James, Molesworth, Stammers Bullitt, Wills Moody

2	Bennett Whittingstall

1	Akhurst Cozens, Babcock, Barron, Bickerton Cozens, Buttsworth, Cox Crawford, Dearman, Gladman Van Ryn, Jędrzejwoska, Lyle, Metaxa, Mudford, Scriven Vivian, Sigart

1940s

15	Osborne duPont

14	Brough Clapp

4	Coyne Long, Wynne Bolton

2	Canning Todd, Hart, Palfrey Cooke

1	Bevis Hawton, Fitch, Marble

1950s

12	Fry Irvin, Hart

7	Brough Clapp

6	Hard, Osborne duPont

5	Gibson

4	Bevis Hawton, Coyne Long

3	Arth

2	Buxton, Connolly Brinker, Penrose, Reynolds Price, Schuurman Haygarth, Wynne Bolton

1	Baker Fleitz, Bloomer Brasher, Bueno, Hall Hopman, Mortimer Barrett, Ramírez Ochoa, Reyes Darmon, Sampson Hayward, Shilcock

1960s

12	Court

10	Bueno

7	Hard, B.J. King, Turner Bowrey

5	Tegart-Dalton

4	Dürr, Richey Gunter

3	Casals, Ebbern, Hantze Susman, Haydon-Jones, Schuurman Haygarth

2	Caldwell Graebner, Reynolds Price

1	Carter Reitano, Krantzcke, Melville Reid, Sherriff Chanfreau Lovera, Truman Janes

1970s

8	B.J. King

7	Court

6	Goolagong Cawley, Stöve

5	Casals, Gourlay Cawley, Navratilova

4	Wade

3	Dürr, Evert, Michel, Sherriff Chanfreau Lovera, Tegart-Dalton, Turnbull

2	Melville Reid

1	Bonicelli, Boshoff, Connor, Evers, Fromholtz Balestrat, Guerrant, Harris, Jaušovec, Kiyomura, Kloss, Maršíková, Morozova, Nagelsen, Russell, Ruzici, Sawamatsu, Teeguarden, Tomanová

1980s

25	Navratilova

20	Shriver

5	Jordan, Smith

3	Suková

2	Fairbank Nideffer, Kohde-Kilsch

1	Casals, G. Fernández, Graf, Harford, B.J. King, Mandlíková, Nagelsen, Novotná, Reynolds, Sabatini, Savchenko Neiland, Sayers Smylie, Temesvári, Turnbull, White, Zvereva

1990s

17	Zvereva

16	G. Fernández

11	Novotná

7	Hingis

6	Sánchez Vicario, Suková

3	Davenport

2	M.J. Fernandez, S. Williams, V. Williams

1	Fendick, Kournikova, Lučić, Morariu, Navratilova, Rubin, Savchenko Neiland, Shriver

2000s

10	Ruano Pascual

8	Suárez, S. Williams, V. Williams

5	Black, Raymond

4	Huber, Stubbs

3	Sugiyama

2	Clijsters, Dechy, Hingis, Medina Garrigues, Molik, Stosur, Yan, Zheng

1	A. Bondarenko, K. Bondarenko, Halard-Decugis, Kournikova, Kuznetsova, Pierce, Safina, Santangelo, Zvonareva

2010s

5	Errani, Mattek-Sands, Šafářová, Vinci

4	Hingis, S. Williams, V. Williams

3	Hsieh, Makarova, Mirza, Mladenovic, Vesnina

2	Babos, Hlaváčková, Hradecká, V. King, Krejčíková, Peng, Shvedova, Siniaková

1	Barty, Chan, Dulko, Garcia, Huber, Kuznetsova, Mertens, Pennetta, Peschke, Raymond, Sabalenka, Srebotnik, Stosur, Strýcová, Vandeweghe, Zhang, Zvonareva

2020s

10	Siniaková

5	Krejčíková, Mertens

4	Hsieh, Mladenovic, T. Townsend

2	Babos, Dabrowski, Routliffe, Zhang

1	Errani, Garcia, Gauff, Guo, Kichenok, Kudermetova, Ostapenko, Paolini, Sabalenka, Siegemund, Stosur, Strýcová, Wang, Zvonareva

== Grand Slam titles by country ==
Note: Titles, won by a team of players from same country, count as one title, not two.

=== All-time ===
as of 2026 US Open.

241	United States (85 players)

81	Australia (36 players)

42	Czechoslovakia / Czech Republic (12 players)

37	France (11 players)

35	Great Britain (26 players)

17	Soviet Union / CIS / Russia (9 players) (Note: On 1 March 2022, the WTA announced that players from Russia will not be allowed to compete under the name or flag of Russia following the 2022 Russian invasion of Ukraine. Veronika Kudermetova thus competed as neutral player since then and her first and only title is not attributed to Russia in the "Grand Slam titles by country" list.), Spain (4 players)

14	Belarus (2 players)

13	Switzerland (1 player)

12	South Africa (9 players)

11	Brazil (1 player)

10	Argentina (3 players)

9	Belgium (3 players), China (6 players)

8	Chinese Taipei (2 players), Italy (5 players)

7	Netherlands (2 players)

5	Hungary (2 players), Zimbabwe (1 player)

4	West Germany / Germany (3 players), Japan (2 players)

3	India (1 player), New Zealand (2 players)

2	Canada (1 player), Kazakhstan (1 player), Norway (1 player), Ukraine (3 players)

1	Croatia, Latvia, Mexico (2 players), Poland, Romania, Slovenia, Uruguay, Yugoslavia

=== Open Era ===
as of 2026 US Open.

112	United States (31 players)

42	Czechoslovakia / Czech Republic (12 players)

38	Australia (15 players)

18	France (7 players)

17	Soviet Union / CIS / Russia (9 players)

16	Spain (3 players)

14	Belarus (2 players)

13	Switzerland (1 player)

10	Argentina (3 players)

9	China (6 players)

8	Belgium (2 players), Chinese Taipei (2 players), Italy (5 players)

6	Great Britain (2 players), Netherlands (1 player), South Africa (5 players)

5	Hungary (2 players), Zimbabwe (1 player)

4	West Germany / Germany (3 players), Japan (2 players)

3	India (1 player), New Zealand (2 players)

2	Canada (1 player), Kazakhstan (1 player), Ukraine (3 players)

1	Brazil, Croatia, Latvia, Romania, Slovenia, Uruguay, Yugoslavia

== See also ==
- List of Grand Slam–related tennis records
- List of Grand Slam men's singles champions
- List of Grand Slam women's singles champions
- List of Grand Slam men's doubles champions
- List of Grand Slam mixed doubles champions
