= 1906 U.S. National Championships (tennis) =

- Date: August 21–29 (M); June 19–23 (W)
- Edition: 26th
- Category: Grand Slam
- Surface: Grass
- Location: Newport, R.I., United States (M); Philadelphia, PA, United States (W)

Champions

Men's singles
- (United States) William Clothier

Women's singles
- (United States) Helen Homans

Men's doubles
- (United States) Holcombe Ward / (United States) Beals Wright

Women's doubles
- (United States) Ann Burdette Coe / (United States) Ethel Bliss Platt

Mixed doubles
- (United States) Sarah Coffin / (Australia) Edward Dewhurst
- U.S. National Championships

The 1906 U.S. National Championships tennis tournament (now known as the US Open) was a tennis tournament that took place in June and August of 1906. The women's tournament was held from June 19 to June 23 on the outdoor grass courts at the Philadelphia Cricket Club in Philadelphia, Pennsylvania. The men's tournament was held from August 21 to August 29 on the outdoor grass courts at the Newport Casino in Newport, Rhode Island. It was the 26th U.S. National Championships and the second Grand Slam tournament of the three played that year.

== Finals ==
=== Men's singles ===
(United States) William Clothier defeated (United States) Beals Wright 6–3, 6–0, 6–4

=== Women's singles ===
(United States) Helen Homans defeated (United States) Maud Barger-Wallach 6–4, 6–3

=== Men's doubles ===
(United States) Holcombe Ward (USA) / (United States) Beals Wright (USA) defeated (United States) Fred Alexander (USA) / (United States) Harold Hackett (USA) 6–3, 3–6, 6–3, 6–3

=== Women's doubles ===
(United States) Ann Burdette Coe (USA) / (United States) Ethel Bliss Platt (USA) defeated (United States) Helen Homans (USA) / (United States) Clover Boldt (USA) 6–4, 6–4

=== Mixed doubles ===
(United States) Sarah Coffin (USA) / (Australia) Edward Dewhurst (AUS) defeated (United States) Margaret Johnson (USA) / (United States) J.B. Johnson (USA) 6–3, 7–5

Preceded by 1906 Wimbledon Championships	Grand Slams	Succeeded by 1906 Australasian Championships
