= 1906 U.S. National Championships – Women's singles =

Women's singles
- 1906 U.S. National Championships

Final
- Champion: (United States) Helen Homans
- Runner-up: (United States) Maud Barger-Wallach
- Score: 6–4, 6–3

Details
- Draw: 34
- Seeds: –

Events
Singles	men	women
Doubles	men	women
- U.S. National Championships

Helen Homans won the singles tennis title of the 1906 U.S. Women's National Singles Championship by defeating Maud Barger-Wallach 6–4, 6–3 in the final of the All Comers' tournament. Elisabeth Moore was the reigning champion but did not defend her title in the Challenge Round. The event was played on outdoor grass courts and held at the Philadelphia Cricket Club in Wissahickon Heights, Chestnut Hill, Philadelphia from June 19 through June 23, 1906.

== Draw ==
=== All Comers' finals ===
Quarterfinals
(United States) Helen Homans	4	6	6
(United States) Rachel Harlan	6	4	4
(United States) Clover Boldt	1	6	0
(United States) Edith Rotch	6	4	6
(United States) Gertrude Fetterman	1	2
(United States) Bertha Townsend Toulmin	6	6
(United States) Maud Barger-Wallach	6	6
(United States) Annetta McCall	1	0

Semifinals
(United States) Helen Homans	6	6
(United States) Edith Rotch	2	3
(United States) Bertha Townsend Toulmin	2	3
(United States) Maud Barger-Wallach	6	6

Finals
(United States) Helen Homans	6	6
(United States) Maud Barger-Wallach	4	3

Preceded by 1906 Wimbledon Championships – Women's singles	Grand Slam women's singles	Succeeded by 1907 Wimbledon Championships – Women's singles
