= Edward Dewhurst =

Australian-American tennis player

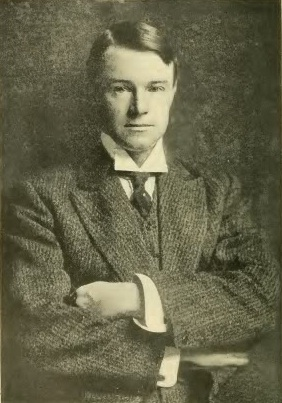
- Full name: Edward Bury Dewhurst
- Country (sports): Australia
- Born: 7 April 1870; Sydney, New South Wales
- Died: 25 February 1941 (aged 70); Philadelphia, Pennsylvania
- Height: 5'6 1/2"
- Plays: Right-handed

Singles
- Highest ranking: No. 9 (1906 U.S. Ranking)

Grand Slam singles results
- US Open: 3R (1904)

Grand Slam mixed doubles results
- US Open: W (1906)

Edward Bury Dewhurst (7 April 1870 – 25 February 1941) was an Australian male tennis player. He became a U.S. citizen after retirement.

== Biography ==
Edward Bury Dewhurst was born in Sydney, Australia in 1870, the son of Arthur Dewhurst and Emma Owen. At age 33, in 1903, he left Australia to study dentistry at the University of Pennsylvania in the United States.

Dewhurst became the singles Intercollegiate Champion for the University of Pennsylvania in 1903 and 1905 as well as doubles champion in 1905. In 1904 he was runner up in the singles. In 1904 he won the men's doubles at the Niagara International Tennis Tournament together with H.J. Holt when their opponents defaulted the match at two sets all due to darkness.

He won the singles title at the 1905 U.S. National Indoor Tennis Championships where he defeated the reigning champion of the previous two years, Wylie Grant in three straight sets 6–3, 8–6, 6–4. The tournament was played on board courts at the Seventh Regiment Armory in New York.

In 1906, Dewhurst won the mixed doubles title at the U.S. National Championships together with Sarah Coffin. The previous year, 1905, he had reached the finals of this event, played at the Philadelphia Cricket Club, with Elisabeth Moore but lost to Augusta Schultz and Clarence Hobart in straight sets.

Dewhurst retired from tennis in 1909 due to blood poisoning.

Dewhurst published a book titled The Science of Lawn Tennis in 1910.

In 1911, he married Ethel Voorhies (née Grannan). He became a U.S. citizen in 1924.

He died in Philadelphia of heart disease in 1941, age 70.

== Grand Slam finals ==
=== Mixed doubles (1 title, 1 runner-up) ===
Outcome	Year	Championship	Surface	Partner	Opponents	Score
Runner-up	1905	U.S. Championships	Grass	(United States) Elisabeth Moore	(United States) Augusta Schultz (United States) Clarence Hobart	2–6, 4–6
Winner	1906	U.S. Championships	Grass	(United States) Sarah Coffin	(United States) Margaret Johnson (United States) J. B. Johnson	6–3, 7–5
