= Helen Homans =

American tennis player

Helen Homans McLean
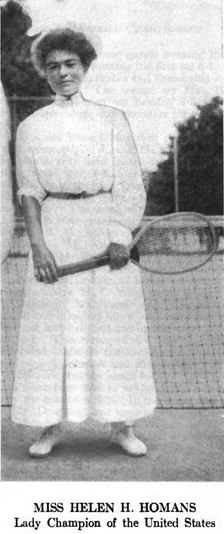
- Helen H. Homans, from a 1907 publication.
- Country (sports): United States
- Born: February 8, 1877 Englewood, New Jersey, USA
- Died: March 28, 1949 (aged 72) Bronxville, New York, USA

Singles

Grand Slam singles results
- US Open: W (1906)

Doubles

Grand Slam doubles results
- US Open: W (1905)

Mixed doubles

Grand Slam mixed doubles results
- US Open: SF (1905)

Helen Houston Homans McLean (February 8, 1877 – March 28, 1949) was an American tennis champion.

== Career ==
Homans won the women's doubles title at the 1905 U.S. National Championship and the singles title the next year.

Homans played mixed doubles with Marshall McLean as early as 1902 and married him in New York City in 1907. In mixed doubles, she reached the semifinals partnering Harry F. Allen in 1905.

Also in 1905, she reached the women's singles All-Comers final at Cincinnati before falling to May Sutton. (Sutton then defeated Myrtle McAteer in the Challenge Round to claim the title.) Homans won the 1905 women's doubles title in Cincinnati with McAteer, and was a 1905 mixed doubles finalist with Robert LeRoy.

In 1911, she won three of the New Jersey State Championships titles.

In 1913, she regained her title when she defeated Marie Wagner at the Morristown Field Club in Morristown, New Jersey. On September 19, 1913, she was defeated by Clare Cassell at the Montclair Athletic Club.

In 1915, Molla Bjurstedt of Norway, the national indoor champion, defeated McLean in the final round of the Class A tennis singles at the West Side Tennis Club. She finished second in the U.S. National Championships women's doubles with Augusta Bradley Chapman in 1915.

McLean was still ranked fourth in 1913 and third in 1915 in the U.S. national ranking. In 1915, she won the U.S. Indoor Championships.

After retiring from her career in tennis, she worked as an interior decorator.

== Personal life ==
She was married to Marshall McLean (1869–1952), a New York City attorney. They had one daughter and lived in Bronxville, New York. Helen Homans McLean died at their home in Bronxville on March 28, 1949.

== Grand Slam finals ==
=== Singles (1 title) ===
Result	Year	Championship	Surface	Opponent	Score
Win	1906	U.S. National Championships	Grass	(United States) Maud Barger-Wallach	6–4, 6–3

=== Doubles (1 title, 2 runners-up) ===
Result	Year	Championship	Surface	Partner	Opponents	Score
Win	1905	U.S. National Championships	Grass	(United States) Carrie Neely	(United States) Marjorie Oberteuffer (United States) Virginia Maule	6–0, 6–1
Loss	1906	U.S. National Championships	Grass	(United States) Louise Clover Boldt	(United States) Ethel Bliss Platt (United States) Ann Burdette Coe	4–6, 4–6
Loss	1915	U.S. National Championships	Grass	(United States) Augusta Bradley Chapman	(United States) Hazel Hotchkiss Wightman (United States) Eleonora Sears	8–10, 2–6
