= Ethel Bliss Platt =

American tennis player and art collector

- Born: Ethel Bliss; October 25, 1881; Englewood, New Jersey, United States
- Died: June 1971 (aged 89); Englewood, New Jersey, United States
- Known for: U.S. National Tennis Champion (1906) and art collector
- Spouse: Dan Fellows Platt

Ethel Bliss Platt was an American tennis player and art collector. Ethel was born and spent most of her life living in Englewood, New Jersey. She had an active junior tennis career and was the 1906 U.S. National Tennis Champion in Doubles with Ann Burdette Coe. She married Dan Fellows Platt in 1900 and was his companion through many trips to Europe to collect art. When her husband died in 1937, she inherited one of the largest art collections in America and sold some pieces, gave some to friends and gave thousands to Princeton University Art Museum. She died in 1971 following a stroke.

== Birth ==
Ethel Bliss Platt was born Ethel Appleby Bliss to Delos and Emily Bliss on October 25, 1881, and grew up in Englewood, New Jersey.

== Tennis career ==
Ethel Bliss had participated actively in the junior tennis tournaments around New Jersey as a youth. In 1894, The New York Times wrote about the Englewood tennis club which included Helen Homans and other standouts. In the article it highlighted that "there is a little girl of about thirteen who will surpass them all if her tennis ability is properly developed. The phenomenon is Miss Ethel Bliss whose backhand and forehand drives are worthy of a veteran."

The highlight of her playing career was the championship in the 1906 U.S. National Championships in doubles with Ann Burdette Coe, 6–4, 6–4 over Helen Homans and Clover Boldt.

=== Doubles titles (1) ===
Result	Year	Championship	Surface	Partner	Opponents	Score
Win	1906	U.S. National Championships	Grass	(United States) Ann Burdette Coe	(United States) Helen Homans (United States) Clover Boldt	6–4, 6–4

== Marriage and art collection ==
In 1900, she married Dan Fellows Platt, a Princeton University graduate who dedicated his life to the study of Renaissance art. They lived in Englewood for the rest of their lives but made regular trips to Europe for art collection and travel. Dan and Ethel built an Italian Palazzo house named Ambercroft. Dan Platt built one of the largest art collections in the United States with 400,000 photographs of art relics, 1,600 drawings spanning the 1500s until the 1900s, and many key pieces from the renaissance period, mostly from Siena.

Ethel inherited the significant collection. She sold some prominent works and gave much of the rest to Princeton University. One notable piece was a Giovanni di Paolo panel with Madonna surrounded by Saint Margaret the Virgin and Saint Catherine of Alexandria. She gave it as a loan to the Princeton University Art Museum. However, after finding the photograph collection of her husband in disrepair she demanded the di Paolo piece back and sold it. She sold some of the collection but upon her death in 1971, the remainder was provided to Princeton University as per Dan Fallows Platt's will.

Because of this art collecting, she was connected with many prominent intellectuals in New Jersey and Europe including friendships with Hannah Arendt and George Santayana amongst others.

In fall of 1970, she reportedly saw a firefly in the meadow behind her house and, because it was not the season for fireflies, went outside to investigate. Upon leaving her house she had a mild stroke and died in June the next year.

Ethel Bliss Platt is one of the six people highlighted in James Lord's 1998 book A Gift for Admiration: Further Memories. Lord, who knew Ethel for much of his life, wrote "It was not necessary in her company to become acquainted with painters or men of letters, because she herself so admirably embodied what was most precious in the works and pleasures of the men and women who sustained our companionship. They were the rare, great spirits of Western culture, and she was very like many of them."
