= Ann Burdette Coe =

American tennis player

- Country (sports): United States
- Born: May 1874; New Jersey, U.S.
- Died: January 11, 1947 (aged 72); Englewood, New Jersey, U.S.

Doubles

Grand Slam doubles results
- US Open: 1st (1906)

Ann Burdette Coe (May 1874 in New Jersey — January 11, 1947 in Englewood, New Jersey) was an American tennis player of the start of the 20th century.

== Career ==
Coe won the 1906 US Women's National Championship title in women's doubles with Ethel Bliss-Platt defeating Helen Homans and Clover Boldt in straight sets.

== Grand Slam finals ==
=== Doubles (1 title) ===
Result	Year	Championship	Surface	Partner	Opponents	Score
Win	1906	U.S. National Championships	Grass	(United States) Ethel Bliss Platt	(United States) Helen Homans (United States) Clover Boldt	6–4, 6–4
