= Tennis performance timeline comparison (women) (1884–1977) =

This article presents in a tabular form the career tennis Grand Slam, World Hard Court Championships and Olympic singles results of every woman who has reached the singles final of at least one Grand Slam, World Hard Court Championships or Olympic tournament (OLY) during her career. The Grand Slam tournaments are the Australian Open (AUS), the French Open (FRA), Wimbledon (WIM), and the US Open (USA).

This article is a compilation of the performance timelines that are included in the numerous Wikipedia articles covering individual tennis players, such as Helen Wills Moody, Billie Jean King, Margaret Court, Chris Evert and Martina Navratilova. This article facilitates the comparison of the career Grand Slam, World Hard Court Championships and Olympic singles results of each player, particularly of women who were playing at the same time.

This article is split into two sections, 1884–1977 and 1978–present, for ease of navigation.

== Key to table entries ==
Key
W	F	SF	QF	#R	RR	Q#	P#	DNQ	A	Z#	PO	G	S	B	NMS	NTI	P	NH

(W) winner; (F) finalist; (SF) semifinalist; (QF) quarterfinalist; (#R) rounds 4, 3, 2, 1; (RR) round-robin stage; (Q#) qualification round; (P#) preliminary round; (DNQ) did not qualify; (A) absent; (Z#) Davis/Fed Cup Zonal Group (with number indication) or (PO) play-off; (G) gold, (S) silver or (B) bronze Olympic/Paralympic medal; (NMS) not a Masters tournament; (NTI) not a Tier I tournament; (P) postponed; (NH) not held; (SR) strike rate (events won / competed); (W–L) win–loss record.
To avoid confusion and double counting, these charts are updated at the conclusion of a tournament or when the player's participation has ended.

The loser in the bronze medal match receives the normal semifinal entry shown above. The rest of the Olympic entries follow the standard key based on their progression through the tournament.

Refer to the notes below each table for an explanation of more tabular entries that are used infrequently in these tables.

== 1884–1900 ==
Player	1884	1885	1886	1887		1888		1889		1890		1891		1892		1893		1894		1895		1896		1897		1898		1899		1900		
Player	WIM	WIM	WIM	WIM	USA	WIM	USA	WIM	USA	WIM	USA	WIM	USA	WIM	USA	WIM	USA	WIM	USA	WIM	USA	WIM	USA	WIM	USA	WIM	USA	WIM	USA	WIM	USA	OLY
(United Kingdom of Great Britain and Ireland) Maud Watson	W	W	F	A	A	A	A	A	A	A	A	A	A	A	A	A	A	A	A	A	A	A	A	A	A	A	A	A	A	A	A	A
(United Kingdom of Great Britain and Ireland) Lillian Watson	F	1R	QF	A	A	A	A	A	A	A	A	A	A	A	A	A	A	A	A	A	A	A	A	A	A	A	A	A	A	A	A	A
(United Kingdom of Great Britain and Ireland) Blanche Bingley Hillyard	SF	F	W	F	A	F	A	W	A	SF	A	F	A	F	A	F	A	W	A	A	A	A	A	W	A	A	A	W	A	W	A	A
(United Kingdom of Great Britain and Ireland) Lottie Dod	A	A	A	W	A	W	A	A	A	A	A	W	A	W	A	W	A	A	A	A	A	A	A	A	A	A	A	A	A	A	A	A
(United States) Ellen Hansell	A	A	A	A	W	A	F	A	A	A	A	A	A	A	A	A	A	A	A	A	A	A	A	A	A	A	A	A	A	A	A	A
(United States) Laura Knight	A	A	A	A	F	A	A	A	QF	A	A	A	A	A	A	A	A	A	A	A	A	A	A	A	A	A	A	A	A	A	A	A
(United States) Bertha Townsend	A	A	A	A	A	A	W	A	W	A	F	A	A	A	A	A	A	A	SF	A	QF	A	A	A	A	A	A	A	A	A	A	A
(United Kingdom of Great Britain and Ireland) Helena Rice	A	A	A	A	A	A	A	F	A	W	A	A	A	A	A	A	A	A	A	A	A	A	A	A	A	A	A	A	A	A	A	A
(United States) Lida Voorhees	A	A	A	A	A	A	A	A	F	A	SF	A	QF	A	A	A	A	A	A	A	A	A	A	A	A	A	A	A	A	A	A	A
(United Kingdom of Great Britain and Ireland) May Jacks	A	A	A	A	A	A	A	SF	A	F	A	QF	A	A	A	A	A	A	A	A	A	A	A	A	A	A	A	A	A	A	A	A
(United States) Ellen Roosevelt	A	A	A	A	A	A	QF	A	QF	A	W	A	F	A	A	A	A	A	A	A	A	A	A	A	A	A	A	A	A	A	A	A
(United States) Mabel Cahill	A	A	A	A	A	A	A	A	A	A	QF	A	W	A	W	A	A	A	A	A	A	A	A	A	A	A	A	A	A	A	A	A
(United States) Elisabeth Moore	A	A	A	A	A	A	A	A	A	A	A	A	A	A	F	A	QF	A	A	A	SF	A	W	A	F	A	A	A	A	A	A	A
(United States) Aline Terry	A	A	A	A	A	A	A	A	A	A	A	A	A	A	A	A	W	A	F	A	A	A	A	A	A	A	A	A	A	A	A	A
(United States) Augusta Schultz	A	A	A	A	A	A	A	A	A	A	A	A	A	A	QF	A	F	A	A	A	A	A	A	A	A	A	A	A	A	A	A	A
(United Kingdom of Great Britain and Ireland) Edith Austin	A	A	A	A	A	A	A	A	A	A	A	A	A	A	A	SF	A	F	A	A	A	SF	A	QF	A	SF	A	QF	A	QF	A	A
(United States) Helen Hellwig	A	A	A	A	A	A	A	A	A	A	A	A	A	A	A	A	QF	A	W	A	F	A	A	A	A	A	A	A	A	A	A	A
(United Kingdom of Great Britain and Ireland) Charlotte Cooper Sterry	A	A	A	A	A	A	A	A	A	A	A	A	A	A	A	QF	A	QF	A	W	A	W	A	F	A	W	A	F	A	F	A	G
(United Kingdom of Great Britain and Ireland) Helen Jackson	A	A	A	A	A	A	A	A	A	A	A	QF	A	QF	A	A	A	A	A	F	A	A	A	A	A	A	A	A	A	A	A	A
(United States) Juliette Atkinson	A	A	A	A	A	A	A	A	A	A	A	A	A	A	A	A	A	A	QF	A	W	A	F	A	W	A	W	A	A	A	A	A
(United Kingdom of Great Britain and Ireland) Alice Simpson-Pickering	A	A	A	A	A	A	A	A	A	A	A	A	A	A	A	A	A	A	A	SF	A	F	A	SF	A	1R	A	1R	A	1R	A	A
(United Kingdom of Great Britain and Ireland) Louisa Martin	A	A	A	A	A	A	A	A	A	A	A	A	A	QF	A	A	A	A	A	A	A	A	A	A	A	F	A	A	A	SF	A	A
(United States) Marion Jones	A	A	A	A	A	A	A	A	A	A	A	A	A	A	A	A	A	A	A	A	A	A	A	A	A	A	F	A	W	A	A	A
(United States) Maud Banks	A	A	A	A	A	A	A	A	A	A	A	A	A	A	A	A	A	A	A	A	A	A	A	A	QF	A	QF	A	F	A	QF	A
(United States) Myrtle McAteer	A	A	A	A	A	A	A	A	A	A	A	A	A	A	A	A	A	A	A	A	A	A	A	A	A	A	A	A	QF	A	W	A
(United States) Edith Parker	A	A	A	A	A	A	A	A	A	A	A	A	A	A	A	A	A	A	A	A	A	A	A	A	A	A	A	A	QF	A	F	A
(France) Helene Prevost	A	A	A	A	A	A	A	A	A	A	A	A	A	A	A	A	A	A	A	A	A	A	A	A	A	A	A	A	A	QF	A	S
(United Kingdom of Great Britain and Ireland) Muriel Robb	A	A	A	A	A	A	A	A	A	A	A	A	A	A	A	A	A	A	A	A	A	A	A	A	A	A	A	QF	A	QF	A	A
(United Kingdom of Great Britain and Ireland) Dorothea Douglass Lambert Chambers	A	A	A	A	A	A	A	A	A	A	A	A	A	A	A	A	A	A	A	A	A	A	A	A	A	A	A	A	A	QF	A	A

== 1901–1912 ==
Player	1901		1902		1903		1904		1905		1906		1907		1908			1909		1910		1911		1912			
Player	WIM	USA	WIM	USA	WIM	USA	WIM	USA	WIM	USA	WIM	USA	WIM	USA	WIM	USA	OLY	WIM	USA	WIM	USA	WIM	USA	WHC	WIM	USA	OLY
(United Kingdom of Great Britain and Ireland) Blanche Bingley Hillyard	F	A	2R	A	A	A	3R	A	SF	A	QF	A	SF	A	2R	A	A	2R	A	3R	A	A	A		SF	A	A
(United Kingdom of Great Britain and Ireland) Charlotte Cooper Sterry	W	A	F	A	A	A	F	A	A	A	ACF	A	A	A	W	A	A	A	A	2R	A	2R	A		F	A	A
(United States) Myrtle McAteer	A	F	A		A		A		A		A		A		A		A	A		A		A			A		A
(United States) Elisabeth Moore	A	W	A	F	A	W	A	F	A	W	A	F	A		A		A	A		A		A			A		A
(United Kingdom of Great Britain and Ireland) Muriel Robb	QF	A	W	A	-	-	-	-	-	-	-	-	-	-	-	-	-	-	-	-	-	-	-	-	-	-	-
(United States) Marion Jones	A	ACF	A	W	A	F	A	A	A	A	A	A	A	A	A	A	A	A	A	A	A	A	A		A	A	A
(United Kingdom of Great Britain and Ireland) Dorothea Douglass Lambert Chambers	2R	A	SF	A	W	A	W	A	F	A	W	A	F	A	QF	A	G	A	A	W	A	W	A		A	A	A
(United Kingdom of Great Britain and Ireland) Ethel Thomson Larcombe	A	A	1R	A	F	A	3R	A	QF	A	2R	A	A	A	A	A	A	A	A	A	A	A	A		W	A	A
(United States) May Sutton Bundy	A	A	A	A	A	A	A	W	W	A	F	A	W	A	A	A	A	A	A	A	A	A	A		A	A	A
(United States) Helen Homans McLean	A		A		A		A	F	A	F	A	W	A		A		A	A		A		A			A		A
(United States) Evelyn Sears	A		A		A		A		A		A		A	W	A	F	A	A		A		A			A		A
(United States) Carrie Neely	A		A		A		A		A		A		A	F	A		A	A		A		A			A		A
(United Kingdom of Great Britain and Ireland) Agnes Morton	SF		ACF		QF		ACF		SF		3R		3R		F		4R	F		A		3R			QF		A
(United States) Maud Barger Wallach	A		A		A		A		A		A	ACF	A		A	W	A	A	F	A		A			A		A
(United Kingdom of Great Britain and Ireland) Penelope Dora Harvey Boothby	A	A	A	A	A	A	2R	A	QF	A	1R	A	1R	A	SF	A	S	W	A	F	A	F	A		3R	A	A
(United States) Hazel Hotchkiss Wightman	-	-	-	-	-	-	-	-	-	-	-	-	-	-	-	-	-	A	W	A	W	A	W	A	A	A	A
(United States) Louise Hammond Raymond	A		A		A		A		A		A		A		A		A	A		A	F	A			A		A
(United States) Florence Sutton	A	A	A	A	A	A	A	A	A	A	A	A	A	A	A	A	A	A	A	A	A	A	F		A	A	A
(France) Marguerite Broquedis	A		A		A		A		A		A		A		A		A	A		A		A		W	A		G
(Germany) Mieken Rieck	A		A		A		A		A		A		A		A		A	A		A		2R		F	A		1R
(United States) Mary Browne	A		A		A		A		A		A		A		A		A	A		A		A			A	W	A
(United States) Eleonora Sears	A		A		A		A		A		A		A		A		A	A		A		A			A	F	A
(Germany) Dora Köring	A		A		A		A		A		A		A		A		A	A		A		A			A		S
(United States) Elizabeth Ryan	A		A		A		A		A		A		A		A		A	A		A		A			QF		A
(Norway) Molla Bjurstedt	A		A		A		A		A		A		A		A		A	2R	A	A	A	A	A		A	A	B

Notes:

- ACF = lost in the all comers final (the winner played the defending champion).
- Through 1923, the French Championships were open only to French nationals. The World Hard Court Championships, actually played on clay in Paris or Brussels, began in 1912 and were open to all nationalities. Though not a slam, many major players participated and the results from that tournament are shown here for 1912.
- The results from the outdoor version of the tennis competition at the 1908 and 1912 Olympic Games are shown here.

== 1913–1921 ==
Player	1913			1914			1915			1916			1917			1918			1919			1920				1921		
Player	WHC	WIM	USA	WHC	WIM	USA	WHC	WIM	USA	WHC	WIM	USA	WHC	WIM	USA	WHC	WIM	USA	WHC	WIM	USA	WHC	WIM	OLY	USA	WHC	WIM	USA
(United Kingdom of Great Britain and Ireland) Blanche Bingley Hillyard	A	2R	A	A	A	A	NH	NH	A	NH	NH	A	NH	NH	A	NH	NH	A	NH	A	A	A	A	A	A	A	A	A
(United Kingdom of Great Britain and Ireland) Charlotte Cooper Sterry	A	QF	A	A	3R	A	NH	NH	A	NH	NH	A	NH	NH	A	NH	NH	A	NH	3R	A	A	A	A	A	-	-	-
(United Kingdom) Dorothea Douglass Lambert Chambers	A	W	A	A	W	A	NH	NH	A	NH	NH	A	NH	NH	A	NH	NH	A	NH	F	A	A	F	A	A	A	A	A
(United Kingdom) Ethel Thomson Larcombe	A	A	A	A	F	A	NH	NH	A	NH	NH	A	NH	NH	A	NH	NH	A	NH	2R	A	A	A	A	A	A	A	A
(United States) May Sutton Bundy	A	A	A	A	A	A	NH	NH	A	NH	NH	A	NH	NH	A	NH	NH	A	NH	A	A	A	A	A	A	A	A	SF
(United States) Evelyn Sears	A	A	A	A	A	A	NH	NH	QF	NH	NH	SF	NH	NH	-	NH	NH	-	NH	-	-	-	-	-	-	-	-	-
(United States) Carrie Neely	A	A	A	A	A	QF	NH	NH	A	NH	NH	A	NH	NH	2R	NH	NH	A	NH	A	A	-	-	-	-	-	-	-
(United Kingdom of Great Britain and Ireland) Agnes Morton	A	3R	A	A	3R	A	NH	NH	A	NH	NH	A	NH	NH	A	NH	NH	A	NH	A	A	-	-	-	-	-	-	-
(United States) Maud Barger Wallach	A	A	A	A	A	A	NH	NH	3R	NH	NH	QF	NH	NH	A	NH	NH	A	NH	A	A	A	A	A	2R	-	-	-
(United Kingdom of Great Britain and Ireland) Penelope Dora Harvey Boothby	A	2R	A	A	A	A	NH	NH	A	NH	NH	A	NH	NH	A	NH	NH	A	NH	A	A	A	2R	A	A	A	3R	A
(United States) Hazel Hotchkiss Wightman	A	A	A	A	A	A	NH	NH	F	NH	NH	A	NH	NH	A	NH	NH	A	NH	A	W	A	A	A	A	A	A	A
(United States) Louise Hammond Raymond	A	A	A	A	A	SF	NH	NH	A	NH	NH	F	NH	NH	A	NH	NH	A	NH	A	A	A	A	A	A	A	A	3R
(France) Marguerite Broquedis	F	A	A	SF	1R	A	NH	NH	A	NH	NH	A	NH	NH	A	NH	NH	A	NH	A	A	QF	A	A	A	SF	A	A
(Germany) Mieken Rieck	W	3R	A	A	A	A	NH	NH	A	NH	NH	A	NH	NH	A	NH	NH	A	NH	A	A	-	-	-	-	-	-	-
(United States) Mary Browne	A	A	W	A	A	W	NH	NH	A	NH	NH	A	NH	NH	A	NH	NH	A	NH	A	A	A	A	A	A	A	A	F
(United Kingdom) Winifred McNair	A	ACF	A	A	2R	A	NH	NH	A	NH	NH	A	NH	NH	A	NH	NH	A	NH	3R	A	A	QF	2R	A	A	A	A
(United States) Dorothy Green	A	A	F	A	A	A	NH	NH	1R	NH	NH	A	NH	NH	A	NH	NH	A	NH	A	A	A	A	A	4R	-	-	-
(France) Suzanne Lenglen	A	A	A	W	A	A	NH	NH	A	NH	NH	A	NH	NH	A	NH	NH	A	NH	W	A	1R	W	G	A	W	W	2R
(France) Germaine Golding	QF	A	A	F	A	A	NH	NH	A	NH	NH	A	NH	NH	A	NH	NH	A	NH	A	A	1R	A	A	A	QF	A	A
(United States) Elizabeth Ryan	QF	1R	A	QF	ACF	A	NH	NH	A	NH	NH	A	NH	NH	A	NH	NH	A	NH	SF	A	A	ACF	A	A	A	F	A
(United States) Marie Wagner	A	A	A	A	A	F	NH	NH	A	NH	NH	A	NH	NH	A	NH	NH	A	NH	A	QF	A	A	A	A	A	A	1R
(Norway) / (United States) Molla Bjurstedt	A	A	A	A	A	A	NH	NH	W	NH	NH	W	NH	NH	W	NH	NH	W	NH	A	SF	A	SF	A	W	F	QF	W
(United States) Marion Vanderhoef Morse	-	-	-	-	-	-	NH	NH	QF	NH	NH	A	NH	NH	F	NH	NH	A	NH	A	A	-	-	-	-	-	-	-
(United States) Eleanor Goss	-	-	-	-	-	-	NH	NH	-	NH	NH	-	NH	NH	A	NH	NH	F	NH	A	3R	A	A	A	SF	A	A	1R
(United Kingdom) Phyllis Satterthwaite	A	QF	A	2R	1R	A	NH	NH	A	NH	NH	A	NH	NH	A	NH	NH	A	NH	ACF	A	SF	QF	A	A	A	ACF	A
(United States) Marion Zinderstein Jessup	-	-	-	-	-	-	NH	NH	A	NH	NH	A	NH	NH	3R	NH	NH	3R	NH	A	F	A	A	A	F	A	A	1R
(United Kingdom) Dorothy Holman	A	SF	A	A	3R	A	NH	NH	A	NH	NH	A	NH	NH	A	NH	NH	A	NH	3R	A	W	A	S	A	2R	2R	A
(Spain) Francisca Subirana	-	-	-	A	A	A	NH	NH	A	NH	NH	A	NH	NH	A	NH	NH	A	NH	A	A	F	A	1R	A	A	A	A
(United Kingdom) Kitty McKane Godfree	-	-	-	-	-	-	NH	NH	A	NH	NH	A	NH	NH	A	NH	NH	A	NH	QF	A	A	3R	B	A	A	2R	A
(Australia) Sylvia Lance Harper	-	-	-	-	-	-	NH	NH	-	NH	NH	-	NH	NH	-	NH	NH	-	NH	-	-	A	2R	A	A	A	A	A
(South Africa) Irene Bowder Peacock	-	-	-	A	A	A	NH	NH	A	NH	NH	A	NH	NH	A	NH	NH	A	NH	A	A	A	A	A	A	SF	SF	A

== 1922–1928 ==
Player	1922				1923				1924					1925				1926				1927				1928			
Player	AUS	WHC	WIM	USA	AUS	WHC	WIM	USA	AUS	WHC	WIM	OLY	USA	AUS	FRA	WIM	USA	AUS	FRA	WIM	USA	AUS	FRA	WIM	USA	AUS	FRA	WIM	USA
(United States) May Sutton Bundy	A	A	A	SF	A	A	A	A	A	NH	A	A	A	A	A	A	3R	A	A	A	A	A	A	A	A	A	A	A	3R
(United States) Hazel Hotchkiss Wightman	A	A	A	A	A	A	A	A	A	NH	3R	A	A	A	A	A	A	A	A	A	3R	A	A	A	1R	A	A	A	QF
(United States) Mary Browne	A	A	A	A	A	A	A	A	A	NH	A	A	SF	A	A	A	3R	A	F	1R	SF	-	-	-	-	-	-	-	-
(France) Suzanne Lenglen	A	W	W	A	A	W	W	A	A	NH	SF	2R	A	A	W	W	A	A	W	3R	A	-	-	-	-	-	-	-	-
(United States) Elizabeth Ryan	A	F	QF	A	A	A	SF	A	A	NH	QF	A	A	A	A	2R	QF	A	QF	3R	F	A	A	SF	A	A	A	SF	A
(United States) Molla Bjursted Mallory	A	A	F	W	A	A	QF	F	A	NH	2R	QF	F	A	A	A	SF	A	A	SF	W	A	A	3R	QF	A	2R	1R	SF
(United States) Marion Zinderstein Jessup	A	A	A	QF	A	A	A	A	A	NH	QF	QF	QF	A	A	A	3R	A	2R	2R	A	A	A	A	A	A	A	A	A
(United States) Helen Wills Moody	A	A	A	F	A	A	A	W	A	NH	F	G	W	A	A	A	W	A	2R	1R	A	A	A	W	W	A	W	W	W
(United Kingdom) Kitty McKane Godfree	A	SF	2R	A	A	F	F	QF	A	NH	W	B	A	A	F	SF	F	A	A	W	A	A	A	QF	1R	A	A	A	A
(France) Julie "Didi" Vlasto Serpieri	-	-	-	-	A	QF	4R	A	A	NH	A	S	A	A	SF	A	A	A	2R	SF	A	A	A	A	A	A	A	A	A
(United Kingdom) Joan Fry Lakeman	-	-	-	-	-	_	-	-	-	-	-	-	-	A	A	F	QF	A	SF	3R	A	A	A	SF	3R	A	3R	2R	A
(Spain) Lili de Alvarez Valdene	-	-	-	-	-	-	-	-	A	NH	A	QF	A	A	1R	A	A	A	A	F	A	A	QF	F	A	A	A	F	A
(Netherlands) Kea Bouman	-	-	-	-	A	A	2R	A	A	NH	1R	3R	A	A	A	2R	A	A	SF	QF	A	A	W	4R	QF	A	SF	3R	A
(South Africa) Irene Bowder Peacock	A	2R	SF	A	A	A	A	A	A	NH	A	A	A	A	A	A	A	A	A	A	A	A	F	QF	A	A	A	A	A
(United Kingdom) Betty Nuthall Shoemaker	-	-	-	-	-	-	-	-	-	-	-	-	-	-	-	-	-	A	A	2R	A	A	A	QF	F	A	2R	1R	A
(United Kingdom) Eileen Bennett Whittingstall	-	-	-	-	-	-	-	-	-	-	-	-	-	A	A	1R	A	A	A	2R	A	A	SF	3R	3R	A	F	QF	A
(United States) Helen Hull Jacobs	-	-	-	-	-	-	-	-	-	-	-	-	-	A	A	A	2R	A	A	A	A	A	A	A	SF	A	A	3R	F
(France) Simonne Mathieu	-	-	-	-	-	-	-	-	-	-	-	-	-	A	QF	A	A	A	QF	1R	A	A	3R	2R	A	A	A	A	A
(United Kingdom) Phoebe Holcroft Watson	-	-	-	-	A	A	1R	A	A	NH	3R	A	A	A	A	1R	A	A	A	3R	A	A	3R	QF	A	A	2R	QF	A
(United States) Anna McCune Harper	-	-	-	-	-	-	-	-	-	-	-	-	-	A	A	3R	A	A	A	1R	A	A	A	A	A	A	A	A	3R
(Germany) Cilly Aussem	-	-	-	-	-	-	-	-	-	-	-	-	-	-	-	-	-	-	-	-	-	A	QF	2R	A	A	3R	QF	A
(United Kingdom) Dorothy Round Little	-	-	-	-	-	-	-	-	-	-	-	-	-	-	-	-	-	-	-	-	-	-	-	-	-	A	A	1R	A
(United States) Sarah Palfrey Cooke	-	-	-	-	-	-	-	-	-	-	-	-	-	-	-	-	-	-	-	-	-	-	-	-	-	A	A	A	1R
(Australia) Margaret "Mal" Molesworth	W	A	A	A	W	A	A	A	QF	NH	A	A	A	A	A	A	A	A	A	A	A	A	A	A	A	QF	A	A	A
(Australia) Esna Boyd Robertson	F	A	A	A	F	A	A	A	F	NH	A	A	A	F	A	QF	A	F	A	A	A	W	A	A	A	F	3R	4R	A
(Australia) Sylvia Lance Harper	SF	A	A	A	SF	A	A	A	W	NH	A	A	A	SF	A	A	A	SF	A	A	A	F	A	A	A	2R	A	A	A
(Australia) Daphne Akhurst Cozens	-	-	-	-	-	-	-	-	SF	NH	A	A	A	W	A	QF	A	W	A	A	A	2R	A	A	A	W	QF	SF	A
(Australia) Louise Bickerton	-	-	-	-	-	-	-	-	-	-	-	-	-	2R	A	A	A	A	A	A	A	SF	A	A	A	SF	3R	4R	A
(Australia) Coral Buttsworth	-	-	-	-	-	-	-	-	-	-	-	-	-	1R	A	A	A	A	A	A	A	A	A	A	A	2R	A	A	A
(Australia) Marjorie Cox Crawford	-	-	-	-	-	-	-	-	-	-	-	-	-	QF	A	A	A	SF	A	A	A	QF	A	A	A	2R	A	A	A

Notes:

- Through 1923, the French Championships were open only to French nationals. The World Hard Court Championships (WHCC), actually played on clay in Paris or Brussels, began in 1912 and were open to all nationalities. The results from that tournament are shown here for 1922 and 1923. The Olympics replaced the WHCC in 1924, as the Olympics were held in Paris. Beginning in 1925, the French Championships were open to all nationalities, with the results shown here beginning with that year.

== 1929–1935 ==
Player	1929				1930				1931				1932				1933				1934				1935			
Player	AUS	FRA	WIM	USA	AUS	FRA	WIM	USA	AUS	FRA	WIM	USA	AUS	FRA	WIM	USA	AUS	FRA	WIM	USA	AUS	FRA	WIM	USA	AUS	FRA	WIM	USA
(United States) May Sutton Bundy	A	2R	QF	3R	-	-	-	-	-	-	-	-	-	-	-	-	-	-	-	-	-	-	-	-	-	-	-	-
(United States) Elizabeth Ryan	A	A	3R	A	A	QF	F	A	A	QF	A	A	A	1R	1R	A	A	1R	A	A	A	1R	A	QF	-	-	-	-
(United States) Molla Bjursted Mallory	A	A	3R	SF	-	-	-	-	-	-	-	-	-	-	-	-	-	-	-	-	-	-	-	-	-	-	-	-
(United States) Helen Wills Moody	A	W	W	W	A	W	W	A	A	A	A	W	A	W	W	A	A	A	W	F	A	A	A	A	A	A	W	A
(United Kingdom) Kitty McKane Godfree	A	A	A	A	A	A	A	A	A	A	4R	A	A	A	4R	A	A	A	2R	A	A	A	3R	A	-	-	-	-
(France) Julie "Didi" Vlasto Serpieri	A	A	2R	A	A	A	1R	A	A	1R	A	A	-	-	-	-	-	-	-	-	-	-	-	-	-	-	-	-
(United Kingdom) Joan Fry Lakeman	A	A	4R	A	A	A	3R	A	-	-	-	-	-	-	-	-	-	-	-	-	-	-	-	-	-	-	-	-
(Spain) Lilí de Álvarez Valdene	A	A	4R	A	A	SF	1R	A	A	SF	3R	A	A	3R	A	A	A	A	A	A	A	A	A	A	A	1R	2R	A
(Netherlands) Kea Bouman	A	1R	3R	A	-	-	-	-	-	-	-	-	-	-	-	-	-	-	-	-	-	-	-	-	-	-	-	-
(South Africa) Irene Bowder Peacock	A	A	A	A	A	A	A	A	A	A	A	A	A	A	2R	A	-	-	-	-	-	-	-	-	-	-	-	-
(United Kingdom) Betty Nuthall Shoemaker	A	A	3R	QF	A	A	QF	W	A	F	QF	SF	A	SF	QF	A	A	SF	4R	SF	A	3R	1R	2R	A	A	A	A
(United Kingdom) Eileen Bennett Whittingstall	A	SF	4R	A	A	2R	2R	A	A	2R	4R	F	A	QF	QF	A	A	QF	4R	A	A	A	2R	A	A	A	4R	A
(United States) Helen Hull Jacobs	A	A	F	SF	A	F	QF	A	A	QF	SF	QF	A	QF	F	W	A	SF	SF	W	A	F	F	W	A	SF	F	W
(France) Simonne Mathieu	A	F	3R	A	A	QF	SF	A	A	QF	SF	A	A	F	SF	A	A	F	QF	A	A	SF	SF	A	A	F	QF	A
(United Kingdom) Phoebe Holcroft Watson	A	QF	3R	F	A	QF	1R	A	-	-	-	-	-	-	-	-	-	-	-	-	-	-	-	-	-	-	-	-
(United States) Anna McCune Harper	A	A	A	3R	A	A	A	F	A	A	4R	QF	A	A	1R	QF	-	-	-	-	-	-	-	-	-	-	-	-
(Germany) Cilly Aussem	A	SF	4R	A	A	SF	SF	A	A	W	W	A	A	QF	1R	A	A	2R	A	A	A	SF	QF	A	-	-	-	-
(Germany) Hilde Krahwinkel Sperling	A	2R	A	A	A	3R	2R	A	A	SF	F	A	A	SF	QF	A	A	2R	SF	A	A	A	4R	A	A	W	SF	A
(United States) Carolin Babcock Stark	A	A	A	1R	A	A	A	2R	A	A	A	A	A	A	A	F	A	A	A	3R	A	2R	4R	SF	A	A	A	QF
(United Kingdom) Margaret "Peggy" Scriven-Vivian	-	-	-	-	A	A	1R	A	A	A	QF	A	A	2R	2R	A	A	W	QF	3R	A	W	QF	A	A	SF	3R	A
(United Kingdom) Dorothy Round Little	A	A	2R	A	A	A	3R	A	A	A	QF	3R	A	A	QF	A	A	A	F	SF	A	A	W	A	W	A	QF	A
(United States) Sarah Palfrey Cooke	A	A	A	3R	A	A	2R	3R	A	A	A	3R	A	A	4R	2R	A	A	A	QF	A	3R	QF	F	A	A	A	F
(United Kingdom) Nancy Lyle Glover	A	A	2R	A	A	A	2R	A	A	A	2R	A	A	A	1R	A	A	A	3R	A	A	QF	1R	A	F	A	3R	A
(United States) Alice Marble	-	-	-	-	-	-	-	-	A	A	A	1R	A	A	A	3R	A	A	A	QF	A	2R	A	A	A	A	A	A
(Poland) Jadwiga Jędrzejowska	-	-	-	-	-	-	-	-	A	2R	1R	A	A	A	3R	A	A	1R	3R	A	A	3R	4R	A	A	A	QF	A
(United Kingdom) Kay Stammers Bullitt	-	-	-	-	-	-	-	-	A	A	2R	A	A	A	4R	A	A	3R	4R	A	A	QF	3R	QF	A	1R	QF	SF
(Australia) Margaret "Mal" Molesworth	QF	A	A	A	QF	A	A	A	1R	A	A	A	A	A	A	A	QF	A	A	A	F	3R	1R	A	2R	A	A	A
(Australia) Esna Boyd Robertson	A	A	A	A	A	A	4R	A	A	A	A	A	2R	A	A	A	A	A	A	A	A	A	1R	A	-	-	-	-
(Australia) Sylvia Lance Harper	SF	A	A	A	F	A	A	A	SF	A	A	A	-	-	-	-	-	-	-	-	-	-	-	-	-	-	-	-
(Australia) Daphne Akhurst Cozens	W	A	A	A	W	A	A	A	-	-	-	-	-	-	-	-	-	-	-	-	-	-	-	-	-	-	-	-
(Australia) Louise Bickerton	F	A	A	A	SF	A	A	A	QF	A	A	A	A	A	A	A	A	A	A	A	SF	A	A	A	QF	A	A	A
(Australia) Coral Buttsworth	A	A	A	A	A	A	A	A	W	A	A	A	W	A	A	A	F	A	A	A	-	-	-	-	-	-	-	-
(Australia) Marjorie Cox Crawford	SF	A	A	A	QF	A	A	A	F	A	A	A	QF	A	1R	A	2R	2R	A	A	-	-	-	-	-	-	-	-
(Australia) Kathleen Le Messurier	-	-	-	-	-	-	-	-	-	-	-	-	F	A	A	A	A	A	A	A	SF	A	A	A	1R	A	A	A
(Australia) Joan Hartigan Bathurst	-	-	-	-	-	-	-	-	QF	A	A	A	A	A	A	A	W	A	A	A	W	3R	SF	A	A	A	SF	A
(Australia) Nancye Wynne Bolton	-	-	-	-	-	-	-	-	-	-	-	-	-	-	-	-	-	-	-	-	-	-	-	-	2R	A	A	A
(Australia) Nell Hall Hopman	-	-	-	-	1R	A	A	A	1R	A	A	A	A	A	A	A	QF	A	A	A	QF	1R	3R	A	SF	2R	2R	A

== 1936–1942 ==
Player	1936				1937				1938				1939				1940				1941				1942			
Player	AUS	FRA	WIM	USA	AUS	FRA	WIM	USA	AUS	FRA	WIM	USA	AUS	FRA	WIM	USA	AUS	FRA	WIM	USA	AUS	FRA	WIM	USA	AUS	FRA	WIM	USA
(United States) Alice Marble	A	A	A	W	A	A	SF	QF	A	A	SF	W	A	A	W	W	A	NH	NH	W	-	-	-	-	-	-	-	-
(United States) Helen Hull Jacobs	A	A	W	F	A	QF	QF	SF	A	A	F	3R	A	A	QF	F	A	NH	NH	F	NH	R	NH	SF	-	-	-	-
(Denmark) Hilde Krahwinkel Sperling	A	W	F	A	A	W	QF	A	A	A	SF	A	A	A	SF	A	-	-	-	-	-	-	-	-	-	-	-	-
(France) Simonne Mathieu	A	F	SF	A	A	F	SF	A	A	W	QF	QF	A	W	QF	1R	A	NH	NH	A	NH	R	NH	A	NH	R	NH	A
(Poland) Jadwiga Jędrzejowska	A	3R	SF	A	A	SF	F	F	A	A	QF	QF	A	F	QF	A	A	NH	NH	A	NH	R	NH	A	NH	R	NH	A
(United Kingdom) Kay Stammers Bullitt	A	A	QF	SF	A	A	4R	QF	A	A	QF	QF	A	A	F	SF	A	NH	NH	A	NH	R	NH	A	NH	R	NH	A
(United States) Sarah Palfrey Cooke	A	A	2R	1R	A	A	A	1R	A	A	QF	SF	A	QF	SF	QF	A	NH	NH	3R	NH	R	NH	W	NH	R	NH	A
(United States) Pauline Betz Addie	-	-	-	-	-	-	-	-	-	-	-	-	A	A	A	1R	A	NH	NH	QF	NH	R	NH	F	NH	R	NH	W
(Chile) Anita Lizana de Ellis	A	A	QF	A	A	A	QF	W	A	A	2R	A	A	2R	A	A	A	NH	NH	A	NH	R	NH	A	NH	R	NH	A
(United Kingdom) Dorothy Round Little	A	A	QF	A	A	A	W	A	A	A	A	A	A	A	4R	A	-	-	-	-	-	-	-	-	-	-	-	-
(Australia) Nancye Wynne Bolton	F	A	A	A	W	A	A	A	SF	3R	4R	F	2R	A	A	A	W	NH	NH	A	NH	R	NH	A	NH	R	NH	A
(United States) Helen Wills Moody	A	A	A	A	A	A	A	A	A	A	W	A	-	-	-	-	-	-	-	-	-	-	-	-	-	-	-	-
(Australia) Thelma Coyne Long	SF	A	A	A	SF	A	A	A	QF	2R	3R	3R	SF	A	A	A	F	NH	NH	A	NH	R	NH	A	NH	R	NH	A
(Spain) Lili de Alvarez Valdene	A	SF	4R	A	A	SF	4R	A	-	-	-	-	-	-	-	-	-	-	-	-	-	-	-	-	-	-	-	-
(United Kingdom) Margaret "Peggy" Scriven-Vivian	A	2R	1R	A	A	QF	QF	A	A	A	4R	A	A	A	4R	A	A	NH	NH	A	NH	R	NH	A	NH	R	NH	A
(United States) Margaret Osborne duPont	-	-	-	-	-	-	-	-	A	A	A	2R	A	A	A	A	A	NH	NH	3R	NH	R	NH	SF	NH	R	NH	SF
(France) Nelly Adamson Landry	A	A	QF	4R	A	A	A	A	A	F	A	A	A	A	A	A	A	A	NH	A	NH	R	NH	A	NH	R	NH	A
(United States) Louise Brough Clapp	-	-	-	-	-	-	-	-	-	-	-	-	A	A	A	1R	A	NH	NH	1R	NH	R	NH	2R	NH	R	NH	F
(United States) Doris Hart	-	-	-	-	-	-	-	-	-	-	-	-	-	-	-	-	A	NH	NH	2R	NH	R	NH	1R	NH	R	NH	QF
(United Kingdom) Betty Nuthall Shoemaker	A	A	2R	A	A	A	4R	A	A	A	4R	A	A	A	1R	3R	A	NH	NH	A	NH	R	NH	A	NH	R	NH	A
(United States) Patricia Canning Todd	-	-	-	-	-	-	-	-	A	A	A	1R	A	A	A	1R	A	NH	NH	3R	NH	R	NH	3R	NH	R	NH	2R
(United States) Shirley Fry Irvin	-	-	-	-	-	-	-	-	-	-	-	-	-	-	-	-	-	-	-	-	NH	R	NH	1R	NH	R	NH	QF
(Australia) Joan Hartigan Bathurst	W	A	A	A	QF	A	A	A	QF	A	2R	A	SF	A	A	A	SF	NH	NH	A	NH	R	NH	A	NH	R	NH	A
(Australia) Nell Hall Hopman	QF	A	A	A	2R	A	A	A	SF	3R	1R	3R	F	A	A	A	SF	NH	NH	A	NH	R	NH	A	NH	R	NH	A
(Australia) Dot Stevenson									F								A	NH	NH		NH	R	NH		NH	R	NH	
(United Kingdom) Eileen Bennett Whittingstall	A	A	A	A	A	A	A	A	A	A	2R	A	-	-	-	-	-	-	-	-	-	-	-	-	-	-	-	-
(United States) Carolin Babcock Stark	A	A	3R	QF	A	A	A	3R	-	-	-	-	-	-	-	-	-	-	-	-	-	-	-	-	-	-	-	-
(United States) Dorothy "Dodo" Bundy Cheney	A	A	A	QF	A	A	A	SF	W	A	4R	SF	A	A	A	QF	A	NH	NH	QF	NH	R	NH	QF	NH	R	NH	A
(Australia) Emily Hood Westacott	A	A	A	A	F	A	A	A	2R	A	A	A	W	A	A	A	A	NH	NH	A	NH	R	NH	A	NH	R	NH	A

Notes:

- R = tournament restricted to French nationals and held under German occupation

== 1943–1949 ==
Player	1943				1944				1945				1946				1947				1948				1949			
Player	AUS	FRA	WIM	USA	AUS	FRA	WIM	USA	AUS	FRA	WIM	USA	AUS	FRA	WIM	USA	AUS	FRA	WIM	USA	AUS	FRA	WIM	USA	AUS	FRA	WIM	USA
(United States) Margaret Osborne duPont	NH	R	NH	QF	NH	R	NH	F	NH	NH	A	QF	A	SF	W	QF	A	W	SF	F	A	A	SF	W	A	W	F	W
(United States) Pauline Betz Addie	NH	R	NH	W	NH	R	NH	W	NH	NH	A	F	A	W	F	W	-	-	-	-	-	-	-	-	-	-	-	-
(United States) Louise Brough Clapp	NH	R	NH	F	NH	R	NH	SF	NH	NH	A	SF	A	F	SF	QF	A	SF	SF	W	A	A	W	F	A	3R	W	SF
(United States) Doris Hart	NH	R	NH	SF	NH	R	NH	QF	NH	NH	A	SF	A	QF	QF	F	A	F	F	SF	A	SF	F	QF	W	A	A	F
(United States) Patricia Canning Todd	NH	R	NH	A	NH	R	NH	2R	NH	NH	A	QF	A	3R	3R	SF	A	QF	W	QF	A	SF	SF	SF	A	A	SF	QF
(Australia) Nancye Wynne Bolton	NH	R	NH	A	NH	R	NH	A	NH	NH	A	A	W	A	A	A	W	QF	A	SF	W	A	A	A	F	A	A	A
(France) Nelly Adamson Landry	NH	R	NH	A	NH	R	NH	A	NH	NH	A	A	A	A	QF	A	A	A	A	A	A	W	QF	3R	A	F	3R	A
(United States) Sarah Palfrey Cooke	NH	R	NH	QF	NH	R	NH	A	NH	NH	A	W	-	-	-	-	-	-	-	-	-	-	-	-	-	-	-	-
(United States) Shirley Fry Irvin	NH	R	NH	1R	NH	R	NH	QF	NH	NH	A	1R	A	A	A	1R	A	A	A	3R	A	F	QF	3R	A	A	4R	3R
(United States) Dorothy Head Knode	NH	R	NH	QF	NH	R	NH	2R	NH	NH	A	1R	A	A	A	QF	A	A	A	QF	A	A	A	3R	A	A	A	2R
(Australia) Thelma Coyne Long	NH	R	NH	A	NH	R	NH	A	NH	NH	A	A	QF	A	A	A	SF	A	A	A	2R	A	A	A	SF	A	4R	A
(United Kingdom) Kay Stammers Bullitt	NH	R	NH	A	NH	R	NH	A	NH	NH	A	A	A	QF	A	3R	A	QF	A	A	-	-	-	-	-	-	-	-
(United Kingdom) Margaret "Peggy" Scriven-Vivian	NH	R	NH	A	NH	R	NH	A	NH	NH	A	A	A	4R	A	A	A	3R	A	A	-	-	-	-	-	-	-	-
(United Kingdom) Betty Nuthall Shoemaker	NH	R	NH	A	NH	R	NH	A	NH	NH	A	A	A	4R	A	A	-	-	-	-	-	-	-	-	-	-	-	-
(Chile) Anita Lizana de Ellis	NH	R	NH	A	NH	R	NH	A	NH	NH	A	A	A	A	A	A	A	3R	A	A	-	-	-	-	-	-	-	-
(United States) Maureen Connolly Brinker	-	-	-	-	-	-	-	-	-	-	-	-	-	-	-	-	-	-	-	-	-	-	-	-	A	A	A	2R
(United States) Beverly Baker Fleitz	-	-	-	-	-	-	-	-	-	-	-	-	-	-	-	-	A	A	A	3R	A	A	A	QF	A	A	A	QF
(United Kingdom) Patricia Ward Hales	-	-	-	-	-	-	-	-	-	-	-	-	-	-	-	-	-	-	-	-	-	-	-	-	A	A	1R	A
(France) Simonne Mathieu	NH	R	NH	A	NH	R	NH	A	NH	NH	A	A	A	1R	A	A	-	-	-	-	-	-	-	-	-	-	-	-
(France) Ginette Jucker Bucaille	-	-	-	-	-	-	-	-	-	-	-	-	A	A	3R	A	A	A	2R	A	A	2R	2R	A	A	1R	A	A
(Australia) Nell Hall Hopman	NH	R	NH	A	NH	R	NH	A	NH	NH	A	A	QF	A	A	A	F	4R	A	2R	QF	A	A	A	2R	A	A	A
(Australia) Joan Hartigan Bathurst	NH	R	NH	A	NH	R	NH	A	NH	NH	A	A	QF	A	A	A	2R	3R	A	A	A	A	A	A	A	A	1R	A
(Poland) Jadwiga Jędrzejowska	NH	R	NH	A	NH	R	NH	A	NH	NH	A	A	A	A	3R	A	A	2R	3R	A	A	1R	A	A	-	-	-	-
(Australia) Marie Toomey	NH	R	NH	A	NH	R	NH	A	NH	NH	A	A	SF	A	A	A	QF	A	A	A	F	A	A	A	QF	A	A	A
(Australia) Joyce Fitch	NH	R	NH	A	NH	R	NH	A	NH	NH	A	A	F	A	A	A	QF	A	A	A	A	A	A	A	2R	A	4R	A
(Hungary) Zsuzsa Körmöczy	-	-	-	-	-	-	-	-	-	-	-	-	-	-	-	-	A	1R	QF	A	A	2R	4R	A	A	A	A	A
(United States) Dorothy "Dodo" Bundy Cheney	NH	R	NH	SF	NH	R	NH	SF	NH	NH	A	QF	A	SF	SF	1R	A	A	A	A	A	A	A	2R	A	A	A	A

Notes:

- R = tournament restricted to French nationals and held under German occupation

== 1950–1956 ==
Player	1950				1951				1952				1953				1954				1955				1956			
Player	AUS	FRA	WIM	USA	AUS	FRA	WIM	USA	AUS	FRA	WIM	USA	AUS	FRA	WIM	USA	AUS	FRA	WIM	USA	AUS	FRA	WIM	USA	AUS	FRA	WIM	USA
(United States) Maureen Connolly Brinker	A	A	A	2R	A	A	A	W	A	A	W	W	W	W	W	W	A	W	W	A	Retired							
(United States) Doris Hart	F	W	SF	F	A	F	W	SF	A	W	QF	F	A	F	F	F	A	A	SF	W	A	A	SF	W	-	-	-	-
(United States) Louise Brough Clapp	W	SF	W	3R	A	A	SF	A	A	A	F	SF	A	A	A	SF	A	A	F	F	A	A	W	3R	A	A	SF	QF
(United States) Shirley Fry Irvin	A	QF	QF	QF	A	W	F	F	A	F	SF	SF	A	SF	SF	SF	A	A	QF	SF	A	A	A	QF	A	A	W	W
(United States) Margaret Osborne duPont	A	QF	F	W	A	SF	QF	A	A	A	A	A	A	A	A	QF	A	A	QF	3R	A	A	A	A	A	A	A	QF
(United States) Beverly Baker Fleitz	A	A	A	SF	A	QF	SF	3R	A	A	A	A	A	A	A	A	A	A	A	QF	A	SF	F	QF	A	A	QF	A
(United States) Dorothy Head Knode	A	3R	4R	A	A	A	A	3R	A	SF	4R	A	A	SF	SF	A	A	A	A	1R	A	F	QF	SF	A	3R	2R	QF
(United Kingdom) Angela Mortimer Barrett	-	-	-	-	A	A	2R	A	A	A	3R	QF	A	3R	QF	3R	A	A	QF	A	A	W	2R	1R	A	F	SF	A
(Australia) Thelma Coyne Long	QF	A	3R	A	F	QF	1R	A	W	A	QF	QF	A	A	A	3R	W	A	A	A	F	A	A	A	F	3R	1R	A
(United States) Althea Gibson	A	A	A	2R	A	A	3R	3R	A	A	A	3R	A	A	A	QF	A	A	A	1R	A	A	A	3R	A	W	QF	F
(United States) Patricia Canning Todd	A	F	SF	QF	A	A	A	3R	A	A	SF	A	A	A	A	A	A	A	A	A	A	A	A	A	A	A	A	A
(Australia) Beryl Penrose Collier	1R	A	A	A	QF	A	2R	A	QF	3R	3R	A	QF	A	A	A	2R	A	A	A	W	QF	QF	A	QF	A	A	A
(Australia) Nancye Wynne Bolton	SF	A	A	A	W	A	3R	A	SF	A	A	A	-	-	-	-	-	-	-	-	-	-	-	-	-	-	-	-
(France) Ginette Jucker Bucaille	A	2R	3R	A	A	A	A	A	A	1R	A	A	A	QF	A	A	A	F	3R	A	A	QF	2R	A	A	3R	2R	A
(France) Nelly Adamson Landry	A	A	A	A	A	A	A	A	A	A	4R	1R	A	QF	4R	A	A	SF	2R	A	-	-	-	-	-	-	-	-
(Australia) Jenny Staley Hoad	-	-	-	-	-	-	-	-	2R	A	A	A	2R	A	A	A	F	A	A	A	SF	2R	4R	A	A	QF	4R	2R
(Australia) Helen Angwin	-	-	-	-	2R	A	A	A	F	A	A	A	QF	A	A	A	2R	A	A	A	-	-	-	-	-	-	-	-
(United Kingdom) Patricia Ward Hales	A	A	2R	A	A	A	2R	3R	A	2R	3R	A	A	A	3R	A	A	A	4R	A	A	3R	2R	F	A	A	QF	A
(United States) Julie Sampson Haywood	-	-	-	-	A	A	A	1R	A	A	A	3R	F	3R	QF	1R	-	-	-	-	-	-	-	-	-	-	-	-
(Australia) Nell Hall Hopman	QF	A	A	A	QF	A	A	A	2R	1R	3R	A	2R	1R	3R	2R	QF	1R	1R	2R	QF	2R	2R	2R	2R	1R	2R	1R
(Australia) Mary Carter Reitano	-	-	-	-	-	-	-	-	-	-	-	-	-	-	-	-	SF	A	A	A	SF	1R	4R	A	W	A	A	A
(Australia) Joyce Fitch	SF	A	A	A	SF	A	A	A	-	-	-	-	-	-	-	-	-	-	-	-	-	-	-	-	-	-	-	-
(Australia) Marie Toomey	2R	A	A	A	-	-	-	-	-	-	-	-	-	-	-	-	-	-	-	-	-	-	-	-	-	-	-	-
(Mexico) Yola Ramírez Ochoa	-	-	-	-	-	-	-	-	-	-	-	-	-	-	-	-	-	-	-	-	A	A	A	3R	A	A	A	1R
(Czechoslovakia) Věra Puzejova Suková	-	-	-	-	-	-	-	-	-	-	-	-	-	-	-	-	-	-	-	-	-	-	-	-	A	2R	4R	A
(United Kingdom) Angela Buxton	-	-	-	-	-	-	-	-	A	A	1R	A	A	A	4R	A	A	QF	4R	A	A	3R	QF	3R	A	SF	F	A
(Hungary) Zsuzsa Körmöczy	A	A	A	A	A	A	A	A	A	A	3R	A	A	A	QF	A	A	A	A	A	A	1R	QF	A	A	SF	4R	A
(United States) Darlene Hard	-	-	-	-	-	-	-	-	-	-	-	-	A	A	A	2R	A	A	A	SF	A	2R	SF	3R	A	3R	3R	QF
(United States) Dorothy "Dodo" Bundy Cheney	A	A	A	A	A	A	A	A	A	A	A	A	A	A	A	A	A	A	A	A	A	A	A	3R	A	A	A	A
(South Africa) Sandra Reynolds Price	-	-	-	-	-	-	-	-	-	-	-	-	-	-	-	-	-	-	-	-	-	-	-	-	A	A	2R	A
(Australia) Lorraine Coghlan Robinson	-	-	-	-	-	-	-	-	-	-	-	-	-	-	-	-	-	-	-	-	-	-	-	-	2R	A	A	A
(United Kingdom) Shirley Bloomer Brasher	-	-	-	-	-	-	-	-	A	A	1R	A	A	A	3R	A	A	3R	A	A	A	QF	4R	3R	A	QF	QF	SF
(South Africa) Renée Schuurman Haygarth	-	-	-	-	-	-	-	-	-	-	-	-	-	-	-	-	-	-	-	-	A	A	1R	A	A	A	A	A

== 1957–1963 ==
Player	1957				1958				1959				1960				1961				1962				1963			
Player	AUS	FRA	WIM	USA	AUS	FRA	WIM	USA	AUS	FRA	WIM	USA	AUS	FRA	WIM	USA	AUS	FRA	WIM	USA	AUS	FRA	WIM	USA	AUS	FRA	WIM	USA
(Australia) Margaret Smith	-	-	-	-	-	-	-	-	2R	A	A	A	W	A	A	A	W	QF	QF	SF	W	W	2R	W	W	QF	W	F
(Brazil) Maria Bueno	-	-	-	-	A	SF	QF	QF	A	QF	W	W	QF	SF	W	F	A	QF	A	A	A	A	SF	A	A	A	QF	W
(United States) Althea Gibson	F	A	W	W	A	A	W	W	-	-	-	-	-	-	-	-	-	-	-	-	-	-	-	-	-	-	-	-
(United States) Darlene Hard	A	QF	F	SF	A	A	A	F	A	A	F	SF	A	W	QF	W	A	4R	A	W	QF	A	QF	F	A	2R	SF	QF
(United Kingdom) Ann Haydon-Jones	A	SF	3R	QF	A	QF	SF	3R	A	A	QF	SF	A	4R	SF	QF	A	W	4R	F	A	SF	SF	A	A	F	SF	SF
(United Kingdom) Angela Mortimer Barrett	A	A	3R	A	W	A	F	A	A	A	QF	1R	A	A	QF	A	A	A	W	SF	A	A	4R	A	-	-	-	-
(United Kingdom) Christine Truman Janes	A	1R	SF	3R	A	QF	4R	QF	A	W	4R	F	SF	A	SF	SF	A	QF	F	QF	A	4R	3R	A	2R	SF	4R	QF
(Hungary) Zsuzsa Körmöczy	A	QF	2R	A	A	W	SF	A	A	F	A	A	A	3R	2R	A	A	SF	4R	A	A	4R	2R	A	A	1R	2R	2R
(Australia) Lesley Turner Bowrey	-	-	-	-	-	-	-	-	QF	A	A	A	2R	A	A	A	3R	4R	2R	QF	QF	F	QF	4R	SF	W	4R	A
(United States) Karen Hantze Susman	-	-	-	-	A	A	A	3R	A	A	A	QF	A	A	QF	3R	A	A	QF	3R	A	A	W	3R	A	A	A	A
(South Africa) Sandra Reynolds Price	A	2R	QF	A	A	4R	2R	A	QF	SF	SF	QF	A	SF	F	A	A	4R	SF	A	A	QF	3R	QF	-	-	-	-
(South Africa) Renée Schuurman Haygarth	A	1R	2R	A	A	2R	2R	A	F	3R	1R	2R	A	QF	QF	A	A	4R	SF	A	A	SF	QF	3R	A	3R	QF	A
(Australia) Jan Lehane O'Neill	-	-	-	-	1R	A	A	A	SF	A	A	A	F	QF	4R	QF	F	4R	3R	QF	F	QF	QF	3R	F	QF	3R	A
(Mexico) Yola Ramírez Ochoa	A	3R	2R	A	A	4R	3R	A	A	4R	QF	A	A	F	3R	A	A	F	QF	QF	SF	A	A	A	A	2R	1R	QF
(United States) Louise Brough Clapp	A	A	QF	F	A	A	A	QF	A	A	A	QF	-	-	-	-	-	-	-	-	-	-	-	-	-	-	-	-
(United States) Nancy Richey Gunter	-	-	-	-	A	A	A	1R	A	A	A	3R	A	A	A	QF	A	A	2R	A	A	A	3R	3R	A	4R	QF	SF
(United States) Billie Jean Moffitt King	-	-	-	-	-	-	-	-	A	A	A	1R	A	A	A	3R	A	A	2R	2R	A	A	QF	1R	A	A	F	4R
(United States) Shirley Fry Irvin	W	A	A	A	-	-	-	-	-	-	-	-	-	-	-	-	-	-	-	-	-	-	-	-	-	-	-	-
(United States) Beverly Baker Fleitz	A	A	A	A	A	A	A	SF	A	A	4R	A	-	-	-	-	-	-	-	-	-	-	-	-	-	-	-	-
(United States) Margaret Osborne duPont	A	A	A	A	A	A	QF	3R	A	A	A	A	A	A	A	1R	A	A	A	A	A	A	1R	A	-	-	-	-
(France) Françoise Dürr	-	-	-	-	-	-	-	-	-	-	-	-	A	3R	A	A	A	3R	A	A	A	4R	2R	A	A	4R	2R	A
(Australia) Thelma Coyne Long	A	A	1R	A	2R	4R	4R	2R	1R	A	A	A	-	-	-	-	-	-	-	-	-	-	-	-	-	-	-	-
(United Kingdom) Virginia Wade	-	-	-	-	-	-	-	-	-	-	-	-	-	-	-	-	-	-	-	-	A	A	2R	A	A	A	2R	A
(United States) Patricia Canning Todd	A	A	A	3R	-	-	-	-	-	-	-	-	-	-	-	-	-	-	-	-	-	-	-	-	-	-	-	-
(United States) Dorothy "Dodo" Bundy Cheney	A	A	A	A	A	A	A	A	A	A	A	1R	-	-	-	-	-	-	-	-	-	-	-	-	-	-	-	-
(United Kingdom) Shirley Bloomer Brasher	A	W	4R	QF	A	F	QF	A	A	4R	2R	3R	A	A	3R	A	A	A	2R	A	A	A	A	A	A	A	2R	A
(United States) Dorothy Head Knode	A	F	SF	SF	A	QF	2R	QF	A	A	A	QF	A	A	3R	A	A	A	A	A	A	A	A	4R	A	A	3R	A
(Australia) Kerry Melville Reid	-	-	-	-	-	-	-	-	-	-	-	-	-	-	-	-	-	-	-	-	-	-	-	-	3R	A	A	A
(France) Ginette Jucker Bucaille	A	2R	2R	A	A	3R	A	A	A	3R	A	A	A	A	A	A	A	A	A	A	A	1R	A	A	-	-	-	-
(Australia) Judy Tegart Dalton	1R	A	A	A	1R	A	A	A	1R	A	A	A	A	A	A	A	3R	A	A	A	QF	3R	4R	2R	2R	2R	3R	4R
(United Kingdom) Patricia Ward Hales	A	A	1R	A	A	3R	4R	A	A	3R	3R	A	A	2R	2R	A	A	A	2R	A	-	-	-	-	-	-	-	-
(United States) Carole Caldwell Graebner	-	-	-	-	-	-	-	-	A	A	A	1R	A	A	A	2R	A	A	A	1R	A	A	3R	4R	A	A	3R	4R
(Australia) Lorraine Coghlan Robinson	SF	A	A	A	F	4R	4R	2R	QF	A	A	A	QF	A	A	A	A	A	A	A	2R	A	A	A	A	A	A	A
(Australia) Nell Hall Hopman	2R	A	A	A	1R	A	A	A	2R	1R	2R	2R	1R	A	A	A	2R	1R	1R	A	2R	2R	A	2R	A	A	A	A
(Czechoslovakia) Věra Puzejova Suková	A	SF	3R	A	A	4R	A	A	A	QF	3R	A	A	QF	4R	A	A	4R	QF	A	A	3R	F	QF	A	SF	3R	4R
(Australia) Mary Carter Reitano	QF	A	A	A	SF	1R	1R	A	W	QF	3R	A	SF	A	A	A	SF	4R	2R	A	SF	A	A	A	-	-	-	-
(West Germany) Helga Niessen Masthoff	-	-	-	-	-	-	-	-	-	-	-	-	-	-	-	-	-	-	-	-	-	-	-	-	A	A	2R	2R

== 1964–1970 ==
Player	1964				1965				1966				1967				1968				1969				1970			
Player	AUS	FRA	WIM	USA	AUS	FRA	WIM	USA	AUS	FRA	WIM	USA	AUS	FRA	WIM	USA	AUS	FRA	WIM	USA	AUS	FRA	WIM	USA	AUS	FRA	WIM	USA
(Australia) Margaret Court	W	W	F	4R	W	F	W	W	W	SF	SF	A	A	A	A	A	F	A	QF	QF	W	W	SF	W	W	W	W	W
(United States) Billie Jean Moffitt King	A	A	SF	QF	SF	A	SF	F	A	A	W	2R	A	QF	W	W	W	SF	W	F	F	QF	F	QF	A	QF	F	A
(Brazil) Maria Bueno	A	F	W	W	F	SF	F	SF	A	SF	F	W	A	QF	4R	2R	A	QF	QF	SF	A	A	A	A	A	A	A	A
(United Kingdom) Ann Haydon-Jones	A	A	QF	QF	2R	QF	4R	QF	A	W	SF	A	A	QF	F	F	A	F	SF	SF	SF	F	W	A	-	-	-	-
(United States) Nancy Richey Gunter	A	4R	QF	SF	A	SF	QF	SF	F	F	QF	F	W	A	4R	A	A	W	SF	A	A	SF	QF	F	A	A	A	SF
(Australia) Lesley Turner Bowrey	F	SF	SF	2R	3R	W	QF	A	3R	A	A	A	F	F	QF	SF	SF	A	QF	A	2R	SF	QF	2R	A	A	A	A
(France) Françoise Dürr	A	2R	2R	3R	QF	QF	4R	QF	A	QF	QF	QF	QF	W	3R	SF	A	4R	QF	3R	2R	3R	2R	3R	A	3R	SF	QF
(United Kingdom) Virginia Wade	A	A	2R	4R	A	A	4R	2R	A	A	2R	QF	A	4R	QF	4R	A	A	1R	W	A	2R	3R	SF	A	QF	4R	SF
(United States) Rosemary Casals	A	A	A	3R	A	A	A	1R	A	A	4R	SF	SF	4R	SF	4R	QF	4R	4R	3R	QF	QF	SF	SF	A	QF	SF	F
(Australia) Judy Tegart Dalton	QF	4R	4R	4R	QF	A	3R	3R	QF	4R	4R	3R	QF	4R	QF	4R	SF	A	F	QF	1R	A	QF	A	QF	2R	4R	3R
(Australia) Kerry Melville Reid	2R	A	A	A	3R	A	A	A	SF	1R	3R	SF	SF	SF	3R	4R	3R	4R	3R	A	SF	A	2R	1R	F	1R	4R	QF
(United States) Carole Caldwell Graebner	A	A	4R	F	QF	A	2R	QF	SF	1R	A	A	A	A	2R	4R	A	A	A	1R	A	A	2R	2R	A	A	2R	2R
(West Germany) Helga Niessen Masthoff	A	2R	3R	A	1R	1R	2R	A	A	2R	1R	A	A	A	A	A	A	A	2R	A	A	A	A	A	A	F	QF	A
(United Kingdom) Christine Truman Janes	A	QF	2R	A	3R	A	SF	A	A	A	A	A	A	3R	1R	A	A	A	2R	A	A	A	4R	3R	A	A	A	A
(Australia) Jan Lehane O'Neill	SF	QF	A	A	A	A	A	A	2R	A	A	A	3R	3R	4R	A	A	A	A	A	A	A	A	A	3R	A	A	A
(United States) Karen Hantze Susman	A	QF	3R	QF	A	A	A	A	A	A	A	A	A	A	A	A	A	A	A	A	A	A	A	1R	A	A	A	A
(Soviet Union) Olga Morozova	-	-	-	-	-	-	-	-	A	A	1R	A	A	1R	A	A	A	2R	1R	A	A	3R	4R	A	A	2R	2R	3R
(Australia) Evonne Goolagong Cawley	-	-	-	-	-	-	-	-	-	-	-	-	3R	A	A	A	3R	A	A	A	2R	A	A	A	QF	A	2R	A
(Czechoslovakia) Věra Puzejova Suková	A	QF	2R	A	-	-	-	-	-	-	-	-	-	-	-	-	-	-	-	-	-	-	-	-	-	-	-	-
(United States) Dorothy Head Knode	A	A	A	A	A	A	A	A	A	3R	2R	A	A	1R	1R	A	A	A	A	A	A	1R	A	A	-	-	-	-
(United States) Darlene Hard	A	A	A	A	A	A	A	A	A	A	A	A	A	A	A	A	A	A	A	A	A	A	A	2R	A	A	A	2R
(Hungary) Zsuzsa Körmöczy	A	3R	1R	A	-	-	-	-	-	-	-	-	-	-	-	-	-	-	-	-	-	-	-	-	-	-	-	-
(United Kingdom) Shirley Bloomer Brasher	A	A	A	A	A	A	A	A	A	A	4R	A	A	A	A	A	A	A	4R	A	A	A	2R	A	A	A	3R	A
(Australia) Lorraine Coghlan Robinson	A	A	A	A	A	A	A	A	A	A	A	A	QF	A	A	A	1R	A	A	A	A	A	A	A	A	A	A	A
(Australia) Nell Hall Hopman	A	A	A	A	A	A	A	A	A	1R	A	A	-	-	-	-	-	-	-	-	-	-	-	-	-	-	-	-
(South Africa) Renée Schuurman Haygarth	A	A	2R	A	-	-	-	-	-	-	-	-	-	-	-	-	-	-	-	-	-	-	-	-	-	-	-	-
(Australia) Helen Gourlay Cawley	QF	A	A	A	3R	A	A	A	3R	1R	2R	A	2R	3R	1R	A	1R	3R	4R	A	QF	2R	3R	A	A	1R	2R	QF
(Australia) Wendy Turnbull	-	-	-	-	-	-	-	-	-	-	-	-	-	-	-	-	-	-	-	-	-	-	-	-	2R	A	A	A
(Netherlands) Betty Stöve	A	A	2R	1R	A	3R	1R	A	A	A	3R	A	3R	2R	2R	A	A	A	A	A	A	A	2R	A	A	1R	2R	A
(United States) Sharon Walsh	-	-	-	-	-	-	-	-	-	-	-	-	-	-	-	-	-	-	-	-	A	A	A	1R	A	A	3R	3R

== 1971–1977 ==
Player	1971				1972				1973				1974				1975				1976				1977				
Player	AUS	FRA	WIM	USA	AUS	FRA	WIM	USA	AUS	FRA	WIM	USA	AUS	FRA	WIM	USA	AUS	FRA	WIM	USA	AUS	FRA	WIM	USA	AUS^{J}	FRA	WIM	USA	AUS^{D}
(United States) Chris Evert	A	A	A	SF	A	A	SF	SF	A	F	F	SF	F	W	W	SF	A	W	SF	W	A	A	W	W	A	A	SF	W	A
(United States) Billie Jean Moffitt King	A	A	SF	W	A	W	W	W	A	A	W	3R	A	A	QF	W	A	A	W	A	A	A	A	A	A	A	QF	QF	A
(Australia) Evonne Goolagong Cawley	F	W	W	A	F	F	F	3R	F	SF	SF	F	W	A	QF	F	W	A	F	F	W	A	F	F	A	A	A	A	W
(Australia) Margaret Court	W	3R	F	A	A	A	A	SF	W	W	SF	W	A	A	A	A	QF	A	SF	QF	-	-	-	-	-	-	-	-	-
(United Kingdom) Virginia Wade	A	1R	4R	A	W	QF	QF	QF	QF	3R	QF	QF	A	2R	SF	2R	A	A	QF	SF	A	A	SF	2R	A	A	W	QF	A
(Czechoslovakia) Martina Navratilova	-	-	-	-	-	-	-	-	A	QF	3R	1R	A	QF	1R	3R	F	F	QF	SF	A	A	SF	1R	A	A	QF	SF	A
(Soviet Union) Olga Morozova	A	2R	3R	A	QF	QF	4R	QF	A	2R	QF	3R	A	F	F	A	QF	SF	QF	2R	A	A	QF	3R	-	-	-	-	-
(Australia) Kerry Melville Reid	A	2R	QF	SF	A	4R	3R	F	SF	A	QF	QF	SF	A	SF	QF	2R	A	2R	QF	1R	A	QF	2R	W	A	QF	4R	SF
(United States) Rosemary Casals	A	A	2R	F	A	3R	SF	QF	A	A	QF	QF	A	A	4R	QF	A	A	4R	1R	A	A	QF	QF	A	A	QF	4R	A
(France) Françoise Dürr	A	QF	QF	3R	A	SF	QF	3R	A	SF	4R	1R	A	A	3R	2R	A	A	2R	2R	A	A	4R	4R	A	A	3R	1R	A
(West Germany) Helga Niessen Masthoff	A	1R	3R	A	A	SF	2R	A	A	QF	A	SF	A	SF	QF	A	A	2R	A	A	QF	QF	A	A	A	3R	2R	A	A
(United States) Nancy Richey Gunter	A	SF	QF	3R	A	3R	QF	1R	A	3R	A	3R	A	A	A	QF	A	A	2R	1R	A	A	A	2R	A	3R	A	4R	A
(Australia) Judy Tegart-Dalton	A	A	SF	QF	A	4R	3R	A	A	A	A	A	QF	A	A	A	A	A	2R	A	1R	A	A	A	1R	A	A	A	QF
(Australia) Lesley Turner Bowrey	2R	QF	4R	A	A	A	A	A	3R	A	A	2R	A	A	A	A	1R	A	A	A	QF	A	A	A	1R	A	A	A	A
(United States) Tracy Austin	-	-	-	-	-	-	-	-	-	-	-	-	-	-	-	-	-	-	-	-	-	-	-	-	A	A	3R	QF	A
(Brazil) Maria Bueno	A	A	A	A	A	A	A	A	A	A	A	A	A	A	A	A	A	A	A	A	A	1R	4R	3R	A	A	3R	2R	A
(Romania) Virginia Ruzici	-	-	-	-	-	-	-	-	A	1R	2R	A	A	2R	2R	1R	A	2R	1R	1R	A	SF	1R	QF	A	A	2R	4R	A
(United Kingdom) Christine Truman Janes	A	A	4R	A	A	A	A	A	A	A	1R	A	A	A	3R	A	-	-	-	-	-	-	-	-	-	-	-	-	-
(Australia) Jan Lehane O'Neill	QF	A	A	A	A	A	A	A	A	A	A	A	2R	A	A	A	A	A	A	A	A	A	A	A	2R	A	A	A	A
(United States) Karen Hantze Susman	A	A	A	A	A	A	A	A	A	A	A	A	A	A	A	A	A	A	A	A	A	A	A	1R	A	A	2R	A	A
(United States) Carole Caldwell Graebner	A	A	A	1R	A	A	1R	A	-	-	-	-	-	-	-	-	-	-	-	-	-	-	-	-	-	-	-	-	-
(United Kingdom) Shirley Bloomer Brasher	A	A	2R	A	A	A	2R	A	A	A	1R	A	A	A	2R	A	-	-	-	-	-	-	-	-	-	-	-	-	-
(Australia) Lorraine Coghlan Robinson	A	A	1R	A	-	-	-	-	-	-	-	-	-	-	-	-	-	-	-	-	-	-	-	-	-	-	-	-	-
(Netherlands) Betty Stöve	A	3R	2R	1R	A	3R	4R	3R	A	3R	1R	2R	A	A	1R	2R	A	A	QF	2R	A	A	4R	1R	A	A	F	SF	A
(Australia) Wendy Turnbull	A	A	A	A	2R	A	1R	A	3R	1R	3R	A	2R	A	2R	A	3R	A	1R	A	2R	3R	3R	1R	A	A	2R	F	A
(Czechoslovakia) Renáta Tomanová	-	-	-	-	-	-	-	-	A	3R	1R	A	A	1R	2R	A	A	3R	3R	1R	F	F	3R	3R	A	QF	3R	2R	A
(Australia) Helen Gourlay Cawley	QF	F	1R	2R	SF	4R	2R	1R	A	A	1R	1R	2R	A	3R	2R	2R	A	2R	2R	SF	A	A	3R	SF	3R	4R	2R	F
(United Kingdom) Sue Barker	-	-	-	-	-	-	-	-	A	A	2R	A	3R	A	1R	A	SF	3R	3R	2R	2R	W	QF	4R	A	A	SF	3R	SF
(Socialist Federal Republic of Yugoslavia) Mima Jaušovec	-	-	-	-	-	-	-	-	-	-	-	-	A	2R	3R	2R	A	2R	4R	1R	A	2R	4R	SF	A	W	3R	QF	A
(Romania) Florența Mihai	-	-	-	-	-	-	-	-	-	-	-	-	-	-	-	-	A	1R	A	A	A	SF	1R	1R	A	F	2R	3R	A
(Australia) Dianne Fromholtz Balestrat	1R	A	A	A	A	A	A	A	QF	A	1R	A	2R	3R	1R	3R	3R	3R	1R	2R	A	A	4R	SF	F	A	A	4R	A
(United States) Sharon Walsh	QF	A	A	A	A	1R	2R	3R	A	2R	1R	1R	A	A	2R	2R	A	1R	2R	1R	A	A	A	2R	A	1R	1R	1R	A
(United States) Betsy Nagelsen	-	-	-	-	-	-	-	-	-	-	-	-	A	1R	3R	3R	A	2R	2R	A	A	1R	1R	3R	1R	A	2R	1R	A
(Australia) Christine O'Neil	-	-	-	-	-	-	-	-	1R	A	A	A	1R	A	3R	1R	2R	A	1R	A	1R	1R	A	A	1R	1R	2R	A	A
(United States) Barbara Jordan	-	-	-	-	-	-	-	-	-	-	-	-	-	-	-	-	-	-	-	-	-	-	-	-	A	A	A	3R	A

Notes:

- The Australian Open was held twice in 1977, in January (J) and December (D).

== See also ==
- Tennis performance timeline comparison (men)
