= 1920 in tennis =

This page covers all the important events in the sport of tennis in 1920. It provides the results of notable tournaments throughout the year on both the men's and women's ILTF tennis circuits.

== Australian Open ==
Category	Champion(s)	Finalist(s)	Score
Singles	(Australia) Pat O'Hara Wood	(Australia) Ronald Thomas	6–3, 4–6, 6–8, 6–1, 6–3
Doubles	(Australia) Pat O'Hara Wood (Australia) Ronald Thomas	(Australia) Horace Rice (Australia) Roy Taylor	6–1, 6–0, 7–5

== French Open ==
Not a Grand Slam event.

== Wimbledon ==
Category	Champion(s)	Finalist(s)	Score
Men's singles	(United States) Bill Tilden	(Australia) Gerald Patterson	2–6, 6–3, 6–2, 6–4
Women's singles	(France) Suzanne Lenglen	(United Kingdom) Dorothea Lambert Chambers	6–3, 6–0
Men's doubles	(United States) Chuck Garland (United States) R. Norris Williams	(United Kingdom) Algernon Kingscote (United Kingdom) James Cecil Parke	4–6, 6–4, 7–5, 6–2
Women's doubles	(France) Suzanne Lenglen (United States) Elizabeth Ryan	(United Kingdom) Dorothea Lambert Chambers (United Kingdom) Ethel Larcombe	6–4, 6–0
Mixed doubles	(Australia) Gerald Patterson (France) Suzanne Lenglen	(Australia) Randolph Lycett (United States) Elizabeth Ryan	7–5, 6–3

== US Open ==
Category	Champion(s)	Finalist(s)	Score
Men's singles	(United States) Bill Tilden	(United States) Bill Johnston	6–1, 1–6, 7–5, 5–7, 6–3
Women's singles	(United States) Molla Bjurstedt Mallory	(United States) Marion Zinderstein	6–3, 6–1
Men's doubles	(United States) Bill Johnston (United States) Clarence Griffin	(United States) Roland Roberts (United States) Willis Davis	6–2, 6–2, 6–3
Women's doubles	(United States) Marion Zinderstein (United States) Eleanor Goss	(United States) Eleanor Tennant (United States) Helen Baker	13–11, 4–6, 6–3
Mixed doubles	(United States) Hazel Wightman (United States) Wallace Johnson	(United States) Molla Bjurstedt Mallory (United States) Craig Biddle	6–4, 6–3
