= Western Pennsylvania Championships =

Defunct tennis tournament
- Tour: USNLTA Circuit (1889-1923); ILTF Circuit (1924-69); ILTF Independent Tour (1970-81)
- Founded: 1889; 136 years ago
- Abolished: 1981; 44 years ago
- Location: Mt. Lebanon; Pittsburgh; United States
- Surface: Grass

The Western Pennsylvania Championships formally known as the Western Pennsylvania Amateur Tennis Championships was a men's and women's grass court tennis tournament founded in 1889. The tournament ran annually through till 1981 as part of the ILTF Independent Tour until it was discontinued.

== History ==
In September 1889 the first Tennis Championship of Western Pennsylvania was held with the men's singles event won by a Mr. Christy. In 1910 a women's event was added to the schedule won by Jane Craven. The tournament was an official event of the USNLTA Circuit from 1889 to 1923. In 1924 after the United States National Lawn Tennis Association became a member of the International Lawn Tennis Association it became part of the worldwide ILTF Circuit till 1969. Following the creation of the Grand Prix circuit in 1970 this event became part of the ILTF Independent Tour until 1981.

Previous winners of the men's title has included Bill Tilden II, David O'Loughlin, Larry Dee, George Pryor, Eddie Dibbs and Vitas Gerulaitis. Former winners of the women's singles title included; Hazel Hotchkiss, Mary Browne, Molla Bjurstedt, Martha Guthrie, Shirley Fry, and JoAnne Russell
