= 1915 U.S. National Championships – Women's singles =

Women's singles
- 1915 U.S. National Championships

Final
- Champion: (Norway) Molla Bjurstedt
- Runner-up: (United States) Hazel Hotchkiss Wightman
- Score: 4–6, 6–2, 6–0

Details
- Draw: 73
- Seeds: –

Events
Singles	men	women
Doubles	men	women
- U.S. National Championships

Molla Bjurstedt won the singles tennis title of the 1915 U.S. Women's National Singles Championship by defeating Hazel Hotchkiss Wightman 4–6, 6–2, 6–0 in the final of the All Comer's tournament. The defending champion, Mary Browne, did not participate in this edition and therefore no challenge round was played. The event was played on outdoor grass courts and held at the Philadelphia Cricket Club in Wissahickon Heights, Chestnut Hill, Philadelphia in the United States, from June 8 through June 13, 1915.

== Draw ==
=== All Comers' finals ===
Quarterfinals
(United States) Ann Sheafe	8	2
(Norway) Molla Bjurstedt	10	6
(United States) Martha Guthrie	7	6
(United States) Marion Vanderhoef	5	0
(United States) Eliza Fox	6	6
(United States) Alice Cunningham	2	1
(United States) Hazel Hotchkiss Wightman	6	5	6
(United States) Eleonora Sears	3	7	2

Semifinals
(Norway) Molla Bjurstedt	3	6	6
(United States) Martha Guthrie	6	2	2
(United States) Eliza Fox	1	4
(United States) Hazel Hotchkiss Wightman	6	6

Finals
(Norway) Molla Bjurstedt	4	6	6
(United States) Hazel Hotchkiss Wightman	6	2	0
