= Phyllis Cox Berthoud =

Indian tennis player

Personal information
- Born: Phyllis Hamilton Cox; 8 April 1887 Bengal, British India
- Died: 1975 (aged 88) Warwick, Great Britain

Sport
- Country: India
- Sport: Tennis

Phyllis Cox Berthoud (8 April 1887 – 1975) was an Anglo-Indian tennis player from Bengal, British India. She participated in the Indian Open tennis tournaments between 1918 and 1923. Her entry into a Grand Slam event in 1920 for the Wimbledon singles draw was the first for an Indian woman. She died in Warwick in 1975.
