= 1915 U.S. National Championships (tennis) =

- Date: August 31 – September 8 (M); June 8 – 13 (W)
- Edition: 35th
- Category: Grand Slam
- Surface: Grass
- Location: Forest Hills, Queens; New York City, New York (M); Chestnut Hill, PA, U.S. (W)
- Venue: West Side Tennis Club (M); Philadelphia Cricket Club (W)

Champions

Men's singles
- (United States) William Johnston

Women's singles
- (Norway) Molla Bjurstedt

Men's doubles
- (United States) William Johnston / (United States) Clarence Griffin

Women's doubles
- (United States) Hazel Wightman / (United States) Eleonora Sears

Mixed doubles
- (United States) Hazel Wightman / (United States) Harry Johnson
- U.S. National Championships

The 1915 U.S. National Championships (now known as the US Open) took place on the outdoor grass courts at the West Side Tennis Club, Forest Hills in New York City, New York. The men's singles tournament ran from August 31 until September 8 while the women's singles and doubles championship took place from June 7 to June 12 at the Philadelphia Cricket Club in Chestnut Hill. It was the 35th staging of the U.S. National Championships, the first held at Forest Hills and the second Grand Slam tennis event of the year.

== Relocation to Forest Hills ==
In 1915 the national championship was relocated from Newport, Rhode Island to the West Side Tennis Club at Forest Hills, New York. Already in 1911 an effort was made by a group of tennis players, headed by Karl H. Behr from New York, to relocate the tournament to New York but by a vote of 95 to 60 it was decided to remain in Newport. In early 1915 the issue resurfaced when a group of about 100 tennis players signed a petition in favor of the move, arguing that most tennis clubs, players and fans were located in the New York area and that it would therefore be beneficial for the development of the sport to host the national championship there. This view was opposed by another group of players which included eight former national singles champions. The contentious issue was brought to a vote at the annual United States National Lawn Tennis Association (USNLTA) meeting on February 5, 1915 and with 128 votes in favor and 119 against it was decided to relocate to Forest Hills.

== Finals ==
=== Men's singles ===
(United States) William Johnston defeated (United States) Maurice McLoughlin 1–6, 6–0, 7–5, 10–8

=== Women's singles ===
(Norway) Molla Bjurstedt defeated (United States) Hazel Hotchkiss Wightman 4–6, 6–2, 6–0

=== Men's doubles ===
(United States) William Johnston / (United States) Clarence Griffin defeated (United States) Maurice McLoughlin / (United States) Tom Bundy 2–6, 6–3, 6–4, 3–6, 6–3

=== Women's doubles ===
(United States) Hazel Wightman / (United States) Eleonora Sears defeated (United States) Helen Homans McLean / (United States) G. L. Chapman 10–8, 6–2

=== Mixed doubles ===
(United States) Hazel Wightman / (United States) Harry Johnson defeated (Norway) Molla Bjurstedt / (United States) Irving Wright 6–0, 6–1

Preceded by 1915 Australasian Championships	Grand Slams	Succeeded by 1916 U.S. National Championships
