= 1916 U.S. National Championships (tennis) =

- Date: August 28 – September 5 (M); June 5 – 12 (W)
- Edition: 36th
- Category: Grand Slam
- Surface: Grass
- Location: Forest Hills, Queens; New York City, New York (M); Chestnut Hill, PA, U.S. (W)
- Venue: West Side Tennis Club (M); Philadelphia Cricket Club (W)

Champions

Men's singles
- (United States) R. Norris Williams

Women's singles
- (Norway) Molla Bjurstedt

Men's doubles
- (United States) Bill Johnston / (United States) Clarence Griffin

Women's doubles
- (Norway) Molla Bjurstedt / (United States) Eleonora Sears

Mixed doubles
- (United States) Eleonora Sears / (United States) Willis Davis
- U.S. National Championships

The 1916 U.S. National Championships (now known as the US Open) took place on the outdoor grass courts at the West Side Tennis Club, Forest Hills in New York City, New York. The men's singles tournament ran from August 28 until September 5 while the women's singles and doubles championship took place from June 5 to June 12 at the Philadelphia Cricket Club in Chestnut Hill. It was the 36th staging of the U.S. National Championships, and the only Grand Slam tennis event of the year.

== Finals ==
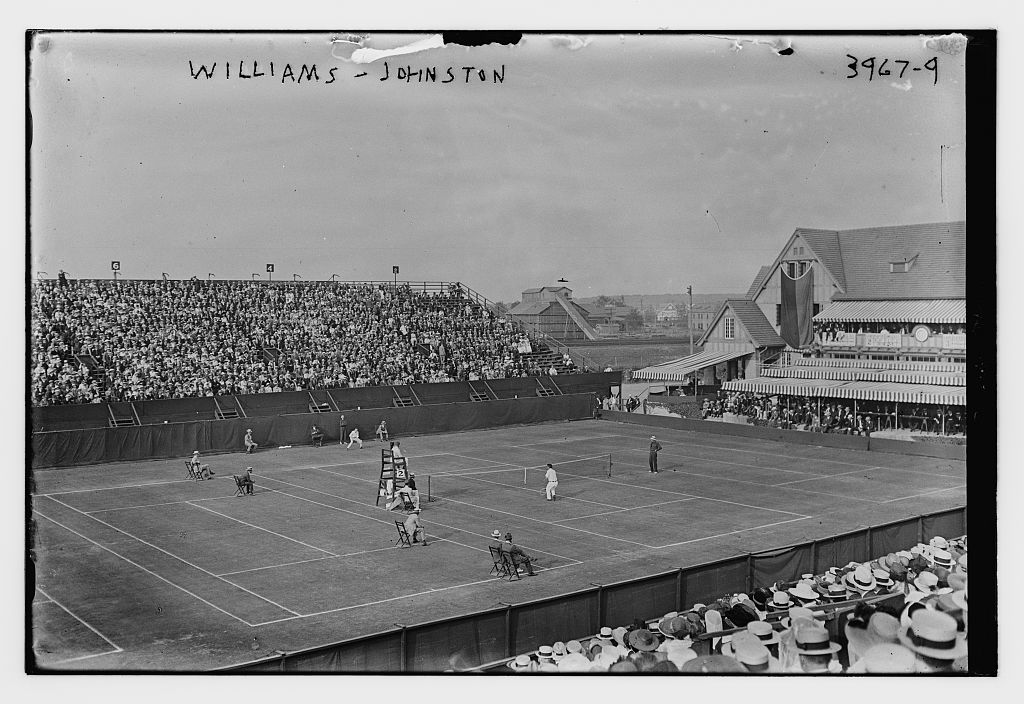
Williams playing Johnston in the final

=== Men's singles ===
(United States) R. Norris Williams defeated (United States) William Johnston 4–6, 6–4, 0–6, 6–2, 6–4

=== Women's singles ===
(Norway) Molla Bjurstedt defeated (United States) Louise Hammond Raymond 6–0, 6–1

=== Men's doubles ===
(United States) Bill Johnston / (United States) Clarence Griffin defeated (United States) Maurice McLoughlin / (United States) Ward Dawson 6–4, 6–3, 5–7, 6–3

=== Women's doubles ===
(Norway) Molla Bjurstedt / (United States) Eleonora Sears defeated (United States) Louise Hammond Raymond / (United States) Edna Wildey 4–6, 6–2, 10–8

=== Mixed doubles ===
(United States) Eleonora Sears / (United States) Willis E. Davis defeated (United States) Florence Ballin / (United States) Bill Tilden 6–4, 7–5

Preceded by 1915 U.S. National Championships	Grand Slams	Succeeded by 1917 U.S. National Championships
