= 1920 U.S. National Championships (tennis) =

- Date: August 30 – September 6 (M); September 20 – 25 (W)
- Edition: 40th
- Category: Grand Slam (ITF)
- Surface: Grass, outdoors
- Location: Forest Hills, Queens, NY, U.S. (M); Chestnut Hill, PA, U.S. (W)
- Venue: West Side Tennis Club (M); Philadelphia Cricket Club (W)

Champions

Men's singles
- (United States) Bill Tilden

Women's singles
- (United States) Molla Bjurstedt Mallory

Men's doubles
- (United States) Bill Johnston / (United States) Clarence Griffin

Women's doubles
- (United States) Marion Zinderstein / (United States) Eleonora Sears

Mixed doubles
- (United States) Hazel Wightman / (United States) Wallace Johnson
- U.S. National Championships

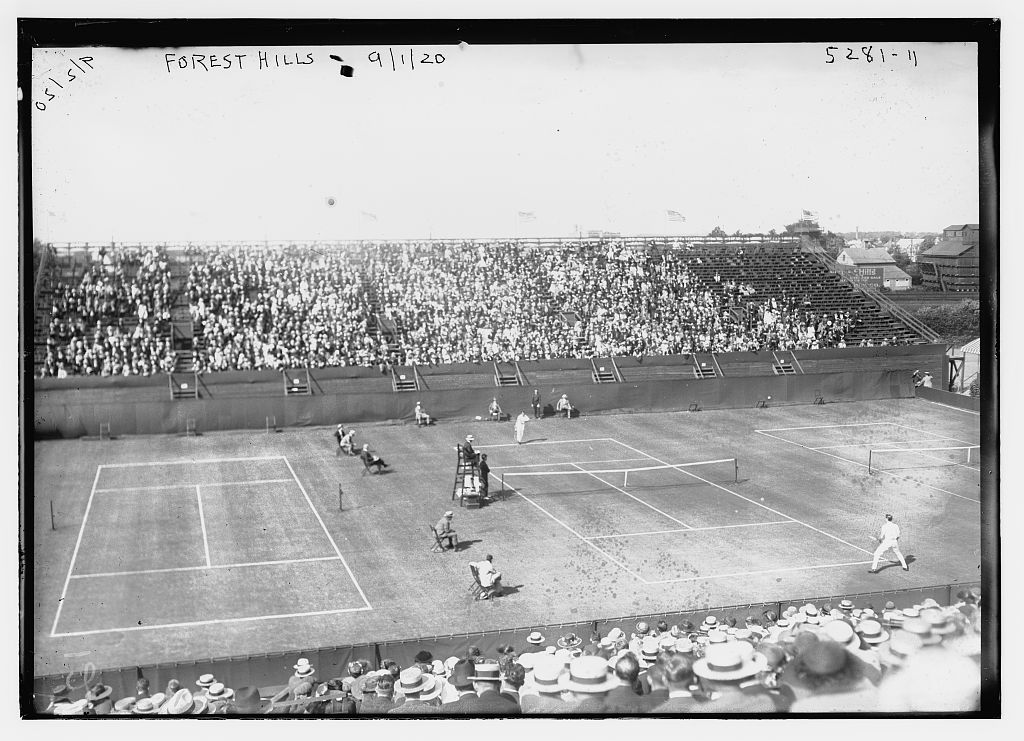
Forest Hills men's singles match on September 1, 1920

The 1920 U.S. National Championships (now known as the US Open) was a tennis tournament that took place on the outdoor grass courts at the West Side Tennis Club, Forest Hills in New York City and the Philadelphia Cricket Club in Chestnut Hill, Philadelphia. The men's tournament, held in New York City, ran from August 30 until September 6, 1920, while the women's event in Chestnut Hill was held from September 20 through September 25, 1920. It was the 40th staging of the U.S. National Championships and the third Grand Slam tennis event of the year.

== Finals ==
=== Men's singles ===
(United States) Bill Tilden defeated (United States) Bill Johnston 6–1, 1–6, 7–5, 5–7, 6–3

=== Women's singles ===
(United States) Molla Bjurstedt Mallory defeated (United States) Marion Zinderstein 6–3, 6–1

=== Men's doubles ===
(United States) Bill Johnston / (United States) Clarence Griffin defeated (United States) Roland Roberts / (United States) Willis Davis 6–2, 6–2, 6–3

=== Women's doubles ===
(United States) Marion Zinderstein / (United States) Eleanor Goss defeated (United States) Eleanor Tennant / (United States) Helen Baker 13–11, 4–6, 6–3

=== Mixed doubles ===
(United States) Hazel Wightman / (United States) Wallace Johnson defeated (United States) Molla Bjurstedt Mallory / (United States) Craig Biddle 6–4, 6–3

Preceded by 1920 Wimbledon Championships	Grand Slams	Succeeded by 1921 Wimbledon Championships
