= 1917 U.S. National Championships – Women's singles =

Women's singles
- 1917 U.S. National Championships

Final
- Champion: (Norway) Molla Bjurstedt
- Runner-up: (United States) Marion Vanderhoef
- Score: 4–6, 6–0, 6–2

Details
- Draw: 46
- Seeds: –

Events
Singles	men	women
Doubles	men	women
- U.S. National Championships

Reigning champion Molla Bjurstedt won the singles tennis title of the 1917 U.S. Women's National Singles Championship by defeating Marion Vanderhoef 4–6, 6–0, 6–2 in the final.

Due to World War I the tournament was renamed National Patriotic Tournament in support of the war effort. No trophies were handed out to the winners and the entrance fees were dedicated to the American Red Cross. Bjurstedt was entitled to sit out the tournament and play the winner of the All Comers' competition in a challenge round but instead elected to play through and therefore no challenge round was held. The event was played on outdoor grass courts and held at the Philadelphia Cricket Club in St. Martin's, Chestnut Hill, Philadelphia in the United States, from June 18 through June 23, 1917.

== Draw ==
=== All Comers' finals ===
Quarterfinals
(Norway) Molla Bjurstedt	6	6
(United States) Phyllis Walsh	4	1
(United States) Flora Brown Harvey	1	6	7
(United States) Teresa Wood	6	4	5
(United States) Marion Vanderhoef	3	6	6
(United States) Susanne White	6	2	2
(United States) Eleanora Sears	6	6
(United States) Mrs. Dahl	2	4

Semifinals
(Norway) Molla Bjurstedt	4	6	6
(United States) Flora Brown Harvey	6	0	0
(United States) Marion Vanderhoef	8	6
(United States) Eleanora Sears	6	3

Finals
(Norway) Molla Bjurstedt	4	6	6
(United States) Marion Vanderhoef	6	0	2
