= Martha Guthrie =

American tennis player

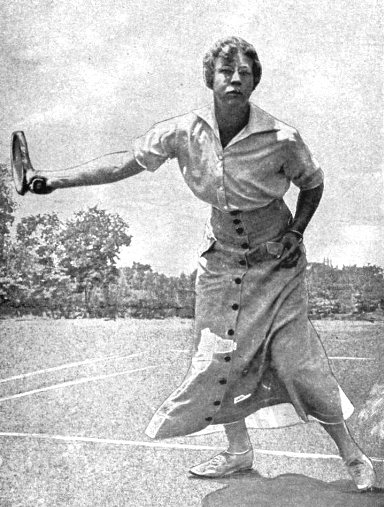
- Martha Guthrie, from a 1919 publication
- Born: 1894; Pittsburgh, Pennsylvania, U.S.
- Died: August 17, 1941 (aged 47); Ohio River, Sewickley, Pennsylvania, U.S.
- Spouse(s): Felix B. Snowden (m. 1917; div. 1937) Edwin S. Hingst (m. 1937)
- Children: 1

Martha Guthrie (1894 – August 17, 1941) was an amateur tennis player in the early part of the 20th century. She was ranked No. 8 in the United States in 1916.

== Biography ==
Guthrie was from Pittsburgh, Pennsylvania. She reached the semifinals at the 1915 U.S. National Championships before falling to future International Tennis Hall of Fame enshrinee Molla Bjurstedt Mallory, 6–3, 2–6, 2–6. She also was a quarterfinalist in doubles that year.

She was a semifinalist at the 1915 U.S. Clay Court Championships, again falling to Mallory. She was a singles finalist, women's doubles winner and mixed doubles winner (with William McEllroy) at the 1915 Ohio State championships. She also won the Allegheny County Championship twice (1914, 1916); the Western Pennsylvania Championships six times (1916, 1919, 1921, 1922, 1923, 1929).

At the Cincinnati Open, then known as the TriState Championships, she won the singles title and the doubles title in 1916. She also played impressively and lost in the final match at the Women's Metropolitan Championships in Forest Hills that year. In 1917, before she married, she won the Florida Women's Tennis Championship in Palm Beach.

As Martha Guthrie Snowden after her marriage in 1917, she continued competing in tennis tournaments, as both a singles and a mixed doubles player.

== Personal life ==
Martha Guthrie married lawyer Felix B. Snowden (or Snowdon) in 1917. They had a daughter born in 1931, also named Martha Guthrie Snowden. They divorced in 1937, with Felix Snowden publicizing his wife's excessive drinking as the cause. She married again in 1937, to Edwin S. Hingst. Martha Guthrie Snowden Hingst died in the Ohio River near Sewickley, Pennsylvania in 1941, in a houseboat fire. She was 47 years old.
