= Teresa Wood =

American neuroscientist

Academic background
- Education: B.A., 1978, Carleton College; Ph.D., 1987, University of California, Los Angeles
- Thesis: Calculated solution-solid relations in the low temperature system Ca-Mg0-Fe0-C0₂-H₂0

Academic work
- Institutions: Rutgers University

Teresa L. Wood is an American neuroscientist.

== Early life and education ==
Wood completed her Bachelor of Arts degree in 1978 from Carleton College and herPh.D. in 1987 from the University of California, Los Angeles.

== Career ==
In November 2019, Wood was elected a Fellow of the American Association for the Advancement of Science for "her research on growth factors and their signaling pathways as they pertain to stem cell differentiation, cancer, and neurodegenerative diseases." Following this, she was appointed the Rena Warshow Endowed Chair in Multiple Sclerosis.
