= 1916 U.S. National Championships – Women's singles =

Women's singles
- 1916 U.S. National Championships

Final
- Champion: (Norway) Molla Bjurstedt
- Runner-up: (United States) Louise Hammond Raymond
- Score: 6–0, 6–1

Details
- Draw: 72
- Seeds: –

Events
Singles	men	women
Doubles	men	women
- U.S. National Championships

In tennis, reigning champion Molla Bjurstedt won the singles tennis title of the 1916 U.S. Women's National Singles Championship by defeating Louise Hammond Raymond 6–0, 6–1 in the challenge round. Hammond Raymond had won the right to challenge Bjurstedt by defeating Eleanora Sears 6–3, 6–4 in the final of the All Comers' competition. The event was played on outdoor grass courts and held at the Philadelphia Cricket Club in Wissahickon Heights, Chestnut Hill, Philadelphia in the United States, from June 5 through June 12, 1916.

== Draw ==
=== Challenge round ===
Challenge Round
(Norway) Molla Bjurstedt	6	6
(United States) Louise Hammond Raymond	0	1

=== All Comers' finals ===
Quarterfinals
(United States) Evelyn Sears	6	6
(United States) Alice Patterson	3	2
(United States) Louise Hammond Raymond	6	6
(United States) Maud Barger-Wallach	1	3
(United States) Eleanora Sears	6	6
(United States) Phyllis Walsh	3	3
(United States) Susanne White	4	8	7
(United States) Mrs. Hall	6	6	5

Semifinals
(United States) Evelyn Sears	2	1
(United States) Louise Hammond Raymond	6	6
(United States) Eleanora Sears	6	6
(United States) Susanne White	2	3

Finals
(United States) Louise Hammond Raymond	6	6
(United States) Eleanora Sears	3	4
