= 1920 U.S. National Championships – Women's singles =

Women's singles
- 1920 U.S. National Championships

Final
- Champion: (United States) Molla Mallory
- Runner-up: (United States) Marion Zinderstein
- Score: 6–3, 6–1

Details
- Draw: 76
- Seeds: –

Events
Singles	men	women
Doubles	men	women
- U.S. National Championships

Molla Mallory defeated Marion Zinderstein 6–3, 6–1 in the final to win the women's singles tennis title at the 1920 U.S. National Championships. The event was played on outdoor grass courts and held at the Philadelphia Cricket Club in Chestnut Hill, Philadelphia from September 20 through September 25, 1920. It was Mallory's fifth U.S. National singles title.

== Draw ==
=== Final eight ===
Quarterfinals
(United States) Helene Pollak	6	8
(United States) Edith Sigourney	3	6
(United States) Molla Mallory	6	2	6
(United States) Eleanor Tennant	2	6	3
(United States) Eleanor Goss	6	6
(United States) Martha Niles	4	2
(United States) Leslie Bancroft	4	2
(United States) Marion Zinderstein	6	6

Semifinals
(United States) Helene Pollak	2	3
(United States) Molla Mallory	6	6
(United States) Eleanor Goss	3	4
(United States) Marion Zinderstein	6	6

Finals
(United States) Molla Mallory	6	6
(United States) Marion Zinderstein	3	1
