= 1918 U.S. National Championships – Women's singles =

Women's singles
- 1918 U.S. National Championships

Final
- Champion: (Norway) Molla Bjurstedt
- Runner-up: (United States) Eleanor Goss
- Score: 6–4, 6–3

Details
- Draw: 37
- Seeds: –

Events
Singles	men	women
Doubles	men	women
- U.S. National Championships

Molla Bjurstedt defeated Eleanor Goss 6–4, 6–3 in the challenge round to win the women's singles tennis title at the 1918 U.S. National Championships. The event was played on outdoor grass courts and held at the Philadelphia Cricket Club in Chestnut Hill, Philadelphia in the United States from June 17 through June 22, 1918. It was the last edition of the event with a challenge round.

== Draw ==
=== Challenge round ===
Challenge Round
(Norway) Molla Bjurstedt	6	6
(United States) Eleanor Goss	4	3

=== Final eight ===
Quarterfinals
(United States) Dorothy Walker	1	0
(United States) Helene Pollak	6	6
(United States) Clare Cassel	6	6
(United States) Eleanora Sears	2	2
(United States) Helen Ledoux	6	6
(United States) Barbara Hooker	4	1
(United States) Emily Stokes Weaver	2	4
(United States) Eleanor Goss	6	6

Semifinals
(United States) Helene Pollak	6	6
(United States) Clare Cassel	3	0
(United States) Helen Ledoux	3	4
(United States) Eleanor Goss	6	6

Finals
(United States) Helene Pollak	6	7
(United States) Eleanor Goss	2	5
