= Marion Vanderhoef =

American tennis player

Marion Wyckoff Vanderhoef
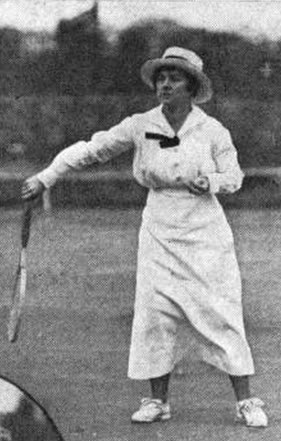
- Marion Vanderhoef Morse, from a 1919 publication.
- Country (sports): United States
- Born: December 6, 1894; New York, NY, U.S.
- Died: June 9, 1985 (aged 90); New London, CT, U.S.

Singles

Grand Slam singles results
- US Open: F (1917)

Marion Wyckoff Vanderhoef (December 6, 1894, New York – June 9, 1985) was a female tennis player from the United States who played in the first quarter of the 20th century.

Vanderhoef reached the quarterfinals of the U.S. National Championships in 1915 which she lost in straight sets to Martha Guthrie. In 1917 she achieved the best performance of her career by reaching the finals of the U.S. National Championships, that year renamed to National Patriotic Tennis Tournament, but was defeated by the Norwegian reigning champion Molla Mallory in three sets.

She married Harry Franklin Morse, a shipping and shipbuilding executive, on 6 April 1918 in New York.

== Grand Slam finals ==
=== Singles (1 runner-up) ===
Result	Year	Championship	Surface	Opponent	Score
Loss	1917	U.S. Championships	Grass	(Norway) Molla Bjurstedt	6–4, 0–6, 2–6
