= 1920 Wimbledon Championships – Women's singles =

Women's singles
- 1920 Wimbledon Championships

Final
- Champion: (France) Suzanne Lenglen
- Runner-up: (United Kingdom) Dorothea Lambert Chambers
- Score: 6–3, 6–0

Details
- Draw: 50
- Seeds: –

Events
Singles	men	women		boys	girls
Doubles	men	women	mixed	boys	girls
← 1919 ·	Wimbledon Championships	· 1921 →

Dorothea Lambert Chambers defeated Elizabeth Ryan 6–2, 6–1 in the All Comers' Final, but the reigning champion Suzanne Lenglen defeated Lambert Chambers 6–3, 6–0 in the Challenge Round to win the Ladies' Singles at the 1920 Wimbledon Championships.

== Draw ==
=== Key ===
- Q = Qualifier
- WC = Wild card
- LL = Lucky loser
- Alt = Alternate
- SE = Special exempt
- PR = Protected ranking
- ITF = ITF entry
- JE = Junior exempt
- w/o = Walkover
- r = Retired
- d = Defaulted
- SR = Special ranking

=== Challenge round ===
Challenge Round
(United Kingdom) Dorothea Lambert Chambers	3	0
(France) Suzanne Lenglen	6	6

=== All comers' finals ===
Quarterfinals
(United Kingdom) Violet Pinckney	w/o
(United States) Elizabeth Ryan
(United Kingdom) Phyllis Satterthwaite	4	4
(United Kingdom) Mabel Parton	6	6
(United Kingdom) Helen Leisk	3	1
(United States) Molla Mallory	6	6
(United Kingdom) Dorothea Lambert Chambers	3	6	6
(United Kingdom) Winifred McNair	6	0	2

Semifinals
(United States) Elizabeth Ryan	6	6
(United Kingdom) Mabel Parton	4	2
(United States) Molla Mallory	0	3
(United Kingdom) Dorothea Lambert Chambers	6	6

Final
(United States) Elizabeth Ryan	2	1
(United Kingdom) Dorothea Lambert Chambers	6	6

=== Top half ===
==== Section 1 ====
First round
(United States) Elizabeth Ryan
(India) Mrs EH Berthoud	w/o

Second round
(United Kingdom) Mrs FS Warburg	1	2
(United Kingdom) Violet Pinckney	6	6
(United Kingdom) A Currie	9	4
(United Kingdom) Mrs RWF Harding	11	6
(United Kingdom) Winifred Beamish	6	6
(United Kingdom) Vera Youle	3	2
(United Kingdom) Aurea Edgington	1	2
(United States) E Ryan	6	6

Third round
(United Kingdom) V Pinckney	6	6
(United Kingdom) Mrs RWF Harding	0	0
(United Kingdom) W Beamish	7	4
(United States) E Ryan	9	6

Quarterfinals
(United Kingdom) V Pinckney	w/o
(United States) E Ryan

==== Section 2 ====
First round
(United Kingdom) Dorothy Kemmis-Betty	1	1
(United Kingdom) Phyllis Satterthwaite	6	6
(United Kingdom) IE Ward	2	2
(United Kingdom) Ruth Winch	6	6
(United Kingdom) Norah Middleton	2	0^{r}
(United Kingdom) Dorothy Holman	6	0
(United Kingdom) Mrs HA Davis	6	6
(United Kingdom) Mrs AA Hall	4	2
(United Kingdom) Mabel Parton	6	6
(United Kingdom) Mrs CE Hunter	1	2
(United Kingdom) MB Holmes	6	6
(United Kingdom) Nora Durlacher	3	1
(United Kingdom) Ethel Larcombe	w/o
(United Kingdom) E Tighe
(United Kingdom) Eleanor Rose	6	4	6
(United Kingdom) Mrs HC Hextall	4	6	4

Second round
(United Kingdom) P Satterthwaite	6	6
(United Kingdom) R Winch	1	1
(United Kingdom) D Holman	6	6
(United Kingdom) Mrs HA Davis	0	1
(United Kingdom) M Parton	6	2	6
(United Kingdom) MB Holmes	1	6	2
(United Kingdom) E Tighe	6	0	7
(United Kingdom) E Rose	4	6	5

Third round
(United Kingdom) P Satterthwaite	6	6
(United Kingdom) D Holman	2	3
(United Kingdom) M Parton	6	6
(United Kingdom) E Tighe	3	2

Quarterfinals
(United Kingdom) P Satterthwaite	4	4
(United Kingdom) M Parton	6	6

=== Bottom half ===
==== Section 3 ====
First round
(Australia) Sylvia Lance	1	6	6
(United Kingdom) Mrs LH Wimble	6	2	1
(United Kingdom) Dorothy Shepherd	11	6
(South Africa) Olive Winslow	9	3
(United Kingdom) RC Cole	w/o
(United Kingdom) Helen Leisk
(United Kingdom) O Manser	2	1
(United Kingdom) Phyllis Howkins	6	6
(United States) Molla Mallory
(United Kingdom) Edith Johnson	w/o
(United Kingdom) Dora Geen	6	6
(United Kingdom) Doris Craddock	3	4
(United Kingdom) NE Black	3	6
(United Kingdom) Margaret McKane	6	8
(France) Marie Decugis	3	1
(United Kingdom) Peggy Dransfield	6	6

Second round
(Australia) S Lance	2	4
(United Kingdom) D Shepherd	6	6
(United Kingdom) H Leisk	8	1	6
(United Kingdom) P Howkins	6	6	2
(United States) M Mallory	6	7
(United Kingdom) D Geen	3	5
(United Kingdom) M McKane	2	2
(United Kingdom) P Dransfield	6	6

Third round
(United Kingdom) D Shepherd	3	4
(United Kingdom) H Leisk	6	6
(United States) M Mallory	5	6	6
(United Kingdom) P Dransfield	7	0	1

Quarterfinals
(United Kingdom) H Leisk	3	1
(United States) M Mallory	6	6

==== Section 4 ====
First round
(United Kingdom) Mrs J O'Neill	7	3	3
(United Kingdom) Gladys Lamplough	5	6	6

Second round
(United Kingdom) G Lamplough	0	1
(United Kingdom) Dorothea Lambert Chambers	6	6
(United Kingdom) CM Everard	w/o
(United Kingdom) Agnes Tuckey
(United Kingdom) Winifred McNair	6	6
(United Kingdom) Mrs DK Hole	3	2
(United Kingdom) Evelyn Colyer	1	6	3
(United Kingdom) Kitty McKane	6	4	6

Third round
(United Kingdom) D Lambert Chambers	7	6
(United Kingdom) A Tuckey	5	2
(United Kingdom) W McNair	6	4	6
(United Kingdom) McKane	3	6	2

Quarterfinals
(United Kingdom) D Lambert Chambers	3	6	6
(United Kingdom) W McNair	6	0	2

Preceded by 1919 U.S. National Championships – Women's singles	Grand Slam women's singles	Succeeded by 1920 U.S. National Championships – Women's singles
