= Helen Baker (tennis) =

American tennis player

- Country (sports): United States

Doubles

Grand Slam doubles results
- US Open: F (1920)

Helen Baker was an American tennis player. In 1920, she was a runner-up in the women's doubles at the US Open (then U.S. National Championships), paired with Eleanor Tennant, and they lost 6–3, 6–1 against Marion Zinderstein and Eleanor Goss.

== Grand Slam finals ==
=== Doubles: (1 runner-up) ===
Result	Year	Championship	Surface	Partner	Opponents	Score
Loss	1920	U.S. Championships	Grass	(United States) Eleanor Tennant	(United States) Eleanor Goss (United States) Marion Zinderstein	3–6, 1–6
