= Eleanor Tennant =

American tennis player and coach

- Born: 1895
- Died: May 11, 1974 (aged 78–79)

Doubles

Grand Slam doubles results
- US Open: Loss (1920)

Coaching career
- Alice Marble; Bobby Riggs; Pauline Betz; Maureen Connolly

Eleanor "Teach" Tennant (1895 – May 11, 1974) was a tennis player and coach from the U.S., notable for the being the first female player to turn professional. Tennant was once ranked third in America and was the coach of Grand Slam winners Alice Marble, Bobby Riggs, Pauline Betz, and Maureen Connolly. Tennant also coached Hollywood stars including Clark Gable and Carole Lombard, who gave her the nickname Teach.

== Grand Slam finals ==
=== Doubles: (1 runner-up) ===
Result	Year	Championship	Surface	Partner	Opponents	Score
Loss	1920	U.S. Championships	Grass	(United States) Helen Baker	(United States) Eleanor Goss (United States) Marion Zinderstein	3–6, 1–6
