= Marion Zinderstein =

American tennis player

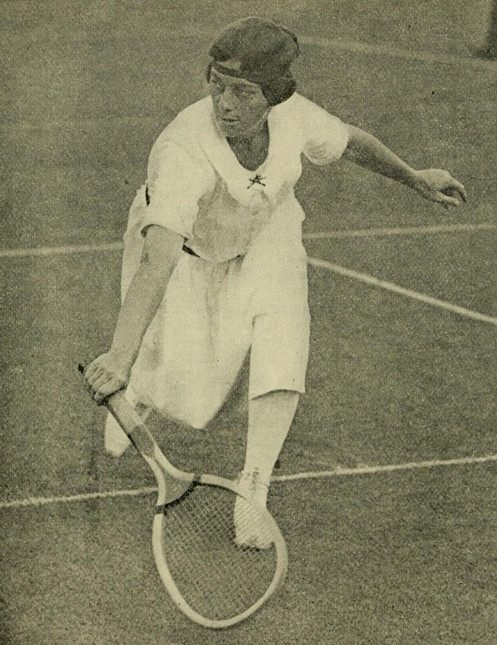
- Zinderstein, circa 1920
- Full name: Marion Hall Zinderstein
- Country (sports): United States
- Born: May 6, 1896 Allentown, Pennsylvania, U.S.
- Died: August 14, 1980 (aged 84) [[Wilmington, Delaware]], U.S.
- Height: 5 ft 4 in (1.63 m)
- Turned pro: 1916 (amateur circuit)
- Retired: 1944
- Plays: Right-handed

Singles
- Career record: 297- 69 (81.1%)
- Career titles: 33
- Highest ranking: 8 (1921)

Grand Slam singles results
- Wimbledon: QF (1924)
- US Open: F (1919, 1920)

Doubles

Grand Slam doubles results
- US Open: W (1918, 1919, 1920, 1922)

Grand Slam mixed doubles results
- US Open: W (1919)
Medal record
Olympic Games
Silver medal – second place	1924 Paris	Mixed doubles

Marion Hall Zinderstein (May 6, 1896 – August 14, 1980) also known by her married name Marion Jessup, and also known as Marion Jessup MacLure, was a tennis player from the United States. At the 1924 Paris Olympics, she won a silver medal in the mixed doubles event partnering Vincent Richards.

== Career ==
Marion Zinderstein twice reached the singles finals of the U.S. National Championships. In 1919, she defeated reigning champion Molla Bjurstedt from Norway in the semifinals in straight sets and then lost to compatriot Hazel Hotchkiss Wightman in the final, 1–6, 2–6. A year later, 1920, Bjurstedt avenged the previous year's semifinal defeat and Zinderstein suffered a heavy loss in the final, 3–6, 1–6.

In 1924, she became national singles indoor champion when she defeated Lillian Scharman, 6–2, 6–3, in the indoor tournament at Brookline, Massachusetts. She successfully defended the title in 1925, beating Anna Fuller Hubbard in the final.

In 1976, she was inducted into the Delaware Sports Hall of Fame.

== Personal ==
Her parents were Charles Zinderstein (1866–1902) and Elizabeth Schmalz, both children of German immigrants. Her father and grandfather were in the silk milling business in Allentown, Pennsylvania. After her father's death, the family moved to West Newton, Massachusetts in 1912, where they lived on Prince Street. Marion married John Butler Jessup in 1921. After his death, she married Henry MacLure, whom she also survived. She had two children.

== Grand Slam finals ==
=== Singles: 2 (2 runners-up) ===
Result	Year	Championship	Surface	Opponent	Score
Loss	1919	U.S. Championships	Grass	(United States) Hazel Hotchkiss	1–6, 2–6
Loss	1920	U.S. Championships	Grass	(United States) Molla Mallory	3–6, 1–6

=== Doubles: (4 wins, 1 runner-up) ===
Result	Year	Championship	Surface	Partner	Opponents	Score
Win	1918	U.S. Championships	Grass	(United States) Eleanor Goss	(United States) Molla Mallory (Norway) Anna Rogge	7–5, 8–6
Win	1919	U.S. Championships	Grass	(United States) Eleanor Goss	(United States) Eleonora Sears (United States) Hazel Hotchkiss	10–8, 9–7
Win	1920	U.S. Championships	Grass	(United States) Eleanor Goss	(United States) Eleanor Tennant (United States) Helen Baker	6–3, 6–1
Win	1922	U.S. Championships	Grass	(United States) Helen Wills	(United States) Molla Mallory (United States) Edith Sigourney	6–4, 7–9, 6–3
Loss	1924	U.S. Championships	Grass	(United States) Eleanor Goss	(United States) Helen Wills (United States) Hazel Hotchkiss	4–6, 3–6

=== Mixed doubles: 1 (1 win) ===
Result	Year	Championship	Surface	Partner	Opponents	Score
Win	1919	U.S. Championships	Grass	(United States) Vincent Richards	(United States) Florence Ballin (United States) Bill Tilden	2–6, 11–9, 6–2
