= Molla Mallory =

Norwegian-American tennis player

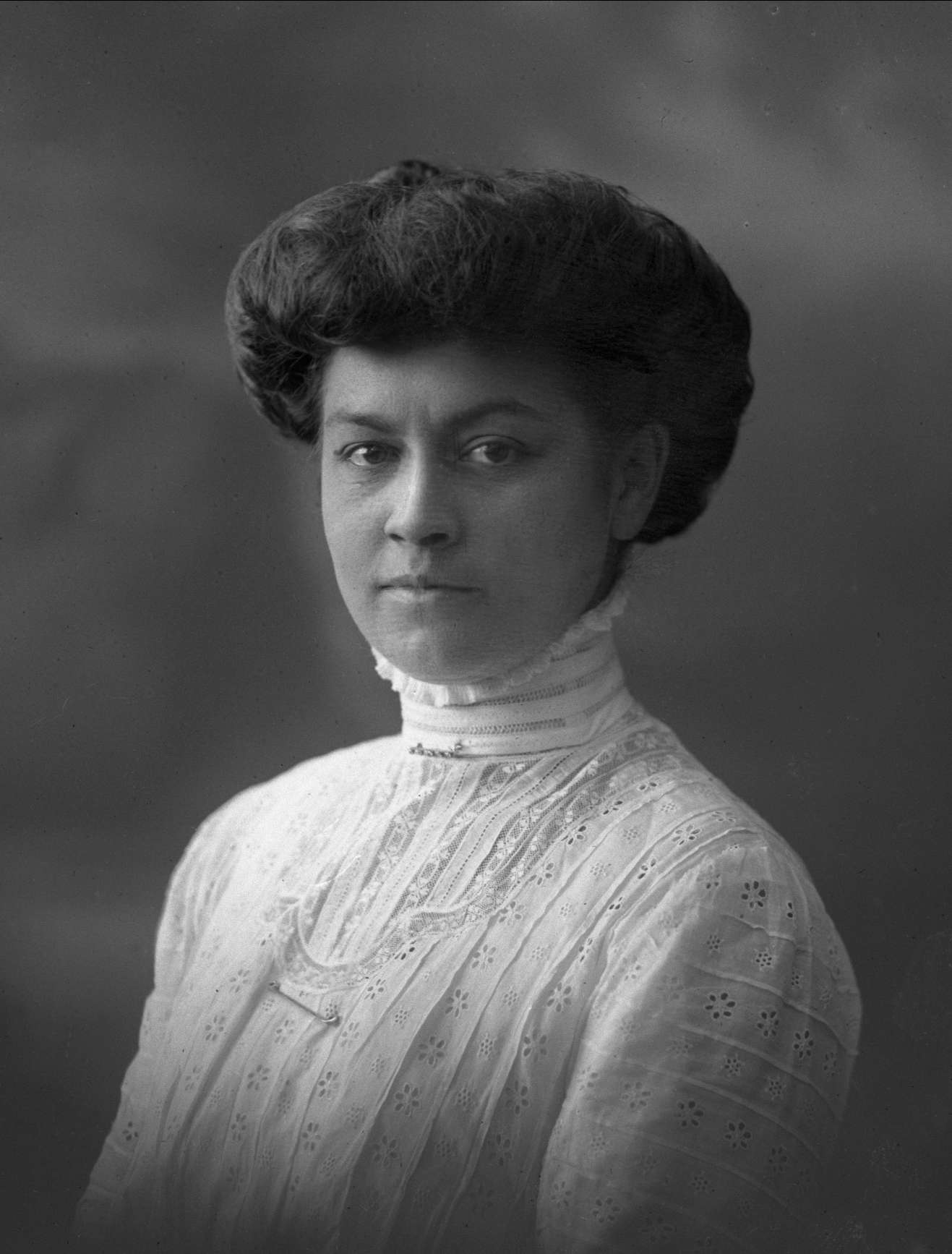
- Mallory photographed by Gustav Borgen in 1909
- Full name: Anna Margrethe Bjurstedt Mallory
- Country (sports): Norway; United States
- Born: 6 March 1884 Mosvik, Norway
- Died: 22 November 1959 (aged 75) Stockholm, Sweden
- Plays: Right-handed
- Int. Tennis HoF: 1958 (member page)

Singles
- Career record: 668-87 (88.5%)
- Career titles: 100
- Highest ranking: No. 1 (US ranking)

Grand Slam singles results
- French Open: 2R (1928)
- Wimbledon: F (1922)
- US Open: W (1915, 1916, 1917, 1918, 1920, 1921, 1922, 1926)

Doubles
- Career record: 0–0

Grand Slam doubles results
- US Open: W (1916, 1917)

Grand Slam mixed doubles results
- US Open: W (1917, 1922, 1923)
Medal record
Representing Norway
Olympic Games – Tennis
Bronze medal – third place	1912 Stockholm	Singles

Anna Margrethe "Molla" Bjurstedt Mallory (née Bjurstedt; 6 March 1884 – 22 November 1959) was a Norwegian-American tennis player, at one time ranked number 2 in the world. She won a record eight singles titles at the U.S. National Championships. She was the first woman to represent Norway at the Olympics.

== Tennis career ==
Although she had won a bronze medal in singles for Norway at the 1912 Summer Olympics in Stockholm, and was the many-time champion of her homeland, Mallory was relatively unknown when she arrived in New York City to begin work as a masseuse in 1915. She entered the U.S. Indoor Championships that year unheralded, and beat Marie Wagner 6–4, 6–4, which was the first of her five singles titles at that tournament. She also won the singles title in Cincinnati in 1915.

Mallory had less in the way of stroke equipment than most tennis champions, but she was a fierce competitor, running with great endurance. Robert Kelleher, a former president of the United States Tennis Association (USTA) and a ball boy during Mallory's era, once said "She looked and acted tough when she was on the court hitting tennis balls. She walked around in a manner that said you'd better look out or she'd deck you. She was an indomitable scrambler and runner. She was a fighter."

She held that a woman could not sustain a volleying attack in a long match. "I do not know a single girl who can play the net game." Therefore, she relied on her baseline game, consisting of strong forehand attacks and a ceaseless defense that wore down her opponents. She took the ball on the rise and drove it from corner to corner to keep her opponent on the constant run. Her quick returns made her passing shots extremely effective. She once said "I find that the girls generally do not hit the ball as hard as they should. I believe in always hitting the ball with all my might, but there seems to be a disposition to 'just get it over' in many girls whom I have played. I do not call this tennis."

Her second-round match with Suzanne Lenglen at the 1921 U.S. National Championships brought Mallory her greatest celebrity. Before the match, Bill Tilden advised Mallory to "hit the cover off the ball." Once the match began, Mallory "attacked with a vengeance" and was ahead 2–0 (40–0) when Lenglen began to cough. Mallory won the first set 6–2 and was up 40–0 on Lenglen's serve in the first game of the second set when Lenglen began to weep and walked to the umpire's stand and informed the official that she was ill and could not continue. After the match, the USTA accused Lenglen of feigning illness. The French Tennis Federation (FTF) exonerated Lenglen and accepted her testimony (and a doctor's) that she had been ill. However, Albert de Joannis, vice president of the FTF who accompanied Lenglen during her trip to the United States, quit his post in protest of the FTF's conclusion. He claimed that Lenglen was "perfectly fit" during the match and that, "She was defeated by a player who on that date showed a better brand of tennis."

Lenglen avenged the loss by defeating Mallory 6–2, 6–0 in 26 minutes in the 1922 Wimbledon final, the shortest final in a Grand Slam tournament on record. Lenglen reportedly said to Mallory after the match, "Now, Mrs. Mallory, I have proved to you today what I could have done to you in New York last year", to which Mallory replied, "Mlle. Lenglen, you have done to me today what I did to you in New York last year; you have beaten me." However, Kathleen McKane Godfree has said that Lenglen denied this exchange. Lenglen claimed that she merely said "thank you" to Mallory and coughed suggestively behind her hand. This was to remind Mallory that she – Lenglen – had indeed had whooping cough in their New York match the previous year. The two played for the last time that summer in Nice, France, with Lenglen winning 6–0, 6–0. This completed the head-to-head rivalry between the players, with Lenglen winning their first match at the 1921 World Hard Court Championships 6–3, 6–2, after which Mallory said about Lenglen, "She is just the steadiest player that ever was. She just sent back at me whatever I sent at her and waited for me to make a fault. And her returns often enough were harder than the shots I sent up to her."

Mallory won the singles title at the U.S. Championships a record eight times in 15 attempts, winning the last of her titles at the age of 42, in 1926. Her worst finish there was a quarterfinal loss in 1927, when she was 43. In 1926, Mallory hit one of the heights of her career when she came back from 0–4 in the third set of the final against Elizabeth Ryan, saving a match point in winning her eighth championship. Her farewell to the U.S. Championships was as a 45-year-old semifinalist in 1929, losing to Helen Wills Moody 6–0, 6–0. Mallory is the only woman other than Chris Evert to have won the U.S. Championships four consecutive times.

Molla also won multiple titles at other tournaments such as the Middle States Championships which she won a record seven times (1915, 1921–22, 1924–25, 1927–28). She also won the Seabright Invitational Tournament three times (1921–23).

She died on 22 November 1959, aged 75, in Stockholm, Sweden.

== Legacy ==
According to A. Wallis Myers of The Daily Telegraph and the Daily Mail, Mallory was ranked in the world top 10 from 1921 (when the rankings for women began) through 1927, reaching a career high of world No. 2 in those rankings in 1921 and 1922. She was ranked in the U.S. top 10 for 13 consecutive years from 1915 through 1928 (no rankings were issued in 1917) and was top-ranked from 1915 through 1922 and in 1926.

Mallory was inducted into the International Tennis Hall of Fame in 1958.

In 1916, she co-wrote the book Tennis for Women with Samuel Crowther.

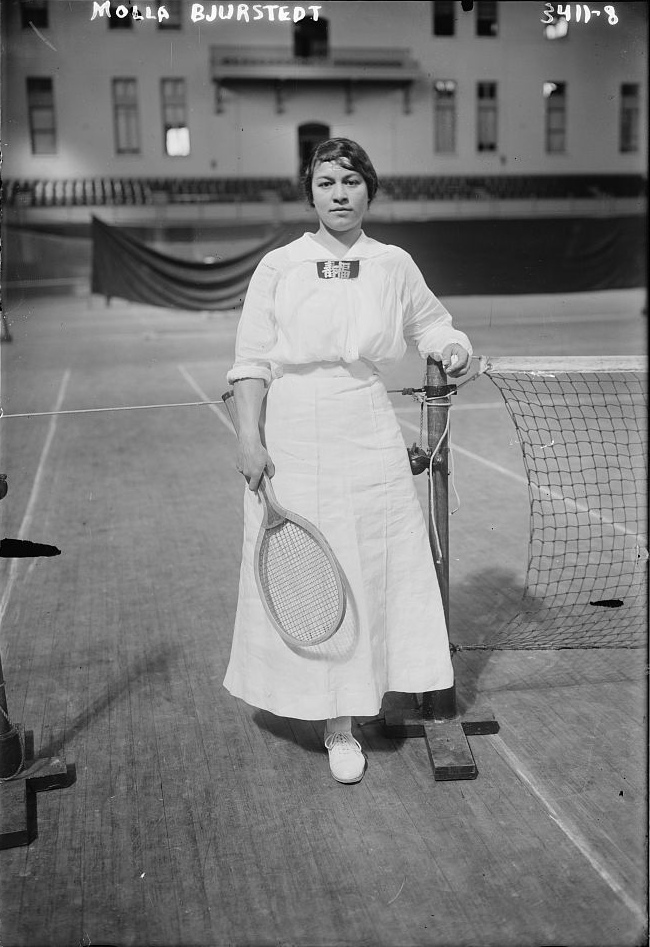
Molla Bjurstedt at the 1915 Women's National Indoor Tennis Tournament at the Seventh Regiment Armory, New York City

== Grand Slam finals ==
=== Singles: 11 (8 titles, 3 runners-up) ===
Result	Year	Championship	Surface	Opponent	Score
Win	1915	U.S. National Championships	Grass	(United States) Hazel Hotchkiss Wightman	4–6, 6–2, 6–0
Win	1916	U.S. National Championships	Grass	(United States) Louise Hammond Raymond	6–0, 6–1
Win	1917	U.S. National Championships	Grass	(United States) Marion Vanderhoef	4–6, 6–0, 6–2
Win	1918	U.S. National Championships	Grass	(United States) Eleanor Goss	6–4, 6–3
Win	1920	U.S. National Championships	Grass	(United States) Marion Zinderstein	6–3, 6–1
Win	1921	U.S. National Championships	Grass	(United States) Mary Browne	4–6, 6–4, 6–2
Loss	1922	Wimbledon	Grass	(France) Suzanne Lenglen	2–6, 0–6
Win	1922	U.S. National Championships	Grass	(United States) Helen Wills	6–3, 6–1
Loss	1923	U.S. National Championships	Grass	(United States) Helen Wills	2–6, 1–6
Loss	1924	U.S. National Championships	Grass	(United States) Helen Wills	1–6, 3–6
Win	1926	U.S. National Championships	Grass	(United States) Elizabeth Ryan	4–6, 6–4, 9–7

=== Doubles: 4 (2 titles, 2 runners-up) ===
Result	Year	Championship	Surface	Partner	Opponents	Score
Win	1916	U.S. National Championships	Grass	(United States) Eleonora Sears	(United States) Louise Hammond Raymond (United States) Edna Wildey	4–6, 6–2, 10–8
Win	1917	U.S. National Championships	Grass	(United States) Eleanora Sears	(United States) Phyllis Walsh (United States) Grace Moore LeRoy	6–2, 6–4
Loss	1918	U.S. National Championships	Grass	(Norway) Anna Rogge	(United States) Eleanor Goss (United States) Marion Zinderstein	5–7, 6–8
Loss	1922	U.S. National Championships	Grass	(United States) Edith Sigourney	(United States) Helen Wills (United States) Marion Zinderstein	4–6, 9–7, 3–6

=== Mixed doubles: 8 (3 titles, 5 runners-up) ===
Result	Year	Championship	Surface	Partner	Opponents	Score
Loss	1915	U.S. National Championships	Grass	(United States) Irving Wright	(United States) Harry Johnson (United States) Hazel Hotchkiss Wightman	0–6, 1–6
Win	1917	U.S. National Championships	Grass	(United States) Irving Wright	(United States) Bill Tilden (United States) Florence Ballin	10–12, 6–1, 6–3
Loss	1918	U.S. National Championships	Grass	(United States) Fred Alexander	(United States) Irving Wright (United States) Hazel Hotchkiss Wightman	2–6, 3–6
Loss	1920	U.S. National Championships	Grass	(United States) Craig Biddle	(United States) Wallace Johnson (United States) Hazel Hotchkiss Wightman	4–6, 3–6
Loss	1921	U.S. National Championships	Grass	(United States) Bill Tilden	(United States) Bill Johnston (United States) Mary Browne	6–3, 4–6, 3–6
Win	1922	U.S. National Championships	Grass	(United States) Bill Tilden	(United States) Howard Kinsey (United States) Helen Wills	6–4, 6–3
Win	1923	U.S. National Championships	Grass	(United States) Bill Tilden	(Australia) John Hawkes (United Kingdom) Kitty McKane	6–3, 2–6, 10–8
Loss	1924	U.S. National Championships	Grass	(United States) Bill Tilden	(United States) Vincent Richards (United States) Helen Wills	8–6, 5–7, 0–6

== Grand Slam singles tournament timeline ==
Key
W	F	SF	QF	#R	RR	Q#	DNQ	A	NH

(W) winner; (F) finalist; (SF) semifinalist; (QF) quarterfinalist; (#R) rounds 4, 3, 2, 1; (RR) round-robin stage; (Q#) qualification round; (DNQ) did not qualify; (A) absent; (NH) not held; (SR) strike rate (events won / competed); (W–L) win–loss record.

Tournament	1909	1910	1911	1912	1913	1914	1915	1916	1917	1918	1919	1920	1921	1922	1923	1924	1925	1926	1927	1928	1929	Career SR	Career Win–loss
Australian Championships	NH	NH	NH	NH	NH	NH	NH	NH	NH	NH	NH	NH	NH	A	A	A	A	A	A	A	A	0 / 0	0–0
French Championships^{1}	R	R	R	A	A	A	NH	NH	NH	NH	NH	A	A	A	A	NH	A	A	A	2R	A	0 / 1	1–1
Wimbledon	2R	A	A	A	A	A	NH	NH	NH	NH	A	SF	QF	F	QF	2R	A	SF	3R	1R	3R	0 / 10	23–14
U.S. Championships	A	A	A	A	A	A	W	W	W	W	SF	W	W	W	F	F	SF	W	QF	SF	SF	8 / 15	65–7
SR	0 / 1	0 / 0	0 / 0	0 / 0	0 / 0	0 / 0	1 / 1	1 / 1	1 / 1	1 / 1	0 / 1	1 / 2	1 / 3	1 / 2	0 / 2	0 / 2	0 / 1	1 / 2	0 / 2	0 / 3	0 / 2	8 / 26	89–22

R = tournament restricted to French nationals.

^{1}Through 1923, the French Championships were open only to French nationals. The World Hard Court Championships (WHCC), actually played on clay in Paris or Brussels, began in 1912 and were open to all nationalities. The results from that tournament are shown here from 1912 through 1914 and from 1920 through 1923. The Olympics replaced the WHCC in 1924, as the Olympics were held in Paris. Beginning in 1925, the French Championships were open to all nationalities, with the results shown here beginning with that year.

== Personal life ==
She was the daughter of Major Axel Johan Bjurstedt (born 1848) and Anna Benedicte Jenssen (born 1854); Anna Benedicte was the daughter of landowner Benedict Jenssen.

On 3 September 1919, she married stockbroker Franklin Mallory in New York City.

== See also ==
- Performance timelines for all female tennis players since 1978 who reached at least one Grand Slam final
