= List of tennis timelines =

Tennis timelines

The following article lists tennis players with the most weeks held as No. 1, most Grand Slam tournament titles won and most ATP 1000 and WTA 1000 titles won tabulated in chronological order.

The records listed below are from the Amateur Era (before 1968) and the Open Era (after 1968). During the Amateur Era, only amateurs were allowed to compete in Grand Slam tournaments and other events organized or sanctioned by the ILTF. when Grand Slam tournaments agreed to open their events to allow professional players to compete with amateurs.

== Most weeks ranked No. 1 in the Open Era ==
The following rankings points are only from the Open Era when the rankings began to be computerized.

=== Men's singles ===
==== Weeks as No. 1 leaders ====
Year span	Player	Date achieved	Duration	Record
2021–present	(Serbia) **Novak Djokovic**	March 8, 2021	5 years, 8 months	**428**
2012–2021	(Switzerland) Roger Federer	July 16, 2012	8 years, 7 months	310
1999–2012	(United States) Pete Sampras	August 2, 1999	12 years, 11 months	286
1990–1999	(Czechoslovakia) Ivan Lendl	July 30, 1990	9 years	270
1975–1990	(United States) Jimmy Connors	May 5, 1975	15 years, 2 months	268
1973–1975	(Romania) Ilie Năstase	August 23, 1973	1 year, 8 months	40

Current record in bold.

=== Women's singles ===
==== Weeks at No. 1 leaders ====
Year span	Player	Date achieved	Duration	Record
1996–present	(Germany) **Steffi Graf**	21 May 1996	30 years, 5 months	**377**
1986–1996	(United States) Martina Navratilova	31 March 1986	10 years, 1 month	332
1985–1986	(United States) Chris Evert	24 June 1985	9 months	260
1985–1985	(United States) Martina Navratilova	27 May 1985	28 days	240
1975–1985	(United States) Chris Evert	3 November 1975	9 years, 6 months	238

Current record in bold.

=== Men's doubles ===
==== Weeks at No. 1 leaders ====
Year span	Player	Date achieved	Duration	Record
2012–present	(United States) **Mike Bryan**	November 5, 2012	14 years	**506**
2011–2012	(United States) Bob Bryan (United States) Mike Bryan	December 12, 2011	10 months	299
1980–2011	(United States) John McEnroe	December 15, 1980	30 years, 11 months	269
1978–1980	(South Africa) Frew McMillan	September 4, 1978	2 years, 3 months	85
1976–1978	(Mexico) Raúl Ramírez	May 31, 1976	2 years, 3 months	62
1976–1976	(South Africa) Bob Hewitt	March 1, 1976	2 months	6

Current record in bold.

=== Women's doubles ===
==== Weeks at No. 1 leaders ====
Year span	Player	Date achieved	Duration	Record
1986–present	(United States) **Martina Navratilova**	May 26, 1986	40 years, 5 months	**237**
1985–1986	(United States) Pam Shriver	September 30, 1985	7 months	44
1984–1985	(United States) Martina Navratilova	September 4, 1984	1 year	27

Current record in bold.

== Chronological list of Grand Slam titles leaders ==
=== Men's singles ===
==== Most majors won leaders ====
Year span	Player	Record
2021–2022; 2023–present	**Novak Djokovic**	**24**
2020–2023	Rafael Nadal	22
2009–2022	Roger Federer	20
1999–2009	Pete Sampras	14
1966–2000	Roy Emerson	12
1924–1967	Bill Tilden	10
1882–1883; 1883–1884; 1884–1885; 1885–1886; 1886–1925	Richard Sears	7
1882–1887; 1889–1925	William Renshaw	7
1911–1925	William Larned	7
1879–1883	John Hartley	2
1878–1880	Frank Hadow	1
1877–1880	Spencer Gore	1

Current record in bold.

=== Women's singles ===
==== Most majors won leaders ====
Year span	Player	Record
1970–present	**Margaret Court**	**24**
1928–1970	Helen Wills Moody	19
1925–1929	Suzanne Lenglen	8
1922–1926; 1926–1929	Molla Mallory	8
1913–1926	Dorothea Douglass; Lambert Chambers	7
1889–1891; 1899–1914	Blanche Bingley	6
1888–1900	Lottie Dod	5
1889–1891	Bertha Townsend	2
1884–1891	Maud Watson	2

Current record in bold.

=== Men's doubles ===
==== Most majors won leaders ====
Year span	Player	Record
2018–present	**(United States) Mike Bryan**	**18**
1974–2018	(Australia) John Newcombe	17
1966–1976	(Australia) Roy Emerson	16
1947–1969	(Australia) Adrian Quist	14
1934–1948	(France) Jacques Brugnon	10
1902–1948	(United Kingdom) Laurence Doherty (United Kingdom) Reginald Doherty	10
1882–1903	(United States) Richard Sears	6
1882–1885	(United States) James Dwight	3
1881–1882	(United States) Clarence Clark (United States) Fred Taylor	1

Current record in bold.

=== Women's doubles ===
==== Most majors won leaders ====
Year span	Player	Record
1986–present	**(United States) Martina Navratilova**	**31**
1950–1986	(United States) Louise Brough Clapp (United States) Margaret Osborne duPont	21
1925–1926; 1926–1954	(United States) Elizabeth Ryan	17
1925–1926	(France) Suzanne Lenglen	8
1895–1926	(United States) Juliette Atkinson	7
1895–1896	(United States) Helen Hellwig	2
1891–1896	(United States) Mabel Cahill	2
1891–1892	(United States) Emma Leavitt-Morgan	1
1890–1892	(United States) Ellen Roosevelt (United States) Grace Roosevelt	1
1889–1892	(United States) Bertha Townsend (United States) Margarette Ballard	1

Current record in bold.

=== Mixed slams ===
==== Most majors won leaders ====
Year span	Player	Record
1968–present	**(Australia) Margaret Court**	**21**
1953–1969	(United States) Doris Hart	15
1928–1953	(United States) Elizabeth Ryan	9
1915–1930	(United States) Hazel Hotchkiss Wightman	6
1896–1918	(United States) Edwin Fischer	4
1896–1898	(United States) Juliette Atkinson	3
1891–1898	(United Kingdom) Mabel Cahill	3
1887–1892	(United States) Joseph S. Clark	2
1887–1888	(United States) L. Stokes	1

Current record in bold.

== Chronological list of 1000 titles leaders ==
Records before 1990 not listed here.

=== Men's singles ===
==== Most 1000s won leaders ====
Year span	Player	Record
2016–2018; 2020–present	(Serbia) **Novak Djokovic**	**40**
2010–2016; 2016–2016; 2017–2020; 2021–2021	(Spain) Rafael Nadal	36
2012–2012; 2012–2013	(Switzerland) Roger Federer	28
1990–1990; 1995–1999; 1999–2000; 2001–2010	(United States) Andre Agassi	17
1994–1995; 1995–1996; 1999–2001	(United States) Pete Sampras	11
1990–1990	(Austria) Thomas Muster	8
1990–1990; 1992–1992	(United States) Michael Chang	7
1993–1995	(United States) Jim Courier	5
1990–1993	(Sweden) Stefan Edberg	4
1990–1990	(Soviet Union) Andrei Chesnokov	2
1990–1990	(Spain) Juan Aguilera	1

Current record in bold.

=== Men's doubles ===
==== Most 1000s won leaders ====
Masters doubles leaders
Year span	Player	Record
2013–present	**(United States) Bob Bryan** **(United States) Mike Bryan**	**39**
2008–2013	(Canada) Daniel Nestor	28
1993–2009	(Australia) Todd Woodbridge	18
1993–2001	(Australia) Mark Woodforde	14
1994–1994; 1994–1995; 1995–1995; 1995–1996; 1996–1997	(Netherlands) Paul Haarhuis	10
1994–1994	(United States) Patrick Galbraith	3
1990–1990; 1993–1994	(Czech Republic) Petr Korda	3
1990–1990; 1991–1992; 1993–1994	(United States) Jim Courier	3
1990–1992; 1993–1994	(France) Guy Forget	3

Masters doubles leaders (continued)
Year span	Player	Record
1990–1990; 1991–1994	(Spain) Sergio Casal (Spain) Emilio Sánchez	3
1990–1990; 1992–1992	(Germany) Boris Becker	2
1992–1992	(United States) Ken Flach (United States) Todd Witsken	2
1991–1992	(Australia) John Fitzgerald (Sweden) Anders Järryd	2
1990–1990	(Australia) Darren Cahill (Australia) Mark Kratzmann	1
1990–1990	(United States) Paul Annacone (United States) David Wheaton	1
1990–1990	(Spain) Sergi Bruguera	1
1990–1990	(Czech Republic) Tomáš Šmíd	1
1990–1990	(United States) Rick Leach (United States) Jim Pugh	1

Current record in bold.

=== Women's singles ===
==== Most 1000s won leaders ====
Year span	Player	Record
2013–present	**(United States) Serena Williams**	**23**
2002–2014	(Switzerland) Martina Hingis	17
1993–2006	(Germany) Steffi Graf	15
1990–1990; 1990–1992	(United States) Monica Seles	9
1992–1993	(Argentina) Gabriela Sabatini	5
1990–1990	(United States) Martina Navratilova	3

Current record in bold.

=== Women's doubles ===
==== Most 1000s won leaders ====
Year span	Player	Record
2017–present	**(Switzerland) Martina Hingis**	**26**
2012–2017	(United States) Lisa Raymond	24
1991–1993; 1993–2012	(Belarus) Natasha Zvereva	23
1990–1990	(Czech Republic) Jana Novotná	14
1992–1992; 1992–1993; 1993–1994	(Latvia) Larisa Savchenko-Neiland	10
1990–1991	(United States) Martina Navratilova	9
1990–1990	(Czech Republic) Helena Suková	5
1990–1990	(United States) Anne Smith	1

Current record in bold.

== ATP Masters 1000 events ==
Twelve tournaments have been held as ATP Masters 1000 events, with nine being played each year. They have been played on three different surfaces:

=== Events ===
Hard court
Year span	City	Tournament
(1990–present)	Indian Wells	Indian Wells Open
(1990–present)	Miami	Miami Open
(1990–present)	Montreal /Toronto	Canadian Open
(1990–present)	Cincinnati	Cincinnati Open
(2009–present)	Shanghai	Shanghai Masters
(2007–present)	Paris	Paris Masters
(1998–2001)	Stuttgart	Stuttgart Masters
(2002–2008)	Madrid	Madrid Open

Clay court
Year span	City	Tournament
(2009–present)	Madrid	Madrid Open
(1990–present)	Rome	Italian Open
(1990–present)	Roquebrune-Cap- Martin	Monte-Carlo Masters
(1990–2008)	Hamburg	Hamburg Masters

Carpet court
Year span	City	Tournament
(1990–1994)	Stockholm	Stockholm Open
(1995–1997)	Stuttgart	Stuttgart Masters
(1990–2006)	Paris	Paris Masters

== Tier I/Premier Mandatory & 5/1000 events ==
=== Events ===
Defunct
Year span	City	Tournament
1990	Chicago	Ameritech Cup
1991–1992	Boca Raton	Virginia Slims of Florida
1993–2011	Tokyo	Pan Pacific Open
1990–2008	Hilton Head/ Charleston	Charleston Open
1990–2008	Berlin	German Open
1993–1995	Philadelphia	Advanta Championships of Philadelphia
1993–2007	Moscow	Kremlin Cup
1997–2008	Zürich	Zurich Open
2004–2007	San Diego	San Diego Open
2023–2024	Guadalajara	Guadalajara Open Akron

Current
Year span	City	Tournament
2008, 2012–2014, 2018–, 2020–, 2022–, 2024–	Doha	Qatar Open
2009–2011, 2015–2017, 2019–, 2021–, 2023–	Dubai	Dubai Championships
1996–2019, 2021–	Indian Wells	Indian Wells Open
1990–2019, 2021–	Miami	Miami Open
2009–2019, 2021–	Madrid	Madrid Open
1990–	Rome	Italian Open
1990–2019, 2021–	Montreal/ Toronto	Canadian Open
2009–	Cincinnati	Cincinnati Open
2009–2019, 2023–	Beijing	China Open
2014–2019, 2024–	Wuhan	Wuhan Open

== See also ==
- Tennis performance timeline comparison (men)
- Tennis performance timeline comparison (women) (1978–present)
- Tennis performance timeline comparison (women) (1884–1977)
