= CM Rackets =

Spanish tennis racket manufacturer

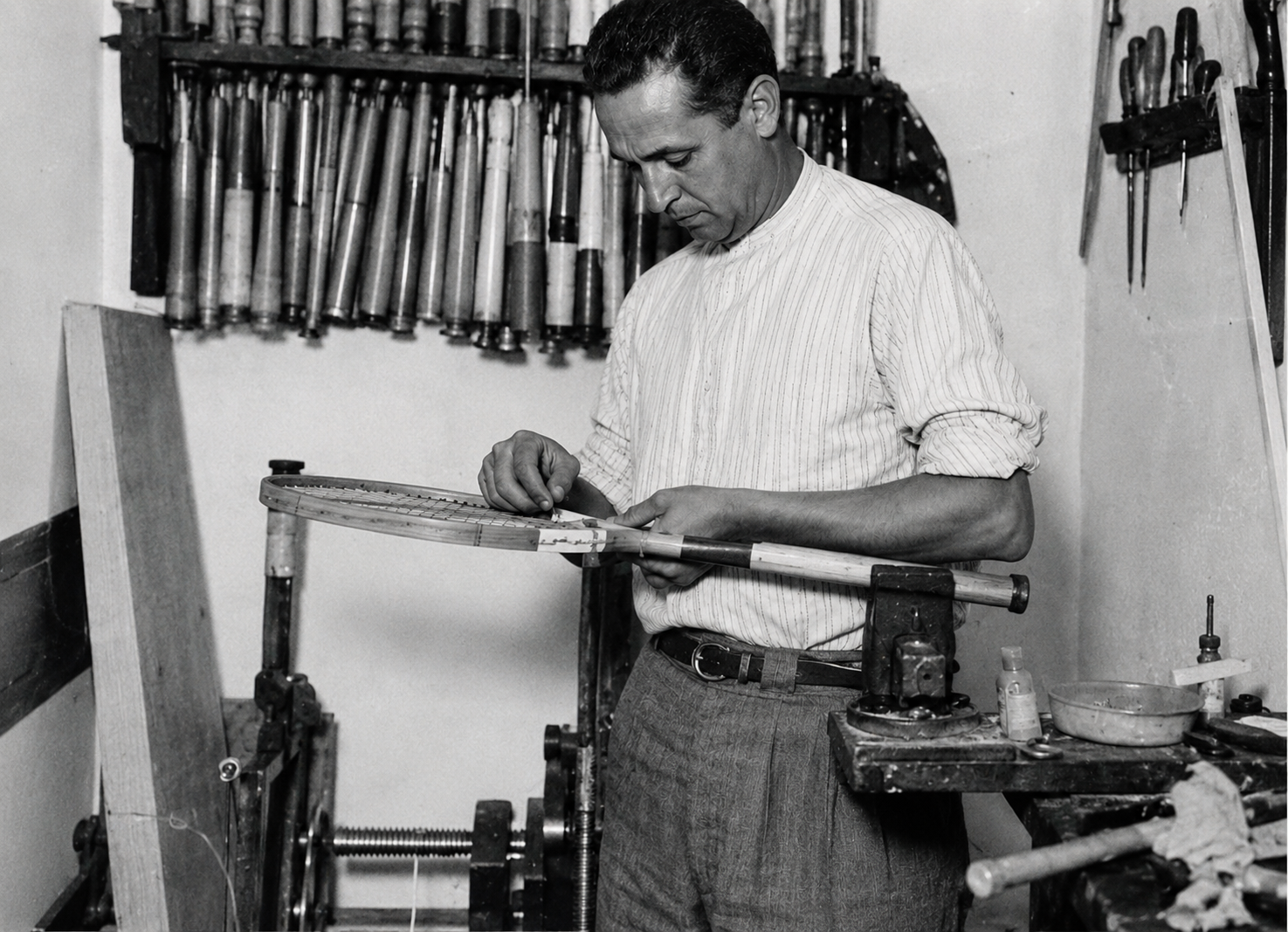
- Llasat working in his small workshop, barely one meter wide.
- Type: Public limited company
- Industry: Sports equipment
- Founded: 1905
- Founder: Joaquín Llasat
- Fate: Defunct
- Headquarters: 237 Muntaner Street, Barcelona, Spain
- Area served: Spain, South America
- Products: Wooden tennis rackets

C.M. Rackets Llasat was a Spanish tennis racket brand manufactured in Barcelona by Joaquín Llasat during the first half of the 20th century, cementing its market presence alongside contemporary brands like Puig Superflex. The company specialized in the production of wooden tennis rackets and was headquartered at 237 Muntaner Street, Barcelona. Founded by the Llasat family in 1905, the company was later incorporated as a public limited company.

The avant-garde work of cabinetmaker Joaquín Llasat helped establish a craft-based tennis racket industry, which later expanded into South America.

== History ==
At the beginning of the 20th century, tennis racket manufacturing was dominated by companies based in the United Kingdom, France, the United States, and Australia. In Spain, tennis racket manufacturing began to develop during the early 20th century.

Their activity coincided with the expansion of women's tennis in Spain during the first decades of the 20th century. According to historical studies on women's sports, in 1940 there were 734 registered female players across the country's various racket sports.

C.M. Llasat tennis rackets were first manufactured by Joaquín Llasat, who initially worked daytime shifts at a carpentry workshop. At night he began crafting wooden rackets by hand, using only the light of a hydrocarbon (carbide) lamp held by his father.

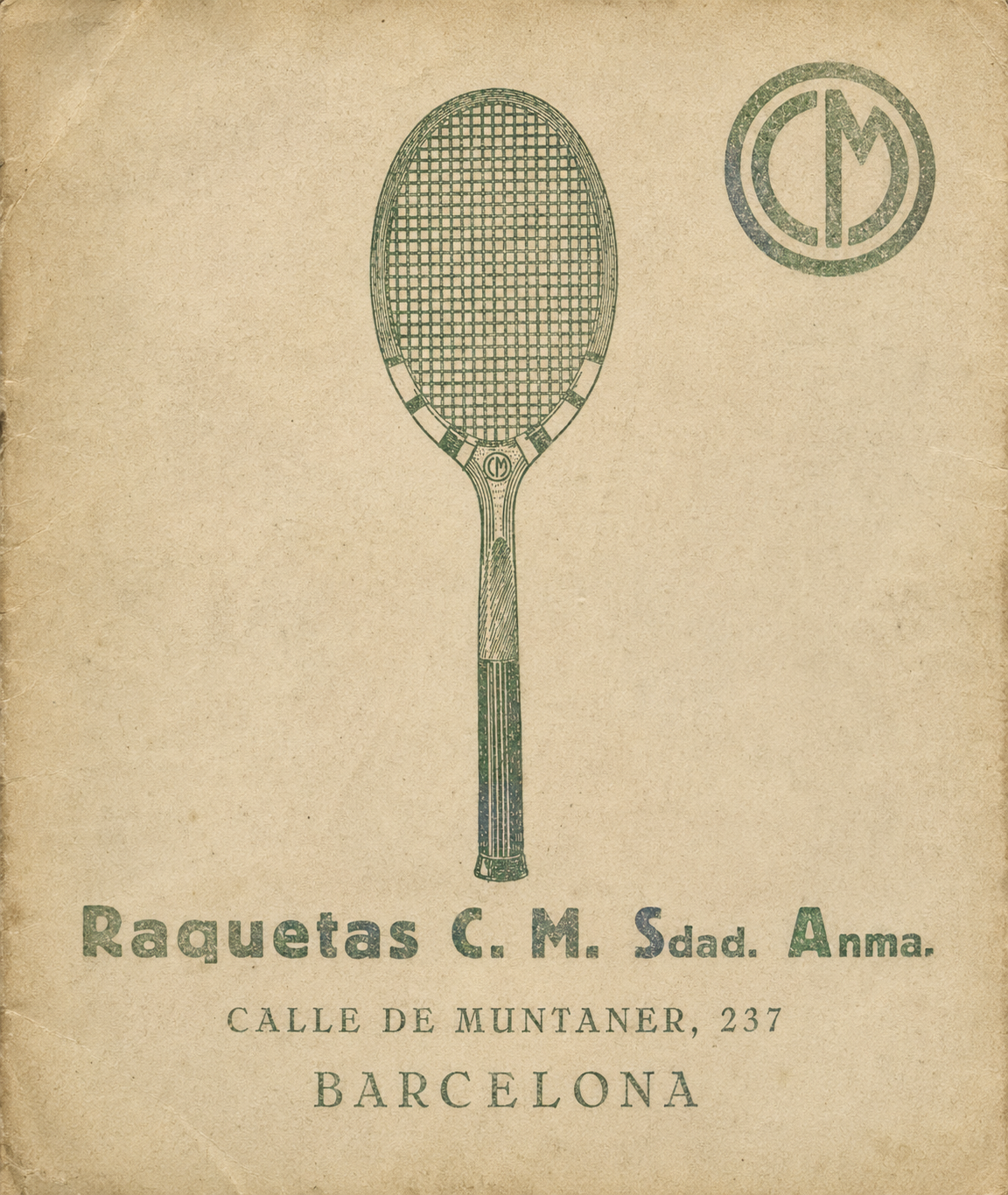
Promotional leaflet for Raquetas CM in Barcelona

In 1930, his son, Joaquín Llasat Jr., moved to Argentina to expand the business, where the company had already been exporting rackets through distributor José Olavarría. Meanwhile, Joaquín Llasat Sr. remained in Spain, continuing racket production at his workshop in Barcelona.

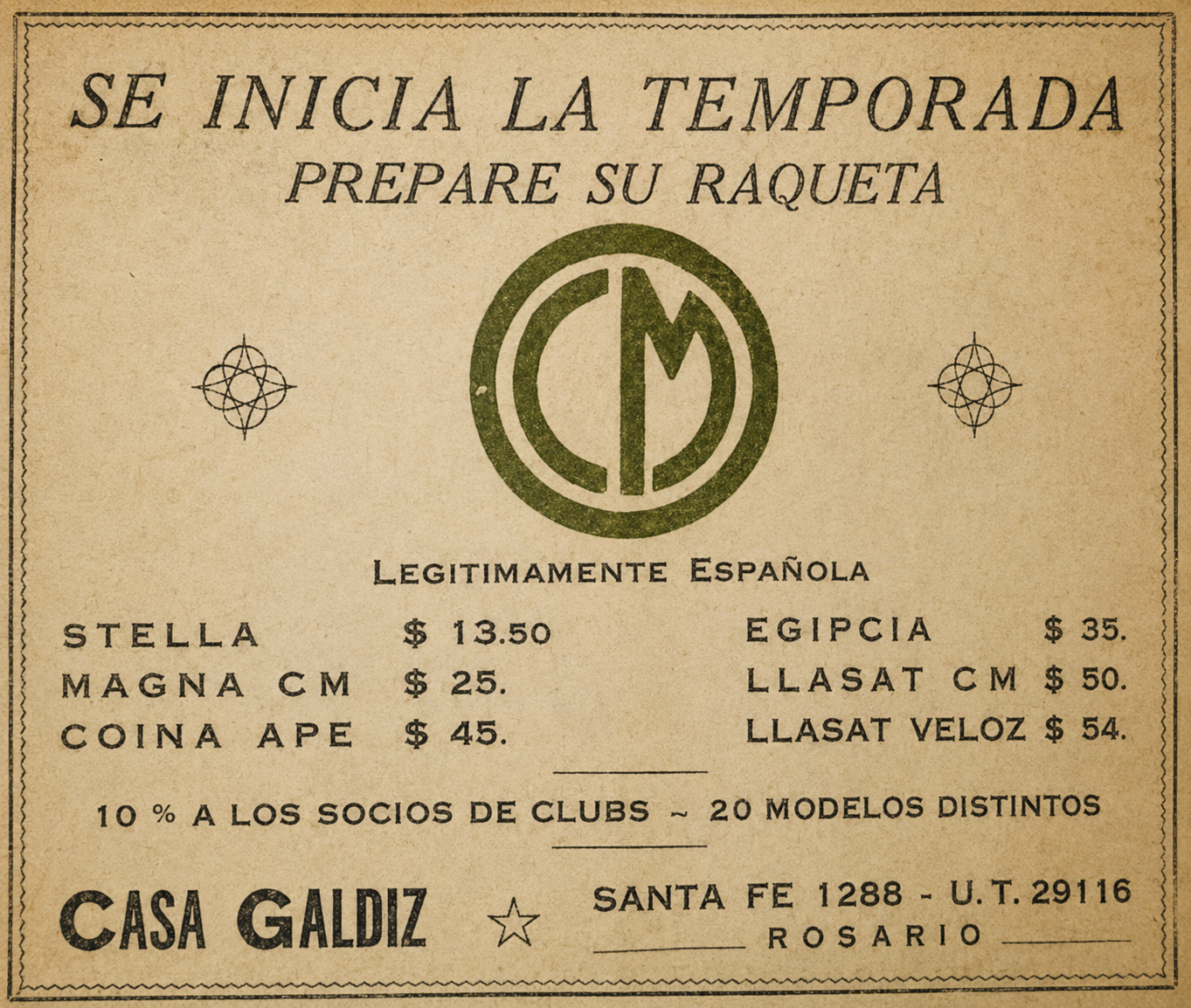
Raquetas CM relocated to Argentina to expand the brand across South America. Various family members continued manufacturing rackets.

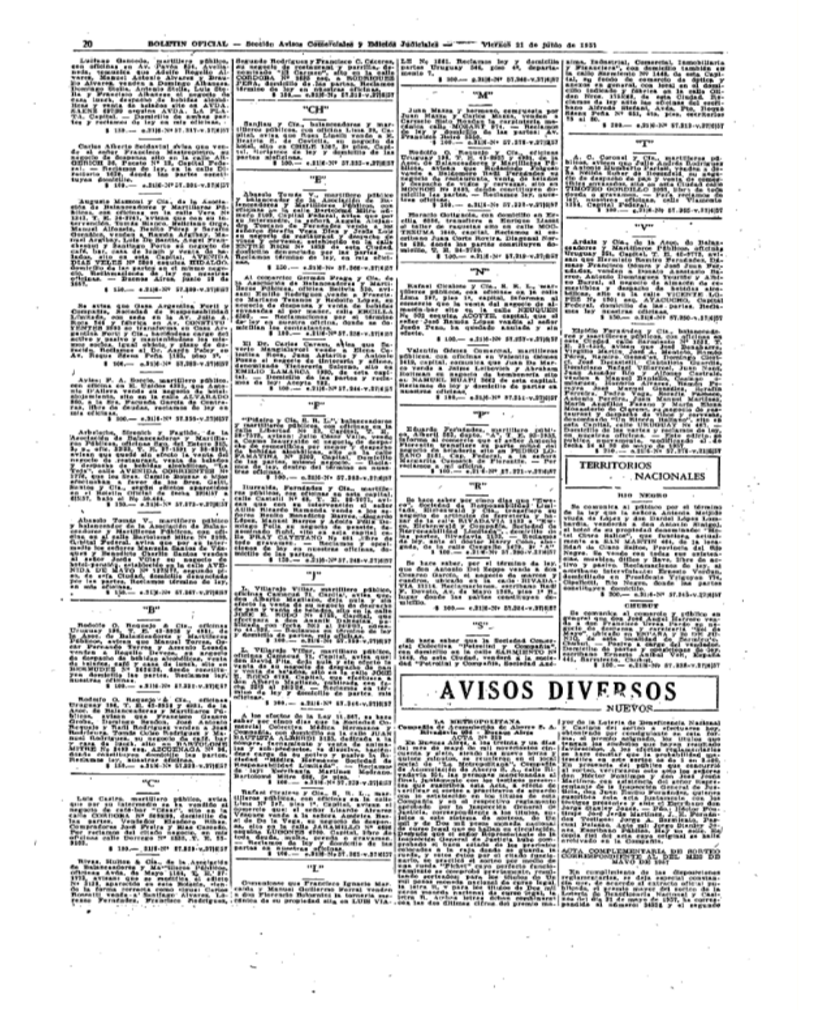
Official Gazette of the Argentine Republic - June 21, 1957 - Page 20

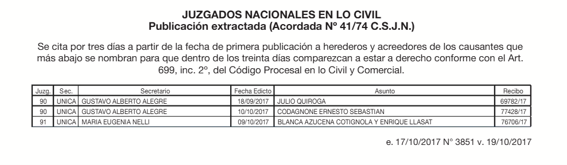
Sucession CM rackets Blanca Azucena Cotignola and Enrique Llasat in Buenos Aires Argentina City

In 1931, the first CM Llasat tennis racket was manufactured in Argentina, a process that originally took a full year to complete. In 1957, Joaquín Llasat Jr. relocated to Córdoba, Argentina, and sold his share of the factory to Enrique Llasat.

Joaquín Llasat established a retail store in Villa Carlos Paz, Córdoba, Argentina. Following this, the company diversified its production and assembly operations: Enrique and his eldest brother, Joaquín, manufactured the racket frames and shipped them to Córdoba. There, the elder Joaquín finalized the production by painting the frames, applying the brand decals, and stringing the rackets.

== Historical models ==
"CM Llasat model". Racket manufactured in Barcelona (Spain) in the 1930s. Belonging to the collection of a private historian and collector. Exhibited on many occasions in wooden racket exhibitions, such as at RC Jolaseta, Biscay (Spain).

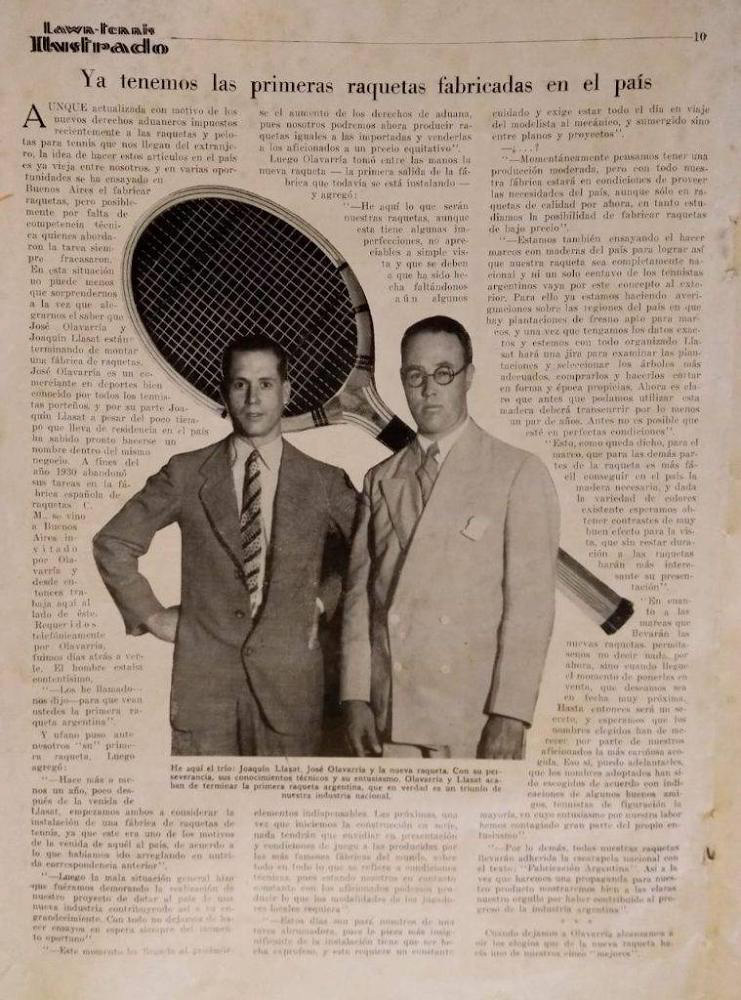
Law Tennis racquets CM model Mayo

In 1931, the Spanish-Argentine factory C.M. (Casa Montaner), owned by the Llasat family, marked a milestone in local manufacturing by producing the "Mayo" model, the first tennis racket to be industrially manufactured in Argentina. To showcase the progress of national industry, the founders formally presented this very first production piece as a gift to General Agustín Pedro Justo, while he was a presidential candidate, months before he took office in early 1932. Following the end of his presidency and his subsequent passing, the physical trace of the racket was lost within official registries and state repositories. Today, its exact whereabouts remain unknown, and the piece is no longer held by the Llasat family or any public collections, making it a highly sought-after historical object for local sports researchers.

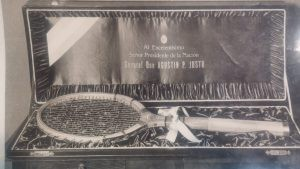
The 'Mayo' model tennis racquet by CM, presented to the Argentine President in 1931

Subsequently, this specific piece, along with its commemorative case and original documentation, was reported missing from the official presidential gift repositories. This led local tennis historians and descendants of the Llasat family to initiate active searches across collector platforms and auction houses in an effort to locate the historic piece or retrieve surviving contemporary models from the same production run.

CM "Copa Paris", classic wooden tennis racquet manufactured by the historic Spanish brand Raquetas C. M. The Copa Paris model stood out technologically for its time due to its design evolution, incorporating a V-shaped neck (open throat design) into its wooden frame. This geometric innovation provided better torque distribution and reduced aerodynamic drag compared to traditional closed-throat frames, foreshadowing the structural traits later standardized by modern aluminum and graphite racquets.

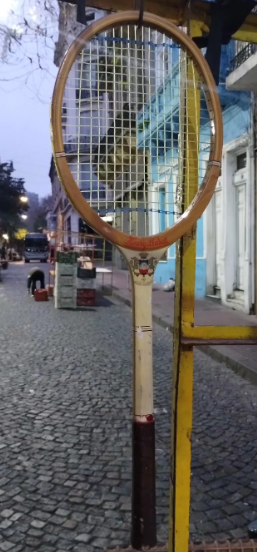
CM Gold Crow

Gold Crown, manufactured in Argentina, ash wood, leather grip.

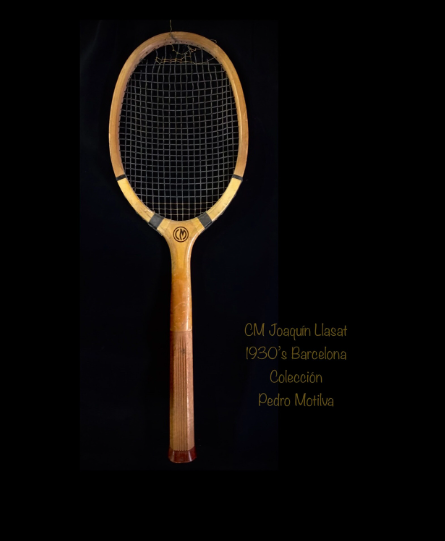
CM Llasat tennis racket, 1930s model

== Racket stringing ==
The leather manufacturing process was deeply traditional and tightly controlled by the family. Whole cowhides were purchased and strategically cut according to the racket model: shorter and wider strips were reserved for the "Gold Crown" and "Super Veloz" lines, while narrower, longer pieces were used for the "Copa Paris" and "CM" models.

Initially, the hides were sent to local shoemakers for tanning and thinning. Upon their return, they underwent a specialized proprietary treatment with cow tallow to ensure flexibility without leaving a sticky residue on the player's hand.

This specific formulation was prepared privately by the family outside the main factory floor to maintain its confidentiality. The finished leather was either used for the factory's own production or rolled and distributed to sporting goods stores. Some players preferred to reverse the grip to utilize the suede-like texture of the underside, and distinct perforation patterns remain a key identifying feature of authentic production pieces.

The use of natural gut strings dates back to the origins of competitive tennis in the late 19th century. Commercially introduced by Babolat in 1875, these strings are manufactured from the serosa layer of bovine intestines. Due to their high elasticity and tension retention, natural gut remained the preferred choice for elite tennis players for over a century.
