= Tennis in Spain =

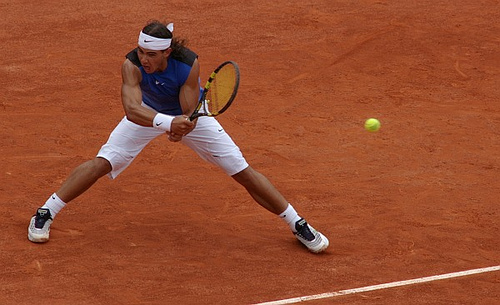
Spanish tennis legend Rafael Nadal playing at Roland-Garros in 2011.

Tennis is highly popular in Spain, and many professional Spanish tennis players have achieved international success. After a slow start throughout the early 20th century, Spanish tennis began its rise to prominence in the 1960s, when Manuel Santana became the first Spaniard to win a major singles title.

Rafael Nadal, who was active throughout the 2000s, 2010s and 2020s, is widely considered the greatest Spanish tennis player of all time: he was ranked world No. 1 for 209 weeks, and won 22 major singles titles. Active player Carlos Alcaraz has also been ranked world No. 1, and has won 7 major singles titles. Other successful Spanish players include Arantxa Sánchez Vicario, Conchita Martínez, Carlos Moyá, Juan Carlos Ferrero, and Garbiñe Muguruza.

Spanish tennis is particularly characterised by success on clay courts, which many Spaniards train on in their youth. Spanish players have won 28 major singles titles on clay at Roland-Garros. Spain has won the Davis Cup six times (2000, 2004, 2008, 2009, 2011 and 2019) and the Billie Jean King Cup (formerly Fed Cup) five times (1991, 1993, 1994, 1995 and 1998).

== Governance ==
The roots of Spanish tennis can be traced to the 19th century, when clubs such as the Real Club de Tenis Barcelona 1899 were founded. In September 1909, the Lawn-Tennis Association of Spain (Spanish: Asociación General de Lawn Tennis, AGLT) was founded to act as the official governing body of Spanish tennis. It became known as the Royal Spanish Tennis Federation (Spanish: Real Federación Española de Tenis, RFET) in 1940.

== Tournaments ==
Tennis tournaments held annually in Spain include the:

- Madrid Open, an ATP Masters 1000 and WTA 1000 event
- Barcelona Open, an ATP 500 event
- Mallorca Open, an ATP 250 and WTA 125 event

== Notable players ==
=== 1960s ===
The first Spanish tennis player to reach a major singles final was Manuel Santana, who defeated Nicola Pietrangeli in five sets to win the French Championships in 1961. Santana went on to claim a further three major singles titles, and was ranked as amateur world No. 1 for the first time in 1965 by Ned Potter. Juan Gisbert Sr. and Andrés Gimeno achieved further success for Spanish men's tennis in the 1960s, finishing as runners-up in the 1968 and 1969 Australian Open singles finals.

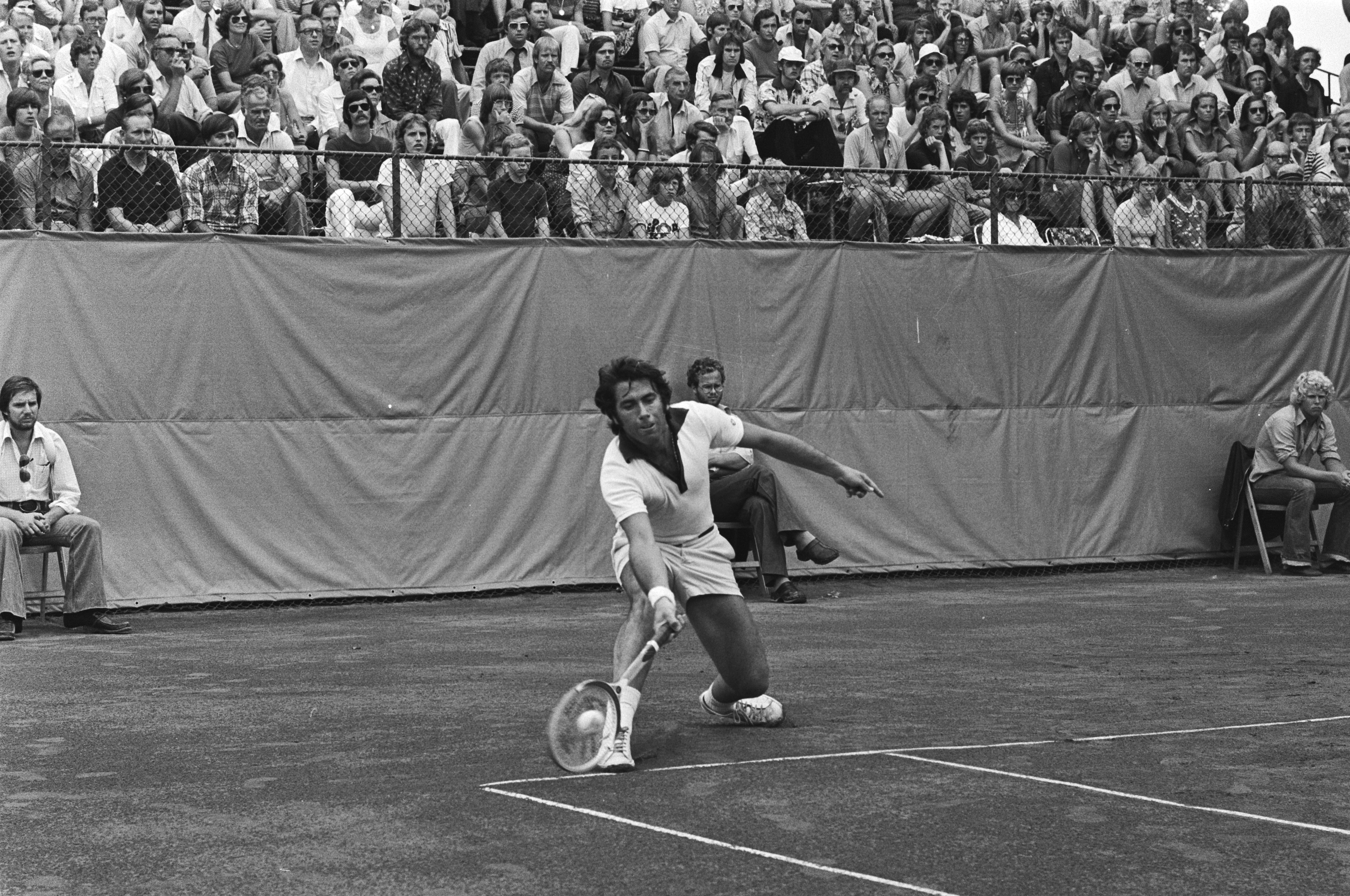
Manuel Santana, the first Spanish tennis player to reach a major singles final.

=== 1970s ===
Spanish men continued to find some success in the 1970s, primarily on clay courts. Gimeno claimed the title at the 1972 French Open. At 34 years, 301 days old, he remained the oldest French Open champion in men's singles until compatriot Rafael Nadal surpassed him in 2022. Manuel Orantes made the final of the 1974 French Open, where he won the first two sets but lost the next three to hand Björn Borg his first major title. Orantes rebounded to win the 1975 US Open, which was played on clay, in straight sets.

=== 1980s ===
The 1980s were comparatively less successful for Spain, with no Spanish men in singles slam finals throughout the decade. However, at the 1989 French Open, Arantxa Sánchez Vicario defeated Steffi Graf, champion at the previous five majors, to become the first Spanish woman to win a major singles title.

=== 1990s ===
The 1990s oversaw an explosion of Spanish talent on both the men's and women's tours. Spanish women claimed three of tour singles majors in 1994: Sánchez Vicario won both the French Open and the US Open, while Conchita Martínez became the first Spanish woman to win Wimbledon. In 1995, Sánchez Vicario became the first Spanish woman to secure the world No. 1 ranking. After a heartbreaking streak of five slam final losses in 1995 and 1996, she picked up her fourth and final major singles title at the 1998 French Open. Spanish women also won the Fed Cup five times, in 1991, 1993, 1994, 1995 and 1998.

Meanwhile, Spanish men's 18-year slam drought ended with Sergi Bruguera's victory at the 1993 French Open, a title he defended in 1994. Carlos Moyá claimed the title at the 1998 French Open, where he defeated countryman Àlex Corretja in the final. Moyá would win 20 ATP Tour titles across his career, and was ranked as the ATP world No. 1 in 1999.

=== 2000s ===
Spanish men dominated the ATP Tour in the 2000s. Spaniard Albert Costa won the 2002 French Open singles title, upsetting countryman Juan Carlos Ferrero in the final. Ferrero rebounded from this loss in 2003, as winner of the French Open, runner-up at the US Open, and world No. 1 for a total of eight weeks. Spanish men also claimed four Davis Cup titles during this decade, in 2000, 2004, 2008, and 2009.

The most significant development in Spanish tennis in the 2000s was the arrival of Rafael Nadal, who won six of his 22 major singles titles in that decade: one Australian Open (2009), one Wimbledon (2008), and four French Opens (2005, 2006, 2007, and 2008). He clinched the world No. 1 ranking for the first time on 18 August 2008, one month after his defeat of Roger Federer at Wimbledon in what is now widely considered one of the greatest matches of all time.

Spanish women's tennis saw slightly less success in this decade, after Martínez reached her third and last slam final at the 2000 French Open.

=== 2010s ===
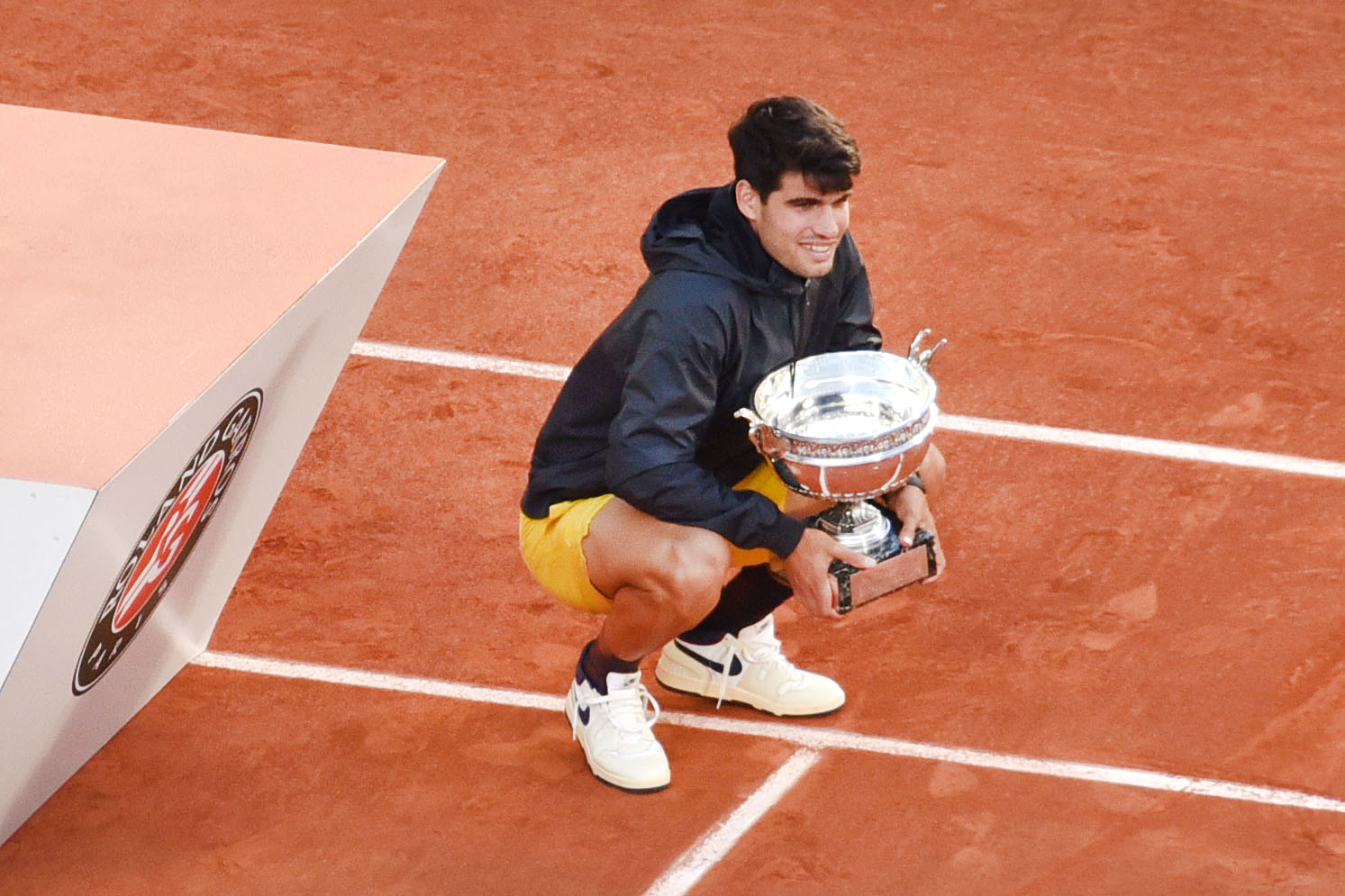
Carlos Alcaraz poses with his first French Open trophy.

Nadal continued to lead Spanish tennis throughout the 2010s, claiming a further thirteen major singles titles: one Wimbledon (2010), four US Opens (2010, 2013, 2017, and 2019), and a stunning eight French Opens (2010, 2011, 2012, 2013, 2014, 2017, 2018, and 2019). Spanish men picked up a further two Davis Cups in 2011 and 2019, led by Nadal and aided by players such as 2013 French Open runner-up David Ferrer.

Garbiñe Muguruza was the most successful Spanish woman of the decade, claiming major singles titles at the French Open in 2016 and Wimbledon in 2017, finishing runner-up at Wimbledon in 2015, and reaching the world No. 1 ranking in 2017.

=== 2020s ===
Nadal secured a final three major titles, at the 2020 and 2022 French Opens, and the 2022 Australian Open, dubbed "the miracle in Melbourne". Plagued by injuries, he retired aged thirty-eight at the Davis Cup in 2024. Spanish men's tennis underwent a seamless transition to its next champion: Carlos Alcaraz, who in 2022 won his first major title at the US Open and became the first teenage ATP world No. 1. Alcaraz won further major singles titles at Wimbledon in 2023 and 2024, the French Open in 2024 and 2025, the US Open in 2025, and the Australian Open in 2026. With his first Australian Open title he became the youngest man in history to complete the Career Grand Slam.

In 2025, Spain returned to the final of the Davis Cup for the first time in six years despite the non-participation of their two top-ranked singles players, Alcaraz and Alejandro Davidovich Fokina. They lost the final to defending champions Italy.

Muguruza reached her fourth and last major final at the Australian Open in 2020. Paula Badosa reached a career-high ranking of world No. 2 in 2022.

== List of Spanish tennis players (Open Era only) ==
Only includes players ranked in the top 50. Bold names indicate currently active players.

Men

| Highest ranking | Name | Birth | Place of birth | Turned pro | Titles |
|---|---|---|---|---|---|
| No. 1 | Rafael Nadal | 1986 | (Balearic Islands) Manacor, Mallorca | 2001 | 92 |
| No. 1 | **Carlos Alcaraz** | 2003 | (Region of Murcia) Murcia | 2018 | 28 |
| No. 1 | Carlos Moyá | 1976 | (Balearic Islands) Palma | 1995 | 20 |
| No. 1 | Juan Carlos Ferrero | 1980 | (Valencian Community) Ontinyent, Valencia | 1998 | 16 |
| No. 2 | Manuel Orantes | 1949 | (Andalusia) Granada | 1968 | 36 |
| No. 2 | Àlex Corretja | 1974 | (Catalonia) Barcelona | 1991 | 17 |
| No. 3 | David Ferrer | 1982 | (Valencian Community) Xàbia, Alicante | 2000 | 27 |
| No. 3 | Sergi Bruguera | 1971 | (Catalonia) Barcelona | 1988 | 14 |
| No. 5 | Tommy Robredo | 1982 | (Catalonia) Hostalric, Girona | 1998 | 12 |
| No. 6 | José Higueras | 1953 | (Andalusia) Diezma | 1973 | 16 |
| No. 6 | Albert Costa | 1975 | (Catalonia) Lleida | 1993 | 12 |
| No. 7 | Emilio Sánchez | 1965 | (Community of Madrid) Madrid | 1984 | 15 |
| No. 7 | Alberto Berasategui | 1973 | (Basque Country (autonomous community)) Bilbao | 1991 | 14 |
| No. 7 | Fernando Verdasco | 1983 | (Community of Madrid) Madrid | 2001 | 7 |
| No. 7 | Juan Aguilera | 1962 | (Catalonia) Barcelona | 1981 | 5 |
| No. 9 | Nicolás Almagro | 1985 | (Region of Murcia) Murcia | 2003 | 13 |
| No. 9 | **Roberto Bautista Agut** | 1988 | (Valencian Community) Castellón de la Plana | 2006 | 12 |
| No. 10 | Félix Mantilla | 1974 | (Catalonia) Barcelona | 1993 | 10 |
| No. 10 | **Pablo Carreño Busta** | 1991 | (Asturias) Gijón | 2009 | 7 |
| No. 10 | Carlos Costa | 1968 | (Catalonia) Barcelona | 1988 | 6 |
| No. 10 | **Rafael Jodar** | 2006 | (Community of Madrid) Madrid | 2025 | 1 |
| No. 12 | Feliciano López | 1981 | (Castilla–La Mancha) Toledo | 1997 | 7 |
| No. 13 | **Alejandro Davidovich Fokina** | 1999 | (Andalusia) Málaga | 2017 | 3 |
| No. 17 | Albert Ramos-Viñolas | 1988 | (Catalonia) Barcelona | 2004 | 4 |
| No. 18 | Francisco Clavet | 1968 | (Community of Madrid) Madrid | 1988 | 8 |
| No. 19 | Marcel Granollers | 1986 | (Catalonia) Barcelona | 2003 | 4 |
| No. 19 | Albert Portas | 1973 | (Catalonia) Barcelona | 1994 | 1 |
| No. 22 | Albert Montañés | 1980 | (Catalonia) Tarragona | 1999 | 6 |
| No. 23 | Jordi Arrese | 1964 | (Catalonia) Barcelona | 1982 | 6 |
| No. 23 | Javier Sánchez | 1968 | (Navarre) Pamplona | 1986 | 4 |
| No. 23 | Guillermo García-López | 1983 | (Castilla–La Mancha) La Roda, Albacete | 2002 | 5 |
| No. 29 | Fernando Vicente | 1977 | (Valencian Community) Benicarló, Castelló | 1996 | 3 |
| No. 30 | Julián Alonso | 1977 | (Catalonia) Canet de Mar, Barcelona | 1996 | 2 |
| No. 31 | Sergio Casal | 1962 | (Catalonia) Barcelona | 1981 | 1 |
| No. 32 | Pablo Andújar | 1986 | (Valencian Community) Valencia | 2005 | 4 |
| No. 32 | Juan Gisbert | 1942 | (Catalonia) Barcelona | 1968 | 1 |
| No. 33 | **Jaume Munar** | 1997 | Barcelona | 2014 | 0 |
| No. 34 | Alberto Martín | 1978 | (Catalonia) Barcelona | 1995 | 3 |
| No. 36 | **Pedro Martínez** | 1997 | (Valencian Community) Alzira, Valencia | 2016 | 1 |
| No. 37 | Bernabé Zapata Miralles | 1997 | (Valencian Community) Valencia | 2015 | 0 |
| No. 39 | **Daniel Mérida** | 2004 | (Community of Madrid) Madrid | 2025 | 1 |
| No. 40 | Tomás Carbonell | 1968 | (Catalonia) Barcelona | 1987 | 2 |
| No. 40 | Galo Blanco | 1976 | (Asturias) Oviedo | 1995 | 1 |
| No. 41 | David Sánchez | 1978 | (Castile and León) Zamora | 1997 | 2 |
| No. 43 | Jordi Burillo | 1972 | (Catalonia) Barcelona | 1991 | 1 |
| No. 44 | Álex Calatrava | 1973 | Cologne, Germany | 1993 | 1 |
| No. 47 | Juan Albert Viloca | 1973 | (Catalonia) Barcelona | 1992 | 0 |
| No. 48 | Óscar Hernández | 1978 | (Catalonia) Barcelona | 1998 | 0 |
| No. 48 | Daniel Gimeno-Traver | 1985 | (Valencian Community) Valencia | 2004 | 0 |
| No. 49 | **Roberto Carballés Baena** | 1993 | (Canary Islands) Tenerife | 2011 | 2 |
| No. 50 | Rubén Ramírez Hidalgo | 1978 | (Valencian Community) Alicante | 1998 | 0 |

Women

| Highest ranking | Name | Birth | Place of birth | Turned pro | Titles |
|---|---|---|---|---|---|
| No. 1 | Arantxa Sánchez Vicario | 1971 | (Catalonia) Barcelona | 1985 | 29 |
| No. 1 | Garbiñe Muguruza | 1993 | Guatire, Venezuela | 2012 | 10 |
| No. 2 | Conchita Martínez | 1972 | (Aragon) Monzón, Huesca | 1988 | 33 |
| No. 2 | **Paula Badosa** | 1997 | New York, United States | 2015 | 4 |
| No. 6 | Carla Suárez Navarro | 1988 | (Canary Islands) Las Palmas | 2003 | 2 |
| No. 16 | Anabel Medina Garrigues | 1982 | (Valencian Community) Valencia | 1998 | 11 |
| No. 19 | María José Martínez Sánchez | 1982 | (Region of Murcia) Yecla, Murcia | 1998 | 5 |
| No. 19 | Magüi Serna | 1979 | (Canary Islands) Las Palmas | 1996 | 3 |
| No. 22 | Ángeles Montolio | 1975 | (Catalonia) Barcelona | 1990 | 3 |
| No. 27 | Cristina Torrens Valero | 1974 | (Navarre) Pamplona | 1992 | 2 |
| No. 27 | Gala León García | 1973 | (Community of Madrid) Madrid | 1990 | 1 |
| No. 28 | Virginia Ruano Pascual | 1973 | (Community of Madrid) Madrid | 1992 | 3 |
| No. 30 | **Cristina Bucșa** | 1998 | Chișinău, Moldova | 2016 | 1 |
| No. 32 | **Sara Sorribes Tormo** | 1996 | (Valencian Community) Castellón de la Plana | 2012 | 2 |
| No. 33 | María Sánchez Lorenzo | 1977 | (Castile and León) Salamanca | 1994 | 1 |
| No. 35 | Nuria Llagostera Vives | 1980 | (Balearic Islands) Mallorca | 1996 | 2 |
| No. 40 | Lourdes Domínguez Lino | 1981 | (Galicia (Spain)) Pontevedra | 1996 | 2 |
| No. 40 | **Jessica Bouzas Maneiro** | 2002 | (Galicia (Spain)) Pontevedra | 2018 | 1 |
| No. 45 | **Nuria Párrizas Díaz** | 1991 | (Andalusia) Granada | 2008 | 0 |
| No. 46 | Arantxa Parra Santonja | 1982 | (Catalonia) Barcelona | 2000 | 0 |
| No. 47 | María Teresa Torró Flor | 1992 | (Valencian Community) Villena | 2007 | 1 |
| No. 47 | Marta Marrero | 1983 | (Canary Islands) Las Palmas | 1998 | 0 |

== Grand Slam performances of Spanish tennis players ==
Only includes players who have reached at least a Grand Slam quarterfinal

| Player | Australian Open | Roland Garros | Wimbledon | US Open | Total titles |
|---|---|---|---|---|---|
| Rafael Nadal | Winner (2) | Winner (14) | Winner (2) | Winner (4) | 22 |
| Carlos Alcaraz | Winner | Winner (2) | Winner (2) | Winner (2) | 7 |
| Manuel Santana | DNP | Winner (2) | Winner | Winner | 4 |
| Arantxa Sánchez Vicario | Runner up | Winner (3) | Runner up | Winner | 4 |
| Garbiñe Muguruza | Runner Up | Winner | Winner | 4R | 2 |
| Sergi Bruguera | 4R | Winner (2) | 4R | 4R | 2 |
| Conchita Martínez | Runner up | Runner up | Winner | SF | 1 |
| Juan Carlos Ferrero | SF | Winner | QF | Runner up | 1 |
| Manuel Orantes | QF | Runner up | SF | Winner | 1 |
| Andrés Gimeno | Runner up | Winner | SF | 4R | 1 |
| Carlos Moyá | Runner up | Winner | 4R | SF | 1 |
| Albert Costa | QF | Winner | 2R | 4R | 1 |
| David Ferrer | SF | Runner up | QF | SF | 0 |
| Manuel Alonso | DNP | SF | Runner up | QF | 0 |
| Lili Álvarez | DNP | SF | Runner up | DNP | 0 |
| Àlex Corretja | 3R | Runner up | 2R | QF | 0 |
| Alberto Berasategui | QF | Runner up | 1R | 2R | 0 |
| Fernando Verdasco | SF | 4R | QF | QF | 0 |
| Paula Badosa | SF | QF | 4R | QF | 0 |
| Roberto Bautista Agut | QF | 4R | SF | 4R | 0 |
| Félix Mantilla | QF | SF | 3R | 4R | 0 |
| Pablo Carreño Busta | 4R | QF | 1R | SF | 0 |
| José Higueras | DNP | SF | 2R | 4R | 0 |
| Tommy Robredo | QF | QF | 4R | QF | 0 |
| Carla Suárez Navarro | QF | QF | 4R | QF | 0 |
| Feliciano López | 4R | 4R | QF | QF | 0 |
| Emilio Sánchez | 4R | QF | 4R | QF | 0 |
| Nicolás Almagro | QF | QF | 3R | 4R | 0 |
| Virginia Ruano Pascual | QF | QF | 4R | 3R | 0 |
| Alejandro Davidovich Fokina | 4R | QF | 3R | 4R | 0 |
| Javier Sánchez | 3R | 4R | 2R | QF | 0 |
| Marta Marrero | 4R | QF | 2R | 1R | 0 |
| Albert Ramos Viñolas | 3R | QF | 3R | 2R | 0 |

== Spanish tennis achievements timeline ==
| Year | Grand Slam singles titles | Total singles titles (ATP + WTA) | Team competitions | Olympics | Special achievements |
|---|---|---|---|---|---|
| 1988 | 0 | 4 (2 ATP + 2 WTA) | - | 1 silver | |
| 1989 | 1 | 8 (3 ATP + 5 WTA) | - | - | Arantxa Sánchez Vicario becomes the first Spanish woman to win a Grand Slam title |
| 1990 | 0 | 12 (7 ATP + 5 WTA) | Hopman Cup champions (1/4) | - | |
| 1991 | 0 | 12 (8 ATP + 4 WTA) | Fed Cup champions (1/5) | - | |
| 1992 | 0 | 11 (8 ATP + 3 WTA) | - | 2 silvers, 1 bronze | |
| 1993 | 1 | 19 (10 ATP + 9 WTA) | Fed Cup champions (2/5) | - | |
| 1994 | 4 | 26 (14 ATP + 12 WTA) | Fed Cup champions (3/5) | - | Sergi Bruguera and Alberto Berasategui play first all-Spanish Grand Slam final Conchita Martínez becomes the first Spanish woman to win Wimbledon |
| 1995 | 0 | 12 (4 ATP + 8 WTA) | Fed Cup champions (4/5) | - | Arantxa Sánchez Vicario reaches No. 1 in both singles and doubles world rankings |
| 1996 | 0 | 16 (12 ATP + 4 WTA) | | 2 silvers, 1 bronze | |
| 1997 | 0 | 16 (15 ATP + 1 WTA) | - | - | |
| 1998 | 2 | 17 (12 ATP + 5 WTA) | Fed Cup champions (5/5) | | Àlex Corretja wins the year-end ATP Tour World Championships |
| 1999 | 0 | 13 (9 ATP + 4 WTA) | | - | Carlos Moyá reaches No. 1 |
| 2000 | 0 | 11 (9 ATP + 2 WTA) | Davis Cup champions (1/6) | 1 bronze | |
| 2001 | 0 | 18 (12 ATP + 6 WTA) | | - | |
| 2002 | 1 | 12 (10 ATP + 2 WTA) | Hopman Cup champions (2/4) | - | |
| 2003 | 1 | 13 (10 ATP + 3 WTA) | | - | Juan Carlos Ferrero reaches No. 1 |
| 2004 | 0 | 9 (8 ATP + 1 WTA) | Davis Cup champions (2/6) | 1 silver | |
| 2005 | 1 | 16 (12 ATP + 4 WTA) | | - | |
| 2006 | 1 | 13 (10 ATP + 3 WTA) | | - | |
| 2007 | 1 | 13 (12 ATP + 1 WTA) | | - | |
| 2008 | 2 | 18 (16 ATP + 2 WTA) | Davis Cup champions (3/6) | 1 gold, 1 silver | Rafael Nadal wins two majors including a 4th French Open title (the most by any Spaniard), an Olympic singles gold medal, and ends the year as No. 1 for the first time |
| 2009 | 1 | 16 (13 ATP + 3 WTA) | Davis Cup champions (4/6) | - | Rafael Nadal becomes the first Spaniard to win the Australian Open |
| 2010 | 3 | 20 (19 ATP + 1 WTA) | Hopman Cup champions (3/4) | - | Rafael Nadal becomes the first man to win majors on all three surfaces in one season, the only Spaniard to complete the Career Golden Slam (second overall), and ends the year as No. 1 |
| 2011 | 1 | 18 (13 ATP + 5 WTA) | Davis Cup champions (5/6) | - | |
| 2012 | 1 | 15 (14 ATP + 1 WTA) | | | |
| 2013 | 2 | 17 (17 ATP + 0 WTA) | Hopman Cup champions (4/4) | - | Rafael Nadal wins two majors and ends the year as No. 1 |
| 2014 | 1 | 14 (11 ATP + 3 WTA) | | - | |
| 2015 | 0 | 11 (10 ATP + 1 WTA) | | - | |
| 2016 | 1 | 13 (10 ATP + 3 WTA) | | 1 gold | Garbiñe Muguruza wins a career-first Grand Slam title |
| 2017 | 3 | 13 (11 ATP + 2 WTA) | | - | Rafael Nadal wins two majors and ends the year as No. 1 Nadal and Garbiñe Muguruza top both the ATP and WTA rankings simultaneously |
| 2018 | 1 | 10 (9 ATP + 1 WTA) | | - | |
| 2019 | 2 | 9 (8 ATP + 1 WTA) | Davis Cup champions (6/6) | - | |
| 2020 | 1 | 2 (2 ATP + 0 WTA) | | - | Rafael Nadal wins a milestone 20th Grand Slam singles title, reaches 1000 career match wins (the most by any Spaniard), and becomes the first man to be ranked No. 1 in three different decades |
| 2021 | 0 | 12 (6 ATP + 6 WTA) | | 1 bronze | Paula Badosa becomes the first Spanish woman to win the Indian Wells Masters; Garbiñe Muguruza becomes the first Spanish woman to win the WTA Finals |
| 2022 | 3 | 15 (14 ATP + 1 WTA) | | - | Rafael Nadal becomes the first man to win a 21st and 22nd Grand Slam singles title. Nadal becomes the fourth man to achieve a double Career Grand Slam in singles and the first to win multiple majors in three different decades Carlos Alcaraz wins a career-first Grand Slam title, and becomes the youngest world No. 1 and year-end No. 1 in ATP rankings history |
| 2023 | 1 | 8 (7 ATP + 1 WTA) | | | |
| 2024 | 2 | 6 (5 ATP + 1 WTA) | | 1 silver | Carlos Alcaraz becomes the youngest man to win the Channel Slam, the youngest man to win majors on all three surfaces, and the youngest finalist in Olympic men's singles |
| 2025 | 2 | 8 (8 ATP + 0 WTA) | | | Carlos Alcaraz wins two majors for a second consecutive year, becomes the youngest man to win multiple majors on all three surfaces and ends the year ranked No. 1 |
| 2026 | 1 | 3 (2 ATP + 1 WTA) | | | Carlos Alcaraz wins the Australian Open for the first time, and becomes the youngest man in history to complete the Career Grand Slam. |
