= Tennis performance timeline comparison (men) =

Grand Slam and Olympic tournament

This article compares the Grand Slam and Olympic tournament results of male tennis players who reached at least one Grand Slam tournament final or won an Olympic medal. The Grand Slam tournaments are the Australian Open, the French Open, Wimbledon, and the U.S. Open. All data is from the International Tennis Federation men's circuit database.

== Legend ==
Key
**W**	F	SF	QF	#R	RR	Q#	P#	DNQ	A	Z#	PO	**G**	S	B	NMS	NTI	P	NH

(W) winner; (F) finalist; (SF) semifinalist; (QF) quarterfinalist; (#R) rounds 4, 3, 2, 1; (RR) round-robin stage; (Q#) qualification round; (P#) preliminary round; (DNQ) did not qualify; (A) absent; (Z#) Davis/Fed Cup Zonal Group (with number indication) or (PO) play-off; (G) gold, (S) silver or (B) bronze Olympic/Paralympic medal; (NMS) not a Masters tournament; (NTI) not a Tier I tournament; (P) postponed; (NH) not held; (SR) strike rate (events won / competed); (W–L) win–loss record.
To avoid confusion and double counting, these charts are updated at the conclusion of a tournament or when the player's participation has ended.

Less frequent qualifiers are explained in the notes below the table.

Athletes in bold are considered to be still in championship tennis.

== 1925–1930 ==
(1925 the ILTF establishes the modern 4 majors)

== 1967–1972 ==
Winner of most titles: Rod Laver, with 5.

Player	1967				1968				1969				1970				1971				1972			
Player	AUS	FRA	WIM	USA	AUS	FRA	WIM	USA	AUS	FRA	WIM	USA	AUS	FRA	WIM	USA	AUS	FRA	WIM	USA	AUS	FRA	WIM	USA
(Australia) Mal Anderson	A	A	A	A	A	A	A	3R	3R	A	3R	A	1R	A	A	A	2R	A	A	A	F	A	A	2R
(United States) Arthur Ashe	F	A	A	A	A	A	SF	**W**	A	4R	SF	SF	**W**	QF	4R	QF	F	4R	3R	SF	A	4R	A	F
(Australia) Bill Bowrey	QF	2R	3R	4R	**W**	A	2R	A	QF	2R	3R	3R	4R	A	2R	3R	2R	3R	1R	3R	A	A	A	A
(West Germany) Wilhelm Bungert	A	A	F	A	A	1R	A	A	A	A	A	A	A	A	A	2R	A	A	A	A	A	1R	3R	
(United States) Jimmy Connors													A	A	A	1R	A	A	1R	2R	A	3R	QF	1R
(Australia) Dick Crealy	3R	1R	3R	A	QF	3R	2R	A	3R	2R	3R	2R	F	4R	2R	1R	3R	2R	1R	A	QF	2R	2R	A
(Australia) Phil Dent	1R	A	A	A	QF	A	1R	A	2R	2R	3R	1R	3R	3R	2R	A	2R	1R	2R	2R	A	A	A	1R
(South Africa) Cliff Drysdale	A	QF	4R	2R	A	A	3R	QF	A	1R	QF	1R	A	A	3R	2R	QF	A	1R	A	A	A	A	4R
(Australia) Roy Emerson	**W**	**W**	4R	QF	A	QF	4R	4R	4R	4R	4R	QF	A	A	QF	4R	QF	A	4R	A	A	A	A	1R
(Socialist Federal Republic of Yugoslavia) Željko Franulović	A	1R	1R	A	A	4R	A	1R	A	QF	2R	1R	A	F	3R	A	A	SF	2R	2R	A	2R	A	A
(Spain) Andrés Gimeno	A	A	A	A	A	SF	3R	1R	F	QF	4R	4R	A	A	SF	1R	3R	A	1R	A	A	**W**	2R	4R
(Spain) Juan Gisbert	A	A	A	A	F	1R	A	A	A	A	A	A	A	2R	A	A	A	1R	A	A	A	3R	2R	A
(United States) Brian Gottfried																1R	A	A	A	1R	A	3R	2R	1R
(United States) Clark Graebner	A	A	4R	F	A	A	SF	SF	A	A	QF	2R	A	A	QF	4R	A	A	3R	QF	A	4R	2R	2R
(Hungary) István Gulyás	A	SF	1R	A	A	4R	1R	A	A	4R	1R	A	A	2R	1R	A	A	QF	1R	A	A	2R	1R	A
(Czechoslovakia) Jan Kodeš	A	4R	1R	A	A	1R	1R	A	A	4R	2R	2R	A	**W**	1R	A	A	**W**	1R	F	A	QF	SF	2R
(Australia) Rod Laver	A	A	A	A	A	F	**W**	4R	**W**	**W**	**W**	**W**	A	A	4R	4R	4R	A	QF	A	A	A	A	4R
(Soviet Union) Alex Metreveli	A	3R	1R	A	A	1R	4R	A	A	1R	2R	A	A	4R	2R	3R	A	2R	4R	A	SF	SF	QF	A
(Romania) Ilie Năstase	A	3R	1R	A	A	2R	A	A	A	1R	3R	4R	A	QF	4R	A	A	F	2R	3R	A	2R	F	**W**
(Australia) John Newcombe	SF	4R	**W**	**W**	A	A	4R	QF	QF	QF	F	SF	QF	A	**W**	SF	4R	A	**W**	2R	QF	A	A	3R
(Netherlands) Tom Okker	A	QF	2R	A	A	A	QF	F	2R	SF	QF	1R	QF	A	2R	4R	SF	A	4R	SF	A	A	A	3R
(Spain) Manuel Orantes					QF	1R	1R	A	A	3R	1R	2R	A	4R	3R	A	A	1R	1R	QF	A	SF	SF	3R
(Italy) Adriano Panatta									2R	1R	A	A	A	4R	1R	A	A	3R	3R	A	A	QF	3R	1R
(New Zealand) Onny Parun	A	A	A	A	A	1R	3R	A	A	1R	2R	1R	A	1R	1R	2R	A	1R	QF	3R	A	3R	QF	2R
(Socialist Federal Republic of Yugoslavia) Nikola Pilić	A	SF	SF	3R	A	A	1R	4R	A	2R	1R	3R	4R	A	2R	4R	3R	1R	3R	4R	A	A	A	3R
(France) Patrick Proisy						2R	A	A	A	1R	A	1R	A	1R	1R	A	A	QF	2R	1R	3R	F	2R	2R
(United States) Dennis Ralston	A	A	A	A	A	A	QF	QF	A	3R	4R	4R	SF	A	4R	QF	3R	A	3R	2R	A	A	A	A
(Australia) Tony Roche	SF	F	2R	A	A	A	F	4R	SF	SF	SF	F	QF	A	QF	F	4R	A	AR	A	A	A	A	A
(Australia) Ken Rosewall	A	A	A	A	A	**W**	4R	SF	4R	F	3R	QF	A	A	F	**W**	**W**	A	SF	A	**W**	A	A	2R
(Spain) Manuel Santana	A	A	1R	A	A	A	3R	A	A	4R	A	4R	A	4R	A	4R								
(United States) Stan Smith	A	A	3R	3R	A	A	2R	2R	A	4R	4R	2R	4R	1R	4R	QF	A	QF	F	**W**	A	QF	**W**	QF
(United States) Harold Solomon																					A	QF	1R	2R
(Australia) Fred Stolle	A	A	A	A	A	2R	4R	2R	QF	QF	4R	QF	A	A	1R	3R	3R	A	4R	A	A	A	A	QF
(Argentina) Guillermo Vilas													A	A	1R	A	A	A	A	A	A	3R	1R	2R
	AUS	FRA	WIM	USA	AUS	FRA	WIM	USA	AUS	FRA	WIM	USA	AUS	FRA	WIM	USA	AUS	FRA	WIM	USA	AUS	FRA	WIM	USA
Player	1967				1968				1969				1970				1971				1972			

== 1973–1978 ==
Winner of most titles: Björn Borg, with 6.

Player	1973				1974				1975				1976				1977					1978			
Player	AUS	FRA	WIM	USA	AUS	FRA	WIM	USA	AUS	FRA	WIM	USA	AUS	FRA	WIM	USA	AUS^{J}	FRA	WIM	USA	AUS^{D}	FRA	WIM	USA	AUS
(United States) Arthur Ashe	A	4R	A	3R	A	4R	3R	QF	A	A	**W**	4R	A	4R	4R	2R	QF	A	A	A	A	4R	1R	4R	SF
(Sweden) Björn Borg	A	4R	QF	4R	3R	**W**	3R	2R	A	**W**	QF	SF	A	QF	**W**	F	A	A	**W**	4R	A	**W**	**W**	F	A
(United States) Jimmy Connors	A	1R	QF	QF	**W**	A	**W**	**W**	F	A	F	F	A	A	QF	**W**	A	A	F	F	A	A	F	**W**	A
(Australia) Dick Crealy	1R	1R	A	2R	3R	2R	3R	1R	SF	1R	2R	A	QF	1R	1R	1R	3R	1R	1R	A	2R	1R	1R	2R	2R
(Australia) Phil Dent	1R	3R	A	3R	F	A	2R	A	1R	1R	4R	2R	2R	A	4R	1R	QF	SF	QF	2R	2R	1R	3R	1R	2R
(Australia) Mark Edmondson									1R	A	2R	A	**W**	1R	3R	1R	QF	2R	2R	3R	A	1R	2R	1R	2R
(United States) Vitas Gerulaitis				1R	A	A	1R	2R	A	A	1R	2R	A	A	QF	4R	A	A	SF	4R	**W**	A	SF	SF	A
(United States) Brian Gottfried	A	2R	A	3R	A	2R	2R	2R	A	4R	3R	2R	A	4R	4R	4R	A	F	2R	QF	A	3R	QF	QF	A
(Czechoslovakia) Jan Kodeš	A	QF	**W**	F	A	4R	QF	4R	A	4R	2R	4R	A	3R	A	QF	A	4R	1R	3R	A	3R	1R	A	A
(South Africa) Johan Kriek																						1R	2R	QF	A
(Australia) Rod Laver	A	A	A	3R	A	A	A	A	A	A	A	4R	A	A	A	A	A	A	2R						
(New Zealand) Chris Lewis													2R	A	2R	A	1R	3R	1R	A	3R	2R	1R	1R	A
(United Kingdom) John Lloyd	A	2R	3R	2R	2R	1R	1R	2R	A	2R	1R	2R	2R	1R	1R	3R	A	1R	2R	2R	F	2R	1R	3R	A
(Australia) John Marks									A	A	A	A	1R	A	1R	A	1R	A	1R	1R	1R	2R	2R	A	F
(United States) John McEnroe									A	A	A	A	A	A	A	A	A	2R	SF	4R	A	A	1R	SF	A
(Soviet Union) Alex Metreveli	QF	2R	F	A	A	2R	QF	QF	QF	2R	4R	1R	A	A	3R	2R									
(Romania) Ilie Năstase	A	**W**	4R	2R	A	QF	4R	3R	A	3R	2R	QF	A	A	F	SF	A	QF	QF	2R	A	A	QF	A	A
(Australia) John Newcombe	**W**	1R	A	**W**	QF	A	QF	SF	**W**	A	A	A	F	1R	3R	A	A	A	A	A	QF	A	4R	A	A
(France) Yannick Noah																		1R	A	A	A	3R	2R	1R	1R
(Netherlands) Tom Okker	A	QF	A	4R	A	A	4R	4R	A	A	QF	2R	A	A	3R	3R	A	A	4R	A	A	1R	SF	1R	A
(Spain) Manuel Orantes	A	2R	A	3R	A	F	4R	2R	A	1R	A	**W**	A	QF	A	QF	A	A	A	QF	A	QF	A	1R	A
(Italy) Adriano Panatta	A	SF	A	3R	A	2R	3R	A	A	SF	3R	A	A	**W**	3R	2R	A	QF	2R	3R	A	2R	A	4R	A
(New Zealand) Onny Parun	F	3R	1R	QF	3R	4R	1R	2R	A	QF	3R	3R	A	A	4R	1R	A	1R	3R	3R	1R	1R	1R	A	A
(Paraguay) Víctor Pecci						1R	A	A	A	A	2R	1R	A	2R	2R	2R	A	1R	A	1R	A	3R	1R	2R	A
(Socialist Federal Republic of Yugoslavia) Nikola Pilić	A	F	A	QF	A	A	3R	A	A	3R	1R	A	A	2R	4R	A	A	1R	3R	A	A	2R			
(France) Patrick Proisy	SF	1R	A	1R	A	3R	2R	A	A	3R	1R	1R	A	2R	1R	1R	A	2R	A	2R	A	2R	A	A	A
(Australia) Tony Roche	A	A	A	A	2R	A	3R	3R	SF	A	SF	2R	QF	A	4R	A	3R	A	A	A	1R	A	1R	A	QF
(Australia) Ken Rosewall	2R	A	A	SF	A	A	F	F	A	A	4R	A	SF	A	A	A	SF	A	A	3R	QF	A	A	A	4R
(United States) Stan Smith	A	4R	A	SF	A	1R	SF	QF	A	4R	1R	1R	3R	A	4R	4R	3R	4R	4R	2R	A	3R	1R	3R	A
(United States) Harold Solomon	A	3R	A	1R	A	SF	1R	A	A	QF	A	4R	A	F	A	1R	A	4R	1R	SF	A	3R	A	4R	A
(United States) Roscoe Tanner				3R	A	1R	4R	SF	A	3R	SF	3R	A	A	SF	4R	**W**	A	1R	4R	1R	4R	4R	4R	A
(United States) Brian Teacher	A	A	A	2R	A	A	A	3R	A	A	A	1R	A	A	2R	1R	1R	2R	1R	2R	1R	3R	2R	4R	A
(Argentina) Guillermo Vilas	A	3R	A	1R	A	3R	3R	4R	A	F	QF	SF	A	QF	QF	SF	F	**W**	3R	**W**	A	F	3R	4R	**W**
(Australia) Kim Warwick	1R	1R	A	A	2R	A	3R	1R	QF	A	3R	2R	3R	1R	3R	3R	1R	2R	4R	1R	1R	1R	2R	1R	3R
	AUS	FRA	WIM	USA	AUS	FRA	WIM	USA	AUS	FRA	WIM	USA	AUS	FRA	WIM	USA	AUS^{J}	FRA	WIM	USA	AUS^{D}	FRA	WIM	USA	AUS
Player	1973				1974				1975				1976				1977					1978			

== 1979–1984 ==
Winner of most titles: John McEnroe, with 7.

Player	1979				1980				1981				1982				1983				1984			
Player	FRA	WIM	USA	AUS	FRA	WIM	USA	AUS	FRA	WIM	USA	AUS	FRA	WIM	USA	AUS	FRA	WIM	USA	AUS	FRA	WIM	USA	AUS
(United States) Arthur Ashe	A	3R	1R	A																				
(West Germany) Boris Becker																					A	3R	A	QF
(Sweden) Björn Borg	**W**	**W**	QF	A	**W**	**W**	F	A	**W**	F	F	A	A	A	A	A								
(Australia) Pat Cash												2R	A	A	1R	QF	1R	4R	3R	4R	1R	SF	SF	QF
(United States) Jimmy Connors	SF	SF	SF	A	SF	SF	SF	A	QF	SF	SF	A	QF	**W**	**W**	A	QF	4R	**W**	A	SF	F	SF	A
(South Africa) Kevin Curren	A	A	2R	A	A	4R	A	3R	A	2R	4R	2R	A	3R	1R	A	A	SF	A	A	A	4R	2R	F
(Australia) Phil Dent	1R	2R	1R	QF	A	4R	A	4R	A	1R	1R	4R	A	A	1R	4R	A	A	A	2R				
(United States) Steve Denton									A	1R	1R	F	1R	4R	4R	F	A	1R	3R	3R	1R	1R	2R	1R
(Sweden) Stefan Edberg																	2R	A	2R	1R	QF	2R	2R	2R
(Australia) Mark Edmondson	1R	1R	1R	QF	1R	1R	A	3R	1R	2R	3R	SF	A	SF	2R	1R	A	3R	A	3R	A	3R	1R	2R
(United States) Vitas Gerulaitis	SF	1R	F	A	F	4R	2R	2R	1R	4R	SF	A	QF	QF	1R	A	1R	2R	3R	2R	2R	4R	4R	2R
(Ecuador) Andrés Gómez		A	2R	A	2R	1R	2R	A	2R	A	3R	A	4R	1R	A	A	4R	A	4R	A	QF	QF	QF	A
(United States) Brian Gottfried	3R	3R	4R	A	4R	SF	4R	4R	3R	2R	4R	A	2R	2R	2R	A	4R	4R	2R	A	4R	1R	2R	A
(South Africa) / (United States) Johan Kriek	1R	3R	QF	A	A	3R	SF	A	A	QF	3R	**W**	A	QF	3R	**W**	A	3R	4R	QF	A	4R	3R	SF
(France) Henri Leconte					1R	A	A	A	1R	2R	A	A	1R	1R	1R	A	2R	2R	A	A	2R	A	3R	A
(Czechoslovakia) Ivan Lendl	4R	1R	2R	A	3R	3R	QF	2R	F	1R	4R	A	4R	A	F	A	QF	SF	F	F	**W**	SF	F	4R
(New Zealand) Chris Lewis	2R	A	1R	1R	2R	2R	A	1R	2R	2R	2R	3R	2R	3R	3R	3R	1R	F	2R	3R	1R	2R	1R	2R
(United Kingdom) John Lloyd	2R	1R	2R	A	A	1R	A	A	A	2R	1R	A	3R	1R	A	1R	1R	1R	4R	4R	2R	3R	QF	2R
(United States) John McEnroe	A	4R	**W**	A	3R	F	**W**	A	QF	**W**	**W**	A	A	F	SF	A	QF	**W**	4R	SF	F	**W**	**W**	A
(Czechoslovakia) Miloslav Mečíř																	1R	A	A	A	2R	1R	2R	A
(Romania) Ilie Năstase	1R	A	2R	A	A	3R	2R	A	3R	1R	1R	1R	2R	1R	4R	A	3R	A	1R	A	1R	A	1R	A
(France) Yannick Noah	2R	3R	4R	A	2R	A	4R	1R	QF	1R	4R	A	QF	A	4R	A	**W**	A	QF	A	QF	A	A	A
(Netherlands) Tom Okker	A	QF	1R	A	A	3R	1R	A	A	1R														
(Spain) Manuel Orantes	4R	4R	A	A	4R	A	A	A	1R	A	A	A	A	A	A	A	2R	A						
(Italy) Adriano Panatta	3R	QF	1R	A	1R	3R	A	A	2R	A	3R	A	2R	A										
(New Zealand) Onny Parun	A	2R	1R	A	1R	4R	1R	1R	1R	A	A	1R	1R	A										
(Paraguay) Víctor Pecci	F	3R	3R	A	2R	3R	2R	2R	SF	1R	A	A	2R	A	A	1R	2R	A	A	A	1R			
(United States) John Sadri	A	3R	2R	F	1R	2R	2R	QF	A	3R	1R	1R	A	1R	1R	4R	A	1R	2R	2R	A	QF	1R	4R
(United States) Stan Smith	3R	3R	3R	A	A	3R	1R	A	A	4R	2R	A	A	2R	2R	A	A	1R	1R	A	A	A	A	A
(United States) Harold Solomon	4R	A	4R	A	SF	A	4R	A	1R	A	3R	A	2R	A	3R	A	A	A	1R	A	3R	A	A	A
(United States) Roscoe Tanner	A	F	SF	A	A	QF	QF	A	A	2R	QF	2R	A	4R	2R	A	A	QF	3R	3R	A	A	1R	
(United States) Brian Teacher	2R	4R	1R	A	A	3R	4R	**W**	A	2R	2R	A	–	QF	2R	QF	A	3R	1R	3R	A	1R	1R	A
(Argentina) Guillermo Vilas	QF	2R	4R	**W**	QF	A	4R	SF	4R	1R	4R	3R	F	A	SF	A	QF	1R	3R	A	1R	A	3R	A
(Australia) Kim Warwick	2R	1R	1R	3R	2R	2R	A	F	A	A	A	QF	A	1R	QF	A	A	A	3R	1R	A	A	A	2R
(Sweden) Mats Wilander									A	3R	A	1R	**W**	4R	4R	A	F	3R	QF	**W**	SF	2R	QF	**W**
	FRA	WIM	USA	AUS	FRA	WIM	USA	AUS	FRA	WIM	USA	AUS	FRA	WIM	USA	AUS	FRA	WIM	USA	AUS	FRA	WIM	USA	AUS
Player	1979				1980				1981				1994				1982				1983			

== 1985–1990 ==
Winner of most titles: Ivan Lendl, with 7.

Player	1985				1986			1987				1988					1989				1990			
Player	FRA	WIM	USA	AUS	FRA	WIM	USA	AUS	FRA	WIM	USA	AUS	FRA	WIM	USA	OLY	AUS	FRA	WIM	USA	AUS	FRA	WIM	USA
(United States) Andre Agassi					A	A	1R	A	2R	1R	1R	A	SF	A	SF	A	3R	A	SF	A	A	F	A	F
(West Germany) Boris Becker	2R	**W**	4R	2R	QF	**W**	SF	4R	SF	2R	4R	A	4R	F	2R	A	4R	SF	**W**	**W**	QF	1R	F	SF
(Spain) Sergi Bruguera															A	A	A	4R	1R	1R	2R	2R	2R	2R
(Australia) Pat Cash	A	2R	A	A	A	1R	1R	F	1R	**W**	1R	F	4R	QF	A	A	4R	A	A	A	A	A	4R	3R
(United States) Michael Chang											2R	A	3R	2R	4R	A	A	**W**	4R	4R	A	QF	4R	3R
(United States) Jimmy Connors	SF	SF	SF	A	A	1R	3R	A	QF	SF	SF	A	A	4R	QF	A	A	2R	2R	QF	A	A	A	A
(United States) Jim Courier													A	A	2R	A	A	4R	1R	3R	2R	4R	3R	2R
(United States) Kevin Curren	A	F	1R	A	A	1R	2R	3R	A	2R	A	A	A	1R	A	A	A	A	3R	A	A	A	QF	4R
(United States) Steve Denton	A	2R	1R	2R	A	A	A	1R	A	A	A													
(Sweden) Stefan Edberg	QF	4R	4R	**W**	2R	3R	SF	**W**	2R	SF	SF	SF	4R	**W**	4R	B	QF	F	F	4R	F	1R	**W**	1R
(United States) Vitas Gerulaitis	1R	3R	3R	A	A	A																		
(Ecuador) Andrés Gómez	3R	A	A	A	QF	1R	2R	A	QF	4R	4R	A	2R	A	3R	A	A	2R	2R	3R	4R	**W**	1R	1R
(Socialist Federal Republic of Yugoslavia) Goran Ivanišević												A	A	1R	A	1R	QF	4R	2R	2R	1R	QF	SF	3R
(Czech Republic) Petr Korda								A	A	A	A	A	2R	3R	1R	A	A	A	A	A	2R	2R	1R	2R
(United States) Johan Kriek	A	3R	2R	QF	SF	2R	3R	2R	1R	2R	3R	2R	A	1R	3R	A	3R	A	1R	1R				
(France) Henri Leconte	1R	QF	4R	4R	SF	SF	QF	3R	1R	QF	4R	3R	F	4R	3R	2R	1R	A	A	A	A	QF	2R	2R
(Czechoslovakia) Ivan Lendl	F	4R	**W**	SF	**W**	F	**W**	SF	**W**	F	**W**	SF	QF	SF	F	A	**W**	4R	SF	F	**W**	A	SF	QF
(United Kingdom) John Lloyd	2R	3R	2R	QF	1R	1R	A																	
(United States) John McEnroe	SF	QF	F	QF	A	A	1R	A	1R	A	QF	A	4R	2R	2R	A	QF	A	SF	2R	4R	A	1R	SF
(Czechoslovakia) Miloslav Mečíř	3R	1R	2R	A	2R	QF	F	A	SF	3R	QF	A	A	SF	3R	**G**	F	1R	3R	3R	4R	1R	2R	A
(Austria) Thomas Muster	A	1R	A	A	2R	A	1R	A	3R	1R	3R	1R	3R	A	1R	A	SF	A	A	A	3R	SF	A	4R
(France) Yannick Noah	A	4R	3R	QF	4R	A	3R	QF	QF	2R	A	4R	4R	A	2R	A	1R	1R	A	QF	SF	3R	1R	2R
(Sweden) Mikael Pernfors	A	A	1R	A	F	4R	2R	A	1R	4R	1R	A	1R	A	A	A	3R	1R	2R	4R	QF	A	A	1R
(Switzerland) Marc Rosset															A	A	A	A	A	A	1R	2R	3R	1R
(United States) Pete Sampras												A	A	A	1R	A	1R	2R	1R	4R	4R	A	1R	**W**
(West Germany) Michael Stich																		2R	1R	1R	3R	2R	3R	2R
(United States) Brian Teacher	A	1R	3R	2R	A	2R	1R																	
(Argentina) Guillermo Vilas	2R	A	2R	A	QF	1R	1R	A	2R	A	A	A	2R	A	A	A	A	1R						
(United States) MaliVai Washington																		A	A	2R	A	1R	2R	2R
(Sweden) Mats Wilander	**W**	1R	SF	F	3R	4R	4R	A	F	QF	F	**W**	**W**	QF	**W**	A	2R	QF	QF	2R	SF	A	A	1R
	FRA	WIM	USA	AUS	FRA	WIM	USA	AUS	FRA	WIM	USA	AUS	FRA	WIM	USA	OLY	AUS	FRA	WIM	USA	AUS	FRA	WIM	USA
Player	1985				1986			1987				1988					1989				1990			

== 1991–1996 ==
Winner of most titles: Pete Sampras, with 7.

Player	1991				1992					1993				1994				1995				1996				
Player	AUS	FRA	WIM	USA	AUS	FRA	WIM	OLY	USA	AUS	FRA	WIM	USA	AUS	FRA	WIM	USA	AUS	FRA	WIM	USA	AUS	FRA	WIM	OLY	USA
(United States) Andre Agassi	A	F	QF	1R	A	SF	**W**	A	QF	A	A	QF	1R	A	2R	4R	**W**	**W**	QF	SF	F	SF	2R	1R	**G**	SF
(Germany) Boris Becker	**W**	SF	F	3R	3R	A	QF	3R	4R	1R	2R	SF	4R	A	A	SF	1R	1R	3R	F	SF	**W**	A	3R	A	A
(Spain) Alberto Berasategui					A	1R	A	A	A	A	2R	A	2R	A	F	A	1R	A	3R	A	A	A	3R	A	A	2R
(Spain) Sergi Bruguera	1R	2R	A	2R	A	1R	A	2R	2R	4R	**W**	A	1R	A	**W**	4R	4R	A	SF	A	2R	A	2R	A	S	3R
(Australia) Pat Cash	3R	2R	2R	A	2R	A	2R	A	A	A	A	A	A	A	A	A	A	1R	A	1R	A	A	A	A	A	1R
(United States) Michael Chang	A	QF	1R	4R	3R	3R	1R	2R	SF	2R	2R	3R	QF	A	3R	QF	4R	SF	F	2R	QF	F	3R	1R	A	F
(United States) Jimmy Connors	A	3R	3R	SF	A	1R	1R	A	2R	A	A	A	A	A	A	A	A	A	A	A	A	A				
(Spain) Àlex Corretja					A	1R	A	A	1R	A	1R	A	1R	A	3R	2R	1R	A	4R	A	2R	2R	2R	2R	A	QF
(Spain) Albert Costa													A	A	1R	1R	1R	A	QF	A	A	2R	2R	2R	2R	1R
(United States) Jim Courier	4R	**W**	QF	F	**W**	**W**	3R	3R	SF	**W**	F	F	4R	SF	SF	2R	2R	QF	4R	2R	SF	QF	QF	1R	A	A
(United States) Kevin Curren	A	A	2R	2R	A	2R	1R	1R																		
(Sweden) Stefan Edberg	SF	QF	SF	**W**	F	3R	QF	1R	**W**	F	QF	SF	2R	SF	1R	2R	3R	4R	2R	2R	3R	2R	4R	2R	A	QF
(Ecuador) Andrés Gómez	A	A	A	1R	1R	2R	A	A																		
(Socialist Federal Republic of Yugoslavia) / (Croatia) Goran Ivanišević	3R	2R	2R	4R	2R	QF	F	B	3R	A	3R	3R	2R	QF	QF	F	1R	1R	1R	SF	1R	3R	4R	QF	1R	SF
(Sweden) Thomas Johansson														1R	A	A	A	A	1R	A	A	2R	2R	4R	A	2R
(Russia) Yevgeny Kafelnikov									A	A	2R	A	A	2R	3R	3R	4R	QF	SF	QF	3R	QF	**W**	1R	A	A
(Czech Republic) Petr Korda	2R	2R	1R	2R	1R	F	2R	A	1R	QF	2R	4R	1R	1R	1R	2R	A	3R	1R	4R	QF	1R	3R	A	A	3R
(Netherlands) Richard Krajicek	4R	2R	3R	1R	SF	3R	3R	A	4R	2R	SF	4R	4R	A	3R	1R	2R	2R	2R	1R	3R	3R	QF	**W**	A	1R
(France) Henri Leconte	A	2R	3R	A	1R	SF	3R	2R	3R	A	1R	4R	1R	2R	1R	1R	A	A	A	1R	A	A	1R			
(Czechoslovakia) / (United States) Ivan Lendl	F	A	3R	SF	QF	2R	4R	A	QF	1R	1R	2R	1R	4R	1R	A	2R									
(United States) Todd Martin	A	4R	A	3R	A	A	2R	A	3R	1R	1R	QF	3R	F	3R	SF	SF	4R	3R	4R	4R	3R	3R	SF	A	3R
(United States) John McEnroe	A	1R	4R	3R	QF	1R	SF	A	4R	A	A	A	A	A												
(Ukraine) Andriy Medvedev					A	4R	A	A	A	3R	SF	2R	QF	A	QF	4R	2R	QF	4R	2R	2R	2R	2R	1R	A	4R
(Spain) Carlos Moyá																		A	A	A	A	1R	2R	1R	A	2R
(Austria) Thomas Muster	A	1R	A	A	3R	2R	1R	1R	A	2R	4R	1R	QF	QF	3R	1R	QF	3R	**W**	A	4R	4R	4R	A	A	QF
(Sweden) Mikael Pernfors	A	A	A	1R	A	A	A	A	2R	1R	1R	A	A													
(Australia) Mark Philippoussis														1R	A	A	A	1R	A	A	3R	4R	2R	2R	3R	4R
(France) Cédric Pioline	1R	2R	2R	1R	2R	4R	2R	A	3R	2R	2R	QF	F	1R	2R	1R	3R	1R	2R	QF	2R	A	QF	4R	3R	3R
(Australia) Patrick Rafter					1R	A	A	A	A	1R	A	3R	1R	3R	4R	2R	3R	4R	1R	1R	2R	2R	1R	4R	A	1R
(Chile) Marcelo Ríos														A	2R	A	2R	A	2R	1R	1R	1R	4R	A	A	2R
(Switzerland) Marc Rosset	1R	1R	1R	1R	4R	1R	3R	**G**	1R	A	2R	1R	1R	3R	1R	2R	3R	1R	2R	1R	4R	A	SF	3R	3R	1R
(United Kingdom) Greg Rusedski												1R	A	1R	3R	2R	1R	3R	A	4R	1R	1R	2R	2R	3R	1R
(United States) Pete Sampras	A	2R	2R	QF	A	QF	SF	3R	F	SF	QF	**W**	**W**	**W**	QF	**W**	4R	F	1R	**W**	**W**	3R	SF	QF	A	**W**
(Germany) Michael Stich	3R	SF	**W**	QF	QF	3R	QF	2R	2R	SF	4R	QF	1R	1R	2R	1R	F	3R	4R	1R	4R	A	F	4R	A	2R
(United States) MaliVai Washington	1R	1R	2R	3R	3R	2R	1R	A	4R	4R	4R	2R	3R	QF	1R	1R	2R	1R	2R	1R	1R	4R	1R	F	QF	2R
(Sweden) Mats Wilander	4R	2R	A	A	A	A	A	A	A	A	A	A	3R	4R	1R	A	1R	1R	2R	3R	2R	A	2R	A	A	A
	AUS	FRA	WIM	USA	AUS	FRA	WIM	OLY	USA	AUS	FRA	WIM	USA	AUS	FRA	WIM	USA	AUS	FRA	WIM	USA	AUS	FRA	WIM	OLY	USA
Player	1991				1992					1993				1994				1995				1996				

== 1997–2002 ==
Winner of most titles: Pete Sampras, with 6.

Player	1997				1998				1999				2000					2001				2002			
Player	AUS	FRA	WIM	USA	AUS	FRA	WIM	USA	AUS	FRA	WIM	USA	AUS	FRA	WIM	USA	OLY	AUS	FRA	WIM	USA	AUS	FRA	WIM	USA
(United States) Andre Agassi	A	A	A	4R	4R	1R	2R	4R	4R	**W**	F	**W**	**W**	2R	SF	2R	A	**W**	QF	SF	QF	A	QF	2R	F
(Germany) Boris Becker	1R	A	QF	A	A	A	A	A	A	A	4R	Retired													
(Spain) Alberto Berasategui	3R	1R	A	1R	QF	4R	A	1R	1R	4R	A	A	1R	1R	1R	A	A	A	Retired						
(Spain) Sergi Bruguera	3R	F	A	4R	1R	1R	A	2R	A	A	A	A	A	1R	A	A	A	1R	2R	1R	1R	Retired			
(United States) Michael Chang	SF	4R	1R	SF	2R	3R	2R	2R	2R	1R	A	2R	1R	3R	2R	1R	2R	1R	2R	2R	1R	1R	1R	2R	2R
(France) Arnaud Clément	A	1R	3R	A	1R	1R	1R	1R	2R	2R	2R	4R	4R	2R	2R	QF	2R	F	1R	4R	4R	2R	3R	4R	4R
(Spain) Àlex Corretja	2R	4R	A	3R	3R	F	1R	4R	2R	QF	A	1R	2R	QF	A	3R	3R	A	F	A	3R	1R	SF	A	3R
(Spain) Albert Costa	QF	3R	A	1R	2R	4R	2R	1R	1R	3R	1R	1R	1R	QF	A	2R	1R	A	1R	A	4R	4R	**W**	A	2R
(United States) Jim Courier	4R	1R	1R	1R	A	2R	1R	A	3R	2R	4R	1R	1R	Retired											
(Sweden) Thomas Enqvist	4R	A	A	A	2R	3R	3R	A	F	2R	3R	1R	1R	3R	4R	4R	A	A	4R	QF	1R	2R	2R	2R	3R
(Switzerland) Roger Federer									A	1R	1R	A	3R	4R	1R	3R	SF	3R	QF	QF	4R	4R	1R	1R	4R
(Spain) Juan Carlos Ferrero									A	A	A	1R	3R	SF	A	4R	QF	2R	SF	3R	3R	A	F	2R	3R
(Germany) Tommy Haas	A	A	2R	3R	1R	1R	3R	2R	SF	3R	3R	4R	2R	3R	3R	2R	S	2R	2R	1R	4R	SF	4R	A	4R
(Australia) Lleyton Hewitt	1R	A	A	A	1R	A	A	A	2R	1R	3R	3R	4R	4R	1R	SF	1R	3R	QF	4R	**W**	1R	4R	**W**	SF
(Croatia) Goran Ivanišević	QF	1R	2R	1R	1R	1R	F	4R	A	1R	4R	3R	2R	1R	1R	1R	1R	A	A	**W**	3R	2R	A	A	A
(Sweden) Thomas Johansson	2R	1R	2R	1R	1R	1R	3R	QF	1R	A	2R	A	2R	2R	4R	QF	1R	3R	1R	2R	4R	**W**	2R	1R	A
(Russia) Yevgeny Kafelnikov	A	QF	4R	2R	A	2R	1R	4R	**W**	2R	3R	SF	F	QF	2R	3R	**G**	QF	QF	3R	SF	2R	2R	3R	2R
(Czech Republic) Petr Korda	1R	4R	4R	QF	**W**	1R	QF	1R	3R	2R	Retired														
(Netherlands) Richard Krajicek	A	3R	4R	QF	A	3R	SF	3R	3R	2R	3R	QF	2R	3R	2R	QF	A	A	A	A	A	A	A	QF	1R
(Brazil) Gustavo Kuerten	2R	**W**	1R	3R	2R	2R	1R	3R	2R	QF	QF	QF	1R	**W**	3R	1R	QF	2R	**W**	A	QF	1R	4R	A	4R
(United States) Todd Martin	A	A	A	2R	2R	1R	4R	2R	QF	A	QF	F	2R	1R	2R	SF	1R	QF	1R	4R	2R	3R	2R	2R	1R
(Ukraine) Andriy Medvedev	4R	4R	3R	1R	2R	1R	2R	2R	2R	F	2R	4R	1R	4R	1R	A	A	2R	1R	1R	A	Retired			
(Spain) Carlos Moyá	F	2R	2R	1R	2R	**W**	2R	SF	1R	4R	2R	2R	A	1R	1R	4R	A	QF	2R	2R	3R	2R	3R	A	2R
(Austria) Thomas Muster	SF	3R	A	1R	1R	QF	A	3R	1R	1R	Retired														
(Argentina) David Nalbandian																		A	A	A	3R	2R	3R	F	1R
(Sweden) Magnus Norman	1R	QF	3R	2R	1R	2R	1R	2R	2R	1R	3R	4R	SF	F	2R	4R	3R	4R	1R	A	A	A	1R	A	1R
(Australia) Mark Philippoussis	A	4R	1R	3R	2R	2R	QF	F	4R	1R	QF	A	4R	4R	QF	2R	3R	A	A	A	A	2R	2R	4R	1R
(France) Cédric Pioline	A	3R	F	4R	4R	SF	1R	1R	1R	1R	QF	SF	1R	4R	2R	3R	A	3R	2R	2R	1R	A	1R	1R	Retired
(Australia) Patrick Rafter	1R	SF	4R	**W**	3R	2R	4R	**W**	3R	3R	SF	1R	A	2R	F	1R	2R	SF	1R	F	4R	Retired			
(Chile) Marcelo Ríos	QF	4R	4R	QF	F	QF	1R	3R	A	QF	A	4R	A	1R	A	3R	1R	1R	2R	A	3R	QF	A	A	3R
(United States) Andy Roddick													A	A	A	1R	A	A	3R	3R	QF	2R	1R	3R	QF
(Switzerland) Marc Rosset	2R	4R	2R	1R	2R	1R	2R	1R	QF	1R	2R	1R	2R	2R	4R	2R	A	2R	1R	1R	1R	A	A	2R	1R
(United Kingdom) Greg Rusedski	1R	1R	QF	F	3R	1R	1R	3R	2R	4R	4R	4R	A	1R	1R	2R	1R	4R	2R	4R	3R	3R	A	4R	3R
(Russia) Marat Safin					A	4R	1R	4R	3R	4R	A	2R	1R	QF	2R	**W**	1R	4R	3R	QF	SF	F	SF	2R	2R
(United States) Pete Sampras	**W**	3R	**W**	4R	QF	2R	**W**	SF	A	2R	**W**	A	SF	1R	**W**	F	A	4R	2R	4R	F	4R	1R	2R	**W**
(Germany) Rainer Schüttler	LQ	LQ	LQ	LQ	LQ	LQ	1R	LQ	1R	1R	2R	1R	2R	1R	3R	3R	2R	4R	1R	2R	2R	3R	2R	3R	1R
(Sweden) Robin Söderling																						A	A	A	2R
(Germany) Michael Stich	2R	A	SF	Retired																					
	AUS	FRA	WIM	USA	AUS	FRA	WIM	USA	AUS	FRA	WIM	USA	AUS	FRA	WIM	USA	OLY	AUS	FRA	WIM	USA	AUS	FRA	WIM	USA
Player	1997				1998				1999				2000					2001				2002			

== 2003–2008 ==
Winner of most titles: Roger Federer, with 13.

Player	2003				2004					2005				2006				2007				2008				
Player	AUS	FRA	WIM	USA	AUS	FRA	WIM	OLY	USA	AUS	FRA	WIM	USA	AUS	FRA	WIM	USA	AUS	FRA	WIM	USA	AUS	FRA	WIM	OLY	USA
(United States) Andre Agassi	**W**	QF	4R	SF	SF	1R	A	A	QF	QF	1R	A	F	A	A	3R	3R	Retired								
(South Africa) Kevin Anderson																						1R	A	1R	2R	A
(Cyprus) Marcos Baghdatis				LQ	A	LQ	LQ	2R	2R	4R	1R	1R	1R	F	2R	SF	2R	2R	4R	QF	1R	3R	1R	4R	A	A
(Czech Republic) Tomáš Berdych	A	A	A	2R	2R	1R	QF	1R	4R	1R	2R	3R	3R	2R	4R	4R	4R	4R	1R	QF	4R	4R	2R	3R	3R	1R
(Croatia) **Marin Čilić**															LQ	A	LQ	1R	1R	1R	LQ	4R	2R	4R	2R	3R
(France) Arnaud Clément	A	4R	2R	2R	1R	1R	1R	2R	2R	1R	2R	1R	3R	1R	A	2R	1R	2R	1R	1R	2R	1R	1R	QF	A	1R
(Argentina) Guillermo Coria	4R	SF	1R	QF	1R	F	2R	A	A	4R	4R	4R	QF	3R	A	A	1R	A	A	A	A	A	1R	A	A	A
(Serbia) **Novak Djokovic**										1R	2R	3R	3R	1R	QF	4R	3R	4R	SF	SF	F	**W**	SF	2R	B	SF
(Switzerland) Roger Federer	4R	1R	**W**	4R	**W**	3R	**W**	2R	**W**	SF	SF	**W**	**W**	**W**	F	**W**	**W**	**W**	F	**W**	**W**	SF	F	F	QF	**W**
(Spain) David Ferrer	1R	2R	2R	1R	2R	2R	2R	A	1R	1R	QF	1R	3R	4R	3R	4R	3R	4R	3R	2R	SF	QF	QF	1R	3R	3R
(Spain) Juan Carlos Ferrero	QF	**W**	4R	F	SF	2R	3R	2R	2R	3R	3R	4R	1R	3R	3R	3R	2R	2R	3R	QF	1R	4R	1R	2R	A	A
(Argentina) Gastón Gaudio	2R	3R	1R	1R	2R	**W**	A	A	2R	3R	4R	A	1R	3R	4R	2R	3R	1R	2R	A	A	A	A	A	A	A
(Chile) Fernando González	2R	QF	1R	3R	1R	1R	3R	B	1R	3R	3R	QF	3R	1R	2R	3R	3R	F	1R	3R	1R	3R	QF	2R	S	4R
(Germany) Tommy Haas	A	A	A	A	A	1R	2R	2R	QF	2R	3R	1R	3R	4R	3R	3R	QF	SF	A	4R	QF	A	A	3R	A	2R
(Australia) Lleyton Hewitt	4R	3R	1R	QF	4R	QF	QF	A	F	F	A	SF	SF	2R	4R	QF	QF	3R	4R	4R	2R	4R	3R	4R	2R	A
(Croatia) Goran Ivanišević	A	A	A	A	A	A	3R	Retired																		
(Sweden) Thomas Johansson	A	A	A	A	1R	A	3R	A	3R	4R	2R	SF	2R	4R	1R	1R	1R	2R	1R	1R	3R	1R	1R	2R	2R	1R
(Brazil) Gustavo Kuerten	2R	4R	2R	1R	3R	QF	A	1R	1R	A	1R	A	2R	A	A	A	A	A	A	A	A	A	1R	Retired		
(United States) Todd Martin	A	2R	3R	4R	3R	1R	2R	A	1R	Retired																
(Spain) Carlos Moyá	2R	QF	A	4R	A	QF	4R	QF	3R	1R	4R	A	2R	1R	3R	A	3R	1R	QF	1R	QF	1R	1R	A	A	2R
(United Kingdom) Andy Murray										A	A	3R	2R	1R	1R	4R	4R	4R	A	A	3R	1R	3R	QF	1R	F
(Spain) Rafael Nadal	A	A	3R	2R	3R	A	A	A	2R	4R	**W**	2R	3R	A	**W**	F	QF	QF	**W**	F	4R	SF	**W**	**W**	**G**	SF
(Argentina) David Nalbandian	QF	2R	4R	SF	QF	SF	A	A	2R	QF	4R	QF	QF	SF	SF	3R	2R	4R	4R	3R	3R	3R	2R	1R	3R	3R
(Japan) **Kei Nishikori**																					LQ	A	A	1R	1R	4R
(Australia) Mark Philippoussis	3R	2R	F	3R	4R	1R	4R	1R	1R	A	A	2R	1R	1R	A	2R	1R	A	A	A	A	A	A	A	A	A
(Argentina) Juan Martín del Potro										A	A	A	A	A	1R	A	1R	2R	1R	2R	3R	2R	2R	2R	A	QF
(Argentina) Mariano Puerta	1R	2R	1R	1R	A	A	A	A	A	A	F	1R	2R	Suspended							A	A	A	A	A	A
(United States) Andy Roddick	SF	1R	SF	**W**	QF	2R	F	3R	QF	SF	2R	F	1R	4R	1R	3R	F	SF	1R	QF	QF	3R	A	2R	A	QF
(United Kingdom) Greg Rusedski	A	1R	2R	1R	1R	1R	2R	A	1R	2R	1R	2R	1R	A	1R	1R	1R	A	Retired							
(Russia) Marat Safin	3R	A	A	A	F	4R	1R	2R	1R	**W**	4R	3R	A	A	1R	2R	4R	3R	2R	3R	2R	2R	2R	SF	A	2R
(Germany) Rainer Schüttler	F	4R	4R	4R	1R	1R	3R	1R	1R	2R	2R	1R	2R	1R	1R	1R	1R	1R	A	A	1R	2R	1R	SF	2R	1R
(Sweden) Robin Söderling	A	A	3R	1R	2R	1R	1R	1R	2R	1R	2R	1R	3R	A	1R	1R	2R	1R	1R	3R	A	A	3R	2R	1R	1R
(France) Jo-Wilfried Tsonga										A	1R	A	A	A	A	A	A	1R	A	4R	3R	F	A	A	A	3R
(Netherlands) Martin Verkerk	1R	F	1R	2R	1R	3R	2R	A	A	A	A	A	A	A	A	A	A	A	1R	A	A	A	A	A	A	A
(Switzerland) Stan Wawrinka					LQ	LQ	A	A	LQ	LQ	3R	1R	3R	2R	1R	3R	3R	3R	2R	1R	4R	2R	3R	4R	2R	4R
	AUS	FRA	WIM	USA	AUS	FRA	WIM	OLY	USA	AUS	FRA	WIM	USA	AUS	FRA	WIM	USA	AUS	FRA	WIM	USA	AUS	FRA	WIM	OLY	USA
Player	2003				2004					2005				2006				2007				2008				

== 2009–2014 ==
Winner of most titles: Rafael Nadal, with 9.

Player	2009				2010				2011				2012					2013				2014			
Player	AUS	FRA	WIM	USA	AUS	FRA	WIM	USA	AUS	FRA	WIM	USA	AUS	FRA	WIM	OLY	USA	AUS	FRA	WIM	USA	AUS	FRA	WIM	USA
(South Africa) Kevin Anderson	1R	LQ	LQ	LQ	1R	1R	1R	3R	1R	2R	2R	3R	3R	3R	1R	A	1R	4R	4R	3R	2R	4R	4R	4R	3R
(Cyprus) Marcos Baghdatis	4R	1R	A	A	3R	3R	1R	1R	3R	2R	3R	1R	2R	2R	3R	QF	2R	3R	1R	1R	3R	1R	A	2R	1R
(Czech Republic) Tomáš Berdych	4R	1R	4R	3R	2R	SF	F	1R	QF	1R	4R	3R	QF	4R	1R	1R	SF	QF	1R	QF	4R	SF	QF	3R	QF
(Croatia) **Marin Čilić**	4R	4R	3R	QF	SF	4R	1R	2R	4R	1R	1R	3R	A	3R	4R	2R	QF	3R	3R	2R	A	2R	3R	QF	**W**
(France) Arnaud Clément	2R	2R	1R	A	1R	1R	3R	3R	A	2R	1R	LQ	LQ	2R	LQ	Retired									
(Serbia) **Novak Djokovic**	QF	3R	QF	SF	QF	QF	SF	F	**W**	SF	**W**	**W**	**W**	F	SF	SF	F	**W**	SF	F	F	QF	F	**W**	SF
(Switzerland) Roger Federer	F	**W**	**W**	F	**W**	QF	QF	SF	SF	F	QF	SF	SF	SF	**W**	S	QF	SF	QF	2R	4R	SF	4R	F	SF
(Spain) David Ferrer	3R	3R	3R	2R	2R	3R	4R	4R	SF	4R	4R	4R	QF	SF	QF	3R	SF	SF	F	QF	QF	QF	QF	2R	3R
(Spain) Juan Carlos Ferrero	1R	2R	QF	4R	1R	3R	1R	3R	A	A	A	4R	1R	2R	1R	A	A	Retired							
(Argentina) Gastón Gaudio	A	1R	A	LQ	A	LQ	A	A	A	A	A	Retired													
(Chile) Fernando González	4R	SF	3R	QF	4R	2R	A	1R	A	A	3R	1R	A	Retired											
(Germany) Tommy Haas	3R	4R	SF	3R	3R	A	A	A	A	1R	1R	3R	2R	3R	1R	A	1R	1R	QF	4R	3R	1R	1R	A	A
(Australia) Lleyton Hewitt	1R	3R	QF	3R	4R	3R	4R	1R	1R	A	2R	A	4R	1R	1R	3R	3R	1R	A	2R	4R	1R	1R	2R	1R
(Australia) **Nick Kyrgios**													LQ	A	A	A	A	LQ	2R	A	1R	2R	1R	QF	3R
(Spain) Carlos Moyá	1R	A	A	A	1R	A	A	A	Retired																
(United Kingdom) Andy Murray	4R	QF	SF	4R	F	4R	SF	3R	F	SF	SF	SF	SF	QF	F	**G**	**W**	F	A	**W**	QF	QF	SF	QF	QF
(Spain) Rafael Nadal	**W**	4R	A	SF	QF	**W**	**W**	**W**	QF	**W**	F	F	F	**W**	2R	A	A	A	**W**	1R	**W**	F	**W**	4R	A
(Argentina) David Nalbandian	2R	A	A	A	A	A	A	3R	2R	A	3R	2R	2R	1R	1R	1R	A	A	A	A	A	Retired			
(Japan) Kei Nishikori	1R	A	A	A	A	2R	1R	3R	3R	2R	1R	1R	QF	A	3R	QF	3R	4R	4R	3R	1R	4R	1R	4R	F
(Argentina) Juan Martín del Potro	QF	SF	2R	**W**	4R	A	A	A	2R	3R	4R	3R	QF	QF	4R	B	QF	3R	A	SF	2R	2R	A	A	A
(Canada) Milos Raonic								1R	4R	1R	2R	A	3R	3R	2R	2R	4R	4R	3R	2R	4R	3R	QF	SF	4R
(United States) Andy Roddick	SF	4R	F	3R	QF	3R	4R	2R	4R	A	3R	QF	2R	1R	3R	2R	4R	Retired							
(Russia) Marat Safin	3R	2R	1R	1R	Retired																				
(Germany) Rainer Schüttler	1R	1R	2R	1R	2R	1R	2R	1R	A	1R	2R	A	LQ	A	A	A	A	Retired							
(Sweden) Robin Söderling	2R	F	4R	QF	1R	F	QF	QF	4R	QF	3R	A	A	A	A	A	A	A	A	A	A	A	A	A	A
(Austria) Dominic Thiem																						2R	2R	1R	4R
(France) Jo-Wilfried Tsonga	QF	4R	3R	4R	SF	4R	QF	A	3R	3R	SF	QF	4R	QF	SF	QF	2R	QF	SF	2R	A	4R	4R	4R	4R
(Switzerland) Stan Wawrinka	3R	3R	4R	1R	3R	4R	1R	QF	QF	4R	2R	2R	3R	4R	1R	1R	4R	4R	QF	1R	SF	**W**	1R	QF	QF
	AUS	FRA	WIM	USA	AUS	FRA	WI	USA	AUS	FRA	WIM	USA	AUS	FRA	WIM	OLY	USA	AUS	FRA	WIM	USA	AUS	FRA	WIM	USA
Player	2009				2010				2011				2012					2013				2014			

== 2015–2020 ==
Winner of most titles: Novak Djokovic, with 10.

Player	2015				2016					2017				2018				2019				2020			
Player	AUS	FRA	WIM	USA	AUS	FRA	WIM	OLY	USA	AUS	FRA	WIM	USA	AUS	FRA	WIM	USA	AUS	FRA	WIM	USA	AUS	WIM	USA	FRA
(South Africa) Kevin Anderson	4R	3R	4R	QF	1R	1R	1R	A	3R	A	4R	4R	F	1R	4R	F	4R	2R	A	3R	A	2R	NH	1R	3R
(Cyprus) Marcos Baghdatis	3R	2R	3R	1R	1R	1R	1R	A	4R	2R	1R	2R	1R	2R	1R	2R	2R	LQ	A	2R	Retired				
(Czech Republic) Tomáš Berdych	SF	4R	4R	4R	QF	QF	SF	A	A	3R	2R	SF	2R	QF	1R	A	A	4R	A	1R	1R	Retired			
(Italy) **Matteo Berrettini**													LQ	1R	3R	2R	1R	1R	2R	4R	SF	2R	NH	4R	3R
(Croatia) **Marin Čilić**	A	4R	QF	SF	3R	1R	QF	3R	3R	2R	QF	F	3R	F	QF	2R	QF	4R	2R	2R	4R	4R	NH	3R	1R
(Serbia) **Novak Djokovic**	**W**	F	**W**	**W**	**W**	**W**	3R	1R	F	2R	QF	QF	A	4R	QF	**W**	**W**	**W**	SF	**W**	4R	**W**	NH	4R	F
(Switzerland) Roger Federer	3R	QF	F	F	SF	A	SF	A	A	**W**	A	**W**	QF	**W**	A	QF	4R	4R	SF	F	QF	SF	NH	A	A
(Spain) David Ferrer	4R	QF	A	3R	QF	4R	2R	2R	3R	3R	2R	3R	1R	1R	1R	1R	1R	A	Retired						
(United States) **Taylor Fritz**	A	A	A	LQ	1R	1R	1R	A	1R	1R	A	1R	2R	LQ	1R	2R	3R	3R	2R	2R	1R	3R	NH	3R	3R
(Australia) Lleyton Hewitt	2R	A	1R	2R	2R	Retired																			
(Russia) **Karen Khachanov**			LQ	LQ	LQ	LQ	LQ	A	2R	2R	4R	3R	1R	2R	4R	4R	3R	3R	QF	3R	1R	3R	NH	3R	4R
(Australia) **Nick Kyrgios**	QF	3R	4R	1R	3R	3R	4R	A	3R	2R	2R	1R	1R	4R	A	3R	3R	1R	A	2R	3R	4R	NH	A	A
(Russia) **Daniil Medvedev**								LQ	LQ	1R	1R	2R	1R	2R	1R	3R	3R	4R	1R	3R	F	4R	NH	SF	1R
(United Kingdom) Andy Murray	F	SF	SF	4R	F	F	**W**	**G**	QF	4R	SF	QF	A	A	A	A	2R	1R	A	A	A	A	NH	2R	1R
(Spain) Rafael Nadal	QF	QF	2R	3R	1R	3R	A	SF	4R	F	**W**	4R	**W**	QF	**W**	SF	SF	F	**W**	SF	**W**	QF	NH	A	**W**
(Japan) Kei Nishikori	QF	QF	2R	1R	QF	4R	4R	B	SF	4R	QF	3R	A	A	4R	QF	SF	QF	QF	QF	3R	A	NH	A	2R
(Argentina) Juan Martín del Potro	A	A	A	A	A	A	3R	S	QF	A	3R	2R	SF	3R	SF	QF	F	A	4R	A	A	A	NH	A	A
(Canada) Milos Raonic	QF	A	3R	3R	SF	4R	F	A	2R	QF	4R	QF	A	1R	A	QF	4R	QF	A	4R	A	QF	NH	2R	A
(Norway) **Casper Ruud**										LQ	LQ	A	LQ	2R	2R	LQ	1R	LQ	3R	1R	1R	1R	3R	NH	3R
(Austria) Dominic Thiem	1R	2R	2R	3R	3R	SF	2R	A	4R	4R	SF	4R	4R	4R	F	1R	QF	2R	F	1R	1R	F	NH	**W**	QF
(Greece) **Stefanos Tsitsipas**										LQ	1R	1R	LQ	1R	2R	4R	2R	SF	4R	1R	1R	3R	NH	SF	3R
(France) Jo-Wilfried Tsonga	A	SF	3R	QF	4R	3R	QF	2R	QF	QF	1R	3R	2R	3R	A	A	A	2R	2R	3R	1R	1R	NH	A	A
(Switzerland) Stan Wawrinka	SF	**W**	QF	SF	4R	SF	2R	A	**W**	SF	F	1R	A	2R	1R	2R	3R	2R	QF	2R	QF	QF	NH	A	3R
(Germany) **Alexander Zverev**	LQ	LQ	2R	1R	1R	3R	3R	A	2R	3R	1R	4R	2R	3R	QF	3R	3R	4R	QF	1R	4R	SF	NH	F	4R
	AUS	FRA	WIM	USA	AUS	FRA	WIM	OLY	USA	AUS	FRA	WIM	USA	AUS	FRA	WIM	USA	AUS	FRA	WIM	USA	AUS	WIM	USA	FRA
Player	2015				2016					2017				2018				2019				2020			

== 2021–2026 ==
Winner of most titles: Novak Djokovic and Carlos Alcaraz, with 7 each.

Player	2021					2022				2023				2024					2025				2026			
Player	AUS	FRA	WIM	OLY	USA	AUS	FRA	WIM	USA	AUS	FRA	WIM	USA	AUS	FRA	WIM	OLY	USA	AUS	FRA	WIM	USA	AUS	FRA	WIM	USA
(Spain) **Alcaraz**	2R	3R	2R	A	QF	3R	QF	4R	**W**	A	SF	**W**	SF	QF	**W**	**W**	S	2R	QF	**W**	F	**W**	**W**	A	A	QF
(South Africa) Anderson	1R	1R	2R	A	2R	1R	Retired						LQ	A	A	A	A	A	Retired							
(Italy) **Berrettini**	4R	QF	F	A	QF	SF	A	A	QF	1R	A	4R	2R	A	A	2R	A	2R	2R	A	1R	A	A	QF	3R	2R
(Spain) **Carreño**	3R	4R	1R	B	1R	4R	1R	1R	4R	2R	A	A	A	A	1R	A	A	1R	2R	2R	A	2R	1R	4R	2R	1R
(Croatia) **Čilić**	1R	2R	3R	2R	1R	4R	SF	A	4R	A	A	A	A	1R	A	A	A	A	A	1R	4R	1R	3R	1R	1R	A
(Italy) **Cobolli**						LQ	LQ	LQ	LQ	LQ	1R	LQ	LQ	3R	2R	2R	A	3R	1R	3R	QF	3R	1R	F	QF	3R
(Serbia) **Djokovic**	**W**	**W**	**W**	SF	F	A	QF	**W**	A	**W**	**W**	F	**W**	SF	QF	F	**G**	3R	SF	SF	SF	SF	F	3R	SF	1R
(Switzerland) Federer	A	4R	QF	A	A	A	A	A	A	Retired																
(United States) **Fritz**	3R	2R	3R	A	2R	4R	2R	QF	1R	2R	3R	2R	QF	QF	4R	QF	3R	F	3R	1R	SF	QF	4R	1R	QF	3R
(Russia) / **Khachanov**	3R	2R	QF	S	1R	3R	4R	A	SF	SF	QF	A	1R	4R	2R	2R	A	1R	3R	3R	QF	2R	3R	3R	3R	SF
(Australia) **Kyrios**	3R	A	3R	A	1R	2R	A	F	QF	A	A	A	A	A	A	A	A	A	1R	A	A	A	A	A	A	A
(Russia) / **Medvedev**	F	QF	4R	QF	**W**	F	4R	A	4R	3R	1R	SF	F	F	4R	SF	3R	QF	2R	1R	1R	1R	4R	1R	3R	4R
(United Kingdom) Murray	A	A	3R	A	1R	2R	A	2R	3R	3R	A	2R	2R	1R	1R	A	A	Retired								
(Italy) **Musetti**	Q1	4R	1R	QF	2R	1R	1R	1R	3R	1R	4R	3R	1R	2R	2R	SF	B	3R	3R	SF	1R	QF	QF	A	A	2R
(Spain) Nadal	QF	SF	A	A	A	**W**	**W**	SF	4R	2R	A	A	A	A	1R	A	2R	A	Retired							
(Japan) Nishikori	1R	4R	2R	QF	3R	A	A	A	A	A	A	A	A	A	2R	1R	1R	A	2R	A	A	A	A	A	A	LQ
(Canada) Raonic	4R	A	A	A	A	A	A	A	A	A	A	2R	1R	1R	A	A	A	A	A	A	A	A	Retired			
(Norway) **Ruud**	4R	3R	1R	A	2R	A	F	2R	F	2R	F	2R	2R	3R	SF	2R	QF	4R	2R	2R	A	2R	4R	4R	1R	A
(United States) **Shelton**	A	A	A	A	LQ	A	A	A	1R	QF	1R	2R	SF	3R	3R	4R	A	3R	SF	4R	QF	3R	QF	2R	1R	F
(Italy) **Sinner**	1R	4R	1R	A	4R	QF	4R	QF	QF	4R	2R	SF	4R	**W**	SF	QF	A	**W**	**W**	F	**W**	F	SF	2R	**W**	A
(Austria) Thiem	4R	1R	A	A	A	A	1R	A	1R	1R	1R	1R	2R	1R	LQ	A	A	1R	Retired							
(Greece) **Tsitsipas**	SF	F	1R	3R	3R	SF	4R	3R	1R	F	QF	4R	2R	4R	QF	2R	QF	1R	1R	2R	1R	2R	2R	2R	2R	4R
(France) Tsonga	A	1R	1R	A	A	A	1R	Retired																		
(Switzerland) Wawrinka	2R	A	A	A	A	A	1R	1R	1R	1R	2R	3R	3R	1R	2R	2R	2R	1R	1R	1R	A	A	3R	1R	1R	1R
(Germany) **Zverev**	QF	SF	4R	**G**	SF	4R	SF	A	A	2R	SF	3R	QF	SF	F	4R	QF	QF	F	QF	1R	3R	SF	**W**	F	**W**
	AUS	FRA	WIM	OLY	USA	AUS	FRA	WIM	USA	AUS	FRA	WIM	USA	AUS	FRA	WIM	OLY	USA	AUS	FRA	WIM	USA	AUS	FRA	WIM	USA
Player	2021					2022				2023				2024					2025				2026			

== 2027–2032 ==
Player	2027				2028					2029				2030					2031				2032			
Player	AUS	FRA	WIM	USA	AUS	FRA	WIM	OLY	USA	AUS	FRA	WIM	USA	AUS	FRA	WIM	USA	AUS	FRA	WIM	USA	AUS	FRA	WIM	OLY	USA
(Spain); **Alcaraz**
(Italy); **Berrettini**
(Spain); **Carreño**
(Croatia); **Čilić**
(Italy); **Cobolli**
(Serbia); **Djokovic**
(United States); **Fritz**
(Russia) / **Khachanov**
(Australia); **Kyrgios**
(Russia) / **Medvedev**
(Italy); **Musetti**
(Norway); **Ruud**
(United States); **Shelton**
(Italy); **Sinner**
(Greece); **Tsitsipas**
(Germany); **Zverev**
	AUS	FRA	WIM	USA	AUS	FRA	WIM	OLY	USA	AUS	FRA	WIM	USA	AUS	FRA	WIM	USA	AUS	FRA	WIM	USA	AUS	FRA	WIM	OLY	USA
Player	2027				2028					2029				2030					2031				2032			

== See also ==
- Tennis performance timeline comparison (women) (1978–present)
- Tennis performance timeline comparison (women) (1884–1977)
