= Madrid Open =

There are three sporting events known as the Madrid Open:

- Madrid Open (golf), a men's golf tournament played from 1968 to 2007, except 1994–2000
- WTA Madrid Open (tennis), a women's tennis event played from 1996 to 2003
- Madrid Open (tennis), a current tennis tournament for both men and women
